= Ward Memorial Hall =

- U.S. National Register of Historic Places
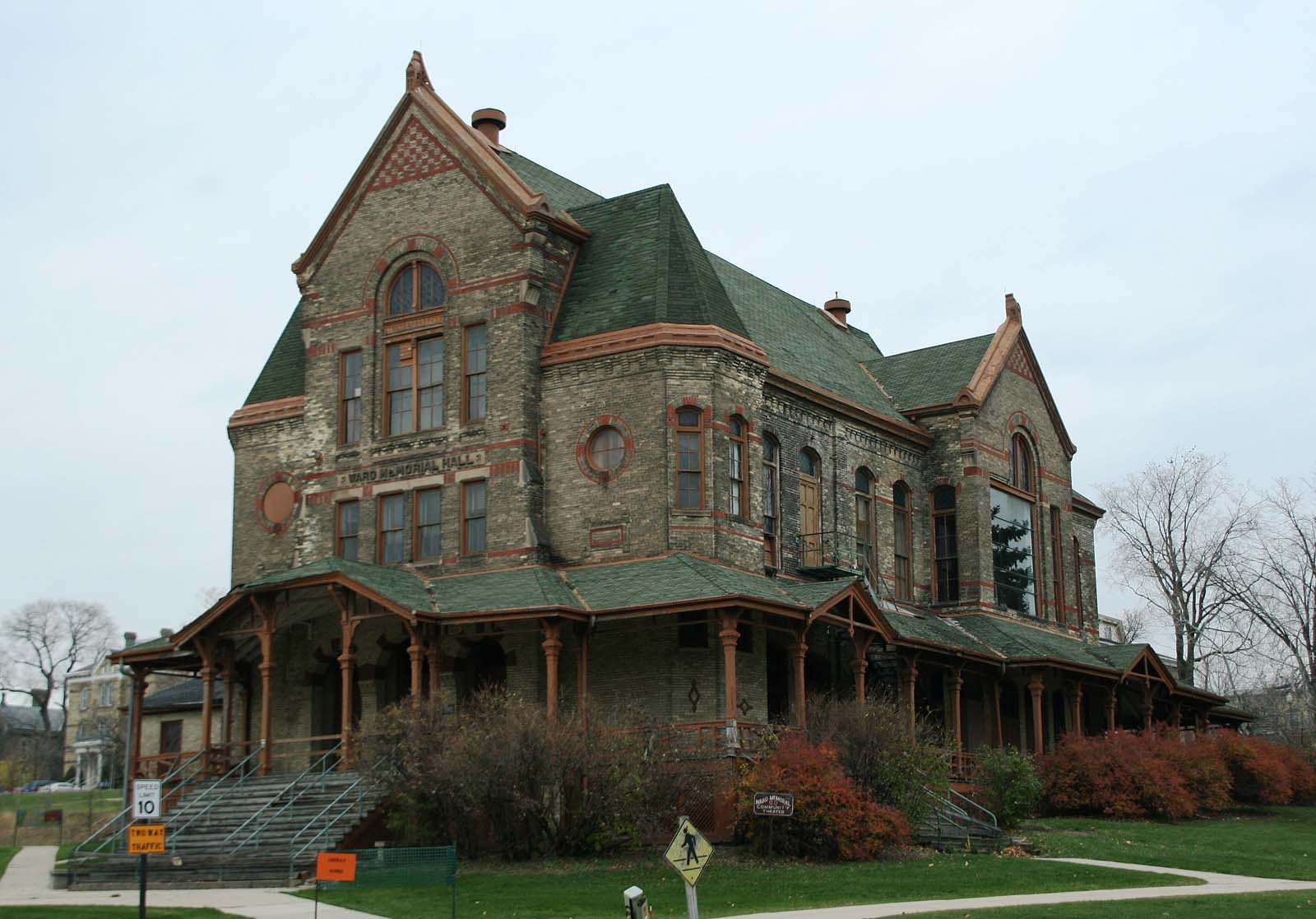
- Ward Memorial Hall
- Location: 5000 West National Avenue, Milwaukee Soldiers Home, Milwaukee, Wisconsin
- Coordinates: 43.0252°N 87.97658°W
- Built: 1882
- Architect: Henry C. Koch
- Architectural style: High Victorian Gothic Revival, Romanesque Revival
- NRHP reference No.: 84003748
- Added to NRHP: September 6, 1984

Ward Memorial Hall is an 1880s theater building within the Northwestern Branch, National Home for Disabled Volunteer Soldiers Historic District, located in Milwaukee, Wisconsin. It is part of the Milwaukee Soldiers Home complex, designated Building No. 41, on the present day Clement J. Zablocki VA Medical Center grounds.

The 900 seat theater was added to the National Register of Historic Places in 1984, as part of an effort to renovate and preserve it.

== History ==
Ward Memorial Hall was built in 1881-82 during a period of expansion for the Northwestern Branch of the National Home for Disabled Volunteer Soldiers facilities, originally the National Asylum for Disabled Volunteer Soldiers (1867−1873). On its completion theatrical entertainment moved from the chapel in the 1869 Main Building.

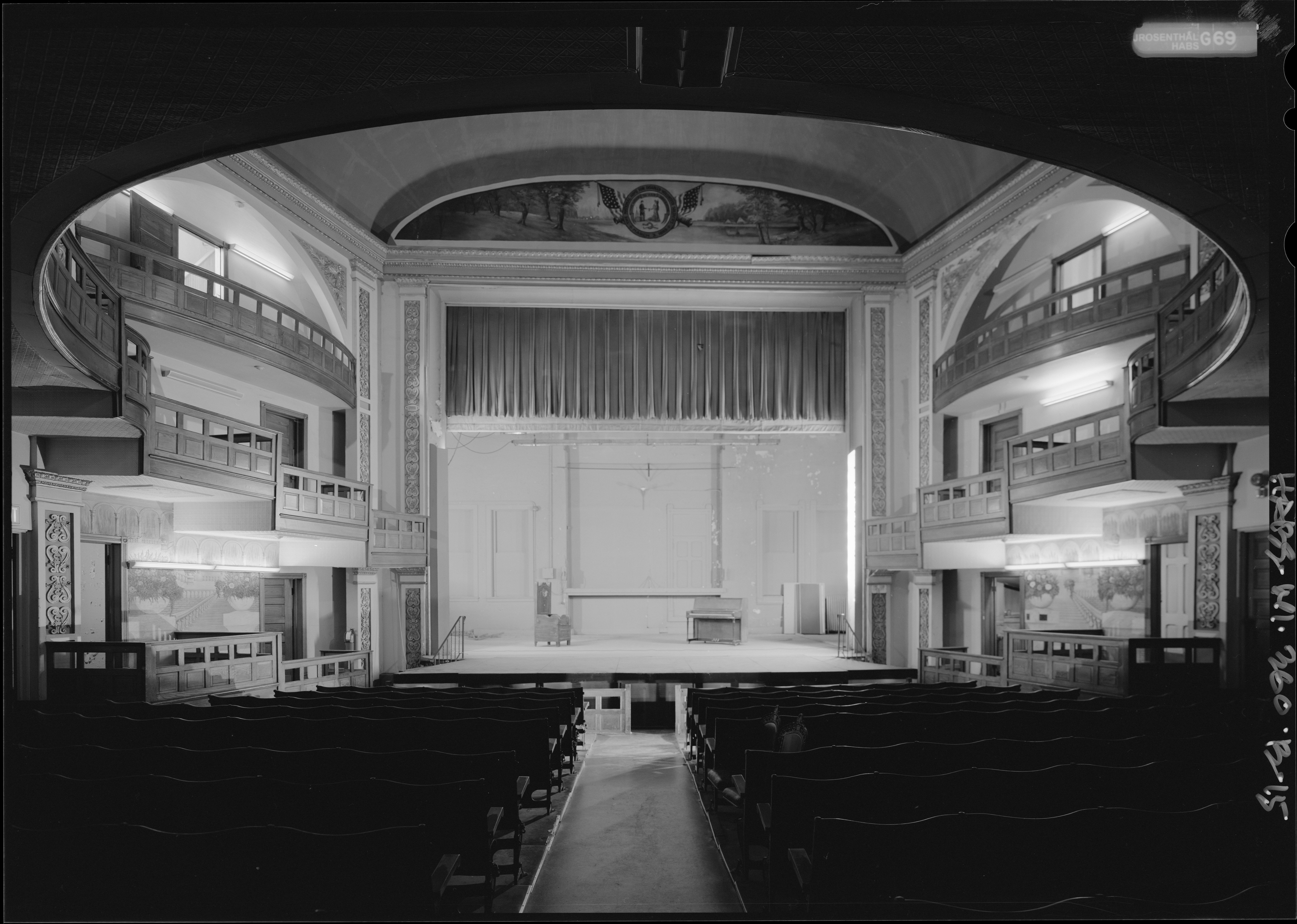
Theater interior.

Prominent Milwaukee architect Henry C. Koch designed Ward Memorial Hall in the High Victorian Gothic Revival and Romanesque Revival styles, with a theater/meeting room, commissary store, restaurant, and railroad passenger station. This unusual combination of building uses was to serve the growing recreational needs of the Milwaukee Soldiers Home. It has a wide veranda wrapping around three sides.

It is one of the oldest theaters in Wisconsin. "Renaissance style" frescoes were designed by J. H. Harding and created under his supervision on the theater's ceiling. They was covered over by a barrel vaulted ceiling when the theater was expanded, but still remain. In 1888 a large stained glass window depicting General U. S. Grant depicted astride his horse was donated by the Grand Army of the Republic, installed on second floor of the east façade, reconfiguring two preexisting windows.

Gradually functions such as the train depot, post office, and store were moved to different structures and the theater facilities were expanded. In 1898 the theater space was entirely reconfigured to have a sloped floor, balcony, and boxes flanking the proscenium stage, and more fire exits.

It was the Milwaukee Soldiers Home's venue for professional entertainments, including lectures, concerts, minstrel and theater companies, and regional vaudeville circuit productions. It has featured performers such as Will Rogers, Sophie Tucker, Ethel Merman, Nat King Cole, Liberace, George Jessel, Bob Hope, and Burns and Allen. After World War II, the theater gradually fell into disuse by resident veterans.

== Conservation ==
From 1981 through 1992 the Milwaukee Players, a local theater company, used the theater for rehearsals and offices. A movement led by the Soldiers Home Foundation, Inc., the American Legion, and other groups began to raise funds to renovate the theater in the early 1980s. Milwaukee native and famous performer Wladziu "Walter" Liberace (1919-1987) offered limited help. When young in the 1920s he had performed at the theater, when visiting veterans with his mother.

Ambitious fundraising efforts by the Soldiers Home Foundation floundered and currently Ward Memorial Hall sits vacant. The building is deteriorating, mainly due to water infiltration and lack of climate control.

The Milwaukee Soldiers Home's vacant buildings, including Ward Memorial Hall, are on the National Trust for Historic Preservation List of 11 Most Endangered Historic Places.

== See also ==
- National Register of Historic Places listings in Milwaukee, Wisconsin
- Soldiers' Home Reef
- National Home for Disabled Volunteer Soldiers
- National Home for Disabled Volunteer Soldiers, Northwestern Branch

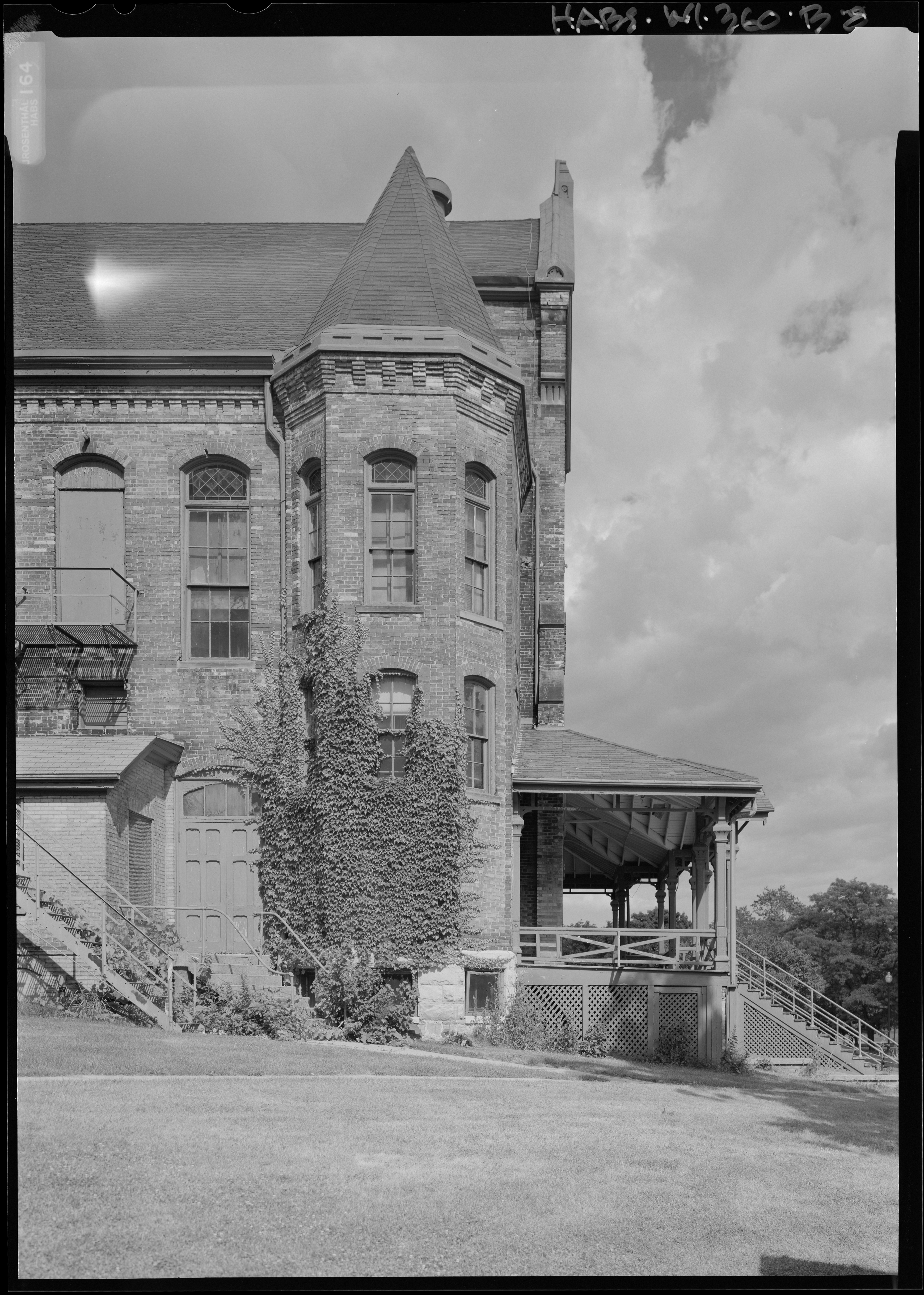
West facade and veranda.
