= Namur (disambiguation) =

Namur is a municipality and city of Belgium, the capital of Wallonia and of the Namur province.

Namur may also refer to:

== Places ==
=== Belgium ===
- Namur (province), a province in Wallonia, Belgium, named after the provincial capital city
- Roman Catholic Diocese of Namur
- County of Namur, a county of the Carolingian and Holy Roman Empire in the Low Countries (981–1795)
- Arrondissement of Namur

=== Other places ===
- Namur, Wisconsin, USA, founded by Walloon immigrants
- Namur Historic District, Wisconsin, USA
- Namur, Quebec, a place in Canada, originally settled by Walloon immigrants
- Namur Island, former island in the Marshall Islands, now joined by landfill with Roi Island

== Organizations ==
- NAMUR, the User Association of Automation Technology in Process Industries
- Université de Namur
- Notre Dame de Namur University in Belmont, California
- UR Namur

== Other ==
- HMS Namur, three ships of the Royal Navy
- Citadel of Namur
- 3374 Namur (1980 KO) is a main-belt asteroid

== See also ==
- Namur station (disambiguation)
