= Schoonmaker Reef =

Fossilized reef in Wauwatosa, Wisconsin

- U.S. National Register of Historic Places
- U.S. National Historic Landmark
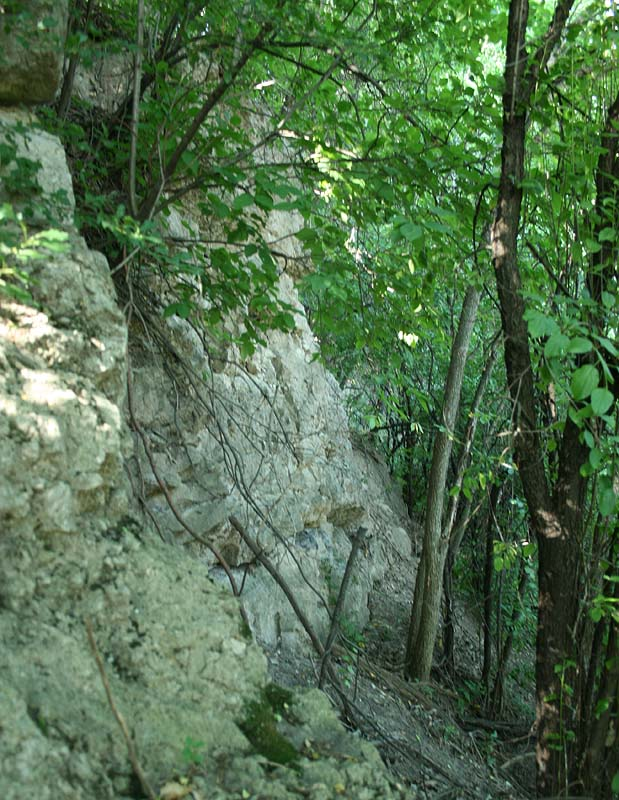

- Location within Wisconsin Location within the United States
- Location: Wauwatosa, Wisconsin
- Coordinates: 43°2′50″N 87°59′37″W
- NRHP reference No.: 97001266

Significant dates
- Added to NRHP: September 25, 1997
- Designated NHL: September 25, 1997

Schoonmaker Reef, also known as Wauwatosa Reef, Schoonmaker Quarry, Raphu Station or Francey Reef is a 425 million year-old fossilized reef in Wauwatosa, Wisconsin. It was discovered in 1844 by Increase A. Lapham and Fisk Day on the site of a quarry owned by the Schoonmaker family. Geologist James Hall declared its significance in 1862. It was the first ancient reef described in North America, and among the first described in the world. It is located North of W. State St., between N. 66th St. and N. 64th St. extended, in Wauwatosa. It was declared a National Historic Landmark in 1997.

== Geology ==
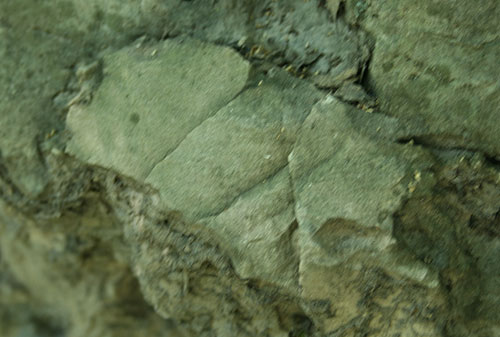
A closeup of fossilized reef material

The Schoonmaker Reef formed approximately 425 million years ago during the Silurian period. It is largely dolomite, a sedimentary rock of calcium magnesium carbonate (CaMg(CO_{3})_{2}) that is similar to limestone. The reef is stratigraphically consistent with the Racine Dolomite, a formation in Wisconsin and Illinois. The exposed portion of the reef is in the Menomonee River valley in Wauwatosa, Wisconsin. It exists as a massive, rock hill that stretches in a 600-foot (180 m) outcrop. It is exposed on the lower 20 feet (6.1 m) of a 60-foot (18 m) bluff; the upper portion of the bluff is formed by glacial sediments left in the last million years. The reef contains a variety of fossils from Silurian period organisms, including trilobites.

== History ==
The first known human interaction with the reef was in 1838, when Joseph Higgins identified it as a source of lime. Lime burning at the reef may have first occurred five years earlier. Silas Brown constructed lime kilns in the 1840s which remained in use until 1857. Increase A. Lapham first identified the reef as an area of geological interest in 1844.

John Schoonmaker and Isaac W. Van Schaick purchased the land in 1857. Schoonmaker operated the quarry until 1909 and is its namesake. In 1862, James Hall identified Schoonmaker Reef as the first ancient reef on mainland North America. Hall was made aware of the reef by Lapham, who sent him fossils that he had collected there. He frequently visited Lapham in the Milwaukee, Wisconsin area in the 1850s to examine Lapham's fossil collection. Hall made Schonmaker a focus of his studies of ancient reefs and it became the scientific model for reef development in the nineteenth century.

Thomas Chrowder Chamberlin, the Wisconsin State Geologist, published a study of the reef in 1877 comparing it to modern reefs. He identified Schoonmaker as an important model of reef study because of its abundance of fossils. Amateur geologists like Thomas A. Greene and Fisk Holbrook Day collected fossils from the site. Day's collection, which featured samples from about two hundred species, was responsible for approximately 90% of reef species identification. Alexander Emanuel Agassiz purchased most of Day's collection (over 4 short tons (3.6 t)) for the Museum of Comparative Zoology at Harvard University in 1881. Day sold over five thousand fossils to Greene for this museum and another 10,000 of his collection were sold to the University of Michigan after his death. William C. Alden photographed the reef in 1899; the picture was widely distributed in geology textbooks. In 1904, Amadeus William Grabau published a paper on the reef in the Geological Society of America Bulletin in 1903.

The G. D. Francey Coal, Stone & Supply Company bought the land from Schoonmaker in 1909 to produce aggregate. Robert Rakes Shrock published a paper on Wisconsin reefs, featuring the Schoonmaker Reef, in the Geological Society of America Bulletin in 1939. He was the first to completely diagram a cross-section of the reef. In 1948, the Bliffert Concrete Company bought the quarry and concrete plant and leased it to the Fuller Company. It was abandoned two years later.

In recent years, an apartment complex named The Reef was constructed in front of the reef site.

== See also ==
- Soldiers' Home Reef
- List of National Historic Landmarks in Wisconsin
- National Register of Historic Places listings in Milwaukee County, Wisconsin
