= National Historic Landmark District =

Geographical area

A National Historic Landmark District (NHLD) is a geographical area that has received recognition from the United States Government that the buildings, landscapes, cultural features and archaeological resources within it are of the highest significance and worthy of preservation. NHLDs are National Historic Landmarks that are also historic districts in the United States.

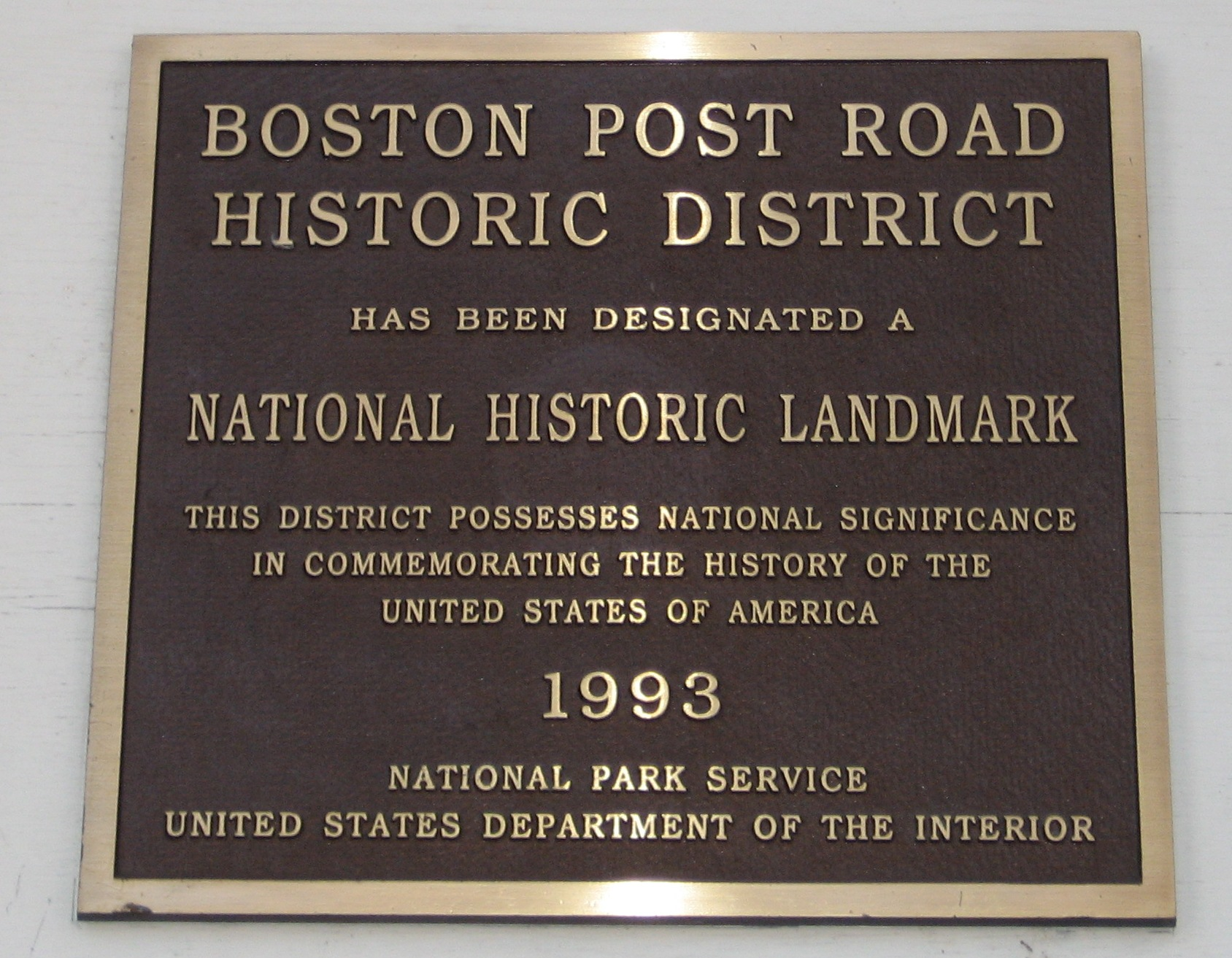
Boston Post Road Historic District plaque

== Characteristics ==
The boundaries of an NHLD typically include contributing properties that may themselves be listed distinctly as a National Historic Landmark or on the National Register of Historic Places but may also include non-contributing properties. The U.S. federal government designates historic districts through the National Park Service, a division of the U.S. Department of the Interior.

Once designated an NHL District, districts often become cultural destinations and generate economic benefits for the communities from history-related tourism. NHLDs often qualify for preservation grant monies but dramatic or negative change to them can impact their integrity and create cause for concern over the loss of NHLD designation. These threats can come from development or climate change as evidenced most recently with the catastrophic damage to the Lahaina NHLD from wildfires.

One of the largest NHLDs is the island of Nantucket, Massachusetts, at over 30,000 acres; some are much smaller, including the Cobblestone Historic District in New York state, which is under one acre in size.

== Distribution by state ==
There are just over 100 National Historic Landmark Districts in the U.S., including:

=== Alabama ===
- Tuskegee Airmen National Historic Site

=== Alaska ===
- Seal Island Historic District
- Skagway Historic District and White Pass

=== Arizona ===
- Tombstone Historic District in Tombstone, Arizona
- Jerome Historic District

=== Arkansas ===
- Bathhouse Row
- Fort Smith National Historic Site

=== California ===
- Monterey Old Town Historic District
- Coloma in El Dorado County, California
- Columbia Historic District in Columbia, California
- Locke Historic District in the Sacramento–San Joaquin River Delta
- Mission Santa Inés
- Old Sacramento State Historic Park in Sacramento, California
- Presidio of San Francisco in San Francisco, California
- San Juan Bautista State Historic Park in San Juan Bautista, California

=== Colorado ===
- Denver Civic Center in Denver
- Georgetown-Silver Plume Historic District
- Telluride Historic District
- Silverton, Colorado
- Trujillo Homesteads
- Leadville Historic District
- Cripple Creek Historic District
- Central City/Black Hawk Historic District

=== Connecticut ===
- Cheney Brothers Historic District in Manchester, Connecticut
- Litchfield Historic District

=== Delaware ===
- New Castle Historic District
- Eleutherian Mills

=== Florida ===
- Ybor City Historic District in Tampa
- St. Augustine Town Plan Historic District
- Pensacola Naval Air Station Historic District in Pensacola, Florida

=== Georgia ===
- Juliette Gordon Low Historic District, itself part of another NHLD, the Savannah Historic District
- Savannah Historic District in Savannah, Georgia
- Sweet Auburn

=== Hawaii ===
- Lahaina Historic District in Maui Large parts of this district were damaged in the 2023 Hawai'i wildfires.

=== Illinois ===
- Riverside Historic District (Riverside, Illinois)

=== Indiana ===
- Madison Historic District in Madison, Indiana

=== Iowa ===
- Amana Colonies
- Mines of Spain State Recreation Area and E. B. Lyons Nature Center

=== Kansas ===
- Council Grove Historic District
- El Cuartelejo
- Fort Leavenworth
- Haskell Institute
- Nicodemus Historic District
- Spring Hill Ranch
- Tobias-Thompson Complex
- Warkentin Farm
- Western Branch, National Home for Disabled Volunteer Soldiers

=== Kentucky ===
- Camp Nelson National Monument
- Pleasant Hill, Kentucky

=== Louisiana ===
- Garden District, New Orleans
- Natchitoches Historic District in Natchitoches, Louisiana

=== Maine ===
- Sabbathday Lake Shaker Village

=== Maryland ===
- Colonial Annapolis Historic District in Annapolis, Maryland
- Chestertown Historic District (Chestertown, Maryland) in Chestertown, Maryland
- St. Mary's City, Maryland

=== Massachusetts ===
- Boston Common
- Boston Navy Yard
- Boston Public Garden
- Nantucket Historic District
- New Bedford Historic District

=== Michigan ===
- Mackinac Island
- Marshall Historic District
- Calumet Historic District
- Quincy Mine

=== Minnesota ===
- Mille Lacs Kathio State Park

=== Mississippi ===
- Lyceum–The Circle Historic District

=== Missouri ===
- Harry S. Truman Historic District
- Ste. Genevieve National Historical Park

=== Montana ===
- Butte–Anaconda Historic District
- Virginia City Historic District

=== Nebraska ===
- Boys Town, Nebraska

=== Nevada ===
- Virginia City Historic District in Virginia City, Nevada

=== New Hampshire ===
- Harrisville Historic District (Harrisville, New Hampshire)

=== New Jersey ===
- Cape May Historic District
- Abbott Farm Historic District
- Fort Hancock and the Sandy Hook Proving Ground Historic District
- Great Falls of the Passaic in Paterson, New Jersey
- Ringwood Manor

=== New Mexico ===
- Acoma Pueblo
- Fort Bayard Historic District
- Barrio de Analco Historic District
- Zuni-Cibola Complex

=== New York ===
- Boston Post Road Historic District in Rye, New York Includes 5 properties: The Jay Estate, The Jay Cemetery, Rye Golf Club, Lounsbury, and Marshlands Conservancy
- Brooklyn Heights Historic District
- Central Park
- Chautauqua Historic District in Chautauqua, New York
- Cobblestone Historic District in Gaines, New York
- Colonial Niagara Historic District in Niagara, New York
- Geneseo National Historic Landmark District in Geneseo, New York
- Governors Island
- Hudson River Historic District
- Huguenot Street Historic District in New Paltz, New York
- Hurley Historic District in Hurley, New York
- Mohawk Upper Castle Historic District
- Sailors' Snug Harbor
- SoHo–Cast Iron Historic District

=== North Carolina ===
- Bethabara Historic District
- Bethania Historic District
- Old Salem

=== Ohio ===
- Mariemont Historic District

=== Oklahoma ===
- Guthrie Historic District (Guthrie, Oklahoma)

=== Oregon ===
- Jacksonville Historic District (Jacksonville, Oregon)

=== Pennsylvania ===
- Bethlehem, Pennsylvania
- Colonial Germantown Historic District
- Bryn Athyn Historic District
- Old Economy Village
- Harmony Historic District
- Kennywood

=== Rhode Island ===
- Newport Historic District in Newport, Rhode Island
- Bellevue Avenue Historic District
- Ocean Drive Historic District
- College Hill Historic District (Providence, Rhode Island)

=== South Carolina ===
- Charleston, South Carolina
- Beaufort Historic District in Beaufort, South Carolina
- Penn Center (Saint Helena Island, South Carolina)

=== South Dakota ===
- Deadwood, South Dakota

=== Tennessee ===
- Siege and Battle of Corinth Sites

=== Texas ===
- Dealey Plaza
- East End Historic District (Galveston, Texas)
- Strand Historic District

=== Utah ===
- Brigham Young Complex

=== Vermont ===
- Coolidge Homestead
- Plymouth Historic District (Plymouth, Vermont)

=== Virginia ===
- Alexandria Historic District
- Colonial Williamsburg
- Green Springs National Historic Landmark District
- Waterford Historic District in Waterford, Virginia

=== Washington ===
- Mount Rainier National Park
- Port Townsend Historic District

=== West Virginia ===
- Matewan Historic District
- Davis and Elkins Historic District

=== Wisconsin ===
- Greendale Historic District
- Milwaukee Soldiers Home (Old Main)
- Northwestern Branch, National Home for Disabled Volunteer Soldiers Historic District

=== Wyoming ===
- Fort Yellowstone
- J. C. Penney Historic District
- Murie Ranch Historic District

=== District of Columbia ===
- Georgetown (Washington, D.C.)
