= List of National Historic Landmarks in Wisconsin =

Wisconsin National Historic Landmarks (clickable map)

This is a list of National Historic Landmarks in the U.S. state of Wisconsin. National Historic Landmarks are designated by the U.S. National Park Service, which recognizes buildings, structures, districts, objects, and sites which satisfy certain criteria for historic significance. There are 45 National Historic Landmarks in Wisconsin.

== Key ==
	National Historic Landmark
^{†}	National Historic Landmark District
^{#}	National Historic Site, National Historical Park, National Memorial, or National Monument
^{*}	Delisted Landmark

== Current landmarks ==
	Landmark name	Image	Date designated	Location	County	Description
1	Administration Building and Research Tower, S.C. Johnson Company	Administration Building and Research Tower, S.C. Johnson Company	January 7, 1976 (#74002275)	Racine; 42°42′44″N 87°47′29″W	Racine	Frank Lloyd Wright-designed building.
2	Astor Fur Warehouse	Astor Fur Warehouse	October 9, 1960 (#66000800)	Prairie du Chien; 43°03′11″N 91°09′36″W	Crawford	Oldest known surviving fur trade warehouse in the upper Mississippi River valley.
3	Aztalan	Aztalan	July 19, 1964 (#66000022)	Lake Mills; 43°03′56″N 88°51′46″W	Jefferson	Prehistoric site, now a state park.
4	Harold C. Bradley House	Harold C. Bradley House	January 7, 1976 (#72000047)	Madison; 43°04′11″N 89°25′16″W	Dane	Prairie School home designed by Louis Sullivan.
5	Brisbois House	Brisbois House	October 9, 1960 (#66000801)	Prairie du Chien; 43°03′08″N 91°09′35″W	Crawford	Built with stone left over from Fort Crawford.
6	USS Cobia	USS Cobia	January 14, 1986 (#86000087)	Manitowoc; 44°05′24″N 87°39′29″W	Manitowoc	Representative of the Gato class of U.S. World War II submarines.
7	Dr. Fisk Holbrook Day House	Dr. Fisk Holbrook Day House	September 25, 1997 (#97001268)	Wauwatosa; 43°03′09″N 88°00′46″W	Milwaukee	Associated with noted geologist Fisk Holbrook Day.
8	Dousman Hotel	Dousman Hotel	October 9, 1960 (#66000122)	Prairie du Chien; 43°03′07″N 91°09′35″W	Crawford	Hotel with ties to fur traders in area.
9	Farmers' and Merchants' Union Bank	Farmers' and Merchants' Union Bank	January 7, 1976 (#72000044)	Columbus; 43°20′20″N 89°00′55″W	Columbia	One of eight "jewel box" banks designed by Louis Sullivan
10	First Unitarian Society Meetinghouse	First Unitarian Society Meetinghouse	August 18, 2004 (#73000076)	Shorewood Hills; 43°04′33″N 89°26′07″W	Dane	Frank Lloyd Wright-designed church.
11	Fountain Lake Farm	Fountain Lake Farm	June 21, 1990 (#90000471)	Montello; 43°41′30″N 89°23′14″W	Marquette	Home of John Muir from 1849-1856.
12	Fourth Street (Meir) School	Fourth Street (Meir) School	December 14, 1990 (#84003720)	Milwaukee; 43°03′04″N 87°54′53″W	Milwaukee	Golda Meir attended school from 1906-1912.
13	Hamlin Garland House	Hamlin Garland House	November 11, 1971 (#71000040)	West Salem; 43°53′57″N 91°05′07″W	La Crosse	Author Hamlin Garland visited and wrote here regularly.
14^{†}	Greendale Historic District	Greendale Historic District	October 16, 2012 (#05000763)	Greendale; 42°56′29″N 87°59′45″W	Milwaukee	One of three "greenbelt" towns built by the federal government.
15	Thomas A. Greene Memorial Museum	Thomas A. Greene Memorial Museum	November 4, 1993 (#93001615)	Milwaukee; 43°04′44″N 87°52′40″W	Milwaukee	Former museum of geology on University of Wisconsin–Milwaukee campus.
16	Herbert and Katherine Jacobs First House	Herbert and Katherine Jacobs First House	July 31, 2003 (#03001037)	Madison; 43°03′31″N 89°26′29″W	Dane	First of more than 300 Usonian houses designed by Frank Lloyd Wright.
17	Herbert and Katherine Jacobs Second House	Herbert and Katherine Jacobs Second House	July 31, 2003 (#03001038)	Madison; 43°04′26″N 89°32′05″W	Dane	Frank Lloyd Wright-designed home.
18	Herbert Johnson House	Herbert Johnson House	June 29, 1989 (#75000076)	Wind Point; 42°46′49″N 87°46′15″W	Racine	Frank Lloyd Wright-designed home for the Johnson of Johnson Wax.
19	Robert M. La Follette Home	Robert M. La Follette Home	January 29, 1964 (#66000020)	Maple Bluff; 43°06′54″N 89°22′20″W	Dane	A home of Robert M. La Follette
20^{†}	Aldo Leopold Shack and Farm	Aldo Leopold Shack and Farm	January 16, 2009 (#78000082)	Fairfield; 43°33′46″N 89°39′33″W	Sauk	Farm associated with the writing of Sand County Almanac
21	Little White Schoolhouse	Little White Schoolhouse	May 30, 1974 (#73000079)	Ripon; 43°50′31″N 88°50′11″W	Fond du Lac	Birthplace of the U.S. Republican Party.
22	Man Mound	Man Mound	October 31, 2016 (#16000861)	Greenfield; 43°29′19″N 89°40′15″W	Sauk	The only surviving earthen anthropomorphic mound in North America.
23	Milton House	Milton House	August 6, 1998 (#72000065)	Milton; 42°46′36″N 88°56′11″W	Rock	Underground railway station in unusual hotel.
24	Milwaukee City Hall	Milwaukee City Hall	April 5, 2005 (#73000085)	Milwaukee; 43°02′30″N 87°54′35″W	Milwaukee	Germanic architecture; United States' tallest habitable building 1885-1899.
25^{†}	Namur Historic District	Namur Historic District	December 14, 1990 (#87002553)	Namur; 44°44′03″N 87°39′59″W	Door	District of Belgian-American settlers, where French with a Walloon accent is still spoken.
26	North Hall, University of Wisconsin	North Hall, University of Wisconsin	December 21, 1965 (#66000021)	Madison; 43°04′26″N 89°24′11″W	Dane	First structure on the University of Wisconsin–Madison campus.
27^{†}	Northwestern Branch, National Home for Disabled Volunteer Soldiers	Northwestern Branch, National Home for Disabled Volunteer Soldiers	June 17, 2011 (#05000530)	5000 West National Avenue, Milwaukee; 43°01′14″N 87°58′42″W	Milwaukee	90 acres (36 ha) Milwaukee Soldiers Home (est. 1867) campus, on the Clement J. Zablocki VA Medical Center grounds.
28	Oconto Site	Oconto Site	January 20, 1961 (#66000023)	Oconto; 44°53′12″N 87°54′03″W	Oconto	Burial ground and artifacts dating back 5,000-6,000 years.
29	Pabst Theater	Pabst Theater	December 4, 1991 (#72000063)	Milwaukee; 43°02′27″N 87°54′38″W	Milwaukee	Fourth-oldest continually operating theater in nation.
30	Ringling Brothers Circus Winter Headquarters	Ringling Brothers Circus Winter Headquarters	August 4, 1969 (#69000032)	Baraboo; 43°28′01″N 89°44′07″W	Sauk	Winter headquarters of the Ringling Brothers Circus from 1884 until 1918.
31^{†}	Rock Island II Site	Rock Island II Site	December 11, 2023 (#100009834)	Rock Island; 45°24′27″N 86°49′21″W	Door	Site of camps of Native Americans, ranging from Middle Woodland around 0 CE to Oneota, to Potawatomi in the 1670s, to Ottawa in the 1760s.
32	Schoonmaker Reef	Schoonmaker Reef	September 25, 1997 (#97001266)	Wauwatosa; 43°02′43″N 87°59′37″W	Milwaukee	Fossilized reef, among the earliest discovered in the world.
33	Second Fort Crawford Military Hospital	Second Fort Crawford Military Hospital	October 9, 1960 (#66000121)	Prairie du Chien; 43°02′30″N 91°08′49″W	Crawford	Dates back to first half of 19th century, now houses medical museum.
34^{†}	Silver Mound Archeological District	Silver Mound Archeological District	February 17, 2006 (#75000067)	Hixton; 44°25′36″N 90°57′35″W	Jackson	Site of early Native American settlement.
35	Soldiers' Home Reef	Soldiers' Home Reef	November 4, 1993 (#93001617)	Milwaukee; 43°01′40″N 87°58′29″W	Milwaukee	Fossilized reef, among the earliest discovered in the world.
36	Taliesin	Taliesin	January 7, 1976 (#73000081)	Spring Green; 43°08′30″N 90°04′15″W	Iowa	Frank Lloyd Wright-designed home and studio.
37	Ten Chimneys	Ten Chimneys	July 31, 2003 (#03001042)	Genesee; 42°57′51″N 88°22′38″W	Waukesha	Residence of Alfred Lunt and Lynn Fontanne.
38	Turner Hall	Turner Hall	November 15, 1996 (#77000041)	Milwaukee; 43°02′37″N 87°54′56″W	Milwaukee	Associated with German-American Turners.
39	University of Wisconsin Arboretum	University of Wisconsin Arboretum	January 13, 2021 (#100006237)	1207 Seminole Hwy. 43°02′29″N 89°25′51″W	Dane	Site of historic research in ecological restoration.
40	University of Wisconsin Armory & Gymnasium	University of Wisconsin Armory & Gymnasium	November 4, 1993 (#93001618)	Madison; 43°04′33″N 89°23′52″W	Dane	Associated with Wisconsin Progressive Republican movement.
41	University of Wisconsin Dairy Barn	University of Wisconsin Dairy Barn	April 5, 2005 (#02000600)	Madison; 43°04′28″N 89°25′06″W	Dane	Site of veterinary nutrition research.
42	University of Wisconsin Science Hall	University of Wisconsin Science Hall	November 4, 1993 (#93001616)	Madison; 43°04′32″N 89°24′02″W	Dane	Associated with noted geology instructor Charles R. Van Hise.
43	Van Hise Rock	Van Hise Rock	September 25, 1997 (#97001267)	Rock Springs; 43°29′15″N 89°54′55″W	Sauk	Rock outcropping that Charles R. Van Hise used to create principles of structural geology.
44	Villa Louis	Villa Louis	October 9, 1960 (#66000123)	Prairie du Chien; 43°03′21″N 91°09′33″W	Crawford	Fur trader mansion built in 1871.
45	Wisconsin State Capitol	Wisconsin State Capitol	January 3, 2001 (#70000031)	Madison; 43°04′28″N 89°23′05″W	Dane	Example of Renaissance Revival and Beaux-Arts architecture.

== See also ==
- National Register of Historic Places listings in Wisconsin
- List of U.S. National Historic Landmarks by state
- List of National Natural Landmarks in Wisconsin
