= Silver Mound Archeological District =

Historic district in Wisconsin, United States

- U.S. National Register of Historic Places
- U.S. National Historic Landmark District
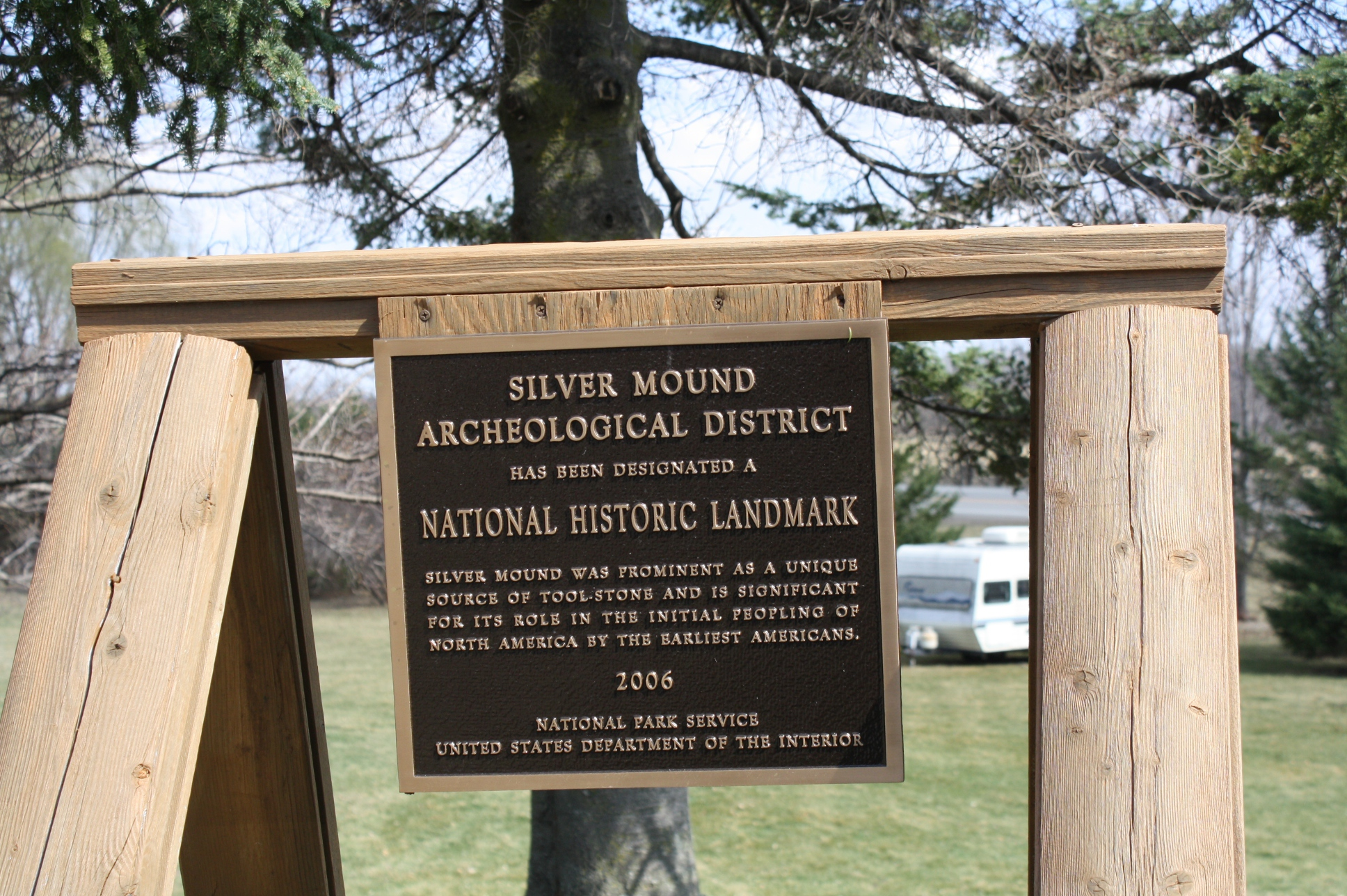
- Sign

- Location within Wisconsin Location within the United States
- Nearest city: Alma Center, Wisconsin
- Coordinates: 44°25′36″N 90°57′35″W
- NRHP reference No.: 75000067

Significant dates
- Added to NRHP: January 17, 1975
- Designated NHLD: February 17, 2006

Silver Mound is a sandstone hill in Wisconsin where American Indians quarried quartzite for stone tools. Tools made from Silver Mound's quartzite have been found as far away as Kentucky. The oldest have been dated to around 11,000 years ago, so they provide clues about the first people in Wisconsin. Silver Mound Archeological District was declared a National Historic Landmark in 2006.

== Geography and geology ==
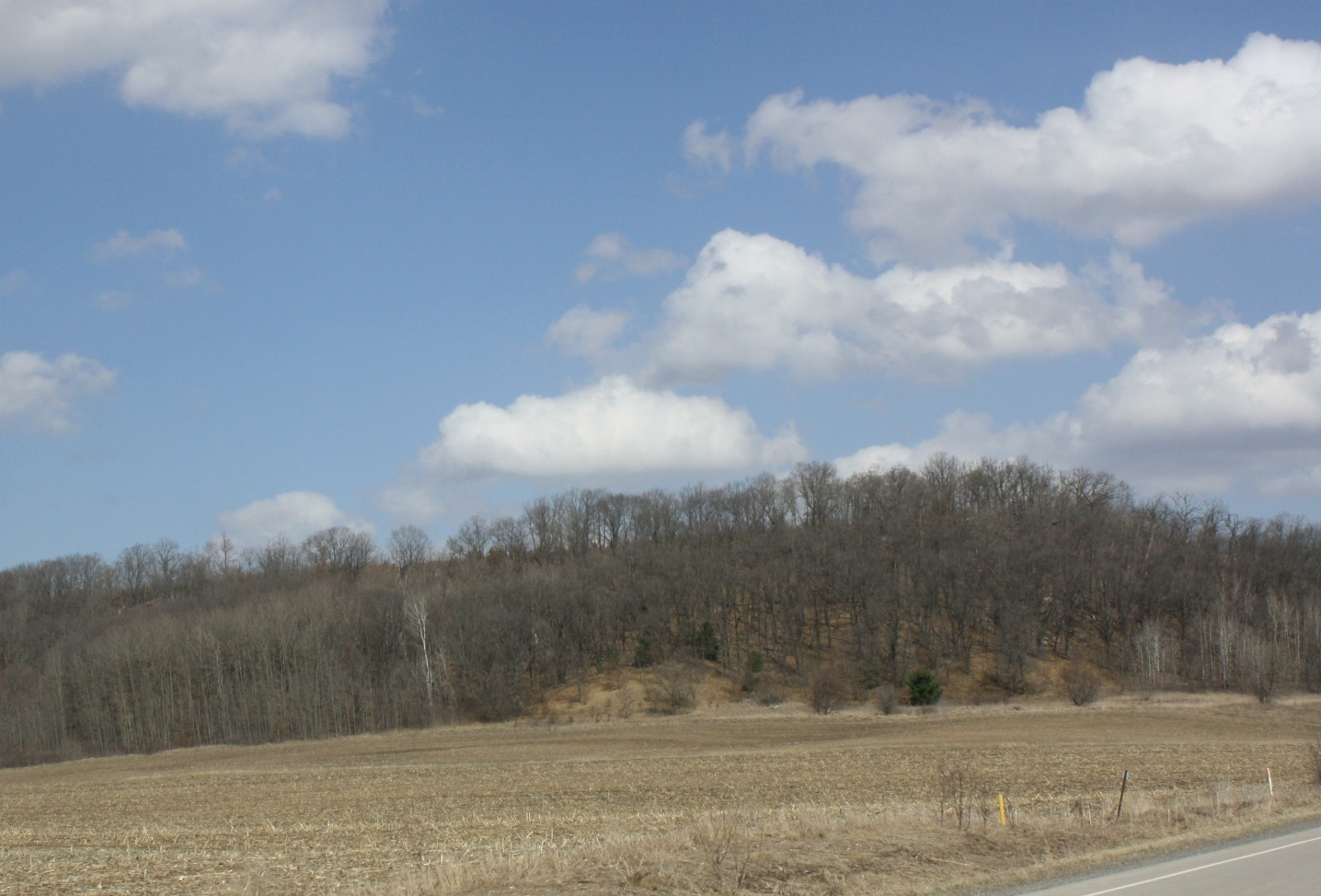
Silver Mound

Silver Mound is in the town of Hixton, Jackson County, Wisconsin. Its sandstone was laid down long ago in the Cambrian Period, like many other bluffs in the area. But in this sandstone a layer of very hard stone called silicated quartzite or orthoquartzite formed. Stone like this is fairly uncommon. With simple tools it can be broken into pieces and shaped into points through a process called knapping. And this quartzite from Silver Mound can be distinguished by technical analyses from similar orthoquartzite from other locations.

== Human use ==
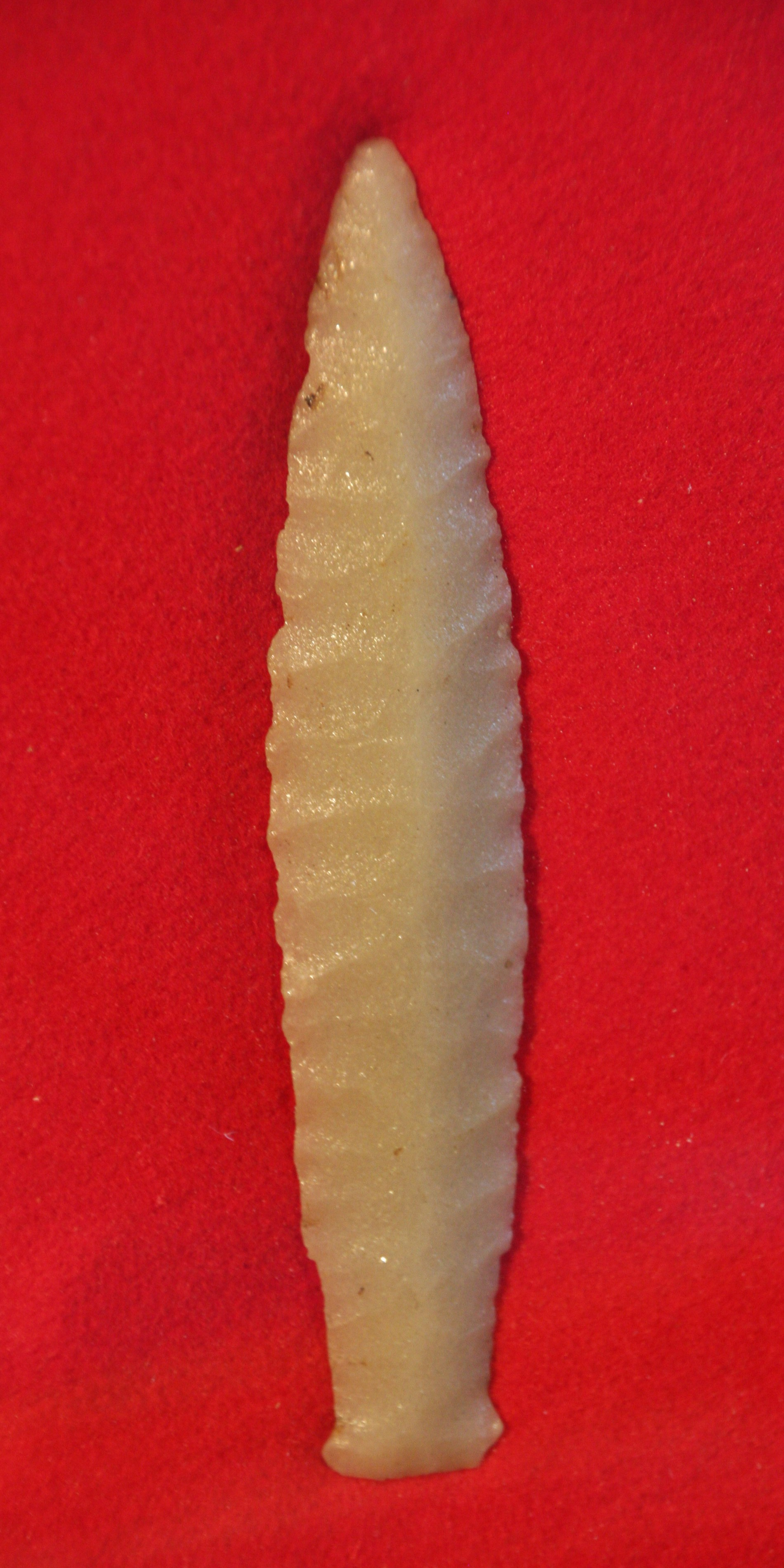
A fluted point made from Hixton quartzite

The earliest known humans at Silver Mound were Paleo-Indians, who entered the area about 9550 BC. This is not long after the last glacier began retreating a short distance to the north, when the climate remained cool and mammoths and mastodons still roamed the area. To hunt them, the Paleo-Indians needed good projectile points. They also needed knives and scrapers for processing their kill. These tools could be made from the quartzite from Silver Mound, which was the largest source of orthoquartzite in the Midwest. Tools made from Hixton orthoquartzite and datable to this period have been found as far away as Mammoth Cave in Kentucky.

Later Indians continued to quarry the quartzite at Silver Mound. By 8,000 BC the mammoths and mastodons were extinct, but Archaic Indians needed points to hunt large, now-extinct bison, elk and deer, and some quarried orthoquartzite at Silver Mound. Later Woodland and Oneota peoples also used stone from Silver Mound.

In total there are about one thousand quarry pits on the mound. From the fragments left, some areas have been identified as workshops where the larger pieces of quartzite were broken up into smaller pieces suitable for working. In other workshops the smaller pieces were finished. Six rock shelters have also been found on the bluff. Two contain rock art.

Euro-Americans have been aware of the Indian quarries on the mound since the 1840s. It was named Silver Mound because they mistakenly believed it contained silver. Some mining was done, but no silver was found. The land around the base of the mound has been farmed for years, but much of the mound itself remains largely undisturbed. Professional archeologists first visited the mound in 1928. Gradually the remarkable age of some of the Indian quarries emerged. In 1975 Silver Mound was placed on the National Register of Historic Places. In 2006 it was named a National Historic Landmark, largely because of the potential information it may still hold about the earliest people in Wisconsin.

== See also ==
- List of National Historic Landmarks in Wisconsin
- National Register of Historic Places listings in Jackson County, Wisconsin
