= Thomas A. Greene Memorial Museum =

- U.S. National Register of Historic Places
- U.S. National Historic Landmark
- U.S. Historic district – Contributing property
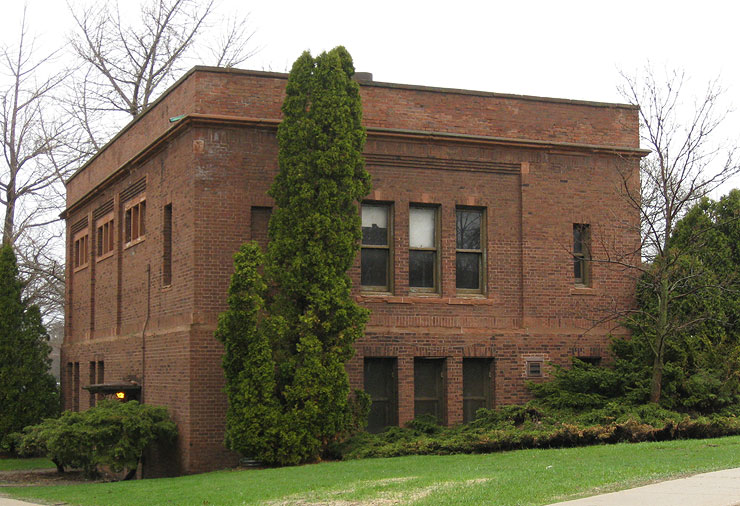

- Location within Wisconsin Location within the United States
- Location: 3367 N. Downer Ave., Milwaukee, Wisconsin
- Coordinates: 43°4′44.02″N 87°52′41.02″W
- Built: 1913
- Architect: Alexander C. Eschweiler, Sr.
- Architectural style: Moderne, Art Deco
- Part of: Milwaukee-Downer "Quad" (ID74000106)
- NRHP reference No.: 93001615

Significant dates
- Added to NRHP: November 4, 1993
- Designated NHL: November 4, 1993
- Designated CP: January 17, 1974

The Thomas A. Greene Memorial Museum, also known as Greene Geological Museum or Greene Museum, is a mineral and fossil museum in Milwaukee, Wisconsin, administered by the Department of Geosciences at the University of Wisconsin–Milwaukee.

== Original building ==
The original fireproof museum building, designed by noted Milwaukee architect, Alexander Eschweiler, held the collection of Thomas A. Greene, Milwaukee druggist and amateur geologist, plant collector, and fossil collector. In 1913, Greene's heirs, Mrs. H.A.J. Upham and Mr. Howard Greene, had the facility built to house his collection, and it was declared a National Historic Landmark in 1993, in recognition of the collection's significance as a largely intact amateur geological collection. The collection has been removed from the building, and is now displayed and housed in Lapham Hall on the UWM campus.

The building has been renovated and is currently used as academic space for UWM's Sam and Helen Stahl Center for Jewish Studies.

== Collection ==
Greene amassed most of the fossils in his collection, totaling about 75,000 specimens, during the 1880s and 1890s. The majority of these specimens come from the Silurian Racine Dolomite Formation and the Devonian Milwaukee Formation in the vicinity of southeastern Wisconsin. Preserved mostly as internal molds in dolomite, these fossils include a wide range of Silurian marine invertebrate groups including trilobites, crinoids, tabulate and rugose corals, brachiopods, cephalopods, and gastropods. Devonian fossils consist mainly of fish and plant remains. All of these fossils were collected from quarry outcrops that no longer exist, making the collection irreplaceable.

The mineral collection contains a wide range of minerals and ores from localities throughout North America, as well as some from overseas. It includes exquisite examples of amethyst, apatite, stibnite, copper, tungsten, molybdenum, vanadium, cobalt, nickel, mercury compounds, aluminum compounds, malachite, lapis-lazuli, tourmaline, garnet, labradorite, fluorite, beryl, and turquoise, among others. Perhaps the highlight of the mineral collection is a piece of iron meteorite that landed in nearby Washington County, Wisconsin. It was given to Greene by the scientist Increase A. Lapham, the namesake of Lapham Hall.

Greene collaborated with another amateur, Dr. Fisk Holbrook Day, whose home in Wauwatosa, Wisconsin, the Dr. Fisk Holbrook Day House, has also been designated a National Historic Landmark.

== See also ==
- List of National Historic Landmarks in Wisconsin
- National Register of Historic Places listings in Milwaukee
