= Milwaukee Soldiers Home (Old Main) =

1 of 3 soldiers homes which have survived in the United States

- Old Main (English)
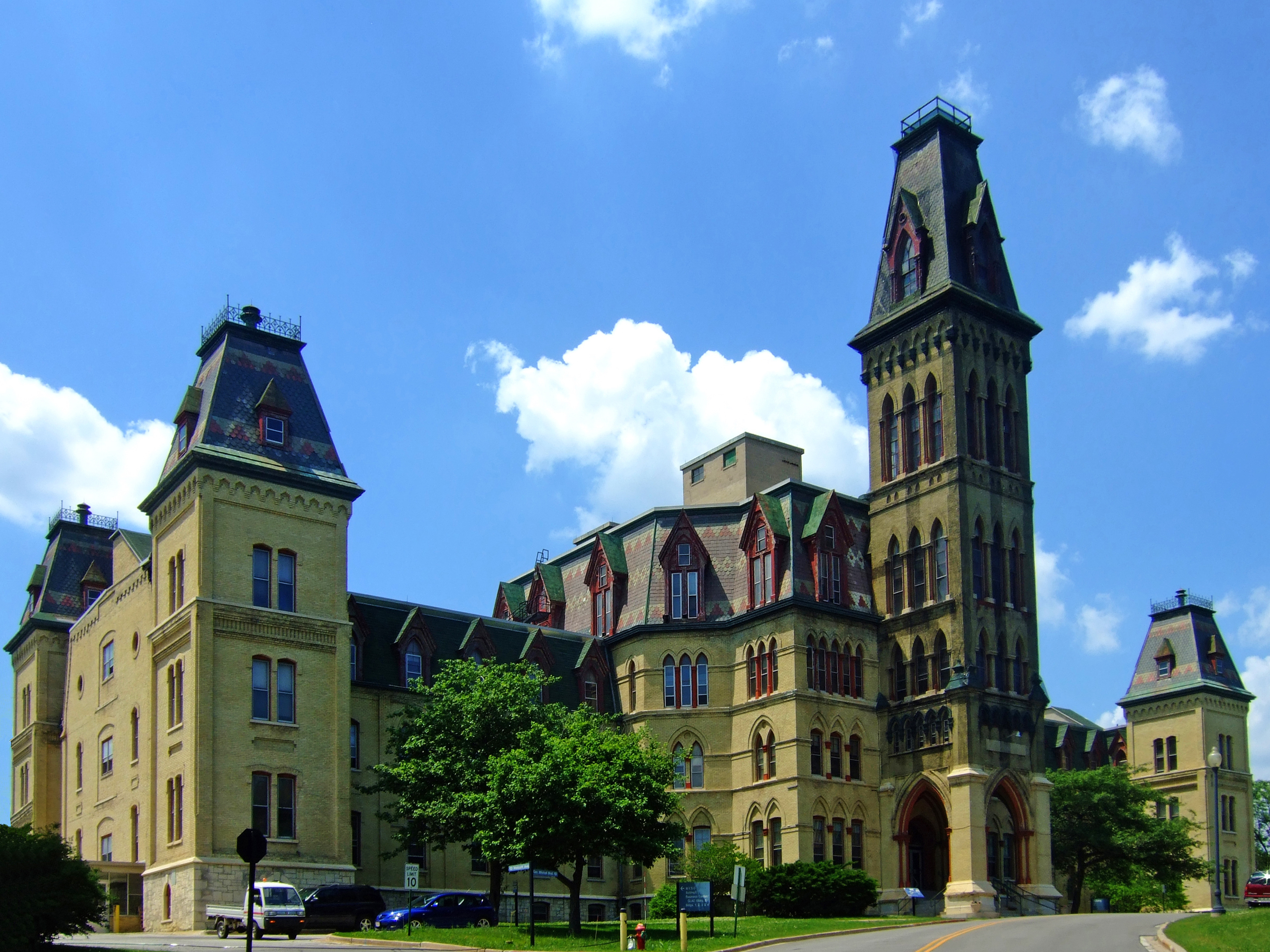
- The Milwaukee Soldiers Home
- Interactive map of Milwaukee Soldiers Home
- 43.0265°N 87.97638°W
- Location: West Milwaukee, Wisconsin
- Nearest city: Milwaukee, Wisconsin

History
- Founded: 1867
- Built for: United States Veterans
- Original use: Recuperation of Civil War soldiers

Site notes
- Architectural style: Victorian
- Restored: 2020
- Restored by: Alexander Company
- Governing body: U.S. Department of Veterans Affairs
- Owner: Government

U.S. National Historic Landmark District – Contributing property

Milwaukee Soldiers Home is one of three soldiers homes which have survived in the United States. It was built for the rehabilitation of Civil War soldiers. The building is recognized as a National Historic Landmark District property. There are a total of 24 other buildings on the grounds which are also part of the Northwestern Branch, National Home for Disabled Volunteer Soldiers Historic District.

== History ==
The building was completed in 1867 and it went by several names, including National Asylum for Disabled Soldiers and National Home for Disabled Soldiers. The building was unoccupied starting in 1989, and had fallen into disrepair and was scheduled to be demolished. A 2011 campaign successfully got the building designated as a National Historic Landmark. In 2019 a company was hired to update the building. The Wisconsin Housing and Economic Development Authority (WHEDA) worked to help finance the restoration.

== See also ==
- Northwestern Branch, National Home for Disabled Volunteer Soldiers Historic District
- National Register of Historic Places listings in Milwaukee, Wisconsin
- National Historic Landmarks in Wisconsin
