= Namur station =

Namur station may refer to:

- Namur station (Montreal Metro), in Montreal, Quebec, Canada
- Namur railway station, in Namur, Belgium
- Porte de Namur metro station, in Brussels, Belgium

== See also ==
- Namur (disambiguation)
