= Dr. Fisk Holbrook Day House =

Historic house in Wisconsin, United States

- U.S. National Register of Historic Places
- U.S. National Historic Landmark
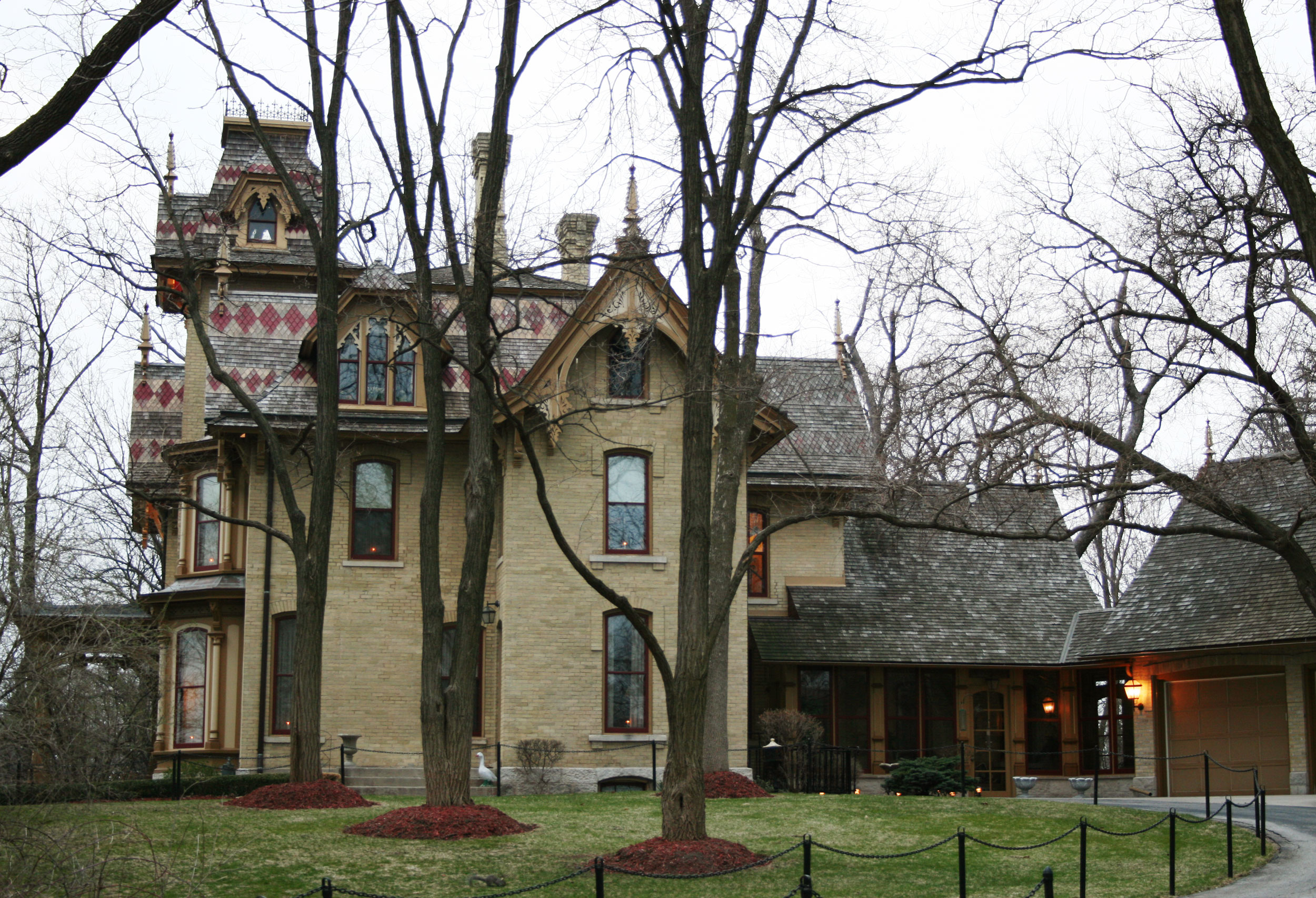

- Location within Wisconsin Location within the United States
- Location: 8000 W. Milwaukee Ave., Wauwatosa, Wisconsin
- Coordinates: 43°3′11.35″N 88°0′45.94″W
- Area: 1.6 acres (0.65 ha)
- Architect: James Douglas
- Architectural style: Second Empire, Italianate, Gothic
- NRHP reference No.: 97001268

Significant dates
- Added to NRHP: September 25, 1997
- Designated NHL: September 25, 1997

The Dr. Fisk Holbrook Day House, also known as Sunnyhill Home, is a historic house at 8000 West Milwaukee Avenue in Wauwatosa, Wisconsin. Built in 1874, it was the home of Doctor Fisk Holbrook Day (1826-1903), a prominent local physician and amateur geologist. The stylistically eclectic house was built in part to house Day's large collection of artifacts, and is the Milwaukee suburb's only major 19th-century mansion. It was declared a National Historic Landmark in 1997. It is privately owned and not open to the public.

== Description and history ==
The Dr. Fisk Holbrook Day House stands on Wauwatosa's west side, on the north side of West Milwaukee Avenue just west of Day Court. While originally on an eight acre plot when built, the house sits on just over an acre today. The house, set well back from the road, is accessed via both a long drive from West Milwaukee and a short drive off the west side of Day Court. It is a large 2 1/2-story brick building, with a rectangular main block extended to the rear and side by projections. The main block was previously covered by a mansard roof with patterned red and yellow cedar shingles on a bed of gray, with iron cresting at the top of the steep section. However, this roof was removed and replaced with an unpainted cedar roof in 2019. The projections and a single-story rear ell have steeply pitched gables in the Gothic style. The gables are decorated with ornate bargeboard trim. The front facade, oriented south toward the main road, is three bays wide, each bay stepped back from left to right. The central bay is topped by a mansarded three-story tower. The tower is accessible from the third story via a ladder. The interior has restored high-quality original woodwork and plaster, including a fine central staircase and marble fireplace surrounds. A carriage house originally stood at the east end of the property, but has since been replaced with a modern garage.

The house was built in 1874 for Fisk Holbrook Day to a design by architect James Douglas. It was the third of Day's houses in Wauwatosa, the other two having since been demolished. It was designed in part specifically to house his growing collection of paleontological artifacts, which are now in the possession of the University of Michigan. A prominent local physician, he was appointed to the county hospital commission, where he was influential in securing reforms of the local mental hospitals. During his free time he collected fossils at regional rock outcroppings, notably the Schoonmaker Reef, and corresponded with numerous high-profile professional geologists and paleontologists of the time.

Day moved out of this house after his wife died in 1893. The home last later owned by Mr. and Mrs. Abe Austin Jr., before being converted into multiple units as a rental property. The house fell into disrepair. The pianist Liberace once sought to purchase this home as the location for his museum in 1978. It has since undergone a careful restoration.

== See also ==
- List of National Historic Landmarks in Wisconsin
- National Register of Historic Places listings in Milwaukee County, Wisconsin
