= Fisk Holbrook Day =

American physician

Fisk Holbrook Day (1826–1903) was a physician and an amateur geologist in Wisconsin who developed an impressive collection of Silurian-age fossils. The collection is now at Harvard University.

Day was born on March 11, 1826, in Richmond, New York. He graduated from Jefferson Medical College in Philadelphia, Pennsylvania, in 1849. He moved to Wauwatosa, Wisconsin, and lived there for 40 years, "and at one time was considered its most prominent citizen." He became the first physician to serve as Superintendent of the Milwaukee County hospital and led in many reforms for the hospital and for a system of county insane asylums throughout Wisconsin.

He once could sell a trilobite for "the then-extravagant sum of $100". The fossil trilobite was named Bumastus dayi in honor of Day.

One of the primary places he collected was at the Schoonmaker Quarry, which professional geologist/paleontologist James Hall had recognized in 1862 as the first known fossil reef in North America. "Day supplied specimens and information to other professional geologists, including Fielding Bradford Meek (Smithsonian Institution), Charles Doolittle Walcott (future Director of the U.S. Geological Survey and Secretary of the Smithsonian Institution), E.O. Ulrich (later of the U.S. Geological Survey), Samuel Colvin (University of Iowa), Edward Drinker Cope (world renown vertebrate paleontologist from Philadelphia), A. W. Vogdes (San Diego Natural History Society), Nathan Shaler (Harvard University) and Thomas C. Chamberlin (at various times State Geologist of Wisconsin, President of the University of Wisconsin, and Founder and Head of the Geology Department at the University of Chicago). In addition to his interactions with professional scientists, Day corresponded and exchanged specimens with amateur naturalists around the country."

The Dr. Fisk Holbrook Day House was declared a National Historic Landmark in 1997.

Day collaborated with Thomas Greene whose former home, the Thomas A. Green Memorial Museum and Collection is now a museum and is also designated an NHL. Day died in Lansing, Michigan, on May 30, 1903.
