= Northwestern Branch, National Home for Disabled Volunteer Soldiers Historic District =

Historic district in Wisconsin, United States

- U.S. National Register of Historic Places
- U.S. National Historic Landmark District
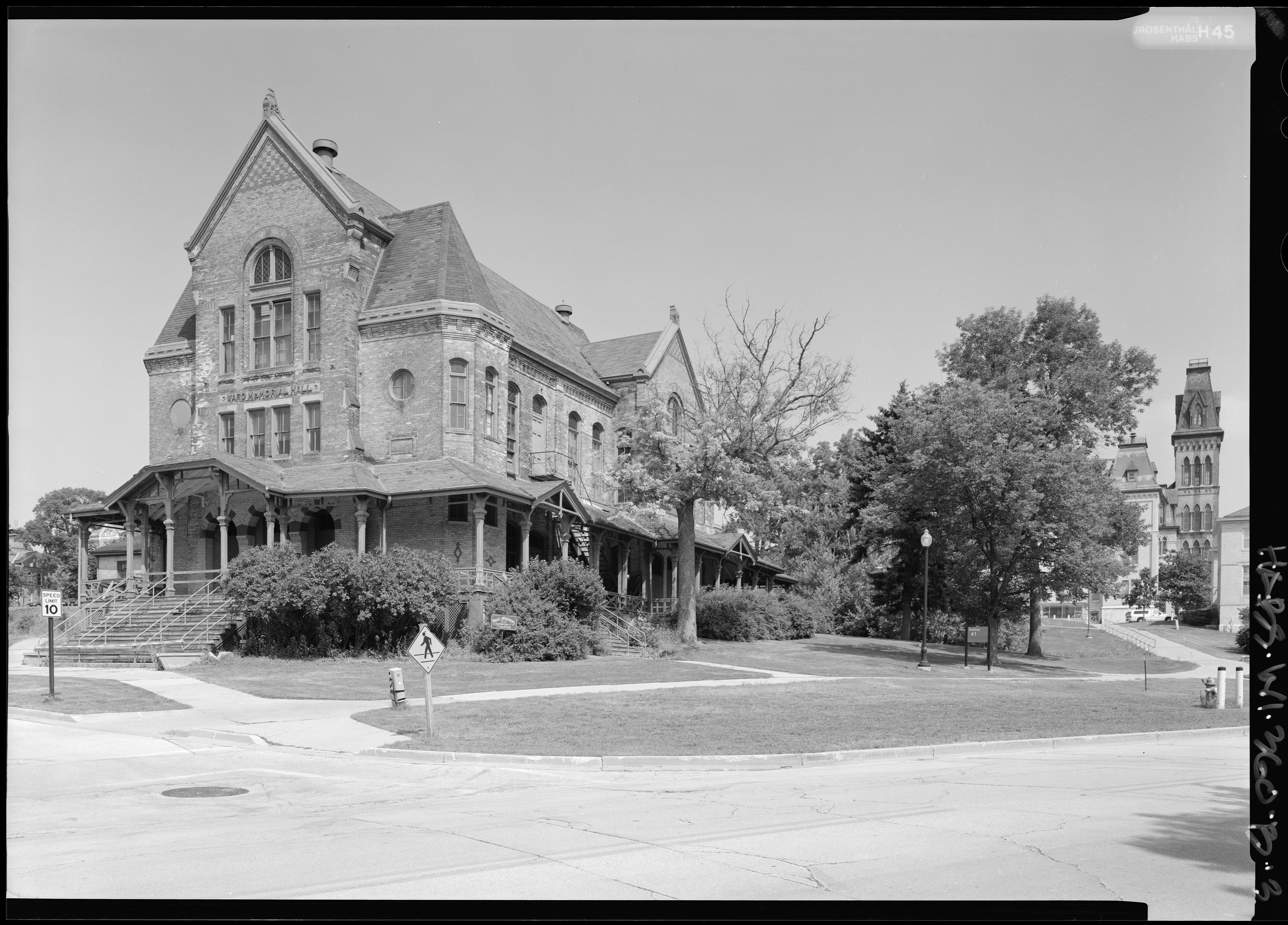
- Ward Memorial Hall at the Milwaukee Soldiers Home
- Location: 5000 West National Avenue, Milwaukee, Wisconsin
- Coordinates: 43.0265°N 87.97789°W
- NRHP reference No.: 05000530

Significant dates
- Added to NRHP: June 3, 2005
- Designated NHLD: June 17, 2011

The Northwestern Branch, National Home for Disabled Volunteer Soldiers Historic District is a veterans' hospital located in Milwaukee, Wisconsin, with roots going back to the Civil War. Contributing buildings in the district were constructed from 1867 to 1955, and the 90 acres (36 ha) historic district of the Milwaukee Soldiers Home campus lies within the 400 acres (160 ha) Clement J. Zablocki VA Medical Center grounds, just west of American Family Field.

== History ==
In 1865 Abraham Lincoln approved a "National Asylum" to care for volunteer Union soldiers who had been wounded during the Civil War. The Northwestern Branch of the National Home for Disabled Volunteer Soldiers was established in 1866, as an old soldiers' home in the then northwestern region of United States. The Wisconsin Soldiers' Home Society transferred the money and property already acquired by that group to the federal effort for the National Asylum for Disabled Volunteer Soldiers, renamed the National Home for Disabled Volunteer Soldiers in 1873. The Eastern Branch was opened in 1866 at a former resort in Togus, Maine. The Central Branch was established in 1867 outside of Dayton, Ohio. The Northwestern and Central Branches had ambitious building campaigns that erected large-scale institutional structures within carefully designed landscapes.

The Main Building (Milwaukee Soldiers Home (Old Main)), designed in the Victorian Second Empire style by Milwaukee architect E. Townsend Mix, was completed in 1869. The large structure used a centralized model, housing all the services and soldiers within it. Expansion of the membership and a shift towards a decentralized model in the 1880s and 1890s resulted in the construction of a number of specialized new buildings at the Milwaukee Soldiers Home. The Italianate-styled Governor's Residence was added around 1867, probably also a design of E. T. Mix. In 1879 a new hospital was built west of the Main Building. This structure was the first major step toward creating the cluster of buildings that define the historic core of the campus.

Medal of Honor recipient James K. L. Duncan lived at the home from 1910 until his death in 1913.

The Milwaukee firm of Henry C. Koch was the architect for many buildings during this period of expansion including the hospital (1879), Ward Memorial Hall (1882), the chapel (1889), Wadsworth Library (1892), and the 1896 Colonial Revival-styled headquarters building (1894). Ward Memorial Hall is an 1882 theater−meeting room, store, restaurant, and railroad ticket office.

A group of maintenance buildings sits in front of the Main Building by the railroad, including the 1895 simple brick Quartermaster's Storehouse, the 1938 Paint Shop, a 1941 garage, and three quonset storage huts built in 1947. The 1957 engineering warehouse and shops are not considered contributing to the NRHP district.

In 1930 the National Home for Disabled Volunteer Soldiers, the Pension Bureau, and the Veterans' Bureau were combined under the new Veterans Administration. The Northwestern Branch became known as the Wood, Wisconsin, station of the Veterans' Administration.

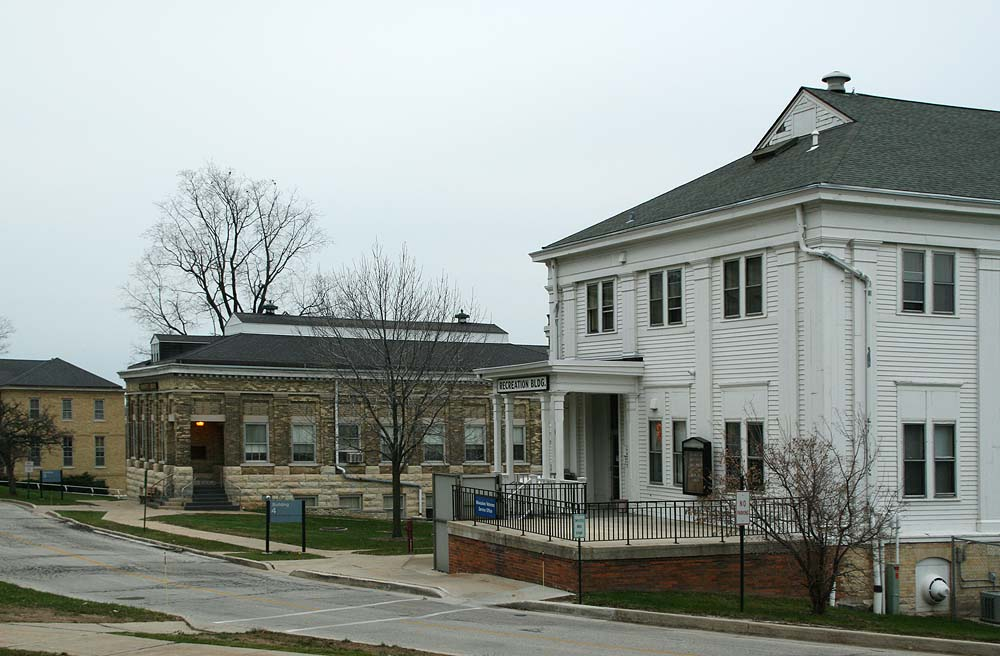
Milwaukee Soldiers Home buildings.

== Present day ==
The district was added to the National Register of Historic Places in 2005, and designated a National Historic Landmark in 2011. It is on the National Trust for Historic Preservation List of 11 Most Endangered Historic Places.

Some of the buildings are now used for the Clement J. Zablocki VA Medical Center by the United States Department of Veterans Affairs, located just west of American Family Field and the Soldiers' Home Reef rock formation. Six of the most historic buildings are currently undergoing a $40 million restoration that will result in the creation of 101 units of supportive housing for veterans and their families.

== See also ==
- Soldiers' Home Reef
- National Register of Historic Places listings in Milwaukee, Wisconsin
- Old soldiers' homes in the United States
- National Historic Landmarks in Wisconsin
