= Thomas A. Greene =

American geologist (1827–1894)

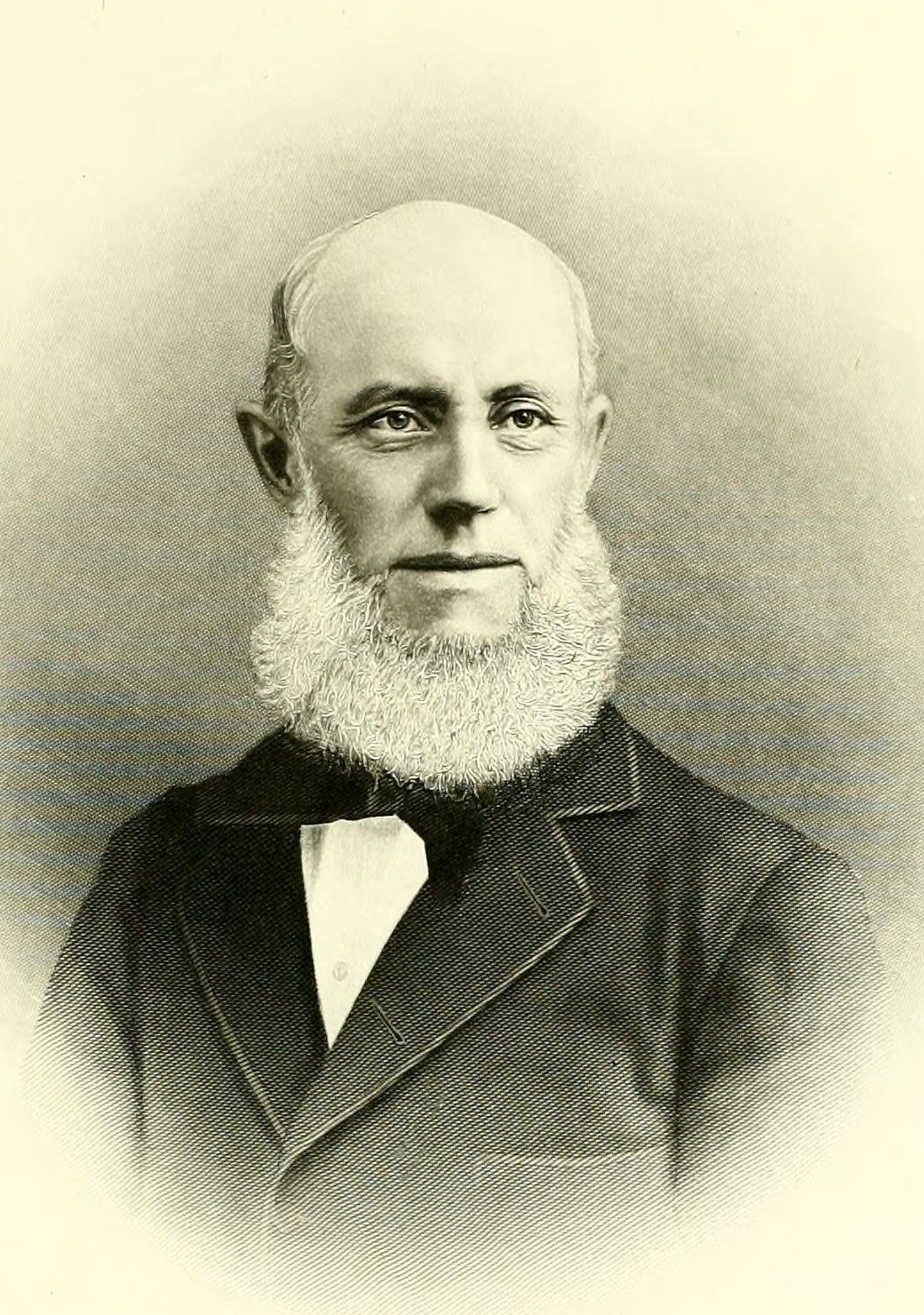
- From History of Milwaukee from its first settlement to the year 1895 (1895)
- Born: November 2, 1827; Providence, Rhode Island, U.S.
- Died: September 7, 1894 (aged 66); Milwaukee, Wisconsin, U.S.
- Resting place: Forest Home Cemetery, Milwaukee
- Occupation: Pharmacist
- Known for: Thomas A. Greene Memorial Museum
- Spouse: Elizabeth L. Cadle (m. 1857; died 1892)
- Children: Mary (Upham); Howard Greene

Thomas Arnold Greene (November 2, 1827 – September 7, 1894) was an American pharmacist and amateur geologist. He is known for his collection of fossils and minerals which were preserved by his family in a museum known as the Thomas A. Greene Memorial Museum.

== Biography ==
Thomas A. Greene was born Providence, Rhode Island, in November 1827. His parents were Quakers, and after his mother's death in 1835, he was sent to a Quaker boarding school, where he remained for eight years. From there, he went to a collegiate school in Point Hill, Rhode Island, where he remained until age 17. That year, he went to work at the retail drug store of Chapin & Thurber in Providence, where he decided to follow that career. He received a thorough education in the pharmacy business, and, in 1848, he went off on his own to start a drug store in the west.

He arrived in Milwaukee on July 4, 1848, and described in his diary that he liked it better than any other place he'd ever been. He briefly looked for opportunities further south, in Kenosha and Chicago, but returned to Milwaukee and bought out the drug store of Henry Fess, on East Water Street, where the Pabst Building would later stand. He formed a partnership with Dr. Harry H. Button, a friend from Rhode Island, and they formed a firm under the name Greene & Button; their partnership endured until Button's death in 1890.

They had years of success as retail druggists, but gradually moved into wholesaling, which eventually took over their entire business. They reincorporated as the Greene-Button Company in 1873 and became one of Milwaukee's most extensive wholesale drug operations.

== Geology collection ==
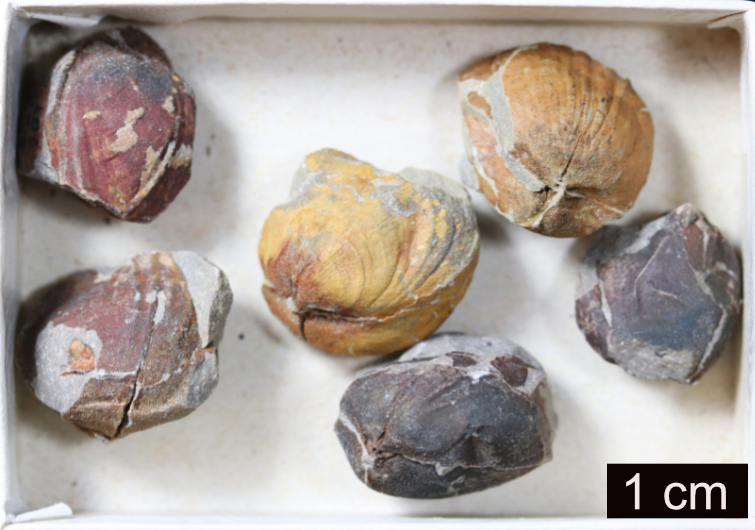
The brachiopod Eumetabolotoechia greeni (Cleland, 1911) from the Milwaukee Formation, Middle Devonian, Wisconsin.

From his early childhood, he was deeply interested in botany and geology. Over years, he spent his free time gathering specimens and studying paleontology, often in collaboration with fellow amateur geologist Fisk Holbrook Day. Greene became a trustee of the Milwaukee Public Museum and a member of the American Association for the Advancement of Science. By the time of his death he held a large collection of minerals, as well as Devonian and Silurian fossils—possibly the largest private collection in the country at that time—and kept an extensive diary of his scientific observations.

His collection has the distinction of being the sole major nineteenth century Milwaukee area fossil collection to remain intact and in the area.

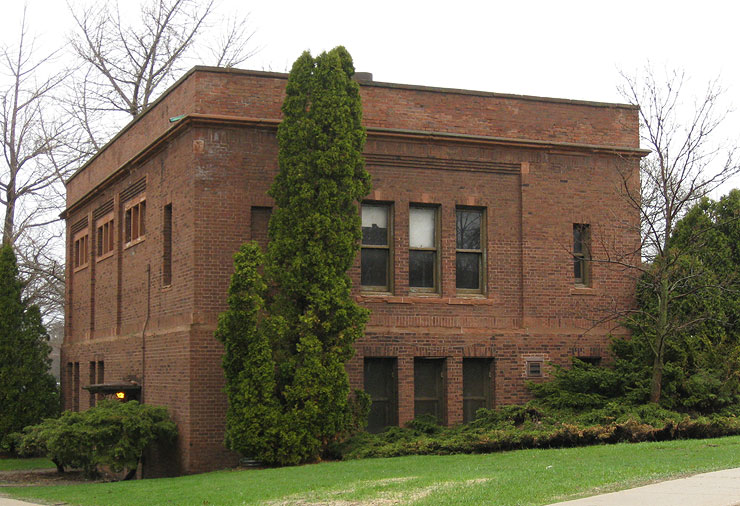
Thomas A. Greene Memorial Museum on the University of Wisconsin–Milwaukee campus.

He died at his home in Milwaukee in 1894. After his death, his heirs erected a fireproof building in 1913 to house his collection. Known as the Thomas A. Greene Memorial Museum, the building and collection were collectively designated a National Historic Landmark in 1993. The collection was later removed from the building, and is now maintained at Lapham Hall on the University of Wisconsin-Milwaukee campus in a compactor storage system and on display in a small museum area.
