= Namur Historic District =

Historic district in Wisconsin, United States

- Namur Belgian-American District
- U.S. National Register of Historic Places
- U.S. National Historic Landmark District
- Location within Wisconsin Location within the United States
- Location: Namur, Wisconsin
- Coordinates: 44°44′3″N 87°39′59″W
- Area: 3,500 acres (1,400 ha)
- Architect: Varies
- NRHP reference No.: 87002553

Significant dates
- Added to NRHP: November 6, 1989
- Designated NHLD: December 14, 1990

The Namur Historic District, also known as the Namur Belgian-American District, is a historic district in southwestern Door County, Wisconsin. The district includes the community of Namur and a rural landscape extending 3 miles (4.8 km) to its north. It contains one of the nation's highest concentrations of immigrant Belgian and Belgian-American culture, land use, and architecture. It was declared a National Historic Landmark in 1990.

== Description and history ==
In the 1850s, in response to a drive by the state of Wisconsin to increase settlement of its rural areas, immigrants from Belgium began to arrive in the state. Originating in the provinces of Namur and Brabant, they settled on the eastern shore areas of Brown, Kewaunee, and Door counties. They used indigenous materials in combination with traditional building practices imported from their homeland to construct an architecturally distinct landscape. Houses were typically built out of either red brick or limestone, with frame outbuildings. In the 1860 and 1870 censuses Wisconsin had a higher percentage of Belgian-origin residents than any other state. The area around the village of Namur was judged in a wide-ranging survey of Belgian-settled areas to best represent this influx.

The historic district is basically rectangular in shape, with the village of Namur just north of its southern boundary. To the west and north, it is bordered by Green Bay and County Road "K", and to the east it is bordered by the properties on Thruway Road. Covering about 3,500 acres (1,400 ha), the district includes over 180 historically significant buildings, most of them farm-related buildings. There are 41 separate farmsteads, each averaging more than five buildings. Properties were typically developed between 1880 and 1930. Non-residential properties include the St. Mary's Catholic Church and parsonage house in Namur, and the Harold Euclide General Store, built in 1916.

== Gallery ==
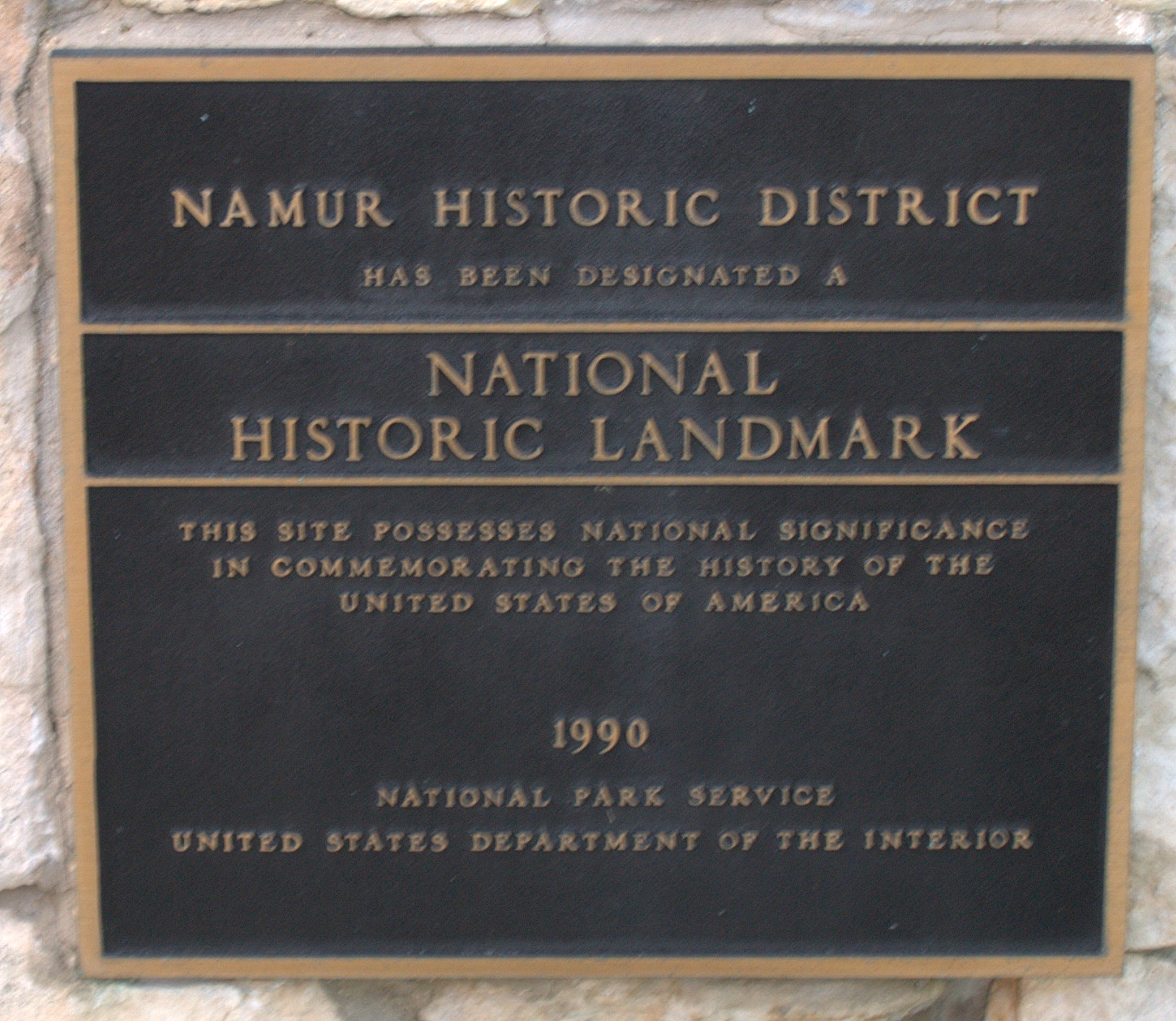
Historical Plaque Near Namur

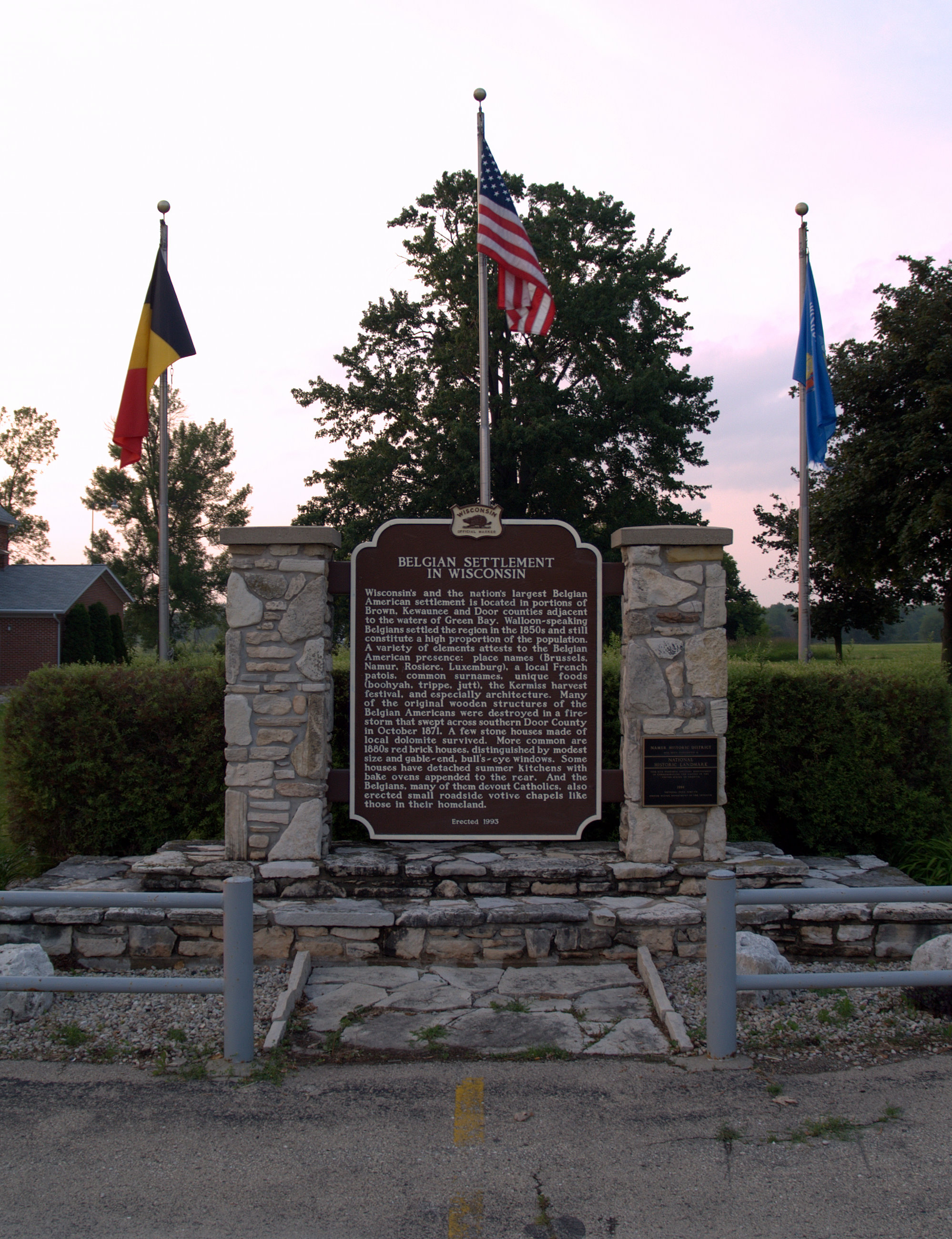
Historical Marker Near Namur

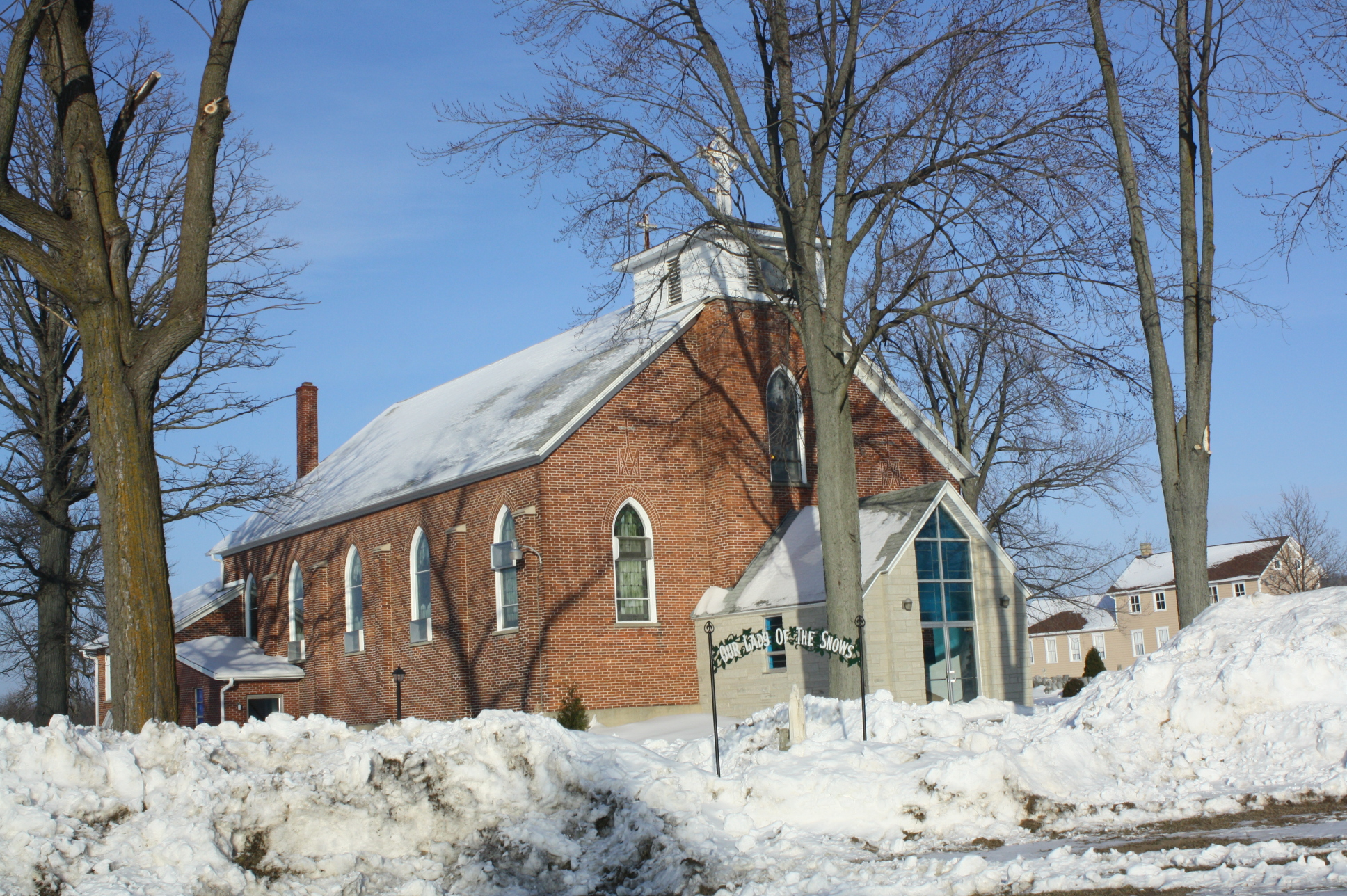
Our Lady of the Snows church

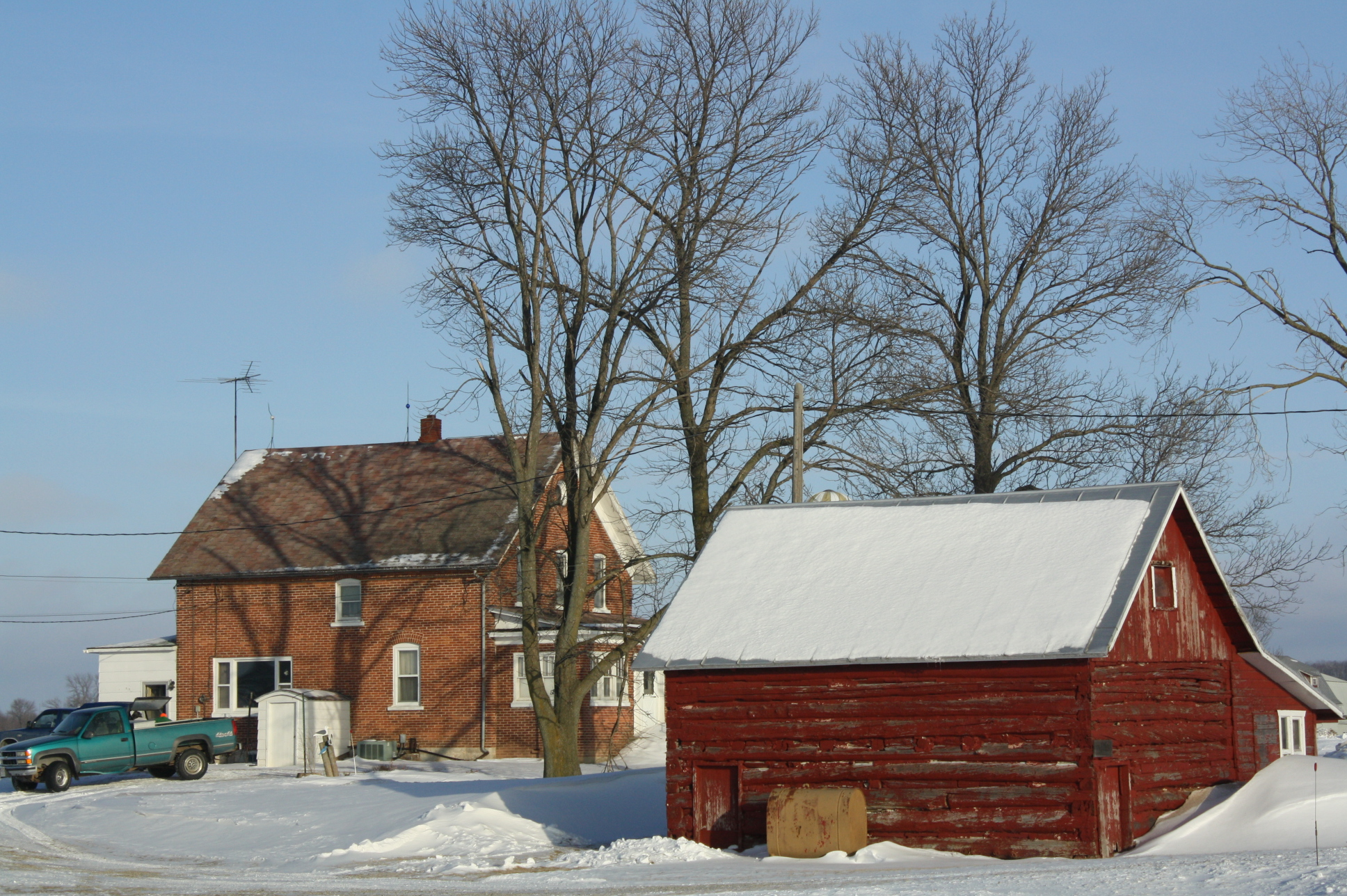
Brick house and log shed

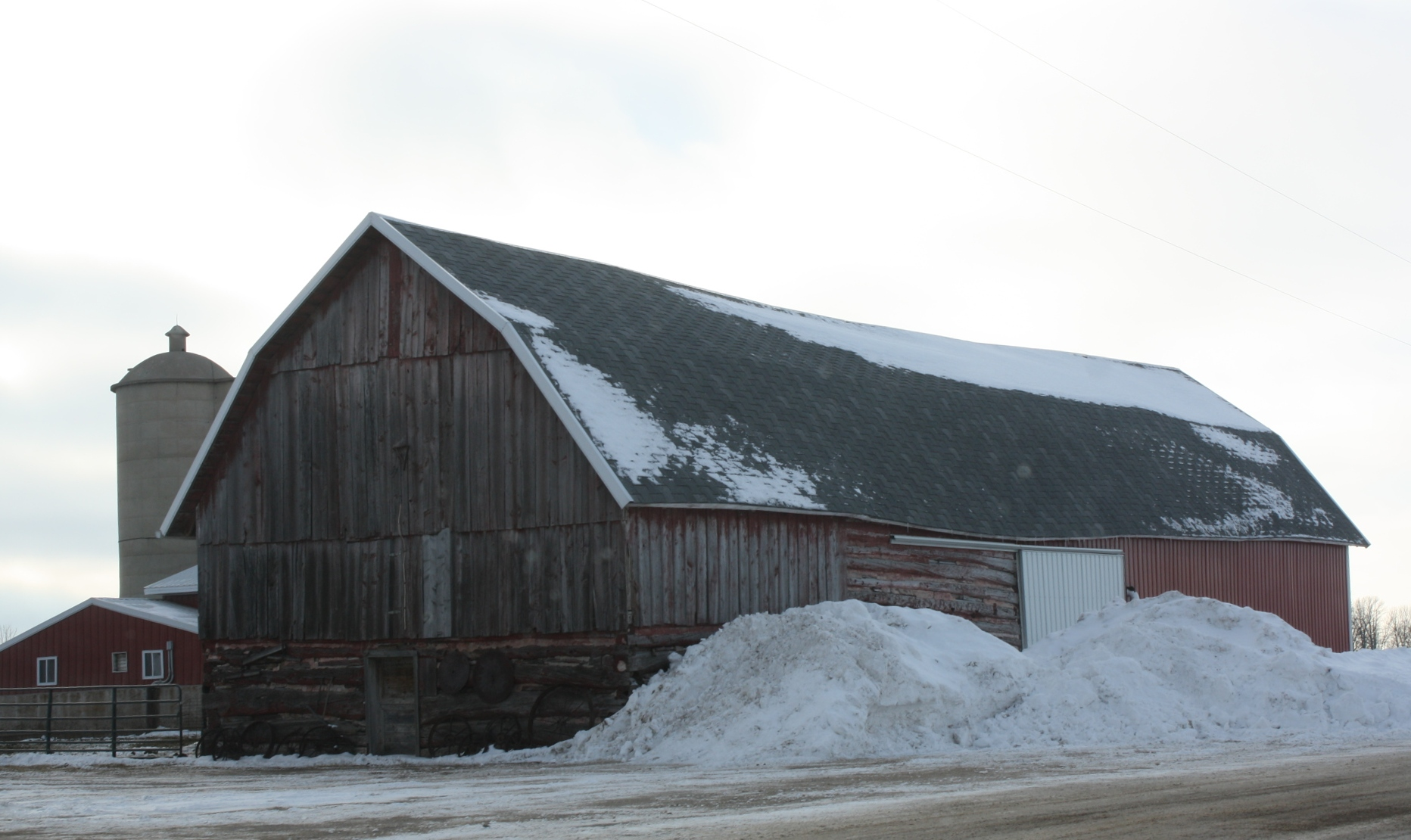
Log barn

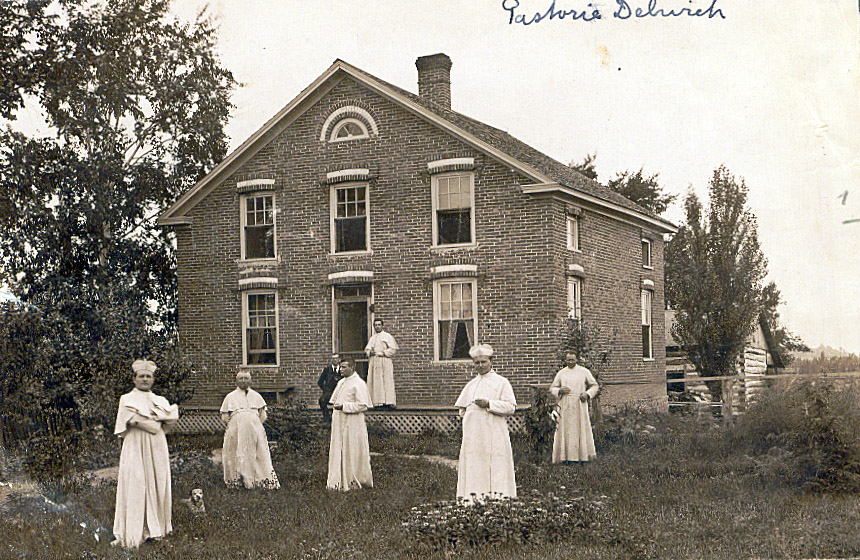
School run by the St. Norbert Abbey c. 1897; a marker honoring the location of this school at the historic district claims it as the birthplace of the Norbertine Fathers St. Norbert Abbey today is located in De Pere.

== See also ==
- List of National Historic Landmarks in Wisconsin
- National Register of Historic Places listings in Door County, Wisconsin
