= Soldiers' Home Reef =

- U.S. National Register of Historic Places
- U.S. National Historic Landmark
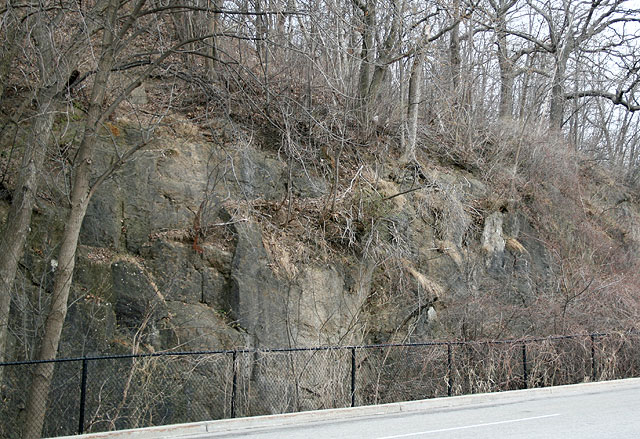

- Location within Wisconsin Location within the United States
- Location: Milwaukee, Wisconsin
- Coordinates: 43°1′40″N 87°58′29″W
- Built: Silurian period fossilized coral reef.
- NRHP reference No.: 93001617

Significant dates
- Added to NRHP: November 4, 1993
- Designated NHL: November 4, 1993

Soldiers' Home Reef, also known as Rocky Point, National Military Asylum Reef, or Veterans' Hill is a fossilized coral reef rock formation in Milwaukee, Wisconsin. The reef formation was discovered by geologist Increase A. Lapham in the 1830s. It and other fossilized coral reefs that he discovered were the first geological reef formations described in North America, and are among the first described in the world. This reef was declared a National Historic Landmark in 1993.

== Setting ==
The formation is located northeast of the junction of Wood Avenue and General Mitchell Boulevard, on the Clement J. Zablocki Veterans Affairs Medical Center grounds. It consists of the lower 35 feet (11 m) of a 70-foot (21 m) high bluff extending east–west for a distance of about 450 feet (140 m). The bluff is the only fully natural formation of its type remaining in Milwaukee County. It is located on the northern border of the VA grounds.

== History ==
Soldiers' Home Reef was formed during the Silurian period of the Paleozoic Era, about 400 million years ago, when Wisconsin lay under a shallow tropical sea. Beneath that sea, ancient corals constructed the reef where trilobites, cephalopods, brachiopods, pelmatozoans, bivalves, and bryozoans lived and were eventually preserved as limestone. In more recent geologic time, the hard limestone mound was overrun by one or more glaciers, but resisted the grinding action, forming a roche moutonnée, which was then covered by glacial deposits, then exposed again by the Menomonee River's erosion.

The formation was first identified as archaeologically important by Increase Lapham, an amateur geologist who is considered Wisconsin's first great scientist. He collected various fossils here in the 1830s, at Schoonmaker Reef in Wauwatosa in the 1840s, and at other sites nearby. Lapham was aware that these blocks of fossil-dense limestone were quite different from the surrounding rock formations, but didn't grasp that these were reefs. Instead he thought they must be remnants of a larger layer of fossil-bearing limestone that had eroded away.

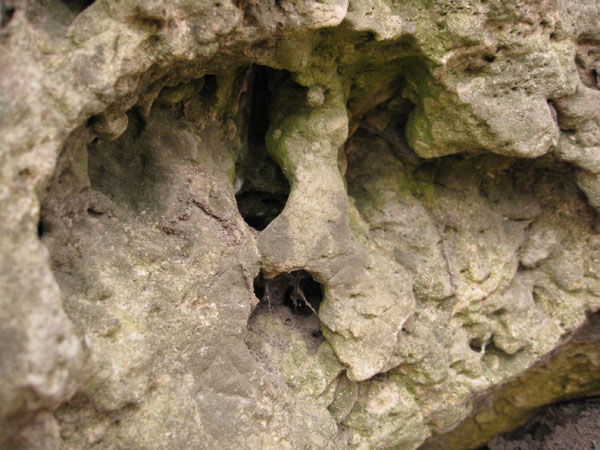
A closeup of fossilized reef material.

In the 1850s Lapham sent some of his fossils to be identified by paleontologist James Hall in New York. Hall was interested in the finds and visited Milwaukee in the 1850s. Looking at the remnant fossilized coral mound at Soldiers' Home Reef and others like it, Hall noticed their difference from the surrounding flat rocks, and realized that the mounds were not remnants of a larger layer, but were individual reefs. He published this revelation in 1862 - the first identification of fossilized reefs in North America and among the first in the world. It was one of three formations he identified; the other two have since been destroyed by quarrying and other alterations.

Further understanding came when Thomas Chrowder Chamberlin noted that each fossilized reef in the area contained a somewhat different community of creatures, in his 1877 Geology of Eastern Wisconsin. He used comparisons of the Soldiers' Home reef and two others nearby to develop models of ancient reef development.

The formation continued to be of significant interest to paleontologists until 1939. The two other limestone mounds that helped Lapham, Hall and Chamberlin understand the fossilized reefs have been greatly damaged if not destroyed by quarrying, but Soldiers' Home Reef remains much as when they studied it - still a mound with glacial deposits over fossil-bearing limestone.

== See also ==
- National Home for Disabled Volunteer Soldiers, Northwestern Branch
- Schoonmaker Reef
- List of National Historic Landmarks in Wisconsin
- National Register of Historic Places listings in Milwaukee
- Silurian geology of Wisconsin
