= Namur, Wisconsin =

- Unincorporated community
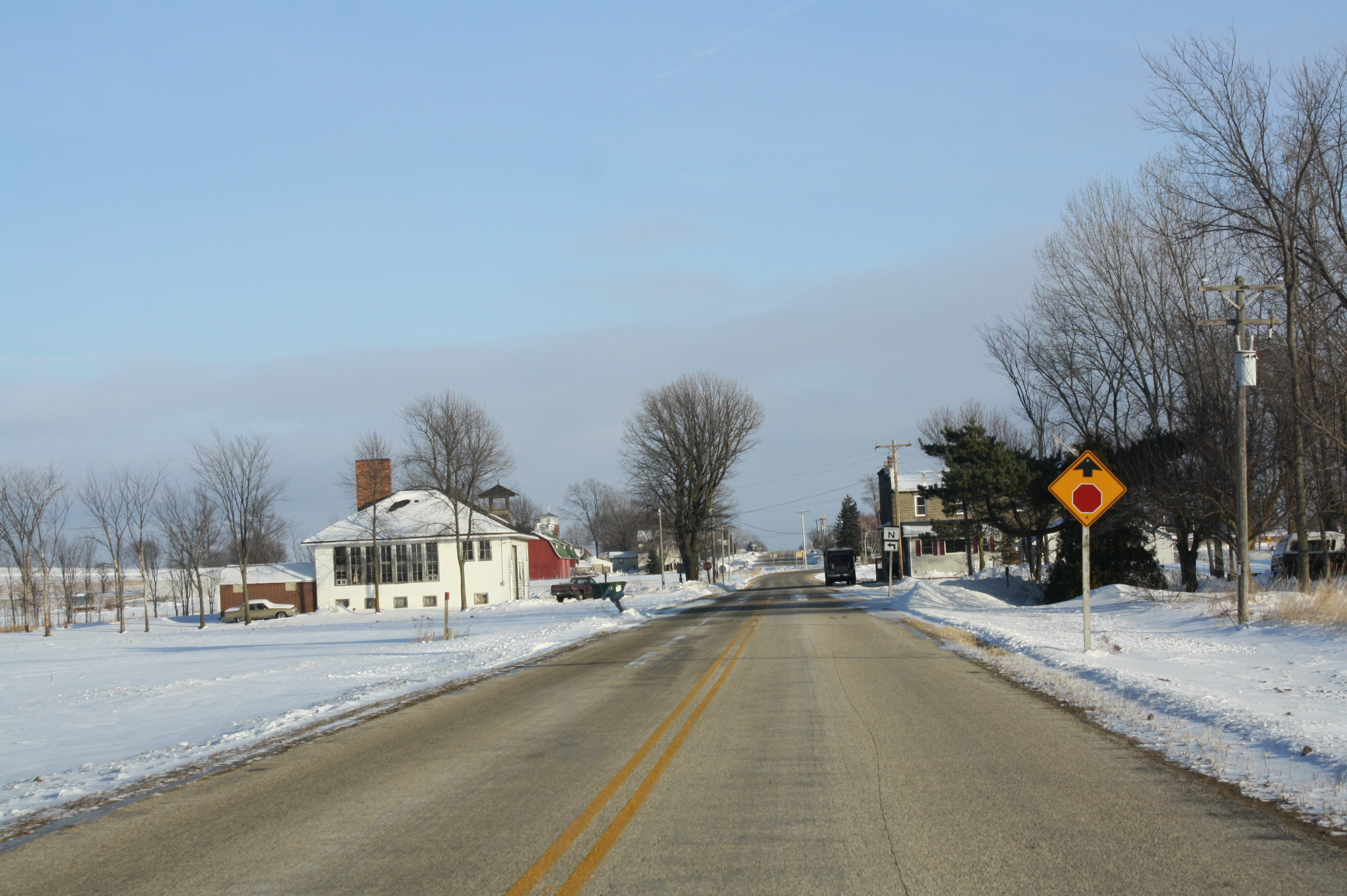
- Looking east in downtown Namur

- Location within the state of Wisconsin
- Coordinates: 44°44′3″N 87°40′11″W
- Country: United States
- State: Wisconsin
- County: Door
- Town: Union
- Named for: Namur, Belgium
- Time zone: UTC-6 (Central (CST))
  - Summer (DST): UTC-5 (CDT)
- Area code: 920

Namur (/næˈmʊər/ nam-OOR) is an unincorporated community in the town of Union in Door County, Wisconsin, United States. The community is located on County Road DK (Old Wisconsin Highway 57) at its intersection with County Road N. It is located approximately five miles west of the unincorporated community of Brussels. The community is located inside the Namur Historic District, a historic district of farms near the community.

== History ==
The community name was established in the mid 1800s as Delwiche because services were held in the Guillaume Delwiche family home until a church was built.

In 1860, Our Lady of the Snows Catholic church was built, marking the first construction of a church in the surrounding area.

The name was later changed to Namur (1880-1905), a name applied to the post office run by Clement Geniesse that functioned there. Then when Fairland School was built the community became known as Fairland. In 1962 the National Belgian Village committee made request to the Wisconsin Highway Commission that the unincorporated community name return to Namur.

== Gallery ==
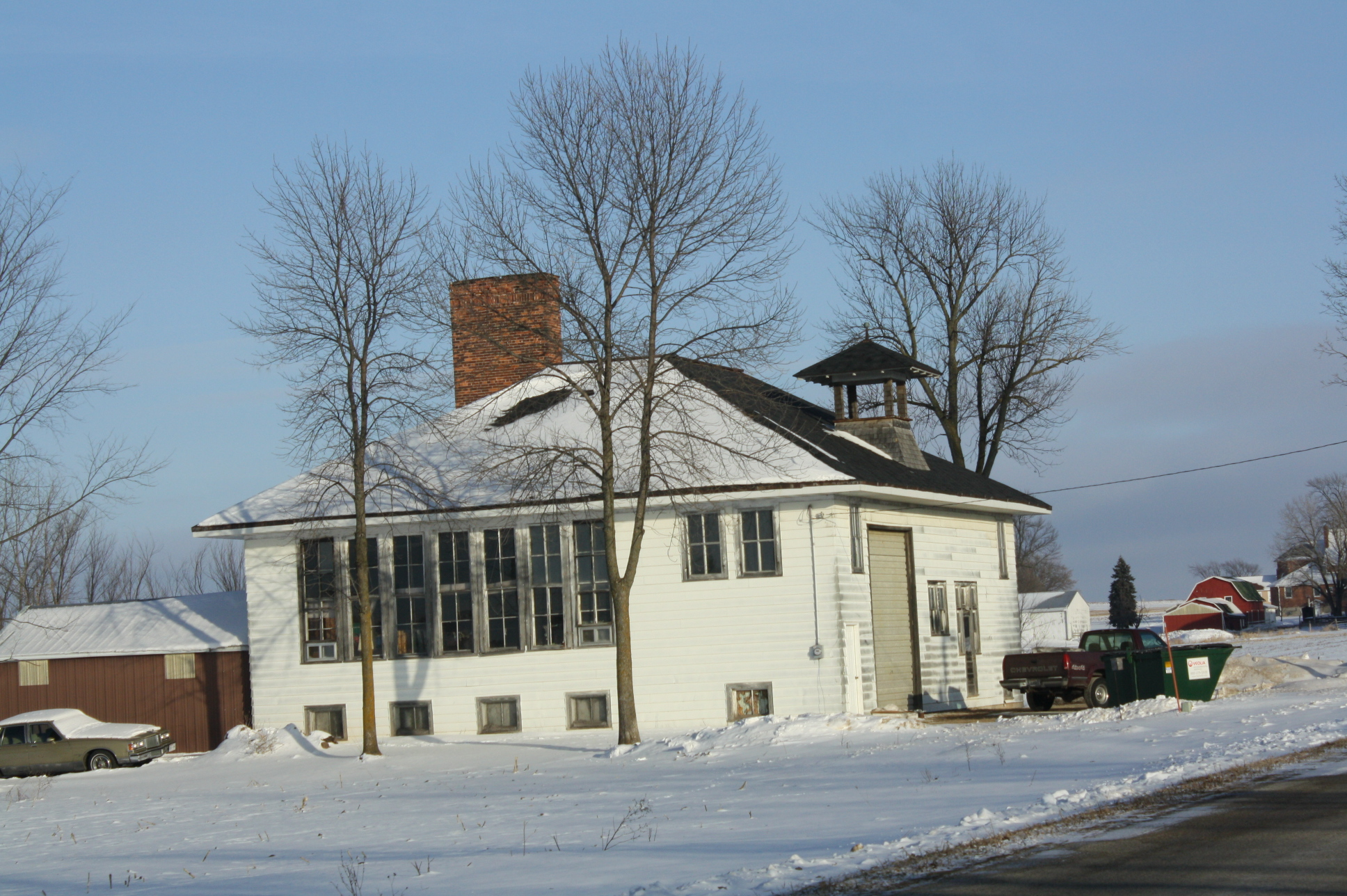
Elementary school

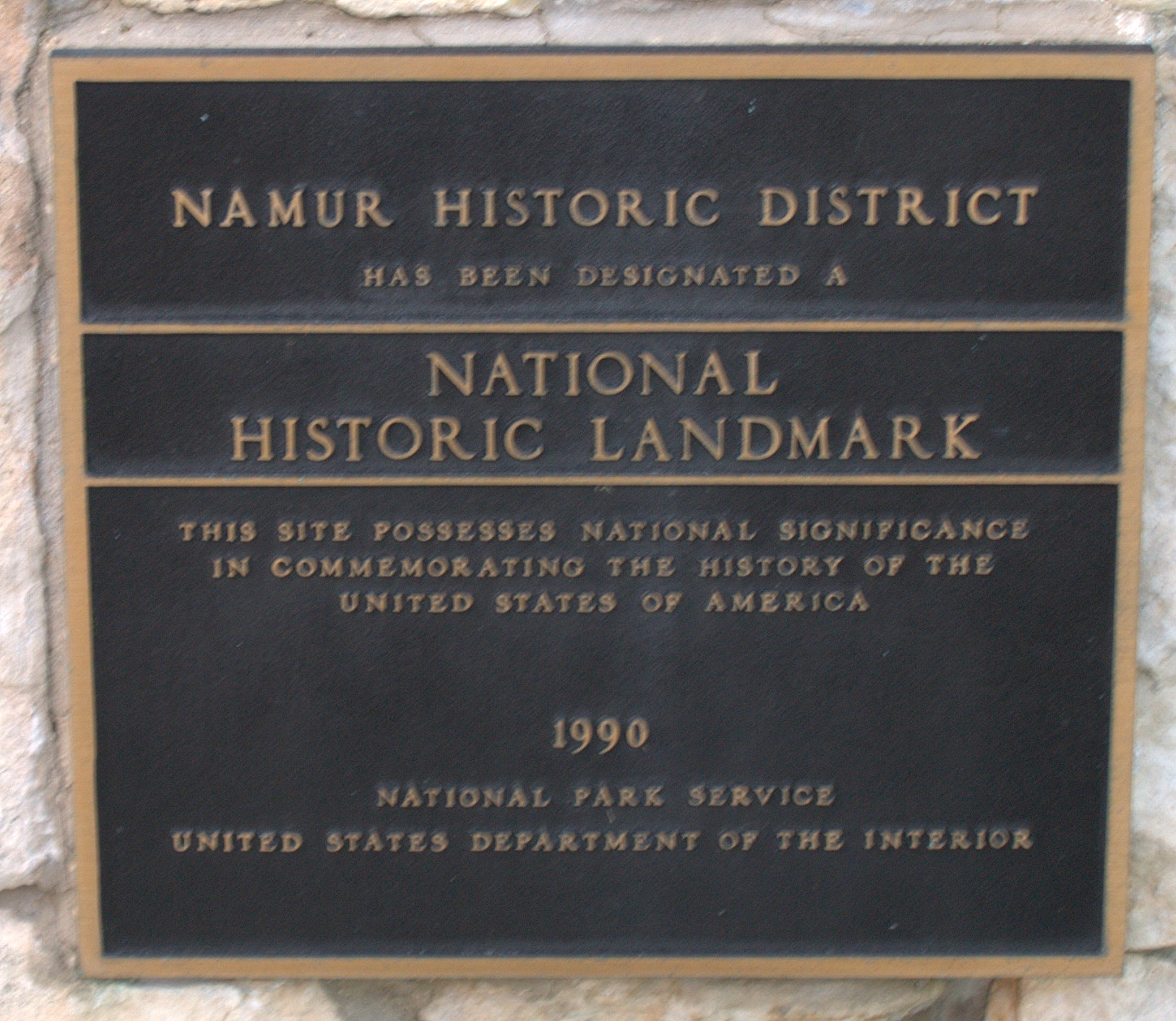
Historical Marker Near Namur

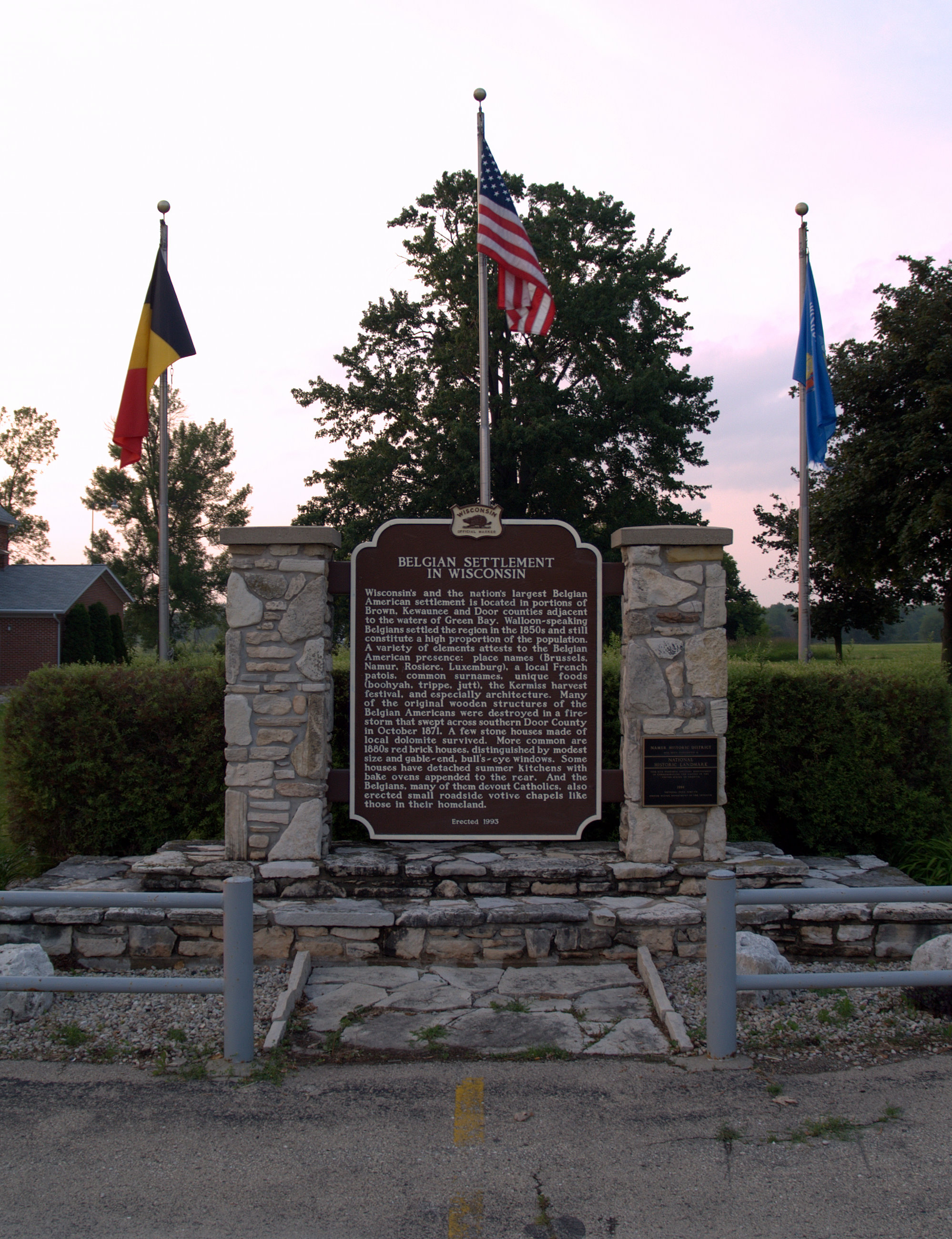
Historical Marker Near Namur

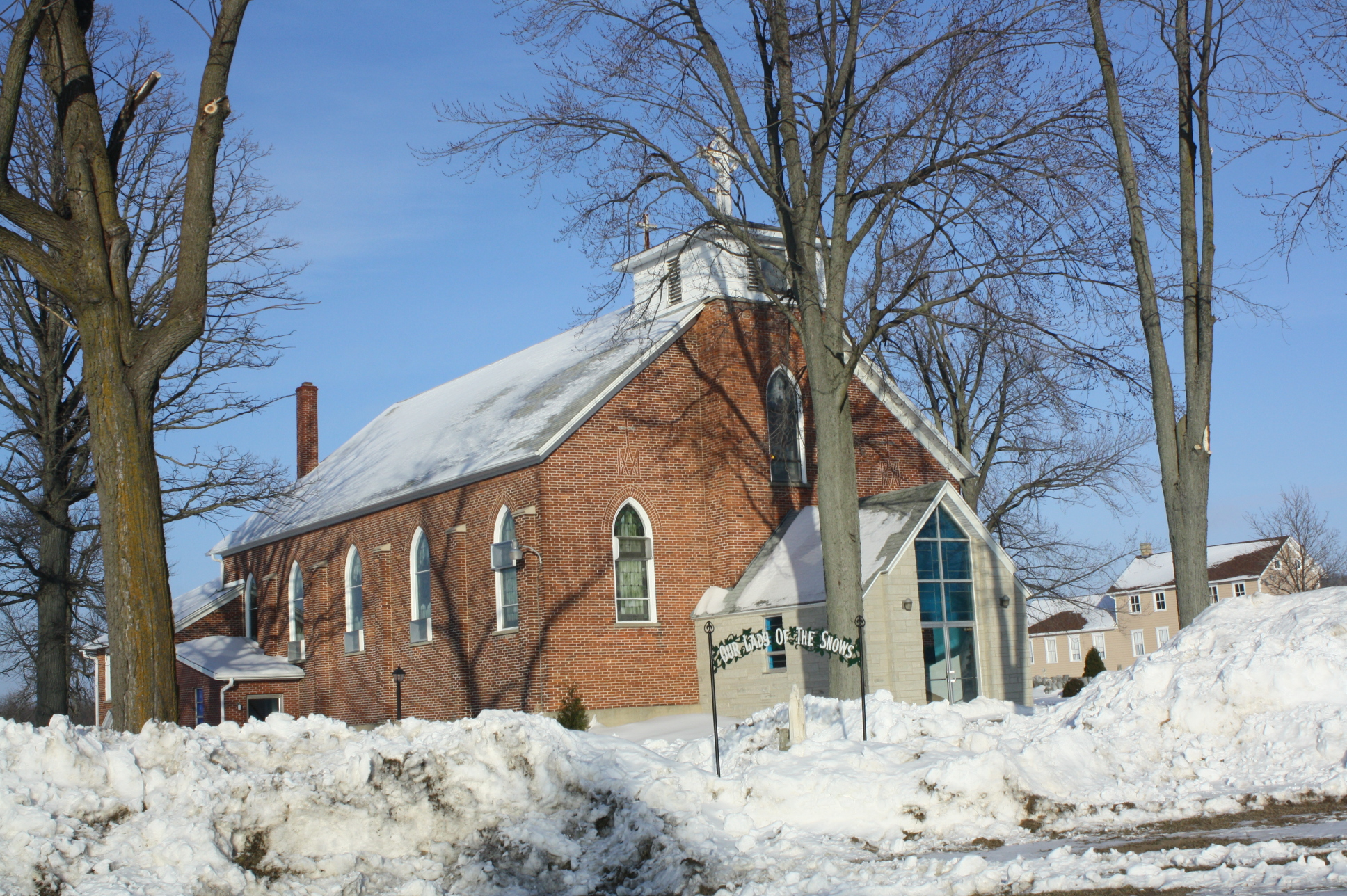
Our Lady of the Snows church

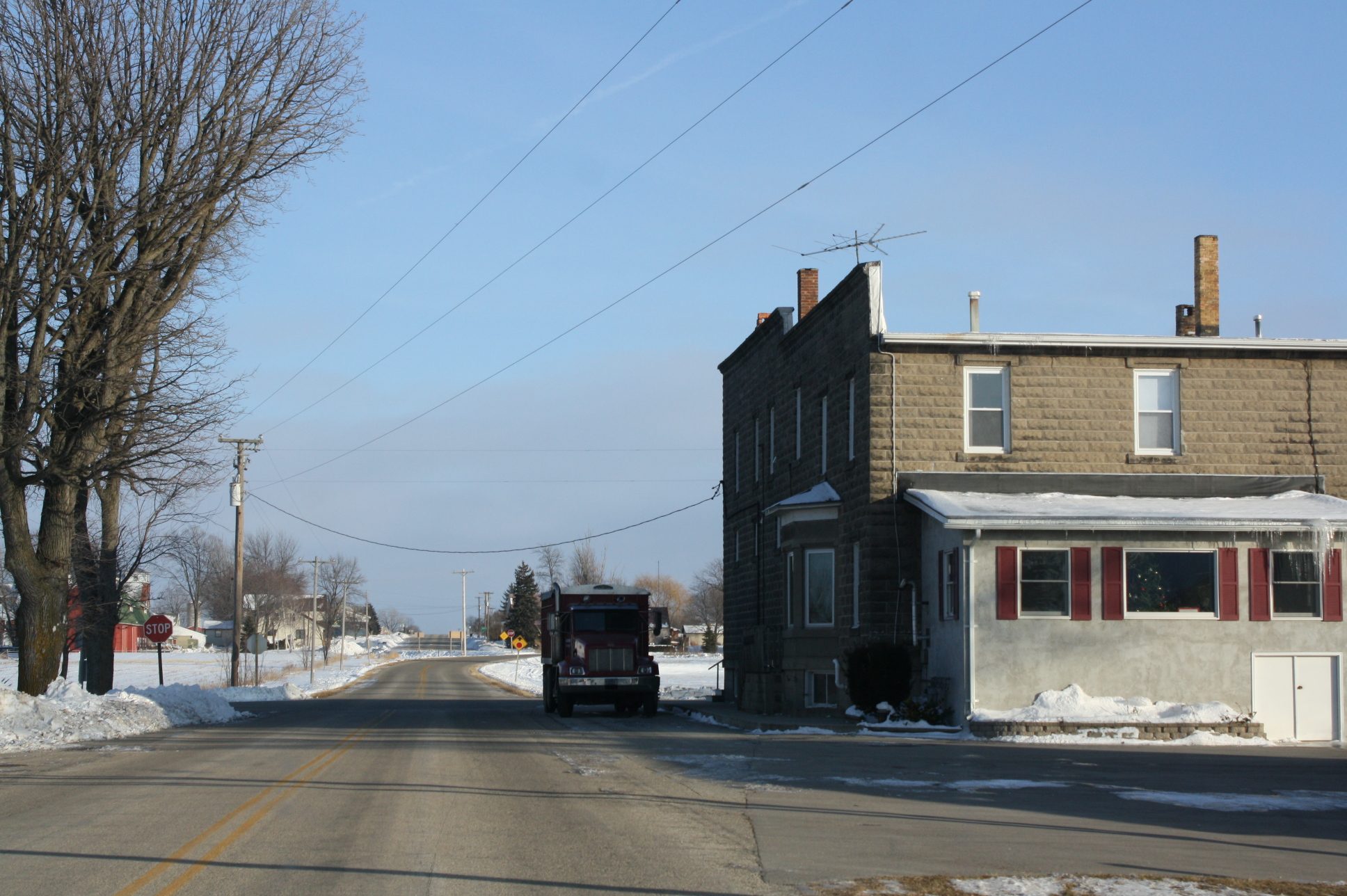
General store

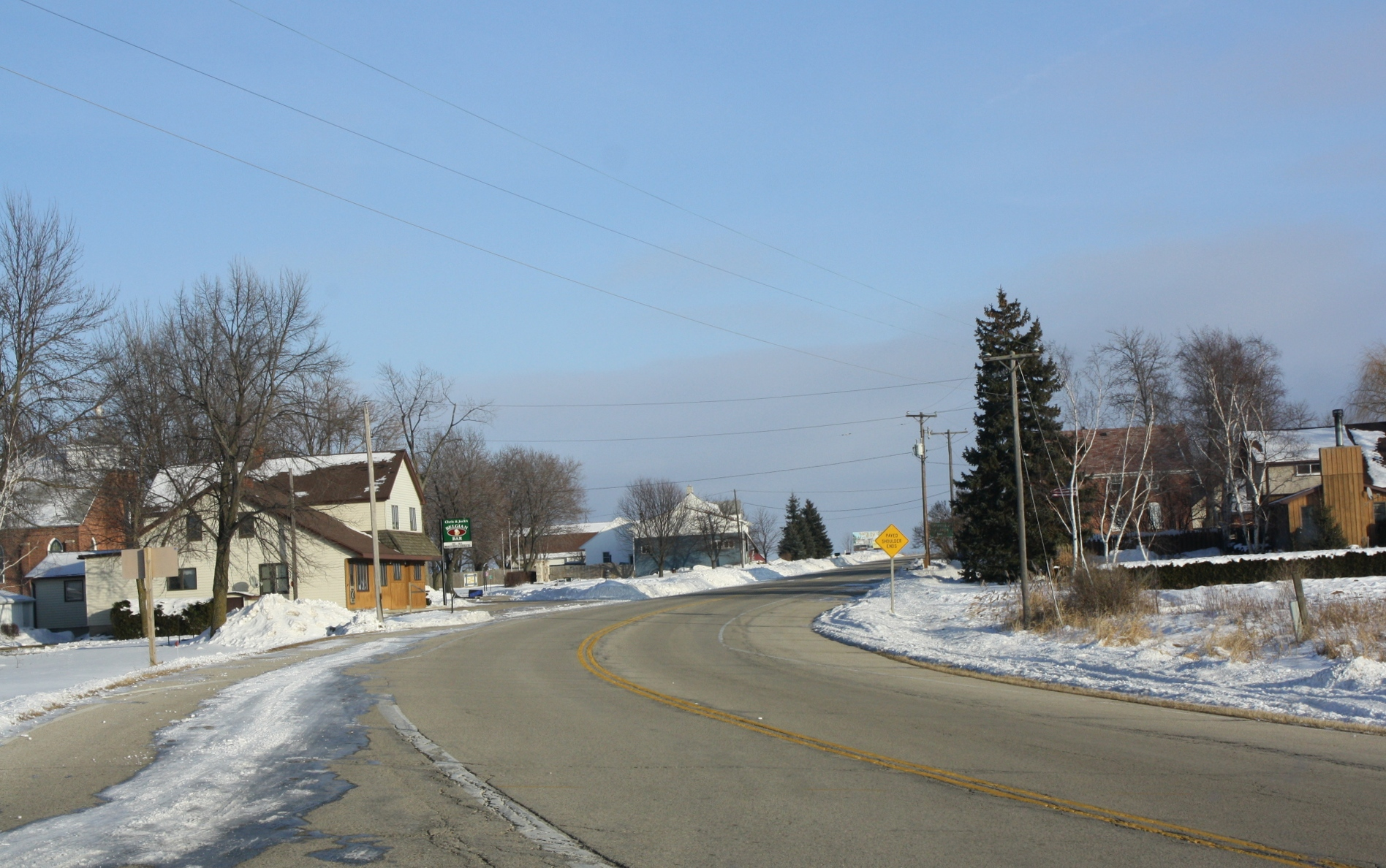
Looking northeast on the former Wisconsin Highway 57
