= National Register of Historic Places listings in Crawford County, Wisconsin =

Location of Crawford County in Wisconsin

This is a list of the National Register of Historic Places listings in Crawford County, Wisconsin. It is intended to provide a comprehensive listing of entries in the National Register of Historic Places that are located in Crawford County, Wisconsin. The locations of National Register properties for which the latitude and longitude coordinates are included below may be seen in a map.

There are 29 properties and districts listed on the National Register in the county.

This National Park Service list is complete through NPS recent listings posted August 28, 2026.

== Current listings ==
	Name on the Register	Image	Date listed	Location	City or town	Description
1	Astor Fur Warehouse	Astor Fur Warehouse	October 15, 1966 (#66000800)	Water Street, Saint Feriole Island; 43°03′18″N 91°09′36″W	Prairie du Chien	Built by Joseph Rolette around 1828 for John Jacob Astor's American Fur Company, this is the only known fur trade warehouse left in the Upper Mississippi Valley.
2	Blackhawk Avenue Historic District	Blackhawk Avenue Historic District	September 22, 2025 (#100012253)	100-225 W Blackhawk Ave, 101-130 E Blackhawk Ave, 201-213 E Blackhawk Ave (odd only) and 108 N Beaumont Rd; 43°03′06″N 91°08′47″W	Prairie du Chien	Fairly intact old business district, including remnants of the Northwest Fur Company Office built in the early 1800s, the 1842 Greek Revival-style Folsom house, the 1855 Federal-style Grelle building, the 1868 Friederich Harness Shop, the 1874 Garvey Brothers Dry Goods store, the 1881 Italianate-style Smrcina's Hall, the 1881 Italianate Commercial Hotel, the 1894 Italianate City Hall, the 1900 Queen Anne-style Grelle Block, and the 1950 Streamline Moderne-style Panka Building/Metro Theatre.
3	Michael Brisbois House	Michael Brisbois House	October 15, 1966 (#66000801)	Water Street, Saint Feriole Island; 43°03′15″N 91°09′35″W	Prairie du Chien	Federal style house built of locally-quarried limestone around 1837 by fur trader Joseph Rolette for his estranged wife Jane.
4	Carved Cave	Carved Cave	September 27, 1996 (#96001026)	Address Restricted	Petersburg	Crevice in a sandstone outcrop in the Kickapoo Valley, in which early people carved over 100 grooves.
5	Cipra Wayside Mound Group	Cipra Wayside Mound Group	February 7, 2007 (#07000034)	Highway 60, 5 miles E of Bridgeport; 43°02′20″N 90°59′18″W	Wauzeka	Linear and conical burial mounds near the Wisconsin River, built by Late Woodland people.
6	Commercial Hotel	Commercial Hotel	November 15, 2002 (#02001342)	201 West Blackhawk Avenue; 43°03′06″N 91°08′52″W	Prairie du Chien	Built in 1866 as the Schweizer Block, this Italianate-styled building first housed retail, offices and storage. It later became the Commodore Hotel, the Commercial Hotel, and the Fort Crawford Hotel.
7	Crawford County Courthouse	Crawford County Courthouse	March 9, 1982 (#82000645)	220 North Beaumont Road; 43°03′17″N 91°08′44″W	Prairie du Chien	Italianate-styled courthouse built in 1867 of limestone quarried nearby in Bridgeport. The dungeon-like jail in the basement may have been built as early as 1843, one of the oldest remaining in the state.
8	Crow Hollow Site	Crow Hollow Site	March 13, 2002 (#02000256)	Address Restricted	Petersburg	Rare Middle Archaic campsite along the Kickapoo River, occupied as early as 5000 years ago, where archaeologists have found points, scrapers, grindstones, and refuse and storage pits.
9	Dousman Hotel	Dousman Hotel	October 15, 1966 (#66000122)	Fisher Street and River Road; 43°03′14″N 91°09′35″W	Prairie du Chien	Grand 3-story Victorian brick hotel near the river, built around 1864 by the Milwaukee and Mississippi Railroad and named for Hercules Dousman, fur agent cum railroad developer. In 1937 the building was gutted to become a slaughterhouse, but it's now restored.
10	Benjamin F. and Wilhelmina Fay House	Benjamin F. and Wilhelmina Fay House	August 6, 2019 (#100004227)	203 S. Wacouta Ave. 43°03′00″N 91°08′42″W	Prairie du Chien	2-story cream brick Italianate-styled house with polygonal bays, built in 1881. Benjamin was a storekeeper, livestock dealer, and then land agent.
11	Foley Mound Group	Foley Mound Group	July 15, 1974 (#74000062)	Address Restricted	Lynxville	
12	W.H.C. Folsom House	W.H.C. Folsom House	December 6, 1984 (#84000692)	109 Blackhawk Avenue; 43°03′06″N 91°08′49″W	Prairie du Chien	Greek Revival home built in 1842 for businessman Folsom. Attorney Wiram Knowlton recruited here during the Mexican–American War. John Muir worked here as a printer.
13	Fort Crawford Military Hospital	Fort Crawford Military Hospital	October 15, 1966 (#66000121)	Rice Street and South Beaumont Road; 43°02′37″N 91°08′49″W	Prairie du Chien	Started in 1816, Fort Crawford was one of a string of U.S. Army outposts in the Old Northwest. Here the First Treaty of Prairie du Chien was negotiated, Dr. Beaumont investigated human digestion, Zachary Taylor and Jefferson Davis served, and Black Hawk was imprisoned. Now a museum.
14	Larsen Cave	Larsen Cave	March 5, 2002 (#02000187)	Address Restricted	Eastman	
15	Old Rock School	Old Rock School	December 1, 1983 (#83004265)	South Marquette Road at Parrish Street; 43°02′01″N 91°08′12″W	Prairie du Chien	Elementary school constructed in 1857 in Greek Revival style.
16	Olson Mound Group	Olson Mound Group	February 12, 1974 (#74000063)	Address Restricted	Seneca	
17	Pedretti III	Pedretti III	December 18, 1978 (#78000084)	Address Restricted	Prairie du Chien	
18	Strange Powers House	Strange Powers House	August 27, 1979 (#79000067)	338 North Main Street; 43°03′19″N 91°08′54″W	Prairie du Chien	Part of the house is constructed in a French colonial technique of vertical timbers with horizontal poles mortised between, probably built around 1820. Strange Powers is the name of an early owner.
19	Prairie du Chien City Hall	Prairie du Chien City Hall	October 16, 2002 (#02001186)	207 West Blackhawk Avenue; 43°03′06″N 91°08′53″W	Prairie du Chien	1894 building which housed the mayor's office, police department, fire department, library, an auditorium, and later the American Legion.
20	Prairie du Chien Post Office	Prairie du Chien Post Office	October 24, 2000 (#00001263)	120 South Beaumont Road; 43°03′03″N 91°08′46″W	Prairie du Chien	Constructed with WPA help in 1936, including a relief sculpture of Marquette and Jolliet.
21	Alfred Reed Mound Group (47Cr311)	Alfred Reed Mound Group (47Cr311)	September 7, 1982 (#82000646)	Address Restricted	Prairie du Chien	
22	Rolette House	Rolette House	February 1, 1972 (#72000046)	Northeast corner of North Water and Fisher Streets; 43°03′14″N 91°09′33″W	Prairie du Chien	Frame-with-brick-nogging house begun in 1840 by fur trader Joseph Rolette. Later a hotel and boarding house.
23	St. Germain dit Gauthier House	St. Germain dit Gauthier House	May 10, 2018 (#100002411)	419 5th St. 43°03′22″N 91°09′17″W	Prairie du Chien	Early house built in 1837 by Guillaume St. Germain, who came from Quebec. Walls are of horizontal hewn logs with dovetailed corners, the French-Canadian piece sur piece a que d'aronde construction.
24	St. Mary's Academy and College	St. Mary's Academy and College	July 14, 2017 (#100001380)	604 S. Beaumont Rd. 43°02′40″N 91°08′50″W	Prairie du Chien	Italianate building begun in 1872 and added to until 1914. St. Mary's was an all-female Catholic school that operated from 1872 to 1929 when it moved to Milwaukee, becoming Mount Mary College. From 1929 to 1961 the building in Prairie du Chien housed a girls' prep school.
25	Tainter Cave	Tainter Cave	May 8, 2001 (#01000106)	Address Restricted	Clayton	Deep cave containing charcoal drawings of birds, men, deer and abstract designs, some dated around 1000 CE. The 100 drawings constitute half the known rock art drawings in the state, some in a distinct style.
26	Unpleasant Ridge	Unpleasant Ridge	December 15, 1997 (#97001553)	Address Restricted	Boydtown	
27	Francois Vertefeuille House	Francois Vertefeuille House	March 18, 1993 (#93000142)	Hwy. K, 0.35 mi. S of jct. with Limery Rd. 43°04′59″N 91°08′57″W	Prairie du Chien	Log cabin built around 1810 in a distinct French Canadian method by people connected to the fur trade. Believed the oldest structure in Wisconsin on its original site.
28	Villa Louis	Villa Louis	October 15, 1966 (#66000123)	Villa Road and Bolvin Street; 43°03′21″N 91°09′33″W	Prairie du Chien	1871 Italian villa style mansion built on an Indian mound by Louis Dousman, on the estate started by his father Hercules in 1843. Now a museum.
29	Wall-Smethurst Mound Group	Wall-Smethurst Mound Group	June 13, 1974 (#74000064)	Address Restricted	Lynxville	

== See also ==
- List of National Historic Landmarks in Wisconsin
- National Register of Historic Places listings in Wisconsin
- Listings in neighboring counties: Allamakee (IA), Clayton (IA), Grant, Richland, Vernon
