= Dousman =

Dousman can refer to:

== People ==
- Hercules L. Dousman, 19th century American trader and real estate investor; so of Michael Dousman and father of H. Louis Dousman
- H. Louis Dousman, son of Hercules L. Dousman
- Michael Dousman, father of Hercules L. Dousman and grandfather of H. Louis Dousman

== Places ==
United States

- Dousman, Wisconsin, a village in Waukesha County
- Dousman Hotel, a hotel in Prairie du Chien, Wisconsin named for Hercules L. Dousman
