= Villa Louis =

Historic house in Wisconsin, United States

- U.S. National Register of Historic Places
- U.S. National Historic Landmark
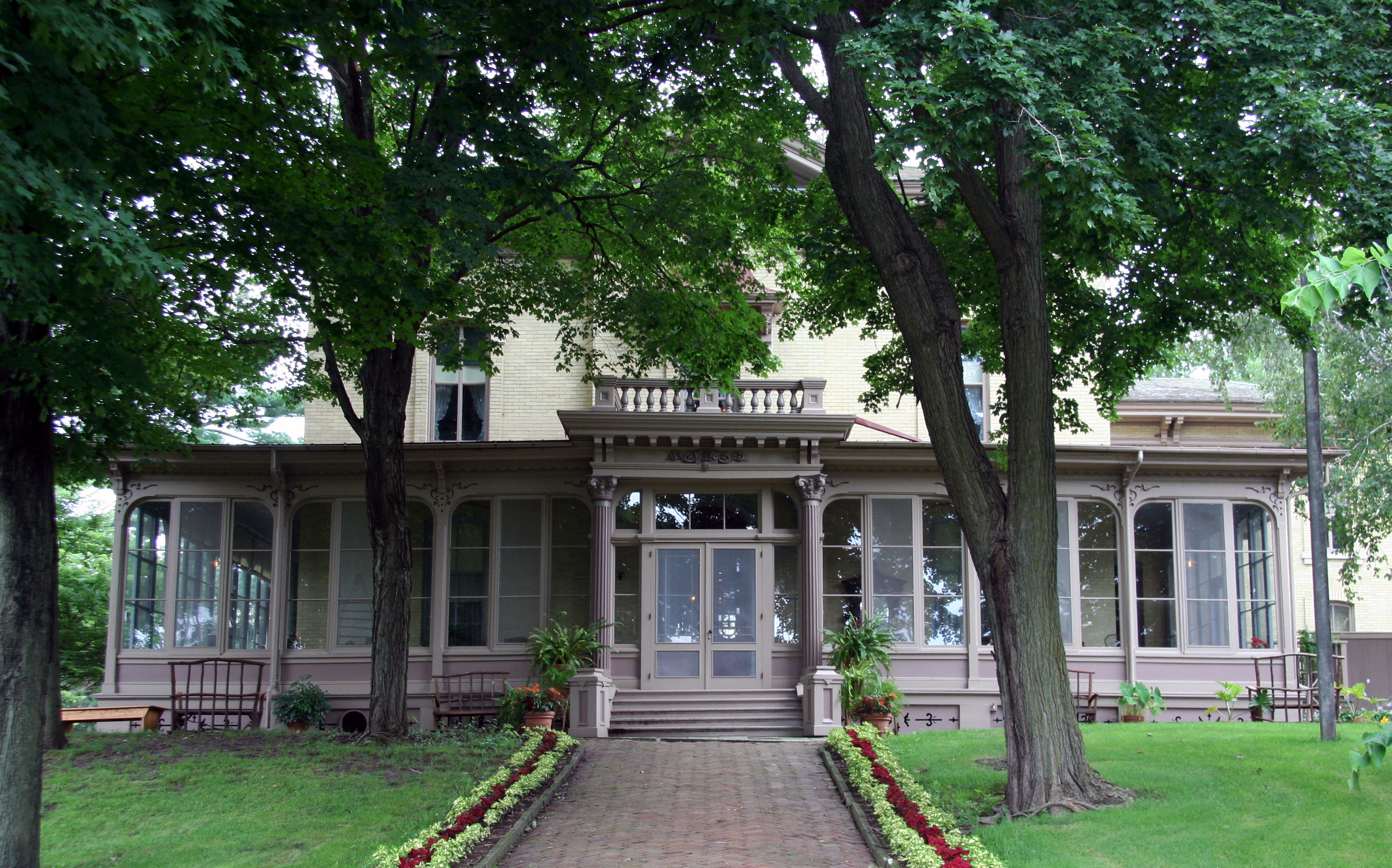
- Front facade of Villa Louis.

- Location within Wisconsin Location within the United States
- Location: Villa Road and Bolvin Street; Prairie du Chien, WI
- Coordinates: 43°3′21″N 91°9′33″W
- Area: 17 acres (6.9 ha)
- Built: (1843) 1871
- Architect: E. Townsend Mix
- Architectural style: Late Victorian Italianate
- NRHP reference No.: 66000123

Significant dates
- Added to NRHP: October 15, 1966
- Designated NHL: October 9, 1960

The Villa Louis is a National Historic Landmark located on St. Feriole Island, in Prairie du Chien, southwestern Wisconsin. The villa and estate are a historical museum operated by the Wisconsin Historical Society. The site has been restored to its appearance during the late 19th century, when it was the estate of the prominent H. Louis Dousman family, descendants of a fur trader and entrepreneur.

== History ==
The site was inhabited by Native American tribes, especially the Mound Builders, as is evidenced by the large mound upon which later structures at the site (Fort Shelby, Fort Crawford, and the homes of Hercules and of Louis Dousman) have all stood. In 1814, the Siege of Prairie du Chien was fought in the area by American and British troops hoping to control Fort Shelby during the War of 1812. Later the land was occupied by Fort Crawford.

After white settlers drove Indigenous communities from their homelands, the land was purchased by Hercules L. Dousman, who was a man of many trades: a fur trader, a lumberman, a land sculptor, and a frontier entrepreneur. In the mid-1840s, he began construction on the estate from which Villa Louis would be born. The location he chose was perfect due to its proximity to the Mississippi River.

Later Dousman's son, Louis, established the present estate, at the center of which is an elegant Villa Louis mansion designed by E. Townsend Mix built in 1871 in the Victorian Italianate style.

=== 19th century ===
The estate now known as Villa Louis began when Prairie du Chien trader and investor Hercules Dousman purchased land previously occupied by Fort Crawford. Dousman had the remains of the fort cleared away. In 1843, he built a large, brick Greek Revival house atop an Indian mound, which had been the site of the old fort's southeastern blockhouse. Because of this, Hercules Dousman's home has come to be called the "House on the Mound". This name was also used as the title of an August Derleth novel that featured Dousman as a principal character. Hercules Dousman lived in the House on the Mound until his death in 1868. At the time of his death, he was one of the wealthiest men in Wisconsin, and his fortune passed to his wife Jane and his son Louis.

Upon coming into his father's estate, Louis decided to demolish the House on the Mound and replace it with a more contemporary Victorian Italianate style house that included modern indoor plumbing and central heating, both considered luxuries at the time. Louis Dousman contracted with Milwaukee architect E. Townsend Mix in 1870 to have the new house designed and built, and construction was finished in 1871. The new mansion was built with some parts of the old demolished one. The two-story Cream City brick house became the residence of Louis's mother, Jane, while Louis himself moved to Saint Paul, Minnesota not long after construction was finished.

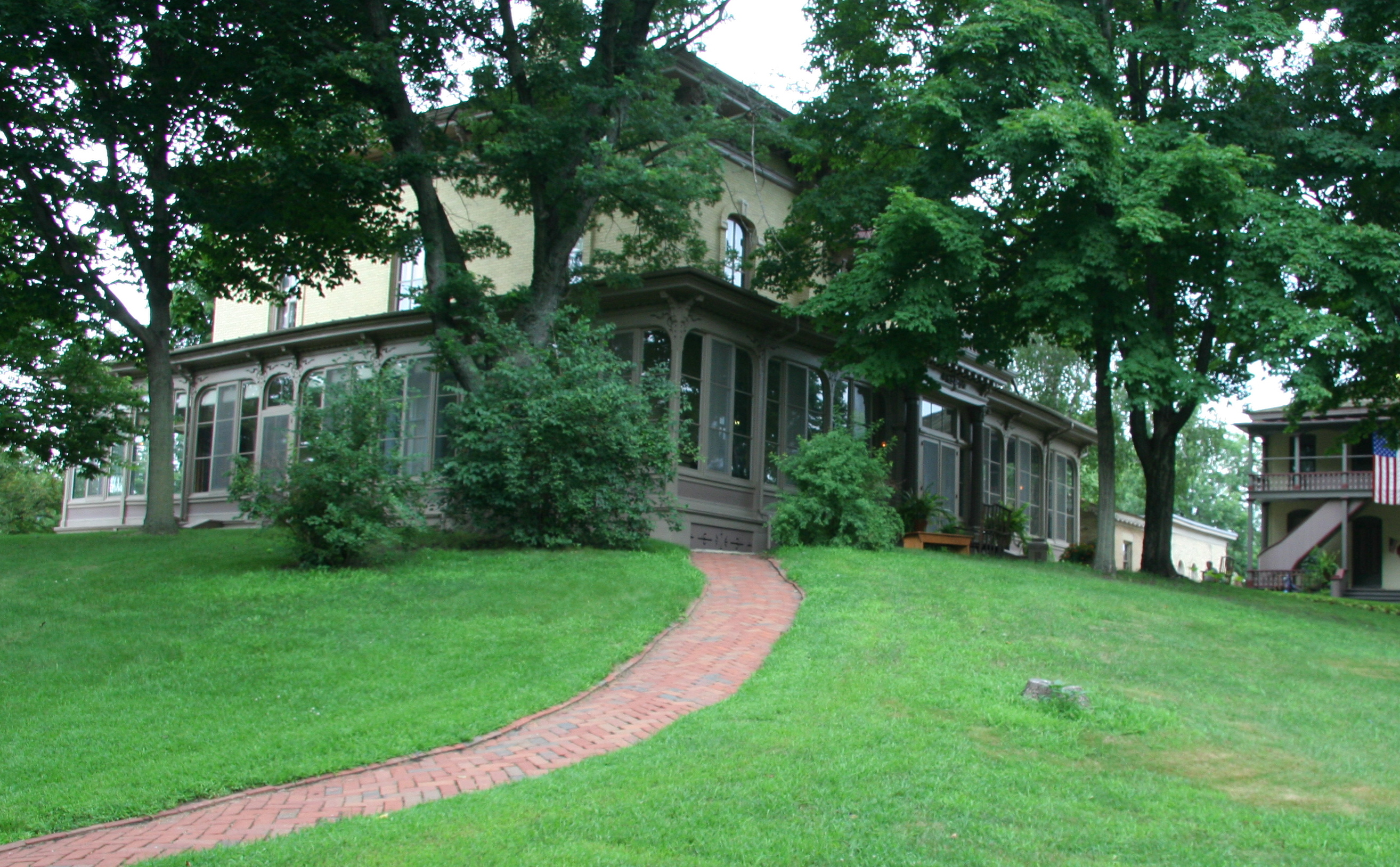
The Villa Louis Estate

In St. Paul, Louis married Nina Sturgis, and later the couple moved to St. Louis, Missouri, eventually having five children. However, following the death of his mother Jane Dousman in 1882, Louis made plans to return to Prairie du Chien and transform the family estate into a stock farm to breed Standardbred horses. Stables and paddocks were constructed on the estate, along with a half mile racetrack so Dousman could begin holding an annual carriage race on the property. Because the estate had an artesian well, Louis decided to call his new venture the "Artesian Stock Farm". In 1885, Louis moved back to the Prairie du Chien estate with his family. In the process, the 1871 mansion was substantially remodeled and the house was redecorated in the style of the British Arts and Crafts Movement. This remodel included not only the house, but also the adjacent office. The remodeling was done by a Chicago designer from the William Morris Company of London.

Louis's plans for the estate came to an abrupt halt the following year, on his sudden death in January, 1886. He was 37 years old when he died, leaving behind a widow and five children. After Louis's death, the stock farm was disbanded and the horses sold, and Nina Dousman renamed the estate "Villa Louis" in memory of her late husband. Later, in 1888, Nina remarried and moved to New York City, leaving the estate vacant. Her new marriage did not last, and in 1893 she returned with the five Dousman children to the Midwest. Villa Louis was then used as the family's summer home into the early 20th century. Louis de Vierville Dousman, the only son of Louis and Nina, was the last family member to occupy the estate, leaving for Billings, Montana in 1913 with his wife Sarah Easton.

=== 20th century ===
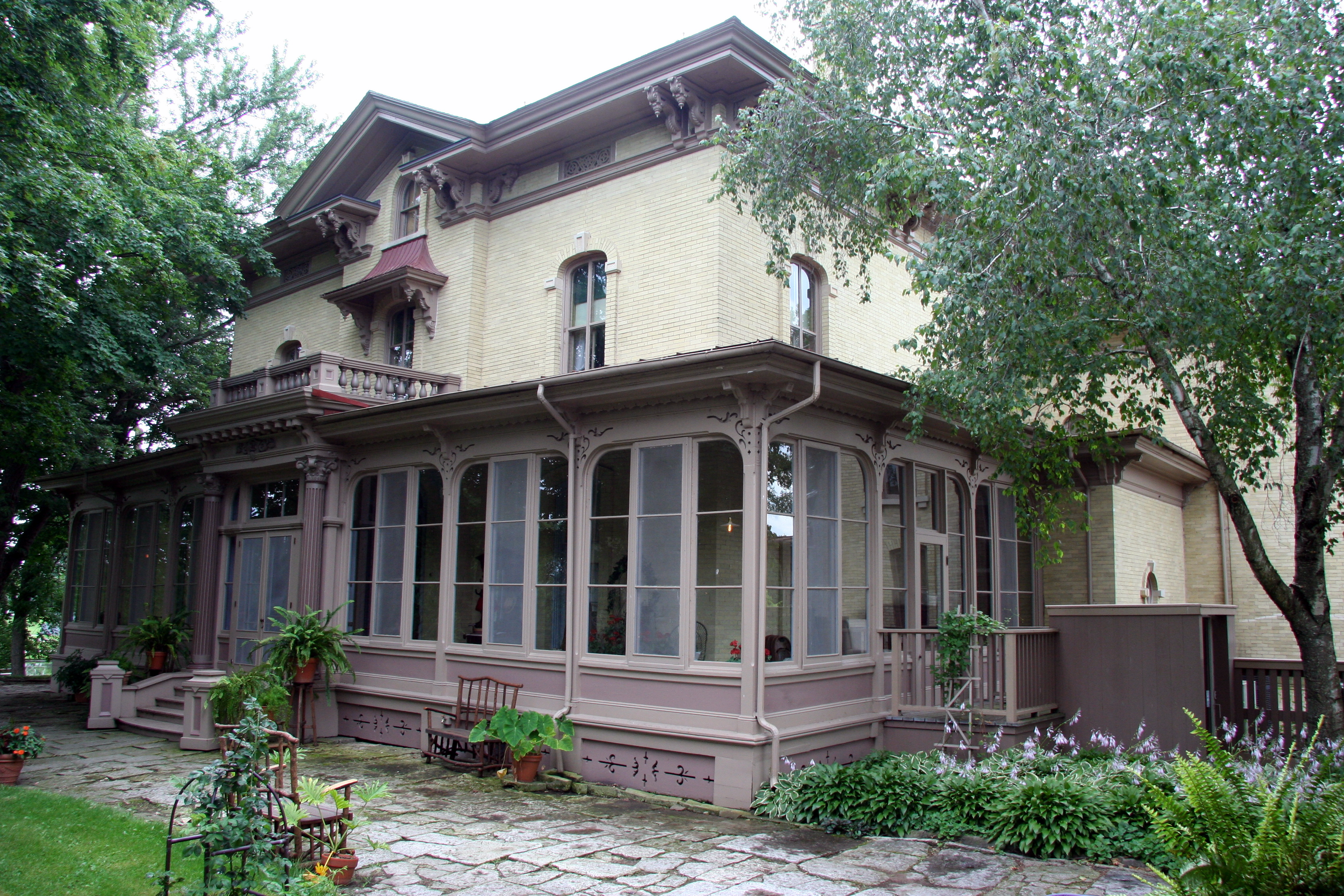
The west side of the mansion

==== Historic site and museums ====
Although the Dousman family had left the Villa Louis estate by 1913, they continued to own the property. Over the following decades, they rented the mansion for use as a boarding school, among other things. In the 1930s, two of Louis Dousman's children, Violet and Virginia, began to restore the estate to its 19th-century appearance. They then transferred the property to the city of Prairie du Chien, so that the mansion could be operated as a historic house museum. In 1952, the site was acquired by the Wisconsin Historical Society, and became the organization's first historic site.

Since then, the Villa Louis historic site has expanded to encompass two other nearby National Historic Landmarks: the Brisbois House, and the Astor Fur Warehouse. The warehouse now functions as a museum of the fur trade, while the Brisbois house has remained closed to the public. The site also contains the Rolette House, which is listed on the National Register of Historic Places, and numerous outbuildings constructed by the Dousmans as part of the Villa Louis estate.

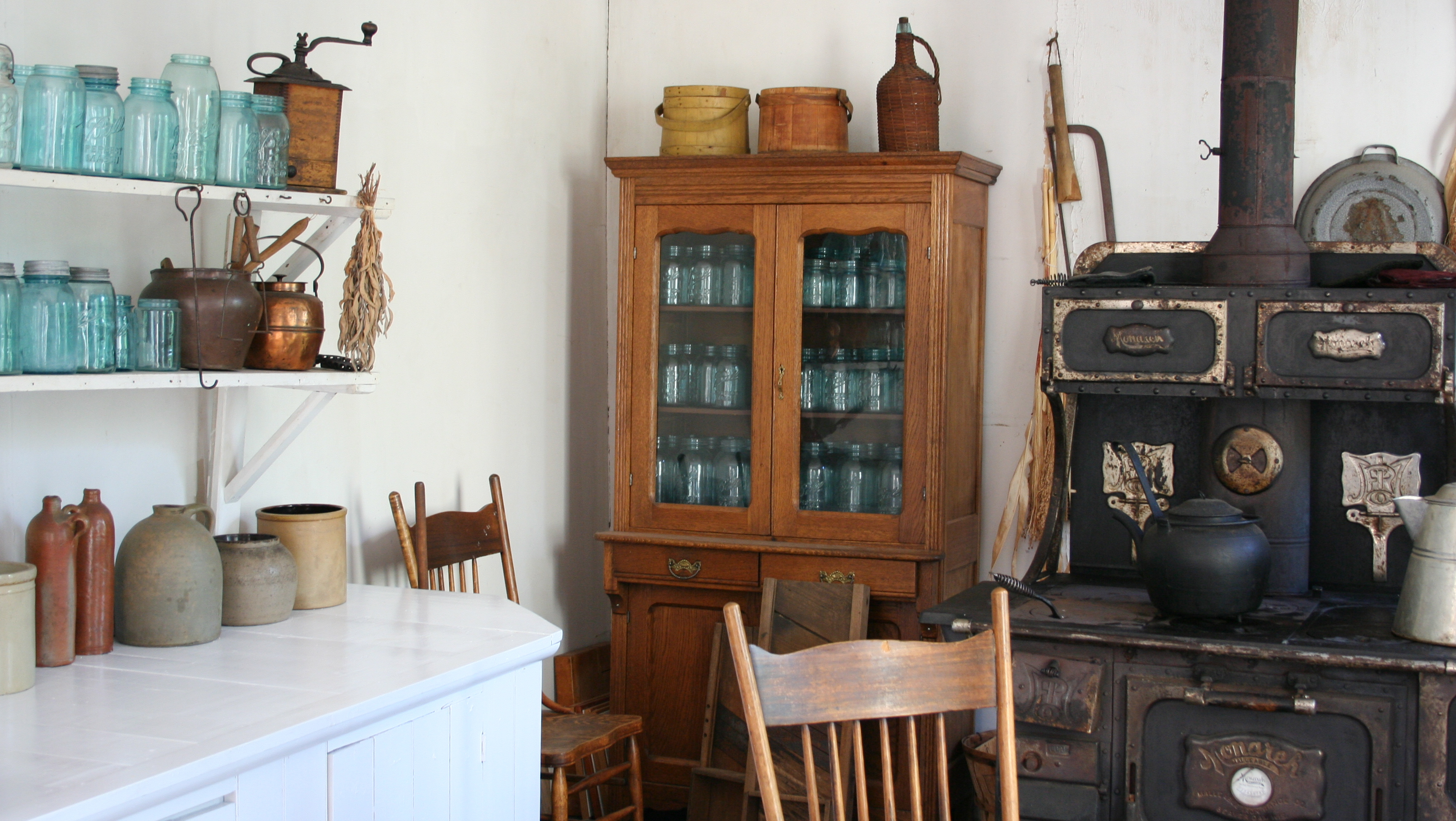
A kitchen in a building near the mansion

==== 1990s restoration ====
In the 1990s, the discovery of numerous photographs of Villa Louis from the late 19th century allowed the historical society to undertake a major restoration of the mansion and surrounding buildings. Using the collection of photographs and the estate's original furnishings, many of which were given to the site by the Dousman family heirs, the society was able to authentically restore the home to its appearance from 1893 to 1898. The use of photographs and original furniture to so accurately restore the home brought national attention to the site in 1999, including a feature article in Victorian Decorating & Lifestyle magazine and an exhibit at the New York School of Interior Design.

The historical society hosts several events at Villa Louis, including a reenactment of the Battle of Prairie du Chien, and the Villa Louis Carriage Classic, a major carriage driving competition held each September.

== See also ==
- Dousman Hotel
- Bernard Walter Brisbois
- List of National Historic Landmarks in Wisconsin
- National Register of Historic Places listings in Crawford County, Wisconsin
