= KPDC =

KPDC may refer to:

- Prairie du Chien Municipal Airport (ICAO code KPDC)
- KPDC-LP, a defunct low-power television station (channel 25) formerly licensed to Indio, California, United States
