= Crow Hollow Site =

- U.S. National Register of Historic Places
- Location: Haney, Wisconsin
- Area: less than one acre
- NRHP reference No.: 02000256
- Added to NRHP: March 13, 2002

The Crow Hollow Site is located in Haney, Wisconsin, USA.

== Description ==
The site is a rare Middle Archaic campsite along the Kickapoo River, occupied as early as 5,000 years ago, where archaeologists have found points, scrapers, grindstones and refuse and storage pits. It was added to the State and the National Register of Historic Places in 2002.
