= Old Rock School (Prairie du Chien, Wisconsin) =

- U.S. National Register of Historic Places
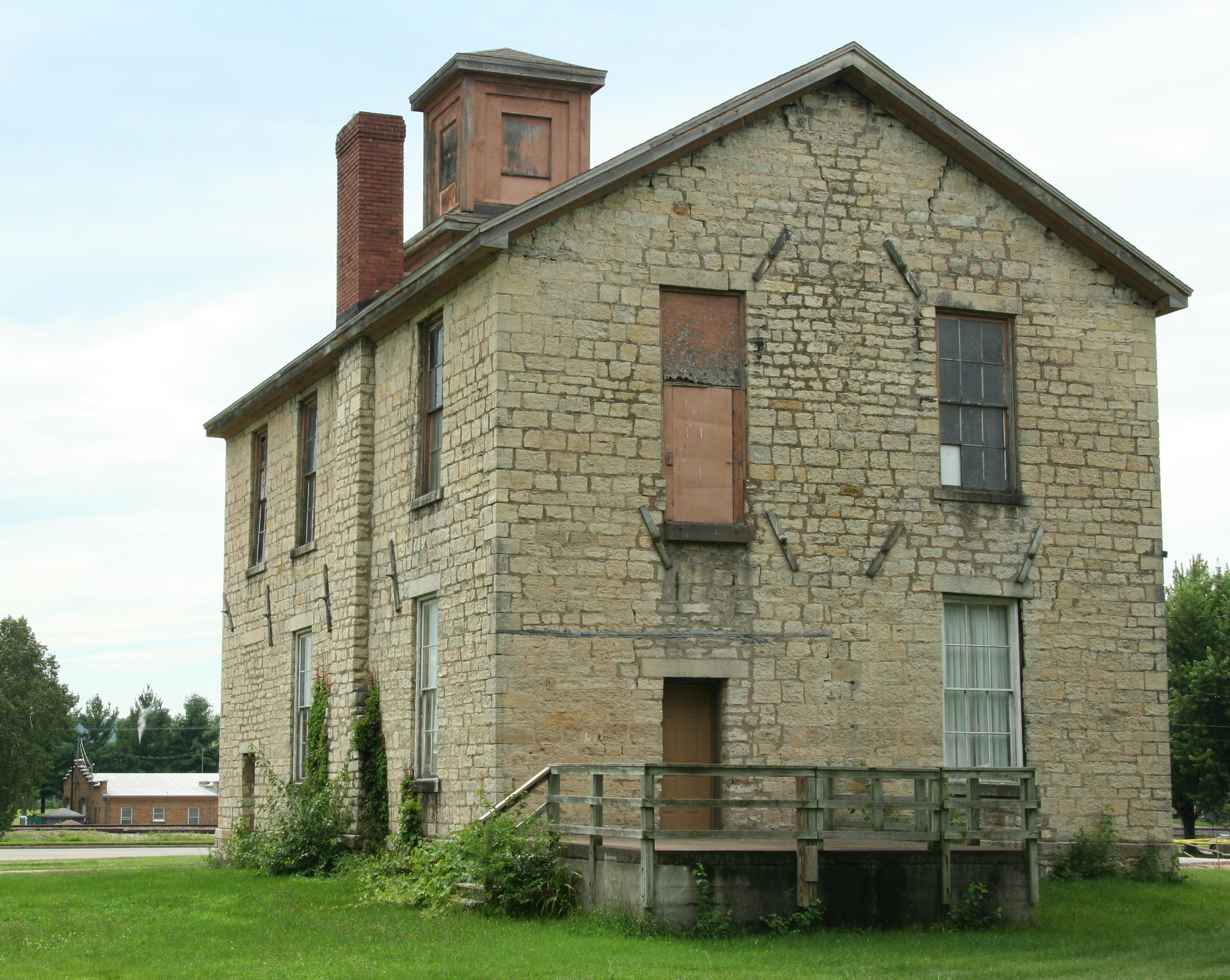
- Old Rock School

- Location within Wisconsin Location within the United States
- Location: U.S. Highway 18 and Parrish St., Prairie du Chien, Wisconsin
- Coordinates: 43.03492°N 91.1368°W
- Built: 1857
- Built by: Ashbel Gates
- Architectural style: Greek Revival
- NRHP reference No.: 83004265
- Added to NRHP: December 1, 1983

The Old Rock School is a historic school building on the east side of U.S. Highway 18 at Parrish Street in Prairie du Chien, Wisconsin. It was added to the National Register of Historic Places in 1983.

== History ==
Prairie du Chien opened its first public school in 1846, though private schools operated as far back as the 1810s. The town built the Old Rock School in 1858 after outgrowing its original schoolhouse, as its population grew rapidly in the 1850s. The two-and-a-half story stone building cost nearly $4,000 and was funded through a special tax approved by the Wisconsin Legislature, as state law at the time only allowed school districts to raise $300 in taxes. The building had a Greek Revival design with a Palladian window on the attic level, a wooden canopy over the entrance, and a cupola atop the gable roof. The school operated until 1926; the building went on to serve as a community center and meeting area for local groups. In the 1980s, a memorial was added to the site to honor local soldiers who served in wars from the Black Hawk War to World War II.
