= John Drew (trader) =

American politician

John Alexander Drew was a prominent American trader in the Mackinac area in the early 19th century; it is now considered within the boundaries of Michigan. He also was a politician, serving in the Michigan House of Representatives for the 1841 session.

== Biography ==
John Alexander Drew was born in 1777 in England.

John A. Drew was trading the Lake Superior area from 1802 to 1817. Early in his career, Drew was an agent under Michael Dousman, trading with the local Ojibwe and Odaawaa. Later, together with Edward Biddle, Drew was part owner of Biddle & Drew.

He worked as the Sheriff of Mackinac in 1834.

In the 1836 Treaty of Washington, with the Ottawa, etc. (7 Stat. 491), Drew was granted a tract of one section and three quarters, to his Indian family, at Cheboygan rapids, at the rate of four dollars.

Later in his career, he served in the Michigan House of Representatives for Mackinac County in the 1841 session.

Like many fur traders who lived in the country among the tribes, John Drew had liaisons with Native American women. In Leech Lake he had a daughter, Mary Elizabeth Drew (b. 1806; d. 2 June 1888, in Michigan), with an Ojibwe woman whose name is not recorded. Mary Elizabeth married Joseph LeCuyer [or Lecuryer] (b. unknown; d. 1857, in Door County, Wisc.) in Mackinac County in 1820. Joseph LeCuyer worked for John Drew after the trader set up a partnership known as Aiken and Drew. Joseph LeCuyer was later appointed a lighthouse keeper at the Pottawatomie Light House on Rock Island from 1855 to 1857, where he died while on duty.

While living in Sault Sainte Marie, Michigan, John Drew had a relationship with Marie Saugeuaqua, an Ojibwe neighbor. They had a daughter, Polly Drew (b. December 13, 1817-d. Feb 11. 1897). Saugeuaqua had been married to John Baptiste Cadotte II, a fur trader in the same village.

John Drew married Margaret Lasley on May 27, 1822, in the Mackinac area. Their children were:

- Mary Elizabeth Drew, born 1812 in Mackinac Island, Michigan. Married Joseph Lequea Lecuyer in 1820. Mary Lecuyer (née Drew) died in Michigan in 1888.
- William T. Drew, born c. 1825.
- Matilda Drew, born c. 1829, in Mackinac County, Michigan; d. Matilda Irvine (née Drew), 05 Dec 1909, in Detroit, MI.
- George A. Drew, born 15 Mar 1831, in Mackinac County, Michigan; d. 21 Jul 1921, in Highland Park, IL.
- Oliver Drew, born c. 1834.
- Julia Ann Drew, born c. 1843; d. Julia A. Drew, 12 Jul 1906, in Detroit, MI.
- Margaret Harriet Drew, born c. 1847.

John Alexander Drew died on November 15, 1846, in Mackinac County, Michigan. His obituary read: "At Mackinaw, on the 15th, instant, JOHN A. DREW, Esq., of the firm Biddle & Drew, aged 69 years." as published on November 30, 1846, in the Buffalo Commercial (Buffalo, NY). His estate went into probate in early December 1846, with his eldest son, William T. Drew, serving as a co-administer of the estate.
