= Barnum, Wisconsin =

- Unincorporated community
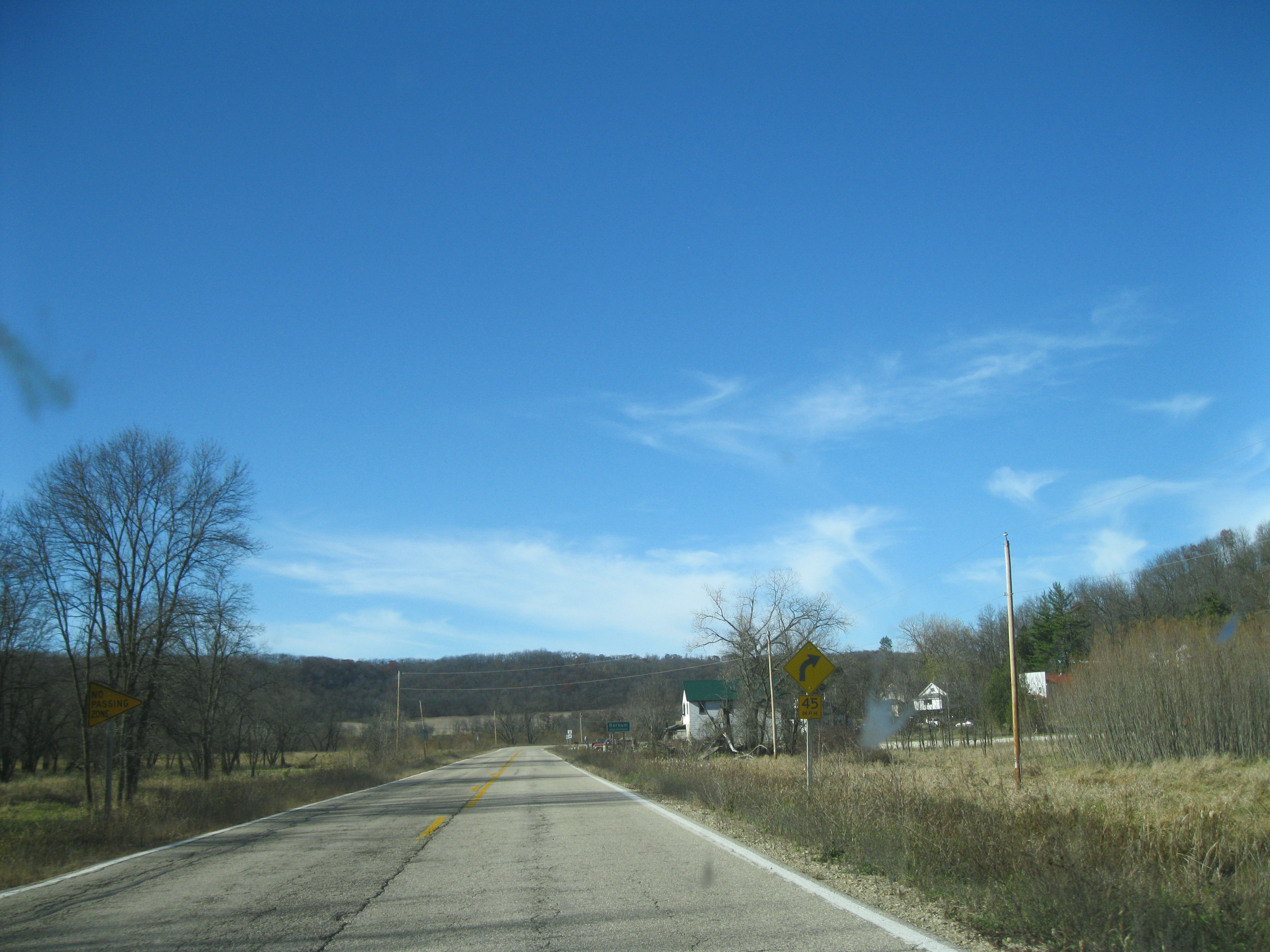
- Entering Barnum from the south on WIS 131

- Location within Wisconsin Location within the United States
- Coordinates: 43.2189°N 90.8396°W
- Country: United States
- State: Wisconsin
- County: Crawford
- Town: Haney
- Elevation: 705 ft (215 m)
- Time zone: UTC-6 (Central (CST))
  - Summer (DST): UTC-5 (CDT)
- Area code: 608
- GNIS feature ID: 1561188

Barnum is an unincorporated community located in the town of Haney, in Crawford County, Wisconsin, United States. Barnum is on the Kickapoo River north of Steuben and is served by Wisconsin Highway 131. Settlers started to make claims and settle the area shortly after Wisconsin became a state in 1848. The community was founded circa 1892 by Edward S. Barnum from Bristol, Ontario County, New York, who purchased land along the Kickapoo River in 1857.
