= Dousman Hotel =

- U.S. National Register of Historic Places
- U.S. National Historic Landmark
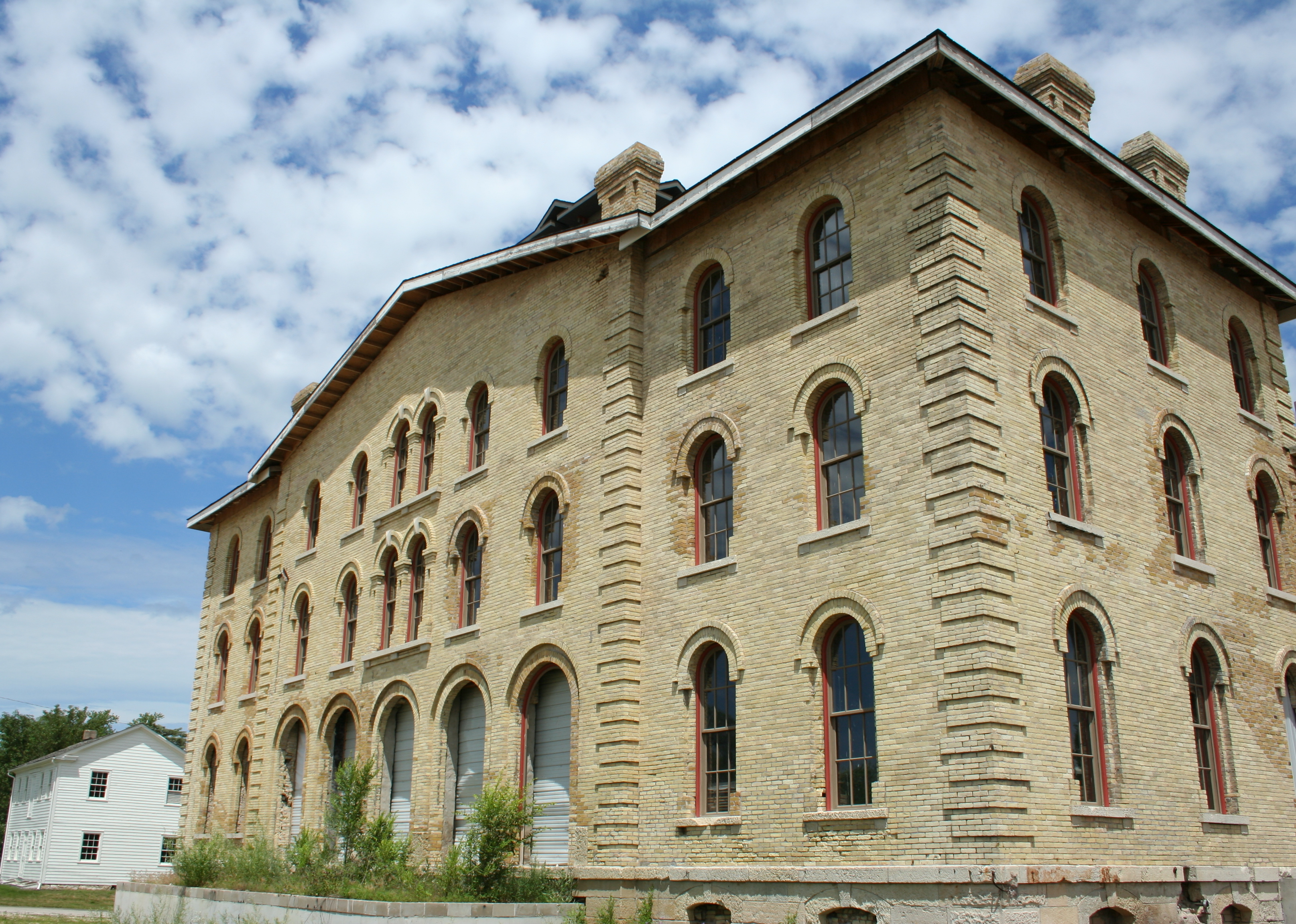

- Location within Wisconsin
- Location: Fisher St. and River Rd., Prairie du Chien, Wisconsin
- Coordinates: 43°3′14″N 91°9′35″W
- Built: 1864
- Architectural style: Mid-Victorian
- NRHP reference No.: 66000122

Significant dates
- Added to NRHP: October 15, 1966
- Designated NHL: October 9, 1960

The Dousman Hotel, is a historic hotel located at the intersection of Fisher Street and River Road in Prairie du Chien, Wisconsin. The hotel was built in 1864–65 to serve railroad and steamboat travelers coming to the city. The hotel was named after Hercules L. Dousman, an early Wisconsin fur trader, land speculator and millionaire.

The hotel operated until the 1920s; it was later converted to a meatpacking plant. It was declared a National Historic Landmark in 1960 for its significance as one of the last grand hotels to survive from the 19th century railroad and steamboat era. In the early 21st century, it was undergoing restoration. Its ground floor has opened as a restaurant and event venue known as the Dousman House.

== Description ==
The Dousman Hotel is a three-story brick building with a Mid-Victorian design. Due to additions and neglect, many of the building's decorative features are no longer intact. The brick quoins at the corners and arched moldings around the windows are the most prominent remaining elements of the original design. The hotel once had a square cupola and a bracketed cornice; both have been removed, though the cupola was eventually replaced. The building's original front porch, which ran along the center block of the front facade, is also gone. The hotel's original interior included fifty-one guest rooms and a dining room, though these were later gutted.

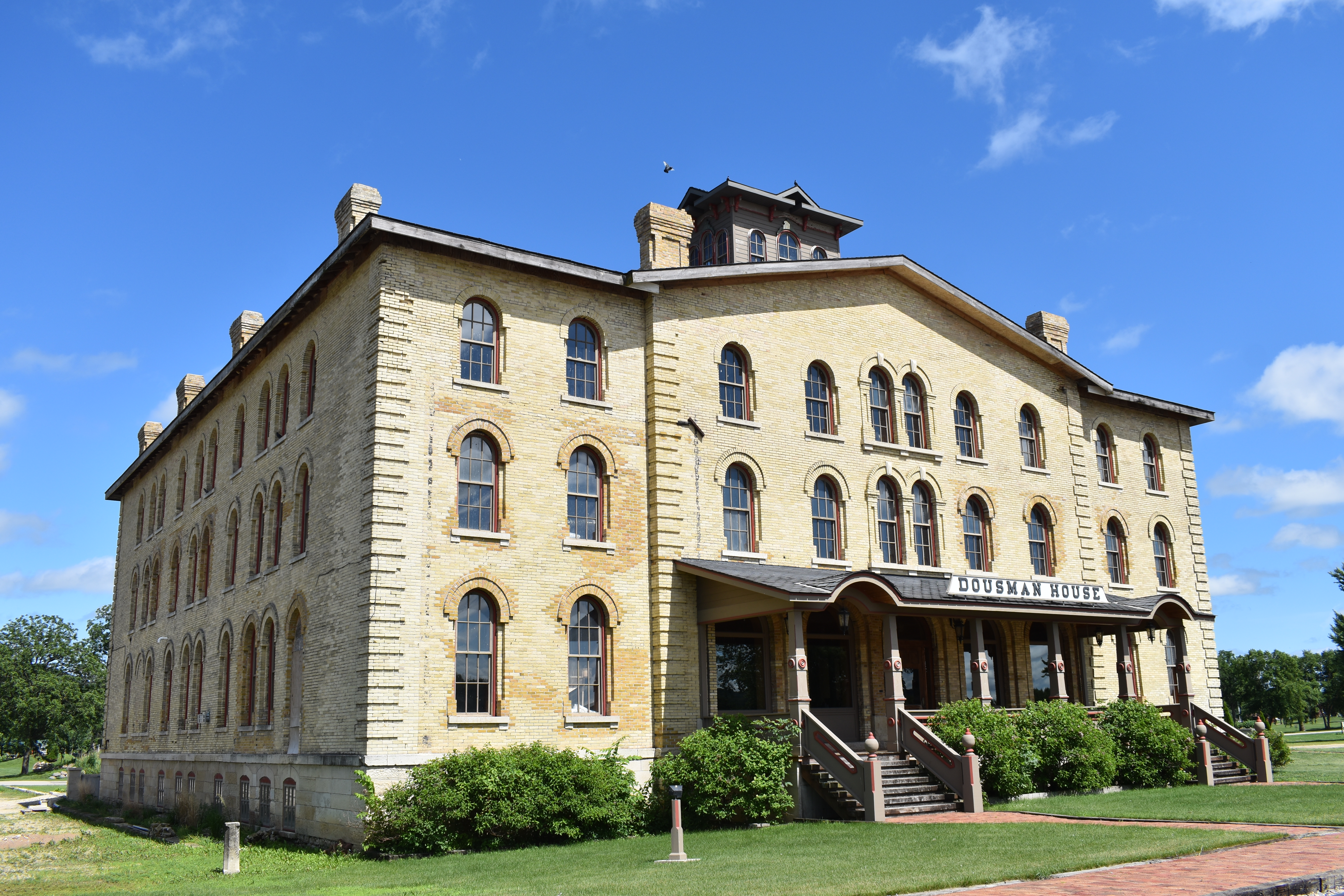
Dousman Hotel in 2025

== History ==
The Milwaukee and Mississippi Railroad built the Dousman Hotel next to its train depot in 1864–65. The hotel was named for fur trader Hercules L. Dousman, who had interests in both the steamboat and railroad industries, as well as lumber and real estate. At the time he was regarded as Prairie du Chien's most prominent resident and became a millionaire before his death, when there were few in the United States.

Travelers on both the river and the railroad frequented the hotel, which was considered the most luxurious of the city's hotels at the time. The hotel's proximity to the Milwaukee and Mississippi station made it a convenient choice for rail travelers. The hotel was a financial success and remained in operation through 1925.

After its closure, meatpacking plants occupied the hotel from 1939 to 1952; during this time, several additions were placed on the hotel, and its original interior was destroyed. The hotel was used for storage by other businesses after 1952, but by the 1960s it had been abandoned and became derelict. The building has since been restored, and an event center now operates in this space.

== See also ==
- List of National Historic Landmarks in Wisconsin
- National Register of Historic Places listings in Crawford County, Wisconsin
