= Prairie du Chien City Hall =

- U.S. National Register of Historic Places
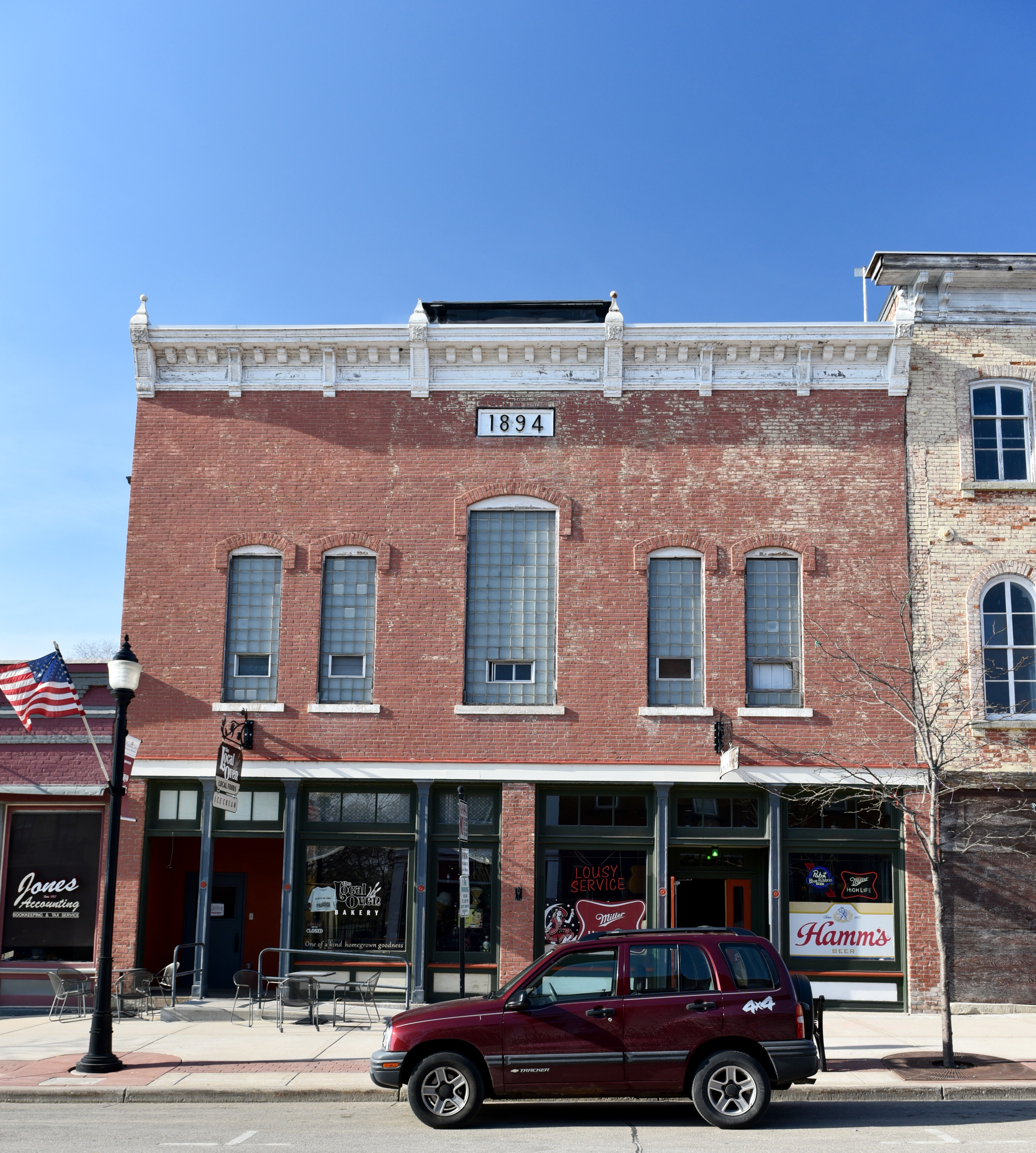

- Location within Wisconsin Location within the United States
- Interactive map showing the location of Prairie du Chien City Hall
- Location: 207 W. Blackhawk Ave., Prairie du Chien, Wisconsin
- Coordinates: 43°3′6″N 91°8′53″W
- Area: less than one acre
- Built: 1894
- Architectural style: Late Victorian
- NRHP reference No.: 02001186
- Added to NRHP: October 16, 2002

The Prairie du Chien City Hall is the city of Prairie du Chien, Wisconsin's historic former city hall. It was built in 1894 on the grounds of the city's former opera house, which burned down the previous year. In addition to being the center of city government, the building held a civic auditorium, Prairie du Chien's first public library, a jail, and the city's police and fire departments. From 1929 to the 1950s, the American Legion held meetings and events there as well. In 2002–03, the city government moved to a new city hall.

The city hall was added to the National Register of Historic Places on October 16, 2002.
