= Haney, Wisconsin =

- Town
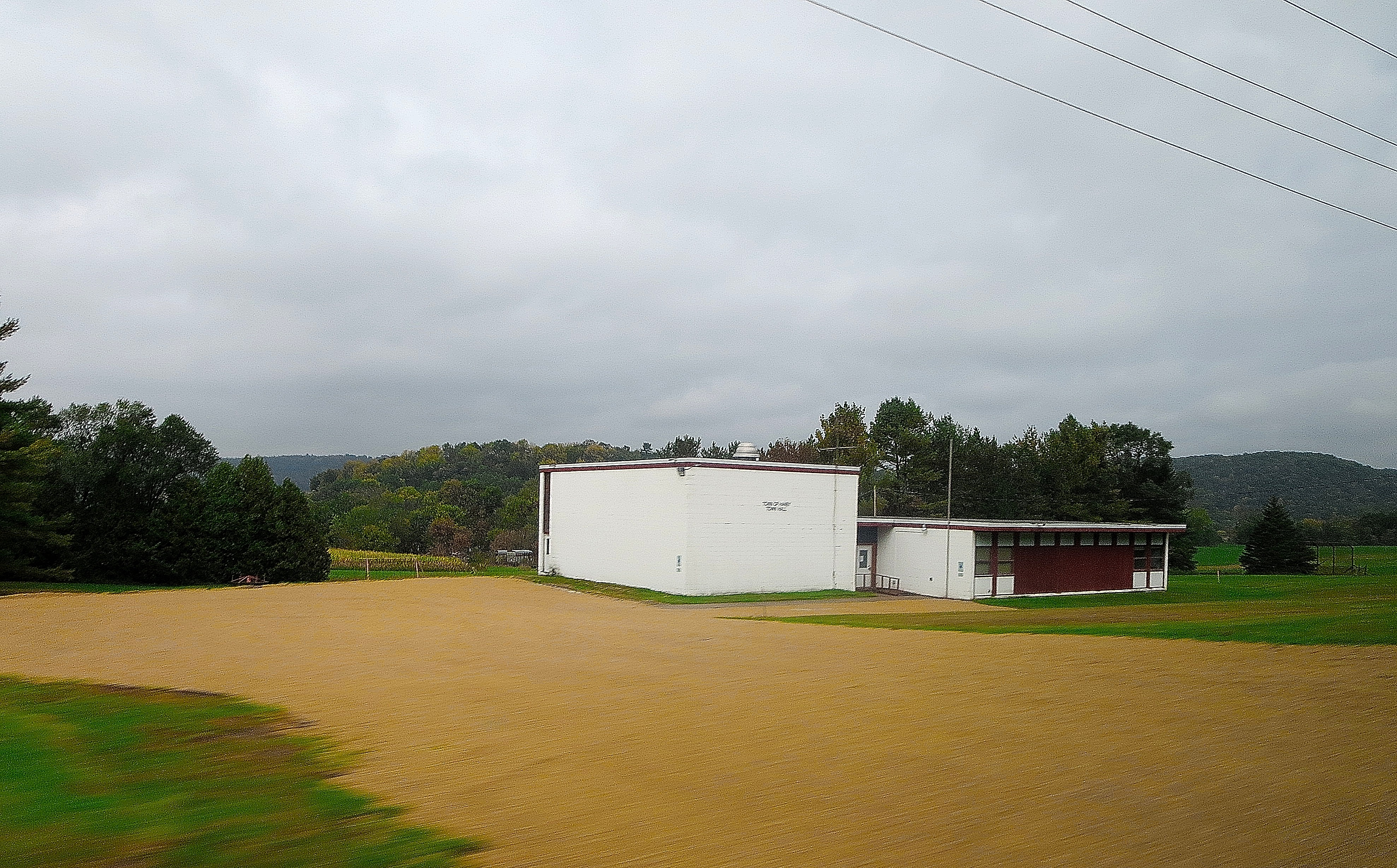
- Town hall

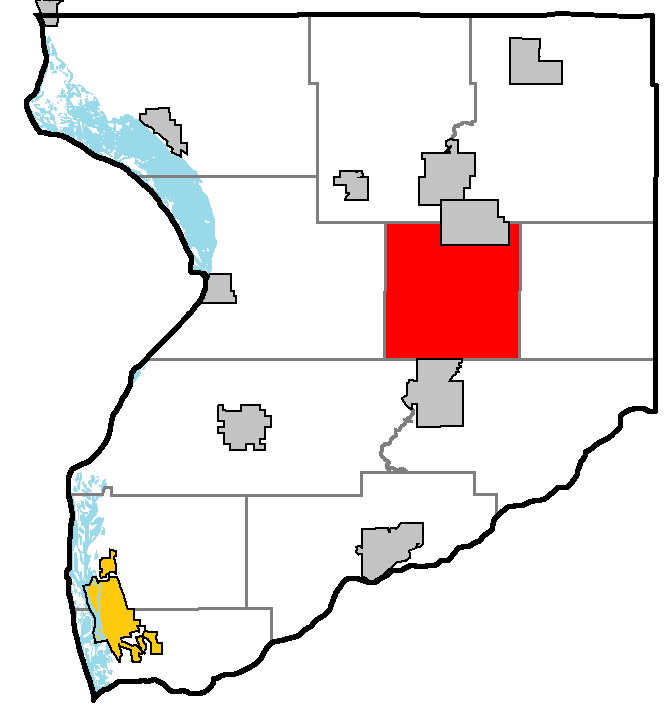
- Location of Haney, within Crawford County, Wisconsin

- Location of Crawford County, Wisconsin
- Coordinates: 43°15′5″N 90°50′16″W
- Country: United States
- State: Wisconsin
- County: Crawford

Area
  - Total: 32.7 sq mi (84.7 km^{2})
  - Land: 32.7 sq mi (84.6 km^{2})
  - Water: 0 sq mi (0.0 km^{2})
- Elevation: 728 ft (222 m)

Population (2020)
  - Total: 317
  - Density: 9.70/sq mi (3.75/km^{2})
- Time zone: UTC-6 (Central (CST))
  - Summer (DST): UTC-5 (CDT)
- Area code: 608
- FIPS code: 55-32500
- GNIS feature ID: 1583347
- Website: https://townofhaney.com/

Haney is a town in Crawford County, Wisconsin, United States. The population was 317 at the 2020 census. The unincorporated communities of Barnum and Petersburg are located within the town.

== History ==
The town was named for John Haney, the first person to settle in the town in the mid-1840s.

== Geography ==
According to the United States Census Bureau, the town has a total area of 32.7 square miles (84.7 km^{2}), of which 32.7 square miles (84.6 km^{2}) is land and 0.03% is water.

== Demographics ==
As of the census of 2000, there were 309 people, 129 households, and 89 families residing in the town. The population density was 10.1 people per square mile (3.9/km^{2}). There were 172 housing units at an average density of 5.3 per square mile (2.0/km^{2}). The racial makeup of the town was 99.70% White and 0.30% Asian.

There were 129 households, out of which 28.7% had children under the age of 18 living with them, 62.0% were married couples living together, 3.9% had a female householder with no husband present, and 31.0% were non-families. 26.4% of all households were made up of individuals, and 10.9% had someone living alone who was 65 years of age or older. The average household size was 2.56 and the average family size was 3.12.

In the town, the population was spread out, with 25.5% under the age of 18, 6.7% from 18 to 24, 21.5% from 25 to 44, 32.1% from 45 to 64, and 14.2% who were 65 years of age or older. The median age was 42 years. For every 100 females, there were 126.0 males. For every 100 females age 18 and over, there were 119.6 males.

The median income for a household in the town was $29,306, and the median income for a family was $32,500. Males had a median income of $21,154 versus $20,417 for females. The per capita income for the town was $14,877. About 7.5% of families and 14.1% of the population were below the poverty line, including 20.9% of those under age 18 and 13.8% of those age 65 or over.

== Notable people ==
- Thomas Curley, Wisconsin State Representative and farmer, lived in the town; Curley served on the Haney Town Board
