= Petersburg, Wisconsin =

- Unincorporated community
- Location within Wisconsin Location within the United States
- Coordinates: 43.2722°N 90.8376°W
- Country: United States
- State: Wisconsin
- County: Crawford
- Town: Haney
- Elevation: 702 ft (214 m)
- Time zone: UTC-6 (Central (CST))
  - Summer (DST): UTC-5 (CDT)
- Area code: 608
- GNIS feature ID: 1571265

Petersburg is an unincorporated community in the town of Haney in Crawford County, Wisconsin, United States. Petersburg is on the Kickapoo River south of Bell Center and is served by Wisconsin Highway 131.
