= Prairie du Chien Municipal Airport =

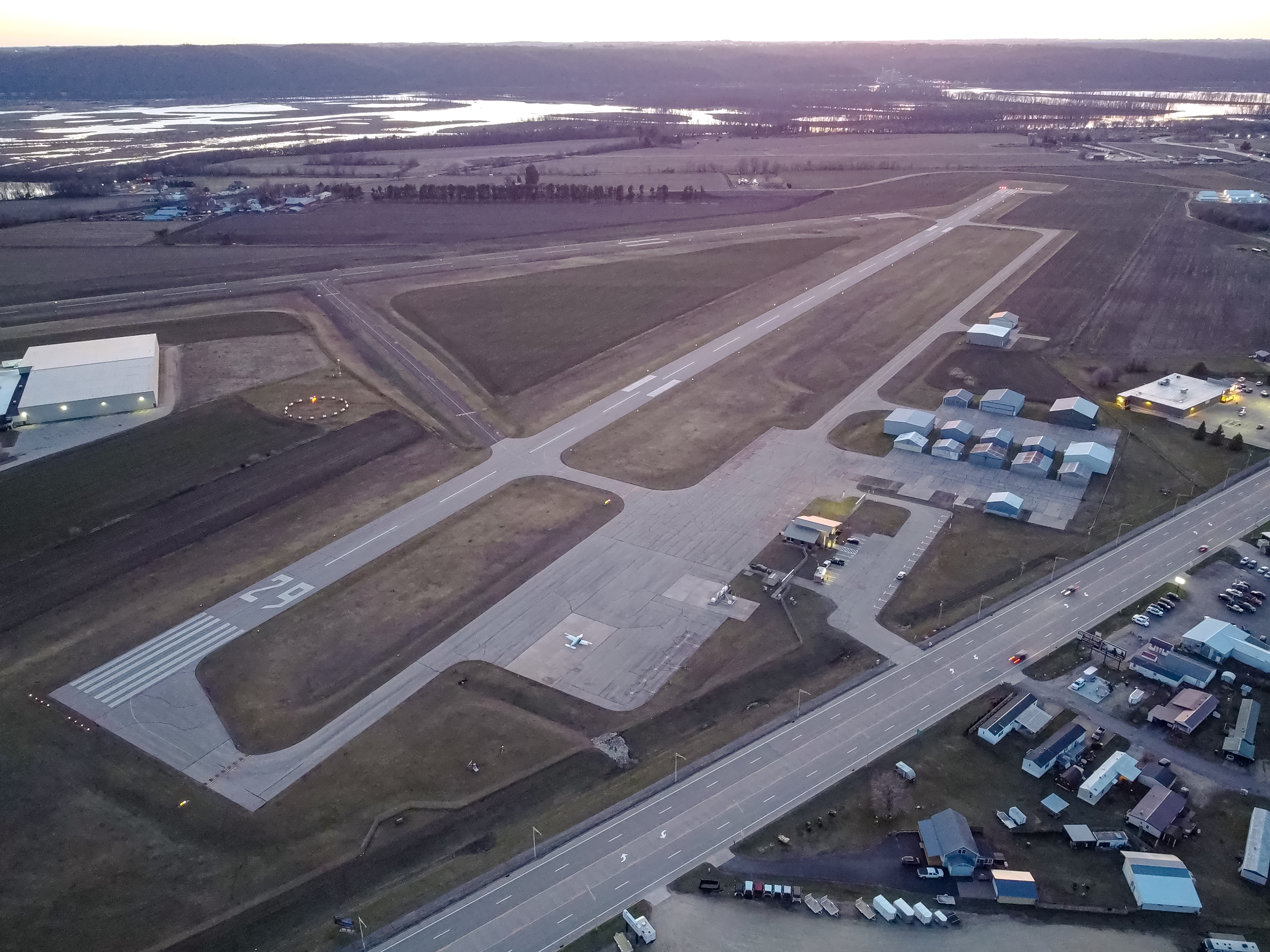
- IATA: PCD; ICAO: KPDC; FAA LID: PDC

Summary
- Airport type: Public
- Owner/Operator: City of Prairie du Chien
- Serves: Prairie du Chien, Wisconsin
- Opened: September 1947
- Time zone: CST (UTC−06:00)
  - Summer (DST): CDT (UTC−05:00)
- Elevation AMSL: 660 ft / 201 m
- Coordinates: 43°01′09″N 091°07′25″W

Map
- Location of airport in Wisconsin PDC (the United States)

Runways
Direction	Length		Surface
Direction	ft	m	Surface
14/32	5,000	1,524	Asphalt
11/29	3,999	1,219	Asphalt

Statistics
- Aircraft operations (2022): 12,300
- Based aircraft (2024): 16
- Source: Federal Aviation Administration

Prairie du Chien Municipal Airport (IATA: PCD, ICAO: KPDC, FAA LID: PDC) is a city owned public use airport located two nautical miles (4 km) southeast of the central business district of Prairie du Chien, a city in Crawford County, Wisconsin, United States. It is included in the Federal Aviation Administration (FAA) National Plan of Integrated Airport Systems for 2025–2029, in which it is categorized as a local general aviation facility.

Although most U.S. airports use the same three-letter location identifier for the FAA and IATA, this airport is assigned PDC by the FAA and PCD by the IATA (which assigned PDC to Mueo, New Caledonia).

== Facilities and aircraft ==
Prairie du Chien Municipal Airport covers an area of 257 acres (104 ha) at an elevation of 660 feet (201 m) above mean sea level. It has two asphalt paved runways: the primary runway 14/32 is 5,000 by 75 feet (1,524 x 23 m); and the crosswind runway 11/29 is 3,999 by 75 feet (1,219 x 23 m).

For the 12-month period ending August 8, 2022, the airport had 12,300 aircraft operations, an average of 34 per day: 96% general aviation, 4% air taxi and less than 1% military. In August 2024, there were 16 aircraft based at this airport: 15 single-engine and 1 jet.

== See also ==
- List of airports in Wisconsin
- US-18/Wis-35 runs by airport
