= Michael Dousman =

Fur trader

Michael Dousman (1771–1854) was an American fur trader and merchant with business interests in and around Mackinac Island during the War of 1812 period.

== Biography ==
Born in 1771 on the British colonial frontier in Pittsburgh, Michael Dousman became a trapper and fur trader. He gradually moved northwest to the area along the border with Upper Canada by the Great Lakes. In the years before the War of 1812, he was a prominent trader on Mackinac Island, with connections and interests among the Ojibwe on both sides of the border, and business with British Canadians.

He was captured in July 1812 by a British force as part of their operations against Fort Mackinac. Dousman was paroled on condition that he gather all Mackinac Island civilians in a safe place and not provide intelligence to the U.S. Army. Dousman's fulfillment of these conditions resulted in the British and Canadians accepting him as a key ally in their quest to retain control over the Straits of Mackinac area throughout the war.

After the War of 1812, Dousman renewed his loyalty to the United States. He was granted new licenses to trade furs by the government on condition that he affiliate his operations with John Jacob Astor's American Fur Company, which had become dominant in this area and ultimately established a monopoly. Dousman became more successful than ever, especially as British Canadians were prohibited from trading on the United States side of the border between the countries, unlike the open conditions before the war. The trader acquired a large farm on the northern third of Mackinac Island. This was developed in the late 19th century as today's Wawashkamo Golf Club.

Among the lower-level traders he employed was John Drew, who later became independent. Dousman also pursued other business interests in the area. He owned and operated a sawmill powered by current through the Straits of Mackinac. This structure has been reconstructed in the late 20th century as the centerpiece of Dousman's Mill (formerly known as Historic Mill Creek State Park).

=== Marriage and family ===
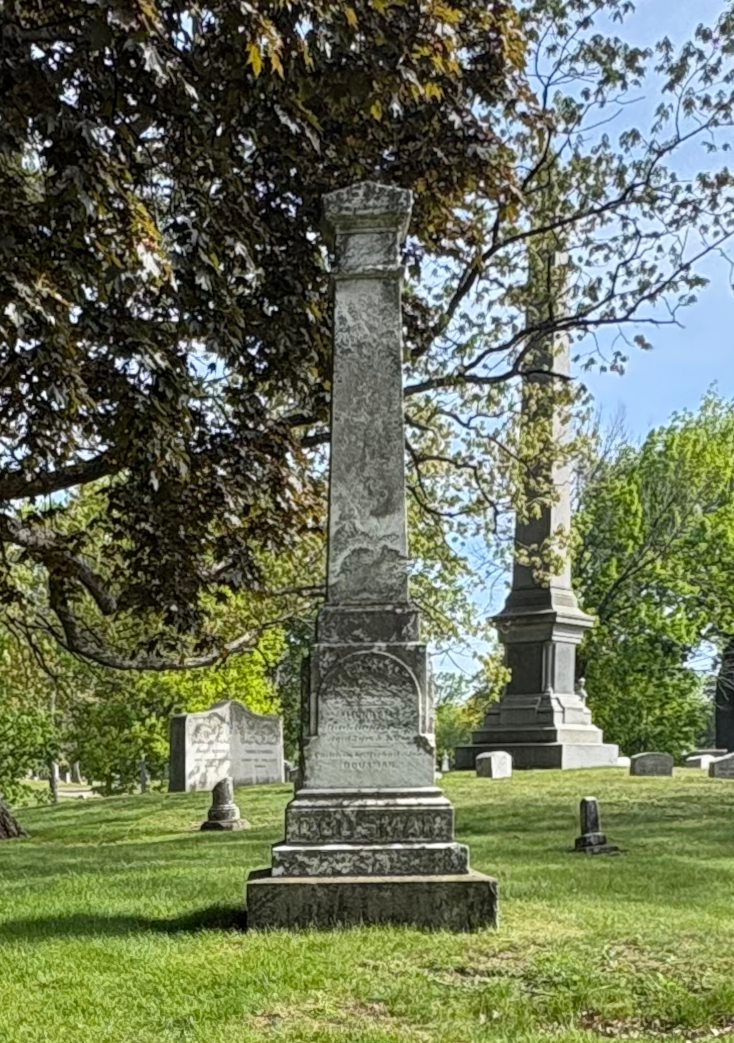
Dousman's grave at Forest Home Cemetery

Dousman married and had a family. His son Hercules L. Dousman later became a noted pioneer in what was developed as the state of Wisconsin.

Michael Dousman died in Milwaukee on August 11, 1854, and was buried at Forest Home Cemetery.

== Legacy ==
The schooner Michael Dousman, which sailed on the upper Great Lakes from 1843–1853, was named after the trader.
