= H. Louis Dousman =

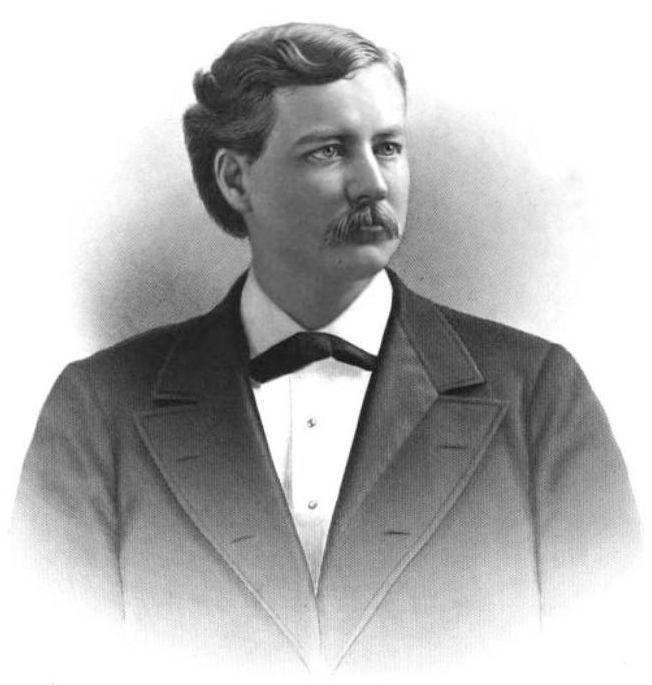
- Born: April 3, 1848; Prairie du Chien, Wisconsin
- Died: January 13, 1886 (aged 37); Prairie du Chien, Wisconsin
- Spouse: Nina Linn Sturgis (m. 1873)

Hercules Louis Dousman II (April 3, 1848 – January 13, 1886), better known as Louis Dousman, was notable as a wealthy Midwestern socialite and art collector. He was the heir to the estate of Wisconsin millionaire Hercules Louis Dousman, who had made a career in Prairie du Chien. Dousman had a new mansion built on the site of his family's house, and then soon moved away, living for years in St. Paul, Minnesota, and St. Louis, Missouri. In both cities he moved in upper social circles.

After his mother's death in 1882, Dousman began to develop the family property to establish a stock farm and racing for Standardbred horses. He built a racetrack and started an annual race in July 1883. He returned to the city in 1885, establishing the Artesian Stock Farm, but died unexpectedly the next year before getting it well underway. His widow closed the farm and named the mansion as Villa Louis after Louis Dousman. It has been designated as a National Historic Landmark.

== Early life and education ==
Louis Dousman was born in 1848 in Prairie du Chien, Wisconsin, the son of Hercules and Jane (Fisher) Rolette Dousman. His father had been a fur trader and developed great wealth as an investor and entrepreneur on the frontier, influential in expanding railroad construction across the state, exploiting the lumber industry, and investing in real estate. He was a millionaire before he died, when the United States held few figures of such wealth.

As a child, Louis was privately tutored; he later attended a preparatory school in Madison, Wisconsin. His higher education was cut short by the death of his father in 1868. The son returned to Prairie du Chien to take care of his father's estate and help his widowed mother Jane.

== Life as heir ==
In 1870, at the age of 22, Dousman began using his inheritance. He demolished the brick house built by his father, where he had grown up, and replaced it with a modern mansion of the era. It was designed in the Italianate style by E. Townsend Mix. Dousman did not stay long in Prairie du Chien.

In 1872, he moved to the larger city of Saint Paul, Minnesota, leaving his mother to occupy the Prairie du Chien estate. Owing to his wealth and his father's onetime partnership with Henry Hastings Sibley, who had earlier served as Governor of Minnesota, Dousman rose quickly in St. Paul society. In 1873 he married Nina Sturgis, and the couple moved to St. Louis, Missouri. They had five children: Violet, Virginia, Nina, Louis, and Judith Dousman.

Dousman's father had also had prominent connections in St. Louis. Dousman readily entered its uppermost social circles. He began a career as an art collector, amassing a collection of nearly a hundred paintings, mostly Academic art from France. In 1879, he constructed a gallery adjoining his St. Louis home to showcase his collection and began opening the gallery to the public. His art collection was eventually published in 1881. Dousman received much attention in both St. Louis and other major cities across the nation for his collection. He served as art director for three years for the St. Louis Fair.

In the 1880s his interest began to shift. Following the death of his mother in 1882, Dousman sold most of his art collection at auction in New York City. He made plans to return to Prairie du Chien. He wanted to develop the larger part of his property into a stock farm for the breeding of Standardbred horses, specifically, a line descended from Hambletonian 10. Dousman had stables and a racetrack built in Prairie du Chien, and began hosting an annual race in July 1883. He named his estate as the Artesian Stock Farm, because of the artesian wells on the property. Dousman moved all of his family from St. Louis to Prairie du Chien in 1885.

Dousman's plans for the Artesian Stock Farm were never fully realized. On January 13, 1886, he died unexpectedly of appendicitis in Prairie du Chien. After Dousman's death, his wife Nina sold the horses and closed the stock farm. She renamed the mansion and its associated property as Villa Louis in honor of her late husband.

Today Villa Louis is preserved and operated as a museum by the Wisconsin Historical Society. It is designated as a National Historic Landmark.
