= Hercules L. Dousman =

American businessman

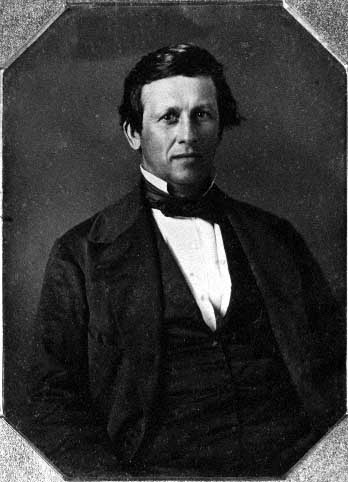
Hercules L. Dousman

Hercules Louis Dousman (August 4, 1800 – September 12, 1868) was a fur trader and real-estate speculator who played a large role in the economic development of frontier Wisconsin. He is often called Wisconsin's first millionaire.

== Early life and trading activities ==
Dousman was born in 1800 on Mackinac Island, Michigan, the son of Michael Dousman, a prominent local fur trader, and his wife. His father was highly successful and sent the son to the eastern United States to be educated in Elizabethtown, New Jersey. For a period he worked as a clerk in a New York City store.

After Dousman returned to Mackinac Island, he was employed by the American Fur Company, which his father had served as an agent following the War of 1812. In 1826, the company sent Dousman to the frontier settlement of Prairie du Chien, Wisconsin, where he worked as an assistant to Joseph Rolette, the company's local agent.

In Prairie du Chien, Dousman proved his abilities as a trader, quickly rising in the company's ranks. By 1834 he had acquired an interest in the company's Western Outfit, and in 1840 he became an equal partner in the business together with Joseph Rolette and Henry Hastings Sibley.

In 1842 the American Fur Company declared bankruptcy, as the European market had declined, and furs were harder to find in the West. To continue in the trade, Dousman entered into a joint venture with Rolette, Sibley, and Pierre Chouteau (of St. Louis, Missouri) to organize a new company to replace it on upper Mississippi. A few months later, Rolette died in debt to the new company, and most of his estate was seized by the remaining partners, including Dousman. With this and other revenue, Dousman acquired more wealth.

He began to invest in lumber mills in northern Wisconsin and real estate in some of the state's growing population centers. Timber was in high demand in the developing settlements of the upper Midwest.

As Dousman began building his investments during the 1830s, he began a long affair with Margaret Campbell, a local Prairie du Chien woman, who may have been of mixed-race. Together they had three children: Emily, George, and a third unnamed child who died at birth in 1838. Campbell also died of complications at this birth.

In 1844, two years after Joseph Rolette's death, Dousman married his widow, Jane. (She and Rolette had legally separated in 1836, and he built a house for her.) Together the couple moved into the large two-story brick house that Dousman had constructed a year earlier. Hercules and Jane Dousman had one son, Hercules Louis Dousman II, who was born on April 3, 1848, the year that Wisconsin became a state.

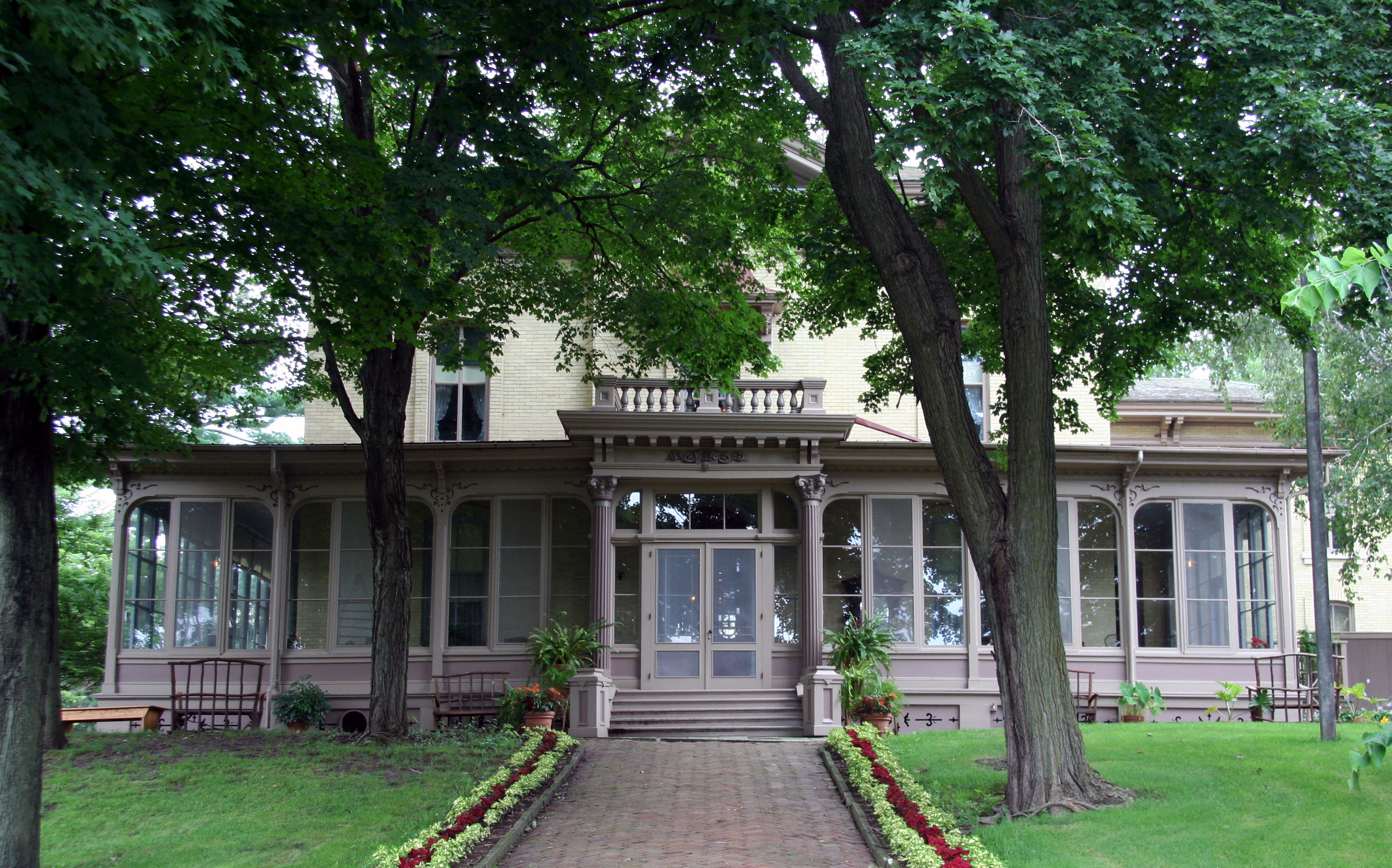
The Villa Louis

In the 1870s the Dousman house at this site was replaced with what is known as Villa Louis. This was also called the "House on the Mound", because of its location on what is believed to be a prehistoric Indian earthwork mound.

== Community leader ==
As Wisconsin and the region attracted more European Americans, the fur trade declined. The European demand had declined with changes of fashion and the Native Americans, who provided the pelts and were important customers for manufactured goods, were being pushed west by new settlers. Dousman withdrew from the fur trade in the late 1840s and focused on his investments. In addition to having numerous holdings in real estate, grain, and lumber, Dousman became involved in transportation companies. He invested in packet companies and steamboats that ran on the Mississippi River.

In 1852, Dousman became a principal investor in the Madison & Prairie du Chien Railroad, a company formed to ensure that the larger Milwaukee & Mississippi Railroad would meet its goal of connecting Lake Michigan with the Mississippi River. The two companies combined a few years later, and eventually developed as the Chicago, Milwaukee, St. Paul and Pacific Railroad.

Dousman was very influential in bringing the railroad to Prairie du Chien by 1857, and the Milwaukee & Mississippi was the first railroad to lay track all the way across Wisconsin. Prairie du Chien's new rail connection caused a small boom in the city's population and business. Since Dousman owned much of the land in the city, he made a large profit from this . His net worth was estimated at one million dollars, when fewer than a thousand Americans could claim to possess such a figure.

== Death and legacy ==
Dousman died of heart failure on September 12, 1868. By this time he was regarded as one of Wisconsin's wealthiest and most influential men. His wife Jane and son Louis inherited his estate. Dousman is buried at Calvary Cemetery in Prairie du Chien.

- Although he died before Villa Louis was constructed, the mansion is preserved as a recognized historic site in part because of Dousman's significance in the region.
- Dousman is featured as the central character in two novels by August Derleth, Bright Journey and The House on the Mound.
