= Prairie du Chien, Wisconsin =

City in Wisconsin, United States

- City
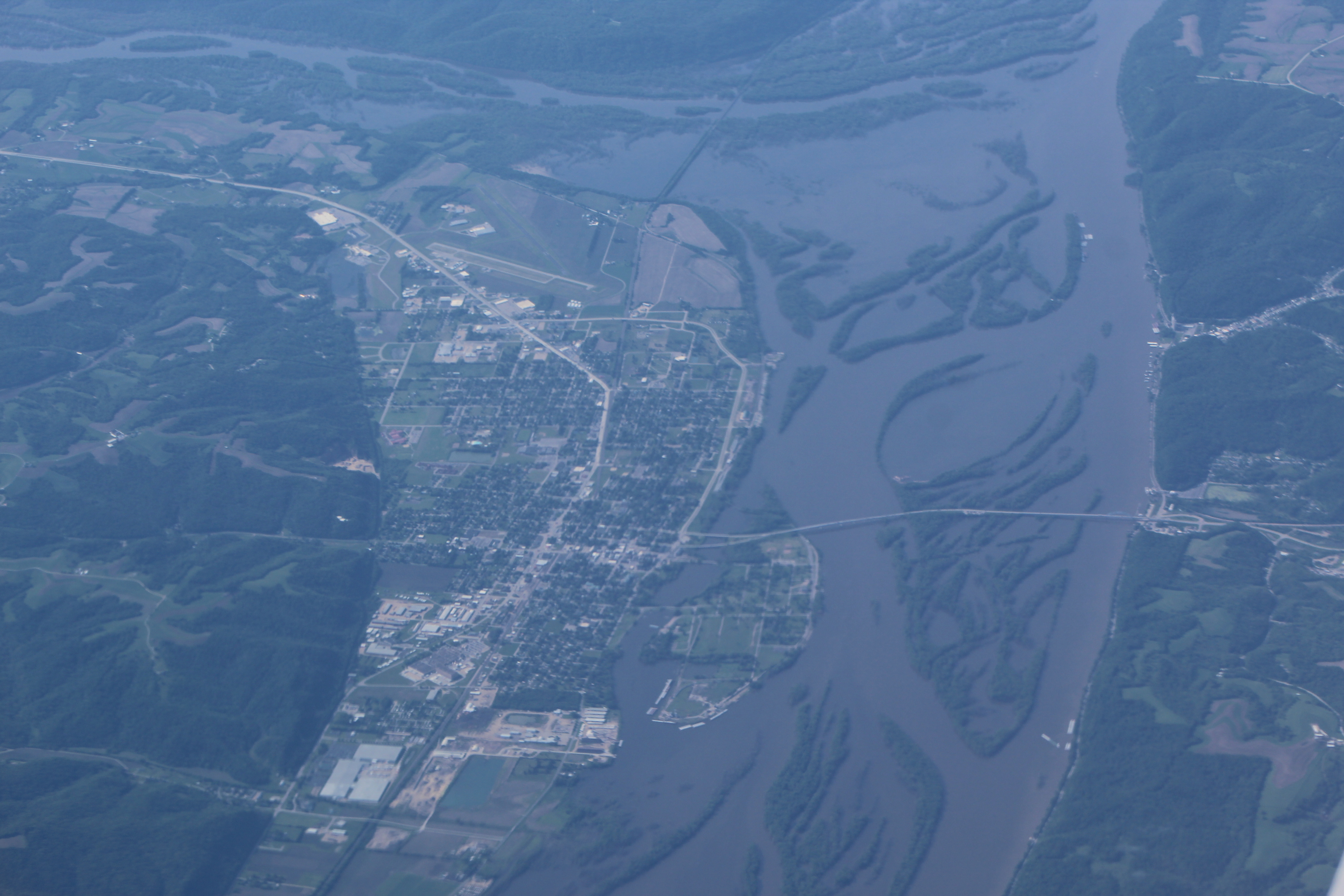
- Aerial photo of Prairie du Chien

- Location of Prairie du Chien in Crawford County, Wisconsin

- Location within Wisconsin Location within the United States
- Coordinates: 43°03′06″N 91°08′29″W
- Municipality: City

Area
  - Total: 6.47 sq mi (16.76 km^{2})
  - Land: 5.84 sq mi (15.13 km^{2})
  - Water: 0.63 sq mi (1.63 km^{2})

Population (2020)
  - Total: 5,506
  - Density: 942/sq mi (363.8/km^{2})
- Time zone: UTC−6 (Central)
  - Summer (DST): UTC−5 (CDT)
- ZIP Code: 53821
- Area code: 608
- FIPS code: 55-65050
- Website: https://cityofpdc.com/

Prairie du Chien (/ˌprɛəri du ˈʃiːn/ PRAIR-ee doo SHEEN) is a city in Crawford County, Wisconsin, United States, and its county seat. The population was 5,506 at the 2020 census. Often called Wisconsin's second-oldest city, Prairie du Chien was established as a European settlement by French voyageurs in the late 17th century. Its settlement date of June 17, 1673, makes it the fourth colonial settlement by European settlers in the Midwestern United States, after Green Bay, Wisconsin; Sault Ste. Marie, Michigan; and St. Ignace, Michigan. The city has many sites showing its rich history in the region.

Prairie du Chien is near the confluence of the Wisconsin and Mississippi rivers, a strategic point along the Fox-Wisconsin Waterway that connects the Great Lakes with the Mississippi. This location offered early French missionaries and explorers their first access and entrance to the Mississippi River. Early French visitors to the site found it occupied by a group of Meskwaki led by a chief whose name Alim meant chien in French ('dog' in English). The French explorers named the location Prairie du Chien, French for 'dog's meadow'. Originally, this name applied only to the plain upon which the settlement lay, but it was later applied to the city. The city of Prairie du Chien is located partly in the town of Prairie du Chien and partly in the town of Bridgeport.

== History ==
The first known Europeans to reach Prairie du Chien were French explorers Jacques Marquette and Louis Joliet, who arrived by canoe on June 17, 1673, discovering a route to the Mississippi River. Later travel between Canada and the Mississippi River continued to pass through Prairie du Chien, although routes via the Illinois River were also used. In 1685, the French explorer Nicolas Perrot established a trading post in the area as part of the large and lucrative French fur trade industry. After John Jacob Astor's machinations had closed the entire government fur trade factory system and the federal factory established in Prairie du Chien in 1815, the American Fur Company became established in the area and later built the Astor Fur Warehouse, an important building in the regional fur trade, which was centered in Prairie du Chien. Prairie du Chien's significance as a center of the fur trade did not diminish until the mid-19th century, when European demand declined, as did game stock.

In 1763, after Great Britain defeated France in the French and Indian War (part of the Seven Years' War), it took possession of the French territory in North America east of the Mississippi River, including Prairie du Chien. During the American Revolutionary War, the city was used as a meeting point for British troops and their Native American allies. After the American victory, the Treaty of Paris granted the area to the new United States, but the British and their Loyalists were slow to withdraw. Only after the War of 1812 did the city become fully American.

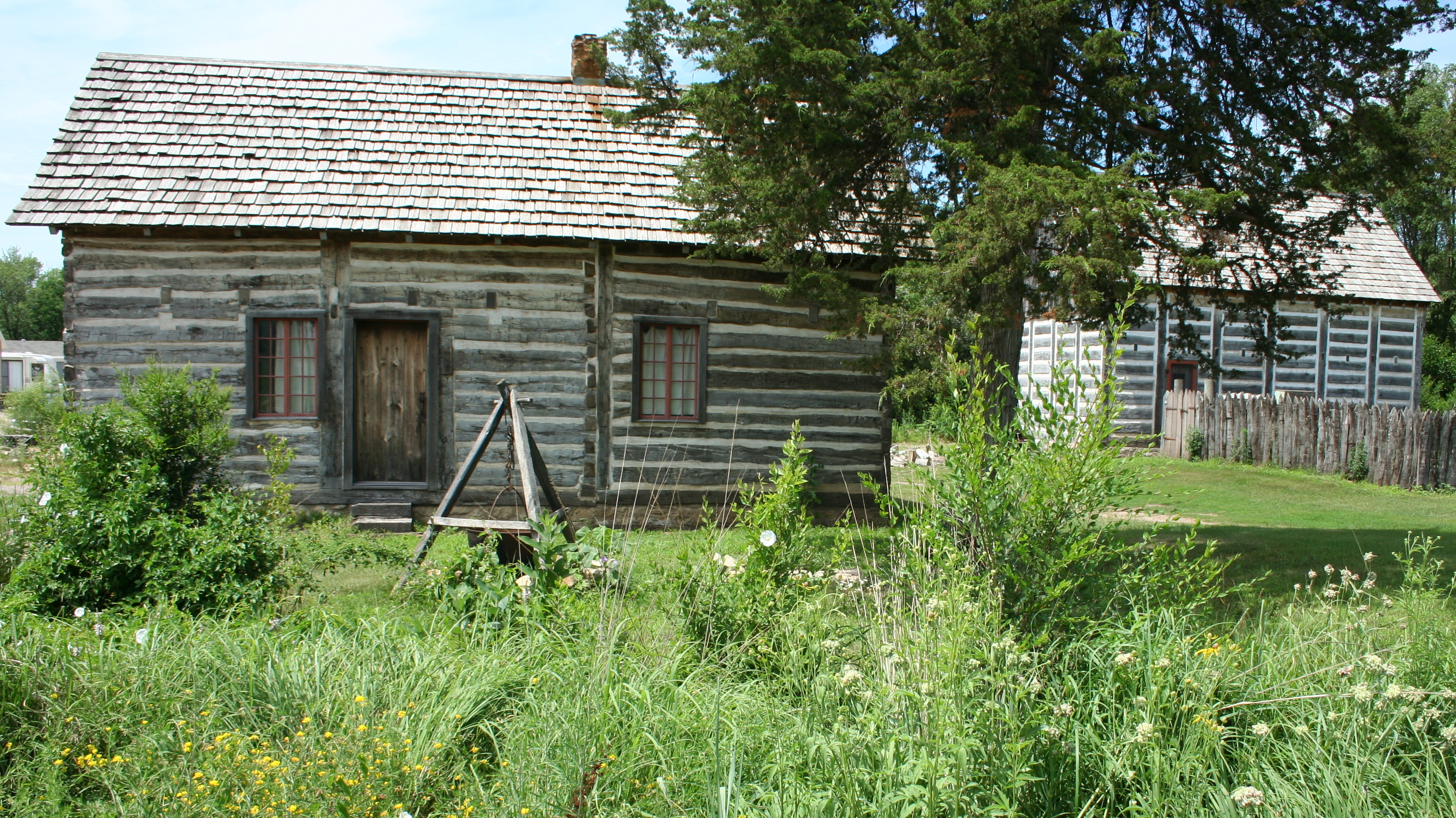
The Francois Vertefeuille House in the Town of Prairie du Chien was built in the 1810s by fur traders. A rare example of the pièce-sur-pièce à coulisse technique once common in French-Canadian buildings, it is one of the oldest buildings in Wisconsin and is listed on the National Register of Historic Places.

The U.S. was slow to present any authority over Prairie du Chien, but late in the War of 1812, when the government realized the importance of holding the site to prevent British attacks from Canada, it began construction of Fort Shelby in 1814. In July, British soldiers captured the fort during the Siege of Prairie du Chien. The British maintained control over the city until the war's end in 1815. Not wanting another invasion through Prairie du Chien, the Americans constructed Fort Crawford in 1816. Veteran John Shaw would later lead and fund the construction of a flour mill in 1818, the first in the "northwest".

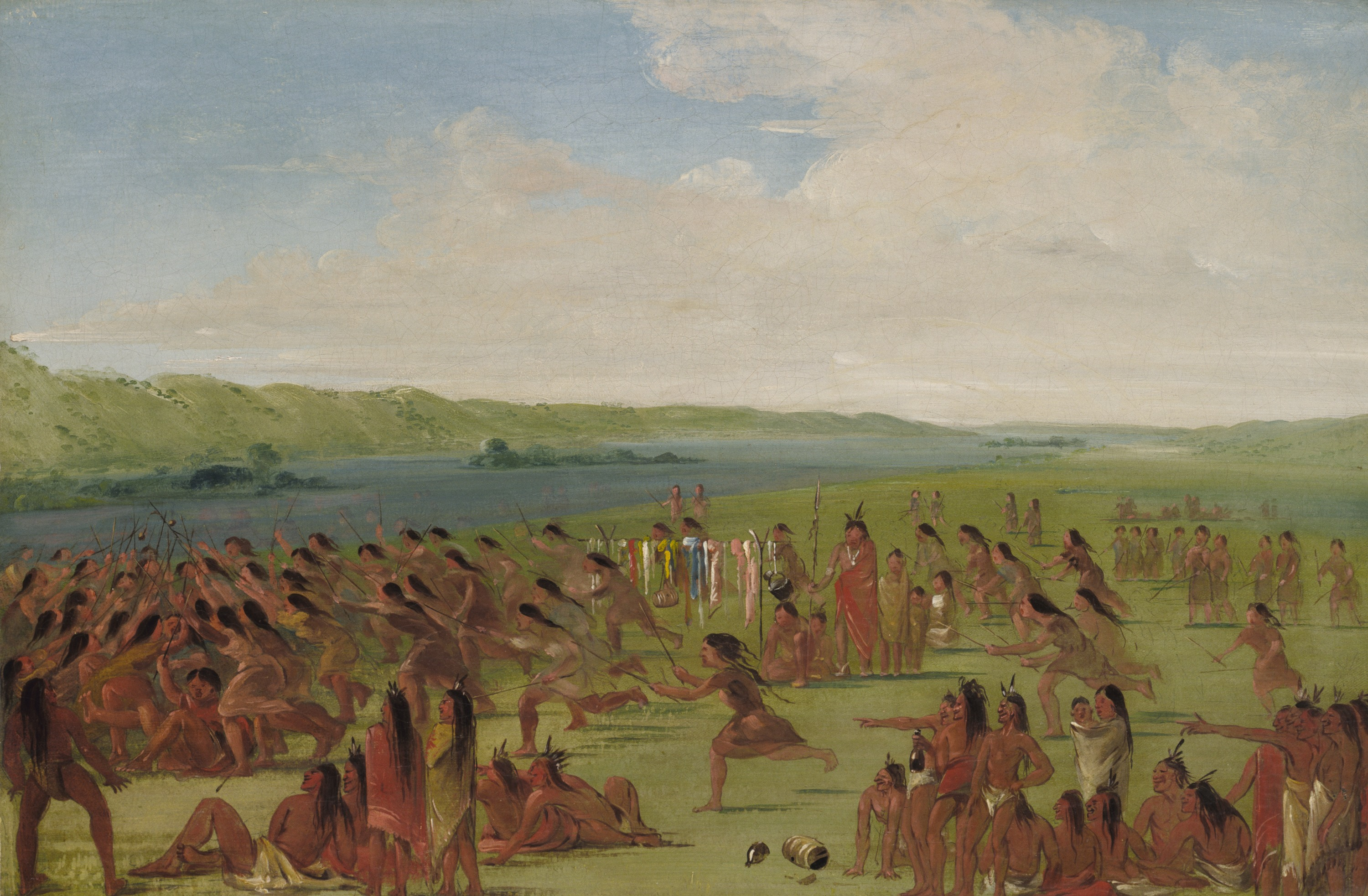
Ball-play of the Women, Prairie du Chien, oil painting by George Catlin, 1835–1836

The fort was the site of the negotiations and signing of the Treaties of Prairie du Chien (1825 and 1830), by which the Meskwaki and Sauk ceded much of their land to the U.S. Representing them along with the United Nations of the Ojibwe, Odawa and Potawatomi in the 1829 negotiations was Billy Caldwell, of Scots-Irish and Mohawk descent. He became involved with the Potawatomi after moving as a young man to the U.S. from Canada.

In 1829, the army doctor William Beaumont carried out many experiments on digestion in the hospital at Fort Crawford. Beaumont's discoveries are still the basis of current knowledge of the human digestive process.

Colonel Zachary Taylor, who later became the 12th U.S. president, was the commanding officer at Fort Crawford during the Black Hawk War of 1832. Taylor oversaw the surrender of Black Hawk in Prairie du Chien. Lieutenant Jefferson Davis, who later became president of the Confederate States of America, was stationed at Fort Crawford at the same time. There, Davis met Taylor's daughter, Sarah "Knoxie" Taylor, whom he married in 1835.

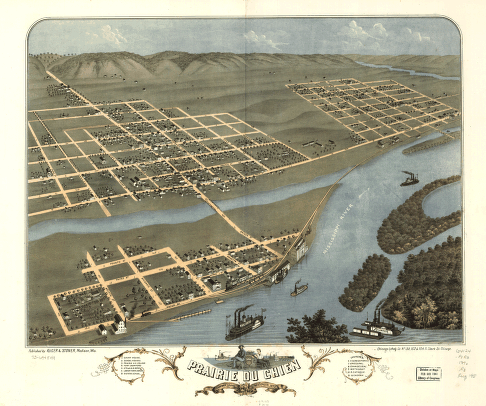
Illustration of Prairie du Chien in 1870

Outside the fort's walls, early-19th-century life in Prairie du Chien was still dominated by the fur trade. Prairie du Chien's best-known traders during this time were Michel Brisbois, Joseph Rolette, Nathan Myrick, and Hercules L. Dousman. Dousman built a fortune in the fur trade, which, combined with income from investments in land, steamboats, and railroads, propelled him to become Wisconsin's first millionaire. He died in 1868, and his son, H. Louis Dousman, inherited much of his fortune. In 1870, Louis Dousman used his inheritance to construct a luxurious Victorian mansion at the site of the former Fort Shelby. When he died unexpectedly in 1886, his family renamed the home "Villa Louis" in his memory. The Dousman family continued to occupy the home until 1913. In 1952, the mansion became Wisconsin's first state-operated historic site.

After the fur trade declined in the mid-19th century, Prairie du Chien's attention shifted to agriculture and the railroad. Although the city was first connected to the Milwaukee & Mississippi Railroad in 1857, the width of the Mississippi River posed a challenge for further expansion of the railroad into Iowa. This problem was temporarily solved by disassembling the trains at Prairie du Chien and ferrying them across the river to be put back on the tracks on the other side. A better solution was found by Michael Spettel and John Lawler, who designed the permanent Pile-Pontoon Railroad Bridge to span the river in 1874. Lawler took most of the credit for this invention, and made a small fortune through its operation. The bridge remained in use until its removal in 1961.

Lawler later donated property to establish two Catholic boarding schools in Prairie du Chien, St. Mary's Institute (now Mount Mary College of Milwaukee) and Campion High School in the later part of the century. St. Mary's College remained in Prairie du Chien until 1928. Campion High School produced several notable alumni, including Vicente Fox, Congressman Leo Ryan, Governor Patrick Lucey, actors David Doyle, George Wendt, and Kevin McCarthy, and writer Garry Wills. It closed in 1975.

=== History of municipal government ===
Prairie du Chien was incorporated as the Borough of Prairie des Chiens on September 17, 1821, by the secretary of the Michigan Territory. It is the only municipality in Wisconsin other than Green Bay to have been known as a borough, rather than a city, town, or village. The borough existed for a few years before the government stopped operating in 1825.

In 1828, the Prairie du Chien area became a part of the Town of St. Anthony, which included all of Crawford County. (Crawford County itself included all of the western part of Michigan Territory.) In 1849, the Town of Prairie du Chien was created, consisting of most of present-day Crawford County. The city of Prairie du Chien was incorporated in 1872.

== Geography ==
Prairie du Chien is in the Mississippi River Valley, upon a long triangular plain bounded on the west by the Mississippi River, on the south by the Wisconsin River, and on the east-northeast by a series of tall bluffs. According to the United States Census Bureau, the city has an area of 6.47 square miles (16.76 km^{2}), of which 5.84 square miles (15.13 km^{2}) is land and 0.63 square miles (1.63 km^{2}) is water. The city's area encompasses most of the plain upon which it sits, but portions of the plain extend outside city limits. Just north of the city limits, where the plain forms part of the Town of Prairie du Chien, is a small unincorporated settlement known locally as Frenchtown. The plain also extends outside the city southward into Bridgeport. Here the plain ends, becoming the wetlands of the Wisconsin River delta.

Both inside and outside the city limits, backwaters of the Mississippi River occasionally break across the far west side of the plain to form small islands. Most of these islands are too small and flood-prone to have ever been inhabited, but one just west of downtown Prairie du Chien formed the city's fourth ward until a 1965 flood prompted its residents' mandatory relocation to higher ground. During the relocation project, most buildings with no special historical significance were removed. Now called St. Feriole Island, the island serves as a 240-acre (1.0 km^{2}) city park.

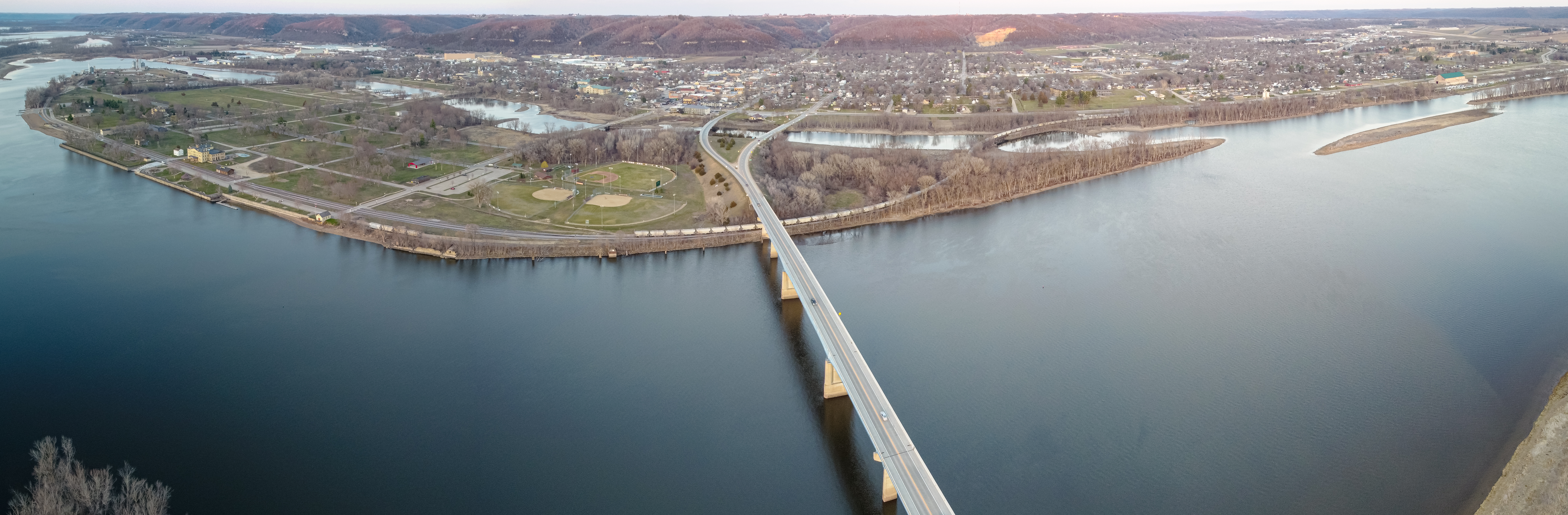

=== Climate ===
Prairie du Chien has recorded Wisconsin's highest temperatures for January, March, May, September, and November.

Climate data for Prairie du Chien, Wisconsin (1991–2020 normals, extremes 1893–present)
Month	Jan	Feb	Mar	Apr	May	Jun	Jul	Aug	Sep	Oct	Nov	Dec	Year
Record high °F (°C)	66 (19)	70 (21)	89 (32)	96 (36)	109 (43)	105 (41)	110 (43)	106 (41)	104 (40)	93 (34)	85 (29)	70 (21)	110 (43)
Mean maximum °F (°C)	46.7 (8.2)	52.6 (11.4)	68.6 (20.3)	79.7 (26.5)	87.2 (30.7)	92.1 (33.4)	93.0 (33.9)	91.6 (33.1)	88.5 (31.4)	82.4 (28.0)	66.4 (19.1)	51.9 (11.1)	95.0 (35.0)
Mean daily maximum °F (°C)	27.1 (−2.7)	32.1 (0.1)	44.9 (7.2)	58.6 (14.8)	70.2 (21.2)	79.6 (26.4)	83.1 (28.4)	81.3 (27.4)	74.2 (23.4)	61.7 (16.5)	45.9 (7.7)	32.9 (0.5)	57.6 (14.2)
Daily mean °F (°C)	18.4 (−7.6)	22.7 (−5.2)	34.9 (1.6)	47.6 (8.7)	59.2 (15.1)	69.2 (20.7)	73.1 (22.8)	71.1 (21.7)	63.1 (17.3)	50.9 (10.5)	37.0 (2.8)	25.0 (−3.9)	47.7 (8.7)
Mean daily minimum °F (°C)	9.7 (−12.4)	13.3 (−10.4)	24.9 (−3.9)	36.6 (2.6)	48.2 (9.0)	58.9 (14.9)	63.1 (17.3)	61.0 (16.1)	52.0 (11.1)	40.1 (4.5)	28.2 (−2.1)	17.1 (−8.3)	37.8 (3.2)
Mean minimum °F (°C)	−13.5 (−25.3)	−8.1 (−22.3)	3.5 (−15.8)	22.4 (−5.3)	33.2 (0.7)	45.3 (7.4)	52.2 (11.2)	51.2 (10.7)	37.3 (2.9)	25.0 (−3.9)	12.2 (−11.0)	−4.4 (−20.2)	−17.4 (−27.4)
Record low °F (°C)	−37 (−38)	−36 (−38)	−33 (−36)	0 (−18)	21 (−6)	34 (1)	38 (3)	35 (2)	20 (−7)	4 (−16)	−17 (−27)	−26 (−32)	−37 (−38)
Average precipitation inches (mm)	1.22 (31)	1.26 (32)	2.05 (52)	4.04 (103)	4.68 (119)	5.83 (148)	4.12 (105)	4.15 (105)	3.99 (101)	2.72 (69)	2.12 (54)	1.56 (40)	37.74 (959)
Average snowfall inches (cm)	9.0 (23)	8.6 (22)	4.3 (11)	1.4 (3.6)	0.0 (0.0)	0.0 (0.0)	0.0 (0.0)	0.0 (0.0)	0.0 (0.0)	0.2 (0.51)	1.5 (3.8)	8.8 (22)	33.8 (86)
Average precipitation days (≥ 0.01 in)	7.7	6.9	7.8	10.5	11.9	11.2	9.0	8.4	8.5	8.3	6.6	7.9	104.7
Average snowy days (≥ 0.1 in)	5.6	5.0	2.0	0.6	0.0	0.0	0.0	0.0	0.0	0.1	1.0	4.7	19.0
Source: NOAA

== Demographics ==
Historical population
Census	Pop.	Note	%±
1860	2,398		—
1870	2,700		12.6%
1880	2,777		2.9%
1890	3,131		12.7%
1900	3,232		3.2%
1910	3,149		−2.6%
1920	3,537		12.3%
1930	3,943		11.5%
1940	4,622		17.2%
1950	5,392		16.7%
1960	5,649		4.8%
1970	5,540		−1.9%
1980	5,859		5.8%
1990	5,659		−3.4%
2000	6,018		6.3%
2010	5,911		−1.8%
2020	5,506		−6.9%
U.S. Decennial Census

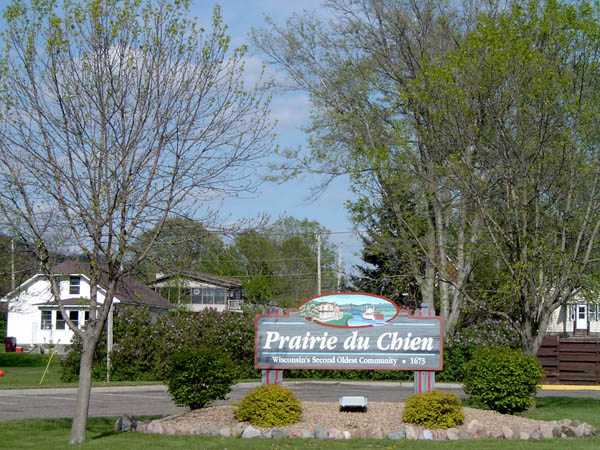
Welcome sign on entering from Iowa

=== 2020 census ===
As of the census of 2020, the population was 5,506. The population density was 942.3 inhabitants per square mile (363.8/km^{2}). There were 2,598 housing units at an average density of 444.6 per square mile (171.7/km^{2}). Ethnically, the population was 2.5% Hispanic or Latino of any race. When grouping both Hispanic and non-Hispanic people together by race, the city was 90.1% White, 4.3% Black or African American, 0.7% Native American, 0.5% Asian, 0.6% from other races, and 3.8% from two or more races.

The 2020 census population of the city included 514 people incarcerated in adult correctional facilities.

According to American Community Survey estimates for 2016-2020, the median income for a household in the city was $46,541, and the median income for a family was $64,315. Male full-time workers had a median income of $42,478 versus $35,313 for female workers. The per capita income was $25,407. About 10.5% of families and 16.2% of the population were below the poverty line, including 30.7% of those under age 18 and 14.6% of those age 65 or over.

There were 2,306 households, of which 18% had children under the age of 18 living with them, 40.1% were married couples living together, 8.5% had a female householder with no husband present, 4% had a male householder with no wife present, and 47.3% were non-families. 38.5% of all households were made up of individuals, and 17.3% had someone living alone who was 65 years of age or older. The average household size was 2.12 and the average family size was 2.87. Of the population age 25 and over, 92.0% were high school graduates or higher and 15.8% had a bachelor's degree or higher.

The median age in the city was 45.6 years. 16.6% of residents were under the age of 18; 8.8% were between the ages of 18 and 24; 24.07% were from 25 to 44; 28.2% were from 45 to 64; and 22.3% were 65 years of age or older. The gender makeup of the city was 54.4% male and 45.6% female.

=== 2010 census ===
As of the census of 2010, there were 5,911 people, 2,386 households, and 1,367 families residing in the city. The population density was 1,049.9 inhabitants per square mile (405.4/km^{2}). There were 2,594 housing units at an average density of 460.7 per square mile (177.9/km^{2}). The racial makeup of the city was 93.6% White, 4.5% African American, 0.4% Native American, 0.3% Asian, 0.3% from other races, and 0.9% from two or more races. Hispanic or Latino people of any race were 1.2% of the population.

There were 2,386 households, of which 26.6% had children under the age of 18 living with them, 41.9% were married couples living together, 10.9% had a female householder with no husband present, 4.4% had a male householder with no wife present, and 42.7% were non-families. 37.6% of all households were made up of individuals, and 17.8% had someone living alone who was 65 years of age or older. The average household size was 2.18 and the average family size was 2.86.

The median age in the city was 41.4 years. 21.6% of residents were under the age of 18; 8% were between the ages of 18 and 24; 24.9% were from 25 to 44; 27.3% were from 45 to 64; and 18.3% were 65 years of age or older. The gender makeup of the city was 52.4% male and 47.6% female.

=== 2000 census ===
As of the census of 2000, there were 6,018 people, 2,376 households, and 1,473 families residing in the city. The population density was 1,075.9 people per square mile (415.7/km^{2}). There were 2,564 housing units at an average density of 458.4 per square mile (177.1/km^{2}). The racial makeup of the city was 95.06% White, 3.61% Black or African American, 0.28% Native American, 0.17% Asian, 0.02% Pacific Islander, 0.08% from other races, and 0.78% from two or more races. 0.88% of the population were Hispanic or Latino of any race.

There were 2,376 households, out of which 29.3% had children under the age of 18 living with them, 48.7% were married couples living together, 10.2% had a female householder with no husband present, and 38.0% were non-families. 33.0% of all households were made up of individuals, and 17.1% had someone living alone who was 65 years of age or older. The average household size was 2.28 and the average family size was 2.92.

In the city, the population was spread out, with 24.2% under the age of 18, 11.4% from 18 to 24, 24.3% from 25 to 44, 21.8% from 45 to 64, and 18.3% who were 65 years of age or older. The median age was 38 years. For every 100 females, there were 100.5 males. For every 100 females age 18 and over, there were 97.3 males.

The median income for a household in the city was $34,038, and the median income for a family was $43,444. Males had a median income of $29,595 versus $20,183 for females. The per capita income for the city was $17,680. About 6.4% of families and 8.1% of the population were below the poverty line, including 11.7% of those under age 18 and 4.8% of those age 65 or over.

== Economy ==
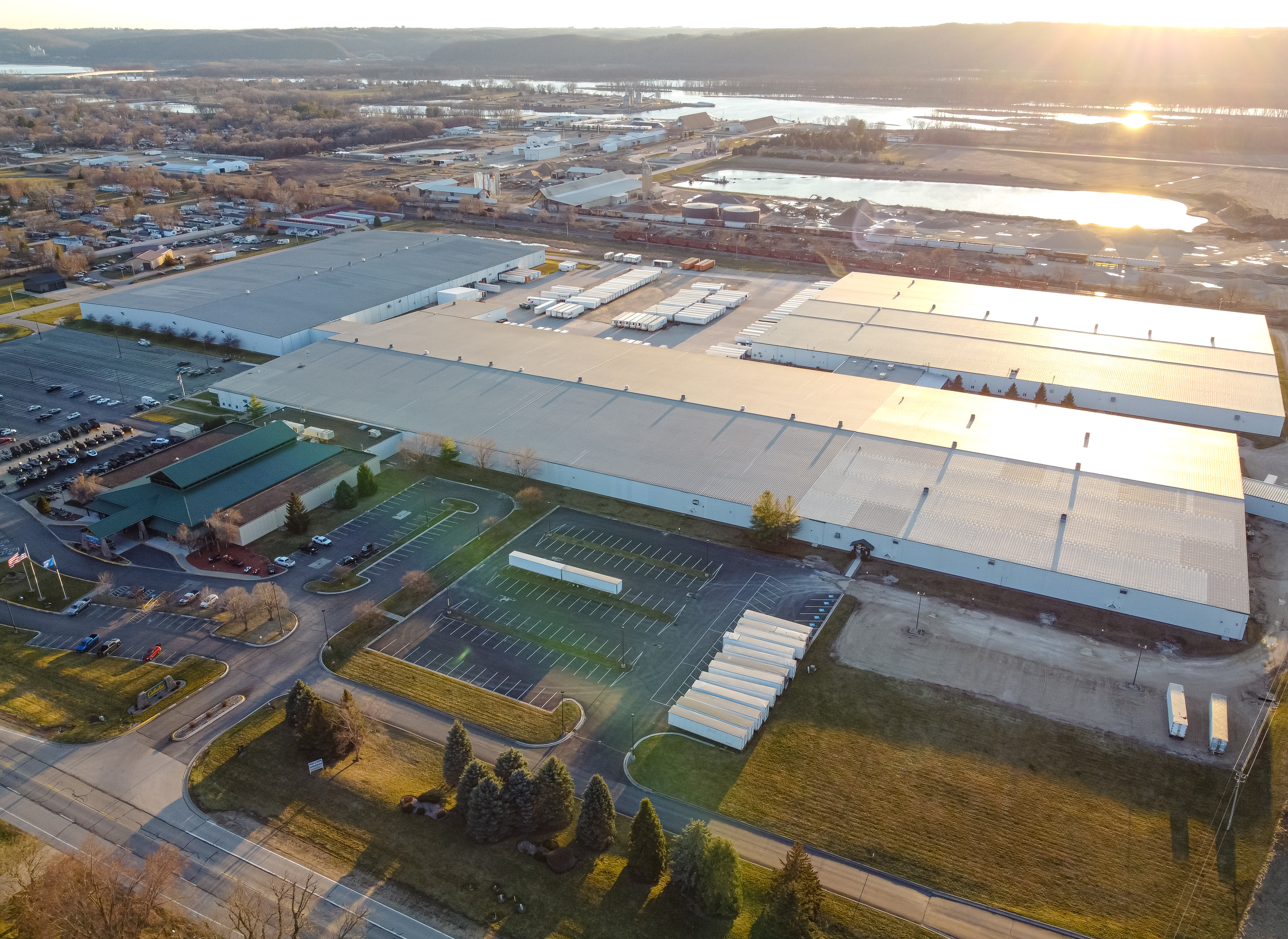
Cabela's distribution center in Prairie du Chien

Aside from its somewhat larger-than-average tourist trade, Prairie du Chien's economy is similar to most other Midwestern cities of its size. Retail, service, and manufacturing jobs employ most of the city's residents. Major employers include 3M and Cabela's. State and local government are also major employers, as the city is the site of the Crawford County courthouse and offices, as well as a state penitentiary. Prairie du Chien has one of Wisconsin's busiest ports on the Mississippi River. Two railroads and a two-runway municipal airport make the city a transport and shipping hub for the area.

== Arts and culture ==
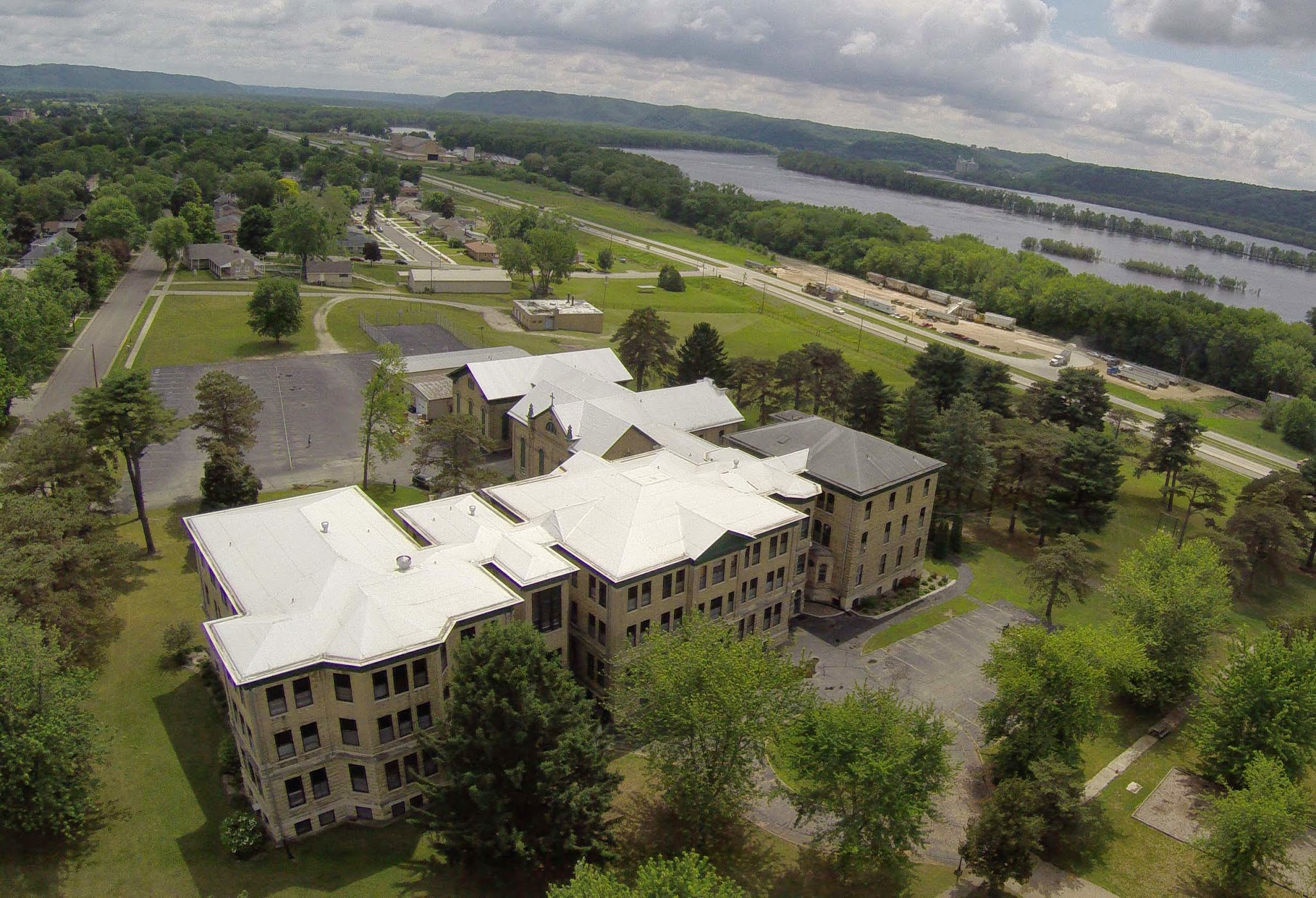
Wyalusing Academy, the former St. Mary's College

Prairie du Chien has five National Historic Landmarks and nine sites on the National Register of Historic Places. The five landmarks were the first designated in the state.

It is close to Wyalusing State Park in Wisconsin, and Effigy Mounds National Monument and Pikes Peak State Park in Iowa, sites of natural and manmade wonders. Its rich history and location by the Mississippi River make it a popular tourist destination. The Prairie Villa Rendezvous, a gathering to recreate the atmosphere of a 19th-century fur trading camp, has been held annually in the city every Father's Day weekend since 1975, attracting tens of thousands of visitors.

In 2001, Prairie du Chien gained brief national attention for its first annual New Year's Eve celebration, during which a carp from the Mississippi River was dropped from a crane over BlackHawk Avenue at midnight. The "Droppin' of the Carp" celebration has been held every New Year's Eve since.

Hunting and fishing have long been popular in the area. The opening of Cabela's fourth outlet store in the city in 1998 firmly established the city as a destination for sportsmen.

== Parks and recreation ==
The annual seven-day, 500-mile supported bike tour of Wisconsin known as GRABAAWR begins in Eagle River and ends in Prairie du Chien.

St. Feriole Island has a long riverfront with a park, connected to a bike path that goes around the island. Shelters can be used for large events. Across from the Villa Louis is a large open field that was once used as a horse racing track. On the far end of the field are two large soccer fields. Pets are allowed to run in the large fields.

== Education ==
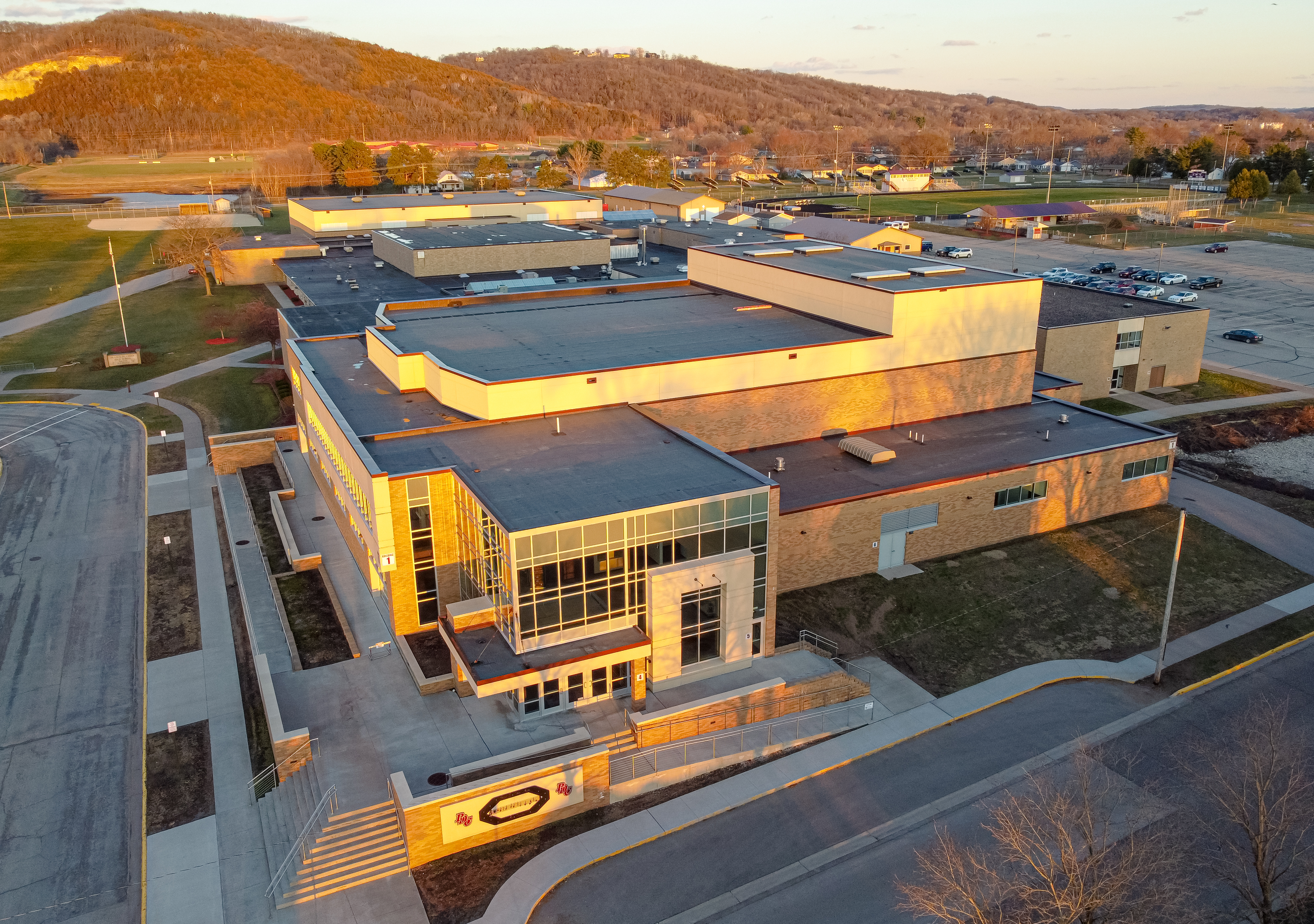
Prairie du Chien High School

The Prairie du Chien Area School District is a public school district headquartered in Prairie du Chien. It serves Prairie du Chien and the village of Eastman. The district comprises three schools, all in Prairie du Chien:

- B. A. Kennedy Elementary School (early childhood education – grade 1).
- Bluff View Intermediate School (grades 2–8)
- Prairie du Chien High School (grades 9–12)

The district's administrative offices are at B. A. Kennedy Elementary School.

Prairie Catholic School, a private K-8 school associated with St. Gabriel's and St. John's Catholic Churches, and Prairie Christian Academy, a private K-12 school associated with Bible Baptist Church, are also in Prairie du Chien.

== Media ==
Prairie du Chien's twice weekly newspaper is the Courier Press, which also publishes a weekly shopping supplement distributed to area households and businesses. Other print media in the area include the Wisconsin-Iowa Shopping News, which is distributed to 19,297 homes and businesses weekly.

Crawford County is in the La Crosse/Eau Claire broadcast media market as monitored by ACNielsen. The local cable system also carries some channels from the Madison market, and some residents receive over-the-air broadcasts from stations in the Cedar Rapids/Waterloo/Dubuque market.

Prairie du Chien is home to WQPC, a 36,000-watt radio station broadcasting at 94.3FM. The station is near the banks of the Mississippi River on St. Feriole Island. It has a sister station, WPRE 980 AM. Other stations with strong reception in Prairie du Chien include WHHI 91.3FM, WGLR 97.7FM and KCTN 100.1FM.

== Transportation ==
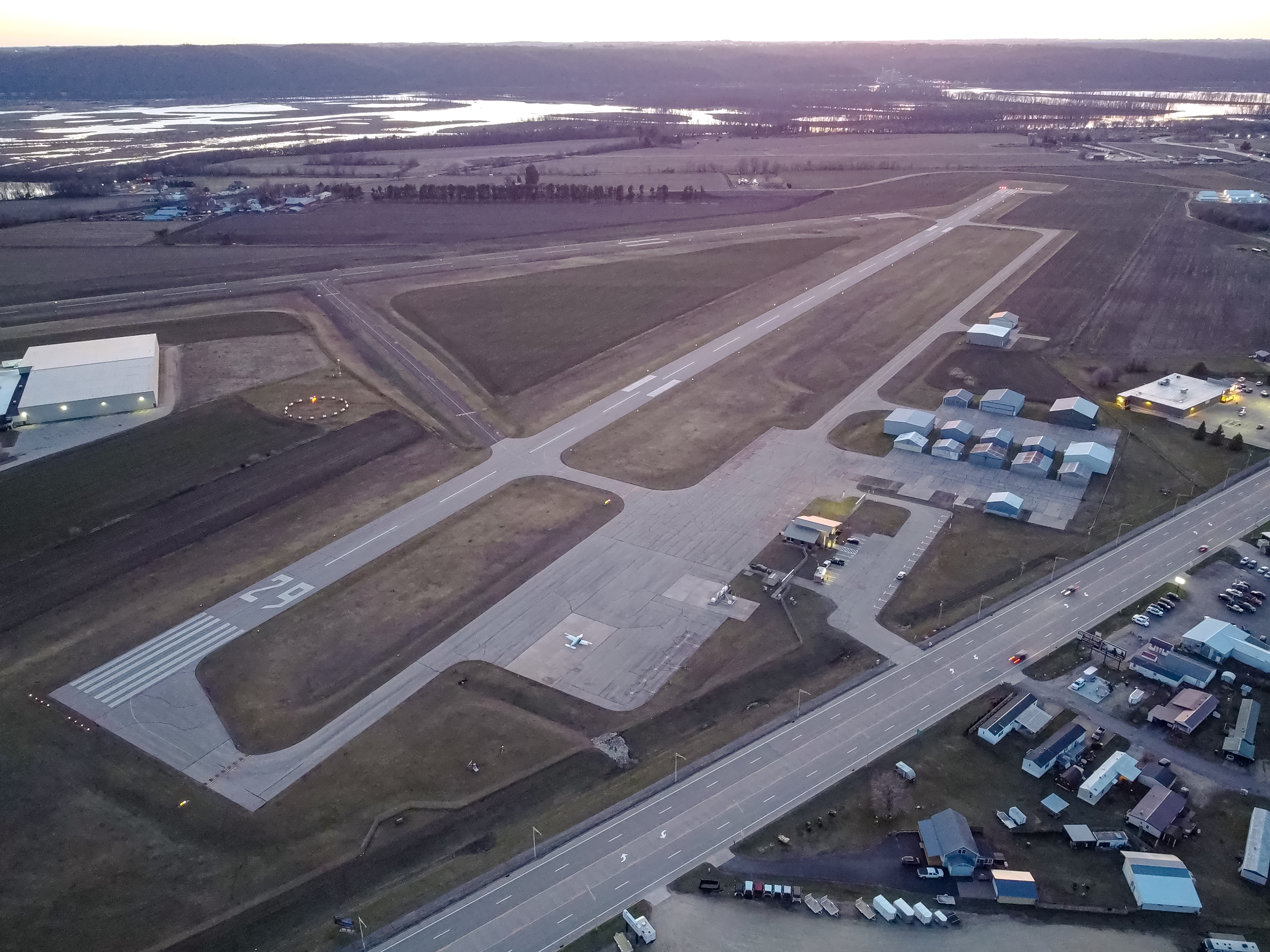
Prairie du Chien Municipal Airport

Bus service to La Crosse is provided three times daily by Scenic Mississippi Regional Transit.

Prairie du Chien is served by the Prairie du Chien Municipal Airport (KPDC).

Prairie Du Chien is served by two rail lines, the former Burlington Route line to Minneapolis and the former Milwaukee Road line from Chicago that has been abandoned west of the Mississippi River and in segments to Rapid City.

== Notable people ==
- Matthew Antoine (b. 1985), bronze medalist in men's skeleton at the 2014 Winter Olympics in Sochi, Russia
- William Beaumont, Army doctor in 1820s, carried out experiments on human digestion system at Fort Crawford hospital
- Barbara Bedford (1908–1981), silent film and Western actress
- Nicholas Boilvin (1761–1827), 19th Century frontiersman
- Pat Bowlen (1944–2019), owner of the Denver Broncos
- Michel Brisbois (1759–1837), voyageur
- Benjamin Bull, lawyer and Wisconsin State Senator
- Walter Bradford Cannon (1871–1945), physiologist who first developed concepts of fight or flight and homeostasis
- William D. Carroll, Wisconsin State Senator
- Jefferson Davis, president of Confederate States of America, was stationed at Fort Crawford in the 1830s
- Hercules Louis Dousman (1800–1868), real estate speculator and Wisconsin's first millionaire
- Alexander Faribault, trading post operator and Minnesota territorial legislator
- Johann Georg Hagen (1847–1930), Jesuit priest and astronomer
- Buel Hutchinson, lawyer and politician
- Daniel Harris Johnson, state Representative
- Edward I. Kidd, Wisconsin state legislator and businessman
- Wiram Knowlton (1816–1863), Wisconsin Supreme Court judge
- Daniel W. Lawler, mayor of Saint Paul, Minnesota
- Henry Leavenworth (1783–1834), U.S. army officer in War of 1812 and against Plains Indians
- James Henry Lockwood (1793–1857), lawyer, merchant, fur trapper
- Patrick Joseph Lucey (1918–2014), U.S. diplomat; 38th Governor of Wisconsin (1971–1977)
- Frederic O. MacCartney (1864–1903), Unitarian minister and Massachusetts socialist state legislator
- Thomas Mower McDougall (1845–1909), U.S. Army officer
- John Muir (1838–1914), conservationist and founder of Sierra Club, employed at boarding house in Prairie du Chien before attending University of Wisconsin–Madison
- John Powers, NFL player
- Leo Ryan (1925–1978), U.S. Representative from California
- Rodney J. Satter, state Representative
- Paul Scherrman, Iowa state legislature
- Daniel Bartlett Stevens, state Representative
- Joseph M. Street (1782–1840), U.S. Army officer and U.S. Indian agent to the Winnebago, Sauk, and Meskwaki tribes after the Black Hawk War
- Jeremiah Burnham Tainter (1836–1920), engineer who invented Tainter gate
- Ormsby B. Thomas, U.S. Representative
- Derrick Van Orden, U.S. Representative
- William Miller Wallace (1844–1924), U.S. Army general
- Wapello (1787–1842), Native American chief of the Meskwaki
- George Wendt (1948–2025), actor who portrayed Norm Peterson in television series Cheers, attended Campion High School in Prairie du Chien
- Brad Williams, memory specialist
