= Montholon (disambiguation) =

Montholon is a commune in the Yonne department, France.

Montholon may also refer to:

== Places ==
- Square Montholon, a square in Paris, France

== People ==
- Albine de Montholon (1779–1848), French noblewoman
- Charles Tristan, marquis de Montholon (1783–1853), French general
- Charles-François-Frédéric, marquis de Montholon-Sémonville (1814–1886), French politician and diplomat

== See also ==
- Monthelon (disambiguation)
