= Napoleon's exile to Saint Helena =

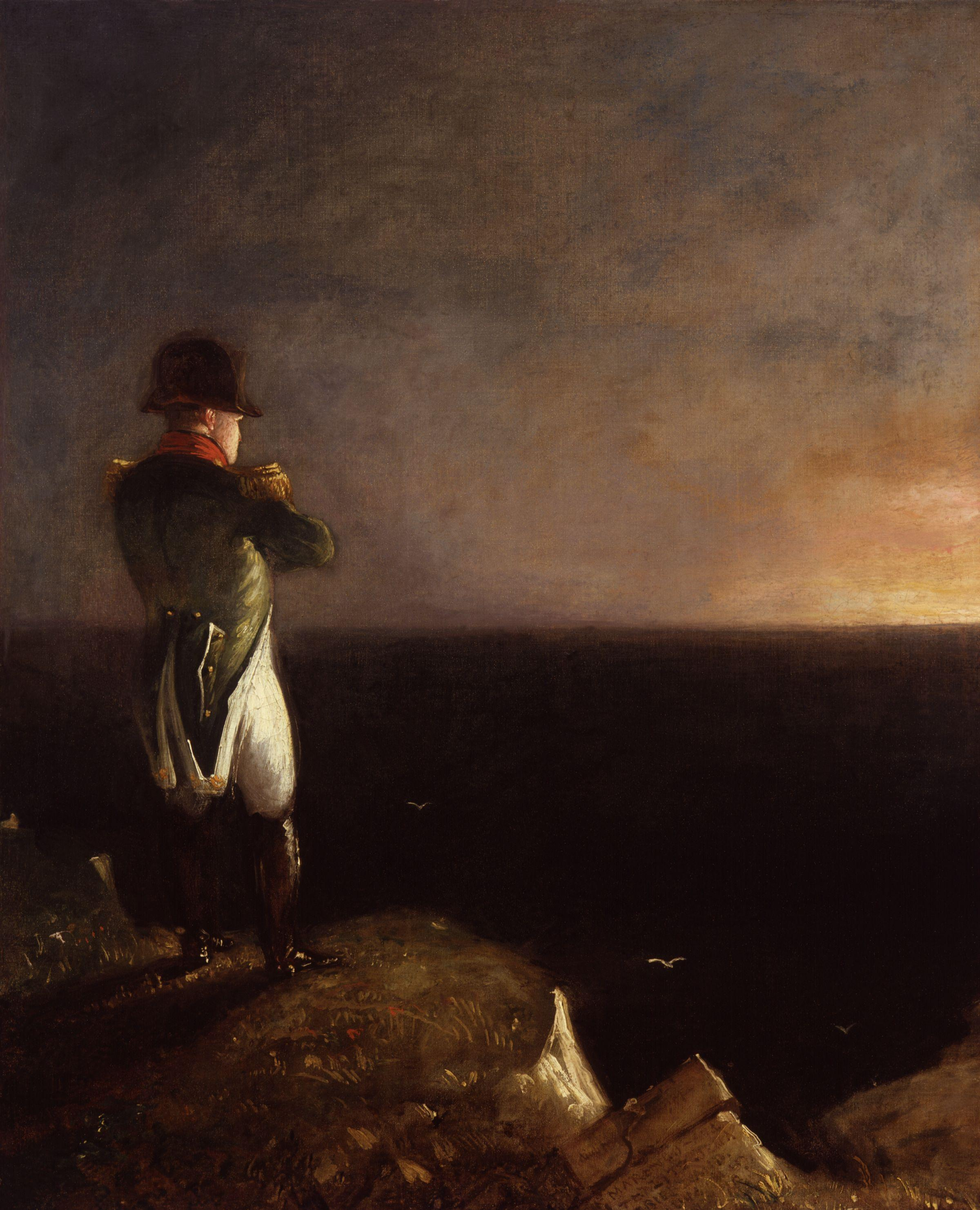
Painting of Napoleon in exile on Saint Helena

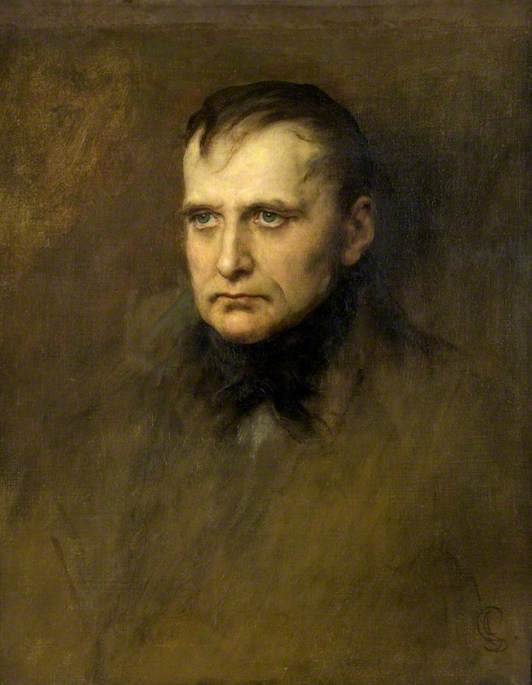
St. Helena: The Last Phase by James Sant, c. 1895

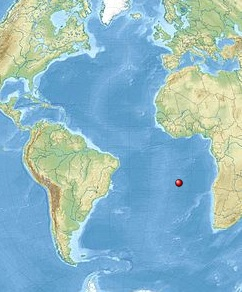
Location of Saint Helena

Napoleon's exile to the volcanic island of Saint Helena encompasses the final six years of his life, commencing with his second abdication at the end of the Hundred Days, which had concluded with his defeat at the Battle of Waterloo. Upon reaching Rochefort, Napoleon was unable to travel to the United States as he had wished. The British government had decided to imprison him and deport him to Saint Helena, situated in the middle of the Atlantic Ocean, with the intention of ensuring that he could no longer "disturb the peace of the world". He died there on 5 May 1821.

== The final journey ==
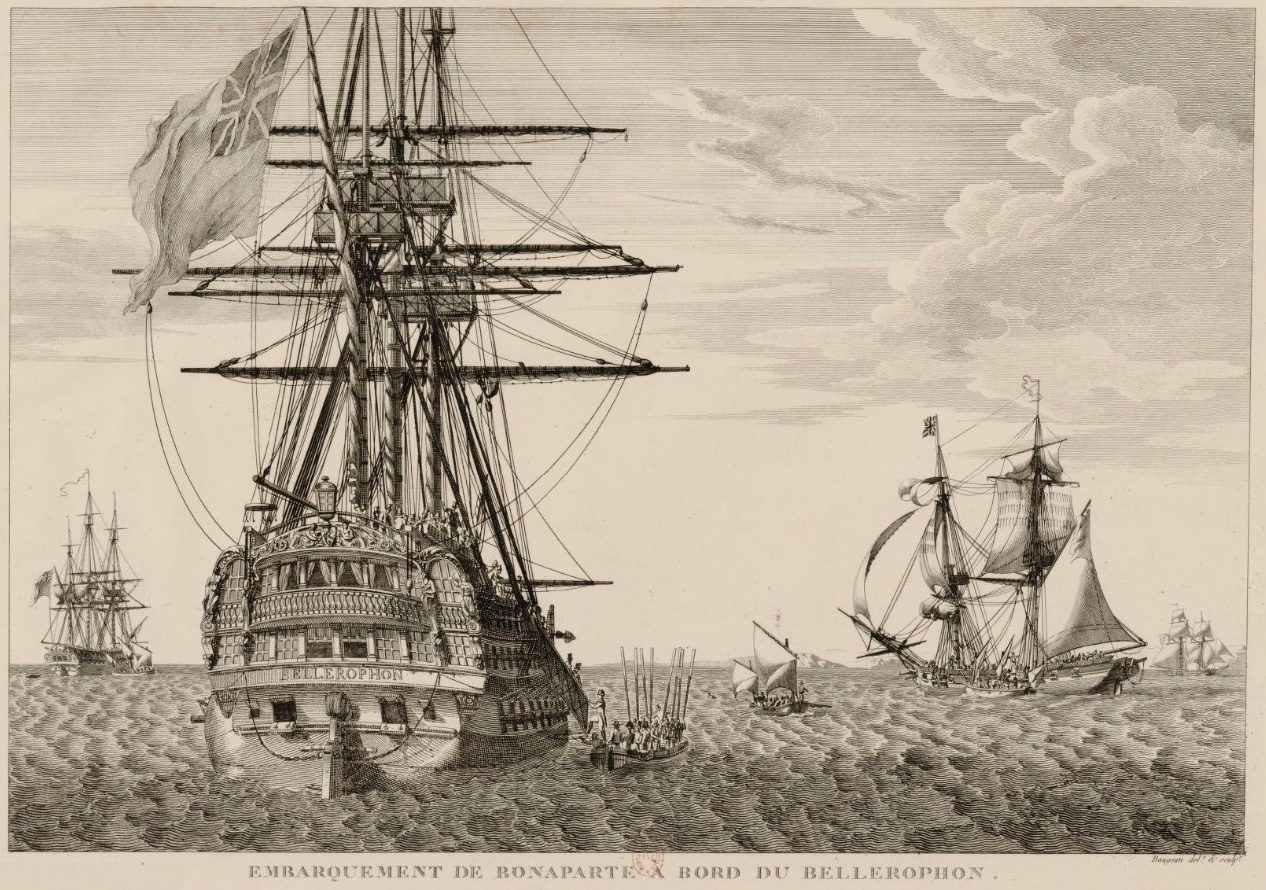
Napoleon boarding HMS Bellerophon

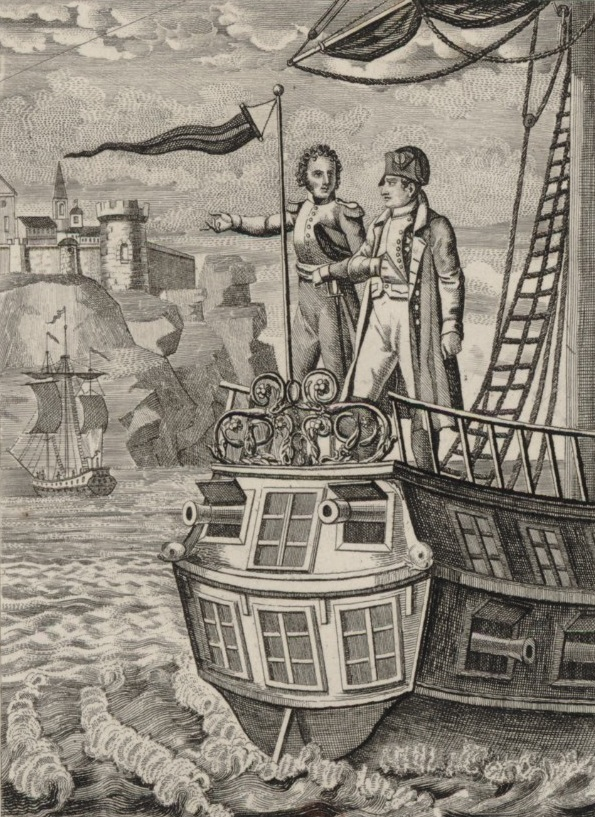
Bonaparte's arrival on Saint Helena Island, engraving by Louis-Yves Queverdo

Following his abdication on 22 June 1815, Napoleon proceeded to the Atlantic coast, where the French government, under the leadership of Fouché, had arranged for two frigates to facilitate his departure for America. However, the British squadron's blockade of the La Rochelle and Rochefort region effectively prevented him from leaving. On 15 July 1815, Napoleon surrendered to the British forces near the Île d'Aix and was subsequently transported to Torbay and then Plymouth on Britain's southwest coast aboard HMS Bellerophon. He assumed the British government would permit him to reside in the English countryside. Upon learning of his deportation to the island of Saint Helena on 31 July, Napoleon was transferred on 7 August 1815, to HMS Northumberland, which took him on a journey lasting two months and one week. (Note: Several witnesses have documented the journey, notably Emmanuel de Las Cases in The Memorial of Saint Helena and Denzil Ibbetson, the British commissary officer responsible for military supplies, who kept a journal that remained unpublished until it was put up for sale in late 2010.)

Saint Helena is a volcanic island situated 1,900 km (1,000 nmi) west of the African mainland in the South Atlantic Ocean. With a population of approximately 5,000 to 6,000, (Note: During Napoleon's exile, the island's population experienced a significant increase, reaching twice its original size. The Saint Helena garrison also underwent fluctuations, with numbers ranging between 1,500 and 2,000 men across different periods.) the island has only three access points to the sea. Its isolation and the steep black cliffs, which range from 200 to 300 metres in height, made it an easily monitorable and defensible location. The island was under the possession of the British East India Company rather than the British state, which had to lease it for this purpose. (Note: "A provisional transfer agreement was hastily concluded on 26 July 1815, between the Company and the London government. While the former retained the island’s 'commercial' management, its civil and military administration was transferred to the latter.")

On 15 October 1815, the Northumberland was anchored off Saint Helena. On the following day, Napoleon disembarked. Those in attendance included the Grand Marshal of the Palace, Henri Gratien Bertrand, and his wife Fanny; General Gourgaud; Emmanuel de Las Cases; General de Montholon and his wife Albine; Louis-Étienne Saint-Denis, also known as the Mameluke Ali; his maître d'hôtel Jean Baptiste Cipriani; his valet Marchand; and his usher Jean-Noël Santini. On 17 October, Napoleon took temporary residence at The Briars Pavilion, hosted by the Balcombe family, while awaiting the preparation of his permanent detention site at Longwood, which would take seven weeks. Longwood, situated on a plateau, allowed for easier surveillance but was constantly exposed to the ocean trade winds, often shrouded in fog and humidity, with sudden alternations between heavy rain and scorching sun. On 10 December 1815, Napoleon finally settled into his final residence under the supervision of the provisional governor, Admiral Cockburn.

== Solitude at Longwood ==
Custody of Napoleon Buonaparte Act 1816
- Act of Parliament
- Parliament of the United Kingdom
- Long title: An Act for the more effectually detaining in Custody Napoleon Buonaparté.
- Citation: 56 Geo. 3. c. 22
- Territorial extent: United Kingdom

Dates
- Royal assent: 11 April 1816
- Commencement: 11 April 1816 (Note: The Acts of Parliament (Commencement) Act 1793.)
- Repealed: 5 August 1873
Other legislation
| Repealed by | Statute Law Revision Act 1873 |
| Relates to | Intercourse with Saint Helena Act 1816 |

Status: Repealed

Text of statute as originally enacted

Intercourse with Saint Helena Act 1816
- Act of Parliament
- Parliament of the United Kingdom
- Long title: An Act for regulating the Intercourse with the Island of Saint Helena, during the time Napoleon Buonaparté shall be detained there; and for indemnifying persons in the cases therein mentioned.
- Citation: 56 Geo. 3. c. 23
- Territorial extent: United Kingdom

Dates
- Royal assent: 11 April 1816
- Commencement: 11 April 1816
- Repealed: 5 August 1873
Other legislation
| Repealed by | Statute Law Revision Act 1873 |
| Relates to | Custody of Napoleon Buonaparte Act 1816 |

Status: Repealed

Text of statute as originally enacted

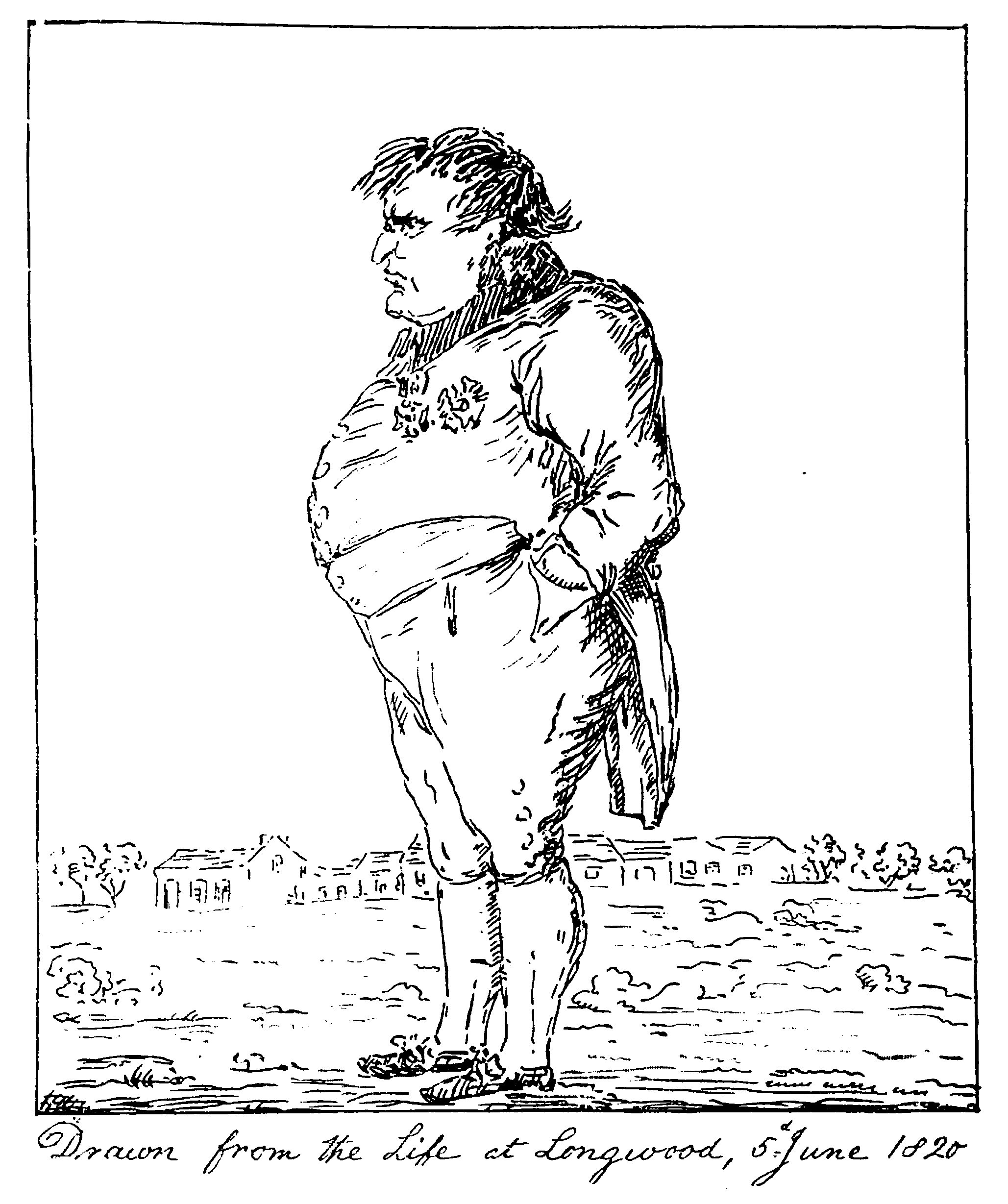
Anonymous, Fleshy (le ventripotent) life drawing of Napoleon at Longwood, 5 June 1820

On 10 December 1815, a modest dwelling resembling a farmhouse was installed at Longwood House. Napoleon was under constant surveillance. Initially, Napoleon anticipated that he would be treated as a distinguished guest. However, he soon realised that this was not the case and was subjected to numerous humiliations at the hands of Hudson Lowe, the new governor of the island, whom he first met on 17 April 1816. Tensions emerged between Napoleon and Lowe. According to instructions from the British government, Lowe declined to acknowledge Napoleon as an emperor or even as "General Bonaparte." Instead, he addressed him as Napoleon Bonaparte, deleting the "u" in Buonaparte, Napoleon's original name.

His weapons were confiscated, his correspondence was opened (which prompted the French to devise strategies and enlist accomplices to send uncensored letters), and his freedom of movement around the island was severely restricted. This forced exile intensified emotional distress and facilitated the emergence of disruptive behaviours among those who shared his circumstances, with the oppressive heat and humidity exacerbating the situation. The emperor reflected on his life and reign, dictating his memoirs to his companions in misfortune. Meanwhile, travellers stopping over at Saint Helena persistently sought authorisation from Napoleon's guards to catch a glimpse of the captive. On 18 July 1816, foreign commissioners arrived on the island, charged with reporting back to their respective courts on the situation. By the end of 1816, Emmanuel de Las Cases departed from Saint Helena (he would subsequently publish The Memorial of Saint Helena in 1823).

In the opening months of 1818, Gourgaud was compelled to take his leave of Longwood, having become estranged from Napoleon. Subsequently, in July 1819, his mistress, Madame de Montholon, returned to Europe with all her children. As Longwood gradually emptied, the atmosphere was full of anticipation and a pervasive sense of lethargy. In September 1819, a small cohort of new companions, predominantly Corsican individuals relocated from Italy by the Bonaparte family, arrived, briefly disrupting the prevailing monotony. However, the newcomers did not meet Napoleon's expectations or that of his other companions.

The factors of boredom, the curfew, and the unhealthy climate led Napoleon to gradually limit his walks, whether on foot, horseback, or by carriage. Subsequently, he relocated entirely to Longwood, where he enforced imperial etiquette and maintained a high standard of living, estimated at £19,000 per year. This was later reduced by half by the governor. He spent the majority of his time in his bedroom or bathroom, rather than in his study, contributing to his increasing obesity. Notwithstanding the circumstances, the former emperor clung to the possibility that a shift in the British government might facilitate his ability to reside in peace in England or join his brother Joseph in America. He was gratified by the support of the Whig Party, which regarded him as a successor to the Revolution. Furthermore, he was no longer perceived as a threat by the Holy Alliance. However, Napoleon's aspirations were dashed following the Congress of Aix-la-Chapelle in November 1818, when the Allies resolved to detain him on the island until his demise. Upon learning of this decision, his spirits plummeted.

== The death of Napoleon ==
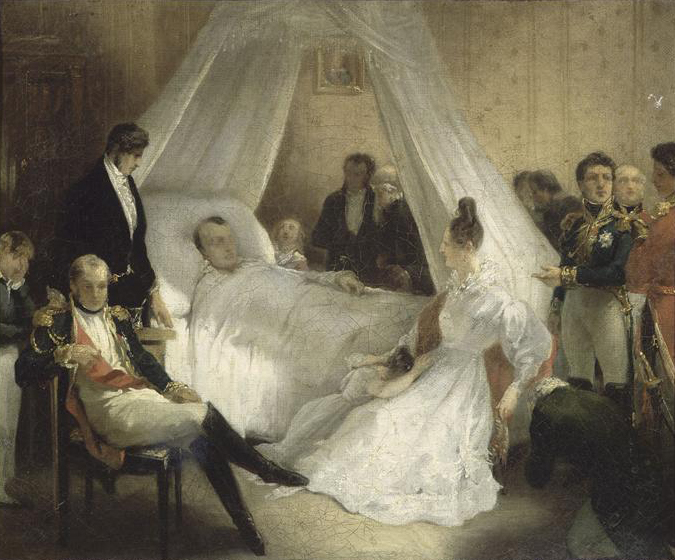
St. Helena – Death of Napoleon. Painting by Steuben

In his final years, Napoleon was largely inactive, though he retained a keen interest in his customary reading. He remained confined to Longwood for an extended period, spanning multiple months. His physician, François Antommarchi, recommended that he receive more fresh air, a suggestion that Napoleon disregarded due to his negative opinion of the doctor. He is quoted as saying, "One has the right to be ignorant, but not to lack heart." Antommarchi consulted with Hudson Lowe, who dismissed Napoleon's condition as merely a "diplomatic illness", despite the emperor's frequent complaints of sharp pain in his right side. Antommarchi diagnosed only simple constipation and prescribed a high dosage of calomel, a potent laxative that exacerbated Napoleon's existing gastric ulcer. On 11 April 1821, Napoleon, confined to bed, began dictating his will to General de Montholon. (Note: This document consists of three parts: The political will, featuring famous phrases like, "I desire that my ashes rest on the banks of the Seine, among the French people whom I have loved so much... I die prematurely, murdered by the English oligarchy and its hireling." The personal will, which allocates 7 million francs to his relatives and companions. Finally, nearly 204 million francs, according to an amount Napoleon estimated to have saved from his civil list—28 million per year, meant to be distributed to cities and all soldiers of the Grand Army. The royal government refused this, leading to numerous lawsuits filed by these heirs until 1857, when Napoleon III established the Saint Helena medal and a small pension for all of the Emperor's former comrades-in-arms.) He also added codicils related to events from his life that resurfaced in his memory. He continued until 27 April, after which he descended into agony. Suffering from a stomach ulcer, Napoleon refused assistance from British doctors. After eight days of agony, he died on 5 May 1821, at 5:49 p.m. His final words were reportedly "Army", "Head of the Army", or possibly "Josephine."

The autopsy, performed on 6 May 1821, has been the subject of considerable controversy ever since, due to the multiplicity of reports, both official and unofficial, including at least three distinct versions from Dr. Antommarchi alone.

Napoleon was interred on 9 May in the Valley of the Geranium, as per his final instructions, if his remains were not repatriated to Europe. His tomb was inscribed with no epithet, as Governor Lowe forbade any mention of either "Napoleon" or "Emperor Napoleon." Meanwhile, his death certificate, independently recorded in the parish register of St. James in Jamestown, the capital of Saint Helena, listed him on the same date as "Napoleon Buonaparte, late Emperor of France." (Note: There are two versions of Napoleon's death certificate: the original belongs to the St. Helena Archives archive and a later, more carefully written copy is shown on the British Library website in London archive.)

In 1840, at the behest of Louis-Philippe I and with the assent of the British, Napoleon's remains were repatriated to France by Prince de Joinville, the son of King Louis-Philippe. He now rests at Les Invalides. In 1940, the remains of Napoleon II, son of Napoleon I, were transferred to Les Invalides at the behest of Adolf Hitler. Longwood was ceded to France in 1858 by Queen Victoria under the rule of Napoleon III and is now part of the French domains on Saint Helena.

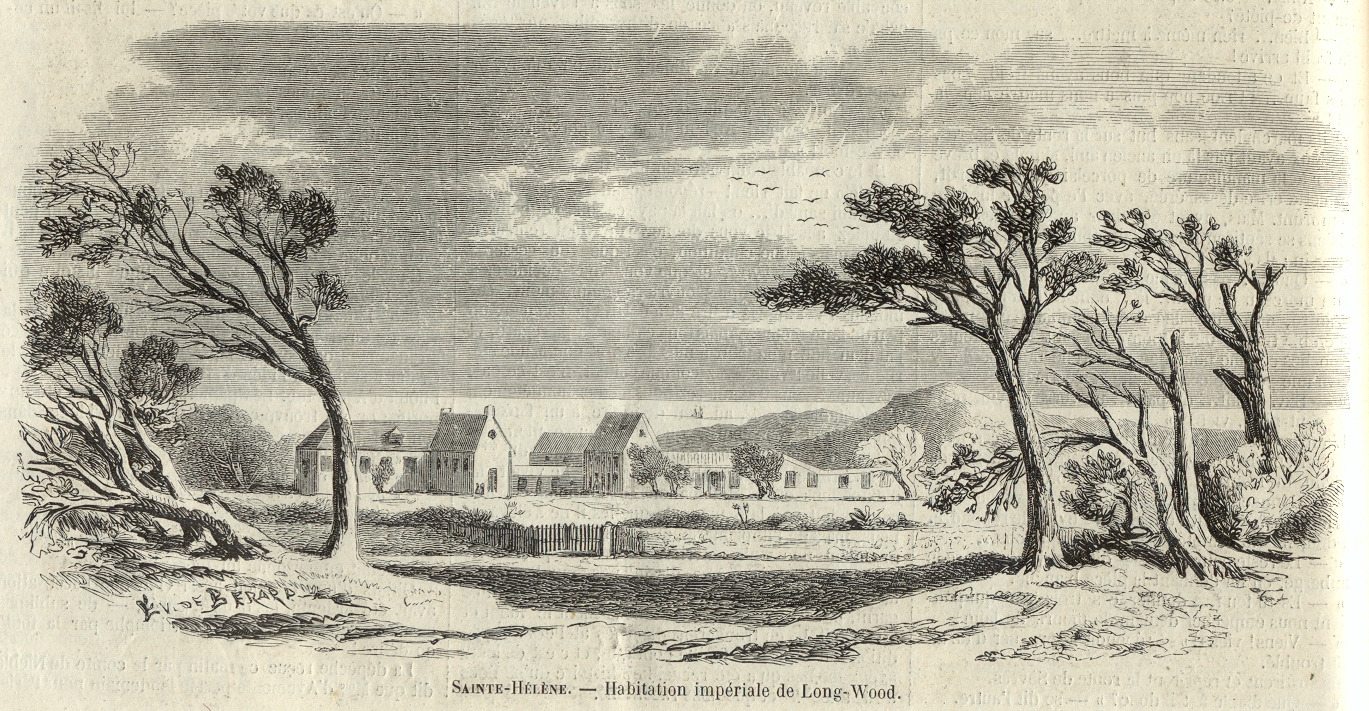
St. Helena – Imperial residence at Longwood in 1858

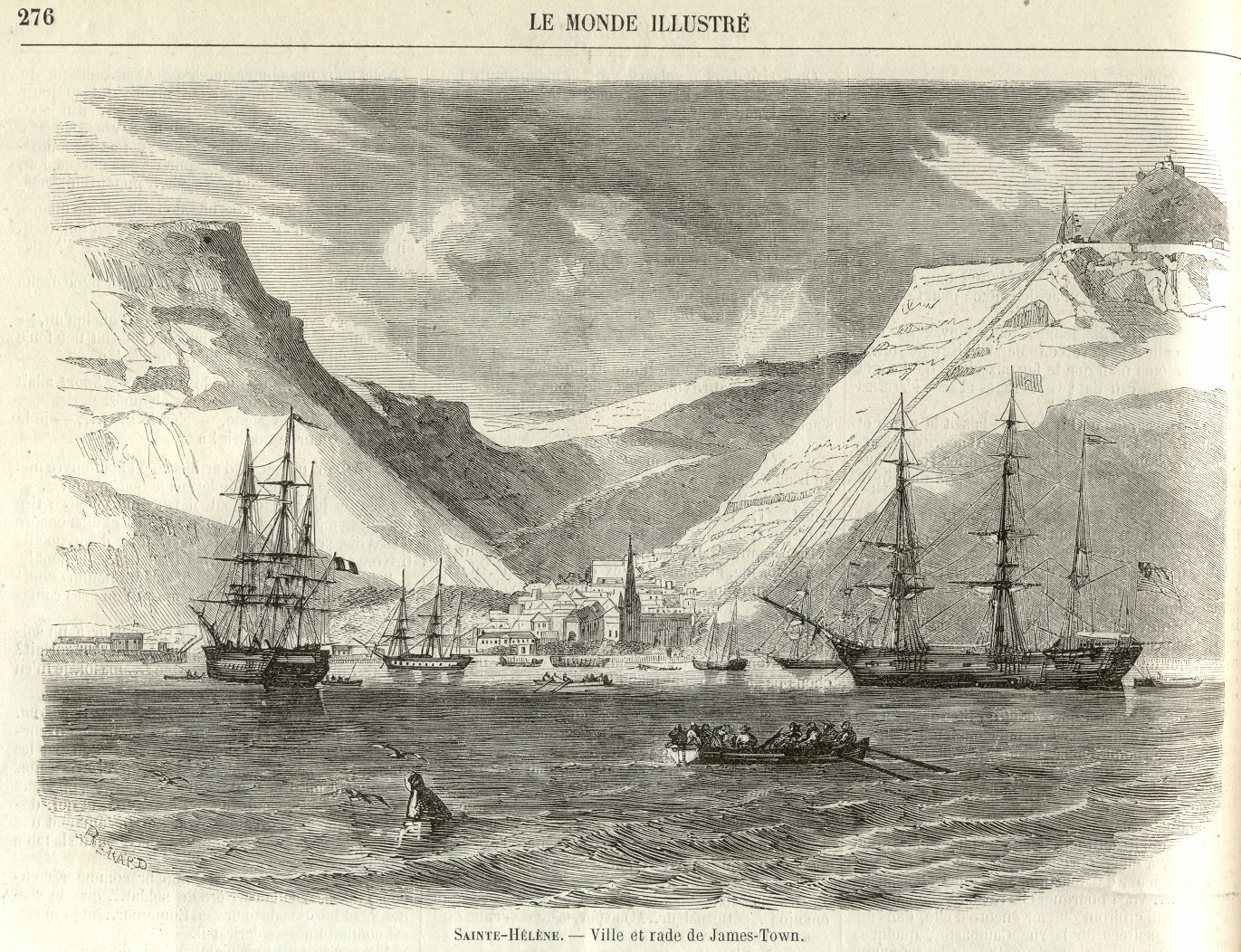
St. Helena – Jamestown Harbour

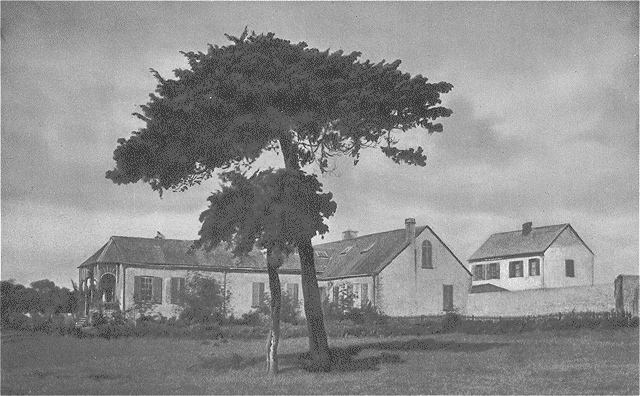
Longwood Old House in 1913

== Documentary ==
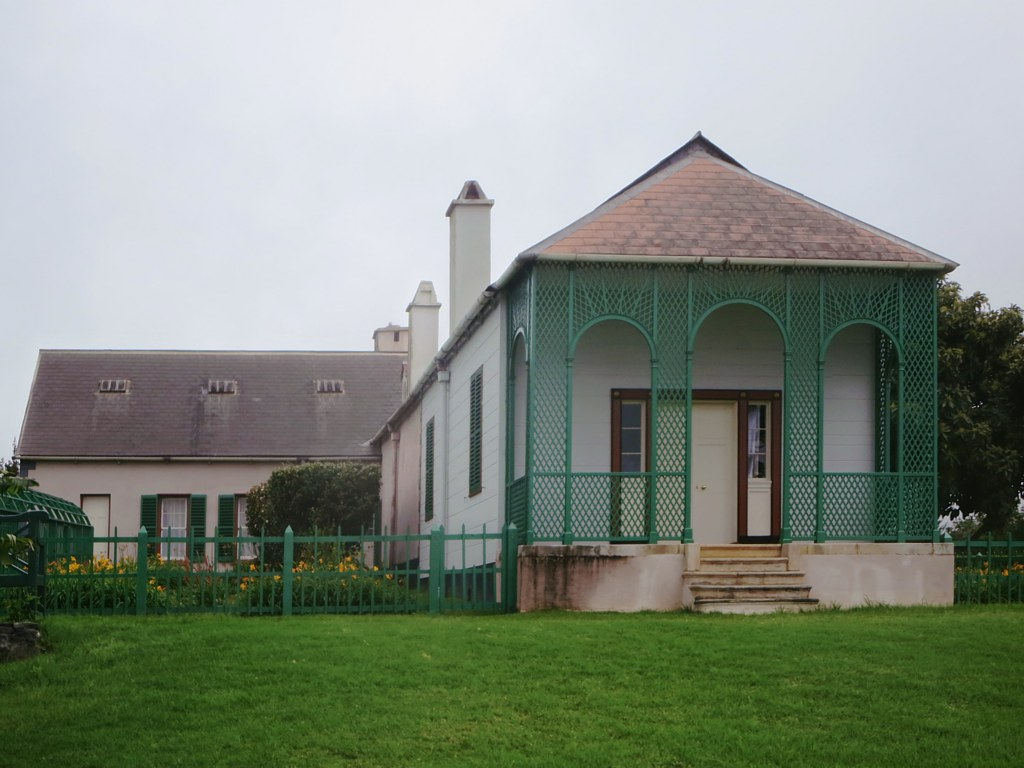
Longwood House in September 2014

A docu-drama, Napoléon, l'exilé de Sainte-Hélène is dedicated to Napoleon I's exile on Saint Helena. It is part of the Secrets d'Histoire programme, presented by Stéphane Bern.

The broadcast, which marked the bicentennial of Napoleon's death, was aired on France 3 on 19 April 2021.

== See also ==
- Napoleon I's first abdication

== Bibliography ==
- Tulard, Jean (1981). Napoléon à Sainte-Hélène [Napoleon on St. Helena] (in French). Bouquins.
- Ganière, Paul (1957). Napoléon à Sainte-Hélène [Napoleon on St. Helena] (in French). Amiot-Dumont.
- Martineau, Gilbert (1981). Napoléon à Sainte-Hélène 1815–1821 [Napoleon on St. Helena 1815–1821] (in French). Éditions Tallandier.
- Kauffmann, Jean-Paul (1997). La Chambre noire de Longwood [Longwood's Dark Room] (in French). Éditions de la Table ronde.
- Boudon, Jacques-Olivier (2000). Napoléon à Sainte-Hélène : de l'exil à la légende [Napoleon on St. Helena: from exile to legend] (in French). Éditions Fides.
- Chevallier, Bernard; Dancoisne-Martineau, Michel; Lentz, Thierry (2005). Napoléon à Sainte-Hélène : daSainte-Hélène. Île de mémoiree l'exil à la légende [Sainte-Hélène. Island of memory] (in French). Fayard. ISBN 978-2213626451.
- Dancoisne-Martineau, Michel (2011). Chroniques de Sainte-Hélène : Atlantique sud [Saint Helena Chronicles: South Atlantic] (in French). Perrin.
- Dumont, Hervé. Napoléon, l'épopée en 1000 films : Cinéma et Télévision de 1897 à 2015 [Napoleon, the epic in 1000 films: Cinema and Television from 1897 to 2015] (in French).
- Vial, Charles-Éloi (2018). Napoléon à Sainte-Hélène : l'encre de l'exil [Napoleon on St. Helena: the ink of exile] (in French). Paris: Perrin. ISBN 978-2-262-06680-2.
- Branda, Pierre (2021). Napoléon à Sainte-Hélène [Napoleon on St. Helena] (in French). Paris: Perrin. ISBN 978-2-262-06995-7.
- Jourquin, Jacques (2021). La dernière passion de Napoléon. La bibliothèque de Saint-Hélène [Napoleon's last passion. The Saint-Helena library] (in French). Passés / Composés. ISBN 978-2-379-33732-1.
- Unwin, Brian (2010). Terrible Exile: The Last Days of Napoleon on St Helena. London: I.B. Tauris. ISBN 978-1-84885-287-7.

=== Filmography ===
In his study of representations of the emperor on screen, Hervé Dumont notes that directors of films dealing with this period are fascinated by the ruler's twilight, employing either an adequate or a freer vision. The majority of cinematic productions, including those in the English language, portray Hudson Lowe in a negative light.

- Napoléon à Sainte-Hélène (Napoleone a Sant'Elena) by Mario Caserini (1911)
- Le Mémorial de Sainte-Hélène ou La Captivité de Napoléon by Michel Carré and Jules Barbier (1911)
- The Prisoner of War (Napoleon on the Island of St. Helena) by J. Searle Dawley (1912)
- The Agony of the Eagles by Dominique Bertinotti and Julien Duvivier, uncredited (1920–1921)
- Napoleon at Saint Helena or La Fin de Napoléon à Sainte-Hélène (Napoleon auf St. Helena ou Der Gefangene Kaiser) by Lupu Pick (1929). The film is based on Abel Gance's screenplay for his ambitious Napoleon fresco, of which only one film was ever made.
- The Man on the Rock de Edward L. Cahn (1938). This short film analyses a possible plot that the emperor did not die in exile.
- Sant'Elena, piccola isola by Umberto Scarpelli and Renato Simoni (1943)
- La Caméra explore le temps, episode Le Drame de Saint-Hélène by Guy Lessertisseur (1961).
- Eagle in a Cage by Fielder Cook (1971). Remake of a 1965 TV movie, many elements are not faithful to historical reality.
- Napoleone a Sant'Elena by Vittorio Cottafavi (1973)
- Betzi by Claude Harold Whatham (1978)
- The Hostage of Europe (Jeniec Europy) by Jerzy Kawalerowicz (1989)
- The Emperor's New Clothes by Alan Taylor (2001). The plot follows an uchronistic vision.
- Monsieur N. by Antoine de Caunes (2003)

Exile is also addressed in Sacha Guitry's Napoléon (1955) and Yves Simoneau's Napoléon (2002). Several unfinished film projects focused specifically on exile: Charles Chaplin's Return from St. Helena (1937), André Berthomieu's Saint-Hélène (1939), Jean Delannoy's Napoléon à Saint-Hélène (1960), Julien Duvivier's Sainte-Hélène (1961) and Patrice Chéreau's The Master of Longwood or Betsy et l'empereur (2009).

=== Documentaries ===
- Adt, Dominique (2024). Napoléon à Sainte-Hélène : le dernier acte [Napoleon on St. Helena: the final act] (Documentary) (in French). Science grand format. Archived from the original on 14 May 2024.
