= Hélène Napoleone de Montholon =

Reputed illegitimate daughter of Napoleon

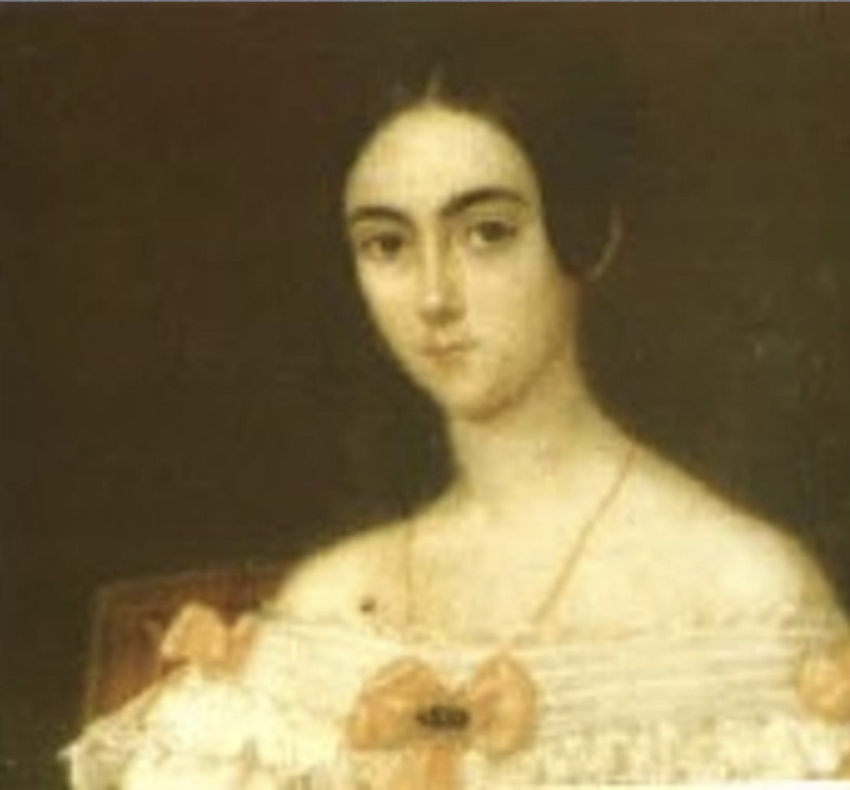
Hélène Napoleone de Montholon (18 June 1816 – c. 16 January 1907)

Hélène Napoleone de Montholon (18 June 1816 – c. 16 January 1907) was the reputed daughter of Napoleon by Albine de Montholon, wife of Charles Tristan, marquis de Montholon, and sister (or half-sister) of Charles-François-Frédéric, marquis de Montholon-Sémonville.

She was born Napoléone Marie Hélène de Montholon-Sémonville in Saint Helena while Albine and Montholon were with Napoleon in exile there. Although Napoleon never acknowledged Hélène as his child, he gave her the name "Napoleone" after himself. Additionally, he was very close with the Montholon family, notably Albine, which has led some authors to conclude that Napoleon kept Albine as his mistress. Little is known of Hélène Napoleone's life after she left Saint Helena, although she later became Countess of Lapérouse (alternatively Lapeyrouse), due to her marriage to Léonard Léonce Rochon de Lapérouse.
