= Charles-François-Frédéric, marquis de Montholon-Sémonville =

Charles-François-Frédéric de Montholon-Sémonville Marquis de Montholon-Sémonville

French Ambassador to the United States
- In office 1864–1866
- President: Abraham Lincoln; Andrew Johnson
- Preceded by: Henri Mercier
- Succeeded by: Jules Berthemy

Personal details
- Born: 14 November 1814; Paris, France
- Died: 20 April 1886 (aged 71)
- Spouse: Marie Victoire Gratiot (after 1837)
- Relations: Hélène Napoleone Bonaparte (sister)
- Children: 4
- Parents: Charles Tristan, marquis de Montholon (father); Albine de Montholon (mother)

Charles François Frédéric de Montholon-Sémonville (27 November 1814 – 20 April 1886) was a French senator, diplomat, and French ambassador to the United States from 1864 to 1866.

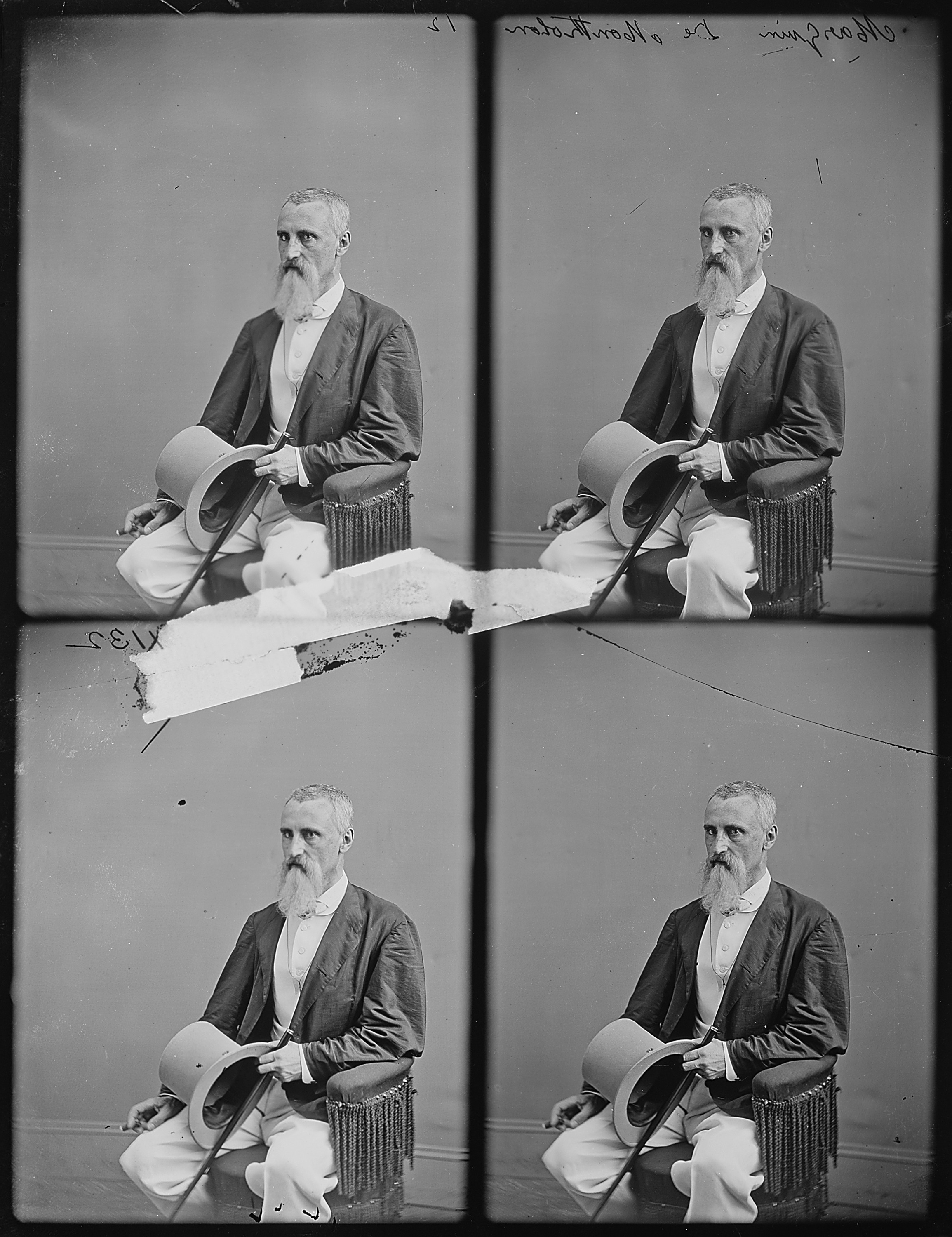
Marquis de Montholon-Sémonville, 1864-66

== Early life ==
Charles-François-Frédéric was born on 27 November 1814 in Paris. He was the son of Hélène Albine de Vassal and General Charles Tristan, marquis de Montholon, his mother's third husband. While married to her second husband, Albine had two sons, Tristan Charles François Napoléon and Napoléon Charles Tristan, both of whom had "de Montholon-Sémonville" as surnames likely because both were fathered by Montholon before they married in 1812. His two other siblings were Hélène, who was reported to have been fathered by Napoleon while Albine and Montholon were with him during his exile on Saint Helena; and Charles-Jean-Tristan, who was born to Montholon's mistress, Catherine O'Hara; they married after Albine's death.

== Career ==
From 30 July 1853 to 10 December 1853, he was Consul-General and charge d'affaires in Lima, the capital and largest city of Peru. During the French intervention in Mexico, he was ambassador of Napoleon III to Maximilian I. From 1864 to 1866, he was ambassador of Napoleon III to the Government of Andrew Johnson. He had previously served as First Secretary of the French Legation under Charles Edward Pontois during the Tyler administration. In the plebiscite of 1870, he was elected senator.

== Personal life ==
On 1 November 1837, he married the American heiress, Marie Victoire Gratiot (1820–1878) in Washington, D.C. Marie was a daughter of Brev. Brig.-Gen. Charles Gratiot and a granddaughter of Charles Gratiot Sr., a fur trader during the American Revolution, and Victoire Chouteau (who was from an important mercantile family). Together, Marie Victoire and Charles-François-Frédéric had four children:

- Anne Albine Yolande de Montholon-Sémonville (1838–1875), who married and had issue.
- Yolande Marie Victoire de Montholon-Sémonville (1840–1841), who died young.
- Gratiot-Adolphe-Charles-Tristan de Montholon-Sémonville (1841–1892), who married and had issue.
- Julie Hélène de Montholon-Sémonville (1844–1929), who married Nicolas Garcin, aide-de-camp to Ernest Courtot de Cissey in a wedding attended by Emperor Maximilian, Empress Carlota, and François Achille Bazaine.

The marquis de Montholon-Sémonville died on 20 April 1886. He was succeeded in the marquisate by his son Gratiot-Adolphe-Charles-Tristan. His widow died in France in 1878.
