= Monsieur N. =

2003 British-French film by Antoine de Caunes

- French film release poster
- Directed by: Antoine de Caunes
- Written by: René Manzor
- Produced by: Pierre Kubel
- Starring: Philippe Torreton; Richard E. Grant; Elsa Zylberstein
- Narrated by: François Marthouret
- Cinematography: Pierre Aïm
- Edited by: Joële Van Effenterre
- Music by: Stephan Eicher
- Production companies: StudioCanal; Reeleyes Film; Scion Films; Futur Film Group; Canal+ France Télévision Images 2 France 3 Cinéma; Studio Images 9
- Distributed by: Mars Distribution (France); Redbus Film Distribution (United Kingdom)
- Release date: 12 February 2003
- Running time: 120 min.
- Countries: France; United Kingdom
- Languages: French; English; Corsican
- Budget: $17 million
- Box office: $860.094

Monsieur N. is a 2003 historical mystery film directed by Antoine de Caunes. An international co-production of the United Kingdom and France, the film tells the story of the last years of the life of the Emperor Napoleon (played by Philippe Torreton), who was imprisoned by the British on St Helena.

== Plot ==
The film centers around the final years of Napoleon Bonaparte (Philippe Torreton) during his forced exile on the remote island of Saint Helena in the middle of the South Atlantic Ocean, while being under the watchful eye of the inflexible and petty British governor, Sir Hudson Lowe (Richard E. Grant). Far from being a straightforward historical account, the plot unfolds as a retrospective investigation through the eyes of the young, liberal, Lieutenant Basil Heathcote (Jay Rodan), a British officer stationed on the island who develops a growing fascination with the captive emperor.

Napoleon dreams of how to escape from his captivity and how he views his time in Saint Helena as his "last battle". Meanwhile, Heathcote, torn between his duty and his admiration for the imprisoned emperor, witnesses Lowe's suffocating surveillance, a complex web of intrigue around Napoleon's entourage, and the almost symbiotic relationship between him and his loyal Corsican servant, Cipriani. He also witnesses the unexpected bond that develops between the emperor and the young Betsy Balcombe, the daughter of an English merchant whom befriended the famous prisoner—a relationship that Lowe observes with particular animosity. When Napoleon officially dies in 1821, Heathcote begins to uncover anomalies that raise doubts: is the buried body truly that of the emperor?

The film puts forward the conspiratorial theory that Napoleon did not die on Saint Helena but escaped thanks to an elaborate plan, with the help of British sympathizers and even Betsy herself. The key would be Cipriani, who, out of devotion, would have taken the place of his emperor, dying in his name. Years later, during the return of the remains to France in 1840, an older Heathcote, now promoted to Colonel, consumed by the secret, confronts the ultimate truth about Napoleon's whereabouts and the price of absolute loyalty.

The ending reveals, through the memories and obsession of Heathcote to learn about the truth, that the emperor may have managed to reach Louisiana, where he lived away from European scrutiny, and married Betsy Balcombe, started a family, and led a peaceful existence until his natural death in peace, far removed from military glory and power. Finally at peace with himself, he decides to preserve the mystery as a final act of loyalty to the man he knew, walking away with the conviction that some truths are better left in silence so that the legend may endure.

== Reception ==
The film was well received. As of July 2020, 71% of the 21 reviews compiled by Rotten Tomatoes are positive, with an average rating of 6.27/10. The website's critics' consensus reads: "Fueled by performances as polished as its visuals, Monsieur N. is a flawed yet largely absorbing look at an imagined chapter of Napoleon's exile."

The film received a positive but guarded review in The New York Times, which praised Philippe Torreton's performance but thought the narrative too complex for an audience not initiated in Napoléon's history.

== Cast ==
- Philippe Torreton as Napoléon Bonaparte
- Richard E. Grant as Hudson Lowe
- Jay Rodan as Basil Heathcote, Lowe's aide-de-camp; a fictional character
- Elsa Zylberstein as Albine de Montholon
- Roschdy Zem as Marshal Bertrand
- Bruno Putzulu as Cipriani
- Stéphane Freiss as Gen. Montholon
- Frédéric Pierrot as Gen. Gourgaud
- Siobhan Hewlett as Betsy Balcombe
- Richard Heffer as Monsieur Balcombe
- Peter Sullivan as Thomas Reade
- Stanley Townsend as Dr. O'Meara
- Igor Skreblin as Ali
- Blanche de Saint-Phalle as Fanny Bertrand
- Jake Nightingale as a carpenter
- Bernard Bloch as Von Holgendorp
- Bradley Geldenhuys as a soldier
