= Charles Gratiot =

United States Army officer

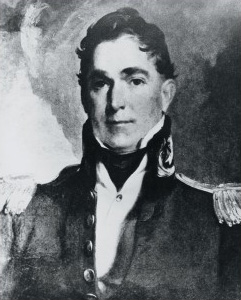
- Charles Gratiot by Thomas Sully in the West Point Museum Art Collection, U.S. Military Academy
- Born: Charles Chouteau Gratiot; August 29, 1786; St. Louis, Spanish Upper Louisiana Territory, present-day State of Missouri
- Died: May 18, 1855 (aged 68); St. Louis, Missouri, US
- Burial place: Calvary Cemetery, St. Louis, Missouri
- Spouse: Ann Belin
- Children: Mary Victoria Gratiot; Julia Augusta Gratiot
- Military career
- Allegiance: United States
- Branch: United States Army
- Service years: 1806–1838
- Rank: Colonel; Brevet Brigadier General
- Unit: U.S. Army Corps of Engineers
- Commands: Chief of Engineers
- Conflicts: Battle of Mackinac Island, 1814, during War of 1812

Charles Chouteau Gratiot (August 29, 1786 – May 18, 1855) was born in St. Louis, Spanish Upper Louisiana Territory, now the present-day State of Missouri. He was the son of Charles Gratiot, Sr., a fur trader in the Illinois country during the American Revolution, and Victoire Chouteau, who was from an important mercantile family. His father became a wealthy merchant, during the early years of St. Louis. After 1796, Charles was raised in the large stone house purchased by his father in St. Louis, near the Mississippi River. He made a career out of being a U.S. Army military engineer, becoming the Chief Engineer of the United States Corps of Engineers, and supervised construction of a number of important projects. He was dismissed by Martin Van Buren, which led to a protracted controversy.

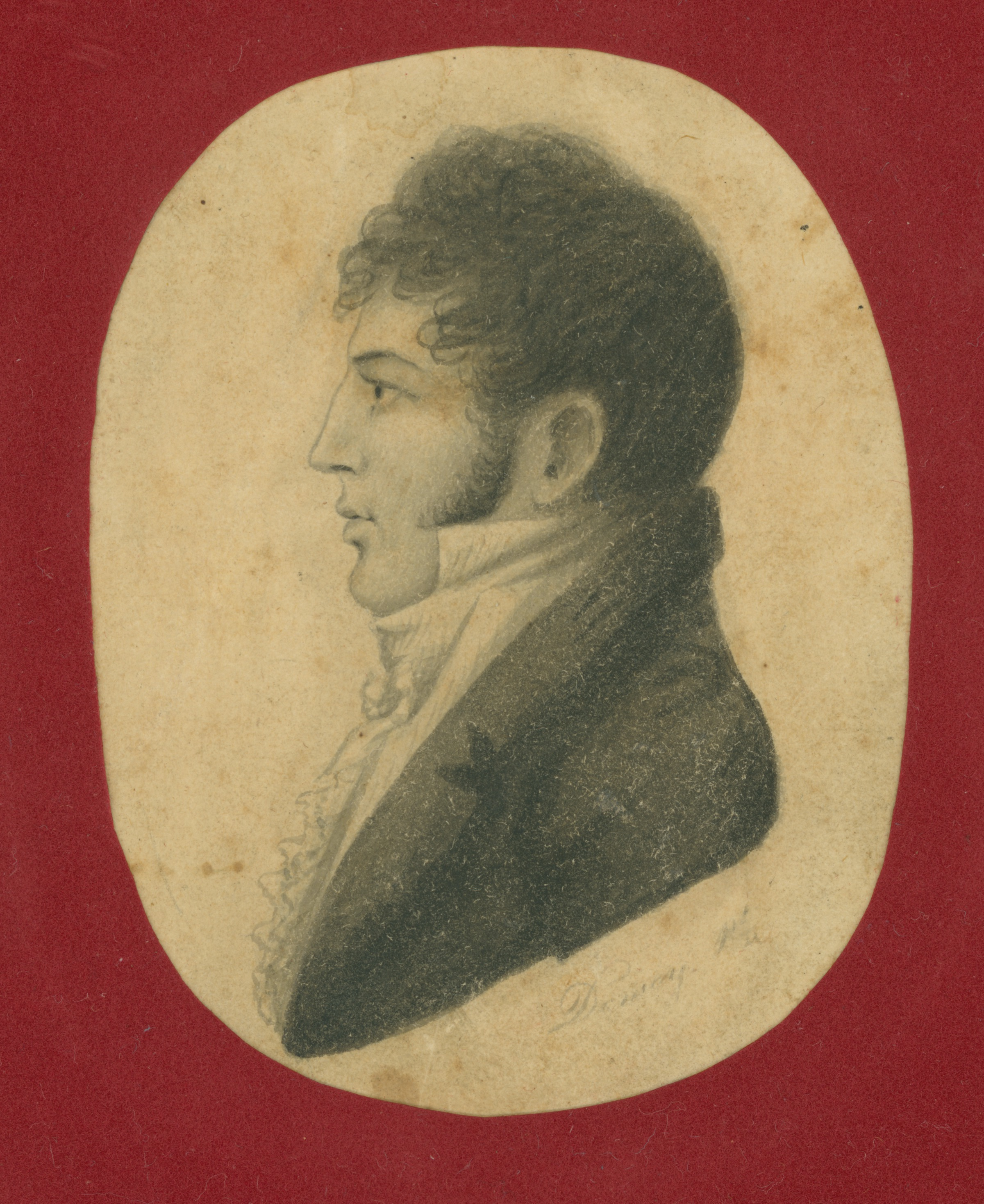
Portrait of Charles Gratiot

== Military career ==
President Thomas Jefferson personally appointed him (and 3 other young Missouri men) as a United States Military Academy cadet in July 1804. The U.S. Military Academy at West Point, New York, was the first school of engineering in the United States and graduated its first class in 1802. Gratiot was a member of the Class of 1806, the fourth graduating class, and was commissioned in the Corps of Engineers. He became a captain in 1808 and assisted Alexander Macomb in constructing fortifications in Charleston, South Carolina. He returned to his alma mater in 1810 to be commander of the Army garrison at West Point during 1810–1811.

As General William Henry Harrison's Chief Engineer in the War of 1812, he distinguished himself by planning and building Fort Meigs in 1813. He also rebuilt Fort St. Joseph, later renamed Fort Gratiot in his honor. In 1814 he took part in the attack of the Battle of Mackinac Island. He received the Thanks of Congress for his efforts during the war.

He served as chief engineer, 1817–1818, in Michigan Territory followed by assignment as the superintending engineer, 1819–1828, for the construction of defenses at Hampton Roads, Virginia. (Note: "He was superintending engineer of the construction of the defenses of Hampton Roads, 1819–1829. He became chief engineer of the army in May, 1828 and was brevetted brigadier. On the pretext of discrepancies in Gratiot's accounts, he was dismissed from the army in 1838. Thereafter, he worked as a clerk in the General Land Office in Washington. Lee was much shaken by Gratiot's dismissal and studied the matter closely. He came to the conclusion that Gratiot was an honest man, the victim of a cabal. See George W. Cullum, Biographical Register of the Officers and Graduates of the U.S. Military Academy at West Point (New York, 1868, 2 vols.), 1, 99–100. See also Douglas S. Freeman, R. E. Lee: A Biography (New York, 1934–1935, 4 vols.), 1, 157–158.")

== Chief of Engineers ==
On May 24, 1828, Gratiot was appointed colonel of engineers, brevet brigadier general, and Chief Engineer. For ten years he administered an expanding program of river, harbor, road, and fortification construction. He also engaged in a lengthy dispute with War Department officials over benefits, and in 1838 President Martin Van Buren dismissed him for failing to repay government funds that had been entrusted to him.

Prior to Gratiot's dismissal, he assigned Robert E. Lee to build wing dams in the Mississippi River at St. Louis, Missouri.

== Late life ==
Gratiot became a clerk in the United States General Land Office from 1840–1855 and died in St. Louis.

Gratiot became a party to lengthy litigation against the United States government, in cases that were appealed twice to the U.S. Supreme Court. It is said that the General of the Army, Alexander Macomb, was of the opinion that President Van Buren's actions were too harsh.

== Family ==
He married Ann Belin on April 22, 1819. They had two children:

- Marie Victoire Gratiot (1820–1878). Married Charles-François-Frédéric, marquis de Montholon-Sémonville. Had issue.
- Julia Augusta Gratiot (1824–1895). Married Charles Pierre Chouteau. Had issue.

== Death and legacy, tributes and memorials ==
- His remains are interred in section 13 of Calvary Cemetery in St. Louis, Missouri.
- Fort Gratiot, Michigan, was named after Gratiot, who oversaw its reconstruction in 1814 to guard the mouth of the St. Clair River at Lake Huron. Fort Gratiot Park is located there.
- Gratiot Avenue, an early roadway between Detroit and Port Huron, Michigan, was named for the fort near Port Huron, which was in turn named for Gratiot. Construction started in Detroit in 1829, and the roadway was completed in the same year to Mount Clemens. The rest was finished in 1833. Sections of the roadway are designated as state highways M-3 or M-19, and before I-94 was built, Gratiot Avenue was the main link between the two cities.
- Gratiot is the namesake of the village of Gratiot, Ohio.
- Point Gratiot, Point Gratiot Light (a/k/a Dunkirk Lighthouse) and Point Gratiot Park in Dunkirk, New York are also named for him.
- Gratiot County, Michigan is named for Gratiot. It was described by the Territorial Legislature in 1831. By 1837, the Territory had been admitted to the Union as a state; in 1855 the State Legislature authorized the organization of Gratiot County—the death year of the county's namesake.

== See also ==
- List of Michigan county name etymologies

Military offices
Preceded by Alexander Macomb	Chief of Engineers; 1828–1838	Succeeded by Joseph Gilbert Totten
