= Sten Forshufvud =

Sten Gabriel Bernhard Forshufvud (9 February 1903 – 25 June 1985) was a Swedish dentist and physician, and amateur toxicologist (expert on poisons) who formulated and supported the controversial theory that Napoleon was assassinated by a member of his entourage while in exile. He wrote a book, in Swedish, about this in 1961, which was translated the following year as Who Killed Napoleon? He later published his ideas in English in the 1983 book Assassination At St. Helena: The Poisoning Of Napoleon Bonaparte, written in collaboration with Ben Weider, co-author (with David Hapgood) of the 1982 book The Murder Of Napoleon, which also advanced Forshufvud's theories.

== Early life ==
Forshufvud was born in Ramsele, Sweden and was the son of district medical officer Oscar Bengtsson and Eva Melin. He passed his studentexamen in Uddevalla in 1921 and passed his dental exam in 1924 and was active as a dental surgeon at the University of Bordeaux in 1934. Once back to Sweden, he carried on his studies in Biology at Lund University, where he conducted the research for his Ph.D. thesis in Medicine; this he published in 1941. Forshufvud received his doctor of odontology degree in 1949.

== Forensic investigation of Napoleon's death ==
=== Experimentation ===
Forshufvud tested five of Napoleon's hairs with Ben Weider for traces of arsenic. They found fluctuations of arsenic levels ranging from normal to 38 times greater than average. This would purportedly suggest that Napoleon was given arsenic in different concentrations at different times for almost five years prior to his death.

=== Controversy ===
Forshufvud's findings have been disputed since the hairs that were tested have never been decisively dated, or even proven to be Napoleon's. However, all of the hair samples that Forshufvud had tested by an independent laboratory were family heirlooms that were handed down through generations. Plus all the samples were very similar. These hair samples were supposedly given to members of Napoleon's staff and others he favored. Several samples of these hairs did not pass through Forshufvud's hands and were sent directly to the testing laboratory in Scotland. All supported Forshufvud's theory.

=== Postulations ===
Forshufvud and Weider suggested that their theory that Napoleon was assassinated by a Frenchman who served on Napoleon's staff during his exile (their most likely suspect being Montholon) was repugnant to the French people, who now honor Napoleon as one of France's great heroes. As a result, they understood that their "proof of poisoning" would always be questioned or ridiculed by those serving France.

== Personal life and death ==
In his first marriage, in 1925, he married Karin Thorsell. In his second marriage, in 1950, he married Ulla-Britta Björkman (born 1925), the daughter of merchant Picco Björkman and Elsa Carlstedt. He was the father of Gull (born 1926), Ragnar (born 1931), Lennart (born 1951), Roland (born 1954) and Rickard (born 1957). Forshufvud died on 25 June 1985 in Gothenburg, Sweden. He is buried at Stampen Cemetery in Gothenburg.
