= Albine de Montholon =

French noblewoman (1779–1848)

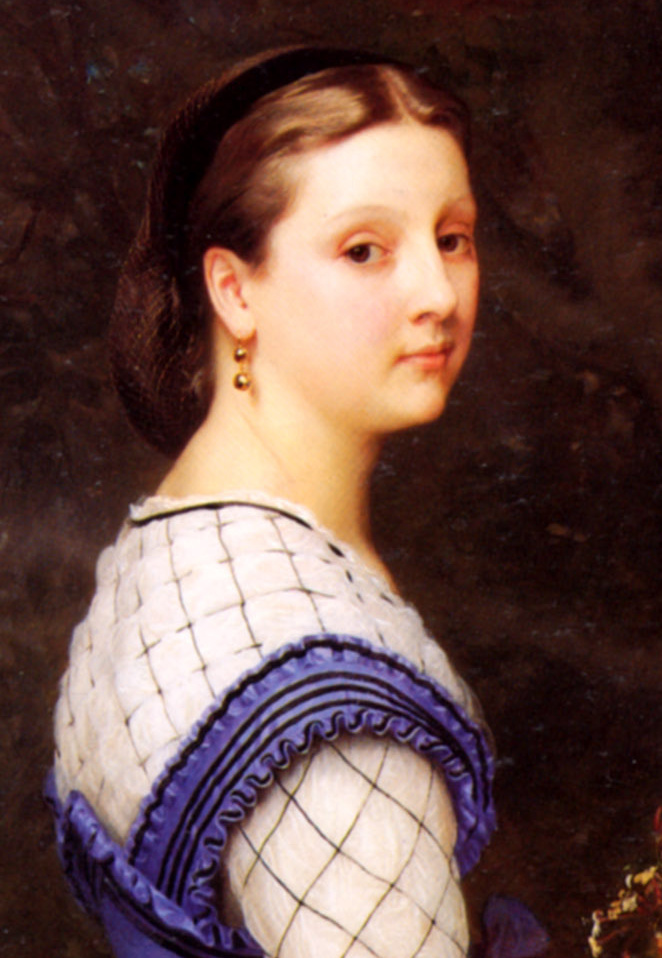
Albine de Montholon

Albine de Montholon (18 December 1779 - 25 March 1848) was a French noblewoman, and the wife of Charles Tristan, marquis de Montholon. She was reputed to be the mistress of Napoleon during his exile on Saint Helena.

== Life ==
She was born Albine Hélène de Vassal in Paris. Her cousin was Régis de Cambacérès. On 19 February 1797, at age 17, she married Jean-Pierre Bignon; they divorced in 1799. On 18 August 1800, at age 20, she married Daniel Roger. In December 1809, she gave birth to a son, Tristan Charles François Napoléon de Montholon-Sémonville. A second son, Napoléon Charles Tristan de Montholon-Sémonville, was born on 3 October 1810. Both sons being named "Charles", "Tristan", and "de Montholon-Sémonville" suggests they were fathered by Montholon before Albine married him on 2 July 1812, two months after divorcing Roger. She gave birth to her third son, Charles-François-Frédéric, in 1814.

She gave birth to her fourth child, Hélène Napoleone Bonaparte in 1816 on Saint Helena. As she was involved at the time with both Montholon and Napoleon, it is unknown which man fathered Hélène.

After the departure of Emmanuel de Las Cases from Saint Helena in December 1816, Albine sometimes acted as a secretary to Napoleon, taking down his recollections from dictation. Her increasing access to Napoleon was noticed by General Gaspard Gourgaud, whose jealousy contributed to tensions within Napoleon's household.

Shortly after Albine died in Montpellier, Montholon married his mistress, Catherine O'Hara, mother of his son, Charles Jean Tristan.

Albine was played by Elsa Zylberstein in Monsieur N..
