= Secrets d'Histoire =

French historical television program

- Genre: Historical documentary
- Created by: Vanessa Pontet (Editor-in-Chief from 2010 to 2017); Baptiste Mathon (current Editor-in-Chief)
- Showrunners: Stéphane Bern, Isabelle Benhadj (voice-over)
- Country of origin: France
- No. of seasons: 19
- No. of episodes: 190

Production
- Producer: Jean-Louis Remilleux

Original release
- Network: France 2
- Release: 30 September 2007 – 2019
- Network: France 3
- Release: 2019 – present

Secrets d'Histoire is a historical television program presented by Stéphane Bern.

Each episode retraces the life of a major historical figure, and highlights highly emblematic sites in France and other major countries.

It was broadcast on France 2 from 2007 to 2019, and on France 3 from 2019.

Journalist and producer Jean-Louis Remilleux came up with the original idea for the program.

== History ==
=== A tricky start (2007–2011) ===
Secrets d'Histoire was broadcast for the first time on France 2 on September 30, 2007.

At the time of the show's launch, the channel indicated that its aim was to introduce viewers to famous historical figures, but also to decipher some of history's unexplained, and sometimes inexplicable, mysteries.

The first issue is devoted to the death of Emperor Napoleon I, and the theories that have circulated concerning his possible poisoning.

For the first two seasons, the program was broadcast on Sunday afternoons on France 2. Each issue featured a variety of reports, interspersed with on-stage debates with various specialists, including historians, writers, and researchers.

In July 2008, the channel's management decided to discontinue the show. Stéphane Bern stated at the time that he had denounced "France Télévisions' lack of editorial audacity when it came to culture and heritage". Thanks to good ratings and "the mobilization of viewers on the France 2 website", the show continued throughout the summer of 2008. During this period, four new hour-and-a-half episodes were broadcast in the first half of the evening.

In September 2008, however, the program was dropped from the schedule to make way for L'Objet du scandale, presented by Guillaume Durand. In 2009 and 2010, the show returned to the broadcast schedule, but only in August for a few hour-and-a-half episodes in the first half of the evening.

In the summer of 2011, France 2 broadcast seven new episodes in the first half of the evening. In the same year, the show's editorial line evolved: "This season, we've taken a new turn with the issue devoted to Claude Monet, which will be broadcast on August 30. I'm also thinking of devoting one to Victor Hugo. In short, Secrets d'Histoire will open up to artists whose dimension is not only cultural," explains Stéphane Bern.

At the same time, the show's audience has grown from an average of three million viewers in 2008 to 3.6 million in summer 2011.

=== Increasing success (2012–2018) ===
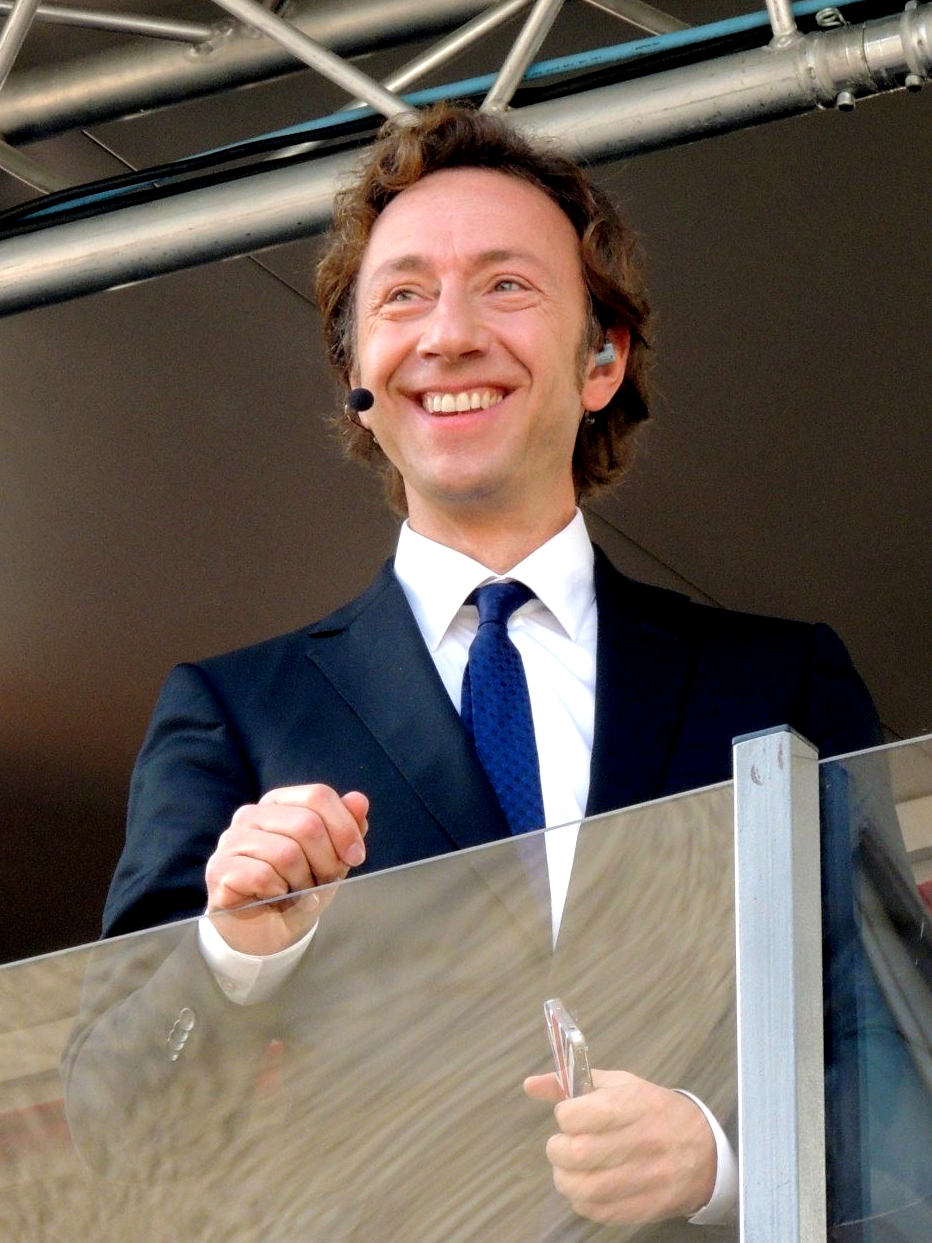
French host Stéphane Bern has presented the show since its inception.

In the summer of 2012, France 2 broadcast ten new episodes in the first half of the evening, several of which met with notable success. The episode devoted to Louis XIV, entitled Louis XIV, les passions du Roi Soleil (Louis XIV, the passions of the Sun King), set a new audience record, with nearly five million viewers and a 21.2% audience share. This was the best audience in the show's history.

From 2014 onwards, the show was broadcast more randomly and on varying days of the week (either Tuesdays or Thursdays). In an interview with Le Figaro, Stéphane Bern explains that he was unhappy at the time, regretting that the show acted as a "filler" on France 2.

Despite random broadcasts, the show has met with growing success, including abroad. Interviewed on the occasion of the eleventh season in 2017, Stéphane Bern said: "The main thing that's changed is that people abroad are starting to get to know Secrets d'Histoire better. We've been approached by the Swedes, for example." According to him, this new notoriety had "opened doors" for the show.

In the same year, the film extracts were removed and replaced by scenes of historical re-enactments with actors, filmed especially for the show. The actors were dressed in period costumes, but did not speak any of the text, with commentary provided by historians Stéphane Bern and Isabelle Benhadj.

The decision to shoot re-enactment sequences was due to the refusal of some directors, such as Luc Besson with his film Jeanne d'Arc (The Messenger: The Story of Joan of Arc), to have their films cut in the editing process, but also because the production of Secrets d'Histoire sometimes needed scenes that didn't exist in the films.

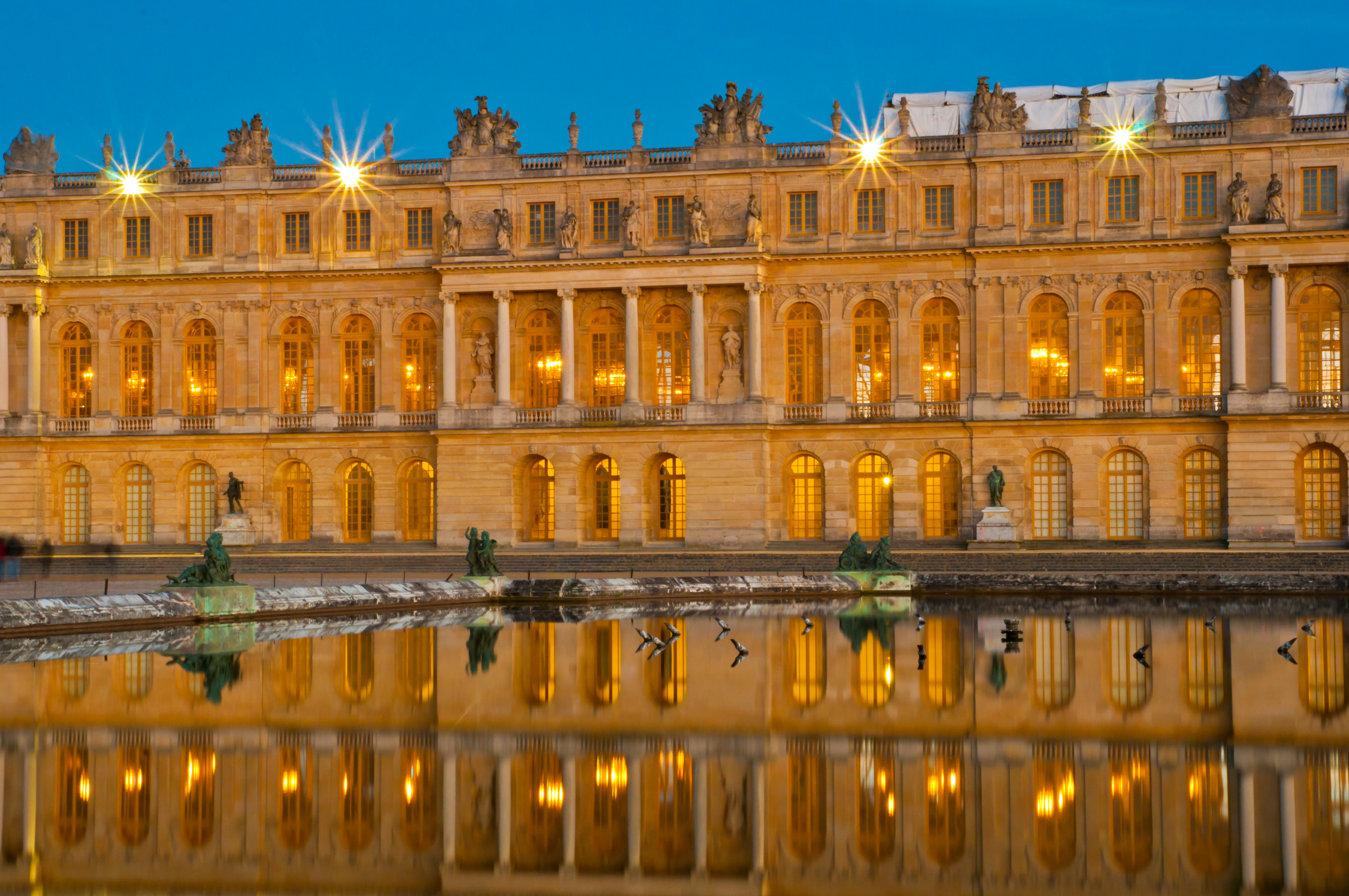
In 2018, an evening event was organized at the Palace of Versailles to celebrate the show's tenth anniversary.

According to the show's producer, Jean-Louis Remilleux, the issue of broadcasting rights also led the production team to opt for re-enactments. In fact, even if reenactment scenes cost significantly more than scenes from films or TV movies (10,000 euros for a reenactment compared with 4,000 to 6,000 euros for a film), this avoids the production having to pay rights again if the episodes are rebroadcast.

In June 2018, a party was organized at the Château de Versailles to celebrate the show's tenth anniversary. On this occasion, patrons of the château were invited, as well as viewers who had registered on the show's Facebook page. "Ten years ago, we were told that a history show was just for old ladies doing macramé in Southern Brittany. The network didn't believe in Stéphane either. And have you seen our ratings?" enthuses the show's producer Jean-Louis Remilleux.

In August 2019, the show was mourned by the death of writer and columnist Michel de Decker, who had collaborated on numerous issues. On hearing of his death, Stéphane Bern paid tribute to him: "I owe him a lot, and the show owes him a lot. He made the show great for over ten years. He was very attached to the show."

=== New life on France 3 (since 2019) ===
In October 2019, the show was switched to the France 3 channel. This choice is explained by the France Télévisions group's desire to maintain editorial consistency between its two channels, France 2 and France 3. As France 3 focuses on promoting France's heritage and regions, through programs such as Le Village préféré des Français (French Favourite Village) and Des racines et des ailes (Roots and wings), France Télévisions management decided to broadcast the program Secrets d'Histoire on this channel.

In an interview with Le Parisien, France Télévisions' second-in-command, Takis Candilis, said that the group wanted to take advantage of the opportunity to offer viewers "more prime-time episodes", without specifying whether these would be new or reruns.

From October 2019, the show was broadcast regularly on Monday evenings on France 3, a choice that satisfied Stéphane Bern, for whom it was important for the program to have a fixed weekday slot.

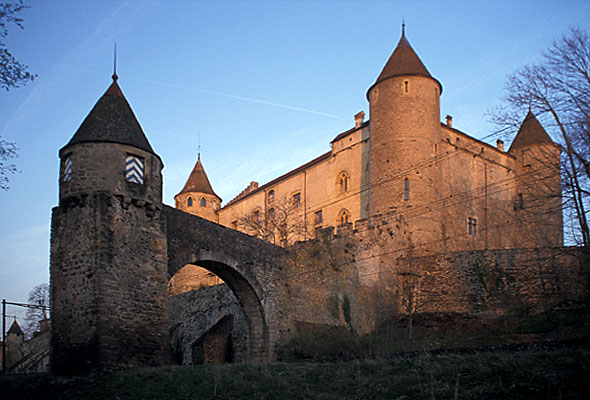
In view of the COVID-19 pandemic in 2020, some shoots, such as the one at the Grandson Castle, were carried out by local crews.

Since its broadcast on France 3, the show has recorded encouraging audience figures. The first three episodes broadcast from October 2019 averaged 2.4 million viewers (10.5% market share). Following these good results, the Secrets d'Histoire team has indicated that nine further issues have been commissioned for 2020, with a budget of 400,000 euros for each program.

In 2020, the COVID-19 pandemic and health measures taken by various European countries disrupted the filming of certain programs. As a result, some shoots scheduled outside France were either cancelled or entrusted to local crews. This was the case for the program dedicated to Mary of Burgundy, part of which took place at the Château de Grandson in Switzerland. As museum curator Camille Verdier explains it was a local team that took charge of filming at the castle: "We were contacted and everything fell into place very quickly. Because of the confinement and border closures, a team from Geneva took care of the shooting, in the presence of the director".

The filming of a program on Napoleon I, to mark the bicentenary of his death, was also disrupted. "We were supposed to do all the sets on St. Helena, but we would have had to endure a quarantine on location. So we shot at Fontainebleau and Les Invalides," explains Stéphane Bern.

The same year saw the launch of a spin-off of the show, based on the same principle and devoted to famous places: Si les murs pouvaient parler (If the walls could talk), on France 2.

On January 25, 2021, the show announced the launch on March 8 of secretsdhistoire.tv, a pay-per-view video platform on the Internet, allowing viewers to watch all issues of Secrets d'Histoire, as well as other types of programs related to history and heritage. In an interview with La Nouvelle République newspaper, platform manager Baptiste Mathon explains:

All 150 episodes of Secrets d'Histoire will be featured, as well as previously unpublished documents and new multidisciplinary programs. History will be told through the prism of sports, cooking, make-up, fashion, decoration, gardening... [...] All interviews with historians will be available to subscribers worldwide. It's the same way Netflix works.

From January 2023 onwards, the show was moved from Monday to Wednesday evenings, where it is regularly broadcast.

== Program description ==
=== Choice of topics ===
In an interview with Télérama in October 2019, Stéphane Bern explained how the subjects for the various programs were chosen: "We have lists with my producer Jean-Louis Remilleux, and after that, we go and see France Télévisions' cultural programs department. [...]" he explains.

One important criterion is the possibility of taking viewers on a tour of French heritage sites. He explains:

We make lists of subjects, always bearing in mind that it has to have an impact on: What heritage site can we show the French? [...] For me, this is a requirement, because I believe that there is a geography of History. History can only be told properly in the places where it took place. With young people, that's what moves them the most. [...] It really makes history more accessible.

Another criterion is the commemoration of important anniversaries, such as the centenary of the birth or death of a historical figure. In 2015, to mark the tricentenary of the death of Louis XIV, the program aired two consecutive issues on the reign of the "Sun King". The first, Louis XIV, l'homme et le roi (Louis XIV, the man and the king), retraced the monarch's childhood, his seizure of power and his conception of absolute monarchy. The second, Louis XIV, le roi est mort, vive le roi! (Louis XIV, the king is dead, long live the king!) focuses on the end of the monarch's life, and the various deaths that created problems for the succession to the French throne. In 2020, to mark the 250th anniversary of Ludwig van Beethoven's birth, the show devoted a special edition to him, entitled Beethoven, tout pour la musique (Beethoven, all for the music).

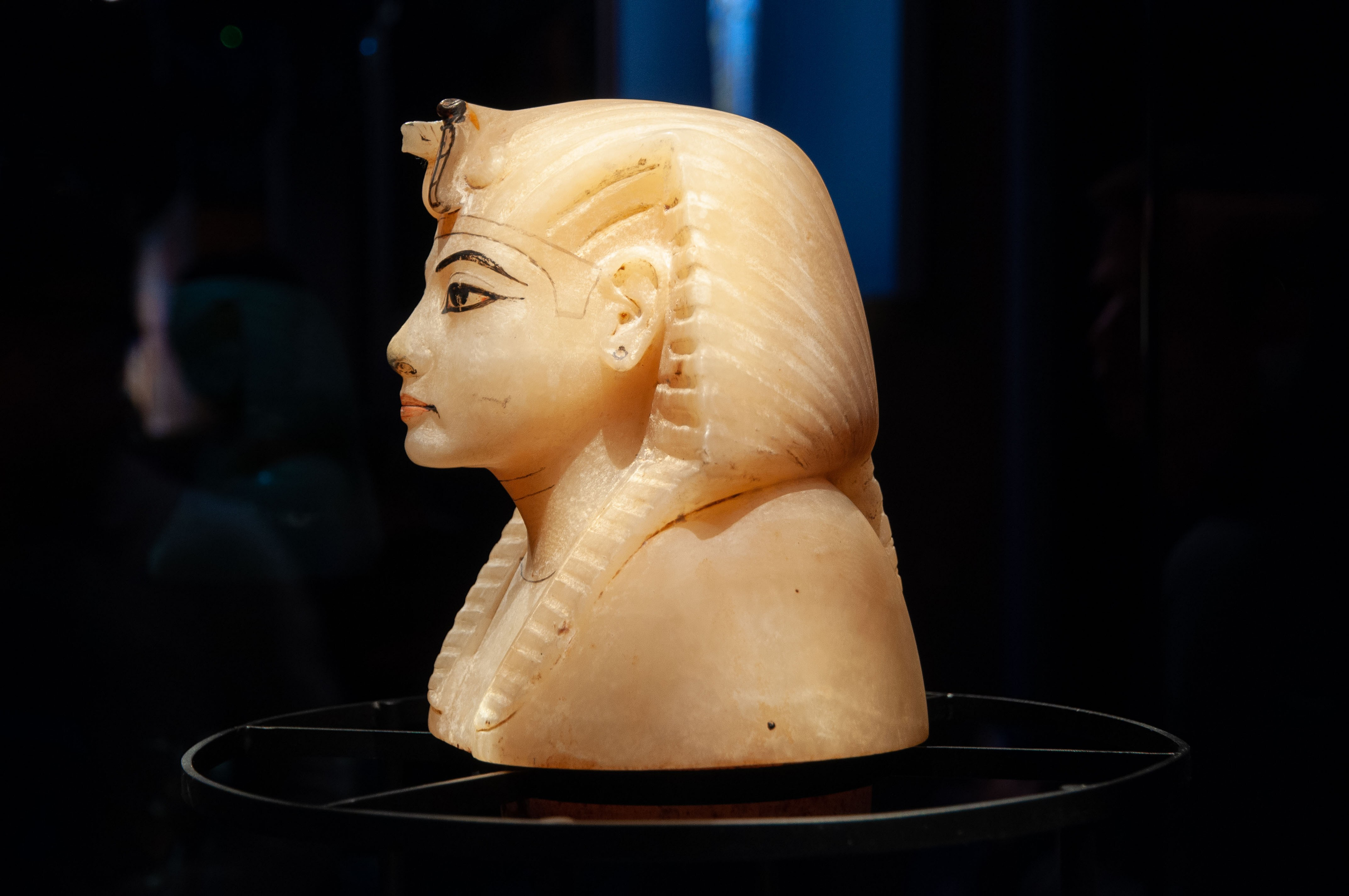
In 2019, an issue on Tutankhamun is broadcast to coincide with an exhibition on the pharaoh at the Grande halle de la Villette.

The existence of temporary exhibitions in certain museums is also an opportunity for the show to highlight certain characters. For example, during an exhibition on the Tudors at the Musée du Luxembourg in 2015, the show aired an issue devoted to Queen Elizabeth I of England. In 2019, on the occasion of the exhibition Tutankhamun, the Pharaoh's Treasure held at the Grande halle de la Villette in Paris, an issue on Tutankhamun and Ramesses II was broadcast.

During a shoot at Souvigny in 2018, Stéphane Bern confirmed the existence of these criteria:

The selection is made on the basis of interest and historical interest. Depending on the year, there are anniversaries. Right now, there's an exhibition on Louis-Philippe. We thought it only natural to do a show about Louis-Philippe. We also celebrated Saint-Louis' birthday and Josephine's bicentenary.

=== History of topics covered ===
The majority of programs feature a portrait of a historical figure. Some programs are devoted to well-known figures such as Louis XIV, François I, or Napoleon I, while others are devoted to lesser-known figures such as Thérèse de Lisieux or certain female figures of the French Revolution like Olympe de Gouges and Anne-Josèphe Théroigne de Méricourt.

Louis XIV is one of the most talked-about characters in Secrets d'Histoire (three programs are devoted to him).

The choice of focusing on the lives of characters rather than on the history of ideas or social movements is assented to by presenter Stéphane Bern: "I'm among those who think it's important to know the reigns, to know those who wrote history, and not just the evolution of ideas, this global vision that prevents students from having landmarks and a certain anchoring".

The characters chosen are often from the nobility (kings, queens, emperors, empresses, etc.). Of the eighty-five subjects broadcast between January 2007 and July 2014, fifty dealt with a crowned head.

According to Stéphane Bern, this editorial choice was made in response to audience demand:

Every time I do a show about revolutionaries, painters, or people like Clemenceau, it doesn't work as well as when I do a show about Marie Antoinette. [...] Besides, I've already covered a lot of revolutionaries. In 2016, I did an issue on Les femmes de la Révolution (Women of the Revolution) and it flopped in the ratings.

Some issues are dedicated to artistic figures: writers (Victor Hugo, George Sand, Agatha Christie), painters (Michelangelo, Leonardo da Vinci, Raphael, Claude Monet, Pablo Picasso), musicians (Mozart, Beethoven), actors (Sarah Bernhardt), playwrights (Molière) or opera singers (Maria Callas). Others are political figures (Richelieu, Mazarin, Fouquet, Talleyrand, Danton, Clemenceau, Churchill, De Gaulle), military figures (Joan of Arc) or navigators (Christopher Columbus). Some historical figures have been the subject of several broadcasts. Louis XIV and Napoleon I, for example, were the subject of three programs. Two programs were devoted to Cleopatra, Joan of Arc, Molière, Madame de Pompadour, Casanova, Mozart, Elisabeth of Austria (Sissi), Ludwig II of Bavaria and Jesus.

Although Antiquity is not one of the most represented periods on the show, issues are regularly devoted to characters from this period (Alexander the Great, Julius Caesar, Cleopatra, Agrippina, Nero, Jesus, Judas, Nefertiti, Tutankhamun).

More rarely, some issues are devoted to illustrious places (L'Élysée, Monaco, the royal residences or the Vatican), historical enigmas (the Templar treasure, the Iron Mask, the Beast of Gévaudan) or landmark events (the storming of the Bastille).

=== Broadcast format ===
==== Previous formula ====
Between 2007 and 2008, the program alternated reports with on-set debates hosted by Stéphane Bern. The reports consisted of interviews with historians, interspersed with presentations of archive documents, paintings and film extracts recreating these historic events, all commented on by a voice-over.

The on-set debates were filmed in the Royal Library of Versailles. Hosted by Stéphane Bern, the program was accompanied by Isabelle Heullant-Donat (historian of the Middle Ages at the University of Reims Champagne-Ardenne), Clémentine Portier-Kaltenbach (history columnist at Le Nouvel Obs) and Philippe Charlier (paleopathologist and forensic pathologist). In this format, programs lasted around an hour.

==== New formula ====
Secrets d'Histoire - Versailles fountains montage

As of 2017, the film extracts had been removed to make way for scenes of historical re-enactments with actors. The actors were dressed in period costumes, but didn't speak a word, with commentary provided by historians Stéphane Bern and Isabelle Benhadj. In the new format, programs lasts between an hour and a half and two hours.

== Speakers ==
Depending on the subject, various specialists are interviewed during the program to shed light on the characters or the historical context. They may be historians, writers who have written a biography of the character in question, professors, archaeologists or museum curators.

== List of broadcasts ==
=== Season 1 (2007) ===
The first season was broadcast on Sunday afternoons from September 3 to December 2, 2007, on France 2.

It consists of eight episodes devoted to historical mysteries such as the assassination of Empress Sissi, or debated historical events such as the death of Napoleon I.

Rank	First broadcast	Title	Description
1	September 30, 2007	Did Napoleon die of poisoning?	The death of Napoleon I.
2	October 7, 2007	Was Joan of Arc betrayed by the King?	Joan of Arc at the end of her life.
3	October 7, 2007	Why did Cleopatra commit suicide?	A look back at the suicide of Egypt's last queen, Cleopatra.
4	October 21, 2007	Why was Sissi the Empress murdered?	The death of Elisabeth of Wittelsbach, Empress of Austria.
5	October 28, 2007	Did Molière write his plays?	Molière's authorship of works attributed to him.
6	November 4, 2007	Mary Stuart: martyred queen or manipulator?	The story of Mary Stuart, Queen of Scots and Queen of France.
7	November 25, 2007	Did La Pompadour lead Louis XV to his downfall?	Madame de Pompadour's role with Louis XV.
8	December 2, 2007	Did Louis XVII, the child king, die in prison?	The death of Louis XVII in the Temple prison.

=== Season 2 (2008) ===
The second season ran from January 27 to August 31, 2008, on France 2.

Twenty-one issues were devoted to historical mysteries, such as the mystery of the Man in the Iron Mask, or famous historical events that have been the subject of debate, such as the assassination of the Romanovs in 1918. To mark the reopening of the Petit Trianon estate, closed for three years for restoration, a special issue is devoted to Queen Marie-Antoinette.

The programs were broadcast on Sunday afternoons, with the exception of those from August 4 to 21, which were broadcast in prime time.

Rank	First broadcast	Title	Description	Number of viewers	Audience share	References
9	January 27, 2008	Nostradamus: prophet or impostor?	The predictions of Nostradamus.			
10	February 17, 2008	Did Judas betray Jesus?	Judas's betrayal of Jesus.			
11	February 24, 2008	Mata Hari: spy or femme fatale?	The portrait of Mata Hari.			
12	March 2, 2008	Who was behind the man in the iron mask?	The enigma of the Man in the Iron Mask.			
13	March 16, 2008	Who was the real Casanova?	The personality of Casanova.			
14	March 23, 2008	Why did Charlotte Corday murder Marat?	Charlotte Corday's assassination of Marat.			
15	March 30, 2008	Did Robin Hood really exist?	A look back at the possible existence of the medieval hero Robin Hood.			
16	April 20, 2008	What is the mystery of the Beast of Gévaudan?	The enigma surrounding the Beast of Gévaudan.			
17	April 27, 2008	Where is the Templar treasure hidden?	The mystery surrounding the Templar treasure.			
18	May 4, 2008	Did Christopher Columbus discover America?	Christopher Columbus' discovery of America.			
19	May 18, 2008	Why did Mozart die prematurely?	The death of Mozart.			
20	June 15, 2008	What mystery surrounds the death of the Romanovs?	The execution of the Romanovs.			
21	June 22, 2008	Who was behind the Chevalier d'Éon?	The sexual identity of the Chevalier d'Éon.			
22	June 29, 2008	Gilles de Rais: the true story of Bluebeard	Portrait of Gilles de Rais.			
23	July 31, 2008	Catherine de Médicis and the intrigues of the Loire castles	Portrait of Catherine de Médici, wife of Henry II and mother of Francis II, Charles IX and Henry III.			
24	August 3, 2008	Was Sissi's son Rudolf murdered?	The death of Rudolf of Austria, son of Elisabeth of Wittelsbach.			
25	August 7, 2008	Marie-Antoinette intimate	Visit the Petit Trianon, a gift from Louis XVI to Queen Marie-Antoinette.			
26	August 14, 2008	Napoleon and women	Napoleon's relationship with his mother, wives and mistresses.			
27	August 21, 2008	They ruled Versailles	The passions of the great monarchs at the court of Versailles.	3 100 000	15,6%	
28	August 24, 2008	Did Rasputin hasten the end of the tsars?	Rasputin's ascendancy over the Russian imperial family.			
29	August 31, 2008	Was Ludwig II of Bavaria murdered?	The death of Ludwig II of Bavaria.			

=== Season 3 (2009) ===
The third season ran from August 3 to August 27, 2009, on France 2.

Rank	First broadcast	Title	Description	Number of viewers	Audience share	References
30	August 13, 2009	Henry VIII: a tyrant's love	Portrait of Henry VIII of England, a king of extravagance.	2 481 000	14,3%	
31	August 20, 2009	Henri IV: the king at heart	Portrait of Henri IV, romantic seducer.	3 336 000	18,2%	
32	August 27, 2009	Catherine II: sleepless nights in St Petersburg	Portrait of Catherine II of Russia, Tsarina of Russia.	3 034 000	15,5%	

=== Season 4 (2010) ===
The fourth season ran from August 4 to August 25, 2010, on France 2.

It featured a series of four programs devoted to influential women: Eugénie de Montijo, the last empress of France; Anne of Austria, mother of Louis XIV; Diane de Poitiers, favorite of King Henry II; and Madame Palatine.

Rank	First broadcast	Title	Description	Number of viewers	Audience share	References
33	August 4, 2010	Eugenie, the last empress	Portrait of Eugénie de Montijo, who became Empress of the French when she married Napoleon III.	3 000 000	15%	
34	August 11, 2010	Diane de Poitiers, queen of favorites	Portrait of Diane de Poitiers, royal governess and mistress of King Henry II.	2 600 000	13%	
35	August 18, 2010	La Palatine, a gossip at the court of Louis XIV	Portrait of Elisabeth-Charlotte of Bavaria, sister-in-law of Louis XIV.	2 900 000	14%	
36	August 25, 2010	Anne of Austria, mysterious mother of the Sun King	Portrait of Anne of Austria, mother of Louis XIV.	3 200 000	15,5%	

=== Season 5 (2011) ===
The fifth season ran from July 12 to September 18, 2011, on France 2.

To coincide with the Claude Monet retrospective at the Grand Palais in Paris in January 2011, a program was devoted to the French painter. A special program was also devoted to a visit to the Élysée Palace.

All programs were broadcast in prime time, with the exception of the program on the Élysée Palace, which was broadcast at 10:30 pm.

Rank	First broadcast	Title	Description	Number of viewers	Audience share	References
37	July 12, 2011	Tutankhamun: a pharaoh's treasure	Portrait of Tutankhamun, eleventh pharaoh of the 18th dynasty.	3 410 000	14,5%	
38	August 9, 2011	Francis I: king of kings	Portrait of Francis I, King of France.	3 904 000	18,6%	
39	August 16, 2011	Queen Victoria or the empire of the senses	Portrait of Victoria during the longest reign in British history.	3 572 000	17,8%	
40	August 23, 2011	Nicolas Fouquet: the offended Sun	Portrait of Nicolas Fouquet, Superintendent of Finances under Louis XIV.	3 690 000	16,4%	
41	August 30, 2011	Claude Monet: secret gardens at Giverny	Portrait of Claude Monet, French Impressionist painter.	2 989 000	12,5%	
42	September 6, 2011	Sissi Empress: love, glory and tragedy	Portrait of Elisabeth of Bavaria, known as "Sissi", Empress of Austria.	3 511 000	13,6%	
43	September 18, 2011	If the walls of the Élysée Palace could speak	Visit to the Élysée Palace.	1 600 000	12%	

=== Season 6 (2012) ===
The sixth season ran from May 29 to November 6, 2012, on France 2.

The season featured twelve episodes devoted to famous historical figures such as Victor Hugo and Suleiman the Magnificent, as well as lesser-known ones like Queen Christine of Sweden. To mark the 60th anniversary of her reign, a program was also dedicated to Queen Elizabeth II of England.

Rank	First broadcast	Title	Description	Number of viewers	Audience share	References
44	May 29, 2012	Elizabeth II, in the intimacy of the reign	Portrait of Elizabeth II, Queen of the United Kingdom and Head of the Commonwealth from 1952 to 2022.	4 500 000	17%	
45	July 3, 2012	Louis XIV, the passions of the Sun King	A look back at the passions of King Louis XIV.	4 905 000	21%	
46	July 10, 2012	Victor Hugo, the hidden face of the great man	Portrait of Victor Hugo.	4 237 000	17,7%	
47	July 17, 2012	Isabelle the Catholic	The reign of Isabella I of Castile.	4 033 000	18,4%	
48	July 24, 2012	Louis XV and Marie Leczinska, deception at Versailles	Cross-portraits of Louis XV and his wife, Queen Marie Leszczynska.	3 828 000	19%	
49	August 7, 2012	Christine of Sweden: queen of scandals	The life of the little-known Christine of Sweden.	3 353 000	15,7%	
50	August 21, 2012	Soliman the Magnificent	Portrait of the best-known sultan, Suleiman the Magnificent.	3 433 000	17,1%	
51	August 28, 2012	Marie-Caroline, the indomitable Queen of Naples and Sicily	Portrait of Maria Carolina of Austria, Queen of Naples and Sicily.	3 020 000	12,9%	
52	September 4, 2012	The Duc d'Aumale, the magician of Chantilly	Portrait of Prince Henri d'Orléans, and history of the collections at his Château de Chantilly, now France's second-largest museum.	3 509 000	13,9%	
53	September 11, 2012	Monaco and the Grimaldi princes	Prince Albert II opens the doors of the palace to reveal the history of his family, the Grimaldis, who have ruled the rock of Monaco for over seven hundred years.	4 719 000	18,7%	
54	October 16, 2012	Talleyrand, the lame devil	Portrait of Prince Charles-Maurice de Talleyrand-Périgord.	3 980 000	14,5%	
55	November 6, 2012	La Fayette, once upon a time in America	Portrait of Marquis Gilbert du Motier de La Fayette.	3 480 000	13%	

=== Season 7 (2013) ===
The seventh season ran from January 15 to December 26, 2013, on France 2.

The season consisted of fifteen issues devoted to famous historical figures such as Mozart and Armand Jean du Plessis de Richelieu, plus a special issue devoted to the storming of the Bastille. To mark the 40th anniversary of Pablo Picasso's death, an issue was dedicated to the Spanish painter.

In terms of audience ratings, the issue devoted to Jesus of Nazareth gave the show its best score of the season (4.85 million viewers).

Rank	First broadcast	Title	Description	Number of viewers	Audience share	References
56	January 15, 2013	Molière takes off his mask!	Portrait of Jean-Baptiste Poquelin, known as Molière, on the occasion of the 391st anniversary of his birth.	3 374 000	11,9%	
57	February 19, 2013	Juan Carlos, King of the Spaniards	Portrait of the King of Spain, Juan Carlos I.	3 676 000	14,1%	
58	March 26, 2013	If Vatican walls could talk	Portrait of Vatican.	4 539 000	16,1%	
59	April 9, 2013	The Picasso mystery	Portrait of Picasso, on the 40th anniversary of his death	2 499 000	9,5%	
60	May 7, 2013	A man named Jesus	Portrait of Jesus of Nazareth.	4 856 000	19,8%	
61	July 14, 2013	July 14, 1789, the morning of the great evening	A look back at the day the Bastille was taken.	3 676 000	19,1%	
62	August 6, 2013	Sarah Bernhardt, her life, her follies	Portrait of Sarah Bernhardt.	2 529 000	12,5%	
63	August 13, 2013	Cardinal de Richelieu: heaven can wait	Portrait of Richelieu the cardinal builder.	3 550 000	18,1%	
64	August 20, 2013	Mozart: freedom or death!	Portrait of Wolfgang Amadeus Mozart.	3 385 000	16,5%	
65	August 27, 2013	Queen Amélie, a Frenchwoman in Portugal!	Portrait of Amélie, Queen of Portugal.	3 470 000	14,8%	
66	September 3, 2013	I, Charles V, master of the world	Portrait of Charles Quint.	3 510 000	14%	
67	October 1, 2013	Gatsby and the Magnificents	Portraits of American billionaires since the Civil War: John Davison Rockefeller, John Jacob Astor IV, John Pierpont Morgan, William Henry Vanderbilt and Andrew Carnegie.	2 809 000	10,9%	
68	November 5, 2013	Frédéric II: the King of Prussia is a bit baroque	Portrait of Frédéric II of Prussia.	2 743 000	9,8%	
69	December 3, 2013	Georges Clemenceau: a Tiger with a big heart	Portrait of Georges Clemenceau.	3 600 000	14%	
70	December 26, 2013	Gayatri Devi: a princess in the land of the Maharajas	Portrait of Gayatri Devi.	3 134 000	12,6%	

=== Season 8 (2014) ===
The eighth season ran from February 25 to November 25, 2014, on France 2.

The season was marked by the commemoration of several anniversaries, such as the centenary of the start of the First World War and the four hundredth anniversary of the Romanov dynasty. To mark the occasion, programs were dedicated respectively to Archduke Franz Ferdinand of Austria and the last Tsar of Russia, Nicholas II. On the occasion of the opening to the public of the Fort de Brégançon, residence of the President of the French Republic, an issue was also devoted to a visit to the various holiday resorts of political and royal personalities. The vast majority of programs were broadcast in the first half of the evening, with the exception of the program on Franz Ferdinand of Austria, which was broadcast at 4:30 p.m. to mark the centenary of the First World War.

In terms of audience ratings, the issue devoted to the residences of power gave the show its best score of the season (3.63 million viewers). Conversely, the issue devoted to Franz Ferdinand of Austria achieved mixed results, attracting just 900,000 viewers (the lowest audience of the season).

Rank	First broadcast	Title	Description	Number of viewers	Audience share	References
71	February 25, 2014	Nicholas II: Russia's last tsar	Portrait of Nicholas II, on the occasion of the four-hundred-year history of the Romanov dynasty.	3 625 000	14,3%	
72	June 28, 2014	Franz Ferdinand or the end of the world	Portrait of Franz Ferdinand of Austria, to mark the centenary of his assassination, which sparked off the First World War.	900 000	9%	
73	July 14, 2014	Danton: To arms, citizens!	Portrait of Georges Jacques Danton.	2 863 000	13,9%	
74	July 15, 2014	Royal vacations...	Portrait of the residences of power: Fort de Brégançon, Castel Gandolfo and Château de Balmoral.	3 628 000	16,8%	
75	July 22, 2014	La Pompadour or the king in love	Portrait of the Madame de Pompadour, mistress of Louis XV.	3 428 000	16,1%	
76	July 29, 2014	Agnès Sorel, first of the favorites	Portrait of Agnès Sorel, mistress Charles VII.	3 428 000	15,6%	
77	August 5, 2014	Glory and sorrow of Maria Callas	Portrait of Maria Callas.	2 375 000	11,7%	
78	August 12, 2014	The irresistible rise of Madame de Maintenon	Portrait of Madame de Maintenon, mistress and later morganatic wife of Louis XIV.	3 149 000	16%	
79	August 19, 2014	The Queens of Paris	Portraits of La Castiglione, La Païva, Caroline Otero, Liane de Pougy.	2 907 000	14,2%	
80	August 26, 2014	De Gaulle, the last of the giants	Portrait of Charles de Gaulle, to mark the 70th anniversary of the Liberation of Paris.	3 450 000	14,8%	
81	September 2, 2014	Grand Duchess Charlotte of Luxembourg	Portrait of Charlotte of Luxembourg.	2 800 000	11,6%	
82	September 9, 2014	Saint Louis, on earth as it is in heaven	Portrait of Louis IX, known as Saint Louis, on the occasion of the 800th anniversary of his birth.	3 281 000	13,7%	
83	October 14, 2014	Anne of Brittany, twice queen	Portrait of Anne of Brittany to mark the 500th anniversary of her death.	3 419 000	13,7%	
84	October 21, 2014	Mazarin, dangerous liaisons	Portrait of Cardinal Mazarin.	3 177 000	12,1%	
85	November 18, 2014	Queen Hortense for better and for Empire...	Portrait of Hortense de Beauharnais.	3 080 000	11,9%	
86	November 25, 2014	Julius Caesar or the glory of Rome	Portrait of Julius Caesar.	3 179 000	11,7%	

=== Season 9 (2015) ===
The ninth season ran from April 7 to October 20, 2015, on France 2.

The season was marked by the commemoration of several anniversaries, including the bicentenary of the Battle of Waterloo and the tercentenary of the death of King Louis XIV. To highlight the occasion, one program was dedicated to Emperor Napoleon I and two to Louis XIV. To coincide with an exhibition on the Tudors at the Musée du Luxembourg in Paris, an issue was devoted to Queen Elizabeth I.

In terms of audience ratings, the issue devoted to King Louis XVI gave the show its best score of the season (3.81 million viewers).

Rank	First broadcast	Title	Description	Number of viewers	Audience share	References
87	April 7, 2015	Elizabeth I, the virgin queen	Portrait of Elisabeth I of England.	3 170 000	12,6%	
88	May 19, 2015	Louis XVI, the unknown of Versailles	Portrait of Louis XVI.	3 810 000	15,4%	
89	June 2, 2015	How do you become Napoleon?	Portrait of Napoleon Bonaparte on the occasion of the 200th anniversary of the Battle of Waterloo. Reissued on August 15, 2019, to mark the 250th anniversary of Napoleon's birth.	2 900 000	12,5%	
90	August 11, 2015	Eleanor of Aquitaine, a rebel in the Middle Ages	Portrait of Eleanor of Aquitaine.	3 080 000	16,6%	
91	August 18, 2015	The Marquise de Sévigné, the spirit of the great century	Portrait of Marquise de Sévigné.	3 300 000	16,2%	
92	August 25, 2015	Désirée Clary, Marseillaise... and Queen of Sweden	Portrait of Désirée Clary.	2 610 000	11,6%	
93	September 1, 2015	Louis XIV, the man and the king	Portrait of Louis XIV.	3 780 000	16,3%	
94	September 1, 2015	Louis XIV, the king is dead, long live the king!	An evocation of the death of Louis XIV, to mark the 300th anniversary of his death.	2 120 000	20%	
95	September 8, 2015	Holy Charlemagne!	Portrait of Charlemagne.	3 171 000	14%	
96	September 22, 2015	Joan of Arc, in the name of God	Portrait of Joan of Arc.	2 982 000	13,3%	
97	October 20, 2015	Casanova, love in Venice	Portrait of Giacomo Casanova.	2 792 000	11%	

=== Season 10 (2016) ===
The tenth season ran from January 19 to November 15, 2016, on France 2.

The season consists of eleven issues devoted to famous historical figures such as Cleopatra, or lesser-known ones like Wallis Simpson. A special issue was also dedicated to women who played a notable role during the French Revolution (Théroigne de Méricourt, Olympe de Gouges, Charlotte Corday and Thérésa Tallien). In terms of audience ratings, the issue devoted to King Ludwig II of Bavaria gave the show its best score of the season (2.91 million viewers).

Rank	First broadcast	Title	Description	Number of viewers	Audience share	References
98	January 19, 2016	What if Henri III wasn't cute?	Portrait of Henri III.	2 883 000	11,7%	
99	March 29, 2016	Ludwig II of Bavaria, the perched king	Portrait of Ludwig II of Bavaria.	2 921 000	11,9%	
100	May 3, 2016	In Florence, Lorenzo the Magnificent	Portrait of Lorenzo de' Medici.	2 467 000	10,5%	
101	July 12, 2016	Women of the Revolution	Portrait of Madame Tallien, Charlotte Corday, Olympe de Gouges, Théroigne de Méricourt, Madame Roland, Madame de Staël.	2 455 000	11,1%	
102	July 19, 2016	La Grande Mademoiselle: a rebel under Louis XIV	Portrait of Anne-Marie-Louise d'Orléans known as Grande Mademoiselle.	2 237 000	11%	
103	July 26, 2016	Cleopatra or the fatal beauty	Portrait of Cleopatra.	2 816 000	14%	
104	August 2, 2016	George Sand, free and passionate	Portrait of George Sand.	2 906 000	14,5%	
105	August 23, 2016	Churchill, the lion with a tender heart	Portrait of Winston Churchill.	2 259 000	11,8%	
106	August 30, 2016	Alexander the Great, dreams and conquests	Portrait of Alexander the Great.	2 515 000	11%	
107	September 6, 2016	Wallis: the sultry Duchess of Windsor	Portrait of Wallis Simpson.	2 258 000	9,6%	
108	November 15, 2016	La du Barry: love at first sight in Versailles	Portrait of Madame du Barry.	2 701 000	10,6%	

=== Season 11 (2017) ===
The eleventh season ran from January 19 to November 15, 2016, on France 2.

The season consisted of eleven issues devoted to famous historical figures such as the painter Michelangelo and the writer Agatha Christie, or lesser-known ones such as Philippe d'Orléans, cousin of King Louis XV. In terms of audience ratings, the issue devoted to Queen Margot gave the show its best score of the season (3.1 million viewers).

Rank	First broadcast	Title	Description	Number of viewers	Audience share	References
109	June 29, 2017	The black legend of Queen Margot	Portrait of Marguerite of Valois, known as Queen Margot.	3 107 000	14%	
110	July 6, 2017	Maria Theresa, the invasive Empress of Austria	Portrait of Maria Theresa.	2 725 000	13,1%	
111	July 13, 2017	Michelangelo's demons	Portrait of Michelangelo.	2 232 000	12,8%	
112	July 20, 2017	Moulay Ismaïl: the sun king of a thousand and one nights	Portrait of Moulay Ismaïl.	2 266 000	11,7%	
113	July 27, 2017	Caroline, born Bonaparte, married Murat	Portrait of Caroline Bonaparte.	2 216 000	11,2%	
114	August 10, 2017	The Regent, a libertine on the throne of France	Portrait of Philippe II.	2 369 000	12,9%	
115	November 2, 2017	Agatha Christie: The Strange Queen of Crime	Portrait of Agatha Christie.	2 904 000	12,1%	

=== Season 12 (2018) ===
The 12th season ran from April 24 to October 30, 2018, on France 2.

The season featured ten issues devoted to famous historical figures, such as Marie de Médici, Lucrezia Borgia and Nefertiti.

To coincide with an exhibition on King Louis-Philippe I at the Palace of Versailles, an issue was also devoted to the last King of France and his wife Maria Amalia.

After a first issue in 2013, a second issue on Jesus of Nazareth was also broadcast in 2018, with additions based on new discoveries. Indeed, the show's team had confirmed that this one included new elements compared to the first: "This is the sequel to our first documentary devoted to Jesus. Recent archaeological discoveries made us want to enrich our first investigation".

In terms of audience ratings, the issue devoted to Prince Charles of Wales gave the show its best score of the season (2.85 million viewers). Conversely, the issue devoted to French King Louis-Philippe I and his wife Maria Amalia drew just 1.77 million viewers (the lowest audience of the season).

Rank	First broadcast	Title	Description	Number of viewers	Audience share	References
116	April 24, 2018	Josephine, Napoleon's irresistible asset	Portrait of Joséphine de Beauharnais.	1 964 000	8,5%	
117	May 5, 2018	A man named Jesus	Portrait of Jesus of Nazareth (rerun with more details and new discoveries).	2 142 000	11,2%	
118	May 15, 2018	Prince Charles on the steps to the throne	Portrait of Charles of Wales.	2 858 000	12,5%	
119	June 28, 2018	Lucrezia Borgia, a woman in the Vatican	Portrait of Lucrezia Borgia.	2 438 000	11,6%	
120	July 5, 2018	Blanche of Castille, the queen mother, has a strong character...	Portrait of Blanche of Castille.	2 815 000	13,2%	
121	July 12, 2018	Madame Royale, orphan of the Revolution	Portrait of Marie-Thérèse of France, known as Madame Royale.	2 855 000	15%	
122	July 19, 2018	Marie de Médici or the obsession with power	Portrait of Marie de Médici.	2 780 000	15,1%	
123	August 23, 2018	Nefertiti, mysterious queen of Egypt	Portrait of Nefertiti.	2 122 000	11,5%	
124	August 30, 2018	Mary Stuart, Queen of France and Scotland	Portrait of Mary Stuart.	2 100 000	10,6%	
125	October 30, 2018	Louis Philippe and Maria Amalia, our last royal couple	Portrait of Louis Philippe I and Maria Amalia.	1 775 000	7,7%	

=== Season 13 (2019) ===
The thirteenth season ran from March 23 to December 9, 2019, first on France 2 until August 22, then on France 3.

It comprised ten issues devoted to famous historical figures such as Voltaire and Jean de La Fontaine, as well as lesser-known figures such as Emperor Pedro II of Brazil. The season was marked by the commemoration of the five-hundredth anniversary of the death of Leonardo da Vinci. To mark the occasion, a special issue was devoted to the Italian painter and engineer.

On the occasion of the exhibition Tutankhamun, the Pharaoh's Treasure at the Grande Halle de la Villette in Paris, an issue was devoted to two famous pharaohs of ancient Egypt: Ramesses II and Tutankhamun.

Since its broadcast on France 3, the program has enjoyed encouraging audience figures. The issue devoted to Leonardo da Vinci earned the channel its second-highest audience rating ever for a non-fiction program (2,627,000 prime-time viewers, plus 320,000 replay viewers).

Rank	First broadcast	Title	Description	Number of viewers	Audience share	References
126	March 23, 2019	Ramesses II, Tutankhamun, the Egypt of the pharaohs...	Portrait of Ramesses II and Tutankhamun.	2 275 000	12,4%	
127	July 11, 2019	Voltaire or the freedom to think	Portrait of Voltaire.	2 231 000	12,5%	
128	July 18, 2019	Ramesses II or the recipes of eternity	Portrait of Ramesses II (condensed from the previous portrait).	1 762 000	9,6%	
129	August 8, 2019	Pedro II, Brazil's last emperor	Portrait of Pedro II of Brazil.	1 602 000	9,9%	
130	August 22, 2019	Jean de La Fontaine, the man of fables	Portrait of Jean de La Fontaine.	2 619 000	15,2%	
131	October 21, 2019	Leonardo da Vinci, genius without limits	Portrait of Leonardo da Vinci.	2 627 000	12%	
132	October 28, 2019	Mary the Bloody on the throne of England	Portrait of Mary I of England.	1 921 000	8,8%	
133	November 4, 2019	Chevalière d'Éon, without forgery I'm a spy	Portrait of Chevalière d'Éon.	2 437 000	10,7%	
134	December 2, 2019	Anne of France or the honor of the Bourbons	Portrait of Anne of France.	2 222 000	9,2%	
135	December 9, 2019	Charlotte and Maximilien, the dark heroes of Mexico City	Portrait of Charlotte of Belgium and Maximilian I of Mexico.	1 593 000	6,7%	

=== Season 14 (2020) ===
The fourteenth season ran from January 13 to December 14, 2020, on France 3.

It featured eleven issues devoted to famous historical figures such as Vauban and William the Conqueror, as well as lesser-known ones like Thérèse of Lisieux.

To mark the 250th anniversary of Ludwig van Beethoven's birth, a special issue was devoted to the famous German composer and pianist.

In terms of ratings, the February 10 issue devoted to Prince Philip Mountbatten enabled the show to surpass the three-million viewer mark, the program's record since June 2017.

Rank	First broadcast	Title	Description	Number of viewers	Audience share	References
136	January 13, 2020	Marie Antoinette's favorites	Portrait of Marie Antoinette.	1 962 000	9%	
137	January 20, 2020	The splendor and fall of Lady Hamilton	Portrait of Lady Hamilton.	1 851 000	8,5%	
138	January 27, 2020	Agrippina: you'll be a monster, my son...	Portrait of Agrippina the Younger.	2 101 000	9,4%	
139	February 10, 2020	Prince Philip at Her Majesty's service	Portrait of Prince Philip.	3 002 000	13,9%	
140	February 17, 2020	The Imperial Prince or the fury of life	Portrait of Louis-Napoléon.	1 856 000	8,6%	
141	March 9, 2020	Madame de Montespan: the Sun King's great love	Portrait of Madame de Montespan.	1 730 000	7,6%	
142	May 4, 2020	Thérèse, the little saint of Lisieux	Portrait of Thérèse of Lisieux.	2 452 000	10%	
143	September 14, 2020	Vauban, the king and fortresses	Portrait of Sébastien Le Prestre.	2 390 000	10,9%	
144	September 21, 2020	William the Conqueror: England is ours for the taking!	Portrait of William the Conqueror.	2 340 000	10,8%	
145	September 28, 2020	The Duchesse of Berry, a Bourbon rebel!	Portrait of Marie-Caroline of Bourbon-Two Sicilies.	1 980 000	8,8%	
146	December 14, 2020	Beethoven, all for the music	Portrait of Ludwig van Beethoven for the two hundred and fiftyth anniversary of his birth.	1 850 000	8,8%	

=== Season 15 (2021) ===
The year 2021 was marked by the broadcast of programs dedicated to the celebration of several anniversaries, such as the bicentenary of Napoleon I's death.

An issue dedicated to the Franco-Haitian politician Toussaint Louverture was also broadcast on May 10, to mark the National Day of Remembrance of the Slave Trade, Slavery and their Abolition.

In an interview with L'Observateur de Monaco, Stéphane Bern also indicated that twelve new episodes were planned for the year.

The table below lists the unpublished episodes (excluding reruns):

Rank	First broadcast	Title	Description	Number of viewers	Audience share	References
147	January 4, 2021	Nero, tyrant of Rome	Portrait of Emperor Nero and a look back at the great fire of Rome.	1 902 000	8,2%	
148	January 11, 2021	Elisabeth, the funny Queen of Belgium	Portrait of Elisabeth of Bavaria.	2 128 000	9,3%	
149	January 18, 2021	Raphael, the Renaissance prodigy	Portrait of the painter Raphael.	1 945 000	8,7%	
150	March 8, 2021	Josephine Baker, the flower in the gun	Portrait of Josephine Baker.	1 779 000	7,8%	
151	March 15, 2021	Victor Emmanuel II, the first King of Italy	Portrait of Victor Emmanuel II.	1 680 000	7,4%	
152	April 19, 2021	Napoleon, exiled from St. Helena	Portrait on the exile of Napoleon I to Saint Helena.	1 745 000	7,6%	
153	April 26, 2021	Mary of Burgundy: alone against all	Portrait of Mary of Burgundy.	1 638 000	6,8%	
154	May 10, 2021	Toussaint Louverture, freedom at any price	Portrait of Toussaint Louverture.	1 441 000	6,4%	
155	September 20, 2021	Philip the Fair and the strange affair of the Knights Templar	Portrait of Philippe IV of France.	1 836 000	8,3%	
156	September 27, 2021	Louis XV and the Beast of Gévaudan	A look back at the mystery of the Beast of Gévaudan.	1 878 000	9,1%	
157	November 15, 2021	Émile Zola, the truth whatever the cost!	Portrait of Émile Zola.	1 476 000	7,9%	
158	December 6, 2021	Gustave Flaubert, the fury of writing!	Portrait of Gustave Flaubert.	1 374 000	6,4%	

=== Season 16 (2022) ===
The year 2022 was marked by the broadcast of a program on Jean-Baptiste Poquelin, known as Molière, to mark the 400th anniversary of the French actor and playwright's birth, as well as a special program to mark the centenary of the death of Prince Albert I of Monaco.

On the occasion of the death of Queen Elizabeth II on September 8, 2022, the Secrets d'Histoire devoted to her was rebroadcast, exceptionally on France 2, with new testimonials and never-before-seen archive footage.

Rank	First broadcast	Title	Description	Number of viewers	Audience share
159	January 10, 2022	Molière and his mysteries...	Portrait of Molière.	1 789 000	8,8%
160	January 17, 2022	The incredible epic of Richard the Lionheart	Portrait of Richard the Lionheart.	2 172 000	10,6%
161	January 24, 2022	Marie of Romania, the astonishing Queen of the Carpathians	Portrait of Marie of Romania.	1 922 000	9,1%
162	February 28, 2022	The Great Condé: Louis XIV's rival	Portrait of Louis, Grand Condé.	1 889 000	9,4%
163	April 18, 2022	Mata Hari, the spy laid bare	Portrait of Mata Hari.	1 225 000	6%
164	April 25, 2022	Jeanne de Belleville, pirate for love	Portrait of Jeanne de Belleville.	1 545 000	7,4%
165	May 16, 2022	Marguerite of Angoulême: the pearl of François I	Portrait of Marguerite de Navarre.	1 698 000	8,4%
166	June 13, 2022	Albert I of Monaco, Prince of the Oceans	Portrait of Albert I of Monaco.	1 433 000	6,8%
167	August 29, 2022	Diana, the illustrious unknown	Portrait of Diana Spencer.	1 545 000	7,4%
168	September 8, 2022	Elizabeth II, our Queen...	Portrait of Elizabeth II, Queen of the United Kingdom and Head of the Commonwealth, 2012 episode rebroadcast and reworked on the occasion of her death.	3 385 000	16,8%
169	October 24, 2022	Rosa Bonheur, the animals' fairy	Portrait of Rosa Bonheur.	1 474 000	7%
170	October 31, 2022	Ragnar, the Viking who terrorized Paris	Portrait of Ragnar Lodbrok.	1 649 000	8,7%

=== Season 17 (2023) ===
Rank	First broadcast	Title	Description	Number of viewers	Audience share
171	January 18, 2023	The Man in the Iron Mask	Portrait of the Man in the Iron Mask.	2 118 000	10,8%
172	February 15, 2023	The mad love of Auguste Rodin and Camille Claudel	Portrait of the love affair between Rodin and Camille Claudel.	1 119 000	6,3%
173	March 15, 2023	Escape to Varennes: Louis XVI's mad escapade	A look back at King Louis XVI's Flight to Varennes during the French Revolution.	1 453 000	7,4%
174	April 12, 2023	D'Artagnan, the Sun King's musketeer!	Portrait of Charles de Batz de Castelmore, known as d'Artagnan.	2 307 000	11,6%
175	May 17, 2023	Nostradamus, or how to predict your future	Portrait of Nostradamus.	1 760 000	8,7%
176	September 27, 2023	John Paul II, God's athlete	Portrait of Pope John Paul II.	1 320 000	7,1%
177	October 18, 2023	Vercingétorix, the first of the Gauls	Portrait of Vercingetorix.	1 603 000	8,5%
178	November 22, 2023	Napoleon III: The last French emperor	Portrait of Napoleon III.	1 866 000	9,8%
179	December 13, 2023	Vatel, Carème, Escoffier: At the table of kings	Portrait of royal chefs François Vatel, Marie-Antoine Carême and Auguste Escoffier.	1 516 000	7,7%

=== Season 18 (2024) ===
Rank	First broadcast	Title	Description	Number of viewers	Audience share
180	January 17, 2024	Arthur and the Knights of the Round Table	A look back at the legend of King Arthur.	1 696 000	9,1%
181	February 14, 2024	In Denmark: The king, the queen and the handsome doctor	A look back at the love affair between Caroline Matilda, wife of Christian VII King of Denmark and Norway, and the royal physician Johann Friedrich Struensee.	1 327 000	7,4%
182	March 6, 2024	Philip V, the demons of the Spanish king	Portrait of King Philip V of Spain.	1 411 000	7,7%
183	March 20, 2024	Mary Magdalene: So close to Jesus	Portrait of Mary Magdalene.	1 796 000	10,3%
184	April 10, 2024	Henry II: The Last Knight King	Portrait of King Henri II.	1 607 000	8,1%
185	November 20, 2024	Spartacus and the gladiators' revolt	Portrait of Spartacus.	1 617 000	8,7%
186	November 27, 2024	Robin Hood, Prince of Thieves	Portrait of Robin Woods.	1 473 000	8,2%
187	December 4, 2024	Marie-Antoinette: a necklace to lose your mind!	A look back on the Affair of the Diamond Necklace.	1 480 000	8,3%

=== Season 19 (2025) ===
Rank	First broadcast	Title	Description	Number of viewers	Audience share
188	January 15, 2025	Pauline Borghese, the diva of the Empire	Portrait of Pauline Bonaparte, sister of Napoleon Bonaparte.	1 414 000	8,1%
189	January 29, 2025	Louis XI, a reign of terror	Portrait of Louis XI.	1 934 000	10%
190	February 19, 2025	The tragic lovers of Mayerling	A look back on the Mayerling incident.	1 688 000	9,7%

== Program sheet ==
- Credits: the program's first credits (2007–2012) were an extract from the soundtrack of X-Men: The Last Stand, entitled Whirlpool of Love, and composed by John Powell. Since 2013, the second theme has been a work composed by Léonard Le Cloarec, assisted by Bertrand Allagnat and Julien Bonnard, and performed by the Orchestre national de Radio France and the choirs of the Maîtrise de la cathédrale de Reims, images of which can be seen in the end credits.

== Impact on tourism ==
In an interview with TV5Monde in 2018, Stéphane Bern claimed that visits to heritage sites featured in the programs increased by 30% following their broadcast.

In August 2016, for example, the House of George Sand in Nohant-Vic saw a 38% increase in visitor numbers compared with previous years, a success that the château's manager attributed at the time to the Secrets d'Histoire program devoted to George Sand, broadcast at the beginning of August.

The Royal Chapel of Dreux, which was the subject of a Secrets d'Histoire issue in October 2018, also saw a 7% increase in attendance in 2019.

== Critics ==
=== Press releases ===
In its August 2008 review, Le Soir notes that Secrets d'Histoire contains intimate details about the private lives of the characters featured. In this sense, the daily suggests that the program is more entertainment than documentary. It also notes that the program has the advantage of taking viewers "behind the scenes of places of power" such as the châteaux de Malmaison, Compiègne and Fontainebleau.

In November 2013, Le Figaro noted: "Whether he's talking about Marie-Antoinette, Frederick II or Catherine of Russia, Stéphane Bern's passion is infectious. A passion for history and for human beings. The crowned-heads specialist has a gift for taking us back in time, pushing open the door to hidden cabinets and secret passages like a little mouse. Curious and cultured, the journalist lends a lightness to the most serious events. A storyteller's gift to be cultivated."

=== Controversies ===
==== Criticism of the historical aspect of the programs ====
In 2014, the media criticism association Acrimed published an article entitled "Secrets d'Histoire, le magazine royaliste de France 2? (Secrets d'Histoire, France 2's royalist magazine?)", in which it considered the program to be more entertainment than historical documentary, tackling "historically anecdotal" subjects and giving pride of place to the private lives of "great men". For the association, the program is "halfway between a celebrity report and a monarchist manifesto".

It notes that Secrets d'Histoire "is not intended to attract specialists, or even enlightened amateurs. Nor does it aim to offer as many people as possible an accessible, balanced view of a variety of historical subjects, reflecting the points of consensus in the historical community, while leaving sufficient room for doubt and debate. At most, it's a form of audiovisual entertainment that takes a few historical precautions. The genre is not a priori contemptible, but under the guise of offering instructive entertainment, Secrets d'Histoire puts across a very singular version of French history".

In response to these criticisms, Stéphane Bern declares: "It's a public service program, we're not here to popularize, but to interest as many people as possible and make culture accessible". He adds: "We want to encourage debate and contradiction. There is no established truth. That's why historians, who feature prominently on the program, bring different arguments to the table."

This choice to keep history accessible is also embraced by some regular contributors, such as Virginie Girod: "It's a pleasure to share history with a wide audience, to start from the intimate to move towards historical data with this aim: to be accessible to all. [...] As for the contemptuous look of certain academics, that's not a problem. Those who criticize these programs are the ones who are never invited."

==== Criticism for lack of subject diversity ====
The Left Party, via a statement signed on May 26, 2015, by Jean-Luc Mélenchon and Alexis Corbière, and addressed to the president of France Télévisions, made a similar criticism, lamenting that the program presents a "truncated History, nostalgic for kings and queens, presenting the people as a secondary and brutal historical actor when they mobilize".

The press release also pointed out that of the eighty-eight episodes broadcast since 2008, "only five programs, or 6% of the total, have been devoted to personalities or places linked to the Republic".

Stéphane Bern has responded indirectly to these accusations, reaffirming his commitment to the Republic. In an interview with the French newspaper Libération, he also pointed out that program ratings are one of the criteria used to select the best subjects. Finally, he points out that the aim of these programs is to arouse interest in history in all its diversity:

You can't catch flies with vinegar. If you want to reach five million people, you can't do historical dialectics. I'm convinced that what makes history accessible is that you find human passions, love, sex, power and money. People need to identify with it. It's just a gateway, but I'm aware that it's fragmentary.
