= Monthelon =

Monthelon may refer to:

- Monthelon, Marne, a commune in the French region of Champagne-Ardenne
- Monthelon, Saône-et-Loire a commune in the French region of Bourgogne
