= Charles Gratiot Sr. =

American trader (1752–1817)

- Born: Charles Gratiot Sr. 1752; Lausanne, French Canton, Switzerland
- Died: April 20, 1817 (aged 64–65); St. Louis, Missouri, U.S.

Charles Gratiot (1752 – 20 April 1817) was a merchant trader in the American Midwest during the American Revolution. He financed George Rogers Clark with $8,000 for his Illinois campaign, which was never reimbursed.

Gratiot was born in Lausanne, Switzerland, a descendant of Huguenots. As an adult, he emigrated to Montreal to live and work with an uncle involved in the fur trade. He moved to the Illinois country and started his own business in 1777, opening a store at Cahokia and becoming an influential trader. When George Rogers Clark arrived in 1778, Gratiot provided supplies to Clark's men.

Memorial plaque in Vincennes, Indiana

In 1781, Gratiot relocated to St. Louis, where he married Victoire Chouteau, a daughter of Pierre Laclède Liguest, another influential merchant, and Marie Thérèse Bourgeois Chouteau. Charles and Victoire had 13 children, including Charles Gratiot Jr. and Henry Gratiot.

After the American Revolution, Gratiot travelled to Virginia to seek reimbursement for $8,000 in expenses for his aid to the Illinois campaign. Instead of money he was given land grants in Kentucky.

In 1785, Charles Gratiot received a Spanish land grant in south western St. Louis. It was roughly 5712 acres known as the Gratiot League Square, 3 x 3 miles. It extended from the middle of Forest Park south to Pernod Ave and from Kingshighway on the east to Big Bend Blvd.

In 1795, Gratiot hosted William Clark in St. Louis. Gratiot also assisted Meriwether Lewis as a translator with the Spanish governor. In 1804, Gratiot was an official witness to the transfer of Upper Louisiana from Spain to the United States, after which he was appointed as judge of the court of common pleas, justice of the peace and clerk of the board of land commissioners.

Gratiot died of a stroke in St. Louis.
