= Charles Tristan, marquis de Montholon =

French general during the Napoleonic Wars

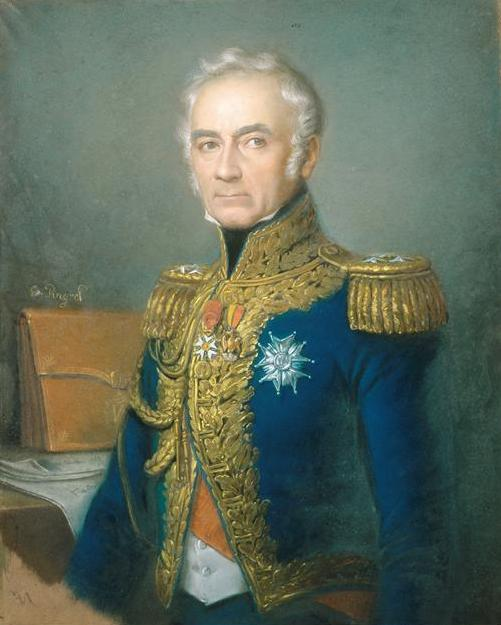
Charles Tristan by Édouard Pingret, c. 1840

Charles Tristan, Marquis de Montholon (French pronunciation: [ʃaʁl tʁistɑ̃ də mɔ̃tɔlɔ̃]; 21 July 1783 – 21 August 1853) was a French general during the Napoleonic Wars. He chose to go into exile on Saint Helena with the ex-emperor after Napoleon's second abdication.

== Early life and career ==
Montholon was born in Paris and was trained for a military career from a young age. In his tenth year, he joined the expedition of Admiral Laurent Truguet to the coast of Sardinia. Entering the army in 1797, he rose rapidly and avowed himself, when Chef d'escadron in Paris at the time of the coup d'état of 18 Brumaire (November 1799), entirely devoted to Bonaparte.

== War service ==
He served in several of the ensuing campaigns, participating in the Battle of Jena (1806) and distinguishing himself at the Battle of Aspern-Essling (May 1809), where he was wounded. At the end of that campaign on the Danube he received the title of count and remained in close attendance on Napoleon, who entrusted him with several important duties. He was chosen for a mission to discuss diplomatic matters with the Austrian commander Archduke Ferdinand Karl Joseph of Austria-Este at Würzburg among others.

At the time of the first abdication of Napoleon at Fontainebleau (11 April 1814), Montholon was one of the few generals who advocated one more attempt to rally the French troops for the overthrow of the Allies.

== In exile with Napoleon ==
After the second abdication (22 June 1815), he and his wife, Albine de Montholon, accompanied the Emperor to Rochefort, where Napoleon adopted the proposal, which emanated from Count Las Cases, that he should throw himself on the generosity of the British and surrender to HMS Bellerophon. Montholon afterwards, at Plymouth, asserted that the conduct of Captain Maitland of the Bellerophon had been altogether honourable, and that the responsibility for the failure must rest largely with Las Cases.

Montholon and his wife accompanied the ex-Emperor to Saint Helena. Napoleon chiefly dictated to Montholon the notes on his career which form a far-from-trustworthy commentary on the events of the first part of his life. Montholon is known to have despised and flouted Las Cases, though in later writings he affected to laud his services to Napoleon. With Gourgaud, who was no less vain and sensitive than he himself, there was a standing feud which would have led to a duel but for the express prohibition of Napoleon.

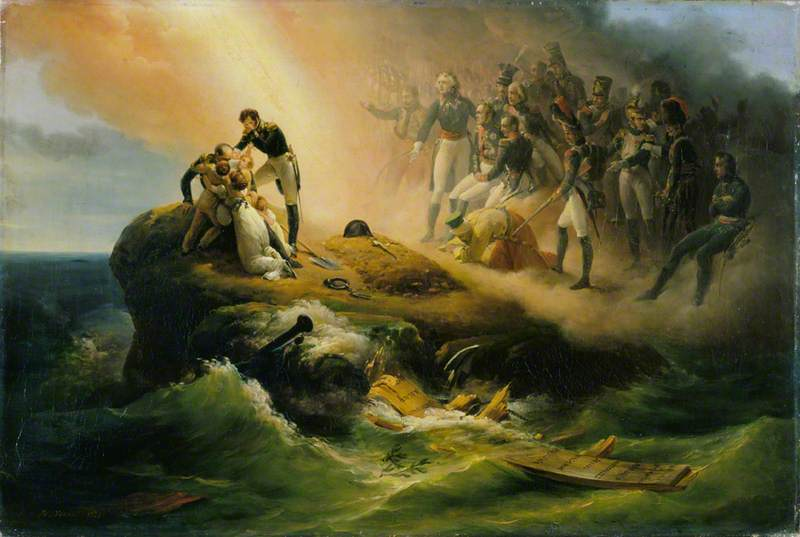
Napoleon's Tomb by Horace Vernet, 1821. Montholon is shown amongst the mourners on the left.

Las Cases left the island in November 1816, and Gourgaud in January 1818; but Montholon, despite the departure of his wife, stayed on at Longwood to the end of the former Emperor's life (May 1821).

Montholon had to spend many years in what is now Belgium, and in 1840 acted as "chief of staff" in the absurd "expedition" conducted by Louis Napoleon from London to Boulogne. He was condemned to imprisonment at Ham, but was released in 1847 thanks to the efforts of Gourgaud, who was then in favour with the administration; he then retired to England and published Récits de la captivité de l'Empereur Napoléon à Sainte-Hélène. In 1849 he became one of the deputies for the Legislative Assembly under the Second French Republic. He lived to see the establishment of the Second French Empire in 1852.

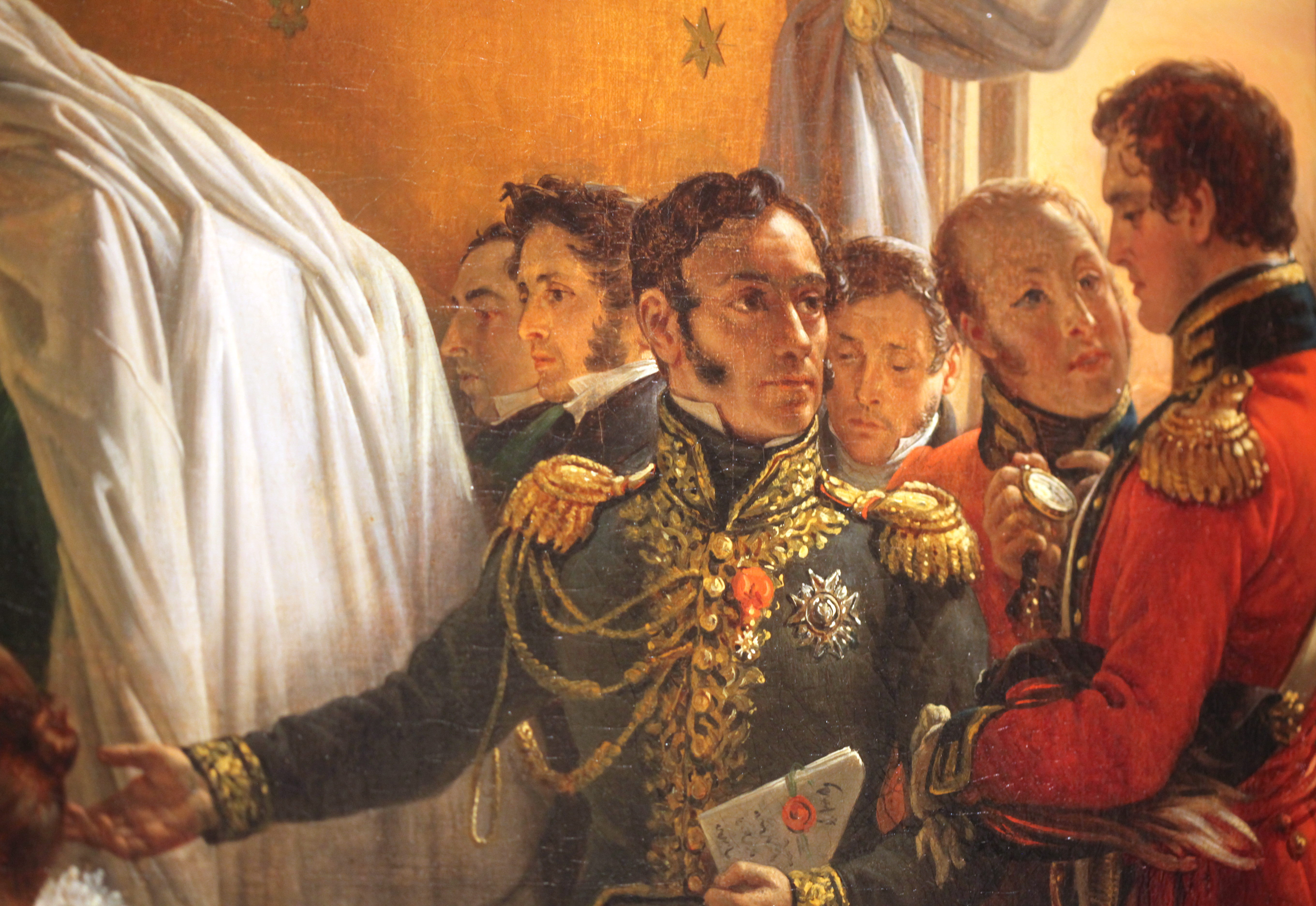
Detail of Charles de Steuben's portrait of Napoleon's death, showing Montholon at centre. To the right are Dr. Burton, Dr. Arnott and Capt. William Crokat; to the left are Coursot (butler, wearing glasses) and Pierron the cook.

Those who believe that Napoleon was murdered by poisoning now regard Montholon as the most likely suspect. This accusation has been argued by Ben Weider, Sten Forshufvud, and Alan Schom.

== Doubts on military service ==
Montholon's military service ultimately enabled him to join Napoleon in the Emperor's final exile. However, closer scrutiny of his military service reveals several falsehoods.

Montholon claimed he had won a sword of honour during the 1800 Hohenlinden campaign. But in fact he had no part in the campaign, as he was facing expulsion from the Army for corruption at the time. He was reintegrated into the Army thanks to influential friends and family, including his brother-in-law, Marshal Macdonald.

In 1809, Montholon claimed to be wounded at the Battle of Jena, an event which his commanding officer swore in a later affidavit did not happen. As well, during Napoleon's first exile in 1814, Montholon lost his commission under the Royalists after only seven days, after he was charged with taking money meant to pay his troops in Clermont-Ferrand.

Of Montholon's own writings, the only one of note is De l'Armée française (1834).

== Family ==
Montholon married Albine Vassal on 2 July 1812, two months after she divorced her second husband, Daniel Roger. Their son, Charles-François-Frédéric, was born in 1814. Montholon probably fathered her two other sons while she was married to Roger, as she gave each the names "Charles", "Tristan", and "de Montholon-Sémonville". Their daughter, Hélène, was born on Saint Helena in 1816.

He fathered another son, Charles Jean Tristan, with his mistress, Catherine O'Hara. They married sometime after Albine's death in 1848.

Charles Jean Tristan married Paolina Fe d'Ostiani and lived in the Palais Simoni Fè in Bienno, Italy. He disappeared after a fatal hunting accident, and his wife died in Brescia, Italy. Before leaving their palace, in 1935 they let the inferior floors to the Panteghini family ad vitam eternam. Their children donated it to the city of Bienno in 1988, and the palace is now the city library and a cultural centre.

== In popular culture ==
- Nigel Terry portrayed Montholon in the 2001 film The Emperor's New Clothes, which was based on the novel The Death of Napoleon, written by Simon Leys.
