= List of the oldest buildings in Wisconsin =

This article attempts to list the oldest extant, freestanding buildings in the state of Wisconsin. Some dates are approximate and based on architectural studies and historical records; other dates are based on dendrochronology. All entries should include citation with reference to: architectural features indicative of the date of construction; a report by an architectural historian; or dendrochronology. If the exact year of initial construction is estimated, it will be shown as a range of dates.

To be listed here a site must:

- date from prior to 1840; or
- be the oldest building in a county, large city, or oldest of its type (church, government building, etc.).

== List ==
Building	Image	Location	Original location (if different)	First built	Use	Notes
Tank Cottage		Heritage Hill State Historical Park, Allouez	Green Bay	1776—1803	Residential	Possibly the oldest extant building in Wisconsin. (Note: The St. Joan of Arc Chapel on the Marquette University campus in Milwaukee is technically older, having been built in the 15th century. The chapel was built in France, shipped to the United States in 1927, and reconstructed at Marquette University in 1966. The Tank Cottage is the oldest Wisconsin building that was originally built in Wisconsin.) Voyageur Joseph Roi built the cottage using the pièce-sur-pièce à coulisse method, which was once common in French-Canadian architecture. Originally located on the Fox River in Green Bay, the cottage was moved to Heritage Hill State Historical Park in 1976.
Fur Trade Cabin		Heritage Hill State Historical Park, Allouez	Green Bay	1800—1810	Residential	Constructed by French-Canadian fur traders in Green Bay using the pièce-sur-pièce à coulisse method, this cabin was discovered to be part of a larger house scheduled for demolition to clear land for a bridge over the Fox River. The cottage was moved to Heritage Hill State Historical Park in 1975.
Strange Powers House		Prairie du Chien		1800–1820	Residential	Built using the pièce-sur-pièce à coulisse method common in early 19th century French-Canadian architecture, the exact date of this building's construction is uncertain. When Zebulon Pike visited the area in 1805, he noted at least eight buildings similar to the Strange Powers house in Prairie du Chien; it is not certain if the house was one of the buildings that Pike saw, or if it was built by early settler Strange Powers, who purchased the lot in 1818.
Francois Vertefeuille House		Prairie du Chien		1810–1820	Residential	Built by French-Canadian fur traders using the pièce-sur-pièce à coulisse method between 1810 and 1820.
Fort Howard Officers' Quarters		Heritage Hill State Historical Park, Allouez	Green Bay	1816–1817 or 1831–1835	Military	One of the buildings of Fort Howard in Green Bay, the U.S. Army built the Fort Howard Officers' Quarters in the Federal style and garrisoned the fort until 1852. The building was donated to the Brown County Historical Association in 1952 and relocated to Heritage Hill State Historical Park in 1975.
Fort Howard Hospital		Heritage Hill State Historical Park, Allouez	Green Bay	1816–1817 or 1834–1835	Military	One of the buildings of Fort Howard in Green Bay, the U.S. Army built the Fort Howard Hospital in the Federal style and garrisoned the fort until 1852. The building was relocated to Heritage Hill State Historical Park in 1975.
Fort Howard Hospital Ward		Heritage Hill State Historical Park, Allouez	Green Bay	1816–1817 or 1834–1835	Military	One of the buildings of Fort Howard in Green Bay, the Fort Howard Hospital Ward functioned as part of the fort hospital. The U.S. Army built the structure in the Federal style and garrisoned the fort until 1852. The building was relocated to Heritage Hill State Historical Park in 1975.
Fort Winnebago Surgeon's Quarters		Portage		1818–1828	Residential/fur trading/military	Originally the home of French-Canadian fur trader Francois LeRoi, the U.S. Army bought the structure in 1828 and used it as one of the original buildings of Fort Winnebago.
Dodge Mining Camp Cabin		Dodgeville		1827	Residential	Remaining building of a lead mining and smelting camp organized by Henry Dodge, who would go on to become the first governor of the Wisconsin Territory and first U.S. senator from the state of Wisconsin. Lead mining was one of the major industries in Wisconsin's early history.
Astor Fur Warehouse		Prairie du Chien		1828	Fur trade	Built in 1828 by Jean Joseph Rolette, an agent of the American Fur Company, the warehouse is a National Historic Landmark and the only known surviving fur trade warehouse in the upper Mississippi valley.
18F Shake Rag Street		Mineral Point		c. 1828	Residential	Part of the Mineral Point Historic District.
Mark Ingraham House, 28 Shake Rag Street		Mineral Point		c. 1830	Residential	One-story limestone cabin built by Cornish lead miners in southwestern Wisconsin. Today a part of the Mineral Point Historic District.
Baird Law Office		Heritage Hill State Historical Park, Allouez	Green Bay	1831 or 1835	Business	Greek Revival structure built by Samuel Wooten Beall at the Main and Monroe Streets in Green Bay. Housed law office of Henry Samuel Baird from 1841 to 1865, and was moved to Heritage Hill State Historical Park in 1975.
Old Indian Agency House		Portage		1832	Government/residential	The house was the residence for John H. Kinzie, who served as an Indian Sub-agent to the Ho-Chunk.
Fort Howard Guard House		Heritage Hill State Historical Park, Allouez	Green Bay	1833–1835	Military	One of the buildings of Fort Howard in Green Bay, the lower floor of guard house functioned as the fort's sally port and prison, while the upper floor housed the commanding officer's office and the fort library. After the U.S. Army stopped garrisoning the fort, the building served as a private residence in Green Bay until Heritage Hill State Park acquired the structure in 2009 and moved it to the park.
Prairie Spring Hotel		Willow Springs		1834	Hotel/residential	Built by Daniel Morgan Parkinson, a settler from Tennessee, the Prairie Spring Hotel's construction is more typical of the vernacular style seen in the early 19th century Southeastern United States. The structure served as an inn on the road from Galena, Illinois to Mineral Point, Wisconsin, and was later the homestead of the Parkinson family.
American Fur Company post		La Pointe		1835	Fur trade	In the early 19th century, the American Fur Company maintained a trading post on Madeline Island in the Apostle Islands. A small warehouse remains from that complex of buildings and today is part of the Madeline Island Museum.
Cothren House		Mineral Point	Blue River	c. 1835	Residential	1.5-story wooden cabin originally located in Blue River, Wisconsin. Moved to Mineral Point in the 1970s.
Gratiot House		Shullsburg		1835	Residential	Built by Indian agent and entrepreneur Henry Gratiot in the vernacular Georgian style. The house is the last remaining structure of Gratiot's Grove, a lead mining settlement that thrived in the 1820s and 1830s.
Henry Merrell House		Portage		1835–1839	Residential	Residence of Henry Merrill (also spelled Merrell), sutler and postmaster for Fort Winnebago along the Portage Canal. Built 1835 to 1839 in Greek Revival style, originally across the canal from the fort.
John Harris Cottage		Mineral Point		c. 1835	Residential	One-story cabin built by Cornish lead miners in southwestern Wisconsin.
Pendarvis House and Trelawny House		Mineral Point		c. 1835	Residential	Limestone cabins built by Cornish lead miners in southwestern Wisconsin. Today the houses are a part of the Pendarvis Historic Site.
Polperro House		Mineral Point		c. 1835	Residential	2.5-story cabin built by Cornish lead miners in southwestern Wisconsin. First floor is limestone with upper 1.5 stories made of wood. Today a part of the Pendarvis Historic Site.
Second Fort Crawford Military Hospital		Prairie du Chien		1835	Military	Built by Col. Zachary Taylor between 1829 and 1835. The original Fort Crawford was built in 1816in the aftermath of the War of 1812. After the Winnebago War of 1827, the U.S. Army decided to build a larger fort, which was garrisoned from 1829 to 1856, temporarily reactivated during the Civil War, and then permanently abandoned in 1865. The hospital was separate from the military installation and is the only surviving building.
Denniston House		Cassville		1836	Government/hotel	Built in 1836 when the Wisconsin Territorial legislature was in the process of choosing a state capital, Denniston House was designed to house the territorial Supreme Court in the hopes that Cassville would be chosen as the seat of government. Cassville was passed over, and the building sat vacant for 18 years until Nelson Dewey bought the building in 1854 and opened it as a hotel.
First Capitol Historic Site		Belmont		1836	Government	The legislature of the Wisconsin Territory held its first session in Belmont on October 25, 1836. Much of the session was spent deciding on a new location for the territorial capital, and the legislature never reconvened in the Belmont capitol building after 1836. The buildings were later used as private residences and livestock barns.
Walker House		Mineral Point		1836	Hotel	Oldest hotel in Mineral Point. Constructed of limestone in three parts, the first in 1836 and the last completed in 1860. Part of the Mineral Point Historic District.
Pottawatomie Lighthouse privy		Rock Island		1836	Sanitation	The outhouse for the original Pottawatomie Lighthouse on Rock Island still stands on the lighthouse grounds and is the oldest-known building in Door County.
Bendickson cabin		Wind Lake		1837	Residential	Built by Norwegian immigrant Halvor Bendickson in 1837, the structure is one of the oldest buildings in Racine County. It is one of several structures built by early Norwegian immigrants that are preserved in Heg Memorial Park.
Brisbois House		Prairie du Chien		c. 1837	Residential	The two-and-a-half-story structure is a rare example of Federal-style architecture from the Wisconsin territorial period. Some early 20th century sources promoted unsubstantiated claims that the house was built as early as 1808 or 1815, but an assessment by the U.S. Landmark Review Project in 1984 determined that the building's style and construction was more typical of the late 1830s and early 1840s.
Hazelwood		Green Bay		1837	Residential	Built in 1837, Hazelwood was the home of early Wisconsin political Morgan Lewis Martin, who drafted the Constitution of Wisconsin. The building is owned by the Brown County Historical Association and is a museum.
Mill House		Sheboygan Falls		1837	Residential/hotel	Two-story wood-frame Greek Revival structure built by the Rochester Lumber Company in 1837 as a boarding house for workers. Also functioned as an inn for settlers arriving in the area. Part of the Cole Historic District in Sheboygan Falls.
Mitchell-Rountree House		Platteville		1837	Residential	1.5-story cottage built in 1837 of carefully fit dolomite for Rev. Samuel Mitchell in a style from his native Virginia. Mitchell had served in the Revolutionary War. John Rountree, founder of Platteville and husband of Mitchell's daughter, probably built the house.
St. Germain dit Gauthier House		Prairie du Chien		1837–1840	Residential	Built by French-Canadian immigrants. Owned by the City of Prairie du Chien.
209 Commerce Street cottage		Mineral Point		1838–1839	Residential	Two-story limestone cabin built by Cornish lead miners in southwestern Wisconsin. Part of the Mineral Point Historic District.
Joseph Goodrich Log Cabin		Milton		1838	Residential/hotel	One-and-a-half-story log cabin built by Joseph Goodrich in 1838. In 1844, Goodrich built the Milton House hotel near the cabin and connected the buildings via an underground tunnel. The site was a safe house on the Underground Railroad, and enslaved African-Americans used the tunnel as a hiding place. As of 2020, the cabin is part of the Milton House museum.
Gredler-Gramins House		Brookfield		1839	Residential	Benjamin Carpenter built the initial fieldstone house in 1839. In 1850 John Gredler expanded that building with a 2-story brick Greek Revival-styled front, producing a saltbox form.
Isham Day House		Mequon		1839	Residential	One of the oldest known buildings in Ozaukee County, the cottage was built by Yankee Isham Day in 1839, before the influx of German immigration in the 1840s. The construction is unusual, with walls framed in vertical sawn timbers joined by mortise and tenon and infilled with brick.
Odd Fellows Hall		Mineral Point		1839	Fraternal meeting place	Wooden Greek Revival structure built as a meeting place for the Iowa Lodge No. 1 chapter of the Independent Order of Odd Fellows. Still used by the organization, it is reputed to be the oldest chapter west of the Allegheny Mountains. Part of the Mineral Point Historic District.
St. Peter's Catholic Church		Old World Wisconsin, Eagle	Milwaukee	1839	Church	The first Catholic Church in Milwaukee, originally named St. Luke's and located on the corner of Jackson Street and Martin Street (now State Street) in the East Town neighborhood. The building relocated to the grounds of Saint Francis de Sales Seminary c. 1940. It was later moved to the Old World Wisconsin open-air museum.
Blue house		Nashotah		1842	Academic	The Blue House was the first building of the Nashotah House Episcopal seminary, constructed in 1842 by the missionary James Lloyd Breck and his followers. The Chapel of St. Sylvanus, located next to the Blue House, was constructed in 1843.
Hickory Hill House		Madison		1842	Residential	Possibly the oldest extant building in Madison, Wisconsin, the Hickory Hill House was built from local sandstone by John G. Hicks, a farmer who came to Wisconsin from New York.
Benjamin Church House		Shorewood	Milwaukee	1843–1844	Residential	The oldest extant house in Milwaukee County. (Note: Milwaukee's oldest building was formerly the Morgan Burdick House, also known as the Daniel H. Richards House. Built between 1836 and 1841, the building was destroyed by fire in 2002.) Originally located on 4th Street in Downtown Milwaukee, the building was moved to Estabrook Park in 1939.
Middle College		Beloit		1847	Academic	The first building constructed on the Beloit College campus, Middle College is the oldest academic building still in use in Wisconsin and serves as the college's administrative offices.
North Hall		Madison		1851	Academic	Oldest extant building at the University of Wisconsin–Madison.
Pottawatomie Light		Rock Island		1858	Lighthouse	Oldest extant lighthouse in Wisconsin. Built in 1858 to replace an older structure from 1836.
Gates of Heaven Synagogue		Madison		1863	Synagogue	Oldest extant synagogue in Wisconsin and eighth-oldest synagogue building in the United States.
Unity Chapel		Wyoming		1886	Religious	Frank Lloyd Wright's earliest architectural work. Designed by Joseph Lyman Silsbee's Chicago architectural office in 1886. Wright designed the interior.

== See also ==
- List of lighthouses in Wisconsin
- List of the oldest buildings in the United States
- National Register of Historic Places listings in Wisconsin
