= Gratiot =

Gratiot may refer to:

== Places ==
- Gratiot, Ohio, a village
- Gratiot (town), Wisconsin, a town
- Gratiot, Wisconsin, a village
- Gratiot County, Michigan
  - Gratiot Community Airport
- Gratiot River, Michigan
- Lake Gratiot, Michigan

== Other uses ==
- Gratiot (surname)
- M-3 (Michigan highway), known for most of its length as Gratiot Avenue

== See also ==
- Fort Gratiot Township, Michigan
- Fort Gratiot Light, a lighthouse in Michigan
- Dunkirk Light, also known as Point Gratiot Light, a lighthouse on Lake Erie in New York State
- Gratiot Street Prison, an American Civil War prison in St. Louis, Missouri
- Gratiot's Grove (Wisconsin), a frontier mining settlement and fort
- Gratiot House, a house in Wisconsin
