= Rolette House =

Historic house in Wisconsin, United States

- U.S. National Register of Historic Places
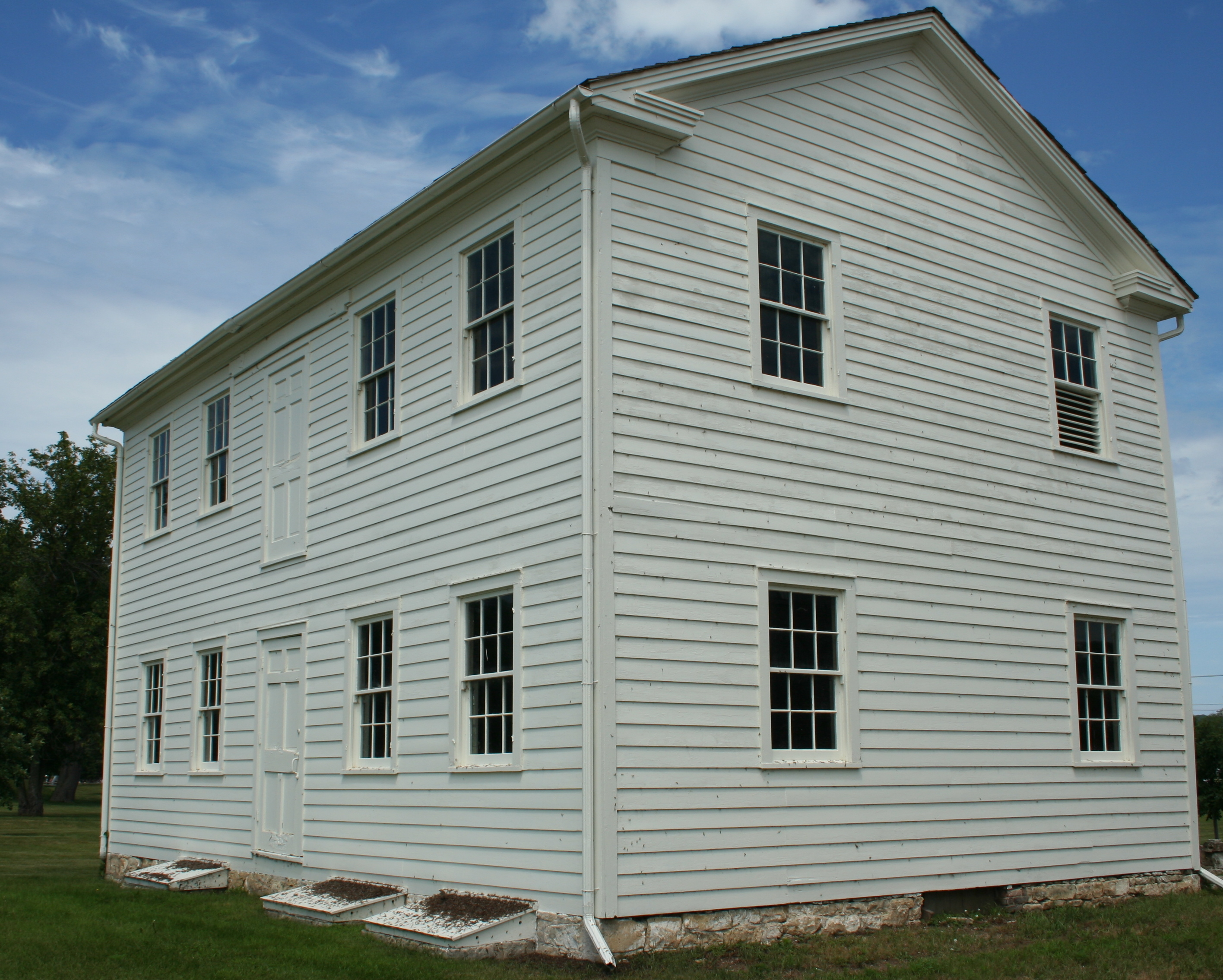
- Rolette House
- Location: NE corner of N. Water and Fisher Sts., Prairie du Chien, Wisconsin
- Coordinates: 43°03′14″N 91°09′33″W
- Area: 0.4 acres (0.16 ha)
- Architect: Jean Joseph Rolette
- Architectural style: Colonial, Federal, New England Colonial
- NRHP reference No.: 72000046
- Added to NRHP: February 1, 1972

The Rolette House is located in Prairie du Chien, Wisconsin.

== History ==
Construction of the house was begun by Jean Joseph Rolette, but he died before it was completed. Later, it was turned into a hotel and a boarding house. It was listed on the National Register of Historic Places in 1972 and on the State Register of Historic Places in 1989. The house is one of two properties connected to Rolette to be listed, along with the Brisbois House.
