= Vertefeuille =

Vertefeuille is a surname. Notable people with the surname include:

- Christine S. Vertefeuille (born 1950), American lawyer and judge
- Fabien Vanasse dit Vertefeuille (1850–1936), Canadian journalist, lawyer and politician
- Jeanne Vertefeuille (1932–2012), CIA officer who investigated Cold War spy Aldrich Ames

== See also ==
- Francois Vertefeuille House, historic house in Wisconsin, United States
