= Rolette =

Rolette can refer to:

- Jean Joseph Rolette, Joe Rolette the elder, fur trader
- Joe Rolette, fur trader, politician, Jean Joseph Rolette's son
- Rolette, North Dakota
- Rolette County, North Dakota
