= Gratiot (surname) =

Gratiot is a surname. Notable people with the surname include:

- Charles Gratiot, Sr. (1752–1817), French-American fur trapper
- Charles Gratiot (1786–1855), American military engineer, son of Charles Sr.
- Henry Gratiot (1789–1836), French-American pioneer, farmer, and mill owner, son of Charles Sr.
