= Francois Vertefeuille House =

Historic house in Wisconsin, United States

- U.S. National Register of Historic Places
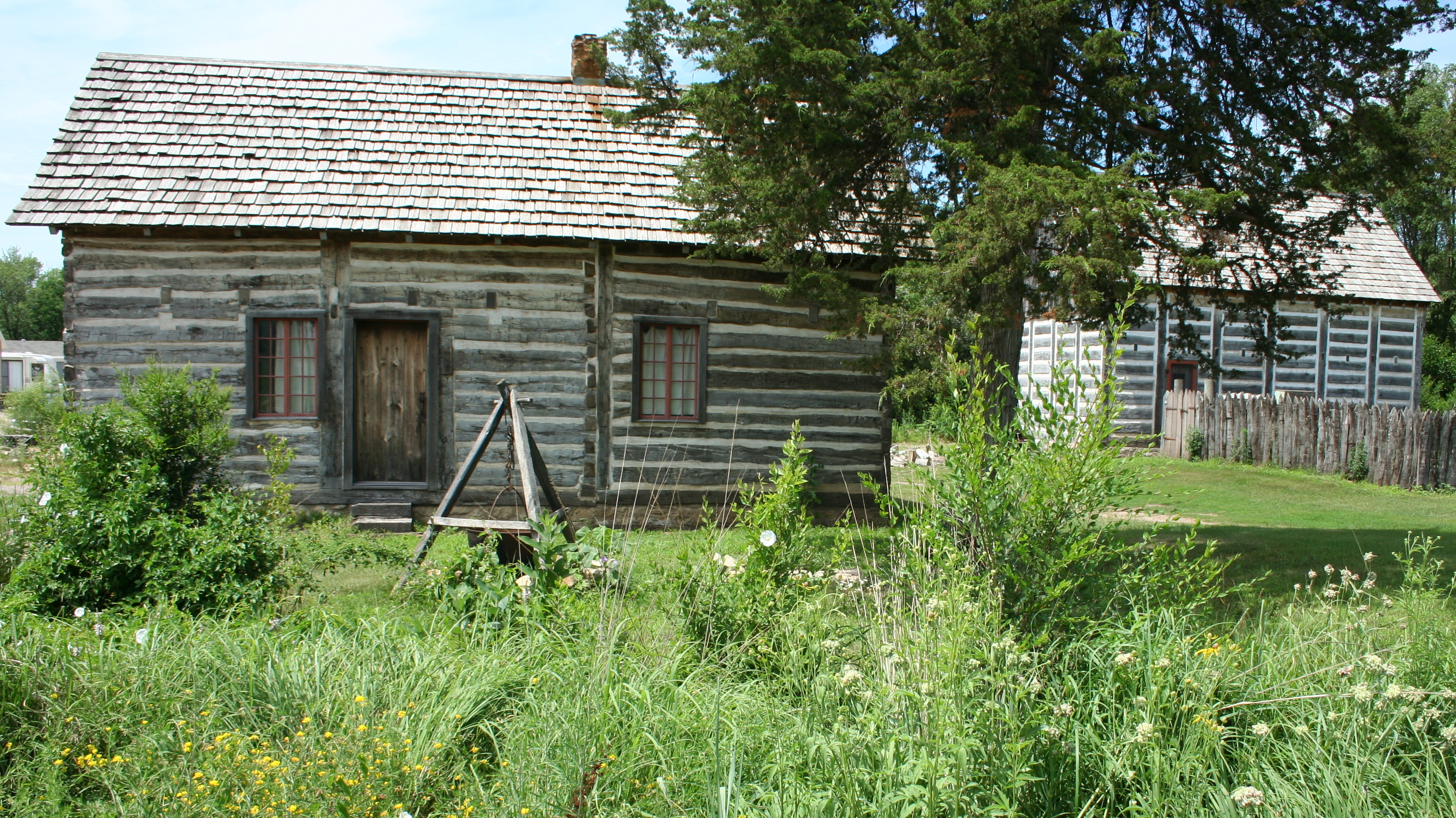
- Francois Vertefeuille House
- Location: Highway K Town of Prairie du Chien, Wisconsin
- Coordinates: 43°04′58″N 91°08′58″W
- Built: c. 1810
- Architectural style: Log House
- NRHP reference No.: 93000142
- Added to NRHP: March 18, 1993

The Francois Vertefeuille House is located in the Town of Prairie du Chien, Wisconsin, United States. It was added to the National Register of Historic Places in 1993. It is one of the oldest buildings in Wisconsin, and is designated as the oldest building in the state still located on its original site.

== History ==
The house was built between 1810 and 1820 using the pièce-sur-pièce à coulisse technique common in French-Canadian buildings of the time. It was expanded during the 1820s after it was bought by Francois Vertefeuille, who had originally moved to Prairie du Chien from The Canadas in 1809.

== See also ==
- List of the oldest buildings in Wisconsin
