= St. Germain dit Gauthier House =

Historic house in Wisconsin, United States

- U.S. National Register of Historic Places
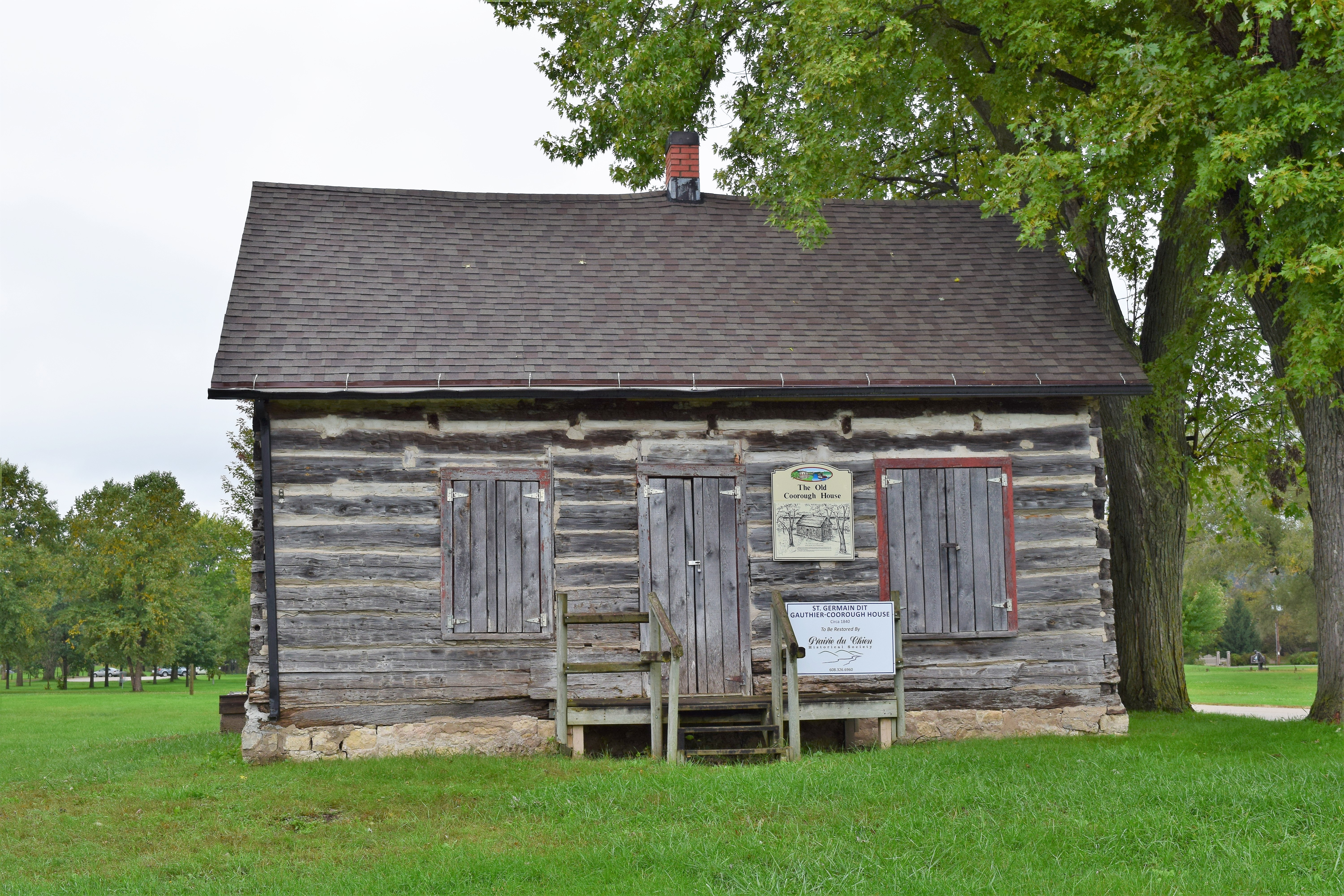
- St. Germain dit Gauthier House
- Location: 419 5th St. Prairie du Chien, Wisconsin
- Built: 1837/1916
- NRHP reference No.: 100002411
- Added to NRHP: May 10, 2018

The St. Germain dit Gauthier House is located in Prairie du Chien, Wisconsin.

== History ==
The house was built during the time of the Wisconsin Territory, prior to 1848. For the first several years of its existence, it belonged to Québécois immigrants. It originally belonged to Jean Baptiste Caron. Later, it was bought by Guillaume St. Germain. He and his wife, who has been named as either Madeline or Magdelaine, moved into it.

In 1890, Nina Dousman McBride bought the house. She rented it out to Charles Gremore. Gremore later bought the house and moved it to its present location, on an island in the Mississippi River in the late 19th or early 20th century. In 1902, George Coorough purchased it. An addition was added in 1916. The house remained in the Coorough family until 1978, when it was acquired by the City of Prairie du Chien.

It was added to the State Register of Historic Places in 2017 and to the National Register of Historic Places the following year.

== See also ==
- List of the oldest buildings in Wisconsin
