= Camp Smith (Wisconsin) =

19th-century fortification in Wisconsin, US

Coordinates: 44°28′29″N 88°02′03″W

- Green Bay, Wisconsin

Site information
- Type: Fort
- Controlled by: United States Army

Site history
- Built: 1820
- In use: 1820-1822

Garrison information
- Past commanders: Colonel Joseph Lee Smith

Camp Smith was a 19th-century fortification located on the east bank of the Fox River in Green Bay, Wisconsin. The installation was built as a temporary home for the garrison at nearby Fort Howard during a malaria outbreak.

== History ==
Colonel Joseph Lee Smith took command of nearby Fort Howard in 1820, the same time as a malaria outbreak in the area. Seeking to flee the outbreak, Colonel Smith decided to build a fort on the east bank of the Fox River. Later that year, Camp Smith was completed, and the garrison was moved there.

Colonel Smith left in 1821, and the new commander decided to move the garrison back to Fort Howard. Camp Smith was officially abandoned in 1822.

== Legacy ==
The installation was located at the present day site of Heritage Hill State Historical Park.
