= Gratiot House =

- U.S. National Register of Historic Places
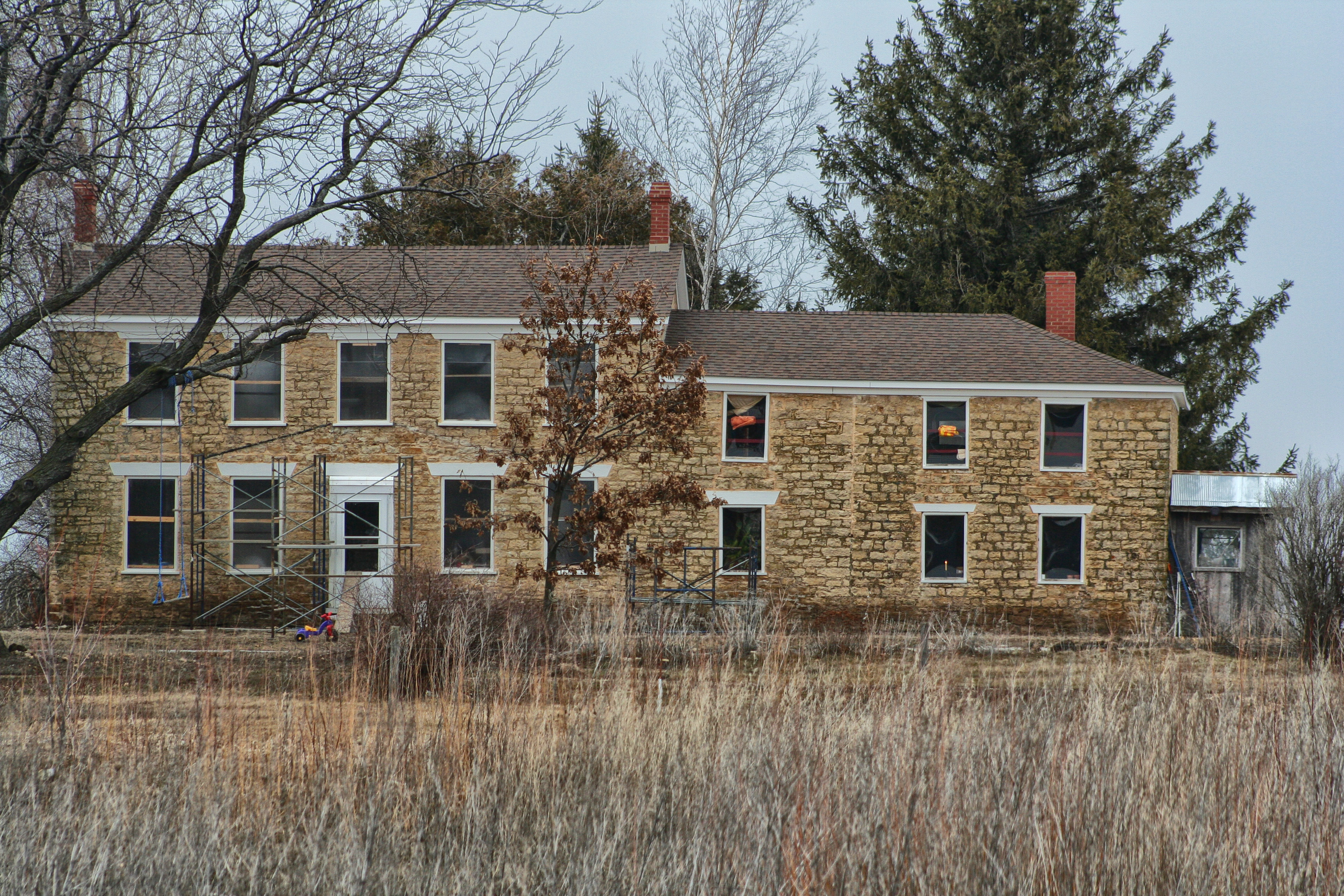

- Location within Wisconsin Location within the United States
- Location: South of Shullsburg on Rennick Rd., Lafayette County, Wisconsin
- Coordinates: 42.5525°N 90.231111°W
- Area: 3.5 acres (1.4 ha)
- Built: 1835
- Architectural style: Georgian
- NRHP reference No.: 80000153
- Added to NRHP: January 8, 1980

The Gratiot House, located about 2 miles (3.2 km) south of Shullsburg, Wisconsin is a Georgian-styled limestone house built by Henry Gratiot in 1835. It is the last remaining building of Gratiot Grove, one of the state's first settlements, a lead-mining outpost begun in Winnebago territory in 1826 on the stage road from Galena to Chicago. The house was listed on the National Register of Historic Places in 1980.

The house's exterior has been changed only by the c.1890 addition of porches on the south and west sides and later by the addition of a metal raised-seam roof and by the removal of cornice returns. The house is "imposing", standing out from the appearance of small farmhouses in the area. According to its NRHP nomination, it was also deemed significant "as an example of indigenous American building techniques of the nineteenth century. The coursed ashlar on the main facade and almost rubblestone surface on the remaining sides gives a rich texture to its simple form. Through the use of wood splayed lintels to emphasize the windows and doors, the builder showed a desire for originality. The house is the largest limestone residence in Lafayette County and recalls an era when Gratiot*s Grove was a thriving lead-mining settlement."

== See also ==
- List of the oldest buildings in Wisconsin
