= Henry Merrell House =

Historic house in Wisconsin, United States

- U.S. National Register of Historic Places
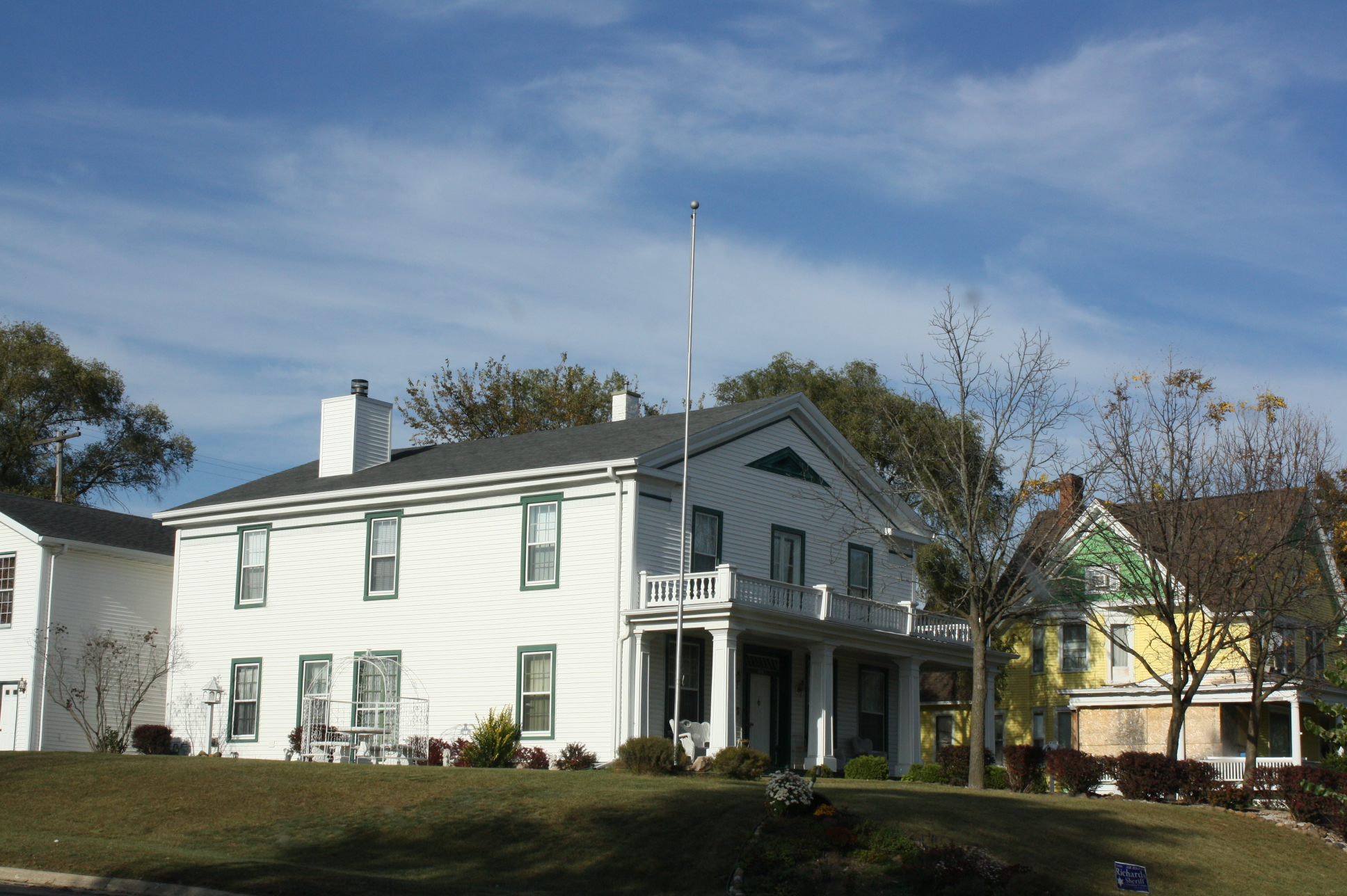
- Henry Merrell House
- Location: 505 E. Cook St., Portage, Wisconsin
- Coordinates: 43°32′34″N 89°27′13″W
- Area: less than one acre
- Built: 1835-1839
- Architectural style: Greek Revival
- NRHP reference No.: 93000545
- Added to NRHP: July 8, 1993

The Henry Merrell House is located in Portage, Wisconsin.

== History ==
The house was originally built for Henry Merrill (also spelled 'Merrell') in Fort Winnebago, Wisconsin, where it served as a residence and hotel, along with housing Merrill's mercantile business. Merrill the house moved to its current location in 1867. It was added to the State and the National Register of Historic Places in 1993.

== See also ==
- List of the oldest buildings in Wisconsin
