= White Corners, Wisconsin =

- Unincorporated community
- Location within Wisconsin Location within the United States
- Coordinates: 43°04′03″N 91°04′40″W
- Country: United States
- State: Wisconsin
- County: Crawford
- Town: Prairie du Chien
- Elevation: 1,207 ft (368 m)
- Time zone: UTC-6 (Central (CST))
  - Summer (DST): UTC-5 (CDT)
- Area code: 608
- GNIS feature ID: 1846488

White Corners is an unincorporated community, a rural agricultural hamlet approximately two miles east northeast of the Prairie du Chien city limits, Crawford County, Wisconsin, United States
