= Strange Powers House =

Historic house in Wisconsin, United States

- U.S. National Register of Historic Places
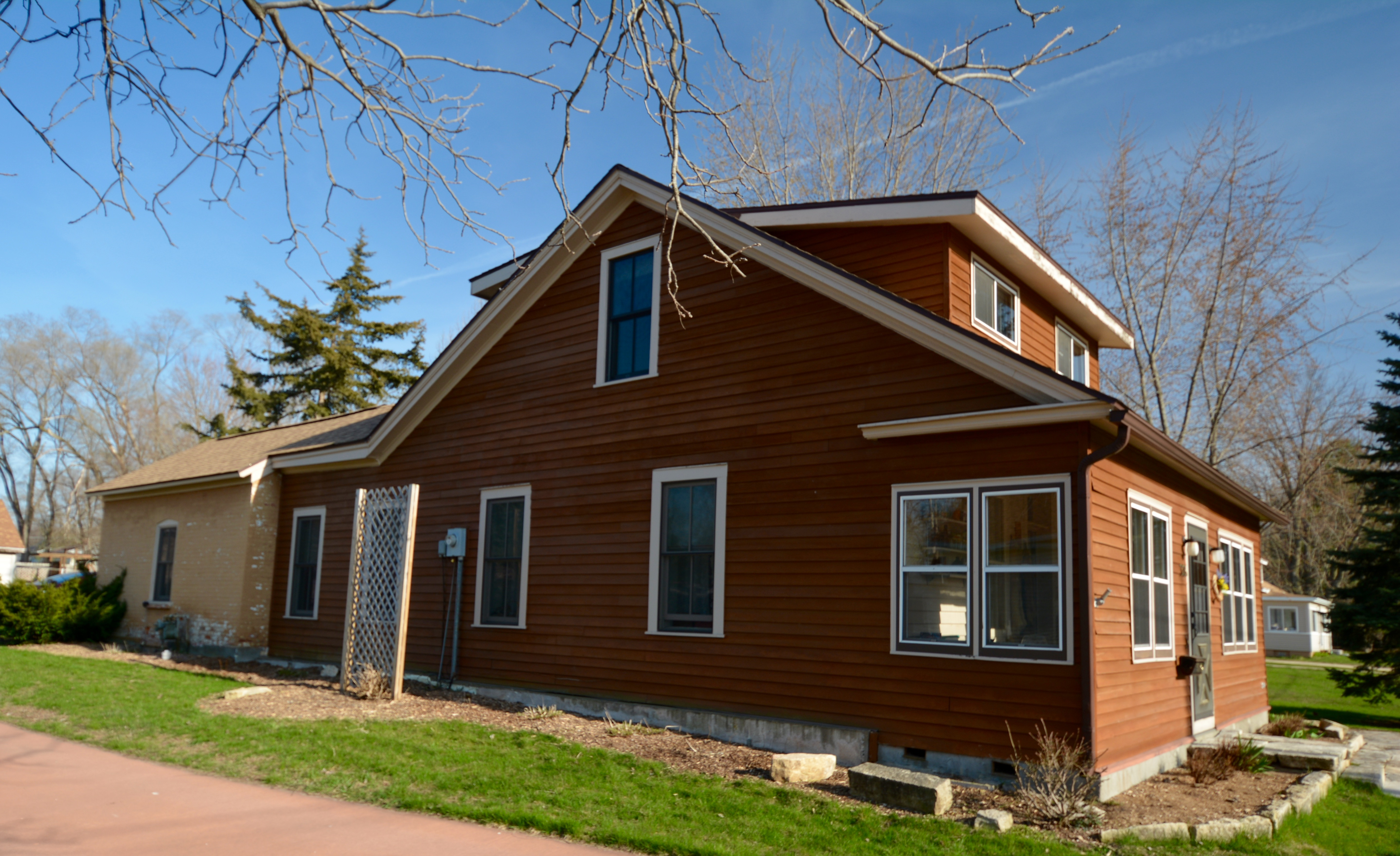

- Location within Wisconsin Location within the United States
- Location: 338 N. Main St. Prairie du Chien, Wisconsin
- Coordinates: 43°3′21″N 91°8′54″W
- Area: 0.24 acres (0.097 ha)
- Built: 1818-1824
- NRHP reference No.: 79000067
- Added to NRHP: August 27, 1979

The Strange Powers House is a historic house located at 338 North Main Street in Prairie du Chien, Wisconsin, United States. It is historically significant as a rare example of fur-trade period French colonial style architecture which has survived intact and on its original site.

== Description and history ==
The timber and log structure is a characteristic example of French-Canadian piece sur piece a tenon en coulisse construction. It was added to the National Register of Historic Places on August 27, 1979.

== See also ==
- List of the oldest buildings in Wisconsin
