= Jean Joseph Rolette =

Member of the Mackinac Company and prominent fur trader

Jean Joseph Rolette (September 24, 1781 – December 3, 1842), often known as Joseph Rolette, was a fur trader and member of the Mackinac Company who operated a trading post in Prairie du Chien, Wisconsin.

== Youth and early career ==
Rolette was born in Quebec in 1781 to ethnic French parents. As a young man he trained for the priesthood at a Jesuit seminary there, but he did not complete his studies.

After leaving the seminary, he became involved in the fur trade. He worked briefly in Windsor, Ontario before establishing a trading post for the Mackinac Company in the remote village of Prairie du Chien sometime between 1801 and 1805, in what is now the state of Wisconsin in the United States. In 1811, the Mackinac Company was reorganized as the South West Company, and Rolette became a major partner in the business. It is believed he had two partners in 1815, when the company was acquired by American John Jacob Astor. Astor's American Fur Company established a monopoly in this region and much of the West.

=== First marriage and family ===
In 1807, Rolette married 14-year-old Marguerite Dubois, the "mixed-blood" daughter of Antoine Dubois; her mother was the sister of Chief Wabasha II. They had at least two daughters, Emilie (later known as Emilie Rolette Hooe) and Elizabeth Rolette. Marguerite died in 1817.

== War of 1812 and after ==
During the War of 1812, Rolette, like many other French-Canadian fur traders in the Old Northwest, was an active supporter of the British Empire against the United States. He participated in the British capture of Mackinac Island in the Siege of Fort Mackinac, and later commanded a British militia unit in the Siege of Prairie du Chien.

Animosity between Rolette and the Americans at Prairie du Chien continued for some time after the war. Canadian fur traders on the other side of the border were no longer granted licenses by the US government and were cut off from many of their clients.

Despite this, in 1821 Rolette was appointed as an associate justice of Crawford County, Wisconsin. In 1830 he briefly served as chief justice of the county.

=== Second marriage and family ===
Rolette married Jane Fisher in 1818. She was a local woman twenty-three years his junior. She was related to noted fur trader Michel Brisbois. The couple had had two children during the 1820s, Joseph, who was elected to the Minnesota Territorial Legislature in 1851, and Virginia.

== Entrepreneur ==
Meanwhile, Rolette's business continued to prosper. In 1820 Rolette made an alliance with Astor's powerful American Fur Company and became the company's sole agent in Prairie du Chien. This, coupled with numerous investments in real estate, propelled Rolette to become the wealthiest man in the village, and he was often called "King Rolette" by his friends. Among the American Indians with whom he traded, he was known as "Five More" because he would always try to bargain for five more furs.

However, in 1826, Rolette's authority began to wane as Hercules L. Dousman arrived in Prairie du Chien to work for the American Fur Company. The two operated as equal partners for some time, but Dousman slowly came to rise past Rolette in the business.

In 1836, Jane Fisher Rolette became the first woman in Wisconsin Territory to file for divorce, but she backed off and settled for a legal separation instead. As part of the separation contract, Joseph Rolette agreed to construct his wife a two-story stone house on the riverfront in Prairie du Chien. Known as the Brisbois House, this structure is now a National Historic Landmark and is owned by the Wisconsin Historical Society.

In the Panic of 1837, Rolette lost significant wealth and became indebted to Dousman and the American Fur Company. Then in 1842 the American Fur Company declared bankruptcy, and in order to continue in the trade Rolette entered into a joint venture with Dousman, Henry Hastings Sibley, and Pierre Chouteau to organize a new company which would take its place on the upper Mississippi. While Rolette was given an ownership stake in the new company, he was not given any control over its operation. Only a few months later, Rolette died in debt to the new company, and most of his estate was seized by the remaining partners. Dousman also married Rolette's widow Jane Fisher Rolette two years later. Rolette's estate was sold at a sheriff's sale (i.e., public auction) in 1845.

At the time of his death, Rolette was building what would become known as the Rolette House.
