= Fort Howard Officers' Quarters =

- U.S. National Register of Historic Places
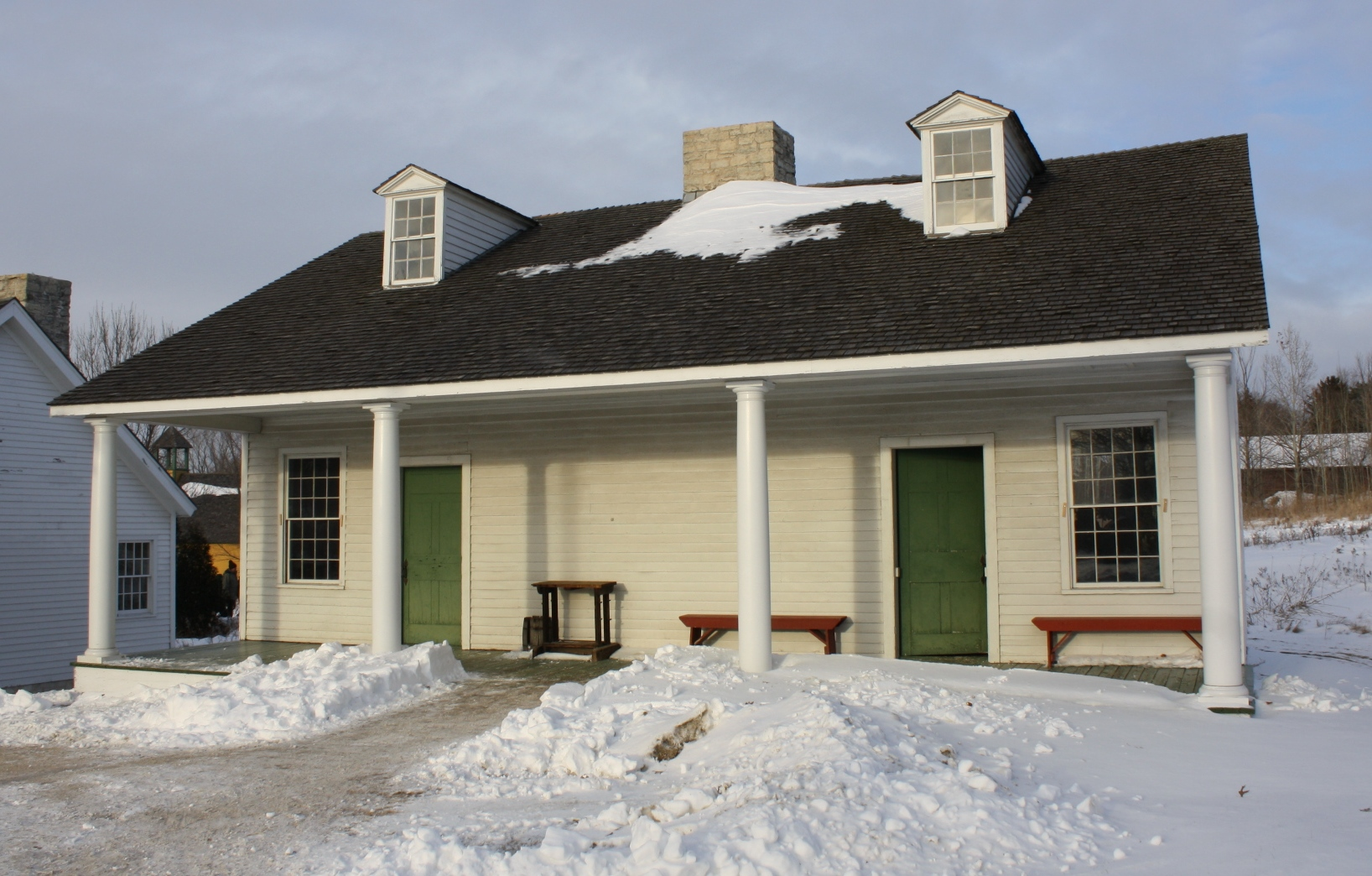
- Location: Heritage Hill State Park, 2640 S. Webster Ave., Green Bay, Wisconsin
- Coordinates: 44°28′26″N 88°02′04″W
- Area: 0.3 acres (0.12 ha)
- Built: 1816
- NRHP reference No.: 72001548
- Added to NRHP: July 22, 1979

The Fort Howard Officers' Quarters, in Heritage Hill State Park at 2640 S. Webster Ave. in Green Bay, Wisconsin, were built in c.1816 or in 1830, according to various sources. They were listed on the National Register of Historic Places in 1979.

It is an 1830 Federal-style building, in which Fort Howard's officers lived with their families. This building is currently interpreted at the park as the Company Kitchen/Orderly Room. The structure at the park named Fort Howard Officers' Quarters is a reproduction built in 1982.

Is an original Fort Howard building, built c. 1816, which served as the kitchen of the commanding officer's quarters. It is a one-and-a-half-story building with two pedimented roof dormers. It was moved around 1866-1869 to Green Bay to serve as a house there, and was not altered much besides addition of a porch and a lean-to shed. In 1952 it was given to the Brown County Historical Society, which gave it to the City of Green Bay. It was later moved to the grounds of the Old Fort Howard Hospital and restored, including removal of the porch and lean-to.

== See also ==
- List of the oldest buildings in Wisconsin
