= Fort Howard Hospital =

- U.S. National Register of Historic Places
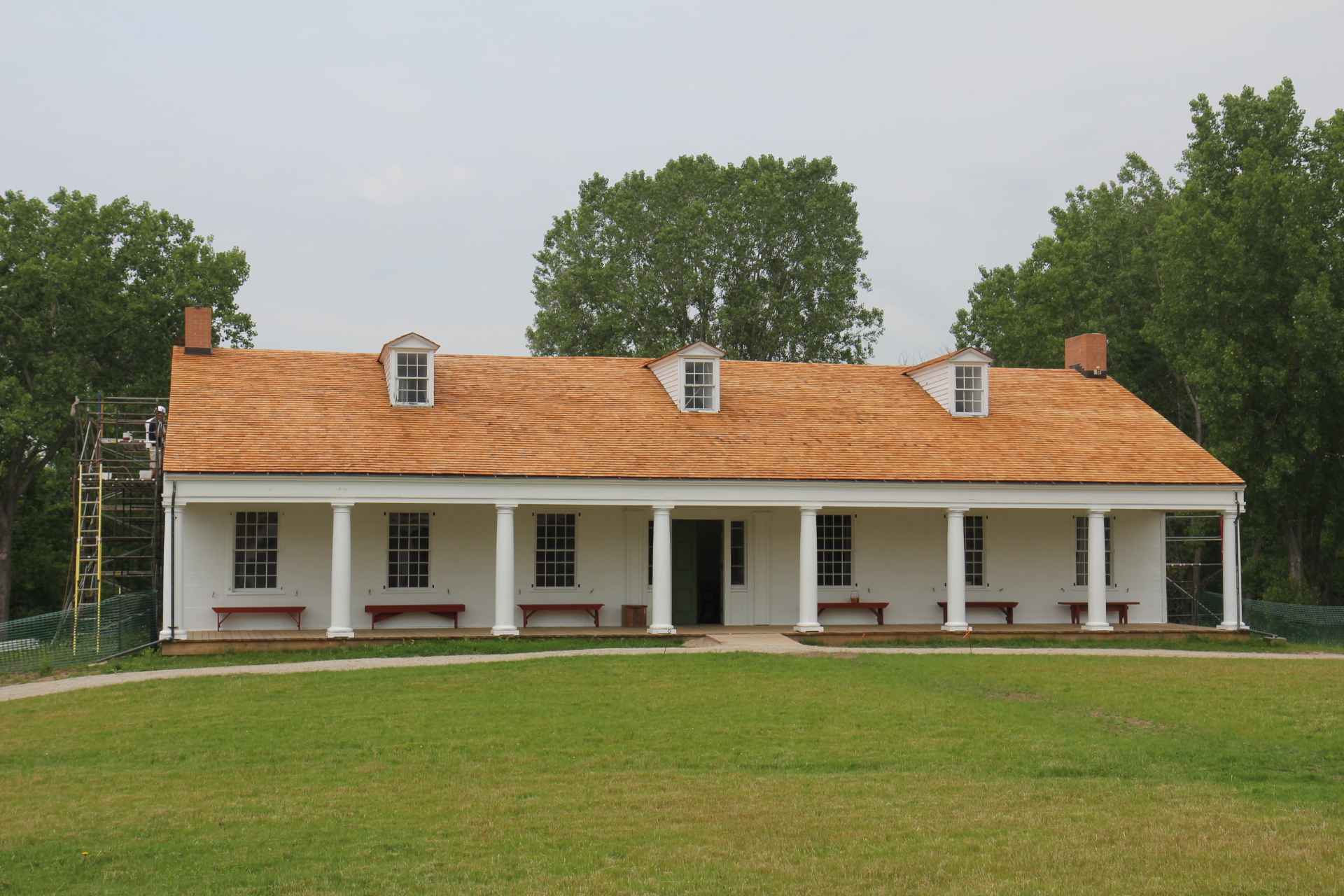
- Fort Howard Hospital during 2014 roof restoration
- Location: 2640 S. Webster Ave. Green Bay, Wisconsin
- Coordinates: 44.47416°N 88.03419°W
- Architectural style: Federal
- NRHP reference No.: 71001075
- Added to NRHP: July 22, 1979

Fort Howard Hospital is located within the Heritage Hill State Historical Park in Green Bay, Wisconsin. It was added to the National Register of Historic Places in 1979 for its historical significance in architectural, military and social history.

== History ==
The United States Army built the hospital in the 1830s for Fort Howard. After the fort's decommissioning, the building was moved to the corner of Kellogg Street and Chestnut Street and was used as a private residence. In 1975, it was moved to its current location. Currently, it serves as a museum.

== See also ==
- List of the oldest buildings in Wisconsin
