= Brisbois House =

Historic house in Wisconsin, United States

- U.S. National Register of Historic Places
- U.S. National Historic Landmark
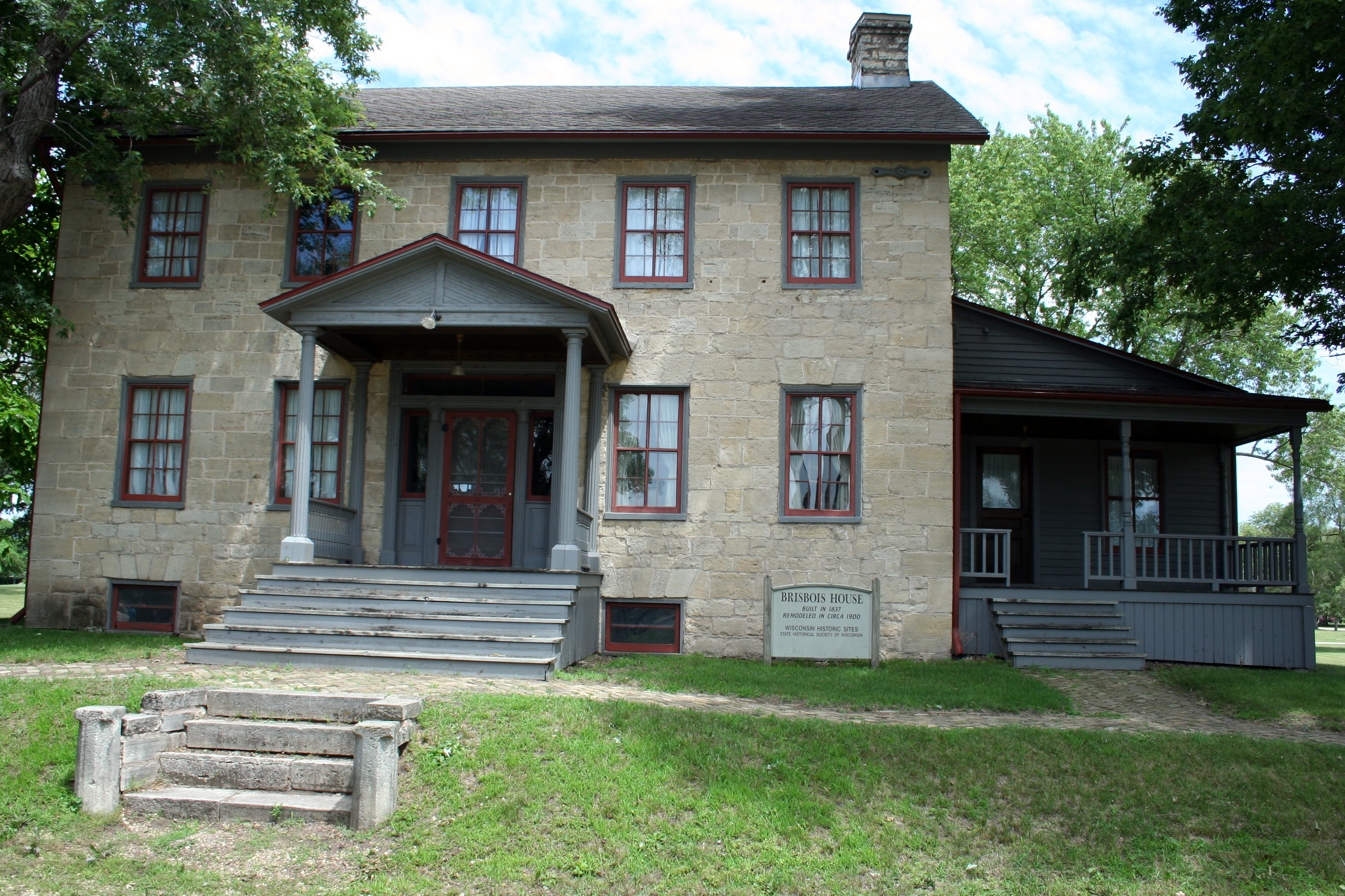

- Location within Wisconsin Location within the United States
- Location: Prairie du Chien, Wisconsin
- Coordinates: 43°3′15″N 91°9′35″W
- Built: 1840
- Architectural style: Federal
- NRHP reference No.: 66000801

Significant dates
- Added to NRHP: October 15, 1966
- Designated NHL: October 9, 1960

The Brisbois House, also known as the Bernard Brisbois House, is a historic house located on St. Feriole Island in Prairie du Chien, Wisconsin. Built circa 1840, the stone house is one of the oldest in Wisconsin. It was once thought to be built in 1808 by early settler and fur trader Michael Brisbois, but in the early 1920s, historians learned that it was built by his son after his death. The house is a National Historic Landmark and is now owned by the Wisconsin Historical Society.

== Appearance ==
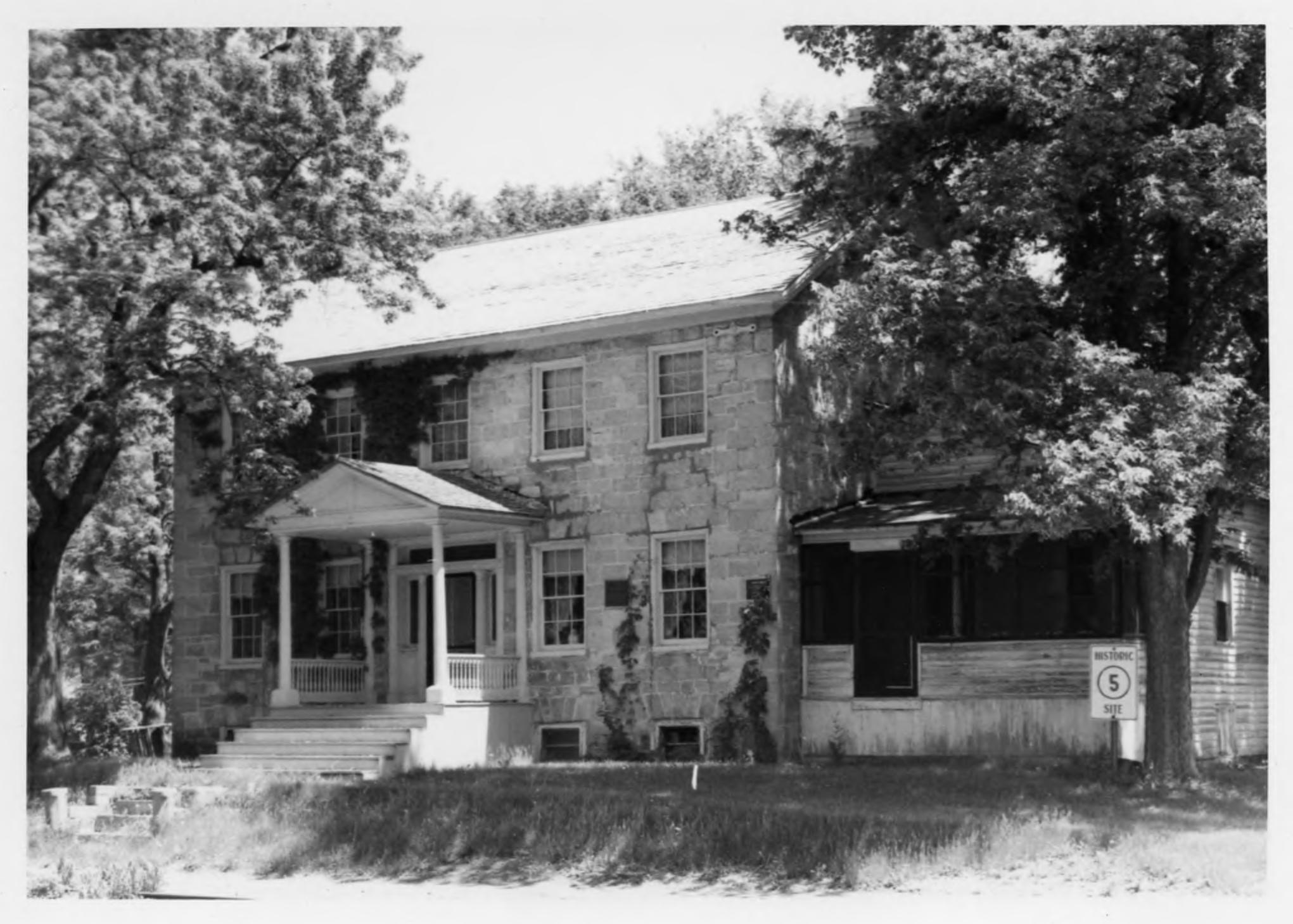
The house in 1975

The Brisbois House is two-and-a-half stories tall and built from locally extracted gray limestone. The front facade has five bays, with a central entrance and two pairs of windows on either side. Fluted Doric columns flank the front entrance, and molded trim forms the rest of the doorway; the lightness of these features reflects a Federal influence. A front porch, a later addition, covers the entrance with a pediment supported by columns, which match the doorway. A gable roof with chimneys at either end tops the house. A wooden addition was placed on the south side of the house in 1905, replacing a platform which wrapped around that side.

== History ==
The Brisbois House was traditionally thought to have been built in 1808 by Michael(Michel) Brisbois, an early settler and fur trader of Prairie du Chien and one of the city's first prominent businessmen. Brisbois owned the plot of land the house is built on.

In the 1950s the Wisconsin Historical Society determined that the house was built after Bisbois's death in 1833. According to the investigation, Michael's son Bernard Walter Brisbois most likely built the house for himself and his widowed mother circa 1840. While a building of the house's style and permanence would have been uncommon in the early 1800s, it fits the 1840s pattern of more elaborate homes being built for wealthy Prairie du Chien residents. It is one of the most well-crafted extant homes in the city which dates from before 1850, and it is one of the oldest standing stone houses in Wisconsin. The house was documented by the Historic American Buildings Survey in 1934, purchased by the Wisconsin Historical Society circa 1955, and designated as a National Historic Landmark in 1960.

== See also ==
- List of National Historic Landmarks in Wisconsin
- List of the oldest buildings in Wisconsin
- National Register of Historic Places listings in Crawford County, Wisconsin
