= George DeGraw Moore =

18th century American politician, Member of the Wisconsin Senate

Member of the Wisconsin Senate from the 2nd district
- In office January 1, 1850 – January 1, 1852
- Preceded by: Henry Merrill
- Succeeded by: James S. Alban

Personal details
- Born: George DeGraw Moore; February 11, 1822 Caldwell, New Jersey
- Died: October 13, 1891 (aged 69) Newark, New Jersey
- Resting place: Rosedale Cemetery; Orange, New Jersey
- Party: Whig
- Spouses: Justina Melrose Whitehead; (died 1887)
- Education: Union College

George DeGraw Moore (February 11, 1822 – October 13, 1891) was an American politician, lawyer, and jurist. He was sometimes referred to in historical documents as "G. DeGraw Moore" or "J. DeGraw Moore."

== Biography ==
Born in Caldwell, New Jersey, Moore received his law degree from Union College, in Schenectady, New York, and studied law in a law office in Newark, New Jersey. Moore settled in Prairie du Sac, Wisconsin. He served in the Wisconsin State Senate in 1850 and 1851. In 1851, Moore moved to Urbana, Ohio. In 1856, Moore moved back to Newark, New Jersey. From 1869 to 1879, he served as surrogate for Essex County, New Jersey. He also served on the first board of directors of the Prudential Friendly Society, a predecessor to the Prudential Life Insurance Company.
