= Henry Merrill =

American politician, member of the first Wisconsin State Senate

Member of the Wisconsin Senate from the 2nd district
- In office June 5, 1848 – January 9, 1850
- Preceded by: Position Established
- Succeeded by: George DeGraw Moore

Personal details
- Born: August 7, 1804 Utica, New York
- Died: May 5, 1876 (aged 71) Portage, Wisconsin
- Cause of death: heart disease
- Party: Whig
- Occupation: businessman, politician

Henry Merrill (also spelled "Merrell") (August 7, 1804 – May 5, 1876) was an American merchant and pioneer of the U.S. state of Wisconsin. He was a member of the first session of the Wisconsin State Senate in 1848. His former home in Portage, Wisconsin, is listed on the National Register of Historic Places. Late in life, he wrote an essay of pioneer life in Wisconsin for the Wisconsin Historical Society.

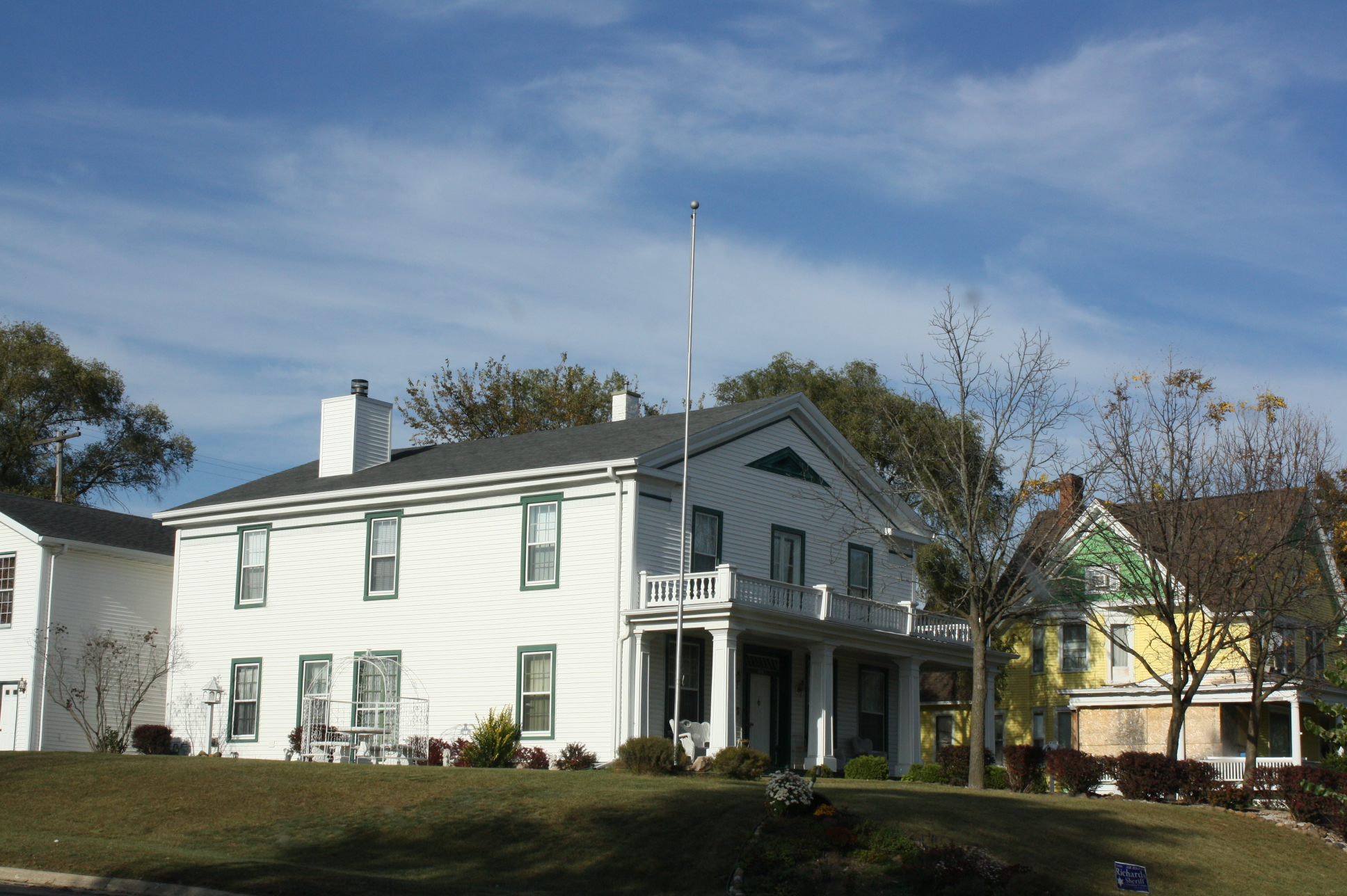
Merrill's house

Wisconsin Senate District 2 in 1848.

== Biography ==
Merrill was born in Utica, New York, in 1804, and moved with his family to Sackett's Harbor in 1819.

In 1834 he was appointed sutler and postmaster of Fort Winnebago, in the Wisconsin Territory, and he served as a superintendent of the Bank of Wisconsin, which was established in 1835.

He arrived in Wisconsin at Green Bay in the spring of 1834. There he met and became acquainted with several notable early Wisconsin settlers, including future territorial governor James Duane Doty, future congressional delegate Morgan Lewis Martin, entrepreneur Daniel Whitney, and pioneer Ebenezer Childs. Ultimately, he established a supply route for shipping his goods to Fort Winnebago up the Fox River from Green Bay. After arriving at Fort Winnebago, Merrill remained in the area for the rest of his life.

Merrill witnessed the effects of the Winnebago Treaty of 1837, signed November 1, 1837, in which members of the Ho-Chunk (or Winnebago) nation were defrauded into handing over their lands by 1845. He helped conduct the 1840 United States census within the Wisconsin Territory, and was clerk of court in Portage County in 1842.

In 1848, Merrill was elected as a Whig to a two-year term in the first and second sessions of the Wisconsin State Senate, defeating Democrat and future Governor James T. Lewis. Merrill was one of only three Whigs in the Senate in the first session. He represented the 2nd senatorial district, which, at the time, comprised a large tract of north and central Wisconsin, stretching from the northern boundary of Dane County up to the northern border of the state.

In 1857, Merrill witnessed a mob attempting to lynch John Baptiste DuBay after he shot and killed William S. Reynolds in Portage. Merrill later wrote his account of the events.

Merrill died in 1876. He was a member of the Episcopal Church in Portage. His house was listed on the National Register of Historic Places in 1993.

== Works ==
- Merrell, Henry (1876). "Pioneer Life in Wisconsin". Collections of the State Historical Society of Wisconsin. 7. E. B. Bolens, State Printer: 366–404.

Wisconsin Senate
New state government	Member of the Wisconsin Senate from the 2nd district June 5, 1848 – January 9, 1850	Succeeded by George DeGraw Moore
