= Bernard Walter Brisbois =

Bernard Walter Brisbois (October 4, 1808 – June 15, 1885) was an agent for the American Fur Company.

== History ==
Bernard Brisbois was born in Prairie du Chien, Illinois Territory in 1808, to Michel Brisbois, a French-Canadian voyageur, and his second wife Domitelle (Madelaine) Gautier de Verville.

Like his father, Brisbois also began his career in the fur trade, working as agent for the American Fur Company. Bernard married Thérèse Lachappelle [daughter of metis Pélagie LaPointe (herself the daughter of Pierre Lapointe and Etoukasahwee) and Antoine Lachapelle]. Later he engaged in the mercantile business in Prairie du Chien until 1873 when he was appointed consul at Verviers, Belgium. He returned to Prairie du Chien in 1874 and lived there until his death in 1885.

Etoukasahwee's parents are listed as Gaa-dawaabide (Broken Tooth or DeBreche) and Obenege shipequay. Gaa-dawaabide was a long-time Ojibwe chief of the Sandy Lake village, whose family belonged to the Aan'aawenh (Pintail) doodem or clan. Gaa-dawaabide (1750–1828), son of Biauswah II, was at the taking of Michilimackinac. He married Obeneg eshipequag. His sons were Maangozid (Loons Foot), Gaa-nandawaawinzo (Ripe berry hunter) and Zagataagan (Spunk) and daughters Charlotte, who married Charles Oakes Ermitinger, Nancy (Keneesequa) born 1793 married 1822/23 Samuel Ashmun and a daughter who married Hole in the Day. He was principal spokesperson at Sandy Lake before 1805. The name DeBreche attributed to him is likely one of his sons as it was used at the signing of treaty in 1837 at Fort Snelling after his death.

Bernard Brisbois is buried at Brisbois Cemetery on a bluff above Prairie du Chien.

== Brisbois Store ==
Located on St. Feriole Island in the city of Prairie du Chien, the historical Brisbois Store was built in 1851-52 by Bernard Brisbois. According to the Wisconsin Historical Society, the stone building sits on land with a long association with the North American fur trade. Prior to the War of 1812, the property was owned by a number of prominent traders and companies. During the War a log structure on the property was used by U.S. soldiers for housing while nearby Fort Shelby was under construction. After the War, the property became the site of a U.S. Fur Factory. In the 1820s the land was sold to the American Fur Company who held it until its sale to Bernard Brisbois in 1850. Through much of the twentieth century the building was known as the Riverside Boat Repair. The Brisbois Store was acquired by the Wisconsin Historical Society in the 1970s and was established as the Fur Trade Museum. The Brisbois Store is listed as a National Historic Landmark and on the National Register of Historic Places.

== Brisbois House (II) ==
For Brisbois House (I), see Michel Brisbois House

Also located on St. Feriole Island, the second Brisbois House was built by Joseph Rolette as part of a separation contract negotiated in 1836 for his estranged wife, Jane Fisher Rolette. The limestone house was erected on property owned by Jane's maternal relatives, the Brisbois. The limestone for the building came from the surplus stone sold by the United States government after the construction of Fort Crawford.

After Rolette's death, Jane married his business partner, Hercules Dousman, and transferred the property to her cousin, Bernard Brisbois, and the house remained in his family until the end of the 1900s. In the 1950s the Cornelius family restored the residence and gave the property to the Wisconsin Historical Society. Like the Brisbois Store, the second Brisbois House is listed as National Historic Landmark and on the National Register of Historic Places.
