= Fort Howard (Wisconsin) =

19th-century fort at Green Bay, Wisconsin

Coordinates: 44°31′N 88°1′W

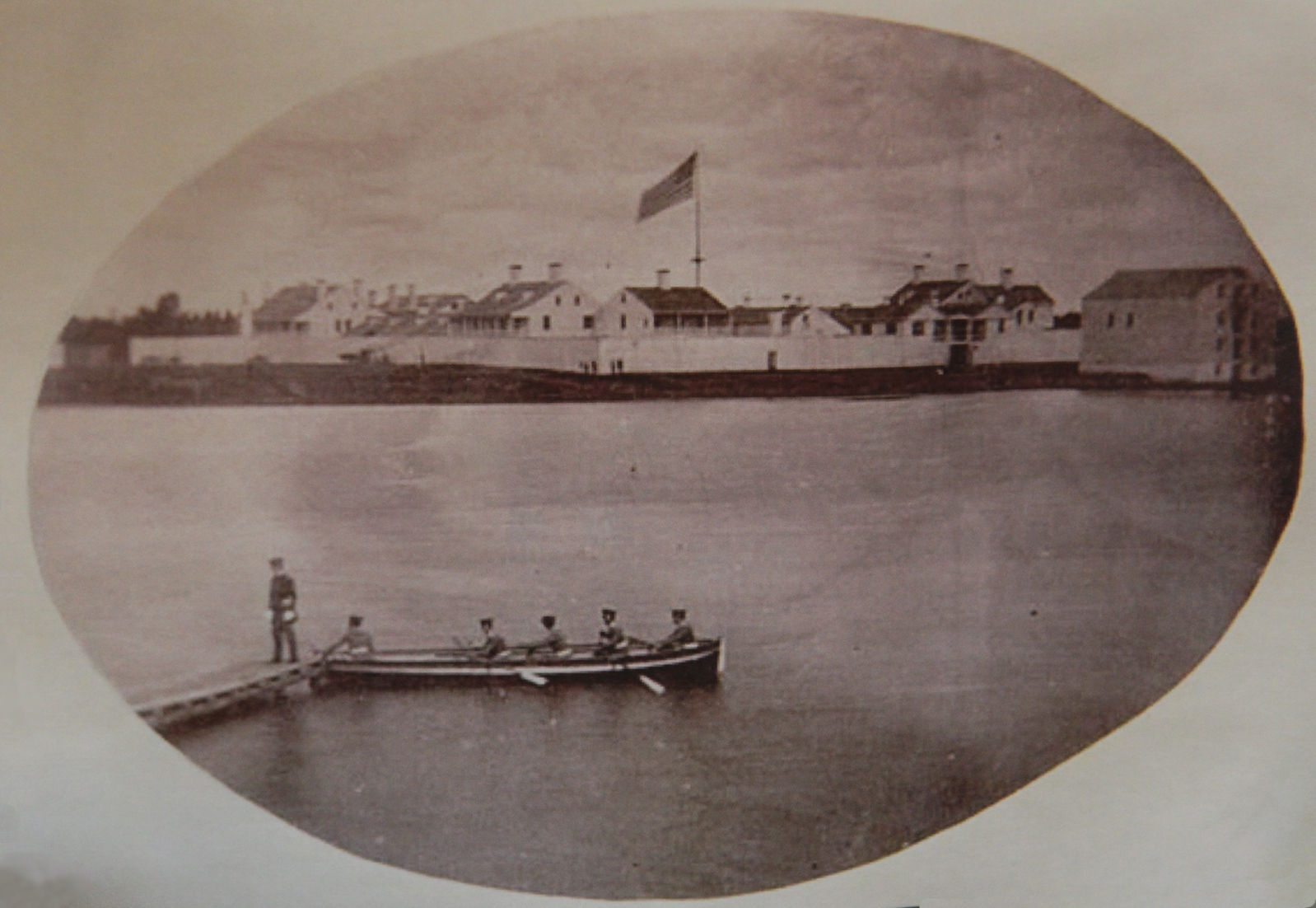
Fort Howard from the Fox River

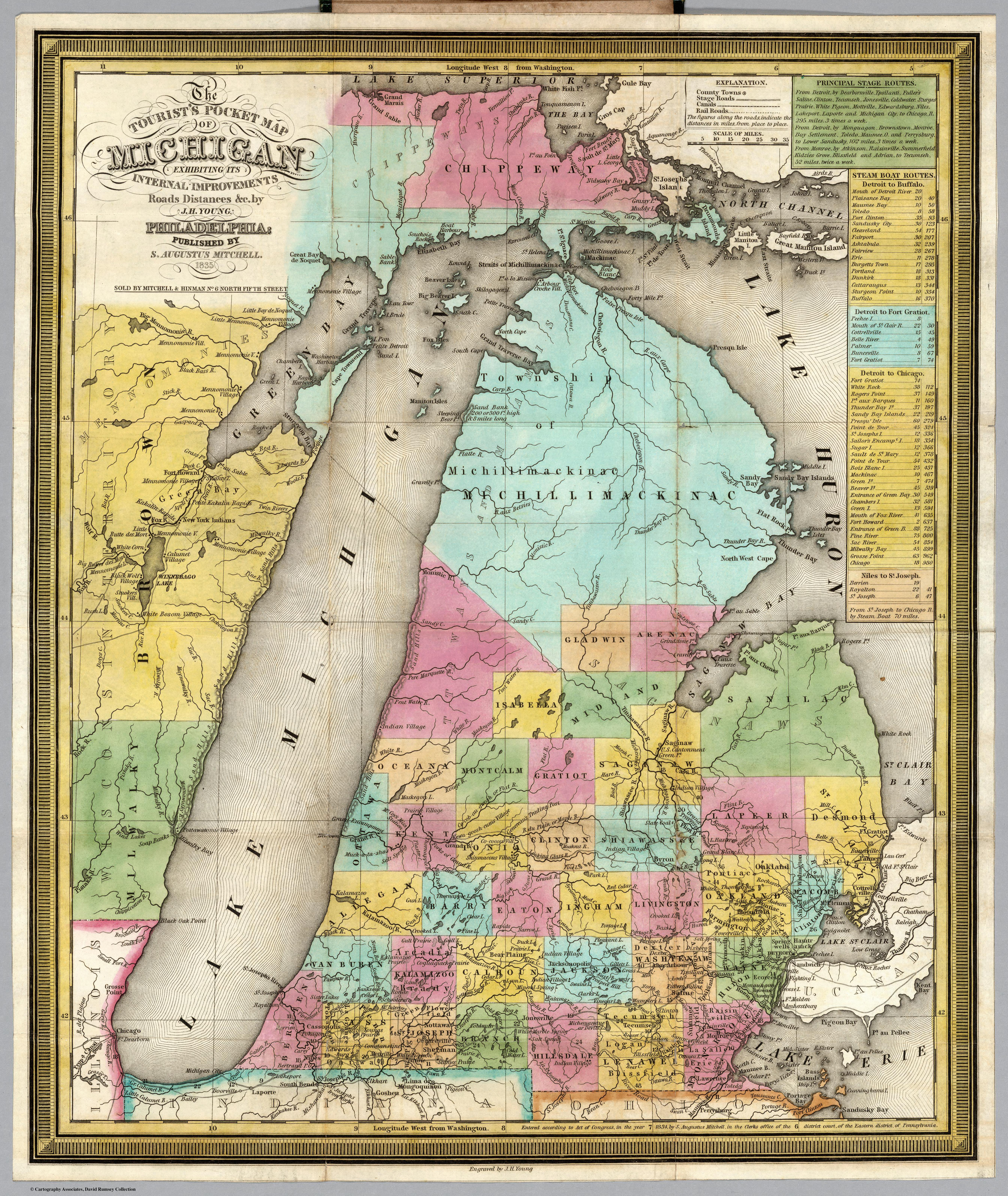
Fort Howard on the 1835 Tourist's Pocket Map of Michigan among the "Mennomonie" villages of Wisconsin Territory

Fort Howard was a 19th-century fortification in the north central United States, built by the U.S. Army. It was located along the west bank of the Fox River in Green Bay, Wisconsin.

== History ==
Along with Fort Crawford at Prairie du Chien, Fort Howard was constructed during the War of 1812 to protect the Fox-Wisconsin Waterway, an important regional trade and travel route between Lake Michigan and the Mississippi River, from British invasion. The fort was built at the site of the earlier French Fort La Baye (and renamed Fort Edward Augustus by the British in 1761). The initial estimate of its building cost was $16,644.70. (Military History of the Upper Great Lakes) For a time it was commanded by Zachary Taylor.

During an outbreak of malaria in 1820, the garrison moved to Camp Smith on higher ground nearby. Fort Howard was reoccupied two years later. Abandoned again in 1841, when the garrison was sent to Florida during the Seminole Wars, the fort was officially decommissioned in 1853.

In 1863, the United States government granted land to the States of Michigan and Wisconsin for construction of a military road between Fort Howard and Fort Wilikins near Copper Harbor, Michigan. This road was completed in 1872.

34-star American flag raised over the fort

Following the fort's closure its buildings fell into decay. Several structures were subsequently removed to the Camp Smith site, where they are now part of the Heritage Hill State Historical Park. Three of the fort's remaining structures are listed on the National Register of Historic Places: the hospital, hospital ward, and officers' quarters.

== Later use of name ==
In the 20th century, the Fort Howard Paper Company was a pulp and paper manufacturer based in Green Bay, founded by Austin E. Cofrin in 1919. It merged with James River in 1997 to form Fort James Corporation and became part of Georgia-Pacific in 2000.

== Images ==
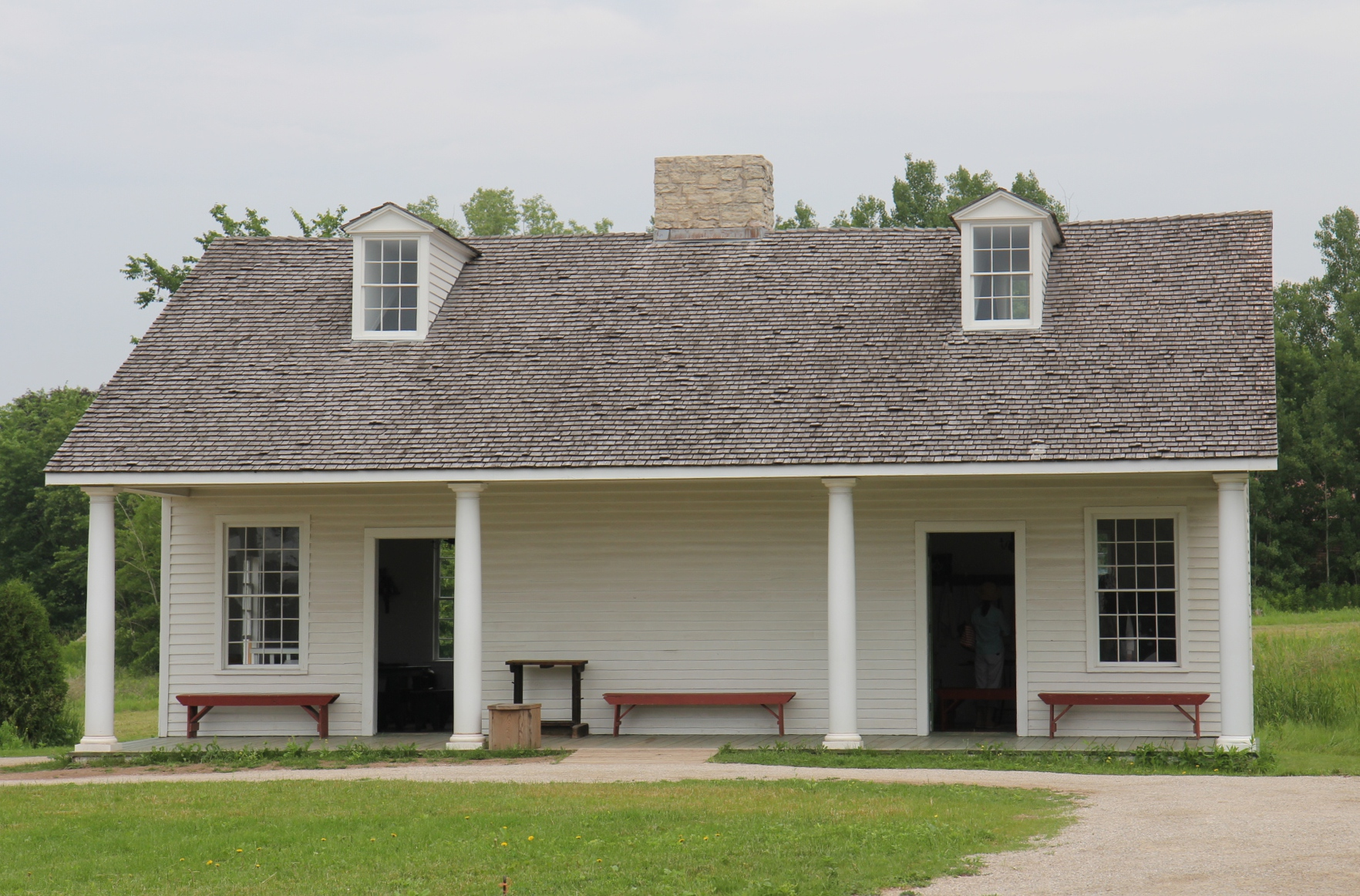
Kitchen

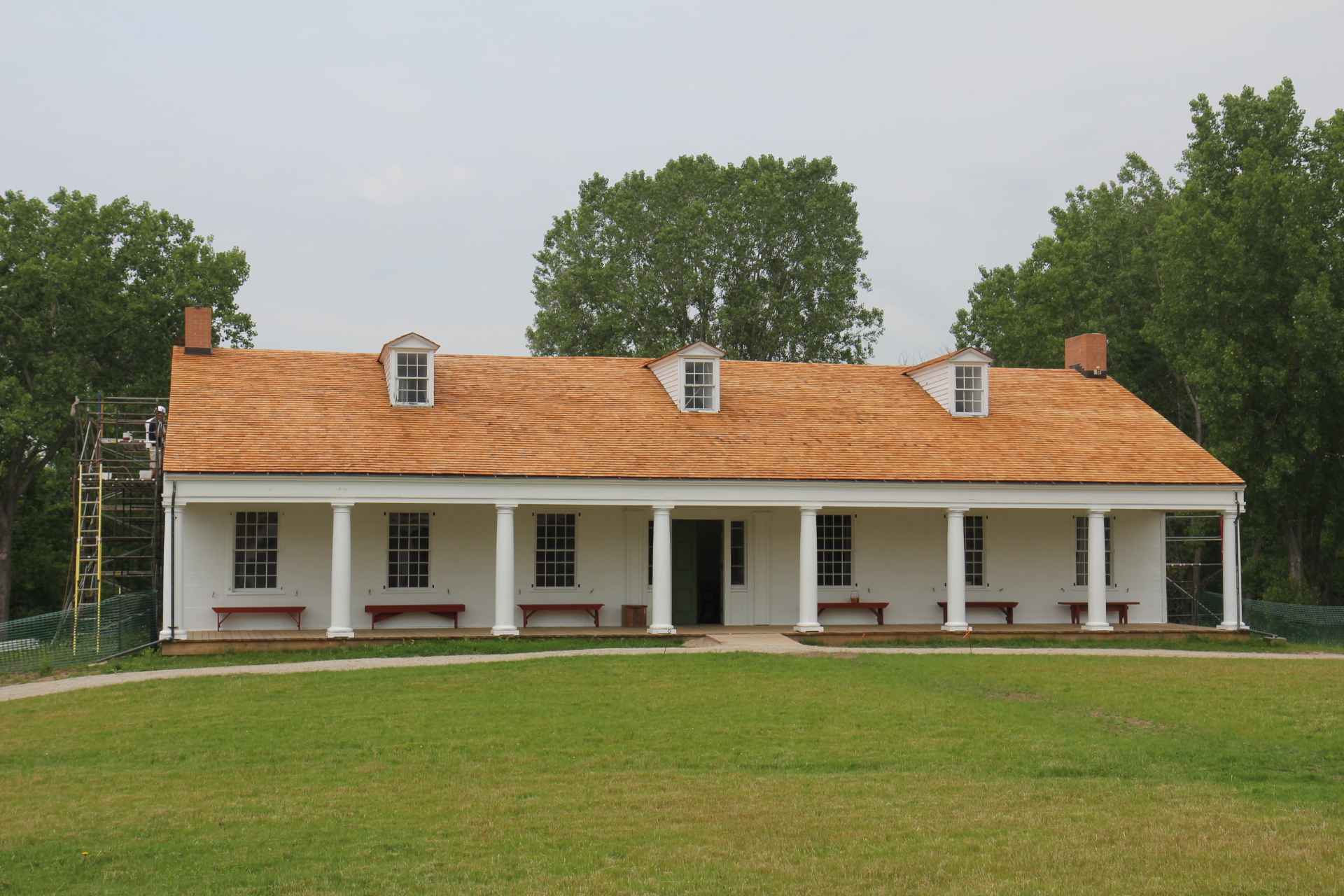
Hospital during 2014 restoration

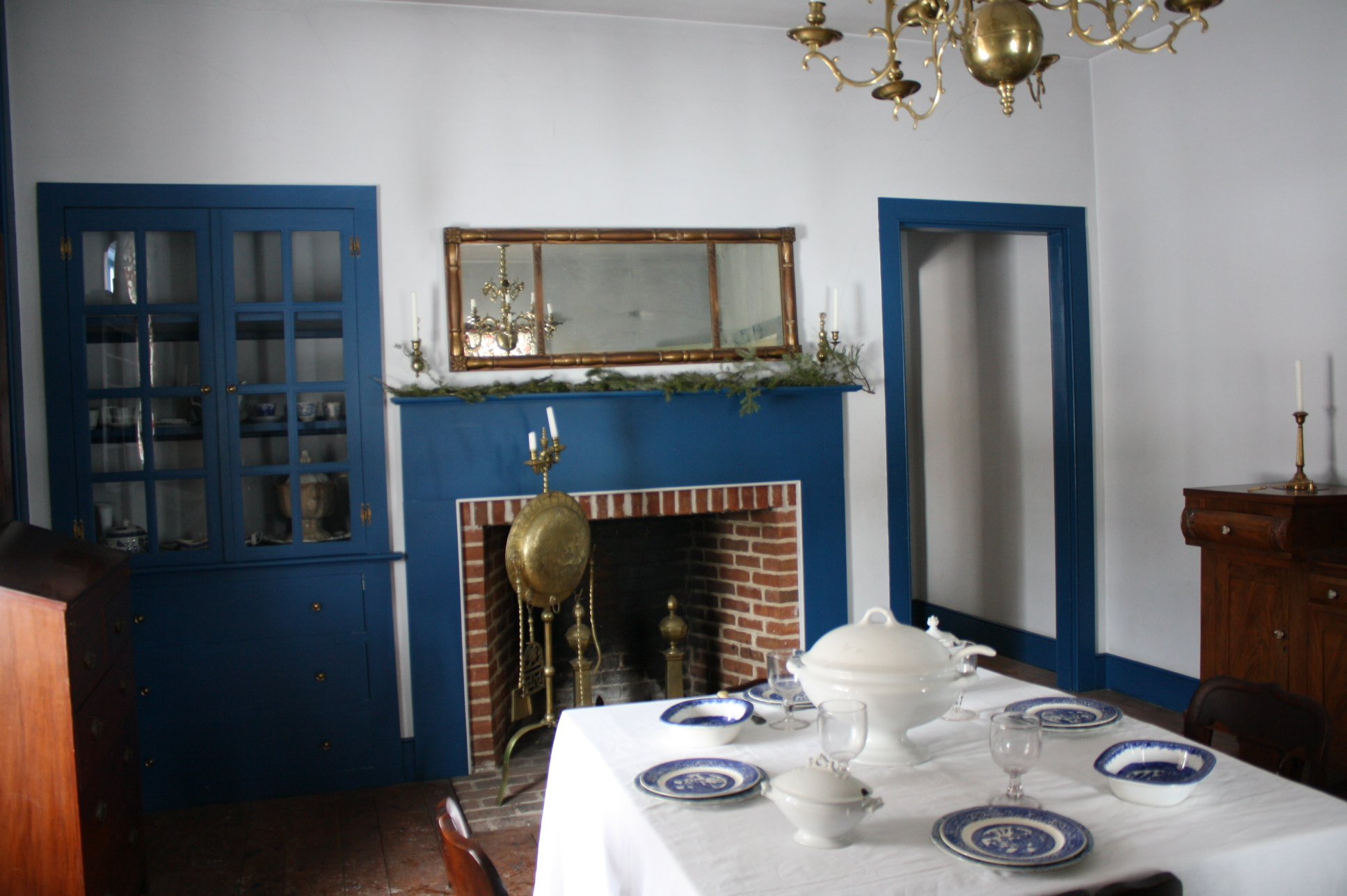
Dining area in Officers' Quarters

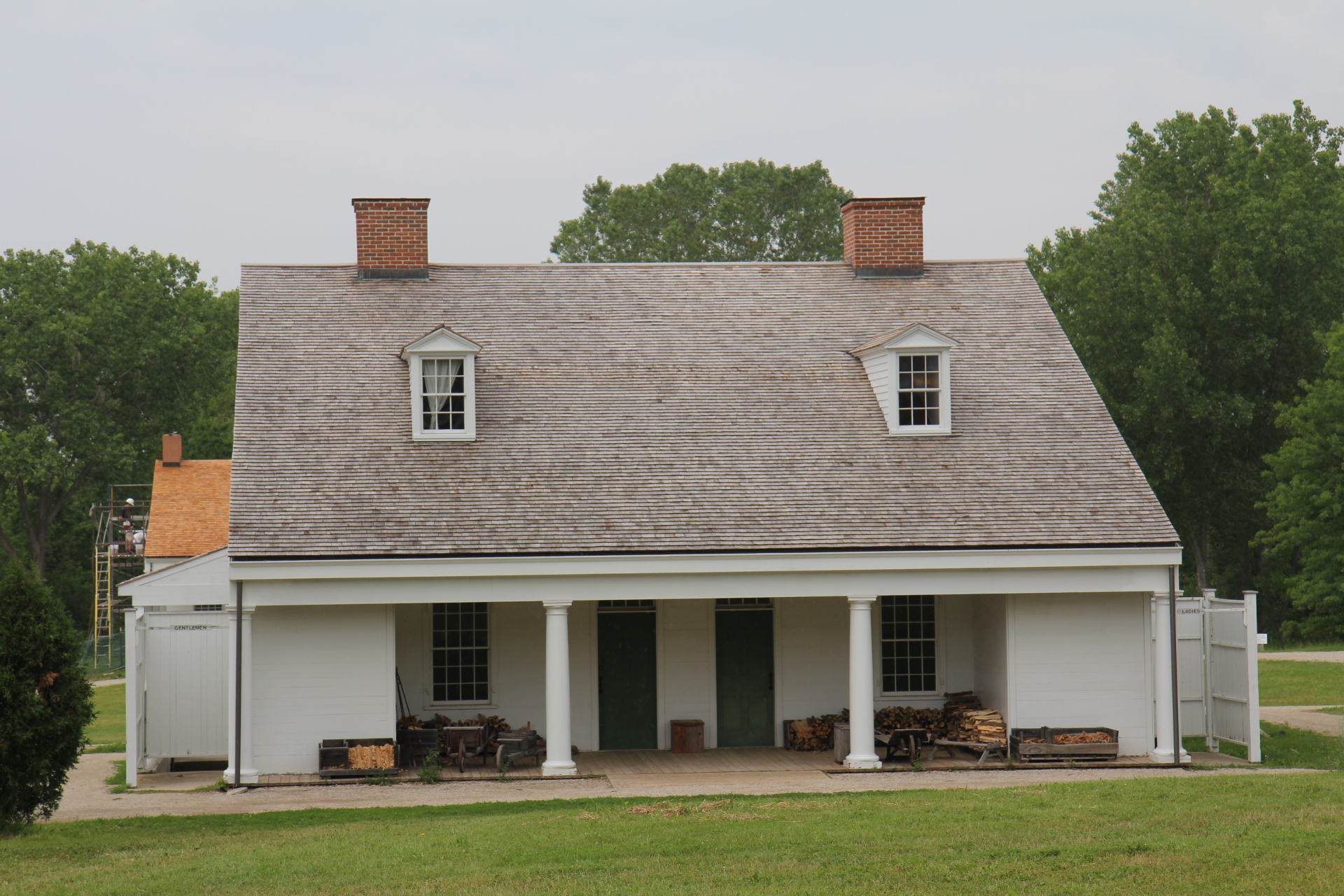
Side of Officers' Quarters

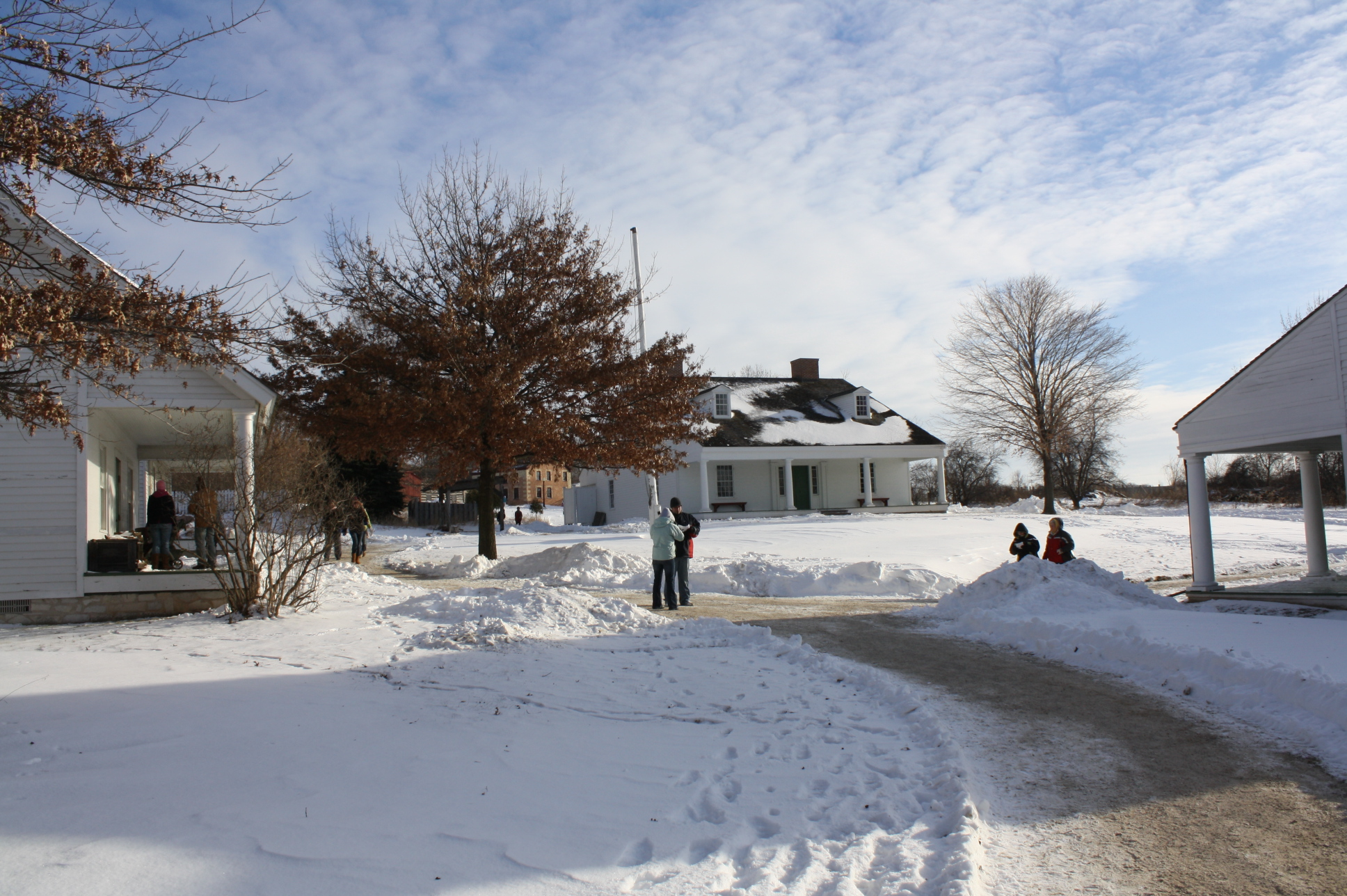
Looking southeast at courtyard

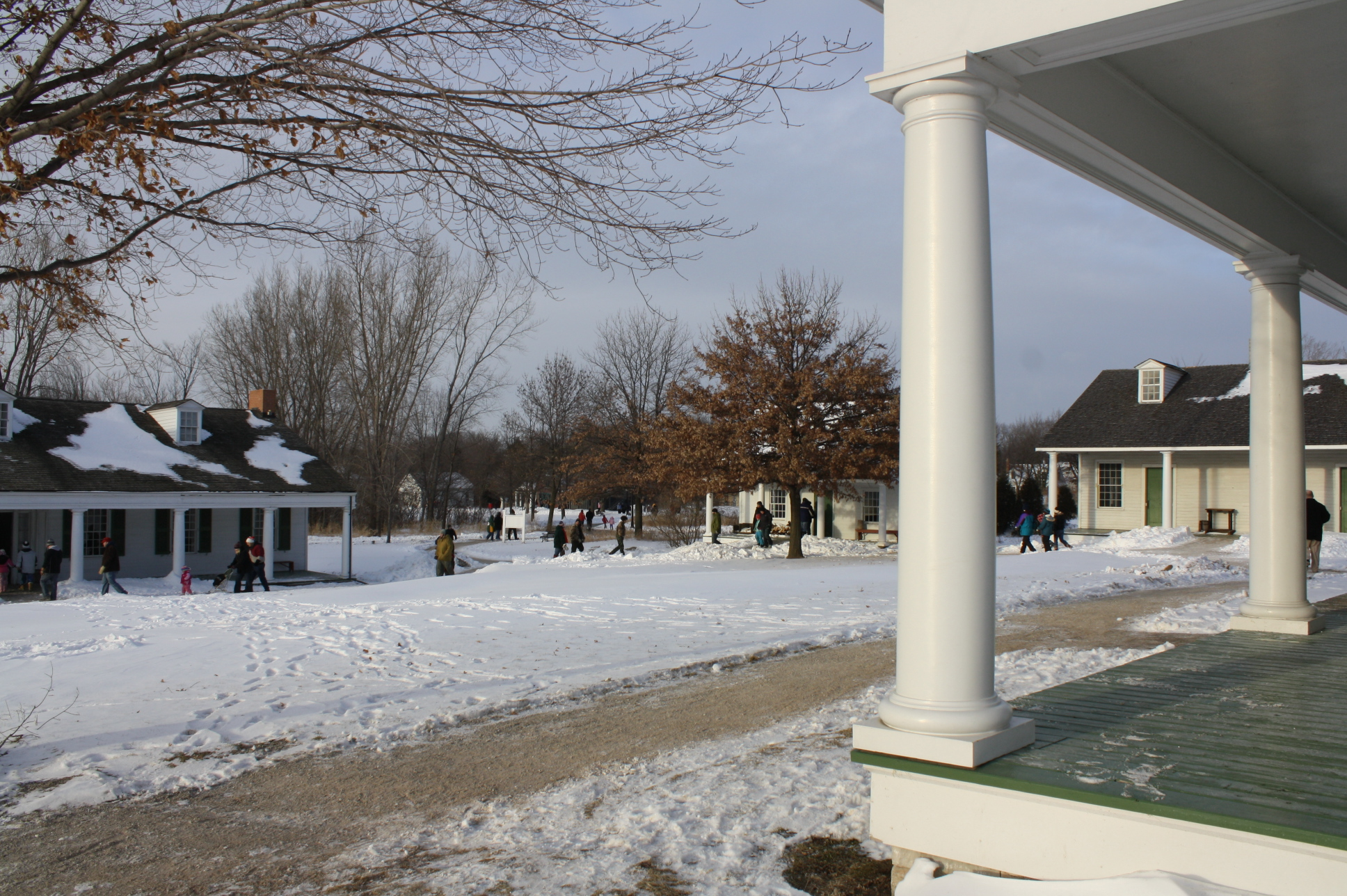
Looking northwest across courtyard

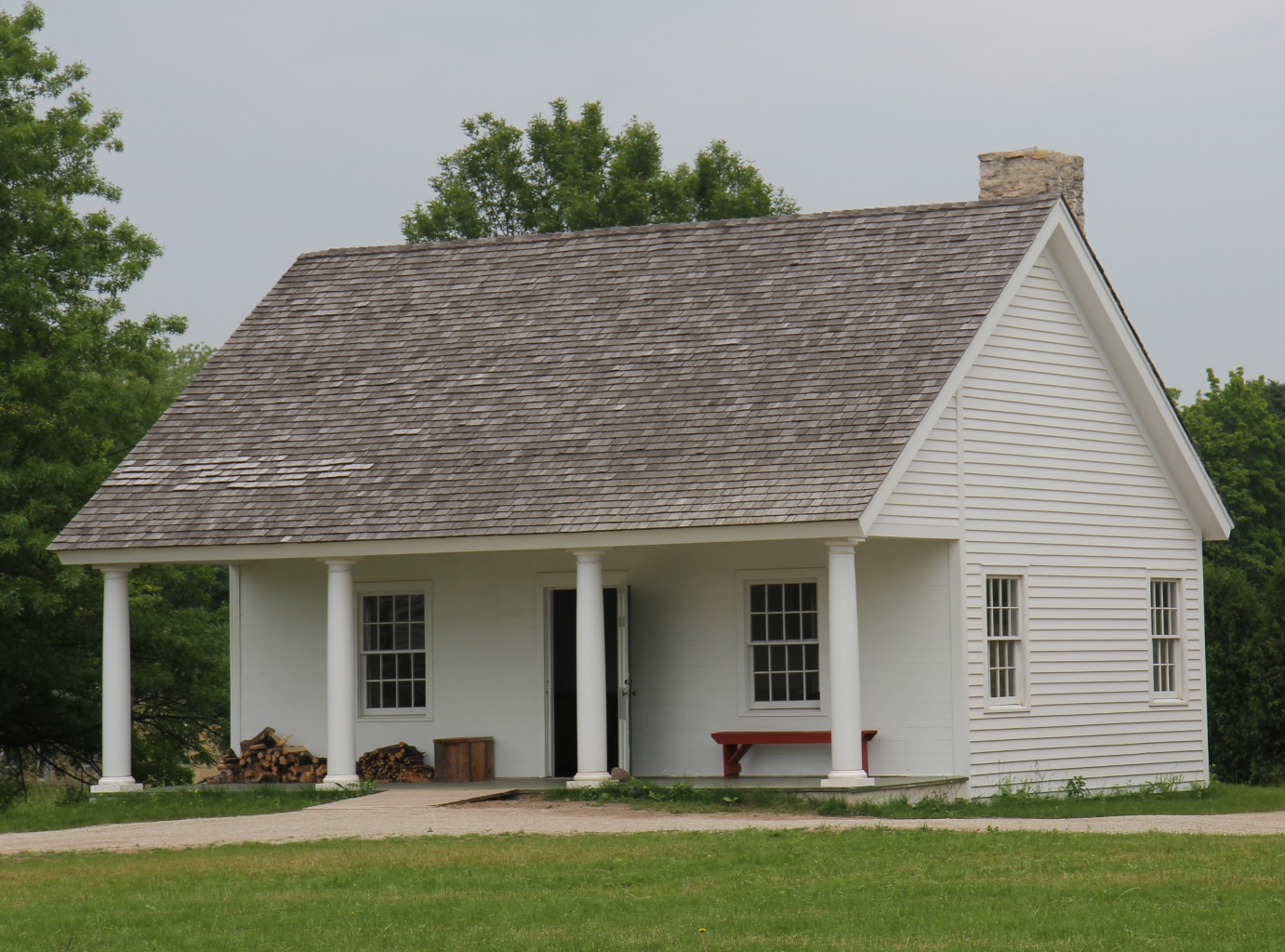
School

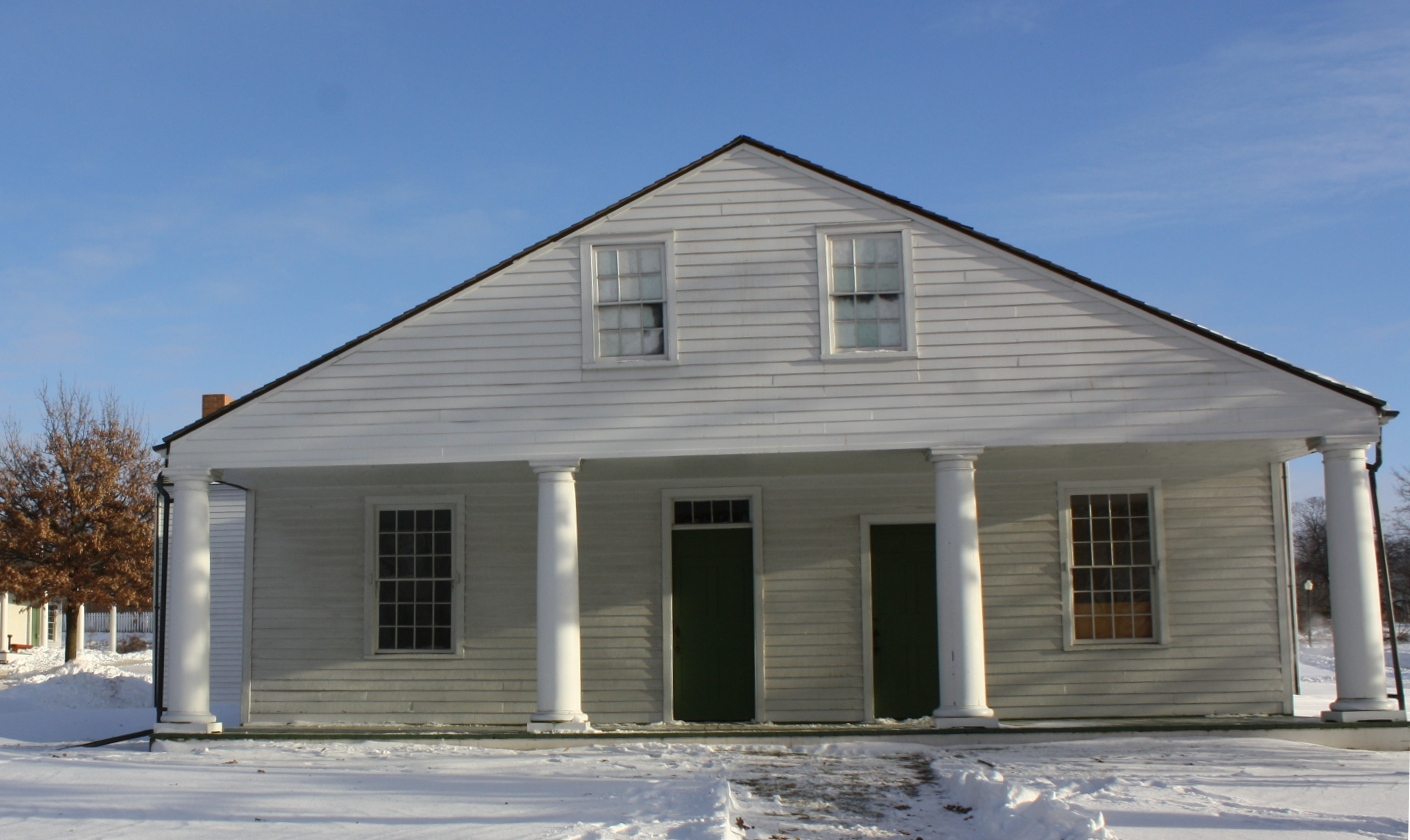
Ward

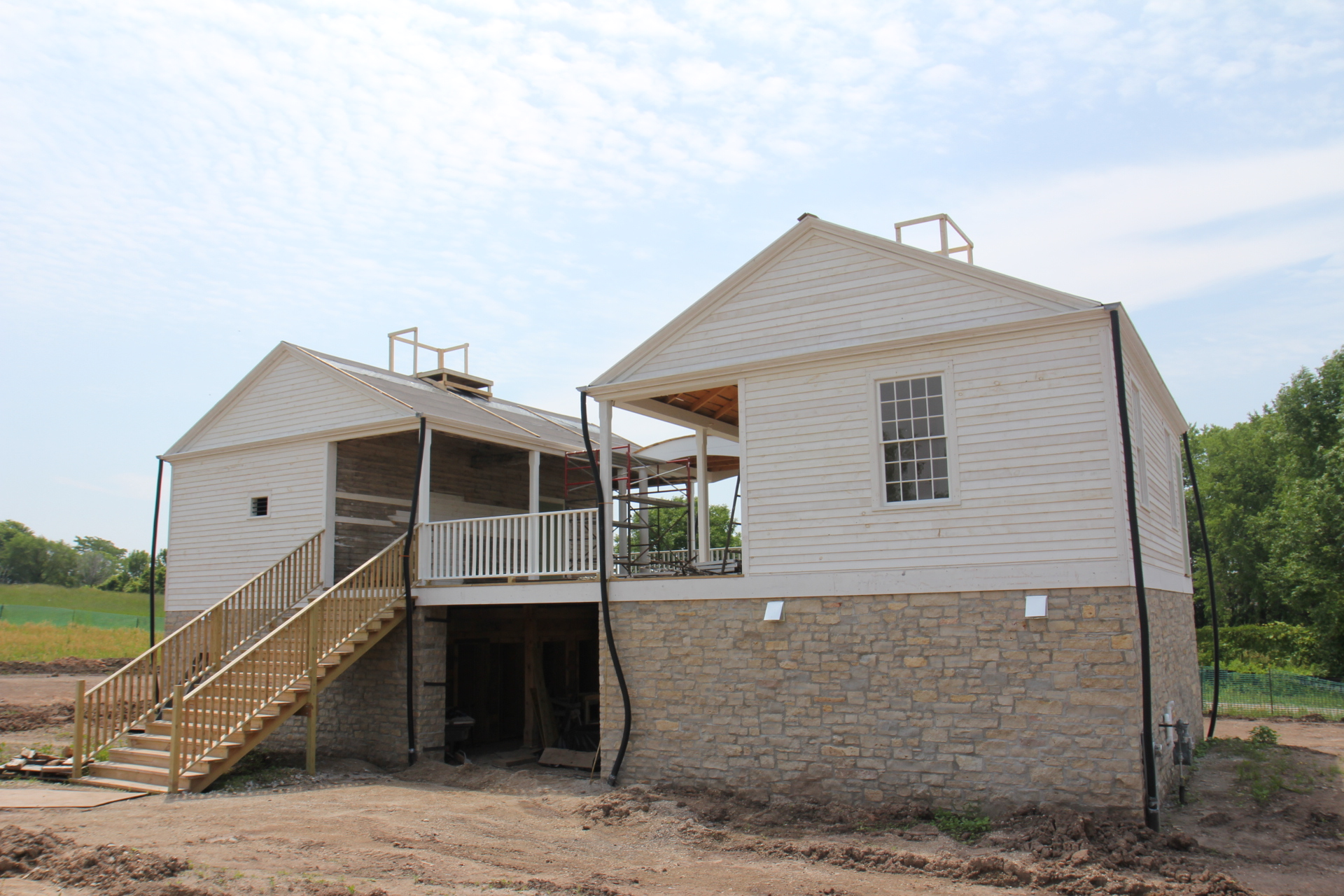
Guard house during 2014 reconstruction
