= Prairie du Chien (town), Wisconsin =

Prairie du Chien, Wisconsin
- Town
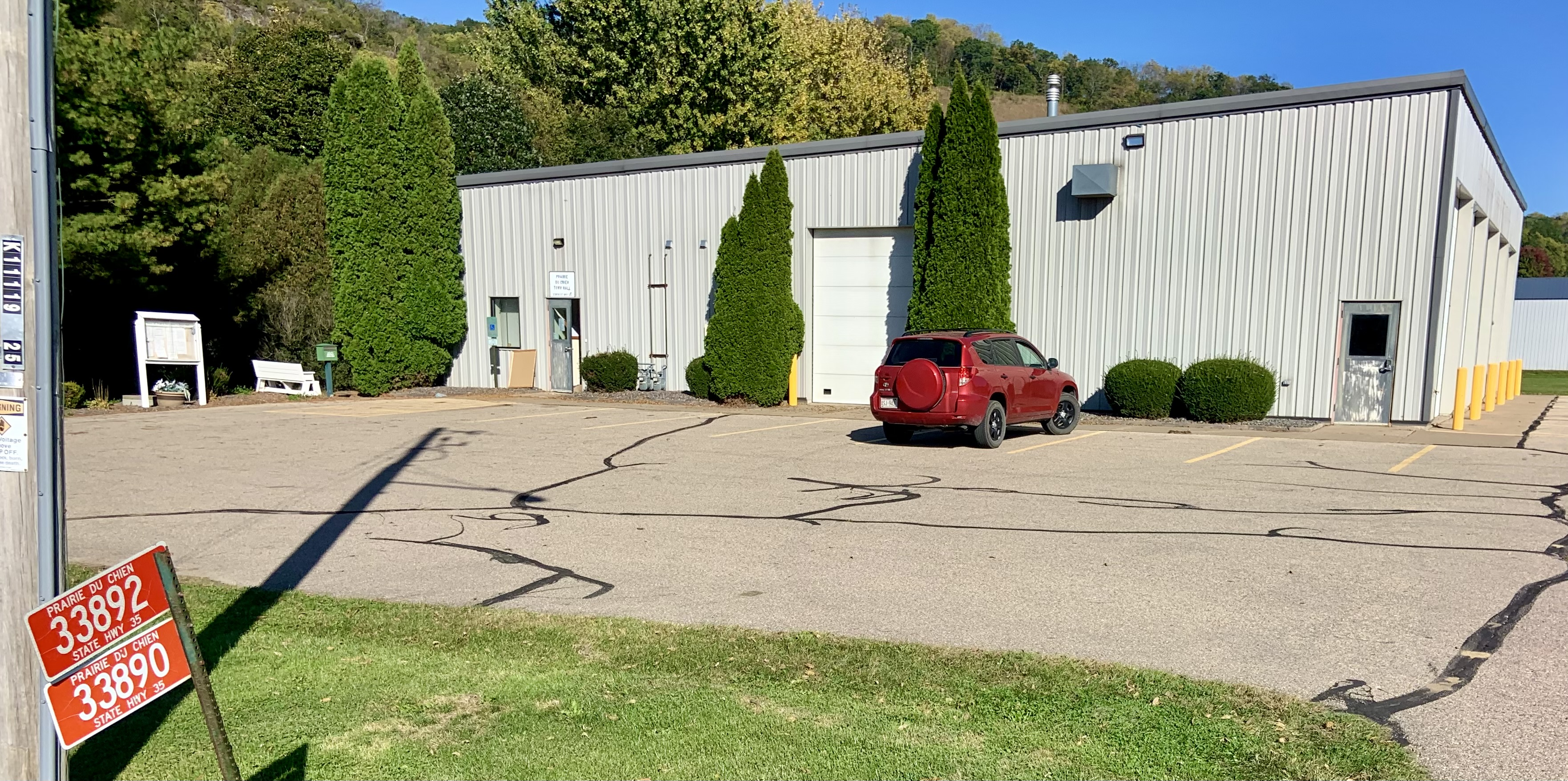
- Town hall

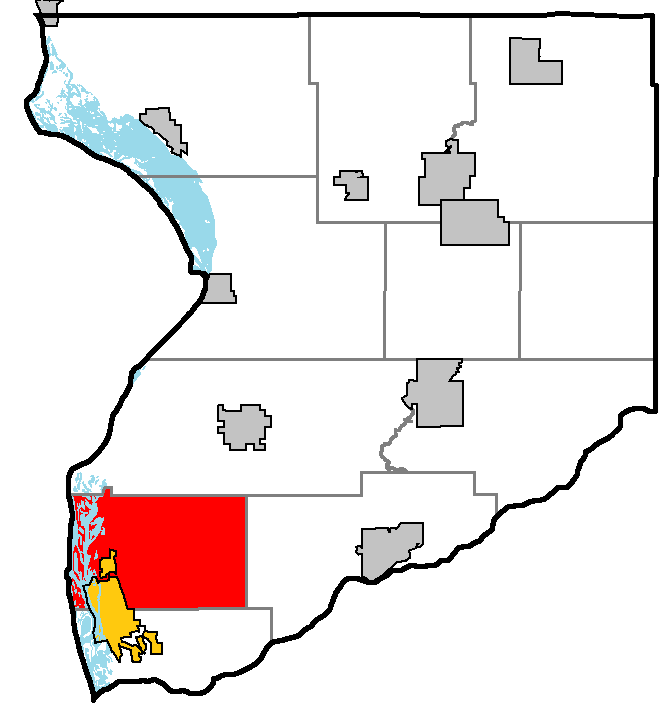
- Location of Prairie du Chien, within Crawford County, Wisconsin

- Location of Crawford County, Wisconsin
- Coordinates: 43°4′22″N 91°6′28″W
- Country: United States
- State: Wisconsin
- County: Crawford

Area
  - Total: 36.3 sq mi (94.1 km^{2})
  - Land: 33.6 sq mi (86.9 km^{2})
  - Water: 2.8 sq mi (7.2 km^{2})
- Elevation: 873 ft (266 m)

Population (2020)
  - Total: 957
  - Density: 28.5/sq mi (11.0/km^{2})
- Time zone: UTC-6 (Central (CST))
  - Summer (DST): UTC-5 (CDT)
- Area code: 608
- FIPS code: 55-65075
- GNIS feature ID: 1583972

Prairie du Chien is a town in Crawford County, Wisconsin, United States. The population was 957 at the 2020 census. The City of Prairie du Chien is located partially within the town. The unincorporated community of White Corners is also located in the town.

== Geography ==
According to the United States Census Bureau, the town has a total area of 36.3 square miles (94 km^{2}), of which 33.6 square miles (87 km^{2}) is land and 2.8 square miles (7.3 km^{2}) is water. The total area is 7.62% water.

== Demographics ==
At the 2020 census, there were 957 people, 382 households and 245 families residing in the town. The population density was 28.5 people per square mile (11.0 people/km^{2}). There were 781 housing units at an average density of 23.2 units per square mile (9.0 units/km^{2}). The racial make-up of the town was 97.01% White, 0.1% Black or African American, 0.0% Native American, 0.52% Asian, 0.00% Pacific Islander, 0.21% from other races and 4.18% from two or more races. 1.57% of the population were Hispanic or Latino of any race.

There were 382 households, of which 18.06% had children under the age of 18 living with them, 49.7% were married couples living together, 17% had a female householder with no spouse present, and 24.6% had a male householder with no spouse present. 35.9% of all households were made up of individuals and 22.8% had someone living alone who was 65 years of age or older. The average household size was 2.21 and the average family size was 2.88.

19.9% of the population were under the age of 18, 5.7% from 18 to 24, 13% from 25 to 44, 35.5% from 45 to 64, and 25.8% were 65 years of age or older. The median age was 51 years. For every 100 females, there were 94.1 males.

The median household income was $56,250 and the median family income was $81,771. The per capita income was $33,629. 13.7% of the population and 6.2% of families were below the poverty line. 24.1% of those under the age of 18 and 11.3% of those 65 and older were living below the poverty line.
