= Gratiot's Grove (Wisconsin) =

Coordinates: 42°32′16″N 90°14′30″W

Gratiot's Grove was a mining settlement and later, a frontier fort, during the Black Hawk War, in Michigan Territory (later Lafayette County, Wisconsin).

== History ==
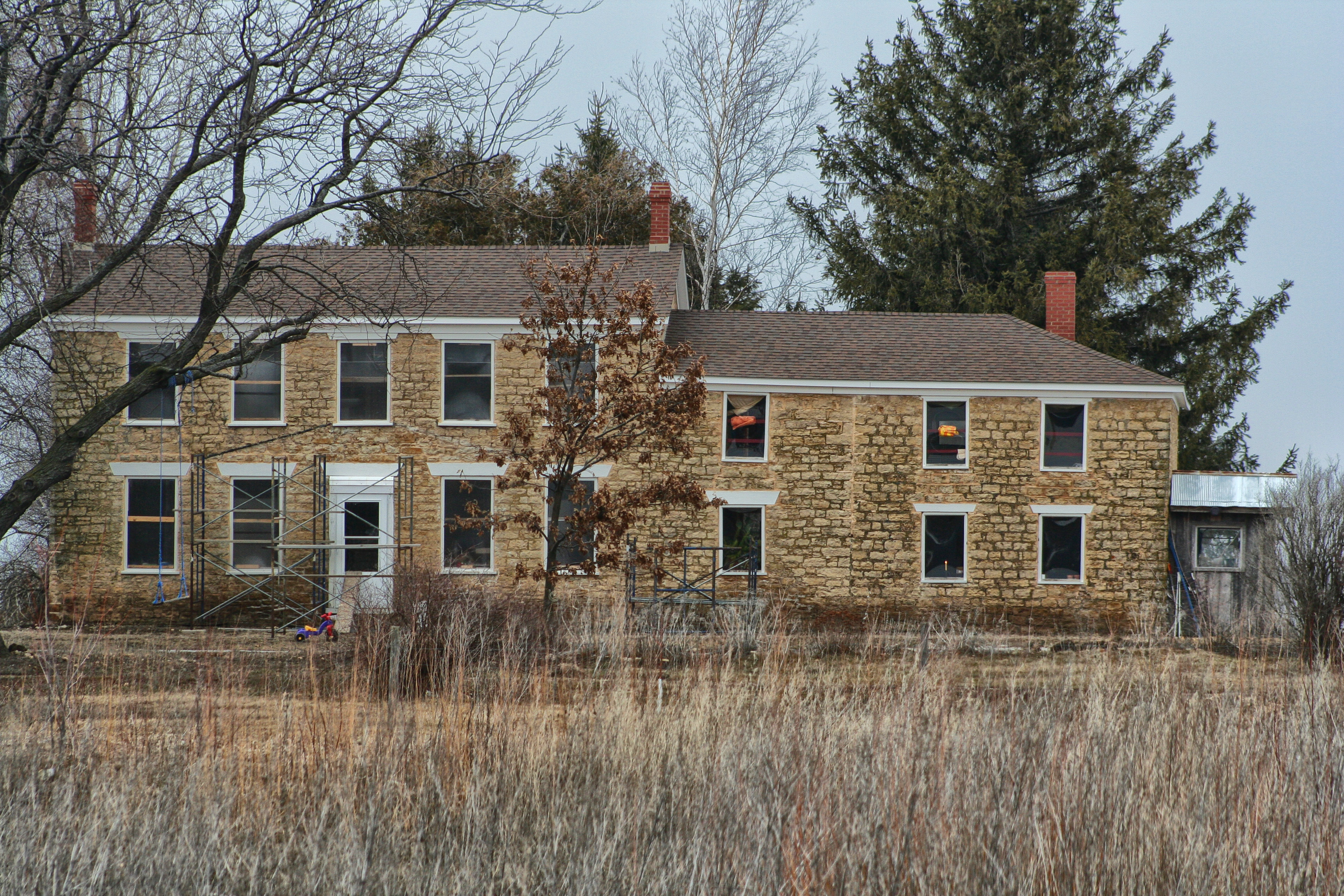
The Gratiot House south of Shullsburg on Rennick Rd.

In 1824, Henry Gratiot settled in the area with his brother and set up a mining and smelting operation. Later during the Black Hawk War, the settlement became Fort Gratiot. Today the Gratiot House and the Berry Tavern still survives in what had been Gratiot's Grove.
