= Michel Brisbois =

French-Canadian voyageur (1759–1837)

Michel Brisbois (October 1, 1759 – April 1, 1837) was a French-Canadian voyageur who was active in the upper Mississippi River valley as early as 1781. Originally a fur trader for the Hudson's Bay Company, he eventually settled in Prairie du Chien, in what became Wisconsin. He had two families, including three children with a Ho-Chunk woman of mixed-race ancestry.

After the War of 1812, Brisbois became a baker. Still a trader at heart, he noted the lack of stability in early government currency, and encouraged the use of bread (from his bakery) as a unit of exchange.

== History ==
Michel [aka Michael] Brisebois was born to a French-Canadian family in Yamaska, Quebec, Canada, in 1759. He attended school in Quebec.

Soon turning to the fur trade along the upper Mississippi River, he worked out of Mackinac (1778) for the British-owned Hudson's Bay Company. In 1781 he moved his operations to Prairie du Chien where, with other French-Canadian traders, he founded the first permanent European settlement. Although sympathizing with the British in the struggle for control of the Northwest Territory after the United States achieved independence, he accepted a commission in the Illinois Territorial Militia (1809).

During the War of 1812, Brisbois furnished supplies to both the American and British forces but maintained a pro-British attitude. Arrested for treason at the close of the war, he was sent to St. Louis, Missouri, for trial but was acquitted. After the war, Brisbois became a baker in Prairie du Chien. Still a trader at heart, he noted the lack of stability in early government currency, and encouraged the use of bread (from his bakery) as a unit of exchange.

In 1819 Brisbois was appointed associate justice for Crawford County by US Governor Lewis Cass of Michigan Territory. Later he was elected or appointed to other local offices in the Prairie du Chien area.

=== Marriage and family ===
In 1785 Brisbois had married a Winnebago (Ho-Chunk) woman, in what may have been an informal or "country marriage" typical in that period between traders and Native American women. (She was reputedly the natural, or illegitimate Métis daughter of Charles Gautier de Verville and a native woman). Dousman had three mixed-race children with her. In Canada the Métis have been recognized as an ethnic group that has the status of a First Nation. The children were named Angélique, Michel, and Antoine, and were raised primarily by their mother, who lived in a settlement with Ho-Chunk relatives. The Ho-Chunk have a matrilineal kinship system, in which they consider children born to the mother's people. By other accounts, according to affidavits of people who knew the persons involved, Brisbois had fathered at least one daughter named Angelica Brisbois with a "full blood Winnebago woman," named Cham-brey-win-kaw. After Angelica's death, her widower cited her Ho-Chunk ancestry as the basis for claiming money for their two children, set aside for people of mixed ancestry in the 1837 Winnebago treaty.

Later Brisbois married formally on August 8, 1796, in Mackinaw City, Michigan, to Domitilde (Madeleine) Gautier de Verville, a legitimate daughter of Charles Gautier de Verville. They had a son Bernard Walter Brisbois, born in Prairie du Chien in 1808. The senior Brisbois died in Prairie du Chien on April 1, 1837.

== Brisbois House (I) ==
For Brisbois House (II), see Bernard Brisbois House

Built in 1815, the Michel Brisbois House served as a trading post and warehouse of the American Fur Company. In the 1850s the house was demolished.

By 1923, the Bernard Brisbois House was mistakenly believed to be the Michel Brisbois House, and was thus considered to be one of the oldest European-American buildings in the State of Wisconsin. But research by the Wisconsin Historical Society determined that this structure was a home built by Joseph Rolette as part of a separation contract negotiated in 1836 for his estranged wife Jane Fisher Rolette. She was said to be a relative of Michel Brisbois. She married again in 1844 after Rolette's death, to Hercules L. Dousman, at one time her late husband's partner. At that time, she transferred title of the house to her cousin Bernard Walter Brisbois.

== Sources ==
- Wisconsin State Historical Society
