= Henry Gratiot =

Wisconsin pioneer and U.S. Indian Agent

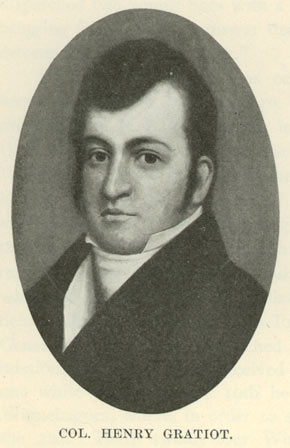
- Born: April 25, 1789; St. Louis, Spanish Upper Louisiana Territory, present-day State of Missouri
- Died: April 27, 1836 (aged 47); Baltimore, Maryland
- Other name: Colonel Henry Gratiot
- Occupations: farmer, mill owner, mine owner, smelter, trader, Indian agent
- Employer(s): self employed, U.S. Government
- Known for: U.S. Indian Agent to the Winnebago during the Winnebago War and Black Hawk War
- Spouse: Susan Hempstead (m. 1813–1836)
- Children: 4
- Parent(s): Charles Gratiot, Sr. and Victoire Chouteau
- Relatives: 12 siblings; including Charles Gratiot, Jr.

Colonel Henry Gratiot (April 25, 1789 – April 27, 1836) was a French-American pioneer, farmer, and mill owner. During the Winnebago and Black Hawk Wars, he acted as both an intermediary and early U.S. Indian agent to the Winnebagos throughout the early 19th century. He and his brother Jean Pierre were among the first pioneers to settle in Wisconsin, operating a successful lead mining and lead smelting business, during the 1820s and 1830s. Both, the present-day village of Gratiot, Wisconsin and the town of Gratiot, Wisconsin are named in his honor.

== Early life ==
The second eldest son of Illinois pioneer Charles Gratiot, Sr. and Victoire Chouteau, Henry Gratiot was born in St. Louis, Spanish Upper Louisiana Territory, in the present-day State of Missouri. He became engaged to Susan Hempstead, only two years after her family arrived from Connecticut, and the two eventually married on June 21, 1813. The youngest daughter of Revolutionary War soldier Stephen Hempstead, her brothers included Edward Hempstead, the first congressional delegate for the Missouri Territory, as well as prominent lawyer Charles S. Hempstead and businessman William Hempstead. He and his wife would live at a small farm and mill, west of St. Louis, for the next several years.

In October 1825, following the admission of Missouri as a slave state, the 36-year-old Gratiot moved his family to the Fever River lead mines region (present-day Galena, Illinois) due to his opposition to slavery and his wish to raise his family in a free state. With the discovery of lead ore in the region in 1826, he and his younger brother Jean Pierre Bugnion Gratiot became interested in the mineral lands of present-day Shullsburg, Wisconsin. Purchasing the right to mine the area from the local Winnebagos, he and his brother were the first to develop a successful mining and smelting operation at Gratiot's Grove in what is now Lafayette County, Wisconsin. Employing sixty Frenchmen and using six furnaces, the brothers would undertake nearly all smelting for the entire region for several years.

== Indian agent ==
During this time, he and his wife became friendly with the local Winnebagos visiting them during the winter of 1826-27. They eventually befriended a mixed-blood woman, Catharine Mayotte, who had doctored Susan Gratiot for a time and with whom they exchanged gifts and information. Developing a close friendship, the three would remain in contact between 1827 and 1835. The Winnebago Prophet as well spoke highly of Henry Gratiot who "..came as a 'Chouteau' ... welcome[d] him to his village; but if he came as a white man he must consider him, like all white men, an enemy."

Although warned by the Winnebagos before their uprising against the United States the following summer, Gratiot allowed American forces in 1827 to build a stockade at Gratiot's Grove later renamed Fort Gratiot by the Americans. The women and children in the surrounding area were escorted from the fort to Galena and then to St. Louis.

After their defeat, the Winnebago left the area in droves although a few remained for a while longer to trade with arriving American settlers. Appointed a subagent for the Winnebago in 1830, he traveled father into the Wisconsin wilderness to negotiate annuity payments on behalf of the U.S. government. He would also be present at the signing of several treaties between the Winnebago and the United States and was later appointed an official Indian subagent to the Winnebago for the region south of Prairie du Chien in March 1831.

== Black Hawk War ==
During the Black Hawk War, he exerted his influence with the Winnebago acting as an intermediary in his efforts to negotiate peace and maintain stability in the region. Journeying to Prophet's Town in early-1832, he stayed with Black Hawk from April 25–27; however, Black Hawk refused to hear the message he had been given from General Henry Atkinson.

Gratiot did, however, side with the U.S. authorities, in securing the release of American hostages and prisoners, as seen when working with Chief Wabaunsee and members the Winnebago, to negotiate the release of Indian Creek Massacre survivors, Rachel and Sylvia Hall. On May 25, 1832, he and Colonel Henry Dodge held council with the Winnebagos, as to their position in the war to, which the Winnebago gave their assurance of fidelity in the conflict, "though little reliance was placed on their sincerity." During this meeting, he sent Winnebago chieftain White Crow to Black Hawk's camp purchasing their freedom in exchange for horses and various trinkets valued at $2,000. The young women were later, delivered to Gratiot at Blue Mounds Fort on June 3.

He was later, called on by General Edmund P. Gaines to investigate the rumors that the Winnebagos under the Winnebago Prophet, along with the Kickapoos and the Potawatomis, were attempting to join up with Black Hawk's British Band after being invited to join their ranks. Finding the Winnebago Prophet and several of his followers at Saukenuk, he persuaded them to return to their village. The Prophet did not remain at his lodge for long and resumed recruiting for Black Hawk in Winnebago villages upriver, however he was ultimately unsuccessful in this venture. The activities of the Rock River Winnebagos during the war, including several speeches by several prominent Winnebagos, were recorded by Gratiot in his personal diary.

== Later years ==
Despite his efforts, relations between the United States and the Winnebago rapidly deteriorated following the end of the Black Hawk War. As American settlement of the territory continued, the native and mixed-blood population near Gratiot's Grove as well as in the areas of Galena and Dubuque had become deserted by 1833 with exception to "a few straggling Winnebagos who lingered in the country."

He resigned his position as an Indian agent the following year and, closing his mining business, he bought a section of land in which he built a small house outside of Gratiot's Grove to retire as a gentleman farmer. He and his wife still continued their friendship with the Winnebago who made visits to their home every autumn camping under the pine trees near their new home.

During the fall of 1835, four chieftains representing the remaining bands from Rock River to Gratiot's Grove met with Gratiot to discuss the payments of annuities which had ceased "by some bad management". It was reported to Gratiot that the "Indains [sic] on Rock River ... are allmost [sic] starved and naked." Gratiot then proceeded to travel to St. Louis to acquire the necessary signatures and documentation for the Rock River Winnebagos to receive payments from General Henry Atkinson before preparing to leave for Washington, D.C. in early 1836 to clear up the matter.

== Death ==
However, by the time he was ready to leave for the capital, few Winnebagos lived near his residence and within a year, the federal government began favoring their removal. While visiting the capital, he contracted a severe cold which grew worse when he attempted to travel back to Wisconsin. By the time he reached Baltimore, Maryland, he had become too ill to continue and forced to stop in Barnum's Hotel. However, his condition grew worse and died at the hotel on April 27, 1836. At the time of his death, he had been attended by his brother General Charles Gratiot, General George Wallace Jones, Captain Henry A. Thompson and Chief Justice Roger B. Taney among others.

== Children ==
Of his four children, two of his sons Charles and Edward Gratiot both had distinguished careers in the US Army, the latter, serving as a volunteer US Army paymaster. His only surviving daughter, Adele, became the wife of Congressman Elihu Benjamin Washburne, who later published his biography Henry Gratiot, a Pioneer of Wisconsin (1884) based on speeches Washburne had delivered to the State Historical Society of Wisconsin during the early 1880s. Among his historical publications, this was considered his finest work.
