= Minnesota's 5th Senate district =

American legislative district

Minnesota's 5th State Senate district
Senator
| Paul Utke; R–Park Rapids |
since 2023
- Population (2020): 85,214

The Minnesota Senate, District 5, centers on the cities of Grand Rapids and Walker. It is currently represented by Republican Paul Utke.

== List of senators ==
| Session | Image | Senator | Party | Term start | Term end | Home | Location |
|---|---|---|---|---|---|---|---|
| 1st | | George E. Skinner | Non | December 2, 1857 | December 6, 1859 | Faribault | Rice |
| 1st | | Michael Cook | Rep | December 2, 1857 | January 2, 1861 | Faribault | Rice |
| 2nd | | Michael Cook | Rep | December 2, 1857 | January 2, 1861 | Faribault | Rice |
| 2nd | | Daniel H. Frost | Non | December 7, 1859 | January 2, 1861 | Northfield | Rice |
| 3rd | | Rufus J. Baldwin | Rep | January 8, 1861 | January 4, 1864 | Minneapolis | Hennepin |
| 4th | | Rufus J. Baldwin | Rep | January 8, 1861 | January 4, 1864 | Minneapolis | Hennepin |
| 5th | | Rufus J. Baldwin | Rep | January 8, 1861 | January 4, 1864 | Minneapolis | Hennepin |
| 6th | | Dorilus Morrison | Rep | January 5, 1864 | January 1, 1866 | Minneapolis | Hennepin |
| 7th | | Dorilus Morrison | Rep | January 5, 1864 | January 1, 1866 | Minneapolis | Hennepin |
| 8th | | Curtis Hussey Pettit | Rep | January 2, 1866 | January 7, 1867 | Minneapolis | Hennepin |
| 9th | | J.C. Whitney | Rep | January 8, 1867 | January 6, 1868 | Minneapolis | Hennepin |
| 10th | | Curtis Hussey Pettit | Rep | January 7, 1868 | January 1, 1872 | Minneapolis | Hennepin |
| 11th | | Curtis Hussey Pettit | Rep | January 7, 1868 | January 1, 1872 | Minneapolis | Hennepin |
| 12th | | Curtis Hussey Pettit | Rep | January 7, 1868 | January 1, 1872 | Minneapolis | Hennepin |
| 13th | | Curtis Hussey Pettit | Rep | January 7, 1868 | January 1, 1872 | Minneapolis | Hennepin |
| 14th | | Horatio D. Brown | Non | January 2, 1872 | January 6, 1873 | Albert Lea | Freeborn |
| 15th | | T.G. Johnsrud | Rep | January 5, 1873 | January 4, 1875 | Albert Lea | Freeborn |
| 16th | | T.G. Johnsrud | Rep | January 5, 1873 | January 4, 1875 | Albert Lea | Freeborn |
| 17th | | Thomas Henry Armstrong | Ind | January 5, 1875 | January 6, 1879 | Albert Lea | Freeborn |
| 18th | | Thomas Henry Armstrong | Ind | January 5, 1875 | January 6, 1879 | Albert Lea | Freeborn |
| 19th | | Thomas Henry Armstrong | Rep | January 5, 1875 | January 6, 1879 | Albert Lea | Freeborn |
| 20th | | Thomas Henry Armstrong | Rep | January 5, 1875 | January 6, 1879 | Albert Lea | Freeborn |
| 21st | | Albert Clark Wedge | Rep | January 7, 1879 | January 1, 1883 | Albert Lea | Freeborn Steele Waseca |
| 22nd | | Albert Clark Wedge | Rep | January 7, 1879 | January 1, 1883 | Albert Lea | Freeborn Steele Waseca |
| 23rd | | Daniel F. Goodrich | Rep | January 2, 1883 | September 1, 1889 | Blue Earth | Faribault |
| 24th | | Daniel F. Goodrich | Rep | January 2, 1883 | September 1, 1889 | Blue Earth | Faribault |
| 25th | | Daniel F. Goodrich | Rep | January 2, 1883 | September 1, 1889 | Blue Earth | Faribault |
| 26th | | Daniel F. Goodrich | Rep | January 2, 1883 | September 1, 1889 | Blue Earth | Faribault |
| 26th | | Vacant | | September 1, 1889 | January 6, 1891 | | Faribault |
| 27th | | Jacob A. Kiester | Rep | January 6, 1891 | January 7, 1895 | Blue Earth | Faribault |
| 28th | | Jacob A. Kiester | Rep | January 6, 1891 | January 7, 1895 | Blue Earth | Faribault |
| 29th | | George D. McArthur | Rep | January 8, 1895 | January 2, 1899 | Blue Earth | Faribault |
| 30th | | George D. McArthur | Rep | January 8, 1895 | January 2, 1899 | Blue Earth | Faribault |
| 31st | | Richard Enos Thompson | Rep | January 3, 1899 | January 7, 1907 | Preston | Fillmore |
| 32nd | | Richard Enos Thompson | Rep | January 3, 1899 | January 7, 1907 | Preston | Fillmore |
| 33rd | | Richard Enos Thompson | Rep | January 3, 1899 | January 7, 1907 | Preston | Fillmore |
| 34th | | Richard Enos Thompson | Rep | January 3, 1899 | January 7, 1907 | Preston | Fillmore |
| 35th | | Samuel A. Nelson | Rep | January 8, 1907 | January 4, 1915 | Lanesboro | Fillmore |
| 36th | | Samuel A. Nelson | Rep | January 8, 1907 | January 4, 1915 | Lanesboro | Fillmore |
| 37th | | Samuel A. Nelson | Rep | January 8, 1907 | January 4, 1915 | Lanesboro | Fillmore |
| 38th | | Samuel A. Nelson | Rep | January 8, 1907 | January 4, 1915 | Lanesboro | Fillmore |
| 39th | | Alexander S. Campbell | Rep | January 5, 1915 | January 6, 1919 | Austin | Dodge Mower |
| 40th | | Alexander S. Campbell | Rep | January 5, 1915 | January 6, 1919 | Austin | Dodge Mower |
| 41st | | William Asa Nolan | Rep | January 7, 1919 | June 28, 1922 | Grand Meadow | Dodge Mower |
| 42nd | | William Asa Nolan | Rep | January 7, 1919 | June 28, 1922 | Grand Meadow | Dodge Mower |
| 42nd | | Vacant | Rep | June 28, 1922 | January 2, 1923 | | Dodge Mower |
| 43rd | | Fremont Jackson Thoe | Rep | January 2, 1923 | January 3, 1927 | Hayfield | Dodge Mower |
| 44th | | Fremont Jackson Thoe | Rep | January 2, 1923 | January 3, 1927 | Hayfield | Dodge Mower |
| 45th | | Victor Christgau | Rep | January 4, 1927 | March 4, 1929 | Austin | Dodge Mower |
| 46th | | Victor Christgau | Rep | January 4, 1927 | March 4, 1929 | Austin | Dodge Mower |
| | Vacant | | March 4, 1929 | January 6, 1931 | | | Dodge Mower |
| 47th | | A.O. Starks | Non | January 6, 1931 | January 6, 1947 | Dexter | Dodge Mower |
| 48th | | A.O. Starks | Non | January 6, 1931 | January 6, 1947 | Dexter | Dodge Mower |
| 49th | | A.O. Starks | Non | January 6, 1931 | January 6, 1947 | Dexter | Dodge Mower |
| 50th | | A.O. Starks | Non | January 6, 1931 | January 6, 1947 | Dexter | Dodge Mower |
| 51st | | A.O. Starks | Non | January 6, 1931 | January 6, 1947 | Dexter | Dodge Mower |
| 52nd | | A.O. Starks | Non | January 6, 1931 | January 6, 1947 | Dexter | Dodge Mower |
| 53rd | | A.O. Starks | Non | January 6, 1931 | January 6, 1947 | Dexter | Dodge Mower |
| 54th | | A.O. Starks | Non | January 6, 1931 | January 6, 1947 | Dexter | Dodge Mower |
| 55th | | Werner E. Wuertz | Non | January 7, 1947 | January 1, 1951 | Austin | Dodge Mower |
| 56th | | Werner E. Wuertz | Non | January 7, 1947 | January 1, 1951 | Austin | Dodge Mower |
| 57th | | Philip Sheridan Duff | Lib | January 2, 1951 | January 3, 1955 | Kassan | Dodge Mower |
| 58th | | Philip Sheridan Duff | Lib | January 2, 1951 | January 3, 1955 | Kassan | Dodge Mower |
| 59th | | P.J. Holand | Con | January 4, 1955 | January 2, 1967 | Austin | Dodge Mower |
| 60th | | P.J. Holand | Con | January 4, 1955 | January 2, 1967 | Austin | Dodge Mower |
| 61st | | P.J. Holand | Con | January 4, 1955 | January 2, 1967 | Austin | Dodge Mower |
| 62nd | | P.J. Holand | Con | January 4, 1955 | January 2, 1967 | Austin | Dodge Mower |
| 63rd | | P.J. Holand | Con | January 4, 1955 | January 2, 1967 | Austin | Dodge Mower |
| 64th | | P.J. Holand | Con | January 4, 1955 | January 2, 1967 | Austin | Dodge Mower |
| 65th | | Charles Robert Hansen | Lib | January 3, 1967 | January 1, 1973 | Austin | Mower |
| 66th | | Charles Robert Hansen | Lib | January 3, 1967 | January 1, 1973 | Austin | Mower |
| 67th | | Charles Robert Hansen | Lib | January 3, 1967 | January 1, 1973 | Austin | Mower |
| 68th | | George F. Perpich | DFL | January 2, 1973 | January 5, 1981 | Chisholm | St. Louis |
| 69th | | George F. Perpich | DFL | January 2, 1973 | January 5, 1981 | Chisholm | St. Louis |
| 70th | | George F. Perpich | DFL | January 2, 1973 | January 5, 1981 | Chisholm | St. Louis |
| 71st | | George F. Perpich | DFL | January 2, 1973 | January 5, 1981 | Chisholm | St. Louis |
| 72nd | | Ron Dicklich | DFL | January 6, 1981 | January 4, 1993 | Hibbing | St. Louis |
| 73rd | | Ron Dicklich | DFL | January 6, 1981 | January 4, 1993 | Hibbing | St. Louis |
| 74th | | Ron Dicklich | DFL | January 6, 1981 | January 4, 1993 | Hibbing | St. Louis |
| 75th | | Ron Dicklich | DFL | January 6, 1981 | January 4, 1993 | Hibbing | St. Louis |
| 76th | | Ron Dicklich | DFL | January 6, 1981 | January 4, 1993 | Hibbing | St. Louis |
| 77th | | Ron Dicklich | DFL | January 6, 1981 | January 4, 1993 | Hibbing | St. Louis |
| 78th | | Jerry Janezich | DFL | January 5, 1993 | January 2, 2001 | Chisholm | St. Louis |
| 79th | | Jerry Janezich | DFL | January 5, 1993 | January 2, 2001 | Chisholm | St. Louis |
| 80th | | Jerry Janezich | DFL | January 5, 1993 | January 2, 2001 | Chisholm | St. Louis |
| 81st | | Jerry Janezich | DFL | January 5, 1993 | January 2, 2001 | Chisholm | St. Louis |
| 82nd | | Dave Tomassoni | DFL | January 3, 2001 | January 7, 2013 | Chisholm | St. Louis |
| 83rd | | Dave Tomassoni | DFL | January 3, 2001 | January 7, 2013 | Chisholm | St. Louis |
| 84th | | Dave Tomassoni | DFL | January 3, 2001 | January 7, 2013 | Chisholm | St. Louis |
| 85th | | Dave Tomassoni | DFL | January 3, 2001 | January 7, 2013 | Chisholm | St. Louis |
| 86th | | Dave Tomassoni | DFL | January 3, 2001 | January 7, 2013 | Chisholm | St. Louis |
| 87th | | Dave Tomassoni | DFL | January 3, 2001 | January 7, 2013 | Chisholm | St. Louis |
| 88th | | Tom Saxhaug | DFL | January 8, 2013 | January 2, 2017 | Grand Rapids | Beltrami Cass Hubbard Itasca |
| 89th | | Tom Saxhaug | DFL | January 8, 2013 | January 2, 2017 | Grand Rapids | Beltrami Cass Hubbard Itasca |
| 90th | | Justin Eichorn | Rep | January 3, 2017 | January 2, 2023 | Grand Rapids | Beltrami Cass Hubbard Itasca |
| 91st | | Justin Eichorn | Rep | January 3, 2017 | January 2, 2023 | Grand Rapids | Beltrami Cass Hubbard Itasca |
| 92nd | | Justin Eichorn | Rep | January 3, 2017 | January 2, 2023 | Grand Rapids | Beltrami Cass Hubbard Itasca |
| 93rd | | Paul Utke | Rep | January 2, 2023 | Incumbent | Grand Rapids | Beltrami Cass Hubbard Itasca |
| 94th | | Paul Utke | Rep | January 2, 2023 | Incumbent | Grand Rapids | Beltrami Cass Hubbard Itasca |
