= 13th Minnesota Legislature =

1871 legislative session

Thirteenth Minnesota Legislature
←	12th Minnesota Legislature	14th Minnesota Legislature	→
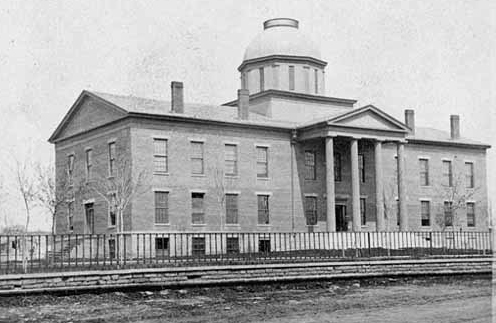

Overview
- Legislative body: Minnesota Legislature
- Jurisdiction: Minnesota, United States
- Term: January 3, 1871 – January 1, 1872
- Website: www.leg.state.mn.us

Minnesota State Senate
- Members: 22 Senators
- Lieutenant Governor: William H. Yale
- Party control: Republican Party

Minnesota House of Representatives
- Members: 47 Representatives
- Speaker: John L. Merriam
- Party control: Republican Party

The thirteenth Minnesota Legislature first convened on January 3, 1871. The 11 members of the Minnesota Senate who represented odd-numbered districts were chosen in the General Election of November 2, 1869, while the 11 members of the Minnesota Senate who represented even-numbered districts, and the 47 members of the Minnesota House of Representatives, were chosen in the General Election of November 8, 1870.

== Sessions ==
The legislature met in a regular session from January 3, 1871 to March 3, 1871. There were no special sessions of the 13th Minnesota Legislature.

== Party summary ==
=== Senate ===
	Party (Shading indicates majority caucus)			Total	Vacant
	Dem.	Ind.	Rep.	Total	Vacant
End of previous Legislature	8	0	14	22	0
Begin	8	2	12	22	0
Latest voting share	36%	9%	55%		
Beginning of the next Legislature	10	0	31	41	0

=== House of Representatives ===
	Party (Shading indicates majority caucus)			Total	Vacant
	Dem.	Ind.	Rep.	Total	Vacant
End of previous Legislature	18	0	29	47	0
Begin	12	2	33	47	0
February 7, 1871	13	2	32	47	0
Latest voting share	28%	4%	68%		
Beginning of the next Legislature	36	0	70	106	0

== Leadership ==
=== Senate ===
Lieutenant Governor
William H. Yale (R-Winona)

=== House of Representatives ===
Speaker of the House
John L. Merriam (R-Saint Paul)

== Members ==
=== Senate ===
Name	District	City	Party
Baxter, Luther Loren	21	Chaska	Democratic
Becker, George Loomis	01	Saint Paul	Democratic
Bonniwell Jr., William T.	06	Hutchinson	Independent
Buck, Cornelius F.	11	Winona	Democratic
Buell, David L.	13	Caledonia	Democratic
Case, John Higley	08	Faribault	Republican
Chewning, Reuben J.	07	Farmington	Democratic
Doran, Michael	22	Le Sueur	Democratic
Farmer, John Quincy	14	Spring Valley	Republican
Hill, Charles	09	Pine Island	Republican
Hodges, Leonard B.	12	Oronoco	Democratic
Lord, Samuel	15	Mantorville	Republican
MacDonald, John Louis	18	Shakopee	Democratic
Pettit, Curtis H.	05	Minneapolis	Republican
Pfaender, William	19	New Ulm	Republican
Pillsbury, John Sargent	04	Saint Anthony	Republican
Sabin, Dwight May	02	Stillwater	Republican
Smith, Benjamin F.	17	Castle Garden	Republican
Tefft, Nathaniel S.	10	Plainview	Independent
Thompson, Clark W.	20	Wells	Republican
Waite, Henry Chester	03	Saint Cloud	Republican
Whallon, George W.	20	Unknown	Republican
Young, William C.	16	Waseca	Republican

=== House of Representatives ===
Name	District	City	Party
Atwater, J. E.	14	Rushford	Republican
Barton, Ara	08	Northfield	Democratic
Brisbane, William	16	Wilton	Democratic
Bullis, L. H.	22	Waterville	Democratic
Chamberlain, George C.	20	Jackson	Republican
Colburn, Nathan Pierce	14	Preston	Republican
Collier, F. J.	10	Wabasha	Independent
Cool, John M.	11	Saint Charles	Democratic
Couplin, William L.	19	Saint Peter	Republican
Davis, F. B.	16	Owatonna	Republican
Densmore, Sr., Orin	09	Red Wing	Republican
Eyre, Daniel E.	07	Hastings	Republican
Flannegan, John H.	07	Rich Valley	Democratic
Flood, J. A.C.	21	Watertown	Republican
Fowler, Andrew J.	10	Lake City	Independent
Fridley, Abram McCormick	04	Becker	Democratic
Gilbertson, Teman	13	Spring Grove	Republican
Greenleaf, William Henry	06	Greenleaf	Republican
Griswold, Henry S.	14	Chatfield	Republican
Hall, Albert R.	05	Dayton	Republican
Haskell, Joseph	02	Afton	Republican
Honner, J. S.G.	19	Beaver Falls	Republican
Hubbell, James B.	17	Mankato	Republican
Hyde, Sam Y. (Note: Legislators Past & Present notes that Hyde's middle initial is listed as V. in Toensing, but Y. in The Minnesota Legislative Manuals, 1869 and 1871. The Journal of the House of Representatives of the Eleventh Session of the Legislature of the State of Minnesota and the Journal of the House of Representatives of the Thirteenth Session of the Legislature of the State of Minnesota both list Hyde as "S. Y. Hyde", creating a presumption that Hyde's middle initial was Y.)	11	Saint Charles	Republican
Jackson, A. P.	09	Hader	Republican
Johnson, Tosten	13	Spring Grove	Republican
Jones, Richard A.	12	Rochester	Democratic
Marvin, Luke	03	Duluth	Republican
Meagher, John F.	17	Mankato	Democratic
Merriam, John L.	01	Saint Paul	Republican
Moore, William S.	03	Saint Cloud	Democratic
Page, Harlan W.	15	Austin	Republican
Patchen, A. L.	20	Unknown	Democratic
Pearson, Trued G.	09	Red Wing	Republican
Phelps, Thomas W.	12	Marion	Republican
Platt, Henry	08	Warsaw	Republican
Railson, Andrew	06	Norway Lake	Republican
Sencerbox, W. V.	18	Shakopee	Democratic
Sibley, Henry Hastings	01	Saint Paul	Democratic
Somerville, William	12	Eyota	Republican
Stahlman, Christopher	01	Saint Paul	Democratic
Stannard, Lucius K.	02	Taylors Falls	Republican
Telfer, W. G.	15	Le Roy	Republican
Underwood, A. J.	05	Long Lake	Republican
Valder, Hans	14	Newburg	Republican
Vale, J. Q. A.	11	Homer	Republican
Washburn, Sr., William Drew	05	Minneapolis	Republican
Wedge, Albert Clark	16	Albert Lea	Republican

== Membership changes ==
=== Senate ===
District	Vacated by	Reason for change	Successor	Date successor seated
20	George W. Whallon (R)	Although Whallon was initially seated when the session began, the seat was contested by Thompson. On January 31, 1871, the Senate determined that Thompson was entitled to the seat.	Clark W. Thompson (R)	January 31, 1871

=== House of Representatives ===
District	Vacated by	Reason for change	Successor	Date successor seated
20	George C. Chamberlain (R)	Although Chamberlain was initially seated when the session began, the seat was contested by Patchen. On February 7, 1871, after having uncovered evidence of gross election fraud on the part of Chamberlain, the House of Representatives determined that Patchen was entitled to the seat.	A. L. Patchen (D)	February 7, 1871

== Notes ==
Preceded by Twelfth Minnesota Legislature	Thirteenth Minnesota Legislature; 1871	Succeeded by 14th Minnesota Legislature
