= 12th Minnesota Legislature =

1870 legislative session

Twelfth Minnesota Legislature
←	11th Minnesota Legislature	13th Minnesota Legislature	→
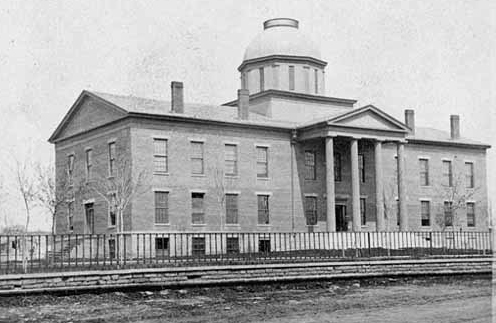

Overview
- Legislative body: Minnesota Legislature
- Jurisdiction: Minnesota, United States
- Term: January 4, 1870 – January 2, 1871
- Website: www.leg.state.mn.us

Minnesota State Senate
- Members: 22 Senators
- Lieutenant Governor: William H. Yale
- Party control: Republican Party

Minnesota House of Representatives
- Members: 47 Representatives
- Speaker: John L. Merriam
- Party control: Republican Party

The twelfth Minnesota Legislature first convened on January 4, 1870. The 11 members of the Minnesota Senate who represented even-numbered districts were chosen in the General Election of November 3, 1868, while the 11 members of the Minnesota Senate who represented odd-numbered districts, and the 47 members of the Minnesota House of Representatives, were chosen in the General Election of November 2, 1869.

== Sessions ==
The legislature met in a regular session from January 4, 1870 to March 4, 1870. There were no special sessions of the 12th Minnesota Legislature.

== Party summary ==
=== Senate ===
	Party (Shading indicates majority caucus)			Total	Vacant
	Dem.	Ind.	Rep.	Total	Vacant
End of previous Legislature	6	0	16	22	0
Begin	8	0	14	22	0
Latest voting share	36%	0%	64%		
Beginning of the next Legislature	8	2	12	22	0

=== House of Representatives ===
	Party (Shading indicates majority caucus)			Total	Vacant
	Dem.	Ind.	Rep.	Total	Vacant
End of previous Legislature	9	0	38	47	0
Begin	18	0	29	47	0
Latest voting share	38%	0%	62%		
Beginning of the next Legislature	12	2	33	47	0

== Leadership ==
=== Senate ===
Lieutenant Governor
William H. Yale (R-Winona)

=== House of Representatives ===
Speaker of the House
John L. Merriam (R-Saint Paul)

== Members ==
=== Senate ===
Name	District	City	Party
Batchelder, George Washington	08	Faribault	Republican
Baxter, Luther Loren	21	Chaska	Democratic
Becker, George Loomis	01	Saint Paul	Democratic
Buck, Cornelius F.	11	Winona	Democratic
Buell, David L.	13	Caledonia	Democratic
Castle, James Nathan	02	Stillwater	Democratic
Chewning, Reuben J.	07	Farmington	Democratic
Crooker, Josiah B.	16	Owatonna	Republican
Henry, William	18	Belle Plaine	Democratic
Hill, Charles	09	Pine Island	Republican
Jackson, W. S.	10	Wabasha	Republican
King, Dana E.	06	Greenleaf	Republican
Latimer, Jacob A.	20	Winnebago City	Republican
Leonard, Joseph A.	12	Rochester	Republican
Lochren, William	04	Saint Anthony	Democratic
Lord, Samuel	15	Mantorville	Republican
Pettit, Curtis H.	05	Minneapolis	Republican
Pfaender, William	19	New Ulm	Republican
Smith, Benjamin F.	17	Castle Garden	Republican
Smith, Edson R.	22	Le Sueur	Republican
Sprague, Benjamin D.	14	Rushford	Republican
Waite, Henry Chester	03	Saint Cloud	Republican

=== House of Representatives ===
Name	District	City	Party
Abbott, B.	06	Harrison	Republican
Barton, William	14	Lenora	Republican
Bratrud, Ole C.	14	Preston	Republican
Brown, Hosmer A. (Note: The newspaper Minnesota Staats-Zeitung listed a Democrat by the name of L. E. Pierce as having won the 1869 election in the 15th district, alongside George Mansfield Cameron. However, Legislators Past & Present and the Journal of the House of Representatives of the Twelfth Session of the Legislature of the State of Minnesota both list Brown as having been seated when the 12th Legislature convened.)	15	Mower City	Republican
John Bullen	11	Elba	Democratic
Cameron, Sr., George Mansfield	15	Austin	Democratic
Canfield, S. G.	14	Canfield	Democratic
Close, William	08	Dodge City	Republican
Cool, John M.	11	Saint Charles	Democratic
Couplin, William L.	19	Saint Peter	Republican
Crandall, R.	17	Shelbyville	Republican
Cullen, J. K.	21	Watertown	Democratic
Densmore, Sr., Orin	09	Red Wing	Republican
Drought, Henry	08	Dundas	Republican
Faber, Paul	01	Saint Paul	Democratic
Flannegan, John H.	07	Hastings	Democratic
Fowler, Andrew J.	10	Lake City	Democratic
Fridley, Abram McCormick	04	Becker	Democratic
Gage, John	10	Minneiska	Republican
Gilman, John M.	01	Saint Paul	Democratic
Graham, S. W.	12	Eyota	Republican
Hall, Albert R.	05	Dayton	Republican
Jones, William	07	Hastings	Democratic
Larson, B. S.	12	Byron	Republican
Lowell, William	02	Marine	Republican
MacDonald, John Louis	18	Shakopee	Democratic
Meagher, John F.	17	Mankato	Democratic
Merriam, John L.	01	Saint Paul	Republican
Miller, John	09	Wastedo	Republican
Norris, James S.	02	Cottage Grove	Democratic
Pfaar, John A.	22	Le Sueur	Democratic
Potter, William E.	13	La Crescent	Republican
Pound, Joseph H.	05	Richfield	Democratic
Reed, Axel Hayford	06	Glencoe	Republican
Rice, E. A.	05	Minneapolis	Republican
Ruliffson, H. W.	16	Cooleyville	Republican
Scanlan, M.	14	Lanesboro	Democratic
Shanks, Michael E.L.	20	Fairmont	Republican
Slocum, Giles	09	Cannon Falls	Republican
Stewart, Charles N.	12	Stewartville	Republican
Swift, P. H.	19	Beaver Falls	Republican
Thorson, Isaac	03	Gilchrist	Republican
Vance, Nathan	13	Money Creek	Republican
Waterman, Chauncey N.	11	Winona	Republican
Wedge, Albert Clark	16	Albert Lea	Republican
Wilson, John L.	03	Saint Cloud	Democratic
Young, William C.	16	Waseca	Republican

== Notes ==
Preceded by Eleventh Minnesota Legislature	Twelfth Minnesota Legislature; 1870	Succeeded by Thirteenth Minnesota Legislature
