= Minnesota's 12th Senate district =

American legislative district

Minnesota's 12th State Senate district
Senator
Torrey Westrom; R–Elbow Lake, Grant County

The Minnesota's 12th Senate District is one of 67 Minnesota State Senate districts. It encompasses parts of Big Stone County, Douglas County, Grant County, Pope County, Stearns County, Stevens County, Swift County, Traverse County and Wilkin County. The seat has been held by Republican Torrey Westrom of Elbow Lake, Minnesota since 2013.

== List of senators ==
List of Minnesota State senators from District 12
Session	Image	Senator	Party	Term start	Term end	Residence	Counties represented	Ref.
1st		James Ridpath	N/A	December 2, 1857	December 6, 1859	Tepeeota	Wabasha County.	
2nd		John T. Averill	N/A	December 7, 1859	January 7, 1861	Lake City	Wabasha County.	
3rd		Stiles P. Jones	N/A	January 8, 1861	September 25, 1861	Rochester	Olmsted County.	
3rd		Vacant		September 26, 1861	January 6, 1862		Olmsted County.	
4th		John V. Daniels	Republican	January 7, 1862	January 4, 1869	Rochester	Olmsted and Wabasha counties.	
5th		John V. Daniels	N/A	January 7, 1862	January 4, 1869	Rochester	Olmsted County.	
6th		John V. Daniels	N/A	January 7, 1862	January 4, 1869	Rochester	Olmsted County.	
7th		John V. Daniels	N/A	January 7, 1862	January 4, 1869	Rochester	Olmsted County.	
8th		John V. Daniels	N/A	January 7, 1862	January 4, 1869	Rochester	Olmsted County.	
9th		John V. Daniels	Republican	January 7, 1862	January 4, 1869	Rochester	Olmsted County.	
10th		John V. Daniels	Republican	January 7, 1862	January 4, 1869	Rochester	Olmsted County.	
11th		Joseph A. Leonard	Republican	January 5, 1869	January 2, 1871	Rochester	Olmsted County.	
12th		Joseph A. Leonard	N/A	January 5, 1869	January 2, 1871	Rochester	Olmsted County.	
13th		Leonard B. Hodges	N/A	January 3, 1871	January 1, 1872	Oronoco	Olmsted County.	
14th		Amos Coggswell	N/A	January 2, 1872	January 3, 1876	Aurora	Steele County.	
15th		Amos Coggswell	Democratic	January 2, 1872	January 3, 1876	Aurora	Steele County.	
16th		Amos Coggswell	N/A	January 2, 1872	January 3, 1876	Aurora	Steele County.	
17th		Amos Coggswell	N/A	January 2, 1872	January 3, 1876	Aurora	Steele County.	
18th		Louis L. Wheelock	Republican	January 4, 1876	January 7, 1878	Owatonna	Steele County.	
19th		Louis L. Wheelock	Republican	January 4, 1876	January 7, 1878	Owatonna	Steele County.	
20th		Eli W. Morehouse	Democratic	January 8, 1878	January 6, 1879	Owatonna	Steele County.	
21st		W. W. Wilkins	N/A	January 7, 1879	January 1, 1883	Medford	Steele County.	
22nd		W. W. Wilkins	N/A	January 7, 1879	January 1, 1883	Medford	Steele County.	
23rd		Adam C. Hickman	N/A	January 2, 1883	January 3, 1887	Owatonna	Steele County.	
24th		Adam C. Hickman	N/A	January 2, 1883	January 3, 1887	Owatonna	Steele County.	
25th		Charles Schretz Crandell	Republican	January 4, 1887	January 5, 1891	Owatonna	Steele County.	
26th		Charles Schretz Crandell	Republican	January 4, 1887	January 5, 1891	Owatonna	Steele County.	
27th		Charles Schretz Crandell	Republican	January 4, 1887	January 5, 1891	Owatonna	Steele County.	
28th		Charles Schretz Crandell	Republican	January 4, 1887	January 5, 1891	Owatonna	Steele County.	
29th		Wesley A. Sperry	Republican	January 8, 1895	January 2, 1899	Owatonna	Steele County.	
30th		Wesley A. Sperry	Republican	January 8, 1895	January 2, 1899	Owatonna	Steele County.	
31st		George D. McArthur	Republican	January 3, 1899	January 5, 1903	Blue Earth City	Faribault County.	
32nd		George D. McArthur	Republican	January 3, 1899	January 5, 1903	Blue Earth City	Faribault County.	
33rd		Frank E. Putnam	Republican	January 6, 1903	January 4, 1915	Blue Earth	Faribault County.	
34th		Frank E. Putnam	Republican	January 6, 1903	January 4, 1915	Blue Earth	Faribault County.	
35th		Frank E. Putnam	Republican	January 6, 1903	January 4, 1915	Blue Earth	Faribault County.	
36th		Frank E. Putnam	Republican	January 6, 1903	January 4, 1915	Blue Earth	Faribault County.	
37th		Frank E. Putnam	Republican	January 6, 1903	January 4, 1915	Blue Earth	Faribault County.	
38th		Frank E. Putnam	Republican	January 6, 1903	January 4, 1915	Blue Earth	Faribault County.	
39th		John Steffen	Nonpartisan	January 5, 1915	January 6, 1919	Troy	Lincoln, Murray and Pipestone counties.	
40th		John Steffen	Nonpartisan	January 5, 1915	January 6, 1919	Troy	Lincoln, Murray and Pipestone counties.	
41st		Floyd E. Lindsley	Nonpartisan	January 7, 1919	January 1, 1923	Garvin	Lincoln, Murray and Pipestone counties.	
42nd		Floyd E. Lindsley	Nonpartisan	January 7, 1919	January 1, 1923	Garvin	Lincoln, Murray and Pipestone counties.	
43rd		Louis P. Johnson	Nonpartisan	January 2, 1923	January 5, 1931	Ivanhoe	Lincoln, Murray and Pipestone counties.	
44th		Louis P. Johnson	Nonpartisan	January 2, 1923	January 5, 1931	Ivanhoe	Lincoln, Murray and Pipestone counties.	
45th		Louis P. Johnson	Nonpartisan	January 2, 1923	January 5, 1931	Ivanhoe	Lincoln, Murray and Pipestone counties.	
46th		Louis P. Johnson	Nonpartisan	January 2, 1923	January 5, 1931	Ivanhoe	Lincoln, Murray and Pipestone counties.	
47th		John Vincent Webber	Nonpartisan	January 6, 1931	October 4, 1946	Slayton	Lincoln, Murray and Pipestone counties.	
48th		John Vincent Webber	Nonpartisan	January 6, 1931	October 4, 1946	Slayton	Lincoln, Murray and Pipestone counties.	
49th		John Vincent Webber	Nonpartisan	January 6, 1931	October 4, 1946	Slayton	Lincoln, Murray and Pipestone counties.	
50th		John Vincent Webber	Nonpartisan	January 6, 1931	October 4, 1946	Slayton	Lincoln, Murray and Pipestone counties.	
51st		John Vincent Webber	Nonpartisan	January 6, 1931	October 4, 1946	Slayton	Lincoln, Murray and Pipestone counties.	
52nd		John Vincent Webber	Nonpartisan	January 6, 1931	October 4, 1946	Slayton	Lincoln, Murray and Pipestone counties.	
53rd		John Vincent Webber	Nonpartisan	January 6, 1931	October 4, 1946	Slayton	Lincoln, Murray and Pipestone counties.	
54th		John Vincent Webber	Nonpartisan	January 6, 1931	October 4, 1946	Slayton	Lincoln, Murray and Pipestone counties.	
54th		Vacant		October 5, 1956	January 6, 1946		Lincoln, Murray and Pipestone counties.	
55th		Hans Pederson	Nonpartisan	January 7, 1947	January 3, 1954	Ruthton	Lincoln, Murray and Pipestone counties.	
56th		Hans Pederson	Nonpartisan	January 7, 1947	January 3, 1954	Ruthton	Lincoln, Murray and Pipestone counties.	
57th		Hans Pederson	Conservative	January 7, 1947	January 3, 1954	Ruthton	Lincoln, Murray and Pipestone counties.	
58th		Hans Pederson	Conservative	January 7, 1947	January 3, 1954	Ruthton	Lincoln, Murray and Pipestone counties.	
59th		Joseph Vadheim	Conservative	January 4, 1955	January 7, 1963	Tyler	Lincoln, Murray and Pipestone counties.	
60th		Joseph Vadheim	Conservative	January 4, 1955	January 7, 1963	Tyler	Lincoln, Murray and Pipestone counties.	
61st		Joseph Vadheim	Conservative	January 4, 1955	January 7, 1963	Tyler	Lincoln, Murray and Pipestone counties.	
62nd		Joseph Vadheim	Conservative	January 4, 1955	January 7, 1963	Tyler	Lincoln, Murray and Pipestone counties.	
63rd		Michael McGuire	Liberal	January 8, 1963	January 2, 1967	Montgomery	Le Sueur and Scott counties.	
64th		Michael McGuire	Liberal	January 8, 1963	January 2, 1967	Montgomery	Le Sueur and Scott counties.	
65th		Rollin Glewwe	Conservative	January 3, 1967	January 1, 1973	South Saint Paul	Dakota County.	
66th		Rollin Glewwe	Conservative	January 3, 1967	January 1, 1973	South Saint Paul	Dakota County.	
67th		Rollin Glewwe	Conservative	January 3, 1967	January 1, 1973	South Saint Paul	Dakota County.	
68th		Myrton Wegener	DFL	January 2, 1973	January 3, 1983	Bertha	Mille Lacs, Morrison and Todd counties.	
69th		Myrton Wegener	DFL	January 2, 1973	January 3, 1983	Bertha	Mille Lacs, Morrison and Todd counties.	
70th		Myrton Wegener	DFL	January 2, 1973	January 3, 1983	Bertha	Mille Lacs, Morrison and Todd counties.	
71st		Myrton Wegener	DFL	January 2, 1973	January 3, 1983	Bertha	Mille Lacs, Morrison and Todd counties.	
72nd		Myrton Wegener	DFL	January 2, 1973	January 3, 1983	Bertha	Mille Lacs, Morrison and Todd counties.	
73rd		Don Anderson	Independent Republican	January 4, 1983	January 7, 1991	Wadena	Douglas, Otter Tail, Todd and Wadena counties.	
74th		Don Anderson	Independent Republican	January 4, 1983	January 7, 1991	Wadena	Douglas, Otter Tail, Todd and Wadena counties.	
75th		Don Anderson	Independent Republican	January 4, 1983	January 7, 1991	Wadena	Douglas, Otter Tail, Todd and Wadena counties.	
76th		Don Anderson	Independent Republican	January 4, 1983	January 7, 1991	Wadena	Douglas, Otter Tail, Todd and Wadena counties.	
77th		Dallas Sams	DFL	January 8, 1991	January 4, 1991	Staples	Douglas, Otter Tail, Todd and Wadena counties.	
78th		Don Samuelson	DFL	January 5, 1993	January 6, 2003	Brainerd	Cass, Crow Wing and Morrison counties.	
79th		Don Samuelson	DFL	January 5, 1993	January 6, 2003	Brainerd	Cass, Crow Wing and Morrison counties.	
80th		Don Samuelson	DFL	January 5, 1993	January 6, 2003	Brainerd	Cass, Crow Wing and Morrison counties.	
81st		Don Samuelson	DFL	January 5, 1993	January 6, 2003	Brainerd	Cass, Crow Wing and Morrison counties.	
82nd		Don Samuelson	DFL	January 5, 1993	January 6, 2003	Brainerd	Cass, Crow Wing and Morrison counties.	
83rd		Paul Koering	Republican	January 7, 2003	January 3, 2011	Fort Ripley	Crow Wing and Morrison counties.	
84th		Paul Koering	Republican	January 7, 2003	January 3, 2011	Fort Ripley	Crow Wing and Morrison counties.	
85th		Paul Koering	Republican	January 7, 2003	January 3, 2011	Fort Ripley	Crow Wing and Morrison counties.	
86th		Paul Koering	Republican	January 7, 2003	January 3, 2011	Fort Ripley	Crow Wing and Morrison counties.	
87th		Paul Gazelka	Republican	January 4, 2011	January 7, 2013	Brainerd	Crow Wing and Morrison counties.	
88th		Torrey Westrom	Republican	January 8, 2013	Incumbent	Elbow Lake	Big Stone, Douglas, Grant, Pope, Stearns, Stevens, Swift, Traverse and Wilkin counties.	
89th		Torrey Westrom	Republican	January 8, 2013	Incumbent	Elbow Lake	Big Stone, Douglas, Grant, Pope, Stearns, Stevens, Swift, Traverse and Wilkin counties.	
90th		Torrey Westrom	Republican	January 8, 2013	Incumbent	Elbow Lake	Big Stone, Douglas, Grant, Pope, Stearns, Stevens, Swift, Traverse and Wilkin counties.	
91st		Torrey Westrom	Republican	January 8, 2013	Incumbent	Elbow Lake	Big Stone, Douglas, Grant, Pope, Stearns, Stevens, Swift, Traverse and Wilkin counties.	
92nd		Torrey Westrom	Republican	January 8, 2013	Incumbent	Elbow Lake	Big Stone, Douglas, Grant, Pope, Stearns, Stevens, Swift	
93rd		Torrey Westrom	Republican	January 8, 2013	Incumbent	Elbow Lake	Big Stone, Douglas, Grant, Pope, Stearns, Stevens, Swift	
94th		Torrey Westrom	Republican	January 8, 2013	Incumbent	Elbow Lake	Big Stone, Douglas, Grant, Pope, Stearns, Stevens, Swift	
