= Minnesota's 9th Senate district =

American legislative district

Minnesota's 9th State Senate district
Senator
Jordan Rasmusson; R–Fergus Falls
- Population: 84,863

Minnesota Senate District 9 represents Grant County, Otter Tail County, Traverse County, Wilkin County, and parts of Douglas County. For the current legislative session, District 9 is represented by Jordan Rasmusson.

== List of senators ==
Session	Image	Senator	Party	Term start	Term end	Home	Location
1st		Samuel Hull	Non	December 2, 1857	December 6, 1859	Carimona	Fillmore Houston Mower
1st		John R. Jones	Dem	December 2, 1857	December 6, 1859	Chatfield	Fillmore Houston Mower
2nd		Contested		December 6, 1859	January 6, 1860		Fillmore
2nd		Reuben Wells	Non	January 6, 1860	January 7, 1861	Chatfield	Fillmore
2nd		Henry W. Holley	Rep	January 6, 1860	January 6, 1862	Chatfield	Fillmore
3rd		Henry W. Holley	Rep	January 6, 1860	January 6, 1862	Chatfield	Fillmore
4th		Charles McClure	Rep	January 7, 1862	January 4, 1864	Red Wing	Goodhue
5th		Charles McClure	Rep	January 7, 1862	January 4, 1864	Red Wing	Goodhue
6th		Joseph A. Thatcher	Rep	January 5, 1864	January 7, 1867	Zumbrota	Goodhue
7th		Joseph A. Thatcher	Rep	January 5, 1864	January 7, 1867	Zumbrota	Goodhue
8th		Joseph A. Thatcher	Rep	January 5, 1864	January 7, 1867	Zumbrota	Goodhue
9th		Warren Henry Bristol	Rep	January 8, 1867	January 3, 1870	Red Wing	Goodhue
10th		Warren Henry Bristol	Rep	January 8, 1867	January 3, 1870	Red Wing	Goodhue
11th		Warren Henry Bristol	Rep	January 8, 1867	January 3, 1870	Red Wing	Goodhue
12th		Charles Hill	Non	January 4, 1870	January 1, 1872	Pine Island	Goodhue
13th		Charles Hill	Non	January 4, 1870	January 1, 1872	Pine Island	Goodhue
14th		Milo White	Rep	January 2, 1872	January 1, 1877	Elmira	Olmsted
15th		Milo White	Rep	January 2, 1872	January 1, 1877	Elmira	Olmsted
16th		Milo White	Rep	January 2, 1872	January 1, 1877	Elmira	Olmsted
17th		Milo White	Rep	January 2, 1872	January 1, 1877	Elmira	Olmsted
18th		Milo White	Rep	January 2, 1872	January 1, 1877	Elmira	Olmsted
19th		Burr Deuel	Rep	January 2, 1877	January 6, 1879	Quincy	Olmsted
20th		Burr Deuel	Rep	January 2, 1877	January 6, 1879	Quincy	Olmsted
21st		Orin H. Page	Greenback	January 7, 1879	January 3, 1881	Pleasant Grove	Olmsted
22nd		Milo White	Rep	January 4, 1881	January 1, 1883	Elmira	Olmsted
23rd		Samuel D. Peterson	Rep	January 2, 1883	January 3, 1887	New Ulm	Brown Redwood
24th		Samuel D. Peterson	Rep	January 2, 1883	January 3, 1887	New Ulm	Brown Redwood
25th		Thomas Evans Bowen	Dem	January 4, 1887	January 5, 1891	Sleepy Eye	Brown Redwood
26th		Thomas Evans Bowen	Dem	January 4, 1887	January 5, 1891	Sleepy Eye	Brown Redwood
27th		Samuel D. Peterson	Rep	January 6, 1891	January 7, 1895	New Ulm	Brown Redwood
28th		Samuel D. Peterson	Rep	January 6, 1891	January 7, 1895	New Ulm	Brown Redwood
29th		E.D. French	Rep	January 8, 1895	January 2, 1899	Redwood Falls	Brown Redwood
30th		E.D. French	Rep	January 8, 1895	January 2, 1899	Redwood Falls	Brown Redwood
31st		Thorvald V. Knatvold	Rep	January 3, 1899	January 5, 1903	Albert Lea	Freeborn
32nd		Thorvald V. Knatvold	Rep	January 3, 1899	January 5, 1903	Albert Lea	Freeborn
33rd		Henry A. Morgan	Rep	January 6, 1903	January 7, 1907	Albert Lea	Freeborn
34th		Henry A. Morgan	Rep	January 6, 1903	January 7, 1907	Albert Lea	Freeborn
35th		Bernhart N. Anderson	Rep	January 8, 1907	January 4, 1915	Hartland	Freeborn
36th		Bernhart N. Anderson	Rep	January 8, 1907	January 4, 1915	Hartland	Freeborn
37th		Bernhart N. Anderson	Rep	January 8, 1907	January 4, 1915	Hartland	Freeborn
38th		Bernhart N. Anderson	Rep	January 8, 1907	January 4, 1915	Hartland	Freeborn
39th		Albert L. Ward	Non	January 5, 1915	January 1, 1923	Fairmont	Martin Watonwan
40th		Albert L. Ward	Non	January 5, 1915	January 1, 1923	Fairmont	Martin Watonwan
41st		Albert L. Ward	Non	January 5, 1915	January 1, 1923	Fairmont	Martin Watonwan
42nd		Albert L. Ward	Non	January 5, 1915	January 1, 1923	Fairmont	Martin Watonwan
43rd		John M. Gemmill	Non	January 2, 1923	January 3, 1927	Sherburn	Martin Watonwan
44th		John M. Gemmill	Non	January 2, 1923	January 3, 1927	Sherburn	Martin Watonwan
45th		Frank A. Day	Ind	January 4, 1927	December 27, 1928	Fairmont	Martin Watonwan
		Vacant		December 27, 1928	January 21, 1929		Martin Watonwan
46th		Henry August Saggau	Dem	January 21, 1929	January 5, 1931	Ceylon	Martin Watonwan
47th		Roy F. Crowley	Non	January 6, 1931	January 2, 1939	St. James	Martin Watonwan
48th		Roy F. Crowley	Non	January 6, 1931	January 2, 1939	St. James	Martin Watonwan
49th		Roy F. Crowley	Non	January 6, 1931	January 2, 1939	St. James	Martin Watonwan
50th		Roy F. Crowley	Non	January 6, 1931	January 2, 1939	St. James	Martin Watonwan
51st		Frank Dougherty	Non	January 3, 1939	January 1, 1951	Fairmont	Martin Watonwan
52nd		Frank Dougherty	Non	January 3, 1939	January 1, 1951	Fairmont	Martin Watonwan
53rd		Frank Dougherty	Non	January 3, 1939	January 1, 1951	Fairmont	Martin Watonwan
54th		Frank Dougherty	Non	January 3, 1939	January 1, 1951	Fairmont	Martin Watonwan
55th		Frank Dougherty	Non	January 3, 1939	January 1, 1951	Fairmont	Martin Watonwan
56th		Frank Dougherty	Non	January 3, 1939	January 1, 1951	Fairmont	Martin Watonwan
57th		Chris L. Erickson	Con	January 2, 1951	January 7, 1963	Fairmont	Martin Watonwan
58th		Chris L. Erickson	Con	January 2, 1951	January 7, 1963	Fairmont	Martin Watonwan
59th		Chris L. Erickson	Con	January 2, 1951	January 7, 1963	Fairmont	Martin Watonwan
60th		Chris L. Erickson	Con	January 2, 1951	January 7, 1963	Fairmont	Martin Watonwan
61st		Chris L. Erickson	Con	January 2, 1951	January 7, 1963	Fairmont	Martin Watonwan
62nd		Chris L. Erickson	Con	January 2, 1951	January 7, 1963	Fairmont	Martin Watonwan
63rd		Rudolph Hanson	Con	January 8, 1963	January 4, 1971	Albert Lea	Freeborn Waseca
64th		Rudolph Hanson	Con	January 8, 1963	January 4, 1971	Albert Lea	Freeborn Waseca
65th		Rudolph Hanson	Con	January 8, 1963	January 4, 1971	Albert Lea	Freeborn Waseca
66th		Rudolph Hanson	Con	January 8, 1963	January 4, 1971	Albert Lea	Freeborn Waseca
67th		Paul P. Overgaard	Con	January 5, 1971	January 1, 1973	Albert Lea	Freeborn Waseca
68th		Doug Sillers	Con	January 2, 1973	January 5, 1981	Moorhead	Clay Otter Tail Wilkin
69th		Doug Sillers	Ind. Rep	January 2, 1973	January 5, 1981	Moorhead	Clay Otter Tail Wilkin
70th		Doug Sillers	Ind. Rep	January 2, 1973	January 5, 1981	Moorhead	Clay Otter Tail Wilkin
71st		Doug Sillers	Ind. Rep	January 2, 1973	January 5, 1981	Moorhead	Clay Otter Tail Wilkin
72nd		Keith Langseth	DFL	January 6, 1981	January 7, 2013	Glyndon	Clay Otter Tail Wilkin
73rd		Keith Langseth	DFL	January 6, 1981	January 7, 2013	Glyndon	Becker Clay Otter Tail Wilkin
74th		Keith Langseth	DFL	January 6, 1981	January 7, 2013	Glyndon	Becker Clay Otter Tail Wilkin
75th		Keith Langseth	DFL	January 6, 1981	January 7, 2013	Glyndon	Becker Clay Otter Tail Wilkin
76th		Keith Langseth	DFL	January 6, 1981	January 7, 2013	Glyndon	Becker Clay Otter Tail Wilkin
77th		Keith Langseth	DFL	January 6, 1981	January 7, 2013	Glyndon	Becker Clay Otter Tail Wilkin
78th		Keith Langseth	DFL	January 6, 1981	January 7, 2013	Glyndon	Becker Clay Otter Tail Wilkin
79th		Keith Langseth	DFL	January 6, 1981	January 7, 2013	Glyndon	Becker Clay Otter Tail Wilkin
80th		Keith Langseth	DFL	January 6, 1981	January 7, 2013	Glyndon	Becker Clay Otter Tail Wilkin
81st		Keith Langseth	DFL	January 6, 1981	January 7, 2013	Glyndon	Becker Clay Otter Tail Wilkin
82nd		Keith Langseth	DFL	January 6, 1981	January 7, 2013	Glyndon	Becker Clay Otter Tail Wilkin
83rd		Keith Langseth	DFL	January 6, 1981	January 7, 2013	Glyndon	Becker Clay Otter Tail Wilkin
84th		Keith Langseth	DFL	January 6, 1981	January 7, 2013	Glyndon	Becker Clay Traverse Wilkin
85th		Keith Langseth	DFL	January 6, 1981	January 7, 2013	Glyndon	Becker Clay Traverse Wilkin
86th		Keith Langseth	DFL	January 6, 1981	January 7, 2013	Glyndon	Becker Clay Traverse Wilkin
87th		Keith Langseth	DFL	January 6, 1981	January 7, 2013	Glyndon	Becker Clay Traverse Wilkin
88th		Paul Gazelka	Rep	January 8, 2013	January 3, 2023	Nisswa	Cass Morrison Todd Wadena
89th		Paul Gazelka	Rep	January 8, 2013	January 3, 2023	Nisswa	Cass Morrison Todd Wadena
90th		Paul Gazelka	Rep	January 8, 2013	January 3, 2023	Nisswa	Cass Morrison Todd Wadena
91st		Paul Gazelka	Rep	January 8, 2013	January 3, 2023	Nisswa	Cass Morrison Todd Wadena
92nd		Paul Gazelka	Rep	January 8, 2013	January 3, 2023	Nisswa	Cass Morrison Todd Wadena
93rd		Jordan Rasmusson	Rep	January 3, 2023	Incumbent	Fergus Falls	Douglas Grant Otter Tail Traverse Wilkin
94th		Jordan Rasmusson	Rep	January 3, 2023	Incumbent	Fergus Falls	Douglas Grant Otter Tail Traverse Wilkin
