= 9th Minnesota Legislature =

1867 legislative session

Ninth Minnesota Legislature
←	8th Minnesota Legislature	10th Minnesota Legislature	→
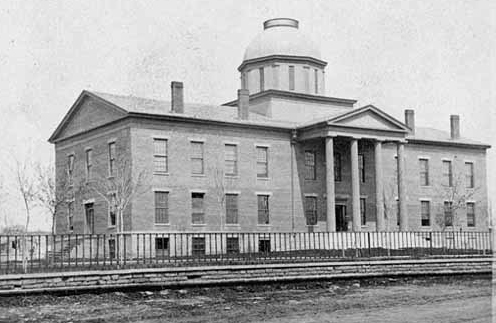

Overview
- Legislative body: Minnesota Legislature
- Jurisdiction: Minnesota, United States
- Term: January 7, 1867 – January 6, 1868
- Website: www.leg.state.mn.us

Minnesota State Senate
- Members: 22 Senators
- Lieutenant Governor: Thomas Henry Armstrong
- Party control: Republican Party

Minnesota House of Representatives
- Members: 47 Representatives
- Speaker: John Q. Farmer
- Party control: Republican Party

The ninth Minnesota Legislature first convened on January 8, 1867. The 22 members of the Minnesota Senate and the 47 members of the Minnesota House of Representatives were elected during the General Election of November 6, 1866. The Minnesota Senate, at the time, was normally elected to staggered terms, but an increase in the number of members to be elected to both houses forced a new election of all members of the Legislature.

== Sessions ==
The legislature met in a regular session from January 8, 1867 to March 8, 1867. There were no special sessions of the 9th Minnesota Legislature.

== Party summary ==
=== Senate ===
	Party (Shading indicates majority caucus)		Total	Vacant
	Democratic	Republican	Total	Vacant
End of previous Legislature	6	15	21	0
Begin	5	17	22	0
Latest voting share	23%	77%		
Beginning of the next Legislature	7	15	22	0

=== House of Representatives ===
	Party (Shading indicates majority caucus)			Total	Vacant
	Democratic	Republican	Unknown	Total	Vacant
End of previous Legislature	13	29	0	42	0
Begin	7	39	1	47	0
January 18, 1867	7	40	0	47	0
Latest voting share	15%	85%	0%		
Beginning of the next Legislature	13	34	0	47	0

== Leadership ==
=== Senate ===
Lieutenant Governor
Thomas Henry Armstrong (R-High Forest)

=== House of Representatives ===
Speaker of the House
John Q. Farmer (R-Spring Valley)

== Members ==
=== Senate ===
Name	District	City	Party
Armstrong, Augustus L.	16	Albert Lea	Republican
Armstrong, J. L.	10	Lake City	Republican
Baxter, Luther Loren	18	Shakopee	Democratic
Bristol, Warren Henry	09	Red Wing	Republican
Buck, Jr., Adam	19	Henderson	Republican
Butters, Reuben	22	Kasota	Democratic
Daniels, John V.	12	Rochester	Republican
Draper, N. C.	07	Hastings	Republican
Evans, Louis A.	03	Saint Cloud	Democratic
Folsom, William Henry Carman	02	Taylors Falls	Republican
Gordon, Hanford Lennox	06	Monticello	Republican
Griggs, Chauncey Wright	21	Chaska	Democratic
Lord, Samuel	15	Mantorville	Republican
Miller, Luke	14	Chatfield	Republican
Murray, William Pitt	01	Saint Paul	Democratic
Perkins, Oscar F.	08	Faribault	Republican
Pillsbury, John Sargent	04	Saint Anthony	Republican
Porter, Jr., Lewis	17	Garden City	Republican
Temple, Daniel F.	13	Wilmington	Republican
Wakefield, James Beach	20	Blue Earth City	Republican
Whitney, J. C.	05	Minneapolis	Republican
Yale, William Hall	11	Winona	Republican

=== House of Representatives ===
Name	District	City	Party
Aaker, Lars K.	09	Alexandria	Republican
Ames, Albert Alonzo	05	Minneapolis	Republican
Andrews, A.	20	Fairmont	Republican
Andrews, Burton S.	13	Caledonia	Republican
Ayres, Ebeneezer	02	Cottage Grove	Republican
Blodgett, H. F.	04	Anoka	Republican
Braden, William W.	14	Lenora	Republican
Brisbane, William	16	Wilton	Democratic
Brown, Charles T.	19	Saint Peter	Republican
Buck, W. W.	11	Sherwood	Republican
Colburn, Nathan Pierce	14	Preston	Republican
Davis, Cushman Kellogg	01	Saint Paul	Republican
Donaldson, James H.	07	Farmington	Republican
Dunnell, Mark Hill	11	Winona	Republican
Farmer, John Quincy	14	Spring Valley	Republican
Felch, Charles J.	15	Hamilton	Republican
Gould, Aaron	05	Eden Prairie	Republican
Hanft, Morris	18	Belle Plaine	Democratic
Hoepner, Henry	03	Unknown	Unknown
Howell, S. C.	07	Waterford	Republican
Jackman, Henry A.	02	Stillwater	Republican
Johnson, Jr., D. B.	15	Austin	Republican
Kemp, S. A.	10	Greenfield Township	Republican
Kennedy, E. H.	13	Houston	Republican
King, Dana E.	06	Greenleaf	Republican
Knapp, F. W.	10	Smithfield	Republican
Lewis, Eli F.	21	Watertown	Democratic
Lienau, Charles H.	01	Saint Paul	Democratic
Maynard, Arba K.	22	Cleveland	Democratic
Miner, Nelson H.	03	Sauk Centre	Democratic
Mitchell, J. T.	09	Zumbrota	Republican
Oleson, Gulick	14	Rushford	Republican
Perry, B. F.	12	Rochester	Republican
Pope, Isaac	08	Morristown	Republican
Randall, J. K.	12	Eyota	Republican
Reed, John A.	17	Sterling	Republican
Rice, Edmund	01	Saint Paul	Democratic
Richardson, Nathan	03	Little Falls	Republican
Savage, P. W.	06	Glencoe	Republican
Sawyer, Caleb	12	Elgin	Republican
Seboski, John	05	Dayton	Republican
Shillock, Daniel G.	19	New Ulm	Republican
Smith, Andrew C.	11	Stockton	Republican
Smith, James E.	16	Albert Lea	Republican
Twiford, Willis H.	16	Owatonna	Republican
Wheaton, Sr., Charles Augustus	08	Northfield	Republican
Wilson, R. B.	09	Northfield	Republican
Yates, Bowne	17	Madelia	Republican

== Membership changes ==
=== House of Representatives ===
District	Vacated by	Reason for change	Successor	Date successor seated
03	Henry Hoepner (?)	Although Hoepner was initially seated when the session began, the seat was contested by Richardson. On January 18, 1867 the House determined that Richardson was entitled to the seat.	Nathan Richardson (R)	January 18, 1867

Preceded by Eighth Minnesota Legislature	Ninth Minnesota Legislature; 1867	Succeeded by Tenth Minnesota Legislature
