= 8th Minnesota Legislature =

1866 legislative session

Eighth Minnesota Legislature
←	7th Minnesota Legislature	9th Minnesota Legislature	→
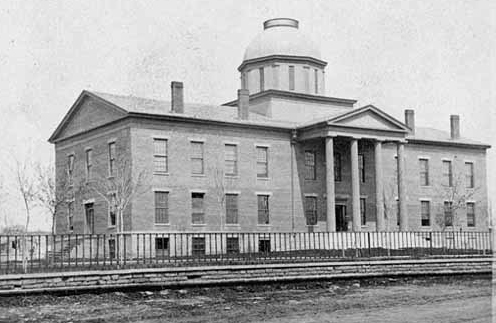

Overview
- Legislative body: Minnesota Legislature
- Jurisdiction: Minnesota, United States
- Term: January 1, 1866 – January 7, 1867
- Website: www.leg.state.mn.us

Minnesota State Senate
- Members: 21 Senators
- Lieutenant Governor: Thomas Henry Armstrong
- Party control: Republican Party

Minnesota House of Representatives
- Members: 42 Representatives
- Speaker: James Beach Wakefield
- Party control: Republican Party

The eighth Minnesota Legislature first convened on January 2, 1866. The half of the 21 members of the Minnesota Senate who represented even-numbered districts were elected during the general election of November 8, 1864, while the 42 members of the Minnesota House of Representatives and the other half of the members of the Minnesota Senate were elected during the general election of November 7, 1865.

== Sessions ==
The legislature met in a regular session from January 2, 1866, to March 2, 1866. There were no special sessions of the 8th Minnesota Legislature.

== Party summary ==
=== Senate ===
	Party (Shading indicates majority caucus)		Total	Vacant
	Democratic	Republican	Total	Vacant
End of previous Legislature	4	17	21	0
Begin	6	15	21	0
Latest voting share	29%	71%		
Beginning of the next Legislature	5	17	22	0

=== House of Representatives ===
	Party (Shading indicates majority caucus)			Total	Vacant
	Democratic	Republican	Unknown	Total	Vacant
End of previous Legislature	10	32	0	42	0
Begin	13	29	0	42	0
Latest voting share	31%	69%	0%		
Beginning of the next Legislature	7	39	1	47	0

== Leadership ==
=== Senate ===
Lieutenant Governor
Thomas Henry Armstrong (R-High Forest)

=== House of Representatives ===
Speaker of the House
James Beach Wakefield (R-Blue Earth City)

== Members ==
=== Senate ===
Name	District	City	Party
Baxter, Luther Loren	18	Shakopee	Democratic
Brown, Charles T.	19	Saint Peter	Republican
Buell, David L.	13	Caledonia	Democratic
Butters, Reuben	17	Kasota	Democratic
Cole, Gordon E.	08	Faribault	Republican
Daniels, John V.	12	Rochester	Republican
George, G. D.	06	Rockford	Republican
Langley, Dudley F.	07	Hastings	Republican
Lord, Samuel	15	Mantorville	Republican
Lowell, Benjamin A.	16	Wilton	Republican
McKusick, John	02	Stillwater	Republican
Miller, Luke	14	Chatfield	Republican
Murray, William Pitt	01	Saint Paul	Democratic
Otis, George Lamartine	02	Saint Paul	Democratic
Pettit, Curtis Hussey	05	Minneapolis	Republican
Pillsbury, John Sargent	04	Saint Anthony	Republican
Randolph, N. F.	10	Lake City	Republican
Richardson, Reuben M.	03	Torah	Democratic
Shillock, Daniel G.	20	New Ulm	Republican
Simpson, Thomas	11	Winona	Republican
Thacher, Joseph A.	09	Zumbrota	Republican

=== House of Representatives ===
Name	District	City	Party
Archibald, J. S.	08	Dundas	Unknown
Armstrong, Augustus L.	16	Albert Lea	Republican
Barnes, Nathan F.	03	Saint Cloud	Unknown
Branch, William	01	Saint Paul	Republican
Bristol, Warren Henry	09	Red Wing	Republican
Brown, William	10	Elgin	Unknown
Buck, Daniel	17	Mankato	Democratic
Buck, W. W.	11	Sherwood	Republican
Chalfant, William	14	Carimona	Republican
Crooker, Josiah B.	16	Owatonna	Republican
Cutter, E. W.	04	Saint Anthony	Unknown
Dickey, Sylvester	09	Pine Island	Unknown
Ellison, Smith	02	Sunrise	Unknown
Farmer, John Quincy	14	Spring Valley	Republican
Felch, Charles J.	15	Hamilton	Republican
Gould, Aaron	05	Eden Prairie	Republican
Griggs, Chauncey Wright	06	Chaska	Democratic
Harrington, Lewis	06	Hutchinson	Republican
Hathaway, Roderic D.	12	Pleasant Grove	Republican
Hayden, A. R.	04	Elk River	Unknown
Hobart, John	14	Lenora	Republican
Honner, J. S.G.	19	Redwood Falls	Republican
Howe, Jonas H.	05	South Plymouth	Republican
Jay, Stephen H.	18	Saint Lawrence	Republican
Johnson, Jr., D. B.	15	Austin	Republican
King, Dana E.	06	Greenleaf	Republican
Masters, Robert C.	07	Waterford	Democratic
Maynard, Arba K.	17	Elysian	Democratic
Mitchell, John B. H.	02	Stillwater	Republican
Moore, William S.	03	Saint Cloud	Democratic
Overbeck, Bernard	03	Saint Cloud	Unknown
Paine, Parker	01	Saint Paul	Unknown
Perry, B. F.	12	Rochester	Republican
Pope, Isaac	08	Morristown	Republican
Russell, Thomas	19	Henderson	Unknown
Schaller, J. P.	13	Brownsville	Republican
Smith, J. D.	07	West Saint Paul	Unknown
Thompson, James G.	17	Garden City	Unknown
Trott, Herman	21	Saint Paul	Unknown
Wakefield, James Beach	20	Blue Earth City	Republican
Watson, Robert	02	Cottage Grove	Republican
Youmans, Earl S.	11	Winona	Republican

Preceded by Seventh Minnesota Legislature	Eighth Minnesota Legislature; 1866	Succeeded by Ninth Minnesota Legislature
