= 11th Minnesota Legislature =

1869 legislative session

Eleventh Minnesota Legislature
| ← | 10th Minnesota Legislature | 12th Minnesota Legislature | → |
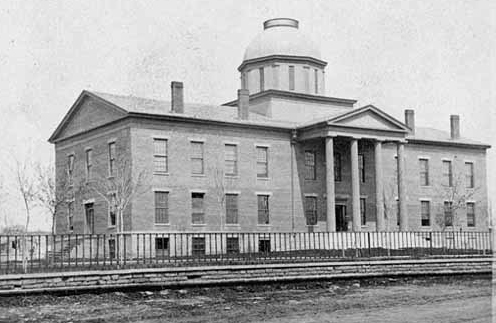

Overview
- Legislative body: Minnesota Legislature
- Jurisdiction: Minnesota, United States
- Term: January 5, 1869 – January 3, 1870
- Website: www.leg.state.mn.us

Minnesota State Senate
- Members: 22 Senators
- Lieutenant Governor: Thomas Henry Armstrong
- Party control: Republican Party

Minnesota House of Representatives
- Members: 47 Representatives
- Speaker: Chester D. Davidson
- Party control: Republican Party

The eleventh Minnesota Legislature first convened on January 5, 1869. The 11 members of the Minnesota Senate who represented odd-numbered districts were chosen in the General Election of November 5, 1867, while the 11 members of the Minnesota Senate who represented even-numbered districts, and the 47 members of the Minnesota House of Representatives, were chosen in the General Election of November 3, 1868.

== Sessions ==
The legislature met in a regular session from January 5, 1869 to March 5, 1869. There were no special sessions of the 11th Minnesota Legislature.

== Party summary ==
=== Senate ===
| | Party (Shading indicates majority caucus) | | Total | Vacant |
| | Democratic | Republican | Total | Vacant |
|---|---|---|---|---|
| End of previous Legislature | 5 | 16 | 21 | 1 |
| Begin | 6 | 16 | 22 | 0 |
| Latest voting share | 27% | 73% | | |
| Beginning of the next Legislature | 8 | 14 | 22 | 0 |

=== House of Representatives ===
| | Party (Shading indicates majority caucus) | | Total | Vacant |
| | Democratic | Republican | Total | Vacant |
|---|---|---|---|---|
| End of previous Legislature | 13 | 34 | 47 | 0 |
| Begin | 9 | 38 | 47 | 0 |
| Latest voting share | 19% | 81% | | |
| Beginning of the next Legislature | 18 | 29 | 47 | 0 |

== Leadership ==
=== Senate ===
Lieutenant Governor
Thomas Henry Armstrong (R-High Forest)

=== House of Representatives ===
Speaker of the House
Chester D. Davidson (R-Minneapolis)

== Members ==
=== Senate ===
| Name | District | City | Party |
|---|---|---|---|
| Batchelder, George Washington | 08 | Faribault | Republican |
| Becker, George Loomis | 01 | Saint Paul | Democratic |
| Bergen, A. | 14 | Preston | Republican |
| Bristol, Warren Henry | 09 | Red Wing | Republican |
| Brown, Charles T. | 19 | Saint Peter | Republican |
| Castle, James Nathan | 02 | Stillwater | Democratic |
| Crooker, Josiah B. | 16 | Owatonna | Republican |
| Freeman, Everett P. | 17 | Mankato | Republican |
| Gilman, Charles Andrew | 03 | Saint Cloud | Republican |
| Griggs, Chauncey Wright | 21 | Chaska | Democratic |
| Harris, William E. | 15 | Hamilton | Republican |
| Henry, William | 18 | Belle Plaine | Democratic |
| King, Dana E. | 06 | Greenleaf | Republican |
| Leonard, Joseph A. | 12 | Rochester | Republican |
| Lochren, William | 04 | Saint Anthony | Democratic |
| Pettit, Curtis Hussey | 05 | Minneapolis | Republican |
| Potter, George F. | 13 | La Crescent | Republican |
| Prindle, W. W. | 10 | Wabasha | Republican |
| Sheardown, Samuel B. (Note: Sheardown was chosen, in a special election held prior to the beginning of the session, to complete the unexpired term of Senator Benjamin Franklin, who died in office on a date uncertain, sometime after the session for the 10th Legislature adjourned. Sheardown was sworn in and took his seat at the beginning of the 11th Legislature.) | 11 | Stockton | Republican |
| Smith, Edson R. | 22 | Le Sueur | Republican |
| Smith, Seagrave | 07 | Hastings | Democratic |
| Wakefield, James Beach | 20 | Blue Earth City | Republican |

=== House of Representatives ===
| Name | District | City | Party |
|---|---|---|---|
| Aaker, Lars K. | 09 | Alexandria | Republican |
| Armstrong, Augustus L. | 16 | Albert Lea | Republican |
| Baxter, Luther Loren | 21 | Chaska | Democratic |
| Bohn, Conrad | 11 | Winona | Republican |
| Bryant, George W. | 10 | Elgin | Republican |
| Chewning, Reuben J. | 07 | Farmington | Democratic |
| Clark, Charles H. | 05 | Minneapolis | Republican |
| Davison, Chester D. | 05 | Minneapolis | Republican |
| Easton, Elijah | 16 | Owatonna | Republican |
| Egan, James J. | 01 | Saint Paul | Democratic |
| Everett, Ritten H. | 22 | Cleveland | Republican |
| Faber, Paul | 01 | Saint Paul | Democratic |
| Folsom, William Henry Carman | 02 | Taylors Falls | Republican |
| Fridley, Abram McCormick | 04 | Manomin | Democratic |
| Gilman, John M. | 01 | Saint Paul | Democratic |
| Grover, A. J. | 09 | Minneola | Republican |
| Hall, Albert R. | 05 | Dayton | Republican |
| Hammer, Evin D. | 14 | Pilot Mound | Republican |
| Haskell, Joseph | 02 | Afton | Republican |
| Hathaway, Roderic D. | 12 | Pleasant Grove | Republican |
| Hicks, William E. | 03 | Alexandria | Republican |
| Hobart, John | 14 | Rushford | Republican |
| Hollister, Edward | 08 | Warsaw | Republican |
| Hunt, Thomas J. | 15 | Ellington | Republican |
| Hunter, James W. | 20 | Jackson | Republican |
| Hyde, Sam Y. (Note: Legislators Past & Present notes that Hyde's middle initial is listed as V. in Toensing, but Y. in The Minnesota Legislative Manuals, 1869 and 1871. The Journal of the House of Representatives of the Eleventh Session of the Legislature of the State of Minnesota and the Journal of the House of Representatives of the Thirteenth Session of the Legislature of the State of Minnesota both list Hyde as "S. Y. Hyde", creating a presumption that Hyde's middle initial was Y.) | 11 | Saint Charles | Republican |
| Johnson, Tosten | 13 | Spring Grove | Republican |
| Larson, B. S. | 12 | Byron | Republican |
| Lathrop, John | 12 | Rochester | Republican |
| MacDonald, John Louis | 18 | Shakopee | Democratic |
| McGrew, James G. | 14 | Chatfield | Republican |
| Meighen, William | 14 | Forestville | Republican |
| Patterson, W. W. | 06 | Winsted | Republican |
| Pile, D. | 06 | Glencoe | Republican |
| Pitcher, Orin O. | 17 | Mankato | Republican |
| Proper, Erastus K. | 15 | Mantorville | Republican |
| Rhodes, W. C. | 17 | Madelia | Republican |
| Robbers, Ludwig | 03 | Saint Cloud | Democratic |
| Rudolph, John C. | 19 | New Ulm | Republican |
| Sibbison, W. J. | 08 | Northfield | Republican |
| Smith, L. (Note: Legislators Past & Present notes that Smith's first initial is listed as "L. (R.?)" in Toensing, and both L. and R. in The Minnesota Legislative Manual, 1869. However, the Journal of the House of Representatives of the Eleventh Session of the Legislature of the State of Minnesota lists Smith as "L. Smith", creating a presumption that his first initial was L.) | 07 | Hastings | Democratic |
| Smith, Warren | 16 | Wilton | Republican |
| Stoever, John C. | 19 | Henderson | Republican |
| Thompson, Isaac | 13 | Houston | Republican |
| Tibbitts, Abner | 10 | Lake City | Republican |
| Vale, J. Q. A. | 11 | Homer | Republican |
| Webster, Charles C. | 09 | Red Wing | Republican |

== Notes ==
| Preceded by Tenth Minnesota Legislature | Eleventh Minnesota Legislature; 1869 | Succeeded by Twelfth Minnesota Legislature |
