= 14th Minnesota Legislature =

1872 legislative session

The Fourteenth Minnesota Legislature first convened on January 2, 1872.

== Members ==
=== Senate ===
District	Name	Party	Residence	Counties represented
1	David L. Buell	Democratic	Caledonia	Houston
2	Thomas H. Everts	Republican	Rushford	Fillmore
3	John Quincy Farmer	Republican	Spring Valley	Fillmore
4	Sherman Page	Republican	Austin	Mower
5	Horatio D. Brown	Unknown	Albert Lea	Freeborn
6	Edward Harrison Hutchins	Republican	Winnebago City	Faribault
7	Samuel S. Beman	Republican	Saint Charles	Winona
8	William H. Stevens	Republican	Winona	Winona
9	Milo White	Republican	Chatfield	Olmsted
10	O. S. Porter	Republican	Rochester	Olmsted
11	Joseph H. Clark	Republican	Claremont	Dodge
12	Amos Coggswell	Democratic	Aurora	Steele
13	Reuben J. Chewning	Democratic	Farmington	Dakota
13	James E. Child	Unknown	Waseca	Waseca
14	John F. Meagher	Democratic	Mankato	Blue Earth
15	Hugh P. Wilson	Unknown	Plainview	Wabasha
16	Lucius Frederick Hubbard	Republican	Red Wing	Goodhue
17	Giles Slocum	Unknown	Cannon Falls	Goodhue
18	George Washington Batchelder	Democratic	Faribault	Rice
19	Luther Z. Rogers	Unknown	Waterville	Le Sueur
20	Levi Butler	Republican	Minneapolis	Hennepin
21	Robert H. Rose	Unknown	Belle Plaine	Scott
22	Dwight May Sabin	Republican	Stillwater	Washington
23	Isaac V.D. Heard	Unknown	Saint Paul	Ramsey
24	John Nicols	Republican	Saint Paul	Ramsey
25	Ashley C. Morrill	Unknown	Saint Anthony	Anoka, Hennepin, Isanti
27	William P. Ankeny	Unknown	Minneapolis	Hennepin
28	Jonas Lindall	Republican	Franconia	Aitkin, Chisago, Kanabec, Pine
29	William W. Billson	Unknown	Duluth	Carlton, Cass, Itasca, Lake, St. Louis
30	John O. Haven	Republican	Big Lake	Benton, Crow Wing, Mille Lacs, Morrison, Sherburne
31	Edwin M. Wright	Unknown	Saint Cloud	Stearns
32	G. A. Ruckoldt	Democratic	Rockford	Wright
33	Luther Loren Baxter	Democratic	Chaska	Carver
34	Marshall B. Stone	Republican	Saint Peter	Nicollet, Renville
35	Charles E. Cutts	Republican	Forest City	Meeker
36	Henry Poehler	Democratic	Henderson	McLeod, Sibley
37	William Pfaender Sr.	Republican	New Ulm	Brown, Lac qui Parle, Lyon, Redwood, Yellow Medicine
38	William D. Rice	Republican	Saint James	Cottonwood, Jackson, Martin, Murray, Nobles, Pipestone, Rock, Watonwan
39	Ole Peterson	Unknown	Glenwood	Big Stone, Grant, Pope, Stevens
40	Andrew Railson	Republican	Norway Lake	Chippewa, Kandiyohi, Swift
41	John O. Milne	Unknown	Sauk Centre	Becker, Beltrami, Clay, Otter Tail, Pembina (defunct), Polk, Todd, Traverse, Wadena, Wilkin

=== House of Representatives ===
Name	District	City	Counties represented	Party
Adams, Charles F. - "C.F., Chas. F."	26		Hennepin	Unknown
Adams, David A.	36		McLeod, Sibley	Unknown
Ayres, Ebeneezer	22		Washington	Unknown
Barto, Alphonso - "A."	31		Stearns	Unknown
Barton, Ara - "Asa"	18		Rice	Unknown
Berkey, Peter	23		Ramsey	Unknown
Berry, Edwin - "E."	38		Martin	Unknown
Blair, John L. - "J.L."	7		Winona	Unknown
Boss, Andrew	15		Wabasha	Unknown
Bothum, L.	2		Fillmore	Unknown
Bryant, George W.? - "Geo."	15		Wabasha	Unknown
Buck, Jr., Adam	36		Sibley	Unknown
Burbank, James C. - "J.C."	24		Ramsey	Unknown
Burchard, Henry M. - "H.M."	8		Winona	Unknown
Capwell, H. C.	14		Blue Earth	Unknown
Chadderdon, Joseph A. - "Jos., Jas., J."	21		Scott	Unknown
Chamberlain, George C. - "G.C."	38		Cottonwood, Jackson, Murray, Nobles, Pipestone, Rock	Unknown
Child, Simeon P. - "S.P."	6		Faribault	Unknown
Clark, Charles H. - "Chas., C.H."	26		Hennepin	Unknown
Cooley, Grove B. - "G.B."	11		Dodge	Unknown
Corey, Hampden A. - "H.A."	8		Winona	Unknown
Corliss, Eben E. - "E.E."	41		Becker, Beltrami, Clay, Otter Tail, Pembina (defunct), Polk, Todd, Traverse, Wadena, Wilkin	Unknown
Cravath, Llewellyn S. - "L.S."	41		Becker, Beltrami, Clay, Otter Tail, Pembina (defunct), Polk, Todd, Traverse, Wadena, Wilkin	Unknown
Curtis, Kelsey	13		Waseca	Unknown
Davis, F. B.	12		Steele	Unknown
Dayton, A. H.E. - "A.H.H."	2		Fillmore	Unknown
Demeules, Zephirin - "Zepheron, Z."	27		Hennepin	Unknown
Derham, Hugh	20		Dakota	Unknown
Dunham, J(ohn?) H. - "J.H."	34		Nicollet	Unknown
DuToit, Frederick E. - "F.E."	33		Carver	Unknown
Egleston, Marvin J. - "M.J., M.M."	3		Fillmore	Unknown
Eyre, Daniel E. - "Dan, D.E."	20		Dakota	Unknown
Fenton, Peter	9		Olmsted	Unknown
Finney, Jonathan	16		Goodhue	Unknown
Fletcher, Loren	26		Hennepin	Unknown
Foster, Henry	14		Blue Earth	Unknown
Gaskill, Arthur H. - "A.H."	9		Olmsted	Unknown
Gaskill, James R. M.	22		Washington	Unknown
Gillick, Lawrence	36		McLeod, Sibley	Unknown
Gray, William A. - "W.A."	20		Dakota	Unknown
Greely, Martin F.	31		Stearns	Unknown
Greenleaf, William Henry - "W.H., Wm. H., Wm. B."	35		Meeker	Unknown
Hall, Albert R. - "A.R."	27		Hennepin	Unknown
Hall, L. R.	1		Houston	Unknown
Hall, Liberty	36		McLeod, Sibley	Unknown
Hanson, Hans Christian	34		Nicollet	Unknown
Heminway, D.	7		Winona	Unknown
Holding, Randolph	31		Stearns	Unknown
Huntington, Henry M.	6		Faribault	Unknown
Hutchinson, John F. - "J.F."	18		Rice	Unknown
Jackson, C. B.	32		Wright	Unknown
Johnson, Charles - "Chas."	33		Carver	Unknown
Jones, Richard A. - "R.A."	10		Olmsted	Unknown
Kellett, Thomas Pearson - "T.P."	17		Goodhue	Unknown
Keysor, Clark	14		Blue Earth	Unknown
Kitchel, James L. - "J.L."	40		Chippewa, Kandiyohi, Swift	Unknown
Lafond, F. X.	32		Wright	Unknown
Langley, Dudley F. - "D.F."	20		Dakota	Unknown
Larson, John	2		Fillmore	Unknown
Lienau, Charles H. - "C.H."	33		Carver	Unknown
Lindsay, Thomas B. - "T.B."	10		Olmsted	Unknown
Matteson, H. M.	18		Rice	Unknown
McCracken, Peter	3		Fillmore	Unknown
Millard, George S. - "Geo. S."	19		Le Sueur	Unknown
Morse, Frank L. - "F.L."	27		Hennepin	Unknown
Munch, Adolph	28		Aitkin, Chisago, Kanabec, Pine	Unknown
Murdock, Hollis R. - "H.R."	22		Washington	Unknown
Murphy, W. W.	38		Watonwan	Unknown
Nash, Edgar	29		Carlton, Cass, Itasca, Lake, St. Louis	Unknown
Norsving, G. K.	17		Goodhue	Unknown
Osmundson, Osmund	18		Rice	Unknown
Pierce, Joshua C. - "J.C."	16		Goodhue	Unknown
Platt, Henry	18		Rice	Unknown
Quinn, Martin	21		Scott	Unknown
Reishus, Olav Sondresen - "O.S., Ole S., A.S."	37		Lac qui Parle, Lyon, Redwood, Yellow Medicine	Unknown
Rice, Edmund	24		Ramsey	Unknown
Richardson, Nathan - "Nate"	30		Benton, Crow Wing, Mille Lacs, Morrison, Sherburne	Unknown
Rockwell, G. W.	39		Big Stone, Grant, Pope, Stevens	Unknown
Rodgers, E. D.	5		Freeborn	Unknown
Rosenberger, John M. - "J.M."	31		Stearns	Unknown
Rosendahl, Paul H. - "P.H., P.N."	1		Houston	Unknown
Sanborn, John Benjamin - "Jno., J.B."	23		Ramsey	Unknown
Shelby, Charles H. - "Chas. H."	14		Blue Earth	Unknown
Smith, John H. - "J.H."	1		Houston	Unknown
Smyth, Henry M. - "H.M."	24		Ramsey	Unknown
Stanton, John	17		Goodhue	Unknown
Strong, John H. - "J.H."	25		Anoka, Hennepin, Isanti	Unknown
Thompson, James A. - "J.A."	15		Wabasha	Unknown
Thompson, John	13		Waseca	Unknown
Trow, A. H. - "A.A."	3		Fillmore	Unknown
Underwood, A. J.	26		Hennepin	Unknown
Van Dyke, John	15		Wabasha	Unknown
Van Hoesen, Francis Bennett - "F.B."	39		Douglas	Unknown
Wadsworth, H. E.	34		Renville	Unknown
Wait, Asa	19		Le Sueur	Unknown
Weber, William F. - "W.F."	1		Houston	Unknown
Wellman, A. L.	11		Dodge	Unknown
Wells, George A. - "Geo. A."	20		Dakota	Unknown
Weyhe, Henry	37		Brown	Unknown
Whipple, William J. - "Wm. J."	8		Winona	Unknown
Whitney, Franklin	25		Anoka, Hennepin, Isanti	Unknown
Wilkins, W. W.	12		Steele	Unknown
Williams, John T. - "J.T."	4		Mower	Unknown
Wilson, Perry	19		Le Sueur	Unknown
Wilson, William - "Wm."	5		Freeborn	Unknown
Wiswell, James A. - "J.A."	14		Blue Earth	Unknown
Wyckoff, J. M.	4		Mower	Unknown
