= 10th Minnesota Legislature =

1868 legislative session

Tenth Minnesota Legislature
←	9th Minnesota Legislature	11th Minnesota Legislature	→
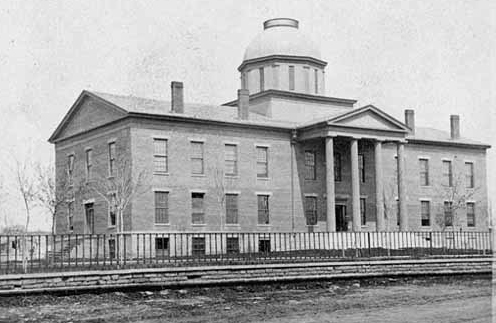

Overview
- Legislative body: Minnesota Legislature
- Jurisdiction: Minnesota, United States
- Term: January 7, 1868 – January 4, 1869
- Website: www.leg.state.mn.us

Minnesota State Senate
- Members: 22 Senators
- Lieutenant Governor: Thomas Henry Armstrong
- Party control: Republican Party

Minnesota House of Representatives
- Members: 47 Representatives
- Speaker: John Q. Farmer
- Party control: Republican Party

The 10th Minnesota Legislature first convened on January 7, 1868. The 11 members of the Minnesota Senate who represented even-numbered districts were chosen in the general election of November 6, 1866, while the 11 members of the Minnesota Senate who represented odd-numbered districts, and the 47 members of the Minnesota House of Representatives, were chosen in the general election of November 5, 1867.

== Sessions ==
The legislature met in a regular session from January 7, 1868 to March 6, 1868. There were no special sessions of the 10th Minnesota Legislature.

== Party summary ==
=== Senate ===
	Party (Shading indicates majority caucus)		Total	Vacant
	Democratic	Republican	Total	Vacant
End of previous Legislature	5	17	22	0
Begin	7	15	22	0
February 7, 1868	6	16	22	0
December 31, 1868	5	16	21	1
Latest voting share	24%	76%		
Beginning of the next Legislature	6	16	22	0

=== House of Representatives ===
	Party (Shading indicates majority caucus)		Total	Vacant
	Democratic	Republican	Total	Vacant
End of previous Legislature	7	40	47	0
Begin	13	34	47	0
Latest voting share	28%	72%		
Beginning of the next Legislature	9	38	47	0

== Leadership ==
=== Senate ===
Lieutenant Governor
Thomas Henry Armstrong (R-High Forest)

=== House of Representatives ===
Speaker of the House
John Q. Farmer (R-Spring Valley)

== Members ==
=== Senate ===
Name	District	City	Party
Armstrong, Augustus L.	16	Albert Lea	Republican
Armstrong, J. L.	10	Lake City	Republican
Baxter, Luther Loren	18	Shakopee	Democratic
Becker, George Loomis	01	Saint Paul	Democratic
Bristol, Warren Henry	09	Red Wing	Republican
Brown, Charles T.	19	Saint Peter	Republican
Buell, David L.	13	Caledonia	Democratic
Butters, Reuben	22	Kasota	Democratic
Daniels, John V.	12	Rochester	Republican
Folsom, William Henry Carman	02	Taylors Falls	Republican
Franklin, Benjamin	11	Winona	Democratic
Freeman, Everett P.	17	Mankato	Republican
Gilman, Charles Andrew	03	Saint Cloud	Republican
Gordon, Hanford Lennox	06	Monticello	Republican
Griggs, Chauncey Wright	21	Chaska	Democratic
Harris, William E.	15	Hamilton	Republican
Miller, Luke	14	Chatfield	Republican
Perkins, Oscar F.	08	Faribault	Republican
Pettit, Curtis Hussey	05	Minneapolis	Republican
Pillsbury, John Sargent	04	Saint Anthony	Republican
Potter, George F.	13	La Crescent	Republican
Smith, Seagrave	07	Hastings	Democratic
Wakefield, James Beach	20	Blue Earth City	Republican

=== House of Representatives ===
Name	District	City	Party
Ames, Jesse	08	Northfield	Republican
Ball, John	11	Winona	Democratic
Braden, William W.	14	Lenora	Republican
Bryant, George W.	10	Elgin	Republican
Buck, Jr., Adam	19	Henderson	Republican
Chewning, Reuben J.	07	Farmington	Democratic
Clark, Charles H.	05	Minneapolis	Republican
Colton, A. B.	20	Winnebago City	Republican
Comstock, E. G.	09	Ayr	Republican
Davison, Chester D.	05	Minneapolis	Republican
Doyle, Dennis	22	Kilkenny	Democratic
Dresbach, George B.	11	Dresbach	Democratic
Eaton, Samuel W.	12	Rochester	Republican
Erb, Christian	08	Cannon City	Republican
Farmer, John Quincy	14	Spring Valley	Republican
Finseth, Knut K.	09	Kenyon	Republican
Foster, Robert	07	Pine Bend	Democratic
Furber, Joseph Warren	02	Cottage Grove	Republican
Harrington, Lewis	06	Hutchinson	Republican
Hechtman, John H.	05	Osseo	Republican
Henry, William	18	Belle Plaine	Democratic
Hill, H. W.	11	Saint Charles	Democratic
Jones, DeWitt C.	01	Saint Paul	Democratic
Kinyon, William Ryan	16	Owatonna	Republican
LaDow, George A.	16	Wilton	Democratic
Lewis, Isaac I.	21	Watertown	Democratic
Lienau, Charles H.	01	Saint Paul	Democratic
Lowell, William	02	Marine	Republican
Meighen, William	14	Forestville	Republican
Miner, Nelson H.	03	Sauk Centre	Democratic
Murray, William Pitt	01	Saint Paul	Democratic
Pettijohn, J. G.D.	03	Glenwood	Republican
Pingrey, J. F.	09	Red Wing	Republican
Pitcher, Orin O.	17	Mankato	Republican
Proper, Erastus K.	15	Mantorville	Republican
Reed, John A.	17	Sterling	Republican
Ross, Samuel	04	Princeton	Republican
Rudolph, John C.	19	New Ulm	Republican
Salisbury, Jonathan Burnett	06	Kingston	Republican
Sawyer, Caleb	12	Elgin	Republican
Schaller, J. P.	13	Brownsville	Republican
Seeley, Francis W.	10	Lake City	Republican
Shaw, D. A.	15	Wasioja	Republican
Smith, James E.	16	Albert Lea	Republican
Stewart, Charles N.	12	Stewartville	Republican
Thompson, Isaac	13	Houston	Republican
Walker, Hiram	14	Rushford	Republican

== Membership changes ==
=== Senate ===
District	Vacated by	Reason for change	Successor	Date successor seated
13	David L. Buell (D)	Although Buell was initially seated when the session began, the seat was contested by Potter. On February 7, 1868, the Senate determined that Potter was entitled to the seat.	George F. Potter (R)	February 7, 1868
11	Benjamin Franklin (D)	Died in office on a date uncertain, sometime during 1868.	Remained vacant until next legislature	

Preceded by Ninth Minnesota Legislature	Tenth Minnesota Legislature; 1868	Succeeded by Eleventh Minnesota Legislature
