= Senator Pettit (disambiguation) =

John Pettit (1807–1877) was a U.S. Senator from Indiana from 1853 to 1855. Senator Pettit may also refer to:

- Curtis H. Pettit (1833–1914), Minnesota State Senate
- Milton Pettit (1835–1873), Wisconsin State Senate
