= John Merriam =

John Merriam may refer to:

- John Campbell Merriam (1869–1945), American paleontologist
- John L. Merriam (1825–1895), Minnesota banker and politician
