= Chester D. Davidson =

American politician (1826–1870)

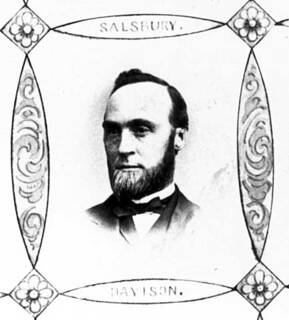
- Davidson c. 1868 by Joel Emmons Whitney

10th Speaker of the Minnesota House of Representatives
- In office January 5, 1869 – January 3, 1870
- Preceded by: John Q. Farmer
- Succeeded by: John L. Merriam

Member of the Minnesota House of Representatives from the 5th District
- In office January 7, 1868 – January 3, 1870

Personal details
- Born: 1826 Lyme, New Hampshire, U.S.
- Died: 1870 (aged 43–44) Ottertail, Minnesota, U.S.
- Party: Republican
- Profession: Merchant, surveyor

Chester D. Davidson (1826 – 1870), sometimes spelled as Chester D. Davison, was an American businessman, surveyor, and politician who served as the tenth Speaker of the Minnesota House of Representatives.

== Early life ==
Davidson was born in 1826 in Lyme, New Hampshire. Davidson moved to Minnesota Territory in 1856 and settled in Minneapolis where he worked as a merchant in the mercantile trade.

== Political career ==
Davidson was first elected to the Minnesota House of Representatives on November 5, 1867 to represent Minnesota's 5th House district (Hennepin County). Davidson served during the 10th Minnesota Legislature as a member of the printing committee and was the chairman of the railroads committee.

Davidson was reelected to serve in the Minnesota House on November 3, 1868 to serve in the same House district. Davidson served during the 11th Minnesota Legislature as the Speaker of the Minnesota House.

== Later life and death ==
Following his term in the Minnesota House Davidson was appointed in 1869 as the surveyor general of the state of Minnesota. Davidson died of typhoid fever in late 1870 at the age of 44 while surveying land in Ottertail, Minnesota.

Political offices
Preceded by John Q. Farmer	Speaker of the Minnesota House of Representatives; 1869	Succeeded by John L. Merriam
