= Orin Densmore =

American businessman (1805–1872)

Orin Densmore Sr.
- Densmore c. 1863 by Joel Emmons Whitney

Member of the Minnesota House of Representatives from the 9th District
- In office January 4, 1870 – January 1, 1872
- Governor: Horace Austin

Personal details
- Born: September 22, 1805 Sullivan County, New Hampshire, U.S.
- Died: June 3, 1878 (aged 72) Red Wing, Minnesota, U.S.
- Resting place: Oakwood Cemetery; Red Wing, Minnesota, U.S.
- Relations: Frances Densmore (granddaughter)

Orin Densmore Sr. (September 22, 1805 – June 3, 1878), also spelled as Orrin Densmore, was an American businessman, farmer, teacher, and politician. Densmore served two consecutive terms in the Minnesota House of Representatives.

== Early life and career ==
Densmore was born in Sullivan County, New Hampshire on September 22, 1805.^{:757} Densmore's family moved to Riga, New York where Densmore began teaching in various schools at the age of sixteen.^{:757} While in New York Densmore worked as a farmer and silversmith.^{:757}

Densmore briefly lived in Emerald Grove, Wisconsin and worked in Janesville, Wisconsin in the lumber industry.^{:757} Densmore later moved to Minnesota Territory on May 8,1857 and settling in the city of Red Wing.^{:757} While in Red Wing Densmore worked for the Freeborn & Co. sawmill.^{:757}

== Political career ==
=== Local offices ===
Densmore served as the treasurer of Goodhue County, Minnesota, was Red Wing's judge of probate, and served as the city recorder for Red Wing.^{:757} Densmore was later appointed as the deputy collector for Goodhue County in 1867.^{:757}

=== Minnesota House ===
Densmore was elected on November 2, 1869 to serve in the Minnesota House of Representatives, representing Minnesota's 9th House district (Goodhue County). Densmore would serve during the 13th Minnesota Legislature. During his first term Densmore was a member of the printing and railroads committees and was the chairman of the education committee.

Densmore was reelected on November 8, 1870 to serve in the same position in the 14th Minnesota Legislature. During his second term Densmore was the chairman of education committee and was a member of the public buildings committee and the joint agricultural college lands and college committee.

== Later life ==
Following his second term in the Minnesota House, Densmore worked as a clerk for the Minnesota office of the superintendent of public instruction.^{:758} Densmore died on June 3, 1878.

== Personal life ==
Densmore was married to Elizabeth Fowle in 1828.^{:757} Densmore was the grandfather of Minnesota ethnographer and anthropologist Frances Densmore.
