= Myrton O. Wegener =

American businessman and politician

Member of the Minnesota Senate from the 12th district
- In office January 2, 1973 – January 3, 1981
- Preceded by: Rollin Glewwe
- Succeeded by: Don Anderson

Member of the Minnesota Senate from the 54th district
- In office January 5, 1971 – January 1, 1973
- Preceded by: Marvin W. Bursch
- Succeeded by: Edward J. Gearty (redistricted)

Personal details
- Born: November 7, 1917 Woodside Township, Minnesota
- Died: May 5, 1991 (aged 73) Bertha, Minnesota
- Party: DFL
- Education: University of Minnesota
- Profession: Chairman, Bertha Co-op Creamery

Myrton O. Wegener (November 7, 1917 – May 5, 1991) was an American businessman and politician.

Wegener was born in Woodside Township, Otter Tail County, Minnesota. He went to the Bertha, Todd County, Minnesota public schools and graduated from Bertha High School. Wegener served as mayor of Bertha, Minnesota. He was a farmer. Wegener was also involved with the creamery, real estate, farm equipment dealership, and used car dealership businesses. Wegerner served in the Minnesota Senate from 1971 to 1982 and was a Democrat. Wegener served on the Todd County Commission in 1991 and died while still in office. Wegener died from a heart attack at his home in Bertha, Minnesota.
