= James R.M. Gaskill =

American physician and politician (1820–1894)

- Ambrotype of Gaskill c. 1858

Inspector of Minnesota State Prisons
- In office 1868–1877

Member of the Minnesota House of Representatives from the 22nd District
- In office January 2, 1872 – January 5, 1874
- Preceded by: L. H. Bullis
- Succeeded by: Charles Eckdall, David B. Loomis, and J. A. McCluskey

Member of the Minnesota House of Representatives from the 1st District
- In office December 2, 1857 – December 6, 1859
- Preceded by: Position established
- Succeeded by: Andrew J. Van Vorhes, Orange Walker, and Daniel T. Watson

Personal details
- Born: James Riley Monroe Gaskill; May 18, 1820 Madison County, Illinois, U.S.
- Died: April 7, 1894 (aged 73) Danville, Illinois, U.S.
- Resting place: Lakewood Cemetery; Minneapolis, Minnesota, U.S.
- Education: McKendree College (1843); Missouri Medical College (1854)

Military service
- Allegiance: United States of America
- Branch/service: Union Army
- Years of service: 1864–1865
- Rank: Major (Surgeon)
- Unit: 45th Illinois Infantry Regiment
- Battles/wars: American Civil War

James Riley Monroe Gaskill (May 18, 1820 – April 7, 1894) was an American physician, businessman, politician, and early citizen of Marine on St. Croix, Minnesota who served three terms in the Minnesota House of Representatives.

== Early life and education ==
Gaskill was born in Madison County, Illinois on May 18, 1820.^{:481}^{:135} Gaskill graduated from McKendree College in 1843 before attending medical school at the Missouri Medical College, where he graduated in 1854.^{:481}^{:135} Gaskill practiced medicine in Centralia, Illinois before moving to Minnesota Territory in 1855 and settled in Marine on St. Croix.^{:481}^{:135}

== Career ==
While in Minnesota, Gaskill was involved in the milling and lumber industries, as well as the mercantile trade.^{:481} In 1855 Gaskill erected a flour mill at Marine which he operated. While in Marine, Gaskill was a business associate of the Judd, Walker & Company which operate the Marine Mill.^{:135} Gaskill worked in Marine until his military service in 1864, following his military service he worked as a bookkeeper and continued to practice medicine in Marine.^{:135} In his later years Gaskill moved to Stillwater, Minnesota where he worked as a prison inspector and continued his medical practice until his death.^{:135}

== Political career ==
Gaskill was elected to serve in the Minnesota House on October 13, 1857, representing Minnesota's 1st House district (Washington County) in the 1st Minnesota Legislature. During his first term Gaskill was a member of the state library committee.

Gaskill was reelected to the Minnesota House on November 11, 1871, to represent the 22nd House district in the 14th Minnesota Legislature. During his second term Gaskill was a member of the education, incorporations, and the Minnesota State Prison committees. Gaskill served a consecutive third term in the Minnesota House during the 15th Minnesota Legislature in 1873, representing the same House district. During his third term Gaskill was the chair of the incorporations committee and was a member of the education committee. Gaskill politically identified as a Republican during his third House term.

== Military service ==
During the American Civil War Gaskill joined the Union Army on May 6, 1864, and served as a surgeon in the 45th Illinois Infantry Regiment.^{:135} Gaskill was promoted to the rank of regimental surgeon (equivalent to the rank of Major) on June 22, 1865.

== Later life and death ==
Following his military service, Gaskill continued his medical practice, was a member of the Minnesota Medical Association, and was a trustee and inspector of the Minnesota State Prison from 1868 to 1877.^{:135} Gaskill was a member of the Muller Post No.1 of the Grand Army of the Republic. Muller post was the first GAR post in the state of Minnesota and was headquartered in Stillwater.

Gaskill died on April 7, 1894, in Danville, Illinois from arsenic poisoning.^{:135} Gaskill is buried in Lakewood Cemetery in Minneapolis.

== Personal life ==
Gaskill was married to Clara E. Hughes in 1861.^{:135}
