= Elijah Easton =

American politician

Elijah Easton (May 18, 1815 – February 27, 1905) was an American farmer, teacher and politician who served two one-year terms as a member of the Wisconsin State Assembly from Walworth, Wisconsin, and another as a member of the Minnesota House of Representatives from a three-county district, as well as holding local offices in both these states.

== Background ==
Easton was born on May 18, 1815, in Afton, New York, and was educated in the local common schools, In 1837, he moved to Potter County, Pennsylvania, where he engaged in teaching and farming. On February 22, 1839, he married Jerusha E. Nichols. In 1842, they moved to Walworth, where he built a home in the wilderness, and taught school during the winter months.

== Wisconsin public office ==
Easton was first elected to the Assembly as a Freesoiler for the 1851 session, having been elected over William P. Allen (a Whig) and Hyman H. Seaver (incumbent George Sykes (or Sikes), also a Freesoiler, was not a candidate). He was succeeded by Zerah Mead, a Whig.

In 1856 and 1857, he served as the chairman of the Town of Walworth's Board of Supervisors and thus was a member of the county's Board of Supervisors as well.

He was elected once more for the 1858 session, this time as a Republican.

== Later years ==
Easton shipped out of New York City to California in 1860 to prospect for gold, but met with no success and returned in 1862. He tried once more in 1863, going overland this time, and returned to Wisconsin once more in 1865 with many new experiences but no gold.

He moved to Dover Township, later renamed Havana at his suggestion, in Steele County, Minnesota in 1866, and for the third time created a new farm for himself in a pioneer region. In 1868, he was farming near Owatonna when he was elected as a Republican to a term from the 16th House district (Freeborn, Steele, and Waseca counties), succeeding William R. Kinyon, also a Republican from Owatonna. He was assigned to the standing committees on claims and on public lands; and to the joint committee on agricultural college lands and college, of which he was chairman. He was succeeded by H. W. Ruliffson, a Republican.

After the legislature adjourned, he was appointed postmaster for Owatonna, a position he held for six years. His wife died July 31, 1875. In 1877, he was elected city assessor, and would be re-elected for the next ten years.

He died on February 27, 1905, in Owatonna. He had six surviving children. Known locally as "Uncle Elijah", he was described in a contemporary account as a "venerable looking old gentleman... [w]ith his tall, erect form, stately bearing, long white hair and whiskers, and... kind and benevolent face." While he had been suffering from increasing feebleness, within the past year he had posed as a model at Pillsbury Academy, a local college preparatory school.

He and Jerusha are buried at Forest Hill Cemetery in Owatonna.
