= Caleb Sawyer =

American politician (1806–1881)

Member of the Minnesota House of Representatives from the 12th district
- In office January 8, 1867 – January 4, 1869 Serving with B. F. Perry (1867–1868), J. K. Randall (1867–1868), Samuel W. Eaton (1868–1869), Charles N. Stewart (1868–1869)

Personal details
- Born: October 9, 1806 New Hampshire, U.S.
- Died: March 14, 1881 (aged 74)
- Resting place: Elgin Cemetery, Wabasha County, Minnesota, U.S.
- Party: Republican
- Relatives: Dave Sawyer
- Profession: Politician, farmer

Caleb Sawyer (October 9, 1806 – March 14, 1881) was an American politician and farmer who served in the Minnesota House of Representatives from 1867 to 1869, representing the 12th legislative district of Minnesota as a Republican in the 9th and 10th Minnesota Legislatures.

== Early life ==
Sawyer was born in New Hampshire on October 9, 1806.

== Career ==
Sawyer served in the Minnesota House of Representatives from 1867 to 1869, representing the 12th legislative district of Minnesota as a Republican in the 9th and 10th Minnesota Legislatures.

During his time in office, Sawyer served on the following committees:

- Banks (1867)
- Public Buildings (1867)
- Insurance (1868)
- Joint Taxes and Tax Laws (1868)
- Public Lands (1868)

Sawyer served as chair of the Public Buildings and Public Lands committees.

Sawyer's time in office began on January 8, 1867, and concluded on January 4, 1869. His district included representation for Olmsted County.

Outside of the Minnesota Legislature, Sawyer was a farmer.

== Personal life and death ==
Sawyer came to Minnesota in 1856. He was married and resided in Elgin, Minnesota.

Sawyer died at the age of 74 on March 14, 1881. He was buried in Elgin Cemetery, located in Wabasha County, Minnesota.

Minnesota House of Representatives
Preceded by —	Member of the Minnesota House of Representatives from the 12th district 1867–1869; Served alongside: B. F. Perry (1867–1868), J. K. Randall (1867–1868), Samuel W. Eaton (1868–1869), Charles N. Stewart (1868–1869)	Succeeded by —
