= Rollin Glewwe =

American politician (1933–2020)

Minnesota State Senator for the 12th District
- In office January 3, 1967 – January 1, 1973
- Preceded by: Michael McGuire
- Succeeded by: Myrton Wegener

Personal details
- Born: Rollin Bert Glewwe; May 2, 1933 Saint Paul, Minnesota, U.S.
- Died: April 27, 2020 (aged 86) Saint Paul, Minnesota, U.S.
- Party: Conservative

Rollin Bert Glewwe (May 2, 1933 – April 27, 2020) was an American businessman and politician.

Glewwe was born in Saint Paul, Minnesota, on May 2, 1933. He lived in South St. Paul and went to the public schools. Glewwe went to University of Minnesota. He worked for Glewwe Food Markets in South St. Paul and was the department manager and advertising director. Glewwe served on the South St. Paul City Charter Commission. Glewwe served in the Minnesota Senate from 1967 to 1973, where he represented the 12th District as a Conservative. He died in Saint Paul, Minnesota, on April 27, 2020.
