= William W. Billson =

American politician

William W. Billson, also known as Bill Billson, (June 7, 1847 – September 2, 1923) was an American lawyer and politician.

Billson was born in Springfield, Illinois. He moved to Duluth, Minnesota in 1865 and practiced law in Duluth. Billson lived in Duluth with his wife and family. He served in the Minnesota Senate in 1872 and from 1883 to 1886. In 1879, he was a primary contender for Governor of Minnesota. He was defeated by incumbent John S. Pillsbury. Billson also served as the United States Attorney for the District of Minnesota from 1873 to 1882. He died in Long Beach, California.
