= George C. Chamberlain =

American politician

Member of the Minnesota House of Representatives from the 20th district
- In office 1871–unfinished
- Preceded by: Michael E.L. Shanks
- Succeeded by: A. L. Patchen

Member of the U.S. House of Representatives from 's 38th district
- In office 1872–1873
- Succeeded by: Stephen Miller

Personal details
- Born: February 24, 1837 Newbury, Vermont
- Died: November 1896 (aged 58–59) Bradford, Vermont
- Party: Republican
- Education: Newbury Seminary
- Occupation: Newspaper editor, Legislator

Military service
- Allegiance: United States (Union)
- Branch/service: United States Army; Union Army
- Years of service: 1863—1865
- Rank: First Lieutenant
- Unit: 9th Vermont Infantry

George C. Chamberlain (1837–1896) was a state representative, newspaper editor, and soldier from Jackson, Minnesota. He served a partial term in the 20th district of the Minnesota State House of Representatives and a full term in the 38th district.

== Personal life ==
Chamberlain was born in Newbury, Vermont on February 24, 1837. He moved from Vermont to Jackson, Minnesota in August 1866. He worked as the editor of the Jackson Republic when he was first elected. In 1881, he moved to Mankato where he became partial owner of the Mankato Free Press. Chamberlain was a Presbyterian and a member of the Freemasons. As he aged, Chamberlain became blind. He died in Bradford, Vermont in November 1896.

== Education ==
Chamberlain was formally educated at Newbury Seminary in Vermont. He also received vocational education in the "printer's trade".

== Career ==
=== State legislature ===
Chamberlain ran for election in the 20th district, representing Cottonwood, Faribault, Jackson, Martin, Murray, Pipestone, and Rock counties, in 1870. He won the election; however, it was contested by his opponent A. L. Patchen. He served a portion of the session; however, it was determined that there was gross election fraud and Patchen was given the seat. He was preceded in this position by Michael E. L. Shanks.

Chamberlain successfully ran for election in the 38th district in 1871. He served Cottonwood, Jackson, Murray, Nobles, Pipestone, and Rock counties from 1872 to 1873. He served on the Joint Apportionment and Public Lands committees and was the chair of the Joint Printing committee. He was succeeded in his house seat by Stephen Miller, former Governor of Minnesota.

=== Other government service ===
In addition to his work in the legislature, Chamberlain served in the military and in local government posts. He served as county attorney for Jackson County and later served as county auditor from 1863 to 1865. At the state level, he served on the Minnesota State Board of Equalization. He also served as Serjeant-at-Arms in the Minnesota State Senate in 1875. He served in the Jackson city government in 1882 and served as mayor in 1887.

== Military service ==
Chamberlain was a First lieutenant in the 9th Vermont Infantry of the Union Army. He was an acting adjutant in the American Civil War from 1863 to 1865.
