= Norway Lake, Minnesota =

Unincorporated community in Minnesota, United States

Norway Lake
- Unincorporated community
- Location within Minnesota Location within the United States
- Coordinates: 45°17′01″N 95°08′06″W
- Country: United States
- State: Minnesota
- County: Kandiyohi
- Township: Arctander
- Elevation: 1,214 ft (370 m)
- Time zone: UTC-6 (Central (CST))
  - Summer (DST): UTC-5 (CDT)
- Area code: 320
- GNIS feature ID: 654852

Norway Lake is an unincorporated community in Arctander Township, Kandiyohi County, Minnesota, United States.
