= Henry Chester Waite =

American lawyer (1830–1912)

Henry Chester Waite (June 30, 1830 – November 15, 1912) was an American lawyer, banker, and politician.

Waite was born in Rensselaerville, New York. He graduated from Union College in Schenectady, New York in 1851 and was admitted to the New York bar in 1853. Waite moved to St. Cloud, Minnesota in 1855 and continued to practiced law and was involved with the banking business. He served in the Minnesota Democratic Constitutional Convention of 1857. Waite served in the Minnesota House of Representatives in 1863 and in the Minnesota Senate in 1870 and 1871 and from 1883 to 1886. He served as the Register of the United States Land Office from 1865 to 1869. He died at his farm near St. Cloud, Minnesota. The city of Waite Park, Minnesota was named after him.
