= H. W. Ruliffson =

American farmer and legislator

H. W. Ruliffson (born 1834) was an American farmer and legislator.

Born in New York, Ruliffson moved to Minnesota Territory in 1857 and eventually settled in Russell, Minnesota where he farmed. He served in the Minnesota House of Representatives as a Republican in 1870 and from 1903 to 1904.
