= Lars K. Aaker =

American politician (1825–1895)

Captain Lars Knudsen Aaker
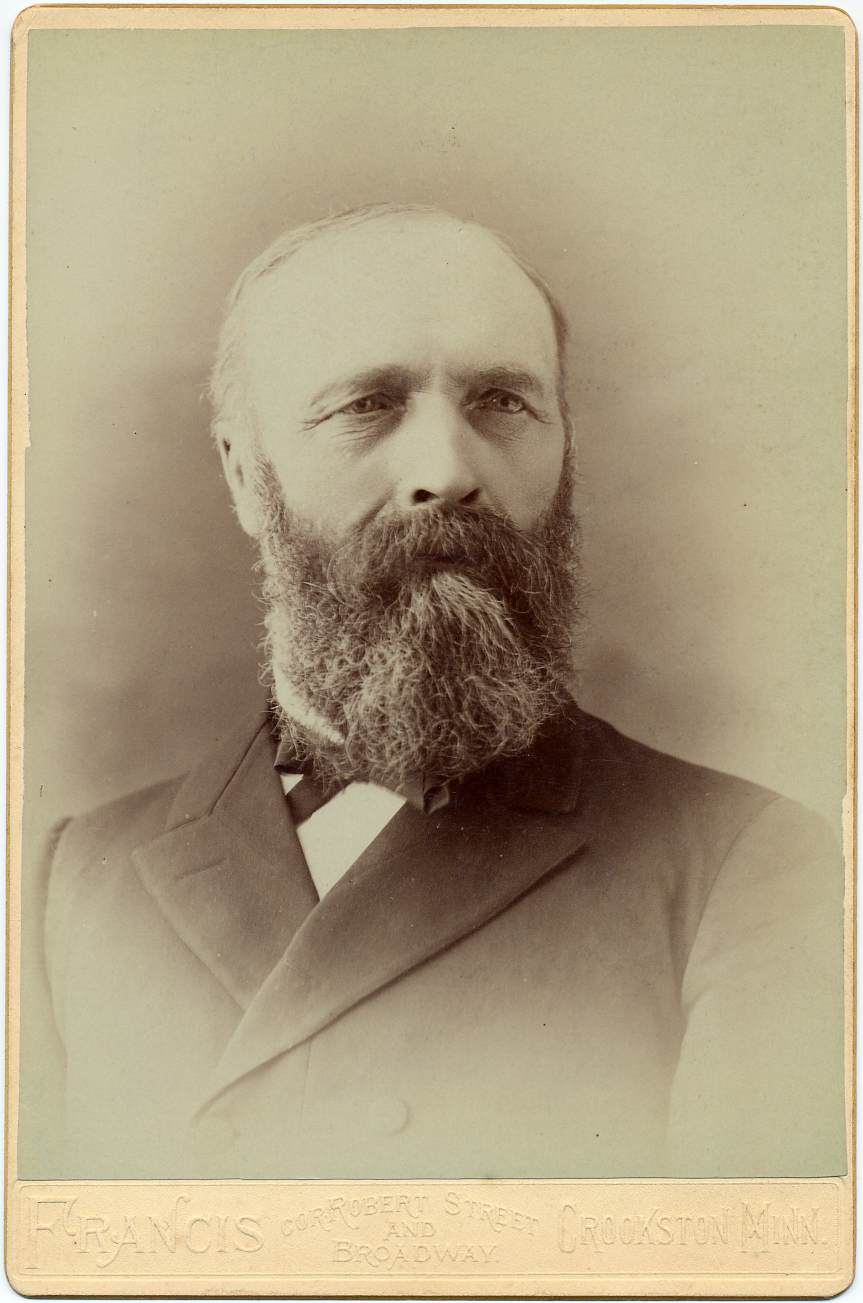
- Aaker in 1888

Member of the Minnesota Senate
- In office 1881–1882

Member of the Minnesota House of Representatives
- In office 1859–1860; 1862; 1867; 1869

Personal details
- Born: Lars Knudsen Aaker; September 19, 1825 Lårdal Municipality, Norway
- Died: August 14, 1895 (aged 69) Alexandria, Minnesota, U.S.
- Party: Republican

Military service
- Allegiance: United States of America
- Branch/service: Union Army
- Years of service: 1861-1862
- Rank: Captain
- Unit: Company D, 3rd Minnesota Infantry Regiment
- Battles/wars: American Civil War

Lars Knudsen Aaker (September 19, 1825 – August 14, 1895) was a Norwegian American farmer, politician, and American Civil War veteran who served in both chambers of the Minnesota Legislature.

== Early life ==
Born in Lårdal Municipality, Norway on September 19, 1825, Aaker was the son of Knut Saavesen Aaker and Mary L. Heggtvedt. Aaker attended the Teachers Seminary in Kviteseid where he graduated in 1845, that same year Aaker emigrated to the United States and lived at the Koshkonong Settlement near Lake Koshkonong in Dane County, Wisconsin Territory. In 1847, Aaker moved to Goodhue County, Minnesota Territory and then to Alexandria, Minnesota in 1870.

== Career ==
Aaker was a farmer and in the mercantile business. During the American Civil War, Aaker served as a Lieutenant in Company D of the 3rd Minnesota Volunteer Infantry Regiment under Captain Hans Mattson. Company D of the 3rd Minnesota was primarily recruited Goodhue County, Minnesota. The nickname of Company D was the "Scandinavian Guards" for the overwhelming amount of immigrants in the company from Norway and Sweden. Aaker served with the 3rd Minnesota until March 30, 1862 when he resigned his commission and was discharged from service.

In 1859–1860, 1862, 1867, and 1869, Aaker served in the Minnesota House of Representatives and as a Republican. In 1881 and 1882, Aaker served in the Minnesota Senate. Aaker worked in the United States General Land Office in Alexandria, Minnesota, from 1870 to 1876 and then in Crookston, Minnesota from 1883 to 1893.

== Death ==
Aaker died from a stroke at his home in Alexandria, Minnesota.

== Related reading ==
- Lovoll, Odd S. (2007) Norwegians on the Prairie: Ethnicity and the Development of the Country Town (Minnesota Historical Society) ISBN 9780873516037
