= John L. Merriam =

American politician

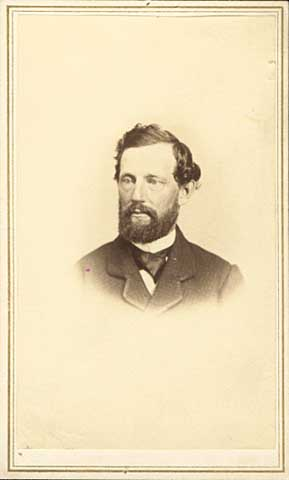
- Photograph of Merriam c. 1865 by Joel Emmons Whitney

11th Speaker of the Minnesota House of Representatives
- In office 1870–1871
- Preceded by: Chester D. Davidson
- Succeeded by: A.R. Hall

Minnesota State Representative from the 1st District
- In office 1870–1871

Personal details
- Born: John Lafayette Merriam; February 6, 1825 Essex, New York, U.S.
- Died: January 12, 1895 (aged 69)
- Party: Republican
- Profession: Banker

John Lafayette Merriam (February 6, 1825 – January 12, 1895) was a Minnesota banker, politician and Speaker of the Minnesota House of Representatives, representing St. Paul. He was instrumental in helping to organize First National Bank of Minnesota, and he served as vice president of Merchants National Bank.

Merriam was the son of Jane (Ismon) and William Strong Merriam. He began service in the Minnesota House of Representatives in 1870, and was elected speaker that year, serving in the position until 1871. His son, William R. Merriam, later served as speaker of the house in 1887, and was elected governor in 1888.

Political offices
| Preceded by Chester D. Davidson | Speaker of the Minnesota House of Representatives; 1870–1871 | Succeeded by A.R. Hall |
