= Albert Clark Wedge =

American physician and politician

Albert Clark Wedge (August 18, 1834 – October 23, 1911) was an American physician and politician.

Wedge was born in Denmark, Lewis County, New York. He went to the Wisconsin public schools and then went to Ripon College, in Ripon, Wisconsin, in 1854. In 1857, Wedge received his medical degree from Cleveland Medical College. He moved to Albert Lea, Minnesota with his wife and family and practiced medicine in Albert Lea. Wedge served in the 3rd Minnesota Infantry Regiment during the American Civil War. Wedge served as mayor of Albert Lea and was a Republican. He then served in the Minnesota House of Representatives in 1870 and 1971 and in the Minnesota Senate from 1879 to 1881.
