= Luke Miller (politician) =

American politician (1815–1881)

Luke Miller (August 18, 1815 – July 12, 1881) was an American medical doctor and politician.

Miller was born in Peterborough, New Hampshire. He graduated from University of Vermont in 1841 and then received his medical degree from Woodstock Medical College, Woodstock, Vermont, in 1844. He moved to Minnesota in 1851. Miller moved to Chatfield, Minnesota in 1857 and then moved to Lanesboro, Minnesota in 1859. He was a physician and served as the vice-president of the Minnesota Southern Railway. Miller served in the Minnesota Senate from 1862 to 1868 and was a Republican. Miller died in Lanesboro, Minnesota.
