= George Washington Batchelder =

American politician (1826–1910)

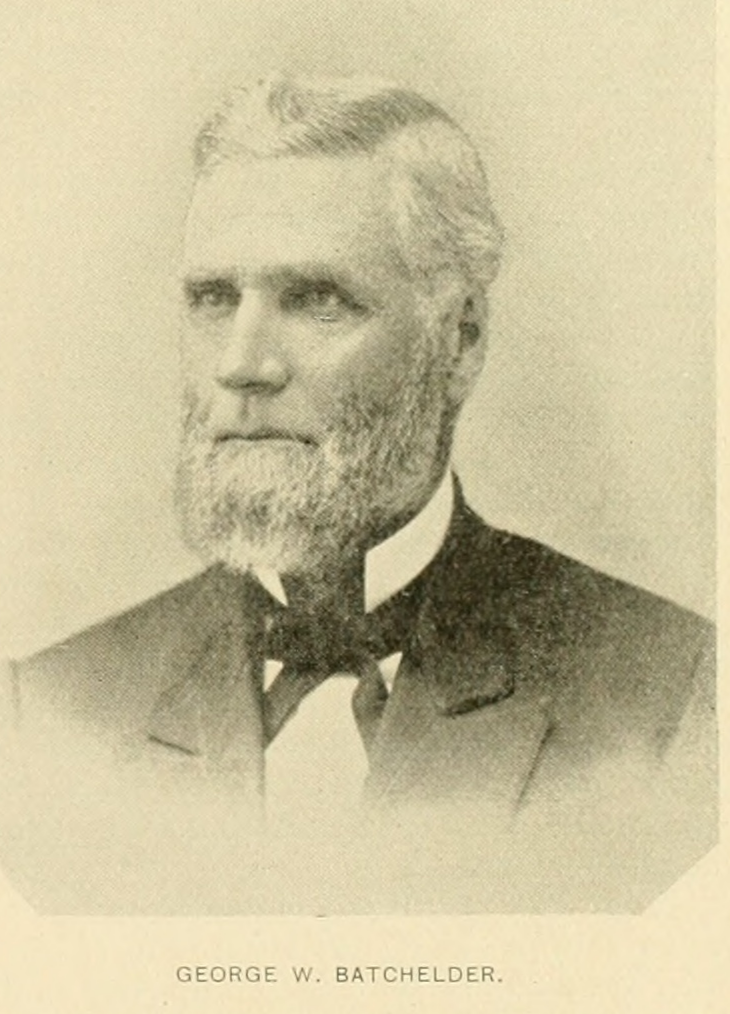

Member of the Minnesota Senate
- In office 1872–1874
- Constituency: 18th Senate district
- In office 1869–1871
- Constituency: 8th Senate district

Personal details
- Born: February 18, 1826 Danville, Vermont, U.S.
- Died: January 9, 1910 (aged 83) Faribault, Minnesota, U.S.
- Resting place: Oak Ridge Cemetery, Faribault, Minnesota
- Party: Democratic; Republican (before 1872)
- Spouse: Kate E. Davis (m. 1858–1910)
- Children: 5
- Education: University of Vermont
- Profession: Lawyer

George Washington Batchelder (February 18, 1826 – January 9, 1910) was an American lawyer and politician who served in the Minnesota Senate for several years from 1869 to 1874.

== Biography ==
Batchelder was born in Danville, Vermont to John and Alice Batchelder. He studied at the University of Vermont beginning in 1847. In 1851 he earned his A.B. degree and then proceeded to earn an A.M. degree. He was admitted to the bar in Tennessee in 1854, but he first practiced law in Janesville, Wisconsin. He arrived in Minnesota in 1855 and settled in Faribault, where he continued his legal practice. His partners in law included John M. Berry and Thomas S. Buckham.

Batchelder began his political career with unsuccessful candidacies for District Judge in 1865 and for United States Congress in 1867. Despite these failures, he was elected as a Republican in 1868 to the Minnesota Senate, where he served from January 5, 1869, to January 2, 1871. He served another term from January 5, 1872, to January 2, 1874, this time under the Democratic ticket. After his time in the state government, he became more involved in Faribault's municipal government, serving on the Board of Education from 1877 to 1892 and serving as mayor in 1880 and 1881.

He died in Faribault on January 9, 1910.

== Personal life and family ==
George W. Batchelder was the eldest of ten children born to John Batchelder (1777–1845) and his wife Alice "Elsie" (née Kitteridge; 1784–1879). John Batchelder was a farmer and carpenter in Danville, Vermont. The Batchelder family were descended from Reverend Stephen Bachiler, who arrived in the Massachusetts Bay Colony in 1632.

George Batchelder married Kate E. Davis on July 12, 1858, at Fond du Lac, Wisconsin. They had five children together, though one died in infancy and another died in childhood. Their elder son, Charles Spoor Batchelder, became a lawyer and practiced in partnership with his father, and served two terms as mayor of Faribault. Their younger son, John Davis Batchelder, was an academic and collector of rare books and manuscripts; he donated his collection to the Library of Congress.
