= Lenora, Minnesota =

Unincorporated community in Minnesota, United States

Lenora
- Unincorporated community
- Location within Minnesota Location within the United States
- Coordinates: 43°34′21″N 91°52′57″W
- Country: United States
- State: Minnesota
- County: Fillmore
- Elevation: 1,106 ft (337 m)
- Time zone: UTC-6 (Central (CST))
  - Summer (DST): UTC-5 (CDT)
- Area code: 507
- GNIS feature ID: 646598

Lenora is an unincorporated community in Fillmore County, in the U.S. state of Minnesota.

== History ==
Lenora was laid out in 1855. A post office was established at Lenora in 1856, and remained in operation until it was discontinued in 1905.

Historical population
Census	Pop.	Note	%±
1880	100		—
U.S. Decennial Census
