= Curtis H. Pettit =

American politician and businessman (1833–1914)

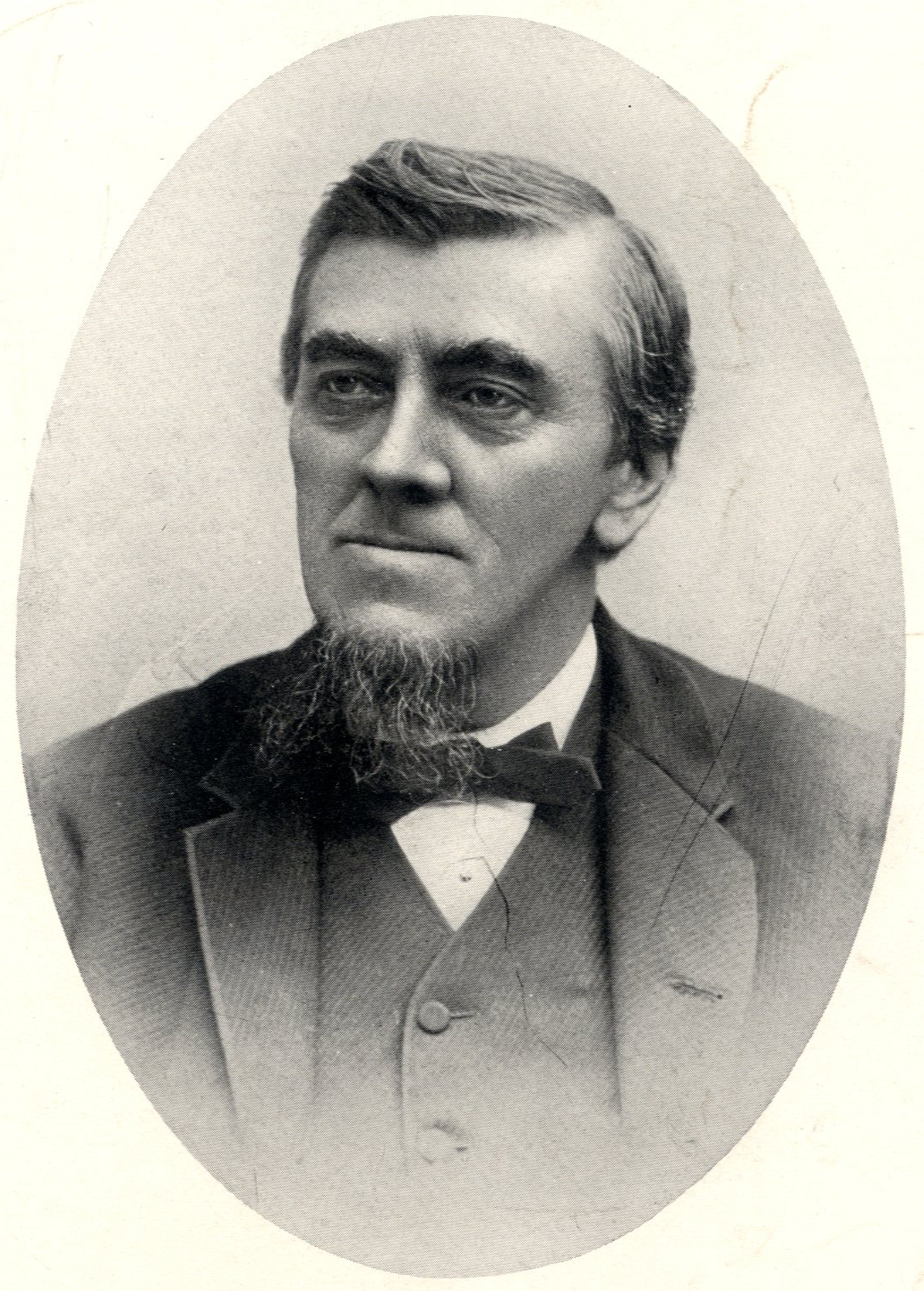
Portrait of Curtis Hussey Pettit, c. 1890s

Curtis Hussey Pettit (September 18, 1833 – May 11, 1914) was a pioneer Minneapolis banker, and a mill and elevator man. He was also involved in banking, real estate, lumber and hardware.

== Biography ==
Pettit was the son of Joseph Pettit and Hannah Grubb Hussey Pettit. He was born in Hanover/Hanoverton, Columbiana County, Ohio. Pettit attended a Friend's school at Sandy Springs, Ohio and attended the public schools of Hanoverton, Ohio. He attended Oberlin College, and was a bookkeeper in the Forest City Bank of Cleveland, Ohio.

== Career ==
Pettit moved to Pittsburgh, Pennsylvania, and was an employee of C. G. Hussey & Company, an early iron and steel firm. Later, Pettit moved to Galena, Illinois, on a prospecting tour in 1855. Pettit then came to Minnesota in 1855, and settled in Minneapolis.

Pettit initially opened a bank and real estate office on Bridge Square in Minneapolis. He developed the townsites of Glencoe, Hutchinson, and Watertown, Minnesota.

In 1856, Pettit was a partner with John G. Williams in the Minneapolis Journal in 1858, was a member of the Minneapolis City Council in 1859. Pettit sold his newspaper and banking interests by 1860 and established a retail hardware business, Williams Hardware Company. Withdrew from the firm in 1865 or 1866 and became a leading flour miller.

In 1861, Pettit was a lumberman and miller. He was a member of the firm of Ankeny, Robinson & Pettit, which operated a sawmill at Saint Anthony Falls.

Pettit formed the firm of Pettit, Robinson & Company and operated the Pettit Flour Mill. The mill was destroyed in the Great Mill Explosion of 1878.

Pettit also was a stockholder in and treasurer of the Minneapolis Elevator Company and was a builder of Elevator A.

He was a partner of Jabez M. Robinson in timberland development in St. Louis County, and Lake County, Minnesota.

He was a director of Soo Railroad and was considered an active factor in its building.

He was President of the Minneapolis Railway Terminal Company, and was a member for 32 years of the board of trustees of the Minnesota State Reform School/Minnesota State Training School for Boys and Girls.

Pettit was a member of the board of directors of the Minneapolis, St. Paul & Sault Ste. Marie Railroad and was a member of the board of trustees of the Westminster Presbyterian Church. He also became a life member of the Minnesota Historical Society in 1907.

== Politician ==
Pettit was a Republican and was a member of the Minnesota Senate representing Hennepin County (District 5) from 1869 until 1872. He was a member of the Minnesota House of Representatives representing Hennepin County (Districts 26 and 29) from 1873 until 1877 and from 1886 until 1889, where he sponsored liquor control legislation, was a member of the board of trustees of the Washburn A Mill "Mill Disaster Relief Fund of Minneapolis in 1878", He was the assignee of Norman B. Harwood of the bankrupt N. B. Harwood & Company.

In 1880, Pettit was a member of the Hennepin County, Fifth Congressional District and state central committees of the Republican Party.

== Personal life ==
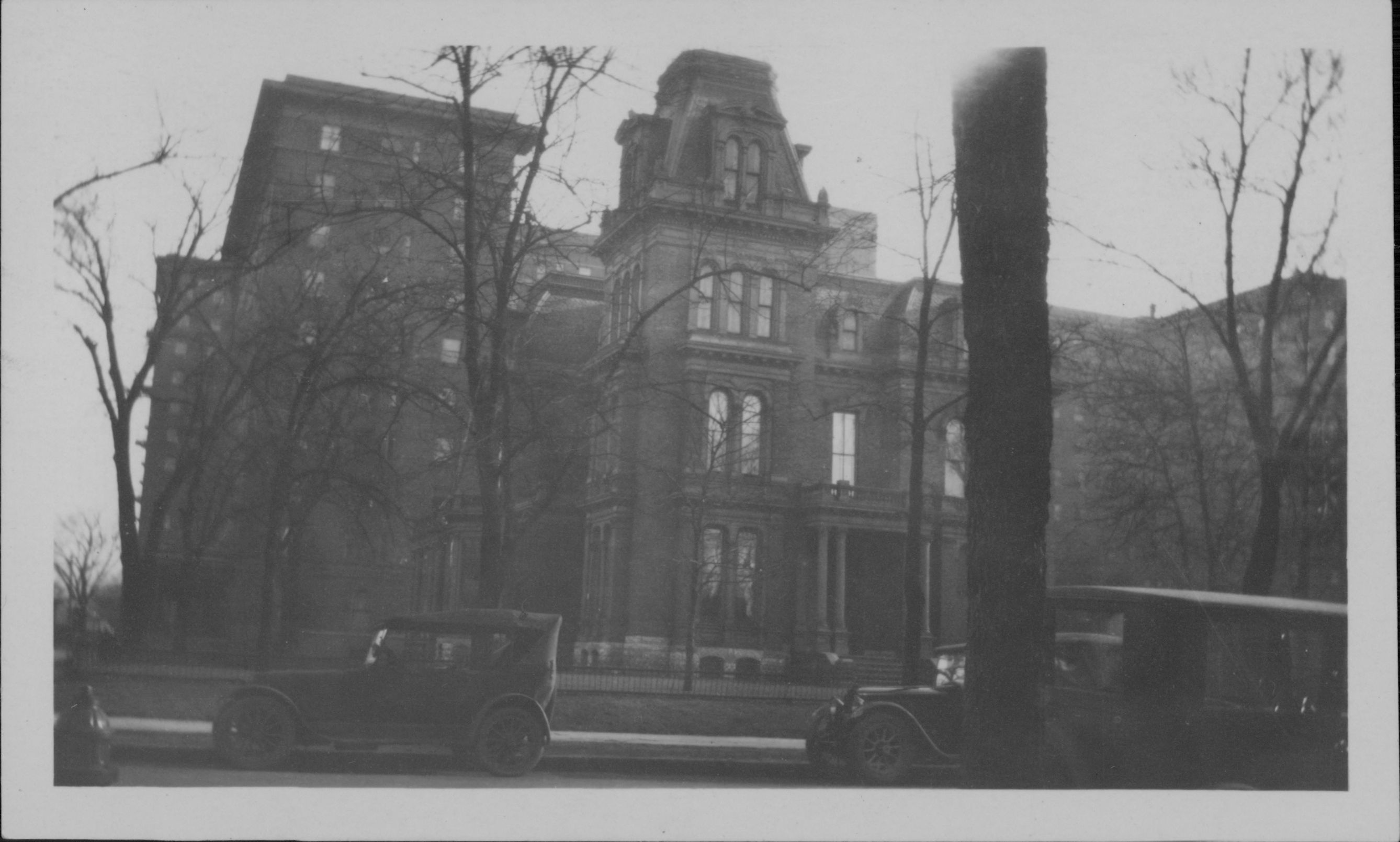
C. H. Pettit House

Pettit married Deborah McBride Williams, the daughter of Captain Louis Hudson Williams and Tabitha Patterson McKeehan Williams. Curtis H. Pettit and Deborah McBride Williams Pettit were the parents of five children.

== Death ==
Pettit died on May 11, 1914, at his home on Second Avenue in Minneapolis. He was buried in Lakewood Cemetery.
