= Augustus L. Armstrong =

American politician

Augustus L. Armstrong (March 29, 1833 – August 18, 1873) was an American lawyer and politician.

Armstrong was born in Milan, Ohio. He moved to Freeborn County, Minnesota in 1857. He lived in Albert Lea, Minnesota with his wife and family and was a lawyer. Armstrong served in the Minnesota House of Representatives in 1866 and 1869 and in the Minnesota Senate in 1867 and 1868. He then served in the United States Marshals Service for the District of Minnesota from 1869 to 1873. Armstrong died in Delavan, Wisconsin.
