= Blue Earth City Township, Faribault County, Minnesota =

Township in Minnesota, United States

Blue Earth City Township
- Township
- Location within the state of Minnesota Blue Earth City Township (the United States)
- Coordinates: 43°38′4″N 94°4′24″W
- Country: United States
- State: Minnesota
- County: Faribault

Area
  - Total: 32.9 sq mi (85.3 km^{2})
  - Land: 32.9 sq mi (85.3 km^{2})
  - Water: 0 sq mi (0.0 km^{2})
- Elevation: 1,093 ft (333 m)

Population (2000)
  - Total: 454
  - Density: 14/sq mi (5.3/km^{2})
- Time zone: UTC-6 (Central (CST))
  - Summer (DST): UTC-5 (CDT)
- ZIP code: 56013
- Area code: 507
- FIPS code: 27-06706
- GNIS feature ID: 0663625

Blue Earth City Township is a township in Faribault County, Minnesota, United States. The population was 454 at the 2000 census.

The township was organized in 1858 as Blue Earth Township.

== Geography ==
According to the United States Census Bureau, the township has a total area of 32.9 square miles (85 km^{2}), of which 32.9 square miles (85 km^{2}) is land and 0.04 square miles (0.10 km^{2}) (0.06%) is water.

== Demographics ==
As of the census of 2000, there were 454 people, 165 households, and 147 families residing in the township. The population density was 13.8 inhabitants per square mile (5.3/km^{2}). There were 173 housing units at an average density of 5.3 per square mile (2.0/km^{2}). The racial makeup of the township was 98.46% White, 1.32% from other races, and 0.22% from two or more races. Hispanic or Latino of any race were 1.98% of the population.

There were 165 households, out of which 33.3% had children under the age of 18 living with them, 82.4% were married couples living together, 3.0% had a female householder with no husband present, and 10.9% were non-families. 10.3% of all households were made up of individuals, and 5.5% had someone living alone who was 65 years of age or older. The average household size was 2.75 and the average family size was 2.88.

In the township the population was spread out, with 24.0% under the age of 18, 5.7% from 18 to 24, 24.2% from 25 to 44, 32.4% from 45 to 64, and 13.7% who were 65 years of age or older. The median age was 42 years. For every 100 females, there were 100.0 males. For every 100 females age 18 and over, there were 98.3 males.

The median income for a household in the township was $52,500, and the median income for a family was $53,750. Males had a median income of $38,000 versus $22,083 for females. The per capita income for the township was $21,517. About 4.5% of families and 5.4% of the population were below the poverty line, including 2.0% of those under age 18 and 12.5% of those age 65 or over.
