= Wilton, Minnesota =

City in Minnesota, United States

Wilton
- City
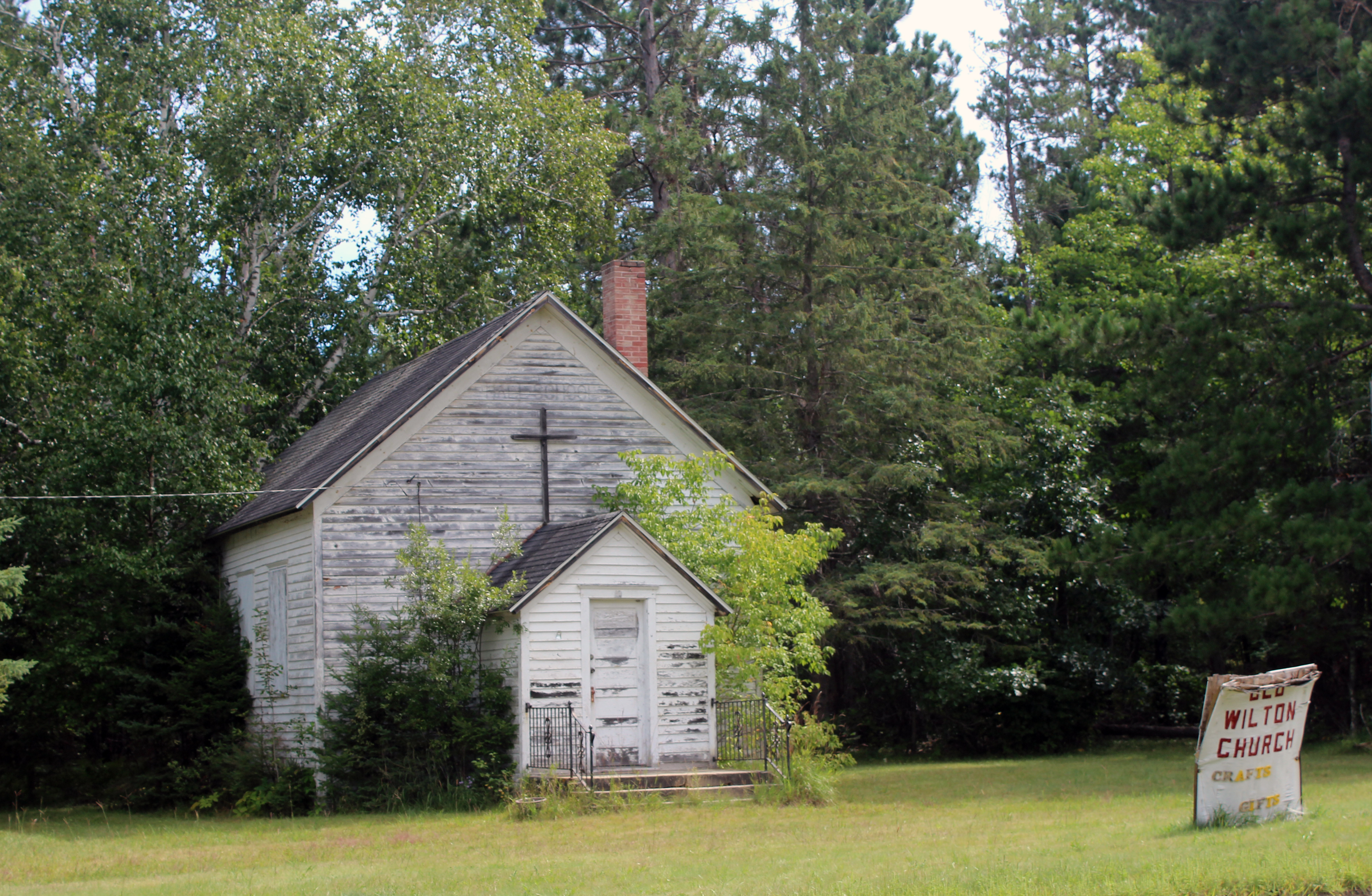
- Wilton Church

- Location of Wilton, Minnesota
- Coordinates: 47°30′22″N 94°59′46″W
- Country: United States
- State: Minnesota
- County: Beltrami

Area
  - Total: 2.88 sq mi (7.47 km^{2})
  - Land: 2.80 sq mi (7.24 km^{2})
  - Water: 0.089 sq mi (0.23 km^{2})
- Elevation: 1,391 ft (424 m)

Population (2020)
  - Total: 263
  - Density: 94.1/sq mi (36.32/km^{2})
- Time zone: UTC-6 (Central (CST))
  - Summer (DST): UTC-5 (CDT)
- ZIP codes: 56601, 56687
- Area code: 218
- FIPS code: 27-70708
- GNIS feature ID: 0654239

Wilton is a city in Beltrami County, Minnesota, United States. As of the 2020 census, Wilton had a population of 263. Wilton is considered a bedroom community of Bemidji.

== Geography ==
According to the United States Census Bureau, the city has a total area of 2.37 square miles (6.14 km^{2}), of which 2.32 square miles (6.01 km^{2}) is land and 0.05 square miles (0.13 km^{2}) is water.

== Demographics ==
Historical population
Census	Pop.	Note	%±
1880	87		—
1910	215		—
1920	176		−18.1%
1930	155		−11.9%
1940	139		−10.3%
1950	108		−22.3%
1960	112		3.7%
1970	119		6.3%
1980	176		47.9%
1990	171		−2.8%
2000	186		8.8%
2010	204		9.7%
2020	263		28.9%
U.S. Decennial Census

=== 2010 census ===
As of the census of 2010, there were 204 people, 78 households, and 55 families living in the city. The population density was 87.9 inhabitants per square mile (33.9/km^{2}). There were 87 housing units at an average density of 37.5 per square mile (14.5/km^{2}). The racial makeup of the city was 91.7% White, 1.5% Native American, 1.5% Asian, and 5.4% from two or more races. Hispanic or Latino of any race were 1.0% of the population.

There were 78 households, of which 38.5% had children under the age of 18 living with them, 51.3% were married couples living together, 14.1% had a female householder with no husband present, 5.1% had a male householder with no wife present, and 29.5% were non-families. 20.5% of all households were made up of individuals, and 7.7% had someone living alone who was 65 years of age or older. The average household size was 2.62 and the average family size was 3.02.

The median age in the city was 35.7 years. Residents under the age of 18 accounted for 24% of the city; 9.8% were between the ages of 18 and 24; 21.5% were from 25 to 44; 33.3% were from 45 to 64; and 11.3% were 65 years of age or older. The gender makeup of the city was 55.9% male and 44.1% female.

=== 2000 census ===
As of the census of 2000, there were 186 people, 73 households, and 54 families living in the city. The population density was 80.1 inhabitants per square mile (30.9/km^{2}). There were 80 housing units at an average density of 34.5 per square mile (13.3/km^{2}). The racial makeup of the city was 97.31% White, 1.08% Native American, and 1.61% from two or more races. Hispanic or Latino of any race were 1.61% of the population.

There were 73 households, out of which 37.0% had children under the age of 18 living with them, 53.4% were married couples living together, 12.3% had a female householder with no husband present, and 26.0% were non-families. 20.5% of all households were made up of individuals, and 8.2% had someone living alone who was 65 years of age or older. The average household size was 2.55 and the average family size was 2.91.

In the city, the population was spread out, with 28.5% under the age of 18, 8.1% from 18 to 24, 29.6% from 25 to 44, 22.6% from 45 to 64, and 11.3% who were 65 years of age or older. The median age was 36 years. For every 100 females, there were 111.4 males. For every 100 females age 18 and over, there were 95.6 males.

The median income for a household in the city was $33,750, and the median income for a family was $37,083. Males had a median income of $17,500 versus $20,750 for females. The per capita income for the city was $13,432. About 8.0% of families and 14.7% of the population were below the poverty line, including 26.5% of those under the age of eighteen and none of those 65 or over.
