= John Q. Farmer =

American politician (1823–1904)

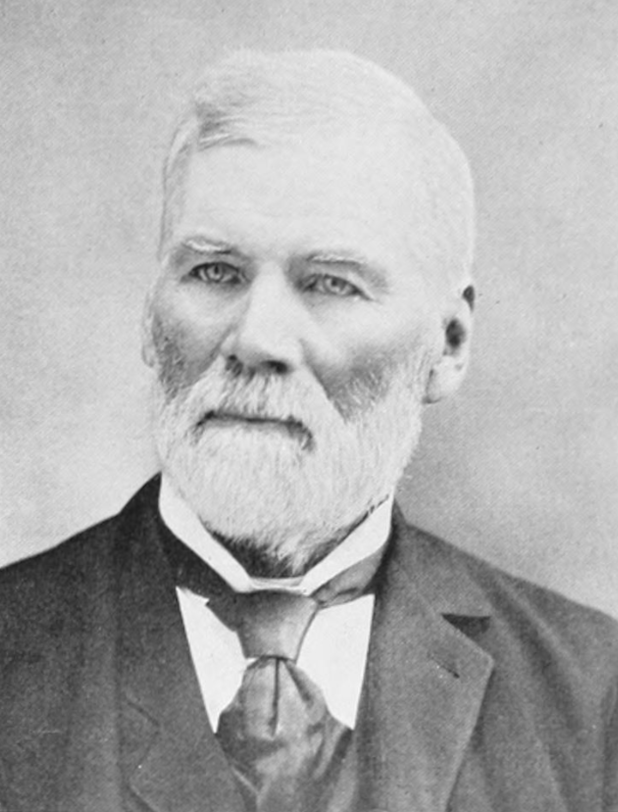

9th Speaker of the Minnesota House of Representatives
- In office 1867–1868
- Preceded by: James B. Wakefield
- Succeeded by: Chester D. Davidson

Minnesota State Representative
- In office 1866–1868

Member of the Minnesota Senate from the 3rd district
- In office January 2, 1872 – January 6, 1873
- Preceded by: William Chester Waite
- Succeeded by: William Meighen

Personal details
- Born: John Quincy Farmer; August 5, 1823 Burke, Vermont
- Died: August 17, 1904 (aged 81) near Billings, Montana
- Party: Whig; Republican
- Spouses: Maria N. Carpenter (m. 1852; died 1866) Susan C. Sharp (m. 1869)
- Children: 8
- Profession: Lawyer

John Quincy Farmer (August 5, 1823 – August 17, 1904) was a Minnesota politician, jurist, and Speaker of the Minnesota House of Representatives. He first served in the Minnesota House of Representatives in 1866, and was elected speaker one year later, serving in the position until he left the house in 1868. He later served in the Minnesota Senate from 1871 to 1872, and was a judge for Minnesota's 10th judicial district from 1880 to 1893.

== Biography ==
John Quincy Farmer was born in Burke, Vermont on August 5, 1823. After graduating from law school in New York State, he moved to Omro Township, Minnesota and began practicing as a lawyer.

He married Maria N. Carpenter on November 17, 1852, and they had two sons. She died on March 6, 1866, and he remarried to Susan C. Sharp on January 13, 1869. They had six sons together.

He died on August 17, 1904, while traveling westward on a Northern Pacific train outside of Billings, Montana. Farmer had been en route to Yellowstone National Park with his wife. He was eighty-one years of age.

Political offices
Preceded by James B. Wakefield	Speaker of the Minnesota House of Representatives; 1867–1868	Succeeded by Chester D. Davidson
