= David L. Buell =

American politician (1831–1906)

David L. Buell (May 26, 1831 – November 5, 1906) was an American politician from the State of Minnesota.

Buell was born in New London, Connecticut on May 26, 1831. In 1856, he moved to Caledonia, Minnesota. In 1863, he was elected into the Minnesota State House of Representatives. He would then serve in the Minnesota State Senate from 1867-1881, for Minnesota's 1st Senate district. He would also serve in the State Senate three inconsecutive times for the 13th district, being elected in 1865, 1867, 1869. In the 1875 Minnesota gubernatorial election, he was the Democratic Party of Minnesota's candidate for governor, losing to John S. Pillsbury. He previously ran for governor in 1873, but lost the nomination. He later unsuccessfully attempted to return to the House in 1882 and 1892.
