= Luther Loren Baxter =

American attorney and politician from Minnesota

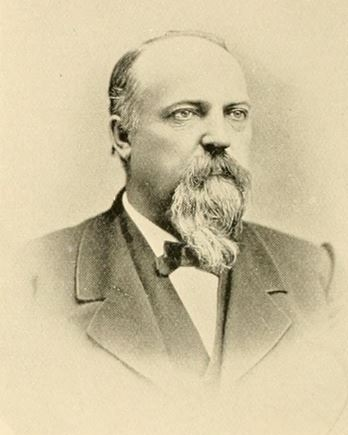
- From 1894's, Men of Vermont: An Illustrated Biographical History of Vermonters and Sons of Vermonters
- Born: Luther Loren Baxter; 8 June 1832; Cornwall, Vermont
- Died: 22 May 1915; Fergus Falls, Minnesota
- Occupations: Attorney and Probate Judge for Carver County, Minnesota
- American Civil War
- Allegiance: Union Army
- Branch: United States Army
- Service years: 1862-1865
- Rank: Colonel of 4th Minnesota Infantry Regiment and 1st Minnesota Heavy Artillery Regiment

Luther Loren Baxter (June 8, 1832 – May 22, 1915) was an American politician and lawyer.

Baxter was born in Cornwall, Vermont and attended Norwich University. He studied law with Horatio Seymour of Vermont. Baxter was admitted to the Wisconsin and Minnesota bars. He moved to Minnesota in 1857 and live in Glencoe, Minnesota and then in Chaska, Minnesota. He started the Glencoe Register newspaper with his brother. Baxter lived in Shakopee, Minnesota with his wife and family. Luther served in the 4th Minnesota Infantry Regiment during the American Civil War and was commissioned a colonel. He served as a United States Attorney and as a county attorney for Carver County, Minnesota. Baxter also served as a probate judge. He served in the Minnesota Senate from 1865 to 1868 and from 1870 to 1874 and in the Minnesota House of Representatives in 1869, in 1875, and from 1879 to 1882. Baxter was a Democrat. He died at his home in Fergus Falls, Minnesota and was buried in Chaska, Minnesota.
