= 1st Minnesota Legislature =

1857 legislative session

First Minnesota Legislature
←	8th Minnesota Territorial Legislature	2nd Minnesota Legislature	→
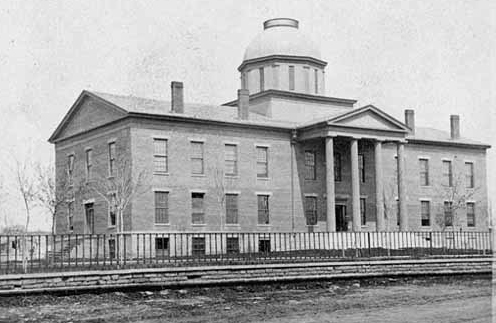

Overview
- Legislative body: Minnesota Legislature
- Jurisdiction: Minnesota, United States
- Term: December 2, 1857 – December 7, 1859
- Website: www.leg.state.mn.us

Minnesota State Senate
- Members: 37 State Senators
- Lieutenant Governor: William Holcombe
- President: Richard G. Murphy
- Party control: Democratic Party

Minnesota House of Representatives
- Members: 80 State Representatives
- Speaker: John S. Watrous, George Bradley
- Party control: Democratic Party

The 1st Minnesota Legislature first convened on December 2, 1857. The 37 members of the Minnesota Senate and the 80 members of the Minnesota House of Representatives were elected during the General Election of October 13, 1857. Although the Constitution of the State of Minnesota, which had been adopted by the voters at the 1857 general election, was not ratified by the United States Senate until May 11, 1858, this was the first legislature of the State of Minnesota to convene in conformity with the state constitution.

== Sessions ==
The legislature met in a regular session from December 2, 1857 to August 12, 1858, with a recess between March 25, 1858 and June 2, 1858. There were no special sessions; however, the regular session continued for 254 days, which still ranks the longest duration of any Minnesota Legislature. Due to the protracted length of the 1857-58 session, it was determined that an 1858-59 meeting of the legislature was unnecessary, and the 2nd Minnesota Legislature did not convene until December 1859.

== Party summary ==
Resignations and new members are discussed in the "Membership changes" section, below.

=== Senate ===
	Party (Shading indicates majority caucus)				Total	Vacant
	Democratic	Independent	Republican	Unknown	Total	Vacant
End of previous Legislature	6	0	5	4	15	0
Begin	20	0	17	0	37	0
Latest voting share	54%	0%	46%	0%		
Beginning of the next Legislature	13	1	23	0	37	0

=== House of Representatives ===
	Party (Shading indicates majority caucus)		Total	Vacant
	Democratic	Republican	Total	Vacant
End of previous Legislature	19	20	39	0
Begin	43	37	80	0
January 12, 1858	44	36	80	0
Latest voting share	55%	45%		
Beginning of the next Legislature	22	58	80	0

== Leadership ==
=== Senate ===
Lieutenant Governor (Note: William Holcombe, the first Lieutenant Governor of Minnesota, did not assume office until June 3, 1858. Until that date, Richard G. Murphy served as the President of the Minnesota Senate.)
Since June 3, 1858 William Holcombe (D-Stillwater)

President of the Senate
Until June 3, 1858 Richard G. Murphy (D-Shakopee)

=== House of Representatives ===
Speaker of the House
Until March 12, 1858 John S. Watrous (D-Clifton) (Note: John S. Watrous' profile in Minnesota Legislators Past & Present lists his party affiliation as "Not Available," while the Minnesota Legislative Reference Library's official list of speakers of the Minnesota House of Representatives lists "R?" The latter can be presumed to be an educated guess made on the assumption that the Minnesota Legislature was Republican- and Conservative-dominated roughly from statehood until the 1930s; however, the Democrats held substantive majorities in both houses during the 1st Legislature, which fact would tend to indicate that Watrous was more likely a Democrat. Watrous was also given a civil service appointment by the Buchanan Administration at the height of the patronage era—he would not have likely been appointed to such a post if he were not a Democrat. Additionally, Watrous was elected from a district which elected a Democrat to the State Senate, at a time when votes were most often cast by straight ticket in Minnesota, and his election as Speaker appears to have been a party-line vote, in which he was supported by Democrats while the Republicans voted for James Beach Wakefield.)
Since March 12, 1858 George Bradley (D-Belle Plaine) (Note: George Bradley's profile in Minnesota Legislators Past & Present lists his party affiliation as "Not Available," while the Minnesota Legislative Reference Library's official list of speakers of the Minnesota House of Representatives lists "R?" The latter can be presumed to be an educated guess made on the assumption that the Minnesota Legislature was Republican- and Conservative-dominated roughly from statehood until the 1930s; however, the Democrats held substantive majorities in both houses during the 1st Legislature, which fact would tend to indicate that Bradley was more likely a Democrat. Bradley was also given a civil service appointment by the Buchanan Administration at the height of the patronage era—he would not have likely been appointed to such a post if he were not a Democrat. Additionally, Bradley tended to vote with the Democrats on party-line votes.)

Speaker Pro Tempore (Note: John S. Watrous was initially elected Speaker of the Minnesota House of Representatives, but on December 22, 1857 took a leave of absence in order to attend to private business. On the same day, George Bradley was named Speaker Pro Tempore and began to serve in Watrous' stead. However, Watrous' absence endured far longer than the House felt was appropriate, and on March 12, 1858 the Speaker's chair was declared vacant and Bradley was elected to serve as Speaker in his own right.)
December 22, 1857 to March 12, 1858 George Bradley (D-Belle Plaine)

== Members ==
=== Senate ===
Name	District	City	Party
Adams, Samuel Emery	19	Monticello	Democratic
Bailly, Henry G.	03	Hastings	Democratic
Banfill, John	24	Manomin	Democratic (Note: Minnesota Legislators Past & Present does not list party affiliation information for Senators Banfill, Carlton, Cowan, Dunwell, Hodges, Hull, Mixer, Moreland, Murphy, Ridpath, Skinner, and Somers. However, the record from the Journal of the Senate During the First Session of the Legislature of the State of Minnesota shows in testimony given in an election challenge that Banfill was on the Democratic ticket. Additionally, the record in the Journal shows Hodges, Ridpath, and Somers voting with the Republicans on party-line votes at a sufficient frequency to warrant a presumption that they were likely Republicans themselves. As it is known that the Senate, in the first legislature, consisted of 20 Democrats and 17 Republicans, it can then be presumed that the remainder of the aforementioned Senators were most likely Democrats.)
Bates, Ersatus N.	04	Minneapolis	Republican
Beman, Samuel S.	11	Saratoga	Republican
Carlton, Reuben B.	26	Fond du Lac	Democratic
Cave, Charles S.	02	Saint Paul	Democratic
Chase, Jonathan N.	23	Saint Anthony	Republican
Cook, Michael	05	Faribault	Republican
Cowan, Thomas	17	Traverse des Sioux	Democratic
Day, James C.	10	La Crescent	Democratic
Dunwell, Dennis William Chauncey	03	West Saint Paul	Democratic
Folsom, William Henry Carman	25	Taylors Falls	Republican
Hall, William Sprigg	02	Saint Paul	Democratic
Hodges, Emerson	08	Marion	Republican
Hudson, Aaron C.	06	Florence	Republican
Hull, Samuel	09	Carimona	Democratic
Jones, John R.	09	Chatfield	Democratic
Lindsley, Charles H.	08	Rochester	Republican
McKune, Lewis L.	15	Morristown	Republican
Mixer, Elijah T.	18	Henderson	Democratic
Moreland, Basil	16	Mankato	Democratic
Murphy, Richard G.	07	Shakopee	Democratic
Northup, Anson	21	Swan River	Democratic
Norton, Daniel Sheldon	11	Winona	Republican
Phelps, Boyd	13	Elkhorn	Republican
Reiner, Joel K.	01	Stillwater	Republican
Richardson, Reuben M.	20	Sauk Rapids	Democratic
Ridpath, James	12	Tepeeota	Republican
Rolette, Joseph	22	Pembina	Democratic
Skinner, George E.	05	Faribault	Democratic
Smith, Delano T.	04	Minneapolis	Republican
Somers, Edward W.	13	Ashland	Republican
Streeter, Oscar W.	10	Unknown	Democratic
Hewitt L. Thomas	01	Afton	Republican
Van Etten, Isaac	02	Saint Paul	Democratic
Watson, George	14	Sumner	Republican

=== House of Representatives ===
Name	District	City	Party
Atkinson, James B.	20	Forest City	Democratic
Bacon, Samuel P.	13	Le Roy	Democratic
Balcombe, St. Andre Durand	11	Winona	Republican
Bartlett, Amander H.	14	Shell Rock	Republican
Bearce, Edwin M.	11	Winona	Republican
Bevans, Henry L.	06	Red Wing	Republican
Bradley, George	07	Belle Plaine	Democratic
Bray, Ebenezer	19	Carver	Democratic
Burgess, Sylvanus	08	Quincy	Republican
Butters, Reuben	16	Kasota	Democratic
Campbell, George W.	01	Point Douglas	Republican
Carpenter, Joseph B.	20	Princeton	Democratic
Chase, John N.	22	Saint Vincent	Democratic
Chowen, William Streeter	04	Minnetonka	Republican
Crosby, John W.	02	Saint Paul	Democratic
Cruttenden, Joel D.	21	Crow Wing	Democratic
Cummings, Michael	18	Kelso	Democratic
Davern, William Q.	02	Saint Paul	Democratic
DeCow, Isaac	09	Fillmore	Democratic
Dow, James C.	03	Hastings	Democratic
Dunham, William N.	14	Unknown	Republican
Eames, Theodore J.	09	Canton	Democratic
Fladeland, T. J.	09	Rushford	Democratic
Foster, Major J.	09	Forestville	Democratic
Frost, James C.	24	Anoka	Democratic
Gaskill, James R.M.	01	Marine	Republican
Gibson, Reuben B.	04	Bloomington	Republican
Graham, James M.	09	Canton	Democratic
Grover, Manley	11	Saint Charles	Republican
Holtan, Hans	06	Red Wing	Republican
Hawkins, Lewis R.	07	Spring Lake	Democratic
Heyd, Ernst	19	Scandia	Republican
Hinkley, James B.	04	Dayton	Republican
Johnson, S. R.	11	Richmond	Republican
Johnson, Smith	15	Medford	Republican
Keith, George H.	04	Minneapolis, Minnesota	Republican
Kibler, Henry	09	Forestville	Democratic
Kinghorn, David	07	Eagle Creek	Democratic
Kingsley, George B.	14	Blue Earth	Democratic
Le Blond, John	10	Brownsville	Democratic
Leonard, George L.	15	Unknown	Republican
Libbey, Charles W.	06	Roscoe	Republican
Locke, James	03	West Saint Paul	Democratic
Lord, Samuel	08	Marion	Republican
Lyle, Robert	13	Lyle	Republican
Mackintire, Edmund	10	Yucatan	Democratic
Masters, Robert C.	03	Waterford	Democratic
McGrorty, William B.	02	Saint Paul	Democratic
Murphy, M. T.	03	Mendota	Democratic
O'Neal, Robert	03	Eagan	Democratic
Otis, George Lamartine	02	Saint Paul	Democratic
Parker, John H.	05	Faribault	Republican
Peckham, Joseph	06	Cannon Falls	Republican
Pettie, George C.	15	Aurora	Republican
Pierce, Ephraim	17	Saint Peter	Democratic
Poehler, Henry	18	Henderson	Democratic
Powers, E. Allen	08	Oronoco	Republican
Randall, John G.	25	Chengwatana	Republican
Rauch, Charles	02	Saint Paul	Democratic
Rehfeld, Frederick	17	New Ulm	Democratic
Rutan, A. J.	16	Le Sueur	Democratic
Scofield, John L.	05	Northfield	Democratic
Seeley, Ira O.	12	Mazeppa	Republican
Sheetz, Hiram M.	15	Unknown	Republican
Simpson, Robert	01	Stillwater	Republican
Starkey, James	02	Saint Paul	Democratic
Stevens, John Harrington	18	Glencoe	Democratic
Talbot, Josiah H.	19	Clearwater	Republican
Tattersall, William K.	08	High Forest	Republican
Tefft, Nathaniel S.	12	Minneiska	Republican
Thompson, Matthew	16	South Bend	Republican
Thompson, Thomas A.	12	Plainview	Republican
Townsend, William H.	23	Saint Anthony	Republican
Tuttle, Albert	17	Milford	Democratic
Vertress, Warren	05	Cannon City	Democratic
Wakefield, James Beach	14	Blue Earth	Republican
Walker, L. C.	23	Saint Anthony	Republican
Watrous, John S.	26	Clifton	Democratic
Way, George O.	13	Claremont	Democratic
Willson, Daniel F.	10	Unknown	Democratic
Young, John L.	20	Unknown	Democratic

== Membership changes ==
=== House of Representatives ===
District	Vacated by	Reason for change	Successor	Date successor seated
14	William N. Dunham (R)	Although Dunham was initially seated, the seat was contested by Kingsley on the grounds of issues regarding the validity of votes cast in a single precinct. On January 12, 1858 the House determined that Kingsley was entitled to the seat.	George B. Kingsley (D)	January 12, 1858

== Notes ==
Preceded by Eighth Minnesota Territorial Legislature	First Minnesota Legislature; 1857—1858	Succeeded by Second Minnesota Legislature
