= 2nd Minnesota Legislature =

1859 to 1860 legislative session

Second Minnesota Legislature
←	1st Minnesota Legislature	3rd Minnesota Legislature	→
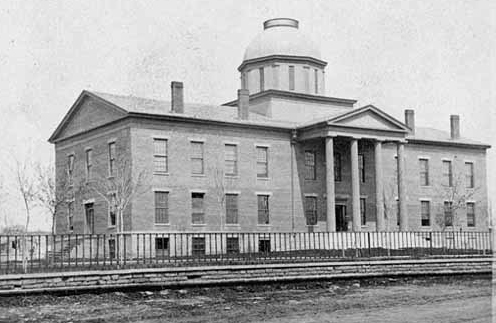

Overview
- Legislative body: Minnesota Legislature
- Jurisdiction: Minnesota, United States
- Term: December 7, 1859 – January 8, 1861
- Website: www.leg.state.mn.us

Minnesota State Senate
- Members: 37 Senators
- Lieutenant Governor: William Holcombe, Ignatius L. Donnelly
- Party control: Republican Party

Minnesota House of Representatives
- Members: 80 Representatives
- Speaker: Amos Coggswell
- Party control: Republican Party

The second Minnesota Legislature first convened on December 7, 1859. The 37 members of the Minnesota Senate and the 80 members of the Minnesota House of Representatives were elected during the General Election of October 11, 1859.

== Sessions ==
The legislature met in a regular session from December 7, 1859 to March 12, 1860. There were no special sessions of the second legislature.

== Party summary ==
Resignations and new members are discussed in the "Membership changes" section, below.

=== Senate ===
	Party (Shading indicates majority caucus)			Total	Vacant
	Democratic	Independent	Republican	Total	Vacant
End of previous Legislature	20	0	17	37	0
Begin	13	1	23	37	0
January 6, 1860	11	1	25	37	0
Latest voting share	30%	3%	68%		
Beginning of the next Legislature	2	0	19	21	0

=== House of Representatives ===
	Party (Shading indicates majority caucus)		Total	Vacant
	Democratic	Republican	Total	Vacant
End of previous Legislature	44	36	80	0
Begin	22	58	80	0
December 29, 1859	19	58	77	3
December 30, 1859	19	61	80	0
Latest voting share	24%	76%		
Beginning of the next Legislature	3	39	42	0

== Leadership ==
=== Senate ===
Lieutenant Governor
Until January 2, 1860 William Holcombe (D-Stillwater)
Since January 2, 1860 Ignatius L. Donnelly (R-Nininger)

=== House of Representatives ===
Speaker of the House
Amos Coggswell (R-Aurora)

== Members ==
=== Senate ===
Name	District	City	Party
Adams, Samuel Emery	19	Monticello	Democratic
Andrews, Christopher Columbus	20	Saint Cloud	Democratic
Averill, John Thomas	12	Lake City	Republican
Baldwin, F. Eugene	24	Clear Lake	Republican
Baldwin, J. F.	07	Belle Plaine	Republican
Bartholomew, Riley Lucas	04	Richfield	Republican
Bishop, Jesse	04	Minneapolis	Republican
Bryant, Orlando B.	09	Bloomfield	Democratic
Clark, Thomas	26	Beaver Bay	Democratic
Cook, Michael	05	Faribault	Republican
Cowan, Thomas	17	Traverse des Sioux	Democratic
Cruttenden, Joel D.	21	Crow Wing	Democratic
Edgerton, Alonzo Jay	13	Mantorville	Democratic (Note: Alonzo J. Edgerton was a Republican during his service in the 19th and 20th Minnesota Legislatures, as well as during his short service in the 47th United States Congress. However, the Minnesota Staats-Zeitung listed him as a Democrat in 1859, he ran for Congress in 1860 as a Breckenridge Democrat and, during his service in the 2nd Minnesota Legislature, tended more often than not to vote with the Democrats on party-line votes, indicating that he was a Democrat prior to 1861, and likely changed party affiliations in response to the secession of the Southern states and the American Civil War.)
Evans, David C.	16	South Bend	Republican
Frost, Daniel H.	05	Northfield	Republican
Galloway, Hector	08	Oronoco	Republican
Gluck, Frederick	10	Brownsville	Republican
Hall, William Sprigg	02	Saint Paul	Democratic
Heaton, David	23	Saint Anthony	Republican
Hodges, Emerson	08	Marion	Republican
Holley, Henry W.	09	Chatfield	Republican
Kennedy, E. H.	10	Looneyville	Republican
King, Ephraim L.	11	Winona	Republican
Mackubin, Charles N.	02	Saint Paul	Democratic
McKusick, William	01	Stillwater	Republican
McLaren, Robert N.	06	Red Wing	Republican
Nelson, Socrates	01	Stillwater	Democratic
Norris, A. H.	03	Hastings	Democratic
O'Ferrall, Ignatius F.	09	Unknown	Democratic
Pettit, William F.	15	Owatonna	Democratic
Robinson, Eli	03	Hastings	Independent
Rogers, Henry C.	13	Mower City	Republican
Stannard, Lucius K.	25	Taylors Falls	Republican
Stevens, John Harrington	18	Glencoe	Democratic
Stewart, Jacob Henry	02	Saint Paul	Republican
Taylor, Oscar	22	Saint Cloud	Democratic
Watson, George	14	Sumner	Republican
Wells, Reuben	09	Canfield	Republican
Winn, J. M.	11	Richmond	Republican

=== House of Representatives ===
Name	District	City	Party
Aaker, Lars K.	06	Alexandria	Republican
Abbott, Burroughs	16	Lexington	Republican
Abraham, J. P.	04	Minneapolis	Republican
Acker, Henry	02	Saint Paul	Republican
Anderson, John A.	10	La Crescent	Republican
Armstrong, John H.	17	New Ulm	Democratic
Arnold, William J.	12	Wabasha	Republican
Austin, Adin C.	04	Osseo	Republican
Baldwin, George P.	23	Saint Anthony	Republican
Barton, Ara	03	Northfield	Democratic
Beatty, Hamilton	18	Arlington	Democratic
Bixler, Moses	03	West Saint Paul	Republican
Brooks, Sheldon	11	Beaver	Republican
Burnham, John W.	12	Plainview	Republican
Butler, A. H.	09	Newburg	Republican
Caskey, Henry	03	Lakeville	Republican
Chadderdon, Jonathan	07	Belle Plaine	Democratic
Cleary, Peter	07	New Dublin	Democratic
Cleveland, Guy K.	14	Winnebago City	Republican
Coe, Charles A.	10	Winnebago City	Republican
Coggswell, Amos	15	Aurora	Republican
Dayton, Daniel	09	Big Spring	Republican
Donohue, Mathew H.	18	Henderson	Democratic
Fox, Patrick	25	Taylors Falls	Republican
Garrard, Lewis Hector	06	Frontenac	Republican
Green, George W.	15	Clinton Falls	Republican
Green, George W.	08	Pleasant Grove	Republican
Hayes, Archibald M.	03	Hastings	Republican
Hulett, Luke	05	Faribault	Republican
Hunt, Thomas J.	13	Concord	Republican
Johnson, R. M.	24	Anoka	Republican
Kinkead, Alex	22	Alexandria	Democratic
Knox, R. H.	06	Cannon Falls	Republican
Langworthy, Benjamin Franklin	13	Grand Meadow	Republican
Leavens, Eden N.H.	05	Faribault	Republican
Letford, John S.	06	Carver	Republican
Mann, Horatio E.	04	Minneapolis	Republican
Mantor, Peter	13	Mantorville	Republican
McDonough, Thomas	16	Ottawa	Republican
Meighen, William	09	Forestville	Republican
Mitchell, William B.	11	Winona	Republican
Mitsch, George	02	Saint Paul	Democratic
Morrison, H. G.O.	03	Pine Bend	Republican
Nettleton, William	26	Duluth	Democratic
Newell, Stephen	03	Unknown	Democratic
Olds, Alfred J.	08	Quincy	Republican
Olivier, John B.	02	Saint Paul	Democratic
Ozmun, Abraham	08	Rochester	Republican
Pfaender, William	17	New Ulm	Republican
Purdie, Thomas W.	14	Freeborn	Republican
Rehfeld, Frederick	17	New Ulm	Democratic
Renz, F. A.	19	Chaska	Republican
Robertson, Daniel A.	02	Saint Paul	Democratic
Roy, Peter	21	Crow Wing	Democratic
Sanborn, John Benjamin	02	Saint Paul	Republican
Sawyer, J. Swain	08	Chatfield	Republican
Secombe, David A.	23	Saint Anthony	Republican
Sheafer, Henry J.	03	Mendota	Democratic
Sherwood, Charles D.	09	Elkhorn	Republican
Shrewsbury, Irvin	04	Maple Plain	Republican
Shriner, Peter	07	Sand Creek	Democratic
Shultis, Allen	14	Blue Earth City	Republican
Skillman, Francis M.	12	Mazeppa	Republican
Stearns, Isaac C.	06	Zumbrota	Republican
Stephenson, Oscar	02	Saint Paul	Democratic
Stevens, Orlando	11	Minnesota City	Republican
Stewart, Jesse I.	15	Wilton	Republican
Stoek, Henry	16	Shelbyville	Republican
Sweet, George W.	20	Sauk Rapids	Democratic
Taylor, Jackson	19	Buffalo	Republican
Temanson, George	10	Spring Grove	Republican
Thayer, Zenas	11	Warren	Republican
Tolman, Moody C.	20	Watab	Democratic
Trow, A. H.	09	Chatfield	Republican
Van Vorhes, Andrew Jackson	01	Stillwater	Republican
Waldhier, Michael	03	Unknown	Democratic
Walker, Hiram	09	Rushford	Republican
Walker, Orange	01	Marine	Republican
Watson, Daniel T.	01	Lakeland	Republican
Webster, Ferris	05	Union Lake	Republican
White, George T.	12	Saint Mary	Republican
Wilkins, Peter	18	Henderson	Democratic
Willey, U. S.	20	Forest City	Democratic

== Membership changes ==
=== Senate ===
District	Vacated by	Reason for change	Successor	Date successor seated
09	Orlando B. Bryant (D)	Bryant and O'Ferrall were initially seated with certificates of election issued by order of the Minnesota Supreme Court, but Holley and Wells contested the election. On January 6, 1860, the Senate determined that, in accordance with the provisions of the Constitution of Minnesota which assigned to each house of the legislature the power to judge the elections and qualifications of its own members, the Supreme Court did not have jurisdiction to determine the membership of the Senate. The Senate then determined that Holley and Wells were entitled to the seats.	Henry W. Holley (R)	January 6, 1860
09	Ignatius F. O'Ferrall (D)		Reuben Wells (R)	January 6, 1860

=== House of Representatives ===
District	Vacated by	Reason for change	Successor	Date successor seated
03	Ara Barton (D)	Barton, Newell, and Waldhier were initially seated; however, Bixler, Caskey, and Hayes challenged their election on the grounds that the Democrats in the district had engaged in voter intimidation against Republican voters, and illegal votes were cast. On December 29, 1859, the House of Representatives ruled that Bixler, Caskey, and Hayes were rightfully entitled to the seats, and thereby unseated Barton, Newell, and Waldhier.	Moses Bixler (R)	December 30, 1859
03	Stephen Newell (D)	Barton, Newell, and Waldhier were initially seated; however, Bixler, Caskey, and Hayes challenged their election on the grounds that the Democrats in the district had engaged in voter intimidation against Republican voters, and illegal votes were cast. On December 29, 1859, the House of Representatives ruled that Bixler, Caskey, and Hayes were rightfully entitled to the seats, and thereby unseated Barton, Newell, and Waldhier.	Henry Caskey (R)	December 30, 1859
03	Michael Waldhier (D)	Barton, Newell, and Waldhier were initially seated; however, Bixler, Caskey, and Hayes challenged their election on the grounds that the Democrats in the district had engaged in voter intimidation against Republican voters, and illegal votes were cast. On December 29, 1859, the House of Representatives ruled that Bixler, Caskey, and Hayes were rightfully entitled to the seats, and thereby unseated Barton, Newell, and Waldhier.	Archibald M. Hayes (R)	December 30, 1859

== Standing committees ==
=== Senate ===
Committee	Republican members	Democratic members	Independent members
Ways and Means	Emerson Hodges, John T. Averill	Thomas Cowan	N/A
State Affairs	Michael Cook, Riley L. Bartholomew	Samuel E. Adams	N/A
Judiciary	Jesse Bishop, Lucius K. Stannard	Christopher Columbus Andrews	N/A
Internal Improvements	John T. Averill, Ephraim L. King	Joel D. Cruttenden	N/A
Harbors	Frederick Gluck, Robert N. McLaren	Thomas Clark	N/A
Elections	F. Eugene Baldwin, Emerson Hodges	A. H. Norris	N/A
Federal Relations	David Heaton, Hector Galloway	William Sprigg Hall	N/A
Banks	Robert N. McLaren, Eli Robinson	Alonzo J. Edgerton	N/A
Public Lands	J. F. Baldwin, Daniel H. Frost	William F. Pettit	N/A
Printing	Jacob H. Stewart, Ephraim L. King	Thomas Cowan	N/A
Agriculture and Manufacture	George Watson, Henry C. Rogers	John H. Stevens	N/A
Towns and Counties	Daniel H. Frost, Frederick Gluck	Oscar Taylor	N/A
Education and Science	J. M. Winn, Jacob H. Stewart	Christopher Columbus Andrews	N/A
Incorporations	Lucius K. Stannard, William McKusick	Charles N. Mackubin	N/A
Engrossment	E. H. Kennedy, Michael Cook	A. H. Norris	N/A
Militia	Riley L. Bartholomew, E. H. Kennedy	John H. Stevens	N/A
State Prison	William McKusick, Jesse Bishop	Socrates Nelson	N/A
State Library	Ephraim L. King, George Watson	William F. Pettit	N/A
Indian Affairs	Henry C. Rogers, David C. Evans	Joel D. Crutenden	N/A
Public Buildings	Hector Galloway, Lucius K. Stannard	Ignatius F. O'Ferrall	N/A
Roads and Bridges	Frederick Gluck	Orlando B. Bryant	Eli Robinson
Enrollment	David C. Evans, J. M. Winn	Oscar Taylor	N/A
University and University Lands	David Heaton, J. F. Baldwin	William S. Hall	N/A

== Notes ==
Preceded by First Minnesota Legislature	Second Minnesota Legislature; 1859—1860	Succeeded by Third Minnesota Legislature
