= E. Allen Powers =

Canadian American politician

- Ambrotype of Powers c. 1858

Member of the Minnesota House of Representatives from the 8th district
- In office December 2, 1857 – December 6, 1859 Serving with Sylvanus Burgess, Samuel Lord, and William K. Tattersall
- Preceded by: Position established
- Succeeded by: Hector Galloway

Personal details
- Born: c. 1832 Canada
- Died: Unknown
- Occupation: Politician, journalist

E. Allen Powers (born c. 1832) also known as Ned E. Allan Powers, was a Canadian American politician, journalist, and early citizen of Oronoco, Minnesota. Powers served a single term in the Minnesota House of Representatives.

== Early life and career ==
Powers was born around 1832 in Canada. Powers moved to Minnesota Territory in the 1850s, eventually settling in Oronoco, Minnesota. While in Oronoco Powers became the editor-in-chief of the local newspaper, the Oronoco Courier. The Oronoco Courier was established in the autumn of 1856 by Powers, Leonard B. Hodges, John B. Clark, E.S. Collins, and Reuben Ottoman.^{:284} The Oronoco Courier was the first newspaper established in Olmsted County, Minnesota, although it ceased printing a year later due to the Panic of 1857.^{:38}

== Political career ==
Powers was elected to serve in the Minnesota House of Representatives on October 13, 1857, representing Minnesota's 8th House district (Olmsted County). Powers served in the 1st Minnesota Legislature, during his term he was a member of the Indian affairs committee.
