= Edward W. Somers =

American politician (born 1828)

- Somers c. 1858

Member of the Minnesota Senate from the 13th district
- In office December 2, 1857 – December 6, 1859 Serving with Boyd Phelps
- Preceded by: Position established
- Succeeded by: Alonzo J. Edgerton

Personal details
- Born: c. 1828 New York, U.S.

Edward W. Somers (born c. 1828) was an American politician and farmer who served a single term in the Minnesota Senate during the 1st Minnesota Legislature. Somers later served as the enrolling clerk for the 2nd Minnesota Legislature and was the assistant secretary to the Minnesota Senate during the 5th Minnesota Legislature.

== Early life ==
According to the January 27, 1860 issue of The Weekly Pioneer and Democrat, Somers was born around 1828 in New York. Somers moved to Minnesota Territory in 1856 and settled in Ashland Township in Dodge County, Minnesota where he worked as a farmer.

== Political career ==
Somers was elected as a member of the Minnesota Senate on October 13, 1857 as a state senator representing Minnesota's 13th Senate district along with Boyd Phelps. At the time, the district included Dodge County and Mower County. Somers served in the 1st Minnesota Legislature from December 2, 1857 to December 6, 1859. During his term, Somers was a member of the Education and Sciences Committee.

In 1860 Somers served as the enrolling clerk for the Minnesota Senate during the 2nd Minnesota Legislature. On January 6, 1863 Somers was selected as the assistant secretary to the Minnesota Senate during the 5th Minnesota Legislature.
