= Reuben B. Gibson =

American politician

- Ambrotype of Gibson c. 1858

Member of the Minnesota House of Representatives from the 4th District
- In office December 2, 1857 – December 6, 1859 Serving with George H. Keith, William S. Chowen, and James B. Hinkley

Postmaster of Bloomington, Minnesota

Personal details
- Born: Unknown Bedford, New Hampshire, U.S.
- Died: November 13, 1872 Minnesota, U.S.

Reuben B. Gibson (Unknown – November 13, 1872), also known as R. B. Gibson, was an American politician and early citizen of Bloomington, Minnesota, who served a single term in the Minnesota House of Representatives.

== Early life and career ==
Gibson's early life is unknown until he moved to Minnesota Territory in 1850, originally arriving in St. Anthony.^{:92} In 1852 Gibson settled land near Nine Mile Creek in Hennepin County alongside Joseph Dean, William Chambers, and others, which would become the city of Bloomington, Minnesota.^{:186}^{:176} Gibson served as Bloomington's first postmaster.^{:192} The first city hall meeting in Bloomington was held in Gibson's home on May 11, 1858, where Gibson was elected as a city supervisor.^{:223}

== Political career ==
Gibson was elected on October 13, 1857, to serve in the Minnesota House of Representatives, representing Minnesota's 4th House district in the 1st Minnesota Legislature. At the time the 4th House district included Hennepin County. During his term Gibson was a member of the incorporations committee. Gibson was Republican.^{:292}

== Later life and death ==
In 1871 Gibson was implicated in a large forgery scheme in Minneapolis which totaled over $3,000. According to the February 16, 1871 issue of the Minnesota Staats-Zeitung, Gibson abandoned his family during the forgery affair. He died a year later on November 13, 1872.

== Personal life ==
Gibson was married to Margaret A. McAllaster in Bedford, New Hampshire, on November 29, 1831.
