= Andrew Rutan =

American politician and physician

Andrew J. Rutan
- Ambrotype of Rutan c. 1858

Member of the Minnesota House of Representatives from the 16th district
- In office December 2, 1857 – December 6, 1859 Serving with Reuben Butters
- Governor: Samuel Medary; Henry Hastings Sibley

Personal details
- Died: May 1, 1869 Le Sueur, Minnesota, U.S.
- Occupation: Physician

Andrew J. Rutan (died May 1, 1869), also known as A. J. Rutan, was an American physician, politician, and early citizen of Le Sueur, Minnesota who served a single term in the Minnesota House of Representatives.

== Career ==
Rutan's life previous to his time in Minnesota is unknown. Rutan was living in Minnesota Territory in Le Sueur by 1857. Rutan was elected to serve in the Minnesota House of Representatives on October 13, 1857, representing Minnesota's 16th House district in the 1st Minnesota Legislature. Rutan represented the 16th Minnesota House district alongside Reuben Butters. During his term in the legislature, Rutan was the chair of the printing committee and was a member of the banks committee.

In 1860 Rutan served as a county commissioner for Le Sueur County, Minnesota. From 1862 to 1863 Rutan worked as a doctor in the city of Le Sueur. When the city of Le Sueur was formally incorporated on March 9, 1867, Rutan was appointed as the justice of the peace.

== Death ==
Rutan died on Saturday May 1, 1869. Rutan's funeral was one of the largest in the history of Le Sueur.
