= Lewis L. McKune =

American politician (1821–1861)

- McKune c. 1858

Member of the Minnesota Senate from the 15th District
- In office December 2, 1857 – December 6, 1859
- Governor: Samuel Medary; Henry Hastings Sibley

Personal details
- Born: July 22, 1821 Susquehanna County, Pennsylvania, U.S.
- Died: July 21, 1861 (aged 39) Manassas, Virginia, U.S.
- Other political affiliations: Republican

Military service
- Allegiance: United States
- Branch/service: Union Army
- Years of service: 1861–1861
- Rank: Captain
- Unit: 1st Minnesota Infantry Regiment
- Commands: Company G, 1st Minnesota Infantry Regiment
- Battles/wars: American Civil War; First Battle of Bull Run †

Lewis L. McKune (July 22, 1821 – July 21, 1861), also spelled as Lewis McCune, was an American politician, businessman, farmer, and military officer. McKune served a single term in the Minnesota Senate as part of the 1st Minnesota Legislature and was later killed in the American Civil War at the First Battle of Bull Run. McKune is noted as being the first person from Waseca County, Minnesota to die in the conflict.

== Early life ==
McKune was born on July 22, 1821 in Susquehanna County, Pennsylvania. McKune's father was Joshua McKune who was acquainted with Martin Harris and Joseph Smith during their residence in Harmony Township. McKune was educated in Pennsylvania before moving to Illinois at the age of 25. McKune successfully took part in the California gold rush, eventually returning to Illinois in 1854. McKune moved to Minnesota Territory in 1856 and settled in Morristown, Minnesota near Wilton Township in Waseca County where he worked as a farmer and served as a member of the local school board.

== Politics ==
McKune began his career in Minnesota politics as a member of the 1857 Minnesota Constitutional Convention which ratified the Minnesota Constitution, at the time McKune was a member of the Republican Party of Minnesota.^{:60} During the convention McKune represented the 10th Council District of the Minnesota Territory alongside Amos Coggswell and Edwin P. Davis.^{:45}

McKune was later elected to the Minnesota Senate on October 13, 1857. McKune was sworn into office on December 2, 1857 and served in the 1st Minnesota Legislature from December 2, 1857 to December 6, 1859 as the chairman of the Roads and Bridges Committee, as well as a member of the Judiciary Committee and the Towns and Counties Committee. McKune eventually retired from politics and worked as a business owner in Morristown.

== Military service and death ==
During the American Civil War McKune enlisted in the Union Army on April 29, 1861 and was commissioned as the Captain of Company G of the 1st Minnesota Infantry Regiment, nicknamed "the Faribault Guards".^{:25} McKune was killed in action on July 21, 1861 during the First Battle of Bull Run.^{:25} McKune's sword, belt, and watch were retrieved by Major William H. Dike of the 1st Minnesota who sent them back to Minnesota to his family. McKune's burial details are unknown.

== Legacy ==
Lewis McKune Post #10 of the Grand Army of the Republic in Morristown was named in honor of McKune.
