= George O. Way =

American businessman and politician (1829–1919)

- Ambrotype of Way c. 1857

Member of the Minnesota House of Representatives from the 13th District
- In office December 2, 1857 – December 6, 1859 Serving with Samuel P. Bacon and Robert Lyle
- Preceded by: Position established
- Succeeded by: B. F. Langworthy and Peter Mantor

Personal details
- Born: 1829 Lempster, New Hampshire, U.S.
- Died: April 6, 1910 (aged 80–81) Minneapolis, Minnesota, U.S.

George O. Way (1829 – April 6, 1910) was an American businessman, politician, and early citizen of Claremont, Minnesota.

== Early life ==
Way was born in 1829 in Lempster, New Hampshire in Sullivan County.^{:501} He moved to Minnesota Territory in 1854 and settled in the city of Claremont in Dodge County.^{:501} Way's obituary from the April 13, 1900, issue of the Owatonna-based People's Press lists Way's occupation as a cooper.

== Political career ==
Way served in the Minnesota House of Representatives representing the 13th House district during the 1st Minnesota Legislature. At the time the district included both Dodge County and Mower County. During his term in the legislature, Day was a member of the ways and means committee. Way also served as a commissioner of Dodge County, was a town clerk in Claremont,^{:502} and served as the postmaster of Claremont.^{:916}

== Later life and death ==
In 1872, Way moved to Faribault, Minnesota.^{:501} Way later moved to Waterford, Minnesota, and worked for the Cannon River Manufacturing Company.^{:502} In his final years Way moved to Minneapolis where he died on April 6, 1900, from typhoid pneumonia. Way is buried in Claremont.

== Personal life ==
Way was married to Sarah A. Mitchell in 1851 in New Hampshire.^{:502}
