= William H. Townsend (Minnesota politician) =

American politician

- Ambrotype of Townsend c. 1858

Member of the Minnesota House of Representatives from the 23rd district
- In office December 2, 1857 – December 6, 1859 Serving with Lucius C. Walker
- Governor: Samuel Medary; Henry Hastings Sibley

Treasurer of St. Anthony, Minnesota
- In office April 13, 1855 – April 7, 1856
- Preceded by: Position established
- Succeeded by: D. B. Dorman

Personal details
- Born: October 5, 1818 Brunswick, Maine, U.S.
- Died: November 22, 1868 (aged 50) Minneapolis, Minnesota, U.S.
- Resting place: Lakewood Cemetery
- Other political affiliations: Republican

William Henry Townsend (October 5, 1818 – November 22, 1868), also known as W. H. Townsend, was an American politician and early citizen of St. Anthony, Minnesota who served a single term in the Minnesota House of Representatives.

== Early life and family ==
Townsend was born on October 5, 1818, in Brunswick, Maine. Townsend moved to Minnesota Territory in 1849 and settled in St. Anthony, Minnesota in Hennepin County. Townsend was the first of his family to move to Minnesota, his brothers Denison Townsend and Robert Townsend also settled in Minnesota.

== Political career ==
While in St. Anthony, Townsend was elected as the city's treasurer on April 13, 1855. Townsend would serve as treasurer until April 7, 1856, when he was succeeded by D. B. Dorman. Townsend was later elected to the Minnesota House on October 13, 1857, representing the 23rd House district in the 1st Minnesota Legislature. During his term Townsend was a member of the towns and counties committee. Townsend politically identified as a Republican.

== Death ==
Townsend died on Sunday, November 22, 1868. He is buried in Lakewood Cemetery.

== Personal life ==
Townsend was married to Emily J. Nason on July 12, 1852.
