= James Locke (Minnesota politician) =

American politician

- Ambrotype of Locke c. 1858

Member of the Minnesota House of Representatives from the 3rd district
- In office December 2, 1857 – December 6, 1859 Serving with James C. Dow, Robert C. Masters, Robert O'Neal, and M.T. Murphy
- Governor: Samuel Medary; Henry H. Sibley

Judge of Probate for Dakota County, Minnesota
- In office 1853–1857
- Preceded by: Position established
- Succeeded by: John J. McVey

Personal details
- Born: 1806 Ireland
- Died: December 1, 1889 (aged 82–83) West St. Paul, Minnesota, U.S.
- Resting place: Calvary Cemetery, Saint Paul, Minnesota, U.S.
- Other political affiliations: Democrat

James Locke (1806 – December 1, 1889) was an Irish-American politician and early citizen of West St. Paul, Minnesota who served in the Minnesota Legislature.

== Early life ==
Locke was born in 1806 in Ireland. Locke eventually emigrated to the United States and in 1846 settled in Ramsey County in Minnesota Territory. In 1853 Locke moved to Dakota County. By 1857 Locke was living in West St. Paul, Minnesota.

== Political career ==
In 1851 Locke was elected as a county commissioner for Ramsey County. While living in West St. Paul, Locke served as the judge of the Dakota County probate court for two terms, he was elected in 1853 and again in 1855, he served until 1857 when he was succeeded by John J. McVey (also spelled as McVay).^{:169} McVey had previously represented Dakota County in the 8th Minnesota Territorial Legislature.

Locke was elected to the Minnesota House of Representatives on October 13, 1857, representing Minnesota's 3rd House district in the 1st Minnesota Legislature. During his term in the Minnesota House Locke was a member of the agriculture and manufactures committee.

Locke later ran unsuccessfully in 1862 as a candidate for a second term in the Minnesota House representing Minnesota's 7th House district. Locke won 18.6% of the vote, he lost to Republican candidate Oren T. Hayes and Democrat candidate George C. Chamberlain.

The Minnesota Historical Election Archive identifies Locke's political affiliation as Democratic.

== Death ==
Locke died on December 1, 1889, he is buried in Calvary Cemetery in Saint Paul.
