= David Kinghorn =

American politician

- Ambrotype of Kinghorn c. 1858

Member of the Minnesota House of Representatives from the 7th district
- In office December 2, 1857 – December 6, 1859 Serving with George Bradley and Lewis R. Hawkins
- Governor: Samuel Medary; Henry Hastings Sibley
- Preceded by: Position established
- Succeeded by: Jonathan Chadderdon, Peter Cleary, and Peter Shriner

Personal details
- Born: October 8, 1809 St Vigeans, Scotland
- Died: April 24, 1890 (aged 80) Minnesota, U.S.

David Kinghorn (October 8, 1809 – April 24, 1890) was an American businessman, politician, and early citizen of Scott County, Minnesota who served as single term in the Minnesota House of Representatives.

== Early life and career ==
Kinghorn was born on October 8, 1809, in St Vigeans in Angus, Scotland. While in Scotland Kinghorn worked as a miller.^{:316} In 1829 Kinghorn emigrated to Canada where he continued to work in the milling trade before moving to the United States and settling in New York.^{:316} In 1839 Kinghorn moved to Kane County, Illinois where he continued to work as a miller.^{:316} Kinghorn later moved to Cook County, Illinois and engaged in farming.^{:316}

On July 14, 1852, Kinghorn moved to Scott County in Minnesota Territory and settled in the town of Eagle Creek near modern-day Shakopee, Minnesota.^{:315}

== Political career ==
During the Minnesota constitutional convention which ratified the Minnesota Constitution, Kinghorn was the sergeant-at-arms of the constitutional convention.^{:316}

Kinghorn was elected to the Minnesota House of Representatives on October 13, 1857, representing Minnesota's 7th House district in the 1st Minnesota Legislature. Kinghorn served alongside George Bradley and Lewis R. Hawkins, who also represented Minnesota's 7th House district in the legislature. During Kinghorn's term in the legislature he was a member of the federal relations committee and was the chairman of the rules and joint rules committee.

== Later life and death ==
Following his political career Kinghorn was a teacher at the Lower Sioux Agency (also called the Redwood Agency) for two and a half years.^{:316}

Kinghorn died on April 24, 1890.

== Personal life ==
Kinghorn was married to Anna Pow, also of Scotland.^{:316}
