= William Q. Davern =

American politician and farmer (1829–1913)

- Davern c. 1900

Member of the Minnesota House of Representatives from the 2nd District
- In office December 2, 1857 – December 6, 1859 Serving with John W. Crosby, William B. McGrorty, Charles Rauch, George L. Otis, and James Starkey

Personal details
- Born: June 24, 1829 Lismorahaun, County Clare, Ireland
- Died: June 30, 1913 (aged 84) Saint Paul, Minnesota, U.S.
- Resting place: Calvary Cemetery; Saint Paul, Minnesota, U.S.
- Other political affiliations: Democrat

William Quin Davern (June 24, 1829 – June 30, 1913) was an Irish American politician and farmer who served a single term in the Minnesota Legislature. Davern's home in Saint Paul, Minnesota, the William and Catherine Davern Farm House, is listed on the National Register of Historic Places.

== Early life and education ==
Davern was born on June 24, 1829 in the village of Lismorahaun in County Clare, Ireland.^{:257} Davern attended national school in Ireland before emigrating to the United States 1848.^{:257}

== Career ==
Davern briefly lived in New York, Massachusetts, and Illinois, before moving to Minnesota Territory in 1849 and settling in Saint Paul.^{:257} While in Minnesota Davern worked in the lumber industry in the nearby settlement of St. Anthony, Minnesota.^{:257} Davern settled in Reserve Township near Saint Paul where he claimed 160 acres of land.^{:14} Reserve Township was later annexed by the city of Saint Paul in 1887 and is currently part of the Highland Park neighborhood.^{:18} In 1878, Davern purchase Pike Island from Franklin Steele.:257

== Political career ==
Davern later settled in Reserve Township^{:257} where he served on the townships municipal council in 1858 and again from 1866 to 1867. Davern also served as a county commissioner for Ramsey County from 1858 to 1859.^{:460} Davern was elected to the Minnesota House of Representatives on October 13, 1857 to represent Minnesota's 2nd House district in the 1st Minnesota Legislature.^{:461} During his term in the Minnesota Legislature Davern was a member of the supplies and expenditures committee. During his term in the Minnesota Legislature Davern was a member of the Minnesota Democratic Party.^{:382}

== Personal life ==
Davern was married twice. In 1856, he married Ann Morony of Ireland; she died in 1859.^{:257} Davern's second wife was Catherine Ryan whom he married in 1861; together they had eight children.^{:257} Davern was Catholic.

== Death and legacy ==
Davern died on June 30, 1913, in Saint Paul. Davern is buried in Calvary Cemetery in Saint Paul.

Davern's 1862 home, the William and Catherine Davern Farm House, located at 1173 Davern Street South, was added to the National Register of Historic Places on October 6, 1983.^{:181}
