= Michael Cummings (Minnesota politician) =

American politician

- Ambrotype of Cummings c. 1858

6th Chief of the Saint Paul Police Department
- In office 1863–1864
- Preceded by: James Gooding
- Succeeded by: John R. Cleveland

Member of the Minnesota House of Representatives from the 18th district
- In office December 2, 1857 – December 6, 1859 Serving with Henry Poehler and John H. Stevens
- Governor: Samuel Medary; Henry Hastings Sibley

Personal details
- Born: 1827 Ireland
- Died: October 21, 1896 (aged 68–69) Saint Paul, Minnesota, U.S.
- Resting place: Calvary Cemetery
- Other political affiliations: Democrat
- Occupation: Stonemason, politician, police chief

Michael Cummings Jr. (c. 1827 – October 21, 1896), often abbreviated as M. Cummings, was an Irish-American politician, city councilor, and law enforcement officer. During his career Cummings served a single term in the Minnesota House of Representatives and later served as the sixth chief of police of the Saint Paul Police Department.

== Early life ==
Cummings was born around 1827 in Ireland. Cummings moved to Minnesota Territory in 1850 and settled in Saint Paul, Minnesota. While in Minnesota Cummings worked in the stonemasonry trade, Cummings is noted for building the first limestone house in Saint Paul in 1850.

== Career ==
Cummings was elected as the city marshal of Saint Paul in 1851. On October 12, 1852, Cummings campaigned unsuccessfully as a Democratic representative for the Minnesota Territorial Legislature. Cummings lost to representatives Louis M. Oliver, William Noot, William Pitt Murray, and Bushrod W. Lott.

Cummings was elected to serve in the Minnesota House of Representatives on October 13, 1857, representing the 18th House district (McLeod, Renville, and Sibley Counties). Cummings served alongside Henry Poehler and John H. Stevens as representatives of the 18th House district in the 1st Minnesota Legislature. During his term in the Minnesota House Cummings was a member of the harbors committee.

On April 4, 1858, Cummings ran in the Saint Paul city election for the position of city treasurer, Cummings lost to Daniel Rohrer. From 1862 to 1865 Cummings held the municipal office of Market Master of Saint Paul. Cummings served as the chief of police for the Saint Paul Police Department from 1863 to 1864. Cummings also served as alderman of Saint Paul's second ward in the Saint Paul City Council from 1868 to 1873.

== Later life and death ==
Cummings was prosecuted and convicted for electoral fraud for "unlawfully attempting to corrupt the ballot box" during the November 1870 city election. Cummings was prosecuted by city attorney Willis A. Gorman and defended by local lawyers. Following his conviction Cummings was removed from the Saint Paul city council by a unanimous vote.

Cummings died on October 21, 1896, in Saint Paul.
