= George H. Keith =

American physician and politician (1825–1882)

- Keith c. 1858

Postmaster of Minneapolis
- In office April 15, 1871 – June 15, 1882
- Appointed by: Ulysses S. Grant
- Governor: Horace Austin; Cushman K. Davis; John S. Pillsbury
- Preceded by: Cyrus Aldrich
- Succeeded by: Orlo M. Laraway

Member of the Minnesota House of Representatives from the 4th District
- In office December 2, 1857 – December 6, 1859 Serving with: William S. Chowen; Reuben B. Gibson; James B. Hinkley
- Governor: Samuel Medary; Henry Hastings Sibley

Personal details
- Born: George Hackett Keith; May 4, 1825 Randolph, Vermont, U.S.
- Died: June 15, 1882 (aged 57) Minneapolis, Minnesota, U.S.
- Resting place: Lakewood Cemetery; Minneapolis, Minnesota, U.S.
- Other political affiliations: Whig; Republican
- Education: Kimball Union Academy; Vermont Medical College (1852)

Military service
- Allegiance: United States of America
- Branch/service: Union Army
- Years of service: 1862–1865
- Rank: Captain (Surgeon)
- Commands: 2nd Military District of Minnesota
- Battles/wars: American Civil War; Dakota War of 1862

George Hackett Keith (May 4, 1825 – June 15, 1882) was an American physician, politician, and soldier who served a single term in the Minnesota Legislature and was thrice appointed by President of the United States, Ulysses S. Grant as the postmaster of Minneapolis.

== Early life and education ==
Keith was born on May 4, 1825, in Randolph, Vermont, he was the son of Bethuel Keith and Mary Keith (née Pearson).^{:245} Keith was educated in local district schools until the age of sixteen when he left to study at the Kimball Union Academy in Meriden, New Hampshire where he studied for four years and worked as a teacher.^{:245}

Keith later moved to Indianapolis, Indiana where he worked as a teacher for a private school, he was later appointed as the superintendent of the preparatory department at Franklin College before moving to Dover, New Hampshire and studying medicine under his brother.^{:246} Keith continued to study medicine until 1852 when he graduated from the Vermont Medical College in Woodstock, Vermont, afterwards moving to New York to begin a medical practice.^{:246}

== Medical career ==
Keith briefly worked in New York for one year before moving to Minnesota Territory in 1855 and settling in Minneapolis.^{:246} Keith's primary medical focus was in dentistry.^{:246} Keith would practice medicine in Minneapolis for the majority of his career.^{:246} Beginning on November 1, 1865, Keith entered a partnership in practicing dentistry with Dr. Abner Bausman of Minneapolis, which continued until Keith's retirement in 1870.^{:939}

== Political career ==
Keith began his political career in 1857 when he campaigned for a seat in the Minnesota House of Representatives representing Minnesota's 4th House district. At the time the district included Hennepin County, Minnesota. Keith won the October 13, 1857 election and served during the 1st Minnesota Legislature, a protracted session, from December 2, 1857, to December 6, 1859. During his term Keith was a member of the banks committee.

Beginning in 1871 Keith was appointed by President of the United States, Ulysses S. Grant as the postmaster of Minneapolis and was reappointed in 1875.^{:246} Keith served three terms as the postmaster of Minneapolis.^{:275} According to the United States Postal Service, Keith served from April 15, 1871, until his death on June 15, 1882.

While the Minnesota Legislative Reference Library does not list Keith's political affiliation during his career, the book The United States Biographical Dictionary and Portrait Gallery of Eminent and Self-Made Men. Minnesota Volume, states that Keith was "originally a Whig, and afterward a strong Republican".^{:246}

== Military service ==
Keith in a Union Army officers uniform c. 1862

During the Dakota War of 1862 Keith served in the Union Army as a surgeon and was part of the relief force which relieved the besieged troops at Fort Abercrombie.^{:246} Keith was later appointed in 1863 as the provost marshal of Minnesota's 2nd Military District, a position which he held until the end of the war.^{:246}

== Later life and death ==
During his later life Keith was the president of the Bristol Silver Mining Company.

Keith died on June 15, 1882, in Minneapolis, he is buried in Lakewood Cemetery.

== Personal life ==
During his lifetime Keith had a total of two wives and three children.^{:247} Keith's first wife was Anna Judson, whom he married on July 2, 1851, in Indianapolis, Anna died on August 28, 1862.^{:247} Keith's second wife was Henrietta P. Jewett, whom he married on June 30, 1866.^{:247}

In his personal life Keith was an advocate of the temperance movement and was the president of the Hennepin County Temperance League.^{:359} Keith was an active Freemason and was part of the Knights Templar.^{:246}
