= John L. Scofield =

American politician and physician

- Ambrotype of Scofield c. 1858

Member of the Minnesota House of Representatives from the 5th district
- In office December 2, 1857 – December 6, 1859 Serving with Warren Vertress and John H. Parker
- Governor: Samuel Medary; Henry Hastings Sibley

Personal details
- Born: July 23, 1811 Stamford, Connecticut, U.S.
- Died: July 23, 1892 (aged 81) Northfield, Minnesota, U.S.
- Education: University of Pennsylvania (1832)

Military service
- Allegiance: United States of America
- Branch/service: Union army
- Battles/wars: American Civil War

John L. Scofield (July 23, 1811 – July 23, 1892) was an American physician, politician, and early citizen of Northfield, Minnesota who served a single term in the Minnesota House of Representatives.

== Early life and education ==
Scofield was born on July 23, 1811, in Stamford, Connecticut. Scofield was educated at the University of Pennsylvania which he graduated from in 1832 before beginning his own medical practice in New York.

== Career ==
Scofield briefly practiced medicine in Jacksonville, Florida before moving to Raymond, Wisconsin. From 1849 to 1850, Scofield lived in California before moving back to Wisconsin. In 1856 Scofield moved to Minnesota Territory and settled in Northfield in Rice County. While living in Northfield, Scofield was the first and only doctor in the region for several years. Scofield also served as a supplier to the Methodist Episcopal mission at the Cannon River.

=== Political career ===
Scofield was elected to serve in the Minnesota House of Representatives on October 13, 1857, representing Minnesota's 5th House district in the 1st Minnesota Legislature. During Scofield's term he served as the chairman of the state library committee.

=== Military service ===
During the American Civil War Scofield served as a surgeon in the Union army.

== Later life and death ==
Following his military service Scofield continued to live in Northfield. Scofield was later a trustee of Carleton College in Northfield.

Scofield died on his 81st birthday on July 23, 1892, in Northfield.

== Personal life ==
Scofield was married to Betsey A. Dibble on July 24, 1836, together they had four children.
