= Amander H. Bartlett =

American lawyer and politician

- Bartlett c. 1858

Probate Judge of Freeborn County, Minnesota
- In office 1862–1866

Member of the Minnesota House of Representatives from the 14th District
- In office December 2, 1857 – December 6, 1859

Personal details
- Born: September 28, 1829 Cattaraugus County, New York, U.S.
- Died: April 24, 1902 (aged 72) Glenville, Minnesota, U.S.
- Other political affiliations: Republican

Amander H. Bartlett (September 28, 1829 – April 24, 1902) was an American lawyer, politician, and educator who platted the city of Shell Rock, now Glenville, Minnesota, in 1856. Bartlett later served a single term in the Minnesota House of Representatives during the 1st Minnesota Legislature.

== Early life and career ==
Bartlett was born on September 28, 1829, in Cattaraugus County, New York.^{:780} Bartlett was educated in New York and became a schoolteacher at the age of sixteen.^{:780} In 1852 Bartlett moved to California^{:780} where he stayed until returning to New York in 1854.

Bartlett eventually moved to Minnesota Territory and on July 11, 1856, settled in Freeborn County, Bartlett platted the city of Shell Rock, now Glenville, Minnesota.^{:430,780} Bartlett served as the deputy postmaster of Shell Rock.^{:233} While in Shell Rock, Bartlett was admitted to the bar in 1860 to practice law^{:187} and owned a sawmill and real estate company.^{:780} In Glenville's early history Bartlett was the first and only lawyer in the city.^{:365}

== Political career ==
On October 13, 1857, Bartlett was elected to serve in the Minnesota House of Representatives representing Minnesota's 14th House district. Other representatives from the 14th House district included James Wakefield and William N. Dunham. At the time the district included Faribault County and Freeborn County. Bartlett served during the 1st Minnesota Legislature from December 2, 1857, to December 6, 1859. During his term Bartlett was a member of the Harbors Committee. Bartlett was a member of the Republican Party of Minnesota.

Bartlett was later elected as the judge of the Freeborn County probate court from 1862 to 1866.^{:102} In 1898 when Glenville was formally incorporated, Bartlett was elected as justice of the peace.^{:364}

== Personal life and death ==
Bartlett was married to Ann D. Peet; together they had four children.^{:780} Bartlett died on April 24, 1902, in Glenville.^{:187}
