= George E. Skinner =

American businessman and politician (1825 – 1895)

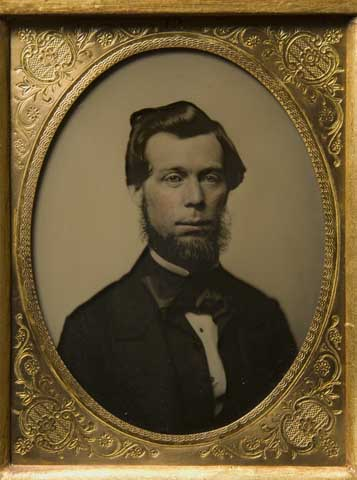
- Skinner c. 1857

Postmaster of Faribault, Minnesota
- In office 1857–1861
- Appointed by: James Buchanan

Member of the Minnesota Senate from the 5th District
- In office December 2, 1857 – December 5, 1859
- Governor: Samuel Medary; Henry Hastings Sibley
- Preceded by: Position established
- Succeeded by: Michael Cook

Personal details
- Born: George Eldridge Skinner; April 8, 1825 Le Roy, New York, U.S.
- Died: September 21, 1895 (aged 70) Saint Paul, Minnesota, U.S.
- Other political affiliations: Democrat
- Occupation: Lawyer, railroad land commissioner, politician, deaf education advocate

George Eldridge Skinner (April 8, 1825 – September 21, 1895) was an American businessman, lawyer, and politician who served a single term in the Minnesota Senate. As an early advocate of deaf education, Skinner campaigned for the construction of the Minnesota State Academy for the Deaf in Faribault, Minnesota, where he later served as the institution's director.

== Early life and education ==
Skinner was born on April 8, 1825 in Le Roy, New York, he was the son of Samuel Skinner, an attorney, and Delia Skinner (née Colton).^{:284} Skinner was educated at the Le Roy seminary before reading law under his father.^{:284} Skinner was admitted to the bar in Batavia, New York in 1847.^{:284}

== Career ==
=== Early career ===
In 1847 Skinner moved to Hazel Green, Wisconsin where he worked for two years as a lawyer.^{:284} While in Hazel Green Skinner was a founding member of the Sinsinawa Lodge, No. 16 of the Independent Order of Odd Fellows.^{:754} In 1849 Skinner took part in the California gold rush and mined for two years in California with minor success.^{:284} Following the gold rush, Skinner worked in the lumber industry in Buffalo, New York and Tennessee before moving to the city of Faribault in Minnesota Territory in 1856.^{:284}

=== Railroad commissioner ===
While in Minnesota Skinner became a railroad agent for the Chicago, Milwaukee, and St. Paul Railroad and established various right of way railroad lines in the railroad's Minnesota and Iowa divisions.^{:285} Skinner later served as the land commissioner of the Chicago, Milwaukee, and St. Paul Railroad, Minnesota Central Railway, and the Hastings and Dakota Railway companies.^{:285}

=== Other business ventures ===
In 1874 Skinner was a co-owner of the Walcott Mills Company in Walcott Township. In 1875 Skinner was one of the three directors for the Taopi Mills Company in Taopi, Minnesota.^{:455} Skinner served as the vice president of the Citizens' National Bank of Faribault and as the director of the First National Bank of Austin, Minnesota.^{:285}^{:455}

== Political career ==
Skinner was politically appointed as the postmaster of Faribault in 1857 by President of the United States James Buchanan, he served as postmaster until 1861.^{:285} Skinner was later elected to the Minnesota Senate on October 13, 1857 representing Minnesota's 5th Senate district. Minnesota's 5th Senate district at the time included Rice County, Minnesota. Skinner served during the 1st Minnesota Legislature from December 2, 1857 to December 6, 1859. During his term Skinner was a member of the internal improvements and judiciary committees, and was the chair of the banks committee. Skinner was a member of the Minnesota Democratic Party.^{:285} Skinner was later a Democratic delegate from Minnesota during both the 1872 Democratic National Convention in Baltimore, and the 1876 Democratic National Conventionin St. Louis.^{:285}

=== Deaf and blind education ===
During his political career Skinner was an advocate of the use of American Sign Language and promoted the education of deaf and visually impaired children, as well as children with learning disabilities in Minnesota.^{:3} During his term in the Minnesota Senate, Skinner campaigned for the establishment of the Minnesota State Academy for the Deaf.^{:3} Skinner's campaigning was continued by John M. Berry during the 5th Minnesota Legislature and was eventually approved by the Legislature on March 4, 1863 and built in Faribault.^{:3} The academy provided vocational classes, athletic programs, student-led organizations, and libraries to deaf and blind children. Skinner would serve as one of the academy's directors and board members from 1876 until his death in 1895.

== Death ==
Skinner died on September 21, 1895 in Saint Paul, Minnesota. Skinner was originally buried in Oakland Cemetery before being reinterred in Faribault.

== Personal life ==
Skinner was married to Mary Elizabeth Gibson on October 12, 1852 in Buffalo, New York, together they had two children, Elizabeth and James.^{:285} Skinner's son, James Henry Skinner, built the 15 room Skinner Mansion at 385 Portland Avenue in Saint Paul near Summit Avenue in Saint Paul. Skinner was a follower of Congregationalist Christianity,^{:285} he was later a member of the House of Hope Presbyterian Church.
