= John Le Blond =

American politician and physician

- Ambrotype of Le Blond c. 1858

Member of the Minnesota House of Representatives from the 13th district
- In office January 8, 1861 – January 6, 1862

Member of the Minnesota House of Representatives from the 10th district
- In office December 2, 1857 – December 6, 1859 Serving with Daniel F. Willson and Edmund Mackintire

Personal details
- Born: John Byers Le Blond; February 27, 1825 Ohio, U.S.
- Died: July 24, 1895 (aged 70) Sioux Falls, South Dakota, U.S.
- Relations: Francis Celeste Le Blond (brother)
- Education: Western Reserve College

Military service
- Allegiance: United States of America
- Branch/service: Union Army
- Years of service: 1861–1865
- Rank: Major (surgeon)
- Unit: 1st Minnesota Infantry Regiment; 1st Minnesota Infantry Battalion
- Battles/wars: American Civil War

John Byers Le Blond (February 27, 1825 – July 24, 1895), also known as J.B. Le Blond, was an American physician, soldier, and politician who served two nonconsecutive terms in the Minnesota Legislature.

== Early life and education ==
Le Blond was born on February 27, 1825, in Ohio. Le Blond studied medicine under Dr. J.M. Smith at Case Western Reserve University (then the Western Reserve College) in Cleveland. After practicing medicine in Ohio, Le Blond moved to Minnesota Territory in 1856, and settled in Brownsville, Minnesota.

== Political career ==
Le Blond was elected to the Minnesota House of Representatives on October 13, 1857, representing the 10th House district.^{:790}^{:307} Le Blond served during the 1st Minnesota Legislature, during his first term he was the chairman of the enrolled bills committee and was a member of the federal relations committee.

Le Blond was reelected to the Minnesota House on November 6, 1860, representing the 13th House district.^{:790}^{:307} Le Blond served during the 3rd Minnesota Legislature, during his second term Le Blond was a member of the following committees; elections, military affairs, rules and joint rules, and ways and means.

Le Blond also served as a county superintendent of Houston County, Minnesota.^{:318}

== Military service ==
During the American Civil War Le Blond enlisted in the Union army and served as a surgeon in the 1st Minnesota Infantry Regiment.^{:322} Le Blond was later transferred to the 1st Minnesota Infantry Battalion where he continued to serve as a surgeon until mustering out of service in 1865.

== Later life and death ==
Le Blond moved to Sioux Falls, South Dakota in 1880, he later worked as a surgeon for various railroads including both the Milwaukee Railroad and the Great Northern Railway.

Le Blond died on July 24, 1895, in Sioux Falls.
