= Elijah T. Mixer =

American politician and businessman (1824–1904)

- Mixer c. 1858

Member of the Minnesota Senate from the 18th District
- In office December 2, 1857 – December 6, 1859
- Governor: Samuel Medary

Personal details
- Born: January 29, 1824 Unionville, Ohio, U.S.
- Died: May 5, 1904 (aged 80) Minneapolis, Minnesota, U.S.
- Resting place: Lakewood Cemetery

Elijah T. Mixer (January 29, 1824 – May 5, 1904) was an American politician, educator, and businessman who served a farming instructor to Native Americans in Minnesota. Mixer served a single term in the Minnesota Senate from 1857 to 1859 before working for the Saint Paul and Pacific Railroad.

== Early life ==
Mixer was born in Unionville, Ohio on January 29, 1824. He was the son of Phineas Mixer Jr. and Dorcas Mixer (née Woodworth).

== Politics ==
In 1848 Mixer was appointed by President of the United States James K. Polk to serve as a farming instructor and Indian agent to the Ho-Chunk living in Minnesota Territory in Winnebago, Minnesota. Mixer first moved to Minnesota Territory in 1849 and settled in Henderson, Minnesota.

Mixer campaigned for a position in the Minnesota Legislature as a member of the Minnesota Senate in 1857. Mixer won the election on October 13, 1857 as a representative of Minnesota's 18th Senate district. At the time the district consisted of Sibley County, McLeod County, and Renville County. Mixer served during the 1st Minnesota Legislature from December 2, 1857 to December 6, 1859. During his term Mixer served on the Elections, Roads and Bridges, State Affairs, and State Prison Committees.

== Railroad career ==
Following his term in the Minnesota Senate, Mixer worked as a railroad foreman for the Saint Paul and Pacific Railroad. Mix was later a foreman for the Great Northern Railway following its consolidation with the Saint Paul Pacific Railroad in 1879 under James J. Hill.

== Death ==
Mixer died on May 5, 1904 in Minneapolis; he is buried in Lakewood Cemetery.
