= Robert Masters =

Robert Masters may refer to:

- Robert C. Masters, Minnesota politician
- Robert Masters (New Zealand politician) (1879–1967)
- Robert Masters (historian) (1713–1798), English clergyman and academic, historian of Corpus Christi College, Cambridge
- Robert Masters (Wisconsin pioneer) (c. 1787–1867), American sailor, politician, and pioneer
