= Samuel Lord (politician) =

American lawyer and politician (1831–1880)

- Lord c. 1858

Judge of Minnesota's 5th Judicial District
- In office 1872–1880

Member of the Minnesota Senate from the 15th District
- In office January 2, 1866–January 6, 1868; January 4, 1870–January 1, 1872

Member of the Minnesota House of Representatives from the 8th District
- In office December 2, 1857 – December 6, 1859

Personal details
- Born: July 26, 1831 Meadville, Pennsylvania, U.S.
- Died: February 12, 1880 (aged 48) Mantorville, Minnesota, U.S.

Samuel "Sam" Lord Sr. (July 26, 1831 – February 12, 1880) was an American lawyer, judge, surveyor, and politician who served five nonconsecutive terms in the Minnesota Legislature between 1857 and 1872. Lord presided over the trial and imprisonment of several members of the James–Younger Gang following their 1876 bank robbery in Northfield, Minnesota.

== Early life ==
Lord was born in Meadville, Pennsylvania on July 26, 1831 to parents Enoch Lord and Eleanor Lord (née Warren). Lord was a descendant of Thomas Lord, the founder of Hartford, Connecticut. Lord read law in Pennsylvania before moving to Minnesota Territory in 1856 and settling in Marion, Minnesota.

== Career ==
Lord worked primarily as a lawyer and judge while living in Minnesota, Lord was also trained in surveying land. In 1859 Lord was the head of the bar association of Olmsted County.^{:852} In 1861 Lord was elected as the probate judge of Olmsted County, however, he moved back to Pennsylvania during the Pennsylvania oil rush to work in the oil industry.^{:848} Lord later moved back to Minnesota and continued to work in the field of law.

In 1876 Lord was responsible for overseeing the trail of the James–Younger Gang following their bank robbery in Northfield, Minnesota. Lord originally recommended capital punishment for the three Younger brothers, however, they were instead sentenced to life imprisonment at the Stillwater Prison in Stillwater, Minnesota.

== Politics ==
Lord was a career politician while living in Minnesota, he served in five total legislative sessions during his career which spanned from 1857 to 1871. Lord also served in locally elected offices including serving as the judge of Olmstead county's probate court and as a judicial district judge for Minnesota's 5th Judicial District.^{:847}

Lord was first elected to serve in the Minnesota Legislature on October 13, 1857 as a member of the Minnesota House of Representatives representing Minnesota's 8th House district which included Olmsted County, Minnesota. Lord served in the 1st Minnesota Legislature from December 2, 1857 to December 6, 1859. During his term Lord was a member of the Incorporations Committee.

Lord was later elected to serve in the Minnesota Senate on November 7, 1865 representing Minnesota's 15th Senate district. Lord served from January 2, 1866 to January 6, 1868 in the 8th Minnesota Legislature and the 9th Minnesota Legislature as a member of the Minnesota Senate. Lord would later serve in the Minnesota Senate during the 12th Minnesota Legislature and 13th Minnesota Legislature from January 4, 1870 to January 1, 1872.

== Death ==
Lord died on February 12, 1880 in Mantorville, Minnesota.

== Personal life ==
Lord was married to Louisa Maria Compton. Lord was the father of Minnesota politician Samuel Lord Jr. (1859–1925).
