= John S. Watrous =

American politician (died 1897)

1st Speaker of the Minnesota House of Representatives
- In office December 2, 1857 – March 12, 1858
- Preceded by: Joseph W. Furber (Territorial)
- Succeeded by: George Bradley

Member of the Minnesota House of Representatives from the 26th district
- In office December 2, 1857 – December 6, 1859
- Preceded by: Position established
- Succeeded by: William Nettleton

Member of the Wisconsin State Assembly from the St. Croix–La Pointe district
- In office January 7, 1850 – January 6, 1851
- Preceded by: Joseph Bowron
- Succeeded by: John O. Henning

Personal details
- Born: Ashtabula, Ohio, U.S.
- Died: 1897 California, U.S.
- Party: Democratic

John S. Watrous (died 1897) was a politician from Minnesota, and a former member of the Minnesota House of Representatives, representing St. Louis County, Minnesota. Watrous was the first Speaker of the Minnesota House of Representatives, a position he held from the convention of the 1st Minnesota Legislature in December 1857, until the Speaker's chair was declared vacant on March 12, 1858, due to a prolonged absence during which he was handling private business.

Watrous died in 1897.

Minnesota Legislators Past & Present lists Watrous' party affiliation as "Not Available," while the Minnesota Legislative Reference Library's list of Speakers of the House of Representatives lists "R?," indicating that the MLRL does not know what Watrous' party affiliation was, and is merely guessing that he might have been a Republican; on the other hand, the Journal of the House of Representatives for the 1st Session shows that Watrous was elected Speaker in a party-line vote by a majority Democratic House of Representatives, with the Democratic majority voting for him and the Republican minority voting for James Beach Wakefield, and Watrous was, in 1859, given a federal civil service appointment by the Buchanan Administration at a time when patronage was the rule for civil service appointments

Wisconsin State Assembly
| Preceded by Joseph Bowron | Member of the Wisconsin State Assembly from the St. Croix–La Pointe district January 7, 1850 – January 6, 1851 | Succeeded by John O. Henning |
Minnesota House of Representatives
| State government established | Member of the Minnesota House of Representatives from the 26th district December 2, 1857 – December 6, 1859 | Succeeded by William Nettleton |
| Preceded by Joseph W. Furber (Territorial) | Speaker of the Minnesota House of Representatives; December 2, 1857 – March 12, 1858 | Succeeded by George Bradley |
