= George W. Campbell (Minnesota politician) =

Minnesota politician (1810–1887)

- Campbell c. 1857

Member of the Minnesota House of Representatives from the 1st District
- In office December 2, 1857 – December 6, 1859 Serving with Robert Simpson and James R.M. Gaskill

Personal details
- Born: 1810 Canton, New York, U.S.
- Died: March 13, 1887 (aged 76–77) Minnesota, U.S.

George W. Campbell (c. 1810 – March 13, 1887) was an American politician who served a single term in the Minnesota Legislature. Campbell was a founding citizen of Denmark Township in Washington County, Minnesota.

== Early life ==
Campbell was born around 1810 in Canton, New York. Campbell moved to Minnesota Territory in 1848 and settled in Point Douglas, Minnesota where he worked in the lumber trade and was a farmer.

== Politics ==
Campbell was the town clerk for Denmark Township in Washington County.^{:354} Campbell was later a local township officer and the township supervisor intermittently between 1859 and 1866.^{:354}

Campbell was elected to the Minnesota House of Representatives on October 13, 1857 and served in the 1st Minnesota Legislature representing Minnesota's 1st House of Representatives district. At the time the district included only Washington County. During his term Campbell was a member of the printing committee.

== Death ==
Campbell died on March 13, 1887.
