= Warren Vertress =

American politician (1827–1898)

Member of the Minnesota House of Representatives from the 5th district
- In office December 2, 1857 – December 6, 1859 Serving with John H. Parker, John L. Scofield

Personal details
- Born: June 25, 1827 Morgan County, Indiana, U.S.
- Died: June 14, 1898 (aged 70)
- Occupation: Politician

Warren Vertress (June 25, 1827 – June 14, 1898) was an American politician who served in the Minnesota House of Representatives from 1857 to 1859, representing the 5th legislative district of Minnesota in the 1st Minnesota Legislature.

== Early life ==
Vertress was born in Morgan County, Indiana, on June 25, 1827.

== Career ==
Vertress served in the Minnesota House of Representatives from 1857 to 1859, representing the 5th legislative district of Minnesota in the 1st Minnesota Legislature.

During his time in office, Vertress served on the Mines and Minerals committee.

Vertress's time in office began on December 2, 1857, (Note: Vertress was sworn in on December 3, 1857.) and concluded on December 6, 1859. His district included representation for Rice County.

Vertress represented Rice County alongside John H. Parker and John L. Scofield.

== Personal life and death ==
Vertress resided in Cannon City, Minnesota. He died at the age of 70 on June 14, 1898.

== Notes ==
Minnesota House of Representatives
Preceded by —	Member of the Minnesota House of Representatives from the 5th district 1857–1859; Served alongside: John H. Parker, John L. Scofield	Succeeded by —
