= Basil Moreland =

American politician

- Moreland c. 1858

Postmaster of Mankato, Minnesota
- In office 1856–1860

Member of the Minnesota Senate from the 16th District
- In office December 2, 1857 – December 6, 1859

Sheriff of Blue Earth County, Minnesota
- In office August 27, 1853 – September 4, 1854

Personal details
- Born: 1829 Belmore, Ohio U.S.
- Died: May 26, 1910 (aged 80–81) Los Angeles, California, U.S.
- Resting place: Calvary Cemetery

Basil Moreland (c. 1829 – May 26, 1910) was an American businessman, surveyor, politician, and early citizen of Mankato, Minnesota.

== Early life ==
Moreland was born around 1830 in Belmore, Ohio. Moreland arrived in Minnesota Territory on April 16, 1853^{:141}^{:47} and in March 1854 settled on 160 acres of unsurveyed public land on the Blue Earth River near Rapidan, Minnesota.^{:69,281} The land Moreland settled on was on the same territory as the Indian reservation constructed for the Ho-Chunk living in Minnesota.^{:69} Moreland was later evicted by the territorial government in 1856 for living on public land and he settled in Mankato, Minnesota.^{:69} Moreland was never originally compensated for his lost property.

== Political career ==
Moreland's first political office was his election as the sheriff of Blue Earth County on August 27, 1853,^{:48} Moreland would resign as sheriff a year later on September 4, 1854.^{:533} Moreland was also elected as the treasurer of Blue Earth County on September 12, 1853,^{:48} Moreland served twice as the County Surveyor of Blue Earth County in 1856 and 1857.^{:305} From 1856 to 1860 Moreland served as the postmaster of Mankato.^{:47}

=== Minnesota Senate ===
In 1857 Moreland campaigned for a seat in the Minnesota Legislature as a representative of Minnesota's 16th Senate District which included Blue Earth County and Le Sueur County, Minnesota.^{:302} Moreland won the election on October 13, 1857, and would serve a single term in the 1st Minnesota Legislature from December 2, 1857, to December 6, 1859. During his term Moreland was the chairman of the Credentials Committee and Indian Affairs Committee and was a member of the Engrossments Committee and the Public Lands Committee.

During his term Moreland was responsible for incorporating the Minnesota and Northwestern Railroad in 1857 alongside William R. McMahan, Matthew Thompson, Francis Baasen, and William Pfaender.^{:170}

== Later life ==
Following his term in the Minnesota Senate, Moreland continued to live and work in and around Mankato. In 1865 Moreland and W.F Lewis built a sawmill on the Cobb River.^{:224}

In 1894 United States representative James McCleary introduced a bill to the 53rd United States Congress in order to compensate Moreland for his property he was evicted from in 1854, Moreland was compensated $2,200 for his lost property.

Moreland died on May 26, 1910, at the age of 81 in Los Angeles, California, he is buried in Calvary Cemetery.
