= Saint Paul Police Department =

Police force in Minnesota, United States

Coordinates: 44°57′23″N 93°5′9″W

- Abbreviation: SPPD
- Motto: Service with purpose

Agency overview
- Formed: 1854

Jurisdictional structure
- Operations jurisdiction: Saint Paul, Minnesota, USA
- Map of Saint Paul Police Department's jurisdiction
- Area: 56.2 square miles (146 km^{2})
- Population: 285,068 (2010)
- General nature: Local civilian police

Operational structure
- Headquarters: 367 Grove St. Saint Paul, Minnesota
- Police Officers: 575
- Civilians: ~300
- Agency executive: Axel Henry, Chief of Police
- Districts: List: Central; Eastern; Western

Website
- Saint Paul Police Department

The Saint Paul Police Department (SPPD) is the main law enforcement agency with jurisdiction over the City of Saint Paul, Minnesota, United States. It was established in 1854, making it the oldest police organization in the state. In the beginning the men did not have a stationhouse. Prisoners were taken to the Fort Snelling brig until the city built a jail. The SPPD is the second largest law enforcement agency in Minnesota, after the Minneapolis Police Department. The department consists of 575 sworn officers and 200 non-sworn officials. The current Chief of Police is Axel Henry. He is the 42nd chief in the history of the St. Paul Police Department and was sworn in November 2022.

== History ==
In 1920 St. Paul Councilman and Public Safety Commissioner Aloysius Smith, requested that the St. Paul Police start a Police program for the youth. Sergeant Frank Hetznecke was selected to create the program. In its first year, 750 students signed up for the training program and in February 1921 the first student monitored crossing took place with students from Cathedral school on Kellogg Blvd. Sergeant Hetznecke is credited with introducing the Sam Browne belt and badge that became synonymous with school patrol across the country and administering St. Paul's program for 30 years.

During the Prohibition era, the department was remarkably corrupt. In 1936, the chief, Thomas Brown was fired after an investigation showed he had protected criminals including the Dillinger and the Barker-Karpis gangs.

An arrest outside of a bar on 26 September 2010 is the subject of a lawsuit that claims excessive force. In March 2011, the elite Gang Strike Force was disestablished when a state audit could not account for 13 vehicles and over $18,000 in cash the unit had seized. The auditor's report indicated that Officer Ron Ryan had sold property his detail had retained. Press reports indicated the unit used money taken from gang members to attend a 2009 professional conference held in Hawaii. The SPPD had two prominent incidents of misconduct in relation to their dogs in 2016 and 2017.

== Command structure ==
Title	Insignia
Chief of Police	
Assistant Chief of Police	
Deputy Chief of Police	
District Chief of District	
Senior Commander	
Commander	
Sergeant (see note)	
Police Officer	

NOTE: By contract, all investigators (detectives) hold the rank of sergeant.

- The time that a uniformed sergeant holds this rank is shown by arcs below the chevrons, one for each 5 years after promotion. After three are obtained the next 5 year periods give progressively a diamond and then a star in the field between the arcs and chevrons. Although this is analogous to the uniforms of the United States Army, no additional command authority is granted.

== List of Chief of Police ==
Name	Dates
William R. Miller	1854-1858
John W. Crosby	1858-1859
John O'Gorman	1859-1861
Horace H. Western	1861
James Gooding	1861-1863
Michael Cummings	1863-1864
John R. Cleveland	1864-1865
George Turnbull	1865-1866
John Jones	1866-1867
James P. McIlrath	1867-1870
Luther J. Eddy	1870-1872
James P. McIlrath	1872-1874
James King	1875-1878
Charles Weber Jr.	1875-1878
John Clark	1883-1892
Albert Garvin	1892-1894
John Clark	1894-1896
Michael N. Goss	1896-1900
Parker L. Getchell	1900
John J. O'Connor	1900-1912
Frederick M. Catlin	1912
Martin J. Flanagan	1912-1913
Michael Gebhardt	1913-1914 (Acting)
John J. O'Connor	1914-1920
Thomas E. Campbell	1920-1921
Henry J. Crepeau	1921-1922
Michael Gebhardt	1922
Frank W. Sommer	1922-1923
Michael Gebhardt	1923-1924
Edward J. Murnane	1924-1930
Thomas E. Dahill	1930 (Acting)
Thomas A. Brown	1930-1932
Thomas E. Dahill	1932-1934
Frank R. Cullen	1934
Michael J. Culligan	1934-1935
Gustave H. Barfuss	1935
Charles W. Coulter	1935-1936
Clinton A. Hackert	1936-1943
Charles J. Tierney	1943-1952
Neal McMahon	1952-1954
Albert A. Anderson	1954-1955 (Acting)
William F. Proetz	1955-1961
Frank A. Schmidt	1960-1961 (Acting)
Lester McAuliffe	1961-1970
Robert LaBathe	1970 (Acting)
Richard H. Rowan	1970-1979
Robert LaBathe	1980
William W. McCutcheon	1980-1992
William Finney	1992-2004
John Harrington	2004-2010
Thomas E. Smith	2010-2016
Kathy Wuorinen	2016 (Interim)
Todd D. Axtell	2016-2022
Jeremy A. Ellison	2022 (Interim)
Axel C. Henry	2022-

== Department awards ==
The department has only issued medals / awards since 1971. The current medals are:

- Medal of Valor Class A
- Medal of Merit Class B
- Medal of Commendation
- Life Saving Award
- Chief's Award For Valor
- Chief's Award For Merit
- Chief's Award
- Officer of the Year
- Detective of the Year
- Professional Staff of the Year
- Volunteer of the Year (Added in 2026)

== Department size ==
Like most major cities, the city of St. Paul saw a population decline beginning in the late 1960s. However, the department continued to grow.

Year	City Population	Sworn Officers	Non-Sworn Law Enforcement Personnel
1849	910	4	
1858	7,000	11	
1863	10,401	10	
1871	20,030	19	
1888	133,156	160	
1900	163,065	195	
1920	234,698	357	
1930	271,606	358	
1940	287,736	345	
1950	311,329	368	26
1960	313,411	389	43
1970	309,980	463	69
1983	270,230	495	
1990	272,235	524	131
2000	287,151	547	211
2010	285,068	560	300
2013	290,770	630	350
2023	303,176	575	225

== See also ==
- List of law enforcement agencies in Minnesota
- Homer Van Meter
