= John N. Chase =

- Ambrotype of Chase c. 1857

Member of the Minnesota House of Representatives from the 22nd District
- In office December 2, 1857 – December 6, 1859
- Preceded by: Position established
- Succeeded by: Alex Kinkead

Personal details
- Born: 1835 Connecticut, U.S.
- Died: 1867 (aged 31–32) New Orleans, Louisiana, U.S.

Military service
- Allegiance: United States of America
- Branch/service: Union Army
- Years of service: 1861–1864
- Rank: Captain (Adjutant)
- Unit: 1st Minnesota Infantry Regiment
- Commands: Company H, 1st Minnesota Infantry Regiment
- Battles/wars: American Civil War

John N. Chase (1835 – 1867) was an American soldier and politician who served in the Minnesota Legislature.

== Early life ==
According to the 1866 Minnesota Adjutant General report, Chase was born around 1835, his birthplace is listed as Connecticut.^{:19} Chase moved to Minnesota Territory and settled in St. Vincent, Minnesota by 1857.

== Political career ==
Chase ran for political office in 1857 for a seat in the Minnesota House of Representatives, representing Minnesota's 22nd house district. At the time the 22nd House district included Cass County, Pembina County, and Todd County. Chase won the October 13, 1857 election and served in the 1st Minnesota Legislature. During his term Chase was a member of the towns and counties committee.

== Military service ==
Chase enlisted in the Union Army at the age of 26 in St. Anthony, Minnesota on October 22, 1861.^{:17} Chase was enrolled into the ranks of Company E of the 1st Minnesota Infantry Regiment as a First Lieutenant.^{:17} Chase was promoted to the rank of Captain of Company H on September 26, 1862, in order to replace Charles Powell Adams who was promoted to Major.^{:19} Chase later served as the 1st Minnesota's adjutant.^{:14}^{:204} Chase was discharged from service on May 4, 1864.^{:19}

== Death ==
According to The St. Cloud Journal, Chase died in 1867 in New Orleans, Louisiana from yellow fever.
