= Charles Rauch =

American politician (1811–1875)

- Rauch c. 1857

Member of the Minnesota House of Representatives from the 2nd District
- In office December 2, 1857 – December 6, 1859 Serving with John W. Crosby, William Q. Davern, William B. McGrorty, George L. Otis, and James Starkey

Personal details
- Born: January 28, 1811 Germany
- Died: April 4, 1875 (aged 64) Saint Paul, Minnesota, U.S.
- Resting place: Oakland Cemetery, Saint Paul, Minnesota, U.S.

Charles Rauch (January 28, 1811 – April 4, 1875) was an American politician who served on the Saint Paul City Council and served a single term in the Minnesota Legislature.

Rauch was born in 1811 in Germany. Rauch was the proprietor of the Apollo Hall saloon in Saint Paul.^{:363} In 1856 Rauch served a two year term on the Saint Paul city council as an alderman for Saint Paul's second ward.^{:364}^{:364}

Beginning in 1857 Rauch campaigned to serve in the Minnesota House of Representatives representing Minnesota's 2nd House district, at the time the district included only Ramsey County, Minnesota. Rauch won the October 13, 1857, election and served from December 2, 1857, to December 6, 1859, during the 1st Minnesota Legislature. During his term Rauch was a member of the Minnesota state prison committee. Rauch was a member of the Democratic party.^{:382}
