= Henry G. Bailly =

American businessman and politician

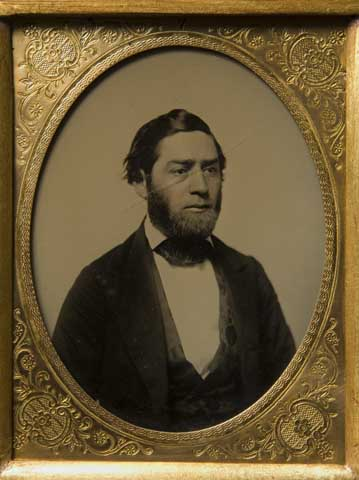
- Bailly as a State Senator

Member of the Minnesota Territorial Legislature
- Preceded by: Joseph Renshaw Brown

Member of the Minnesota Senate for the 3rd District
- In office December 2, 1857 – December 6, 1859 Serving with Dennis William Chauncey Dunwell
- Succeeded by: A.H. Norris; Eli Robinson

Personal details
- Born: October 29, 1828
- Died: January 7, 1865 (aged 36) Nashville, Tennessee, U.S.
- Resting place: Bellwood Cemetery
- Parent: Alexis Bailly

Henry G. Bailly (October 29, 1828 – January 7, 1865) was an early settler of Hastings, Minnesota who served in the 7th and 8th Minnesota Territorial Legislatures, as well as the 1st Minnesota Legislature. He fought in the Civil War for the 5th Minnesota Infantry Regiment and died due to his wounds from the Battle of Nashville.

== Biography ==
Bailly was born in the area of Michigan Territory that would later become Minnesota. His father was American Fur Company trader Alexis Bailly, and his mother was Lucy Faribault, daughter of Jean-Baptiste Faribault and Pelagie Faribault, and sister of Alexander Faribault. Bailly had mixed European and Native American ancestry through both his parents, as his father was descended from the Ottawa leader Maketoquit, and his mother was of Dakota heritage.

Bailly lived in Hastings, Minnesota with his wife and family and was a merchant. Bailly is credited as being the first permanent settler in Hastings as he built a house and trading business in the area in 1850. He was also one of the four men responsible for naming the city.

Bailly served as the postmaster of Hastings in 1854 and 1855. Bailly served in the Minnesota Territorial Council in 1856 and 1857 and was a Democrat. He then served in the Minnesota Democratic Constitutional Convention in 1857 and in the Minnesota Senate in 1857 and 1858.

Bailly served in the 5th Regiment, Minnesota Infantry of the Union Army during the American Civil War and was killed in the Battle of Nashville in 1865. His body was brought back to Minnesota, and his grave was rededicated in 2015 through the efforts of the Minnesota Civil War Commemoration Task Force.
