= Henry L. Bevans =

American politician and soldier

- Bevans c. 1858

Member of the Minnesota House of Representatives from the 6th District
- In office December 2, 1857 – December 6, 1859

Postmaster of Red Wing, Minnesota
- In office 1854–1858
- Preceded by: W.W. Sweney
- Succeeded by: H.C. Hoffmann

Personal details
- Born: May 20, 1823 Ohio, U.S.
- Died: November 23, 1876 (aged 53) Red Wing, Minnesota, U.S.
- Resting place: Oakwood Cemetery; Red Wing, Minnesota, U.S.
- Other political affiliations: Republican

Military service
- Allegiance: United States of America
- Branch/service: Union Army
- Years of service: 1861–1865
- Rank: Major
- Unit: Finance Corps
- Battles/wars: American Civil War

Henry Lewis Bevans (May 20, 1823 – November 23, 1876) was an American politician, soldier, and early citizen of Red Wing, Minnesota who served a single term in the Minnesota House of Representatives.

== Early life and education ==
Bevans was born on May 20, 1823, in Ohio. Bevans moved to Minnesota Territory around 1853, originally settling in Saint Paul, Minnesota, but later moving to Red Wing, Minnesota in 1854.

== Political career ==
Bevans was appointed as a county commissioner for Goodhue County, Minnesota in 1853 by Minnesota Governor Alexander Ramsey, a year later on June 16, 1854, Bevans was elected as the chairman of the board of county commissioners.^{:99} Bevans later briefly served as the postmaster of Red Wing from 1854 to 1858.^{:208}^{:235}

Bevans was elected on October 13, 1857, to serve in the Minnesota House of Representatives as a representative of the 6th Minnesota House district which included Goodhue County.^{:479} Bevans served during the 1st Minnesota Legislature from December 2, 1857, to December 6, 1859. During his term Bevans was a member of the Federal Relations Committee. Bevans was a member of the Republican Party of Minnesota.

== Military service ==
During the American Civil War Bevans served in the Finance Corps as a paymaster in the Union Army with the rank of Major.

== Personal life and death ==
Bevans died on November 23, 1876, in Red Wing, he is buried in Oakwood Cemetery.
