= Sylvanus Burgess =

American politician (1812–1876)

- Burgess c. 1858

Member of the Minnesota House of Representatives from the 8th District
- In office December 3, 1857 – December 6, 1859

Personal details
- Born: December 25, 1812 Grafton, Vermont, U.S.
- Died: May 24, 1876 (aged 63) Mankato, Minnesota, U.S.
- Other political affiliations: Republican

Sylvanus Burgess (December 25, 1812 – May 24, 1876) was an American farmer, politician, and early citizen of Olmsted County, Minnesota who served a single term in the Minnesota House of Representatives.

Burgess was one of the earliest settlers of Quincy Township in Olmsted County, Minnesota Territory.^{:37}

Burgess was elected to serve in the Minnesota House of Representatives on October 13, 1857, as a representative of Minnesota's 8th House district.^{:37} At the time the district included only Olmsted County. Burgess served during the 1st Minnesota Legislature from December 3, 1857, to December 6, 1859. During his term Burgess was a member of the militia committee.

== Later life and death ==
In 1864 Burgess moved to Mankato, Minnesota.^{:38} Burgess was killed in a lumber yard by falling boards on May 24, 1876, in Mankato.^{:38}
