= Francis Celeste Le Blond =

American politician (1821–1902)

Francis Le Blond
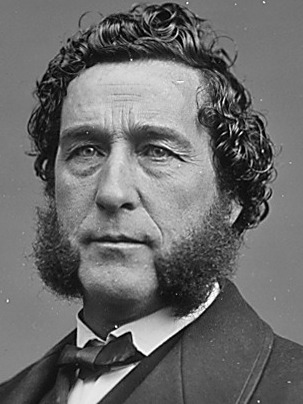

Member of the U.S. House of Representatives from Ohio's 5th district
- In office March 4, 1863 – March 3, 1867
- Preceded by: James Mitchell Ashley
- Succeeded by: William Mungen

Member of the Ohio House of Representatives from Mercer County
- In office January 5, 1852-January 6, 1856
- Preceded by: William Blackburn
- Succeeded by: John Shaw

Personal details
- Born: Francis Celeste Le Blond; February 14, 1821 Bellville, Ohio
- Died: November 9, 1902 (aged 81) Celina, Ohio
- Resting place: North Grove Cemetery
- Party: Democratic
- Relations: John Le Blond (brother)

Francis Celeste Le Blond (February 14, 1821 – November 9, 1902) was an American lawyer and politician who served two terms as a Democratic member of the U.S. House of Representatives from Ohio from 1863 to 1867.

== Biography ==
Francis Celeste Le Blond (grandfather of Frank Le Blond Kloeb) was born in Bellville, Ohio.

He was admitted to the bar in 1844 and commenced practice in Celina, Ohio.

=== State legislature ===
He was a member of the Ohio House of Representatives from 1851 to 1855. He served as speaker of the house in 1854 and 1855.

=== Congress ===
Le Blond was elected as a Democrat to the Thirty-eighth and Thirty-ninth Congresses. He declined to be a candidate for renomination in 1866.

=== Later career and death ===
He resumed the practice of law and also engaged in business, and died in Celina, Ohio, on November 9, 1902. Interment in North Grove Cemetery.

== Sources ==
- United States Congress. "Francis Celeste Le Blond (id: L000156)". Biographical Directory of the United States Congress.
- The Political Graveyard

U.S. House of Representatives
Preceded by James M. Ashley	Member of the U.S. House of Representatives from Ohio's 5th congressional district 1863 - 1867	Succeeded by William Mungen
Ohio House of Representatives
Preceded by William Blackburn	Representative from Mercer County; January 5, 1852-January 6, 1856	Succeeded by John Shaw
Preceded by James C. Johnson	Speaker of the House; January 2, 1854-January 6, 1856	Succeeded by Nelson H. Van Vorhes
