= Alexis Bailly =

American politician and fur trader (1798–1860)

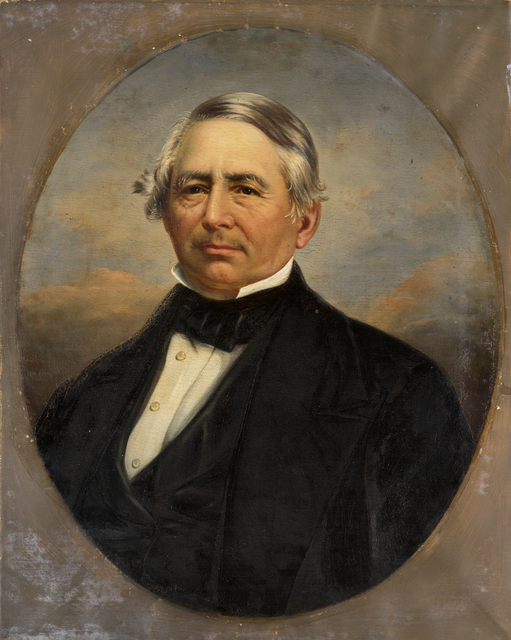
- Portrait of Bailly by Théophile Hamel

Member of the Minnesota Territorial House of Representatives
- In office September 3, 1849 – December 31, 1850

Personal details
- Born: December 14, 1798 Saint Joseph, Upper Canada
- Died: June 3, 1861 (aged 62) Wabasha, Minnesota, U.S.
- Resting place: Riverview Cemetery; Wabasha, Minnesota, U.S.
- Party: Democratic
- Spouse: Lucy Faribault
- Relations: Jean-Baptiste Faribault (father-in-law)
- Children: Henry G. Bailly
- Occupation: Fur trader

Alexis Bailly (December 14, 1798 – June 3, 1861) was an American politician and fur trader.

== Early life ==
Bailly was born in Saint Joseph, Upper Canada, to one of the "mixed-blood" families that was active in the North American fur trade. His father, Joseph Bailly, came from a French Canadian family. His mother, Angelique McGulpin (Bead-Way-Way or Mecopemequa) was a daughter of Maketoquit (Black Cloud), the chief of a large band of Grand River Ottawa. Alexis was one of three children. When his parents divorced, his older brother Francis remained with Maketoquit's band, while his younger sister Sophia was adopted by fur trader Magdelaine Laframboise, a close friend of the family. Alexis was sent to boarding school in Montreal. A native French speaker, Alexis Bailly also spoke and wrote flawless English, was fluent in several Native American languages, and had learned Latin.

In 1826, he married Lucy Faribault, the "mixed-blood" daughter of fur trader Jean-Baptiste Faribault, who had traded among the Dakota for years.

== Fur trade ==
From 1823 to 1835, with a brief hiatus in 1831, Bailly traded for the American Fur Company, working with Jean Joseph Rolette. One of his earliest jobs with the company was to drive a herd of cattle to the Red River Settlement. In 1834, as founder John Jacob Astor prepared to retire, the company was reorganized as a partnership with Ramsay Crooks as president and senior partner. Bailly was known as an "energetic and competent trader, whose string of posts along the upper Mississippi and up the Minnesota Valley had grossed some $20,000" in 1833. However, he had quarreled with Rolette and tried to set himself up as a competitor in 1831, causing Rolette and Crooks to mistrust him. Furthermore, Bailly had an ongoing feud with Indian agent Lawrence Taliaferro, which had culminated in a series of incidents involving confiscated whisky, lawsuits, and a threatened duel between the two men.

In October 1834, Ramsay sent 23-year-old Henry Hastings Sibley to the AFC's Western Outfit headquarters in Prairie du Chien, with the intention of having Sibley replace Bailly. Bailly refused to give up his business until his contract expired the following summer, but agreed to take Sibley with him to the mouth of the Minnesota River and introduce him to "the people, the country, and the far-flung operations of the Dakota trade." Sibley appreciated Bailly's guidance and later recalled that Bailly had warned him that American Fur Company squeezed its small traders dry, and had left him in financial ruin, despite the fact that he had cleared an estimated $200,000 for the company over ten years.

In September of 1837, Bailly was part of a delegation of traders who traveled to Washington D.C. with twenty Dakota leaders. In D.C., the Dakota signed a treaty with the U.S. government.

Around this time, Bailly purchased an enslaved woman named Courtney and her son Joseph Godfrey. He sold Courney when Godfrey was five. At some point, Godfrey was taken to St. Paul by a man called Brunson.

Bailly moved to Wabasha, Minnesota in 1842, where he continued to work as a fur trader until 1848. He served as a county commissioner and justice of the peace for Wabasha County from 1854 to 1857.

Bailly served in the House of Representatives of the 1st Minnesota Territorial Legislature in 1849. His son Henry G. Bailly also served in the Minnesota Territorial Legislature and in the Minnesota Senate. Bailly died at his home in Wabasha on June 3, 1861 at the age of 62.
