= William F. Wheeler =

William Fletcher Wheeler (July 6, 1824 – June 24, 1894) was the third U.S. Marshal for the Montana Territory.

Wheeler was born in Warwick, New York, the son of a Methodist minister who moved frequently. At the age of 19 William found work as an apprentice printer and reporter for the Ohio Statesman under Samuel Medary. He also studied law in his spare time, and in 1848 he was admitted to practice in front of the bar.

In 1856 Wheeler moved to St. Paul, Minnesota; the next year he accepted a position as Medary's personal secretary, who by then was the Minnesota Territorial Governor. When Minnesota was admitted to statehood in 1858, new Governor Henry Sibley commissioned Wheeler as a Lieutenant Colonel of the First Minnesota Voluntary Infantry. When the American Civil War broke out, Wheeler helped to raise volunteers for the war effort; he eventually saw action at Corinth, Iuka, and Vicksburg, but was discharged before the war's end due to illness.

Wheeler was appointed as United States Marshal of Montana Territory on May 15, 1869, succeeding Neil Howie. During his term of office he supervised construction of the U.S. Penitentiary at Deer Lodge. He served as Marshal until 1878.

Wheeler was a founding officer of the Montana Historical Society, and served as the organization's librarian from 1884 until his death in 1894.
