= Samuel Emery Adams =

American politician (1828–1912)

- Adams c. 1858

Member of the Minnesota Senate from the 19th District
- In office December 2, 1857 – January 7, 1861

Personal details
- Born: December 1, 1828 Reading, Vermont, U.S.
- Died: March 29, 1912 (aged 83) Minneapolis, Minnesota, U.S.
- Resting place: Lakewood Cemetery
- Other political affiliations: War Democrat

Military service
- Branch/service: Union Army
- Years of service: 1862–1866
- Battles/wars: American Civil War

Samuel Emery Adams (December 1, 1828 – March 28, 1912) was an American politician, freemason, and military officer who served two terms in the Minnesota Senate from 1857 to 1861 and fought in the American Civil War. Adams later served as a member of the Minneapolis City Council and served as an alderman of Minneapolis's Fourth Ward.

== Early life and education ==
Adams was born on December 1, 1828, in Reading, Vermont to Solomon Wright Adams and Mary Adaline Emery. Adam's father Solomon was a postmaster and politician that served in the Vermont General Assembly. Adams' family later moved to Bellows Falls, Vermont where Adams worked on his family farm. Adams was educated in common school while living in Bellow's Falls, he was later educated at the Chester Academy in Chester, Vermont, and the Thetford Academy in Thetford, Vermont in preparation for college. Adams later enrolled into Dartmouth College in 1851 however, he dropped out only a year into his studies due to his health.

Beginning in 1853 Adams was appointed as a route agent for the United States Post Office Department under the Franklin Pierce administration, which Adams served in until 1855. On June 1, 1856, Adams emigrated from Vermont to Minnesota Territory and settled in Monticello, Minnesota where he began working in the mercantile trade.

== Politics ==
Emery c. 1897

Beginning in 1857 Adams ran for a seat in the Minnesota Senate representing the 19th Minnesota Senate District which at the time included both Carver County, Minnesota and Wright County, Minnesota. Adams would win the 1857 election on October 13, 1857, and would serve his first term as part of the 1st Minnesota Legislature from December 12, 1857, to December 6, 1859. Adams served as second term for Minnesota's 19th Senate District from December 7, 1859, to January 7, 1861. Although independent, Adams politically identified as a War Democrat.

== Military service ==
At the outbreak of the American Civil War Adams volunteered for service in the Union Army. Adams was appointed by Abraham Lincoln as a paymaster in the Union Army with the rank of Lieutenant Colonel. Adams would serve in the Union Army from 1862 until January 1866 when he was mustered out of service.

== Later life and death ==
Following his military career Adams served as the president of the National Grange in Minnesota. Adams was a member and the president of the State Agricultural Society in 1879 and was a member of the Minnesota Historical Society. Adams served on the Minneapolis City Council beginning in 1892 and was reelected for a second term in 1896 as an alderman of Minneapolis's fourth ward. Adams was a Freemason of the Scottish Rite.

Adams died on March 29, 1912, in Minneapolis. He is buried in Lakewood Cemetery.

== Personal life ==
Adams married Augusta J. Smith on July 21, 1859, together they had two children.
