= Lucius C. Walker =

American businessman and politician (1823–1862)

- Ambrotype of Walker c. 1857

Indian Agent for the United States Bureau of Indian Affairs
- In office March 23, 1861 – August 22, 1862

Member of the Minnesota House of Representatives from the 23rd District
- In office December 2, 1857 – February 27, 1858 Serving with William H. Townsend

Postmaster of Saint Anthony, Minnesota
- In office April 22, 1854 – December 22, 1855

Personal details
- Born: March 16, 1823 Caledonia County, Vermont, U.S.
- Died: August 22–23, 1862 Minnesota, U.S.

Lucius Campbell Walker (March 16, 1823 – August, 1862), sometimes referred to as L.C. Walker, was an American businessman and politician who served a single term in the Minnesota Legislature and was an Indian agent for the Bureau of Indian Affairs.

== Early life ==
Walker was born on March 16, 1823 in Caledonia County, Vermont. Walker moved to Minnesota Territory in 1852 and settled in St. Anthony, Minnesota^{:196} where he worked as a real estate agent.

== Political career ==
Walker first served as the postmaster of St, Anthony from April 22, 1854, to December 22, 1855. Walker served as a Republican delegate from the 3rd District for the Minnesota Republican constitutional convention which helped ratify the Minnesota Constitution.^{:196} Walker later served during the 1st Minnesota Legislature as a member of the Republican Party of Minnesota representing Minnesota's 23rd House district. Walker resigned from his position in the Minnesota House on February 27, 1858.

== Indian agent career and death ==
Walker later worked for the Bureau of Indian Affairs as an Indian agent for the Ojibwe (also called the Chippewa) from March 23, 1861, until August 22, 1862. Walker was personally recommended by Governor Alexander Ramsey, as well as other prestigious Minnesota politicians, namely James H. Baker, Morton S. Wilkinson, Cyrus Aldrich, and William Windom to serve as an agent to the Mississippi Ojibwe.^{:196} Despite his recommendations, Walker was not a good agent to the Ojibwe, this was primarily due to the embezzlement of annuity funds with the help of Clark W. Thompson and Indian commissioner William P. Dole.^{:203}

On August 18, 1862, the first day of the Dakota War of 1862, Walker heard rumors that the Ojibwe under the command of Chief Hole-in-the-Day were amassing near Gull Lake in Cass County, Minnesota in order to attack Walker's Indian agency.^{:193} Walker requested military assistance from Fort Ripley, which in turn sent a detachment of soldiers from the 5th Minnesota Infantry Regiment to the agency.^{:193} Walker eventually fled the agency and committed suicide near Monticello, Minnesota due to fears of an Ojibwe uprising under Hole-in-the-Day. Walker's death date is disputed, some sources report it as August 22, 1862, while others report it as August 23, 1862.^{:132}
