= Reuben Butters =

American politician (1816–1888)

- Butters c. 1858

Member of the Minnesota Senate from the 17th District and 22nd District
- In office January 2, 1866 – January 4, 1869
- Preceded by: John J. Porter
- Succeeded by: Edson R. Smith

Member of the Minnesota House of Representatives from the 16th District and 17th District
- In office January 6, 1863 – January 2, 1865
- Preceded by: John J. Porter
- Succeeded by: L. C. Harrington
- In office December 2, 1857 – December 6, 1859
- Preceded by: Position established
- Succeeded by: Burroughs Abbott

Personal details
- Born: 1816 Maine, U.S.
- Died: March 29, 1888 (aged 71–72) Kasota, Minnesota, U.S.

Reuben Butters (1816 – March 29, 1888) was an American politician, businessman, and early citizen of Le Sueur County, Minnesota. Between 1857 and 1869, Butters served three nonconsecutive terms in the Minnesota House of Representatives and three consecutive terms in the Minnesota Senate. Butters was a significant figure behind the quarrying of Kasota limestone in southern Minnesota.

== Early life ==
Butters was born in 1816 in Maine.^{:371} Butters originally worked as a clerk in Maine before moving to Minnesota Territory in the autumn of 1851 and in 1854 settled in what is now Kasota, Minnesota alongside James Lindsley and George Thompson.^{:371-372}

By 1852 Butters owned and operated the Breen quarry in Kasota which quarried the regionally famous Kasota limestone. Butters, along with Joseph W. Babcock became prominent leaders of the limestone industry in southern Minnesota following the American Civil War.

== Political career ==
=== Local offices ===
Butters was elected as a county commissioner of Le Sueur County in 1857 and held the office until 1858.^{:384} Butters was again elected in 1860 as a county commissioner.^{:384} From 1879 to 1880 Butters served as the postmaster of Kasota.^{:404}

=== Minnesota House ===
Butters was first elected to serve in the Minnesota House of Representatives on October 13, 1857 representing Minnesota's 16th House district. The district at the time included Blue Earth County and Le Sueur County. Butters served in the 1st Minnesota Legislature where he was a member of the Towns and Counties committee.

Butters was later elected to serve in the 5th Minnesota Legislature from January 6, 1863 to January 4, 1864. During his second term Butters was a member of the Military Affairs committee, the Roads, Bridges, and Navigable Steams committee, and the Agriculture and Manufactures committee. Butters was ultimately reelected on November 3, 1863 to serve a consecutive term in the Minnesota House during the 6th Minnesota Legislature representing the same district. During his third term Butters was a member of the Public Lands and Railroads committees, and was the chair of the Towns and Counties committee.

=== Minnesota Senate ===
Butters was elected to serve in the Minnesota Senate on November 7, 1865 representing Minnesota's 17th Senate district. At the time the district included Blue Earth County and Le Sueur County, but later when it was changed to District 22 only represented Le Sueur County. Butters would serve three consecutive terms in the Minnesota Senate from January 2, 1866 until January 4, 1869 during the 8th Minnesota Legislature, 9th Minnesota Legislature, and 10th Minnesota Legislature. During his three terms in the Minnesota Senate, Butters was a member of several different committees.

== Death ==
According to The St. Paul Globe, Butters died on March 29, 1888 in Kasota.
