= Burroughs Abbott =

American politician (1830–1905)

Member of the South Dakota Senate from the 33rd district
- In office 1891–1892 Serving with James H. Kyle
- Preceded by: George W. Miller
- Succeeded by: Samuel A. Kennedy

Member of the Minnesota House of Representatives from the 16th district
- In office 1859–1860 Serving with Thomas McDonough
- Preceded by: Reuben Butters
- Succeeded by: James E. Child

Personal details
- Born: October 9, 1830 Indiana, U.S.
- Died: December 6, 1905 (aged 75)
- Party: Populist
- Other political affiliations: Republican
- Spouse: Angeline Ruggles
- Profession: teacher, farmer

Burroughs Abbott (October 9, 1830 – December 6, 1905) was an American politician who served in the Minnesota House of Representatives and the South Dakota Senate.

Abbott was born in Indiana on October 9, 1830. There, he married Angeline Ruggles, and worked as a farmer and teacher, before moving his family to Minnesota in 1856. He was elected to the state's House of Representatives, serving the sixteenth district from 1859 to 1860. Abbott moved to South Dakota in 1883, and between 1891 and 1892 was a state senator from Brown County, district 33. Though state records in Minnesota and South Dakota do not list a party affiliation for Abbott, George Washington Kingsbury writes that Abbot began his political career as a Republican and later joined the Populist Party. He died on December 6, 1905.
