= Dennis William Chauncey Dunwell =

American lawyer and politician (1817–1907)

Dennis W.C. Dunwell
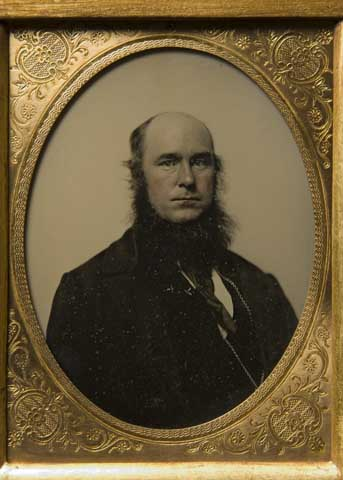
- Dunwell c. 1858

Member of the Minnesota Senate from the 3rd District
- In office December 2, 1857 – December 6, 1859 Serving with Henry G. Bailly
- Succeeded by: A.H. Norris

Member of the Idaho Legislature
- In office 1876–1877

Personal details
- Born: August 13, 1817 Pleasant Valley, New York, U.S.
- Died: February 20, 1907 (aged 89) Lewiston, Idaho, U.S.

Dennis William Chauncey Dunwell (August 13, 1817 – February 20, 1907), also known as D.W.C. Dunwell, was an American educator, businessman, politician, and lawyer. Dunwell was an early prominent citizen of West St. Paul, Minnesota and was later involved in the settlement of the states of Washington and Idaho.

== Early life ==
Dunwell was born on August 13, 1817 in Pleasant Valley, New York.^{:144} Dunwell's family later moved to Salisbury, Connecticut where he lived for much of his childhood.^{:144}

== Career ==
Dunwell originally worked was a teacher in Michigan, Pennsylvania, Ohio, and New York.^{:144} In 1850 Dunwell moved to Minnesota Territory and settled in the capitol of the Saint Paul, Minnesota.^{:144} While in Minnesota Dunwell worked in the grain industry, however, Dunwell lost many of his investments and money during the Panic of 1857.^{:144}

Dunwell was later elected to the Minnesota Senate on October 13, 1857 representing Minnesota's 3rd Senate district. At the time the district consisted of Dakota County, Minnesota. Dunwell served from December 2, 1857 to December 6, 1859. During Dunwell's term he served as the chairman of the Elections Committee and was a member of the Incorporations Committee. Dunwell later served as the sheriff of Ramsey County, Minnesota.^{:144}

== Later life ==
Dunwell later moved to Walla Walla, Washington in 1862, he later settled in Shoshone County, Idaho in 1871 where he was elected as the County Assessor for Shoshone County and was later elected to serve in the Idaho Territorial Assembly as a representative of Shoshone County from 1876 to 1877.^{:144} Dunwell's Idaho property was later destroyed in 1877 during the Nez Perce War causing him to move to Lewiston, Idaho.^{:144}

Dunwell died on February 20, 1907 in Lewiston.

== Personal life ==
Dunwell was married to Mary B. Breman in 1853, together they had two children.^{:144} Dunwell was a Freemason.
