= Boyd Phelps =

American politician and clergyman

The Reverend Boyd Phelps

Member of the Minnesota Senate from the 13th District
- In office December 2, 1857 – December 6, 1859
- Preceded by: Position established
- Succeeded by: Alonzo J. Edgerton

Chaplain of the Wisconsin Senate
- In office June 5, 1848 – January 1, 1849

Personal details
- Born: October 15, 1804 Tyrrell County, North Carolina, U.S.
- Died: March 17, 1886 (aged 81) Morris, Minnesota, U.S.
- Other political affiliations: Republican

Rev. Boyd Phelps (October 15, 1804 – March 17, 1886) was an American Methodist clergyman, politician, and early pioneer to the states of Wisconsin and Minnesota. Phelps served a single term in the Minnesota Senate during the 1st Minnesota Legislature.

== Early life and career ==
Phelps was born on October 15, 1804 in Tyrrell County, North Carolina. Around the age of 19 Phelps became a Methodist minister and in 1826 moved to Indiana and worked for the Indiana Conference of Methodists.^{:63} Phelps later moved to Wisconsin Territory, in 1839 Phelps preached his first sermon in Evansville, Wisconsin.^{:157}^{:207} In 1841 Phelps ministered in Green Bay, Wisconsin.^{:63} In August 1856, Phelps relocated to Hamilton, Wisconsin and was the Presiding Elder of the Beaver Dam District.^{:207}

Phelps was later appointed by the Methodist church to preach in Minnesota Territory.^{:129} While in Minnesota Territory Phelps settled in the village of Elkhorn in Mower County, Minnesota where he owned a farm.

== Political career ==
=== 1857 constitutional convention ===
Phelps was a member of the Republican Party of Minnesota. From July 13, 1857 to August 29, 1857 Phelps was elected as a representative of the 8th Council District of the Minnesota Territorial Republican Constitutional Convention which helped ratify the Minnesota Constitution.

=== Minnesota Senate ===
On October 13, 1857 Phelps was elected to serve in the Minnesota Senate representing Minnesota's 13th Senate district. At the time, the district included Dodge County and Mower County. Phelps served during the 1st Minnesota Legislature from December 2, 1857, to December 6, 1859. During his term, Phelps was a member of the towns and counties, public lands, and engrossments committees.

== Later life and death ==
Following his political career, Phelps continued to serve as a local minister for the Methodist church. Phelps died on March 17, 1886 in Morris, Minnesota.

== Personal life ==
Phelps was married to Clarissa Robinson in 1833, together they had five children.
