= Samuel P. Bacon =

American politician

- Bacon c. 1858

Member of the Minnesota House of Representatives from the 13th & 15th Districts
- In office December 2, 1857–December 6, 1859 (13th District); January 6, 1863–January 4, 1864 (15th District)

Personal details
- Born: February 26, 1825 New Hampshire, U.S.
- Died: October 12, 1903 (aged 78) Yates Center, Kansas, U.S.

Samuel Patrick Bacon (February 26, 1825 – October 12, 1903) was an American politician and farmer who served two nonconsecutive terms in the Minnesota House of Representatives. Bacon was an early member of the Latter Day Saint movement and actively campaigned for Joseph Smith during his 1844 presidential campaign. Bacon was later a member of the Strangite sect of the LDS church following the killing of Joseph Smith and is listed as a witness to the Book of the Law of the Lord.

== Early life ==
Bacon was born on February 26, 1825 in New Hampshire. Not much is known about Bacon's childhood and education.

== Latter Day Saints movement ==
=== 1844 Presidential election ===
Bacon began his career in politics on April 9, 1844 during the Joseph Smith 1844 presidential campaign as an electioneer representing the state of New York. Bacon began his electioneering campaign on April 18, 1844 where he actively campaigned for Smith in the states of Illinois, Indiana, Michigan, and New York.

=== Strangites and renunciation ===
Following the killing of Joseph Smith on June 27, 1844 Bacon joined the Strangite sect of the LDS founded by James Strang in 1847 and followed Strang to both Voree, Wisconsin and Beaver Island, Michigan. Bacon was later listed as a witness to Strang's Book of the Law of the Lord, an alleged translation by Strang of the Book of Laban. In 1854 Bacon became disillusioned with the Strangite movement calling it "human intervention" after discovering that the Laban plates were a fraud. That same year Bacon renounced the Strangite faith and moved to Minnesota Territory.^{:390}

== Political career ==
=== Local offices ===
Bacon moved to Minnesota Territory in 1854 and settled in Le Roy Township in Mower County, Minnesota.^{:390} While in Le Roy, Bacon was elected as the sheriff of Mower County on October 14, 1856.^{:65} Bacon was appointed as the justice of the peace and appointed as the treasurer of Mower County from 1857 to 1858.^{:55-56} Bacon later served as a county commissioner in 1860.^{:55-56,63} On September 26, 1862 Bacon was elected as the register of deeds for Mower County.^{:537}

=== Minnesota House of Representatives ===
Bacon was first elected to the Minnesota House of Representatives on October 13, 1857 representing Minnesota's 13th House district. At the time the district included Mower County and Dodge County. Bacon would serve in the 1st Minnesota Legislature from December 2, 1857 to December 6, 1859 as a member of the People's Party.

Bacon was later elected to the Minnesota House again on November 4, 1862 as a representative of Minnesota's 15th House district.^{:73} Bacon would serve in the 5th Minnesota Legislature from January 6, 1863 to January 4, 1864. During his second term Bacon was a member of the Engrossment committee and was the chair of the Towns and Counties committee.

== Later life ==
Following his term in the Minnesota Senate Bacon continued to work as a farmer in Le Roy.^{:931} In 1874 Samuel moved to Texas before settling in Yates Center, Kansas.^{:931} Bacon died on October 12, 1903 in Yates Center.
