= Edmund Mackintire =

American politician and businessman (1811–1884)

- Ambrotype of Mackintire c. 1858

Member of the Minnesota House of Representatives from the 10th District
- In office December 2, 1857 – December 6, 1859 Serving with Daniel F. Wilson and J.B. LeBlond

Personal details
- Born: May 11, 1811 Orange County, Vermont, U.S.
- Died: January 25, 1884 (aged 72) Houston, Minnesota, U.S.

Edmund Mackintire (May 11, 1811 – January 25, 1884), also spelled as McIntire, McIntyre or McKintire, was an American politician, businessman, and early citizen of Houston County, Minnesota who served a single term in the Minnesota House of Representatives.

== Early life and career ==
Mackintire was born on May 11, 1811 in Orange County, Vermont. At age fourteen Mackintire moved to Boston where he purchased a stagecoach line between Boston and Dedham, Massachusetts. Previous to the introduction of railroads, stagecoaches were the primary method of transportation from Dedham to Boston. Following the introduction of the railroad to Dedham Mackintire worked as a conductor.

In 1845 Mackintire moved to New Orleans, Louisiana where he worked as a merchant. In 1850 Mackintire moved to California where he took part in mining, before returning to Dedham and opening a hotel. In 1855 Mackintire moved to Minnesota Territory and settled in Yucatan in Houston County, Minnesota. While in Yucatan Mackintire built a gristmill and distillery.

== Political career ==
Mackintire first served as the justice of the peace in Yucatan before being elected to the Minnesota Legislature. Mackintire was elected to serve in the Minnesota House of Representatives on October 13, 1857 as a representative of Minnesota's 10th House district. Mackintire served during the 1st Minnesota Legislature, during his term he was a member of the elections committee.

== Later life and death ==
In 1860 Mackintire moved to Houston, Minnesota, while in Houston he owned a hotel before working on a farm. Mackintire died on January 25, 1884 in Houston.
