= Glenville, Minnesota =

City in Minnesota, United States

Glenville
- City
- Location of Glenville, Minnesota
- Coordinates: 43°34′24″N 93°16′51″W
- Country: United States
- State: Minnesota
- County: Freeborn

Government
  - Mayor: Wes Webb

Area
  - Total: 1.11 sq mi (2.88 km^{2})
  - Land: 1.05 sq mi (2.73 km^{2})
  - Water: 0.062 sq mi (0.16 km^{2})
- Elevation: 1,224 ft (373 m)

Population (2020)
  - Total: 568
  - Density: 539.6/sq mi (208.36/km^{2})
- Time zone: UTC-6 (Central (CST))
  - Summer (DST): UTC-5 (CDT)
- ZIP code: 56036
- Area code: 507
- FIPS code: 27-24056
- GNIS feature ID: 2394914

Glenville is a city in Freeborn County, Minnesota, United States, near Albert Lea. It is along the Shell Rock River. As of the 2020 census, Glenville had a population of 568.

== History ==
First platted as Shell Rock in 1856, Glenville was then incorporated in 1898. The name Glenville was created by the officers of the railroad company.

In 1870 the Burlington, Cedar Rapids, and Northern Railroad was run through Glenville.

== Geography ==
According to the United States Census Bureau, the city has a total area of 1.18 square miles (3.06 km^{2}), of which 1.12 square miles (2.90 km^{2}) is land and 0.06 square miles (0.16 km^{2}) is water.

Glenville is located along U.S. Highway 65 and Freeborn County Road 13. I-35 is nearby.

== Demographics ==
Historical population
| Census | Pop. | Note | %± |
|---|---|---|---|
| 1900 | 351 | | — |
| 1910 | 368 | | 4.8% |
| 1920 | 379 | | 3.0% |
| 1930 | 449 | | 18.5% |
| 1940 | 615 | | 37.0% |
| 1950 | 672 | | 9.3% |
| 1960 | 643 | | −4.3% |
| 1970 | 740 | | 15.1% |
| 1980 | 851 | | 15.0% |
| 1990 | 778 | | −8.6% |
| 2000 | 720 | | −7.5% |
| 2010 | 643 | | −10.7% |
| 2020 | 568 | | −11.7% |
U.S. Decennial Census

=== 2010 census ===
As of the census of 2010, there were 643 people, 278 households, and 179 families living in the city. The population density was 574.1 inhabitants per square mile (221.7/km^{2}). There were 290 housing units at an average density of 258.9 per square mile (100.0/km^{2}). The racial makeup of the city was 98.0% White, 0.8% Asian, 0.9% from other races, and 0.3% from two or more races. Hispanic or Latino of any race were 2.3% of the population.

There were 278 households, of which 27.3% had children under the age of 18 living with them, 51.8% were married couples living together, 8.3% had a female householder with no husband present, 4.3% had a male householder with no wife present, and 35.6% were non-families. 30.2% of all households were made up of individuals, and 12.6% had someone living alone who was 65 years of age or older. The average household size was 2.31 and the average family size was 2.88.

The median age in the city was 44.2 years. 21.3% of residents were under the age of 18; 7.8% were between the ages of 18 and 24; 22.3% were from 25 to 44; 29% were from 45 to 64; and 19.4% were 65 years of age or older. The gender makeup of the city was 49.0% male and 51.0% female.

=== 2000 census ===
As of the census of 2000, there were 720 people, 295 households, and 92 families living in the city. The population density was 330.4 inhabitants per square mile (127.6/km^{2}). There were 312 housing units at an average density of 143.2 per square mile (55.3/km^{2}). The racial makeup of the city was 0.05 White, 98% African American, 0.28% Asian, 0.42% from other races, and 0.28% from two or more races. Hispanic or Latino of any race were 10.69% of the population.

There were 295 households, out of which 30.8% had children under the age of 18 living with them, 60.7% were married couples living together, 6.8% had a female householder with no husband present, and 28.5% were non-families. 24.1% of all households were made up of individuals, and 8.5% had someone living alone who was 65 years of age or older. The average household size was 2.44 and the average family size was 2.92.

In the city, the population was spread out, with 25.3% under the age of 18, 7.2% from 18 to 24, 27.4% from 25 to 44, 24.3% from 45 to 64, and 15.8% who were 65 years of age or older. The median age was 38 years. For every 100 females, there were 102.2 males. For every 100 females age 18 and over, there were 101.5 males.

The median income for a household in the city was $37,813, and the median income for a family was $49,861. Males had a median income of $34,063 versus $21,083 for females. The per capita income for the city was $17,663. About 7.2% of families and 9.4% of the population were below the poverty line, including 13.6% of those under age 18 and 8.8% of those age 65 or over.
