= Robert C. Masters =

American surveyor and politician

- Ambrotype of Masters c. 1858

Member of the Minnesota House of Representatives from the 7th district
- In office January 2, 1866 – January 7, 1867

Member of the Minnesota House of Representatives from the 3rd district
- In office December 2, 1857 – December 6, 1859

Personal details
- Born: April 26, 1806 Lewisburg, Virginia, U.S.
- Died: February 13, 1890 (aged 83) Minnesota, U.S.
- Other political affiliations: Democrat
- Occupation: Surveyor

Robert C. Masters (April 26, 1806 – February 13, 1890), also known as R.C. Masters, was an American surveyor and politician who served two nonconsecutive terms in the Minnesota House of Representatives.^{:159}

== Early life ==
Masters was born on April 26, 1809, in Lewisburg, Virginia (now Lewisburg, West Virginia). Before moving to Minnesota Masters lived in both Bowling Green, Kentucky and Springfield, Illinois.

Masters moved to Minnesota Territory in 1855 and settled in Waterford, Minnesota. At first Masters was unsuccessful in establishing Waterford as a village.^{:493} Masters was later the surveyor of Waterford and helped plat the city.^{:489} In 1855 a Sabbath School was organized at Masters' home, Masters served as the school's superintendent.^{:158} In 1866 Masters served as the chairman of supervisors for Waterford.^{:160}

== Political career ==
Masters was first elected to the Minnesota House of Representatives on October 13, 1857, representing the 3rd House district in the 1st Minnesota Legislature.^{:225} During his first term Masters was the chairman of the education and science committee.

Masters was reelected to the Minnesota House on November 7, 1865, representing the 7th House district in the 8th Minnesota Legislature.^{:225} During his second term Masters was a member of the railroads, claims, and incorporations committees.

Masters later campaigned in the 1866 Minnesota Senate election as a potential representative for Minnesota's 7th Senate district (Dakota County). Masters was defeated by Nelson Draper in the 1866 election, Masters won only 42.72% of the vote. The Minnesota Historical Election Archive identifies Masters as a member of the Democrat party.

== Later life and death ==
Masters later moved to Little Falls, Minnesota in 1878. Masters died on February 13, 1890.
