= William S. Chowen =

American soldier and politician (1822–1912)

- Chowen c. 1858

Member of the Minnesota House of Representatives from the 4th District
- In office December 2, 1857 – December 6, 1859
- Governor: Samuel Medary

Personal details
- Born: June 22, 1826 Roxbury, New York, U.S.
- Died: February 8, 1912 (aged 85) Minnetonka, Minnesota, U.S.
- Resting place: Groveland Cemetery, Minnetonka, Minnesota, U.S.
- Other political affiliations: Republican

Military service
- Allegiance: United States of America
- Branch/service: Union Army
- Years of service: 1864–1865
- Rank: Sergeant
- Unit: Company F, 11th Minnesota Infantry Regiment
- Battles/wars: American Civil War

William Streeter Chowen (June 22, 1826 – February 8, 1912) was an American politician, businessman, soldier, and early citizen of Minnetonka, Minnesota. Chowen served as single term in the 1st Minnesota Legislature as a member of the Minnesota House of Representatives representing Minnesota’s 4th House District.

== Early life and career ==
Chowen was born on June 22, 1826 in Roxbury, New York to Morris Chowen and Betsey Chowen (née Streeter).^{:1465} Chowen grew up as a farmer and later worked as a millwright in the Lehigh Valley, he later worked in White Haven, Pennsylvania and Virginia at various lumber mills.^{:1465}

Chowen moved to Minnesota Territory on May 22, 1853 and settled in Minnetonka in Hennepin County, Minnesota where he owned a farm and purchased 160 acres of land near Lake Minnetonka.^{:1465}

== Politics and military service ==
Chowen began his political career in 1857 as a member of the Minnesota Constitutional Convention which helped to ratify the Minnesota Constitution, Chowen was a member of the Republican Party of Minnesota. Following the Constitutional Convention, Chowen was elected to the Minnesota House on October 13, 1857 representing the Minnesota’s 4th House District, at the time the district included Hennepin County. Chowen served from December 2, 1857 to December 6, 1859. During his term Chowen was on the Mines and Minerals Committee and helped established an experimental agricultural college in Glencoe, Minnesota with assistance from the University of Minnesota, the Patrons of Husbandry, and John H. Stevens.

During the American Civil War Chowen enlisted into the Union Army on August 13, 1864 and was enrolled into Company F of the 11th Minnesota Infantry Regiment as a Sergeant. Chowen served in Nashville, Tennessee and Gallatin, Tennessee before being discharged with the rest of the regiment on June 26, 1865 at Fort Snelling.

== Later life and death ==
Following his military service and term in the Minnesota House, Chowen pursued a career in civil service. Chowen served in several local offices for Hennipin County and Minnetonka including county commissioner of Hennepin County from 1882 to 1892, as well as Minnetonka’s town clerk and justice of the peace.^{:1467} Chowen was also an active member in the National Grange where he was the Master of the Minnesota State Grange, as well as the Independent Order of Odd Fellows and the Grand Army of the Republic.^{:1466}

Chowen died on February 8, 1912 in Minnetonka, he is buried in Groveland Cemetery in Minnetonka.

== Personal life ==
Chowen was married to Mary M. Frear on May 25, 1865, together they had six children.^{:1466} Chowen was a follower of Unitarian Christianity.^{:1466}
