= Amos Coggswell =

American politician (1825–1892)

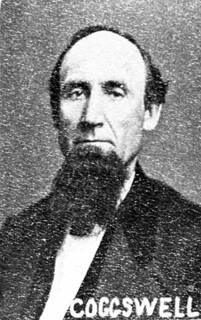

3rd Speaker of the Minnesota House of Representatives
- In office 1859–1861
- Preceded by: George Bradley
- Succeeded by: Jared Benson

Minnesota State Representative from the 15th District
- In office December 7, 1859 – January 7, 1861

Minnesota State Senator from the 12th District
- In office January 2, 1872 – January 3, 1876
- Preceded by: Leonard B. Hodges
- Succeeded by: Louis L. Wheelock

Personal details
- Born: September 29, 1825 Boscawen, New Hampshire, U.S.
- Died: November 15, 1892 (aged 67) Steele County, Minnesota, U.S.
- Party: Republican; Democrat
- Profession: Lawyer, Farmer

Amos Coggswell (September 29, 1825 in Boscawen, New Hampshire – November 15, 1892 in Steele County, Minnesota) was a Minnesota politician, a member of both the Republican and Democratic parties, and a former Speaker of the Minnesota House of Representatives. Coggswell served as a delegate to the Republican State Constitutional Convention in 1857. He was elected to the Minnesota House of Representatives in 1858, and became the second house speaker in 1859.

In 1867, he ran unsuccessfully for Minnesota Secretary of State as a Democrat. Coggswell was later elected to the Minnesota Senate, where he served the 12th District from 1872 to 1875.

Political offices
Preceded by George Bradley	Speaker of the Minnesota House of Representatives; 1859–1861	Succeeded by Jared Benson
