= John W. Crosby =

American politician and soldier (1825–1865)

- Crosby c. 1858

2nd Chief of Police of the Saint Paul Police Department
- In office May 24, 1858 – August 3, 1859

Member of the Minnesota House of Representatives from the 2nd District
- In office December 2, 1857 – December 6, 1859

Personal details
- Born: John Wall Crosby c. 1825 Philadelphia, Pennsylvania, U.S.
- Died: April 2, 1865 Petersburg, Virginia, U.S.
- Resting place: Arlington Cemetery; Drexel Hill, Pennsylvania, U.S.

Military service
- Allegiance: United States of America
- Branch/service: Union Army
- Years of service: 1861–1865
- Rank: Lieutenant colonel
- Unit: 61st Pennsylvania Infantry Regiment
- Battles/wars: American Civil War; Third Battle of Petersburg †

John Wall Crosby (c. 1825 – April 2, 1865) was American police officer, politician, and soldier who served a single term in the Minnesota Senate and was the second chief of police of the Saint Paul Police Department. Crosby later served during the American Civil War as a staff officer of the 61st Pennsylvania Infantry Regiment and was killed in action at the Siege of Petersburg.

== Early life ==
Crosby was born around 1825 in Philadelphia, Pennsylvania. Crosby moved to Minnesota Territory in 1850 and resided in Saint Paul, Minnesota.^{:267}

== Law enforcement career ==
Crosby later served as the chief of police for the Saint Paul Police Department from May 24, 1858, to August 3, 1859.^{:463}

== Political career ==
Crosby was elected to the Minnesota House of Representatives on October 13, 1857, representing Minnesota's 2nd House district. Crosby served during the 1st Minnesota Legislature from December 2, 1857, to December 6, 1859. During his term Crosby was a member of the Printing Committee and was the chairman of the Mines and Minerals Committee. Crosby was a member of the Democratic Party of Minnesota.^{:382}

== Military service and death ==
During the American Civil War Crosby enlisted into the Union Army on August 8, 1861, and was enrolled into the ranks of Company A of the 23rd Pennsylvania Infantry Regiment as a first lieutenant.^{:192} On September 2, 1861, Crosby was transferred to Company G of the 61st Pennsylvania Infantry Regiment.^{:24,159}^{:416} Crosby lost his arm at the Battle of Fort Stevens.^{:108} Crosby was eventually promoted to the rank of major on April 22, 1864^{:416} and lieutenant colonel on February 22, 1865.^{:159}^{:416}

Crosby was killed in action during the Third Battle of Petersburg on April 2, 1865.^{:147-148}^{:416} Crosby is buried in Arlington Cemetery in Drexel Hill, Pennsylvania.
