= George Bradley (Minnesota politician) =

American politician

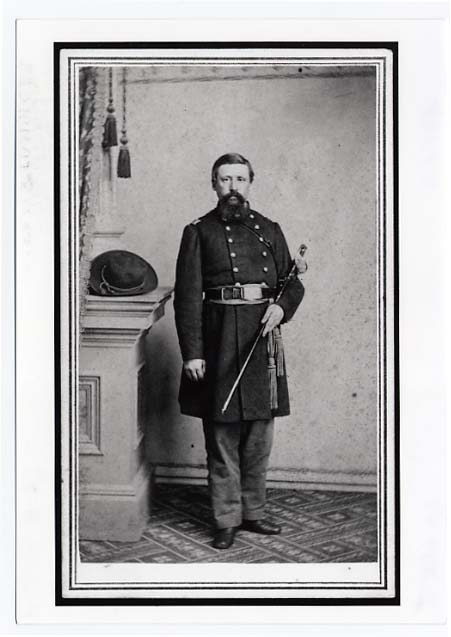
- Bradley c. 1863 by Joel Emmons Whitney

2nd Speaker of the Minnesota House of Representatives
- In office March 12, 1858 – December 6, 1859
- Preceded by: John S. Watrous
- Succeeded by: Amos Coggswell

Member of the Minnesota House of Representatives from the 7th district
- In office December 2, 1857 – December 6, 1859
- Succeeded by: Multiple-member district

Personal details
- Born: c. 1833 Charleston, Maine, U.S.
- Died: 1879 (aged 45–46)
- Children: 2

Military service
- Branch/service: Union Army
- Unit: 7th Minnesota Infantry Regiment
- Battles/wars: American Civil War

George Bradley (c. 1833 – 1879) was an American politician and a former member of the Minnesota House of Representatives. He represented District 7, which at that time included portions of Scott County just southwest of what is now the Twin Cities.

== Career ==
Bradley was elected to the position of speaker pro tempore of the Minnesota House of Representatives on December 22, 1857, when then-Speaker John S. Watrous took leave to attend to personal business. When, due to Watrous' prolonged absence, the speaker's chair was declared vacant on March 12, 1858, Bradley was elected speaker in his own right. Bradley, at only 25, became the youngest speaker in Minnesotan history.

In 1860 he was appointed receiver of the United States General Land Office in St. Paul. Abraham Lincoln's call for volunteers prompted him to volunteer as a major in the 7th Minnesota Infantry Regiment. He saw action in Minnesota during the Sioux Uprising and then in Missouri, the Battle of Nashville, Tennessee. and the Battle of Tupelo. By the end of the Civil War he had been made a Lt. Colonel.

Minnesota Legislators Past & Present lists Bradley's party affiliation as "Not Available," while the Minnesota Legislative Reference Library's list of Speakers of the House of Representatives lists "R?," indicating that the MLRL does not know what Bradley's party affiliation was, and is merely guessing that he might have been a Republican; on the other hand, Bradley was elected Speaker at a time when the Democrats held a 55 percent voting majority in the Minnesota House of Representatives, and, in 1860, received a federal civil service appointment from the Buchanan Administration, similar to John S. Watrous.
