= Quincy Township, Olmsted County, Minnesota =

Quincy Township, Minnesota
- Township
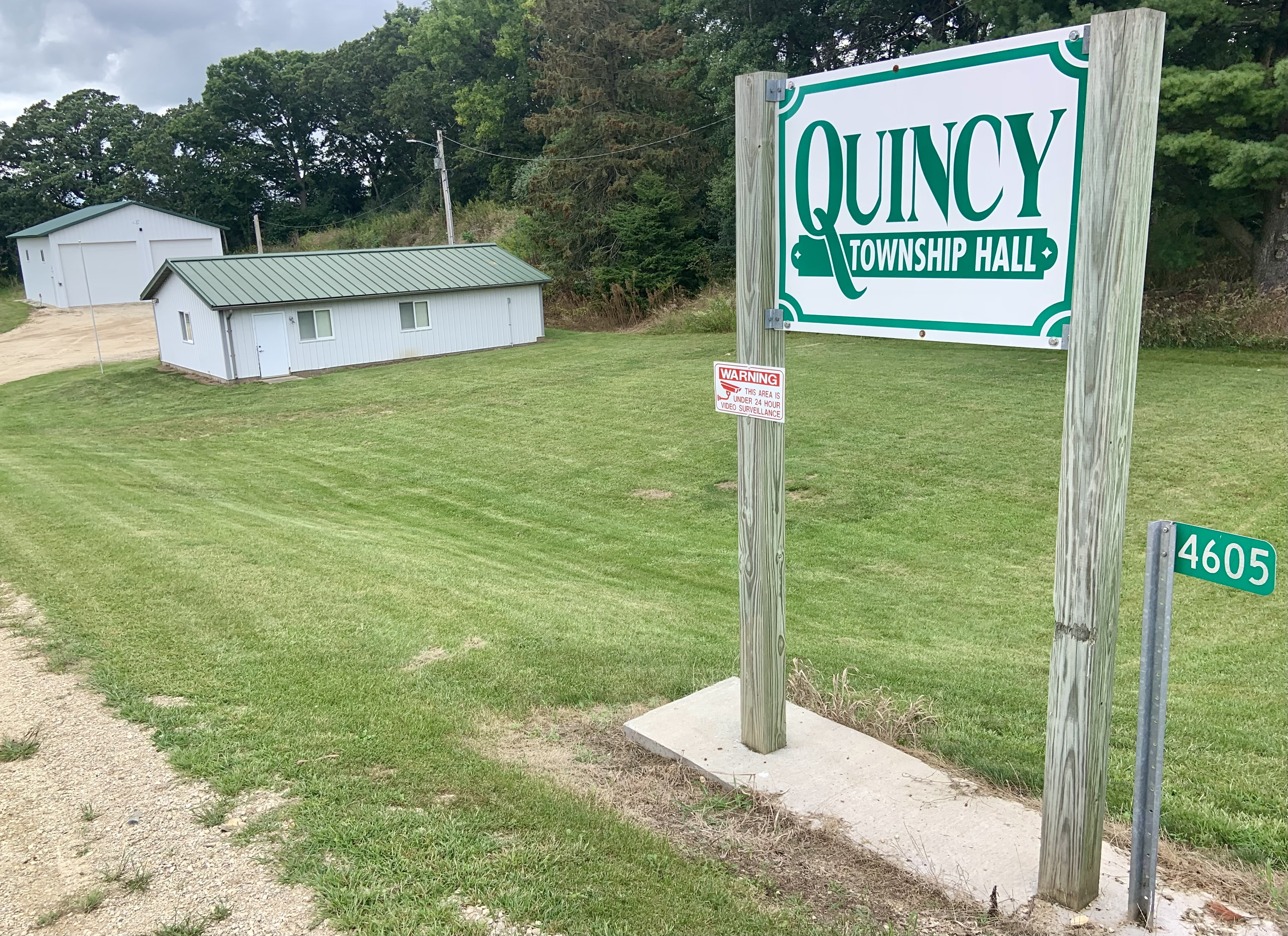
- Town hall

- Location within the state of Minnesota Quincy Township, Minnesota (the United States)
- Coordinates: 44°4′11″N 92°8′48″W
- Country: United States
- State: Minnesota
- County: Olmsted

Area
  - Total: 35.6 sq mi (92.3 km^{2})
  - Land: 35.6 sq mi (92.3 km^{2})
  - Water: 0 sq mi (0.0 km^{2})
- Elevation: 1,220 ft (372 m)

Population (2000)
  - Total: 356
  - Density: 10/sq mi (3.9/km^{2})
- Time zone: UTC-6 (Central (CST))
  - Summer (DST): UTC-5 (CDT)
- FIPS code: 27-52792
- GNIS feature ID: 0665367

Quincy Township is a township in Olmsted County, Minnesota, United States. The population was 356 at the 2000 census.

== History ==
Quincy Township was organized in 1858.

== Geography ==
According to the United States Census Bureau, the township has a total area of 35.7 square miles (92.4 km^{2}), all land.

== Demographics ==
As of the census of 2000, there were 356 people, 124 households, and 97 families residing in the township. The population density was 10.0 inhabitants per square mile (3.9/km^{2}). There were 131 housing units at an average density of 3.7 per square mile (1.4/km^{2}). The racial makeup of the township was 97.75% White, 0.28% Asian, and 1.97% from two or more races. Hispanic or Latino of any race were 0.56% of the population.

There were 124 households, out of which 34.7% had children under the age of 18 living with them, 73.4% were married couples living together, 1.6% had a female householder with no husband present, and 21.0% were non-families. 15.3% of all households were made up of individuals, and 6.5% had someone living alone who was 65 years of age or older. The average household size was 2.87 and the average family size was 3.18.

In the township the population was spread out, with 26.1% under the age of 18, 9.0% from 18 to 24, 30.1% from 25 to 44, 23.0% from 45 to 64, and 11.8% who were 65 years of age or older. The median age was 38 years. For every 100 females, there were 108.2 males. For every 100 females age 18 and over, there were 117.4 males.

The median income for a household in the township was $45,000, and the median income for a family was $60,750. Males had a median income of $29,688 versus $30,625 for females. The per capita income for the township was $19,492. About 4.5% of families and 3.7% of the population were below the poverty line, including none of those under age 18 and 10.3% of those age 65 or over.
