= Waterford, Minnesota =

Unincorporated community in Minnesota, United States

Waterford
- Unincorporated community
- Location within Minnesota
- Coordinates: 44°29′02″N 93°08′35″W
- Country: United States
- State: Minnesota
- County: Dakota County
- Township: Waterford Township
- Elevation: 932 ft (284 m)
- ZIP code: 55057
- GNIS feature ID: 653833

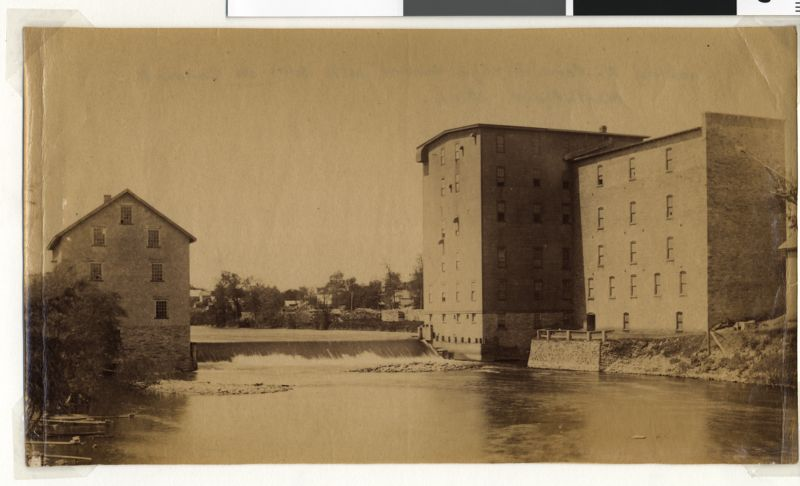
Former Waterford mill in 1895

Waterford is an unincorporated community in Waterford Township, Dakota County, Minnesota, United States.

== Geography ==
Waterford is located immediately northeast of Northfield at the junction of State Highway 3 (MN 3) and Northfield Boulevard / Dakota County Road 47. Nearby places also include Randolph and Castle Rock. The Cannon River flows through the community.

Waterford lies in the southern part of Dakota County. The boundary line between Dakota and Rice counties is nearby.

== History ==
A post office called Waterford was established in 1854, and remained in operation until it was discontinued in 1904. The community took its name from Waterford Township.
