= Marion, Minnesota =

Marion
- Unincorporated community and Census designated place
- Location within Minnesota Location within the United States
- Coordinates: 43°56′35″N 92°21′11″W
- Country: United States
- State: Minnesota
- County: Olmsted
- Township: Marion Township

Area
  - Total: 1.86 sq mi (4.82 km^{2})
  - Land: 1.86 sq mi (4.82 km^{2})
  - Water: 0 sq mi (0.00 km^{2})
- Elevation: 1,125 ft (343 m)

Population (2020)
  - Total: 271
  - Density: 145.6/sq mi (56.21/km^{2})
- Time zone: UTC-6 (Central (CST))
  - Summer (DST): UTC-5 (CDT)
- ZIP code: 55904
- Area code: 507
- GNIS feature ID: 2806363

Marion is an unincorporated community in Marion Township, Olmsted County, Minnesota, United States.

As of the 2020 census, Marion had a population of 271.

== Geography ==
Marion is located at 43°56′35″N 92°21′11″W. According to the United States Census Bureau, the community has a total area of 4.82 km^{2} (1.86 sq mi), all of it land.

== History ==
Marion was founded either in 1855 or 1856. A post office was established at Marion in 1857, and remained in operation until 1905.

Historical population
Census	Pop.	Note	%±
1880	112		—
2020	271		—
U.S. Decennial Census
