= Samuel Medary =

Territorial Governor of Minnesota

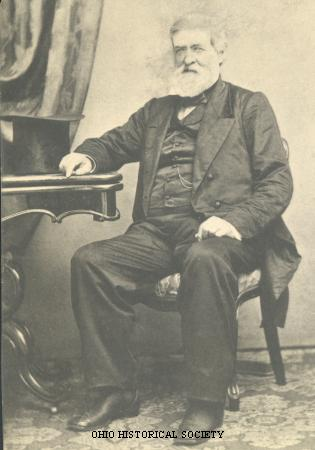

3rd Territorial Governor of Minnesota
- In office April 23, 1857 – May 24, 1858
- Appointed by: James Buchanan
- Preceded by: Willis A. Gorman
- Succeeded by: Office abolished Henry Hastings Sibley as Governor of Minnesota

6th Territorial Governor of Kansas
- In office December 1858 – December 1860
- Preceded by: James W. Denver
- Succeeded by: Office abolished Charles L. Robinson as Governor of Kansas

Personal details
- Born: February 25, 1801 Montgomery County, Pennsylvania, United States
- Died: November 7, 1864 (aged 63) Columbus, Ohio, United States
- Resting place: Green Lawn Cemetery, Columbus, Ohio
- Party: Democratic
- Profession: newspaper owner

Samuel Medary (February 25, 1801 – November 7, 1864) was an American newspaper owner and politician. He served as the last territorial governor of Minnesota, and later, Kansas.

== Biography ==
Born and raised in Montgomery County, Pennsylvania, he settled in Bethel, Ohio, in 1825. After a term in the Ohio House of Representatives (1834) and the Ohio State Senate (1836–38) as a Jackson Democrat, he purchased a newspaper in Columbus that became the Ohio Statesman, which he edited until 1857. He was active at the National Democratic Conventions at Baltimore in 1844, where he was instrumental in the nomination of James K. Polk; and at Cincinnati in 1856, where he was the President pro tempore. He earned his nickname 'wheel horse of Ohio democracy', which he became nationally known by.

President James Buchanan appointed him as the third Territorial Governor of Minnesota from April 23, 1857, to May 24, 1858. His appointment was initially met with bipartisan approval in the territory. Minnesota became a state on May 11, 1858, and elected Henry Hastings Sibley as the state's first governor. However, he spent most of this time out of state, resulting on Territorial Secretary Charles L. Chase declaring himself as acting Governor in October 1857.

Samuel Medary was also Governor of Kansas Territory from December 1858 to December 1860. William F. Wheeler was territory Librarian and the Governor's Secretary while in office.

Returning to Columbus, Ohio, he established a newspaper he named The Crisis. While living in Columbus, Medary resided at his estate, Northwood Place, located along the Worthington Pike, now North High Street, near Northwood Avenue. Medary was indicted by a federal grand jury in 1864 for conspiracy against the government and was arrested. He was released on bond, but died in Columbus, Ohio before he could be tried.

== Legacy ==
One of the first townsites in Dakota Territory is named after Medary. The town of Medaryville, Indiana, was also named after him. In North Columbus, Ohio (annexed to the city of Columbus in the late 1800s), a street dating back to the early 1900s Medary Avenue was named for him. Because Columbus Public Schools names its schools for the street on which they are located, Medary Elementary School also carried his surname.

Medary was buried at Green Lawn Cemetery, Columbus, Ohio.

== Notes ==
Party political offices
First	Democratic nominee for Governor of Kansas; 1859	Vacant Title next held by George Washington Glick
Political offices
Preceded by James W. Denver	Territorial Governor of Kansas; 1858–1860	Succeeded by Charles L. Robinson; Governor
Preceded by Willis A. Gorman	3rd Governor of Minnesota Territory; 1857–1858	Succeeded by Henry Hastings Sibley; Governor
