= Minnesota's 3rd Senate district =

American legislative district

Minnesota's 3rd State Senate district
Senator
| Grant Hauschild; DFL–Hermantown |
- Demographics: 92.5% White; 0.9% Black; 1.7% Hispanic; 0.6% Asian; 2.5% Native American <0.1% Hawaiian/Pacific Islander; 0.9% Other; 2.6% Multiracial
- Population (2020): 78,683

District 3 of the Minnesota Senate encompasses Lake, Cook, and Koochiching counties, as well as parts of St. Louis, and Itasca counties. It is currently represented by Grant Hauschild of the DFL, who was elected in 2022.

== List of senators ==
| Session | Image | Senator | Party | Term start | Term end | Home | Location |
|---|---|---|---|---|---|---|---|
| 1st | | Henry G. Bailly | Democratic | December 2, 1857 | December 6, 1859 | Hastings | Dakota |
| 1st | | Dennis William Chauncey Dunwell | Non-partisan | December 2, 1857 | December 6, 1859 | West St. Paul | Dakota |
| 2nd | | A.H. Norris | Non-partisan | December 12, 1859 | January 7, 1861 | Hastings | Dakota |
| 2nd | | Eli Robinson | Non-partisan | December 12, 1859 | January 7, 1861 | Hastings | Dakota |
| 3rd | | Seth Gibbs | Non-partisan | January 8, 1861 | January 1, 1862 | Clearwater | Aitkin Andy Johnson (defunct) Becker Breckenridge (defunct) Buchanan (defunct) Carlton Cass Clay Crow Wing Douglas Itasca Lake Morrison Otter Tail Pembina (defunct) Polk Pope St. Louis Stearns Todd Toombs (defunct) Wadena Wilkin |
| 4th | | Sylvanus Lowry | Democratic | January 2, 1862 | February 22, 1862 | St. Cloud | Aitkin Andy Johnson (defunct) Becker Breckenridge (defunct) Buchanan (defunct) Carlton Cass Clay Crow Wing Douglas Itasca Lake Morrison Otter Tail Pembina (defunct) Polk Pope St. Louis Stearns Todd Toombs (defunct) Wadena Wilkin |
| 4th | | William S. Moore | Non-partisan | September 10, 1862 | January 4, 1863 | St. Cloud | Aitkin Andy Johnson (defunct) Becker Breckenridge (defunct) Buchanan (defunct) Carlton Cass Clay Crow Wing Douglas Itasca Lake Morrison Otter Tail Pembina (defunct) Polk Pope St. Louis Stearns Todd Toombs (defunct) Wadena Wilkin |
| 5th | | William S. Moore | Non-partisan | September 10, 1862 | January 4, 1863 | St. Cloud | Aitkin Andy Johnson (defunct) Becker Breckenridge (defunct) Buchanan (defunct) Carlton Cass Clay Crow Wing Douglas Itasca Lake Morrison Otter Tail Pembina (defunct) Polk Pope St. Louis Stearns Todd Toombs (defunct) Wadena Wilkin |
| 6th | | Joseph P. Wilson | Democratic | January 5, 1863 | January 2, 1865 | St. Cloud | Aitkin Andy Johnson (defunct) Becker Breckenridge (defunct) Buchanan (defunct) Carlton Cass Clay Crow Wing Douglas Itasca Lake Morrison Otter Tail Pembina (defunct) Polk Pope St. Louis Stearns Todd Toombs (defunct) Wadena Wilkin |
| 7th | | Louis A. Evans | Democratic | January 3, 1865 | January 1, 1866 | St. Cloud | Aitkin Andy Johnson (defunct) Becker Breckenridge (defunct) Buchanan (defunct) Carlton Cass Clay Crow Wing Douglas Itasca Lake Morrison Otter Tail Pembina (defunct) Polk Pope St. Louis Stearns Todd Toombs (defunct) Wadena Wilkin |
| 8th | | Reuben M. Richardson | Non-partisan | January 2, 1866 | January 7, 1867 | Torah | Aitkin Andy Johnson (defunct) Becker Breckenridge (defunct) Buchanan (defunct) Carlton Cass Clay Crow Wing Douglas Itasca Lake Morrison Otter Tail Pembina (defunct) Polk Pope St. Louis Stearns Todd Toombs (defunct) Wadena Wilkin |
| 9th | | Louis A. Evans | Democratic | January 8, 1867 | January 6, 1868 | St. Cloud | Aitkin Andy Johnson (defunct) Becker Breckenridge (defunct) Buchanan (defunct) Carlton Cass Clay Crow Wing Douglas Itasca Lake Morrison Otter Tail Pembina (defunct) Polk Pope St. Louis Stearns Todd Toombs (defunct) Wadena Wilkin |
| 10th | | Charles Andrew Gilman | Republican | January 7, 1868 | January 3, 1870 | St. Cloud | Aitkin Andy Johnson (defunct) Becker Breckenridge (defunct) Buchanan (defunct) Carlton Cass Clay Crow Wing Douglas Itasca Lake Morrison Otter Tail Pembina (defunct) Polk Pope St. Louis Stearns Todd Toombs (defunct) Wadena Wilkin |
| 11th | | Charles Andrew Gilman | Republican | January 7, 1868 | January 3, 1870 | St. Cloud | Aitkin Andy Johnson (defunct) Becker Breckenridge (defunct) Buchanan (defunct) Carlton Cass Clay Crow Wing Douglas Itasca Lake Morrison Otter Tail Pembina (defunct) Polk Pope St. Louis Stearns Todd Toombs (defunct) Wadena Wilkin |
| 12th | | William Chester Waite | Non-partisan | January 4, 1870 | January 1, 1872 | St. Cloud | Aitkin Andy Johnson (defunct) Becker Breckenridge (defunct) Buchanan (defunct) Carlton Cass Clay Crow Wing Douglas Itasca Lake Morrison Otter Tail Pembina (defunct) Polk Pope St. Louis Stearns Todd Toombs (defunct) Wadena Wilkin |
| 13th | | William Chester Waite | Non-partisan | January 4, 1870 | January 1, 1872 | St. Cloud | Aitkin Andy Johnson (defunct) Becker Breckenridge (defunct) Buchanan (defunct) Carlton Cass Clay Crow Wing Douglas Itasca Lake Morrison Otter Tail Pembina (defunct) Polk Pope St. Louis Stearns Todd Toombs (defunct) Wadena Wilkin |
| 14th | | John Q. Farmer | Republican | January 2, 1872 | January 6, 1873 | Spring Valley | Fillmore |
| 15th | | William Meighen | Republican | January 7, 1873 | January 1, 1877 | Forestville | Fillmore |
| 16th | | William Meighen | Republican | January 7, 1873 | January 1, 1877 | Forestville | Fillmore |
| 17th | | William Meighen | Republican | January 7, 1873 | January 1, 1877 | Forestville | Fillmore |
| 18th | | William Meighen | Republican | January 7, 1873 | January 1, 1877 | Forestville | Fillmore |
| 19th | | Charles G. Edwards | Republican | January 2, 1877 | January 6, 1879 | Spring Valley | Fillmore |
| 20th | | Charles G. Edwards | Republican | January 2, 1877 | January 6, 1879 | Spring Valley | Fillmore |
| 21st | | Calvin Siscoe Powers | Non-partisan | January 7, 1879 | January 1, 1883 | Fountain | Fillmore |
| 22nd | | Calvin Siscoe Powers | Non-partisan | January 7, 1879 | January 1, 1883 | Fountain | Fillmore |
| 23rd | | William L. Hollister | Republican | January 2, 1883 | ? | Austin | Mower |
| 23rd | | Vacant | | ? | January 6, 1885 | Austin | Mower |
| 24th | | W.T. Wilkins | Non-partisan | January 6, 1885 | January 3, 1887 | Austin | Mower |
| 25th | | Otis W. Gibson | Democratic | January 4, 1887 | January 5, 1891 | Austin | Mower |
| 26th | | Otis W. Gibson | Democratic | January 4, 1887 | January 5, 1891 | Austin | Mower |
| 27th | | Oscar Ayers | Republican | January 6, 1891 | January 7, 1895 | Austin | Mower |
| 28th | | Oscar Ayers | Republican | January 6, 1891 | January 7, 1895 | Austin | Mower |
| 29th | | Sam Sweningsen | Republican | January 8, 1895 | January 2, 1899 | Austin | Mower |
| 30th | | Sam Sweningsen | Republican | January 8, 1895 | January 2, 1899 | Austin | Mower |
| 31st | | Allen J. Greer | Republican | January 3, 1899 | January 5, 1903 | Lake City | Wabasha |
| 32nd | | Allen J. Greer | Republican | January 3, 1899 | January 5, 1903 | Lake City | Wabasha |
| 33rd | | Lytle O. Cooke | Republican | January 6, 1903 | January 4, 1915 | Lake City | Wabasha |
| 34th | | Lytle O. Cooke | Republican | January 6, 1903 | January 4, 1915 | Lake City | Wabasha |
| 35th | | Lytle O. Cooke | Republican | January 6, 1903 | January 4, 1915 | Lake City | Wabasha |
| 36th | | Lytle O. Cooke | Republican | January 6, 1903 | January 4, 1915 | Lake City | Wabasha |
| 37th | | Lytle O. Cooke | Republican | January 6, 1903 | January 4, 1915 | Lake City | Wabasha |
| 38th | | Lytle O. Cooke | Republican | January 6, 1903 | January 4, 1915 | Lake City | Wabasha |
| 39th | | James A. Carley | Democratic | January 5, 1915 | January 5, 1931 | Plainview | Wabasha |
| 40th | | James A. Carley | Democratic | January 5, 1915 | January 5, 1931 | Plainview | Wabasha |
| 41st | | James A. Carley | Democratic | January 5, 1915 | January 5, 1931 | Plainview | Wabasha |
| 42nd | | James A. Carley | Democratic | January 5, 1915 | January 5, 1931 | Plainview | Wabasha |
| 43rd | | James A. Carley | Democratic | January 5, 1915 | January 5, 1931 | Plainview | Wabasha |
| 44th | | James A. Carley | Democratic | January 5, 1915 | January 5, 1931 | Plainview | Wabasha |
| 45th | | James A. Carley | Democratic | January 5, 1915 | January 5, 1931 | Plainview | Wabasha |
| 46th | | James A. Carley | Democratic | January 5, 1915 | January 5, 1931 | Plainview | Wabasha |
| 47th | | Blake C. Fisk, Sr. | Non-partisan | January 6, 1931 | January 7, 1935 | Wabasha | Wabasha |
| 48th | | Blake C. Fisk, Sr. | Non-partisan | January 6, 1931 | January 7, 1935 | Wabasha | Wabasha |
| 49th | | James A. Carley | Democratic | January 8, 1935 | May 14, 1952 | Plainview | Wabasha |
| 50th | | James A. Carley | Democratic | January 8, 1935 | May 14, 1952 | Plainview | Wabasha |
| 51st | | James A. Carley | Democratic | January 8, 1935 | May 14, 1952 | Plainview | Wabasha |
| 52nd | | James A. Carley | Democratic | January 8, 1935 | May 14, 1952 | Plainview | Wabasha |
| 53rd | | James A. Carley | Democratic | January 8, 1935 | May 14, 1952 | Plainview | Wabasha |
| 54th | | James A. Carley | DFL | January 8, 1935 | May 14, 1952 | Plainview | Wabasha |
| 55th | | James A. Carley | DFL | January 8, 1935 | May 14, 1952 | Plainview | Wabasha |
| 56th | | James A. Carley | DFL | January 8, 1935 | May 14, 1952 | Plainview | Wabasha |
| 57th | | James A. Carley | DFL | January 8, 1935 | May 14, 1952 | Plainview | Wabasha |
| 57th | Vacant | | May 14, 1952 | January 5, 1953 | | Plainview | Wabasha |
| 58th | | Robert R. Dunlap | Conservative | January 6, 1953 | January 2, 1967 | Plainview | Wabasha |
| 59th | | Robert R. Dunlap | Conservative | January 6, 1953 | January 2, 1967 | Plainview | Wabasha |
| 60th | | Robert R. Dunlap | Conservative | January 6, 1953 | January 2, 1967 | Plainview | Wabasha |
| 61st | | Robert R. Dunlap | Conservative | January 6, 1953 | January 2, 1967 | Plainview | Wabasha |
| 62nd | | Robert R. Dunlap | Conservative | January 6, 1953 | January 2, 1967 | Plainview | Wabasha |
| 63rd | | Robert R. Dunlap | Conservative | January 6, 1953 | January 2, 1967 | Plainview | Olmsted Wabasha |
| 64th | | Robert R. Dunlap | Conservative | January 6, 1953 | January 2, 1967 | Plainview | Olmsted Wabasha |
| 65th | | Cliff Sommer | Conservative | January 3, 1967 | January 4, 1971 | Owatonna | Dodge Olmsted Steele |
| 66th | | Cliff Sommer | Conservative | January 3, 1967 | January 4, 1971 | Owatonna | Dodge Olmsted Steele |
| 67th | | Mel Frederick | Conservative | January 5, 1971 | January 1, 1973 | West Concord | Dodge Olmsted Steele |
| 68th | | Norbert P. Arnold, Jr. | Liberal | January 2, 1973 | January 3, 1977 | Pengilly | Beltrami Itasca Koochiching |
| 69th | | Norbert P. Arnold, Jr. | Liberal | January 2, 1973 | January 3, 1977 | Pengilly | Beltrami Itasca Koochiching |
| 70th | | Bob Lessard | DFL | January 4, 1977 | January 2, 2001 | International Falls | Beltrami Itasca Koochiching |
| 71st | | Bob Lessard | DFL | January 4, 1977 | January 2, 2001 | International Falls | Beltrami Itasca Koochiching |
| 72nd | | Bob Lessard | DFL | January 4, 1977 | January 2, 2001 | International Falls | Beltrami Itasca Koochiching |
| 73rd | | Bob Lessard | DFL | January 4, 1977 | January 2, 2001 | International Falls | Itasca Koochiching |
| 74th | | Bob Lessard | DFL | January 4, 1977 | January 2, 2001 | International Falls | Itasca Koochiching |
| 75th | | Bob Lessard | DFL | January 4, 1977 | January 2, 2001 | International Falls | Itasca Koochiching |
| 76th | | Bob Lessard | DFL | January 4, 1977 | January 2, 2001 | International Falls | Itasca Koochiching |
| 77th | | Bob Lessard | DFL | January 4, 1977 | January 2, 2001 | International Falls | Itasca Koochiching |
| 78th | | Bob Lessard | DFL | January 4, 1977 | January 2, 2001 | International Falls | Aitkin Itasca Koochiching St. Louis |
| 79th | | Bob Lessard | DFL | January 4, 1977 | January 2, 2001 | International Falls | Aitkin Itasca Koochiching St. Louis |
| 80th | | Bob Lessard | DFL | January 4, 1977 | January 2, 2001 | International Falls | Aitkin Itasca Koochiching St. Louis |
| 81st | | Bob Lessard | DFL | January 4, 1977 | January 2, 2001 | International Falls | Aitkin Itasca Koochiching St. Louis |
| 82nd | | Bob Lessard | Independence | January 2, 2001 | January 6, 2003 | International Falls | Aitkin Itasca Koochiching St. Louis |
| 83rd | | Tom Saxhaug | DFL | January 7, 2003 | January 7, 2013 | Grand Rapids | Aitkin Itasca Koochiching Lake of the Woods |
| 84th | | Tom Saxhaug | DFL | January 7, 2003 | January 7, 2013 | Grand Rapids | Aitkin Itasca Koochiching Lake of the Woods |
| 85th | | Tom Saxhaug | DFL | January 7, 2003 | January 7, 2013 | Grand Rapids | Aitkin Itasca Koochiching Lake of the Woods |
| 86th | | Tom Saxhaug | DFL | January 7, 2003 | January 7, 2013 | Grand Rapids | Aitkin Itasca Koochiching Lake of the Woods |
| 87th | | Tom Saxhaug | DFL | January 7, 2003 | January 7, 2013 | Grand Rapids | Aitkin Itasca Koochiching Lake of the Woods |
| 88th | | Tom Bakk | DFL | January 8, 2013 | January 2, 2023 | Cook | Cook Koochiching Lake St. Louis |
| 89th | | Tom Bakk | DFL | January 8, 2013 | January 2, 2023 | Cook | Cook Koochiching Lake St. Louis |
| 90th | | Tom Bakk | DFL | January 8, 2013 | January 2, 2023 | Cook | Cook Koochiching Lake St. Louis |
| 91st | | Tom Bakk | Independent | January 8, 2013 | January 2, 2023 | Cook | Cook Koochiching Lake St. Louis |
| 92nd | | Tom Bakk | Independent | January 8, 2013 | January 2, 2023 | Cook | Cook Koochiching Lake St. Louis |
| 93rd | | Grant Hauschild | DFL | January 3, 2023 | Incumbent | Hermantown | Cook Itasca Koochiching Lake St. Louis |
