= Jacob H. Stewart =

American politician (1829–1884)

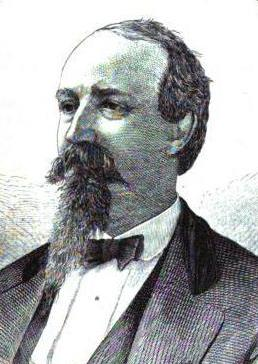

Member of the U.S. House of Representatives from Minnesota's 3rd district
- In office March 4, 1877 – March 3, 1879
- Preceded by: William S. King
- Succeeded by: William D. Washburn

Member of the Minnesota Senate from the 2nd district
- In office December 7, 1859 – January 7, 1861 Serving with William Sprigg Hall & Charles N. Mackubin
- Preceded by: Charles S. Cave
- Succeeded by: Joel K. Reiner

Personal details
- Born: Jacob Henry Stewart; January 15, 1829 Clermont, New York, U.S.
- Died: August 25, 1884 (aged 55) Saint Paul, Minnesota, U.S.
- Resting place: Oakland Cemetery, Saint Paul, Minnesota
- Party: Republican
- Education: University Medical College of New York City, Yale College, Phillips Academy
- Occupation: Physician

Jacob Henry Stewart (January 15, 1829 – August 25, 1884) was a representative for the U.S. state of Minnesota, a mayor of Saint Paul, and a Civil War veteran who served as the surgeon for the First Minnesota Volunteer Infantry Regiment.

== Early life and education ==
Stewart was born in Clermont, New York, on January 15, 1829. He moved with his parents to Peekskill, New York, where he attended the common schools and graduated from Phillips Academy. He then attended Yale College to study medicine and graduated from the University Medical College of New York City in 1851, returning to his hometown of Peekskill to practice medicine.

== Career ==
In 1855, Stewart moved to Saint Paul, Minnesota, becoming the medical officer of Ramsey County in 1856. He married Katharine Sweeny from Philadelphia, and their marriage certificate was witnessed by fellow Philadelphian Anna Jenks Ramsey, the wife of Governor Alexander Ramsey.

Stewart served as surgeon general of the State of Minnesota from 1857 to 1863. He was a member of the Minnesota Senate in 1858 and 1859.

=== Civil War ===
Stewart enlisted as a member of the First Minnesota Volunteer Infantry Regiment and served as a surgeon. During the First Battle of Bull Run, in which the regiment suffered the highest casualty rate of any Union regiment involved, Stewart stayed on the field after the battle to care for the wounded on both sides. He was taken prisoner by the Confederacy and surrendered his sword.

General P.G.T. Beauregard of the Confederacy heard of Stewart's conduct and returned his weapon. Stewart was held in Libby Prison in Richmond, Virginia. He received conditional parole and returned to Minnesota where he became post surgeon at Fort Snelling.

=== Post-war career ===
Stewart was mayor of Saint Paul in 1864, 1868, and 1872 – 1874, and also served as postmaster of Saint Paul from 1865 to 1870. In 1875, he ran for Governor of Minnesota. He lost the Republican primary to John S. Pillsbury.

In 1876, he was elected as a Republican to the 45th congress, serving from March 4, 1877, to March 3, 1879. After leaving office, he served as surveyor general of Minnesota from 1879 to 1882, then resumed the practice of medicine in Saint Paul.

Stewart continued to practice medicine after the war, partnering with Charles A. Wheaton. In 1872, Ramsey County purchased Stewart's mansion to serve as a hospital. In 1873 it was established as the St. Paul City and Ramsey County Hospital, eventually becoming Regions Hospital in 1977.

=== Later life ===
In 1874, the Stewart family moved to 50 Irvine Park, near the home of Alexander Ramsey.

He died on August 24, 1884, and is interred in Oakland Cemetery in St. Paul.

In 1928, when the Fort Snelling Memorial Chapel was constructed, Ursula and Charles Wheaton donated three stained glass windows as a memorial to Stewart.

U.S. House of Representatives
Preceded by William S. King	U.S. Representative from Minnesota's 3rd congressional district 1877 – 1879	Succeeded by William D. Washburn
