= 6th Minnesota Legislature =

1864 legislative session

Sixth Minnesota Legislature
←	5th Minnesota Legislature	7th Minnesota Legislature	→
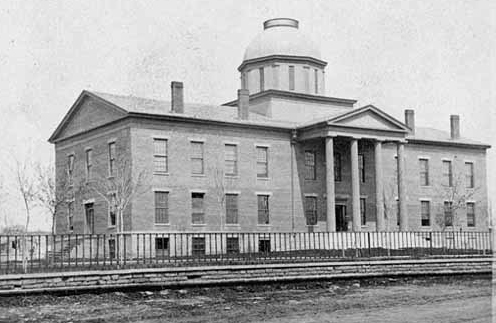

Overview
- Legislative body: Minnesota Legislature
- Jurisdiction: Minnesota, United States
- Term: January 5, 1864 – January 3, 1865
- Website: www.leg.state.mn.us

Minnesota State Senate
- Members: 21 Senators
- Lieutenant Governor: Charles D. Sherwood
- Party control: Republican Party

Minnesota House of Representatives
- Members: 42 Representatives
- Speaker: Jared Benson
- Party control: Republican Party

The sixth Minnesota Legislature first convened on January 5, 1864. The half of the 21 members of the Minnesota Senate who represented even-numbered districts were elected during the General Election of November 4, 1862, while the 42 members of the Minnesota House of Representatives and the other half of the members of the Minnesota Senate were elected during the General Election of November 3, 1863.

== Sessions ==
The legislature met in a regular session from January 5, 1864 to March 4, 1864. There were no special sessions of the 6th Minnesota Legislature.

== Party summary ==
=== Senate ===
	Party (Shading indicates majority caucus)		Total	Vacant
	Democratic	Republican	Total	Vacant
End of previous Legislature	5	16	21	0
Begin	4	17	21	0
Latest voting share	19%	81%		
Beginning of the next Legislature	4	17	21	0

=== House of Representatives ===
	Party (Shading indicates majority caucus)			Total	Vacant
	Democratic	Republican	Union Dem.	Total	Vacant
End of previous Legislature	12	29	1	40	2
Begin	11	27	4	42	0
Latest voting share	26%	64%	10%		
Beginning of the next Legislature	10	32	0	42	0

== Leadership ==
=== Senate ===
Lieutenant Governor
Charles D. Sherwood (R-Elkhorn)

=== House of Representatives ===
Speaker of the House
Jared Benson (R-Anoka)

== Members ==
=== Senate ===
Name	District	City	Party
Berry, John McDonogh	08	Faribault	Republican
Cameron, Daniel	13	La Crescent	Republican
Daniels, John V.	12	Rochester	Republican
Langley, Dudley F.	07	Hastings	Republican
Lincoln, Isaac	18	Shakopee	Democratic
McKusick, John	02	Stillwater	Republican
Miller, Luke	14	Chatfield	Republican
Morrison, Dorilus	05	Minneapolis	Republican
Nicols, John	21	Saint Paul	Republican
Norton, Daniel Sheldon	11	Winona	Republican
Ottman, R.	10	Lake City	Republican
Pillsbury, John Sargent	04	Saint Anthony	Republican
Porter, John J.	17	Mankato	Democratic
Rice, Edmund	01	Saint Paul	Democratic
Shillock, Daniel G.	20	New Ulm	Republican
Sprague, Benjamin D.	15	Lansing	Republican
Stevens, F. J.	16	Meriden	Republican
Swift, Henry Adoniram	19	Saint Peter	Republican
Thatcher, Joseph A.	09	Zumbrota	Republican
Warner, Charles A.	06	Chaska	Republican
Wilson, Joseph P.	03	Saint Cloud	Democratic

=== House of Representatives ===
Name	District	City	Party
Ackley, J. F.	07	Lakeville	Unknown
Armstrong, Thomas Henry	12	High Forest	Republican
Barlow, Augustus	15	Wasioja	Unknown
Benson, Jared	04	Anoka	Republican
Bullis, A. H.	08	Warsaw	Unknown
Butler, W. G.	06	Clearwater	Republican
Butters, Reuben	17	Kasota	Democratic
Coffin, Samuel	19	Nicollet	Unknown
Coleman, John A.	05	Tamarack	Unknown
Conniff, Thomas H.	13	Caledonia	Unknown
Crane, Royal	15	Mantorville	Unknown
Dixon, Thomas P.	11	Saratoga	Unknown
Ferrin, Jonathan	04	Sauk Rapids	Unknown
Fitz, Rudolph H.	01	Saint Paul	Unknown
Foster, Major J.	14	Forestville	Democratic
Gates, J. M.	09	Roscoe	Unknown
Gibbs, John La Porte	16	Geneva	Republican
Graham, Gilbert	05	Richfield	Unknown
Grannis, Sidney Smith	09	Red Wing	Unknown
Guiteau, Kendrick N.	07	West Saint Paul	Unknown
Henry, R. R.	02	Point Douglas	Unknown
Hill, Henry	06	Glencoe	Unknown
Huey, William	19	Traverse des Sioux	Republican
Hunt, S. A.	14	Spring Valley	Unknown
Johnson, Hugh	18	Cedar Lake	Unknown
Kidder, Jefferson Parish	01	Saint Paul	Democratic
Kiefer, Andrew Robert	21	Saint Paul	Republican
Latimer, Jacob A.	20	Winnebago City	Unknown
Letford, John S.	06	Carver	Republican
McKay, John J.	10	Plainview	Unknown
Meagher, John L.	17	Marysburg	Unknown
Moulton, Justin P.	12	Marion	Republican
Nourse, A. N.	08	Northfield	Unknown
Richardson, Reuben M.	03	Torah	Democratic
Rigby, W. T.	03	Clearwater	Unknown
Ruffee, C. A.	03	Crow Wing	Unknown
Smith, Ansel	02	Franconia	Republican
Soule, Jesse H.	02	Stillwater	Unknown
Whittemore, Reuben	14	Rushford	Unknown
Wiswell, James A.	17	Garden City	Democratic
Woodruff, Philo	16	Swavesey	Republican
Youmans, Earl S.	11	Winona	Republican

Preceded by Fifth Minnesota Legislature	Sixth Minnesota Legislature; 1864	Succeeded by Seventh Minnesota Legislature
