= 7th Minnesota Legislature =

1865 legislative session

Seventh Minnesota Legislature
←	6th Minnesota Legislature	8th Minnesota Legislature	→
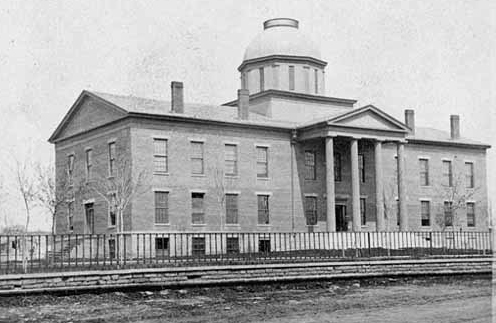

Overview
- Legislative body: Minnesota Legislature
- Jurisdiction: Minnesota, United States
- Term: January 3, 1865 – January 1, 1866
- Website: www.leg.state.mn.us

Minnesota State Senate
- Members: 21 Senators
- Lieutenant Governor: Charles D. Sherwood
- Party control: Republican Party

Minnesota House of Representatives
- Members: 42 Representatives
- Speaker: Thomas Henry Armstrong
- Party control: Republican Party

The seventh Minnesota Legislature first convened on January 3, 1865. The half of the 21 members of the Minnesota Senate who represented odd-numbered districts were elected during the General Election of November 3, 1863, while the 42 members of the Minnesota House of Representatives and the other half of the members of the Minnesota Senate were elected during the General Election of November 8, 1864.

== Sessions ==
The legislature met in a regular session from January 3, 1865 to March 3, 1865. There were no special sessions of the 7th Minnesota Legislature.

== Party summary ==
=== Senate ===
	Party (Shading indicates majority caucus)		Total	Vacant
	Democratic	Republican	Total	Vacant
End of previous Legislature	4	17	21	0
Begin	4	17	21	0
Latest voting share	19%	81%		
Beginning of the next Legislature	6	15	21	0

=== House of Representatives ===
	Party (Shading indicates majority caucus)			Total	Vacant
	Democratic	Republican	Union Dem.	Total	Vacant
End of previous Legislature	11	27	4	42	0
Begin	10	32	0	42	0
Latest voting share	24%	76%	0%		
Beginning of the next Legislature	13	29	0	42	0

== Leadership ==
=== Senate ===
Lieutenant Governor
Charles D. Sherwood (R-Elkhorn)

=== House of Representatives ===
Speaker of the House
Thomas Henry Armstrong (R-High Forest)

== Members ==
=== Senate ===
Name	District	City	Party
Baxter, Luthor Loren	18	Shakopee	Democratic
Cameron, Daniel	13	La Crescent	Republican
Daniels, John V.	12	Rochester	Republican
George, G. D.	06	Rockford	Republican
Langley, Dudley F.	07	Hastings	Republican
Lowell, Benjamin A.	16	Wilton	Republican
McKusick, John	02	Stillwater	Republican
Miller, Luke	14	Chatfield	Republican
Morrison, Dorilus	05	Minneapolis	Republican
Nicols, John	21	Saint Paul	Republican
Norton, Daniel Sheldon	11	Winona	Republican
Nutting, Levi	08	Faribault	Republican
Pillsbury, John Sargent	04	Saint Anthony	Republican
Porter, John J.	17	Mankato	Democratic
Rice, Edmund	01	Saint Paul	Democratic
Shillock, Daniel G.	20	New Ulm	Republican
Smith, Melville C.	10	Lake City	Republican
Sprague, Benjamin D.	15	Lansing	Republican
Swift, Henry Adoniram	19	Saint Peter	Republican
Thatcher, Joseph A.	09	Zumbrota	Republican
Wilson, Joseph P.	03	Saint Cloud	Democratic

=== House of Representatives ===
Name	District	City	Party
Aldrich, Cyrus	05	Minneapolis	Republican
Armstrong, Thomas Henry	12	High Forest	Republican
Beatty, Hamilton	19	Dryden	Democratic
Bullis, A. H.	08	Warsaw	Republican
Chalfant, William	14	Carimona	Republican
Colvill, Jr., William J.	09	Red Wing	Democratic
Cornell, Francis R.E.	05	Minneapolis	Republican
Crane, Royal	15	Mantorville	Republican
Crooker, Josiah B.	16	Owatonna	Republican
Davis, Charles F.	06	Kingston	Republican
Downer, John B.	10	Wabasha	Republican
Evans, Louis A.	03	Saint Cloud	Democratic
Gibbs, John La Porte	16	Geneva	Republican
Gilfillan, Charles Duncan	01	Saint Paul	Republican
Gilman, John M.	21	Saint Paul	Democratic
Goodrich, Frederick N.	13	Money Creek	Republican
Griswold, Charles	11	Saint Charles	Republican
Guiteau, Kendrick N.	07	West Saint Paul	Democratic
Harrington, L. C.	17	Mankato	Republican
Hewson, Stephen	04	Oxford	Republican
Hill, Henry	06	Glencoe	Republican
Huntoon, Lucius A.	02	Lakeland	Republican
Jay, Stephen H.	18	Saint Lawrence	Republican
Kiester, Jacob A.	20	Blue Earth City	Republican
Locke, J. B.	09	Minneola	Republican
Patten, William H.	17	Le Sueur	Republican
Peckham, John A.	01	Saint Paul	Democratic
Poehler, Henry	19	Henderson	Democratic
Renz, F. A.	06	Chaska	Republican
Rigby, W. T.	03	Clearwater	Democratic
Rogers, Luther Z.	17	Waterville	Republican
Shandrew, F. E.	11	Winona	Republican
Smith, Ansel	02	Franconia	Republican
Stark, Lars Johan	02	Centre City	Republican
Stowell, F. M.	04	Anoka	Republican
Taylor, Charles	08	Northfield	Republican
Taylor, Oscar	03	Saint Cloud	Democratic
Teachout, William	12	Little Valley	Republican
Tew, Henry W.	07	Northfield	Democratic
Tuthill, Charles D.	15	Ashland	Republican
West, Elijah F.	14	Newburg	Republican
Whittemore, Reuben	14	Rushford	Republican

Preceded by Sixth Minnesota Legislature	Seventh Minnesota Legislature; 1865	Succeeded by Eighth Minnesota Legislature
