= Senator Lowry =

Senator Lowry may refer to:

- J. A. W. Lowry (1848–1899), Louisiana State Senate
- Robert Lowry (governor) (1829–1910), Mississippi State Senate
- Sylvanus Lowry (1824–1865), Minnesota State Senate

== See also ==
- Walter Lowrie (politician) (1784–1868), U.S. Senator from Pennsylvania from 1825 to 1836
