= Senator Gilfillan =

Senator Gilfillan may refer to:

- Charles Duncan Gilfillan (1831–1902), Minnesota State Senate
- John Gilfillan (1835–1924), Minnesota State Senate
