= Meriden Township =

Meriden Township may refer to the following townships in the United States:

- Meriden Township, LaSalle County, Illinois
- Meriden Township, Steele County, Minnesota
