= Minnesota's 2nd Senate district =

American legislative district

Minnesota's 2nd State Senate district
Senator
| Steve Green; R–Park Rapids |
since 2023
- Demographics: 79.6% White; 0.4% Black; 2.4% Hispanic; 0.5% Asian; 13.8% Native American <0.1% Hawaiian/Pacific Islander; 0.3% Other; 5% Multiracial
- Population (2020): 80,696

The Minnesota Senate, District 2, encompasses the North-Central part of Minnesota. It stretches from Lake of the Woods County south to the White Earth Indian Reservation. It includes all or portions of Becker, Beltrami, Clearwater, Hubbard, Lake of the Woods, Mahnomen, Otter Tail and Wadena counties. It is currently represented by Republican Steve Green.

== Current elected officials ==
Republican Steve Green is the senator representing the 2nd district. He was first elected in 2022.

Each Minnesota State Senate district is composed of two Minnesota House of Representatives districts. The 1st district comprises House districts 1A and 1B. The current representatives of those districts are:

- House District 2A: Bidal Duran Jr. (R–Princeton)
- House District 2B: Matt Bliss (R–Pennington)

== List of senators ==
| Session | Image | Senator | Party | Term start | Term end | Home | Location |
|---|---|---|---|---|---|---|---|
| 1st | | Charles S. Cave | Democratic | December 2, 1857 | December 6, 1859 | St. Paul | Ramsey |
| 1st | | Isaac Van Etten | Democratic | December 2, 1857 | December 6, 1859 | St. Paul | Ramsey |
| 1st | | William Sprigg Hall | Democratic | December 2, 1857 | January 7, 1861 | St. Paul | Ramsey |
| 2nd | | William Sprigg Hall | Democratic | December 2, 1857 | January 7, 1861 | St. Paul | Ramsey |
| 3rd | | Joel K. Reiner | Republican | January 8, 1861 | January 5, 1863 | Marine-on-St. Croix | Chisago Kanabec Pine Washington |
| 4th | | Joel K. Reiner | Republican | January 8, 1861 | January 5, 1863 | Marine-on-St. Croix | Chisago Kanabec Pine Washington |
| 5th | | John McKusick | Non-partisan | January 6, 1863 | January 7, 1867 | Stillwater | Chisago Kanabec Pine Washington |
| 6th | | John McKusick | Non-partisan | January 6, 1863 | January 7, 1867 | Stillwater | Chisago Kanabec Pine Washington |
| 7th | | John McKusick | Non-partisan | January 6, 1863 | January 7, 1867 | Stillwater | Chisago Kanabec Pine Washington |
| 8th | | John McKusick | Non-partisan | January 6, 1863 | January 7, 1867 | Stillwater | Chisago Kanabec Pine Washington |
| 9th | | William Henry Carman Folsom | Republican | January 8, 1867 | January 4, 1869 | Taylors Falls | Chisago Kanabec Pine Washington |
| 10th | | William Henry Carman Folsom | Republican | January 8, 1867 | January 4, 1869 | Taylors Falls | Chisago Kanabec Pine Washington |
| 11th | | James Nathan Castle | Democratic | January 5, 1869 | January 2, 1871 | Stillwater | Chisago Kanabec Pine Washington |
| 12th | | James Nathan Castle | Democratic | January 5, 1869 | January 2, 1871 | Stillwater | Chisago Kanabec Pine Washington |
| 13th | | Dwight M. Sabin | Republican | January 3, 1871 | January 1, 1872 | Stillwater | Chisago Kanabec Pine Washington |
| 14th | | Thomas H. Everts | Republican | January 2, 1872 | January 5, 1874 | Rushford | Fillmore |
| 15th | | Thomas H. Everts | Republican | January 2, 1872 | January 5, 1874 | Rushford | Fillmore |
| 16th | | Charles Henry Conkey | Republican | January 6, 1874 | January 7, 1878 | Preston | Fillmore |
| 17th | | Charles Henry Conkey | Republican | January 6, 1874 | January 7, 1878 | Preston | Fillmore |
| 18th | | Charles Henry Conkey | Republican | January 6, 1874 | January 7, 1878 | Preston | Fillmore |
| 19th | | Charles Henry Conkey | Republican | January 6, 1874 | January 7, 1878 | Preston | Fillmore |
| 20th | | James M. Wheat | Republican | January 8, 1878 | January 3, 1877 | Lenora | Fillmore |
| 21st | | James M. Wheat | Republican | January 8, 1878 | January 3, 1877 | Lenora | Fillmore |
| 22nd | | James M. Wheat | Republican | January 8, 1878 | January 3, 1877 | Lenora | Fillmore |
| 23rd | | James M. Wheat | Republican | January 8, 1878 | January 3, 1877 | Lenora | Fillmore |
| 24th | | James M. Wheat | Republican | January 8, 1878 | January 3, 1877 | Lenora | Fillmore |
| 25th | | Charles G. Edwards | Republican | January 4, 1887 | January 5, 1891 | Spring Valley | Fillmore |
| 26th | | Charles G. Edwards | Republican | January 4, 1887 | January 5, 1891 | Spring Valley | Fillmore |
| 27th | | Evin D. Hammer | Republican | January 6, 1891 | January 7, 1895 | Pilot Mound | Fillmore |
| 28th | | Evin D. Hammer | Republican | January 6, 1891 | January 7, 1895 | Pilot Mound | Fillmore |
| 29th | | Richard Enos Johnson | Republican | January 8, 1895 | January 2, 1899 | Preston | Fillmore |
| 30th | | Richard Enos Johnson | Republican | January 8, 1895 | January 2, 1899 | Preston | Fillmore |
| 31st | | Patrick Fitzpatrick | Democratic | January 3, 1899 | August 31, 1908 | Winona | Winona |
| 32nd | | Patrick Fitzpatrick | Democratic | January 3, 1899 | August 31, 1908 | Winona | Winona |
| 33rd | | Patrick Fitzpatrick | Democratic | January 3, 1899 | August 31, 1908 | Winona | Winona |
| 34th | | Patrick Fitzpatrick | Democratic | January 3, 1899 | August 31, 1908 | Winona | Winona |
| 35th | | Patrick Fitzpatrick | Democratic | January 3, 1899 | August 31, 1908 | Winona | Winona |
| 35th | | Vacant | | August 31, 1908 | January 5, 1909 | | Winona |
| 36th | | George D. French | Republican | January 5, 1909 | January 2, 1911 | St. Charles | Winona |
| 37th | | M.J. McGrath | Democratic | January 3, 1911 | January 4, 1915 | Winona | Winona |
| 38th | | M.J. McGrath | Democratic | January 3, 1911 | January 4, 1915 | Winona | Winona |
| 39th | | Samuel M. Knopp | Democratic | January 5, 1915 | January 6, 1919 | Winona | Winona |
| 40th | | Samuel M. Knopp | Democratic | January 5, 1915 | January 6, 1919 | Winona | Winona |
| 41st | | Herbert W. Kingsbury | Non-partisan | January 7, 1919 | January 1, 1923 | Winona | Winona |
| 42nd | | Herbert W. Kingsbury | Non-partisan | January 7, 1919 | January 1, 1923 | Winona | Winona |
| 43rd | | John Frisch | Non-partisan | January 2, 1923 | January 3, 1927 | St. Charles | Winona |
| 44th | | John Frisch | Non-partisan | January 2, 1923 | January 3, 1927 | St. Charles | Winona |
| 45th | | Henry Steen | Democratic | January 4, 1927 | July 27, 1928 | Winona | Winona |
| 45th | | Vacant | | July 27, 1928 | January 4, 1929 | | Winona |
| 46th | | Frederick H. Rollins | Non-partisan | January 4, 1929 | January 7, 1935 | St. Charles | Winona |
| 47th | | Frederick H. Rollins | Non-partisan | January 4, 1929 | January 7, 1935 | St. Charles | Winona |
| 48th | | Frederick H. Rollins | Non-partisan | January 4, 1929 | January 7, 1935 | St. Charles | Winona |
| 49th | | Michael J. Galvin, Sr. | Non-partisan | January 8, 1935 | January 6, 1947 | Winona | Winona |
| 50th | | Michael J. Galvin, Sr. | Non-partisan | January 8, 1935 | January 6, 1947 | Winona | Winona |
| 51st | | Michael J. Galvin, Sr. | Non-partisan | January 8, 1935 | January 6, 1947 | Winona | Winona |
| 52nd | | Michael J. Galvin, Sr. | Non-partisan | January 8, 1935 | January 6, 1947 | Winona | Winona |
| 53rd | | Michael J. Galvin, Sr. | Non-partisan | January 8, 1935 | January 6, 1947 | Winona | Winona |
| 54th | | Michael J. Galvin, Sr. | Non-partisan | January 8, 1935 | January 6, 1947 | Winona | Winona |
| 55th | | Len Dernek | Non-partisan | January 7, 1947 | January 1, 1951 | Winona | Winona |
| 56th | | Len Dernek | Non-partisan | January 7, 1947 | January 1, 1951 | Winona | Winona |
| 56th | | Jim Keller | Conservative | January 2, 1951 | January 7, 1963 | Rollingstone | Winona |
| 57th | | Jim Keller | Conservative | January 2, 1951 | January 7, 1963 | Rollingstone | Winona |
| 58th | | Jim Keller | Conservative | January 2, 1951 | January 7, 1963 | Rollingstone | Winona |
| 59th | | Jim Keller | Conservative | January 2, 1951 | January 7, 1963 | Rollingstone | Winona |
| 60th | | Jim Keller | Conservative | January 2, 1951 | January 7, 1963 | Rollingstone | Winona |
| 61st | | Jim Keller | Conservative | January 2, 1951 | January 7, 1963 | Rollingstone | Winona |
| 62nd | | Jim Keller | Conservative | January 2, 1951 | January 7, 1963 | Rollingstone | Winona |
| 63rd | | Roger A. Laufenburger | Liberal | January 8, 1963 | January 2, 1973 | Lewiston | Olmsted Wabasha Winona |
| 64th | | Roger A. Laufenburger | Liberal | January 8, 1963 | January 2, 1973 | Lewiston | Olmsted Wabasha Winona |
| 65th | | Roger A. Laufenburger | Liberal | January 8, 1963 | January 2, 1973 | Lewiston | Olmsted Wabasha Winona |
| 66th | | Roger A. Laufenburger | Liberal | January 8, 1963 | January 2, 1973 | Lewiston | Olmsted Wabasha Winona |
| 67th | | Roger A. Laufenburger | Liberal | January 8, 1963 | January 2, 1973 | Lewiston | Olmsted Wabasha Winona |
| 68th | | Roger D. Moe | DFL | January 2, 1973 | January 7, 2003 | Erskine | Becker Beltrami Clearwater Hubbard Lake of the Woods Mahnomen Norman Otter Tail Pennington Polk Wadena |
| 69th | | Roger D. Moe | DFL | January 2, 1973 | January 7, 2003 | Erskine | Becker Beltrami Clearwater Hubbard Lake of the Woods Mahnomen Norman Otter Tail Pennington Polk Wadena |
| 70th | | Roger D. Moe | DFL | January 2, 1973 | January 7, 2003 | Erskine | Becker Beltrami Clearwater Hubbard Lake of the Woods Mahnomen Norman Otter Tail Pennington Polk Wadena |
| 71st | | Roger D. Moe | DFL | January 2, 1973 | January 7, 2003 | Erskine | Becker Beltrami Clearwater Hubbard Lake of the Woods Mahnomen Norman Otter Tail Pennington Polk Wadena |
| 72nd | | Roger D. Moe | DFL | January 2, 1973 | January 7, 2003 | Erskine | Becker Beltrami Clearwater Hubbard Lake of the Woods Mahnomen Norman Otter Tail Pennington Polk Wadena |
| 73rd | | Roger D. Moe | DFL | January 2, 1973 | January 7, 2003 | Erskine | Becker Beltrami Clearwater Hubbard Lake of the Woods Mahnomen Norman Otter Tail Pennington Polk Wadena |
| 74th | | Roger D. Moe | DFL | January 2, 1973 | January 7, 2003 | Erskine | Becker Beltrami Clearwater Hubbard Lake of the Woods Mahnomen Norman Otter Tail Pennington Polk Wadena |
| 75th | | Roger D. Moe | DFL | January 2, 1973 | January 7, 2003 | Erskine | Becker Beltrami Clearwater Hubbard Lake of the Woods Mahnomen Norman Otter Tail Pennington Polk Wadena |
| 76th | | Roger D. Moe | DFL | January 2, 1973 | January 7, 2003 | Erskine | Becker Beltrami Clearwater Hubbard Lake of the Woods Mahnomen Norman Otter Tail Pennington Polk Wadena |
| 77th | | Roger D. Moe | DFL | January 2, 1973 | January 7, 2003 | Erskine | Becker Beltrami Clearwater Hubbard Lake of the Woods Mahnomen Norman Otter Tail Pennington Polk Wadena |
| 78th | | Roger D. Moe | DFL | January 2, 1973 | January 7, 2003 | Erskine | Becker Beltrami Clearwater Hubbard Lake of the Woods Mahnomen Norman Otter Tail Pennington Polk Wadena |
| 79th | | Roger D. Moe | DFL | January 2, 1973 | January 7, 2003 | Erskine | Becker Beltrami Clearwater Hubbard Lake of the Woods Mahnomen Norman Otter Tail Pennington Polk Wadena |
| 80th | | Roger D. Moe | DFL | January 2, 1973 | January 7, 2003 | Erskine | Becker Beltrami Clearwater Hubbard Lake of the Woods Mahnomen Norman Otter Tail Pennington Polk Wadena |
| 81st | | Roger D. Moe | DFL | January 2, 1973 | January 7, 2003 | Erskine | Becker Beltrami Clearwater Hubbard Lake of the Woods Mahnomen Norman Otter Tail Pennington Polk Wadena |
| 82nd | | Roger D. Moe | DFL | January 2, 1973 | January 7, 2003 | Erskine | Becker Beltrami Clearwater Hubbard Lake of the Woods Mahnomen Norman Otter Tail Pennington Polk Wadena |
| 83rd | | Rod Skoe | DFL | January 3, 2003 | January 3, 2017 | Clearbrook | Becker Beltrami Clearwater Hubbard Lake of the Woods Mahnomen Norman Otter Tail Pennington Polk Wadena |
| 84th | | Rod Skoe | DFL | January 3, 2003 | January 3, 2017 | Clearbrook | Becker Beltrami Clearwater Hubbard Lake of the Woods Mahnomen Norman Otter Tail Pennington Polk Wadena |
| 85th | | Rod Skoe | DFL | January 3, 2003 | January 3, 2017 | Clearbrook | Becker Beltrami Clearwater Hubbard Lake of the Woods Mahnomen Norman Otter Tail Pennington Polk Wadena |
| 86th | | Rod Skoe | DFL | January 3, 2003 | January 3, 2017 | Clearbrook | Becker Beltrami Clearwater Hubbard Lake of the Woods Mahnomen Norman Otter Tail Pennington Polk Wadena |
| 87th | | Rod Skoe | DFL | January 3, 2003 | January 3, 2017 | Clearbrook | Becker Beltrami Clearwater Hubbard Lake of the Woods Mahnomen Norman Otter Tail Pennington Polk Wadena |
| 88th | | Rod Skoe | DFL | January 3, 2003 | January 3, 2017 | Clearbrook | Becker Beltrami Clearwater Hubbard Lake of the Woods Mahnomen Norman Otter Tail Pennington Polk Wadena |
| 89th | | Rod Skoe | DFL | January 3, 2003 | January 3, 2017 | Clearbrook | Becker Beltrami Clearwater Hubbard Lake of the Woods Mahnomen Norman Otter Tail Pennington Polk Wadena |
| 90th | | Paul Utke | Republican | January 3, 2017 | January 3, 2023 | Park Rapids | Becker Beltrami Clearwater Hubbard Lake of the Woods Mahnomen Norman Otter Tail Pennington Polk Wadena |
| 91st | | Paul Utke | Republican | January 3, 2017 | January 3, 2023 | Park Rapids | Becker Beltrami Clearwater Hubbard Lake of the Woods Mahnomen Norman Otter Tail Pennington Polk Wadena |
| 92nd | | Paul Utke | Republican | January 3, 2017 | January 3, 2023 | Park Rapids | Becker Beltrami Clearwater Hubbard Lake of the Woods Mahnomen Norman Otter Tail Pennington Polk Wadena |
| 93rd | | Steve Green | Republican | January 3, 2023 | Incumbent | Foston | Becker Beltrami Clearwater Hubbard Lake of the Woods Mahnomen Norman Otter Tail Pennington Polk Wadena |
| 94th | | Steve Green | Republican | January 3, 2023 | Incumbent | Foston | Becker Beltrami Clearwater Hubbard Lake of the Woods Mahnomen Norman Otter Tail Pennington Polk Wadena |
