= Joel K. Reiner =

American physician and politician (1811–1874)

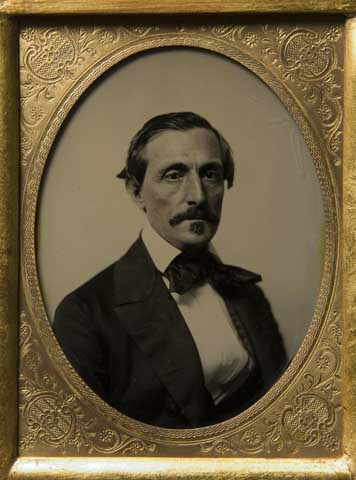
- Reiner c. 1858

Member of the Minnesota Senate from the 1st District
- In office December 2, 1857 – December 6, 1859 Serving with Hewitt L. Thomas
- Governor: Samuel Medary
- Succeeded by: William McKusick; Socrates Nelson

Member of the Minnesota Senate from the 2nd District
- In office January 8, 1861 – January 5, 1863
- Governor: Alexander Ramsey
- Preceded by: William Sprigg Hall
- Succeeded by: John McKusick

Personal details
- Born: March 11, 1812 Line Lexington, Pennsylvania U.S.
- Died: January 20, 1874 (aged 61) Stillwater, Minnesota, U.S.
- Education: Jefferson Medical College

Joel K. Reiner (March 11, 1812 – January 7, 1874) was an American physician and politician. Reiner served three nonconsecutive terms in the Minnesota Senate.

== Early life and career ==
Reiner was born on March 11, 1812 in Line Lexington, Pennsylvania to parents David Reiner and Elizabeth Reiner. Reiner graduated from Jefferson Medical College in Philadelphia in 1835 before moving to Collinsville, Illinois in Madison County, Illinois where he practiced medicine. Reiner eventually moved to Minnesota Territory in 1852 and settled in Stillwater, Minnesota. By the summer of 1855 Reiner was practicing medicine in Stillwater.

== Politics ==
Reiner was elected to the Minnesota Senate on October 13, 1857 and represented Minnesota's 1st Senate district which included Washington County, Minnesota. Reiner served in the 1st Minnesota Legislature from December 2, 1857 to December 6, 1859. During his term Reiner served on the Agriculture and Manufactures Committee and the Printing Committee.

Reiner was later elected on November 6, 1860 to serve two term in the Minnesota Senate as part of the 3rd Minnesota Legislature and the 4th Minnesota Legislature from January 8, 1861 to January 5, 1863 representing Minnesota's 2nd Senate district. During his second term Reiner was the chair of the Ways and Means Committee and the Printing Committee, he was also a member of the Public Buildings, Railroads and Railroad Grants, and the Minnesota State Prison Committees. Reiner was later the physician for the Minnesota State Prison.

== Later life and death ==
Following his role in politics, Reiner continued to work in Stillwater as a physician. Reiner died on January 20, 1874 in Stillwater from sepsis after cutting himself while conducting surgery on a patient infected with sepsis.

== Personal life ==
Reiner was married to Eliza C. Berkey on April 8, 1842. Reiner was a follower of Presbyterianism.
