= 4th Minnesota Legislature =

1862 legislative session

Fourth Minnesota Legislature
←	3rd Minnesota Legislature	5th Minnesota Legislature	→
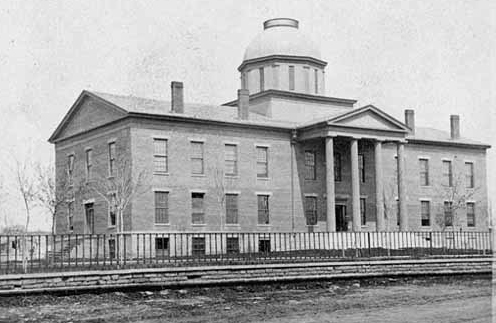

Overview
- Legislative body: Minnesota Legislature
- Jurisdiction: Minnesota, United States
- Term: January 7, 1862 – January 6, 1863
- Website: www.leg.state.mn.us

Minnesota State Senate
- Members: 21 Senators
- Lieutenant Governor: Ignatius L. Donnelly
- Party control: Republican Party

Minnesota House of Representatives
- Members: 42 Representatives
- Speaker: Jared Benson
- Party control: Republican Party

The fourth Minnesota Legislature first convened on January 7, 1862. The half of the 21 members of the Minnesota Senate who represented even-numbered districts were elected during the General Election of November 6, 1860, while the 42 members of the Minnesota House of Representatives and the other half of the members of the Minnesota Senate were elected during the General Election of October 8, 1861.

== Sessions ==
The legislature met in a regular session from January 7, 1862 to March 7, 1862. A special session of the legislature was convened from September 9, 1862 to September 29, 1862 in response to the Dakota War of 1862, to consider such matters as suffrage for military personnel, the organization and equipment of the militia, and regulations concerning the sale of alcoholic beverages to Native Americans.

== Party summary ==
Resignations and new members are discussed in the "Membership changes" section, below.

=== Senate ===
	Party (Shading indicates majority caucus)		Total	Vacant
	Democratic	Republican	Total	Vacant
End of previous Legislature	2	14	16	5
Begin	5	16	21	0
February 22, 1862 (Note: The exact date on which Sylvanus Lowry ceased to be a member of the Senate is uncertain. In lieu of a precise date, Minnesota Legislators Past & Present lists February 22, 1862—the last date on which Lowry's name is listed in the Minnesota Journal of the Senate.)	4	16	20	1
September 10, 1862	5	16	21	0
Latest voting share	24%	76%		
Beginning of the next Legislature	5	16	21	0

=== House of Representatives ===
	Party (Shading indicates majority caucus)			Total	Vacant
	Democratic	Republican	Union Dem.	Total	Vacant
End of previous Legislature	2	38	0	40	2
Begin	10	30	2	42	0
Latest voting share	24%	71%	5%		
Beginning of the next Legislature	12	29	1	42	0

== Leadership ==
=== Senate ===
Lieutenant Governor
Ignatius L. Donnelly (R-Nininger)

=== House of Representatives ===
Speaker of the House
Jared Benson (R-Anoka)

== Members ==
=== Senate ===
Name	District	City	Party
Baldwin, Rufus J.	05	Minneapolis	Republican
Bennett, Samuel	06	Monticello	Republican
Clark, Joseph H.	15	Claremont	Republican
Cleveland, Guy K.	20	Winnebago City	Republican
Cook, Michael	08	Faribault	Republican
Dane, Nathan	17	Ottawa	Democratic
Daniels, John V.	12	Rochester	Republican
Duffy, Thomas J.	18	Shakopee	Democratic
Heaton, David	04	Saint Anthony	Republican
Irvine, John R.	21	Saint Paul	Democratic
Lowry, Sylvanus B.	03	Saint Cloud	Democratic
McClure, Charles	09	Red Wing	Republican
Miller, Luke	14	Chatfield	Republican
Moore, William S.	03	Saint Cloud	Democratic
Nash, Charles W.	07	Hastings	Democratic
Reiner, Joel K.	02	Marine	Republican
Richards, Linus	10	Reads Landing	Republican
Sargeant, M. Wheeler	11	Winona	Republican
See, Charles H.	13	Brownsville	Republican
Smith, James K.	01	Saint Paul	Republican
Swift, Henry Adoniram	19	Saint Peter	Republican
Webber, Alfred B.	16	Albert Lea	Republican

=== House of Representatives ===
Name	District	City	Party
Aaker, Lars K.	09	Alexandria	Republican
Aiken, Samuel	13	Spring Grove	Republican
Allen, John H.	04	Princeton	Republican
Bailey, Philo C.	13	Waseca	Republican
Benson, Jared	04	Anoka	Republican
Bostwick, S. W.	15	Frankford	Republican
Buck, Adam	19	Henderson	Republican
Burt, William H.	02	Stillwater	Republican
Butler, A. H.	14	Newburg	Republican
Carver, Henry L.	01	Saint Paul	Union Dem.
Chamberlain, George C.	07	Lewiston	Democratic
Clossen, Caleb	08	Cannon City	Republican
Cornell, Francis R.E.	05	Minneapolis	Republican
Couper, John C.	07	Lewiston	Republican
Ford, Orville D.	10	Mazeppa	Republican
Gross, Nicholas	21	Saint Paul	Union Dem.
Harris, Thomas	12	Chatfield	Republican
Johnson, F.	12	Quincy	Republican
Kempfer, Bernard O.	20	Madelia	Republican
Kennedy, R. M.	06	Young America	Republican
Kennedy, Vincent P.	06	Greenleaf	Republican
Magoon, Henry C.	16	Owatonna	Republican
McGrew, John	14	Chatfield	Republican
McMullen, Nathan M.D.	18	Shakopee	Democratic
Past, John Comly	05	Industriana	Republican
Perry, T. M.	17	Cleveland	Democratic
Peterson, Peter	14	Rushford	Republican
Porter, John J.	17	Mankato	Democratic
Richardson, Reuben M.	03	Torah	Democratic
Rogers, Henry C.	15	Mower City	Republican
Rohr, Philip	01	Saint Paul	Democratic
Roy, Peter	03	Little Falls	Democratic
Severance, Martin J.	19	Henderson	Republican
Sheardown, Samuel B.	11	Stockton	Republican
Stevens, John Harrington	06	Glencoe	Democratic
Thacher, Joseph A.	09	Zumbrota	Republican
Hewitt L. Thomas	02	Afton	Republican
Weld, E. B.	11	Worth	Republican
Whipple, John	03	Duluth	Democratic
Whiting, Erastus D.	02	Taylors Falls	Republican
Wiswell, James A.	17	Garden City	Democratic
Woodruff, George S.	08	Faribault	Republican

== Membership changes ==
=== Senate ===
District	Vacated by	Reason for change	Successor	Date successor seated
03	Sylvanus Lowry (D)	Left office under unknown circumstances on date uncertain.	William S. Moore (D)	September 10, 1862

== Notes ==
Preceded by Third Minnesota Legislature	Fourth Minnesota Legislature; 1862	Succeeded by Fifth Minnesota Legislature
