= 5th Minnesota Legislature =

1863 legislative session

Fifth Minnesota Legislature
←	4th Minnesota Legislature	6th Minnesota Legislature	→
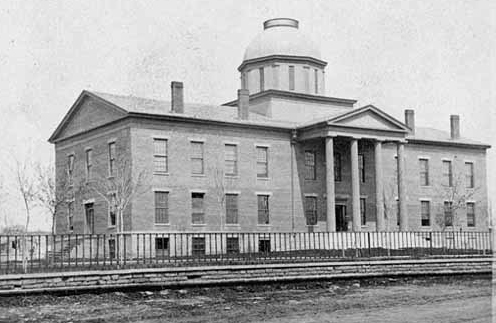

Overview
- Legislative body: Minnesota Legislature
- Jurisdiction: Minnesota, United States
- Term: January 6, 1863 – January 5, 1864
- Website: www.leg.state.mn.us

Minnesota State Senate
- Members: 21 Senators
- Lieutenant Governor: Ignatius L. Donnelly
- Party control: Republican Party

Minnesota House of Representatives
- Members: 42 Representatives
- Speaker: Charles D. Sherwood
- Party control: Republican Party

The fifth Minnesota Legislature first convened on January 6, 1863. The half of the 21 members of the Minnesota Senate who represented odd-numbered districts were elected during the General Election of October 8, 1861, while the 42 members of the Minnesota House of Representatives and the other half of the members of the Minnesota Senate were elected during the General Election of November 4, 1862.

== Sessions ==
The legislature met in a regular session from January 6, 1863 to March 6, 1863. There were no special sessions of the 5th Minnesota Legislature.

== Party summary ==
=== Senate ===
	Party (Shading indicates majority caucus)		Total	Vacant
	Democratic	Republican	Total	Vacant
End of previous Legislature	5	16	21	0
Begin	5	16	21	0
Latest voting share	24%	76%		
Beginning of the next Legislature	4	17	21	0

=== House of Representatives ===
	Party (Shading indicates majority caucus)			Total	Vacant
	Democratic	Republican	Union Dem.	Total	Vacant
End of previous Legislature	10	30	2	40	2
Begin	12	29	1	42	0
Latest voting share	29%	69%	2%		
Beginning of the next Legislature	11	27	4	42	0

== Leadership ==
=== Senate ===
Lieutenant Governor
Ignatius L. Donnelly (R-Nininger)

=== House of Representatives ===
Speaker of the House
Charles D. Sherwood (R-Elkhorn)

== Members ==
=== Senate ===
Name	District	City	Party
Baldwin, Rufus J.	05	Minneapolis	Republican
Berry, John McDonogh	08	Faribault	Republican
Clark, Joseph H.	15	Claremont	Republican
Dailey, Mervin A.	16	Owatonna	Republican
Dane, Nathan	17	Ottawa	Democratic
Daniels, John V.	12	Rochester	Republican
Heaton, David	04	Saint Anthony	Republican
Irvine, John R.	21	Saint Paul	Democratic
Lincoln, Isaac	18	Shakopee	Democratic
McClure, Charles	09	Red Wing	Republican
McKusick, John	02	Stillwater	Republican
Miller, Luke	14	Chatfield	Republican
Moore, William S.	03	Saint Cloud	Democratic
Nash, Charles W.	07	Hastings	Democratic
Ottman, R.	10	Lake City	Republican
Sargeant, M. Wheeler	11	Winona	Republican
See, Charles H.	13	Brownsville	Republican
Shillock, Daniel G.	20	New Ulm	Republican
Smith, James K.	01	Saint Paul	Republican
Swift, Henry Adoniram	19	Saint Peter	Republican
Warner, Charles A.	06	Chaska	Republican

=== House of Representatives ===
Name	District	City	Party
Austin, Adin C.	05	Osseo	Republican
Bacon, Samuel P.	15	Le Roy	Democratic
Bentley, L. R.	03	Fort Abercrombie	Republican
Brisbin, John B.	21	Saint Paul	Democratic
Buell, David L.	13	Caledonia	Democratic
Butler, W. G.	06	Clearwater	Republican
Butters, Reuben	17	Kasota	Democratic
Campbell, Samuel L.	10	Wabasha	Union Dem.
Chalfant, William	14	Carimona	Republican
Chamberlain, George C.	07	Lewiston	Democratic
Croswell, H. J. G.	04	Elk River	Republican
Davis, Charles F.	06	Kingston	Republican
Furber, Samuel W.	02	Cottage Grove	Republican
Handerson, Zabina	12	Salem	Republican
Hayes, Oren T.	07	Hastings	Republican
Hilton, Addison	09	Kenyon	Republican
Huey, William	19	Traverse des Sioux	Republican
Kidder, Jefferson Parish	01	Saint Paul	Democratic
Lee, B. G.	06	Hutchinson	Republican
McGrath, Robert B.	05	Excelsior	Republican
Mitchell, John B. H.	02	Stillwater	Republican
Moulton, Justin P.	12	Marion	Republican
Murray, William Pitt	01	Saint Paul	Democratic
Porter, John J.	17	Mankato	Democratic
Ramer, Philip	11	New Boston	Republican
Richardson, Reuben M.	03	Torah	Democratic
Sherwood, Charles D.	14	Elkhorn	Republican
Sly, J. B.	18	Belle Plaine	Democratic
Smith, Ansel	02	Franconia	Republican
Sprague, Benjamin D.	15	Lansing	Republican
Taylor, Charles	08	Northfield	Republican
Tennant, W.	19	Henderson	Democratic
Thatcher, Joseph A.	09	Zumbrota	Republican
Waite, Henry Chester	03	Saint Cloud	Republican
Wakefield, James Beach	14	Blue Earth	Republican
Walker, Asa	16	Freeborn	Republican
Walker, Hiram	09	Rushford	Republican
Wiswell, James A.	17	Garden City	Democratic
Wood, Charles	08	Morristown	Republican
Woodbury, Dwight	04	Anoka	Republican
Woodruff, Philo	16	Swavesey	Republican
Youmans, Earl S.	11	Winona	Republican

Preceded by Fourth Minnesota Legislature	Fifth Minnesota Legislature; 1863	Succeeded by Sixth Minnesota Legislature
