= William S. Moore (Minnesota politician) =

American lawyer and politician

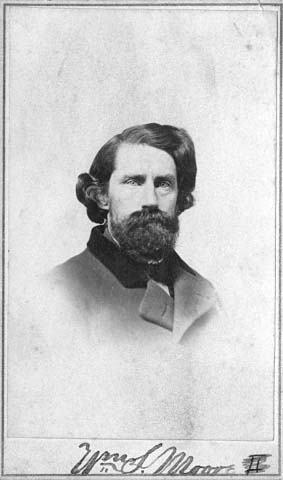
- Moore c. 1865 by Joel Emmons Whitney

Member of the Minnesota House of Representatives from the 3rd district
- In office January 2, 1866 – January 7, 1867; January 3, 1871 – January 1, 1872

Member of the Minnesota Senate from the 3rd district
- In office September 10, 1862 – January 4, 1864
- Preceded by: Sylvanus Lowry
- Succeeded by: Joseph P. Wilson

Personal details
- Born: August 17, 1830 Connecticut, U.S.
- Died: April 13, 1905 (aged 74) Saint Paul, Minnesota, U.S.
- Resting place: Oakland Cemetery, Saint Paul, Minnesota, U.S.
- Other political affiliations: Democrat
- Education: Yale University
- Occupation: Lawyer, judge, politician

William S. Moore (August 17, 1830 – April 13, 1905), also known as W.S. Moore, was an American lawyer, politician, and early citizen of St. Cloud, Minnesota who served four nonconsecutive terms in the Minnesota Legislature.

== Early life and education ==
Moore was born on August 17, 1830, in Connecticut. Moore was educated at Yale University where he was a classmate of Cyrus Northrop, the second president of the University of Minnesota. After graduating from Yale, Moore studied law. Moore moved to Minnesota Territory in 1858 and settled in St. Cloud, Minnesota where he worked as a lawyer.

== Political career ==
=== Minnesota Senate ===
Moore ran unsuccessfully in 1860 as a candidate for the Minnesota Senate representing Stearns County.^{:172} Moore was on the Democratic ticket during the 1860 Minnesota Senate election. Moore lost to Minnesota Republican candidate Seth Gibs, Moore won only 47.49% of the vote.

Moore was elected on September 6, 1862, to serve in the Minnesota Senate representing Minnesota's 3rd Senate district in the 4th Minnesota Legislature. Moore's election was a by-election to replace Sylvanus Lowry, who had only served a portion of his initial term. During Moore's two sessions in the Minnesota Senate he served on the banks, Indian affairs, railroads and railroad grants, and schools and school lands committees.

=== Minnesota House ===
Moore was elected on November 7, 1865, to serve in the Minnesota House of Representatives, representing the 3rd House district during the 8th Minnesota Legislature. Moore was reelected to the Minnesota House representing the same district on November 8, 1870, and served during the 13th Minnesota Legislature.

=== County offices ===
Moore also served as a county attorney for Stearns County, Minnesota from 1864 to 1865.^{:758} In 1866 Moore was appointed as the judge of Minnesota's 6th Judicial District.^{:758} From 1864 to 1868, Moore was the court commissioner for Stearns County.^{:760}

During his career in Minnesota politics Moore identified as a Democrat.

== Later life and death ==
In 1872 Moore moved to Saint Paul, Minnesota. Moore was on the council which commissioned the original Ramsey County courthouse. Moore died on April 13, 1905, in Saint Paul. Moored died as a result of sepsis from a small cut he received from his stovetop.

== Personal life ==
Moore was married to Mary A. Moore in 1860, together they had three children.
