= Antoine Grignon =

French Indigenous interpreter and fur trader

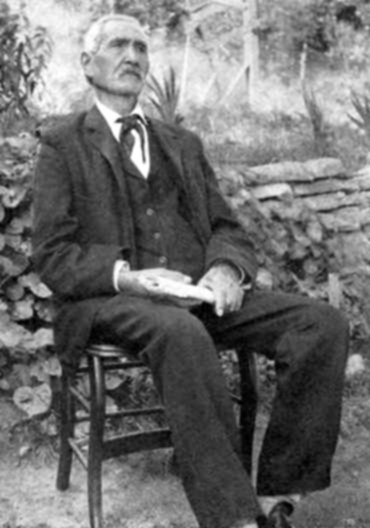
- Grignon c. 1900
- Born: January 9, 1828; Fort Crawford, Michigan Territory, U.S.
- Died: July 23, 1913 (aged 85) Trempealeau, Wisconsin, U.S.
- Allegiance: United States
- Branch: United States Army
- Conflicts: Mexican-American War

Antoine Grignon (January 9, 1828 – July 23, 1913) was an American interpreter soldier, and fur trader of French, Dakota, and Ho-Chunk ancestry. Grignon served as an interpreter for many notable fur traders and Indian agents including Nathan Myrick, Alexis Bailly, Sylvanus Lowry, Henry Halleck, and Henry M. Rice. Grignon was the son-in-law of James Allen Reed, the founder of Trempealeau County, Wisconsin.

== Early life ==
Grignon was born on January 9, 1828, at Fort Crawford in Prairie du Chien, Wisconsin to a French and Ho-Chunk father, Amable Grignon, and a French-Dakota mother, Archange La Bathe.^{129} Grignon's mother was the cousin of Wabasha III, a Dakota leader. Grignon's mother later married James Reed, the founder of Trempealeau.^{129} Grignon's father Amable served as an interpreter for Zachary Taylor at Fort Crawford which is where Grignon was educated.^{129} Because of his education at Fort Crawford and upbringing in many cultures, Grignon was fluent in English, French, Ho-Chunk, and the Dakota languages.

== North American fur trade ==
During the North American fur trade Grignon worked for the American Fur Company by initially serving as a clerk and interpreter for Alexis Bailly, a fellow "mixed blood" fur trader.^{130} While working for Bailly, Grignon primarily worked at Fort Snelling where he worked as a clerk, postal worker, and acquired hay for the cavalry stationed at the fort.^{132}

Grignon later worked for Sylvanus Lowry and Henry M. Rice and the Hudson's Bay Company at Long Prairie, Minnesota, Grignon was later involved in the removal of the Ho-Chunk people from Winona, Minnesota to the Long Prairie Indian Reservation.^{132-133} Nathan Myrick later hired Grignon in 1856 to work for him as an interpreter in Blue Earth, Minnesota.^{133} Grignon was later hired by Henry Halleck in 1881 as an official interpreter for the United States Department of the Interior for a census of the Ho-Chunk people.^{133}

Additionally, Grignon was a signatory for the "Treaty with the mixed-bloods of the Eastern Sioux" in 1849.

== Military service ==
At the outbreak of the Mexican–American War Grignon volunteered for service in the Wisconsin Volunteers in Governor Henry Dodge's home guards, the unit never left the state of Wisconsin.^{132}

== Personal life ==
Grignon was married in 1851 to Mary Christine de la Ronde, a French and Indigenous woman related to Waukon Decorah, together they had a total of 14 children, only 6 of which survived into adulthood. Grignon died on July 23, 1913, in Trempealeau.
