= Charles S. Cave =

American politician

- Cave c. 1858

Member of the Minnesota Territory House of Representatives from the 2nd District
- In office January 7, 1852 – January 4, 1843
- In office January 3, 1855 – January 1, 1856

Member of the Minnesota Senate from the 2nd District
- In office December 2, 1857 – December 6, 1859 Serving with Isaac Van Etten & William Sprigg Hall
- Succeeded by: William Sprigg Hall

Personal details
- Born: 1825 New York, U.S.
- Died: January 12, 1907 (aged 81–82)

Charles S. Cave (c. 1825 – January 12, 1907) was an American politician, postmaster, and businessman.

Cave was born around 1825 in New York. Cave moved to Minnesota Territory around 1851 and settled in Saint Paul, Minnesota. While in Saint Paul Cave was the owner and proprietor of a saloon and was an active Freemason.

Cave began his career in local politics in 1852 when he was elected to the Minnesota Territorial Legislature on October 14, 1851 representing the Minnesota Territory's 2nd House district. Cave served in the Territorial House during the 3rd Minnesota Territorial Legislature from January 7, 1852 to January 4, 1853. During his term Cave was the chairman of the Public Buildings Committee, as well as a member of the Elections and Engrossed Bills Committees.

In 1854 Cave was elected as an alderman for the Saint Paul City Council representing Saint Paul's second ward.^{:116} Cave would serve as an alderman for the city until 1857.

Cave was elected to a second term in the Minnesota Territory's House of Representatives on October 10, 1854 representing the Minnesota Territory's 2nd House district. Cave served in the 6th Minnesota Territorial Legislature from January 3, 1855 to January 1, 1856. During his second term Cave was the chairman of the Incorporations Committee, as well as a member of the Schools and Engrossed Bills Committees.

Cave was elected to the Minnesota Senate on October 13, 1857 representing Minnesota's 2nd Senate district. Cave served during the 1st Minnesota Legislature from December 2, 1857 to December 6, 1859. During his term Cave was the chairman of the Printing, Public Buildings, and the State Library Committees.

In 1860 Cave was appointed as the postmaster of Saint Paul and served as postmaster from March 11, 1856 to March 11, 1860, he was preceded by William Henry Forbes.^{:71}

Cave later moved to the state of Missouri^{:362} and settled in St. Louis where he worked as a tram operator and sutler supplying provisions to various forts on the western frontier.
