= Hiram Drache =

American historian (1924–2020)

- Born: Hiram M. Drache; August 18, 1924; Meriden Township, Steele County, Minnesota, U.S.
- Died: October 17, 2020 (aged 96)
- Education: University of Minnesota; University of North Dakota
- Occupation: Historian

Hiram M. Drache (August 18, 1924 – October 17, 2020) was an American professor of history and historian-in-residence at Concordia College, Moorhead, Minnesota. He is the author of several books on agriculture and the history of North Dakota and Minnesota.

== Biography ==
Drache was born in Meriden in August 1924. He graduated from Owatonna, Minnesota, High school in 1942. Hiram Drache was enrolled at Gustavus Adolphus College, St. Peter, Minnesota. However he enlisted in the U.S. Army Air Corps in WW2. Hiram Drache would go on to earn the rank of Major before his honorable discharge. He finished his baccalaureate degrees in 1947 and 1948. Hiram Drache went on for a master's degree from the University of Minnesota in 1952, and a doctorate from the University of North Dakota in 1962. Hiram Drache would teach and work at Concordia from 1955 until 2020. He died in October 2020 at the age of 96.

== Bibliography (excerpt) ==
- The Day of the Bonanza (1964)
- Challenge of the Prairie; Life and Times of the Red River Pioneers (1970)
- Beyond the Furrow: Some Keys to Successful Farming in the Twentieth Century (1976)
- Tomorrow's Harvest: Thoughts and Opinions of Successful Farmers (1978)
- Koochiching: Pioneering Along the Rainy River Frontier (1983)
- Polar Pilot: The Carl Ben Eielson Story (with Dorothy G. Page; 1992)
- Taming the Wilderness: The Northern Border Country, 1910-1939 (1992)
- History Of U. S. Agriculture And Its Relevance To Today (1996)
- Legacy of the Land: Agriculture's Story to the Present (1996)
- Century in the Park: Oak Grove Lutheran School (2006)
- Beyond the Furrow: Some Keys to Successful Farming in the Twentieth Century (1976)
- Plowshares To Printouts: Farm Management As Viewed Through 75 Years Of The Northwest Farm Managers Association
