= Grant Hauschild =

American politician (elected Nov 2022)

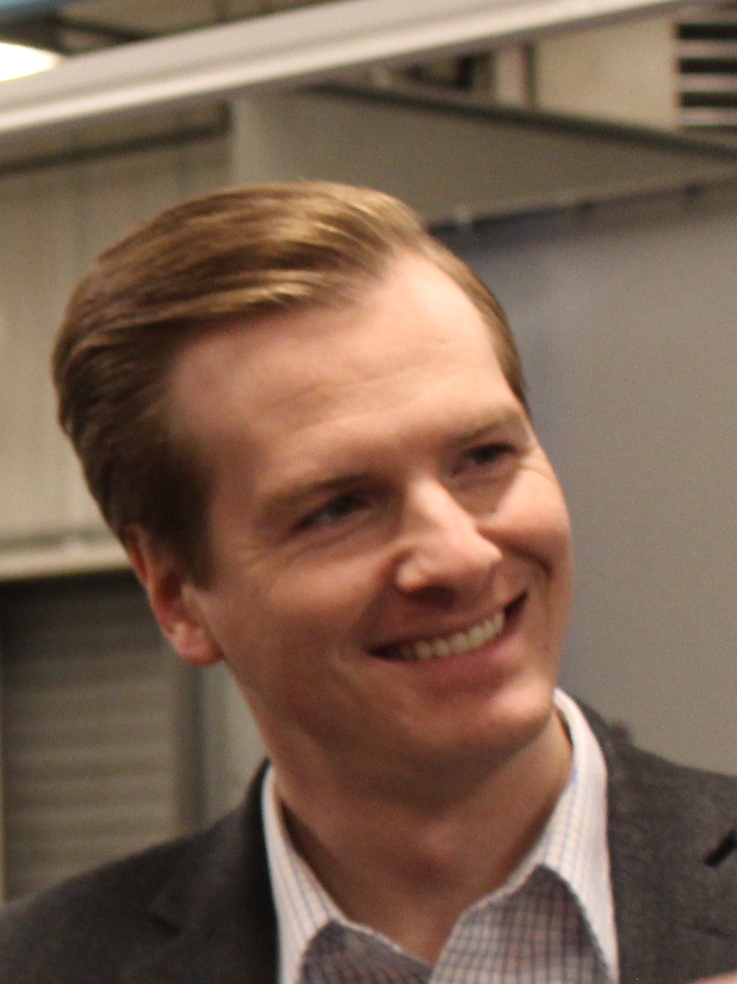

Member of the Minnesota Senate from the 3rd district
- Incumbent
- Assumed office January 3, 2023
- Preceded by: Thomas Bakk

Personal details
- Born: March 1989 (age 37) Fargo, North Dakota, U.S.
- Party: Democratic (DFL)
- Spouse: Grace
- Children: 2
- Education: University of North Dakota (BA); George Washington University (MPP)

Grant Hauschild (/ˈhɑːstʃaɪld/ HAHSS-chyld) (born March 1989 in Fargo, North Dakota) is an American politician representing District 3 in the Minnesota Senate since 2023.

== Education ==
Hauschild earned a Bachelor of Arts degree in political science and public administration from the University of North Dakota and a master's in public policy analysis from George Washington University.

== Personal life ==
Hauschild and his wife, Grace, have two children. Hauschild is a hunter.

== Career ==
Hauschild worked for Barack Obama's 2012 presidential campaign. From 2011 to 2014, he served in the United States Department of Agriculture as an economic development specialist and confidential assistant. In 2014 and 2015, he served in the office of U.S. Senator Heidi Heitkamp. Hauschild was an unsuccessful candidate for the North Dakota House in 2016. He returned to the University of North Dakota in 2015, working as associate director of development until 2017 and director of development from 2017 to 2018. Hauschild moved to Minnesota in 2019 to work for the Essentia Health Foundation. He also served as a member of the Hermantown, Minnesota, city council.

== Minnesota Senate ==
Hauschild was elected to the Minnesota Senate in 2022. He serves on the following committees:

- Labor (vice chair)
- Taxes (vice chair)
- Education Policy
- Environment, Climate, and Legacy

== Electoral history ==
2022 Minnesota Senate District 3 election
Party	Candidate	Votes	%
Democratic–Farmer–Labor Party	Grant Hauschild	22,052	50.77
Republican	Andrea Zupancich	21,349	49.15
Write-in		38	0.09
Total		43,439	100

2020 Hermantown City Council election (Elect 2)
Party	Candidate	Votes	%
Nonpartisan	John Geissler	3,739	53.71
Nonpartisan	Grant Hauschild	3,145	45.18
Write-in		77	1.11
Total		6,961	100
