= Abraham Bisson House =

- U.S. National Register of Historic Places
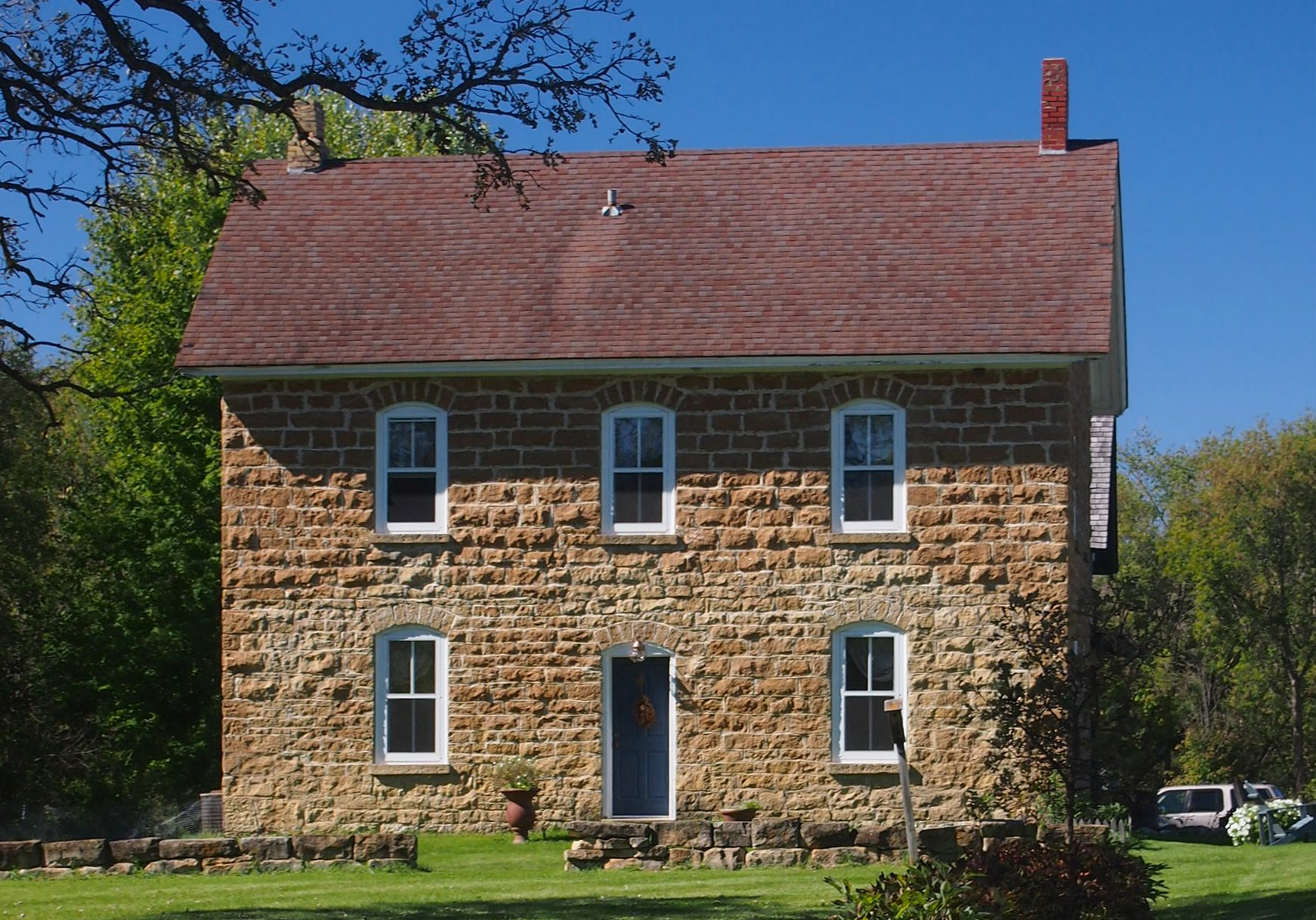
- The Abraham Bisson House from the east

- Location within Minnesota Location within the United States
- Location: 20150 County Road 57, St. Lawrence Township, Minnesota
- Coordinates: 44°39′27.5″N 93°42′29.5″W
- Area: 4 acres (1.6 ha)
- Built: 1884
- MPS: Scott County MRA
- NRHP reference No.: 80002164
- Added to NRHP: April 17, 1980

The Abraham Bisson House is a historic house in St. Lawrence Township, Minnesota, United States. It was built in 1884 with sandstone from the owner's adjacent quarry. The house was listed on the National Register of Historic Places in 1980 for its significance in the theme of architecture. It was nominated for its distinctive sandstone masonry and for being one of the few surviving remnants of the now-vanished town of St. Lawrence, Minnesota.

== Description ==
The Abraham Bisson House stands on a four-acre (1.6 ha) privately owned lot surrounded by the Minnesota Valley State Recreation Area. It has a simple rectangular footprint and rises two stories, with a gable roof. The house is built of irregularly-sized sandstone ashlars, including a cornerstone with the construction date of 1884. The stone courses are arched slightly over the doors and windows. A brick chimney emerges from the roofline at either gable end.

== History ==
Abraham Bisson settled this property in 1857, a mile from the town of St. Lawrence, which had been platted the year prior. Scott County was experiencing its initial population boom, and Bisson quarried sandstone on site that was used for buildings in St. Lawrence, Jordan, and surrounding farmsteads. In 1884 Bisson opted to replace his existing home with this new structure.

As railroads replaced steamboat traffic, St. Lawrence and other towns on the Minnesota River withered away. By the late 20th century all buildings within St. Lawrence had been demolished. The Abraham Bisson House is one of the few surviving buildings associated with the community.

== See also ==
- National Register of Historic Places listings in Scott County, Minnesota
