= Reuben M. Richardson =

American politician

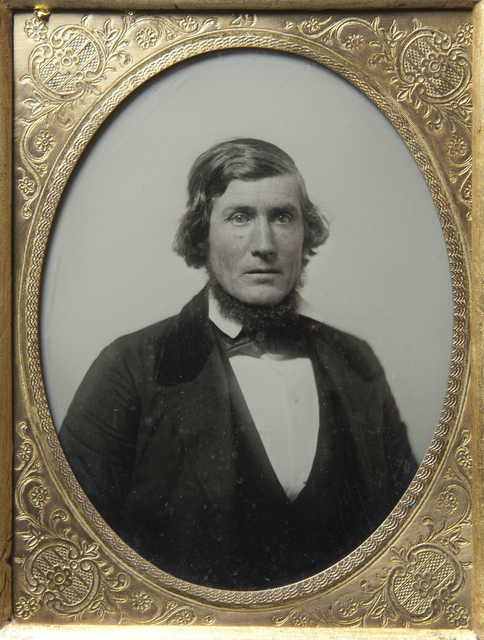
- Richardson c. 1858

Postmaster of St. Cloud, Minnesota
- In office August 21, 1866 – April 5, 1869
- Preceded by: Henry Z. Mitchell
- Succeeded by: Josiah E. West

Member of the Minnesota Senate from the 3rd District and 20th District
- In office December 2, 1857 – December 6, 1859; January 2, 1866 – January 7, 1867

Member of the Minnesota House of Representatives from the 3rd District and 5th District
- In office January 4, 1854 – January 2, 1855; January 7, 1862 – January 2, 1865

Personal details
- Born: August 8, 1816 Pickaway County, Ohio, U.S.
- Died: March 16, 1898 (aged 81) Morris, Minnesota, U.S.
- Other political affiliations: Democrat

Reuben M. Richardson (August 8, 1816 – March 16, 1898) was an American politician, surveyor, farmer, and early citizen of Sauk Rapids, Minnesota. Richardson platted the city of Richmond, Minnesota in 1856. Between 1854 and 1866, Richardson served a total of six terms in the Minnesota Legislature.

== Early life and career ==
Richardson was born on August 8, 1816, in Pickaway County, Ohio, he was the son of Peter Richardson and Ann Richardson (née Mowbray).^{:385} In 1839 Richardson moved to Wisconsin Territory where he worked in the lead mining industry.^{:385}

In 1849 Richardson moved to Minnesota Territory and settled in Saint Paul where he worked for Henry M. Rice and was in charge of transporting military goods from Fort Snelling to Fort Gaines (later named Fort Ripley) and Pembina.^{:385} In the spring of 1850 Richardson was appointed as the deputy sheriff and Deputy US Marshal of Benton County, Minnesota.^{:385}

Richardson would later move to Sauk Rapids in 1851 where he worked as a farmer.^{:385} On October 8, 1852, Richardson was appointed as the tax receiver for the city of Sauk Rapids.^{:767} In 1855 Richardson and his family moved to Richmond, Minnesota near the Sauk River where they made a land claim.^{:1282} Richardson would survey and plat the city of Richmond a year later in 1856.^{:385}^{:1282}

== Political career ==
=== Minnesota House ===
Richardson served four total terms in the Minnesota House of Representatives between 1854 and 1865. Richardson was first elected to serve in the Minnesota Territorial Legislature on October 12, 1853, representing the 5th District of the Minnesota Territorial House of Representatives. The district at the time consisted of Benton County and Cass County, Minnesota. Richardson would serve during the 5th Minnesota Territorial Legislature from January 4, 1854, to January 2, 1855. During his term Richardson was the chairman of Territorial Expenditures and was a member of the Enrolled Bills and Public Buildings committees.

Richardson was later elected on October 6, 1861, to serve in the Minnesota House as a representative of Minnesota's 3rd House district. At the time the 3rd House district consisted of all counties north of the Rum River and east of the Mississippi River^{:385} These counties included Aitkin, Becker, Buchanan (defunct), Carlton, Cass, Crow Wing, Douglas, Itasca, Lake, Morrison, Otter Tail, Pembina (defunct), Polk, St. Louis, Stearns, Todd, Toombs (defunct), and Wadena. Richardson would serve from January 7, 1862, to January 2, 1865, during the 4th Minnesota Legislature, 5th Minnesota Legislature, and 6th Minnesota Legislature.

=== Minnesota Senate ===
Richardson served a total of two terms in the Minnesota Senate between 1857 and 1867. Richardson was first elected to the Minnesota Senate on October 13, 1857, as a senator from Minnesota's 20th Senate district. At the time the district included Benton County, Stearns County, and Meeker County.

Richardson was elected on November 7, 1865, to serve as a senator in Minnesota's 3rd Senate district. Richardson would serve from January 2, 1866, to January 7, 1867, during the 8th Minnesota Legislature. During his term Richardson was a member of the and Banks, Indian Affairs, Internal Improvements, Public Lands, and Railroad committees.

=== Later offices ===
Richardson was appointed as the postmaster of St. Cloud, Minnesota on August 21, 1866, he would serve as postmaster until April 5, 1869.^{:1428}

== Later life and death ==
Richardson moved to Morris, Minnesota on May 20, 1869, where he lived for the remainder of his life.^{:385} While in Morris, Richardson worked as the judge of probate for the Stevens County probate court.

Richardson died on March 16, 1898, in Morris.^{:1195}
