= James Reed (fur trader) =

American fur trader

James Allen Reed (c. 1798 – June, 1873) was an American fur trader, businessman, veteran, and frontiersman who founded the cities of Trempealeau, Wisconsin and Winona, Minnesota.

== Biography ==
Reed was born in 1798 in Kentucky to a Scotch-Irish family.^{136}^{107} Reed fought in the War of 1812 before enlisting in the regular army and being sent to Fort Crawford in modern-day Prairie du Chien, Wisconsin.^{136} While at Fort Crawford Reed worked as an interpreter, military scout, fur trader, and carpenter.^{136-137} Reed later served as a guide for the United States Army in campaigns against various Indigenous people in Wisconsin.^{136} While in Prairie du Chien Reed met a Potawatomi woman whom he married and had a total of five children with, she eventually died in 1830.^{136-137}

Following his discharge from the military Reed began working for the American Fur Company out of Red Cedar, Wisconsin, then part of Wisconsin Territory, where he established a trading post and exchanged furs for goods with the Meskwaki, the Sauk people, the Dakota people, and the Ho-Chunk.^{137}^{107} During the Black Hawk War Reed assisted the United States Government in the Battle of Bad Axe as a dispatch rider.^{137} Following the Black Hawk War Reed continued to work for the U.S. government as a trader for the government and later owned a tavern and inn.^{111} Reed eventually abandoned his business prospects in 1838 and continued to work for the American Fur Company.^{111}

Beginning in the summer 1840 Reed and his son-in-law, James Douville, settled what would become the city of Trempealeau, Wisconsin, Reed's log cabin settlement in Trempealeau along the Mississippi River was originally referred to as "Reed's Place", "Reed's Landing", or "Reed's Town" by early settlers of the region.^{73}^{111} Trempealeau would not be formally incorporated until 1851 when it came under the jurisdiction of La Crosse County, Wisconsin.

Reed married his second wife while in Trempealeau, a French and Ho-Chunk woman named Archange La Bathe-Grignon, the mother of the translator and fur trader Antoine Grignon. La Bathe was the widow of Amable Grignon, another fur trader from Prairie du Chien. She was also the cousin of Chief Wabasha III of Winona.^{129} Reed was later appointed as a government farmer in order to establish a government store across the Mississippi River in what is now southern Minnesota and to assist Wabasha's band of the Dakota in farming.^{139}^{53}

Reed first settled what is now modern day Winona, Minnesota in October 1842.^{139} With the help of Lafayette Bunnell, Reed was able to erect Winona's first storefront and trading post which Reed operated.^{139} In April, 1851 Reed was elected as Trempealeau's first justice of the peace.^{139}

After the death of his third wife Reed lived in the nearby settlement of Little Tamarack, Reed died in June 1873 in Trempealeau.^{142}

== Legacy ==
Reed is remembered today as the founder of both Trempealeau and Winona, a memorial of Reed was dedicated in Trempealeau in 2019 honoring Reed as Trempealeau and Winona's "founding father".
