= 1863 Minnesota lieutenant gubernatorial election =

- November 3, 1863
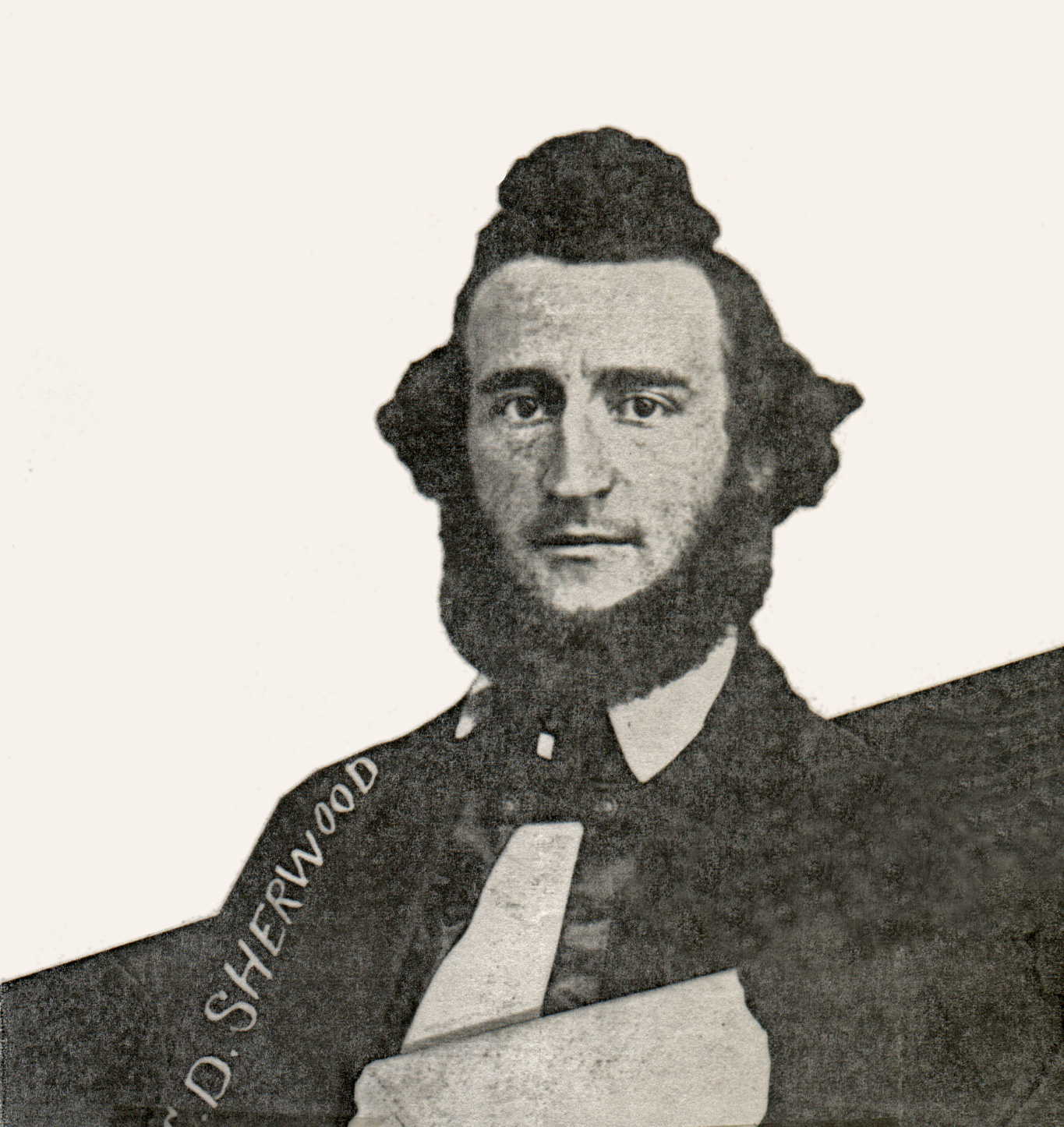

Nominee	Charles D. Sherwood	James S. Norris
Party	Republican	Democratic
Popular vote	19,601	12,694
Percentage	60.69%	39.31%
Lieutenant Governor before election
Vacant
Elected Lieutenant Governor
Charles D. Sherwood
Republican

The 1863 Minnesota lieutenant gubernatorial election was held on November 3, 1863, in order to elect the lieutenant governor of Minnesota. Republican nominee and former Speaker of the Minnesota House of Representatives Charles D. Sherwood defeated Democratic nominee and former Territorial Speaker of the Minnesota House of Representatives James S. Norris by a margin of 6,907. Republican control over the office of lieutenant governor was retained. Sherwood was sworn in as the 4th lieutenant governor of Minnesota on January 11, 1864.

Charles Sherwood and R. Ottman were both candidates for the Republican nomination.

== Candidates ==
- Charles D. Sherwood, member of the Minnesota House of Representatives (Republican)
- James S. Norris, former member of the Minnesota Territorial Legislature (Democratic)

== Results ==
Minnesota lieutenant gubernatorial election, 1863
Party	Candidate	Votes	%
Republican	Charles D. Sherwood	19,601	60.69
Democratic	James S. Norris	12,694	39.31
Total votes		32,295	100.00
Republican hold			
