= Meriden, Minnesota =

Meriden
- Unincorporated community
- Location within Minnesota Location within the United States
- Coordinates: 44°04′27″N 93°23′13″W
- Country: United States
- State: Minnesota
- County: Steele
- Township: Meriden Township
- Elevation: 1,135 ft (346 m)
- Time zone: UTC-6 (Central (CST))
  - Summer (DST): UTC-5 (CDT)
- ZIP code: 55060 and 56093
- Area code: 507
- GNIS feature ID: 647776

Meriden (/ˈmɛərɪdən/ MAIR-id-ən) is an unincorporated community in Meriden Township, Steele County, Minnesota, United States, near Owatonna and Waseca. The community is located along SW 92nd Avenue (County 18) near SW 13th Street.

== History ==
Meriden was laid out in 1867. The community was named after Meriden, Connecticut, the native home of a first settler. The Meriden post office was discontinued in 1992.
