= Gilfillan, Minnesota =

Gilfillan
- Unincorporated community
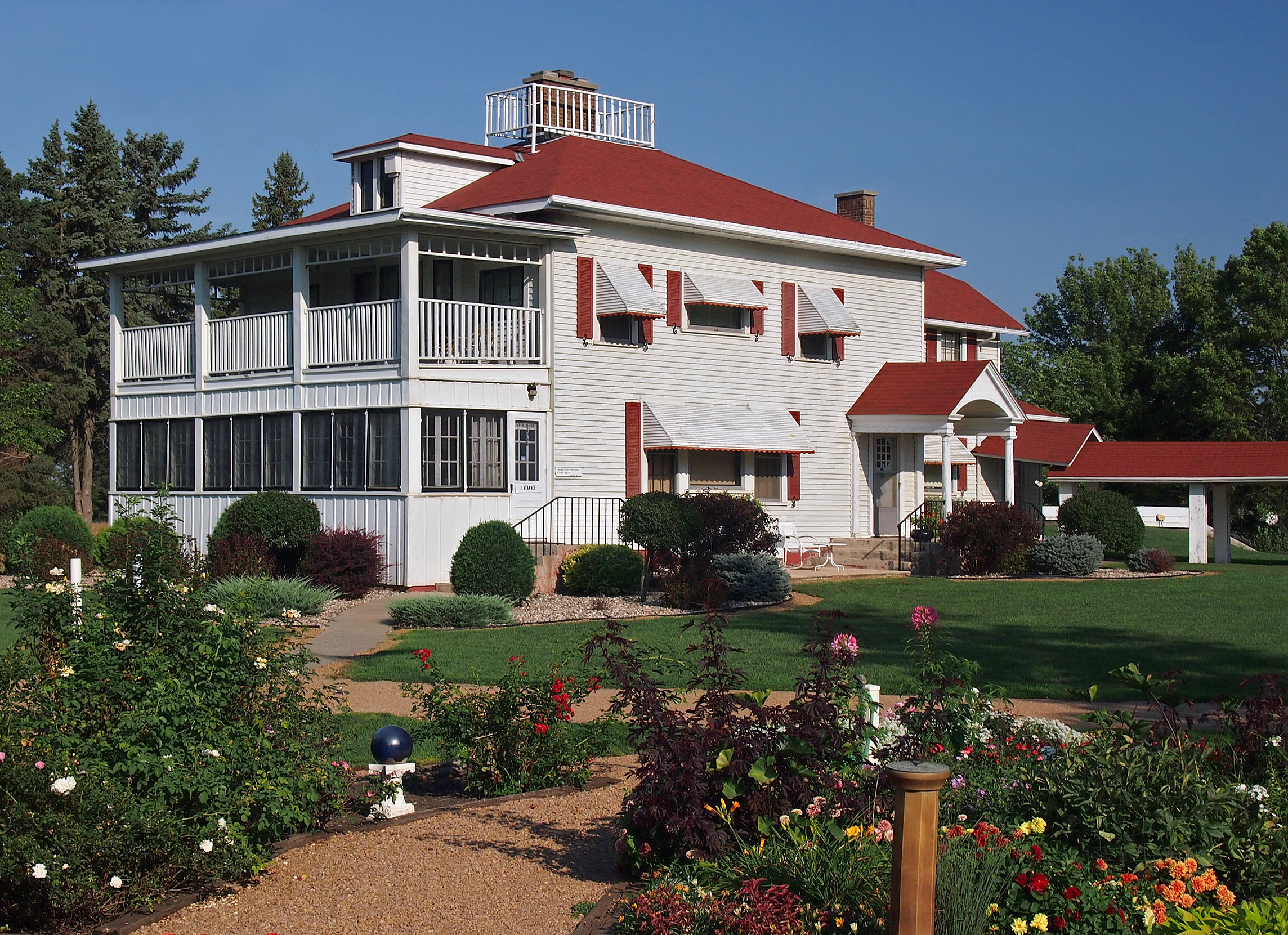
- The Gilfillan Estate

- Location within the state of Minnesota
- Coordinates: 44°27′33″N 94°59′40″W
- Country: United States
- State: Minnesota
- County: Redwood
- Elevation: 1,040 ft (320 m)
- Time zone: UTC-6 (Central (CST))
  - Summer (DST): UTC-5 (CDT)
- GNIS feature ID: 654721

Gilfillan is an unincorporated community in Redwood County, in the U.S. state of Minnesota.

== History ==
Gilfillan was named for Charles Duncan Gilfillan, a local landowner, and afterward state legislator.
