= Thomas H. Everts =

American politician, physician, and newspaper editor (1835–1925)

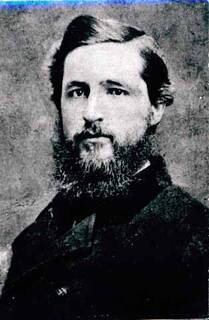
- Everts in 1872

Member of the Minnesota Senate from the 2nd district
- In office January 2, 1872 – January 5, 1874
- Preceded by: Dwight M. Sabin
- Succeeded by: Charles Henry Conkey

Personal details
- Born: Thomas Hayworth Everts; 1835 Union Mills, Indiana, U.S.
- Died: May 12, 1925 (aged 89–90) Lake Forest, Illinois, U.S.
- Party: Republican
- Spouse: Caroline G. Sleight (m. 1855)
- Occupation: Physician

Thomas Hayworth Everts (1835 – May 12, 1925) was an American physician, politician, and newspaper editor who served in the Minnesota Senate from 1872 to 1874 as a senator for the 2nd district, which at the time consisted of Fillmore County.

== Early life ==
Thomas Hayworth Everts was born in Union Mills, Indiana, in 1835. He studied medicine at the University of Michigan and the University of Iowa. He came to Minnesota and settled in Rushford in 1856.

== Career ==
He relocated from Rushford sometime after and lived a "roving life" as described by his biographical sketch in the state legislative manual. He returned to Rushford in 1866 and practiced as a physician there.

In November 1871, Everts was elected to the Minnesota Senate as a senator for the 2nd district. He was a member of the Republican Party. He served the second part of his term as well.

He served as a newspaper editor for the Boulder County News and Courier in Boulder, Colorado, from 1878 to 1883.

== Death ==
Everts died at the home of his daughter in Lake Forest, Illinois, on May 12, 1925. He was 90 years old. He was buried in Valparaiso, Indiana.

== Personal life ==
Everts married Caroline G. Sleight on October 18, 1855, in Michigan City, Indiana.

Preceded by Dwight M. Sabin	Member of the Minnesota Senate from the 2nd district January 2, 1872 – January 5, 1874	Succeeded by Charles Henry Conkey
