= Steve Green (politician) =

American politician

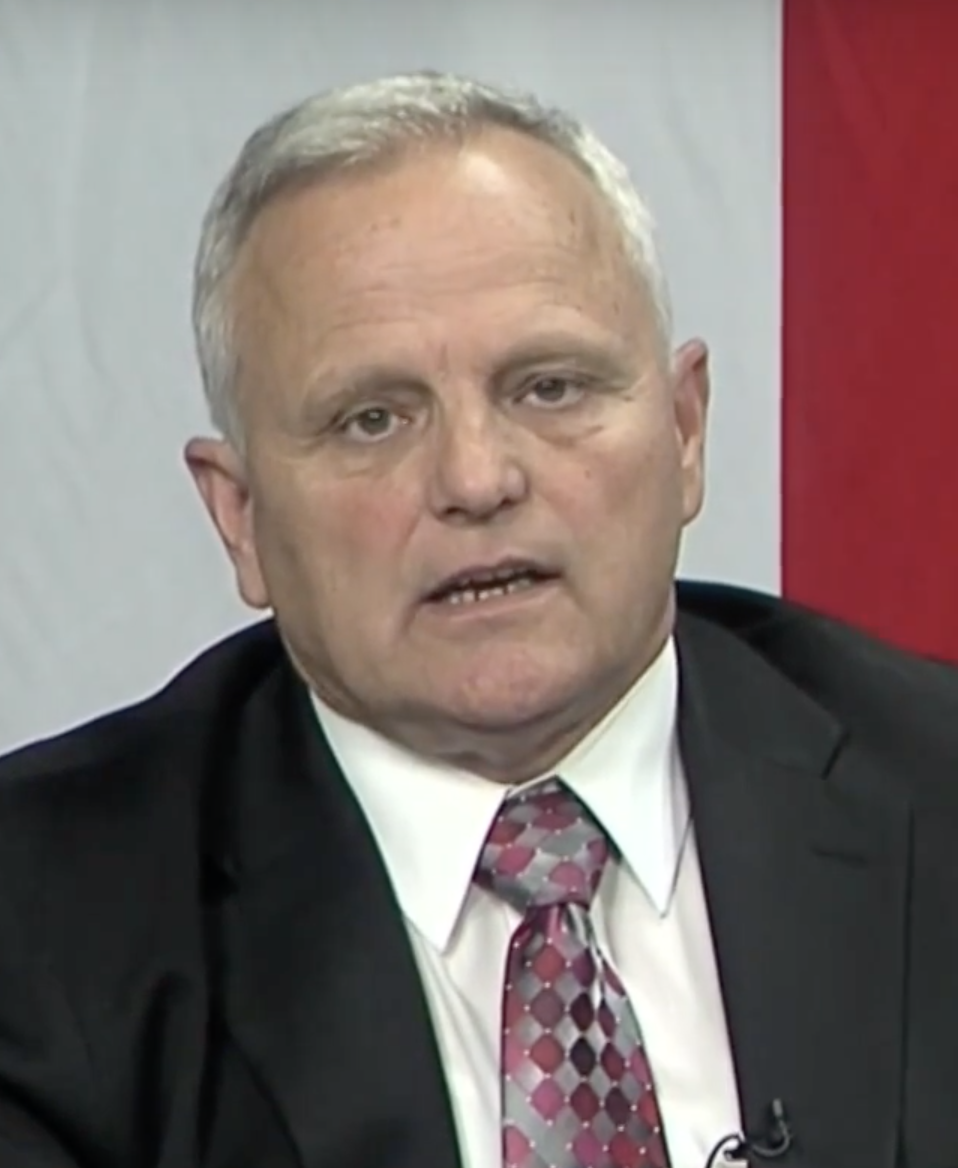

Member of the Minnesota Senate from the 2nd district
- Incumbent
- Assumed office January 3, 2023
- Preceded by: Paul Utke

Member of the Minnesota House of Representatives from the 2B district
- In office January 8, 2013 – January 3, 2023
- Preceded by: Dave Hancock
- Succeeded by: Matt Bliss

Personal details
- Born: May 28, 1960 (age 66)
- Party: Republican Party of Minnesota
- Spouse: Cindy
- Children: 6
- Education: Detroit Lakes Area Vocational Technical Institute
- Occupation: legislator

Steve Green (born May 28, 1960) is an American politician and member of the Minnesota Senate. A member of the Republican Party of Minnesota, he represents District 2. He previously served in the Minnesota House of Representatives, representing District 2B in northwestern Minnesota, which includes most of Becker County, southern Clearwater County, southern Hubbard County, Mahnomen County, northeastern Otter Tail County and northern Wadena County.

== Education and career ==
Green graduated from Fosston High School in 1978. He later attended the Detroit Lakes Area Vocational Technical Institute. Green operated Lakeland Greenhouse, which his parents established in 1973, from 1981 to 2004. He now makes his living in construction and carpentry work.

Green had been politically active in the Republican Party for many years before running for office.

== Minnesota House of Representatives ==
Green lost his first bids for the Minnesota House in 2008 and 2010. He was elected in 2012.

=== Committee assignments ===
For the 89th legislative session, Green was a member of:

- Greater Minnesota Economic and Workforce Development Policy Committee (vice chair)
- Environment and Natural Resources Policy and Finance Committee
- Legacy Funding Finance Committee

For the 88th legislative session, Green was a member of:

- Capital Investment Committee
- Environment and Natural Resources Policy Committee
- Housing Finance and Policy Committee
- Legacy Committee

== Minnesota Senate ==
Green was elected to the Minnesota Senate in 2022.

== Personal life ==
Green and his wife, Cindy, have six children and reside in Fosston, Minnesota. He is self-employed.

== Elections ==
2022 Minnesota Senate District 2 election
Party	Candidate	Votes	%
Republican	Steve Green	20,397	59.96
Democratic (DFL)	Alan Roy	13,589	39.95
Write-in		31	0.09
Total votes		34,017	100%

2014 Minnesota State Representative- House 2B
Party	Candidate	Votes	%	±%
Democratic (DFL)	David Sobieski	6236	42.77	
Republican	Steve Green (Incumbent)	8335	57.16	+6.2

2012 Minnesota State Representative- House 2B
Party	Candidate	Votes	%	±%
Democratic (DFL)	Brita Sailer	9376	48.96	
Republican	Steve Green	9759	50.96	+6.96

2010 Minnesota State Representative- House 2A
Party	Candidate	Votes	%	±%
Democratic (DFL)	Kent Eken (Incumbent)	7502	55.86	
Republican	Steve Green	5915	44.0	+7.61

2008 Minnesota State Representative- House 2A
Party	Candidate	Votes	%	±%
Democratic (DFL)	Kent Eken (Incumbent)	11411	63.54	
Republican	Steve Green	6535	36.39	
