= Joseph P. Wilson =

American politician

- Wilson c. 1897

Member of the Minnesota Senate from the 3rd District
- In office January 5, 1864 – January 1, 1866
- Preceded by: William S. Moore
- Succeeded by: Louis A. Evans

County Commissioner of Ramsey County, Minnesota
- In office 1854–1856
- Preceded by: Roswell P. Russell
- Succeeded by: Edmund Rice

Personal details
- Born: March 16, 1823 Columbia Falls, Maine, U.S.
- Died: February 18, 1900 (aged 76) St. Cloud, Minnesota, U.S
- Other political affiliations: Democrat

Military service
- Allegiance: United States of America
- Branch/service: United States Army
- Years of service: 1848–1848
- Unit: Company I, 2nd Regiment of Illinois Volunteers
- Battles/wars: Mexican–American War

Joseph P. Wilson (March 16, 1823 – February 18, 1900), also known as J.P. Wilson, was an American politician, businessman, and early citizen of St. Cloud, Minnesota. Wilson served two consecutive terms in the Minnesota Senate.

== Early life and career ==
Wilson was born on March 16, 1823, in Columbia Falls, Maine. In 1833, Wilson's family moved to New York City. While in New York, Wilson worked for the Mayor of New York City, William V. Brady, in the banking and exchange office. Wilson later worked for the printing office of Horace Greeley for two years before entering the law office of Silas M. Stilwell. Wilson moved Geneva, Illinois in the 1840s and worked in the law office of B.F. Fridley. In 1846 Wilson was admitted to the bar, however, he did not practice law. In 1847 Wilson speculated land in north Illinois before enlisting in the Army and serving in the Mexican–American War. During the conflict Wilson served in Company I of the 2nd Regiment of Illinois Volunteers. During his time in the army Wilson met John H. Stevens who was also a notable early citizen of Minnesota.

Following his military service, Wilson worked as a merchant in Oswego, Illinois. and traveled to Galena, Illinois, Prairie du Chien, Wisconsin, and Stillwater, Minnesota, before permanently moving to Minnesota Territory and settling in St. Anthony, Minnesota on April 18, 1850. While in Minnesota Wilson worked as a merchant before focusing on a career real estate.

== Political career ==
Wilson began his political career serving as a county commissioner for Ramsey County, Minnesota from 1854 to 1856, he was succeeded by Edmund Rice. Wilson was elected as a member of the 7th Council District for Minnesota Territory's Democratic Constitutional Convention in 1857. The convention helped ratify the Minnesota Constitution. Wilson was elected to the Minnesota Senate on November 3, 1863, to represent the 3rd Senate district in the 6th Minnesota Legislature. During his first term Wilson was a member of the banks, emigration, engrossment, railroads, and state library committees. Wilson served as second term during the 7th Minnesota Legislature. During his second term Wilson was a member of the banks, emigration, railroads, state library, and state prison committees. Throughout his political career Wilson identified as a member of the Minnesota Democratic Party in an overwhelmingly Republican state.

== Later life and death ==
In 1855 Wilson was one of the early settlers of St. Cloud, Minnesota, St. Cloud was founded by Joseph's brother John Lyman Wilson, who had previously served in the Minnesota Territorial Legislature. In 1882 Wilson platted East St. Cloud, an extension of the city of St. Cloud, which is now a ghost town. Wilson died on February 18, 1900, in St. Cloud.
