= Lawrence, Minnesota =

Ghost town in St. Lawrence Township, Minnesota, US

Coordinates: 44°39′29″N 93°41′05″W

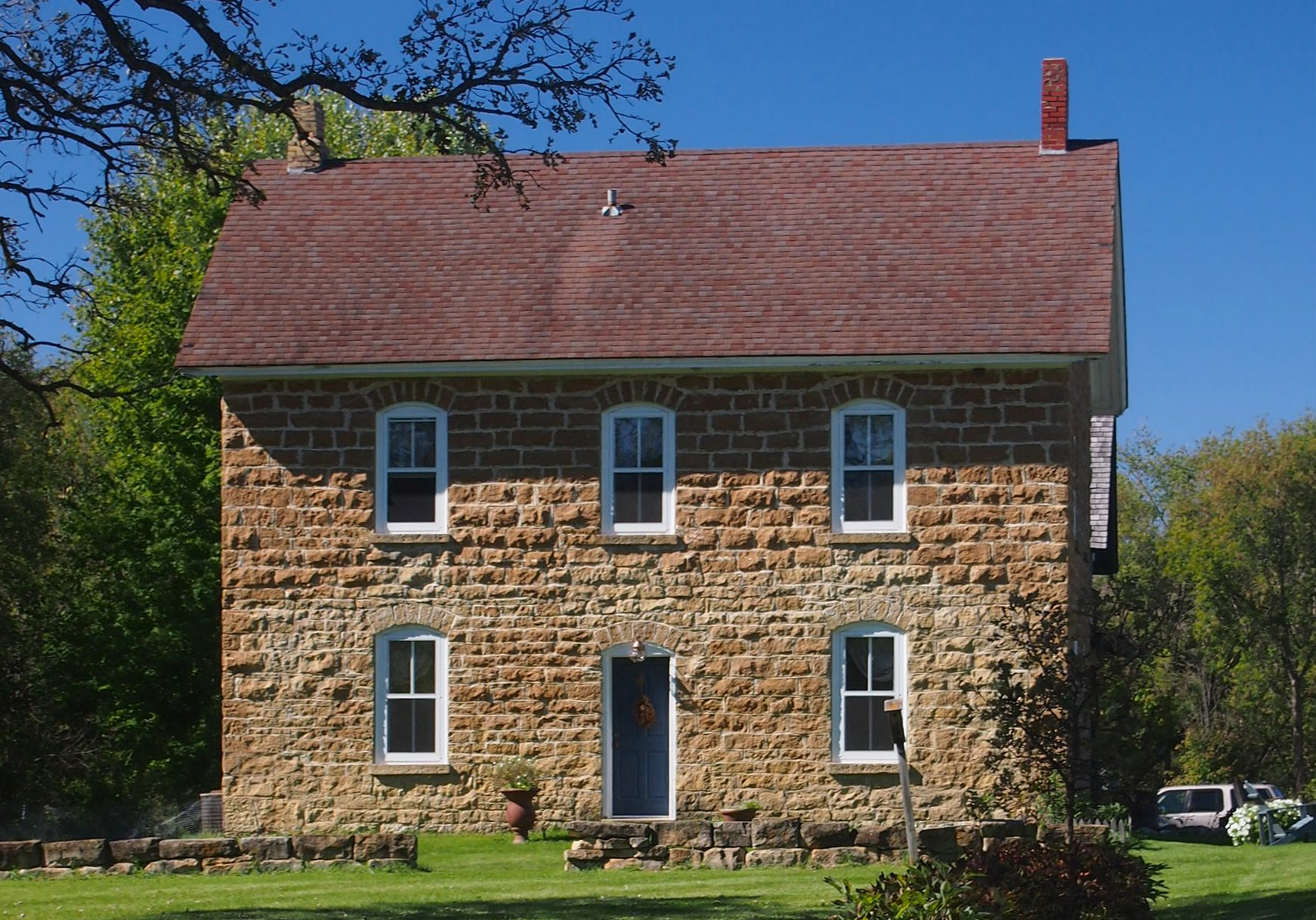
The 1884 Abraham Bisson House is a vestige of Lawrence, Minnesota

Lawrence is an abandoned village in section 16 of St. Lawrence Township, Scott County, in the U.S. state of Minnesota. The GNIS classifies it as a populated place.

== History ==
Lawrence village was originally called St. Lawrence. Both names honor John Lawrence, a pioneer settler. A post office operated under the name St. Lawrence from 1857 until 1879.
