= Charles D. Sherwood =

American politician (1833–1895)

Charles Daniel Sherwood
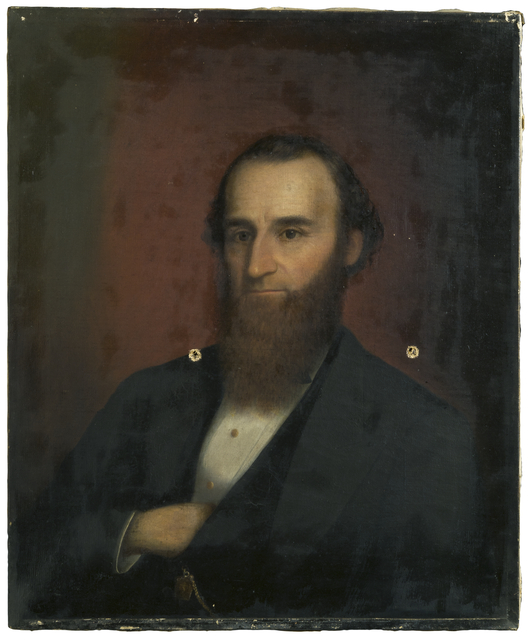
- Portrait of Sherwood c. 1870

4th Lieutenant Governor of Minnesota
- In office January 11, 1864 – January 8, 1866
- Governor: Stephen Miller
- Preceded by: Henry Adoniram Swift
- Succeeded by: Thomas H. Armstrong

5th Speaker of the Minnesota House of Representatives
- In office 1863–1863
- Preceded by: Jared Benson
- Succeeded by: Jared Benson

Minnesota State Representative from the 9th District
- In office December 7, 1859 – January 7, 1861

Minnesota State Representative from the 14th District
- In office January 8, 1861 – January 6, 1862
- In office January 6, 1863 – January 4, 1864

Personal details
- Born: November 18, 1833 New Milford, Connecticut, U.S.
- Died: July 3, 1895 (aged 61) Chicago, Illinois, U.S.
- Party: Republican

Charles Daniel Sherwood (November 18, 1833 – July 3, 1895) was a Minnesota politician who served three nonconsecutive terms in the Minnesota House of Representatives, was the fourth Lieutenant Governor of Minnesota, and served as the fifth Speaker of the Minnesota House.

== Early life ==
Sherwood was born on November 18, 1833, in New Milford, Connecticut. Sherwood moved to Minnesota Territory in 1855 and settled in the village of Elkhorn in Fillmore County where he worked as a farmer. Sherwood was involved in the organization of Sumner Township in Fillmore County on May 11, 1858, and was elected as the township's chairman of supervisors.^{:381} Sherwood later worked as the proprietor of the Rushford Gazette newspaper in Rushford, Minnesota.^{:437}

== Political career ==
Sherwood was first elected to the Minnesota House of Representatives on October 11, 1859, where he would serve two terms. Sherwood would run for a nonconsecutive third term in 1862. Upon the start of the 5th Minnesota Legislature, Sherwood was elected as the second youngest Speaker of the Minnesota House of Representatives in state history. He assumed the office at the age of only 29, beaten only by George Bradley. He would only serve one term as speaker, running for lieutenant governor. Sherwood would be elected as the fourth lieutenant governor of Minnesota, serving from January 11, 1864, to January 8, 1866, under governor Stephen Miller.

== Later life ==
Following his political career Sherwood worked in Hokah, Minnesota where he assisted in organizing the Southern Minnesota railway. Sherwood later served as the superintendent of the Southern Minnesota Railway Company. In 1878, Sherwood settled in Franklin County, Tennessee and platted the community of Sherwood, Tennessee that was named for him. Sherwood traveled to Chicago, Illinois in March of 1895 in order to have surgery. During this time, Sherwood was supposedly suffering from depression. Sherwood died on July 3, 1895 while in Chicago. A coroner's jury ruled Sherwood's death as suicide by drowning. Sherwood is buried in Kankakee, Illinois.

Political offices
Preceded by Henry Adoniram Swift	Lieutenant Governor of Minnesota; 1864–1866	Succeeded by Thomas H. Armstrong
Preceded by Jared Benson	Speaker of the Minnesota House of Representatives; 1863	Succeeded by Jared Benson
