= Jared Benson =

American politician (1821–1894)

4th Speaker of the Minnesota House of Representatives
- In office 1861–1862
- Preceded by: Amos Coggswell
- Succeeded by: Charles D. Sherwood

6th Speaker of the Minnesota House of Representatives
- In office 1864–1864
- Preceded by: Charles D. Sherwood
- Succeeded by: Thomas H. Armstrong

Minnesota State Representative from the 4th District
- In office January 8, 1861 – January 5, 1863
- In office January 5, 1864 – January 2, 1865

Minnesota State Representative from the 25th District
- In office January 7, 1879 – January 3, 1881

Minnesota State Representative from the 28th District
- In office January 8, 1889 – January 5, 1891

Personal details
- Born: 1821 Worcester, Massachusetts, U.S.
- Died: May 9, 1894 (aged 72–73)
- Party: Republican
- Profession: Farmer

Jared Benson (1821 in Worcester, Massachusetts – May 9, 1894) was a Minnesota politician and a former Speaker of the Minnesota House of Representatives. Benson served two stints as speaker, from 1861 to 1862, and again in 1864. He also served as a regent of the University of Minnesota.

Political offices
Preceded by Amos Coggswell	Speaker of the Minnesota House of Representatives; 1861–1862	Succeeded by Charles D. Sherwood
Preceded by Charles D. Sherwood	Speaker of the Minnesota House of Representatives; 1864	Succeeded by Thomas H. Armstrong
