= Charles Duncan Gilfillan =

American politician

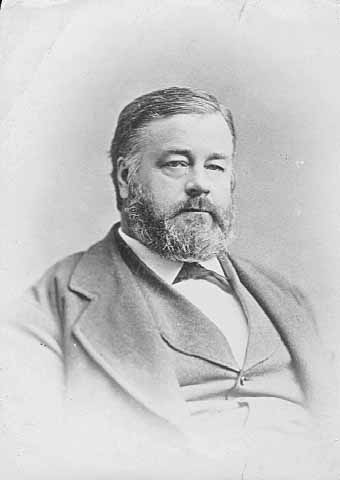
- Gilfillan in about 1890

Member of the Minnesota House of Representatives from the 1st district
- In office January 3, 1865 – January 1, 1866
- Preceded by: Rudolph H. Fitz
- Succeeded by: [data missing]

Member of the Minnesota House of Representatives from the 24th district
- In office January 4, 1876 – January 1, 1877
- Preceded by: [data missing]
- Succeeded by: [data missing]

Personal details
- Born: July 4, 1831
- Died: December 19, 1902 (aged 71)

Charles Duncan Gilfillan (July 4, 1831 – December 19, 1902) was an American politician and businessman.

== Life ==
Gilfillan was born in New Hartford, New York and went to the Homer Academy. He studied at the Hamilton College in 1849 and 1850. Gilfillan moved to Saint Paul, Minnesota Territory in 1851. He studied law and was admitted to the Minnesota bar in 1853. He constructed and set up the Saint Paul waterworks project. Gilfillan owned land in Minnesota including farm land in Redwood County, Minnesota. He died from heart problems at his home in Saint Paul, Minnesota.

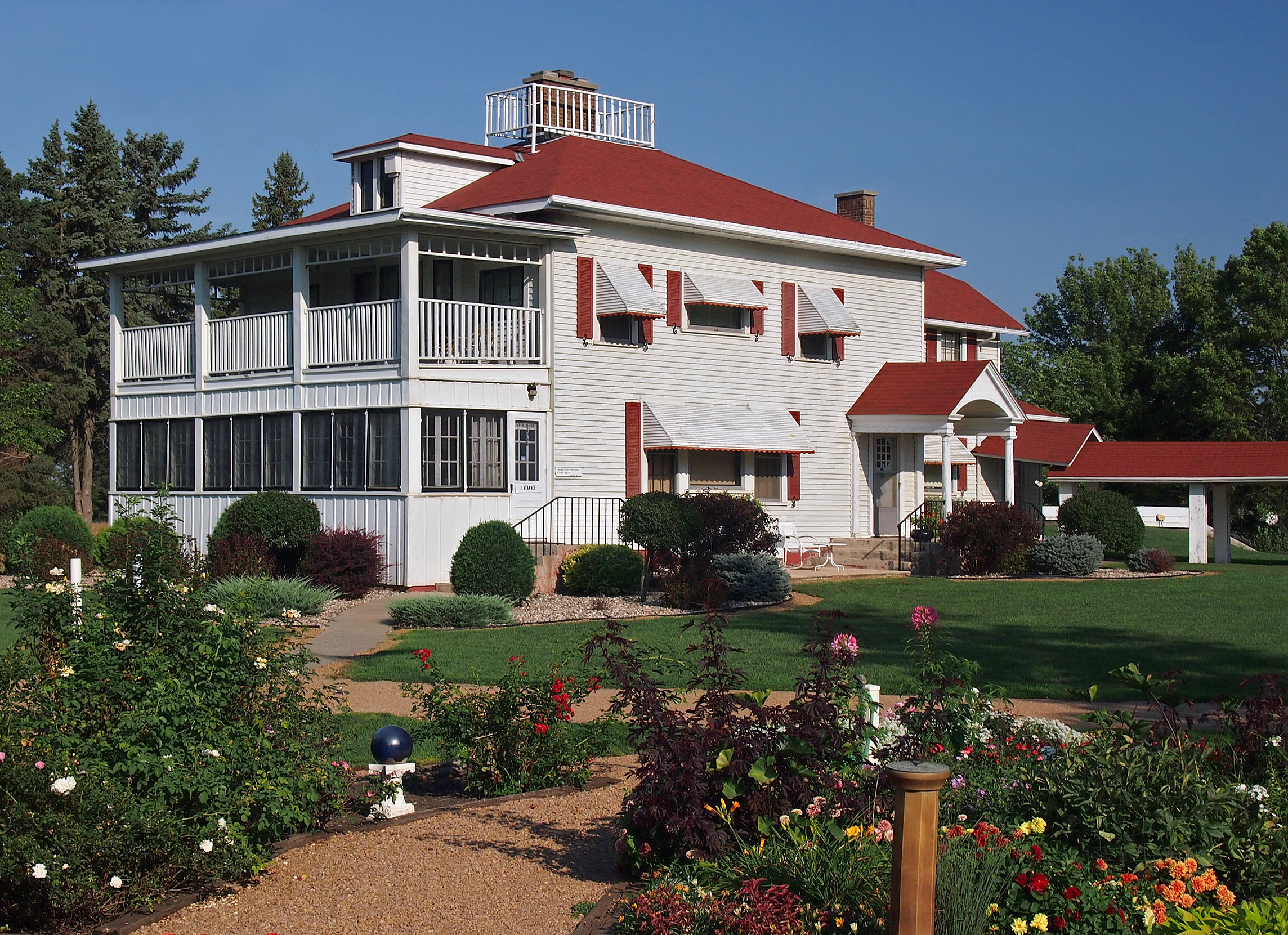
The Gilfillan Estate, Gilfillan, Minnesota

The 1882 farmstead of Gilfillan and his son is managed by the Redwood County Historical Society. The estate, which is listed on the National Register of Historic Places, showcases their promotion of progressive farming in southwest Minnesota and is associated with the alienation of seized Dakota reservation land.

== Politics ==
In 1865, Gilfillan ran for Governor of Minnesota. He was eliminated in the primary during the Republican State Convention.

Gilfillan served in the Minnesota House of Representatives in 1865 and 1876 and was a Republican. He then served in the Minnesota Senate from 1876 to 1886. Gilfillan was involved with the Minnesota Historical Society and the Minnesota Valley Historical Society.
