= Meriden Township, Steele County, Minnesota =

Meriden Township, Minnesota
- Township
- Location within the state of Minnesota Meriden Township, Minnesota (the United States)
- Coordinates: 44°4′28″N 93°20′50″W
- Country: United States
- State: Minnesota
- County: Steele

Area
  - Total: 36.1 sq mi (93.6 km^{2})
  - Land: 36.1 sq mi (93.5 km^{2})
  - Water: 0.077 sq mi (0.2 km^{2})
- Elevation: 1,161 ft (354 m)

Population (2000)
  - Total: 631
  - Density: 18/sq mi (6.8/km^{2})
- Time zone: UTC-6 (Central (CST))
  - Summer (DST): UTC-5 (CDT)
- FIPS code: 27-41750
- GNIS feature ID: 0664960

Meriden Township is a township in Steele County, Minnesota, United States. The population was 631 at the 2000 census.

== History ==
Meriden Township was organized in 1858, and named after Meriden, Connecticut.

== Geography ==
According to the United States Census Bureau, the township has a total area of 36.2 square miles (93.7 km^{2}), of which 36.1 square miles (93.5 km^{2}) is land and 0.1 square mile (0.2 km^{2}) (0.19%) is water.

== Demographics ==
As of the census of 2000, there were 631 people, 224 households, and 172 families residing in the township. The population density was 17.5 inhabitants per square mile (6.8/km^{2}). There were 231 housing units at an average density of 6.4 per square mile (2.5/km^{2}). The racial makeup of the township was 98.89% White, 0.79% Asian, and 0.32% from two or more races. Hispanic or Latino of any race were 0.16% of the population.

There were 224 households, out of which 33.9% had children under the age of 18 living with them, 66.1% were married couples living together, 5.4% had a female householder with no husband present, and 22.8% were non-families. 15.2% of all households were made up of individuals, and 5.4% had someone living alone who was 65 years of age or older. The average household size was 2.82 and the average family size was 3.14.

In the township the population was spread out, with 26.3% under the age of 18, 10.3% from 18 to 24, 25.4% from 25 to 44, 23.6% from 45 to 64, and 14.4% who were 65 years of age or older. The median age was 38 years. For every 100 females, there were 106.9 males. For every 100 females age 18 and over, there were 106.7 males.

The median income for a household in the township was $51,477, and the median income for a family was $55,625. Males had a median income of $34,286 versus $24,545 for females. The per capita income for the township was $21,162. About 2.8% of families and 4.1% of the population were below the poverty line, including 2.0% of those under age 18 and 5.2% of those age 65 or over.

== Notable person ==
- Hiram Drache, historian-in-residence at Concordia College, Moorhead, Minnesota and author on agriculture and the history of North Dakota.
