= William Sprigg Hall =

American politician

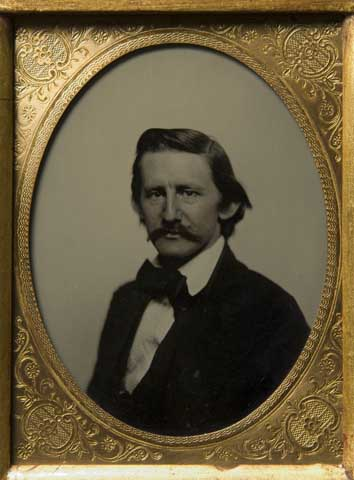
William Sprigg Hall in 1857

William Sprigg Hall (July 9, 1832 – February 25, 1875) was an American lawyer and politician.

Hall was born in Anne Arundel County, Maryland and went to Saint John's College in Maryland. He moved to Saint Paul, Minnesota with his wife in 1854 and was admitted to the Minnesota bar. Hall served as the Minnesota Superintendent of Common Schools from 1856 to 1858. He then served in the Minnesota Senate representing Minnesota's 2nd Senate District from 1857 to 1860 and was a Democrat. Hall then served as the Minnesota Court of Common Pleas judge from 1866 until his death in 1875. He died while on a train returning to Minnesota from the eastern United States.
