= Sylvanus Lowry =

American politician

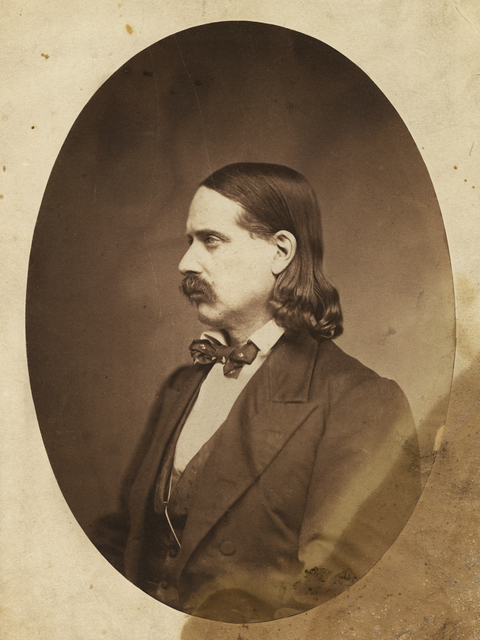

Member of the Minnesota Senate from the 3rd District
- In office January 7, 1862 – February 22, 1862
- Governor: Alexander Ramsey
- Preceded by: Seth Gibbs
- Succeeded by: William S. Moore

Member of the Minnesota Territorial Council from the 5th District
- In office January 7, 1852 – January 3, 1854
- Governor: Alexander Ramsey; Willis A. Gorman

Adjutant General of Minnesota
- In office 1852 – May 1853
- Governor: Alexander Ramsey; Willis A. Gorman
- Preceded by: James McClellan Boal
- Succeeded by: Isaac Van Etten

Personal details
- Born: July 24, 1823 Princeton, Kentucky, U.S.
- Died: December 21, 1865 (aged 42) St. Cloud, Minnesota, U.S.
- Resting place: North Star Cemetery, St. Cloud, Minnesota, U.S.

Sylvanus B. Lowry (July 24, 1824 – 1865) was an American Democratic political boss, newspaper publisher and pioneer in St. Cloud, Minnesota before the American Civil War. He moved there from Kentucky, bringing slaves with him as laborers. He was a profiteer of slavery-related-enterprises. He was elected to the Territorial Council, as the first president of the town council (the office of city mayor did not yet exist), and to the Minnesota State Senate in 1862.

Repeatedly attacked in writing by the abolitionist newspaper publisher Jane Swisshelm, he found his political influence reduced. He started a rival paper The Union. He died young in 1865.

== Early life and education ==
Born in Kentucky, Lowry became a trader and slaveowner. His father was David Lowry, a Scottish-American Cumberland Presbyterian minister and missionary to the Winnebago people in northeast Iowa.

== Migration ==
In 1847, the Lowry family followed the Winnebago as they were forcibly moved to a new Reservation surrounding Long Prairie, Minnesota. Lowry settled in Brockway Township, about 10 miles north of Saint Cloud, along the Mississippi River. He moved into St. Cloud in 1853. His success as a fur trader enabled him to build a large mansion there. His father, a Presbyterian minister who established a Cumberland mission; and his sister Elizabeth and her husband also migrated to St. Cloud by 1854. Lowry took slaves with him as laborers, although the territory residents had voted to have it be "free" or without slavery. Initially, Lowry ran a very wide and very profitable network trading with the Indians for furs.

More slave-owning Southerners entered the state after 1857, when the US Supreme Court ruled in the Dred Scott case that, as slaves were not citizens, they had no standing to file freedom suits. Its decision also that the Missouri Compromise was unconstitutional meant that Minnesota was unable to enforce its laws against slavery. Although the numbers of slaves were not high, several counties around and including St. Cloud had populations of slaves brought by Southerner vacationers before the American Civil War. When the war broke out, most of the Southerners left, taking their slaves with them.

According to historian Christopher Lehman:

The Majority of Minnesotan opposed making slavery legal in their territory. Some wanted the practice abolished nationwide, but most opponents simply did not want the economic competition that slavery threatened. Minnesota's government officials did not want wealthy slaveholders to replace them as the territory's political leaders, and working-class laborers did not want competition with slave labor to cause their wages to decline.

— Christopher P. Lehman, Slavery's Reach (2019)

== Political career ==
Lowry became active in the Democratic Party in the territory. He was elected to the Minnesota Territorial Council, serving from 1852 to 1854. the town council voted him council president of the newly incorporated city in 1856.

Active in the state party, Lowry was being groomed to run as Lieutenant Governor. He is well known in Minnesota folklore for his conflict with the abolitionist newspaper publisher Jane Grey Swisshelm, who repeatedly attacked him for his slaveholding as well as for allegedly defrauding the Winnebago people, damaging his political influence. He started a rival paper, The Union, to offset her paper's opinions.

Lowry was elected to the Minnesota State Senate in 1862. He died of cancer in St. Cloud in 1865.
