= John McKusick =

American politician (1815–1900)

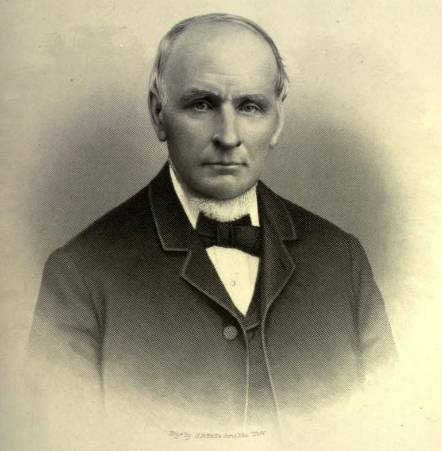

Member of the Minnesota Senate from the 2nd district
- In office January 6, 1863 – January 7, 1867

Personal details
- Born: December 18, 1815 Cornish, Maine, U.S.
- Died: October 26, 1900 (aged 84) Stillwater, Minnesota, U.S.
- Cause of death: Liver disease
- Occupation: Lumberman, politician

John McKusick (December 18, 1815 – October 26, 1900) was an American lumberman, politician, and pioneer who served four terms as a Minnesota state senator from 1863 to 1867. He was the first mayor of Stillwater, Minnesota, and built the city's first lumber mill.

== Early life ==
Born in Cornish, Maine, in 1815, John McKusick received a common school education before traveling to Illinois in 1839. In 1840, he moved to St. Croix Falls, Wisconsin Territory, and became a lumberman. In 1847, he married Phebe Greely, but she died shortly thereafter. He was soon remarried to Servia Greely in November 1849, with whom he had children Newton, Chester, and Ella.

== Political career ==
McKusick began his political career as Stillwater's postmaster. He later served as the first Mayor of Stillwater in 1854, the year the city was incorporated. From 1863 to 1867, he served four terms as a Minnesota state senator from the 2nd district, representing Chisago, Kanabec, Pine, and Washington County.

== Later life ==
On February 18, 1887, Servia died, and McKusick once again remarried a few years thereafter, this time to Ella Knapp.

McKusick died of liver disease on October 26, 1900, in Stillwater. Following his death, his estate was estimated to be worth $100,000 – equivalent to $3,870,000 in 2025 – to $150,000, equivalent to $5,805,000 in 2025.

== Bibliography ==
- Easton, Augustus B., ed. (1909). History of the Saint Croix Valley. Vol. I. Chicago, IL: H.C. Cooper, Jr. & Co.
- Folsom, W. H. C. (1888). Edwards, E. E. (ed.). Fifty Years in the Northwest. St. Paul, MN: Pioneer Press Company. LCCN rc01001070.
