= List of county courthouses in Washington =

List of county courthouses in the U.S. state of Washington

This is a list of Washington county courthouses.

Courthouse	Image	Location	Built	Notes
Adams County Courthouse		Ritzville, Adams County	1941	
Asotin County Courthouse		Asotin, Asotin County	1938	
Benton County Courthouse		Prosser, Benton County	1927	
Chelan County Courthouse		Wenatchee, Chelan County	1924	
Clallam County Courthouse		Port Angeles, Clallam County	1914	
Clark County Courthouse		Vancouver, Clark County	1940	
Columbia County Courthouse		Dayton, Columbia County	1887	It is the oldest courthouse in the Washington state
Cowlitz County Courthouse		Kelso, Cowlitz County	1923	
Douglas County Courthouse		Waterville, Douglas County	1905	
Ferry County Courthouse		Republic, Ferry County	1936	
Franklin County Courthouse		Pasco, Franklin County	1912	
Garfield County Courthouse		Pomeroy, Garfield County	1901	
Grant County Courthouse		Ephrata, Grant County	1917	
Grays Harbor County Courthous		Montesano, Grays Harbor County	1911	
Island County Courthouse		Coupeville, Island County	1948	
Jefferson County Courthouse		Port Townsend, Jefferson County	1890	
King County Courthouse		Seattle, King County	1916	
Kitsap County Courthouse		Port Orchard, Kitsap County	1932	
Kittitas County Courthouse		Ellensburg, Kittitas County	1955	
Klickitat County Courthouse		Goldendale, Klickitat County	1941	
Lewis County Courthouse		Chehalis, Lewis County	1927	Neo-classical Beaux-Arts architecture courthouse completed in 1927. Added to the National Register of Historic Places in 2014.
Lincoln County Courthouse		Davenport, Lincoln County	1897	
Mason County Courthouse		Shelton, Mason County	1929	
Okanogan County Courthouse		Okanogan, Washington, Okanogan County	1916	The National Register of Historic Places listing with reference number 95000805
Pacific County Courthouse		South Bend, Pacific County	1910	
Pend Oreille County Courthouse		Newport, Pend Oreille County	1915	
Pierce County Courthouse (County-City Building)		Tacoma, Pierce County	1958	
San Juan County Courthouse		Friday Harbor, San Juan County	1910	
Skagit County Courthouse		Mount Vernon, Skagit County	1924	
Skamania County Courthouse		Stevenson, Skamania County	1949	
Snohomish County Courthouse		Everett, Snohomish County	1967	
Spokane County Courthouse		Spokane, Spokane County	1895	
Stevens County Courthouse		Colville, Stevens County	1938	
Thurston County Courthouse		Olympia, Thurston County	1930	
Wahkiakum County Courthouse		Cathlamet, Wahkiakum County	1921	
Walla Walla County Courthouse		Walla Walla, Walla Walla County	1916	
Whatcom County Courthouse		Bellingham, Whatcom County	1950	
Whitman County Courthouse		Colfax, Whitman County	1955	
Yakima County Courthouse		Yakima, Yakima County	1941, 1963	
