= Nettleton's Addition Historic District =

Historic district in Spokane, Washington

- U.S. National Register of Historic Places
- U.S. Historic district
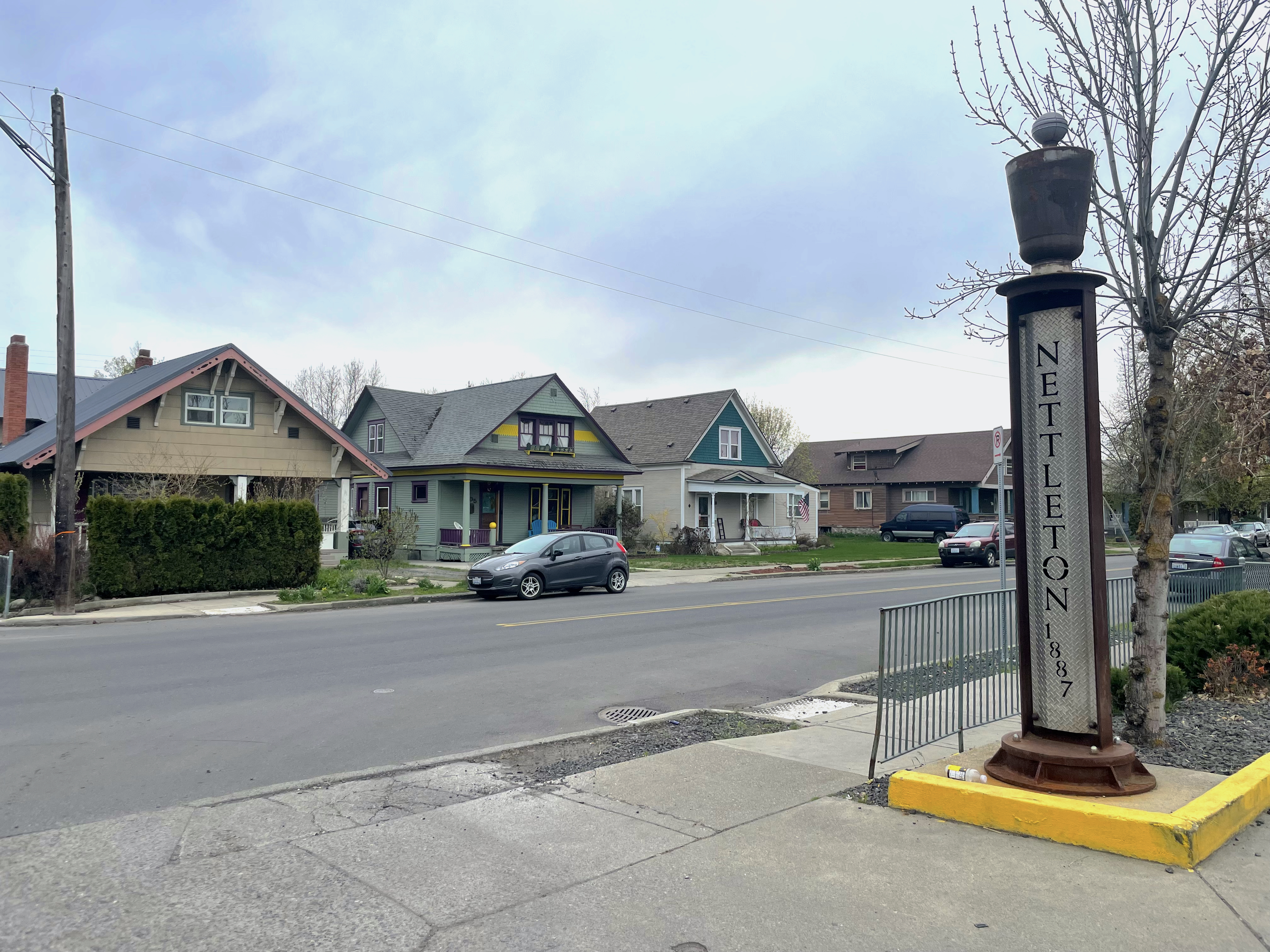
- Sign at the entrance to Nettleton's Addition on Boone Ave.

- Location within Washington (state) Location within the United States
- Location: West Central, Spokane, Washington, United States
- Coordinates: 47°40′01.6″N 117°26′54.7″W
- Area: 236 acres (96 ha)
- Built: 1887–1954
- Architect: Multiple
- Architectural style: Queen Anne Revival, Shingle style, Colonial Revival, Tudor Revival, Bungalow, American Craftsman, Ranch-style
- NRHP reference No.: 06000176
- Added to NRHP: March 22, 2006

The Nettleton's Addition Historic District is a historic residential district in the West Central neighborhood of Spokane, Washington. It was listed on the National Register of Historic Places (NRHP) in 2006 because of the concentration of historic homes in one of Spokane's oldest residential neighborhoods and for its significance as an example of community planning and development and in the area of architecture. It is the largest national historic district in the state of Washington.

Located on a flat plateau surrounded on three sides by a bend in the Spokane River about a mile-and-a-half northwest of the center of Downtown Spokane, the area's proximity to the city center made it one of the first residential areas developed in Spokane. The neighborhood was platted in 1887 and largely developed by 1911. Architectural styles represented in the district include Queen Anne Revival, shingle style, Colonial Revival, Tudor Revival, Bungalow, American Craftsman, as well as a dozen ranch-style homes which were built after 1937 and are not considered to be contributing properties to the historic district. At the time of its listing on the NRHP in 2006, Nettleton's Addition consisted of 949 properties on 1002 parcels, of which 536 are considered to be historic contributing buildings. Notable architects who worked in the neighborhood include Kirtland Cutter and Karl Malmgren.

A working and middle-class neighborhood from the time of its development through to the present day, Nettleton's Addition consists primarily of one-to-two story single-family homes built of wood. Nettleton's Addition was laid out in a grid pattern with sidewalks on every street and alleys running east-to-west in the middle of each block. The only disruptions to this pattern come in the northern and southwestern edges of the district where the terrain drops off dramatically to the river and in one block in the northeastern portion of the district where the Holmes Elementary campus takes up the entire block.

== Setting ==
Nettleton's Addition is located in the western portion of the West Central neighborhood of Spokane, about a mile-and-a-half northwest of the center of Downtown Spokane. The district is located on a flat plateau at approximately 1,880 feet above sea level. The Spokane River bends around the district to the south, west and north forming a deep gorge which falls off from the plateau more than 200 feet over a distance of less than one city block. The historic district is bounded by Summit Boulevard and Mission Avenue on the north, Chestnut Street on the east, Bridge Avenue on the south, and A Street and Summit Boulevard on the west.

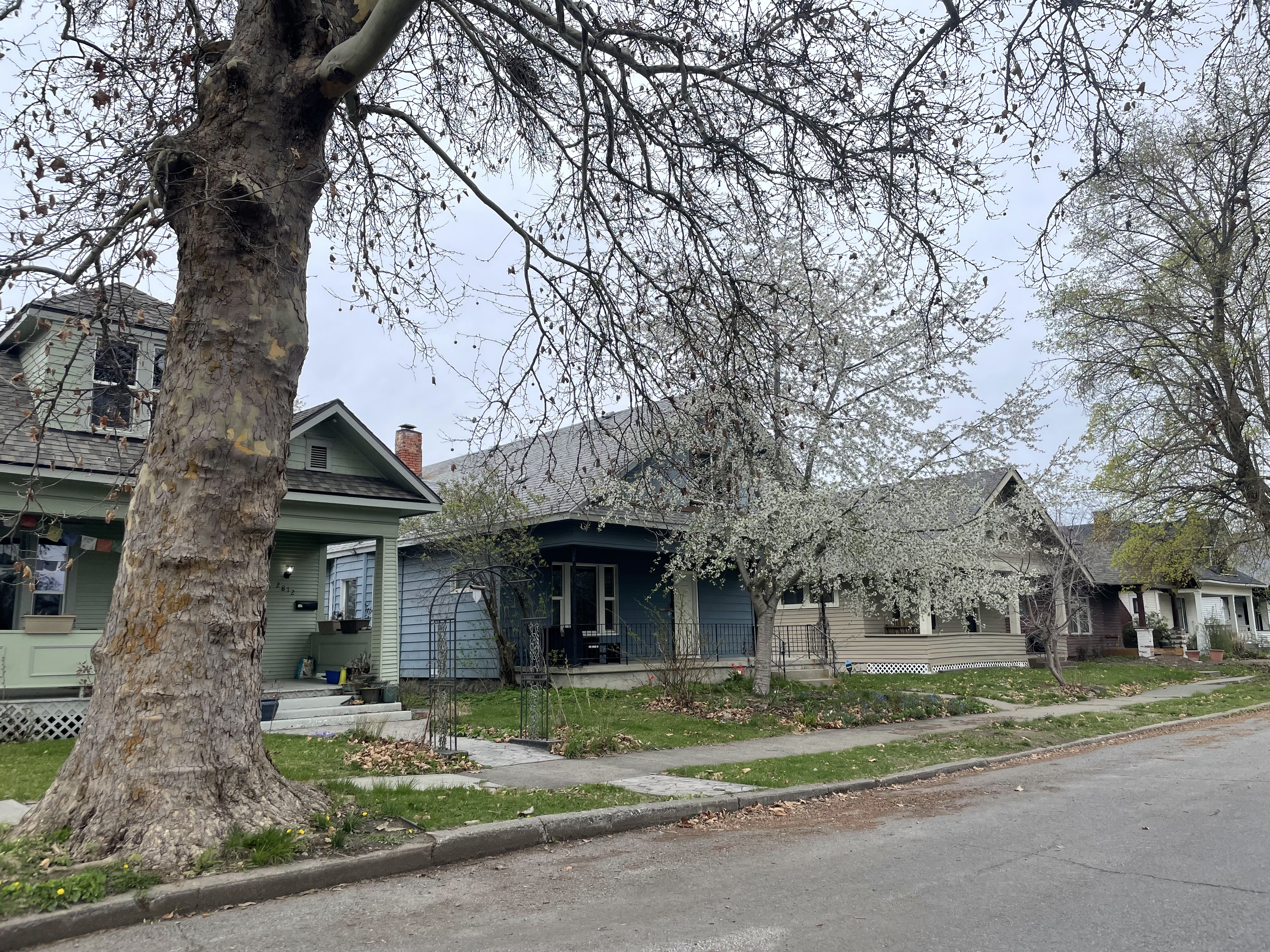
Typical homes on Mallon Avenue

The neighborhood, like those which surround it, was platted on a grid system with east–west blocks roughly 600 feet long and the north–south blocks varying between 250 and 360 feet. Mid-block alleyways run through the middle of each block east-to-west. Streets in the area are 60 feet wide with sidewalks separated from the road by a planting strip. While surrounded by the river on three sides, the district is mostly inland from the river with the exception of two blocks in the north and one block in the south that overlook the river gorge.

To the south, beyond Bridge Avenue, is the Kendall Yards development which was built in the 2010s on the site of a former rail yard. This new development across the street from Nettleton's Addition has sparked fears that gentrification will come to the longtime working-class neighborhood.

== History ==
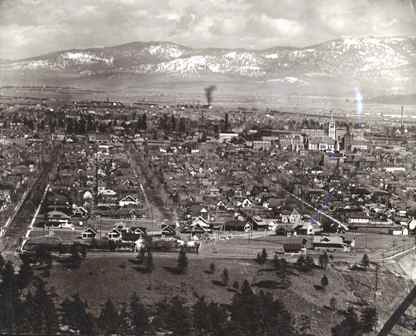
Nettleton's Addition circa 1909

The city of Spokane was first settled in 1873 and officially incorporated in 1881. What is now Nettleton's Addition became one of the earliest residential areas in the city when it was platted as Nettleton's First Addition and Nettleton's Second Addition in 1887. The area was annexed into the city of Spokane in 1891. The earliest construction in the district began in 1880, but most of the development took place in the years immediately following the turn of the century. As Spokane's population boomed in the first decade of the 20th century, Nettleton's Addition saw high levels of development, with 724 of the 949 buildings still standing in 2006 constructed between 1900 and 1912.

Despite their proximity to the commercial center of Spokane, being roughly a mile-and-a-half from where the city was initially founded, Nettleton's Addition, West Central and the broader area north of the river from the original settlement were initially considered quite remote. The Spokane Falls and the river's gorge when extends downstream from there made crossing to the north bank difficult. Development was opened up in 1889 when a wooden precursor to the Monroe Street Bridge was built to span the river.

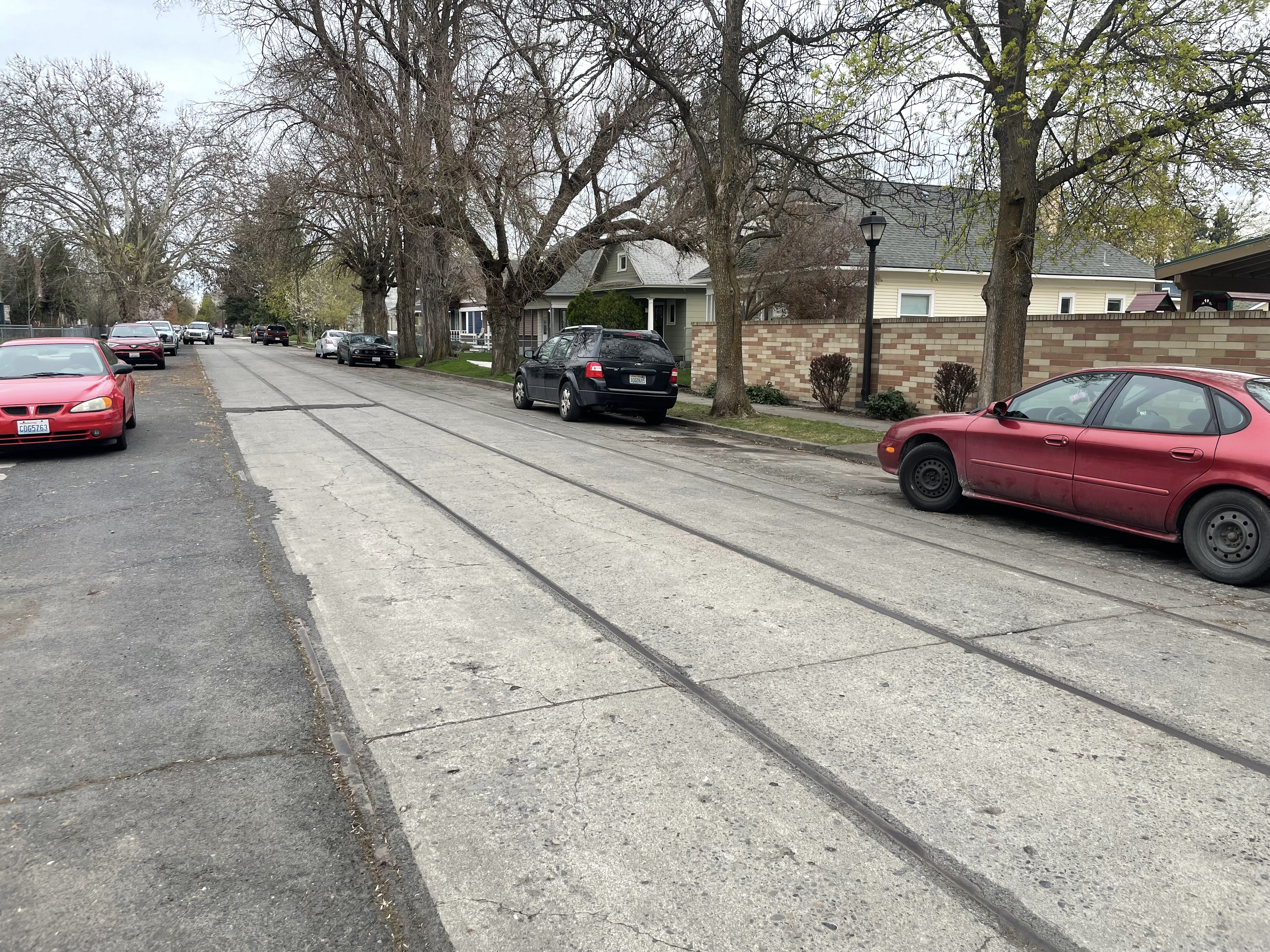
Streetcar tracks visible on Dean Avenue

Developed as a streetcar suburb by William Nettleton along with his son and nephew, Nettleton's Addition reflected many traits of suburban development of the day. With an influx of workers moving into the rapidly growing city, simple homes were built on pattern book designs to house the growing population. Streetcars connected the neighborhood to the downtown core and the rest of the city, as well as to a destination recreational park on the other side of the addition to help draw visitors and potential residents into the area. The park, located just west of Nettleton's Addition along the Spokane River, was developed in 1892 and 1893 and would eventually become known as Natatorium Park for its indoor swimming pool facility.

The early history of development in Nettleton's Addition, and the wider West Central neighborhood as a whole, is inextricably linked to the streetcar lines. The Washington Water Power company was founded in 1889 to manage the city's hydroelectric potential. The company also took over management of the city's streetcar network, which had initially been built by real estate developers. Many of those developers would end up on the board of directors at Washington Water Power, including the developer of the Twickenham Addition to the west of Nettleton's Addition and across the river, the developer of Sherwood Addition immediately to the west of Nettleton's Addition, and the owner of the Pettet Tract immediately to the north of Nettletton's Addition. These developers also sat on the board of a cable railway company which served the area as well. Spokane's streetcars were replaced with busses in 1936, but the tracks remain visible in the road in places around Nettleton's Addition.

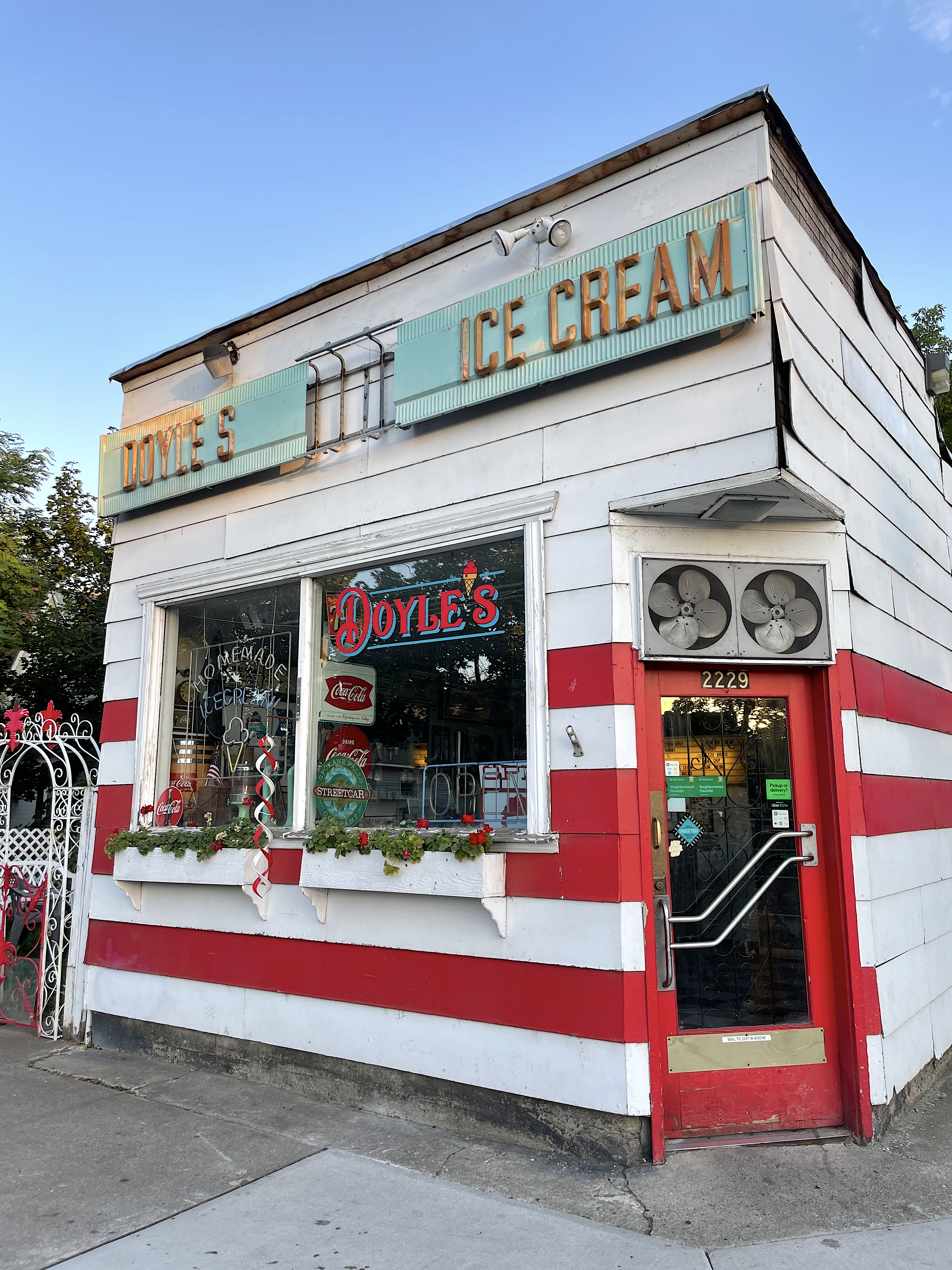
Doyle's Ice Cream Parlor

After the boom years of the first decade of the 20th century, development came to a virtual halt not only in Nettleton's Addition but around the city as a whole. Spokane's population exploded from 36,000 in 1900 to 104,402 in 1910, but would only grow by 35 people between 1910 and 1920. This rapid decline in growth left some lots unoccupied in Nettleton's Addition until growth resumed again after World War II.

Though the area is mostly residential, it is also home to Doyle's Ice Cream Parlor which has been in business in the neighborhood since 1939. Doyle's is listed as a contributing property to the historic district.

The working-class neighborhood fell into decline by the early 1970s, when the rail yards immediately south of the addition, in what is now the Kendall Yards development, were abandoned. Nettleton's Addition and the wider West Central neighborhood became known as a run-down and crime-infested part of the city. The area became known as "Felony Flats" and the moniker stuck even into the 2010s as gentrification spurred by the construction of Kendall Yards began to encroach into the rest of West Central including Nettleton's Addition.

== See also ==
- West Central, Spokane
- National Register of Historic Places listings in Spokane County, Washington
