= Joel Cruttenden =

American politician (1822–1899)

- Cruttenden c. 1858

Register of the United States General Land Office
- In office 1860–1861
- Appointed by: James Buchanan

Member of the Minnesota Senate from the 21st District
- In office December 7, 1859 – January 7, 1861

Member of the Minnesota House of Representatives from the 21st District
- In office December 2, 1857 – December 6, 1859
- Preceded by: Position established
- Succeeded by: Peter Roy

Personal details
- Born: Joel Douglas Cruttenden; March 2, 1822 Georgetown, Washington, D.C., U.S.
- Died: April 17, 1899 (aged 77) Columbus, Ohio, U.S.

Military service
- Allegiance: United States of America
- Branch/service: Union Army
- Years of service: 1861–1865
- Rank: Colonel
- Unit: United States Army Quartermaster Corps
- Battles/wars: American Civil War

Joel Douglas Cruttenden (March 2, 1822 – April 17, 1899), sometimes written as J.D. Cruttenden, was an American fur trader, politician, and military officer. Cruttenden served in the Minnesota Legislature before being appointed as the Register of the United States Land Office in St. Cloud, Minnesota by President of the United States, James Buchanan.

== Early life and career ==
Cruttenden was born on March 2, 1822 in the Georgetown neighborhood of Washington, D.C.. In 1838 Cruttenden moved to St. Louis, in 1846 Cruttenden moved to Prairie du Chien in Wisconsin Territory. While in Wisconsin, Cruttenden was employed by the fur traders Bernard Walter Brisbois and Henry M. Rice. While employed by Rice Cruttenden spent the winter of 1849 on Madeline Island as a fur trader.

Cruttenden moved west to Minnesota Territory and settled in Saint Paul where he worked as a trader to the Indigenous Dakota people alongside Roswell P. "R.P." Russel. Russell later served in the Minnesota Territorial Legislature. Cruttenden eventually relocated to Old Crow Wing, Minnesota where he was the business partner of Indian trader and politician James W. Lynd.

== Political career ==
=== Minnesota House ===
Beginning in 1857 Cruttenden campaigned for political office for a seat in the Minnesota House of Representatives, representing Minnesota's 21st House district. At the time the district included Crow Wing County, Mille Lacs County, and Morrison County. Cruttenden won the October 13, 1857 election and served during the 1st Minnesota Legislature, which was a protracted session, from December 2, 1857 to December 6, 1859. During his term he served on the printing committee and was the chair of the incorporations committee.

=== Minnesota Senate ===
Cruttenden later ran for a seat in the Minnesota Senate representing Minnesota's 21st Senate district. Cruttenden won the October 12, 1858 election and served in the 2nd Minnesota Legislature from December 7, 1859 to January 7, 1860. During his term, Cruttenden was a member of the Indian affairs committee and the internal improvements committee.

=== United States Land Office ===
In 1859 Cruttenden was appointed as the Register of the United States Land Office in St. Cloud, Minnesota by President of the United States, James Buchanan.

== Military career ==
During the American Civil War Cruttenden served as a captain in the United States Army Quartermaster Corps. He was promoted to the rank of colonel and was mustered out of service in 1865.

== Later life and death ==
After moving to Bayfield, Wisconsin in 1869, Cruttenden served in a variety of local political and nonpolitical offices and appointments, including an appointment by Grover Cleveland as the postmaster of Bayfield. From 1872 to 1890 Cruttenden worked as the register of deeds for Bayfield. Cruttenden died on April 17, 1899 in Columbus, Ohio.

== Personal life ==
Cruttenden was married to Lucy F. Green of Granville, Ohio in 1861.
