= West Central, Spokane =

Neighborhood in Spokane, Washington, U.S.

West Central
- Spokane Neighborhood
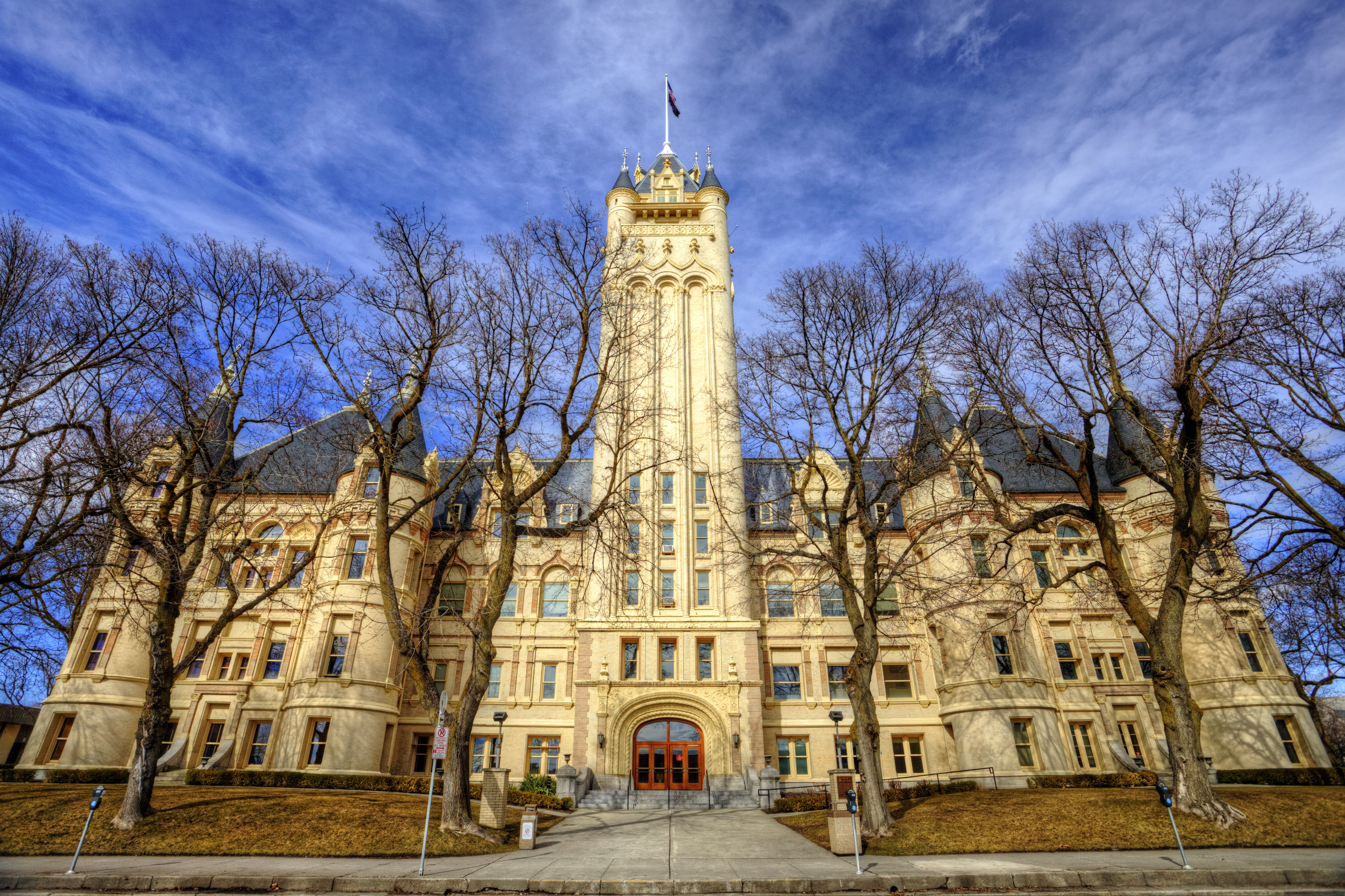
- Spokane County Courthouse in West Central

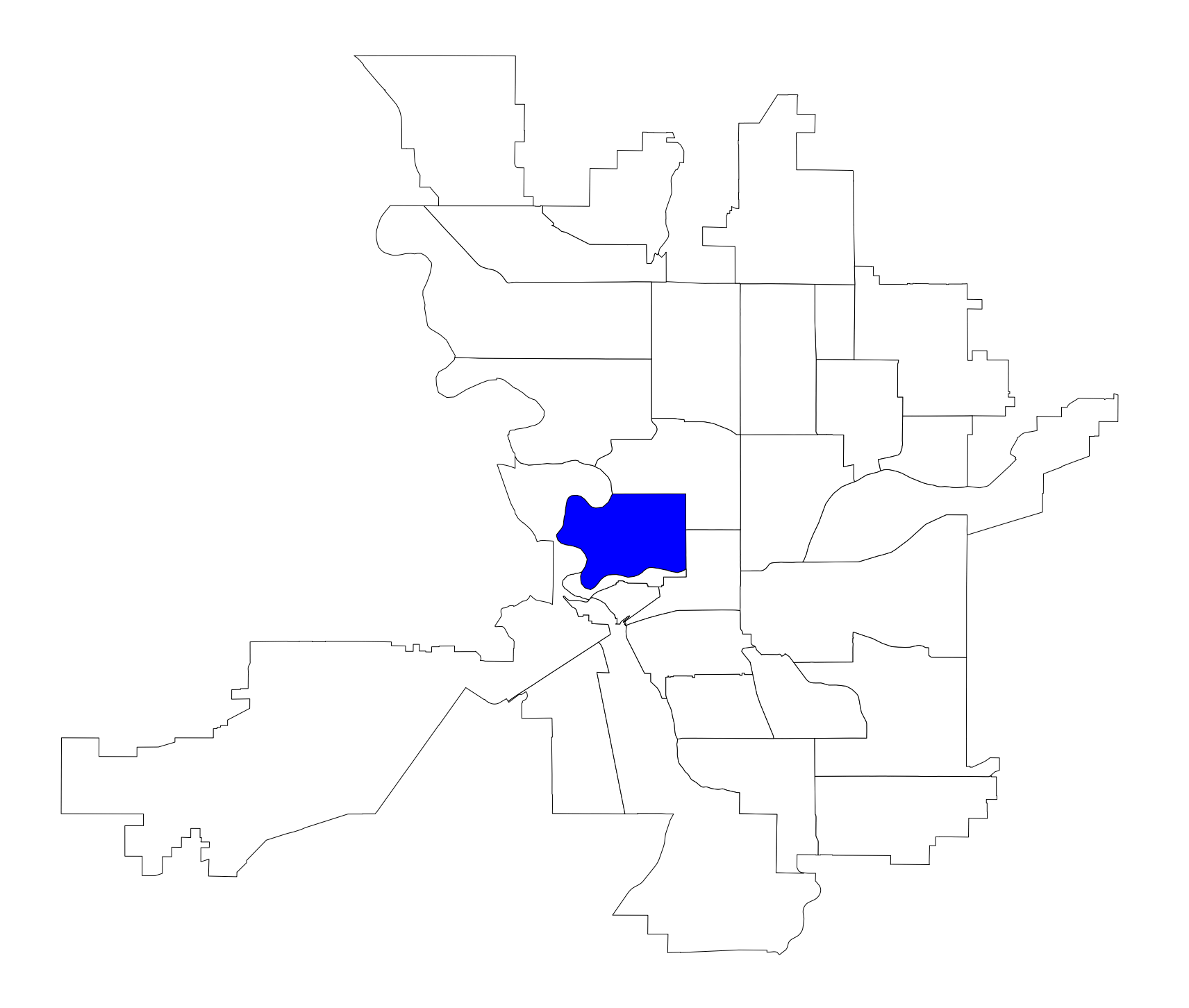
- Location within the city of Spokane
- Coordinates: 47°40′04.8″N 117°26′25.6″W
- Country: United States
- State: Washington
- County: Spokane
- City: Spokane

Population (2017)
  - Total: 8,754

Demographics 2017
  - White: 78.8%
  - Latinx: 8.5%
  - Native American: 5.2%
  - Black: 4.6%
  - Asian: 1.6%
- Time zone: UTC-8 (PST)
  - Summer (DST): UTC-7 (PDT)
- ZIP Codes: 99201, 99205 and 99260
- Area code: 509

West Central is a neighborhood in Spokane, Washington. As the name suggests it is located centrally on the west side of the city. Downtown Spokane is immediately east of the neighborhood, and spreads into West Central along Monroe Street in the Kendall Yards area. The neighborhood is diverse, with single and multi-family residential zones dating back to the early days of Spokane, a new mixed use development on the site of a former rail yard, the Spokane County Courthouse campus and associated government buildings and a few commercial districts. The Spokane River gorge winds around the southern and western edge of the neighborhood. It is home to Nettleton's Addition Historic District, which was added to the National Register of Historic Places in March 2006, and is also the largest historic district on the Washington State Heritage Register (as of 2005).

== Geography ==
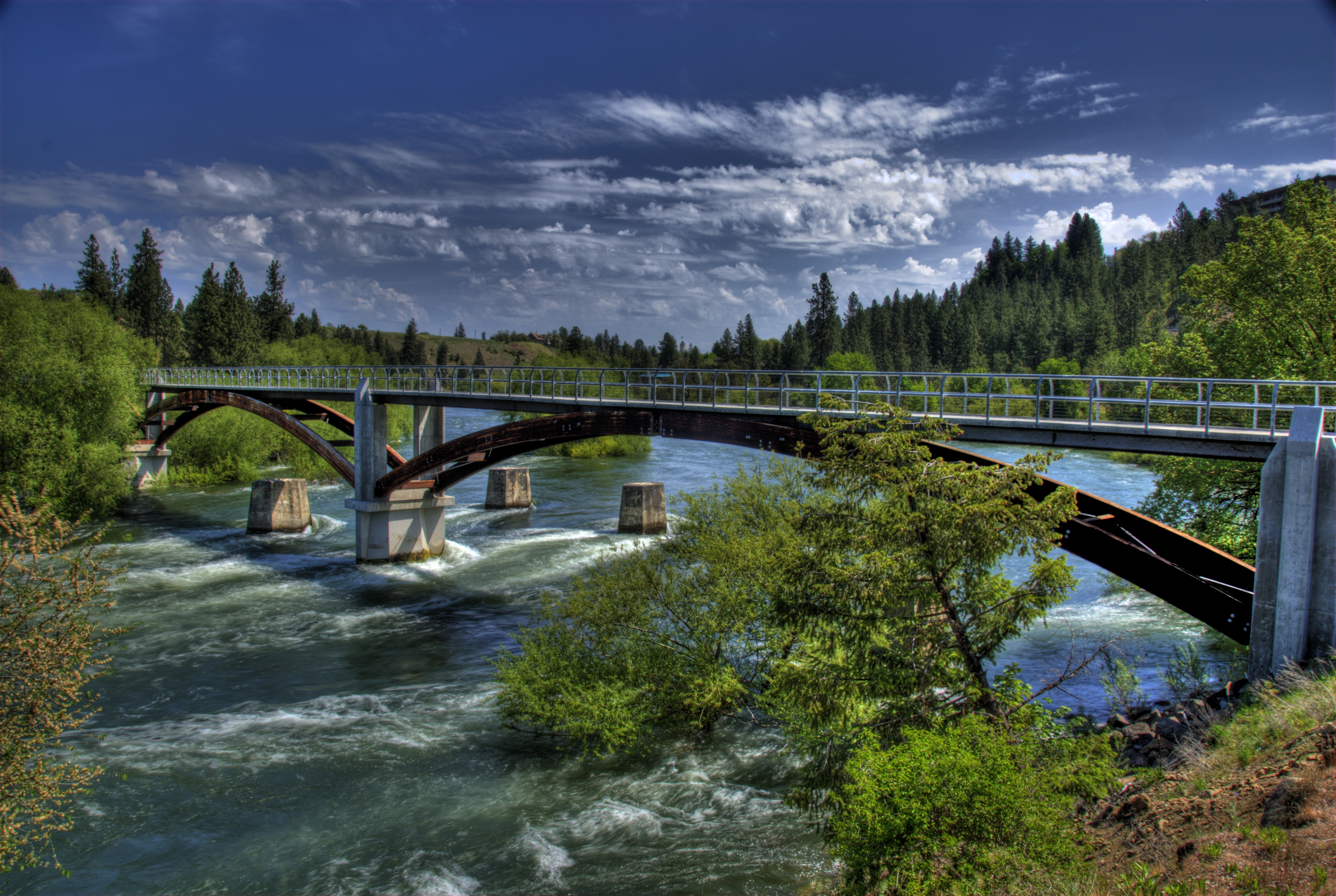
The Sandifur Memorial Bridge crosses the Spokane River into Peaceful Valley; West Central to the left

The Spokane River gorge is the dominant physical feature of the neighborhood and serves as its southern, western and northwestern boundary as the river winds its way downstream in a generally northwesterly direction away from Downtown Spokane. The terrain falls off dramatically from the largely flat plain of West Central more than 200 feet down to the river. The river separates West Central from the neighborhoods of Peaceful Valley on the south and West Hills on the west. Monroe Street, a major north–south thoroughfare and commercial district, serves as the eastern border of the neighborhood, beyond which lie the neighborhoods of Riverside and Emerson/Garfield. Indiana, an east–west thoroughfare, separates West Central from Emerson/Garfield on the north.

There are three crossings of the Spokane River providing access into West Central. On the eastern edge of the neighborhood the Monroe Street Bridge leads into the heart of downtown, in the center the Maple Street Bridge connects the west end of downtown with West Central, and on the western edge the Sandifur Bridge provides pedestrian access into Peaceful Valley.

The Spokane River Centennial Trail passes through the neighborhood, along the top of the bluff that follows the course of the river. It connects West Central with areas in northwest Spokane and beyond to Nine Mile Falls. To the east it follows the river through downtown Spokane, and out into the Spokane Valley to the Idaho state line.

=== Kendall Yards ===
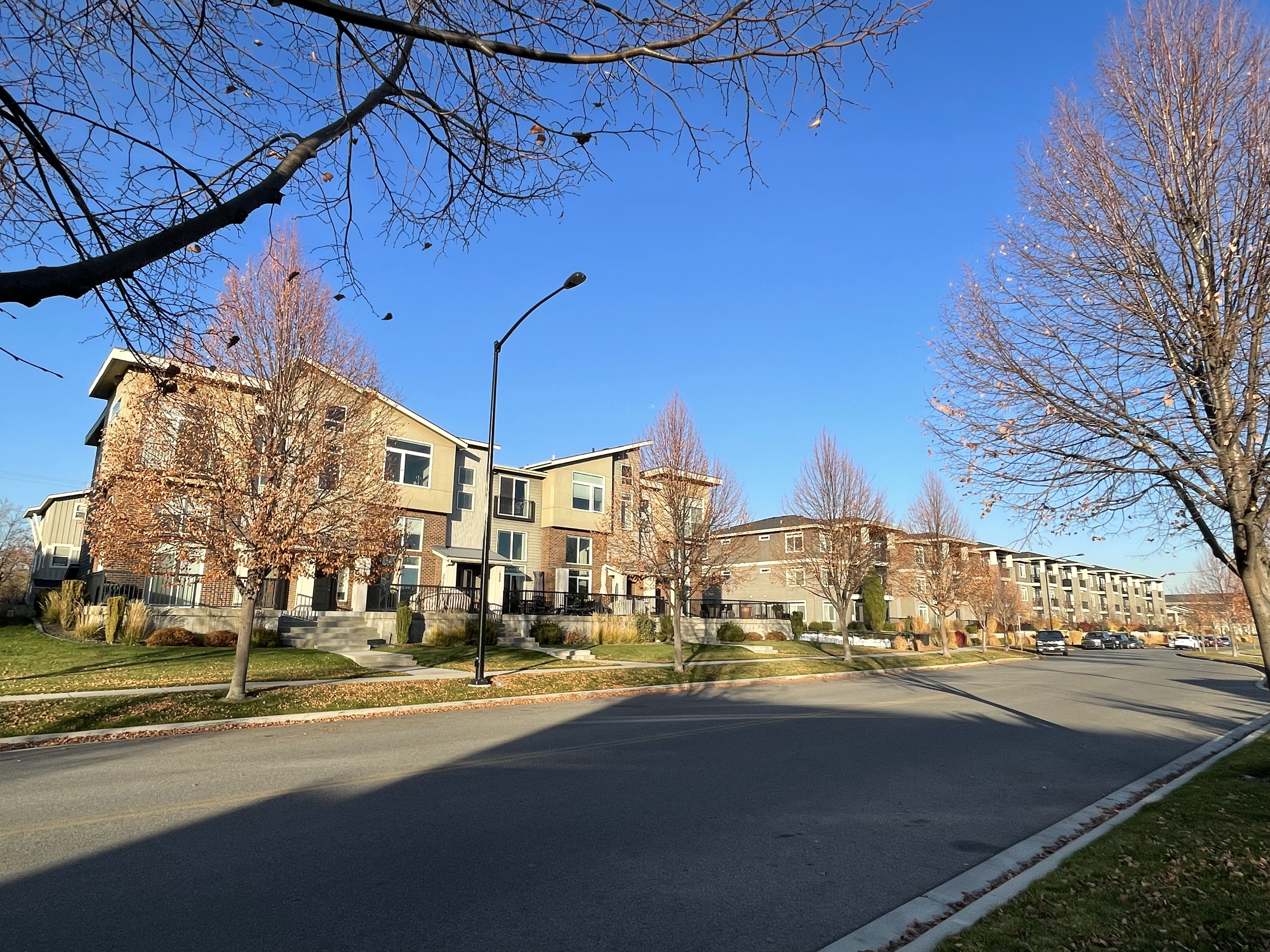
Residential development in Kendall Yards

Named for the Kendall Rail Yard that once took up the entirety of the southern section of West Central. The rail yard was moved in the 1970s, but the ground was contaminated by the former use and the site was left empty until the first decade of the 21st century. In the 2000s, a series of proposals for development were floated, but none came to fruition until 2010 when Greenstone Corporation's plan was approved. Since then, the Kendall Yards district has been expanding westward across the abandoned land. It is a mixed-use district with retail and multi-family housing on the east. Density decreases as the neighborhood moves further to the west, away from downtown. The multi-family buildings give way to townhouses and ultimately single-family housing.

The commercial district on the eastern end of Kendall Yards spills directly into Downtown Spokane across Monroe Street. It is home to numerous retail stores, restaurants and a grocery. From spring into fall, a few blocks of Summit Avenue in the heart of the commercial district are closed to automobiles every Wednesday evening for the Kendall Yards Night Market.

=== Nettleton's Addition Historic District ===
Nettleton's Addition Historic District makes up a significant portion of the residential area of Spokane's West Central neighborhood. Originally platted in 1887, 76% of the residential properties in the district were built between 1900 and 1912. Located in the historic district is Doyle's Ice Cream Parlor, which has been serving the neighborhood since 1939.

The district has played a large role in the streetcar-era of Spokane, and also reflects the typical lifecycle of American cities of rapid development, slow decline, and urban renewal.

Nettleton's Addition Historic District is located in the western portion of West Central and bounded on the south by Bridge Street, on the west by Summit and A Streets, on the north by Mission Avenue along the Spokane River bluff and on the east by Chestnut Street. It takes up an area of more than 38 square blocks.

== History ==
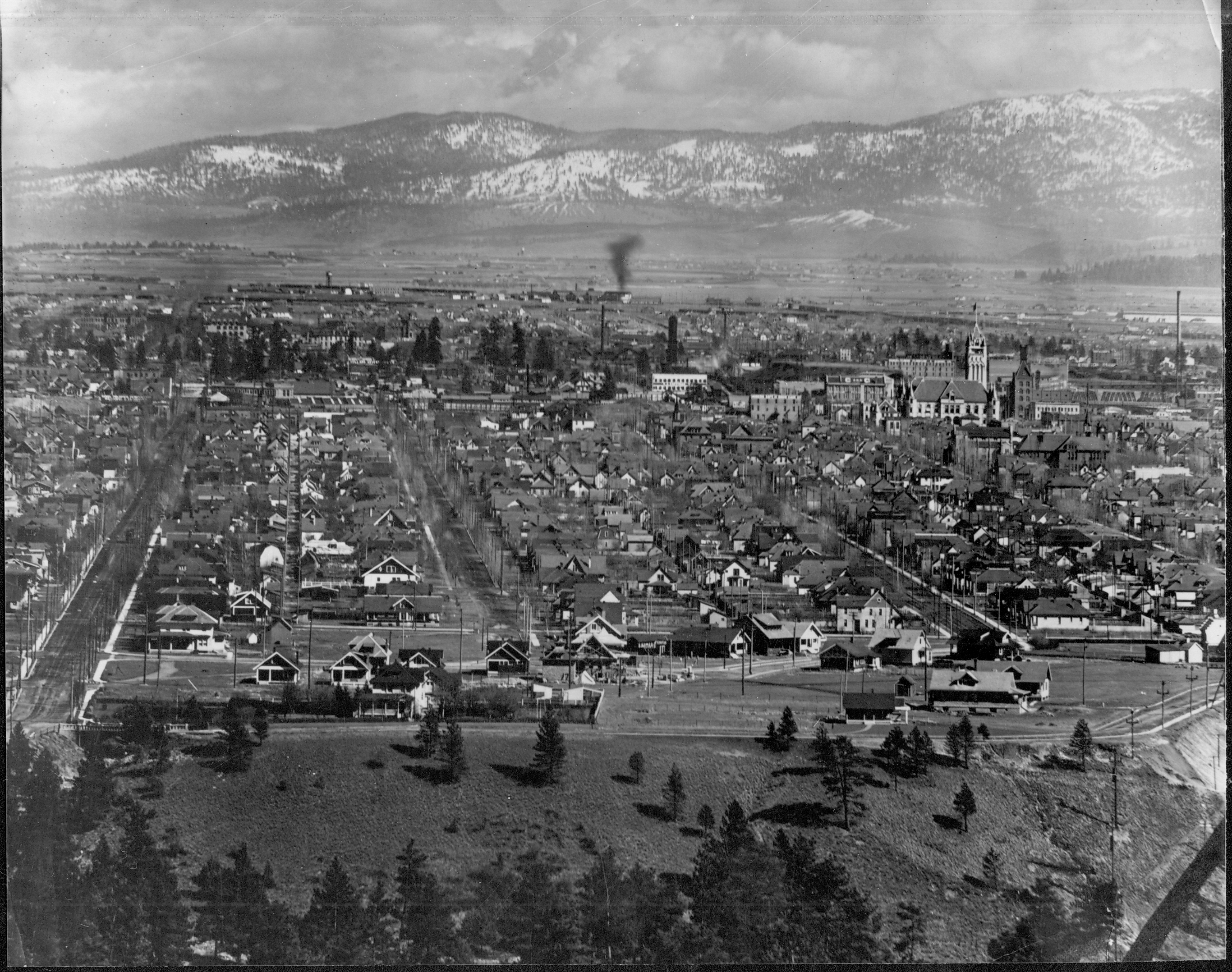
Nettleton's Addition circa 1909

For thousands of years, the Spokane people have lived in the place now known as West Central. Fishing camps were established on the banks of the river to take advantage of the great salmon runs in the area. These salmon runs came to an abrupt end in 1915 with the construction of a dam downstream that did not contain a fish ladder.

The first European settlement in the area came in 1879 when a Colonel Jenkins homesteaded in present-day West Central. In 1887, William Nettleton pushed development of the neighborhood forward when he bought and platted 278 acres in the area. The Spokane County Courthouse was completed on the eastern end of the neighborhood, on Broadway a block west of Monroe, in 1895. By the first decade of the 20th century, the neighborhood had been connected by bridge to the downtown core and was seen as a middle-class suburb of the city center. The neighborhood became home to a variety of architectural styles such as American Craftsman, Bungalow, Queen Anne and Victorian.

As the neighborhood grew during this period, the southern portion became dominated by railroads. The Northern Pacific Railroad and Union Pacific Railroad laid down lines in what is now Kendall Yards. From the 1880s through the early 1970s the area between Bridge Street and the Spokane River gorge was a rail yard. After the rail yards were abandoned in the 1970s, the southern fringe of West Central sat empty until the Kendall Yards development was constructed in the 21st century.

In 1925, the neighborhood became critical to Spokane's small but active Japanese community. In the decades prior, Japanese immigrants settled on the outskirts of Spokane and set up small vegetable farms. The Spokane Vegetable Growers Association was established by Frank Hirata at 1109 W. Ide Avenue on the eastern edge of West Central. In the middle of the 20th century the association was bought out by Shozo Higashi, who eventually moved it out of the neighborhood.

From 1887 through 1968, a flat area along the riverbank in the northwestern corner of West Central was home to Natatorium Park, a popular amusement park for people from all over the city. Trolley lines were laid around the neighborhood and city, connecting the park with the rest of the Spokane area. Initially known as Ingersoll Park when it was first developed, and then as Twickenham Park to reflect the common name of the area at the time, Twickenham Addition, it took on the Natatorium Park name in 1829. The park was home to a swimming pool, baseball diamond, hotel, casino and numerous amusement rides and roller-coasters. The Looff Carousel that now sits in Riverfront Park was originally housed at Natatorium Park.

=== Historic places ===
Along with the historic districts named above, West Central is home to 14 individual properties that are listed on the National Register of Historic Places (NRHP) on their own merit.

	Name on the Register	Image	Date listed	Location	Description
1	Harry and Catherine Bleeker House	Harry and Catherine Bleeker House	December 23, 2019 (#100004787)	1707 North West Point Rd. 47°40′22″N 117°26′45″W	
2	George and Nellie Canfield House	George and Nellie Canfield House	December 29, 2014 (#14001109)	1301 N. Sherwood St. 47°40′08″N 117°27′23″W	Built in 1908 in the Arts and Crafts and Craftsman styles.
3	John A. Finch Memorial Nurses Home	John A. Finch Memorial Nurses Home	May 28, 1991 (#91000631)	N. 852 Summit Blvd. 47°39′57″N 117°27′16″W	Built in 1929 in the Romanesque Revival style.
4	Grace Baptist Church	Grace Baptist Church	October 2, 1992 (#92001289)	1527 W. Mallon St. 47°39′55″N 117°26′03″W	Built in 1908 in the Gothic Revival style.
5	Knight House	Knight House	November 30, 1999 (#99001459)	1715 N. West Point Rd. 47°40′28″N 117°26′41″W	Built in 1910 by Kirtland Cutter and Karl G. Malmgren in the American Foursquare style.
6	Gustav Meese Building	Gustav Meese Building	February 16, 1996 (#96000049)	1727 Sinto Ave. 47°40′11″N 117°26′13″W	Built in 1905, one of the first industrial buildings in West Central and has been in use since its construction.
7	Muzzy-Shine House	Muzzy-Shine House	December 20, 2010 (#10001045)	1506 W. Mission Ave. 47°40′18″N 117°24′51″W	Built in 1889 in the Queen Anne style.
8	John and Mary Ralston House	John and Mary Ralston House	December 3, 2002 (#02001488)	2421 W. Mission Ave. 47°40′17″N 117°26′53″W	Built in 1900 in the Tudor Revival style, with some design by Kirtland Cutter.
9	Richardson-Jackson House	Richardson-Jackson House	March 22, 2006 (#06000178)	1226 N. Summit Blvd. 47°40′13″N 117°27′29″W	Built in 1906 in the American Foursquare style.
10	Edwin A. Smith House	Edwin A. Smith House	August 23, 1985 (#85001808)	N. 1414 Summit Blvd. 47°40′14″N 117°27′19″W	Built in 1912 in the Tudor Revival style.
11	Spokane County Courthouse	Spokane County Courthouse	January 21, 1974 (#74001980)	W. 1116 Broadway; 47°39′54″N 117°25′40″W	Built 1894-95 and designed by Willis Ritchie in the French Renaissance style. One of the dominant facets of Spokane's skyline since its construction.
12	Spokane Fire Station No. 3	Spokane Fire Station No. 3	December 9, 1994 (#94001439)	1229 N. Monroe St. 47°40′09″N 117°25′33″W	Built in 1912, currently home to Spokane Public Radio.
13	Spokane Sash and Door Company Flats	Spokane Sash and Door Company Flats	August 24, 2005 (#05000924)	1302-1312 W Broadway Ave. 47°40′00″N 117°25′52″W	Built in 1909 by Kirtland Cutter in the Tudor Revival style with multi-gabled rooflines.
14	Dr. Charles and Elsie Thomas House	Dr. Charles and Elsie Thomas House	August 15, 2007 (#07000834)	1212 N. Summit Blvd. 47°40′12″N 117°27′28″W	Built in 1907 by Kirtland Cutter and Karl G. Malmgren in the Mission Revival style.

== Demographics ==
As of 2017, there were 8,754 residents in the neighborhood across 3,424 households, of which 21.9% had children. 56.7% of households were rented, compared to 45.3% citywide. 23.5% of the residents were aged 19 or younger, compared to 21.9% citywide. Those over 65 made up 10.4% of the population, compared to 14.5% citywide. The median household income was $28,249, compared to $44,768 citywide. 15.8% of the population had a bachelor's degree or higher, while 29.9% had at most a high school diploma. The unemployment rate was 12% compared to 6.5% citywide. 63.1% of students qualify for free or reduced lunch, compared to 54.5% citywide.

== Education ==
West Central is served by Spokane Public Schools and home to one school: Holmes Elementary. Holmes serves the entire West Central neighborhood. It feeds into Yasuhara Middle School in the Logan neighborhood. From there it feeds into North Central High School in the neighboring Emerson/Garfield neighborhood.

== Transportation ==
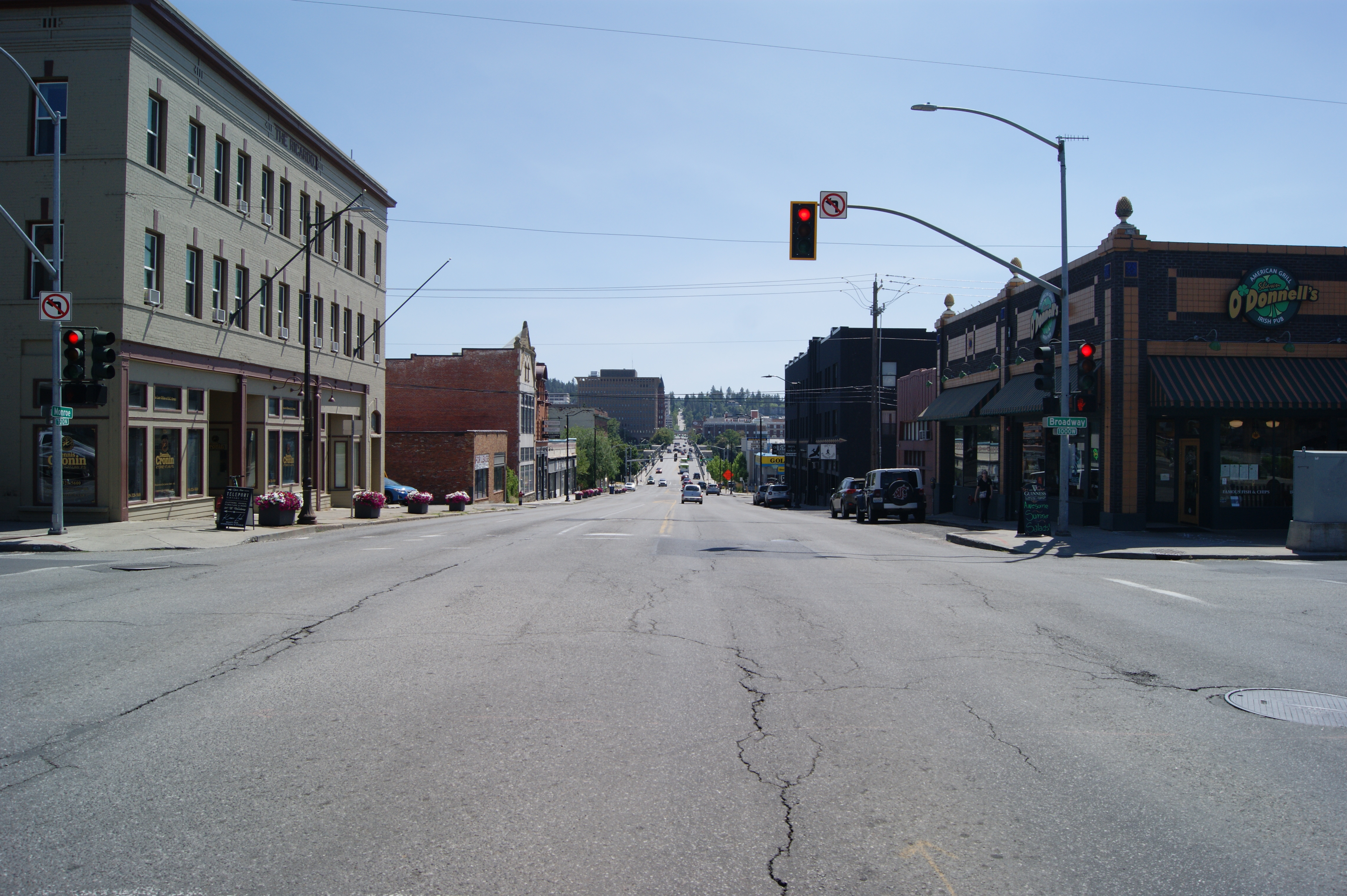
Monroe Street at the edge of the neighborhood looking south toward the Monroe Street Bridge that leads to Downtown Spokane

=== Surface streets ===
West Central is aligned with the city's street grid plan. Monroe Street, the Maple/Ash couplet, and Maxwell Avenue are classified by the city as principal arterials, the highest classification for a surface street. East of the Maple/Ash couplet, Boone and Broadway Avenues are classified as minor arterials, while west of Maple/Ash they are classified as major collectors; Indiana Avenue is also classified as a major collector. In Kendall Yards, Summit Parkway is considered a minor collector from Monroe to Cedar Street; Cedar is then considered a minor collector from Summit north to Broadway. Summit Boulevard, running along the crest of the Spokane River Gorge, is a minor collector from Broadway in the south to Mission Avenue and Pettit Drive in the north, as is Belt Street from Maxwell to Boone. The rest of the streets are considered to be local access roads.

For cyclists, a shared use path for non-motorized vehicles runs along the Centennial Trail, paralleling Summit Parkway and Summit Boulevard around the southern, western and northern edge of West Central. A dedicated bike lane runs along Maxwell Avenue.

=== Public transit ===
The Spokane Transit Authority, the region's public transportation provider, serves West Central with five fixed route bus lines.

Route	Termini			Service operation and notes	Streets traveled
4; Monroe	Downtown Spokane; STA Plaza	↔	Balboa/South Indian Trail; Five Mile Park and Ride	High-frequency route	Monroe
21; West Broadway	Downtown Spokane; STA Plaza	↔	West Central; West Central Community Center	High-frequency route	Monroe, Broadway, A, Summit, Pettet, Nora, Belt, Augusta
22; Northwest Boulevard	Downtown Spokane; STA Plaza	↔	Balboa/South Indian Trail; Five Mile Park & Ride	Basic-frequency route	Monroe, Boone, Maple/Ash couplet
23; Maple/Ash	Downtown Spokane; STA Plaza	↔	North Indian Trail	Basic-frequency route	Monroe, Boone, Maple/Ash couplet
124; North Express	Downtown Spokane; STA Plaza	↔	Fairwood; Hastings Park & Ride	Express route during peak weekday hours; one stop in West Central	Monroe
