= Stockgrowers State Bank =

- U.S. National Register of Historic Places
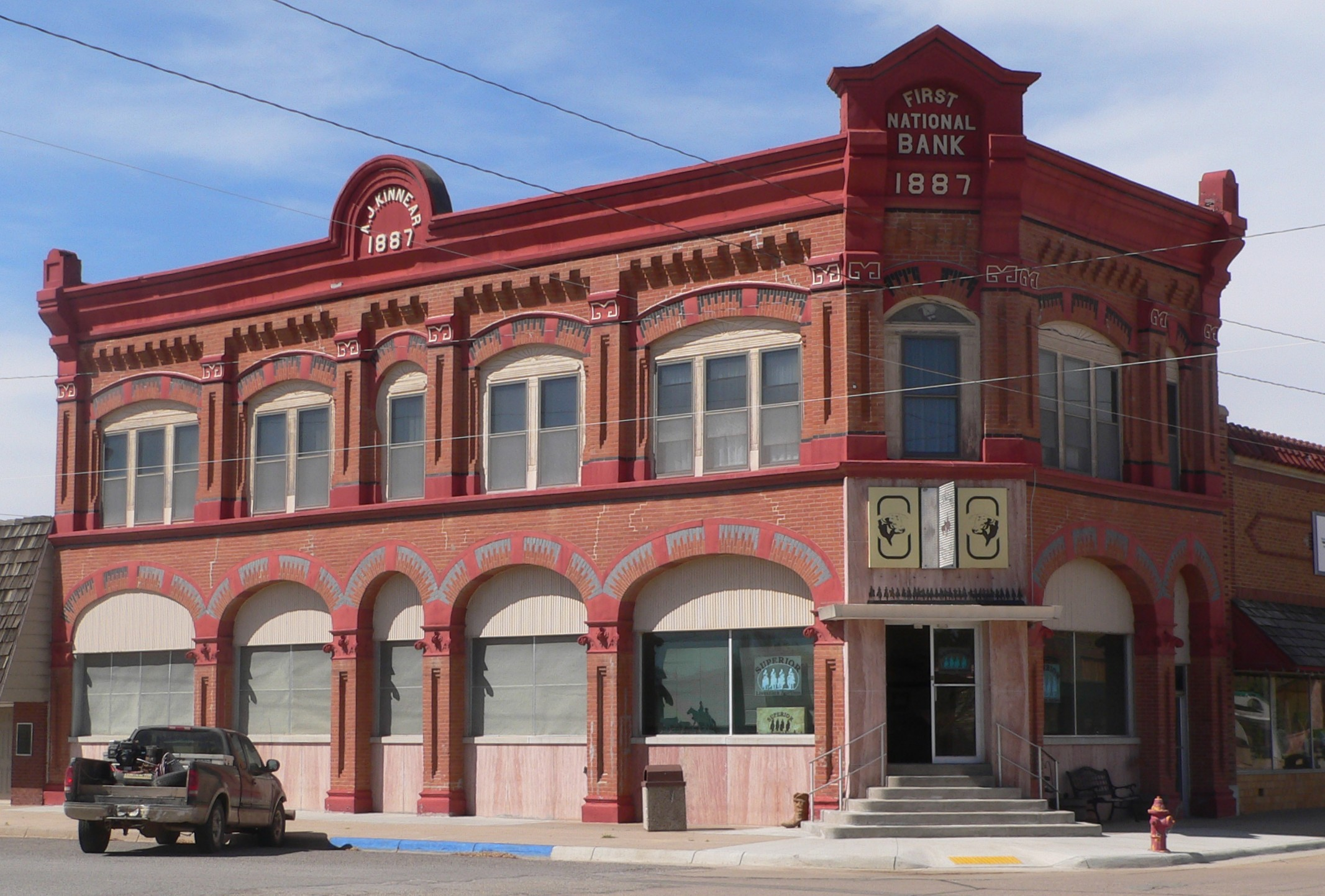
- The Stockgrowers State Bank in 2016

- Location within Kansas Location within the United States
- Location: 8th and Main Sts., Ashland, Kansas
- Coordinates: 37°11′19″N 99°46′10″W
- Area: Less than one acre
- Built: 1887
- Architect: Willis Ritchie
- Architectural style: Romanesque
- NRHP reference No.: 72000490
- Added to NRHP: April 26, 1972

The Stockgrowers State Bank, located at 8th and Main Sts. in Ashland, Kansas, was built in 1887. It has also been known as First National Bank, for whom the building was first built, and which operated for about a year. It was listed on the National Register of Historic Places in 1972.

It is a two-story Romanesque Revival building which is about 70 by 30 feet (21.3 m × 9.1 m) in plan.
