= Doyle's Ice Cream Parlor =

- U.S. Historic district – Contributing property
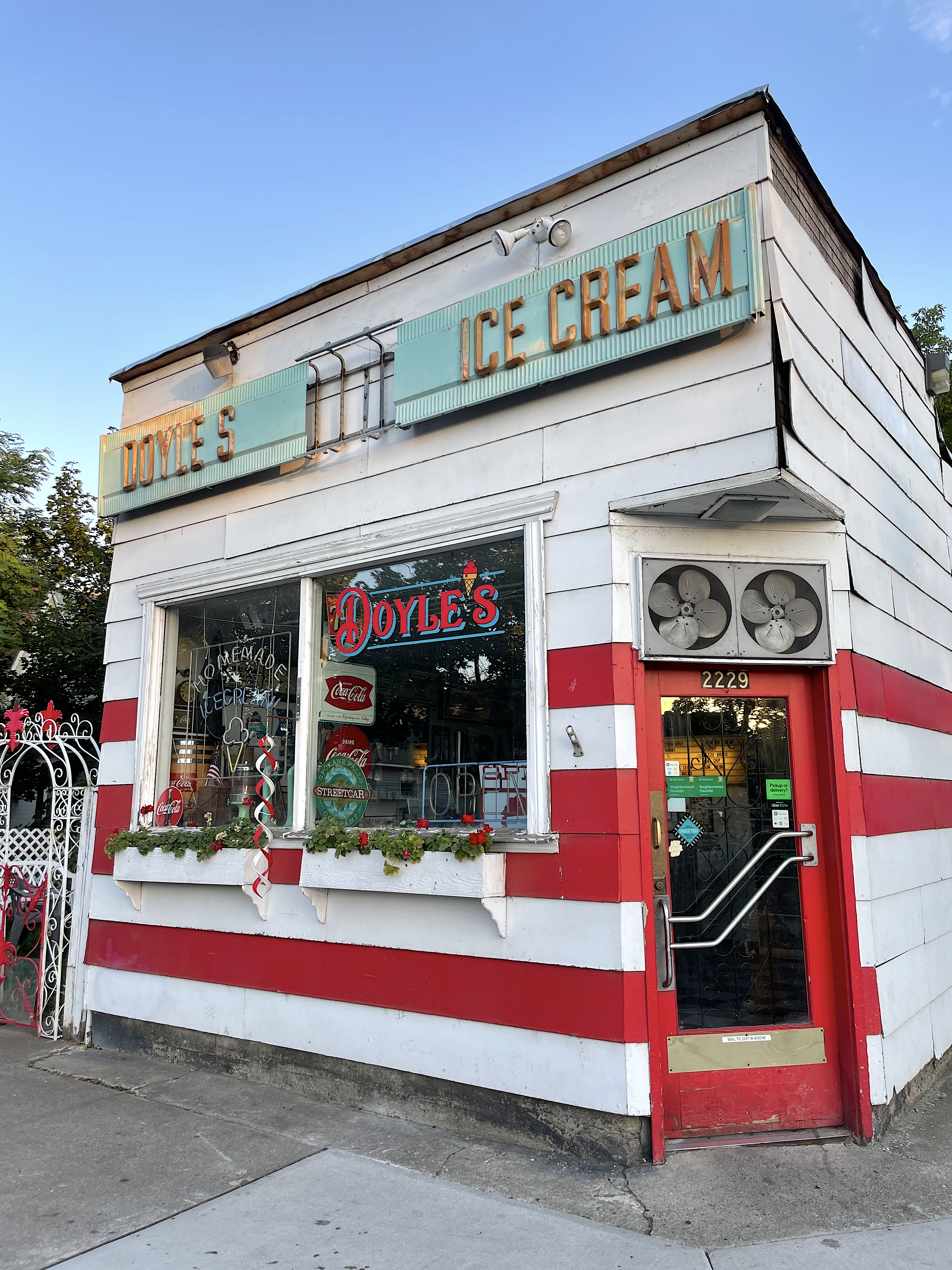
- Interactive map of Doyle's Ice Cream Parlor
- Location: 2229 W. Boone Ave, Spokane, Washington, U.S.
- Coordinates: 47.6679°N 117.4455°W
- Built: 1939
- Part of: Nettleton's Addition Historic District (ID06000176)
- Designated CP: March 22, 2006

Doyle's Ice Cream Parlor is a locally owned ice cream shop that has been in Spokane, Washington's West Central neighborhood since 1939.

== Description ==
Doyle's Ice Cream Parlor is a small ice cream shop located at the intersection of Boone Avenue and Nettleton Street in Spokane's West Central neighborhood. It has been in operation since 1939 and is listed as a contributing property to the Nettleton's Addition Historic District, a Historic district in the United States on the National Register of Historic Places. Doyle's ice cream and waffle cones are homemade. The menu also includes a vintage soda fountain and treats like banana splits, floats and milkshakes.

The building is painted with red and white stripes on the exterior, with two plate glass windows the Boone Avenue face. The door is located on the corner, facing the intersection of Boone and Nettleton Street. It was built in 1928 with the intention of serving as a commercial structure. The interior is decorated with a large collection of vintage toys. It is designed like an old ice cream shop, with a checkered tile floor and a bar-like counter seating with high stools.

== History ==
Doyle's Ice Cream Parlor was established at its current location in 1939, though the building was constructed in 1928. The building at 2229 W. Boone Ave. was built to house a bakery owned by Charles Cota. By 1930 it housed M.J. Leamy's Barber Shop, and in 1935 the listed owner was R.H. Overholser, a barber who operated a barber shop out of the building while also living in the small structure. Doyle's Ice Cream Parlor took over the space in 1939 and Arthur Doyle subsequently purchased the property from the estate of builder Charles Cota in 1940. In its early years, a streetcar line ran along Boone Avenue to its terminus at Natatorium Park, a popular amusement park along the Spokane River to the west. Arthur Doyle operated the business until 1972. The business was purchased in 1991 by Jerry Gill, who grew up two houses down from the parlor. Gill maintained the nostalgic feel of Doyle's. The business was closed for a few years in the mid-1990s as the owners dealt with health issues in their family. Reopening took longer than planned as the ice cream shop had been using the original equipment, much of which needed to be repaired. "I make the ice cream right there at the shop, using the original equipment from the early ’40s. The machines are built like tanks, so that’s good, but on the other hand if something breaks you can’t buy parts anymore; you have to make the part," Gill told The Spokesman-Review upon reopening in 2010. After owning the business for three decades, Gill passed ownership of Doyle's Ice Cream Parlor to his nephew.

== Reception ==
Doyle's is regularly named among the city's best ice cream shops, and has won awards. In 2020 it was named "Best Place to Wait for a Shake" by the Inlander, and one of eight places to go on National Ice Cream Day by The Spokesman-Review.
