= B. F. Langworthy =

American politician (1822–1907)

Member of the Minnesota House of Representatives from the 13th district
- In office December 7, 1859 – January 7, 1861

Personal details
- Born: Benjamin Franklin Langworthy; January 20, 1822 Mansfield, Ohio, U.S.
- Died: January 23, 1907 (aged 85) Brownsdale, Minnesota, U.S.
- Resting place: Tanner Cemetery
- Party: Republican
- Spouse: Sarah Melissa Clemans (m. 1849)
- Children: 2
- Occupation: Politician, farmer

Benjamin Franklin Langworthy (January 20, 1822 – January 23, 1907) was an American politician in the U.S. state of Minnesota.

== Biography ==
Langworthy was born Benjamin Franklin Langworthy on January 20, 1822, to Cyrus and Charlotte Langworthy in Mansfield, Ohio. Eventually he would move to Oshkosh, Wisconsin, and Mower County, Minnesota. His father served in the Ohio House of Representatives. Two first cousins, Lucius Hart Langworthy and Edward Langworthy, would become involved in politics in Iowa. He died on January 23, 1907, in Brownsdale, Minnesota.

== Career ==
Langworthy served in the Minnesota State House of Representatives from 1859 to 1860.
