= Cowley County National Bank Building =

- U.S. National Register of Historic Places
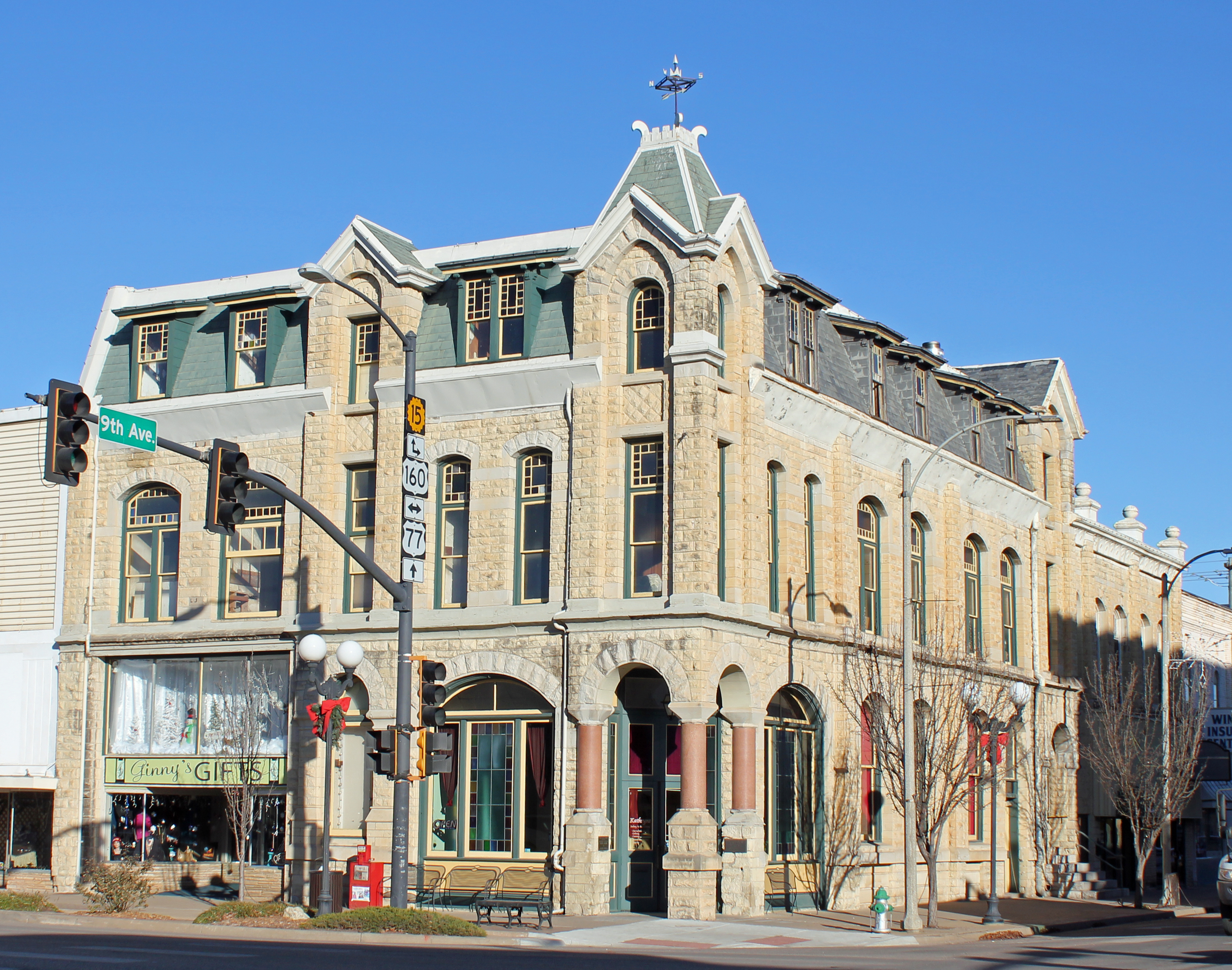

- Location within Kansas Location within the United States
- Location: 820-822 Main St., Winfield, Kansas
- Coordinates: 37°14′25″N 96°59′47″W
- Area: less than one acre
- Built: 1886
- Architect: Richie Brothers
- Architectural style: Second Empire
- NRHP reference No.: 83000421 (original); 100006617 (increase)

Significant dates
- Added to NRHP: August 11, 1983
- Boundary increase: June 3, 2021

The Cowley County National Bank Building, located at 820-822 Main St. in Winfield, Kansas, was built in 1886. It was listed on the National Register of Historic Places in 1983.

It is a two-and-a-half-story limestone building. It was designed by the Richie Brothers.

It was completed in 1886 and first occupied as the Farmers' Bank. From 1891 until 1922, it was operated at the Cowley County National Bank. The building was designed in the style of Second Empire architecture by local architects by W.A. Ritchie and W.J. Ritchie.
