= Clark County Courthouse (Washington) =

Courthouse for Clark County in Vancouver, Washington, U.S.

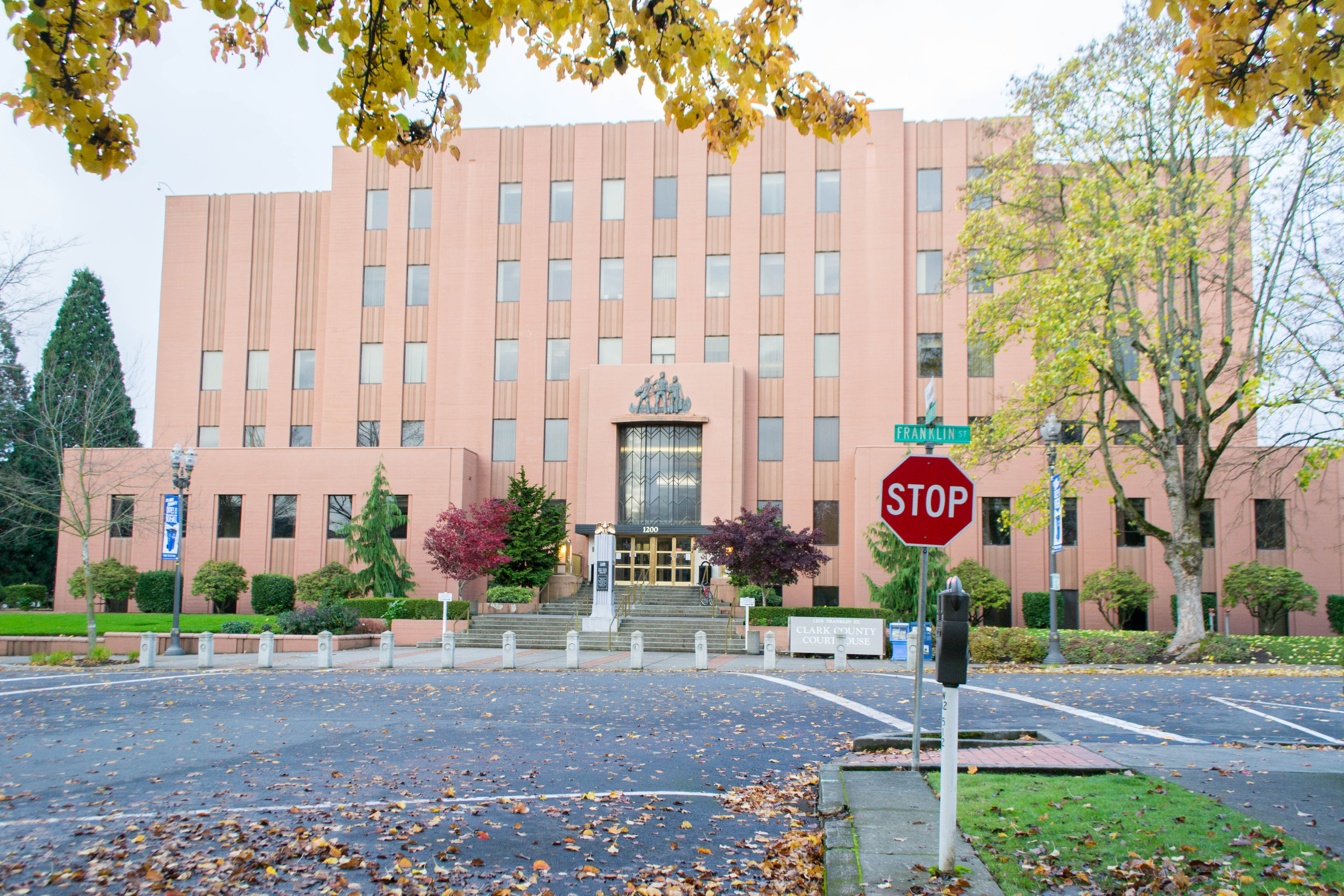
- The building's exterior in 2013
- Interactive map of the Clark County Courthouse area

General information
- Status: Completed
- Type: Courthouse
- Architectural style: Art Deco/Art Moderne
- Location: Vancouver, Washington, U.S.
- Coordinates: 45.6304°N 122.6776°W
- Current tenants: Clark County
- Inaugurated: November 29, 1941

Technical details
- Floor count: 5
- Clark County Courthouse
- U.S. National Register of Historic Places
- Location: Vancouver, Washington, U.S.
- Built: 1941
- Architect: Day Walter Hilborn
- NRHP reference No.: 14000165
- Added to NRHP: April 11, 2014

The Clark County Courthouse is a historic office building in Vancouver, Washington, United States, that houses the judicial courts and other facilities for Clark County. The five-story concrete building was designed by Day Walter Hilborn in the Art Deco and Art Moderne styles and constructed at a cost of $546,000. The courthouse was dedicated by Washington governor Arthur B. Langlie on November 29, 1941, with thousands attending the open house.

The courthouse is the fourth to be used by Clark County and was built at the site of the previous courthouse, which was built in 1892. The building includes terrazzo-style floors and ornamental fittings; a bas-relief sculpture above the front entrance was damaged during a power-washing operation in 1978. The Clark County Courthouse was listed on the National Register of Historic Places in 2014.

== See also ==
- List of county courthouses in Washington (state)
- National Register of Historic Places listings in Clark County, Washington
