= Gustav Meese Building =

- Meese, Gustav, Building
- U.S. National Register of Historic Places
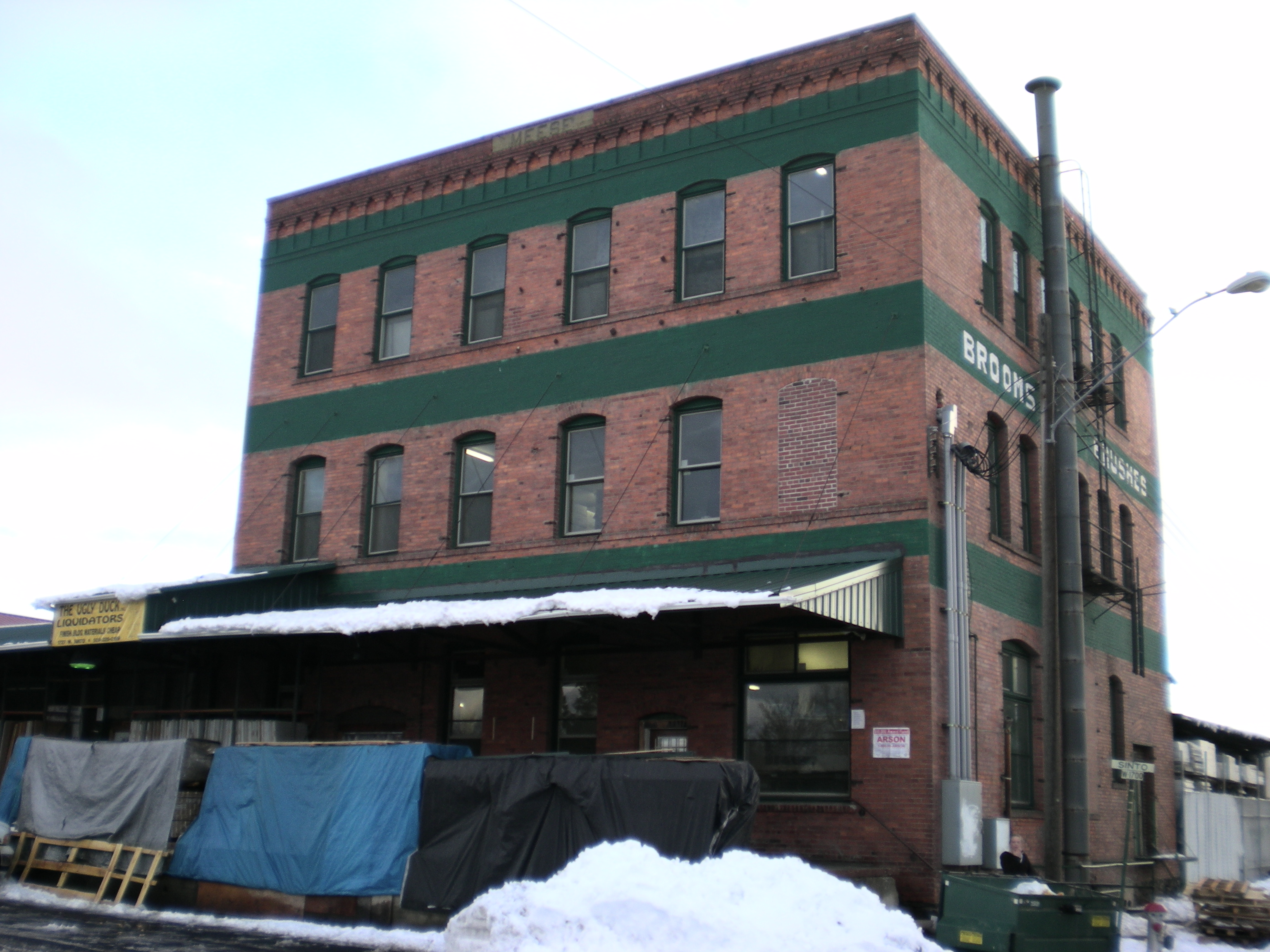
- The building in 2008

- Location within Washington (state) Location within the United States
- Location: 1727 Sinto Avenue, Spokane, Washington
- Coordinates: 47°40′11″N 117°26′13″W
- Area: less than one acre
- Built: 1904
- NRHP reference No.: 96000049
- Added to NRHP: February 16, 1996

The Gustav Meese Building is a historic building in West Central, Spokane, Washington. It was built in late 1904 for Gustav Meese & Company's Washington Broom Factory, to replace a previous wooden building destroyed in a fire. Meese was a businessman from San Francisco; he owned the building until his death in 1934. It has been listed on the National Register of Historic Places since February 16, 1996.

It was deemed "significant due to its architectural stature as an industrial property type of good integrity representing the West Central neighborhood, its association with commercial development in the area, and its connection to persons important to the commercial development of Spokane. The Washington Broom Factory is the oldest industrial building in the area and retains a higher level of integrity than most nearby buildings of historic vintage."
