= Spokane Fire Station No. 3 =

- U.S. National Register of Historic Places
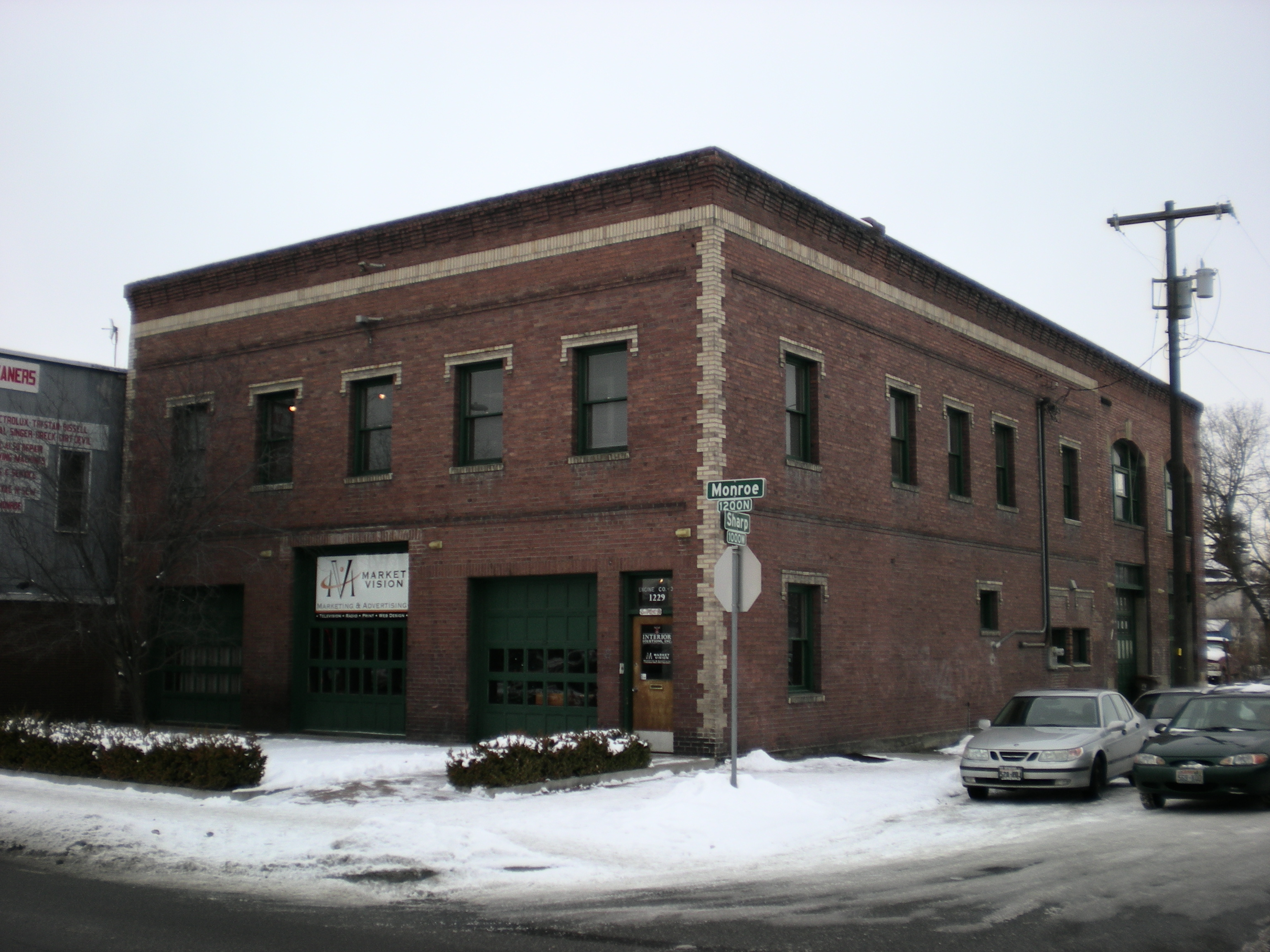

- Location within Spokane riverfront area
- Location: 1229 N. Monroe St., Spokane, Washington
- Coordinates: 47°40′08″N 117°25′38″W
- Area: less than one acre
- Built: 1912, 1917
- Built by: City of Spokane
- Architectural style: Early Commercial
- NRHP reference No.: 94001439
- Added to NRHP: December 9, 1994

The Spokane Fire Station No. 3, at 1229 N. Monroe St. in West Central, Spokane, Washington, was built in 1912–1917. It was listed on the National Register of Historic Places in 1994.

The original Fire Station No. 3 was built in 1889 at the corner of Broadway and Madison. A new wood-frame Fire Station No. 3 was built at the present location in 1894. The current building's rear (west) part was built in 1912, behind the 1894 structure. The front part was rebuilt as a brick building around 1917.
