= Jefferson County Courthouse (Washington) =

- U.S. National Register of Historic Places
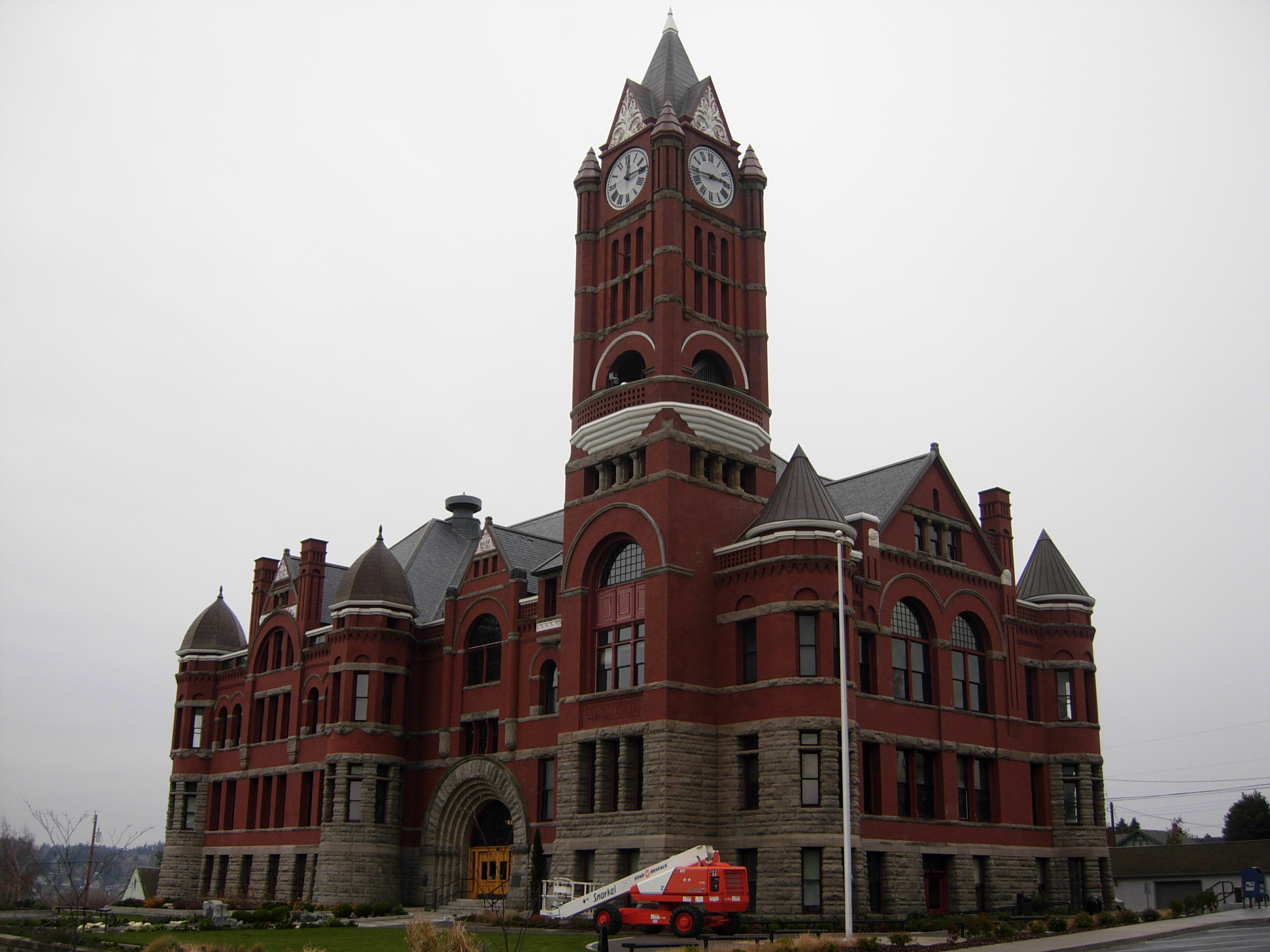

- Location within Washington (state) Location within the United States
- Interactive map showing the location of Jefferson County Courthouse
- Location: Jefferson and Case Sts., Port Townsend, Washington
- Coordinates: 48°6′44″N 122°45′59″W
- Area: 1.5 acres (0.61 ha)
- Built: 1892
- Built by: Rigby, John
- Architect: W.A. Ritchie
- Architectural style: Romanesque
- NRHP reference No.: 73001871
- Added to NRHP: April 24, 1973

The Jefferson County Courthouse in Port Townsend, Washington was built in 1892. It was listed on the National Register of Historic Places in 1973. It was designed by architect W.A. Ritchie and is Romanesque Revival in style.

It has a 143 feet (44 m) tall tower.
