= Spokane County Courthouse =

- U.S. National Register of Historic Places
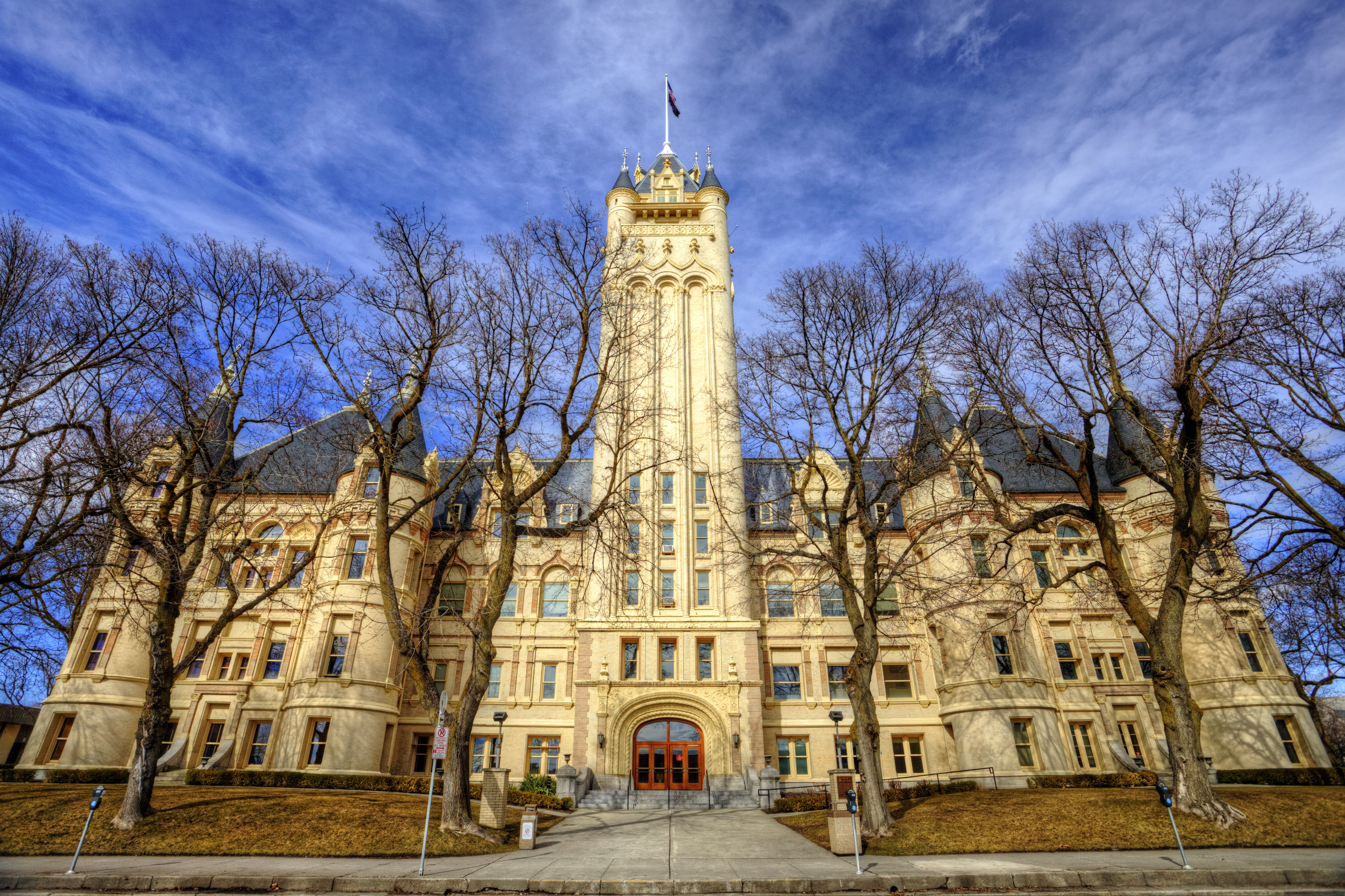

- Location within Spokane riverfront area
- Location: 1116 W. Broadway, Spokane, Washington
- Coordinates: 47°39′53″N 117°25′43″W
- Built: 1894–1895
- Built by: David B. Fotheringham
- Architect: Willis Ritchie
- Architectural style: French Renaissance
- NRHP reference No.: 74001980
- Added to NRHP: January 21, 1974

The Spokane County Courthouse is a government building home to numerous Spokane County offices such as those of the assessor, auditor and clerk, as well as courtrooms for the Spokane County Superior Court.

The courthouse was built in 1895 in the French Renaissance revival and Châteauesque styles, and added to the National Register of Historic Places in 1974. A design contest prior to construction was won by architect Willis Ritchie. It is located in the city center, just north of the Spokane River from Downtown Spokane, in the West Central neighborhood. The courthouse is situated front and center on a nine square block campus that includes most of the county's offices as well as the Spokane Police Department headquarters. The nearly nine story central tower rises well above the surrounding buildings on the north bank of the river, and has helped make the courthouse a landmark in Spokane since its construction.

== History ==
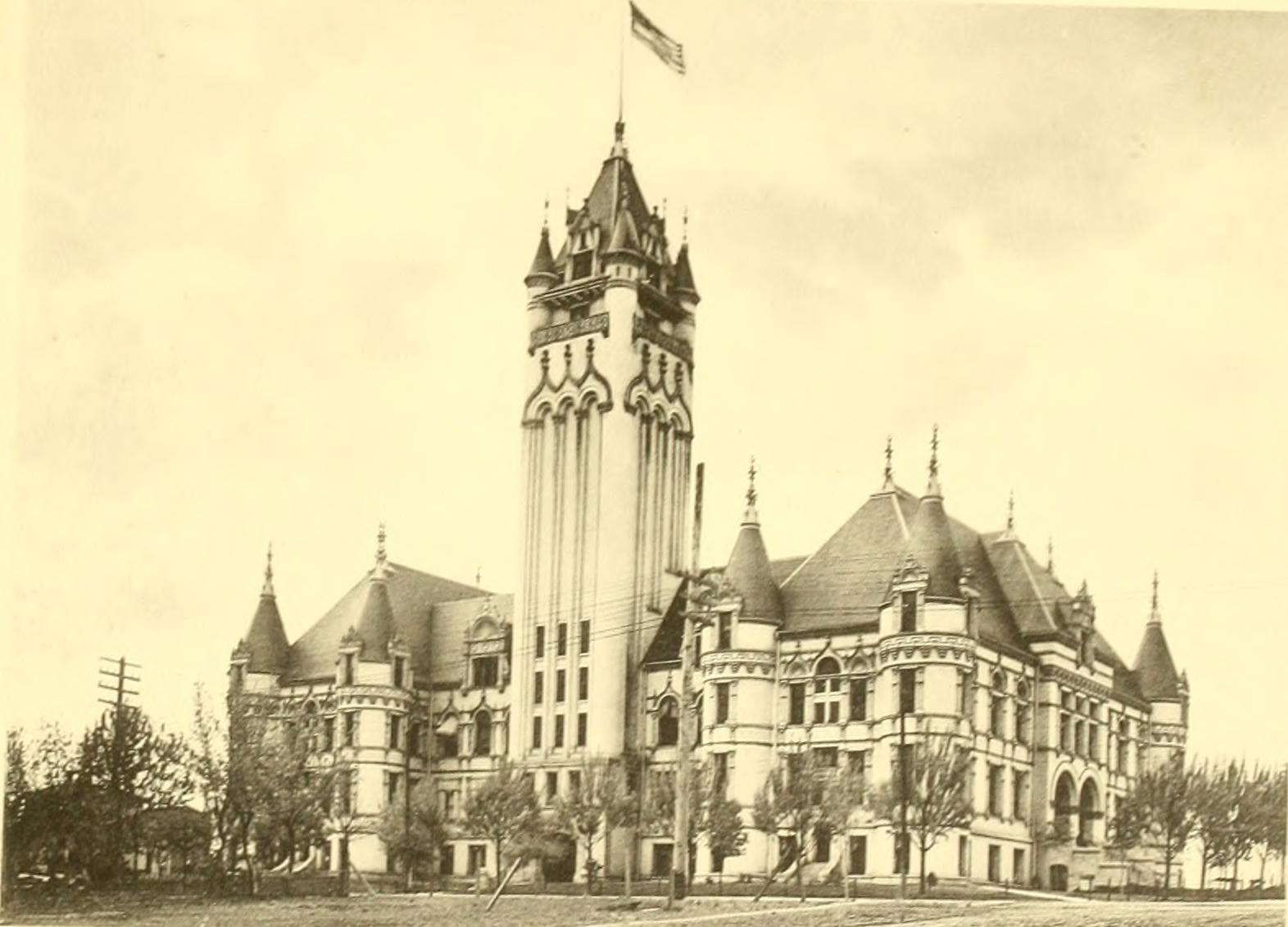
The courthouse ca. 1890s

Ground was broken on the site in 1893, on land donated nearly a decade earlier by settler David P. Jenkins, and the courthouse project was envisioned to be a way to help the then nascent city of Spokane recover from the Panic of 1893 financial downturn. The location chosen was controversial, but also a compromise. Spokane's business community hoped to locate the courthouse in the central business district of the city, which was located on the south side of the river. Rural communities in Spokane County advocated for a more rural location, and even threatened to secede and form a new county if a satisfactory site was not chosen. At the time, the north bank of the Spokane River was largely undeveloped, which appeased the rural communities, but also well-connected to the business district just across the river.

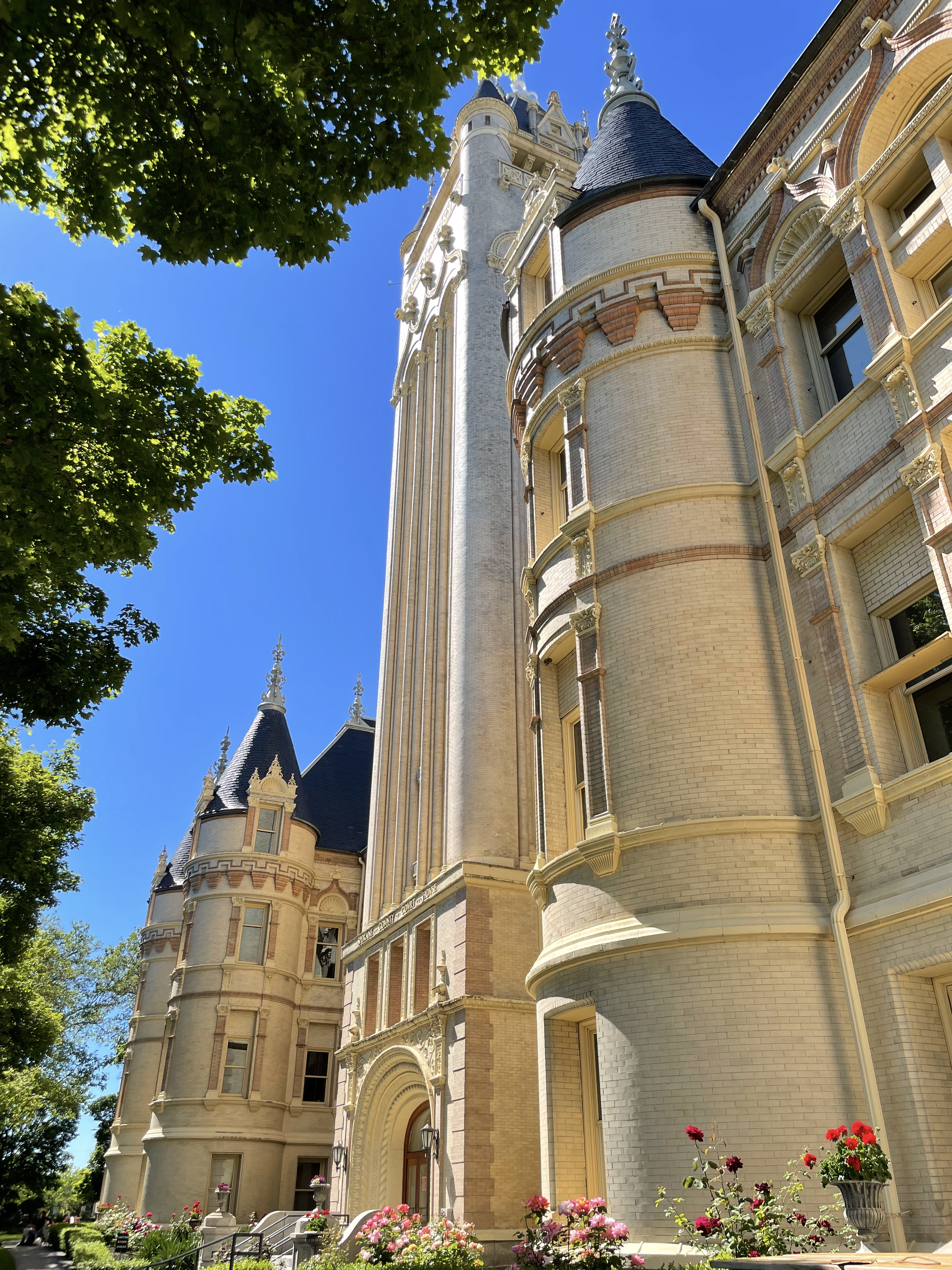
South face from the courthouse lawn

Also in 1893 the Board of County Commissioners for Spokane County held a design contest, soliciting plans for a fire-proof masonry building that could be constructed for no more than $250,000. Twenty-nine-year-old architect Willis A. Ritchie's submission was selected, and Ritchie was awarded 5% of the cost of construction. A design from prolific Spokane architect Kirtland Cutter took second place, netting Cutter a not-insignificant $500 runner-up prize.

Construction began on Ritchie's design in the spring of 1894 under the leadership of contractor David B. Fotheringham. The building was completed by November 1895, but the construction process was not entirely lacking in delays or controversies. Prior to construction, the plan was criticized for being too expensive and extravagant to build during an economic depression. In March 1895, construction was brought to a halt due to a disagreement between Richie and the superintendent of construction. Ritchie was asked to resign by the Board of County Commissioners as charges of fraud and swindling were leveled against him, but Ritchie refused. The charges were the subject of a grand jury investigation, which found, "we have sifted these charges thoroughly, find them untrue, malicious and wicked, having been made by parties who must have known differently, and made for the purpose of misleading the people generally, and this surely and particular. Hard times, prejudice and disappointment must have been at the root of the matter. We find the courthouse to be one of the most substantial and well-built offices in this or any other state, and built in accordance with the plans and specifications, excepting changes that were duly authorized. We find no evidence of boodle or corruption and we believe there has been none." Construction resumed, and on November 20, 1895, the building opened and officials moved in.

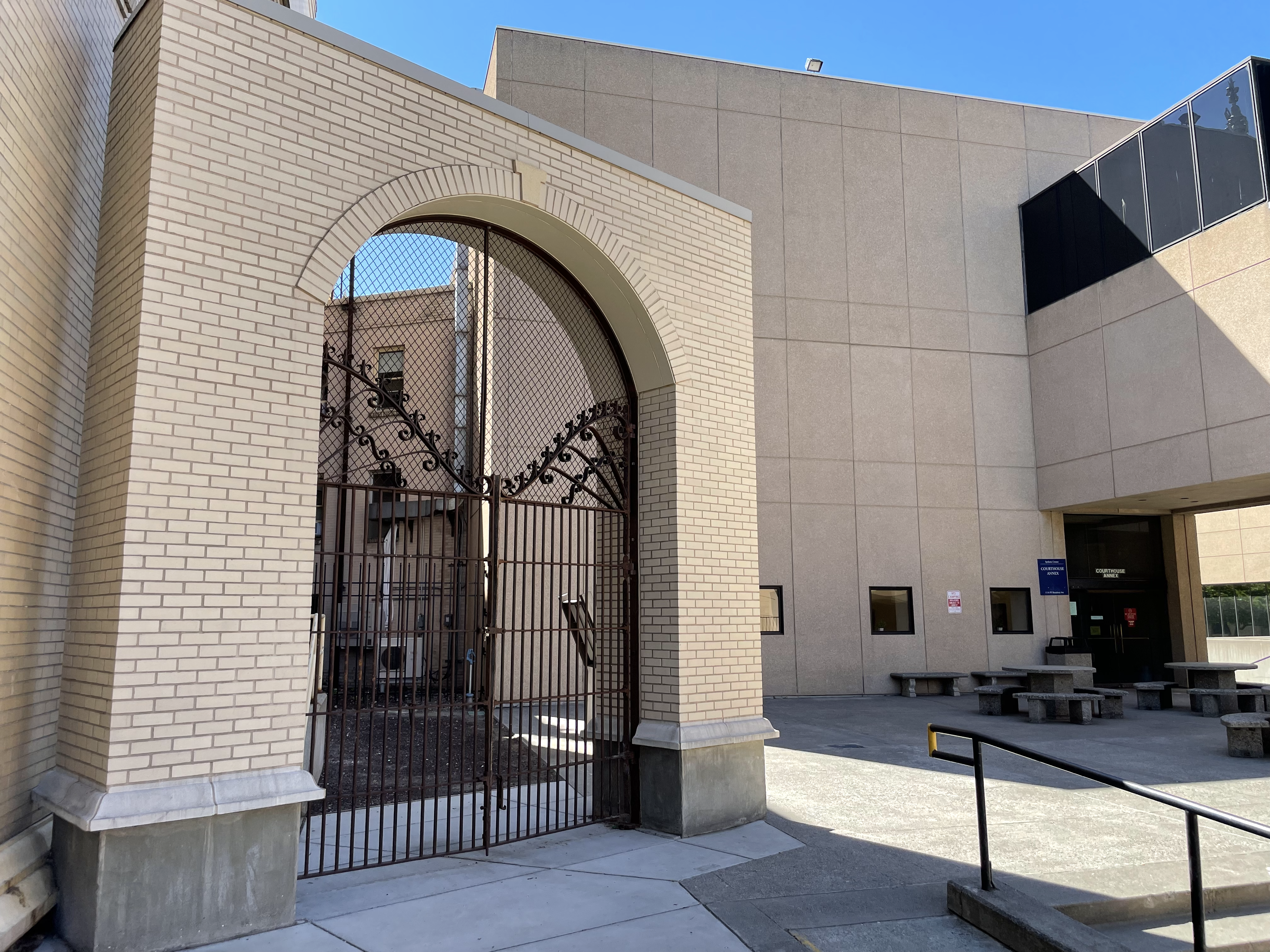
Original 1895 iron gate from the jail yard, restored in 2017

In its early years the courthouse was the site of multiple hangings and a homicide. In 1896, attorney Lou H. Plattor was shot on the building's second floor by Henry Siefert, who claimed to be acting in self-defense. Seifert was charged with murder, but later acquitted. One notable hanging was that of George Webster on March 30, 1900. Webster was charged with first-degree murder, but had significant public support for his clemency, with a petition garnering more than 6,000 signatures, though it would not be granted. Webster was the first white man, though far from the first person, to be hung at the courthouse. He was also the last before the state moved all executions to the state penitentiary in Walla Walla.

To keep up with growth in the county, an expansion of the courthouse campus was undertaken in 1953 when the public health building immediately north of the courthouse was destroyed and replaced by a four-story courthouse annex building. The main building underwent a significant renovation project in 2006. Structural work was done on bricks, balconies and the roof, while restoration work was done on the decorative elements. The entire original slate roof was also replaced, which required surrounding the building in scaffolding as the more than 100 year old roof could not be touched. The project cost approximately $2 million and was intended to last for 100 years.

== Architecture ==
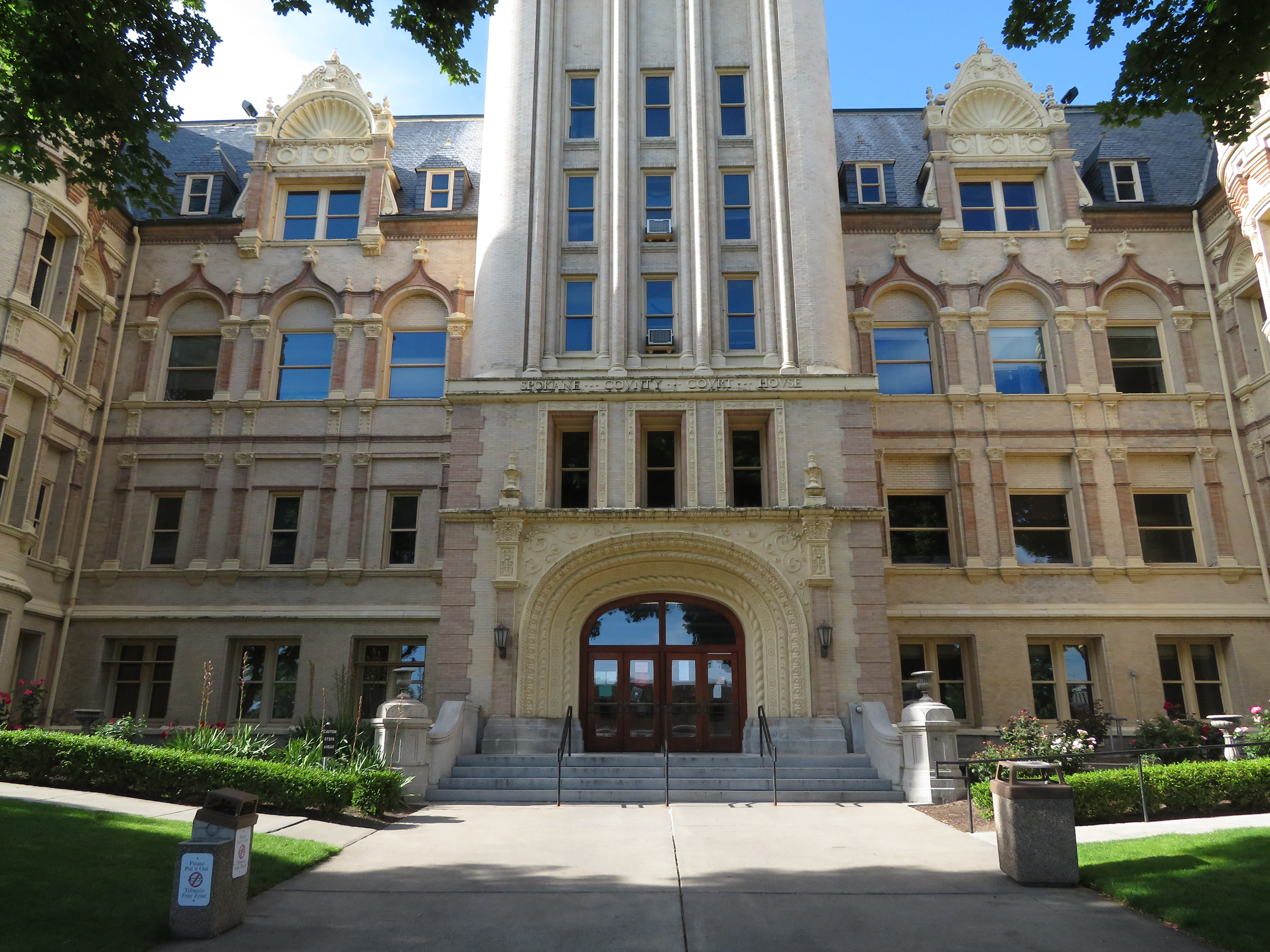
The main entrance façade

Willis Ritchie's design of the structure displays aspects of the French Renaissance and Romanesque Revival styles. The building has drawn comparisons to the Château d'Azay-le-Rideau and the Château de Chambord in the Loire Valley of France. The central tower, however, does not have an antecedent in the French Renaissance style. It has instead drawn comparisons to the Romanesque Revival Allegheny County Courthouse in Pittsburgh. The decorative aspects of the building's facade include cornices, entablatures, festoons and pilasters of the Composite order.

The building is a masonry structure that is load-bearing with dry-pressed bricks. It was one of the first buildings in Spokane to be built with locally manufactured bricks, from the Washington Brick and Lime Company, rather than ones shipped in from the east. The H-shaped building has conical towers on the corners of each arm. These, along with the high center tower with its long pilasters, help emphasize verticality on the otherwise bulky structure.

A steep, Mansard-style slate roof tops the main, bulky, H-shaped structure, as well as the central and corner towers. The corner towers are topped with spires while the central tower has a flagpole.
