= William Nettleton =

American politician (1822–1905)

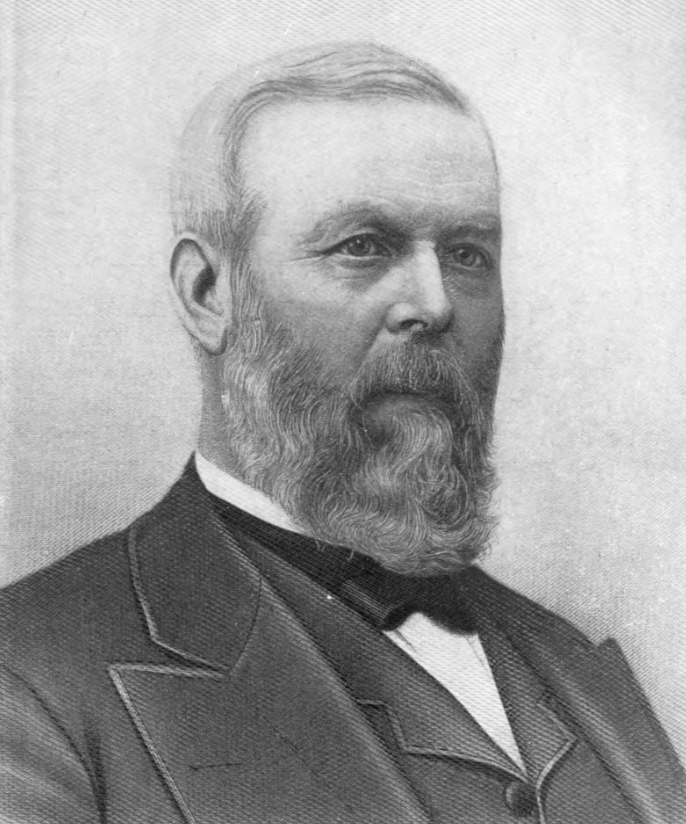

Member of the Minnesota House of Representatives from the 26th district
- In office December 8, 1859 – January 7, 1861
- Preceded by: John S. Watrous
- Succeeded by: District abolished

Personal details
- Born: April 22, 1822 Ashtabula, Ohio, US
- Died: January 20, 1905 (aged 82) Spokane, Washington, US
- Party: Minnesota Democratic Party
- Spouse: Helen M. "Nell" Scoville (m. 1860)
- Children: 3
- Occupation: Merchant; Surveyor; Farmer

William Nettleton (April 22, 1822 – January 20, 1905) was a 19th-century American pioneer and Minnesota politician, who has often been considered a founder of Duluth. A Democrat, he represented the Arrowhead Region in the Minnesota House of Representatives during the 2nd Minnesota Legislature.

== Biography ==
Nettleton grew up in Ashtabula County, Ohio, where he continued to work on his parents' farm until he was in his late 20s. Upon leaving his parents' farm, Nettleton joined his brother, George E. Nettleton, working as an Indian trader at the Chippewa Agency at Sand Lake, Wisconsin. By around 1853–54, Nettleton had made several professional connections which brought him into association with the Superior Townsite Company. In 1854, he selected and, with the aid of others under the company's employ, surveyed the townsite for what would eventually become the city of Superior. That winter, William was joined in Superior by George, who proceeded to establish a grocery store on Minnesota Point.

In 1856, the Nettleton brothers, together with Orin W. Rice, Robert E. Jefferson, and future-Mayor Joshua B. Culver, surveyed the townsite of Duluth, for which service the Nettletons acquired hundreds of acres of land in the Duluth area. While George, who continued to reside in Superior, partnered with Culver to establish a sawmill, William became the proprietor of a trading store and established a farmstead on the Minnesota side of Superior Bay.

Nettleton soon took a keen interest in the development of the Duluth-Superior area—particularly by way of promoting the establishment of transportation links. "It is said" noted an article published in the St. Paul Globe at the time of his death, "he gave to all railroads land where they now have their terminals and was largely instrumental in the upbuilding of both these cities." The same article particularly credited him for being an early proponent of a railroad link between the Twin Cities and the Twin Ports, which would eventually come into being when Jay Cooke financed the construction of the Lake Superior and Mississippi Railroad from 1863 to its completion in 1870.

As Minnesota began to transition toward statehood, Nettleton became more involved in the political life of the fledgling Duluth community. In 1856, he was elected a probate judge. In 1857 and 1858, he was elected to the Duluth town board, and served as its president. Finally, on October 11, 1859, he was elected to succeed John S. Watrous in representing the 26th District in the Minnesota House of Representatives. However, from the moment Nettleton was elected to the legislature, his former surveying partner Robert E. Jefferson, who had run against him in the election, contested that Nettleton was not qualified on the basis that, according to Jefferson, Nettleton was a resident of Superior. But, after taking testimony from a number of individuals including Joshua Culver (in whose Duluth home Nettleton had spent many nights), George Nettleton, and Douglas County Sheriff J.D. Ray, among others, the House concluded that Nettleton was indeed a resident of Minnesota, and he kept his seat.

During his tenure in the legislature, Nettleton served on the House Committees on Agriculture and Manufactures, Mines and Minerals, and the State Library, but his pet project continued to be advocacy for the development of transportation infrastructure linking Northern Minnesota with the rest of the state. However, he would not be given much time to accomplish his ends—Nettleton's district was abolished when the legislature decided to reduce the number of its members for the 1861 session, and, given the difficulty of seeking election in a new district which comprised 19 counties, Nettleton did not return to the legislature.

Nettleton also had a major change in his personal life while he was a member of the legislature. In 1860, he married Helen M. "Nell" Scoville, who was, like Nettleton, also a native of Ashtabula, Ohio. Just 18 years old at the time of their marriage, Nell was twenty years her husband's junior; but the pair wasted little time forming a family unit. Their eldest child (and only son), George O. Nettleton, was born in 1861, followed two years later by the Nettletons' eldest daughter, Louise L. Nettleton. The last of their three children, Julia C. Nettleton, was born six years after her elder sister.

The Nettletons continued to live in the Duluth area for another decade following William's departure from the legislature. In 1871, William ran for the office of Mayor of Duluth, losing to the Republican Clinton Markell. After William's defeat in the mayoral election, the Nettleton family moved to Saint Paul, establishing a dairy farm on a 130-acre plot just outside of the contemporary limits of the city. The Nettletons continued farming on the land for eight years. In 1880, Nettleton and his son platted the land as a new addition to the city of Saint Paul, which would ultimately become the neighborhood of Macalester-Groveland.

The family uprooted a final time in 1883, moving to Spokane, Washington. Two years later, they were joined in Spokane by William Ozelle Nettleton, the son of Nettleton's brother Joshua Mills. A year later, Nettleton purchased 270 acres of land from the Northern Pacific Railroad, which he, his son, and his nephew platted as a new addition to the city of Spokane. A working-class neighborhood began to blossom on the land in the late 1890s.

Nettleton died at around midday on January 20, 1905, when, while he was walking across the Spokane River Bridge, he suffered an epileptic seizure which caused him to fall from the bridge. His body was recovered 200 yards downstream.
