= Peter Roy =

1874 portrait of Roy

Peter Roy (February 23, 1828 – June 21, 1881) was an American farmer and politician.

Roy was born in Rainy Lake, in what was then Michigan Territory and was of French and Ojibwe descent. He went to school in La Pointe, Wisconsin, was a farmer, and served an interpreter for the Long Lake Agency. Roy lived in Belle Plaine, Scott County, Minnesota with his wife and family. He served in the Minnesota Territorial House of Representatives in 1854 and in the Minnesota House of Representatives from 1859-1860 and again in 1862; he was a Democrat. Roy died in Little Falls, Minnesota.
