= Willis Ritchie =

American architect (1864–1931)

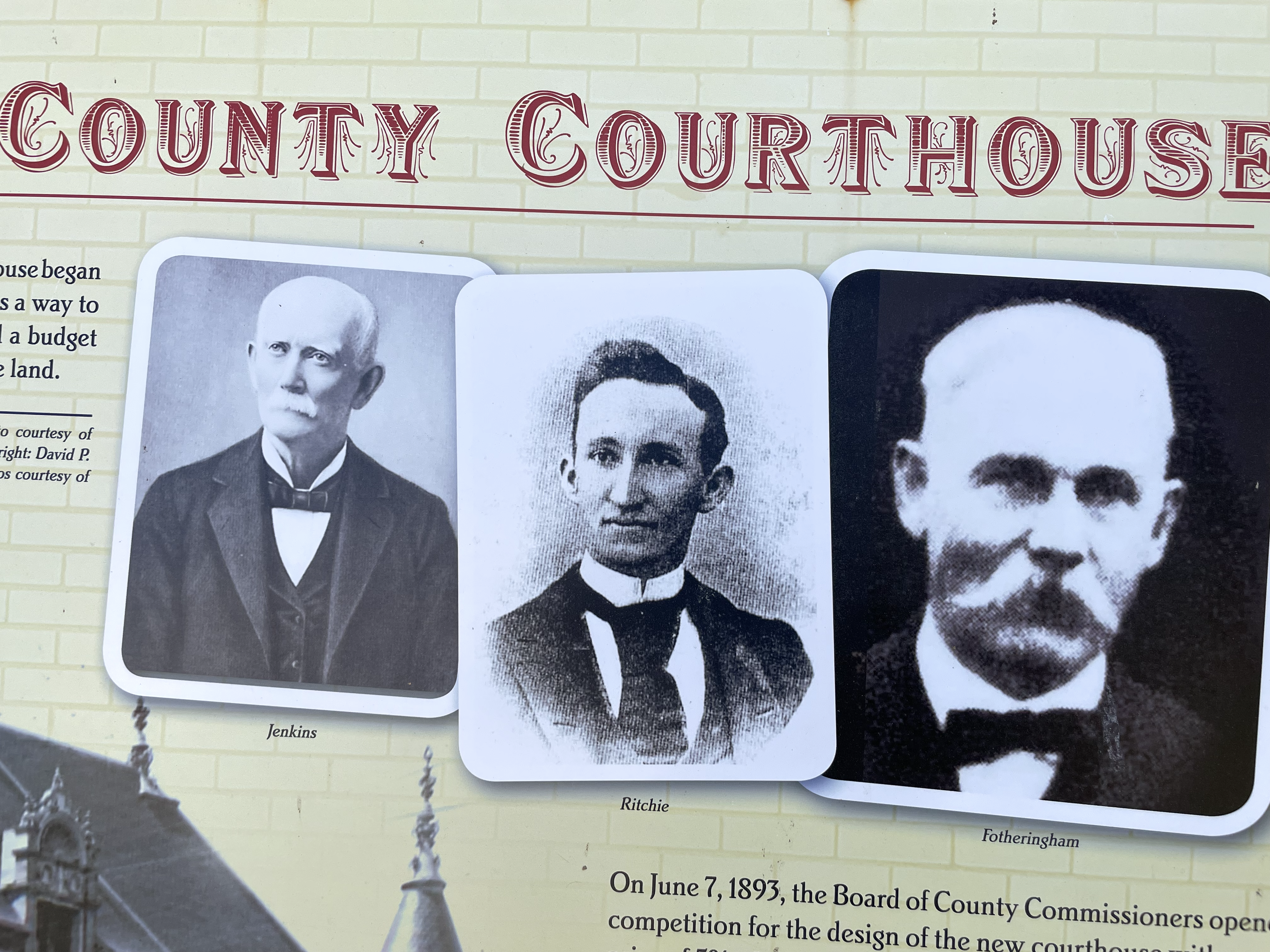
Willis Ritchie (center}

Willis Alexander Ritchie (14 July 1864 – 17 January 1931), also known as W.A.Ritchie, was an architect whose career began in Ohio and Kansas, but reached maturity in Seattle and Spokane, Washington.

Ritchie was born in Van Wert, Ohio, before moving to Lima, Ohio, with his family where he would later begin his own practice. He won numerous competitions for county courthouses and other public buildings in the early 1890s, was the first architect to achieve a statewide reputation in Washington. Among his major commissions is the Jefferson County, Washington courthouse, in Port Townsend, completed in 1890.

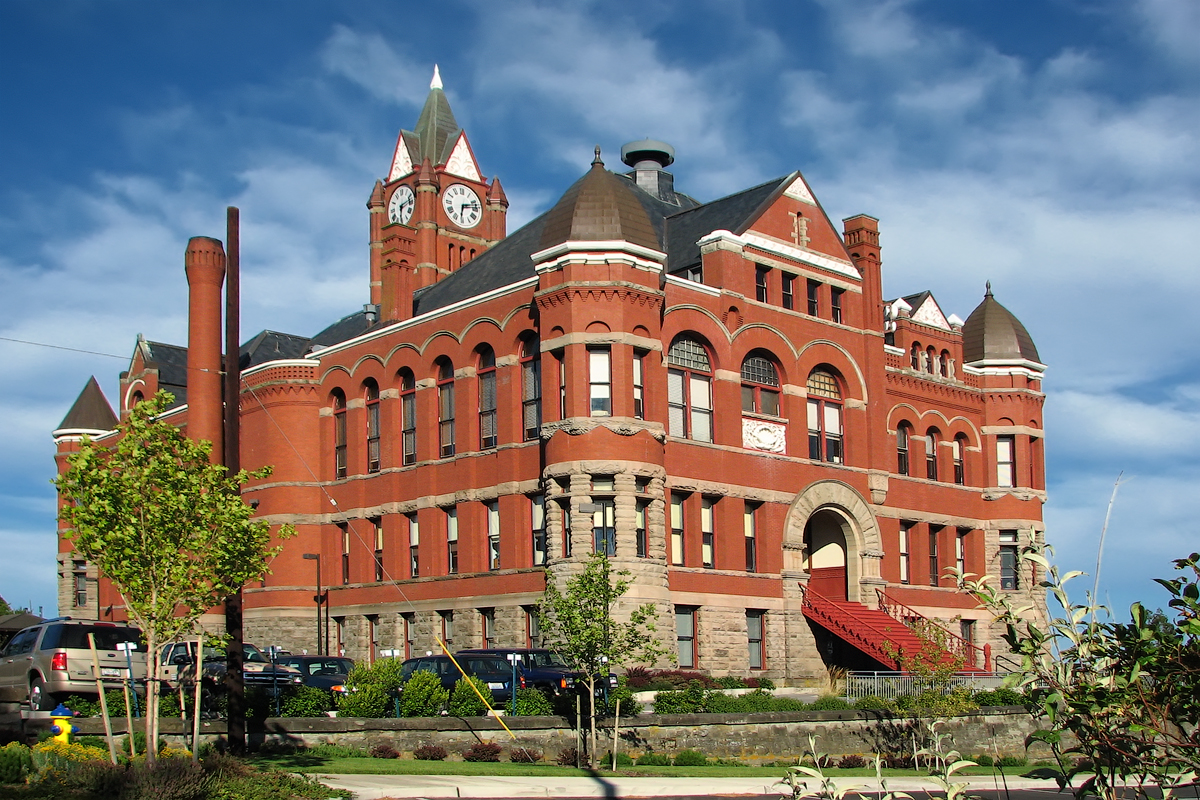
Jefferson County, Washington courthouse, in Port Townsend, 1890

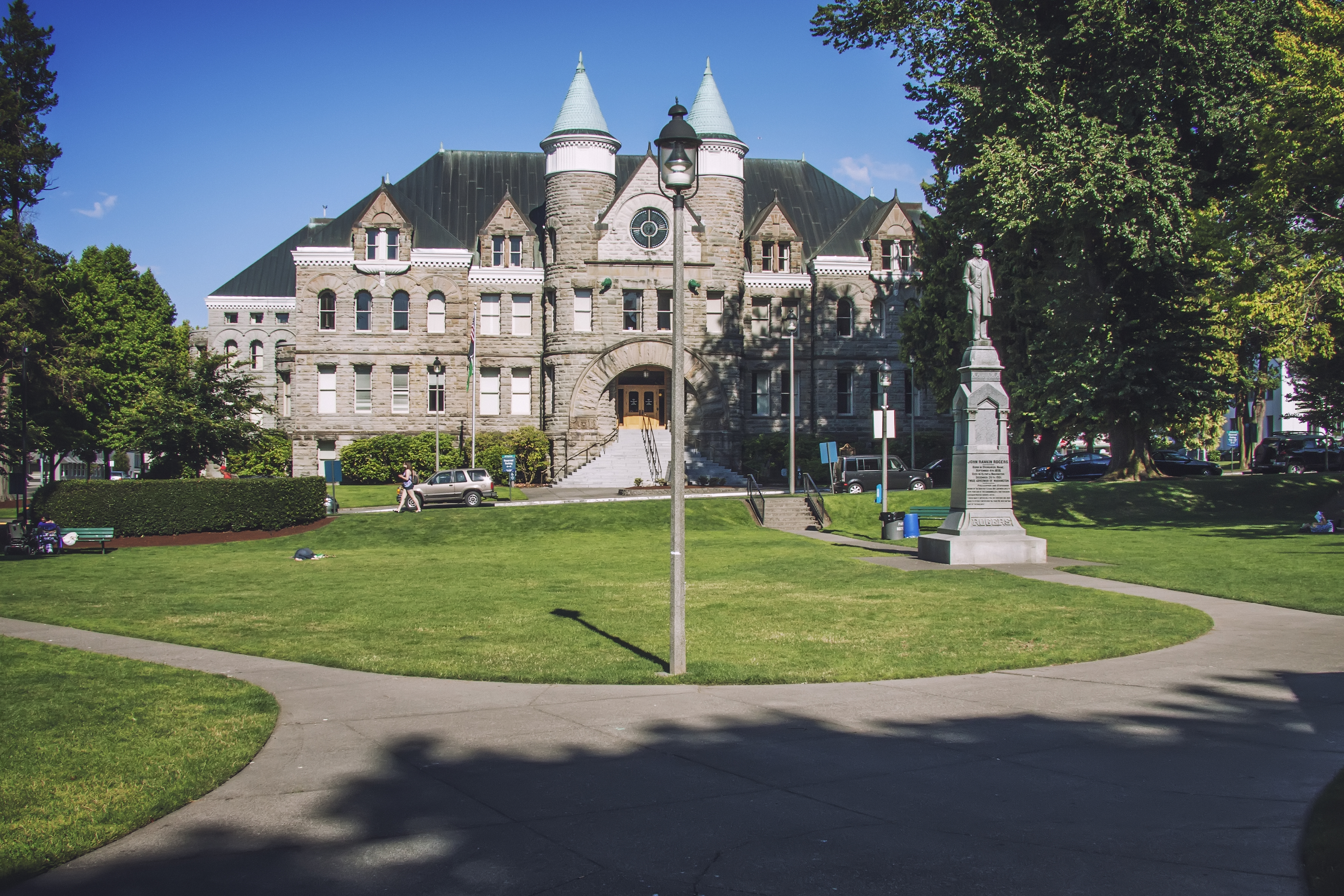
Thurston County Courthouse building Olympia. It is now known as the "Old Capitol Building". Built 1890–92, it served as the state capitol from 1905 to 1928 when the current building was completed.

A number of his works are listed on the National Register of Historic Places.

Works include (with attribution)

- Cowley County National Bank Building, 820-822 Main St. Winfield, KS (Richie Brothers), NRHP-listed
- Stockgrowers State Bank, 8th and Main Sts. Ashland, KS (Richie, W.A., Co.), NRHP-listed
- Jefferson County Courthouse, Jefferson and Case Sts. Port Townsend, WA (Ritchie, W.A.), NRHP-listed
- Old Capitol Building, 600 block Washington St. Olympia, WA (Ritchie, Willis), NRHP-listed
- Ridenbaugh Hall, University of Idaho campus Moscow, ID (Ritchie, W.A.), NRHP-listed
- Spokane County Courthouse, W. 1116 Broadway Spokane, WA (Ritchie, W.A.), NRHP-listed
- One or more works in Ninth Avenue Historic District, roughly bounded by 7th Ave., Monroe St., 12th Ave. and the Burlington Northern RR tracks Spokane, WA (Ritchie, Willis), NRHP-listed
