= 7th Minnesota Territorial Legislature =

Minnesota legislative session

Seventh Minnesota Territorial Legislature
←	6th Minnesota Territorial Legislature	8th Minnesota Territorial Legislature	→

Overview
- Legislative body: Minnesota Territorial Legislature
- Jurisdiction: Minnesota Territory, United States
- Term: January 2, 1856 – January 7, 1857

Minnesota Territorial Council
- Members: 15 Councillors
- President: John B. Brisbin
- Party control: Democratic Party

Minnesota House of Representatives
- Members: 38 Representatives
- Speaker: Charles Gardner
- Party control: Democratic Party

The seventh Minnesota Territorial Legislature first convened on January 2, 1856. The 15 members of the Minnesota Territorial Council and the 38 members of the Minnesota House of Representatives were elected during the General Election of October 9, 1855.

== Sessions ==
The territorial legislature met in a regular session from January 2, 1856 to March 1, 1856. There were no special sessions of the seventh territorial legislature.

== Party summary ==
Resignations and new members are discussed in the "Membership changes" section, below.

=== Council ===
	Party (Note: Known party affiliations taken from the members' profiles in Minnesota Legislators Past & Present.) (Shading indicates majority caucus)			Total	Vacant
	Democratic	Republican	Unknown	Total	Vacant
End of previous Legislature	9	0	0	9	0
Begin	9	2	4	15	0
December 31, 1856 (Note: D. M. Hanson died in office on an unknown date in 1856. As the actual date of his death is uncertain, Minnesota Legislators Past & Present lists December 31, 1856 as the date of the end of his term of office.)	8	2	4	14	1
January 6, 1857 (Note: The actual end dates of Charles Eugene Flandrau's and John Rollins' terms of office are unknown. Due to the uncertainty, Minnesota Legislators Past & Present lists January 6, 1857 (the day before the date on which the 8th Minnesota Territorial Legislature convened) for both.)	6	2	4	12	3
Latest voting share	50%	17%	33%		
Beginning of the next Legislature	6	5	4	15	0

=== House of Representatives ===
	Party (Shading indicates majority caucus)			Total	Vacant
	Democratic	Republican	Unknown	Total	Vacant
End of previous Legislature	13	1	4	18	0
Begin	18	12	9	38	0
January 7, 1856	19	11	9	38	0
Latest voting share	50%	29%	24%		
Beginning of the next Legislature	18	20	0	38	0

== Leadership ==
President of the Council
John B. Brisbin (D-Saint Paul)

Speaker of the House
Charles Gardner (D-Mantorville)

== Members ==
=== Council ===
Name	District	City	Party
Bailly, Henry G.	06	Hastings	Democratic
Balcombe, St. Andre Durand	09	Winona	Republican
Brisbin, John B.	02	Saint Paul	Democratic
Dooley, Samuel	06	Louisville	Unknown
Flandrau, Charles Eugene	10	Traverse de Sioux	Democratic
Freeborn, William	04	Red Wing	Democratic
Hanson, D. M.	11	Minneapolis	Democratic
Lowry, William D.	09	Rochester	Unknown
Ludden, John Dwight	01	Taylors Falls	Democratic
Rolette, Joseph	07	Pembina	Democratic
Rollins, John	03	Minneapolis	Democratic
Setzer, Henry N.	01	Stillwater	Democratic
Stone, Lewis	05	Royalton	Unknown
Thompson, Clark W.	08	Hokah	Republican
Tillotson, Benjamin F.	08	Richland	Unknown

=== House of Representatives ===
Name	District	City	Party
Bradley, James F.	11	Minneapolis	Republican
Buck, Cornelius F.	09	Winona	Democratic
Burdick, R. Carlisle	07	Pembina	Democratic
Cleaveland, Arba	11	Chanhassen	Unknown
Covel, William B.	08	Frankfort	Democratic
DeLaVergne, Aurelius F.	10	Le Sueur	Democratic
Dunbar, William Franklin	08	Caledonia	Democratic
Farnham, Sumner W.	03	Minneapolis	Republican
Galbraith, Thomas Jacob	06	Shakopee	Republican
Gardner, Charles	04	Mantorville	Democratic
Gere, William B.	08	Chatfield	Democratic
Gibbs, Oscar C.	06	Northfield	Unknown
Grant, Charles	07	Saint Joseph	Democratic
Hartenbower, John H.	09	Pleasant Grove	Democratic
Haus, Reuben	02	Saint Paul	Democratic
Holland, John M.	06	Shakopee	Republican
Hubbell, James B.	04	Mantorville	Republican
Hull, Samuel	08	Carimona	Democratic
Hunt, Thomas Benjamin	11	Chaska	Democratic
Ide, John C.	06	Faribault	Republican
Jackman, Henry A.	01	Stillwater	Republican
Johnson, Parsons King	03	Saint Paul	Democratic
Kirkman, James	09	Wabasha	Unknown
Knauft, Ferdinand	02	Saint Paul	Unknown
La Boutillier, C. W.	03	Minneapolis	Republican
Lott, Bushrod Washington	02	Saint Paul	Democratic
McLeod, George A.	10	Traverse des Sioux	Democratic
Murphy, M. T.	06	Mendota	Unknown
Nobles, William H.	02	Saint Paul	Republican
Norris, James S.	01	Cottage Grove	Democratic
Pierce, Thomas W.	11	Minneapolis	Unknown
Sturgis, William R.	05	Little Falls	Democratic
Taylor, Nathan C. D.	01	Taylors Falls	Democratic
Thompson, Martin G.	08	Brownsville	Republican
Thorndike, Francis	11	Dayton	Unknown
Van Vorhes, Abraham	01	Stillwater	Republican
Vaughan, Alanson B.	08	Lansing	Republican
Wilkinson, Ross	02	Saint Paul	Unknown
Wilson, John L.	05	Saint Cloud	Democratic

== Membership changes ==
=== Council ===
District	Vacated by	Reason for change	Successor	Date successor seated
11	D. M. Hanson (D)	Died in office on an unknown date in 1856.	Remained vacant	
10	Charles Eugene Flandrau (D)	Left office for unknown cause on a date uncertain.	Remained vacant	
03	John Rollins (D)	Resigned on a date uncertain.	Remained vacant	

=== House of Representatives ===
District	Vacated by	Reason for change	Successor	Date successor seated
08	Alanson B. Vaughn (R)	Unseated on January 7, 1856, as a result of an election challenge wherein the House determined that Covel was the legitimate winner of the election.	William B. Covel (D)	January 7, 1856

== Notes ==
Preceded by Sixth Minnesota Territorial Legislature	Seventh Minnesota Territorial Legislature; 1856	Succeeded by Eighth Minnesota Territorial Legislature
