= 8th Minnesota Territorial Legislature =

Minnesota legislative session

Eighth Minnesota Territorial Legislature
←	7th Minnesota Territorial Legislature	1st Minnesota Legislature	→

Overview
- Legislative body: Minnesota Territorial Legislature
- Jurisdiction: Minnesota Territory, United States
- Term: January 7, 1857 – December 2, 1857

Minnesota Territorial Council
- Members: 15 Councillors
- President: John B. Brisbin
- Party control: Democratic Party

Minnesota House of Representatives
- Members: 38 Representatives
- Speaker: Joseph W. Furber
- Party control: Republican Party

The 8th Minnesota Territorial Legislature first convened on January 7, 1857. The 15 members of the Minnesota Territorial Council were elected during the General Election of October 9, 1855, and the 38 members of the Minnesota House of Representatives were elected during the General Election of October 14, 1856. The 8th territorial legislature was the final territorial legislature held before the Territory of Minnesota was dissolved and Minnesota was admitted as a state.

== Sessions ==
The territorial legislature met in a regular session from January 7, 1857 to March 7, 1857. A special session was convened from April 27, 1857 to May 25, 1857 to consider various matters which had not been acted upon during the regular session, including numerous incorporations, as well as to provide for the payment of the expenses of the constitutional convention which convened to draft the Constitution of the State of Minnesota roughly two weeks after the special session adjourned.

== Party summary ==
Resignations and new members are discussed in the "Membership changes" section, below.

=== Council ===
	Party (Note: Known party affiliations taken from the members' profiles in Minnesota Legislators Past & Present.) (Shading indicates majority caucus)			Total	Vacant
	Democratic	Republican	Unknown	Total	Vacant
End of previous Legislature	6	2	4	12	3
Begin	6	5	4	15	0
Latest voting share	40%	33%	27%		
Beginning of the next Legislature	20	17	0	37	0

=== House of Representatives ===
	Party (Shading indicates majority caucus)			Total	Vacant
	Democratic	Republican	Unknown	Total	Vacant
End of previous Legislature	19	11	9	38	0
Begin	18	20	0	38	0
January 22, 1857 (Note: On January 22, 1857, Joseph R. Brown was admitted as a member of the House. He appears to have been admitted as an additional member, as both of the other members from his district (Francis Baasen and Ozro A. Thomas) continue to appear in the journal as members after the date on which J.R. Brown was sworn in.)	19	20	0	39	0
March 7, 1857 (Note: The date of Morgan L. Noble's resignation is uncertain. Minnesota Legislators Past & Present lists the date of the end of the regular session.)	19	19	0	38	1
April 27, 1857	19	20	0	39	0
Latest voting share	49%	51%	0%		
Beginning of the next Legislature	43	37	0	80	0

== Leadership ==
President of the Council
John B. Brisbin (D-Saint Paul)

Speaker of the House
Joseph W. Furber (R-Cottage Grove)

== Members ==
=== Council ===
Name	District	City	Party
Bailly, Henry G.	06	Hastings	Democratic
Balcombe, St. Andre Durand	09	Winona	Republican
Bassett, Joel B.	11	Minneapolis	Republican
Brisbin, John B.	02	Saint Paul	Democratic
Dooley, Samuel	06	Louisville	Unknown
Freeborn, William	04	Red Wing	Democratic
Humphrey, Philander P.	10	Oshawa	Republican
Lowry, William D.	09	Rochester	Unknown
Ludden, John Dwight	01	Taylors Falls	Democratic
Rolette, Joseph	07	Pembina	Democratic
Setzer, Henry N.	01	Stillwater	Democratic
Stone, Lewis	05	Royalton	Unknown
Thompson, Clark W.	08	Hokah	Republican
Tillotson, Benjamin F.	08	Richland	Unknown
Wales, William W.	03	Saint Anthony	Republican

=== House of Representatives ===
Name	District	City	Party
Abbe, Samuel B.	05	Saint Paul	Democratic
Adams, Charles Powell	06	Hastings	Democratic
Baasen, Francis	10	New Ulm	Democratic
Barrows, Eli B.	09	Pleasant Grove	Democratic
Berry, John McDonogh	08	Faribault	Republican
Black, Mahlon	01	Stillwater	Democratic
Branch, William	02	Saint Paul	Republican
Brown, Joseph Renshaw	10	Henderson	Democratic
Brown, Luther M.	06	Shakopee	Republican
Case, Dana F.	08	Houston	Republican
Chamblin, Allen T.	02	Saint Paul	Democratic
Chase, Jonathan N.	03	Saint Anthony	Republican
Costello, William	02	Saint Paul	Democratic
Foster, Alonzo P.	09	Plainview	Republican
Furber, Joseph Warren	01	Cottage Grove	Republican
Gere, William B.	08	Chatfield	Democratic
Grant, Charles	07	Saint Joseph	Democratic
Greeley, Elam	01	Stillwater	Democratic
Hayden, Wentworth	11	Champlin	Republican
Hechtman, Henry	03	Minneapolis	Republican
Howell, Warren J.	08	Canton	Republican
Jewett, Charles	06	Warsaw	Republican
Keith, Asa	11	Richfield	Republican
King, Ephraim L.	09	Winona	Republican
Kingsbury, William W.	05	Endion	Democratic
McVey, John J.	06	Marshan	Democratic
Murray, William Pitt	02	Saint Paul	Democratic
Noble, Morgan L.	06	Unknown	Republican
Payne, Nelson	04	Unknown	Democratic
Plumer, John P.	11	Brooklyn	Republican
Ramsey, Justus Cornelius	02	Saint Paul	Republican
Smith, Delano T.	11	Minneapolis	Republican
Stannard, Lucius K.	01	Taylors Falls	Republican
Sweeney, William Wilson	04	Red Wing	Democratic
Thomas, Ozro A.	10	Clinton Falls	Republican
Thompson, Martin G.	08	Brownsville	Republican
Troll, John M.	11	Chaska	Republican
Whitlock, Friend J.	06	Belle Plaine	Democratic
Wilkie, John B.	07	Pembina	Democratic
Wilson, John L.	05	Saint Cloud	Democratic

== Membership changes ==
=== House of Representatives ===
District	Vacated by	Reason for change	Successor	Date successor seated
06	Morgan Noble (R)	Resigned on a date uncertain.	Charles Jewett (R)	April 27, 1857

== Notes ==
Preceded by Seventh Minnesota Territorial Legislature	Eighth Minnesota Territorial Legislature; 1857	Succeeded by First Minnesota Legislature
