= 3rd Minnesota Territorial Legislature =

Minnesota legislative session

Third Minnesota Territorial Legislature
| ← | 2nd Minnesota Territorial Legislature | 4th Minnesota Territorial Legislature | → |

Overview
- Legislative body: Minnesota Territorial Legislature
- Jurisdiction: Minnesota Territory, United States
- Term: January 7, 1852 – January 5, 1853

Minnesota Territorial Council
- Members: 9 Councillors
- President: William Henry Forbes
- Party control: Democratic Party

Minnesota House of Representatives
- Members: 18 Representatives
- Speaker: John D. Ludden
- Party control: Democratic Party

The third Minnesota Territorial Legislature first convened on January 7, 1852. The 9 members of the Minnesota Territorial Council and the 18 members of the Minnesota House of Representatives were elected during the General Election of October 14, 1851.

== Sessions ==
The territorial legislature met in a regular session from January 7, 1852 to March 6, 1852. There were no special sessions of the third territorial legislature.

== Party summary ==
=== Council ===
| | Party (Note: Known party affiliations taken from the members' profiles in Minnesota Legislators Past & Present.) (Shading indicates majority caucus) | | Total | Vacant |
| | Democratic | Whig | Total | Vacant |
|---|---|---|---|---|
| End of previous Legislature | 6 | 3 | 9 | 0 |
| Begin | 7 | 2 | 9 | 0 |
| Latest voting share | 78% | 22% | | |
| Beginning of the next Legislature | 7 | 2 | 9 | 0 |

=== House of Representatives ===
| | Party (Shading indicates majority caucus) | | | Total | Vacant |
| | Democratic | Whig | Unknown | Total | Vacant |
|---|---|---|---|---|---|
| End of previous Legislature | 5 | 3 | 4 | 11 | 7 |
| Begin | 10 | 3 | 5 | 18 | 0 |
| Latest voting share | 56% | 17% | 28% | | |
| Beginning of the next Legislature | 13 | 3 | 2 | 18 | 0 |

== Leadership ==
President of the Council
William Henry Forbes (D-Saint Paul)

Speaker of the House
John D. Ludden (D-Marine)

== Members ==
=== Council ===
| Name | District | City | Party |
|---|---|---|---|
| Babcock, Lorenzo A. | 04 | Saint Paul | Whig |
| Farrington, George W. | 02 | Saint Paul | Democratic |
| Forbes, William Henry | 02 | Saint Paul | Democratic |
| Greeley, Elam | 01 | Stillwater | Democratic |
| Kittson, Norman Wolfred | 07 | Pembina | Democratic |
| Larned, William L. | 03 | Saint Anthony Falls | Democratic |
| Loomis, David B. | 01 | Marine | Whig |
| Lowry, Sylvanus B. | 05 | Watab | Democratic |
| McLeod, Martin | 06 | Bloomington | Democratic |

=== House of Representatives ===
| Name | District | City | Party |
|---|---|---|---|
| Beatty, James | 05 | Sauk Rapids | Unknown |
| Black, Mahlon | 01 | Stillwater | Democratic |
| Boal, James McClellan | 06 | Mendota | Whig |
| Cave, Charles S. | 02 | Saint Paul | Democratic |
| Day, David | 05 | Long Prairie | Whig |
| Farnham, Sumner W. | 03 | Saint Anthony Falls | Unknown |
| Findley, Samuel J. | 02 | Saint Paul | Democratic |
| Fullerton, Joseph E. | 02 | Saint Paul | Democratic |
| Gingras, Antoine Blanc | 07 | Saint Joseph | Democratic |
| Leavitt, Martin | 01 | Denmark | Unknown |
| Ludden, John Dwight | 01 | Marine | Democratic |
| Murphy, John H. | 03 | Saint Anthony | Whig |
| Murray, William Pitt | 02 | Saint Paul | Democratic |
| Randall, Benjamin H. | 06 | Fort Snelling | Democratic |
| Richards, Fordyce S. | 04 | Reads Landing | Unknown |
| Rolette, Joseph | 07 | Pembina | Democratic |
| Selby, Jeremiah W. | 02 | Saint Paul | Democratic |
| Taylor, Jesse | 01 | Stillwater | Unknown |

== Notes ==
| Preceded by Second Minnesota Territorial Legislature | Third Minnesota Territorial Legislature; 1852 | Succeeded by Fourth Minnesota Territorial Legislature |
