= 4th Minnesota Territorial Legislature =

Minnesota legislative session

Fourth Minnesota Territorial Legislature
←	3rd Minnesota Territorial Legislature	5th Minnesota Territorial Legislature	→

Overview
- Legislative body: Minnesota Territorial Legislature
- Jurisdiction: Minnesota Territory, United States
- Term: January 5, 1853 – January 4, 1854

Minnesota Territorial Council
- Members: 9 Councillors
- President: Martin McLeod
- Party control: Democratic Party

Minnesota House of Representatives
- Members: 18 Representatives
- Speaker: David Day
- Party control: Democratic Party

The fourth Minnesota Territorial Legislature first convened on January 5, 1853. The 9 members of the Minnesota Territorial Council were elected during the General Election of October 14, 1851, and the 18 members of the Minnesota House of Representatives were elected during the General Election of October 12, 1852.

== Sessions ==
The territorial legislature met in a regular session from January 5, 1853, to March 5, 1853. There were no special sessions of the fourth territorial legislature.

== Party summary ==
=== Council ===
	Party (Note: Known party affiliations taken from the members' profiles in Minnesota Legislators Past & Present.) (Shading indicates majority caucus)		Total	Vacant
	Democratic	Whig	Total	Vacant
End of previous Legislature	7	2	9	0
Begin	7	2	9	0
Latest voting share	78%	22%		
Beginning of the next Legislature	9	0	9	0

=== House of Representatives ===
	Party (Shading indicates majority caucus)			Total	Vacant
	Democratic	Whig	Unknown	Total	Vacant
End of previous Legislature	10	3	5	18	0
Begin	13	3	2	18	0
Latest voting share	72%	17%	11%		
Beginning of the next Legislature	13	5	0	18	0

== Leadership ==
President of the Council
Martin McLeod (D-Bloomington)

Speaker of the House
David Day (W-Long Prairie)

== Members ==
=== Council ===
Name	District	City	Party
Babcock, Lorenzo A.	04	Saint Paul	Whig
Farrington, George W.	02	Saint Paul	Democratic
Forbes, William Henry	02	Saint Paul	Democratic
Greeley, Elam	01	Stillwater	Democratic
Kittson, Norman Wolfred	07	Pembina	Democratic
Larned, William L.	03	Saint Anthony Falls	Democratic
Loomis, David B.	01	Marine	Whig
Lowry, Sylvanus B.	05	Watab	Democratic
McLeod, Martin	06	Bloomington	Democratic

=== House of Representatives ===
Name	District	City	Party
Ames, Alfred Elisha	06	Saint Anthony	Democratic
Day, David	05	Long Prairie	Whig
Dutton, George Brintnall	03	Saint Anthony	Unknown
Gingras, Antoine Blanc	07	Saint Joseph	Democratic
Lott, Bushrod Washington	02	Saint Paul	Democratic
Ludden, John Dwight	01	Marine	Democratic
McKee, J.	05	Unknown	Unknown
Murray, William Pitt	02	Saint Paul	Democratic
Noot, William	02	Saint Paul	Democratic
Oliver, Louis M.	02	Saint Paul	Democratic
Ramsey, Justus Cornelius	02	Saint Paul	Whig
Randall, Benjamin H.	06	Fort Snelling	Democratic
Rolette, Joseph	07	Pembina	Democratic
Russell, Roswell P.	03	Saint Anthony	Democratic
Stimson, Albert	01	Stillwater	Democratic
Truax, Caleb	01	Point Douglas	Democratic
Wells, James	04	Lake City	Democratic
Wilcox, N. Green	01	Stillwater	Whig

== Notes ==
Preceded by Third Minnesota Territorial Legislature	Fourth Minnesota Territorial Legislature; 1853	Succeeded by Fifth Minnesota Territorial Legislature
