= 6th Minnesota Territorial Legislature =

Minnesota legislative session

Sixth Minnesota Territorial Legislature
←	5th Minnesota Territorial Legislature	7th Minnesota Territorial Legislature	→

Overview
- Legislative body: Minnesota Territorial Legislature
- Jurisdiction: Minnesota Territory, United States
- Term: January 3, 1855 – January 2, 1856

Minnesota Territorial Council
- Members: 9 Councillors
- President: Samuel Baldwin Olmstead, William Pitt Murray
- Party control: Democratic Party

Minnesota House of Representatives
- Members: 18 Representatives
- Speaker: James S. Norris
- Party control: Democratic Party

The sixth Minnesota Territorial Legislature first convened on January 3, 1855. The 9 members of the Minnesota Territorial Council were elected during the General Election of October 12, 1853, and the 18 members of the Minnesota House of Representatives were elected during the General Election of October 10, 1854.

== Sessions ==
The territorial legislature met in a regular session from January 3, 1855 to March 3, 1855. There were no special sessions of the sixth territorial legislature.

== Party summary ==
=== Council ===
	Party (Note: Known party affiliations taken from the members' profiles in Minnesota Legislators Past & Present.) (Shading indicates majority caucus)			Total	Vacant
	Democratic	Republican	Unknown	Total	Vacant
End of previous Legislature	9	0	0	9	0
Begin	9	0	0	9	0
Latest voting share	100%	0%	0%		
Beginning of the next Legislature	9	2	4	15	0

=== House of Representatives ===
	Party (Shading indicates majority caucus)				Total	Vacant
	Democratic	Republican	Whig	Unknown	Total	Vacant
End of previous Legislature	13	0	5	0	18	0
Begin	13	1	0	4	18	0
Latest voting share	72%	6%	0%	22%		
Beginning of the next Legislature	18	10	0	10	38	0

== Leadership ==
President of the Council
Until February 16 Samuel Baldwin Olmstead (D-Belle Prairie)
Since February 16 William Pitt Murray (D-Saint Paul)

Speaker of the House
James S. Norris (D-Cottage Grove)

== Members ==
=== Council ===
Name	District	City	Party
Brown, Joseph Renshaw	06	Henderson	Democratic
Freeborn, William	04	Red Wing	Democratic
Kittson, Norman Wolfred	07	Pembina	Democratic
Mower, John E.	01	Stillwater	Democratic
Murray, William Pitt	02	Saint Paul	Democratic
Olmstead, Samuel Baldwin	05	Belle Prairie	Democratic
Stearns, Charles Thomas	03	Saint Anthony	Democratic
Stimson, Albert	01	Stillwater	Democratic
Van Etten, Isaac	02	Saint Paul	Democratic

=== House of Representatives ===
Name	District	City	Party
Andros, Frederic	05	Long Prairie	Unknown
Beatty, James	05	Sauk Rapids	Unknown
Brawley, Daniel F.	02	Saint Paul	Democratic
Cave, Charles S.	02	Saint Paul	Democratic
Davis, William A.	02	Belle Plaine	Democratic
Dixon, James B.	01	Unknown	Unknown
Fridley, Abram McCormick	03	Fridley	Democratic
Grant, Charles	07	Saint Joseph	Democratic
Hanson, D. M.	06	Minneapolis	Democratic
Haus, Reuben	02	Saint Paul	Democratic
LeMay, Joseph	02	Saint Paul	Democratic
Norris, James S.	01	Cottage Grove	Democratic
Register, Samuel M.	01	Stillwater	Unknown
Rolette, Joseph	07	Pembina	Democratic
Sibley, Henry Hastings	06	Mendota	Democratic
Stanchfield, Daniel	03	Saint Anthony	Democratic
Thompson, Clark W.	04	Hokah	Republican
Willim, William	01	Stillwater	Democratic

== Notes ==
Preceded by Fifth Minnesota Territorial Legislature	Sixth Minnesota Territorial Legislature; 1855	Succeeded by Seventh Minnesota Territorial Legislature
