= 5th Minnesota Territorial Legislature =

Minnesota legislative session

Fifth Minnesota Territorial Legislature
←	4th Minnesota Territorial Legislature	6th Minnesota Territorial Legislature	→

Overview
- Legislative body: Minnesota Territorial Legislature
- Jurisdiction: Minnesota Territory, United States
- Term: January 4, 1854 – January 3, 1855

Minnesota Territorial Council
- Members: 9 Councillors
- President: Samuel Baldwin Olmstead
- Party control: Democratic Party

Minnesota House of Representatives
- Members: 18 Representatives
- Speaker: Nathan C. D. Taylor
- Party control: Democratic Party

The fifth Minnesota Territorial Legislature first convened on January 4, 1854. The 9 members of the Minnesota Territorial Council and the 18 members of the Minnesota House of Representatives were elected during the General Election of October 12, 1853.

== Sessions ==
The territorial legislature met in a regular session from January 4, 1854 to March 4, 1854. There were no special sessions of the fifth territorial legislature.

== Party summary ==
=== Council ===
	Party (Note: Known party affiliations taken from the members' profiles in Minnesota Legislators Past & Present.) (Shading indicates majority caucus)		Total	Vacant
	Democratic	Whig	Total	Vacant
End of previous Legislature	7	2	9	0
Begin	9	0	9	0
Latest voting share	100%	0%		
Beginning of the next Legislature	9	0	9	0

=== House of Representatives ===
	Party (Shading indicates majority caucus)				Total	Vacant
	Democratic	Republican	Whig	Unknown	Total	Vacant
End of previous Legislature	13	0	3	2	18	0
Begin	13	0	5	0	18	0
Latest voting share	72%	0%	28%	0%		
Beginning of the next Legislature	13	1	0	4	18	0

== Leadership ==
President of the Council
Samuel Baldwin Olmstead (D-Belle Prairie)

Speaker of the House
Nathan C. D. Taylor (D-Taylors Falls)

== Members ==
=== Council ===
Name	District	City	Party
Brown, Joseph Renshaw	06	Henderson	Democratic
Freeborn, William	04	Red Wing	Democratic
Kittson, Norman Wolfred	07	Pembina	Democratic
Mower, John E.	01	Stillwater	Democratic
Murray, William Pitt	02	Saint Paul	Democratic
Olmstead, Samuel Baldwin	05	Belle Prairie	Democratic
Stearns, Charles Thomas	03	Saint Anthony	Democratic
Stimson, Albert	01	Stillwater	Democratic
Van Etten, Isaac	02	Saint Paul	Democratic

=== House of Representatives ===
Name	District	City	Party
Bartlett, Louis	02	Unknown	Democratic
Davis, William A.	02	Belle Plaine	Democratic
Day, John H.	02	Unknown	Whig
Fisher, John	01	Stillwater	Democratic
Fletcher, Hezekiah	06	Unknown	Democratic
Gardner, Cephas	03	Saint Anthony	Democratic
Lord, Orville M.	04	Minnesota City	Democratic
McKusick, William	01	Stillwater	Whig
Morrison, Donald G.	07	Unknown	Democratic
Nobles, William H.	06	Saint Paul	Whig
Noot, William	02	Saint Paul	Democratic
Plummer, Henry S.	03	Saint Anthony	Whig
Richardson, Reuben M.	05	Sauk Rapids	Democratic
Rolette, Joseph	07	Pembina	Democratic
Roy, Peter	05	Belle Plaine	Democratic
Sloan, Levi	02	Saint Paul	Democratic
Taylor, Nathan C. D.	01	Taylors Falls	Democratic
Watson, Robert	01	Cottage Grove	Whig

== Notes ==
Preceded by Fourth Minnesota Territorial Legislature	Fifth Minnesota Territorial Legislature; 1854	Succeeded by Sixth Minnesota Territorial Legislature
