= John Rollins =

John Rollins may refer to:

- John Rollins (golfer) (born 1975), American golfer
- John Rollins (Minnesota politician) (1806–1883), American politician from Minnesota
- John C. Rollins, American politician from Arkansas
- John E. Rollins (1940–2007), American politician from Missouri
- John W. Rollins (1916–2000), American politician and from Delaware
- John Wenlock Rollins (1862–1940), English sculptor

== See also ==
- Jack Rollins (disambiguation)
