= Jonathan N. Chase =

American businessman and politician (1817–1904)

- Chase c. 1858

Member of the Minnesota Senate from the 23rd District
- In office December 2, 1857 – December 6, 1859

Member of the Minnesota Territorial House of Representatives from the 3rd District
- In office January 7, 1857 – December 1, 1857

Personal details
- Born: December 31, 1817 Sebec, Maine, U.S.
- Died: February 1, 1904 (aged 86) Minneapolis, Minnesota, U.S.
- Other political affiliations: Republican

Military service
- Allegiance: United States of America
- Branch/service: Union Army
- Years of service: 1862–1865
- Rank: Captain
- Unit: Company A, 9th Minnesota Infantry Regiment
- Battles/wars: Dakota War of 1862; Battle of Birch Coulee; Battle of Wood Lake; Sibley's 1863 Campaign; Battle of Big Mound; Battle of Dead Buffalo Lake; Battle of Stony Lake

Jonathan N. Chase (December 31, 1817 – February 1, 1904) was an American businessman, military officer, and politician who served in both the Minnesota Territorial House of Representatives and the Minnesota Senate. Chase was a notable person in the lumber industries of Minnesota and Wisconsin, he introduced lumber mills to the Gull River, Rum River, and Mille Lacs Lake.

== Early life and career ==
Chase was born on December 31, 1817 in Sebec, Maine. Chase worked in the lumber industry in Maine before moving to Wisconsin in 1854 where he worked in the lumber industries on the Chippewa River, St. Croix River, Menominee River, and Willow River.

Chase moved to Minnesota Territory in 1855 and settled in St. Anthony, Minnesota, he quickly entered a business partnership with Samuel A. Jewett. Jewett was an early settler of Minnesota and Wisconsin from Maine who was also heavily involved in the lumber industry. Chase and Jewett's lumber company primarily worked on the Rum River and Gull River in Minnesota. Chase later partnered with the Leavitt & Horr lumber company for a time before becoming business partners with Charles Alfred Pillsbury in 1879 and working for the C.A. Pillsbury and Company.

== Politics and military service ==
Beginning on October 14, 1856, Chase was elected to the Minnesota Territorial Legislature to represent the Minnesota Territory's 3rd House district. Chase would serve during the 8th Minnesota Territorial Legislature from January 7, 1857 to December 1, 1857. During his term Chase was the chairman of the Lumbering Interests Committee and served on the Elections Committee and Ferries Special Committee.

Chase was later elected to the Minnesota Senate on October 13, 1857. Chase would serve during the 1st Minnesota Legislature from December 2, 1857 to December 6, 1859. During his term Chase was a member of the Credentials, Public Buildings, and State Affairs Committees. Chase was a member of the Republican Party of Minnesota.

During the Dakota War of 1862 Chase volunteered for service in the Union Army on August 17, 1862 and was enrolled into the ranks of Company A of the 9th Minnesota Infantry Regiment as a First Lieutenant. Company A of the 9th Minnesota fought in the conflict at the Battle of Birch Coulee and the Battle of Wood Lake before participating in Sibley's 1863 Campaign, a punitive expedition against the Dakota people led by General Henry Hastings Sibley. Chase was promoted to the rank of Captain before resigning from the military on October 5, 1863.

== Later life ==
Following the conflict Chase returned to Minneapolis and continued to work in the lumber industry.

Chase died on February 1, 1904 in Minneapolis.

== Personal life ==
Chase was married to Melissa Pollard in February 1853, together they had a total of seven children.

== Legacy ==
Chase Lake in Itasca County, Minnesota and Chase Brook in Mille Lacs County, Minnesota are both named in honor of Chase.
