= Samuel Hull =

American judge and politician (1807 – 1889)

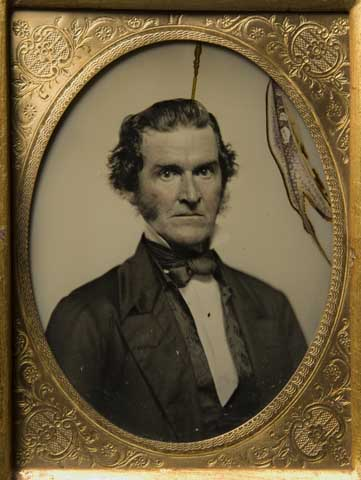
- Hull c. 1857

Member of the Minnesota Senate from Minnesota's 9th Senate District
- In office December 2, 1857 – December 6, 1859

Member of the Minnesota Territorial Legislature from the 8th District
- In office January 2, 1856 – January 6, 1857

Personal details
- Born: August 14, 1807 Mercer County, Pennsylvania, U.S.
- Died: February 17, 1889 (aged 81) Marshalltown, Iowa, U.S.
- Resting place: Riverside Cemetery; Marshalltown, Iowa, U.S.
- Other political affiliations: Independent

Samuel B. Hull (August 14, 1807 – February 17, 1889) was an American politician and farmer. During his political career Hull served a single term in both the Minnesota Territorial Legislature and later in the Minnesota Senate during the 1st Minnesota Legislature.

== Biography ==
Hull was born on August 14, 1807 in Mercer County, Pennsylvania. He was the son of Bashara Hull and Rhoda Higbee-Hull.

In 1856 Hull ran for seat in the Minnesota Territorial Legislature as a representative in the Territorial House's eight district. Hull ultimately won the 1856 house election on October 9, 1856 and served a single term in the 7th Minnesota Territorial Legislature. At the time Hull was listed as residing in Carimona Township in southern Fillmore County, Minnesota, the eight district at the time represented Fillmore County, Houston County, and Mower County. Hull was the chair of the agricultural and manufacturing committee and the territorial affairs committee.

Hull was later elected to the Minnesota Senate on October 13, 1857 and served a single term in the 1st Minnesota Legislature from December 2, 1857 to December 6, 1859 representing Fillmore County. During the first legislative session Hull was the chair of the public lands committee, and a member of the agricultural and manufacturing and Indian affairs committees.

Following his term in the Minnesota Senate Hull moved to Marshalltown, Iowa in 1861 with his family. Hull died on February 17, 1899 and is buried in the Riverside Cemetery in Marshalltown.
