= William H. Nobles =

American politician

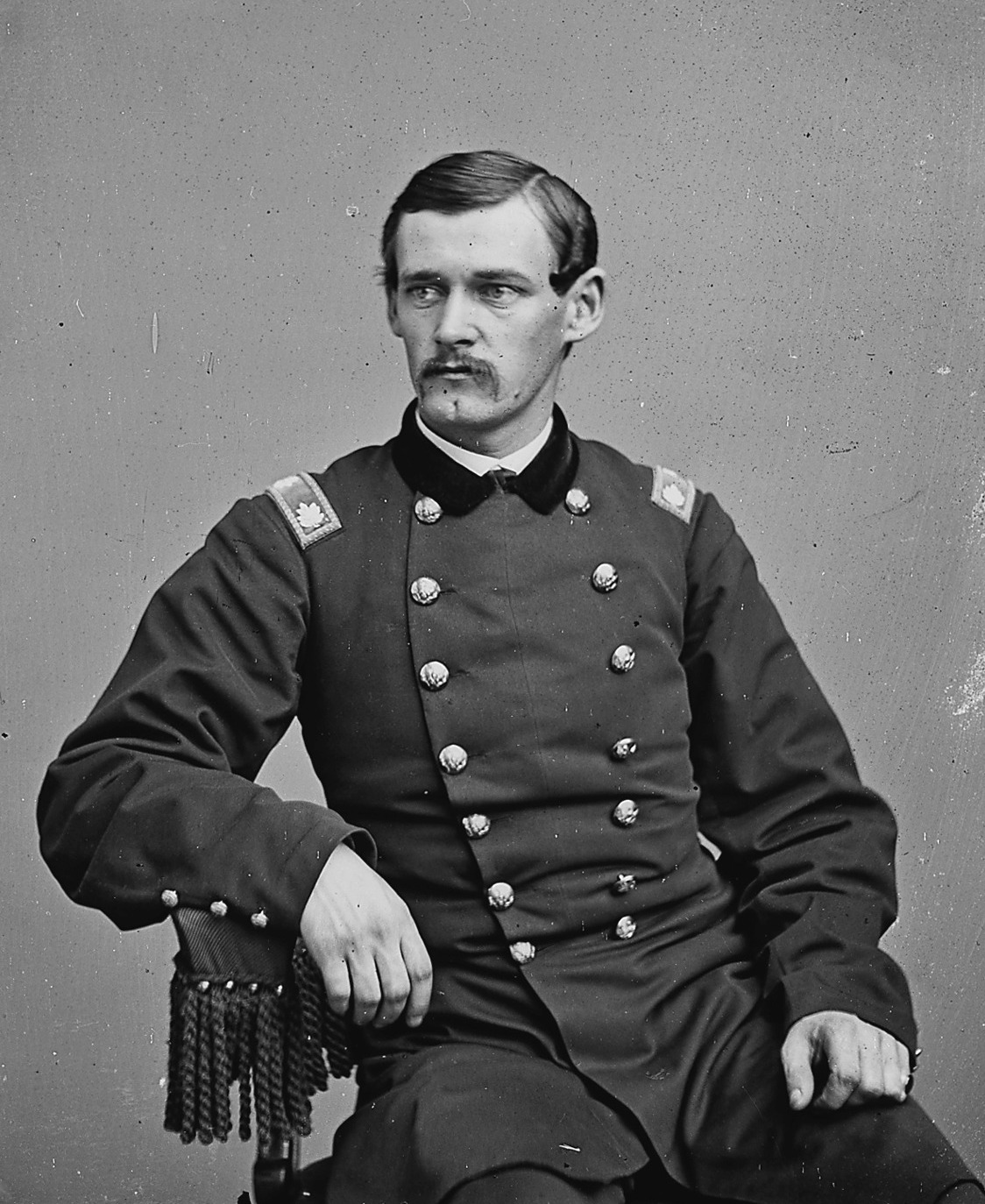
- Lieut. Col. William H. Noble, photo taken between c. 1860 and c. 1865

Member of the Minnesota Territorial Legislature for the 6th district
- In office January 4, 1854 – January 3, 1855
- Preceded by: Benjamin H. Randall; Alfred Elisha Ames
- Succeeded by: D. M. Hanson; Henry Hastings Sibley

Member of the Minnesota Territorial Legislature for the 2nd district
- In office January 2, 1856 – January 7, 1857
- Preceded by: Daniel F. Brawley; Charles S. Cave; William A. Davis; Reuben Haus; Joseph LeMay
- Succeeded by: William Branch; Allen T. Chamblin; William Costello; William Pitt Murray; Justus Cornelius Ramsey

Personal details
- Born: 1816 Genesee County, New York, USA
- Died: December 28, 1876 (aged 59–60) Saint Paul, Minnesota, USA
- Party: Republican
- Other political affiliations: Whig (1854-1855)

William H. Nobles (1816 – December 28, 1876) was a U.S military officer, Treasury Agent, businessman, politician and trailblazer.

== Early life ==
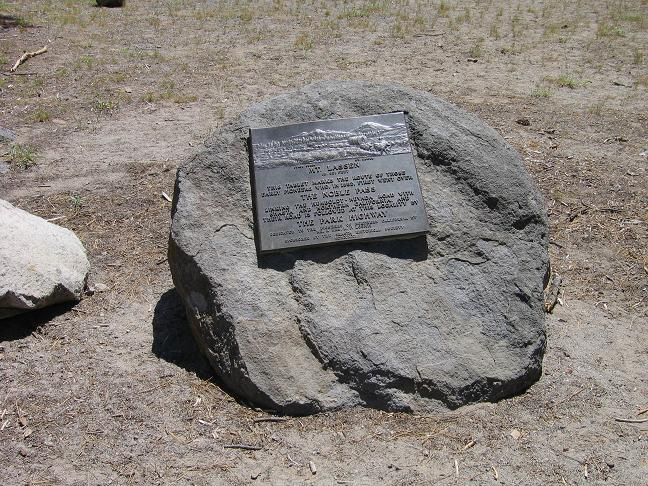
Nobles Emigrant Trail Plaque

Nobles was born in Genesee County, New York in 1816. In 1841, he moved to Wisconsin Territory and settled in what would later become St. Croix Falls, Wisconsin. He then moved to what would later be Hudson, Wisconsin, where he is credited with building the first wood-frame house. Nobles then moved across the river to Stillwater, Wisconsin, where he is credited with being involved in building the first gristmill. In 1848, Nobles settled in Saint Paul, Wisconsin Territory. He established a blacksmith wagon building business on Robert Street and was a machinist. In 1849 Nobles headed to Shasta, California where "he and Peter Lassen explored Honey Lake Valley in search of the legendary Gold Lake in 1851. When they failed to find Gold Lake, Lassen returned, but Nobles continued eastward, accidentally scouting a shorter trail into California. The Nobles Trail was a wagon route between Black Rock Desert in Nevada and the gold mining town of Shasta City in California." "The Nobles Trail proved to be one of the easiest of all the wagon routes into northern California and saw heavy use," until the transcontinental railway made wagon trails obsolete.

== Political career ==
Nobles returned to Minnesota and the Territorial Governor Alexander Ramsey named him County surveyor for the newly created Scott County. He then ran for office and became Scott County surveyor, register of deeds and auditor. On top of that he was elected to the 5th Territorial Legislature as a representative for the 6th district. From 1854 to 1856, Nobles served in the Minnesota Territorial House of Representatives. He also served on the Saint Paul City Council in 1855 and 1856. His brick home was in the middle of Rice Street on the Como Road. He was named superintendent of construction for a wagon road for the Department of Interior from Fort Ridgely to south pass Nebraska Territory. This project was not completed for lack of departmental support. In 1859 Nobles put together an expedition in St. Paul to break a trail to Fraser River country in British Columbia where gold had been found. When he reached the Saskatchewan River, he turned back even with Pierre Bottineau in his group.

== Military and death ==
When the Civil War broke out, Nobles returned to his native New York where he served in the 79th New York Volunteer Infantry as a Lt. Colonel. The 79th was an element of 2nd Brigade of T. W. Sherman's Expeditionary Corps in South Carolina. On 3 December 1861 Nobles resigned his commission and General Thomas W. Sherman appointed him to collect and sell the abandoned cotton in Hilton Head and the Sea Islands for the Treasury Department. The U.S. was to get 94% of the sale with Nobles receiving the remaining 6%. By 24 December 1861 he had sold $30,000 worth of cotton. Once all the abandoned cotton had been sold he became a revenue collector and quartermaster responsible for troop transportation around Mobile.

Post-war his health failed and even though his rank had been Lt. Colonel he was referred to as "Colonel". He moved to Waukesha Springs, Wisconsin for his health and then Hot Springs, Colorado. He died in Saint Paul shortly after he returned to Minnesota. Nobles County, Minnesota was named in his honor. The Fort Ridgely wagon road Nobles pioneered passed through the eastern third of what became Nobles County.
