= James Wells (Minnesota politician) =

American schoolteacher and politician

Member of the Minnesota Territorial House of Representatives
- In office September 3, 1849 – January 6, 1852
- In office January 5, 1853 – January 3, 1854

Personal details
- Born: 1804 New Jersey
- Died: August 18, 1864 (aged 59–60) along the Rock River in Minnesota
- Party: Democratic
- Occupation: Trader, politician

James "Bully" Wells (1804 – August 18, 1864) was an American trader and politician who served in the Minnesota Territorial House of Representatives from 1849 to 1852, and again from 1853 to 1854.

== Biography ==
Wells was born in New Jersey around 1804. He was noted to have been a soldier stationed at Fort Snelling prior to his career in trading. Around 1833, Wells was listed as a trader in Inyan Ceyaka Otonwe. By his election in 1849, however, his residence was listed as Lake Pepin. His election to the 1st Minnesota Territorial Legislature was contested by Whig Harley D. White. Wells won by a margin of 33 to 29, however White argued that six of Wells' voters were not legal residents of the territory. However, a resolution that Wells was not entitled to his seat failed to pass, as his fellow Democrats largely voted against the resolution, while the Whigs supported it. He was re-elected to the 2nd Minnesota Territorial Legislature. He lost his election campaign, although was re-elected into the 4th Minnesota Territorial Legislature in 1853.

Wells, along with his daughter, died on August 18, 1864, during a trapping expedition along the Rock River. While his two sons and their American Indian colleague went on an elk hunt, a band of American Indians shot and killed Wells and wounded his daughter, who died en route to Faribault.
