= 2nd Minnesota Sharpshooters Company =

- Active: 1862–1865
- Disbanded: 1865
- Country: United States of America; Union
- Allegiance: Union Army
- Type: Company
- Role: Sharpshooter
- Size: 100
- Nicknames: Russell's Company of Sharpshooters; Bürger's Company of Sharpshooters; Mahlon's Company of Sharpshooters
- Engagements: American Civil War: Battle of Fair Oaks; Seven Days Battles; Battle of Antietam; Battle of Fredericksburg; Battle of Chancellorsville; Battle of Gettysburg; Battle of the Wilderness; Battle of Spotsylvania Courthouse; Battle of Cold Harbor; Siege of Petersburg

Commanders
- Captain: William F. Russell
- Captain: Emil A. Bürger
- Captain: Mahlon Black

The 2nd Minnesota Sharpshooters Company or Company L of the 1st Minnesota Infantry Regiment was a unit of the Union Army during the American Civil War. One of 18 companies of sharpshooters placed under the command of Colonel Hiram Berdan; the companies would eventually form two regiments who shared the nickname of “Berdan’s Sharpshooters.”

== History ==
=== Origins ===
Berdan formed these units with the intention of providing the army a superior force of marksman who could serve in a support role as skirmishers or sharpshooters. In order to enlist in one of Berdan's companies a soldier had to demonstrate his proficiency with a rifle by passing a rigorous shooting exam. The test posed to the men of the Second Company of Minnesota Sharpshooters consisted of placing 10 consecutive shots within a target 20 inches in diameter at a range of 200 yards. Once they mustered in, the men received extensive training in skirmish formations and marksmanship which far exceeded that of a standard infantry soldier. The army outfitted these sharpshooters in a distinctive green uniform with gutta-percha buttons which helped to camouflage the marksman. The men carried out their deadly work with the help of the Sharps .52 caliber rifle. This rifle represented the top of the line in weapons development at the start of the American Civil War. As a breechloader, the rifle could be reloaded much faster than the standard muzzle loader, expanding the rate of fire of a single soldier from three rounds per minute to up to 10 rounds in the same time frame. Berdan's Sharpshooters served with the eastern theatre's Army of the Potomac throughout the course of the war.

=== Actions during the Civil War ===
The 2nd Minnesota Sharpshooters Company, raised in January 1862 found most of its recruits in Rice and Steele Counties. The unit's commanding officer, Captain William Russell, sent out non-commissioned officers from various communities to test recruits, including Corporal C.R. Eldridge of Northfield, Minnesota. Following the marksmanship exam, a total of eight Northfielders made it on to the company's roster of 100 men and three commissioned officers. That April, after receiving their basic training at Fort Snelling, the men of the 2nd Company boarded a train for Washington DC. On May 3, 1862, the men departed Washington to join the 1st United States Sharpshooters Regiment as Company I. The Army of the Potomac had launched the Peninsula Campaign and made its way to Yorktown, Virginia, when the Second Company reported to Colonel Berdan at Camp Winfield Scott. While stationed with the rest of the 1st United States Sharpshooters Regiment the Second Company received advanced training in skirmish formations before seeing its first action at Hanover Court House on May 27. On May 30, the men of the Second Company received orders to detach from the 1st United States Sharpshooters Regiment and meet up with the 1st Minnesota Infantry Regiment. They joined the First Minnesota on June 1, in time to participate with the regiment at the Battle of Fair Oakes (Seven Pines). As the 11th company of the First Minnesota, the sharpshooters received the title of “Company L” and would remain assigned to the First Minnesota until November 23, 1863.

Company L fought through the remainder of the Peninsula campaign alongside the 1st Minnesota Infantry, retreating following the Union defeat in the Seven Days Battles. The next major engagement for the unit came at the Battle of Antietam on September 17, 1862. A tactical blunder exposed the regiment's flanks at a position known as “the West Woods.” As a result, the opposing Confederates under the command of Thomas “Stonewall” Jackson released a three-sided torrent of fire against the men of Company L. The walls of lead cut down roughly half the men of the company resulting in a casualty list which included four of the eight Northfielders. Following the Confederate withdrawal from Maryland, the 1st Minnesota Infantry played minor roles in the Battles of Fredericksburg and Chancellorsville in the winter of 1862 and the spring of 1863. However, the unit's greatest test would come in General Robert E. Lee’s second invasion of the North, at Gettysburg, Pennsylvania.

As Lee's Army of Northern Virginia invaded Pennsylvania, George G. Meade, newly appointed commander of the Army of the Potomac quickly followed in order to prevent any assault on Philadelphia or Washington. When the two armies collided at Gettysburg, Company L and the rest of the 1st Minnesota Infantry was assigned to Major General Winfield Scott Hancock’s II Corps. The regiment did not engage until the second day of the battle when Company L detached as skirmishers and the balance of the force made the 1st Minnesota Infantry's famous charge which prevented Confederate forces from splitting the Union center. The entire 1st Minnesota Infantry helped to repulse Pickett's Charge on the third day of the battle and secure a Union victory.

Company L remained formally attached to the 1st Minnesota Infantry until November 1863 when they were reassigned as an independent unit to the 1st Brigade, 2nd Division, 2nd Army Corps, Army of the Potomac, the same brigade which they had been serving in while attached to the 1st Minnesota Infantry. The company continued to serve even after the expiration of the 1st Minnesota Infantry's term in May 1864, fighting in the battles at the Wilderness, Spotsylvania Court House, Cold Harbor, and Petersburg. The company's term expired on March 19, 1865, and the unit disbanded. Veterans whose terms had not expired transferred to the 1st Minnesota Infantry Battalion, the successor unit to the original 1st Minnesota Infantry. Some men of the Sharpshooters were also transferred to the 1st Minnesota Heavy Artillery Regiment. Following Lee's surrender on April 9, 1865, the 1st Minnesota Infantry Battalion took part in the Grand Review of the Army of the Potomac in Washington DC and mustered out in Louisville, Kentucky, on July 15, 1865.

== Commanders ==
- William F. Russell: Russell was the original commander of the 2nd Minnesota Sharpshooters Company until his resignation on February 20, 1863.
- Emil A. Bürger (Burger/ Berger): Originally a 1st Lieutenant, Bürger was the second commander of the 2nd Minnesota Sharpshooters Company after the resignation of Captain Russell from February 20, 1863 until November 23, 1863. He was captured at Savage station but was quickly paroled. He later served as the sutler of the 1st Minnesota Heavy Artillery Regiment.
- Mahlon Black: Originally the First sergeant of the company, Black was the third and final commander of the 2nd Minnesota Sharpshooters Company after Captain Bürger's resignation on November 23, 1863. Black commanded the company until it was mustered out in 1864, Black reenlisted in the 1st Minnesota Infantry Battalion. Black was born in Hamilton County, Ohio, when he enlisted his residency was Stillwater, Minnesota in the company's roster. Before the war Black was part of the Minnesota Territorial Legislature and worked as a surveyor and logger. After the war he served as the county auditor of Hennepin County. Black's younger brother Foster Black was the Quartermaster Sergeant of Company E, 54th Ohio Infantry Regiment.

== Nicknames ==
According to the List of Synonyms of the Organizations in the Volunteer Service of the United States, during the 2nd Minnesota Sharpshooter's service the unit had three different monikers, each relating to the company commander at the time. Theses company nicknames were:

- Russell's (William F.) Company Sharpshooters.
- Bürger's (Emil A.) Company Sharpshooters.
- Black's (Mahlon) Company Sharpshooters.

The unit was also briefly known as the "Provost Guard, 2nd Division, 2nd Army Corps, Army of the Potomac".

== Notable people ==
- Halvor Halvorson Quie: an early Norwegian settler-colonist and immigrant in Wheeling Township, Rice County, Minnesota. Quie, an abolitionist, served in the 1st United States Sharpshooters in the 2nd Minnesota Company along with his neighbors and cousins who he helped to recruit. Quie was badly wounded in the heel at the Battle of Antietam and was discharged for disability.
- Mahlon T. Black: Minnesota Territorial Legislator, mayor, and postmaster of Stillwater, Minnesota.
- Gad Merrill Dwelle: Originally enlisted as a Corporal from Lake City, Minnesota, Dwelle was later commissioned as a Second lieutenant in 1864. Dwelle later served in the 3rd Minnesota Light Artillery Battery.
