= Mahlon Black =

American politician

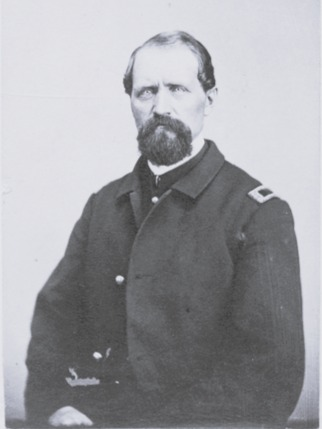
- Black c. 1862 by Joel Emmons Whitney

Member of the Minnesota Territorial Legislature from the 2nd District
- In office September 3, 1849 – December 31, 1850

Member of the Minnesota Territorial Legislature from the 1st District
- In office January 7, 1852 – January 4, 1853

Personal details
- Born: October 4, 1820 Hamilton County, Ohio, U.S.
- Died: October 25, 1901 (aged 81) Minneapolis, Minnesota, U.S.
- Resting place: Oak Hill Cemetery; Minneapolis, Minnesota, U.S.

Military service
- Allegiance: United States of America
- Branch/service: Union Army
- Rank: Captain
- Unit: 2nd Minnesota Sharpshooters Company
- Battles/wars: American Civil War

Mahlon Black (October 4, 1820 – October 25, 1901) was an American politician and soldier.

Black was born in Hamilton County, Ohio. Black served in the House of Representatives of the 1st Minnesota Territorial Legislature in 1849, the 3rd Minnesota Territorial Legislature in 1852, and the 8th Minnesota Territorial Legislature in 1857. Following his time in the statehouse, he was postmaster in Stillwater, Minnesota from 1857 to 1861, and mayor between 1860 and 1861.

During the Civil War, he served in the 2nd Company of Minnesota Sharpshooters.
