= Delano T. Smith =

American politician

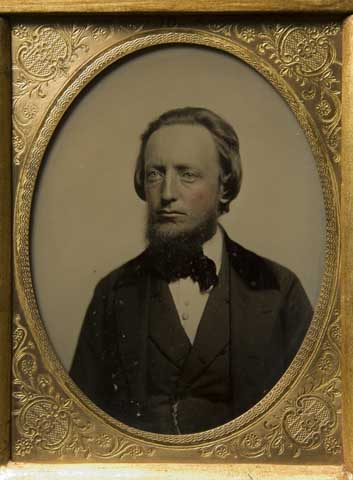
- Smith c. 1858

Member of the Minnesota Senate from the 4th District
- In office December 2, 1857 – December 6, 1859
- Preceded by: Position established
- Succeeded by: Riley Bartholomew

Member of the Minnesota Territorial House of Representatives from the 11th District
- In office January 7, 1857 – December 1, 1857

Personal details
- Born: November 6, 1830 Litchfield, New York, U.S.
- Died: May 10, 1905 (aged 74) Marshalltown, Iowa, U.S.

Delano Thomas Smith (November 6, 1830 – May 10, 1905) was an American lawyer, businessman, politician, and cattle farmer who served in both the Minnesota Territorial Legislature and the Minnesota Legislature.

== Early life and education ==
Smith was born on November 6, 1830, in Litchfield, New York. Smith was educated at the Clinton Liberal Institute by Thomas Jefferson Sawyer before working as a law clerk for James Cosslett Smith, later the Judge of the New York Supreme Court. Smith was admitted to the bar exam in Albany, New York in 1852 before moving to Dixon, Illinois where he practiced law.

Smith moved to Minnesota Territory between 1855 and 1856 and settled in Minneapolis near St. Anthony, Minnesota.^{:47}

== Political career ==
=== Minnesota Territorial House ===
Smith began his political career in 1856 when he was elected as a representative of the city of Minneapolis' western District 11 of the Minnesota Territorial House of Representatives.^{:101} At the time the district included Hennepin County, Carver County, and Davis County. Smith would serve in the 8th Minnesota Territorial Legislature from January 7, 1857, to December 1, 1857, as a member of the Republican Party of Minnesota. During his term Smith was the chairman of the legislative expenditures committee and was a member of the printing committee.

=== Minnesota Senate ===
Smith was later elected to serve in the Minnesota Senate on October 13, 1857, representing Minnesota's 4th Senate district along with Erastus Newton Bates. Smith would serve from December 2, 1857, to December 6, 1859. During his term Smith was a member of the towns and counties committee and the Minnesota state library committee.

=== United States Treasury ===
In 1863 during the American Civil War Smith was appointed by President of the United States Abraham Lincoln as a tax commissioner for the state of Tennessee as part of the United States Department of the Treasury. Smith served in this capacity until his resignation in 1865.

== Later life ==
Smith's Highland Home stock farm in Marshalltown (bottom)

Following his political career Smith moved back to New York where he worked in the field of real estate with his brother, Melville C. Smith, and assisted in the building of the Arcade and Attica Railroad. Smith later moved to Marshalltown, Iowa where he continued to work as a lawyer. Smith was later involved in the breeding of various cattle and owned a large cattle ranch in Marshalltown.

Smith died on May 10, 1905, in Marshalltown.

== Personal life ==
Smith was married three times during his life. Smith was first married to Mary E. Cook on May 20, 1832, in Springville, New York. Smith's second wife was Mettia A. Palmer whom he married on June 26, 1862, in Utica, New York. Smith's third wife was Julia V. Watson whom he married on September 17, 1885, in Springfield, Illinois. Between his three spouses Smith had seven children.

Smith was the brother of Minnesota representative Melville C. Smith.
