= Quie (surname) =

Quie is a surname. Notable people with the surname include:

- Al Quie (1923–2023), American politician and farmer
- Gretchen Quie (1927–2015), American artist and First Lady of Minnesota
- Halvor Halvorson Quie (1834–1919), Norwegian-born American Civil War veteran

== See also ==
- Quié, is a commune in France.
