= Aurilla Furber =

American writer

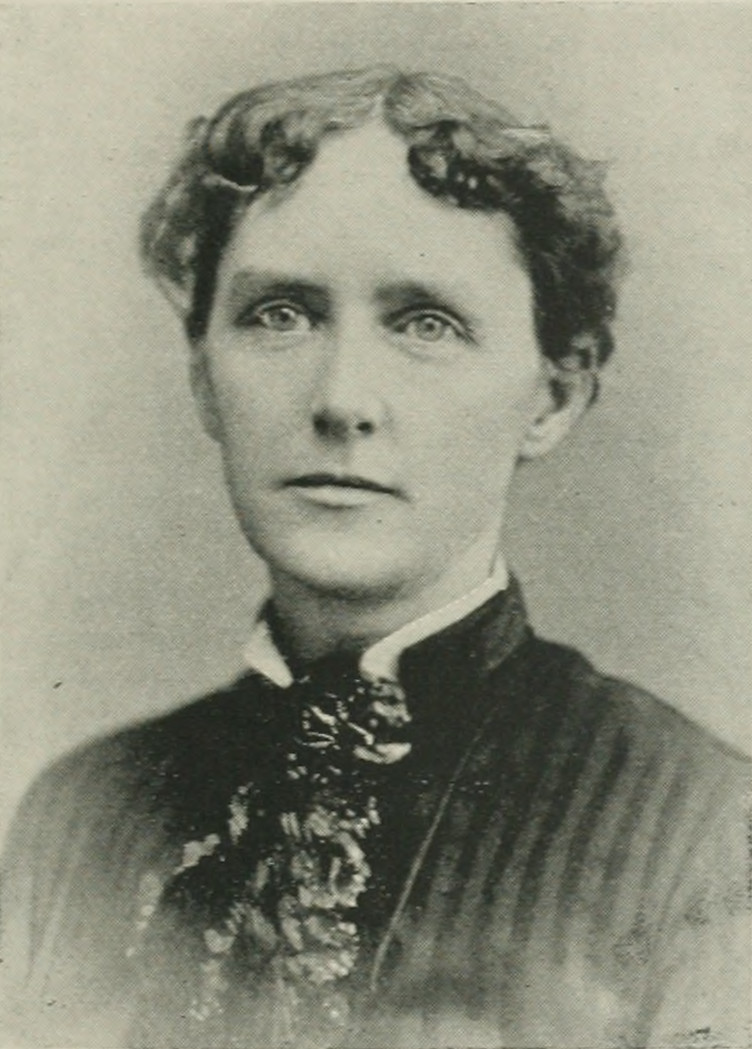
- Photo in A Woman of the Century
- Born: October 19, 1847; Cottage Grove, Minnesota, U.S.
- Died: April 13, 1898 (aged 50)
- Resting place: Cottage Grove Cemetery
- Occupations: writer, editor, temperance activist
- Parent: Joseph W. Furber (father)
- Relatives: Pierce P. Furber (cousin)
- Writing career
- Language: English

Aurilla Furber (October 19, 1847 – April 13, 1898) was a 19th-century American author, editor, and activist from Minnesota. She is remembered as an author of poetry from the Mississippi Valley. Her poems were included in publications such as the Magazine of Poetry and Women in Sacred Song. She also contributed prose articles for the Pioneer Press and Church Work, and was a contributing editor for the Woman's Record. Furber was an officer in the Woman's Christian Temperance Union's (WCTU) local, county and district organizations.

== Early life and education ==
Aurilla Furber was born in a log cabin in Cottage Grove, Minnesota, October 19, 1847. Her father was Joseph Warren Furber, who was well known among the pioneers and founders of the Minnesota Territory, served in its legislature as well as several of the early Minnesota State legislatures. Her mother, Sarah Maria Minkler Furber (1816–1901), descended from the Minklers and Showermans of eastern New York, who were of Holland Dutch ancestry. However, the families had lived in the United States for several generations. The Furbers were English. Her great-grandfather, General Richard Furber, of New Hampshire, served in the American Revolutionary War, and her grandfather, Major Pierce P. Furber, in the War of 1812.

She spent most of her life in a small country village, a product of frontier life, in a farming community. She received her education in a log schoolhouse. None of her school-day poems appear in print, and it is doubtful that she wrote much in her youth.

== Career ==
After leaving school, Furber became a pioneer school teacher, but severe illness incapacitated her teaching career. Although unable to participate in common activities, she found a way of her own during her periods of inactivity.

Developing an interest in poetry, she wrote verse for many years, the poems reflecting her life. Her work was finished in a technical sense, and telling in a poetical sense. However, Furber was not, in a broad sense of the term, a scholar. Her limited opportunities for schooling in youth and her continued ill-health in later years made it impossible for her to become well-educated. Her verse was described as "telling the story of a soul that had not trodden dusty, common highways, but was alone in the sunlight and darkness with itself, nature and God." Selections from her poems were included in the Magazine of Poetryand Women in Sacred Song. Her poem "Together" was set to music by Richard Stahl.

She wrote prose articles for the Pioneer Press, Church Work and other papers, and was one of the contributing editors of the Woman's Record, at one time the organ of the Woman's Educational and Industrial Union of St. Paul.

Furber was identified with WCTU work for years as an officer in local, county and district organizations. She wrote the Union-Signal suggesting that the motto of the WCTU be changed from "For God and Home and Native Land" to "For God and Home and Land we Lore," alleging as a reason that foreign-born citizens were sensitive in regard to the wording of the motto at it stood, and saying that it made them feel like aliens. The WCTU reported in 1891 that as result of a study made by Furber, it led to the following: that while in Minnesota, the father could will away from the mother the care of their newborn child's estate, he could not take from her the care of its person or its education. Furber wrote the words for "Roll on, temperance tide", set to music by Edwin Moore.

== Personal life ==
After 1885, she made her home in Saint Paul, Minnesota. To a friend who asked for a list of her ten favorite novels she answered, "I don't believe I've ever read so many," but afterward gave George Eliot as her favorite novelist and Sidney Lanier as her favorite poet. Her favorite hero was Paul the Apostle, and her chief ambition was, "To do the best I can with what I have." Furber died April 13, 1898, and is buried in the Cottage Grove Cemetery.

== Style and themes ==
Among the many poets of the Mississippi Valley, Furber was considered unique, her poems exhibiting an old-English character, only noticeable in such late English poets as Jean Ingelow and Christina Rossetti, while the work of most women-poets of the time was modeled, consciously or unconsciously, on that of Elizabeth Barrett Browning. Furber possessed none of Browning's characteristics, unless it was her boldness and utter disregard of convention. She is known for the poetical quotation, "The shy, fine fragrance of the blooms of May."

== Selected works ==
- 1894, Night Wind
- 1894, Herald's of Day
- 1892, Greeting
- 1893, Christmas
