= Andyville, Minnesota =

- Unincorporated community
- Location within Minnesota Location within the United States
- Coordinates: 43°43′26″N 92°59′23″W
- Country: United States
- State: Minnesota
- County: Mower
- Township: Lansing
- Elevation: 1,243 ft (379 m)
- Time zone: UTC-6 (Central (CST))
  - Summer (DST): UTC-5 (CDT)
- Area code: 507
- GNIS feature ID: 639369

Andyville is an unincorporated community in Mower County, Minnesota, United States.
