= Chase Brook (Minnesota) =

Stream in Mille Lacs County, Minnesota, U.S.

Coordinates: 45°46′01″N 93°39′42″W

Chase Brook is a stream in Mille Lacs County, in the U.S. state of Minnesota.

Chase Brook was named for Jonathan N. Chase, a businessperson in the lumber industry.

== See also ==
- List of rivers of Minnesota
