= Ramsey, Mower County, Minnesota =

Ramsey, Minnesota
- Unincorporated community
- Location within Minnesota Location within the United States
- Coordinates: 43°42′35″N 92°58′11″W
- Country: United States
- State: Minnesota
- County: Mower
- Township: Lansing
- Elevation: 1,217 ft (371 m)
- Time zone: UTC-6 (Central (CST))
  - Summer (DST): UTC-5 (CDT)
- Area code: 507
- GNIS feature ID: 649803

Ramsey is an unincorporated community in Lansing Township, Mower County, Minnesota, United States.

A post office called Ramsey was established in 1874, and closed in 1875. The community was named for Alexander Ramsey, 1st Governor of Minnesota Territory.
