= Jack Rollins =

Jack Rollins may refer to:

- Jack Rollins (producer) (1915–2015), long-time producer of Woody Allen's films
- Walter E. Rollins (1906–1973), American songwriter, nicknamed "Jack"

== Fictional characters ==
- Jack Rollins (Marvel Cinematic Universe), a character in the Marvel Cinematic Universe franchise

== See also ==
- John Rollins (disambiguation)
