= Fort Ridgely and South Pass Wagon Road =

The Fort Ridgely and South Pass Wagon Road (also known as Nobles Trail) was a wagon trail that was intended to connect Fort Ridgely in Minnesota Territory (now Minnesota) with South Pass in the Rocky Mountains of Nebraska Territory (now Wyoming). It was designed to link St. Paul with California via the Oregon Trail, however only a portion of the route was completed. The trail was promoted and supervised by William H. Nobles. Appropriations for the trail were authorized by the U.S. Congress on July 22, 1856. It was the first road built in Dakota Territory.

The Fort Ridgely Road began in southwest Minnesota near present-day New Ulm and entered the Dakota Territory near Lake Benton. It crossed the Big Sioux River near Lake Campbell, continued south of Lake Thompson, and crossed the James River near present-day Forestburg before continuing on to the Missouri River south of Fort Lookout (near present-day Chamberlain). Only this portion, roughly 254 miles long, was built. From the Missouri, the trail was to have followed the White River across western Dakota Territory, entering Nebraska Territory south of the Badlands, and continuing west to South Pass.
