= Mapleview, Minnesota =

City in Minnesota, United States

- City
- Location in Mower County and the state of Minnesota
- Coordinates: 43°41′24″N 92°58′26″W
- Country: United States
- State: Minnesota
- County: Mower

Area
  - Total: 0.19 sq mi (0.48 km^{2})
  - Land: 0.19 sq mi (0.48 km^{2})
  - Water: 0 sq mi (0.00 km^{2})
- Elevation: 1,198 ft (365 m)

Population (2020)
  - Total: 144
  - Density: 777.2/sq mi (300.06/km^{2})
- Time zone: UTC-6 (Central (CST))
  - Summer (DST): UTC-5 (CDT)
- ZIP Code: 55912
- Area code: 507
- FIPS code: 27-40346
- GNIS feature ID: 2395845

Mapleview is a city in Lansing Township, Mower County, Minnesota, United States. It is a suburb of Austin, the county seat. The population was 144 at the 2020 census, down from 176 in 2010. It was named for a row of maple trees that once stood on the west side of town.

== History ==
The village of Mapleview was incorporated in 1945 to provide facilities for approximately 100 families. In 1948, a plot of land north of town was purchased, where the liquor store, fire station, water tower, pump house and equipment garages were eventually built. In 1954, the city bought 4 acres (1.6 ha) along Murphy Creek, and this became Hillside Park. The fire house was built in 1958 and has over 30 volunteer fire fighters, with Michael Langstaff as the Fire Chief of the Mapleview Fire Department. Natural gas was made available to residents in 1962. Until its disbanding in 2013, Mapleview and the city of Lyle shared a police department, with police commission of a commissioner and two city council members from each city.

== Geography ==
Mapleview is in western Mower County and is bordered to the south, east, and west, by the city of Austin. Oakwood Cemetery is directly south of the Mapleview/Austin border, while Austin's Wildwood Park is to the southeast. The Cedar River passes through the easternmost part of Mapleview, and its tributary Murphy Creek crosses the western part of the city.

According to the U.S. Census Bureau, Mapleview has a total area of 0.18 square miles (0.47 km^{2}), all of it recorded as land. Via the Cedar River, Mapleview is part of the Iowa River watershed.

County 45 serves as a main route in the community. Interstate Highway 90 passes half a mile south of the city limits, and U.S. Highway 218 is less than a mile to the west.

== Demographics ==
Historical population
Census	Pop.	Note	%±
1950	435		—
1960	381		−12.4%
1970	328		−13.9%
1980	253		−22.9%
1990	206		−18.6%
2000	189		−8.3%
2010	176		−6.9%
2020	144		−18.2%
U.S. Decennial Census

=== 2010 census ===
As of the census of 2010, there were 176 people, 83 households, and 44 families residing in the city. The population density was 977.8 inhabitants per square mile (377.5/km^{2}). There were 93 housing units at an average density of 516.7 per square mile (199.5/km^{2}). The racial makeup of the city was 90.3% White, 1.7% Asian, 5.7% from other races, and 2.3% from two or more races. Hispanic or Latino of any race were 14.2% of the population.

There were 83 households, of which 22.9% had children under the age of 18 living with them, 33.7% were married couples living together, 9.6% had a female householder with no husband present, 9.6% had a male householder with no wife present, and 47.0% were non-families. 34.9% of all households were made up of individuals, and 7.2% had someone living alone who was 65 years of age or older. The average household size was 2.12 and the average family size was 2.64.

The median age in the city was 46.5 years. 15.9% of residents were under the age of 18; 12.5% were between the ages of 18 and 24; 19.8% were from 25 to 44; 36.5% were from 45 to 64; and 15.3% were 65 years of age or older. The gender makeup of the city was 54.5% male and 45.5% female.

=== 2000 census ===
As of the census of 2000, there were 189 people, 88 households, and 51 families residing in the city. The population density was 1,010.9 inhabitants per square mile (390.3/km^{2}). There were 96 housing units at an average density of 513.5 per square mile (198.3/km^{2}). The racial makeup of the city was 92.59% White, 3.17% Asian, 2.12% from other races, and 2.12% from two or more races. Hispanic or Latino of any race were 6.35% of the population.

There were 88 households, out of which 22.7% had children under the age of 18 living with them, 40.9% were married couples living together, 8.0% had a female householder with no husband present, and 42.0% were non-families. 35.2% of all households were made up of individuals, and 11.4% had someone living alone who was 65 years of age or older. The average household size was 2.15 and the average family size was 2.63.

In the city, the population was spread out, with 20.6% under the age of 18, 7.4% from 18 to 24, 30.2% from 25 to 44, 25.4% from 45 to 64, and 16.4% who were 65 years of age or older. The median age was 40 years. For every 100 females, there were 110.0 males. For every 100 females age 18 and over, there were 114.3 males.

The median income for a household in the city was $30,909, and the median income for a family was $30,625. Males had a median income of $29,000 versus $20,833 for females. The per capita income for the city was $16,884. About 4.5% of families and 12.8% of the population were below the poverty line, including none of those under the age of eighteen and 20.7% of those 65 or over.
