= Martin McLeod =

Fur trader and legislator in Minnesota

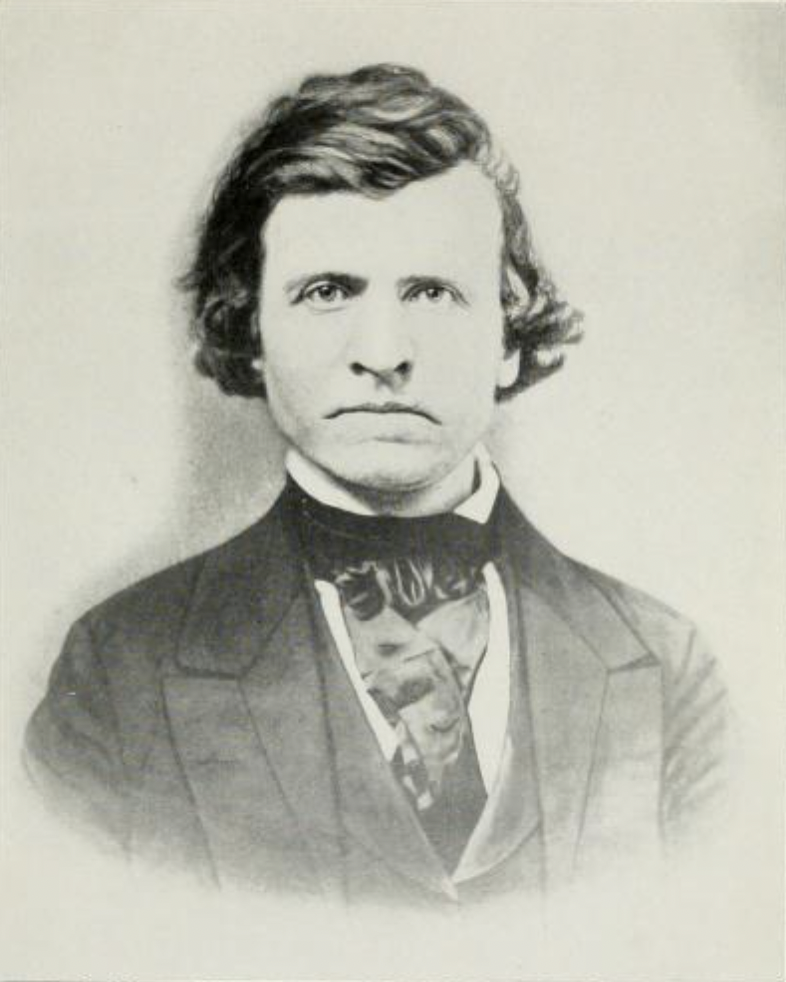
- Portrait of McLeod

Member of the Minnesota Territorial Legislature
- In office September 3, 1849 – January 3, 1854
- Governor: Alexander Ramsey; Willis A. Gorman

Personal details
- Born: April 13, 1813 Montréal, Québec, Lower Canada
- Died: November 20, 1860 (aged 47) Bloomington, Minnesota, U.S.
- Resting place: Bloomington Cemetery, Bloomington, Minnesota, U.S.

Martin McLeod (April 13, 1813 – November 20, 1860) was an American fur trader, pioneer, and territorial legislator in Minnesota. McLeod County, Minnesota was named in his honor.

== Early life ==
McLeod was born in Montreal, Quebec in Canada (then part of Lower Canada) to Scottish Canadian parents. Initially McLeod worked as a clerk in Montreal during the North American fur trade before moving to the Red River Colony (also called the Selkirk Settlement). In early March of 1837 McLeod, along with two British Army officers consisting of Captain Pays and Jack Hays, and a Métis guide Pierre Bottineau eventually traveled from Fort Garry to Fort Snelling in Wisconsin Territory during the winter of 1837. McLeod and Bottineau were the only two survivors of the party on the trek to Fort Snelling, both Captain Pays and Hays had died from the elements near the Cheyenne River, likely from a combination of frostbite and hypothermia. McLeod and Bottineau eventually arrived at the trading post of Joseph R. Brown at Lake Traverse on March 21, 1837.

== Minnesota Territory ==
McLeod eventually worked as a trader for the American Fur Company, overseeing trade with the Sisseton and Wahpeton bands in Wisconsin Territory. McLeod served in the Minnesota Territorial Legislature from 1849 to 1851 and from 1852 to 1853 during the 1st Minnesota Territorial Legislature, the 2nd Minnesota Territorial Legislature, the 3rd Minnesota Territorial Legislature, and the 4th Minnesota Territorial Legislature where he was president of the Territorial Council. McLeod served as president of the territorial council. He also served as chairman of the town of Bloomington, Minnesota Territory and as a commissioner for Hennepin County, Minnesota. McLeod was later a significant figure behind the signing of both the Treaty of Mendota and later the Treaty of Traverse des Sioux.

== Personal life ==
McLeod married Mary Elizabeth Ortley in 1837 or 1838. The couple had five children, Walter Scott (b. 1841), John (b. 1843), Mary Elizabeth (b. 1844), Janet (b. 1848), and Isabella (b. 1851). McLeod died on November 20, 1860 and was initially buried on his family plot in Glencoe. His body was later interred in Bloomington Cemetery.

== Legacy ==
McLeod County, Minnesota which was first established on March 1, 1856 was named in honor of McLeod. In 1855 McLeod, along with John H. Stevens were two of the founding citizens of the city of Glencoe, Minnesota, the county seat of McLeod county. Glencoe township received its name on July 11, 1855, the city was named by McLeod in honor of the Massacre of Glencoe in 1692 in Scotland.
