= Alanson B. Vaughan =

American politician

Alanson B. Vaughan (June 6, 1806, in Clinton County, New York – October 3, 1876) was a member of the Wisconsin State Assembly and the Minnesota Territorial Legislature. He settled in what would become Rock County, Wisconsin in 1843. He later worked as a merchant in Lansing Township, Mower County, Minnesota. The town was in part named after Vaughan, because of the similarity to the sound of his first name. He was a member of the Assembly during the 1848 session as a Whig. From 1856 to 1857, he was a member of the House of Representatives of the Territorial Legislature as a Republican. Additionally, he was Postmaster of Lansing.
