= Chase Lake (Itasca County, Minnesota) =

Lake in the state of Minnesota, United States

- Location within Minnesota
- Location: Itasca County, Minnesota
- Coordinates: 47°21′59″N 93°44′26″W
- Type: Lake
- Surface elevation: 1,319 feet (402 m)

Chase Lake is a lake in Itasca County, in the U.S. state of Minnesota.

Chase Lake was named for Jonathan N. Chase, a businessperson in the lumber industry.

== See also ==
- List of lakes in Minnesota
