= Lansing Township, Mower County, Minnesota =

Lansing Township, Minnesota
- Township
- Location within Minnesota
- Coordinates: 43°43′30″N 92°59′15″W
- Country: United States
- State: Minnesota
- County: Mower

Area
  - Total: 83.8 km^{2} (32.34 sq mi)
  - Land: 83.5 km^{2} (32.25 sq mi)
  - Water: 0.23 km^{2} (0.09 sq mi)

Population (2000)
  - Total: 1,292
  - Density: 15.47/km^{2} (40.06/sq mi)
- FIPS code: 27-35576
- GNIS feature ID: 0664726
- Website: https://www.lansingtownshipmn.org/

Lansing Township is a township in Mower County, Minnesota, United States. The population was 1,292 at the 2000 census. The largest city contained partially within the township is Austin with 23,314 people. The southern part of Austin is in Austin Township. Lansing Township also contains the town of Mapleview (population 189) and the unincorporated areas of Ramsey, Corning, and Lansing.

== History ==
Lansing Township was organized in 1858, and named after Lansing, Michigan and as a tribute to Alanson B. Vaughan.

== Geography ==
According to the United States Census Bureau, the township has a total area of 32.3 square miles (84 km^{2}), of which 32.2 square miles (83 km^{2}) is land and 0.1 square miles (0.26 km^{2}) (0.28%) is water.

== Demographics ==
As of the census of 2000, there were 1,292 people, 488 households, and 374 families residing in the township. The population density was 40.1 inhabitants per square mile (15.5/km^{2}). There were 514 housing units at an average density of 15.9/sq mi (6.2/km^{2}). The racial makeup of the township was 97.29% White, 0.70% African American, 0.15% Native American, 0.31% Asian, 0.62% from other races, and 0.93% from two or more races. Hispanic or Latino of any race were 1.47% of the population.

There were 488 households, out of which 28.5% had children under the age of 18 living with them, 67.0% were married couples living together, 6.8% had a female householder with no husband present, and 23.2% were non-families. 17.0% of all households were made up of individuals, and 8.8% had someone living alone who was 65 years of age or older. The average household size was 2.58 and the average family size was 2.89.

In the township the population was spread out, with 25.7% under the age of 18, 7.2% from 18 to 24, 24.5% from 25 to 44, 26.5% from 45 to 64, and 16.0% who were 65 years of age or older. The median age was 40 years. For every 100 females, there were 106.4 males. For every 100 females age 18 and over, there were 104.3 males.

The median income for a household in the township was $39,911, and the median income for a family was $44,444. Males had a median income of $32,344 versus $25,750 for females. The per capita income for the township was $17,301. About 9.7% of families and 12.2% of the population were below the poverty line, including 14.2% of those under age 18 and 7.1% of those age 65 or over.

== Communities ==
=== Alderson's Mill ===
Simon and Sophia Alderson moved to Austin in 1866 from Council Hills Station, Illinois. In 1867 Simon built a flour mill containing just one run of buhr stones on the Cedar River. It was located on Water Street, the street that is now 4th St. NE in Austin. The Hormel company bought the mill in 1915 and used it to produce Hormel Minnesota Peerless flour. The mill burned to the ground in January, 1967.

=== Andyville ===
Andyville is an unincorporated community on U.S. Route 218, approximately three miles north of Austin.

=== Ramsey ===
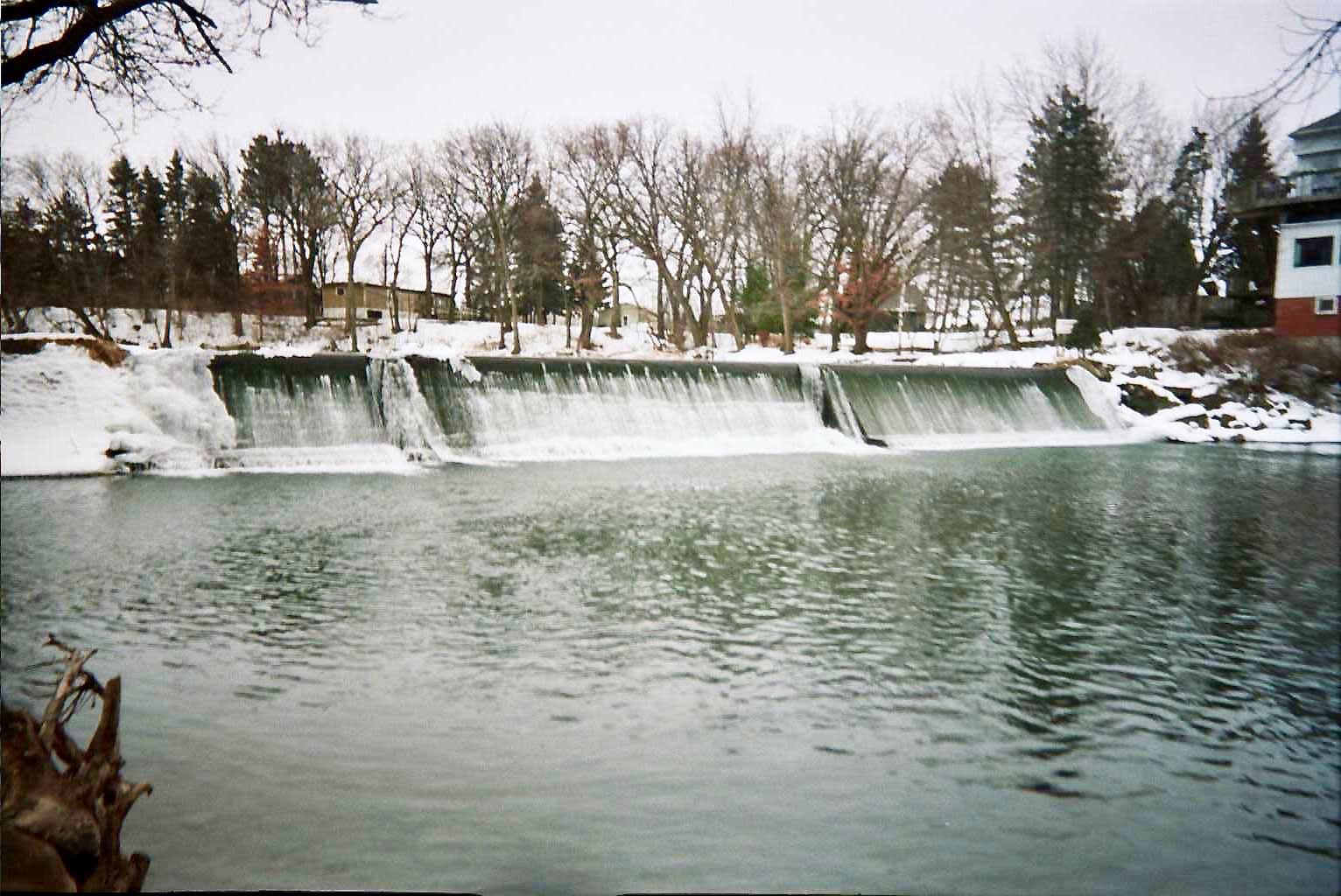
The dam which forms the Ramsey Mill Pond, part of the Cedar River

Platted in 1873, Ramsey is an unincorporated community about a mile northeast of Austin near the Ramsey Golf Course. It was at the junction of two railroads and at one time a stagecoach service operated between Austin and the small community. Gregson's Mill was located on the Cedar River and Ramsey's other main attraction, "The Old Mill" restaurant, is named to honor this time in the community's past. Ramsey Golf Course lies north of Ramsey Mill Pond. A dam was built for this pond and the old mill which used to be there. The old millstone can be found embedded in the fireplace of the course's clubhouse.

== Cemeteries ==
- Lansing Cemetery is located on the northern side of the northwest quadrant of section 11 of the township. It is directly south of Mower County Highway 2. Its oldest known burial dates to 1859.

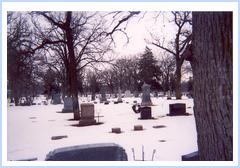
Oakwood Cemetery in Austin.

- Oakwood Cemetery is located in section 34 of the township, directly across from the Holiday Inn in Austin. It is bounded on the south by Interstate 90 and on the north by the town of Mapleview. With over 10,000 burials, it is the largest cemetery in Mower County. At one time it was three separate cemeteries. The northernmost was Cedar Cemetery and the southernmost Baudler Cemetery, with Old Oakwood Cemetery between them. Many of the poems contained in Richard Eberhart's 1947 work Burr Oaks were influenced by the area around this bur oak-filled cemetery.
