= St. Andre Durand Balcombe =

American newspaper editor, politician and Indian agent (1829–1904)

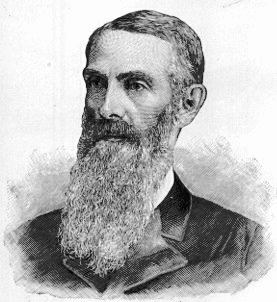
Engraving of St. A. D. Balcombe, 1880s

Saint Andre Durand Balcombe (1829–1904) was a newspaper editor, Indian agent and Republican politician who served in the Minnesota Legislature.

== Life and career ==
Balcombe was born June 12, 1829, in Utica, New York. His family later relocated to Winona, Minnesota, and, after spending brief periods working in Battle Creek, Michigan, and Elgin, Illinois, Balcombe settled in Winona as well. In 1856 and 1857 he was elected to the 7th and 8th Minnesota Territorial Legislatures as a Republican. During the combative Minnesota Constitutional Convention in 1857, Balcombe was the president of the Republican faction's convention. After Minnesota achieved statehood, he also served in the 1st Minnesota Legislature as well as on the Board of Regents for the University of Minnesota.

In 1861, he was named Indian Agent for the Winnebago (now known as the Ho-Chunk) in Minnesota by President Abraham Lincoln. He was re-appointed in 1865 as agent for the Dakota Territory, but was later removed from office over a political disagreement with President Andrew Johnson.

Balcombe relocated to Omaha, Nebraska, in 1865 and shortly thereafter purchased the Omaha Republican newspaper. Balcombe was engaged in close rivalries with the city's other newspapers. When the Omaha Daily Herald attempted to secretly begin publishing a morning edition in 1867, Balcombe was tipped off and hurriedly published a morning edition of the Republican as well. In 1873 he published an editorial critical of the rival Omaha Daily Bee editor Edward Rosewater. An angry Rosewater confronted Balcombe with a whip on the street, but was overpowered, disarmed and sat upon by the larger Balcombe. The Republican was later merged into a holding company which Balcombe was a shareholder of. In 1876 he divested himself from the business completely.

Balcombe later played a role in the arrest and trial of Jack McCall for the murder of Wild Bill Hickok. In 1876 he was named a deputy United States Marshal for the Wyoming Territory. On August 29, 1876, he overheard McCall bragging about the crime in Laramie, Wyoming, and arrested him. McCall was later tried for the murder in Yankton, South Dakota, convicted, and sentenced to death.

== Later life and death ==
Later in his life, Balcombe remained involved in Omaha politics and business. He served on the founding board of directors for the Omaha Public Library and the city's Board of Public Works among other positions. He died May 7, 1904, and was buried in Forest Lawn Cemetery in Omaha.
