= Michael E. Ames =

American politician (1822–1861)

2nd Speaker of the Minnesota Territory House of Representatives
- In office 1851–1852
- Preceded by: Joseph W. Furber
- Succeeded by: John D. Ludden

Personal details
- Born: 1822
- Died: 1861 (aged 38–39)
- Party: Democratic

Michael E. Ames (1822–1861) was a politician from Minnesota Territory, a member of the Democratic Party, and a member of the Minnesota Territory House of Representatives, representing St. Paul, Minnesota. Furber served as Speaker of the Minnesota Territory House of Representatives in 1851.

Ames served as a delegate to Minnesota's Democratic Constitutional Convention in 1857.

Political offices
Preceded by Joseph W. Furber	Speaker of the Minnesota Territory House of Representatives; 1851–1852	Succeeded by John D. Ludden
