= Lorenzo A. Babcock =

American politician (1820–1860)

Lorenzo Allen Babcock
- Born: June 15, 1820; Berkshire, Vermont, U.S.
- Died: April 2, 1860 (aged 39)
- Occupations: Attorney, Politician
- Known for: First Attorney General of Minnesota Territory
- Political party: Whig (before mid-1850s); Republican (mid-1850s onwards)

Lorenzo Allen Babcock (June 15, 1820 – April 2, 1860) was an American attorney and politician. He was most notable for his service as the first attorney general of Minnesota Territory, a position he held from 1849 to 1853.

Born in Berkshire, Vermont, Babcock was a son of Elias Babcock and Clara (Olmstead) Babcock. Among his siblings was Orville E. Babcock.

Babcock studied law and became an attorney. A Whig, he served in the Minnesota Territorial House of Representatives in 1849 and on the Minnesota Territorial Council from 1852 to 1853. In 1849 he was appointed territorial attorney general, and he served until 1853. He became a Republican when the party was founded in the mid-1850s.
