= Henry Setzer =

American lumberman, lawyer and politician

Member of the Minnesota Territorial House of Representatives
- In office September 3, 1849 – December 31, 1850

Member of the Minnesota Territorial Council
- In office January 2, 1856 – December 1, 1857

Personal details
- Born: 1825 Missouri
- Died: 1898 (aged 72–73) Stillwater, Minnesota
- Party: Democratic
- Occupation: Lumberman

Henry Setzer (Note: Setzer's middle initial has been noted as N, A, or F.) (1825–1898) was an American lumberman, lawyer, and politician who served in the Minnesota Territorial House of Representatives from 1849 until 1850 and served in the Territorial Council from 1856 to 1857.

== Biography ==
Setzer was born in Missouri. He arrived in the St. Croix valley in 1843. There, he started working as a laborer in the lumber industry, though eventually progressed in the field of law, opening up his own law firm in Taylors Falls.

Setzer was an attendee of the first Democratic caucus in the state. When elected to the Territorial House in 1849, Setzer's residence was listed as along the Snake River. At age 24, he was the youngest member of the First Territorial Legislature. He was selected as a member of the Territorial Council in 1856 and 1857, this time with his place of residence listed as Stillwater. During his Council tenure, he was notable for his staunch opposition to moving the state capital to St. Peter.

Setzer was a delegate at the 1857 State Constitutional Convention, convened to draft the Minnesota Constitution in order to seek admission to statehood. At the convention, Setzer proposed an amendment which would guarantee married women's rights to suffrage and to hold office, though this amendment was rejected. Setzer was deeply against compromising with the Republicans and at one point walked out of the convention, although he would return a few days later. Setzer ultimately opposed the approved Constitution, as he felt it did not represent the vision of the Democratic Party, but was a signatory.

Between August 4, 1858, and January 1, 1860, Setzer served as the warden for the Minnesota Territorial Prison in Stillwater. Setzer advocated for the prison's relocation due to its cramped conditions. He also procured weaponry from the state's armory for use by the prison guards while serving.

In 1863, he relocated to Superior, Wisconsin, and continued to practice law there until 1866, when he returned to Taylors Falls and his practice there. Around 1894, Setzer moved to Stillwater and opened a practice there as well. He died in 1898 after a month-long bout with pneumonia. At the time of his death, he served as a special judge in Stillwater's municipal courts. He was also one of the first Freemasons in the state, being a charter member of the Stillwater Lodge No. 1.
