= John E. Rollins =

American politician

Member of the U.S. House of Representatives from Missouri's 47th district

Missouri House of Representatives
- In office 1975–1979

Personal details
- Born: 1940 Monett, Missouri
- Died: 2007 (aged 66–67)
- Resting place: Hawthorn Memorial Gardens in Jefferson City, Missouri
- Party: Democratic
- Spouse: Linda L. Schell
- Children: 3 (2 sons, 1 daughter)
- Occupation: securities representative

John E. Rollins (October 28, 1940 - May 13, 2007) was a Democratic politician who served 4 years in the Missouri House of Representatives. He was born in Monett, Missouri, and was educated at Jefferson City public schools, University of Missouri-Rolla, Lincoln University, and Columbia College in Jefferson City. On April 4, 1964, he married Linda L. Schell in Jefferson City. He also served in the United States Marine Corps as a jet aircraft electrician.
