= Clark W. Thompson (Minnesota politician) =

American politician

Clark Thompson

Member of the Minnesota Senate from the 20 district
- In office January 31, 1871 – January 1, 1872
- Preceded by: Jacob A. Latimer
- Succeeded by: Edward Harrison Hutchins (redistricting)

Superintendent of the Northern Superintendency
- In office March 27, 1861 – July 1, 1865
- President: Abraham Lincoln; Andrew Johnson
- Preceded by: William J. Cullen
- Succeeded by: Edward P. Taylor

Member of the Minnesota Territorial Council from the 8th district
- In office January 2, 1856 – December 1, 1857
- Preceded by: District established
- Succeeded by: Council abolished

Member of the Minnesota Territorial House of Representatives from the 4th district
- In office January 3, 1855 – January 1, 1856
- Preceded by: Orville M. Lord
- Succeeded by: Charles Gardner; James B. Hubbell

Personal details
- Born: Clark Wallace Thompson; July 23, 1825 Jordan, Ontario, British Canada
- Died: October 11, 1885 (aged 60) Wells, Minnesota, U.S.
- Party: Republican
- Spouse: Rebecca Sophia Wells
- Education: Mount Morris Academy

Clark W. Thompson (1825–1885) was a Canadian who served in the Minnesota State Senate, and the territorial House and Council for Minnesota Territory.

== Personal life ==
Thompson was born at in Lincoln, Ontario in Canada on July 23, 1825 [6]. He moved to Hokah, Minnesota in 1853 and worked as a miller before beginning his career in government. He married Rebecca Sophia Wells in the city of New York on 14 November 1865. After finishing government service in 1872, he retired to Wells, Minnesota where he owned a farm. He died there in 1885.

== Minnesota State Senate ==
Thompson was elected to the Minnesota State Senate on November 8, 1870; however, the Senate seat was initially given to George Whallon. Whallon served in the Senate until January 1, 1871 at which point it was given to Thompson. Thompson served in the position as senator for the remainder of the term until January 1, 1872. He served in district 20 where he represented Cottonwood, Faribault, Jackson, Martin, Murray, Pipestone, and Rock counties.

== Other government service ==
Thompson participated in the Territorial Republican Constitutional Convention from July 13, 1857 to August 29, 1857. He also served as Superintendent of Indian Affairs for the U.S. Executive Branch (Lincoln and Johnson Administrations) in the Northern Superintendency from 1861–1865. In this capacity, he was supervisor of Ojibwe, Dakota, and Winnebago agencies in Minnesota as well as the LaPointe Ojibwe agency in Wisconsin. The U.S.-Dakota War and the subsequent removals of Minnesota's Dakota and Winnebago occurred during his term of office.

In 1863, Thompson arranged the removal of the Dakota and Ho-Chunk people to the Crow Creek reservation in South Dakota. The land he selected was dry, lacked game for hunting, and was not well suited for people accustomed to a woodland terrain. For six weeks after their arrival at Crow Creek, three or four people died every day from starvation or disease.

The people working above and below Thompson often sought political and business favors. They also encouraged Thompson to commit fraud, and he often went along. In 1863, he led a disastrous campaign to send goods from Mankato to the Dakota and Ho-Chunk at Crow Creek. The plan, called the Moscow Expedition by local papers, allowed Thompson to award lucrative contracts to business partners but delayed the delivery of food. Meanwhile, he ignored the dire situation of the people living at Crow Creek.

At the time, the government largely overlooked Thompson’s corrupt conduct. In 1861, special agent George E. H. Day accused Thompson of fraud in letter to President Lincoln that went ignored. Two years later, in a letter to Senator Henry M. Rice, Bishop Henry B. Whipple noted that Thompson brought $12,000 in gold to the Ojibwe annuity payment, but only $5,500 was paid.

== Legacy ==
Thompson is the namesake of Clark Township, Faribault County, Minnesota and Fort Thompson, South Dakota.
