= Lansing, Minnesota =

Unincorporated community in Minnesota, US

- Census-designated place
- Location within Minnesota Location within the United States
- Coordinates: 43°44′53″N 92°57′57″W
- Country: United States
- State: Minnesota
- County: Mower
- Township: Lansing

Area
  - Total: 0.78 sq mi (2.03 km^{2})
  - Land: 0.78 sq mi (2.03 km^{2})
  - Water: 0 sq mi (0.00 km^{2})
- Elevation: 1,227 ft (374 m)

Population (2020)
  - Total: 132
  - Density: 168.1/sq mi (64.91/km^{2})
- Time zone: UTC-6 (Central (CST))
  - Summer (DST): UTC-5 (CDT)
- ZIP Code: 55950
- Area code: 507
- GNIS feature ID: 2628683
- FIPS code: 27-35558

Lansing is an unincorporated community and census-designated place (CDP) in Lansing Township, Mower County, Minnesota, United States. Its population was 132 as of the 2020 census.

== History ==
Lansing was platted in 1858, and named after Lansing, Michigan. A post office has been in operation at Lansing since 1857.

== Geography ==
Lansing is in northwestern Mower County, in the northeast part of Lansing Township. It is bordered to the east by the Cedar River, a south-flowing tributary of the Iowa River. The community is 6 miles (10 km) north of Austin, the Mower county seat.

According to the U.S. Census Bureau, the Lansing CDP has an area of 0.79 square miles (2.05 km^{2}), all land.

== Population ==
Historical population
Census	Pop.	Note	%±
1880	144		—
2010	181		—
2020	132		−27.1%
U.S. Decennial Census
