= Halvor Halvorson Quie =

Norwegian-American Civil War veteran (1834–1919)

- Born: Halvor Halvorson Kvi; August 11, 1834; Flå, Buskerud, Norway
- Died: September 14, 1919 (aged 85); Dennison, Minnesota
- Relatives: Al Quie (grandson)
- Military career
- Allegiance: Union Army
- Service years: 1862–1863
- Rank: Private
- Unit: 2nd Minnesota Sharpshooters Company
- Conflicts: American Civil War; Battle of Hanover Court House; Battle of Fair Oaks; Siege of Richmond; Battle of Malvern Hill; Battle of Antietam (WIA)

Halvor Halvorson Quie (August 11, 1834 – September 14, 1919) was a Norwegian-American abolitionist, Civil War veteran and a settler-colonist in Minnesota. Halvor also helped establish St. Olaf College in Northfield, Minnesota. He is also the grandfather of Al Quie, the 35th Governor of Minnesota.

== Early life ==
Halvor Quie was born on August 11, 1834, in Buskerud in Eastern Norway. In 1845, when Halvor was 11 years old, he immigrated to the United States and lived with a group of settler-colonist in Muskego, Wisconsin. Quie would also make visits to New England for work and learned English while on these visits. By 1855, Halvor was working on his family's 160-acre farm in Wheeling Township in Rice County. While in Rice County, he worked as an interpreter and was briefly enrolled at Hamline University. During this time, he read Harriet Beecher Stowe's 1852 novel, Uncle Tom's Cabin and became an abolitionist.

== American Civil War ==
Quie enlisted in the 2nd Minnesota Sharpshooters Company on January 20, 1862, after he saw an advertisement for it in the Northfield Telegraph on December 25, 1861. Quie saw action at various battles including Hanover Court House, Fair Oaks and the Siege of Richmond. During the Battle of Malvern Hill, Quie had a heat stroke and was almost captured by a Confederate patrol. On September 17, 1862, during the Battle of Antietam, Quie was shot in his left heel and the wound developed gangrene which he refused to have amputated. The wound eventually healed, and Quie was medical discharged on January 8, 1863.

== Post-war years ==
Following the war, Quie returned to Minnesota and was unable to work on his family's farm due to his injury and briefly worked as a teacher until his injury healed. On December 13, 1864, Halvor married Anne Finseth (1841–1918) and the couple had seven children including Albert M. Quie, the father of Al Quie.

=== St. Olaf College ===
In October 1874, Quie along with Reverend Bernt J. Muus and several other Norwegian-Americans worked on establishing a Christian secondary school which became St. Olaf College. the College was established on November 6, 1874, and had initially had 37 enrolled students. By 1889, it was a respected institution and Quie served on the school's Board of Trustees from 1896 to 1903.

== Later life ==
Quie retired to his farm work but gave the land to his children once he began to lose his eyesight. He moved to Dennison and lived off his pension until his death on September 14, 1919. Quie was buried at Valley Grove Lutheran Church in Nerstrand, Minnesota.
