= John Rollins (Minnesota politician) =

Member of the Minnesota Territorial Council
- In office September 3, 1849 – January 6, 1852
- In office January 2, 1856 – January 6, 1857

Personal details
- Born: March 23, 1806 New Sharon, Massachusetts
- Died: May 7, 1883 (aged 77) Minneapolis, Minnesota
- Party: Democratic
- Occupation: Lumberman; Steamboat operator

John Rollins (March 23, 1806 – May 7, 1883) was an American lumberman, steamboat operator, and politician who served in the Minnesota Territorial Council from 1849 until 1852 and again for the 1856 session.

== Biography ==
Rollins was born in New Sharon, Massachusetts on March 23, 1806. He was one of the first pioneers of Saint Anthony Falls, now a part of Minneapolis, first arriving in 1848. He was active in the lumber industry and operated a steamboat around the falls.

Rollins was elected a member of the Minnesota Territorial Council when the Minnesota Territory was created. Rollins attended the first Minnesota Democratic Party convention on October 20, 1849. He served during the first two sessions.

Following his first stint in the Territorial Council, Rollins was involved in the construction of Minnesota roads, including one from Saint Anthony Falls to Taylors Falls. This road involved a stretch of the Point Douglas to Superior Military Road through the current Wild River State Park.

Rollins was elected to serve in the Territorial Council again but could not complete his second term, resigning on January 6, 1857. William W. Wales succeeded him. Rollins died in Minneapolis on May 7, 1883.
