= Gull River (Crow Wing River tributary) =

Coordinates: 46.3105226°N 94.3822259°W

Location
- Country: United States

Physical characteristics
- Source
  - location: Minnesota

The Gull River is a 14.2-mile-long (22.9 km) tributary of the Crow Wing River in the U.S. state of Minnesota. Rising at the outlet of Gull Lake, it flows south through Cass and Crow Wing counties to the Crow Wing River 2 miles (3 km) southeast of Sylvan. It is part of the Mississippi River drainage basin.

== See also ==
- List of rivers of Minnesota
