= John C. Rollins =

State legislator in Arkansas

John C. Rollins was a state legislator in Arkansas. He represented Ashley County in the Arkansas House of Representatives in 1873. He was a Republican. He was one of the African Americans who served in Arkansas’ legislature during and after the Reconstruction era until the 1970s when voting restrictions imposed by Democrats during the Jim Crow era were lifted in the Civil Rights era.

== See also ==
- African American officeholders from the end of the Civil War until before 1900
