= William Costello =

American animal scientist

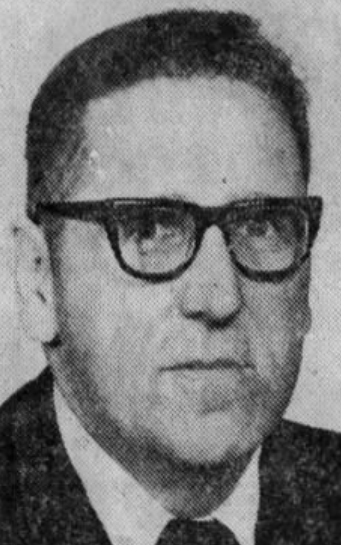
- Costello in 1975
- Born: William James Costello; August 2, 1932; Cavalier, North Dakota, U.S.
- Died: May 6, 2014 (aged 81); Brookings, South Dakota, U.S.
- Education: North Dakota State University; Oklahoma State University
- Occupation: Animal scientist

William James Costello (August 2, 1932 – May 6, 2014) was an American animal scientist.

== Life and career ==
Costello was born in Cavalier, North Dakota, the son of James William Costello and Florence Young. He attended Cavalier High School, graduating in 1950. After graduating, he attended North Dakota State University, earning his B.S. degree in animal husbandry in 1954, which after earning his degree, he served in the United States Army. After his discharge, he attended Oklahoma State University, earning his M.S. degree in animal science in 1960 and his PhD degree in meat science in 1963.

Costello served as a professor in the department of animal and range science at South Dakota State University from 1965 to 1999. During his years as a professor, in 1991, he was named a distinguished professor.

== Death ==
Costello died on May 6, 2014, at the United Living Community in Brookings, South Dakota, at the age of 81.
