= Joseph W. Furber =

American politician (1814–1884)

Joseph Warren Furber
- Furber c. 1868 by Joel Emmons Whitney

1st Speaker of the Minnesota Territory House of Representatives
- In office September 3, 1849 – December 31, 1850
- Preceded by: Territory Created
- Succeeded by: Michael E. Ames

8th Speaker of the Minnesota Territory House of Representatives
- In office January 7, 1857 – December 1, 1857
- Preceded by: Charles Gardner
- Succeeded by: John S. Waltrous (State)

Personal details
- Born: August 29, 1814 Farmington, New Hampshire, U.S.
- Died: July 10, 1884 (aged 69) Cottage Grove, Minnesota, U.S.
- Party: Whig
- Relations: Pierce P. Furber (nephew)
- Children: Aurilla Furber

Joseph Warren Furber (August 29, 1814 – July 10, 1884) was a Whig politician in Minnesota. He was born in Farmington, New Hampshire. He helped with his family's farm and attended school (including Foxcroft Academy) before moving west in 1838. He lived in Alton, Illinois for two years, then worked in the lumber industry near St. Croix Falls, Wisconsin for another two years before settling in Cottage Grove, Minnesota.

In 1846, Furber was elected to the Wisconsin Territorial Legislature as the representative, in the Wisconsin Territorial House of Representatives, for Crawford County, Wisconsin. In 1849, he was elected to the first Minnesota Territorial Legislature and served as the first Speaker of the Minnesota House of Representatives. He was elected to the legislature again in 1856 and once again served as speaker. He was appointed United States Marshal for Minnesota by President Millard Fillmore during the 1850s and also held positions with the state militia and as a member of the University of Minnesota Board of Regents. Later in his life, he was elected to two more terms in the Minnesota State House of Representatives in 1868 and 1875.

He died at his home in Cottage Grove in 1884.

Political offices
Preceded by Territory Created	Speaker of the Minnesota Territory House of Representatives; September 3, 1849 – December 31, 1850	Succeeded by Michael E. Ames
Preceded by Charles Gardner	Speaker of the Minnesota Territory House of Representatives; January 7, 1857 – December 1, 1857	Succeeded by John S. Waltrous; State
