= John B. Brisbin =

American politician (1827–1898)

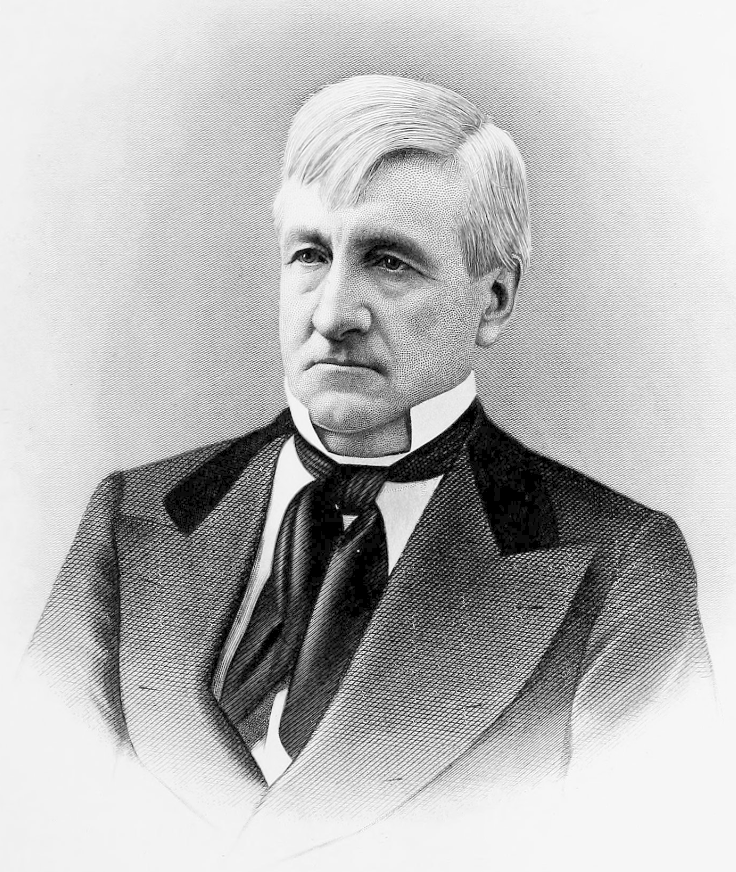

Member of the Minnesota House of Representatives
- In office 1863

Mayor of Saint Paul, Minnesota
- In office 1857–1858

Personal details
- Born: John Ball Brisbin; January 10, 1827 Schuylerville, New York, U.S.
- Died: March 22, 1898 (aged 71) Saint Paul, Minnesota, U.S.
- Party: Democratic
- Spouses: Almira George (m. 1850; died 1863) Margaret M. Jones (m. 1865)
- Children: 1
- Education: Yale College
- Occupation: Lawyer, politician

John Ball Brisbin (January 10, 1827 – March 22, 1898) was an American lawyer and politician who served as the seventh mayor of Saint Paul, Minnesota, from 1857 to 1858. He subsequently served as a member of the Minnesota House of Representatives in 1863.

== Biography ==
Brisbin was born in Schuylerville, New York and went to the Troy and Schuylerville public schools. He graduated from Yale College and studied law. In 1849, Brisbin was admitted to the New York bar. In 1853, Brisbin moved to Saint Paul, Minnesota Territory and continued to practice law. Brisbin served in the Minnesota Territorial Council in 1856 and 1857 and was president of the territorial council. He was a Democrat. He was elected to the Minnesota Territorial House of Representatives for the 1858-1859 session which never met in session. He served in the Minnesota House of Representatives in 1863. Brisbin served as Saint Paul city attorney in 1855 and as mayor of Saint Paul in 1857 and 1858.

He married Almira George on February 20, 1850. She died in 1863, and he remarried to Margaret M. Jones on May 3, 1865. They had one daughter together.

Brisbin died from heart disease at his home in Saint Paul on March 22, 1898.
