= William Henry Forbes =

American politician

William Henry Forbes (C. 1815 – July 20, 1875) was an American fur trader and territorial legislator.

Born in Montreal, Lower Canada, Forbes settled in Wisconsin Territory in 1837. In 1847 he moved to what is now Saint Paul, Minnesota, where he became postmaster. Forbes worked for the American Fur Company, St. Paul Outfit. Forbes then served on the Minnesota Territorial Council 1849–1853. During the Dakota War of 1862, Forbes served in the United States Army as a quartermaster and commissary. He served as county auditor for Ramsey County, Minnesota. In 1871, he served as Indian agent for the Devil's Lake Agency, now the Spirit Lake Tribe. He died in Devil's Lake Agency in 1875 and was buried in St. Paul, Minnesota. His father-in-law was Alexander Faribault, who also served in the Minnesota Territorial Legislature.
