= Elam Greeley =

American politician

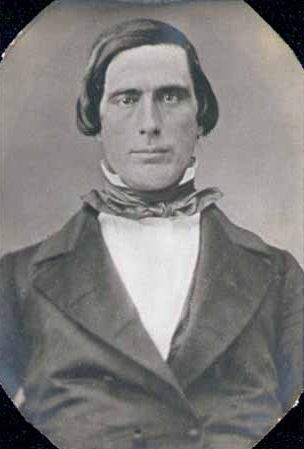
Elam Greely in 1852

Elam Andrew Jackson Greeley (August 13, 1818 – September 13, 1882) was an American businessman and legislator.

Born in Salisbury, New Hampshire, he moved to St. Croix Falls, Wisconsin Territory in 1840. Greeley was in the lumber business. He was the first postmaster of Stillwater, Minnesota and one of the city's founders. He served in the Minnesota Territorial Council 1852 and 1853 and in the Minnesota Territorial House of Representatives in 1857.
