= Minnesota Territorial Legislature =

Legislative body created by the US Congress in 1849

- Minnesota Territory

Type
- Type: Bicameral
- Houses: Council; House of Representatives

History
- Established: 1849
- Disbanded: 1857
- Succeeded by: Minnesota Legislature

Leadership
- President of the Council: John B. Brisbin since 1857
- Speaker of the House: Joseph W. Furber since 1857
- Seats: 27 (1849-1855); 53 (1856-1857)

Elections
- Council voting system: First past the post with white male suffrage
- House of Representatives voting system: First past the post with white male suffrage

Meeting place
- St. Paul

The Minnesota Territorial Legislature was a bicameral legislative body created by the United States Congress in 1849 as the legislative branch of the government of the Territory of Minnesota. The upper chamber, the Council, and the lower chamber, the House of Representatives, first convened on September 3, 1849. The two chambers served as the territory's legislative body until Minnesota was admitted as a state on May 11, 1858, when the Territorial Legislature was replaced by the Minnesota Legislature.

Eight annual sessions were held between 1849 and 1857, though no session was held in 1850. The 1st Territorial Legislature convened in September and adjourned in November; all other sessions of the body convened in January and adjourned in March. Throughout the era, St. Paul was consistently the territorial capital, wherein the Territorial Legislature held its sessions. The Organic Act which created the Territory of Minnesota established that the Territorial Council would have a minimum of nine members, while the House of Representatives would have a minimum of eighteen members; the act also permitted the Territorial Legislature to provide for the election of up to a maximum of fifteen councillors and thirty-nine representatives. The 1st-6th Territorial Legislatures consisted of the minimum number in both houses, while the 7th and 8th consisted of fifteen councillors and thirty-eight representatives.

== Background ==
The first time the area presently known as Minnesota was entirely unified within a single polity was in 1834, when all lands acquired in the Louisiana Purchase which were east of the Missouri River and then remained unallocated, were transferred to the jurisdiction of the Territory of Michigan. In 1836, the lands which are now part of Minnesota were transferred to the Territory of Wisconsin, as Congress prepared for the admission of Michigan as a state, but the Territory of Wisconsin—and the lands of present-day Minnesota—were once again divided at the Mississippi River when Congress created the Territory of Iowa in 1838. When Iowa was admitted as a state in 1846, all parts of the Territory of Iowa which were not included in the State of Iowa were left unceded, as were the portions of the Territory of Wisconsin which fell west of the St. Croix River and St. Louis Bay, when Wisconsin was admitted in 1848. In 1849, Congress finally organized a reunified polity for these unceded lands in the form of the Territory of Minnesota, which, in addition to the current territory of the State of Minnesota, also included the portions of the present-day states of North Dakota and South Dakota which were east of the Missouri River.

When Congress created the Territory of Minnesota, it provided for a very typical territorial government. The executive branch would consist of a Territorial Governor, Territorial Secretary, and Territorial Attorney appointed by the President of the United States, the judicial branch would consist of a Supreme Court appointed by the President and district courts organized according to territorial law, and a bicameral Territorial Legislature, consisting of a Council and a House of Representatives. On June 1, 1849, Alexander Ramsey took office as the first Governor of the Territory of Minnesota, and on September 3, 1849, the 1st Territorial Legislature convened.

== Structure ==
Like its successor, the Minnesota Legislature, the Minnesota Territorial Legislature was bicameral. The upper chamber, the Council, consisted of nine councillors in the 1st through 6th Territorial Legislatures, and fifteen councillors in the 5th and 8th, while the lower chamber, the House of Representatives, consisted of eighteen members in the 1st through 6th Territorial Legislatures, and thirty-eight in the 7th and 8th. The members of the Council were elected to two-year terms, while the members of the House of Representatives were elected to one-year terms.

== Leaders ==
=== Presidents of the Council ===
#	President	Took office	Left office	Party
1	David Olmsted	1849	1851	Democratic
2	David B. Loomis	1851	1852	Whig
3	William Henry Forbes	1852	1853	Unknown
4	Martin McLeod	1853	1854	Unknown
5	Samuel Baldwin Olmstead	1854	1855	Democratic
6	William Pitt Murray	1855	1856	Democratic
7	John B. Brisbin	1856	1857	Democratic

=== Speakers of the House of Representatives ===
#	Speaker	Took office	Left office	Party
1	Joseph W. Furber	1849	1851	Whig
2	Michael E. Ames	1851	1852	Democratic
3	John D. Ludden	1852	1853	Unknown
4	David Day	1853	1854	Unknown
5	Nathan C. D. Taylor	1854	1855	Unknown
6	James S. Norris	1855	1856	Democratic
7	Charles Gardner	1856	1857	Unknown
8	Joseph W. Furber	1857	1857	Republican

== Sessions ==
- 1st Minnesota Territorial Legislature (1849)
- 2nd Minnesota Territorial Legislature (1851)
- 3rd Minnesota Territorial Legislature (1852)
- 4th Minnesota Territorial Legislature (1853)
- 5th Minnesota Territorial Legislature (1854)
- 6th Minnesota Territorial Legislature (1855)
- 7th Minnesota Territorial Legislature (1856)
- 8th Minnesota Territorial Legislature (1857)

== See also ==
- Minnesota Legislature
  - Minnesota Senate
  - Minnesota House of Representatives
- Minnesota Territory
