= Nathan C. D. Taylor =

American politician (1810–1887)

5th Speaker of the Minnesota Territory House of Representatives
- In office 1854–1855
- Preceded by: David Day
- Succeeded by: James S. Norris

Personal details
- Born: 1810 Belknap County, New Hampshire
- Died: March 1887 (aged 76–77) Taylors Falls, Minnesota

Nathan C. D. Taylor (1810 – March 20, 1887) was a politician from Minnesota Territory and a former member of the Minnesota Territory House of Representatives, representing Taylors Falls, Minnesota. He was born in Belknap County, New Hampshire and also lived in Alton, Illinois for a time. He settled near St. Croix Falls, Wisconsin in 1848 and was also involved in the development of Taylors Falls, Minnesota. He ran a mercantile business in Taylors Falls and was also engaged in the lumber industry. He was twice elected to the Minnesota Territory House of Representatives: first in 1854 (where he also served as speaker) and again in 1856 (in a disputed election with William Wallace Kingsbury). He later served as the treasurer for Chisago County, Minnesota from 1866 to 1876. He died in Taylors Falls in 1887.

Political offices
Preceded by David Day	Speaker of the Minnesota Territory House of Representatives; 1854–1855	Succeeded by James S. Norris
