= Charles Gardner (politician) =

American politician (1828–1917)

7th Speaker of the Minnesota Territory House of Representatives
- In office 1856–1857
- Preceded by: James S. Norris
- Succeeded by: Joseph W. Furber

Personal details
- Born: August 12, 1814 New York, U.S.
- Died: February 21, 1892 (aged 77)
- Spouse(s): Spouse 1)Unknown; Spouse 2) Annis Dickson; Spouse 3)Catharine Brandon
- Children: 6

Charles Gardner (August 12, 1814 – February 21, 1892) was a politician from Minnesota Territory and a former member of the Minnesota Territory House of Representatives, representing Cottage Grove, Minnesota. Gardner served as Speaker of the Minnesota Territory House of Representatives in 1856.

Political offices
Preceded by James S. Norris	Speaker of the Minnesota Territory House of Representatives; 1856–1857	Succeeded by Joseph W. Furber
