= James S. Norris =

American politician (1810–1874)

6th Speaker of the Minnesota Territory House of Representatives
- In office 1855–1856
- Preceded by: Nathan C. D. Taylor
- Succeeded by: Charles Gardner

Personal details
- Born: 1810 Monmouth, Maine, U.S.
- Died: March 5, 1874 (aged 63–64) Cottage Grove, Minnesota, U.S.
- Party: Democratic

James S. Norris (1810 – March 5, 1874) was a Democratic politician from Minnesota Territory. Born in Monmouth, Maine, Norris moved to St. Croix Falls, Wisconsin in 1839. He later moved to Minnesota, settling on a farm in Cottage Grove, Minnesota in 1842. He was elected to the first Minnesota Territorial Legislature in 1849 and re-elected in 1854. In 1855, he served as the Speaker of the Minnesota Territory House of Representatives. He attended the state's Democratic Constitutional Convention in 1857. In 1870 he was elected to the Minnesota House of Representatives. He died in Cottage Grove in 1874.

Political offices
Preceded by Nathan C. D. Taylor	Speaker of the Minnesota Territory House of Representatives; 1855–1856	Succeeded by Charles Gardner
