= David Day (Minnesota politician) =

American politician (1825–1896)

- Day in 1870

4th Speaker of the Minnesota Territory House of Representatives
- In office 1853–1854
- Preceded by: John D. Ludden
- Succeeded by: Nathan C. D. Taylor

Personal details
- Born: September 19, 1825 Burke's Garden, Virginia, U.S.
- Died: 1896 (aged 70–71) St. Paul, Minnesota, U.S.

David Day (September 19, 1825 – 1896) was a politician from Minnesota Territory and a former member of the Minnesota Territory House of Representatives, representing Long Prairie, Minnesota. He was born in Burke's Garden, Virginia. In 1846 he moved to Wisconsin to work as a lead miner. In his spare time and during winters he studied medicine, graduating from the University of Pennsylvania School of Medicine in 1849. After graduating he relocated to St. Paul, Minnesota where he worked in the drug business.

Upon arriving in St. Paul on April 25, 1849, he secured lodgings and roomed with John H. Stevens who had arrived just the day before. They were both suffering from "lung difficulties." Mr. Stevens wrote, "he could scarcely walk up the bluff from the old landing," but the climate in Minnesota made them both "strong, healthy men."

Day was elected to the Minnesota Territory House of Representatives in 1851. When the fourth legislature met in Jan. 1853, the house failed to secure a speaker. Two to three weeks were spent in deadlock. It was decided to all meet at the home of John H. Stevens to see if they could come to a decision. Those in attendance included Dr. Day, Hon. Justus C. Ramsey, Hon. John D. Ludden, and other members of the house and territorial senate, as well as prominent St. Paul citizens. The next day, upon opening the session, they elected Dr. David Day as speaker. At the time, he was the resident physician of the Indian department in Long Prairie.

He served as speaker from 1853 to 1854. While he did not serve in the state legislature again, he was appointed to several different state commissions and committees and retired from his medicine business in 1866. He died in St. Paul in 1896.

Political offices
Preceded by John D. Ludden	Speaker of the Minnesota Territory House of Representatives; 1853–1854	Succeeded by Nathan C. D. Taylor
