= William Freeborn =

American politician

William Freeborn (December 13, 1816 – June 3, 1900) was a pioneer in Minnesota, Montana, and California. Freeborn County, Minnesota is named in his honor.

== Pioneer ==
Born in Richland County, Ohio, in 1816, Freeborn moved to Saint Paul, Minnesota in 1848. By 1853 Freeborn had relocated to Red Wing, Minnesota. According to Warren Upham, Freeborn "had large interests, as also at Cannon Falls." From Red Wing, Freeborn moved to Montana, where he spent a season as a gold miner in the Rocky Mountains. In 1868 Freeborn arrived in Santa Margarita, California, where he settled on a ranch. Back in Minnesota, Thomas Newson wrote of Freeborn, "He was a man of progressive and speculative ideas, energetic, always scheming, and had a happy faculty of getting other parties interested in his enterprises. He was a quietly spoken man, of rugged appearance; self-possessed, and never was afraid to venture."

== Politician ==
Freeborn served as a member of the Minnesota Territorial Council in the Minnesota Territorial Legislature from 1854 to 1857, and was mayor of Red Wing, Minnesota in 1858, resigning after less than a year. He also served on the Saint Paul, Minnesota city council.
