= Joe Rolette =

American politician

Joseph Rolette, Jr.
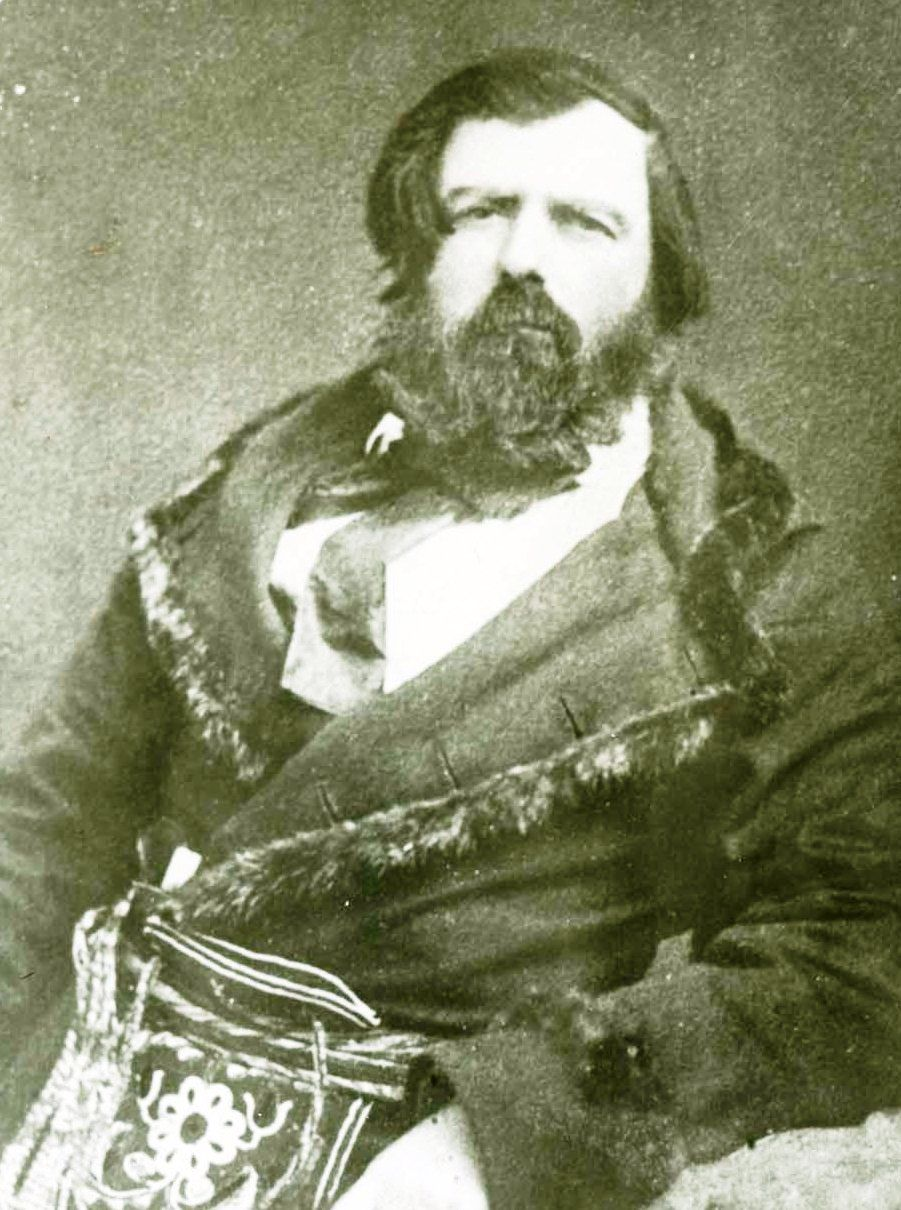
- Rolette in 1860

Member of the Minnesota Senate for district 22 (Note: served in the legislature despite his district no longer existing)
- In office December 7, 1857 – December 6, 1859

Member of the Minnesota Territorial Council for district 7
- In office January 7, 1856 – December 1, 1857

Member of the Minnesota Territorial House of Representatives for district 7
- In office January 7, 1852 – January 1, 1856

Personal details
- Born: October 23, 1820 Prairie du Chien, Wisconsin
- Died: May 16, 1871 (aged 50)
- Party: Democratic

Joseph 'Joe' Rolette, Jr. (October 23, 1820 – May 16, 1871) was an American fur trader and politician during Minnesota's territorial era and the Civil War.

His father was Jean Joseph Rolette, often referred to as Joe Rolette the Elder, a French-Canadian fur trader. Rolette's mother was Jane Fisher, who married Joe Rolette, Sr. in 1818 when she was about 13 or 14 years old.

== Biography ==
=== Fur trader ===
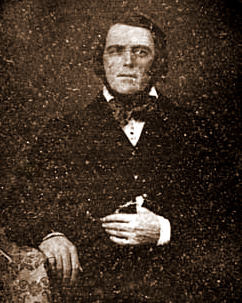
Joe Rolette c. 1841

Rolette was born on October 23, 1820 in Prairie du Chien, Wisconsin. Relatives from his maternal side took young Joseph to New York. Joseph's parents separated in 1836 but never divorced due to their Catholic faith. As part of the settlement, Rolette Sr. built what is today known as the Brisbois House for his estranged wife on Water Street, St. Feriole Island, Prairie du Chien, Wisconsin.

Rolette headed back west in 1840, and by the time he was 21, he was working for his father's partners' in the Red River valley area of Minnesota. Henry Hastings Sibley and Ramsey Crooks were prominent traders running a fur trading company in the area at the time. Whilst in their service, Joseph Rolette rebuilt a trading post at Pembina. He oversaw its defenses and the business being conducted there.

In 1842, young Rolette built his own trail of carts as part of the Red River Trails, between Pembina and the head of Mississippi navigation at Mendota, Minnesota. As a result, a substantial portion of the trade enjoyed by the Hudson's Bay Company in Canada was diverted to the United States. He undertook this venture with his uncle. By this time, the trading post had grown, and a Canadian native, Norman W. Kittson, was managing it. Kittson adopted the system of Red River ox carts, growing and adding more lines until it became a chain of several thousands of vehicles.

During the late 1840s, Rolette also had a hand in defending the posts, both from commercial rivals and the native Dakota and Ojibwe. At one point, he burned down a rival post that traded whisky for furs, a transaction that was illegal during that time. In 1845, he married Angelique Jerome. Together they had eleven children.

=== Political career ===
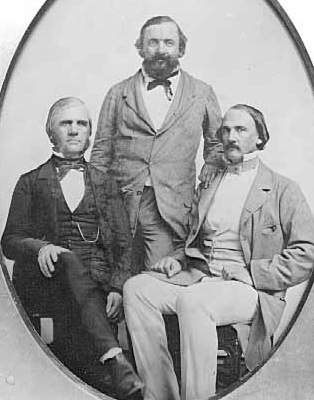
Rolette (center), Henry Hastings Sibley (right), and a man possibly identified as Franklin Steele (left). c. 1857

In 1851, he was elected to the Minnesota Territorial House of Representatives, where he served for four terms. It was during his time in the legislature that the most well-known story about him occurred. A bill to move the state capitol to St. Peter was about to be enacted and, as he was chairman of the enrollment committee, bills of this nature had to pass through him. Rolette took physical possession of the document and disappeared for the rest of the session, not returning until it was too late to pass any more bills. St. Paul remained as the state capitol. Despite this stunt on Rolette's part, the capitol could not be moved except by a referendum anyways. He spent the week away from the legislature drinking and playing poker while moving between hotel rooms with some friends. According to other versions of events, the "hotel rooms" were actually brothels. From 1857 to 1858, he served in the first Minnesota State Constitutional Convention and the Minnesota State Senate.

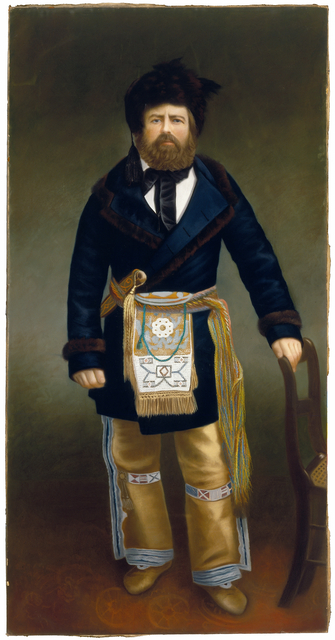
Joe Rolette Painting, posthumous

During the Civil War he was unable to get a commission in the Union army and by the end of the war had lost much of his fortune. In 1862, he led the evacuation of Georgetown during the U.S.-Dakota War of 1862. Subsequently his health declined, and he died on May 16, 1871. Rolette County, North Dakota was named after him.
