= John D. Ludden =

American politician (1819–1907)

- Ludden in ~1852

3rd Speaker of the Minnesota Territory House of Representatives
- In office 1852–1853
- Preceded by: Michael E. Ames
- Succeeded by: David Day

Personal details
- Born: April 5, 1819 Easthampton, Massachusetts, U.S.
- Died: October 14, 1907 (aged 88)

John Dwight "J.D." Ludden (April 5, 1819 – October 14, 1907) was an American politician from the Minnesota Territory and a former member of the Minnesota Territory House of Representatives, representing Marine, Minnesota. Ludden served as Speaker of the Minnesota Territory House of Representatives in 1852.

== Early life and career ==
Born in Easthampton, Massachusetts, Ludden moved to Minnesota in 1849. He was a lumber dealer.

Political offices
Preceded by Michael E. Ames	Speaker of the Minnesota Territory House of Representatives; 1852 – 1853	Succeeded by David Day
