= Pembina Township, Mahnomen County, Minnesota =

Pembina Township, Minnesota
- Township
- Location of Pembina Township, within Mahnomen County, Minnesota

- Location within the state of Minnesota Pembina Township, Minnesota (the United States)
- Coordinates: 47°16′29″N 95°59′12″W
- Country: United States
- State: Minnesota
- County: Mahnomen

Area
  - Total: 36.6 sq mi (94.8 km^{2})
  - Land: 36.5 sq mi (94.5 km^{2})
  - Water: 0.12 sq mi (0.3 km^{2})
- Elevation: 1,211 ft (369 m)

Population (2020)
  - Total: 621
  - Density: 17.0/sq mi (6.57/km^{2})
- Time zone: UTC-6 (CST)
  - Summer (DST): UTC-5 (CDT)
- ZIP code: 56557
- Area code: 218
- FIPS code: 27-50218
- GNIS feature ID: 0665275

Pembina Township is a township in Mahnomen County, Minnesota in the United States. The population was 621 at the 2020 census. It contains part of the census-designated place of Riverland.

Pembina is a name derived from a Native American language meaning a type of cranberry.

== Geography ==
According to the United States Census Bureau, the township has a total area of 36.6 square miles (94.8 km^{2}), of which 36.5 square miles (94.5 km^{2}) of it is land and 0.1 square miles (0.3 km^{2}) of it (0.27%) is water.

== Demographics ==
As of the census of 2000, there were 471 people, 178 households, and 142 families residing in the township. The population density was 12.9 people per square mile (5.0 people/km^{2}). There were 185 housing units at an average density of 5.1 units per square mile (2.0 units/km^{2}). The racial makeup of the township was 80.04% White, 7.01% Native American, 0.21% Asian, 1.27% from other races, and 11.46% from two or more races. Hispanic or Latino of any race were 2.34% of the population.

There were 178 households, out of which 32.6% had children under the age of 18 living with them, 73.0% were married couples living together, 3.9% had a female householder with no husband present, and 19.7% were non-families. 18.0% of all households were made up of individuals, and 4.5% had someone living alone who was 65 years of age or older. The average household size was 2.65 and the average family size was 2.99.

In the township the population was spread out, with 26.1% under the age of 18, 9.1% from 18 to 24, 22.9% from 25 to 44, 28.2% from 45 to 64, and 13.6% who were 65 years of age or older. The median age was 41 years. For every 100 females, there were 107.5 males. For every 100 females age 18 and over, there were 109.6 males.

The median income for a household in the township was $39,722, and the median income for a family was $42,167. Males had a median income of $26,250 versus $21,071 for females. The per capita income for the township was $15,976. About 1.3% of families and 2.7% of the population were below the poverty line, including none of those under age 18 and 5.6% of those age 65 or over.
