= William Pitt Murray =

American politician

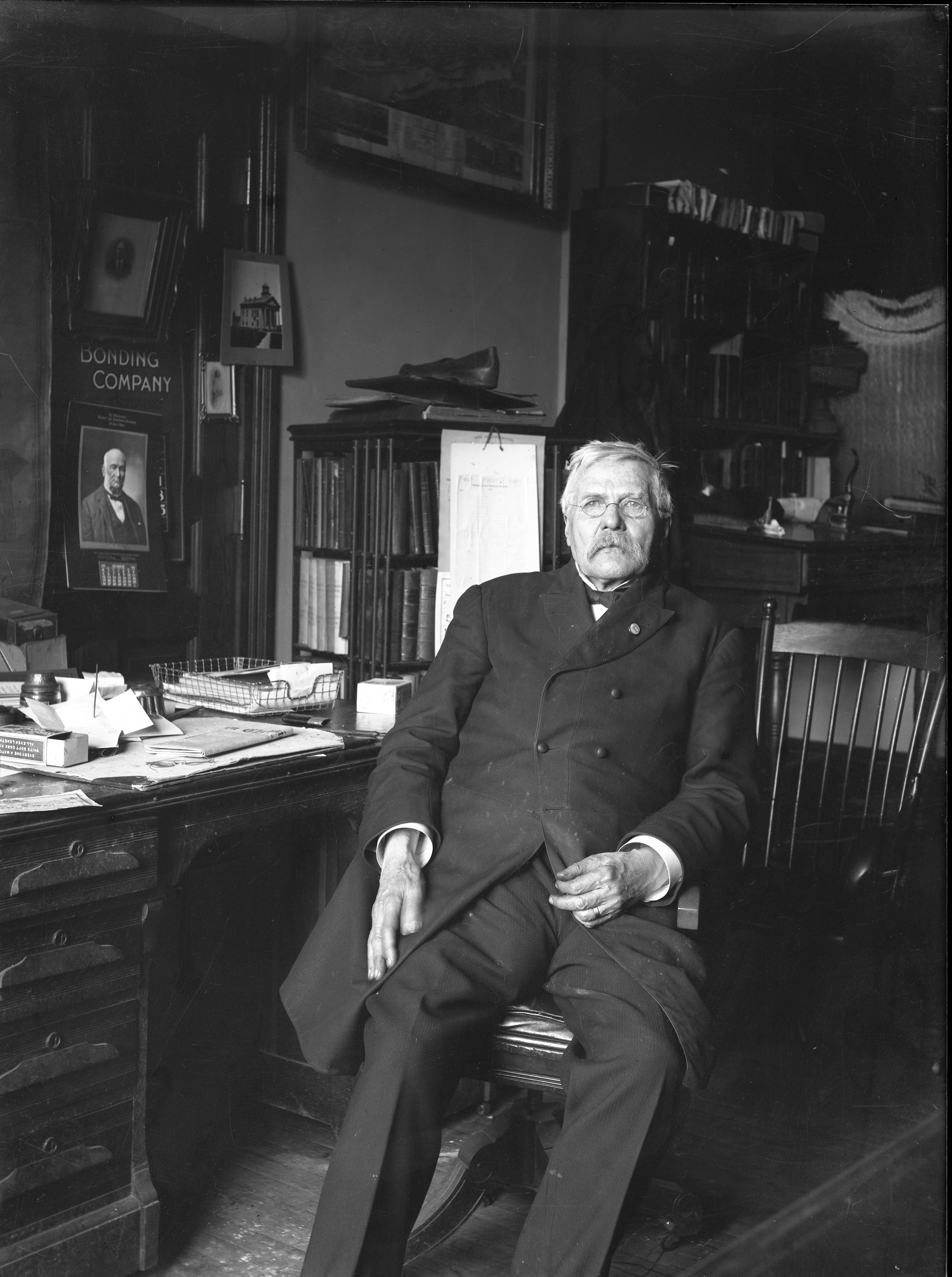
William P. Murray in his office (1906)

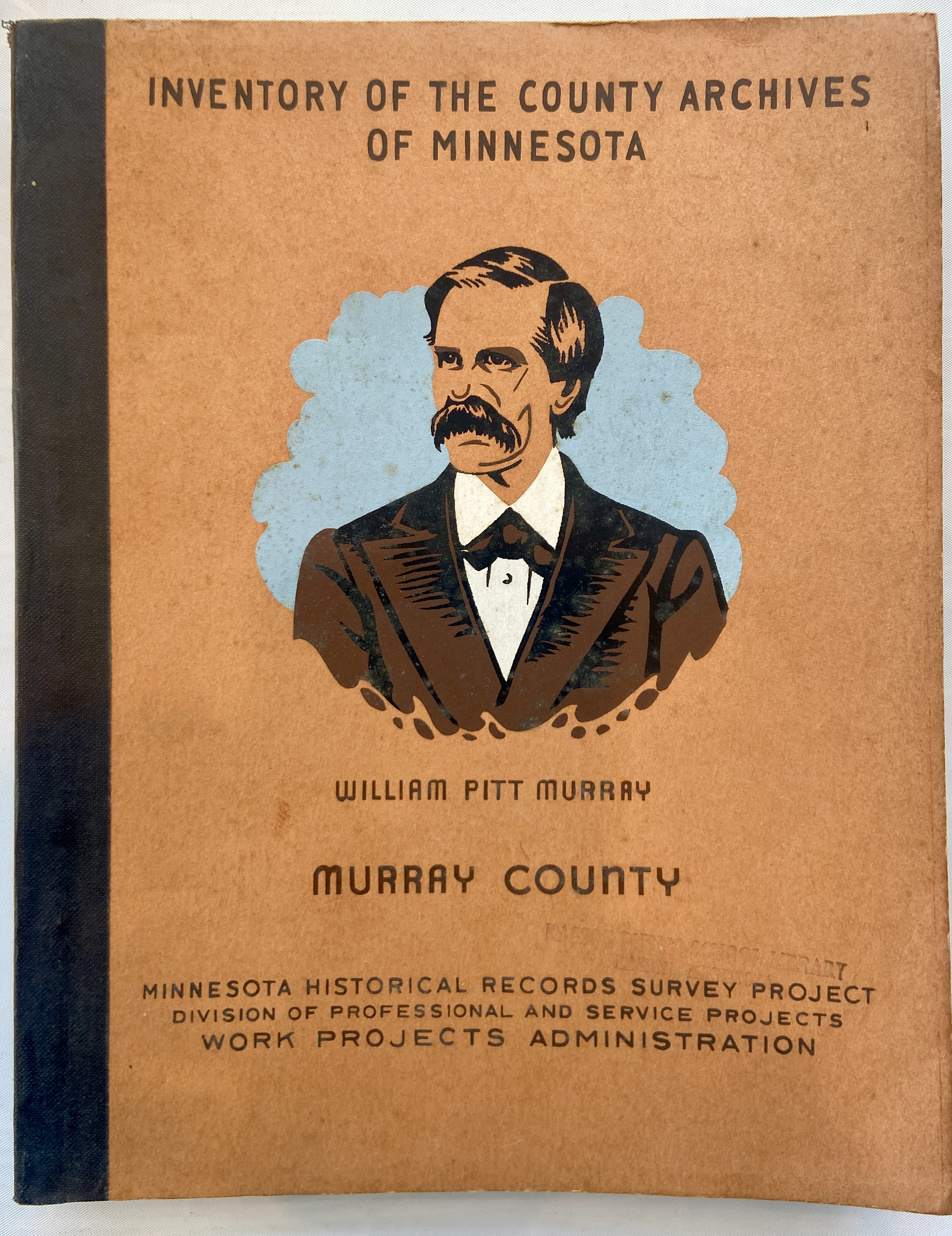
William Pitt Murray Used on the cover of the WPA's Inventory of County Archives of Minnesota, Murray County

William Porter 'Pitt' Murray (June 21, 1825 – June 20, 1910) was an American politician and lawyer. Born in Hamilton, Ohio, Murray went to the Ohio public school system. He studied at Miami University and the Indiana University Law School. In 1849, Murray was admitted to the Indiana bar. He then moved to Saint Paul, Minnesota Territory and practiced law. Murray was a Democrat. He served in the Minnesota Territorial House of Representatives in 1852-1853 and 1857. (In his first House seat he was elected on the People's Party slate, this being a short-lived concocted party that addressed rivalries within the Democratic Party.) Murray also served in the Minnesota Territorial Council in 1854 and 1855. He was elected to the Territorial Minnesota House of Representatives for the 1858-1859 session but that session was never called. Murray did serve in the Minnesota House of Representatives in 1863 and 1868. He served in the Minnesota Senate in 1866 and 1867 and in 1875 and 1876. Murray served on the Ramsey County Board of Commissioners and the Saint Paul City Council. Murray died, at his home, from appendicitis, in Saint Paul, Minnesota just one day before his eighty-fifth birthday.

Murray participated in many major happenings of the Minnesota Territory and early statehood period. He later wrote pieces such as for the St. Paul Globe. Modern readers and researchers will find his reminiscenses to be helpful, worldly, and humorous and yet sometimes irreverant or even flippant, a counterpoint to stuffier accounts. Murray County, Minnesota was named after William Murray.
