= John G. Merritt =

Medal of Honor recipient (1837–1892)

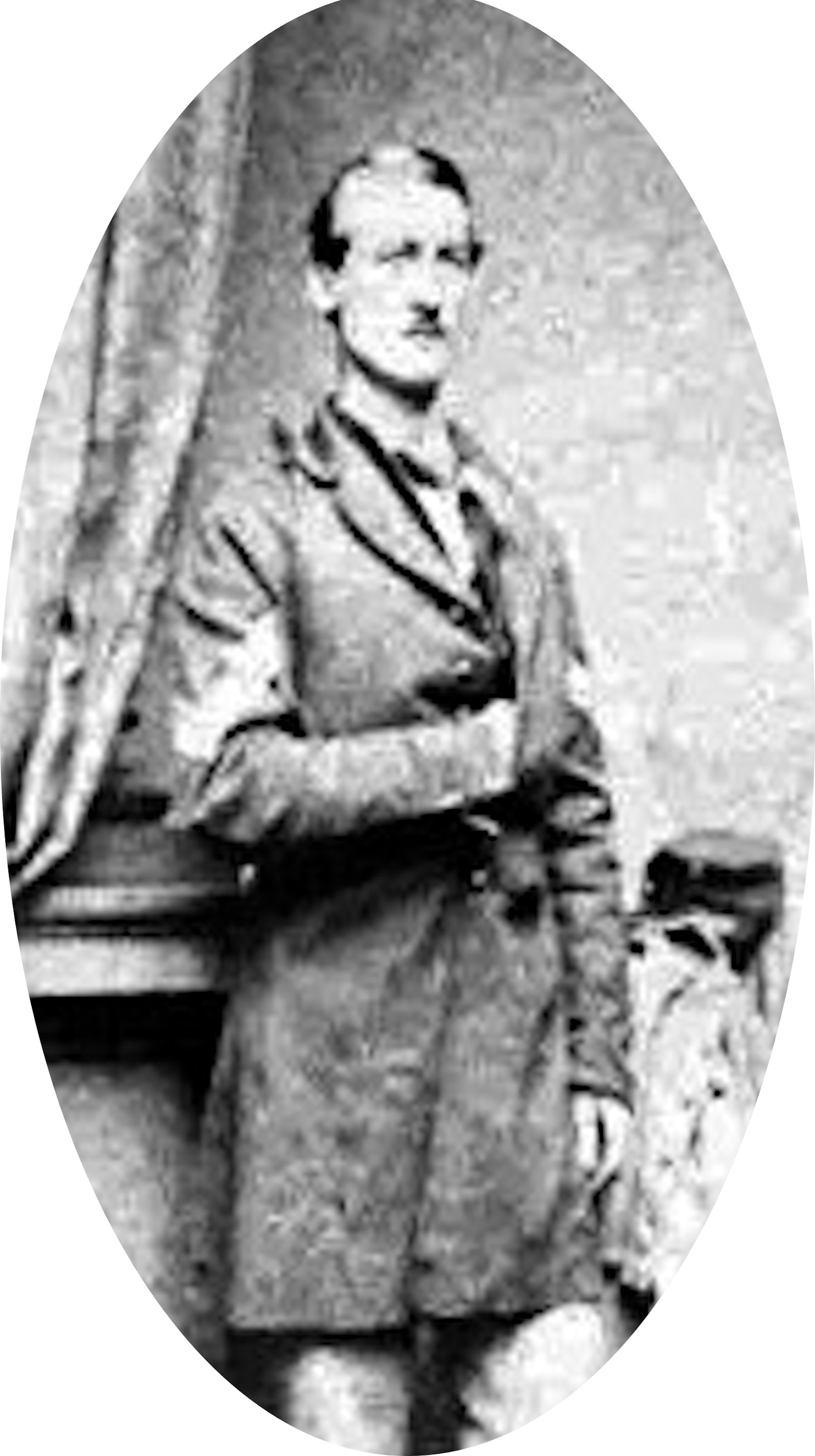
- Merritt c.1865
- Born: October 31, 1837; New York City, New York, U.S.
- Died: December 17, 1892 (aged 55); Washington, D.C., U.S.
- Burial place: Congressional Cemetery, Washington D.C., U.S.
- Military career
- Allegiance: United States of America
- Branch: Union Army
- Service years: 1861–1864
- Rank: Sergeant
- Units: Company K, 1st Minnesota Infantry Regiment
- Conflicts: American Civil War
- Awards: Medal of Honor

John G. Merritt (October 31, 1837 – December 17, 1892) was an American soldier who served in the Union Army during the American Civil War. Merritt received the Medal of Honor for actions taken during the First Battle of Bull Run on July 21, 1861, wherein Merritt was wounded while capturing a Rebel flag ahead of his regiment. Merritt was one of eleven total soldiers and one civilian surgeon, Mary Edwards Walker, who received the Medal of Honor for their actions during the battle.

== Military service ==
Merritt was born in New York City on October 31, 1837. At the outbreak of the American Civil War Merritt volunteered for service in the Union Army and was mustered into the ranks of Company K of the 1st Minnesota Infantry Regiment, nicknamed the "Winona Volunteers", on April 29, 1861. According to the book History of Winona County the company consisted of "one captain, two lieutenants, five sergeants, eight corporals, eighty-two privates, one drummer, one fifer, and one teamster".

=== Battle of Bull Run ===
During the 1st Minnesota's first engagement and the first major battle of the war, the First Battle of Bull Run, Merritt was wounded alongside three other soldiers of the 1st Minnesota who had attempted to capture a rebel flag. According to the book Deeds of Valor: How American Heroes Won the Medal of Honor Merritt had permission to select three other men from his company in order to attempt to capture a Confederate regiment's flag. Merritt selected Sergeant David B. Dudley, Privates Duffee and Grimm, along with an unknown soldier to achieve the task. Merritt, supported by R. Bruce Ricketts artillery battery, charged at the enemy and briefly gained possession of an enemy flag before retreating back towards their regiment, the whole time being harassed by enemy volley fire. Duffee, Grimm, and the unknown soldier were each killed, however, Merritt and Sergeant Dudley were merely wounded. The Confederates pursued and recovered their flag from Merritt. Meanwhile, Dudley assisted Merritt who was wounded in the leg back to the regiment. Merritt and Dudley both survived the affair, although Sergeant Dudley was later mortally wounded at the Battle of Antietam and died a month later.

=== Later service ===
Merritt served the remainder of his enlistment with the rest of the regiment and was discharged with the rest of the regiment on April 2, 1864, at Fort Snelling, although some volunteers chose to reenlist and were folded into the 1st Minnesota Infantry Battalion. Merritt was not initially awarded the Medal of Honor for his actions at the Battle of Bull Run; this did not occur until April 1, 1880.

== Medal of Honor citation ==
Merritt's April 1, 1880 Medal of Honor citation states the following:

"The President of the United States of America, in the name of Congress, takes pleasure in presenting the Medal of Honor to Sergeant John G. Merritt, United States Army, for extraordinary heroism on 21 July 1861, while serving with Company K, 1st Minnesota Infantry, in action at Bull Run, Virginia, for gallantry in action; was wounded while capturing flag in advance of his regiment".

== Later life ==
Following the war Merritt worked in Washington, D.C. as a messenger and assistant to the Sergeant at Arms of the United States Senate, John R. French. Merritt died on December 17, 1892, and is buried in the Congressional Cemetery in Washington, D.C.
