= List of Minnesota units in the American Civil War =

Minnesota provided a large number of units in the American Civil War proportionate to its small population of 172,023 in 1860, with some 26,717 state volunteers recorded, although a number of those are individuals who reenlisted in other units.

== Infantry units ==
- 1st Minnesota Infantry Regiment
- 2nd Minnesota Infantry Regiment
- 3rd Minnesota Infantry Regiment
- 4th Minnesota Infantry Regiment
- 5th Minnesota Infantry Regiment
- 6th Minnesota Infantry Regiment
- 7th Minnesota Infantry Regiment
- 8th Minnesota Infantry Regiment
- 9th Minnesota Infantry Regiment
- 10th Minnesota Infantry Regiment
- 11th Minnesota Infantry Regiment
- 1st Minnesota Infantry Battalion
- 1st Minnesota Sharpshooters Company
- 2nd Minnesota Sharpshooters Company
- 15th Wisconsin Infantry Regiment This regiment, composed predominantly of Norwegian-speaking immigrants, enlisted many Norwegian-Americans from Minnesota. Company K was organized in Freeborn County, Minnesota, with the bulk of its recruits from Minnesota.

== Cavalry units ==
- 1st Minnesota Mounted Rangers
- 2nd Minnesota Cavalry Regiment
- Brackett's Battalion, Minnesota Cavalry
- Hatch's Battalion, Minnesota Cavalry

== Artillery units ==
- 1st Minnesota Heavy Artillery Regiment
- 1st Minnesota Light Artillery Battery
- 2nd Minnesota Light Artillery Battery
- 3rd Minnesota Light Artillery Battery

== Militias ==
Many ad-hoc militia companies were raised for the defense of Minnesota after the Dakota War of 1862 began on August 18, 1862.

- Cullen Frontier Guard
- Renville Rangers
- 1st Battalion, Brown County Militia (Two companies)
- Faxon Rangers
- Hendrick's Citizen Battery of Light Artillery
- St. Paul Cullen Guard
- Unnamed Company of Mounted Men
- Lake Prairie Rangers
- Hastings Rangers
- Chisago County Rangers
- New Ulm Company
- Milford Company
- John Belm's Company
- Nicollet County Guards
- Buggert's Company, Brown County Militia
- St. Peter and Nicollet Guards
- St. Peter Frontier Guards
- Bierbauer's Mankato Riflemen
- LeSueur Tigers No. 1
- LeSueur Tigers No. 2
- Rice County Militia
- Calvin Potter's Mounted Men
- Wabasha County Rangers
- Hutchinson Home Guard
- The Frontier Avengers
- Independent Rangers of Carver County
- Winnebago City Guards
- Sterret's Mounted Men
- T.D Smith's Company of Citizens
- Northern Rangers
- Goodhue County Rangers
- Sibley Guards
- Sauk Center Volunteers
- The Eureka Squad
- Winona Rangers
- Red Wing Cavalry
- Scandinavian Guard
- Roscoe Mounted Militia
- Malmros Guards
- Stillwater Frontier Guards
- Fillmore County Volunteers
- Ramsey Picket Guards
- Marine Guards of Washington
- Blue Earth City Cavalry
- Mankato Home Guard
- Company C, Irregular State Militia
- Butternut Valley Guards
- Marysburgh Home Guard
- New Ulm Citizen Battery

== See also ==
- Lists of American Civil War Regiments by State
