= Fort Snelling =

Historic fort in Minnesota, US

- U.S. National Register of Historic Places
- U.S. National Historic Landmark
- Minnesota State Register of Historic Places
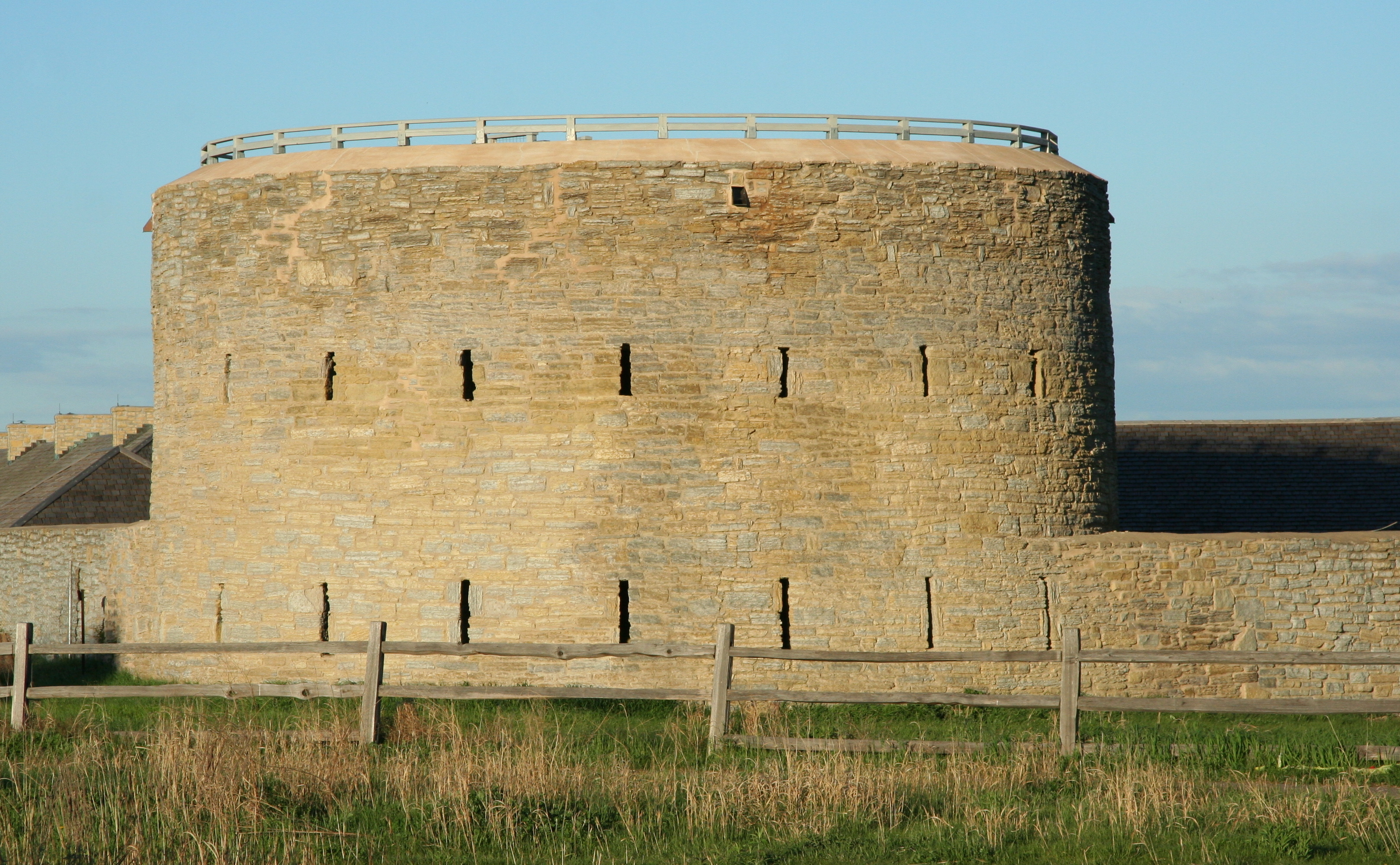
- Fort Snelling's round tower

- Location within Minnesota
- Location: Fort Snelling Unorganized Territory, Minnesota
- Nearest city: Bordering Minneapolis, St. Paul, Mendota and Mendota Heights.
- Coordinates: 44°53′34″N 93°10′50″W
- Built: 1819
- Architect: Colonel Josiah Snelling
- Website: Historic Fort Snelling
- NRHP reference No.: 66000401

Significant dates
- Added to NRHP: 15 October 1966
- Designated NHL: 19 December 1960

Fort Snelling is a former military fortification and National Historic Landmark in the U.S. state of Minnesota on the bluffs overlooking the confluence of the Minnesota and Mississippi Rivers. The site was initially named Fort Saint Anthony but was renamed Fort Snelling when its construction ended in 1825.

Before the American Civil War, the U.S. Army allowed its soldiers and fur traders to bring their personal enslaved people to the fort. These included African Americans Dred Scott and Harriet Robinson Scott, who lived at the fort in the 1830s. In the 1840s, the Scotts sued for their freedom, arguing that having lived in "free territory" made them free, leading to the landmark United States Supreme Court case Dred Scott v. Sandford. Slavery ended at the fort just before Minnesota became a state in 1858.

The fort served as the primary center for U.S. government forces during the Dakota War of 1862. It also was the site of the concentration camp where eastern Dakota and Ho-Chunk non-combatants awaited riverboat transport in their forced removal from Minnesota when hostilities ceased. The fort served as a recruiting station during the Civil War, the Spanish–American War, and both World Wars before being decommissioned again in 1946. It then fell into disrepair until the lower post was restored to its original appearance in 1965. At that time, all that remained of the original lower post were the round and hexagonal towers. Many of the upper post's important buildings remain today, with some still in disrepair.

Multiple government agencies now own parts of the former fort, with the Minnesota Historical Society administering the Historic Fort Snelling site. The Minnesota Department of Natural Resources administers Fort Snelling State Park at the bottom of the bluff. Fort Snelling once encompassed the park's land. It has been cited as a "National Treasure" by the National Trust for Historic Preservation. The historic fort is in the Mississippi National River and Recreation Area, a National Park Service unit. It is in the unorganized territory of Fort Snelling in Hennepin County.

== History ==
=== Bdóte ===
Bdóte ("meeting of waters" or "where two rivers meet") is considered a place of spiritual importance to the Dakota, Ojibwe, Ioway, Otoe, Sauk, Meskwaki and Cheyenne peoples. A Dakota-English Dictionary (1852), edited by missionary Stephen Return Riggs, originally recorded the word as mdóte, noting that it was also "a name commonly applied to the country about Fort Snelling, or mouth of the Saint Peters", now known as the Minnesota River. According to Riggs, "The Mdewakantonwan think that the mouth of the Minnesota River is precisely over the center of the Earth and that they occupy the gate that opens into the western world."

The confluence of the Minnesota and Mississippi Rivers also became a place where Native Americans signed treaties with the United States: the 1805 Treaty of St. Peters signed by the Mdewakanton, the 1837 White Pine Treaty signed by several Ojibwe bands, and the 1851 Treaty of Mendota signed by representatives of the Mdewakanton and Wahpekute Dakota.

=== Land cession treaty ===
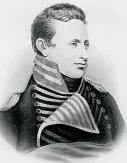
Lieutenant Zebulon Pike acquired the land for the fort in 1805

In 1805, Lieutenant Zebulon Pike signed a treaty he was unauthorized to create, known as Pike's Purchase (1805 Treaty of St. Peters). Seven Dakota men were present, of whom two signed the treaty: Cetan Wakuwa Mani (Petit Corbeau) and Way Aga Enogee (Waynyaga Inaźin). It ceded 155,320 acres of land in the area (400 km^{2}). The document offered an unspecified amount of money, later valued at $2,000, for the land. The treaty states:

Article One — That the Sioux nation grants unto the United States for the purpose of establishment of military posts, nine miles square at the mouth of river St. Croix, also from below the confluence of the Mississippi and St. Peters, up the Mississippi to Include the falls of St. Anthony, extending nine miles on each side of the river.

Legal scholars, historians, and the Dakota have long raised questions about the treaty's validity. Although Pike was an army officer, he was not authorized to sign a treaty on behalf of the United States, nor were there any formal witnesses. Pike represented the treaty as having been agreed to by the entire Sioux nation, but in reality it was signed only by representatives of two Mdewakanton villages.

From a legal point of view, the land the signers intended to convey was inadequately described. No consideration, or payment terms, were in the treaty. Pike wrote in his journal he thought the land was worth $200,000, but in the treaty he left the payment amount blank, letting Congress determine the final amount. On April 16, 1808, when the U.S. Senate ratified the treaty, it approved payment to the Dakota of only $2,000.

In 1819, payment for the ceded lands arrived when the United States Department of War sent Major Thomas Forsyth to distribute goods worth approximately $2,000. In 1838, Indian agent Lawrence Taliaferro paid a further $4,000 to try to settle the matter with the other Dakota band. The issue was raised in treaty negotiations in the 1850s. In 1863, Congress passed an act that "abrogated and annulled" all treaties with the Dakota people. The moral legitimacy of the land title is still disputed.

Pike Island, at the mouth of the Minnesota River, was later named after Zebulon Pike.

=== Frontier post ===
After the War of 1812, the United States Department of War built a chain of forts and installed Indian agents from Lake Michigan to the Missouri River in South Dakota. These forts were intended to extend US presence into the northwest territories after the Treaty of Ghent and the demarcation of the 49th parallel. The treaty restricted British-Canadian traders from operating in the US. The forts were intended to enforce that and to keep Indian lands free of white settlement until permitted by treaty.

The forts were seen as the embodiment of federal authority, representing law and order, and protected pioneers and traders. The Fort Snelling garrison also attempted to keep the peace among the Dakota and other tribes. Also built on army land was the St. Peter's Indian Agency at Mendota. The Anglo-Europeans called the Minnesota River the St. Peter's, and the Indian Agency was part of Fort Snelling from 1820 to 1853.

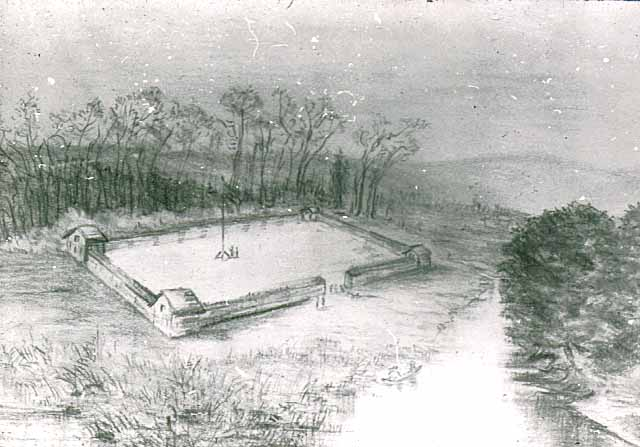
Camp New Hope in 1819

Lieutenant Colonel Henry Leavenworth commanded the expedition of 5th Infantry that built the initial outpost in 1819. That cantonment was called "New Hope" and was on the river flats along the Minnesota River. Leavenworth lost 40 men to scurvy that winter and moved his encampment to Camp Coldwater because he felt the riverside location contributed to the outbreak. The new camp was near a spring closer to the fortification he was constructing. That spring was the fort's source of drinking water throughout the 19th century. It held spiritual significance for the Sioux.

The post surgeon began recording meteorological observations at the fort in January 1820. The U.S. Army Surgeon General made recording four weather readings daily a duty of the surgeon at every Army post. Fort Snelling has one of the nation's longest near-continuous weather records.

In 1820, Colonel Josiah Snelling took command of the outpost and the fort's construction. Upon completion in 1824, he christened his work "Fort St. Anthony" for the waterfalls just upriver. General Winfield Scott changed the name to Fort Snelling in recognition of the fort's architect commander.

From construction in 1820 to closure in 1858, four army units garrisoned the fort—the 1st, 5th, 6th, and 10th Regiments— as did a company from the 1st Dragoons. In 1827 the 5th Infantry was replaced by the 1st Infantry for ten years, with the 5th returning in 1837. The 5th garrisoned the fort until the 1st relieved it again in 1840. In 1848 the 6th Infantry became the garrison. The garrison changed again in November 1855. The 10th, commanded by Colonel Charles Ferguson Smith, assumed duty. Smith went on to become a major general.

Colonel Snelling was recalled to Washington, leaving Fort Snelling in September 1827. He died the next summer from complications of dysentery and a "brain fever".

In 1827, Minnesota's first post office opened at Fort Snelling, with most mail forwarded from Prairie du Chien.

Colonel Zachary Taylor assumed command in 1828. He observed that the "buffalo are entirely gone and bear and deer are scarcely seen." He also wrote that the "Indians subsist principally on fish, water fowl and wild rice". While Taylor was posted to Fort Snelling, eight adult enslaved people with him died, as did several minors.

Along with the construction of the fort, an Indian Agency was constructed on the military reservation opposite the fort at Mendota. It was administered by Major Lawrence Taliaferro. In 1834 Taliaferro and the fort commandant, Major Bliss, assisted missionaries Gideon and Samuel W. Pond in developing the Dakota alphabet and compiling a Dakota dictionary. Taliaferro also served as the Territorial Justice of Peace until 1838, when the governor of Iowa named Henry Sibley as his replacement.

The Agency was used to hold court, and those incarcerated were sent to Fort Snelling's round tower. The town of St. Paul also sent its criminals to the tower until it built its first jail in 1851. Both Fort Snelling and Fort Ripley provided this civil service for internment of criminals until the territory developed the necessary civil infrastructure. Taliaferro had 21 enslaved people with him, including Harriet Robinson. She married Dred Scott, with Taliaferro officiating, at Mendota.

John Marsh arrived at the fort during the early 1820s. He started the first school in the Territory for the officers' children. Marsh developed a relationship with the Dakota, and compiled a dictionary of the Mendota tribe's dialect. He had studied medicine at Harvard without earning a degree. He continued his studies under the tutelage of the fort's physician, Dr. Purcell, but Purcell died before he completed the coursework, and Marsh moved west.

Major Plympton became the post commander in August 1837. He prioritized determining the actual boundaries of the fort's land, doing two surveys. After the second, he sent troops to evict "Pig's Eye" Pierre Parrant from Fountain Cave downriver. Parrant's tavern there was the first commercial venture in what became St. Paul. Parrant was a notorious bootlegger doing business with the Dakota and the soldiers, causing trouble for the fort commander.

After his eviction, Parrant's cave remained a popular place for Fort Snelling's soldiers, as a nearby beer pavilion opened in 1852, serving refreshments and lights for people to explore the cave. The eviction coincided with the arrival of the Catholic missionary Lucian Galtier. That year also saw the arrival of Pierre Bottineau, who served the fort as a guide and interpreter.

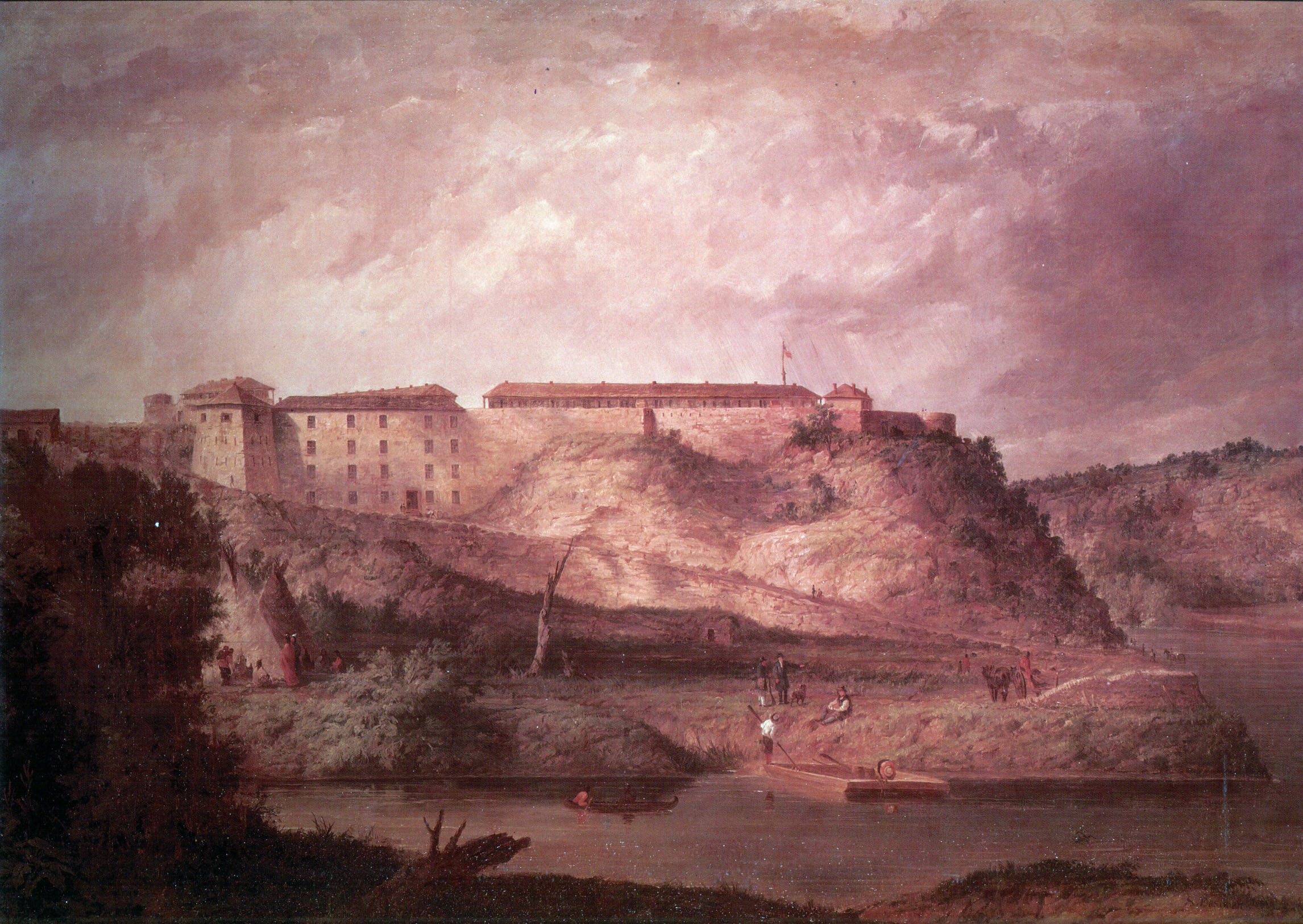
A painting representing Fort Snelling by Colonel Seth Eastman

Lieutenant Colonel Seth Eastman was commander of the fort twice in the 1840s. Eastman was an artist. He has been recognized for his extensive work recording the Dakota. His skill was such that Congress commissioned him to illustrate Henry Rowe Schoolcraft's six-volume study Indian Tribes of the United States. The set was published between 1851 and 1857 with hundreds of his works.

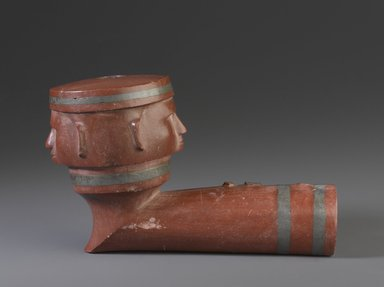
An Inlaid Pipe Bowl with Two Faces collected at Fort Snelling 1833–36

From 1833 to 1836 the surgeon Nathan Sturges Jarvis was stationed at Fort Snelling. During that time he acquired a notable collection of northern plains Native American artifacts now housed at the Brooklyn Museum.

- In 1848 A Co of the 6th U.S. Infantry was dispatched from Fort Snelling to build Fort Ripley.
- In 1848 the Fort's Military Reservation was declared too big, with the lands east of the Mississippi detached and sold. That land created much of what became St. Paul.
- In the summer of 1849, D Company 1st Dragoons escorted Major Woods of the 6th Infantry at Fort Snelling to mark a northern boundary line and select a site for a future fortification near Pembina.
- In 1850 E Co of the 6th Infantry was sent south to build Fort Dodge and garrisoned the fort until the army closed it and sent E Co. to help construct Fort Ridgely.
- In 1850 Alexander Ramsey requested that Congress fund five military roads in the Territory. Two ran from Mendota at Fort Snelling. One followed the Mississippi to Wabasha and the Iowa border. The other headed west to the Big Sioux River confluence with the Missouri.
- In 1853 C, E, and K Companies of the 6th Infantry were tasked with constructing Fort Ridgely.
- Also in 1853, Congress authorized money specifically to "mount" E Company of the 3rd Artillery to be stationed at Fort Snelling and Fort Ridgely until May 1861.
- 1856 Major Edward Canby was fort commander. He became a general, the only one killed in the Indian wars. The town of Canby is named for him.
- 1857–1861 G, I, and L Companies 2nd Artillery were variously posted to northern forts Snelling, Ridgely, and Ripley.
- 1864–65 The Minnesota Valley Railroad completed a line from St. Paul to Minneapolis crossing the river at Mendota and passing beneath the fort. Pilings remain of the line's river crossing.

As Minneapolis and St. Paul grew and with Minnesota statehood before Congress, the need for a forward frontier military post had ceased. In 1857, with the fort's deactivation looming, the garrison was sent to Fort Leavenworth, Kansas, to join the other units being sent to Utah for what became known as the Utah War. With the departure of the 10th Infantry, Fort Snelling was designated as surplus government property.

In 1858, when Minnesota became a state, the army sold it to Franklin Steele for $90,000. Steele operated the two ferries serving the fort across both rivers and served as the fort's sutler. He was also a friend of the sitting president, James Buchanan. At that time the fort sat on 8,000 acres (32 km^{2}). A small part of that was later annexed into south Minneapolis.

The balance of that original land is now broken into Historic Fort Snelling Interpretive Center (300 acres), Fort Snelling State Park (2,931 acres), Fort Snelling National Cemetery (436 acres), Fort Snelling VA Hospital (160 acres), Minnesota Veterans Home (53 acres), the Coldwater Spring unit of the Mississippi National River and Recreation Area (29 acres), the Upper Post Veterans Home, and Minneapolis–Saint Paul International Airport and the Minneapolis-St Paul Joint Air Reserve Station (2,930 acres).

- Fort Snelling watercolor by Lieutenant Sully, October 1855.

=== Slavery at the fort ===
When Fort Snelling was built in 1820, fur traders and officers at the post, including Colonel Snelling, employed slave labor for cooking, cleaning, and other domestic chores. Although slavery was a violation of both the Northwest Ordinance of 1787 and the Missouri Compromise of 1820, an estimated 15–30 Africans were enslaved at the fort.

US Army officers submitted pay vouchers to cover the expenses of retaining enslaved persons. From 1855 to 1857, nine people were enslaved at Fort Snelling. The last slave-holding unit was the 10th Infantry. Slavery was made unconstitutional in Minnesota when the state constitution was ratified in 1858.

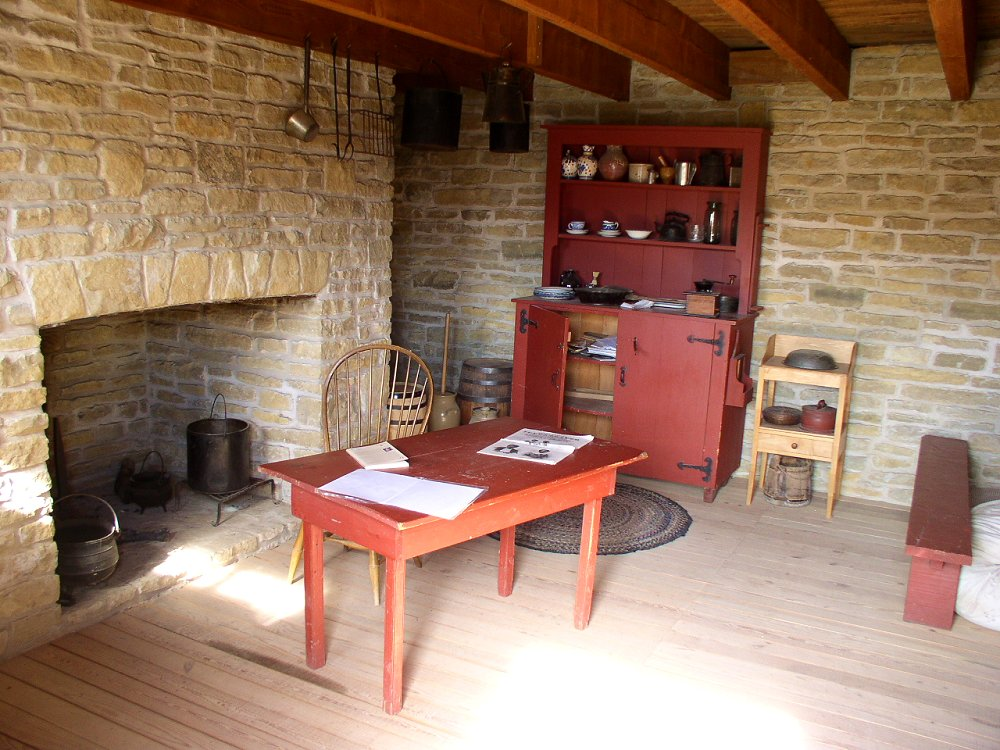
Restored quarters believed to have been occupied by Dred & Harriet Scott 1836–1840 at Fort Snelling

Two women who had lived enslaved at Fort Snelling sued for their freedom and were set free in 1836. One, Rachel, was enslaved by Lieutenant Thomas Stockton at Fort Snelling from 1830 to 1831, then at Fort Crawford at Prairie du Chien until 1834. When Rachel and her son were sold in St. Louis, she sued, claiming she had been illegally enslaved in the Minnesota Territory. In 1836 the Missouri Supreme Court ruled in her favor, making her a free person. The second woman, Courtney, also sued for freedom in St. Louis. When the Missouri Supreme Court ruled in Rachel's favor, Courtney's enslaver conceded her case and freed Courtney and her son, William.

Courtney had another son, Godfrey, who remained in Minnesota when she was sent to a slave market in St. Louis. He is the only known "Minnesota runaway slave" who ran away from the fort and was taken in by the Dakota. He was involved in the Dakota War and was the first defendant on the docket of the military tribunal for hanging. James Thompson was also enslaved around that time at Fort Snelling, first by a sutler and then by military officer William Day; his freedom was purchased by Methodist missionary Alfred Brunson.

The fort surgeon, John Emerson, purchased Dred Scott at a slave market in St. Louis, where slavery was legal. Emerson was posted to Fort Snelling during the 1830s and brought Scott north with him. There Scott met and married Harriet. They had two children as slaves at Fort Snelling from 1836 to 1840. In 1840, Emerson's wife, Irene, returned to St. Louis, taking the Scotts and their children. In 1843, Scott sued for his family's freedom for illegally being indentured in free territory. He lost the first trial, but appealed, and in 1850 his family was given its freedom.

In 1852, Emerson appealed and the Scotts were again enslaved. Dred Scott appealed that decision and in 1857 the US Supreme Court decided in Dred Scott v. Sandford that the Scotts would stay enslaved. A longstanding precedent in freedom suits of "once free, always free" was thus overturned. Chief Justice Roger Taney held that the Missouri Compromise was unconstitutional and that enslaved Africans had no standing under the constitution, and so could not sue for freedom. The case garnered national attention and increased tensions between the North and South.

=== Civil War ===
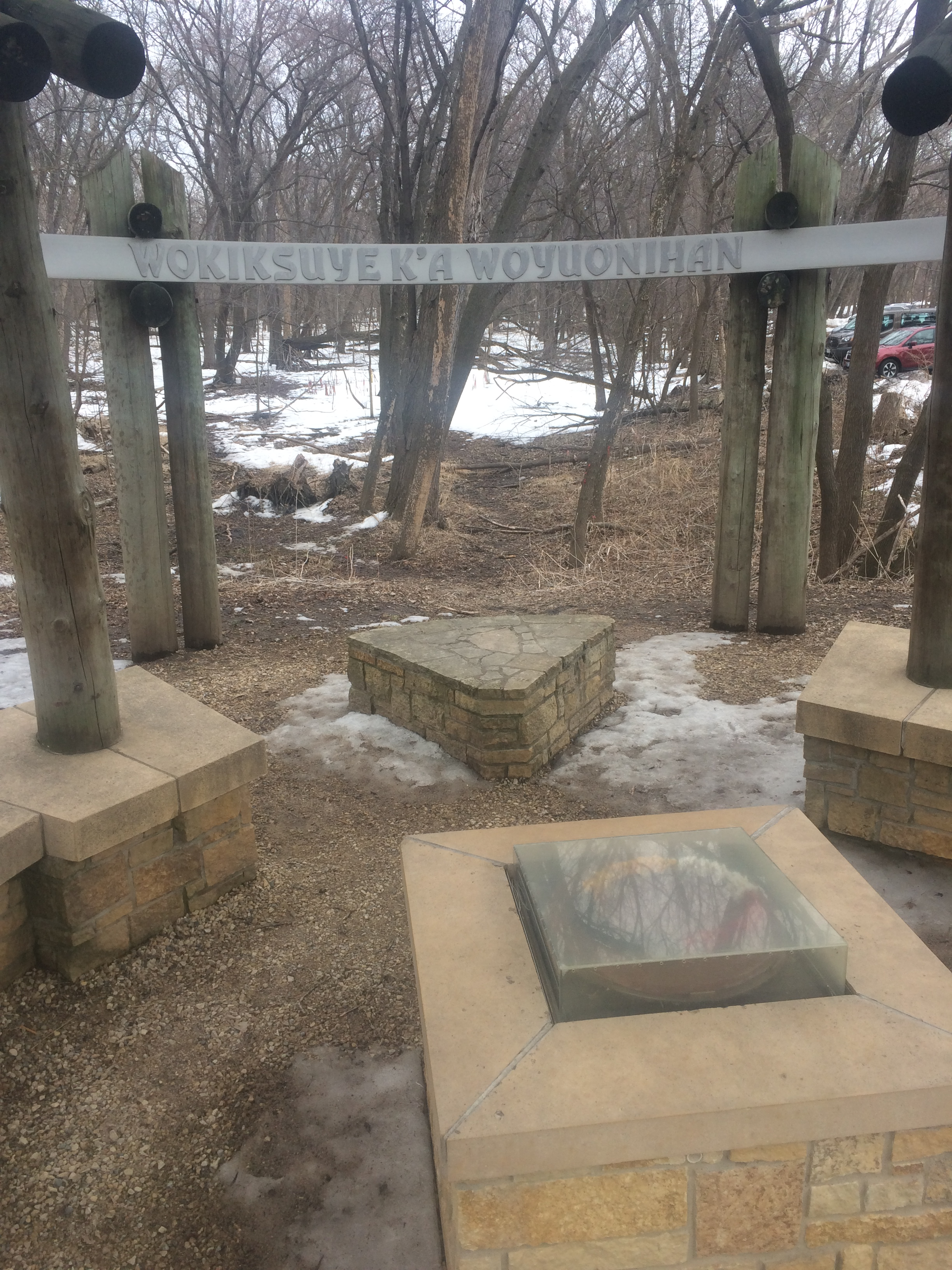
The Wokiksuye K'a Woyuonihan memorial site at Fort Snelling, with a pipestone encased in the center, surrounded by bundles of the four sacred medicines: sage, cedar, tobacco, and sweetgrass.

When the American Civil War broke out, the government commandeered the fort for the War Department as an induction station. At the time Steele was in arrears, having made only one payment. When Governor Ramsey offered President Lincoln 1,000 troops to fight the South, the volunteers he got were organized at Fort Snelling into a regiment, the 1st Minnesota. More than 24,000 recruits were trained there.

Minnesota units mustered in at Fort Snelling:

- 1st Minnesota April 1861 (lineage today: 2nd Battalion 135th Infantry)
- 2nd Minnesota June–July 1861 (lineage today: 136th Infantry Regiment)
- 3rd Minnesota Oct–Nov 1861
- 4th Minnesota Oct–Nov 1861
- 5th Minnesota Mar–Apr 1862
- 6th Minnesota Sep–Nov 1862
- 7th Minnesota Aug–Oct 1862
- 8th Minnesota Jun–Sep 1862
- 9th Minnesota Aug–Oct 1862
- 10th Minnesota Aug–Nov 1862
- 11th Minnesota Aug–Sep 1864
- 1st Minnesota Infantry Battalion Aug–Sep 1864
- 1st Minnesota Sharpshooters Company Apr 1864
- 2nd Minnesota Sharpshooters Company Jan 1862
- 1st Minnesota Heavy Artillery Nov 1864 (today 151st Field Artillery)
- 1st Minnesota Light Artillery Battery Nov 1861
- 2nd Minnesota Light Artillery Battery Mar 1862
- 3rd Minnesota Light Artillery Battery Feb 1863
- 1st Minnesota Cavalry Oct–Dec 1862
- 2nd Minnesota Cavalry Regiment Dec 1863
- 1st Minnesota Light Cavalry(Bracket's Battalion) Sep–Nov 1861
- Minnesota Independent Cavalry Battalion (Hatch's Battalion) Jul 1863
- During the war, slightly over 100 African Americans approached Fort Snelling to volunteer for military service. Minnesota did not have an African American population large enough to field a colored unit (US Infantry units were segregated), so those volunteers were put on riverboats to Iowa and Missouri, states that had colored units: 1st Iowa Infantry Colored, 18th United States Colored Infantry Regiment, and the 68th United States Colored Infantry. The navy had a few volunteers also.
  - In 1830 Fort Snelling was the birthplace of John Taylor Wood. He served on the Merrimack at the Battle of Hampton Roads during the Civil War.

In 1860 and 1863 the Minnesota State Fair was held at the fort.

In 1865 the Minnesota Central Railroad completed a rail line from Northfield to Mendota. There the line crossed the river to Fort Snelling, continuing to Minneapolis. In June 1865 the 10th US Infantry Hq, D, and F Companies returned to the 10th's prewar post at Fort Snelling. B and H Companies went to Fort Ridgely while A and I Companies went to Fort Ripley.

After the war, Steele submitted a claim of $162,000 for the fort's use during the war. He hoped to gain the money he still owed from the 1857 purchase. In 1873, an agreement was reached giving the Army the fort. In exchange, his debt was cleared and Steele was given title to 6,395 acres of the original Fort Snelling Reservation.

=== Dakota War ===
On 19 August 1862, after hearing of attacks at the Lower Sioux Agency the day before, Governor Alexander Ramsey immediately went from St. Paul to Fort Snelling to assess military preparedness. He ordered troops training at or near the fort to be detained from being sent east to fight in the American Civil War. The same day, he asked his longtime friend and political rival, former Governor Henry Hastings Sibley, to lead an expedition up the Minnesota River to end the siege at Fort Ridgely. Ramsey gave him a commission as colonel and turned over four companies of the newly organized 6th Minnesota Volunteer Infantry Regiment to Sibley at Fort Snelling.

The fort became the rendezvous point for the state and federal military forces during the Dakota War of 1862. During the war, the 6th, 7th, and 10th Minnesota Regiments did garrison duty at Fort Snelling.

To deal with the uprising, the United States Department of War created the Department of the Northwest, headquartered at St. Paul and commanded by Major General John Pope. Pope arrived in St. Paul on 15 September, and sent requests to the governors of Iowa and Wisconsin for additional troops. The 25th Wisconsin Infantry Regiment arrived at Fort Snelling on 22 September, the day before the decisive Battle of Wood Lake, and were sent immediately to Mankato and Paynesville. The 27th Iowa Infantry Regiment arrived at Fort Snelling in October, well after the war. Four companies stayed at Fort Snelling, while the other six marched north to Mille Lacs and returned to Fort Snelling on 4 November; three days later they were sent to Cairo, Illinois.

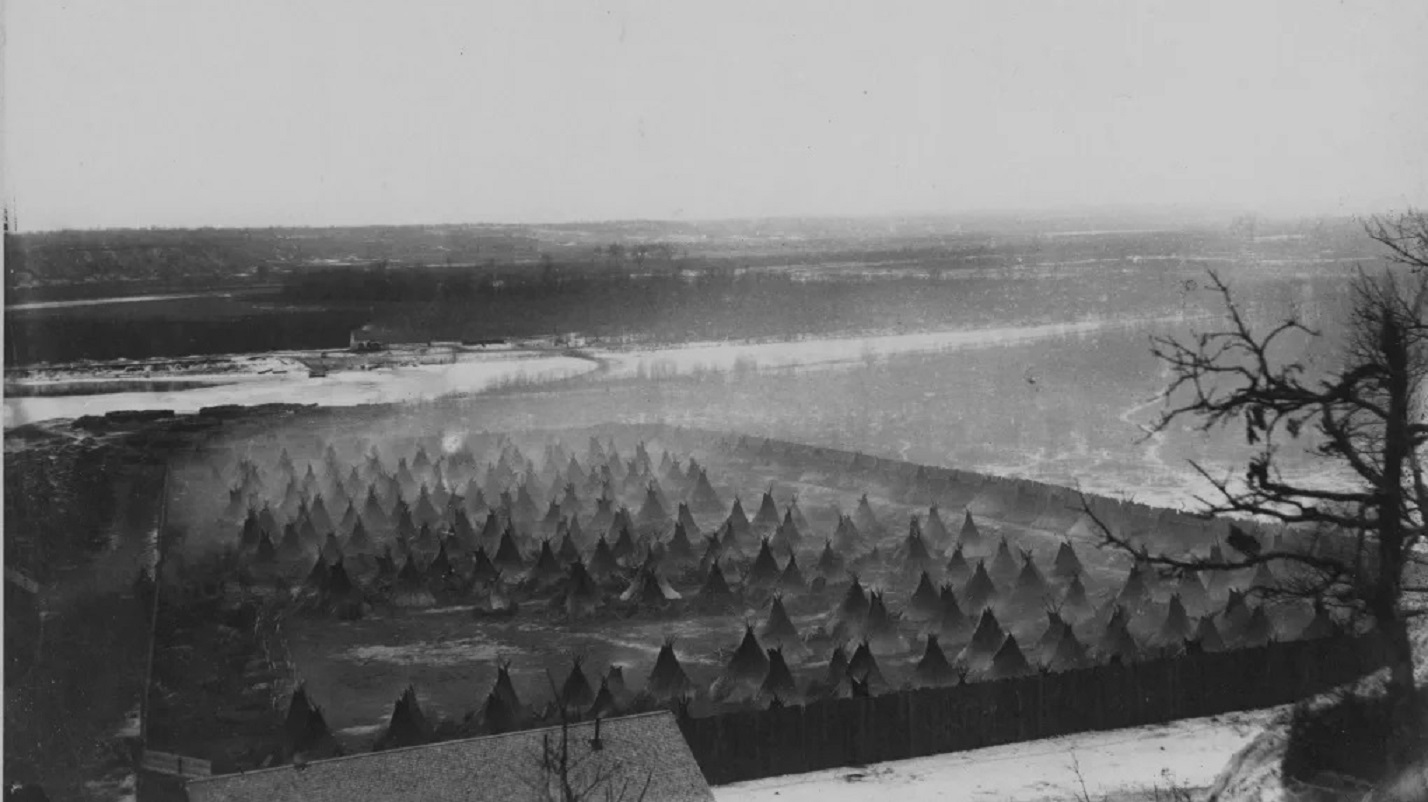
The Dakota internment camp, Pike Island, winter 1862

In November 1862, 1,658 Dakota, all innocent non-combatants, were moved from the Lower Sioux Agency to a crowded stockade at Fort Snelling, escorted by 300 soldiers under Lieutenant Colonel William Rainey Marshall. They were mostly Dakota women, children, and elderly people. They included 22 Franco-Dakota and Anglo-Dakota men who had not been tried, as well as Christian and farmer Dakota such as Taopi, Chief Wabasha, Joseph Kawanke, Paul Mazakutemani, Lorenzo Lawrence, John Other Day and Snana, who had opposed Chief Little Crow III and the "hostile" faction during the war.

An encampment was created below the fort on Pike Island. The Dakota had brought their own tipis and household goods with them, and set up more than 200 tipis. The military leaders erected a palisade around the encampment to protect the Dakota from angry settlers, some of whom had attacked the women and children as they passed through Henderson en route to Fort Snelling. Shortly after they arrived, soldiers raped one of the Dakota women. The Dakota wintered there in 1862–63. An estimated 102 to 300 Dakota died due to the harsh conditions, lack of food, measles, and cholera.

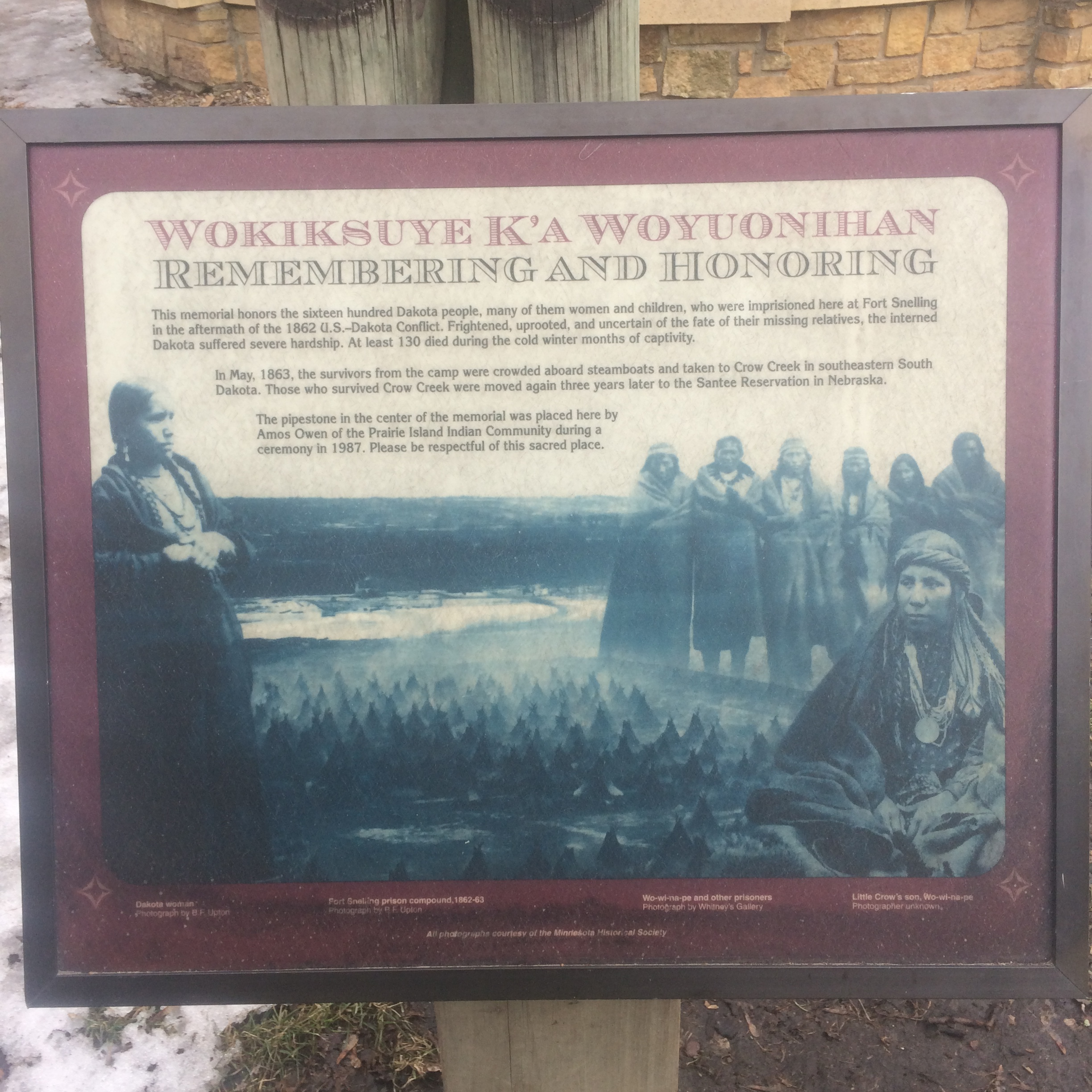
A memorial for the Dakota who were interned and died at Fort Snelling

In May 1863, the Dakota who survived were loaded onto two steamboats and taken down the Mississippi and up the Missouri River to Crow Creek by the Great Sioux Reservation. Three hundred more died on the way and three to four a day for weeks after they arrived. Some of the Dakota who made it to Crow Creek were forced to move again three years later to the Santee Sioux Reservation in Nebraska. For the women it was an extended period of hardship and degradation.

The descendants of the displaced Dakota reside there today. A memorial outside the Fort Snelling State Park visitor center commemorates the Native Americans who died during this period. Because of the prevailing attitudes toward all "Indians", the Ho-Chunk (Winnebago) living outside Mankato were also sent to Fort Snelling, where they too were put on riverboats for Crow Creek. They lost 500 along the way and once there, they and the Dakota lost another 1,300 to starvation.

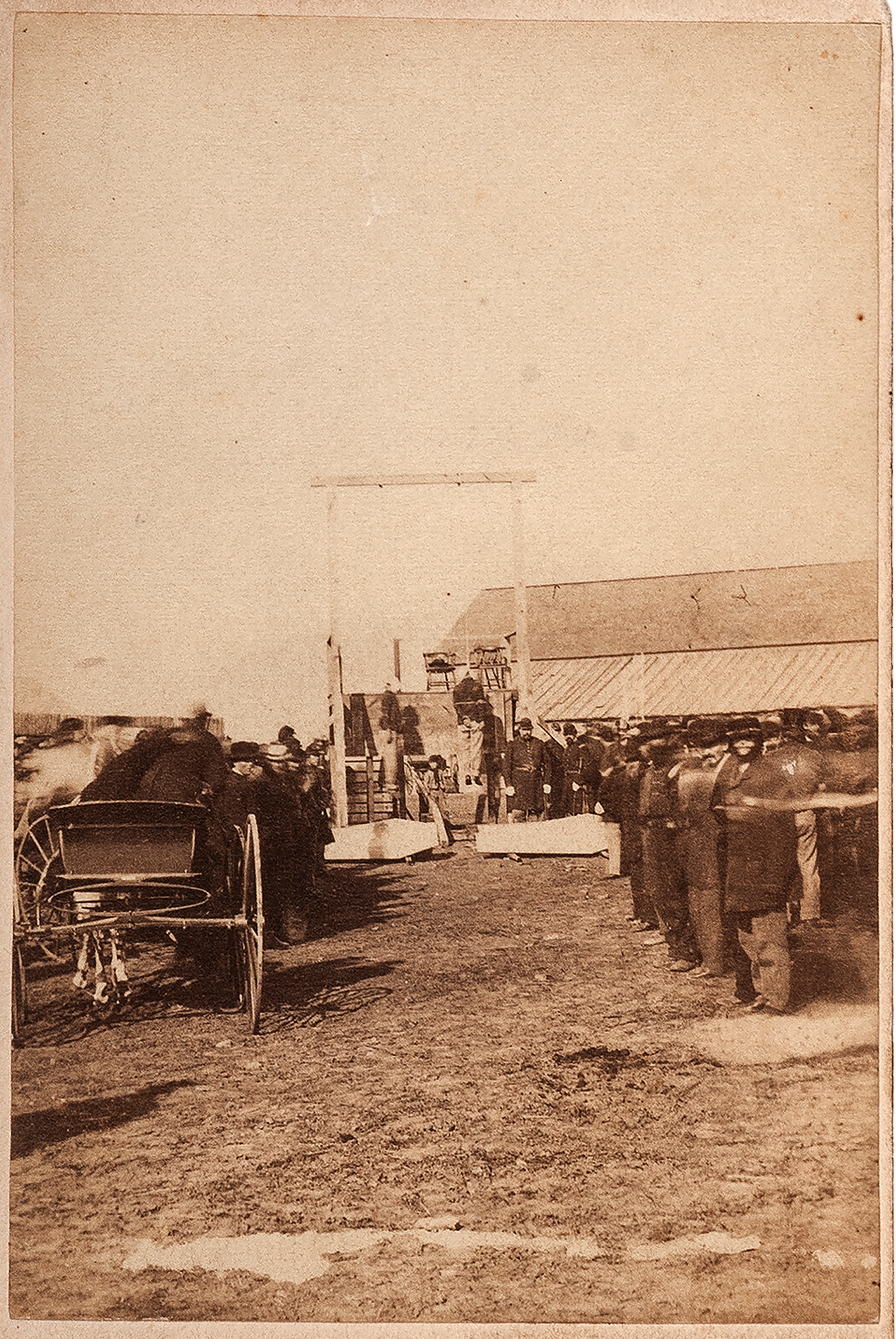
The hanging of Little Six and Medicine Bottle, November 11, 1865, Fort Snelling

In October 1863, Major E. A. C. Hatch and his battalion were ordered from Fort Snelling to retrieve Dakota leaders who had crossed into Canada. Winter set in before they reached Pembina in Dakota Territory. Hatch made an encampment at Pembina, sending 20 men across the border. They encountered and killed Minnesota Dakota at St. Joseph in the Northwest Territory. At Fort Gerry, two Dakota leaders were drugged, kidnapped, and taken to Hatch for a bounty. The killings at St. Joseph caused almost 400 Dakota to turn themselves in to Hatch.

When conditions allowed, Hatch's cavalry took the prisoners back to Fort Snelling. Two chiefs, Little Six (Sakpedan) and Medicine Bottle (Wakanozanzan), were hanged at the fort. Chief Little Leaf evaded capture.

The next year, four companies of the 30th Wisconsin Infantry Regiment arrived at Fort Snelling with three of them moving on to Camp Ridgely en route to Alfred Sully's Dakota campaign.

=== Indian Wars and Spanish–American War ===
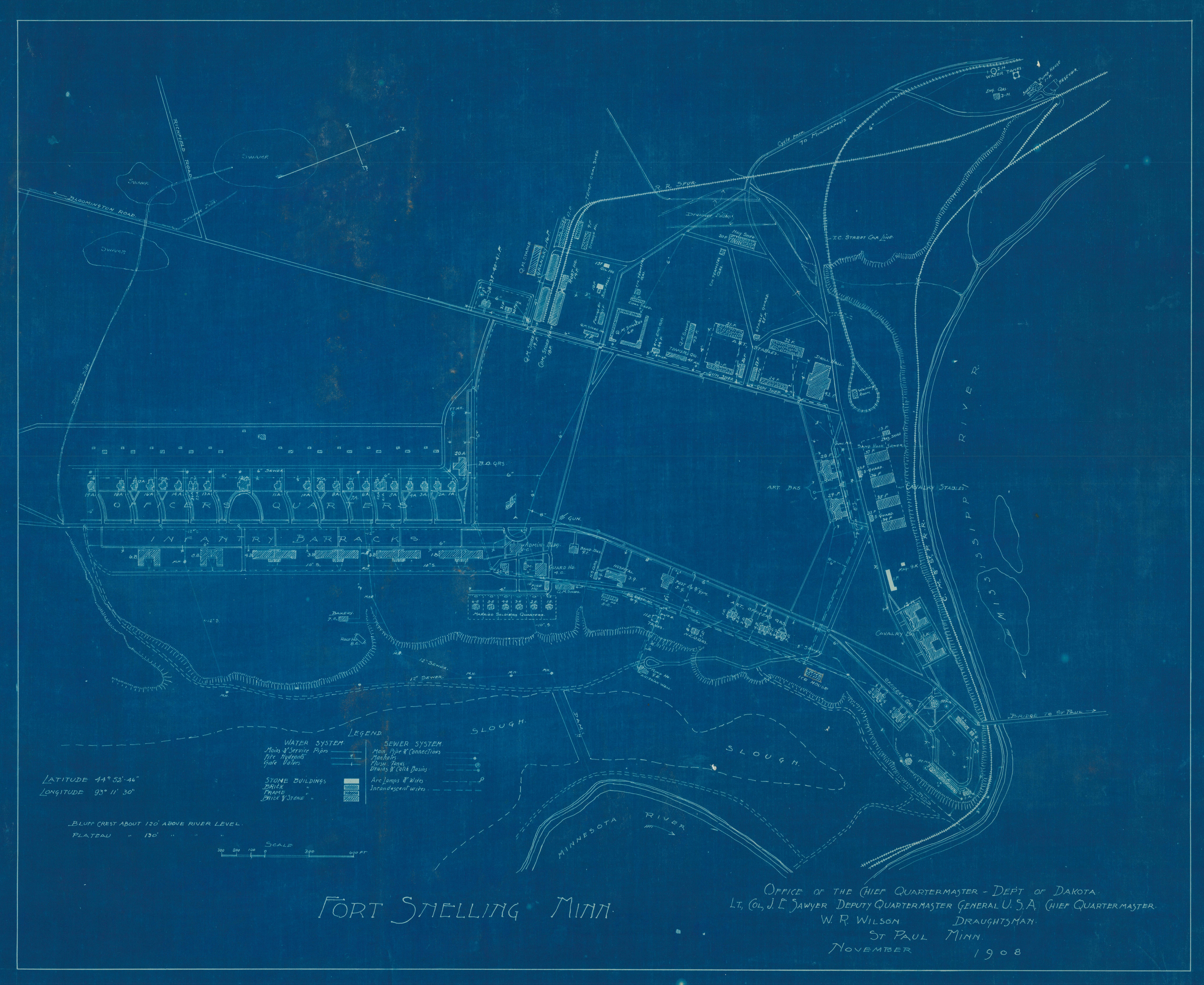
A map of Fort Snelling, November 1908

Steele had made plans and plotted his purchase to build the City of Fort Snelling. He failed to make the agreed payments, causing the government to revoke the sale and repossess the fort lands. Placing the Department of the Northwest at Fort Snelling led to the fort's further development in 1866 when the department transitioned to the Department of Dakota. In 1867, the department headquarters moved to St. Paul. The HQ returned to the fort in 1879 and remained there until 1886, when it returned to St. Paul. After the Civil War, Minneapolis began to expand into the fort's surroundings.

In March 1869 the 20th Regiment was transferred from Louisiana to the Department of Dakota. Headquarters, band and E Company were posted to Fort Snelling.

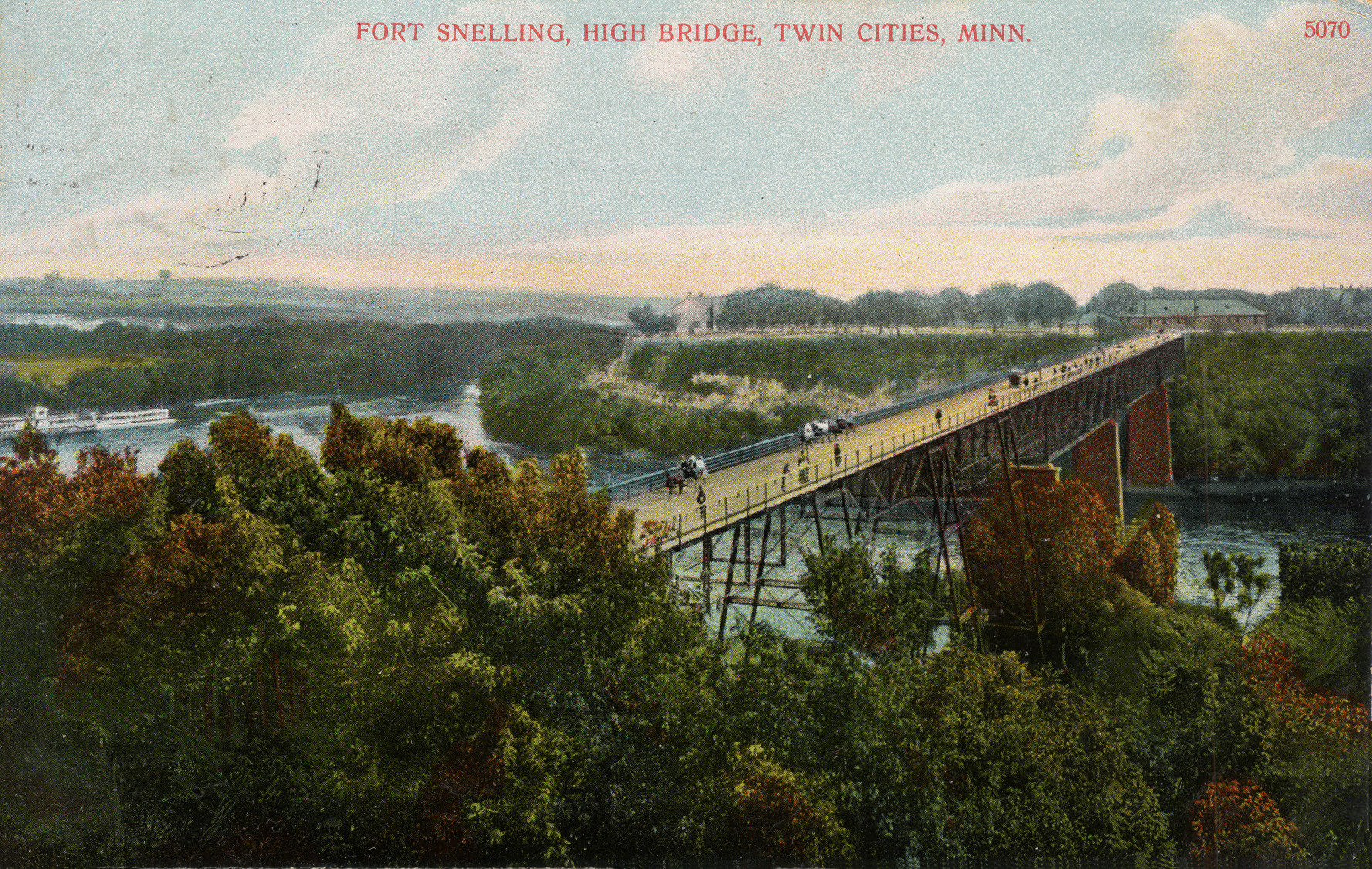
The bridge linking Ft. Snelling with St. Paul, 1880–1912

In 1878, the United States Army assigned the 7th Infantry to garrison the fort. Six companies arrived in September. That year Congress approved $100,000 to be spent on the Department of Dakota and the old fort's walls were torn down for reuse in the new construction. In October 1879, the remaining four companies of the 7th Infantry arrived and took over garrison duties. The six companies that had been the garrison departed to fight the Utes at White River, Colorado. They returned to Fort Snelling in 1880.

In November 1882, the 7th was relieved by the 25th Infantry (colored). The 25th's HQ, band and four companies garrisoned the fort until 1888, when they were relieved by the 3rd Infantry. During the 1880s, companies of the 7th Cavalry were at the fort. The 3rd Regiment remained until 1898. Some of the garrison were sent to Cuba and fought in the Spanish–American War of 1898.

During one of the last battles of the Indian Wars, six soldiers of the 3rd Infantry were killed at the Battle of Leech Lake October 5, 1898. Those killed were Major Wilkinson, Sergeant William Butler, and Privates Edward Lowe, John Olmstead (Onstead), John Schwolenstocker (aka Daniel F. Schwalenstocker), and Albert Ziebel. They were buried at the post's north end.

Ten others were wounded in the battle. Among them were five Minnesotans: Privates George Wicker, Charles Turner, Edward Brown, Jes Jensen, and Gottfried Ziegler. Private Oscar Burkard received the last Medal of Honor awarded during the Indian wars for his action on 5 October 1898 at Leech Lake with the 3rd Infantry. He was also from Minnesota.

In 1895, General E. C. Mason, post commandant, called for the preservation of what remained of the old fort, having realized something had been lost with the dismantling of the walls. Nothing came of the preservation proposal, but from 1901 to 1905 Congress spent $2,000,000 on the Fort Snelling upper post.

In 1901, the 14th Infantry became the garrison, followed by the 28th in 1904. From 1905 to 1911 squadrons of the 3rd, 2nd, and 4th Cavalry Regiments were the occupants of the new cavalry barracks on the upper post.

In June 1916, President Woodrow Wilson had General Pershing in Mexico on the trail of Pancho Villa. To provide border security, Minnesota's National Guard was activated at Fort Snelling, comprising three Infantry Regiments and one Artillery. Camp Bobleter was created on the upper post to organize the activation. Upon returning to Minnesota, the 1st Infantry Regiment was redesignated the 135th Infantry. It is the direct descendant of the 1st Minnesota formed at the fort in 1862.

- Sergeant Charles H. Welch was awarded the Medal of Honor for his actions at Little Big Horn in 1876. His award lists his home as Fort Snelling. Welch enlisted in the Army on June 8, 1873, at Fort Snelling, and was assigned to D Company 7th U.S. Cavalry.

=== World War I ===
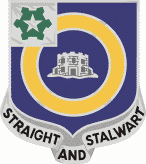
The 41st Infantry Regiment insignia, with Fort Snelling's round tower emblazoned at center

When the US entered World War I, the fort became a recruit processing station. The 41st Infantry was constituted at the fort in May 1917 and inactivated in September 1921. The army established an officer training school, which closed when the war ended. At that time the only building in use was the base hospital. It was expanded to 1,200 beds and designated General Hospital 29. During the 1918 influenza pandemic it saw extensive use. It was the forerunner of the VA Hospital at Fort Snelling. Between wars, the 14th Field Artillery and the 7th Tank Battalion were assigned to Fort Snelling while the base was considered the "Country Club of the U. S. Army".

In 1921, the 3rd Infantry was in Ohio and ordered to report to Fort Snelling with no designated transport. They marched the 940 miles only to have the 2nd and 3rd Battalions deactivated upon arrival. In June 1922, the 1st Battalion was deactivated for a short time. The regiment remained at Fort Snelling until 1941. Also in 1921 the US Army created the 88th Divisional area in Iowa, Minnesota, and North Dakota.

Fort Snelling became a Citizens Military Training Camp (CMTC) for the 351st Infantry Regiment of the 88th Division. The unit's officers worked with the CCC program at Fort Snelling. When Japan attacked Pearl Harbor, the regiment's officers were immediately activated for active duty units, so that when the 351st was called up it had very few officers to meet the call.

=== Civilian Conservation Corps ===
In 1933 the Civilian Conservation Corps was created by Executive Order 6101. Fort Snelling was in the Seventh Corps Area of the US Army, and the Works Progress Administration (WPA) established a supply depot at Fort Snelling to support CCC camps. A CCC Headquarters Company was stationed at the fort. Minnesota had two entirely African American CCC companies. One of them worked next to the fort in Fort Snelling State Park.

=== World War II ===
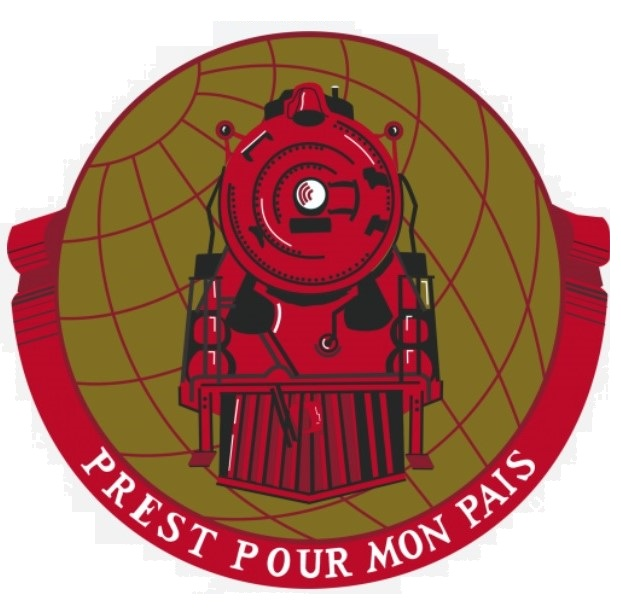
Military Railroad Service insignia

During World War II, the Fort Snelling military reservation served both the army and navy. The army had an enlistment center there that processed 300,000 enlistees. The War Department chose the base as the site of the army's Military Railroad Service (MRS) headquarters in 1942 and a winter warfare program later. The MRS was closely linked to commercial railroading, with multiple Minnesota railroads sponsoring MRS Railroad Operating Battalions. That year the Army created two Railroad Divisions, with the Great Northern Railroad sponsoring the 704th.

The 1st MRS Division was activated at Fort Snelling (as the 701st), from where it deployed to Italy, Southern France, and North Africa. It was commanded by Brigadier General Carl R. Gray Jr. of the Chicago, St. Paul, Minneapolis and Omaha Railway. Gray was responsible for creating a Commendation for Meritorious Service (MRS Certificate of Merit) specific to railroading troops. In January 1943, the 701st Railway Grand Division, sponsored by the New York Central Railroad, was stood up at Fort Snelling.

Minnesota Railroads sponsored multiple Railroad Operating Battalions (ROBs), with the Great Northern sponsoring the 732nd ROB, which trained at Fort Sam Houston. It landed in France and was one of two spearhead ROBs. The 732nd operated in support of General George S. Patton's 3rd Armored Division and went into Germany with it.

During the Battle of the Bulge, Patton's armor went to the 732nd's trains to refuel. The Army positioned field Artillery directly adjacent to the rail lines so that the 732nd delivered ammo directly to the guns. The 757th Railroad Shop Battalion, sponsored by the Chicago, Milwaukee, St. Paul and Pacific Railroad, set up operations at Cherbourg. The Chicago, St. Paul, Minneapolis and Omaha Railway sponsored the 714th ROB in the Territory of Alaska.

In 1944, the Military Intelligence Service Language School (MISLS) for Japanese language had outgrown its facilities at Camp Savage and relocated to Fort Snelling. With the move the curriculum was expanded with Chinese. It had 125 classrooms, 160 instructors, and 3,000 students. In June 1946, the school held its 21st and last commencement at the fort. The War Department constructed scores of buildings at the fort for housing and teaching during the war. The language school was relocated to Monterey, California.

In 1943, the navy opened an air station on the north side of Wold-Chamberlain Field that existed until 1970. That area is now used by reserve units and the Minnesota Air National Guard. WWII Fort Snelling facilities covered 1,521 acres at war's end.

=== Postwar 20th century ===
The War Department decommissioned Fort Snelling a second time on 14 October 1946. Various federal agencies were allowed to request parcels of the land that made up Fort Snelling Unorganized Territory. After the army left, most of the structures fell into disrepair. In 1960, the fort was listed as a National Historic Landmark for its importance as the region's first major military post and its role in the development of the US Army.

Many acres of fort land have been lost to roads. Construction of the Mendota Bridge ran a state highway across old fort land. More fort land was lost when an Interstate 494 interchange was added as well as access roads to the International Airport, National Cemetery, VA Hospital and bridge into St. Paul.

In 1963, Fort Snelling became headquarters of United States Army Reserve 205th Infantry Brigade, which had units throughout the upper Midwest. In 1994 that ended as a part of force-structure eliminations.

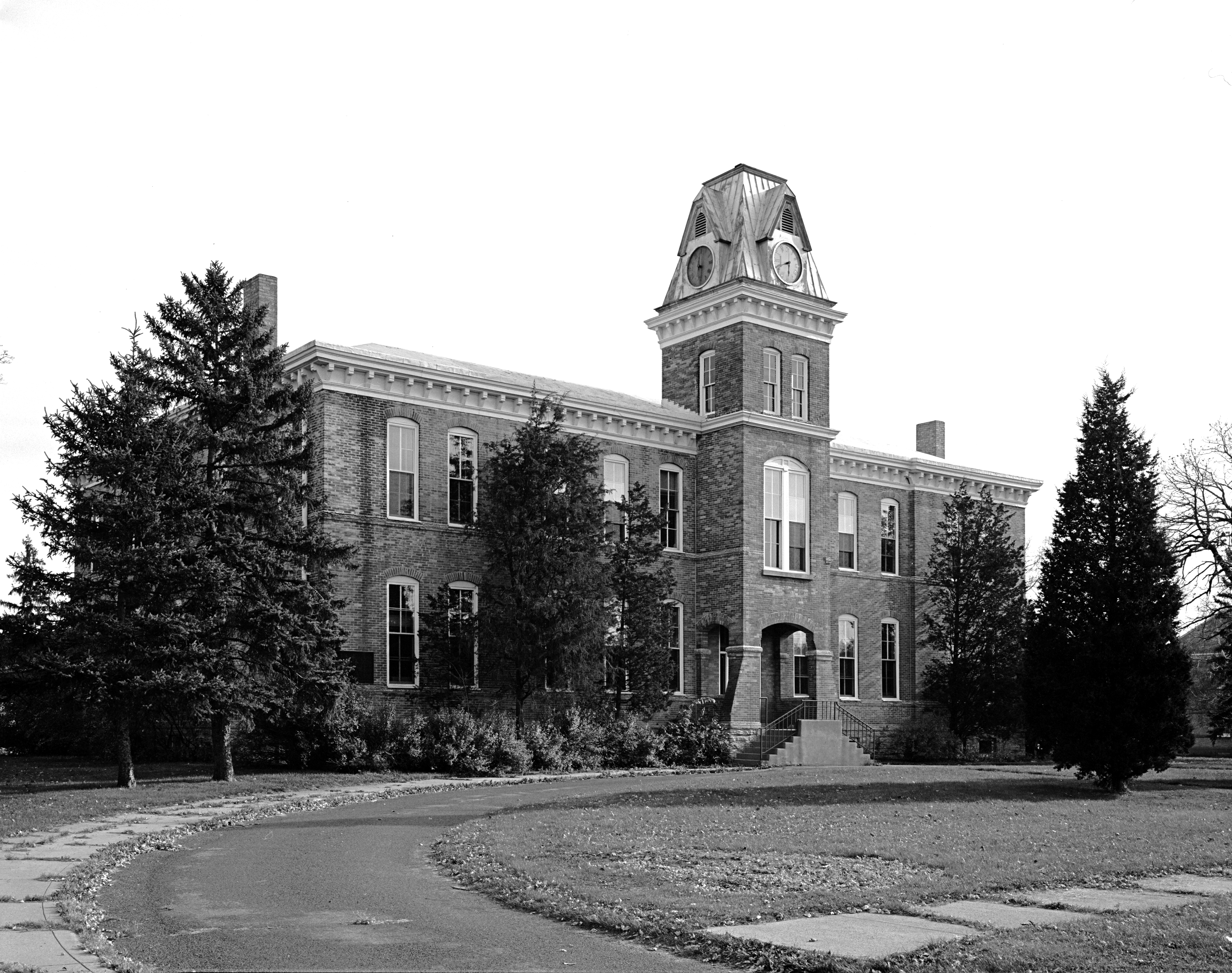
The Fort Snelling Administration Building on the Upper Post, built 1878

Starting in 1965, the fort was rebuilt to replicate its original appearance. Time and use had been hard on it. The walls, barracks, and buildings had been removed. Archaeological work was done at the site in 1957–58 and 1966–67. At that time all that remained of the original fort were the round and hexagonal towers. State archaeologists located the foundations of all that had been demolished, allowing them to pinpoint the structures they reconstructed.

The Minnesota Historical Society has made the original walled fort, or "Lower Post", an interactive interpretive center. It is staffed from spring to early fall by personnel attired in period costumes. Although restoring the original fort assured its survival, many of the buildings constructed later, composing the "Upper Post", suffered serious disrepair and neglect. Many of them have been demolished.

=== 21st century ===
In May 2006, the National Trust for Historic Preservation added Fort Snelling's Upper Post to its list of "America's Most Endangered Places". Restoration of historic Fort Snelling continues. Crews removed the flagpole from the iconic round tower and installed it in the ground.

Protesters staged a "Take Down the Fort" protest in 2010, calling for it to be returned to Dakota communities.

== Legacy ==
=== USS Fort Snelling (LSD-30) ===
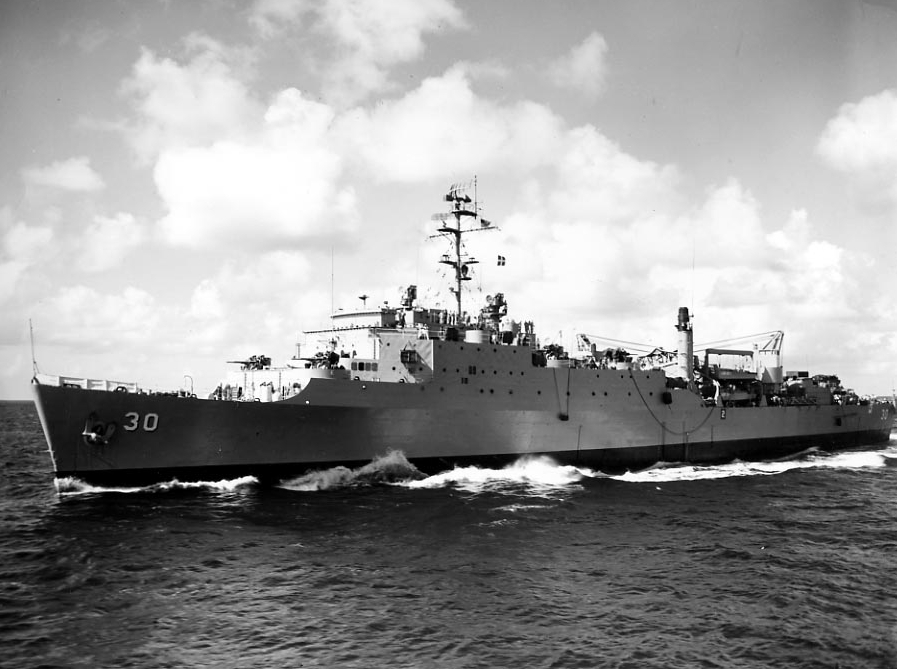
The U.S. Navy named an amphibious warfare ship, the USS Fort Snelling (LSD-30), to honor the fort.

USS Fort Snelling (LSD-30) was a Thomaston-class dock landing ship of the United States Navy. She was named after Fort Snelling at the confluence of the Minnesota and Mississippi Rivers, for many years the northernmost military post in the land of the Dakota and Ojibwe. She was the second ship assigned that name, but the construction of Fort Snelling (LSD-23) was canceled on 17 August 1945.

Fort Snelling (LSD-30) was laid down on 17 August 1953 by Ingalls Shipbuilding Corp., Pascagoula, Miss.; launched on 16 July 1954, sponsored by Mrs. Robert P. Briscoe, wife of Vice Admiral Briscoe; and commissioned on 24 January 1955, Commander H. Marvin-Smith in command.

== Gallery ==
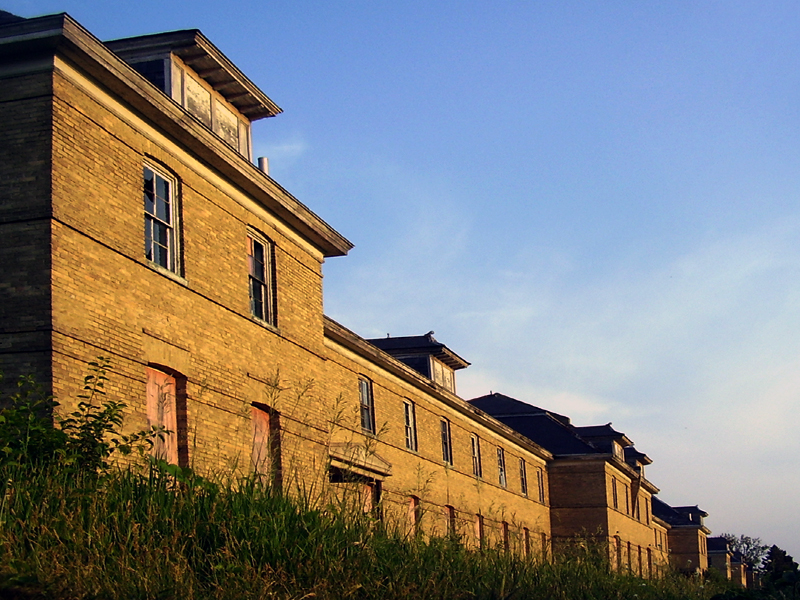
Neglected barracks in the Upper Post, last used during World War II

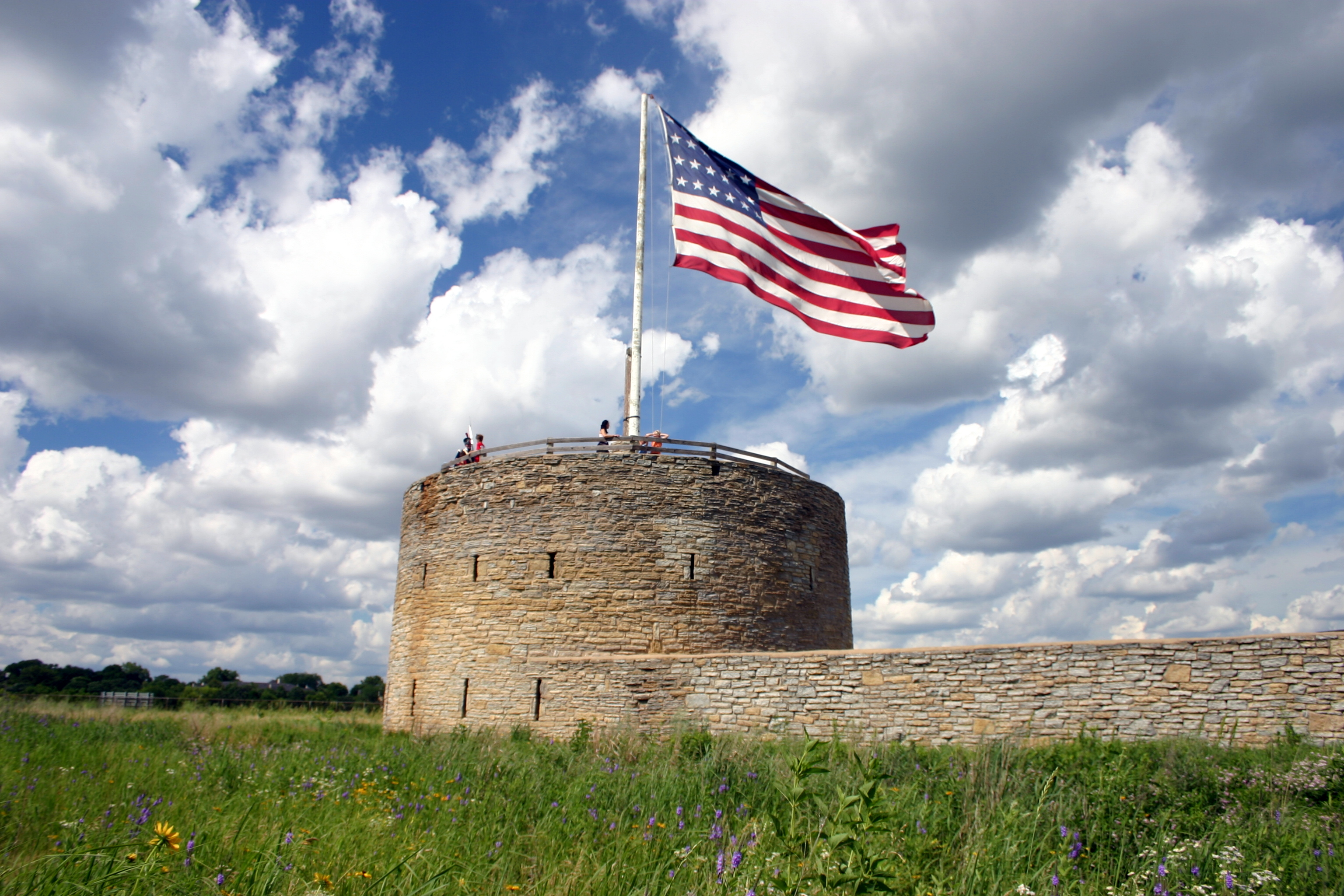
The round tower at Fort Snelling with US flag.

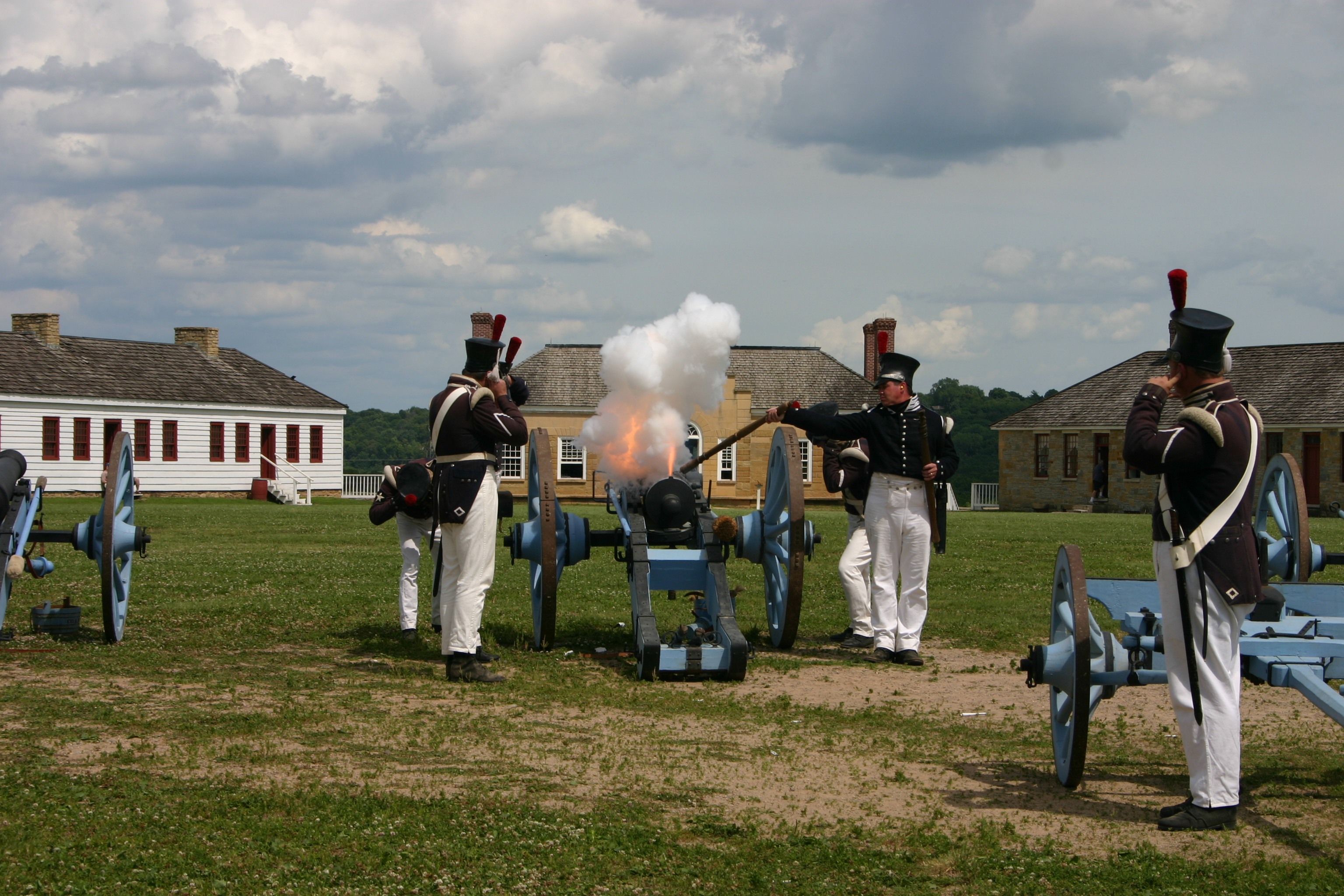
Minnesota Historical Society Historic Interpreters firing a cannon at the fort.

== See also ==
- Army on the Frontier
- Fort Snelling and the establishment of Minneapolis and Saint Paul
- Lawrence Taliaferro
- List of National Historic Landmarks in Minnesota
- List of the oldest buildings in Minnesota
- National Register of Historic Places listings in Hennepin County, Minnesota
- Slavery at Fort Snelling

== Other sources ==
- Winstead, Tim (2009). "John Taylor Wood: Man of Action, Man of Honor".
  Wilmington, North Carolina: The Cape Fear Civil War Round Table.
