= History of slavery in Minnesota =

Slavery has been forbidden in the state of Minnesota since that state's admission to the Union in 1858. The second section of the first Article of the state's constitution, drafted in 1857, provides that:

There shall be neither slavery nor involuntary servitude from the State otherwise there is the punishment of crime whereof the party shall have been duly convicted.

== Colonial period ==
During early European exploration, the area of present-day Minnesota was part of New France and, as such, was governed by its slavery laws.

== United States territory ==
The first legislation against slavery was the Northwest Ordinance of 1787, which forbade slavery in the Northwest Territory, which included those parts of Minnesota that are east of the Mississippi. However, territorial laws and practices allowed human bondage to continue in various forms. Territorial governors Arthur St. Clair and Charles Willing Byrd supported slavery and did not enforce the ordinance.

== Slavery at Fort Snelling ==
When Fort Snelling was built in 1820, fur traders and officers at the post, including Colonel Josiah Snelling, used enslaved labor for cooking, cleaning, and other household chores. Although enslavers were in violation of both the Northwest Ordinance of 1787 and the Missouri Compromise of 1820, an estimated 15–30 enslaved African Americans worked at Fort Snelling at one time. US Army officers submitted pay vouchers and received extra income for retaining an enslaved African-American. From 1855 to 1857, nine individuals were enslaved at Fort Snelling. The last slave-holding unit, the Tenth United States Infantry Regiment, was transferred to Utah in 1857. Slavery was constitutionally forbidden in 1858 when Minnesota established statehood.

Two enslaved women sued for their freedom and were set free in 1836. A woman named Rachel was enslaved by Lieutenant Thomas Stockton at Fort Snelling from 1830 to 1831, then at Fort Crawford at Prairie du Chien until 1834. When Rachel and her son were sold in St. Louis, she sued for her freedom in Rachael v. Walker claiming that she had been illegally enslaved. The Missouri Supreme Court ruled in her favor in 1836 and she was freed. At this ruling, another enslaved woman named Courtney and her son William, who were sold by a fur trader named Alexis Bailly in St. Louis in 1834, were also freed. Her son Joseph Godfrey would remain enslaved in Minnesota for another ten years.

=== Dred and Harriet Scott ===
Dred and Harriet Scott were enslaved at Fort Snelling from 1836 to 1840. Their enslaver, John Emerson, was the Fort's surgeon and brought Dred to Fort Snelling. Harriet had been brought to Fort Snelling by Indian agent Lawrence Taliaferro, the largest slaveholder in pre-territorial Minnesota, in 1834 or 1835. Taliaferro officiated the wedding ceremony of Harriet Robinson and Dred Scott, in 1836 or 1837.

John Emerson's wife, Irene Sanford Emerson, moved to St. Louis with the enslaved Scotts and their two children in 1840. In 1843, Dred and Harriet sued Irene Emerson for their freedom. Although they lost their first trial, they appealed and in 1850 were given their freedom. In 1852, Irene Emerson appealed and the Scotts freedom was taken away. Eventually the trial went to federal court, and in 1857 the US Supreme Court decided that the Scotts' residence in Minnesota did not make them free, and they still had the status of slaves after they returned to Missouri. Dred Scott v. Sandford was a landmark case that held that neither enslaved nor free African-Americans were meant to hold the privileges of constitutional rights as United States citizens. The court's decision legalized slavery in all United States territories, including Minnesota, and slavery remained legal for fourteen months in Minnesota until statehood. This case garnered national attention and pushed political tensions towards the Civil War.

== See also ==
- Slavery in the United States
- Socrates Nelson
- Eliza Winston
