= Nelson School =

- U.S. National Register of Historic Places
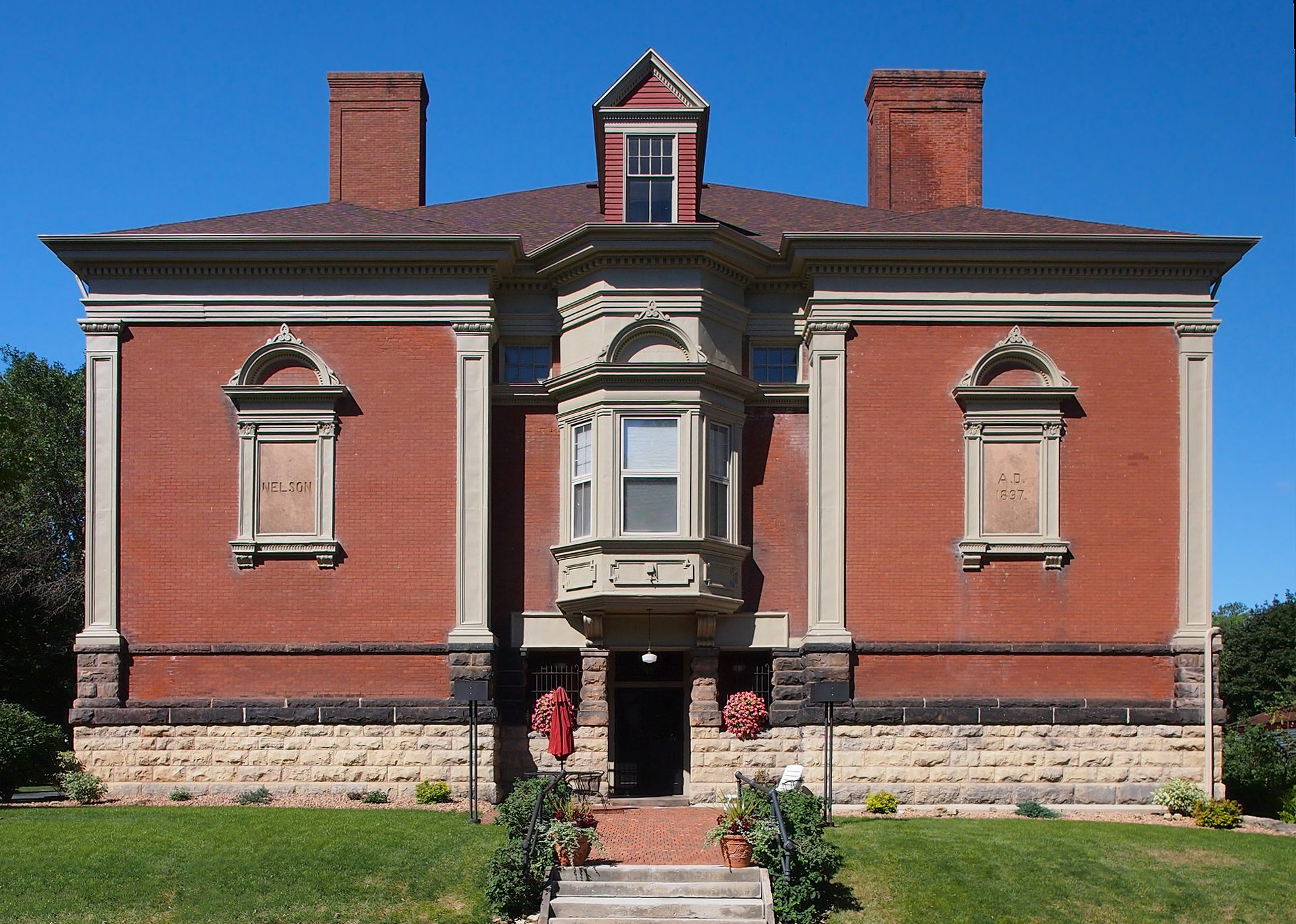
- Nelson School from the east

- Location within Minnesota Location within the United States
- Location: 1018 South 1st Street, Stillwater, Minnesota
- Coordinates: 45°2′48.2″N 92°48′14.7″W
- Area: Less than one acre
- Built: 1897
- Architect: Orff & Guilbert
- Architectural style: Neoclassical/Georgian Revival
- MPS: Washington County MRA (AD)
- NRHP reference No.: 79001257
- Designated NRHP: October 25, 1979

Nelson School is a former school building in Stillwater, Minnesota, United States, built in 1897. It was listed on the National Register of Historic Places in 1979 for its local significance in the themes of architecture and education. It was nominated for its Neoclassical/Georgian Revival architecture by Orff & Guilbert and for its status as the oldest surviving public school building in Stillwater.

== Description ==
Nelson School is a two-story building with a square footprint. It has red brick walls over a raised foundation of limestone blocks. The front façade has three distinct bays set off by pilasters. The central bay is slightly recessed with an oriel window jutting from the second story. The flanking bays bear slabs inscribed with the building's name and construction date which, like the oriel, are framed with pilasters and topped with a semicircular pediment. The central bay contains the main entrance on the ground floor and a dormer on the roof with a triangular pediment. The building's side walls have a row of ten windows on both floors, while the rear wall is blank but for an oriel window.

The building's square plan was an economical design allowing for four classrooms on each floor. Moreover, the lack of windows on the front and rear façades intentionally provided three full walls within each classroom for blackboards.

== History ==
The original Nelson School was a one-story wood-frame structure built in 1885. The school was named for Socrates Nelson, who owned the land where it was built. Opening on September 28, 1885, its student body quickly outgrew the space, so a new facility was constructed on the same site in 1897. The property's National Register nomination attributes the building to the architectural firm of Orff & Guilbert, but a more recent description credits a different partnership of Fremont D. Orff: Orff & Joralemon. Within two months of opening for classes, a fire broke out in the building and caused $5,000 (equivalent to $193,500 in 2025) worth of damage. The entire building had cost $17,000 (equivalent to $657,900 in 2025) to construct.

In addition to public education, the building provided civic meeting space. Nelson School last hosted classes in the 1950s, when the public school district converted it into administrative offices. The school district moved out completely in 1976. The vacant building, remanded to city ownership, was threatened with demolition but historic preservation efforts culminating in a court ruling prevented that fate. Local investors purchased it in 1980 and conducted a successful adaptive reuse project to convert Nelson School into a multi-unit residential building.

== See also ==
- National Register of Historic Places listings in Washington County, Minnesota
