= Socrates Nelson =

American politician (1814–1867)

Member of the Minnesota Senate from the 1st district
- In office December 7, 1859 – January 7, 1861

Personal details
- Born: January 11, 1814 Conway, Massachusetts, U.S.
- Died: May 6, 1867 (aged 53) Stillwater, Minnesota, U.S.
- Party: Democratic
- Occupation: Merchant, politician, lumberman, real estate investor
- Committees: Railroad and Railroad Bonds Special Committee; State Prison Committee

Socrates Nelson (January 11, 1814 – May 6, 1867) was an American businessman, politician, and pioneer who served one term as a Minnesota State Senator from 1859 to 1861. He was a general store owner, lumberman, and real estate speculator associated with numerous companies in the insurance and rail industries. He was involved in the establishment of the community of Stillwater, Minnesota, and was an early member of the first Independent Order of Odd Fellows lodge in Minnesota. He served on the University of Minnesota's first board of regents before being elected to the Minnesota Senate.

Nelson was a member of an 1848 committee that met in Stillwater to petition the U.S. Congress to create the Minnesota Territory, and he took part in the early organization of the Minnesota Democratic Party. He was a county treasurer, territorial auditor, and county commissioner. As a senator, he voted in favor of a failed bill to legalize bringing slaves into Minnesota temporarily and helped to repeal the Loan Amendment – intended to expedite the creation of railroad infrastructure – from the Minnesota Constitution. He was elected as a delegate for the 1864 Democratic National Convention.

After Nelson died in 1867 from tuberculosis, his achievements in Stillwater were memorialized. The Nelson School was named after him. A plaque at the Washington County Historic Courthouse commemorates his sale of the land on which the courthouse was built.

== Early life and family ==
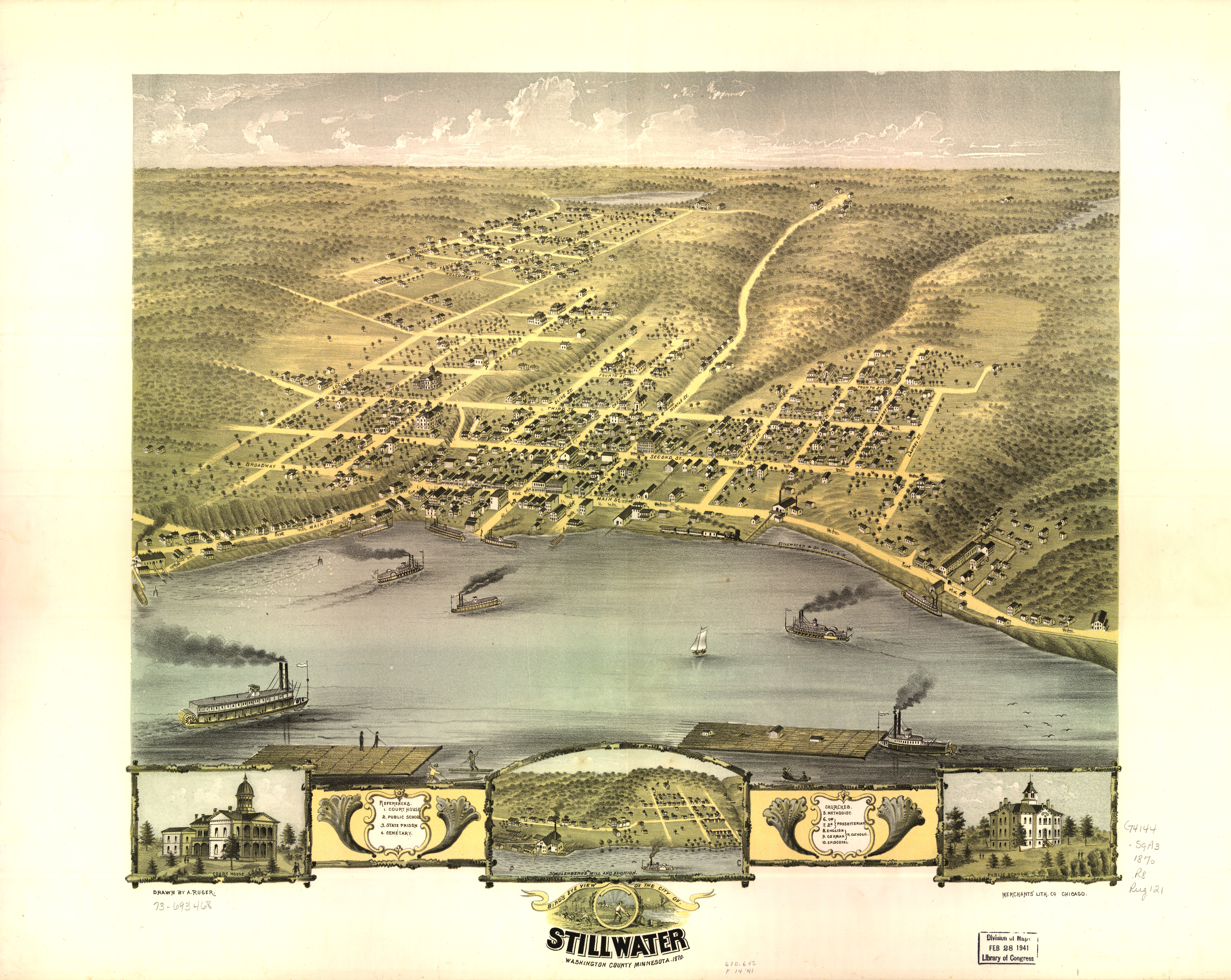
Panoramic sketch of Stillwater drawn in 1870

Socrates Nelson was born in Conway, Massachusetts, on January 11, 1814, to Socrates Nelson and Dorothy Boyden. He lived in nearby Greenfield and took a partial course at Deerfield Academy before returning to his hometown to become a merchant. When he was 25, Nelson moved to Illinois on a prospecting tour; he moved again in 1840 to St. Louis, Missouri, to sell goods and collect furs. There, he met his future business partner Levi Churchill. In early 1844, he traveled up the Mississippi River to the mouth of the Chippewa River in the Wisconsin Territory and opened a trading post at a site known as Nelson's Landing or Nelson's Point, about three miles south of Wabasha, Minnesota. The post was maintained for several years but later washed away. On October 23, he married Betsey D. Bartlett (Note: Betsey D. Bartlett is sometimes referred to as 'Betsy' and 'Bertha', and in one contemporary news source as 'Martha E.', but US census data from 1850 records her given name as 'Betsey D.') in Hennepin, Illinois.

Later in 1844, Nelson took a steamboat farther north to the recently settled town of Stillwater and opened its first general store, known as Nelson's Warehouse. (Note: Having originally opened his business in a shack in 1844, Nelson built the general store under the same roof as his Main Street home in summer 1845, located near the St. Croix by the intersection of modern-day Nelson Street and South Main Street. One source leaves room for error, calling his store "the first, or among the first, in Stillwater", and another calls both Nelson's and Walter R. Vail's the first.) Betsey joined him soon after. The Churchills remained temporarily in St. Louis, and the two parties traded goods via the Mississippi River – Nelson's furs for Churchill's merchandise. The Nelsons had twin daughters, Emma A. and Ella, on September 22, 1848. Ella died in infancy on October 23, 1849. Nelson was one of the earliest members of the Minnesota Historical Society, joining in 1849 when the organization was formed. He was among the first members initiated into the Independent Order of Odd Fellows in 1849, which became Minnesota Lodge No. 1 in Stillwater in 1852, when he was a trustee.

== Business ventures ==
Nelson was an important settler of the St. Croix River valley. When arriving in Stillwater, he initially built a store and established a mercantile business, which he ran for eleven years. Realizing that land development, rather than fur and trading, would be more prosperous, Nelson and Churchill laid claim to large tracts of land near the St. Croix River in 1845 and purchased the land from the United States General Land Office in 1849. By the summer of 1847, Nelson was shipping rafts of white pine lumber hundreds of miles downriver to St. Louis, and in the summer of 1848, he and Churchill together purchased an area of timberland. Nelson entered the lumber business in earnest on February 7, 1851, as one of the corporators of the St. Croix Boom Company organized by the Minnesota Territorial Legislature. In 1852, Nelson and associates David B. Loomis and Daniel Mears (Nelson, Loomis and Company) platted what is now Bayport. There, they erected a boarding house and a lumber mill, called the S. Nelson Lumber Company. The steam-powered sawmill operated from 1853, the year Nelson left the mercantile business, to November 1858, when the company dissolved, leaving Nelson as the owner. He operated the mill infrequently over the next ten years and sold the property in 1868.

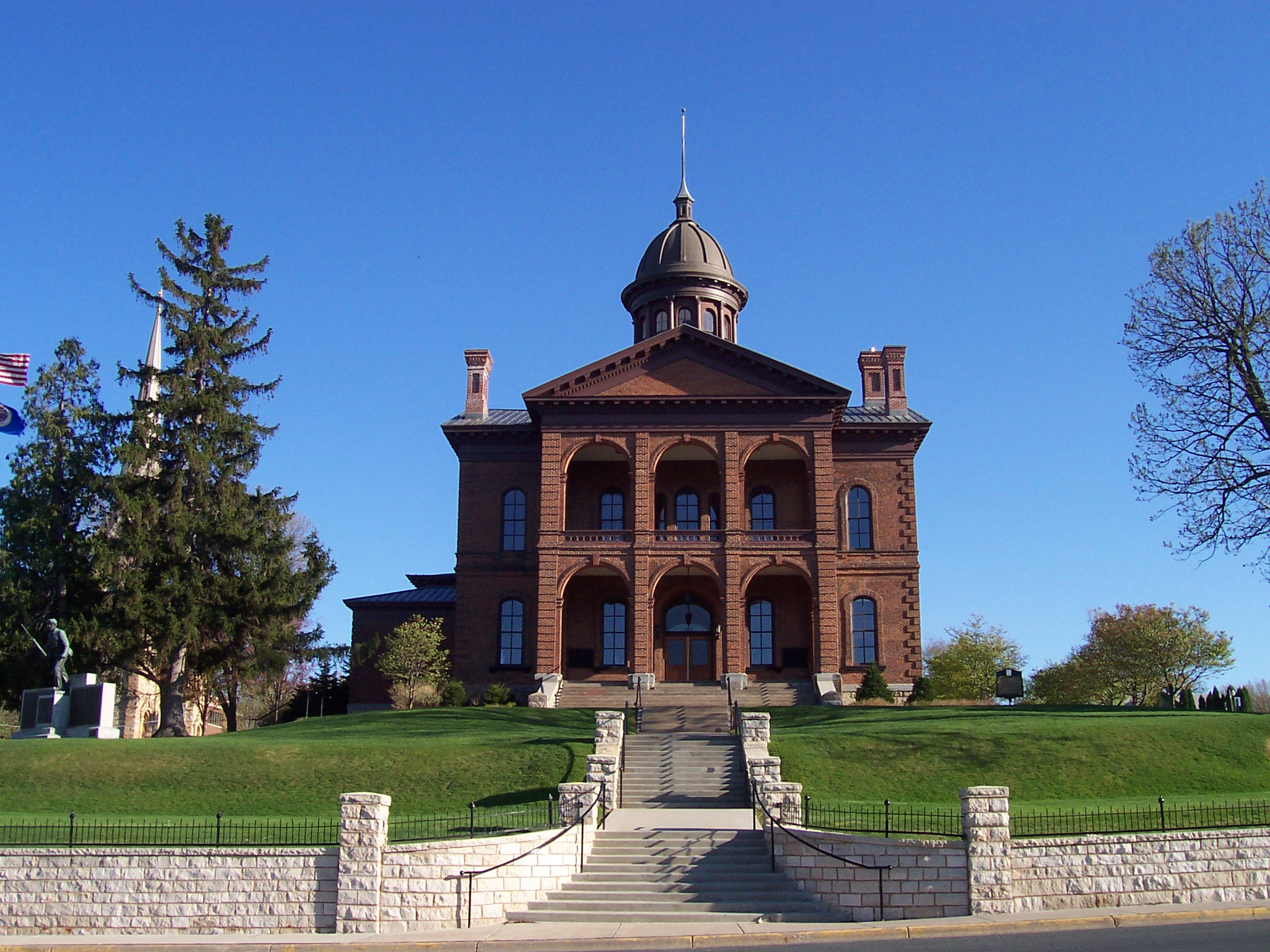
Washington County Historic Courthouse in Stillwater, Minnesota, built on land donated by Nelson and his business partner

Riding a boom in real estate speculation and soaring land prices, Nelson and Churchill deeded 40 acres (16 ha) of land in January 1857 to St. Paul real estate salesman Robert F. Slaughter, half of which Slaughter deeded in turn to Hilary B. Hancock. (Note: Hancock was the identical twin brother of 1880 Democratic presidential nominee Winfield Scott Hancock.) Along with their wives, the four platted the area of nearly 500 lots on June 15, just months before the onset of a worldwide financial crisis known as the Panic of 1857. Amid a collapsing real estate market and with speculation screeching to a halt, the value of the now-platted and mostly unsold land plummeted to practical worthlessness. Months after the Panic began, Levi Churchill died and ceded his estate to his wife Elizabeth. Demoralized by deflated land prices, Slaughter and Hancock forfeited their claim to the lots. In early April 1867, hoping to spur development and drive demand for nearby lots they owned, Nelson and Elizabeth Churchill offered to sell the city of Stillwater an entire block of land for a token amount of $5 (equivalent to $115 in 2025) with no strings attached for the construction of a courthouse. The city accepted, and the courthouse building prompted development of the area, which Nelson would not live to see.

In other business ventures, Nelson was a corporator of the Minnesota Mutual Fire Insurance Company in 1848. In 1853, he became one of the corporators of the Louisiana and Minnesota Railroad Company, (Note: No railroad was ever laid by the Louisiana and Minnesota Railroad Company. On March 5, 1869, the Minnesota Legislature transferred the benefits and powers the company had been given by the Minnesota Territorial Legislature to the Brownsville, Caledonia and State Line Railroad Company.) the St. Paul Fire and Marine Insurance Company, and the Minnesota Western Railroad Company. In 1854, a stock company consisting of Nelson and others published Stillwater's first newspaper, the St. Croix Union – a Democratic-leaning, weekly periodical which was printed until 1857. On January 27, 1867, Nelson became a corporator of the Stillwater & St. Paul Railroad.

== Political career ==
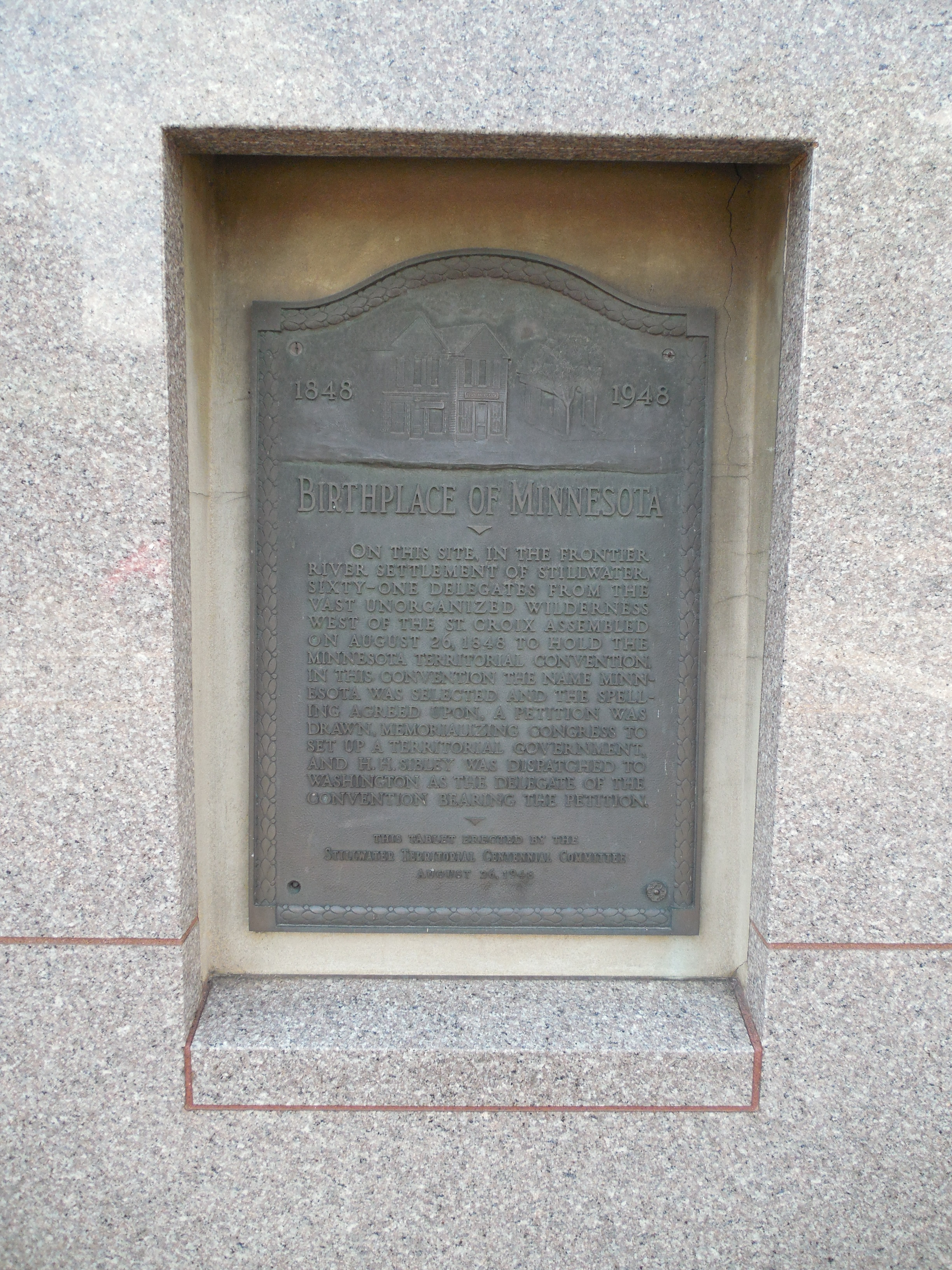
Tablet commemorating the sixty-one delegates who attended the 1848 Stillwater convention, one of whom was Nelson

In 1846, Nelson was elected treasurer for St. Croix County, Wisconsin Territory, and in 1847, he was elected treasurer and county commissioner. That year, he was appointed master in chancery for the county by Territorial Governor Henry Dodge.

When the state of Wisconsin was carved out of the Wisconsin Territory in 1848, some portions of eastern Minnesota (including Stillwater) were not accounted for, and left without representation in Washington, D.C. Nelson was one of a seven-person committee that met at the Stillwater convention on August 26, 1848, and gathered sixty-one signatures for a petition to Congress that led to the 1849 establishment of the Minnesota Territory. A group of citizens organized elections for a congressional representative from the Minnesota Territory, held on October 30, 1848. Henry Hastings Sibley became Minnesota's first representative, with 236 votes; Henry Mower Rice was second, with 122 votes; and Nelson finished third as a write-in candidate, where he received 19 unanimous votes from the precinct in which his lumber camp was located, but no votes from any other precinct.

On October 20, 1849, Nelson was involved with the organization of the Minnesota Democratic Party at a convention held in Saint Paul. That same year, he was elected treasurer for the newly formed Washington County, Minnesota Territory.

From February 1851 to February 1859, Nelson served on the University of Minnesota's first board of regents; he was part of the 1856 building committee that solicited plans for necessary buildings. He was Minnesota Territorial Auditor under Governor Willis A. Gorman from May 15, 1853, to January 17, 1854.

Nelson was a commissioner for Washington County in 1852, 1855, and 1856. In 1858, he organized Baytown Township on the south side of Stillwater. That May, he named the township of Greenfield (later renamed to Grant Township) just east of Stillwater after his former Massachusetts home.

In 1858, Nelson was nominated by the Minnesota Democratic Party as a candidate for state senator. He was elected as a Democrat from the 1st district on October 12, 1858, and served in the Minnesota Senate from 1859 to 1861. During his term in the 2nd Minnesota Legislature, he was on the Railroad and Railroad Bonds Special Committee and the State Prison Committee. As part of the committee on railroads, Nelson co-authored a report with Lucius K. Stannard on February 4, 1860, recommending the expungement of Article IX Section 10 of the Minnesota Constitution – known as the Loan Amendment. The amendment was introduced in 1858 to expedite the development of railway infrastructure and authorized a total of up to $5 million (equivalent to $179,200,000 in 2025) in loans for railroad companies. Section 10 was expunged soon thereafter during the 1860 presidential election. On March 5, 1860, he was one of five Democrats in the Minnesota Senate to vote in favor of a failed bill to legalize bringing slaves into Minnesota temporarily.

On October 12, 1860, the Democratic District Convention met and nominated Nelson for state senator from the 2nd district; Republicans nominated Joel K. Reiner, a physician who had previously served the 1st district in the 1st Minnesota Legislature. Reiner won the election held on November 6, 1860, defeating Nelson as part of a string of legislative gains for Minnesota's Republican Party.

Nelson served on the Stillwater City Council from 1863 to 1865. In 1864, he was elected as a delegate to the Democratic National Convention, where he voted for George B. McClellan.

== Later life and legacy ==
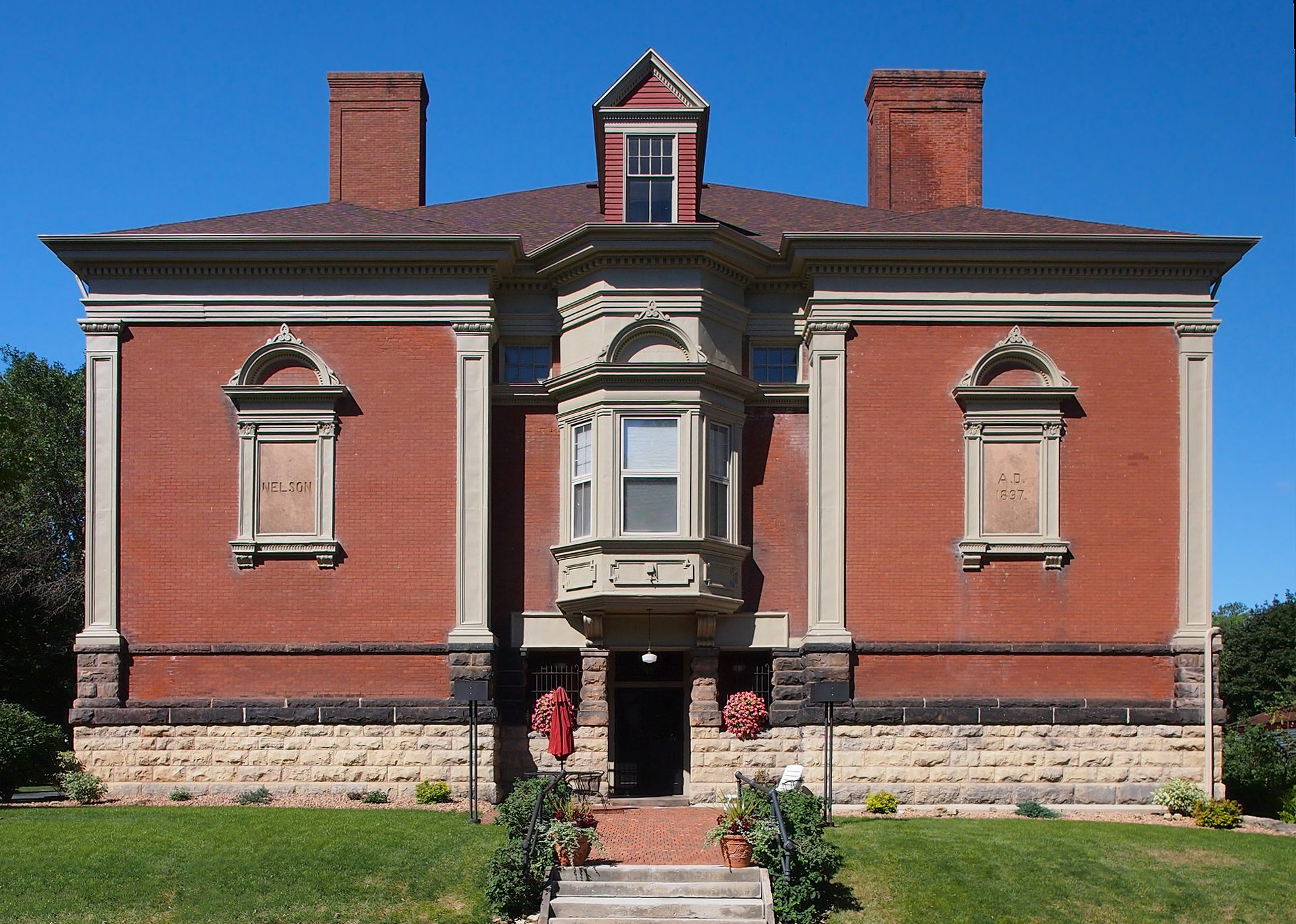
The building that housed the Nelson School, named in Socrates Nelson's honor

Nelson served as president of the Old Settlers Association in 1859 and 1866. The association accepted as members only persons who were residents of the territory before 1850; Nelson was a charter member when it was founded in 1857. In 1866, he was a trustee for the local society of Christian universalists.

In 1867, after being ill for several months and bedridden for several weeks, Nelson died of tuberculosis in Stillwater on the morning of May 6 at the age of 53. Most of the city's businesses closed that afternoon in observance of his death. Nelson's estate was valued at around $100,000 (equivalent to $2,300,000 in 2025) when he died. His daughter Emma died on November 23, 1880, and Betsey died on October 8, 1885; the estate was valued at under $1,000 (equivalent to $38,700 in 2025) by September 1901 due to extravagant spending by Emma's alcoholic husband.

A plaque on the north portico of the Washington County Historic Courthouse commemorates the date when Nelson and Churchill sold the block of land for its construction. As of 2020, the building was the longest-standing courthouse in Minnesota. Nelson Street, perpendicular to the St. Croix riverfront in Stillwater, is named for him. Nelson's shop was converted into a furniture store but torn down for lumber in March 1911. On September 28, 1885, the Nelson School, named after him, opened in Stillwater. (Note: The building where the original Nelson School stood has been converted to residential use.)

== Bibliography ==
- Boyden, Wallace C.; Boyden, Merrill N.; Boyden, Amos J. (1901). Thomas Boyden and His Descendants. Boston, MA: T.R. Marvin & Son. LCCN 02002218.
- Burnquist, Joseph A. A., ed. (1924). Minnesota and Its People. Vol. II. Chicago, IL: The S. J. Clarke Publishing Company.
- Easton, Augustus B., ed. (1909). History of the Saint Croix Valley. Vol. I. Chicago, IL: H.C. Cooper, Jr. & Co.
- Empson, Donald L. (July 2002). The West Half of the Churchill, Nelson & Slaughter Addition Residential Area, Stillwater, Washington County, Minnesota (Report). Stillwater, MN.
- Folsom, W. H. C. (1888). Edwards, E. E. (ed.). Fifty Years in the Northwest. St. Paul, MN: Pioneer Press Company. LCCN rc01001070.
- Holcombe, Return Ira (1908). Hubbard, Lucius F.; Baker, James H.; Murray, William P.; Upham, Warren (eds.). Minnesota in Three Centuries, 1655–1908. Vol. II. Mankato, MN: The Publishing Society of Minnesota. LCCN 08031149.
- Holmes, Frank R. (1908). Hubbard, Lucius F.; Baker, James H.; Murray, William P.; Upham, Warren (eds.). Minnesota in Three Centuries, 1655–1908. Vol. IV. Mankato, MN: The Publishing Society of Minnesota. LCCN 08031149.
- Lass, William E. (Summer 1997). "The Birth of Minnesota" (PDF). Minnesota History.
- Minnesota Senate (1860). Journal of the Senate of the Second Legislature of the State of Minnesota. St. Paul, MN: Newson, Moore, Foster & Co. pp. 599–600.
- Minnesota Territorial Legislature; Minnesota Supreme Court (1853). Collated Statutes of the Territory of Minnesota, and Decisions of Supreme Court. Saint Paul, MN: Joseph R. Brown, Territorial Printer. LCCN 05041406.
- Neill, Edward D. (1881). History of Washington County and the St. Croix Valley. Minneapolis, MN: North Star Publishing Company. LCCN rc01001133.
