= 2nd Minnesota Light Artillery Battery =

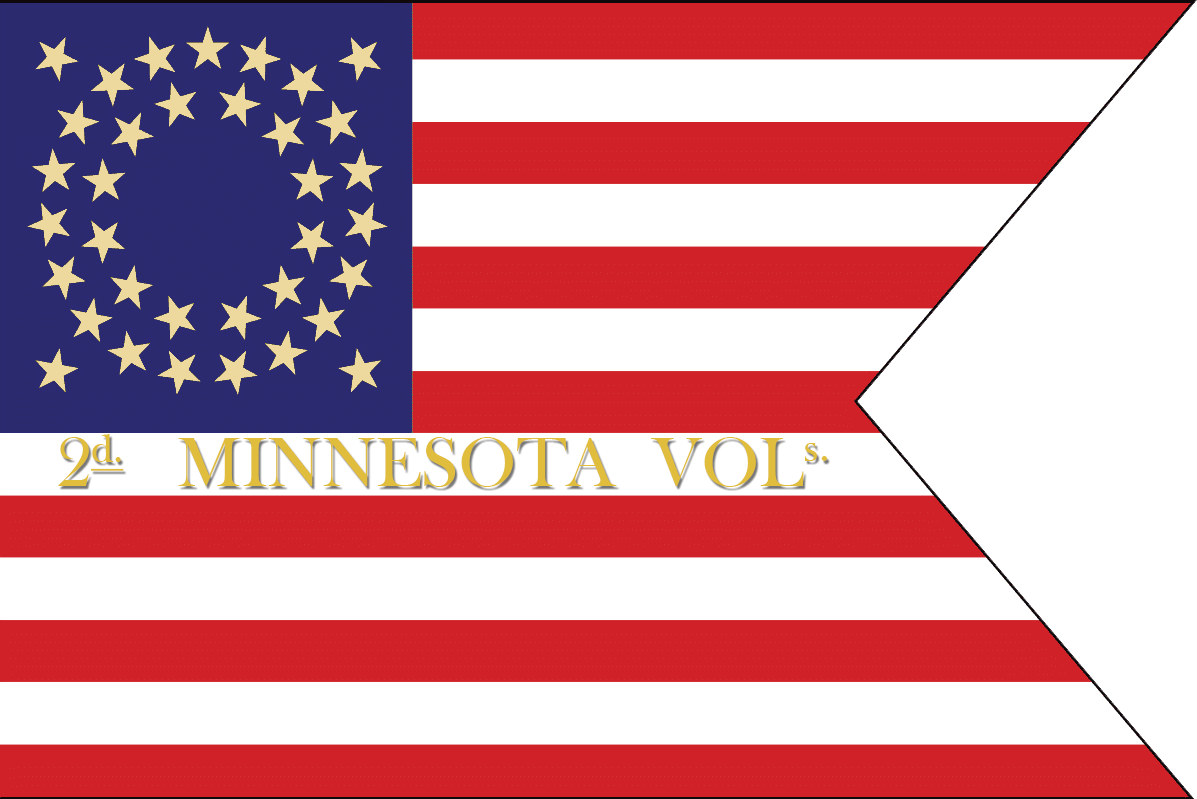
- Recreated Guidon of the Second Minnesota Light Artillery Battery 1862-1865
- Active: March 21, 1862, to August 16, 1865
- Country: United States
- Allegiance: Union
- Branch: Artillery
- Engagements: American Civil War; Battle of Perryville (1862); Battle of Stone's River (1862-63); Battle of Chickamauga (1863); Siege of Chattanooga (1865); Battle of Atlanta (1864)

2nd Minnesota Light Artillery Battery was a Minnesota USV artillery battery that served in the Union Army during the American Civil War.

The battery was mustered in at Fort Snelling, Minnesota, on March 21, 1862.

The 2nd Minnesota Light Artillery Battery was mustered out at St. Paul, Minnesota, on August 16, 1865.

== Commander ==
- Captain William A. Hotchkiss - February 14, 1862, to August 16, 1865

== Casualties and total strength ==
The 2nd Minnesota Light Artillery Battery lost 1 officer and 5 enlisted men killed in action or died of wounds received in battle and 19 enlisted men died of disease. Total fatalities were 25.

== See also ==
- List of Minnesota Civil War Units
