= 1st Minnesota Sharpshooters Company =

- Active: October 6, 1861 – July 15, 1865
- Disbanded: July 15, 1865
- Country: United States
- Branch: Infantry
- Size: Company
- Engagements: American Civil War

Commanders
- Colonel: Hiram Berdan

The 1st Minnesota Sharpshooters Company was a sharpshooter company of USV from Minnesota that served in the Union Army between October 6, 1861, and July 15, 1865, during the American Civil War.

== Service ==
The company was organized at Fort Snelling by the authority of the Secretary of War and mustered in on October 6, 1861. Straight away the 1st Minnesota Sharpshooters were given orders to make their way to Washington D.C. and report to Colonel Hiram Berdan. After reporting the company was assigned as Company "A" of the 2nd United States Sharpshooters. When their service to the 2nd U.S. Sharpshooters was completed they were transferred to the 1st Minnesota Infantry Regiment as Company "A". The 1st Minnesota Infantry Regiment was mustered out on July 15, 1865.

== Bibliography ==
- Dyer, Frederick H. (1959). A Compendium of the War of the Rebellion. New York and London. Thomas Yoseloff, Publisher. LCCN 59-12963.
