= 1st Minnesota Infantry Battalion =

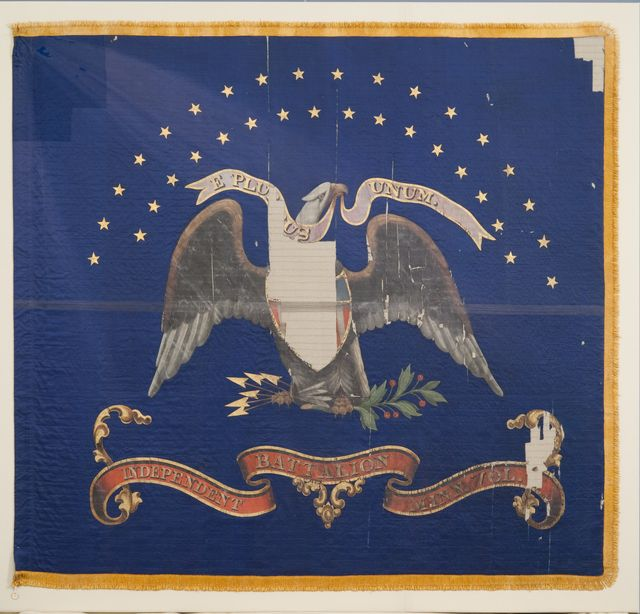
- 1st Minnesota Infantry Battalion Flag
- Active: May 1864 to July 14, 1865 (April 29, 1861 to April 2, 1864 as 1st Minnesota Infantry Regiment)
- Country: United States
- Allegiance: Union
- Branch: Infantry
- Equipment: Springfield Model 1855; Springfield Model 1861
- Engagements: American Civil War; Second Battle of Petersburg (1864); Battle of Jerusalem Plank Road (1864); First Battle of Deep Bottom (1864); Second Battle of Deep Bottom (1864); Second Battle of Ream's Station (1864); Third Battle of Petersburg (1865); Battle of Sailor's Creek (1865); Battle of Hatcher's Run (1865); Battle of Appomattox Courthouse (1865); Grand Review of the Armies (1865)

Commanders
- Notable commanders: Captain James C. Farwell; Captain Frank Houston

The 1st Minnesota Infantry Battalion was an infantry battalion that served in the Union Army in the Eastern Theater of the American Civil War.

== History ==
=== Early service ===
The 1st Minnesota Infantry Battalion was mustered into service on April 29, 1864, at Fort Snelling, Minnesota, and was originally formed by soldiers of the disbanded 1st Minnesota Infantry Regiment who had reenlisted into U.S. service. These veterans formed two companies that became the nucleus of the 1st Minnesota Battalion. They were soon joined by more companies.

=== Later service ===
In May 1864, the battalion was ordered to Washington D.C. On 1 June the battalion was temporarily consolidated with the 38th Wisconsin Infantry Regiment and assigned to the Provisional Brigade of Brigadier General John J. Abercrombie. Afterwards they moved to Virginia to join the Army of the Potomac and participate in the Siege of Petersburg under Captain James C. Farwell. On March 19, 1865, men of the 2nd Company of Minnesota Sharpshooters whose terms had not expired, transferred to the battalion. The unit then participated in the Appomattox Campaign assigned to the 1st Brigade, 2nd Division, 2nd Corps. They were commanded by Captain Frank Houston. Following Confederate General Robert E. Lee’s surrender on April 9, 1865, at Appomattox Courthouse, Virginia, the battalion took part in the Grand Review of the Army of the Potomac in Washington D.C. They were mustered out on July 14, 1865, in Jeffersonville, Indiana.

== Detailed service ==
Veterans and Recruits of 1st Minnesota Infantry Regiment organized into two Companies as 1st Minnesota Battalion Infantry at Fort Snelling, Minn., and were on duty there until May 16.

Moved to Washington, D. C., May 16–22, thence to White House May 30-June 1. Assigned to 1st Brigade, 2nd Division, 2nd Army Corps, and joined Brigade at Cold Harbor, Va., June 12. Moved to Petersburg, Va., July 12–15.

Assaults on Petersburg June 16–18. Siege of Petersburg June 16, 1864, to April 2, 1865. Jerusalem Plank Road June 22–23, 1864. Demonstration north of the James July 27–29. Deep Bottom July 27–28. Demonstration north of the James August 13–20. Strawberry Plains August 14–18. Weldon Railroad August 25. Boydton Plank Road, Hatcher's Run, October 27–29. Raid on Weldon Railroad December 7–11. Dabney's Mills, Hatcher's Run, February 5–7, 1865. Watkins' House March 25.

Appomattox Campaign March 28-April 9. Hatcher's Run, Boydton Road, March 29–31. Crow's House March 31. Sutherland Station and fall of Petersburg April 2. Pursuit of Lee April 3–9. Sailor's Creek April 6. High Bridge and Farmville April 7. Appomattox Court House April 9. Surrender of Lee and his army.

March to Washington, D. C., May 2–12. Grand Review May 23. Moved to Louisville June 6–9, and duty there till July 15. Mustered out July 15, 1865.

== See also ==
- List of Minnesota Civil War Units
- 1st Minnesota Volunteer Infantry
