= 2nd Minnesota Territorial Legislature =

Minnesota legislative session

Second Minnesota Territorial Legislature
←	1st Minnesota Territorial Legislature	3rd Minnesota Territorial Legislature	→

Overview
- Legislative body: Minnesota Territorial Legislature
- Jurisdiction: Minnesota Territory, United States
- Term: January 1, 1851 – January 7, 1852

Minnesota Territorial Council
- Members: 9 Councillors
- President: David B. Loomis
- Party control: Democratic Party

Minnesota House of Representatives
- Members: 18 Representatives
- Speaker: Michael E. Ames
- Party control: Democratic Party

The second Minnesota Territorial Legislature first convened on January 1, 1851. The 9 members of the Minnesota Territorial Council were elected during the General Election of August 1, 1849, and the 18 members of the Minnesota House of Representatives were elected during the General Election of September 2, 1850.

== Sessions ==
The territorial legislature met in a regular session from January 1, 1851 to March 31, 1851. There were no special sessions of the second territorial legislature.

== Party summary ==
Resignations and new members are discussed in the "Membership changes" section, below.

=== Council ===
	Party (Note: Known party affiliations taken from the members' profiles in Minnesota Legislators Past & Present.) (Shading indicates majority caucus)		Total	Vacant
	Democratic	Whig	Total	Vacant
End of previous Legislature	6	3	9	0
Begin	6	3	9	0
Latest voting share	67%	33%		
Beginning of the next Legislature	7	2	9	0

=== House of Representatives ===
	Party (Shading indicates majority caucus)			Total	Vacant
	Democratic	Whig	Unknown	Total	Vacant
End of previous Legislature	12	4	2	18	0
Begin	8	3	7	18	0
March 29, 1851	5	2	4	11	7
Latest voting share	45%	18%	36%		
Beginning of the next Legislature	10	3	5	18	0

== Leadership ==
President of the Council
David B. Loomis (W-Marine)

Speaker of the House
Michael E. Ames (D-Stillwater)

== Members ==
=== Council ===
Name	District	City	Party
Boal, James McClellan	03	St. Paul	Whig
Burkleo, Samuel	02	Stillwater	Whig (Note: Minnesota Legislators Past & Present does not provide information on Samuel Burkleo's party affiliation; however, Samuel Burkleo signed on to an open letter from the Whig members of the legislature published in The Minnesota Pioneer newspaper which would imply that Burkleo was a Whig.)
Forbes, William Henry	03	Saint Paul	Democratic
Loomis, David B.	04	Marine	Whig
Martin McLeod	07	Bloomington	Democratic (Note: Minnesota Legislators Past & Present does not provide information on Martin McLeod's party affiliation; however, it has been documented that McLeod was a close political ally of Democratic future-Governor Henry Hastings Sibley, which fact would imply that McLeod was a Democrat.)
Norris, James S.	01	Cottage Grove	Democratic
Olmsted, David	06	Long Prairie	Democratic
Rollins, John	05	Saint Anthony Falls	Democratic
Sturgis, William R.	06	Elk River	Democratic

=== House of Representatives ===
Name	District	City	Party
Ames, Michael E.	02	Stillwater	Democratic
Brunson, Benjamin Wetherill	03	Saint Paul	Whig
Faribault, Alexander	07	Mendota	Unknown
Ford, John A.	01	Woodbury	Democratic
Gilman, David	06	Watab	Democratic
Ludden, John Dwight	04	Marine	Whig (Note: Minnesota Legislators Past & Present does not provide information on John D. Ludden's party affiliation; however, Ludden signed on to an open letter from the Whig members of the legislature published in The Minnesota Pioneer newspaper which would imply that Ludden was a Whig.)
North, John Wesley	05	Saint Anthony Falls	Whig
Olmstead, Samuel Baldwin	06	Belle Prairie	Democratic
Patch, Edward M.	05	Saint Anthony Falls	Unknown
Ramsey, Justus Cornelius	03	Saint Paul	Whig
Randall, Benjamin H.	07	Fort Snelling	Democratic
Rice, Edmund	03	Saint Paul	Democratic
Sloan, David T.	06	Buckman	Whig (Note: Minnesota Legislators Past & Present does not provide information on David T. Sloan's party affiliation; however, Sloan signed on to an open letter from the Whig members of the legislature published in The Minnesota Pioneer newspaper which would imply that Sloan was a Whig.)
Taylor, Jesse	02	Stillwater	Whig (Note: Minnesota Legislators Past & Present does not provide information on Jesse Taylor's party affiliation; however, Taylor signed on to an open letter from the Whig members of the legislature published in The Minnesota Pioneer newspaper which would imply that Taylor was a Whig.)
Tilden, Henry L.	03	Saint Paul	Whig (Note: Minnesota Legislators Past & Present does not provide information on Henry L. Tilden's party affiliation; however, Tilden signed on to an open letter from the Whig members of the legislature published in The Minnesota Pioneer newspaper which would imply that Tilden was a Whig.)
Trask, Sylvanus	02	Stillwater	Democratic
Warren, William Whipple	06	Crow Wing	Unknown
Wells, James	01	Lake City	Democratic

== Membership changes ==
=== House of Representatives ===
District	Vacated by	Reason for change	Successor	Date successor seated
01	John A. Ford (D)	Resigned on March 29, 1851, along with six other members of the House of Representatives, in protest of the 1851 reapportionment bill, arguing that the census count was incorrect.	Remained vacant	
06	David Gilman (D)	Resigned on March 29, 1851, along with six other members of the House of Representatives, in protest of the 1851 reapportionment bill, arguing that the census count was incorrect.	Remained vacant	
05	John W. North (W)	Resigned on March 29, 1851, along with six other members of the House of Representatives, in protest of the 1851 reapportionment bill, arguing that the census count was incorrect.	Remained vacant	
05	Edward M. Patch (?)	Resigned on March 29, 1851, along with six other members of the House of Representatives, in protest of the 1851 reapportionment bill, arguing that the census count was incorrect.	Remained vacant	
03	Edmund Rice (D)	Resigned on March 29, 1851, along with six other members of the House of Representatives, in protest of the 1851 reapportionment bill, arguing that the census count was incorrect.	Remained vacant	
06	David T. Sloan (?)	Resigned on March 29, 1851, along with six other members of the House of Representatives, in protest of the 1851 reapportionment bill, arguing that the census count was incorrect.	Remained vacant	
06	William Whipple Warren (?)	Resigned on March 29, 1851, along with six other members of the House of Representatives, in protest of the 1851 reapportionment bill, arguing that the census count was incorrect.	Remained vacant	

== Notes ==
Preceded by First Minnesota Territorial Legislature	Second Minnesota Territorial Legislature; 1851	Succeeded by Third Minnesota Territorial Legislature
