= 1st Minnesota Territorial Legislature =

Minnesota legislative session

First Minnesota Territorial Legislature
←	5th Wisconsin Territorial Assembly	2nd	→

Overview
- Legislative body: Minnesota Territorial Legislature
- Jurisdiction: Minnesota Territory, United States
- Term: September 3, 1849 – January 1, 1851

Minnesota Territorial Council
- Members: 9 Councillors
- President: David Olmsted
- Party control: Democratic Party

Minnesota House of Representatives
- Members: 18 Representatives
- Speaker: Joseph W. Furber
- Party control: Democratic Party

The 1st Minnesota Territorial Legislature first convened on September 3, 1849. The 9 members of the Minnesota Territorial Council and the 18 members of the Minnesota House of Representatives were elected during the General Election of August 1, 1849.

== Sessions ==
The territorial legislature met in a regular session from September 3, 1849, to November 1, 1849. There were no special sessions of the first territorial legislature.

== Party summary ==
=== Council ===
	Party (Note: Known party affiliations taken from the members' profiles in Minnesota Legislators Past & Present.) (Shading indicates majority caucus)		Total	Vacant
	Democratic	Whig	Total	Vacant
Begin	6	3	9	0
Latest voting share	67%	33%		
Beginning of the next Legislature	6	3	9	0

=== House of Representatives ===
	Party (Shading indicates majority caucus)			Total	Vacant
	Democratic	Whig	Unknown	Total	Vacant
Begin	12	4	2	18	0
Latest voting share	67%	22%	11%		
Beginning of the next Legislature	8	3	7	18	0

== Leadership ==
President of the Council
David Olmsted (D-Long Prairie)

Speaker of the House
Joseph W. Furber (W-Cottage Grove)

== Members ==
=== Council ===
Name	District	City	Party
Boal, James McClellan	03	St. Paul	Whig
Burkleo, Samuel	02	Stillwater	Whig (Note: Minnesota Legislators Past & Present does not provide information on Samuel Burkleo's party affiliation; however, Samuel Burkleo signed on to an open letter from the Whig members of the legislature published in The Minnesota Pioneer newspaper which would imply that Burkleo was a Whig.)
Forbes, William Henry	03	Saint Paul	Democratic
Loomis, David B.	04	Marine	Whig
Martin McLeod	07	Bloomington	Democratic (Note: Minnesota Legislators Past & Present does not provide information on Martin McLeod's party affiliation; however, it has been documented that McLeod was a close political ally of Democratic future-Governor Henry Hastings Sibley, which fact would imply that McLeod was a Democrat.)
Norris, James S.	01	Cottage Grove	Democratic
Olmsted, David	06	Long Prairie	Democratic
Rollins, John	05	Saint Anthony Falls	Democratic
Sturgis, William R.	06	Elk River	Democratic

=== House of Representatives ===
Name	District	City	Party
Babcock, Lorenzo A.	06	Sauk Rapids	Whig
Bailly, Alexis	07	Mendota	Democratic
Black, Mahlon	02	Stillwater	Democratic
Brunson, Benjamin Wetherill	03	Saint Paul	Whig
Dewey, John J.	03	Saint Paul	Democratic
Dugas, William	05	Little Canada	Democratic
Furber, Joseph Warren	01	Cottage Grove	Whig
Holmes, Thomas A.	06	Sauk Rapids	Democratic
Jackson, Henry	03	Saint Paul	Democratic
Johnson, Parsons King	03	Saint Paul	Democratic
Marshall, William Rainey	05	Saint Anthony Falls	Democratic
Morrison, Allan	06	Crow Wing	Democratic
Pond, Gideon H.	07	Oak Grove	Unknown
Russell, Jeremiah	06	Crow Wing	Unknown
Setzer, Henry N.	04	Stillwater	Democratic
Trask, Sylvanus	02	Stillwater	Democratic
Wells, James	01	Lake City	Democratic
Wilkinson, Morton Smith	02	Stillwater	Whig

== Notes ==
Preceded by None	First Minnesota Territorial Legislature; 1849	Succeeded by Second Minnesota Territorial Legislature
