= David Gilman (Minnesota pioneer) =

American politician, businessman, and farmer

Member of the Minnesota Territorial House of Representatives
- In office January 1, 1851 – March 29, 1851

Personal details
- Born: April 29, 1812 Saratoga County, New York
- Died: May 9, 1885 (aged 73) Watab, Minnesota
- Party: Democratic
- Occupation: Farmer, businessman

David Gilman (April 29, 1812 – May 9, 1885) was an American politician, businessman, and farmer who served in the Minnesota Territorial House of Representatives from January 1, 1851, until he resigned two months later on March 29 in protest of a reapportionment bill along with six other members.

== Biography ==
=== Early life ===
David Gilman was born in Saratoga County, New York, on April 29, 1812. At six months old, his family moved to Orange County, Vermont, where he resided until adulthood. In 1836, Gilman moved to Kalamazoo, Michigan, and traded horses there. He was Kalamazoo's first marshal, appointed on April 28, 1843 upon its incorporation as a village, and served in that position for six years. He also helped organize the Kalamazoo Fire Department.

=== Life in Minnesota ===
In 1848, Gilman joined the fur trade and moved his family to Minnesota, settling in Mendota for around a year. He opened up a trading post near Sauk Rapids before moving to Watab in 1849, where he resided for all his life. Upon moving to Watab, he immediately constructed a hotel and a farm, believed to be the first farm in Benton County. That same year, Governor Alexander Ramsey appointed Gilman as the sheriff of Benton County, which he was later popularly elected to and served for four years. That year he also began advocating to William R. Sturgis and Samuel Burkleo for the construction of a territorial road from Banfill Tavern to Crow Wing County. On October 27, he and Samuel Baldwin Olmstead were appointed commissioners in charge of the construction of the road. He also was noted to have served as county commissioner and chairman for numerous terms. In 1850, Gilman opened the town's general store. In 1853, he was appointed the postmaster of Watab, serving in the position intermittently for the remainder of his life.

Gilman was elected to the Minnesota Territorial House of Representatives on September 12, 1850. The 2nd session assembled on January 1, 1851, and was adjourned on March 31. Gilman, along with fellow representatives John A. Ford, David T. Sloan, William Whipple Warren, Edward M. Patch, John W. North, and Edmund Rice, resigned his seat on March 29 following the passage of an apportionment bill. The group raised objection to the result of the bill, which was ostensibly based on findings from the 1850 United States census. The group contended that the apportionment could not be correct, citing that Benton County, which had 4,000 acres of cultivated land, had half the representation of Pembina County, which had 70 acres of cultivated land under its jurisdiction, about half of which under the control of one man. Despite their fierce opposition, the bill passed, prompting their immediate resignation. He was also a delegate at the territory's constitutional convention in 1857 as a member of the Democratic Party (Note: The Minnesota Legislative Manual lists his name as "Daniel Gilman." His official biography on the Minnesota Legislature website lists Daniel as an alternative name.) and was noted to have advocated for the interests of education and schooling. Gilman died on May 9, 1885.

== Personal life ==
Gilman married Nancy W. Lamb, of Woodstock, Vermont, on September 21, 1844, in Augusta, Michigan. Together, they had five children.
