= Maple Island =

Maple Island can mean:

- Maple Island (Lake Superior), island in Lake Superior
- Maple Island (Rideau River), island in the Rideau River
- Maple Island, a community in Whitestone, Ontario
- Maple Island, Washington County, Minnesota
- Maple Island, Freeborn County, Minnesota
- A fictional island in MapleStory
