= Benjamin Brunson House =

Historic house in Minnesota, United States

- U.S. National Register of Historic Places
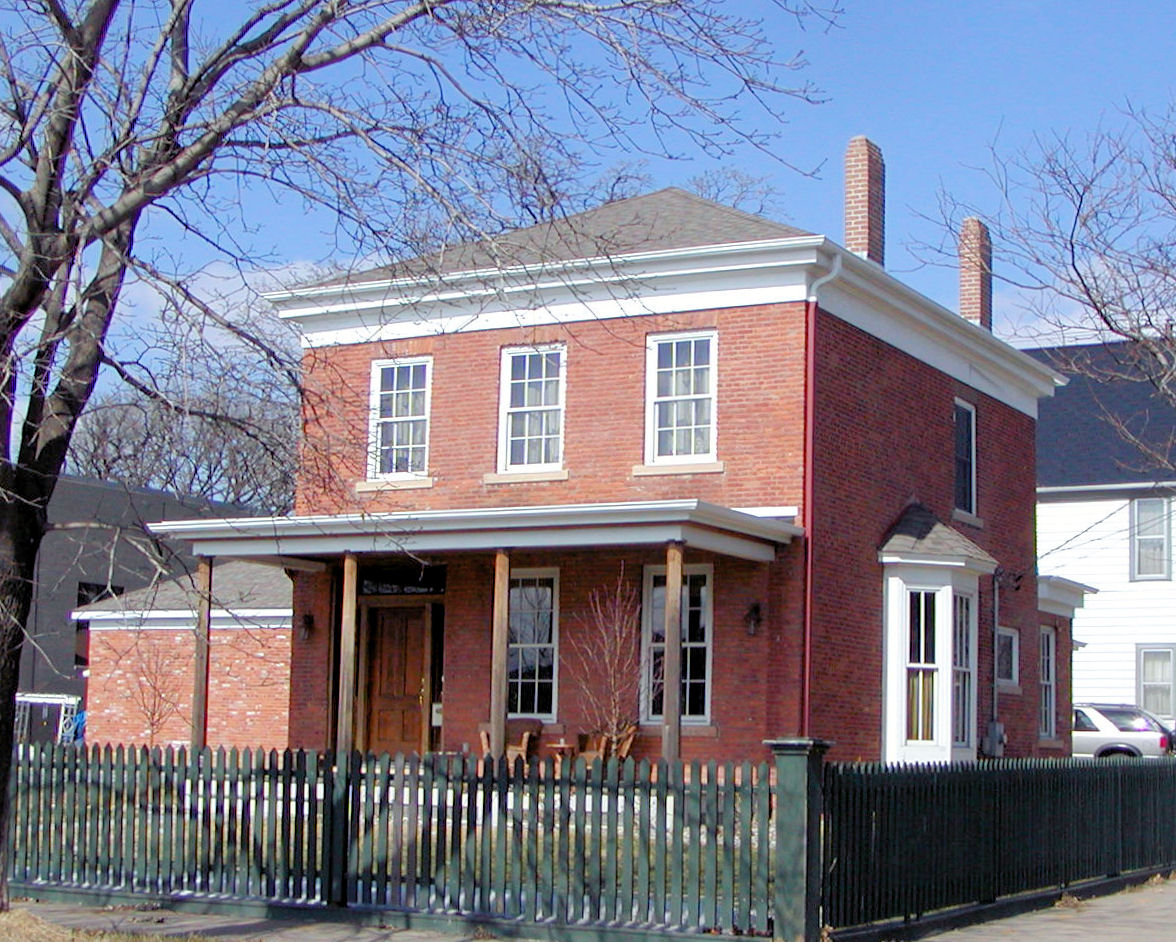

- Location within Minnesota Location within the United States
- Location: 485 Kenny Rd., Saint Paul, Minnesota
- Coordinates: 44°57′27″N 93°4′48″W
- Built: 1855
- Architectural style: Federal
- NRHP reference No.: 75001007
- Added to NRHP: May 12, 1975

The Benjamin Brunson House is one of the oldest houses remaining in Saint Paul, Minnesota it was built ca. 1856 in the area known as "railroad island," being surrounded by tracks. It is listed on the National Register of Historic Places.

Benjamin Brunson was born in 1823 in Detroit, Michigan. His father, the Rev. Alfred Brunson, was an itinerant Methodist preacher who traveled a "circuit district" along the Mississippi River between Rock Island, Illinois to Saint Anthony Falls. The elder Brunson made his permanent residence in Prairie du Chien, Wisconsin. In 1847, Benjamin Brunson came to the area to assist his brother, Ira, in making the first plat of the city of Saint Paul. Ira had led a number of soldiers from Fort Snelling in driving a number of squatters off the military reservation and down to the present site of the city, which was first named "Pig's Eye" after its founder Pierre "Pig's Eye" Parrant. The first plat is credited to Benjamin, and he surveyed many other additions to Saint Paul and prepared plats for neighboring communities in Minnesota. Brunson also served in the first Minnesota Territorial Legislature and served as a justice of the peace, a superintendent of mail carriers, a merchant at the Old Steamboat Landing, and as a civil engineer for the Lake Superior and Mississippi Railroad. He built his house in 1855 in Brunson's Addition to the City of Saint Paul, which was a semi-rural area at the time but is now within an inner-city warehouse and industrial district. He lived in Saint Paul until his death in 1898.
