= David Olmsted =

American politician

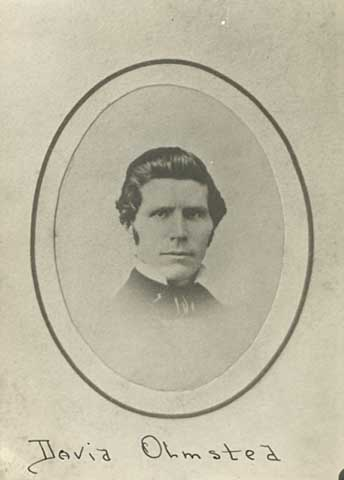

1st President of the Minnesota Territorial Council
- In office September 4, 1849 – January 1, 1851
- Preceded by: Office created (Samuel Burkleo as President pro tempore)
- Succeeded by: David B. Loomis

Member of the Minnesota Territorial Council from the 6th District
- In office September 3, 1849 – January 6, 1852 Serving with William R. Sturgis
- Preceded by: Office created
- Succeeded by: District eliminated

Mayor of Saint Paul, Minnesota
- In office 1854–1855
- Preceded by: Office created (Bushrod Lott as Town President)
- Succeeded by: Alexander Ramsey

Personal details
- Born: May 5, 1822 Fairfax, Vermont, U.S.
- Died: February 2, 1861 (aged 38) Franklin County, Vermont, U.S.
- Party: Democratic

David Olmsted (May 5, 1822 – February 2, 1861) was the fourth mayor of St. Paul, Minnesota and first president of the Minnesota Territorial Council. He was a Democrat.

== Career ==
He was born in Fairfax, Vermont, and spent many years as a trader with the Winnebago Indians near Fort Atkinson, Iowa, and at Long Prairie, Minnesota, in 1848 before settling in St. Paul in 1853. Olmsted served in the first Iowa Constitutional Convention of 1846; he then served in the Minnesota Territorial Legislature in the Minnesota Territorial Council in 1849 and 1851. He also edited the Minnesota Democrat, a frontier newspaper. After the city's charter was written in 1854, he was elected the city's first mayor and served one term. He was replaced by Alexander Ramsey. His wife was named Stevens, they had two children. He left Minnesota because of failing health, dying at his mother's house in Vermont.

== Minnesota Territorial Council ==
The 1st Minnesota Territorial Legislature convened on September 3, 1849. The first act of business for the Territorial Council was to select a president pro tempore. Samuel Burkleo was elected on Olmsted's motion.

The following day, Olmsted received 5 votes out of 9 to be elected the permanent president of the Council. He recited the first recorded address to the Minnesota Territorial Council:

Gentlemen: In accepting the station which your partiality has called me to occupy, my first emotions are to thank you heartily for the honor which you have thus unexpectedly conferred upon me. At the same time, however, I beg leave candidly to assure you that I had hoped that your choice would have fallen upon some one of your number whose talents and experience I know, render them better qualified than myself to preside over the deliberations of this Council.

Possessing but little knowledge in legislation, and but a limited knowledge of parliamentary practice, it is but natural that I should have felt some hesitation in accepting a post where the responsibilities are so great, and the duties so embarrassing, and were it not for the reliance which I place upon your generous assistance and forbearance, I should certainly feel it my duty to decline the honor which you have so magnanimously proffered me.

In view of the high responsibilities devolving upon the Chair, it will not, I trust, be expected, that I shall on all occasions, be able to discharge my duties entirely satisfactory to you all, and should errors occur, as they undoubtedly will, I claim the right to throw myself upon your indulgence, fully assured that you will ever be ready to assist, and if necessary, to forgive.

Believing that an honor of this character should neither be sought nor avoided, I feel myself at liberty to accept this appointment, and in conclusion, will again tender you my thanks for this flattering demonstration of your kindness.

— David Olmsted, The Minnesota Pioneer

The following day, committees were appointed. Olmsted, as president, would serve on none during his first term.

== Legacy ==
Olmsted County, Minnesota, is named in his honor.
