= May Township, Washington County, Minnesota =

May Township, Minnesota
- Township
- Location within the state of Minnesota May Township, Minnesota (the United States)
- Coordinates: 45°9′59″N 92°50′5″W
- Country: United States
- State: Minnesota
- County: Washington

Area
  - Total: 37.6 sq mi (97.4 km^{2})
  - Land: 35.3 sq mi (91.4 km^{2})
  - Water: 2.3 sq mi (6.0 km^{2})
- Elevation: 912 ft (278 m)

Population (2020)
  - Total: 2,670
- Time zone: UTC-6 (Central (CST))
  - Summer (DST): UTC-5 (CDT)
- Area code: 651
- FIPS code: 27-41120
- GNIS feature ID: 0664932
- Website: https://www.townofmay.org/

May Township is a township in Washington County, Minnesota, United States. The population was 2,670 at the 2020 census.

May Township was organized in 1893, and named for Morgan May, an English settler.

== Geography ==
According to the United States Census Bureau, the township has an area of 37.6 square miles (97.4 km^{2}), of which 35.3 square miles (91.4 km^{2}) is land and 2.3 square miles (6.0 km^{2}) (6.14%) is water. Minnesota State Highway 95 serves as a main route in the township.

The unincorporated communities of Arcola and Maple Island are both in May Township. The township contains two properties listed on the National Register of Historic Places, the 1847 John and Martin Mower House and Arcola Mill Site and the 1922 Benjamin B. Sheffield House.

== Demographics ==
As of the census of 2000, there were 2,928 people, 1,007 households, and 842 families residing in the township. The population density was 82.9 inhabitants per square mile (32.0/km^{2}). There were 1,102 housing units at an average density of 31.2/sq mi (12.1/km^{2}). The racial makeup of the township was 97.75% White, 0.10% African American, 0.31% Native American, 0.75% Asian, 0.48% from other races, and 0.61% from two or more races. Hispanic or Latino of any race were 1.26% of the population.

There were 1,007 households, of which 42.4% had children under 18 living with them, 75.9% were married couples living together, 4.6% had a female householder with no husband present, and 16.3% were non-families. 12.7% of all households were made up of individuals, and 3.8% had someone living alone who was 65 years of age or older. The average household size was 2.90 and the average family size was 3.19.

In the township the population was spread out, with 29.0% under 18, 5.5% from 18 to 24, 25.4% from 25 to 44, 32.5% from 45 to 64, and 7.6% who were 65 or older. The median age was 41. For every 100 females, there were 103.1 males. For every 100 females 18 and over, there were 102.9 males.

The median income for a household was $80,374, and the median income for a family was $84,953. Males had a median income of $58,355 versus $41,492 for females. The per capita income was $32,765. About 0.8% of families and 2.1% of the population were below the poverty line, including 3.0% of those under 18 and 2.4% of those 65 or over.
