= Thomas P. Burnett =

American politician (1800–1846)

Thomas Pendleton Burnett
- Born: September 3, 1800; Pittsylvania County, Virginia, U.S.
- Died: November 5, 1846; Grant County, Wisconsin, U.S.
- Occupation: Politician
- Relatives: Alfred Brunson (father-in-law); Ira B. Brunson (brother-in-law)

Thomas Pendleton Burnett (September 3, 1800 – November 5, 1846) was a United States politician in the Wisconsin Territory.

== Biography ==
Burnett was born to John and Judith Burnett on September 3, 1800, in Pittsylvania County, Virginia. He pursued a career as a lawyer, and was present at the surrender of Black Hawk and the end of the Black Hawk War. On December 29, 1836, Burnett married Lucia Maria Brunson. In 1835 he served as president of the Seventh Michigan Territorial Council (the Rump Council). In 1838, Burnett ran for Wisconsin Territorial Congressional Delegate and lost. He then was appointed reporter of the Wisconsin Territorial Supreme Court. In 1845–1846, Burnett served in the Wisconsin Territorial House of Representatives of the Wisconsin Territorial Legislature. He then served in the first Wisconsin Constitutional Convention of 1846.

A Methodist, he married Lucia Maria Brunsom on December 29, 1836. Burnett died of "bilious fever" (typhoid fever) on November 5, 1846, in Grant County, Wisconsin. He had been called home to attend to his family, which was ill with the disease; his mother died a few days before him, and his wife a few hours after him. Burnett County, Wisconsin is named after him.
