= Fort Crawford =

- Second Fort Crawford Military Hospital
- U.S. National Register of Historic Places
- U.S. National Historic Landmark
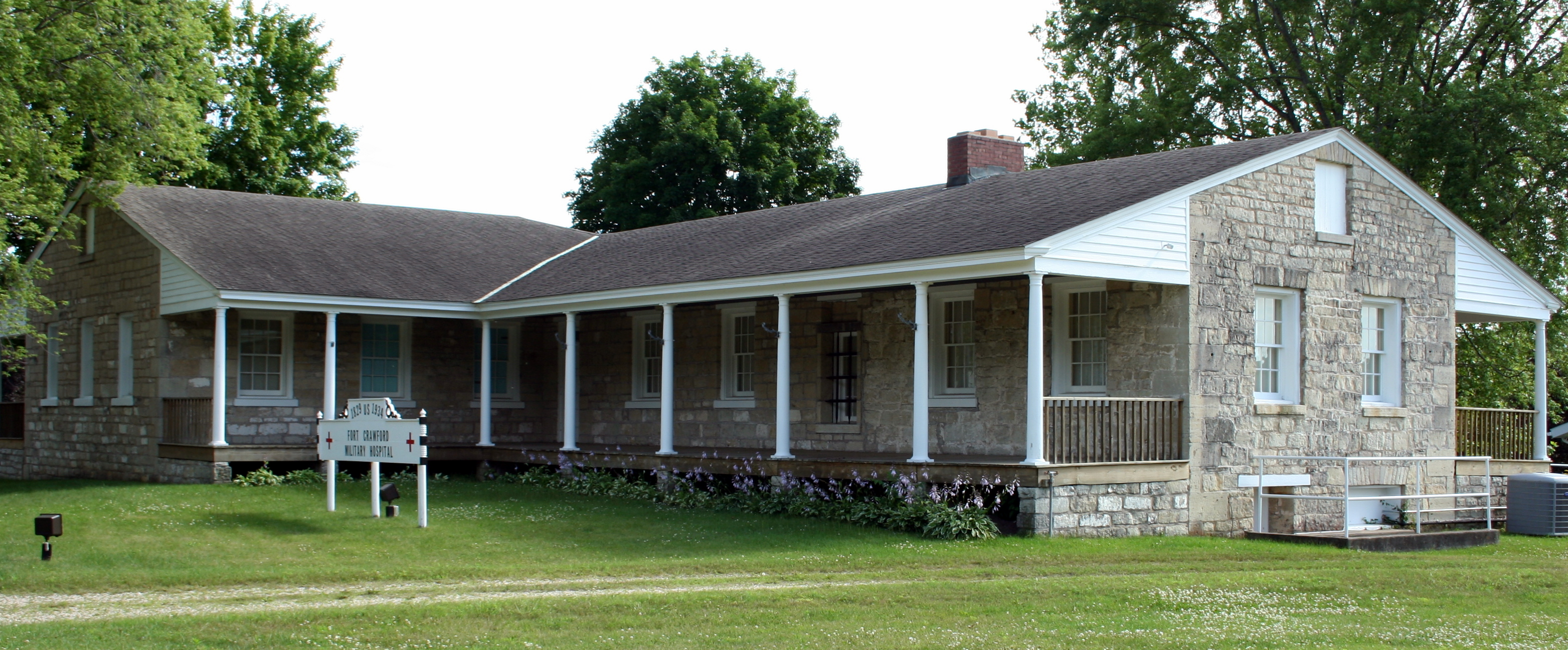
- Fort Crawford Museum in 2009

- Location within Wisconsin Location within the United States
- Interactive map showing the location of Fort Crawford
- Location: Rice Street and South Beaumont Rd; Prairie du Chien, Wisconsin
- Coordinates: 43°2′37″N 91°8′49″W
- NRHP reference No.: 66000121

Significant dates
- Added to NRHP: October 15, 1966
- Designated NHL: October 9, 1960

Fort Crawford was an outpost of the United States Army located in Prairie du Chien, Wisconsin, during the 19th century.

The army's occupation of Prairie du Chien spanned the existence of two fortifications, both of them named Fort Crawford. The first of was occupied from 1816 to 1832, the second from 1832 to 1856. Both of the forts formed part of a string of fortifications along the upper Mississippi River that also included Fort Snelling near Saint Anthony Falls in Minnesota, and Fort Armstrong in Rock Island, Illinois. Fort Crawford was also associated with a string of forts built along the Fox-Wisconsin Waterway, which included Fort Winnebago in Portage, Wisconsin and Fort Howard in Green Bay, Wisconsin.

The site of the second fort has been preserved and holds the Fort Crawford Museum, located in the Second Fort Crawford Military Hospital. This is a 1930s reconstruction of the hospital serving the second fort. This building contains the only surviving building fragments of either fort, and it was designated a U.S. National Historic Landmark in 1960.

== First Fort Crawford ==
The U.S. Army established a presence in Prairie du Chien during the War of 1812, when it built Fort Shelby on St. Feriole Island in the Mississippi River, which was part of the town separated by a marshy bayou. On July 19, 1814, Fort Shelby was captured by British forces and renamed Fort McKay. The British would continue to occupy Prairie du Chien until 1815, after the Treaty of Ghent restored the pre-war border between the United States and British Canada. When the British retreated from the city, they burned Fort McKay rather than give it back to the Americans.

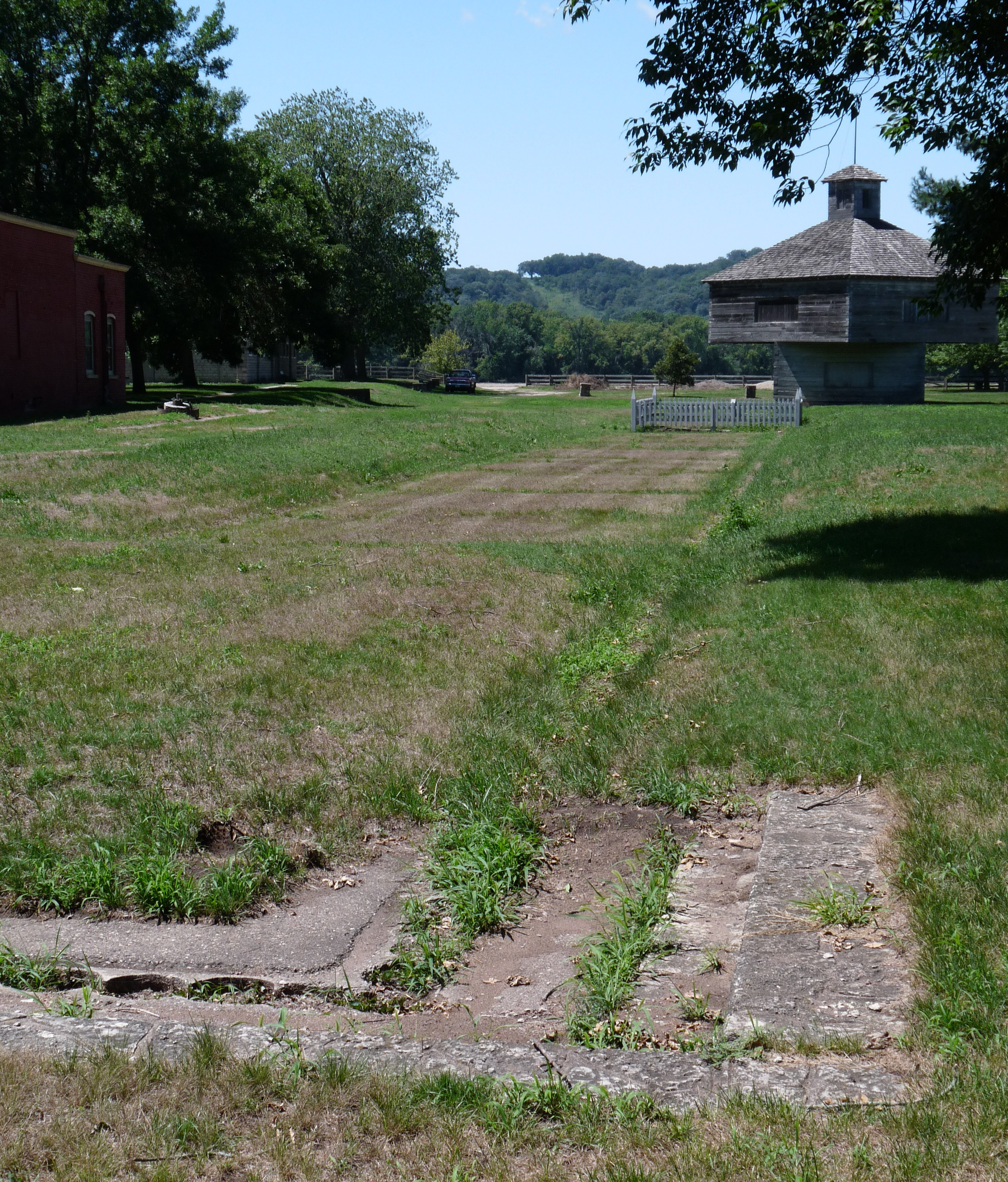
Footings of the first fort can be seen just north of the Villa Louis. The blockhouse in upper right is a reconstruction.

To protect Prairie du Chien against future invasion, U.S. forces returned in June 1816, with orders to construct a new fort on the site of Fort McKay. This fort was named Fort Crawford in honor of William H. Crawford, the Secretary of War under James Madison. Built entirely of wood except for the magazine, the fort measured 343 ft on each side and included Blockhouses at its northwest and southeast corners. Construction of the fort lasted through the summer of 1816.

Following the completion of Fort Crawford, the garrison was engaged primarily in peacekeeping between the new white settlers arriving in the region and the region's historic Native American tribes. Lieutenant Colonel Henry Leavenworth, a former U.S. Indian Agent, was among the early commanders at the fort. The United States conducted several negotiations with American Indians at Fort Crawford during the 1820s. One of the largest Indian councils in U.S. history was held at the fort in 1825, when over 5000 representatives of nearly a dozen Native American nations gathered to discuss and sign the first Treaty of Prairie du Chien.

Because of the first Fort Crawford's location alongside the Mississippi River, diseases such as malaria and dysentery were common among the troops. They did not understand the role of mosquitoes and sanitation in these diseases. In addition, the fort's wooden walls rotted because of seasonal flooding that took place nearly every spring. The post took meteorological observations in 1822. In 1826, after a major flood, the garrison at Fort Crawford was ordered to leave Prairie du Chien and reinforce Fort Snelling in Minnesota.

During 1827, while no troops remained in Prairie du Chien, a group of hostile Winnebago Indians led by chief Red Bird murdered a family of settlers near the abandoned fort. This incident was the start of the Winnebago War of 1827. The federal government ordered the return of soldiers to Prairie du Chien. Shortly afterward, the Army decided that the first Fort Crawford was no longer habitable. In 1828 a decision was made to build a new fort on higher ground. Maj. Stephen W. Kearny, commanding officer at the time, surveyed the area and chose a site for the new fort upon a hill near the Mississippi River's eastern bank.

== Second Fort Crawford ==
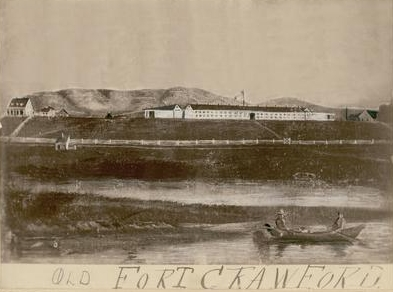
A painting of the Second Fort Crawford, circa 1840

The construction of the second Fort Crawford began in 1829 under the direction of the new commander, Col. Zachary Taylor, later elected as President of the United States. The new fort's location on the mainland in Prairie du Chien was much more floodproof. In addition, to make the fort more weather-proof, it was decided to construct the structure using quarried limestone rather than wood. Use of this material and delays in federal funding resulted in delays to complete the new fort; it was not finished until 1835. Troops in Prairie du Chien were unable to fully occupy the new fort's barracks until 1832, and in the meantime remained at the first Fort Crawford.

Army surgeon Dr. William Beaumont did his best to keep the troops healthy. Beaumont would later achieve fame for a series of experiments on human digestion which he conducted at locations across the United States. Fifty-six of these experiments were conducted at Fort Crawford hospital, and allowed Beaumont to draw conclusions on the effects of temperature and emotion on the digestive process.

As the second fort's barracks were being completed in 1832, the Black Hawk War broke out in Illinois, and the troops at Fort Crawford were called to defend pioneer settlements. After the Battle of Bad Axe near present-day Victory, Wisconsin, Chief Black Hawk surrendered to Col. Zachary Taylor at Fort Crawford. Black Hawk was imprisoned at the fort until he was escorted by Lt. Jefferson Davis to St. Louis, Missouri. Davis, who had been assigned to Fort Crawford in 1831, was later elected as President of the Confederate States of America during the American Civil War.

While assigned to Fort Crawford, Davis met and fell in love with Sarah Knox Taylor, the daughter of his commanding office Zachary Taylor. Colonel Taylor disapproved of the relationship between Davis and his daughter, as he felt the life of an Army officer was too hard on wives and families. In 1834 Davis was reassigned to Fort Gibson in Oklahoma. Shortly afterward, Davis resigned his commission in order to pursue his relationship with Sarah in Prairie du Chien. Upon discovering that Zachary Taylor still would not consent to their marriage, the couple eloped to Kentucky, where Davis married Sarah Taylor in 1835.

The surviving portion of the Second Fort Crawford in March 1864

In 1835-1836 the garrison at Fort Crawford was assigned to build a road between Fort Crawford and Fort Winnebago in Portage. The route they chose for the road is now followed by U.S. Highway 18 eastward from Prairie du Chien towards Madison, Wisconsin over Military Ridge, which is so named because of the military road which followed its crest. After the road was completed and the Ho-Chunk people were relocated from Wisconsin to Minnesota, the fort had little use. It was abandoned in 1849. In 1855 Fort Crawford was reoccupied when rumors circulated of an impending uprising among the remaining Native Americans, but no such event occurred. Troops left the fort for the last time on June 9, 1856.

During the American Civil War, the fort housed part of the Swift United States Army General Hospital.

=== Slavery at Fort Crawford ===
Slavery was a violation of both the Northwest Ordinance of 1787 and the Missouri Compromise of 1820. However, army officers sometimes brought enslaved individuals with them to forts in Northern territory. At least 17 African American enslaved individuals were brought to Fort Crawford by Army officers, one of whom was whipped to death at the fort by her owner.

In at least two instances, enslaved people were taken from Fort Snelling to Fort Crawford with their owners. In the early 1830s a woman named Rachel was enslaved to Lieutenant Thomas Stockton. She was enslaved by him from 1830 to 1831 at Fort Snelling, and they moved to Fort Crawford until 1834. After Rachel was sold with her son in St. Louis, she sued, claiming she had been illegally enslaved in the Minnesota Territory. She won her case in front of the Missouri Supreme Court in 1836. In 1836, James Thompson, who was enslaved by military officer William Day, was brought to Fort Crawford. There, he met missionary Alfred Brunson who raised money to purchase his freedom, in order to employ Thompson as an interpreter with the Dakota.

== Fort Crawford Museum ==
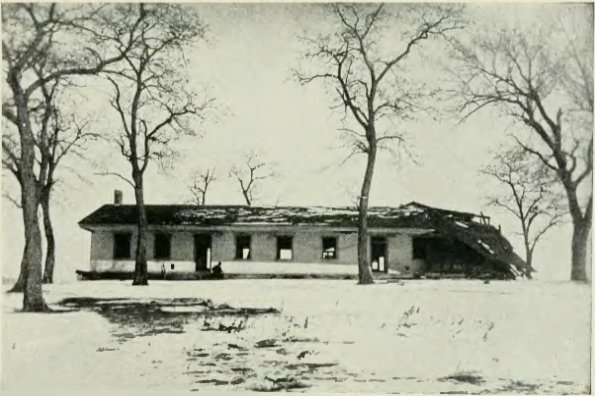
Ruins of the Fort Crawford hospital, 1903. This building was reconstructed and is now used as a museum.

Except during the American Civil War, when the fort was used as both a recruitment center and hospital for Union soldiers, Fort Crawford was left unoccupied between 1856 and 1933. In 1933, the Daughters of the American Revolution began work on reconstructing a portion of the fort's hospital, while clearing away the remaining parts of the dilapidated fort to allow for other development.

In the 1960s, the reconstructed fort hospital was transformed into a museum of medical history called the Fort Crawford Museum of Medical Progress. The museum featured exhibits on the experiments by Dr. Beaumont and other medical innovations. It was operated by the Wisconsin Medical Society until 1995. In 1996, the museum was donated to the Prairie du Chien Historical Society. It was converted into a museum of local history, called the Prairie du Chien Museum at Fort Crawford. While the fort's hospital, which is registered as a National Historic Landmark, still houses exhibits related to Dr. Beaumont and medical history, adjacent buildings are now filled with exhibits on other aspects of Prairie du Chien history.

== See also ==
- List of National Historic Landmarks in Wisconsin
- List of the oldest buildings in Wisconsin
- National Register of Historic Places listings in Crawford County, Wisconsin
