= Croixsyde =

Historic house in Minnesota, United States

- Benjamin B. Sheffield House
- U.S. National Register of Historic Places
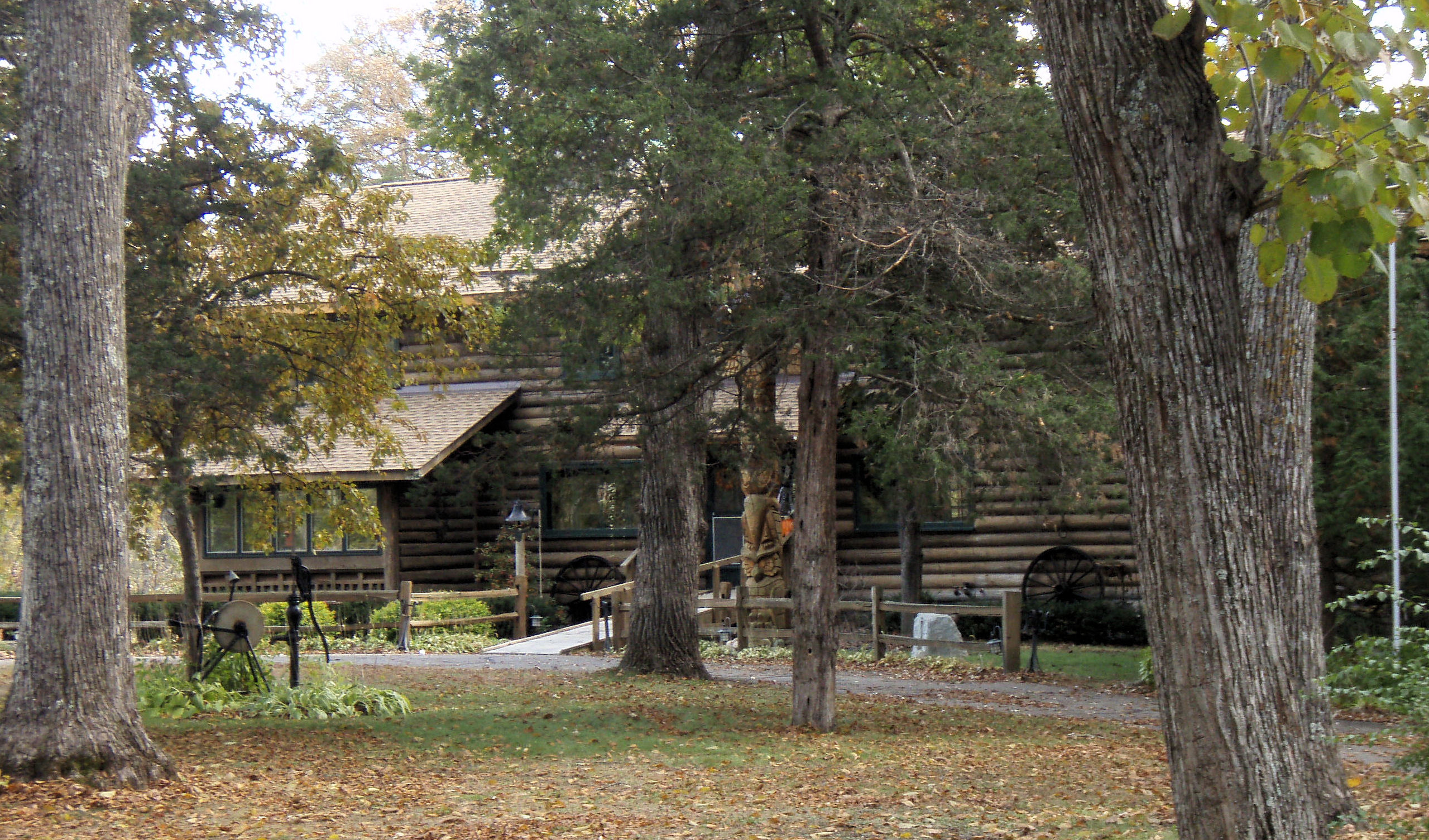
- Croixsyde viewed from the north

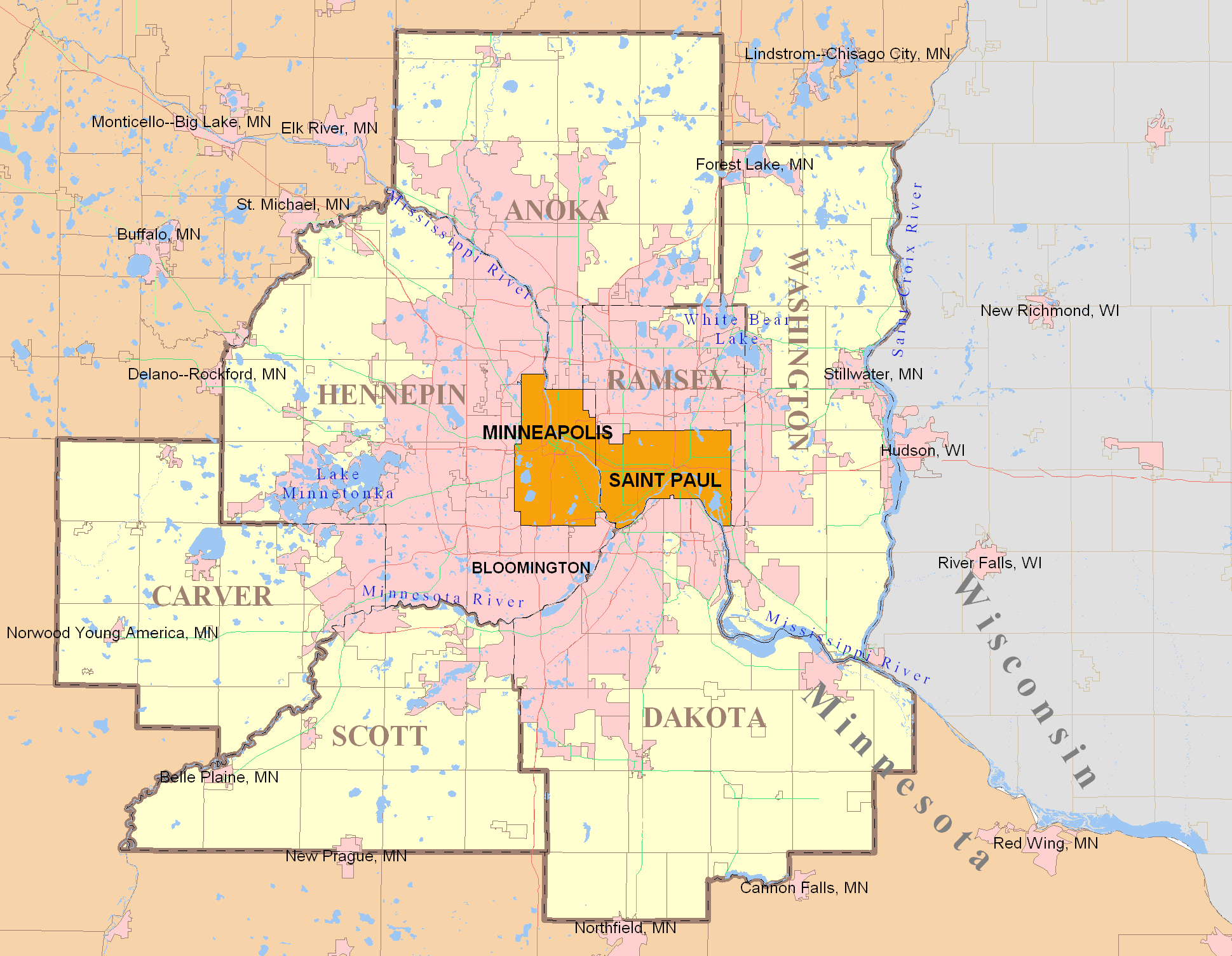
- Location within Minneapolis–Saint Paul Location within Minnesota Location within the United States
- Location: 4 Croixside Road, May Township, Minnesota
- Nearest city: Stillwater, Minnesota
- Coordinates: 45°9′17.5″N 92°45′31.5″W
- Area: Less than one acre
- Built: 1922–1927
- Architect: Chilson D. Alrich
- Architectural style: Rustic
- MPS: Washington County MRA (AD)
- NRHP reference No.: 80002177
- Designated: June 3, 1980

Croixsyde is a historic house in May Township, Minnesota, United States, near the city of Stillwater. It was built from 1922 to 1927 as one of the first summer homes on the St. Croix River. It was listed on the National Register of Historic Places as the Benjamin B. Sheffield House in 1980 for its local significance in the themes of architecture and entertainment/recreation. It was nominated for being an early example of the area's summer homes and for its fine rustic architecture.

== See also ==
- National Register of Historic Places listings in Washington County, Minnesota
