= Ellen Torelle Nagler =

American biologist, author, lecturer (1870–1965)

- Born: Ellen Torelle; June 11, 1870; Marine on St. Croix, Minnesota, U.S.
- Died: August 14, 1965 (aged 95); Prairie du Sac, Wisconsin, U.S.
- Education: University of Minnesota
- Occupations: biologist; author; lecturer
- Spouse: Louis B. Nagler (m. 1912; died 1946)
- Children: 1 son
- Awards: Eistedfod Prize

Ellen Torelle Nagler (née , Torelle; June 11, 1870 – August 14, 1965) was an American biologist, author, and lecturer. She originated a method of teaching science whereby her presentation of the subject followed a definite order of procedure; each object was studied first as an individual entity, and then as a part of the entire living universe.

She was editor of the biological and chemical articles in the Standard Reference Work, an encyclopedia for young people, and of the zoological articles for the New Student Reference Work (1919). Her Plant and Animal Children-How They Grow was published in 1912 and had further editions. Nagler was a recipient of the Eistedfod Prize.

== Early life and education ==
Ellen Torelle was born in Marine Mills, Minnesota, in 1870. She was the daughter of M. Nelson and Augusta Marie (von Mehlen) Torelle.

At Marine Mills, she finished the eighth grade before studying at River Falls Normal School, being at the head of her class in each school. Nagler graduated from the University of Minnesota (Ph.B. 1901, M.A. 1902), and also received a Ph.D. degree here.

== Career and research ==
Nagler began teaching at the age of fifteen in a country school. In 1901, she was the founder of the University Liberal Association at University of Minnesota, the first organization of its kind in any university in the United States, before which questions of philosophy, science, ethics and religion were discussed.

She spent the summer of 1902 at the Minnesota Seaside Station on Vancouver Island. She undertook research into the fauna and flora of the seashore of the Pacific Ocean. The two following years, she spent at Bryn Mawr College, successively as a scholar (1902–03) and fellow (1903–04) in biology. One summer, she did research at Woods Hole Biological Laboratories. Further research was carried on at the Zoological Station, Naples, Italy, in 1909, as scholar of the American Women's Table association. During her year or two abroad, she made a study of educational institutions on the continent of Europe, and in England, with special reference to methods of teaching, an experience which formed a valuable background for her later lecture courses. For a year, she was a lecturer for the children's department of the Municipal Museum, Milwaukee, on the subject of general elementary ethnology. Nagler was a member of Phi Beta Kappa and Sigma Xi.

The majority of economic, industrial, political and social evils are due to moral causes, and a perception of the individual's duty to society and society's duty to the individual would eradicate these evils. It is the high function of education to develop this perception.

— Ellen Torelle Nagler

In her early career, she was a teacher in the graded schools of Minneapolis for five years. She then served as principal of a graded school in Rathdrum, Idaho for two years. Nagler was a teacher of biology at Hackley High and Manual Training School in Muskegon, Michigan for one year; and worked as an instructor in botany, zoology, and physiology in other high schools of Michigan. A telling report of her work in this connection was published in the bulletin of the American Academy of Medicine. While teaching, she hosted occasional lecturers from women's clubs and teachers' associations, including the Wisconsin Academy of Science and the Wisconsin State Teachers' Association. The lecturers discussed such methods of teaching biology that the subjects of reproduction, as well as of growth, were developed, together with reasons for a social rather than an individualistic attitude toward life and living. She dedicated increasing attention to this phase of her career, finding in it the more universal medium of personal contact, and the Morse significant way of "putting across" her individual ideas. During the three following years, she was lecturer for the extension division of the University of Wisconsin on the subject of "Moral Education Based on Scientific Principles".

Nagler served as dean and professor of biology at Milwaukee-Downer College. A lecture tour during the year 1910 included the Academy of Medicine, New York City; the College of Physicians and Surgeons, Philadelphia; and the Medical-Chirurgical Society, Baltimore (Transactions of American Society of Sanitary and Moral Prophylaxis); the general subject was, "Botany and Zoology as a Means of Teaching Sex-Hygiene".

She was editor of the biological and chemical articles in the Standard Reference Work, an encyclopedia for young people, and of the zoological articles for the New Student Reference Work (1919).

Under her maiden name, "Ellen Torelle", a book published in 1912, which had further editions, called Plant and Animal Children-How They Grow attracted the attention of educators throughout the country in its successful method of presenting the principles of sex-hygiene to children through natural and unartificial channels. She was also the author of "Report of Work Done in Biology with Children of the Eighth Grade Elementary and First Year High School" (Bulletin of the American Academy of Medicine), 1906. She published several papers embodying results of research in the American Journal of Physiology, 1903; Roux's Archiv für Entwickelungsmechanik, 1904; Bulletin Wisconsin Natural History Society, 1907; Zoologischen Anzeiger, 1909.

== Personal life ==
In June 1912, she married Louis B. Nagler (1871–1946). (Note: The wedding date is uncertain as, according to The Capital Times (Madison, Wisconsin): "Mr. and Mrs. Nagler moved to Madison in 1905.") He served as Assistant Secretary of State of Wisconsin, under Fred R. Zimmerman. They had one child, a son, Robert T. La Follette Nagler (1914–1999). In 1942, the Naglers removed to Prairie du Sac, Wisconsin. Louis died in this town in 1946.

In religion, Nagler was a Unitarian. She served as director of philanthropic work carried on by First Unitarian Church of Minneapolis, 1900–1902. She had been a member of the Wisconsin Academy of Science, the Wisconsin Natural History Society, the American Association for Advancement of Science, City Club, Down Town Club (Milwaukee), and the Association Collegiate Alumnae. Nagler favored woman suffrage. A follower of Robert M. La Follette, she took an active part in the Progressive movement.

Nadler was deaf for many years. She died in the hospital in Prairie du Sac, on August 14, 1965.

== Awards and honors ==
- Eistedfod Prize, for excellence in teaching children's singing

== Selected works ==
- Plant and Animal Children-How They Grow (1912)
