= Marjorie Edgar =

American folklorist

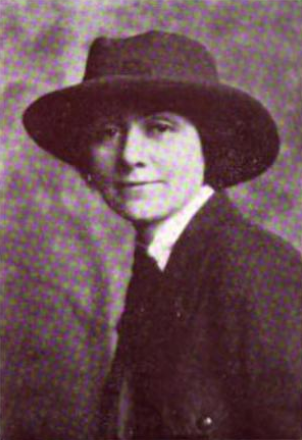
- Marjorie Edgar, from a 1924 publication
- Born: February 17, 1889; Minneapolis, Minnesota, U.S.
- Died: April 20, 1960 (age 71); Stillwater, Minnesota, U.S.
- Occupations: Girl Scout leader, folklorist

Marjorie Edgar (February 17, 1889 – April 20, 1960) was an American Girl Scout leader and folklorist, based in Minnesota. She made a significant collection of Finnish folk songs among the immigrant families of rural Minnesota.

== Early life and education ==
Edgar was born in Minneapolis, Minnesota, the daughter of William Crowell Edgar and Anne Page Robinson Edgar. Her businessman father published a literary weekly, The Bellman, and a trade journal, The Northwestern Miller. She attended Rosemary Hall in Connecticut, and studied folk music with Grace Hodsdon Boutelle, a student of Cecil Sharp's.

As a young woman, she was a friend to Helen Taft and her future sister-in-law Martha Bowers, during their visit to Minneapolis in 1912. Edgar was a bridesmaid when Bowers married Robert A. Taft in 1914.

== Career ==
Edgar helped organize the first Girl Scout troop in Minnesota in 1915, and one of the first Girl Scout camps. She was regional director of the Girl Scout councils and troops in Minnesota. She also trained Girl Scout leaders in a program at Carleton College in 1923.

During the 1930s, Edgar worked as a writer, researcher, and transcriber for the Minnesota Writers' Project. She served on the board of directors of the Minnesota chapter of the National League of American Pen Women. She presented on her work to women's groups, scout gatherings, and other audiences, sometimes in costume. In the 1940s she was on the music committee of the Folk Arts Foundation of Minnesota.

== Publications ==
In addition to two song books for Girl Scout use, Edgar published research in journals including Journal of American Folklore, Minnesota History, and Western Folklore.

- Songs of Camp Minnesota for Girl Scout Leaders (1925)
- Old Songs and Balladry for Girl Scouts (1930)
- "Finnish Charms from Minnesota" (1934)
- "Finnish Folk Songs in Minnesota" (1935)
- "Finnish Charms and Folk Songs in Minnesota" (1936)
- "Imaginary Animals of Northern Minnesota" (1940)
- "Finnish Proverbs in Minnesota" (1943)
- "Ballads of the Knife-Men" (1949)

== Personal life ==
Edgar lived in Marine on St. Croix, with her mother from 1931 to 1949. She died in 1960, at the age of 71, in Stillwater, Minnesota. The Minnesota Historical Society holds the papers of Edgar and her family.
