= David B. Loomis =

American politician

Member of the Minnesota Territorial Council
- In office September 3, 1849 – January 3, 1854
- Preceded by: Position established
- Succeeded by: John Edward Mower

Member of the Minnesota House of Representatives for the 22nd district
- In office January 6, 1874 – January 4, 1875

Personal details
- Born: 1817 Connecticut
- Died: 1897 (aged 79–80)
- Party: Whig
- Occupation: Lumberman

Military service
- Allegiance: United States
- Branch/service: Union Army
- Years of service: 1861–1864
- Rank: Captain
- Unit: 2nd Minnesota Infantry Regiment
- Battles/wars: American Civil War

David B. Loomis (1817–1897) was an American lumberman and politician who served in the Minnesota Territorial Council from 1849 until 1854 and in the Minnesota House of Representatives for the year 1874. He was the President of the Territorial Council from 1851 until 1852.

== Biography ==
Loomis was born in Connecticut in 1817. He came to Alton, Illinois, with his parents and received his common education there. He then attended Western Reserve University. His brother, Elias, was a professor of mathematics while he attended.

Loomis came to St. Croix Falls in 1843 and began working in the lumber industry. He would partner with such figures as W.H.C. Folsom and Martin Mower, the brother of John Edward Mower.

Upon the establishment of the Minnesota Territory, Loomis was elected to the Territorial Council. His place of residence was listed as Marine Mills. He was appointed President of the Council for the Second Territorial Legislature. While President, he created legislation that formed Chisago County.

Upon the outbreak of the Civil War, Loomis was enlisted into the 2nd Minnesota Infantry Regiment. He was made first lieutenant of Company F and was sent to Fort Ripley. He was made captain in 1863 but had to resign due to disability a year later.

Following the war, he moved to Stillwater and was elected to the House of Representatives for one term. He died in 1897.
