= Maple Island, Washington County, Minnesota =

Maple Island
- Unincorporated community
- Location within Minnesota Location within the United States
- Coordinates: 45°10′27″N 92°51′19″W
- Country: United States
- State: Minnesota
- County: Washington County
- Township: May Township
- Elevation: 958 ft (292 m)
- Time zone: UTC-6 (Central (CST))
  - Summer (DST): UTC-5 (CDT)
- ZIP code: 55047
- Area code: 651
- GNIS feature ID: 654817

Maple Island is an unincorporated community in May Township, Washington County, Minnesota, United States. The community is located west-southwest of Marine on St. Croix near the junction of May Avenue and 155th Street North.

Nearby places include Marine on St. Croix, Scandia, Hugo, and Stillwater.
