= Arcola Mills =

- John and Martin Mower House and Arcola Mill Site
- U.S. National Register of Historic Places
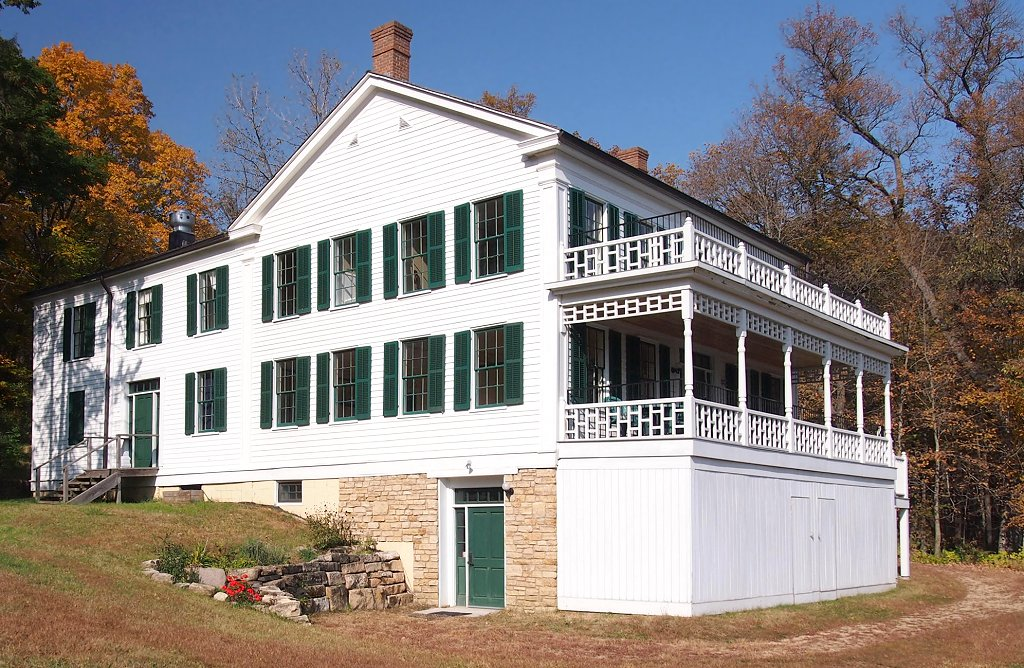
- The Mower House from the southeast

- Location within Minnesota Location within the United States
- Location: 12905 Arcola Trail N., Arcola, Minnesota
- Coordinates: 45°8′17.2″N 92°45′6″W
- Area: 2 acres (0.81 ha)
- Built: 1847
- Architectural style: Greek Revival
- MPS: Washington County MRA (AD)
- NRHP reference No.: 80000407
- Designated NRHP: June 17, 1980

Arcola Mills is a historic house in the unincorporated community of Arcola, Minnesota, United States. Built in 1847, it is considered the third-oldest and largest all-wood-frame house still standing in Minnesota. It was the home of brothers Martin and John Mower, who established one of the first sawmills on the St. Croix River and the community around it. The house and the remnants of the nearby mill were listed on the National Register of Historic Places in 1980 as the John and Martin Mower House and Arcola Mill Site for having local significance in the themes of architecture, exploration/settlement, and industry. The property was nominated as an "excellent example" of Greek Revival architecture and for its association with the region's early settlement and lumber industry. The property now operates as a non-profit event and education center.

== Description ==
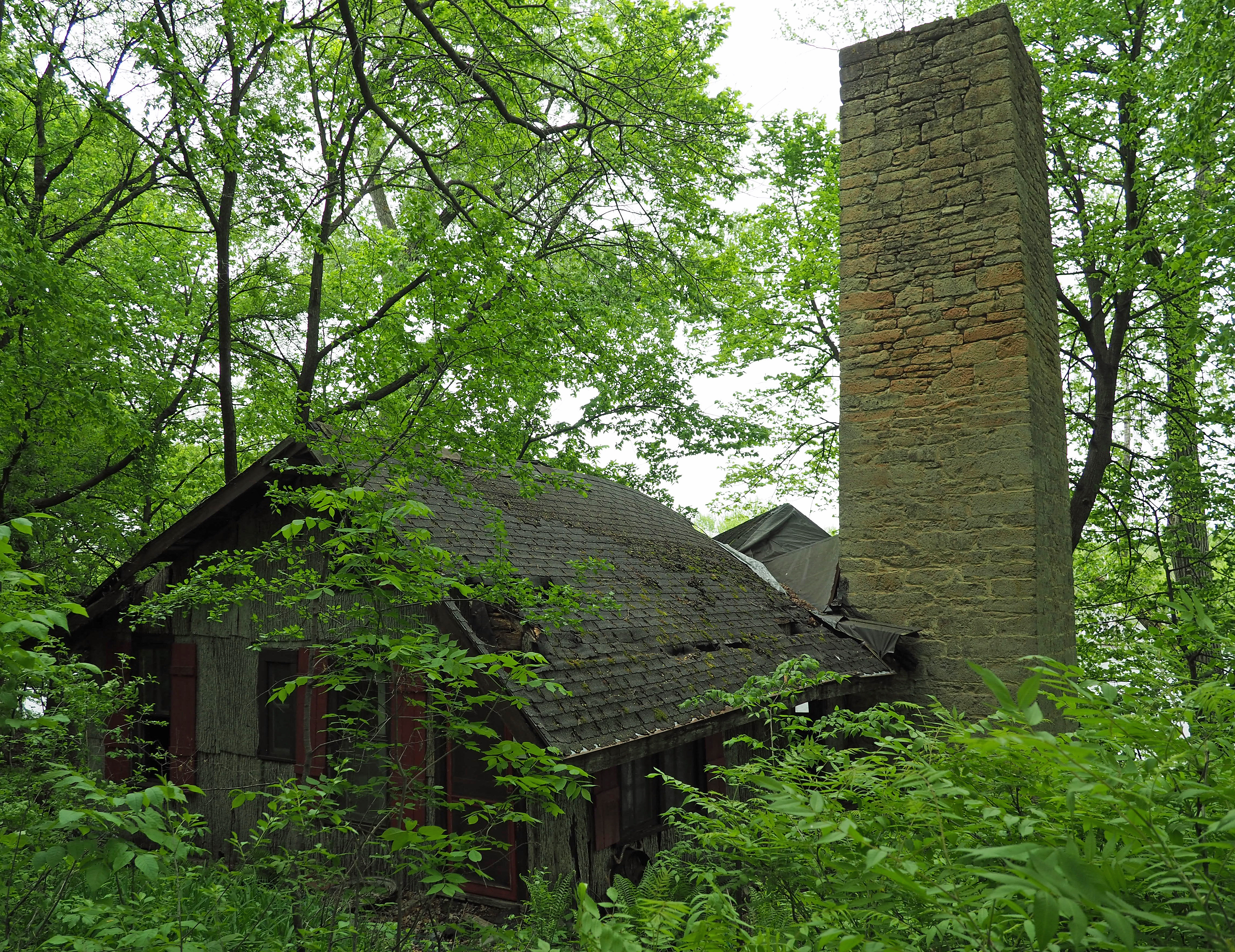
The mill's chimney abutted by a derelict 20th-century summer cottage

Arcola Mills is located seven miles (11 km) north of Stillwater, Minnesota. The house is a two-story wood-frame structure with clapboard siding. It originally had a simple rectangular footprint of 36 by 50 feet (11 by 15 m). The Mowers added additions to the west and south in the 1870s, but these have since been removed.

The east façade of the house, which faces the river, has a full-width porch topped by a deck accessed from the upper floor. Greek Revival elements include corner pilasters and broken pediments at the gable ends.

The sawmill was a few hundred feet north of the house. Still standing is a 40-foot (12 m) stone chimney.

== Establishment ==
John Mower, originally from Maine, moved to St. Croix Falls, Wisconsin, in 1842 to work in the lumber industry. His brother Martin settled in Stillwater the following year and John soon joined him on the Minnesota side of the river. With three business partners, Martin established the sawmill north of town in 1847. Two of his partners immediately cashed out while John bought into the enterprise. The brothers built their home adjacent to the mill and established the town of Arcola around it for their employees. Town structures included a general store, a one-room schoolhouse, a boarding house, and shops for carpentry, blacksmithing, and boatbuilding.

John Mower served in the 1854 Minnesota Territorial Legislature and Mower County was named in his honor. Martin Mower worked as the managing owner of the St. Croix Boom Company. John had a wife and children but Martin remained a lifelong bachelor.

The original sawmill was powered by a 34-foot-diameter (10 m) water wheel in an enclosed wheelhouse over a spring-fed stream. In 1856 the Mowers rebuilt the mill and converted to steam power, doubling their annual output. Three years later they installed a new steam engine and other equipment, more than doubling their annual output again. By the 1870s, however, the brothers were engrossed in other endeavors and closed the mill.

== Later history ==
The house remained in the Mower family, but by the mid-1930s it was vacant when newlyweds Henry and Katharine Van Meier chanced upon it while collecting ferns. They fell in love with the old structure and arranged to purchase it for a summer home. Over the years they assembled a collection of small cottages on the 50-acre (20 ha) property for use by friends, family, and artists.

Katharine Van Meier died in the early 1990s, establishing in her will the Arcola Mills Historic Foundation to preserve the property. Volunteers raised funds and had the house largely restored over the first decade of the 21st century. Arcola Mills now serves primarily as an event venue. From 2010 to 2013 the house also hosted a volunteer-run visitor center for the St. Croix National Scenic Riverway, but this partnership with the National Park Service proved economically unfeasible for the Arcola Mills foundation because it could not provide any rental income.

== See also ==
- National Register of Historic Places listings in Washington County, Minnesota
