= Arcola, Minnesota =

Arcola
- Unincorporated community
- Location within Minnesota Location within the United States
- Coordinates: 45°07′24″N 92°46′00″W
- Country: United States
- State: Minnesota
- County: Washington County
- Township: May Township
- Elevation: 873 ft (266 m)
- Time zone: UTC-6 (Central (CST))
  - Summer (DST): UTC-5 (CDT)
- ZIP code: 55082
- Area code: 651
- GNIS feature ID: 654572

Arcola is an unincorporated community in May Township, Washington County, Minnesota, United States. Arcola is located in the southeast part of May Township along State Highway 95 (MN 95). The northeast part of Stillwater Township is also in the immediate area. Nearby places include Stillwater and Marine on St. Croix.

Arcola was first settled circa 1847. The John and Martin Mower House and Arcola Mill Site, around which the community was founded, is listed on the National Register of Historic Places.

Historical population
Census	Pop.	Note	%±
1880	24		—
U.S. Decennial Census
