= James Thompson (interpreter) =

African American settler (1799–1884)

- Born: 1799; Virginia
- Died: October 15, 1884 (aged 84–85); Santee Sioux Reservation

James Thompson (1799–1884) was the first African-American settler in St. Paul, Minnesota and an English-Dakota interpreter for Methodist missionary Alfred Brunson. He was born enslaved but achieved his freedom in 1837.

== Biography ==
Thompson was born enslaved in Virginia around 1799. He was enslaved by George Monroe, the nephew of President James Monroe. At some point prior to 1827, Monroe used Thompson to pay off his gambling debt to John Culbertson.

Culbertson took Thompson to Minnesota in 1827. Culbertson was a sutler, or a civilian merchant who sold provisions to the First Infantry which was stationed at Fort Snelling. While staying at Fort Snelling, Culbertson sold Thompson to military officer William Day.

In 1833, Thompson, still enslaved by Day, married a Dakota woman, who was the daughter of Dakota leader Mahpiya Wicasta (Cloud Man). He began the learn the Dakota language.

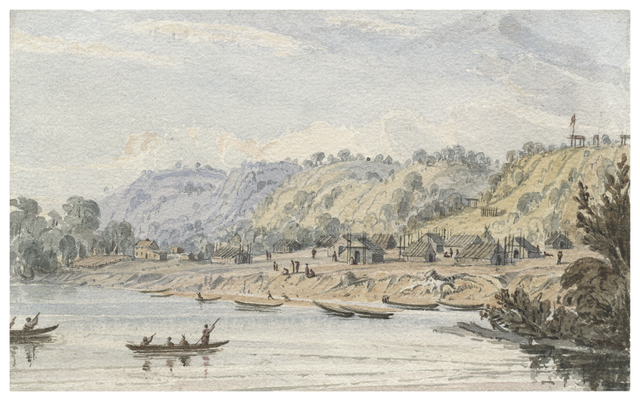
Kaposia, where Thompson and Brunson set up a Methodist mission.

In 1836, Day was reassigned to Fort Crawford in Prairie du Chien and took Thompson with him, separating Thompson from his wife. Soon after, the missionary Alfred Brunson was looking for someone who spoke Dakota and shared his Methodist values to serve as his interpreter. He chose Thompson, due to his relationship to the Dakota through his wife and because he was a committed Methodist. Thompson also likely served as a diplomatic symbol that bound the mission and the Dakota together, again because of his Dakota wife.

Brunson purchased Thompson's freedom for $1,200 with financial help from friends out East. By May 19, 1837, Thompson was free. He returned to Fort Snelling with Brunson and reunited with his wife. The small group began the areas first Methodist mission in the Dakota village of Kaposia, with land gifted to them by the Dakota leader Wakinyatanka "Big Thunder" (Little Crow III). At one point, Thompson helped the missionary party travel up the Mississippi, serving as navigator and hunting for food. However, Wakinyatanka revoked his acceptance of the mission 1839, no longer allowing his children to take part, and attendance waned. The sponsors of the mission complained that it was too expensive. Brunson soon left the church.

Thompson left Kaposia and began selling liquor near Fort Snelling. He was forced to move, along with other whiskey sellers, in May 1840. The group settled in what would soon be known as Pig's Eye. Pig's Eye would become St. Paul.

Thompson then worked as a carpenter, helping to construct the house of Edward Phelan and John Hays, considered the first home to be built in St. Paul. He also built and operated the first ferry boat between modern day downtown and West St. Paul.

"He had played an important part in the history of our city and state, and during the fifty-seven years that he had trod our soil, I find nothing to mar a well-earned and excellent reputation."

— Thomas Newsom, Pen Pictures of St. Paul

By 1841, the Thompsons had two children: Sarah and George. Thompson would go on to have nine, of which only George outlived him. Thompson was the first African-American to settle in St. Paul. By many accounts, he and his wife were well-treated by other residents, especially due to Thompson's active role in the towns growth.

In 1849, Thompson helped to build a new church, donating land, money, and materials, including 1,500 shingles and 2,000 feet of lumber.

By 1862, Thompson and his family lived near the Lower Sioux Agency. He left his family for the safety of Fort Ridgely during the U.S.-Dakota War. After the war, Thompson was reunited with his family and returned to St. Paul.

Toward the end of his life, Thompson followed his son to Nebraska to live on the Santee Sioux Reservation. He died there on October 15, 1884.

== Legacy ==
In 1998, artist Melvin Smith created a 40-foot sculpture to honor James Thompson and other early Black St. Paul residents. The sculpture is called "The Spirit of Rondo" and is at the Western Sculpture Park near the Minnesota State Capitol. Smith found the location fitting as Black stonemasons from Georgia helped to build the Capitol.
