= Marine Mill =

- Marine Mill Site
- U.S. National Register of Historic Places
- U.S. Historic district – Contributing property
- Minnesota State Register of Historic Places
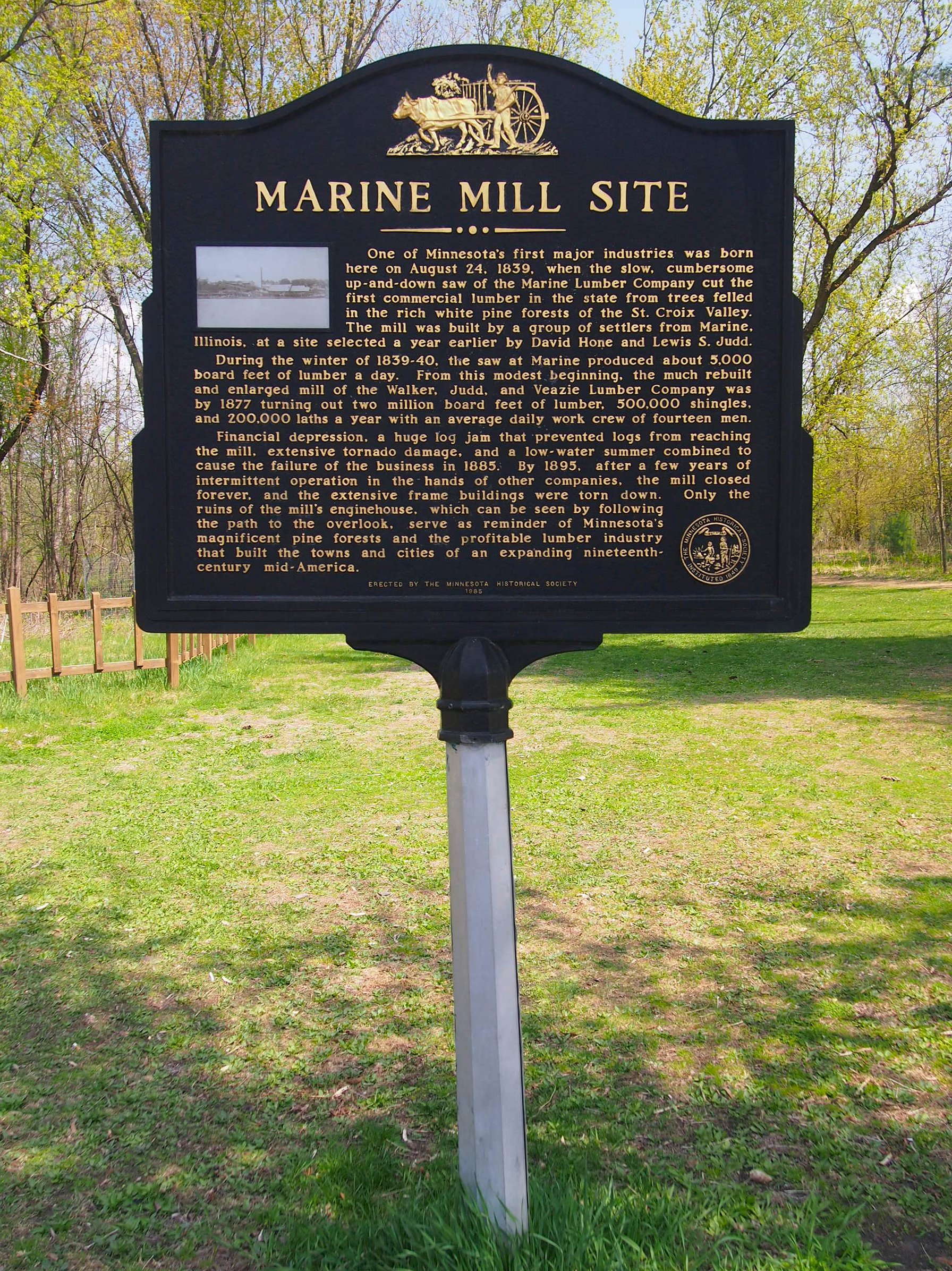
- The Marine Mill Site historical marker

- Location within Minnesota Location within the United States
- Location: Judd Street, Marine on St. Croix, Minnesota
- Coordinates: 45°11′53″N 92°46′6″W
- Area: 7 acres (2.8 ha)
- Built: 1839–1873
- Part of: Marine on St. Croix Historic District (ID74001043)
- MPS: Washington County MRA (AD)
- NRHP reference No.: 70000311

Significant dates
- Added to NRHP: January 26, 1970
- Designated CP: June 28, 1974

The Marine Mill, established in 1839, was the first commercial sawmill in what became the U.S. state of Minnesota. Now in ruins, it is currently a historic site managed by the city of Marine on St. Croix in partnership with the Minnesota Historical Society. It was listed on the National Register of Historic Places as the Marine Mill Site in 1970 for having state-level significance in the themes of exploration/settlement, industry, and transportation. It was nominated for being the birthplace of the region's seminal industry—lumbering—and a major landing on its crucial transportation route, the St. Croix River. The site is also a contributing property to the Marine on St. Croix Historic District.

== Operational history ==
Lewis Judd and David Hone identified the site, with a swift-flowing stream for power and a bank suitable for steamboats, as ideal for a sawmill during an 1838 scouting expedition. They were members of a group of New Englanders who had come west in search of new lumbering opportunities. They returned to their home base in Marine, Illinois, and chartered the Marine Lumber Company with six other business partners. In May 1839 the eight partners, plus one member's wife and two children, arrived by steamboat with a load of milling machinery. When the partners came upon squatters on the site, ready to contest claim to the site, the Illinois partners paid $300 to establish their title to the site. In just 90 days they had completed their sawmill, cutting lumber for the first time on August 24. The land, only purchased by the United States in 1837 through treaties with the Ojibwe and Dakota people, was not yet legally open to settlement.

The original mill cut less than 5,000 feet (1,500 m) of lumber per day, so it was replaced in 1852 with a larger mill powered by a 40-foot (12 m) water wheel. However the whole building burned down in a fire in September 1863, idling workers for three years until a replacement was constructed in 1866. To keep pace with its competitors, that mill was almost completely remodeled in 1873, at which point it could cut up to 30,000 feet (9,100 m) per day.

The mill, then known as the Walker, Judd, and Veazie Mill, was at its most profitable in the early 1870s. However a widespread economic depression triggered by the Panic of 1873, delays caused by a series of log jams on the river, and the valley's dwindling lumber supply soon changed that, and the mill went bankrupt in 1885. Various attempts to reopen the mill failed, and the business was dismantled in 1895. Over its 56 years of operation the mill had produced some 197,000,000 feet (60,000,000 m) of lumber.

== Later history ==
The Marine Mill site lay abandoned for nearly 70 years. It wasn't until 1964 that a resource commission recommended acquiring the land as a historic site. No action was taken until a local committee formed in 1970 to advocate for preservation, and the following year the Minnesota Legislature appropriated funds to buy the site. The local committee also cleared decades of revegetation, uncovering the foundations of support structures. The land acquisition was completed in 1972 and the property transferred to the Minnesota Historical Society.

== Description ==
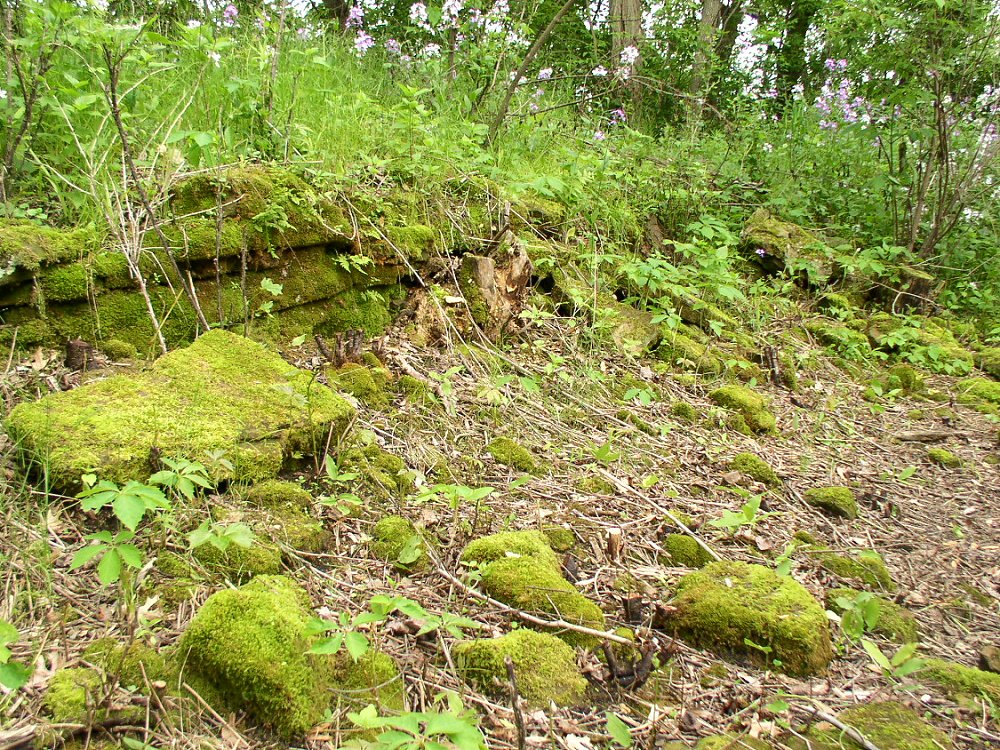
The scant foundation ruins of a mill complex building

At its peak the mill complex occupied about six acres (2.4 ha). In addition to the sawmill there was a planing mill, storage sheds, the steamboat levee, and piles of cut lumber, shingles, and laths. Between 1888 and 1895 all the wooden buildings were dismantled and the machinery sold off. All that remained were the stone walls of the 1873 sawmill and its water wheel. Today a historical marker stands by the entrance to the property, and an open lawn leads to an overlook of the sawmill ruins. A short interpretive trail leads past the faint foundations of two other mill complex buildings. The stream that powered the mill still runs through the site.

== See also ==
- List of watermills in the United States
- National Register of Historic Places listings in Washington County, Minnesota
