= Fowler, Ohio =

Unincorporated community in Ohio, U.S.

Coordinates: 41°18′40″N 80°39′20″W

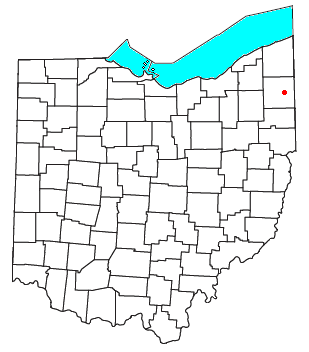
Location of Fowler, Ohio

Fowler is an unincorporated community in central Fowler Township, Trumbull County, Ohio, United States. It has a post office with the ZIP code 44418. It lies at the intersection of State Routes 193 and 305.

The community is part of the Youngstown–Warren–Boardman, OH-PA Metropolitan Statistical Area.

A post office called Fowler has been in operation since 1826. The community takes its name from Fowler Township.
