= John Edward Mower =

American politician

John Edward Mower (September 18, 1815 – June 11, 1879) was a member of the Minnesota Territorial Legislature in the 1850s. On March 1, 1856, the second territorial Governor Willis A. Gorman (D) honored him by giving the newly created Mower County his name.

== Biography ==
John was born in New Vineyard, Massachusetts (in an area that would later become Maine), in 1815. His family made the move west and settled in St. Louis, Missouri, where he met and married Gratia A. Remick. He and his brother, Martin, moved their families to the area around St. Croix Falls, Wisconsin, and established themselves in the lumber business in 1843. In 1845 John floated his family downriver on a raft made from the lumber that he would use to build the second frame building in Stillwater, Minnesota, their new home. The Mower brothers built a house in the style of Greek Revival in Arcola in 1847 and it is now on the National Register of Historic Places. He died on June 11, 1879, and is buried in Fairview Cemetery in Stillwater, Minnesota.

== Political career ==
John Edward Mower was elected to the fifth and sixth Minnesota Territorial Councils and in 1875 he was elected to the Minnesota House of Representatives.
