= William Dugas =

Member of the Minnesota Territorial House of Representatives
- In office September 3, 1849 – December 31, 1850

Personal details
- Born: 1809 Three Rivers, Lower Canada
- Died: Unknown Likely Dayton, Minnesota
- Party: Democratic
- Occupation: Millwright; Farmer

William Dugas (/duːɡɑː/, 1809–unknown) was a Canadian-American millwright, farmer, and politician who served in the Minnesota Territorial House of Representatives from 1849 to 1850. He was also responsible for the first sawmill in Saint Paul.

== Biography ==
Dugas was born in Three Rivers, Lower Canada, in 1809. He emigrated to the United States in 1831 and spent time traveling to locations such as New Orleans, Indian Territory, Iowa, and Illinois. He settled in Saint Paul in 1844. He was employed as a millwright and in 1845, he built the first sawmill in the city. It was powered by water and was situated on Phalen Creek. Eighteen months later, he sold the mill, moved to Little Canada, and engaged in farming.

Dugas was elected to the Territorial House in 1849 and served on the roads committee. He was described as being "somewhat illiterate, but made up for [his] deficiencies in [his] respect by [his] hard common sense and honesty of purpose."

Following his legislative stint, he engaged in the hotel business and ran a ferry in St. Anthony. Later he would move to Dayton and operated a farm there.
