= Ira B. Brunson =

American politician (1815–1883)

Ira Burr Brunson
- Born: November 5, 1815; Fowler, Ohio
- Died: August 21, 1883 (aged 67)
- Occupations: Pioneer, jurist, and territorial legislator
- Father: Alfred Brunson
- Relatives: Benjamin Wetherill Brunson (brother)

Ira Burr Brunson (November 5, 1815 – August 21, 1883) was an American pioneer, jurist, and territorial legislator.

Born in Fowler, Ohio, he settled in Prairie du Chien, Wisconsin Territory in 1836. He surveyed land in the area. He served in different offices including sheriff of Crawford County, Wisconsin and Clerk of the Crawford County Wisconsin Circuit Court. In 1854, he served as Crawford County Court Judge until his death and also served as postmaster of Prairie du Chien in 1840. From 1837 to 1840, he served in the Wisconsin Territorial House of Representatives of the Wisconsin Territorial Legislature as a Democrat. His father was Alfred Brunson, who also served in the Wisconsin Territorial Legislature. Brunson died in Prairie du Chien, Wisconsin. Upon his death, he was succeeded by Charles S. Fuller as county judge of Crawford County.
