= Maple Island (Lake Superior) =

Island in Algoma District, Ontario, Canada

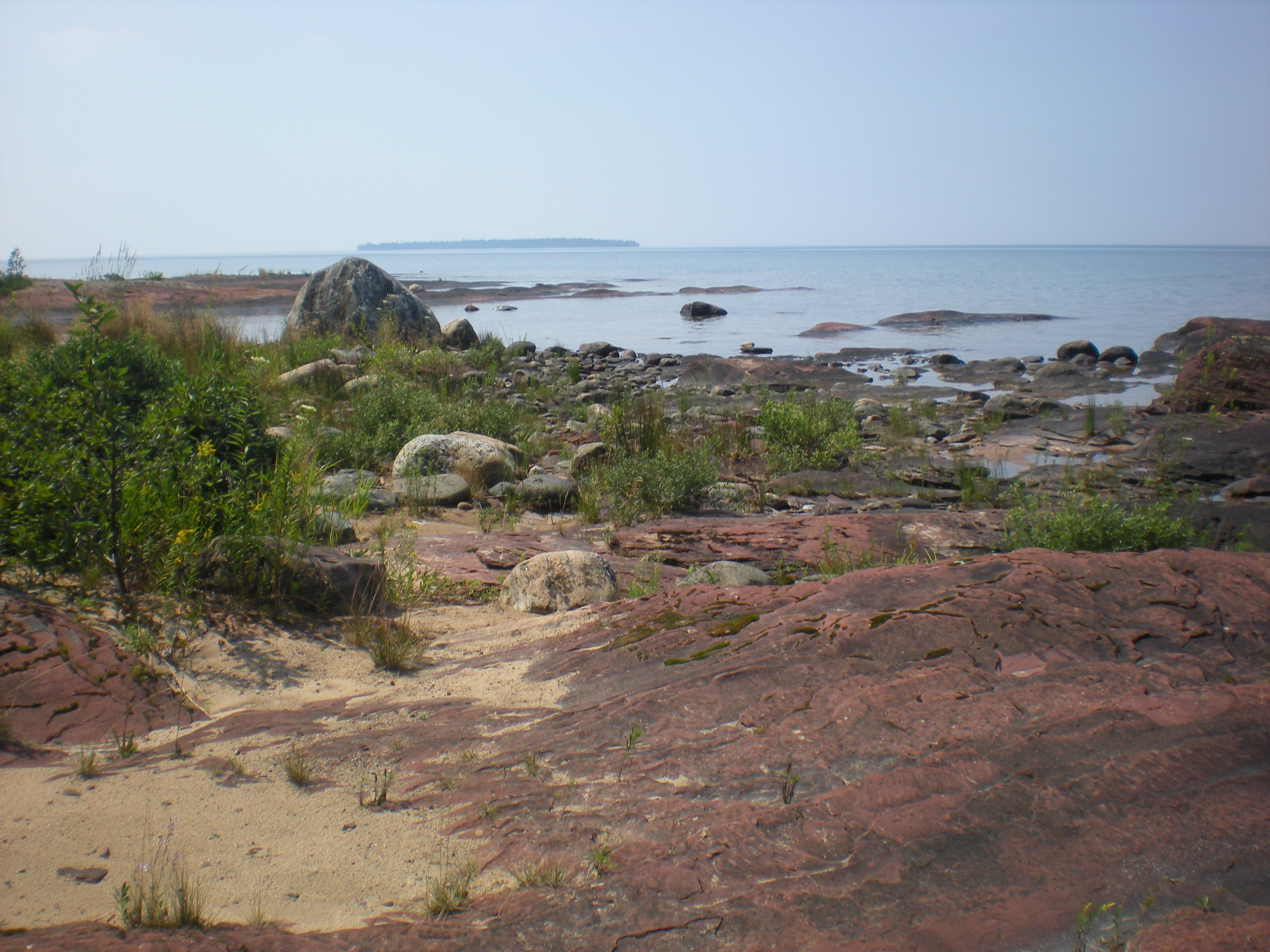
- Lake Superior. Maple Island, Eastern Whitefish Bay. August 2009.
- Interactive map of Maple Island

Geography
- Location: Whitefish Bay, Lake Superior
- Coordinates: 46.7691°N 84.5783°W

Administration
- Canada
- Province: Ontario

Maple Island is a small island in eastern Whitefish Bay of Lake Superior, located a few kilometres from Canada's shore between Goulais Bay and Batchawana Bay.
