= Benjamin Wetherill Brunson =

American surveyor and politician

Member of the Minnesota Territorial House of Representatives
- In office September 3, 1849 – January 6, 1852

Personal details
- Born: 1823 Detroit, Michigan
- Died: 1898 (aged 74–75)
- Party: Whig
- Relatives: Alfred Brunson (father); Ira B. Brunson (brother)
- Occupation: Surveyor

Military service
- Allegiance: United States
- Branch/service: Union Army
- Rank: Lieutenant
- Unit: 8th Minnesota Infantry Regiment
- Battles/wars: American Civil War

Benjamin Wetherill Brunson (Note: His last name has also been spelled as Bronson) (1823–1898) was an American surveyor and politician who served in the Minnesota Territorial House of Representatives from 1849 until 1852. He was one of the original platters of Saint Paul, Minnesota.

== Biography ==
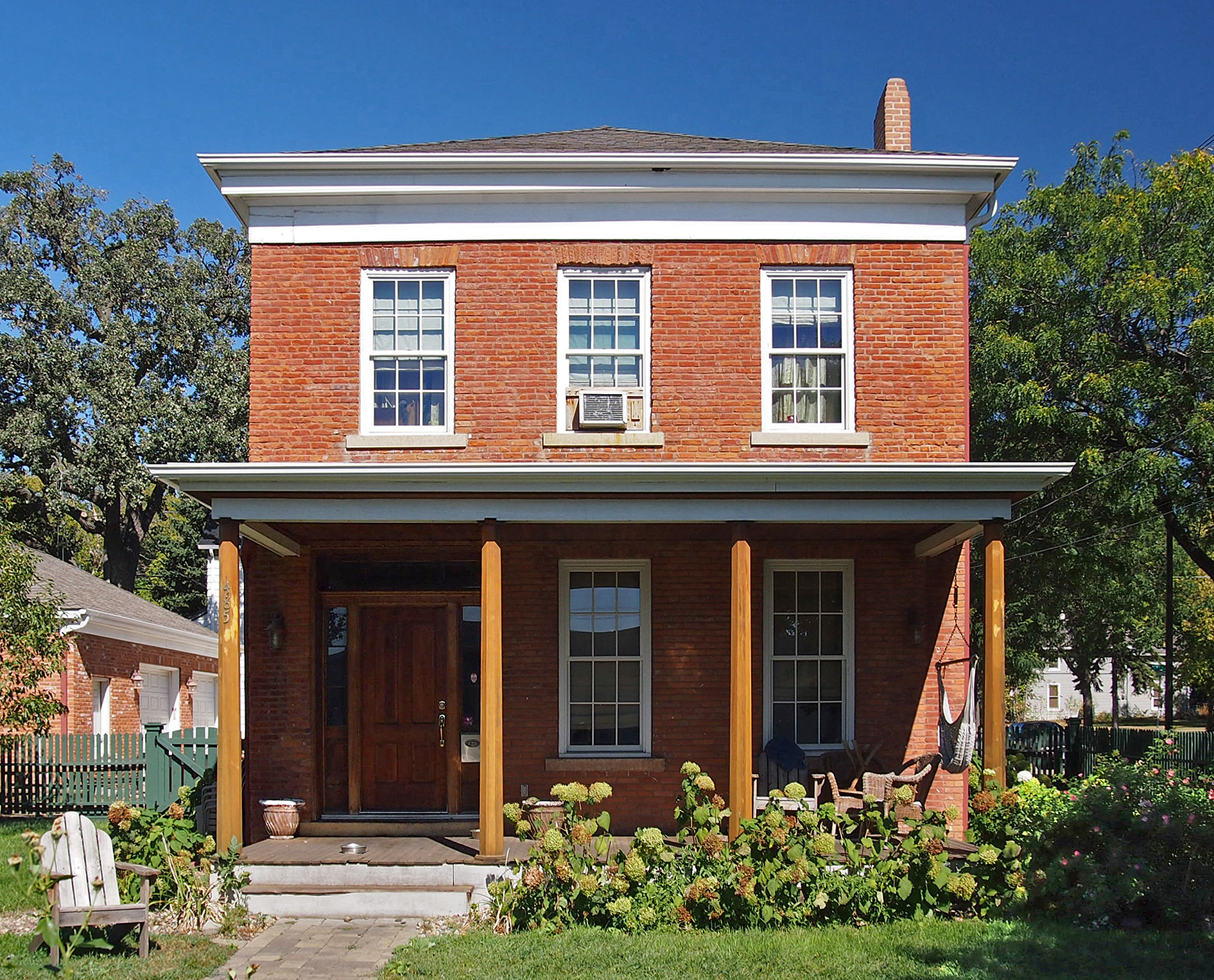
Brunson's house in Saint Paul

Brunson was born in 1823 in Detroit. His father, Alfred Brunson, was a prominent Methodist preacher. In 1835, the Brunsons moved to Prairie du Chien, then a part of Michigan Territory.

Brunson came to Saint Paul in 1847 and assisted his brother, Ira B. Brunson, in platting the city for the first time. He would then serve in the Minnesota Territorial House of Representatives for the first and second sessions.

In 1855, the Benjamin Brunson House was built. It was built in a federal style and was listed in the National Register of Historic Places in 1975. It is one of the oldest surviving houses in Saint Paul.

Brunson joined the 8th Minnesota Infantry Regiment for the Civil War. The regiment would eventually merge into William Tecumseh Sherman's army in North Carolina. He achieved the rank of lieutenant.

He died in Saint Paul in May 1898.
