= John W. North =

American abolitionist and politician (1815–1890)

John Wesley North
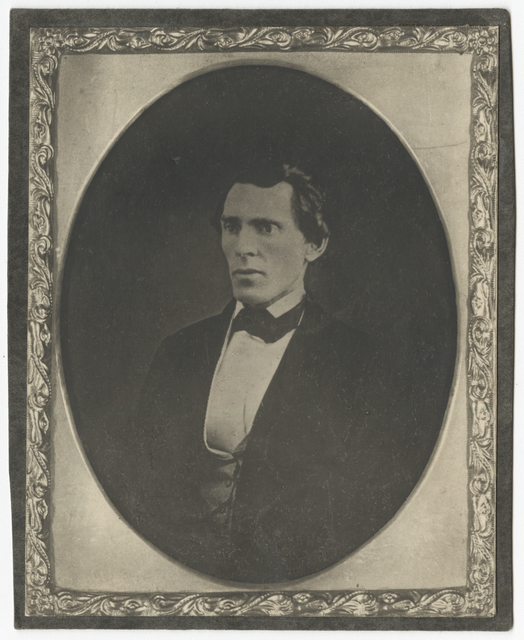
- North in 1848

Minnesota Territorial House of Representatives
- In office 1849–1851

Nevada Territorial Supreme Court
- In office 1863–1864

Personal details
- Born: January 4, 1815 Sand Lake, Rensselaer County, New York
- Died: February 22, 1890 Fresno, California
- Party: Republican

John Wesley North (January 4, 1815 – February 22, 1890) was an American abolitionist, lawyer, and politician. A founder of the Republican Party of Minnesota, North also served in Minnesota's constitutional convention. As a legislator in the Minnesota Territorial Legislature, North was influential in founding the University of Minnesota. He was appointed as Nevada's first surveyor general and as an associate justice on Nevada's territorial Supreme Court.

He was the founder of the cities of Northfield, Minnesota and Riverside, California.

== Early life and career ==
North was born near Sand Lake, New York on January 4, 1815. North's family was associated with the Methodist Church, as the Second Great Awakening swept New England and New York State in the early 19th-century. North's father travelled as a preacher.

Through a professional connection with the Reverend Arnold Scholefield, North met Gerrit Smith. Smith, a wealthy leader of the abolitionist movement, was an important influence in North's embrace of anti-slavery.

In 1838, North enrolled at Wesleyan University. After achieving local recognition in an impromptu debate with the pro-slavery minister Francis Hodgson, North was invited by the Connecticut Anti-Slavery Society to work as a lecturer. As he gained attention, North's lay license to practice ministry on behalf of the Methodist Episcopal Church was challenged by Augustus William Smith. Though North survived the challenge, he resigned his license.

North founded Wesleyan's Anti-Slavery Society and, after graduation, continued to lecture for two years across Connecticut.

North also practiced law, forming connections with the anti-slavery lawyers and educators Joshua Leavitt, Beriah Green, and William Burleigh, among others. North's relationship with John Greenleaf Whittier from this era would remain a profound influence on his later life.

== Marriage and family ==
North's first wife was Emma Bacon, whom he married in 1845. She died of tuberculosis in 1847.

Ann Loomis North

In 1848, North married Ann Hendrix Loomis, who was fifteen years his junior and the daughter of Dr. George S. Loomis. Together, they had seven children, four of which were born in Minnesota. She was an ardent supporter of the temperance cause, as well as women's suffrage, beliefs which were shared by her husband.

== Career in Minnesota ==
North struggled as a lawyer. Seeking new financial opportunities, John and Ann North travelled to Minnesota Territory in 1849, settling in St. Anthony, near the growing cities of Minneapolis and Saint Paul. North settled in St. Anthony at the request of Franklin Steele, agreeing to serve as his legal counsel.

The political leadership of the Territory, men like Henry Hastings Sibley and Henry Mower Rice, were associated with the national Democratic Party, a consequence of the connection between the fur trade and the regional Democrats. Territorial governor Alexander Ramsey, appointed by Whig President Zachary Taylor, led local political opposition to the influence of the Democrats and the fur trade.

Through a letter-writing campaign that targeted abolitionist reform newspapers and made use of the Norths' political connections, the Norths encouraged several thousand Eastern settlers to move to St. Anthony. John and Ann North's aggressive and selective promotion doubled the population of St. Anthony, pushing the political character of the community towards temperance and abolitionism and reducing the power of the Democratic Party.

=== Founding Northfield, Minnesota ===
In January 1855, North travelled south from St. Anthony to visit the Cannon River Valley. On that trip, he purchased interests in the town of Faribault and met with nearby settlers along the Cannon River, organizing a plan for the construction of a saw mill, a grist mill, and a bridge at a convenient site.

A year later, the construction projects neared completion, a townsite was platted, and John and Ann moved their family to the town. A meeting of settlers named the town Northfield.

=== Political career ===
North's successful campaign to populate St. Anthony with anti-slavery reformers led to his election to the Minnesota Territorial Legislature in 1851.

On March 29, 1855, several hundred men met in the St. Anthony Congregational church to organize Minnesota's Republican Party. North called the meeting to order. John and Ann North prepared the party's resolutions, which John presented at the March party meeting. North's resolutions included the abolition of slavery in new states, the repeal of the Fugitive Slave Act, and the prohibition of alcohol, among other resolutions. In 1860, North was a delegate to the Chicago Republican Convention which nominated Abraham Lincoln for the presidency of the United States, and he was a member of the committee that went to Springfield to notify Lincoln of his nomination.

== Career in Nevada ==
In 1861 President Lincoln appointed North the official surveyor of the new Territory of Nevada, and North moved to Virginia City, Nevada. The territorial surveyor was a sensitive position in a mining region such as Nevada's Comstock Lode, where the boundaries of mining claims were the constant subject of lawsuits. Lincoln may have counted on North to keep Nevada Territory loyal to the Union, and to bring Nevada in as a Republican state, as he had Minnesota. North surveyed, invested in silver mining properties, began building an ore-treatment mill he named the Minnesota Mill, and practiced law.

In early 1863, when Justice Gordon Mott's resignation from the Supreme Court of Nevada Territory was a certainty, Judge Horatio M. Jones recommended North for the vacancy. On August 20, 1863, Lincoln granted North a temporary appointment to Nevada's highest court, the predecessor of the United States District Court for the District of Nevada. Initially, North won praise both for his decisions and for removing the backlog of cases on his docket. He was also elected president of the 1863 constitutional convention (in Carson City) assigned to draft a proposed state constitution for Nevada. In both positions he clashed with William M. Stewart, a prominent lawyer with political ambitions and large mining companies as clients. North's rulings supported the "many-ledge" interpretation of mining law on the Comstock Lode, which favored the smaller mining companies over the larger companies that were Stewart's clients.

Stewart accused North of accepting bribes from litigants. North denied the charge, and Stewart was forced to publicly recant, but Stewart continued to attack North's honesty, and orchestrated a campaign against North in the Nevada newspapers allied with Stewart. Other newspapers supported North.

North resigned because of ill health after less than a year on the bench, but sued Stewart for slander. North agreed to submit his suit to arbitration, and after hearing both sides, the court declared that Stewart had indeed slandered North, and that there was no evidence that North had engaged in corruption. Nevertheless, North left the Territory for California, and Stewart remained and became the U.S. Senator from the new state of Nevada.

== Career in Tennessee ==
During Reconstruction in 1866, North left Nevada for Knoxville, Tennessee. North invested in a foundry, but his goal was to organize a mixed-race colony. These intentions, as well as North's interference in an attempted lynching, led to boycotts of his business interests, and North left Knoxville.

== Career in California ==
John W. North in old age

=== Founding Riverside, California ===
In 1870, North founded the southern California town of Riverside along with associates—some from Minnesota—who joined him there.

In 1879, he and his family moved north to San Francisco and joined a law firm. That year, North was nominated, but did not win, the Republican nomination to the California Supreme Court. In 1880, he became the general agent for the Washington Irrigated Colony, near Fresno, California. He opened a law office in Fresno, built a house and started a farm in nearby small community of Oleander. His wife did not join him in this move.

=== Death ===
John North died in Fresno on February 22, 1890, and was buried in Riverside's Evergreen Cemetery.

John W. North High School and the John W. North Water Treatment Plant are located in Riverside and named after him.

Preceded by	Territorial House 1851 (District 5); Republican Constitutional Convention 1857 (District 6); 1851 and 1867	Succeeded by
