= Samuel Burkleo =

Member of the Minnesota Territorial Council
- In office September 3, 1849 – January 6, 1852
- Preceded by: Position established
- Succeeded by: George W. Farrington

Personal details
- Born: March 31, 1800 Kent County, Delaware
- Died: c. 1874 Lakeland, Minnesota
- Party: Whig
- Occupation: Merchant

Samuel Burkleo (March 31, 1800–c. 1874) was an American merchant and politician who served in the Minnesota Territorial Council from 1849 until 1852.

== Biography ==
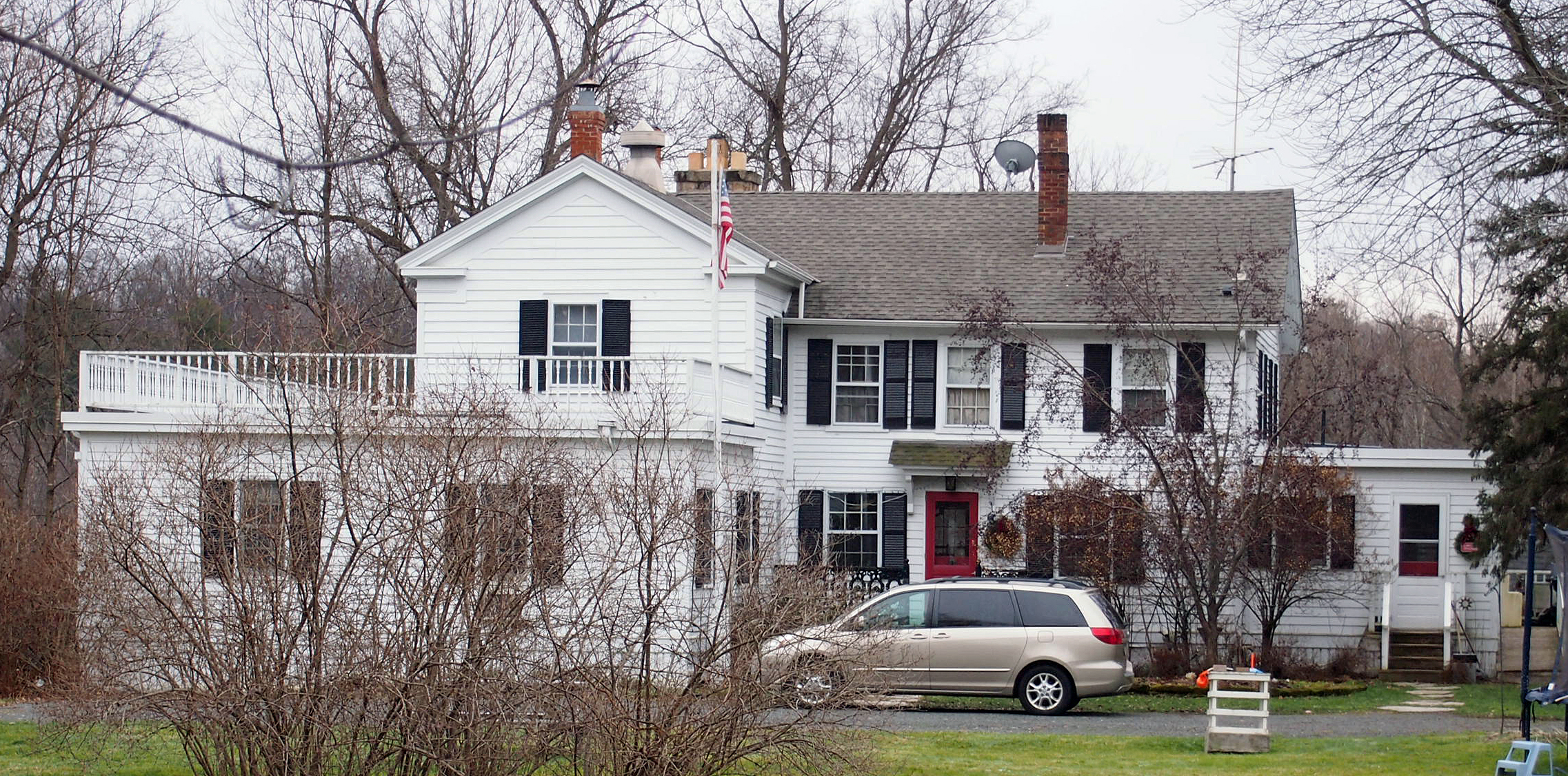
The Samuel Burkleo House, a contributing property to the Marine on St. Croix historic district

Burkleo was born in Kent County, Delaware, on March 31, 1800. He settled along the St. Croix River around 1839 and was one of the original proprietors of the Marine Lumber Company. He then moved to Stillwater and became a merchant.

Burkleo was elected to the Minnesota Territorial Council in 1849 and served until 1852. Burkleo introduced a bill that would split the Territory into eight counties, though many of his proposed names were later changed. Burkleo was a Whig.

In 1858, Burkleo moved to a farm in Lakeland, where he died sometime around 1864–1874.

He had a wife, Susanna. His Greek Revival house in Marine on St. Croix, built in 1848, is a contributing property to the historic district there. It was the first frame dwelling in Marine and was constructed by the Lumber Company.
