= Alfred Brunson =

American clergyman and politician

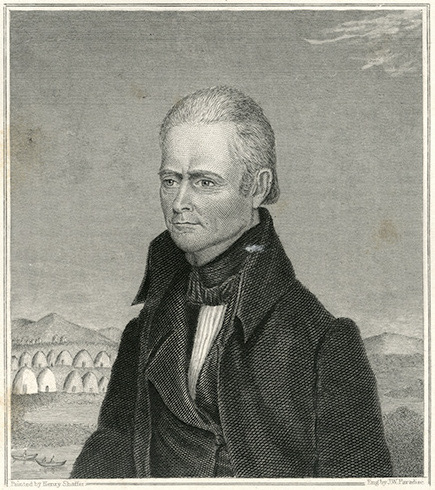
- 1837 (age 44)
- Born: February 9, 1793; Danbury, Connecticut
- Died: August 3, 1882 (aged 89)
- Occupations: Methodist circuit rider, lawyer, and territorial legislator
- Children: Ira B. Brunson; Benjamin Wetherill Brunson
- Relatives: Thomas P. Burnett (son-in-law)

Alfred Brunson (February 9, 1793 – August 3, 1882) was an American Methodist missionary and circuit rider, lawyer, and territorial legislator.

== Biography ==
Born in Danbury, Connecticut, Brunson served in the War of 1812. Brunson was a Methodist church circuit rider in Ohio and Pennsylvania.

In 1835, he moved to Prairie du Chien, Michigan Territory and was a Methodist circuit rider.

In 1836, Brunson was searching for someone who spoke the Dakota language and shared his Methodist values to serve as an interpreter for his mission work. He chose James Thompson, who was enslaved to military officer William Day and was married to a Dakota woman, the daughter of Mahipiya Wicasta (Cloud Man). Brunson wrote to Methodist journals and others out East in order to raise $1,200 to free Thompson from his enslaver. Thompson was freed by spring of 1837, and returned to Fort Snelling with Brunson. They began the areas first Methodist mission at Kaposia, with land and support from Dakota leader Wakinyatanka "Big Thunder" (Little Crow III). After Wakinyatanka revoked his acceptance of the mission and attendance waned, and with Brunson ill and away from the mission, the mission closed.

He studied law and was admitted to the Wisconsin bar in 1839. He served in the Wisconsin Territorial House of Representatives of the Wisconsin Territorial Legislature from 1840 to 1841 as a Whig.

During the American Civil War, Brunson served as a chaplain of the 31st Wisconsin Volunteer Infantry Regiment. He retired from the ministry in 1871. He also wrote including his autobiography. His son was Ira B. Brunson who also served in the Wisconsin Territorial Legislature. His son in law was Thomas P. Burnett. Brunson died in Prairie du Chien, Wisconsin.
