= Sylvanus Trask =

American schoolteacher and politician

Member of the Minnesota Territorial House of Representatives
- In office September 3, 1849 – January 6, 1852

Personal details
- Born: 1811 Otsego County, New York
- Died: 1897 (aged 85–86) Stillwater, Minnesota
- Party: Democratic
- Occupation: Schoolteacher

Sylvanus Trask (1811–1897) was an American schoolteacher and politician who served in the Minnesota Territorial House of Representatives from 1849 to 1852.

== Biography ==
Trask was born in Otsego County, New York, in 1811. He arrived in Stillwater, Minnesota, in 1848 and served as a schoolteacher. He served in the Territorial House for the first two sessions as member of the Democratic Party. On January 20, 1852, he was appointed as the secretary of the 3rd Minnesota Territorial Legislature. Following his political career, he was a surveyor in the lumber industry. He died in Stillwater in April 1897.
