= John A. Ford =

American merchant and politician

Member of the Minnesota Territorial House of Representatives
- In office January 1, 1851 – March 29, 1851

Personal details
- Born: 1811 New York
- Died: May 9, 1895 (aged 83–84) Woodbury, Minnesota
- Party: Democratic
- Occupation: Merchant

John A. Ford (1811–1895) was an American merchant and politician who served in the Minnesota Territorial House of Representatives from January 1, 1851, until March 29, 1851, when he resigned from his position.

== Biography ==
Ford was born in New York around 1811. He moved westward with his father in 1834, residing on a land claim in present-day Chicago. In 1841, he arrived in Red Rock, Minnesota, and became the first established merchant in Washington County, excluding fur traders. In 1847, he was a part of the state's first ever grand jury, where he and his peers indicted two members of the Ojibwe tribe for the murder of Henry Rust, a trading clerk.

In 1849, Ford served as a vice-president for the state's first Democratic Party convention. In 1851, he served in Minnesota's Territorial House of Representatives. However, on March 29 of that same year, he resigned his post in protest of the territory's new reapportionment bill, citing incorrect census counts.

Ford would continue to engage in trading until the mid-1850s, where he would engage in farming. Ford died in Red Rock (now known as Woodbury) on May 9, 1895, at the age of 84.
