= William R. Sturgis =

Member of the Minnesota Territorial Council
- In office September 3, 1849 – January 6, 1852

Member of the Minnesota Territorial House of Representatives
- In office January 2, 1856 – January 6, 1857

Personal details
- Born: 1817 Upper Canada
- Died: 1901 (aged 83–84)
- Party: Democratic
- Occupation: Farmer

William R. Sturgis (Note: His last name was alternatively spelled as Sturges) (1817–1901) was a Canadian-American farmer, lumberman, and politician who served in the Minnesota Territorial Council from 1849 until 1852 and in the Minnesota Territorial House of Representatives for the 1856 session. He was among the first white men to settle in Montana and was influential in developing the area.

== Biography ==
Sturgis was born in Upper Canada in 1817. His family moved around, most notably in the state of Michigan. The city of Sturgis was named after his father. When he was eighteen, he bought a piece of land that would later be a part of Iowa City. He helped make the city the capital of Iowa Territory. He later moved to Cedar Falls and built a dam and mill there. He also owned a mill in Waterloo.

He came to what is now Saint Paul and bought several pieces of land that make up the city. He was elected to both the Territorial Council and the House, with his place of residence listed as Elk River, Minnesota. He resigned his House seat and Allan Morrison was elected to fill the spot. He was a Democrat.

He was elected to the Territorial House again for the 1856 session. His place of residence was listed as Little Falls, Minnesota. He had built a sawmill and dam there and located the townsite.

Sturgis left Little Falls in 1862 to pursue gold in California. Along the way, he stopped near Dillon, Montana. He built a stage stop and stage road there, which shortened the route from Salt Lake City to the northern part of Montana. He would build the first sawmill in the area in Bannack. He built another mill in Argenta, meaning at one time he operated two mills, a ranch, and a stage stop at the same time. Sturgis was in a party that discovered the Hecla lead mine.

In 1873, with the high altitudes affecting his health, Sturgis returned to Sturgis, Michigan. He died in Florida in 1901.
