= List of counties in Minnesota =

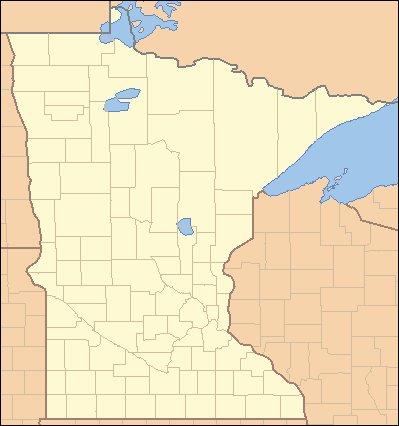

There are 87 counties in the U.S. state of Minnesota. There are also several historical counties.

On October 27, 1849, nine counties were established: Benton, Dahkotah, Itasca, Ramsey, Mahkahta, Pembina, Wabasha, Washington, and Wahnata. Six of these names still exist. With the foundation of Kittson County on March 9, 1878, Pembina County no longer existed. When Minnesota was organized as a state, 57 of the present 87 counties were established. The last county to be created was Lake of the Woods County in 1923.

The names of many of the counties allude to the long history of exploration. Over ten counties are named for Native American groups residing in parts of what is now Minnesota. Another fifteen counties are named after physical geographic features, and the remainder for politicians.

The FIPS county code is the five-digit Federal Information Processing Standard (FIPS) code which uniquely identifies counties and county equivalents in the United States. The three-digit number is unique to each individual county within a state, but to be unique within the entire United States, it must be prefixed by the state code. This means that, for example, the number 001 is shared by Aitkin County, Minnesota, Adams County, Wisconsin, and Adair County, Iowa. To uniquely identify Aitkin County, Minnesota, one must use the state code of 27 plus the county code of 001; therefore, the unique nationwide identifier for Aitkin County, Minnesota is 27001. The links in the column FIPS County Code are to the Census Bureau Info page for that county.

== List ==
County	FIPS code	County seat	Est.	Origin	Etymology	Density (/km^{2})	Population	Area	Map
Aitkin County	001	Aitkin	May 23, 1857	Pine County, Ramsey County	William Alexander Aitken (1785–1851), early fur trader with Ojibwe Indians	3.45	16,252	1,819.30 sq mi (4,712 km^{2})	State map highlighting Aitkin County
Anoka County	003	Anoka	May 23, 1857	Ramsey County	Dakota word meaning "both sides"	347.86	381,605	423.61 sq mi (1,097 km^{2})	State map highlighting Anoka County
Becker County	005	Detroit Lakes	March 18, 1858	Cass County, Pembina County	George Loomis Becker, former state senator and third mayor of Saint Paul (1856–1857)	10.46	35,497	1,310.42 sq mi (3,394 km^{2})	State map highlighting Becker County
Beltrami County	007	Bemidji	February 28, 1866	Unorganized Territory, Itasca County, Pembina County, Polk County	Giacomo Beltrami, Italian explorer who explored the northern reaches of Mississippi River in 1823	7.25	47,055	2,505.27 sq mi (6,489 km^{2})	State map highlighting Beltrami County
Benton County	009	Foley	October 27, 1849	One of nine original counties; formed from residual St. Croix County, Wisconsin Territory	Thomas Hart Benton (1782–1858), former United States Senator from Missouri (1821–1851)	39.49	41,744	408.28 sq mi (1,057 km^{2})	State map highlighting Benton County
Big Stone County	011	Ortonville	February 20, 1862	Pierce County	Big Stone Lake	3.93	5,054	496.95 sq mi (1,287 km^{2})	State map highlighting Big Stone County
Blue Earth County	013	Mankato	March 5, 1853	Unorganized Territory, Dakota County	Blue Earth River	36.24	70,634	752.36 sq mi (1,949 km^{2})	State map highlighting Blue Earth County
Brown County	015	New Ulm	February 20, 1855	Blue Earth County	Joseph Renshaw Brown (1805–1870), member of Minnesota territorial legislature (1854–55) and prominent pioneer	16.13	25,517	610.86 sq mi (1,582 km^{2})	State map highlighting Brown County
Carlton County	017	Carlton	May 23, 1857	Pine County, Saint Louis County	Rueben B. Carlton (1812–1863), early settler and state senator (1857–1858)	16.48	36,711	860.33 sq mi (2,228 km^{2})	State map highlighting Carlton County
Carver County	019	Chaska	February 20, 1855	Hennepin County, Sibley County	Jonathan Carver (1710–1790), early explorer and cartographer of the Mississippi river	123.65	114,379	357.04 sq mi (925 km^{2})	State map highlighting Carver County
Cass County	021	Walker	May 1, 1851	Dakota County, Pembina County, Mankahto County, Wahnata County	Lewis Cass (1782–1866), senator from Michigan (1845–1857) and United States Secretary of State (1857–1860)	6.01	31,430	2,017.60 sq mi (5,226 km^{2})	State map highlighting Cass County
Chippewa County	023	Montevideo	February 20, 1862	Pierce County, Davis County	Chippewa River	8.22	12,406	582.80 sq mi (1,509 km^{2})	State map highlighting Chippewa County
Chisago County	025	Center City	May 1, 1851	Washington County, Ramsey County	Chisago Lake	54.66	59,142	417.63 sq mi (1,082 km^{2})	State map highlighting Chisago County
Clay County	027	Moorhead	March 18, 1858	Pembina County	Henry Clay (1777–1852), Kentucky statesman and ninth secretary of state of the United States (1825–1829)	25.02	67,734	1,045.24 sq mi (2,707 km^{2})	State map highlighting Clay County
Clearwater County	029	Bagley	November 4, 1902	Beltrami County	Clearwater River and Clearwater Lake	3.36	8,647	994.71 sq mi (2,576 km^{2})	State map highlighting Clearwater County
Cook County	031	Grand Marais	November 3, 1874	Lake County	Named for Civil War veteran Major Michael Cook (1828-1864) of Faribault, who was also a territorial and state senator 1857–62	1.47	5,522	1,450.60 sq mi (3,757 km^{2})	State map highlighting Cook County
Cottonwood County	033	Windom	May 23, 1857	Brown County	Cottonwood River	6.88	11,405	639.99 sq mi (1,658 km^{2})	State map highlighting Cottonwood County
Crow Wing County	035	Brainerd	May 23, 1857	Ramsey County	Crow Wing River	26.78	69,132	996.57 sq mi (2,581 km^{2})	State map highlighting Crow Wing County
Dakota County	037	Hastings	October 27, 1849	One of nine original counties	From the Dakota language, after a local tribe Dakota, meaning "Allies"	310.31	457,710	569.58 sq mi (1,475 km^{2})	State map highlighting Dakota County
Dodge County	039	Mantorville	February 20, 1855	Rice County, Unorganized Territory	Henry Dodge (1782–1867), two-time governor of Wisconsin	18.78	21,376	439.50 sq mi (1,138 km^{2})	State map highlighting Dodge County
Douglas County	041	Alexandria	March 8, 1858	Cass County, Pembina County	Stephen Arnold Douglas (1813–1861), former United States Senator from Illinois (1847–1861)	24.42	40,120	634.32 sq mi (1,643 km^{2})	State map highlighting Douglas County
Faribault County	043	Blue Earth	February 20, 1855	Blue Earth County	Jean-Baptiste Faribault (1775–1860), early settler and fur trader	7.52	13,888	713.63 sq mi (1,848 km^{2})	State map highlighting Faribault County
Fillmore County	045	Preston	March 5, 1853	Wabasha County	Millard Fillmore (1800–1874), thirteenth president of the United States (1850–1853)	9.65	21,540	861.25 sq mi (2,231 km^{2})	State map highlighting Fillmore County
Freeborn County	047	Albert Lea	February 20, 1855	Blue Earth County, Rice County	William S. Freeborn (1816–1900), member of the Territorial Legislature	16.61	30,440	707.64 sq mi (1,833 km^{2})	State map highlighting Freeborn County
Goodhue County	049	Red Wing	March 5, 1853	Wabasha County, Dakota County	James Madison Goodhue, the first newspaper editor in Minnesota	24.54	48,195	758.27 sq mi (1,964 km^{2})	State map highlighting Goodhue County
Grant County	051	Elbow Lake	March 6, 1868	Stevens County, Wilkin County, Traverse County	Ulysses S. Grant (1822–1885), eighteenth president of the United States (1869–1877)	4.30	6,085	546.41 sq mi (1,415 km^{2})	State map highlighting Grant County
Hennepin County	053	Minneapolis	March 6, 1852	Dakota County	Father Louis Hennepin (1626–1705), early explorer of the Twin Cities area in the 17th century	890.97	1,284,784	556.62 sq mi (1,442 km^{2})	State map highlighting Hennepin County
Houston County	055	Caledonia	February 23, 1854	Fillmore County	Sam Houston (1793–1863), the second and fourth president of the Republic of Texas and seventh governor of Texas	12.72	18,400	558.41 sq mi (1,446 km^{2})	State map highlighting Houston County
Hubbard County	057	Park Rapids	February 26, 1883	Cass County	Lucius Frederick Hubbard (1836–1913), ninth governor of Minnesota (1882–1887)	9.36	22,369	922.46 sq mi (2,389 km^{2})	State map highlighting Hubbard County
Isanti County	059	Cambridge	February 13, 1857	Ramsey County	Division of the Dakotas called the Isáŋyathi or Santee, meaning [those that] dwell at Knife Lake, after where they resided	39.04	44,386	439.07 sq mi (1,137 km^{2})	State map highlighting Isanti County
Itasca County	061	Grand Rapids	October 27, 1849	One of nine original counties; formed from residual La Pointe County, Wisconsin Territory	Lake Itasca, source of the Mississippi River (located in northwestern Minnesota)	6.58	45,404	2,665.06 sq mi (6,902 km^{2})	State map highlighting Itasca County
Jackson County	063	Jackson	May 23, 1857	Brown County	Henry Jackson, member of the first territorial legislature and the first merchant in St. Paul	5.42	9,857	701.69 sq mi (1,817 km^{2})	State map highlighting Jackson County
Kanabec County	065	Mora	October 12, 1858	Pine County	From the Ojibwe language Kan-a-bec-o-si-pi (Ginebigo-ziibi), meaning Snake River, which flows through the county	12.23	16,628	524.93 sq mi (1,360 km^{2})	State map highlighting Kanabec County
Kandiyohi County	067	Willmar	October 12, 1858	Meeker County, Renville County, Pierce County, Davis County, Stearns County	From the Sioux language for "buffalo fish"	21.69	44,720	796.06 sq mi (2,062 km^{2})	State map highlighting Kandiyohi County
Kittson County	069	Hallock	October 27, 1849	Pembina County	Norman Kittson (1814–1888), businessman and mayor of Saint Paul (1858–1859)	1.42	4,031	1,097.08 sq mi (2,841 km^{2})	State map highlighting Kittson County
Koochiching County	071	International Falls	November 6, 1906	Itasca County	From the Ojibwe language Gojijiing (Place of inlets), which was the Cree name for Rainy Lake and Rainy River	1.44	11,587	3,102.36 sq mi (8,035 km^{2})	State map highlighting Koochiching County
Lac qui Parle County	073	Madison	November 7, 1871	Redwood County	From the French language for "lake which talks"	3.38	6,704	764.87 sq mi (1,981 km^{2})	State map highlighting Lac qui Parle County
Lake County	075	Two Harbors	February 20, 1855	Itasca County	Lake Superior, which forms one of its edges	1.98	10,746	2,099.16 sq mi (5,437 km^{2})	State map highlighting Lake County
Lake of the Woods County	077	Baudette	November 7, 1922	Beltrami County	Lake of the Woods, a lake located within the county	1.12	3,770	1,296.70 sq mi (3,358 km^{2})	State map highlighting Lake of the Woods County
Le Sueur County	079	Le Center	March 5, 1853	Dakota County	Pierre-Charles Le Sueur (1657–1704), fur trader and early explorer of the Minnesota River Valley	25.35	29,453	448.50 sq mi (1,162 km^{2})	State map highlighting Le Sueur County
Lincoln County	081	Ivanhoe	November 4, 1873	Lyon County	Abraham Lincoln (1809–1865), sixteenth president of the United States (1861–1865)	4.01	5,583	537.03 sq mi (1,391 km^{2})	State map highlighting Lincoln County
Lyon County	083	Marshall	November 2, 1869	Redwood County	Nathaniel Lyon (1818–1861), United States Army general killed during the Civil War	13.88	25,684	714.17 sq mi (1,850 km^{2})	State map highlighting Lyon County
McLeod County	085	Glencoe	March 1, 1856	Carver County, Sibley County	Martin McLeod, early pioneer and member of the territorial legislature (1849–1856)	28.75	36,631	491.91 sq mi (1,274 km^{2})	State map highlighting McLeod County
Mahnomen County	087	Mahnomen	November 6, 1906	Norman County	From the Ojibwe language meaning "wild rice"	3.58	5,153	556.14 sq mi (1,440 km^{2})	State map highlighting Mahnomen County
Marshall County	089	Warren	February 25, 1879	Kittson County	William Rainey Marshall (1825–1896), fifth governor of Minnesota (1866–1870)	1.92	8,798	1,772.24 sq mi (4,590 km^{2})	State map highlighting Marshall County
Martin County	091	Fairmont	May 23, 1857	Faribault County, Brown County	Morgan Lewis Martin (1805–1887), delegate to Congress from Wisconsin Territory	10.58	19,440	709.34 sq mi (1,837 km^{2})	State map highlighting Martin County
Meeker County	093	Litchfield	February 23, 1856	Davis County	Bradley B. Meeker (1813–1873), Associate Justice of the Minnesota Territorial Supreme Court (1849–1853)	14.98	23,603	608.54 sq mi (1,576 km^{2})	State map highlighting Meeker County
Mille Lacs County	095	Milaca	May 23, 1857	Ramsey County	Mille Lacs Lake	18.65	27,753	574.47 sq mi (1,488 km^{2})	State map highlighting Mille Lacs County
Morrison County	097	Little Falls	February 25, 1856	Benton County	William & Allan Morrison, fur trading brothers	11.89	34,620	1,124.50 sq mi (2,912 km^{2})	State map highlighting Morrison County
Mower County	099	Austin	February 20, 1855	Rice County	John Edward Mower (1815–1879), member of the Minnesota territorial legislature in the 1850s	22.23	40,971	711.50 sq mi (1,843 km^{2})	State map highlighting Mower County
Murray County	101	Slayton	May 23, 1857	Brown County	William Pitt Murray (1825–1910), Minnesota statesman and member of the territorial legislature (1852–1855) and 1857	4.35	7,942	704.43 sq mi (1,824 km^{2})	State map highlighting Murray County
Nicollet County	103	St. Peter	March 5, 1853	Dakota County	Joseph Nicolas Nicollet (1786–1843), early explorer and cartographer of the Upper Mississippi River	29.27	34,273	452.29 sq mi (1,171 km^{2})	State map highlighting Nicollet County
Nobles County	105	Worthington	May 23, 1857	Brown County	William H. Nobles, member of the Minnesota territorial legislature in 1854 and 1856	12.06	22,338	715.39 sq mi (1,853 km^{2})	State map highlighting Nobles County
Norman County	107	Ada	November 8, 1881	Polk County	Early Norwegian, also known as Norman, settlers.	2.79	6,336	876.27 sq mi (2,270 km^{2})	State map highlighting Norman County
Olmsted County	109	Rochester	February 20, 1855	Fillmore County, Wabasha County, Rice County	David Olmsted, first mayor of Saint Paul and member of territorial legislature (1849–1850)	98.60	166,731	653.01 sq mi (1,691 km^{2})	State map highlighting Olmsted County
Otter Tail County	111	Fergus Falls	March 18, 1858	Pembina County, Cass County	Otter Tail Lake	11.91	61,041	1,979.71 sq mi (5,127 km^{2})	State map highlighting Otter Tail County
Pennington County	113	Thief River Falls	November 8, 1910	Red Lake County	Edmund Pennington (1848-1926), executive of the Minneapolis, St. Paul and Sault Ste. Marie Railroad	8.57	13,686	616.54 sq mi (1,597 km^{2})	State map highlighting Pennington County
Pine County	115	Pine City	March 1, 1856	Chisago County, Ramsey County	Giant forests of Eastern White Pine and Red Pine that flourish in the county	8.34	30,472	1,411.04 sq mi (3,655 km^{2})	State map highlighting Pine County
Pipestone County	117	Pipestone	May 23, 1857	Brown County	Name of a sacred Dakota quarry of red pipestone found in the county	7.67	9,260	465.89 sq mi (1,207 km^{2})	State map highlighting Pipestone County
Polk County	119	Crookston	July 20, 1858	Pembina County	James K. Polk (1795–1849), eleventh president of the United States (1845–1849)	5.99	30,545	1,970.37 sq mi (5,103 km^{2})	State map highlighting Polk County
Pope County	121	Glenwood	February 20, 1862	Pierce County, Cass County, Unorganized Territory	John Pope (1822–1892), United States Army general during the Dakota War of 1862	6.58	11,420	670.14 sq mi (1,736 km^{2})	State map highlighting Pope County
Ramsey County	123	Saint Paul	October 27, 1849	One of nine original counties; formed from residual St. Croix County, Wisconsin Territory	Alexander Ramsey (1815–1903), first governor of Minnesota Territory (1849–1853)	1343.98	541,623	155.78 sq mi (403 km^{2})	State map highlighting Ramsey County
Red Lake County	125	Red Lake Falls	November 3, 1896	Polk County	Red Lake River	3.52	3,940	432.43 sq mi (1,120 km^{2})	State map highlighting Red Lake County
Redwood County	127	Redwood Falls	November 4, 1862	Brown County	Redwood River	6.70	15,265	879.73 sq mi (2,278 km^{2})	State map highlighting Redwood County
Renville County	129	Olivia	February 20, 1855	Nicollet County, Pierce County, Sibley County	Joseph Renville (1779–1846), interpreter for early explorations of the Louisiana Purchase	5.64	14,356	982.92 sq mi (2,546 km^{2})	State map highlighting Renville County
Rice County	131	Faribault	March 5, 1853	Dakota County, Wabasha County	Henry Mower Rice (1816–1894), former United States Senator from Minnesota (1858–1863)	54.26	69,939	497.57 sq mi (1,289 km^{2})	State map highlighting Rice County
Rock County	133	Luverne	May 23, 1857	Brown County	Large rocky plateau located within the county, known as "the mound"	7.62	9,524	482.61 sq mi (1,250 km^{2})	State map highlighting Rock County
Roseau County	135	Roseau	November 6, 1894	Kittson County, Beltrami County	Roseau River and Roseau Lake	3.54	15,246	1,662.51 sq mi (4,306 km^{2})	State map highlighting Roseau County
Saint Louis County	137	Duluth	March 1, 1856	Itasca County, Newton	Saint Louis River	12.44	200,518	6,225.16 sq mi (16,123 km^{2})	State map highlighting Saint Louis County
Scott County	139	Shakopee	March 5, 1853	Dakota County	Winfield Scott (1786–1866), United States Army general who served from (1808–1861)	172.10	159,017	356.68 sq mi (924 km^{2})	State map highlighting Scott County
Sherburne County	141	Elk River	February 25, 1856	Benton County	Moses Sherburne (1813–1873), Associate Justice of the Minnesota Territorial Supreme Court (1853–1857)	92.21	104,194	436.30 sq mi (1,130 km^{2})	State map highlighting Sherburne County
Sibley County	143	Gaylord	March 5, 1853	Dakota County	Henry Hastings Sibley (1811–1891), first governor of Minnesota (1858–1860)	10.07	15,356	588.65 sq mi (1,525 km^{2})	State map highlighting Sibley County
Stearns County	145	St. Cloud	February 20, 1855	Cass County, Nicollet County, Pierce County, Sibley County	Charles Thomas Stearns (1814–1888), early settler of St. Cloud and member of the Minnesota territorial legislature (1849–1858)	47.13	164,110	1,344.52 sq mi (3,482 km^{2})	State map highlighting Stearns County
Steele County	147	Owatonna	February 20, 1855	Rice County, Blue Earth County, Le Sueur County	Franklin Steele (1813–1880), early settler of Minneapolis and developer of Saint Anthony Falls	33.66	37,464	429.55 sq mi (1,113 km^{2})	State map highlighting Steele County
Stevens County	149	Morris	February 20, 1862	Pierce County, Unorganized Territory	Isaac Ingalls Stevens (1818–1862), first governor of Washington Territory (1853–1857)	6.69	9,747	562.06 sq mi (1,456 km^{2})	State map highlighting Stevens County
Swift County	151	Benson	November 8, 1870	Chippewa County	Henry Adoniram Swift (1823–1869), third governor of Minnesota (1863–1864)	5.07	9,763	743.53 sq mi (1,926 km^{2})	State map highlighting Swift County
Todd County	153	Long Prairie	February 20, 1855	Cass County	John Blair Smith Todd, commander of Fort Ripley (1849–56); general in the Civil War; delegate in Congress from Dakota Territory (1861 and 1863–65); governor of Dakota Territory (1869–71)	10.68	26,060	942.02 sq mi (2,440 km^{2})	State map highlighting Todd County
Traverse County	155	Wheaton	February 20, 1862	Pierce County, Unorganized Territory	Lake Traverse	2.10	3,130	574.09 sq mi (1,487 km^{2})	State map highlighting Traverse County
Wabasha County	157	Wabasha	October 27, 1849	One of nine original counties.	Named after M'dewakanton Dakota Indian Chief Wabasha III	15.84	21,537	525.01 sq mi (1,360 km^{2})	State map highlighting Wabasha County
Wadena County	159	Wadena	June 11, 1858	Cass County, Todd County	Sources differ; named after either an Ojibwe chief, Chief Wadena, or from the Ojibwe language for "a little round hill"	10.38	14,388	535.02 sq mi (1,386 km^{2})	State map highlighting Wadena County
Waseca County	161	Waseca	February 27, 1857	Steele County	Dakota word meaning "rich and fertile"	17.05	18,688	423.25 sq mi (1,096 km^{2})	State map highlighting Waseca County
Washington County	163	Stillwater	October 27, 1849	One of nine original counties; formed from residual St. Croix County, Wisconsin Territory	George Washington (1732–1799), first president of the United States (1789–1797)	282.93	286,895	391.70 sq mi (1,014 km^{2})	State map highlighting Washington County
Watonwan County	165	St. James	November 2, 1860	Brown County	Watonwan River, a river that flows through Minnesota.	10.19	11,459	434.51 sq mi (1,125 km^{2})	State map highlighting Watonwan County
Wilkin County	167	Breckenridge	March 18, 1858	Cass County, Pembina County	Alexander Wilkin (1820–1864), Minnesota politician and soldier killed in the Civil War	3.23	6,288	751.43 sq mi (1,946 km^{2})	State map highlighting Wilkin County
Winona County	169	Winona	February 23, 1854	Fillmore County, Wabasha County	Named after Wee-No-Nah, sister or cousin of Chief Wabasha III	31.15	50,523	626.30 sq mi (1,622 km^{2})	State map highlighting Winona County
Wright County	171	Buffalo	February 20, 1855	Cass County, Sibley County	Silas Wright (1795–1847), former United States Senator from New York (1833–1844)	92.09	157,559	660.75 sq mi (1,711 km^{2})	State map highlighting Wright County
Yellow Medicine County	173	Granite Falls	November 7, 1871	Redwood County	Yellow Medicine River	4.83	9,477	757.96 sq mi (1,963 km^{2})	State map highlighting Yellow Medicine County

== Racial / Ethnic Profile of counties in Minnesota (2020 Census) ==
Racial / Ethnic Profile of counties in Minnesota (2020 Census)
Following is a table of counties in Minnesota by race/ethnicity. The majority racial/ethnic group is coded per the key below.

Majority minority with no dominant group
Majority White
Majority Black
Majority Hispanic
Majority Asian
Majority Native American

Racial and ethnic composition of counties in Minnesota (2020 Census) (NH = Non-Hispanic) Note: the US Census treats Hispanic/Latino as an ethnic category. This table excludes Latinos from the racial categories and assigns them to a separate category. Hispanics/Latinos may be of any race.
County	Location of County	Total Population	White alone (NH)	%	Black or African American alone (NH)	%	Native American or Alaska Native alone (NH)	%	Asian alone (NH)	%	Pacific Islander alone (NH)	%	Other race alone (NH)	%	Mixed race or Multiracial (NH)	%	Hispanic or Latino (any race)	%
Aitkin		15,697	14,479	92.24%	58	0.37%	376	2.40%	38	0.24%	1	0.01%	25	0.16%	500	3.19%	220	1.40%
Anoka		363,887	276,205	75.90%	28,378	7.80%	1,912	0.53%	19,158	5.26%	93	0.03%	1,401	0.39%	17,234	4.74%	19,506	5.36%
Becker		35,183	29,645	84.26%	200	0.57%	2,417	6.87%	156	0.44%	9	0.03%	100	0.28%	2,081	5.91%	575	1.63%
Beltrami		46,228	32,445	70.18%	519	1.12%	9,198	19.90%	268	0.58%	15	0.03%	134	0.29%	2,541	5.50%	1,108	2.40%
Benton		41,379	35,821	86.57%	1,991	4.81%	184	0.44%	463	1.12%	8	0.02%	109	0.26%	1,587	3.84%	1,216	2.94%
Big Stone		5,166	4,809	93.09%	19	0.37%	34	0.66%	12	0.23%	4	0.08%	34	0.66%	114	2.21%	140	2.71%
Blue Earth		69,112	57,222	82.80%	3,873	5.60%	208	0.30%	1,834	2.65%	24	0.03%	247	0.36%	2,483	3.59%	3,221	4.66%
Brown		25,912	23,968	92.50%	118	0.46%	39	0.15%	126	0.49%	6	0.02%	20	0.08%	464	1.79%	1,171	4.52%
Carlton		36,207	30,910	85.37%	556	1.54%	2,148	5.93%	153	0.42%	12	0.03%	85	0.23%	1,731	4.78%	612	1.69%
Carver		106,922	91,443	85.52%	2,173	2.03%	193	0.18%	3,617	3.38%	15	0.01%	284	0.27%	3,889	3.64%	5,308	4.96%
Cass		30,066	24,675	82.07%	64	0.21%	3,424	11.39%	111	0.37%	0	0.00%	96	0.32%	1,270	4.22%	426	1.42%
Chippewa		12,598	10,473	83.13%	75	0.60%	102	0.81%	44	0.35%	296	2.35%	49	0.39%	316	2.51%	1,243	9.87%
Chisago		56,621	50,804	89.73%	845	1.49%	309	0.55%	768	1.36%	3	0.01%	185	0.33%	2,256	3.98%	1,451	2.56%
Clay		65,318	54,424	83.32%	3,141	4.81%	1,032	1.58%	764	1.17%	16	0.02%	134	0.21%	2,796	4.28%	3,011	4.61%
Clearwater		8,524	7,151	83.89%	19	0.22%	752	8.82%	23	0.27%	2	0.02%	22	0.26%	454	5.33%	101	1.18%
Cook		5,600	4,670	83.39%	25	0.45%	450	8.04%	48	0.86%	1	0.02%	25	0.45%	258	4.61%	123	2.20%
Cottonwood		11,517	9,418	81.77%	135	1.17%	25	0.22%	361	3.13%	80	0.69%	53	0.46%	330	2.87%	1,115	9.68%
Crow Wing		66,123	61,252	92.63%	383	0.58%	623	0.94%	332	0.50%	19	0.03%	240	0.36%	2,362	3.57%	912	1.38%
Dakota		439,882	323,629	73.57%	32,191	7.32%	1,490	0.34%	23,932	5.44%	184	0.04%	2,144	0.49%	20,007	4.55%	36,305	8.25%
Dodge		20,867	18,807	90.13%	126	0.60%	37	0.18%	104	0.50%	1	0.00%	65	0.31%	670	3.21%	1,057	5.07%
Douglas		39,006	36,629	93.91%	223	0.57%	104	0.27%	227	0.58%	11	0.03%	60	0.15%	937	2.40%	815	2.09%
Faribault		13,921	12,402	89.09%	55	0.40%	58	0.42%	45	0.32%	0	0.00%	39	0.28%	309	2.22%	1,013	7.28%
Fillmore		21,228	20,173	95.03%	98	0.46%	7	0.03%	71	0.33%	2	0.01%	65	0.31%	471	2.22%	341	1.61%
Freeborn		30,895	25,071	81.15%	460	1.49%	76	0.25%	1,135	3.67%	5	0.02%	79	0.26%	886	2.87%	3,183	10.30%
Goodhue		47,582	42,516	89.35%	661	1.39%	540	1.13%	348	0.73%	33	0.07%	155	0.33%	1,532	3.22%	1,797	3.78%
Grant		6,074	5,699	93.83%	13	0.21%	27	0.44%	14	0.23%	7	0.12%	4	0.07%	175	2.88%	135	2.22%
Hennepin		1,281,565	840,845	65.61%	169,603	13.23%	8,016	0.63%	97,348	7.60%	388	0.03%	6,127	0.48%	60,988	4.76%	98,250	7.67%
Houston		18,843	17,840	94.68%	90	0.48%	42	0.22%	101	0.54%	4	0.02%	31	0.16%	492	2.61%	243	1.29%
Hubbard		21,344	19,139	89.67%	82	0.38%	560	2.62%	66	0.31%	12	0.06%	56	0.26%	940	4.40%	489	2.29%
Isanti		41,135	37,559	91.31%	314	0.76%	201	0.49%	488	1.19%	13	0.03%	154	0.37%	1,510	3.67%	896	2.18%
Itasca		45,014	40,166	89.23%	174	0.39%	1,497	3.33%	145	0.32%	2	0.00%	125	0.28%	2,287	5.08%	618	1.37%
Jackson		9,989	9,026	90.36%	120	1.20%	22	0.22%	122	1.22%	0	0.00%	23	0.23%	275	2.75%	401	4.01%
Kanabec		16,032	14,954	93.28%	65	0.41%	113	0.70%	80	0.50%	0	0.00%	15	0.09%	567	3.54%	238	1.48%
Kandiyohi		43,732	33,303	76.15%	2,618	5.99%	115	0.26%	586	1.34%	37	0.08%	98	0.22%	1,059	2.42%	5,916	13.53%
Kittson		4,207	3,974	94.46%	1	0.02%	15	0.36%	17	0.40%	6	0.14%	14	0.33%	97	2.31%	83	1.97%
Koochiching		12,062	10,920	90.53%	44	0.36%	278	2.30%	34	0.28%	12	0.10%	30	0.25%	577	4.78%	167	1.38%
Lac qui Parle		6,719	6,244	92.93%	32	0.48%	10	0.15%	40	0.60%	0	0.00%	16	0.24%	175	2.60%	202	3.01%
Lake		10,905	10,281	94.28%	11	0.10%	50	0.46%	55	0.50%	0	0.00%	30	0.28%	365	3.35%	113	1.04%
Lake of the Woods		3,763	3,497	92.93%	12	0.32%	19	0.50%	17	0.45%	0	0.00%	13	0.35%	149	3.96%	56	1.49%
Le Sueur		28,674	25,463	88.80%	262	0.91%	67	0.23%	134	0.47%	20	0.07%	58	0.20%	798	2.78%	1,872	6.53%
Lincoln		5,640	5,368	95.18%	10	0.18%	11	0.20%	22	0.39%	0	0.00%	3	0.05%	119	2.11%	107	1.90%
Lyon		25,269	20,535	81.27%	906	3.59%	84	0.33%	1,263	5.00%	3	0.01%	41	0.16%	693	2.74%	1,744	6.90%
McLeod		36,771	32,559	88.55%	226	0.61%	102	0.28%	230	0.63%	27	0.07%	64	0.17%	1,008	2.74%	2,555	6.95%
Mahnomen		5,411	2,278	42.10%	8	0.15%	2,256	41.69%	7	0.13%	0	0.00%	17	0.31%	691	12.77%	154	2.85%
Marshall		9,040	8,332	92.17%	12	0.13%	29	0.32%	19	0.21%	0	0.00%	22	0.24%	236	2.61%	390	4.31%
Martin		20,025	17,947	89.62%	112	0.56%	32	0.16%	92	0.46%	6	0.03%	46	0.23%	470	2.35%	1,320	6.59%
Meeker		23,400	21,618	92.38%	93	0.40%	37	0.16%	59	0.25%	2	0.01%	49	0.21%	592	2.53%	950	4.06%
Mille Lacs		26,459	23,131	87.42%	78	0.29%	1,466	5.54%	124	0.47%	6	0.02%	98	0.37%	1,075	4.06%	481	1.82%
Morrison		34,010	32,032	94.18%	179	0.53%	111	0.33%	102	0.30%	5	0.01%	57	0.17%	891	2.62%	633	1.86%
Mower		40,029	29,804	74.46%	1,613	4.03%	57	0.14%	2,052	5.13%	255	0.64%	123	0.31%	1,044	2.61%	5,081	12.69%
Murray		8,179	7,483	91.49%	26	0.32%	9	0.11%	105	1.28%	3	0.04%	7	0.09%	164	2.01%	382	4.67%
Nicollet		34,454	29,287	85.00%	1,672	4.85%	141	0.41%	558	1.62%	10	0.03%	71	0.21%	915	2.66%	1,800	5.22%
Nobles		22,290	12,147	54.50%	978	4.39%	66	0.30%	1,329	5.96%	41	0.18%	42	0.19%	416	1.87%	7,271	32.62%
Norman		6,441	5,702	88.53%	17	0.26%	115	1.79%	18	0.28%	0	0.00%	32	0.50%	269	4.18%	288	4.47%
Olmsted		162,847	124,758	76.61%	10,959	6.73%	380	0.23%	10,190	6.26%	66	0.04%	548	0.34%	6,750	4.14%	9,196	5.65%
Otter Tail		60,081	54,362	90.48%	843	1.40%	284	0.47%	334	0.56%	17	0.03%	149	0.25%	1,876	3.12%	2,216	3.69%
Pennington		13,992	12,241	87.49%	177	1.27%	166	1.19%	121	0.86%	6	0.04%	48	0.34%	562	4.02%	671	4.80%
Pine		28,876	25,119	86.99%	470	1.63%	966	3.35%	264	0.91%	1	0.00%	98	0.34%	1,245	4.31%	713	2.47%
Pipestone		9,424	8,057	85.49%	107	1.14%	100	1.06%	66	0.70%	0	0.00%	19	0.20%	271	2.88%	804	8.53%
Polk		31,192	26,538	85.08%	958	3.07%	376	1.21%	156	0.50%	4	0.01%	71	0.23%	1,090	3.49%	1,999	6.41%
Pope		11,308	10,751	95.07%	34	0.30%	27	0.24%	50	0.44%	0	0.00%	20	0.18%	235	2.08%	191	1.69%
Ramsey		552,352	320,477	58.02%	70,101	12.69%	2,914	0.53%	85,875	15.55%	214	0.04%	2,339	0.42%	25,498	4.62%	45,034	8.15%
Red Lake		3,935	3,625	92.12%	15	0.38%	57	1.45%	5	0.13%	3	0.08%	14	0.36%	113	2.87%	103	2.62%
Redwood		15,425	13,123	85.08%	76	0.49%	774	5.02%	414	2.68%	1	0.01%	16	0.10%	525	3.40%	496	3.22%
Renville		14,723	12,766	86.71%	60	0.41%	103	0.70%	61	0.41%	5	0.03%	27	0.18%	382	2.59%	1,319	8.96%
Rice		67,097	51,523	76.79%	4,353	6.49%	297	0.44%	1,554	2.32%	10	0.01%	425	0.63%	2,152	3.21%	6,783	10.11%
Rock		9,704	8,886	91.57%	50	0.52%	48	0.49%	62	0.64%	10	0.10%	0	0.00%	284	2.93%	364	3.75%
Roseau		15,331	13,700	89.36%	85	0.55%	229	1.49%	398	2.60%	10	0.07%	56	0.37%	615	4.01%	238	1.55%
St. Louis		200,231	176,112	87.95%	4,075	2.04%	4,305	2.15%	1,901	0.95%	58	0.03%	579	0.29%	9,598	4.79%	3,603	1.80%
Scott		150,928	115,630	76.61%	8,137	5.39%	1,406	0.93%	9,939	6.59%	64	0.04%	607	0.40%	6,137	4.07%	9,008	5.97%
Sherburne		97,183	84,761	87.22%	3,648	3.75%	390	0.40%	1,277	1.31%	22	0.02%	313	0.32%	3,952	4.07%	2,820	2.90%
Sibley		14,836	12,942	87.23%	81	0.55%	30	0.20%	72	0.49%	10	0.07%	25	0.17%	361	2.43%	1,315	8.86%
Stearns		158,292	129,276	81.67%	13,224	8.35%	439	0.28%	3,159	2.00%	61	0.04%	435	0.27%	4,747	3.00%	6,951	4.39%
Steele		37,406	31,376	83.88%	1,359	3.63%	65	0.17%	330	0.88%	18	0.05%	58	0.16%	1,060	2.83%	3,140	8.39%
Stevens		9,671	8,093	83.68%	84	0.87%	110	1.14%	68	0.70%	1	0.01%	40	0.41%	289	2.99%	986	10.20%
Swift		9,838	8,618	87.60%	79	0.80%	26	0.26%	78	0.79%	133	1.35%	5	0.05%	237	2.41%	662	6.73%
Todd		25,262	22,117	87.55%	95	0.38%	76	0.30%	97	0.38%	72	0.29%	65	0.26%	532	2.11%	2,208	8.74%
Traverse		3,360	2,851	84.85%	21	0.62%	183	5.45%	0	0.00%	0	0.00%	5	0.15%	103	3.07%	197	5.86%
Wabasha		21,387	19,921	93.15%	121	0.57%	32	0.15%	97	0.45%	6	0.03%	20	0.09%	482	2.25%	708	3.31%
Wadena		14,065	13,044	92.74%	118	0.84%	73	0.52%	54	0.38%	9	0.06%	19	0.14%	475	3.38%	273	1.94%
Waseca		18,968	16,538	87.19%	336	1.77%	114	0.60%	111	0.59%	12	0.06%	21	0.11%	565	2.98%	1,271	6.70%
Washington		267,568	208,277	77.84%	13,799	5.16%	999	0.37%	18,530	6.93%	72	0.03%	969	0.36%	11,828	4.42%	13,094	4.89%
Watonwan		11,253	7,689	68.33%	42	0.37%	13	0.12%	86	0.76%	0	0.00%	15	0.13%	181	1.61%	3,227	28.68%
Wilkin		6,506	5,918	90.96%	41	0.63%	87	1.34%	8	0.12%	1	0.02%	5	0.08%	235	3.61%	211	3.24%
Winona		49,671	44,178	88.94%	892	1.80%	84	0.17%	933	1.88%	0	0.00%	124	0.25%	1,571	3.16%	1,889	3.80%
Wright		141,337	126,031	89.17%	2,605	1.84%	331	0.23%	1,877	1.33%	35	0.02%	508	0.36%	5,253	3.72%	4,697	3.32%
Yellow Medicine		9,528	8,408	88.25%	48	0.50%	276	2.90%	28	0.29%	1	0.01%	4	0.04%	315	3.31%	448	4.70%

== Historical counties ==
The new Seal of Minnesota contains 98 gold "boxes" around the edge, symbolizing the state's 87 counties and 11 recognized Native American tribes.

=== Before statehood ===
- St. Clair County, Indiana Territory (1801–1812) (Transferred to Illinois in 1809)
- St. Charles County, Louisiana Territory (1809–1813) (Transferred to Missouri Territory in 1812)
- Madison County, Illinois Territory (1812–1818) Formed from St. Clair County
- Michilimackinac County, Michigan Territory (1818–1837)
- Crawford County, Michigan Territory (1818–1840) (Transferred to Wisconsin Territory in 1837)
- Chippewa County, Michigan Territory (1827–1837)
- Dubuque County, Michigan Territory (1834–1837)
- Fayette County, Wisconsin Territory (1837–1849)
- St. Croix County, Wisconsin Territory (1840–1849)
- La Pointe County, Wisconsin Territory (1845–1849) Formed from St. Croix
- Mahkatah County (1849–1851) (Mahkahto) (One of Original 9 counties) Dissolved to Pembina and Cass
- Wahnata County (1849–1851) (One of Original 9 counties) Dissolved to Pembina and Cass
- Superior County (February 20, 1855 to March 3, 1855) Name changed to Saint Louis, then to Lake
- Newton County (1855–1856) Formed from Itasca County and Un-organized. Name Changed from Doty County, then to Saint Louis County.
- Saint Louis County (1855-1856) Name changed from Superior, then to Lake. Saint Louis name given to former Newton County

=== After statehood ===
- Buchanan County (1857–1861) Formed from Pine County, dissolved back to Pine
- Pierce County (1853–1862) Formed from Dakota County
- Davis County (1855–1862) Formed from Cass, Nicollet, and Sibley Counties
- Toombs County (1858–1862) Formed from Pembina, name changed to Andy Johnson
- Monroe County (1858-1860) Merged with Mille Lacs
- Lincoln County (1861–1868) Formed from Renville County
- Manomin County (1857–1869) Formed from Ramsey County, Merged into Anoka County.
- Monongalia County (1861–1870) Formed from Ramsey, Pierce, and un-organized counties. Dissolved to Kandiyohi County.
- Aiken County (1857–1872) Formed from Pine and Ramsey counties, name changed to Aitkin
- Pembina County (1849–1878) (One of Original 9 counties) Name changed to Kittson
- Breckenridge County (1858–1862) Formed from Pembina, name changed to Clay
- Andy Johnson County (1862–1868) Formerly Toombs, name changed to Wilkin
- Midway County (1857–1858) Area created from Brown county, overlapped Pipestone county. Dissolved in 1858 when the State of Minnesota was formed and the rest of the territory not added to the state became unorganized.
