= Martell, Wisconsin =

- Town
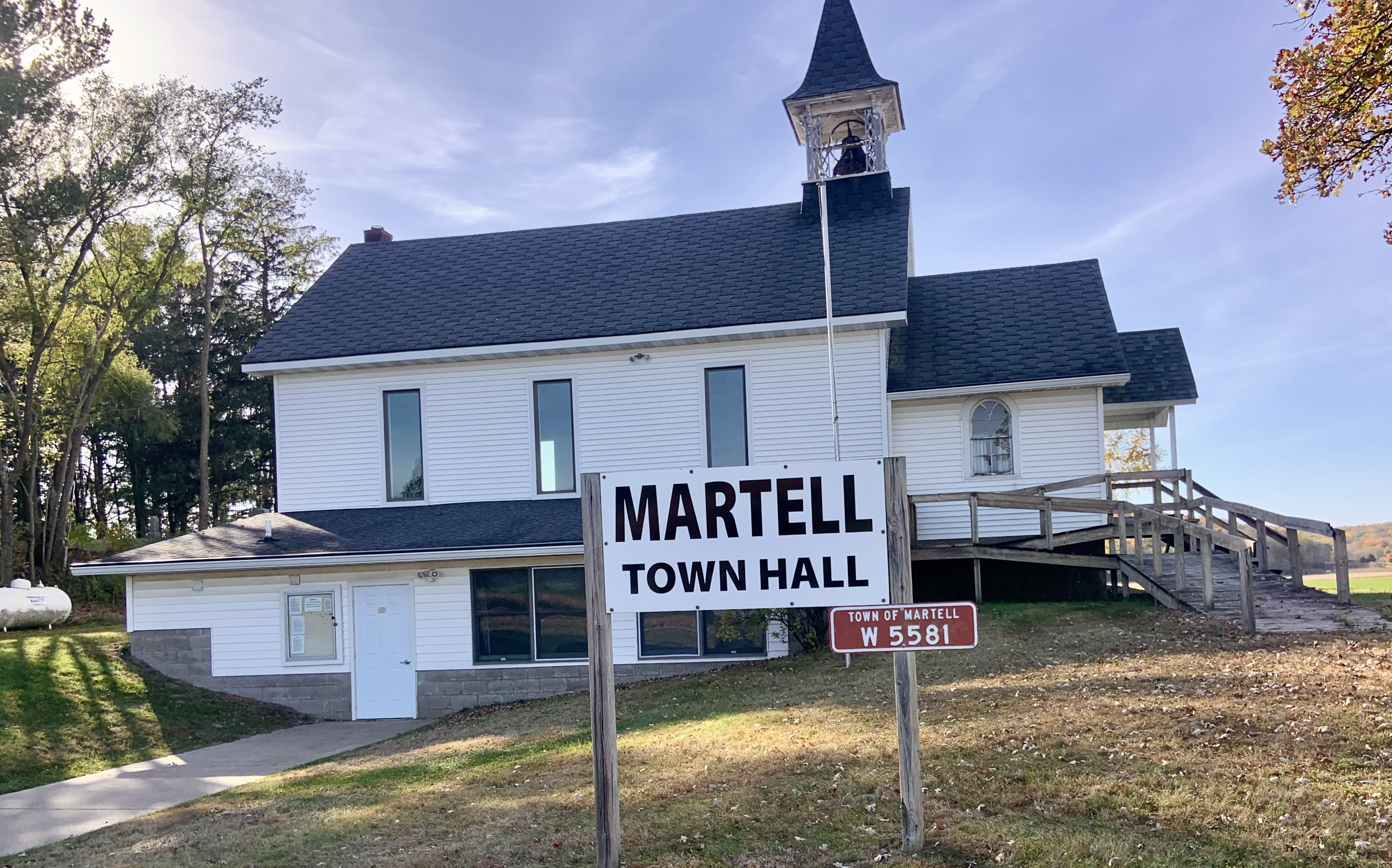
- Town hall

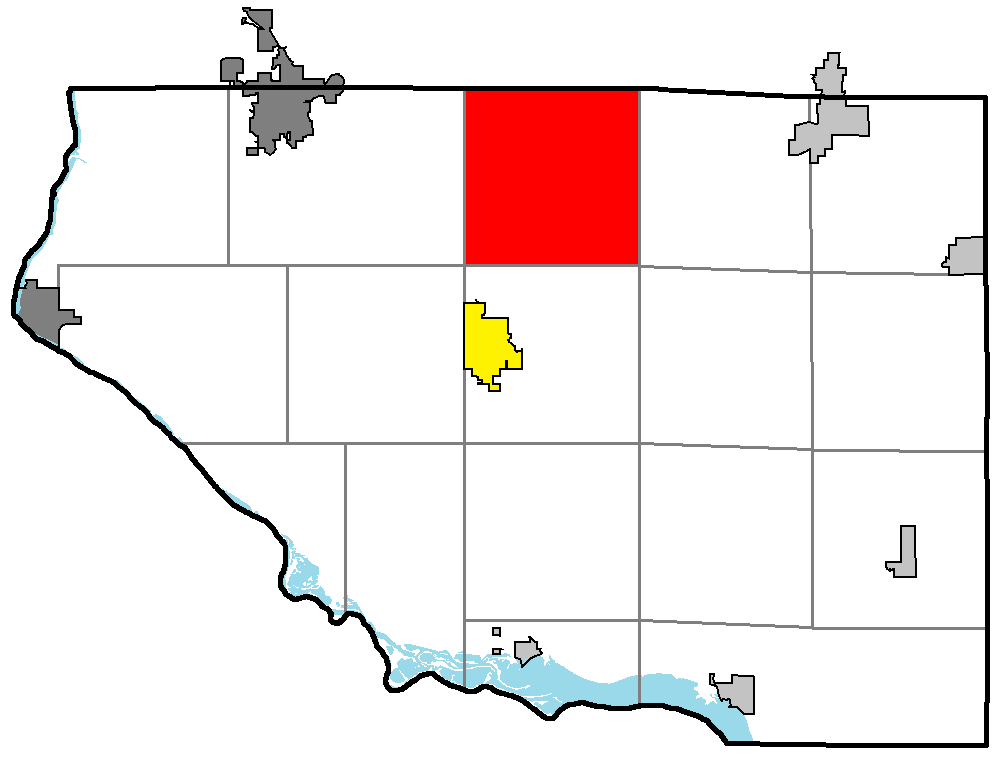
- Location of Martell, within Pierce County

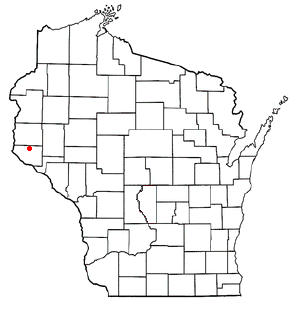
- Location of Martell, Wisconsin
- Coordinates: 44°49′14″N 92°25′24″W
- Country: United States
- State: Wisconsin
- County: Pierce

Area
  - Total: 35.8 sq mi (92.8 km^{2})
  - Land: 35.8 sq mi (92.8 km^{2})
  - Water: 0 sq mi (0.0 km^{2})
- Elevation: 1,070 ft (326 m)

Population (2020)
  - Total: 1,147
  - Density: 32.0/sq mi (12.4/km^{2})
- Time zone: UTC-6 (Central (CST))
  - Summer (DST): UTC-5 (CDT)
- Area codes: 715 & 534
- FIPS code: 55-49775
- GNIS feature ID: 1583668
- Website: https://www.townofmartell.com/

Martell /mɑːrˈtɛl/ mar-TEL) is a town in Pierce County, Wisconsin, United States. The population was 1,147 at the 2020 census.

== Communities ==
- Lawton is located at the intersection of US 63 and County Road N; the southern half of the community is in the town of Ellsworth.
- Martell is located on US 63 at the Rush River.
- Morton Corner is located at the intersection of County Road J and 690th Avenue.

== Transportation ==
The town is located where U.S. Route 63 crosses the Rush River.

== Geography ==
According to the United States Census Bureau, the town has a total area of 35.8 square miles (92.8 km^{2}), all land.

== Demographics ==
As of the census of 2000, there were 1,070 people, 382 households, and 297 families residing in the town. The population density was 29.9 inhabitants per square mile (11.5/km^{2}). There were 391 housing units at an average density of 10.9 per square mile (4.2/km^{2}). The racial makeup of the town was 99.16% White, 0.19% African American, 0.28% Asian, 0.09% from other races, and 0.28% from two or more races. Hispanic or Latino of any race were 0.28% of the population.

There were 382 households, out of which 39.3% had children under the age of 18 living with them, 69.1% were married couples living together, 4.2% had a female householder with no husband present, and 22.0% were non-families. 16.8% of all households were made up of individuals, and 5.5% had someone living alone who was 65 years of age or older. The average household size was 2.80 and the average family size was 3.17.

In the town, the population was spread out, with 27.7% under the age of 18, 6.8% from 18 to 24, 36.0% from 25 to 44, 22.3% from 45 to 64, and 7.2% who were 65 years of age or older. The median age was 36 years. For every 100 females, there were 100.4 males. For every 100 females age 18 and over, there were 104.8 males.

The median income for a household in the town was $54,539, and the median income for a family was $57,063. Males had a median income of $40,240 versus $26,324 for females. The per capita income for the town was $21,304. About 4.6% of families and 5.5% of the population were below the poverty line, including 7.2% of those under age 18 and 12.5% of those age 65 or over.

== Notable people ==
- LaRoy Baird, North Dakota lawyer and politician, was born in Martell
- Randolph Edgar Haugan, Norwegian-American writer; was born in Martell
- William A. Kay, farmer and Wisconsin State Representative, was born in Martell
