= Rush River (Wisconsin) =

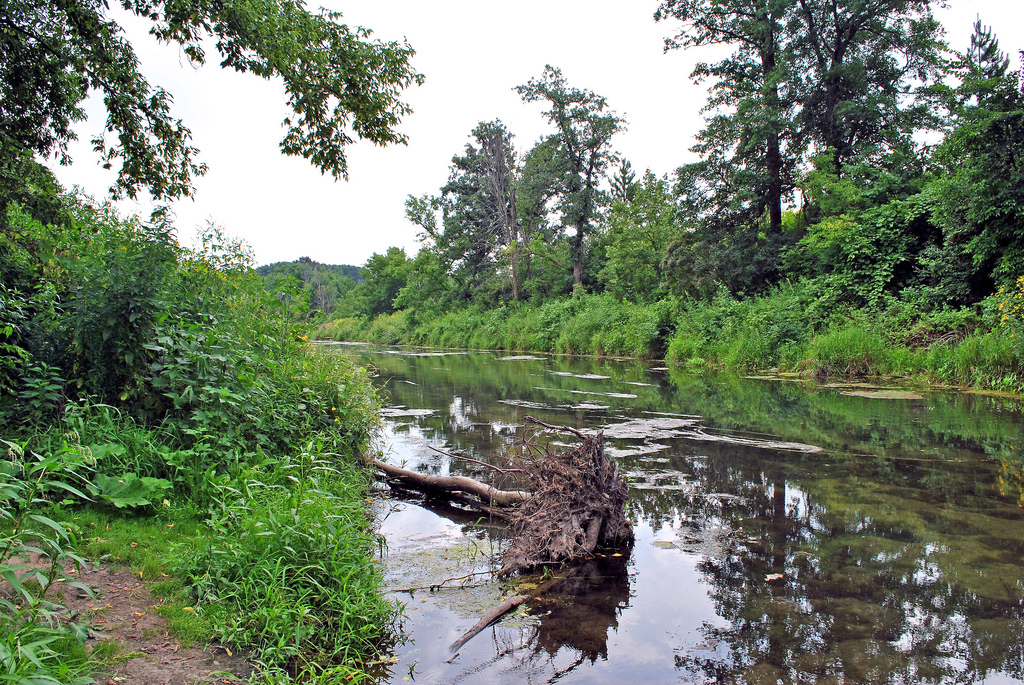
- Rush River below WI 29 South

- Mouth of the Rush River

Location
- Country: United States
- State: Wisconsin
- County: Pierce County, St. Croix County

Physical characteristics
- Source
  - location: Emerald
  - coordinates: 45.0102426°N 92.3124119°W
- Mouth
  - location: Maiden Rock
  - coordinates: 44°33′29″N 92°19′51″W
- Length: 49.8 mi-long (80.1 km)

Basin features
- River system: Mississippi River

The Rush River is a 49.8-mile-long (80.1 km) tributary of the Mississippi River in western Wisconsin in the United States. It rises just north of Interstate 94 in St. Croix County near Baldwin and flows generally southwardly through Pierce County. It ends in Lake Pepin of the Mississippi River, about 1 mile (2 km) west of the village of Maiden Rock in Pierce County. The largest tributary is Lost Creek.

Three small communities are located on the river: Centerville, Martell, and El Paso. While the land near the source is relatively flat, the river soon falls into a steep valley typical of the Driftless Area, with outcrops of sandstone and limestone.

The Rush River is locally known as an excellent trout stream. It does not hold as many trout as the nearby Kinnickinnic River, but they are larger in size. This is because it is more of a free-stone stream than the upper Kinnickinnic, with slightly warmer water, which produces larger food sources for the trout. The warmer water of some stretches also affects the fish species found in the river. Immediately upstream from the bridge on the south side of Martell, it is predominantly trout. Immediately south of the bridge, it is predominantly suckers. The last few miles of the stream holds an increasing proportion of medium-temperature riverine species, such as smallmouth bass.

The delta of the Rush River is a State Natural Area, designated in 1986. The heavily wooded floodplain provides an ideal location for waterfowl.

== See also ==
- List of Wisconsin rivers
