= LaRoy Baird =

American lawyer, military officer, and politician

LaRoy Baird (February 27, 1881 – March 5, 1950) was an American lawyer, military officer, and politician.

Born in the town of Martell, Pierce County, Wisconsin, Baird received his bachelor's and law degrees from the University of Minnesota. He moved to Dickinson, North Dakota and practiced law. He served in the North Dakota National Guard and was involved with the Mexican Border Campaign and with World War I; he was commissioned brigadier general. From 1921 to 1927, Baird served in the North Dakota Senate. He then served as North Dakota receiver of closed banks from 1927 to 1947. From 1941 to the end of World War II, he had also served as Chairman for the North Dakota Defense Council. Baird died of heart problems in Dickinson, North Dakota.
