= Martell (community), Wisconsin =

Martell, Wisconsin
- Unincorporated community
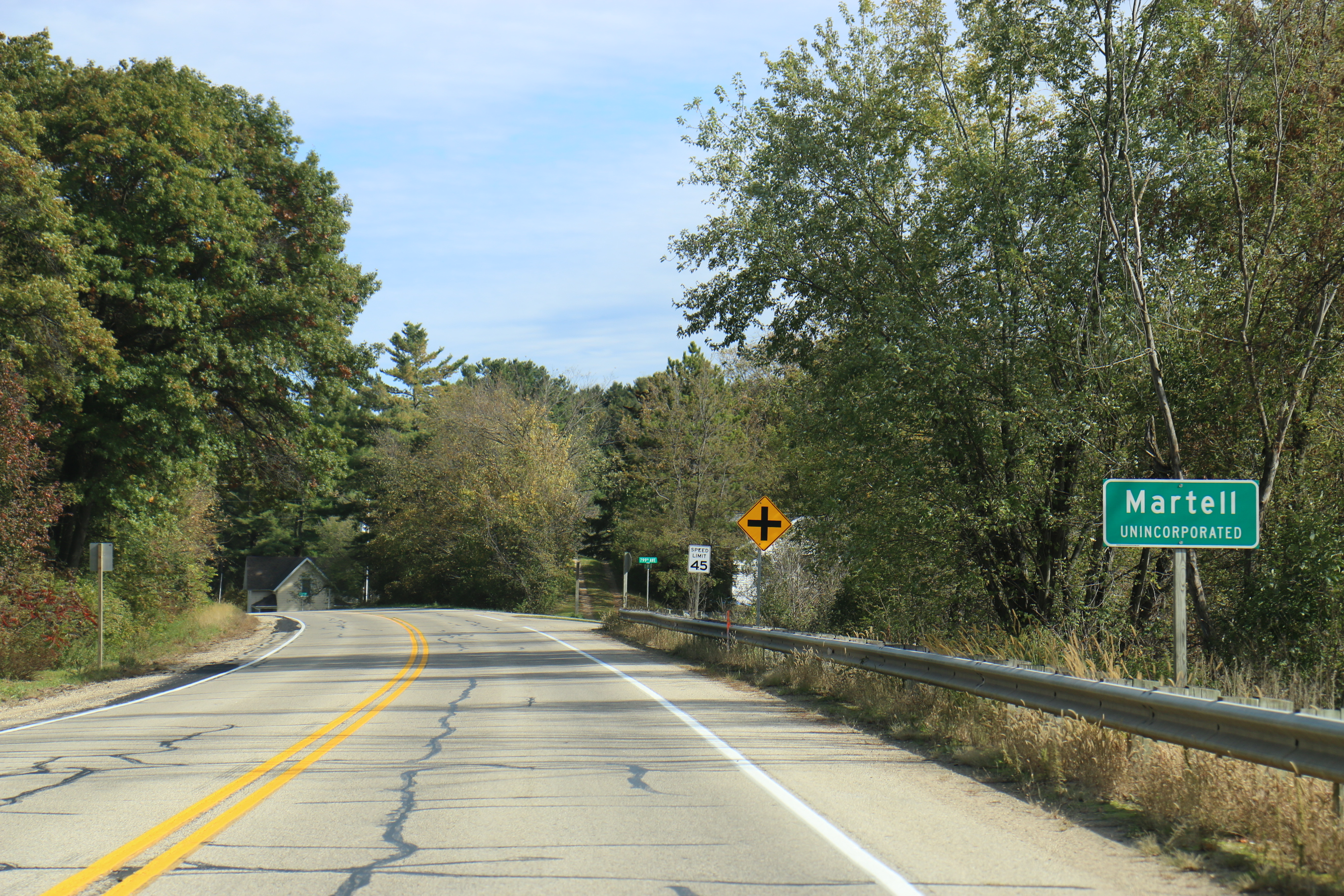
- Sign for Martell

- Location within Wisconsin Location within the United States
- Coordinates: 44°49′47″N 92°23′52″W
- Country: United States
- State: Wisconsin
- County: Pierce
- Elevation: 1,017 ft (310 m)
- Time zone: UTC-6 (Central (CST))
  - Summer (DST): UTC-5 (CDT)
- Area codes: 715 & 534
- GNIS feature ID: 1569089

Martell /mɑːrˈtɛl/ mar-TEL) is an unincorporated community located in the town of Martell, Pierce County, Wisconsin, United States.

== Images ==
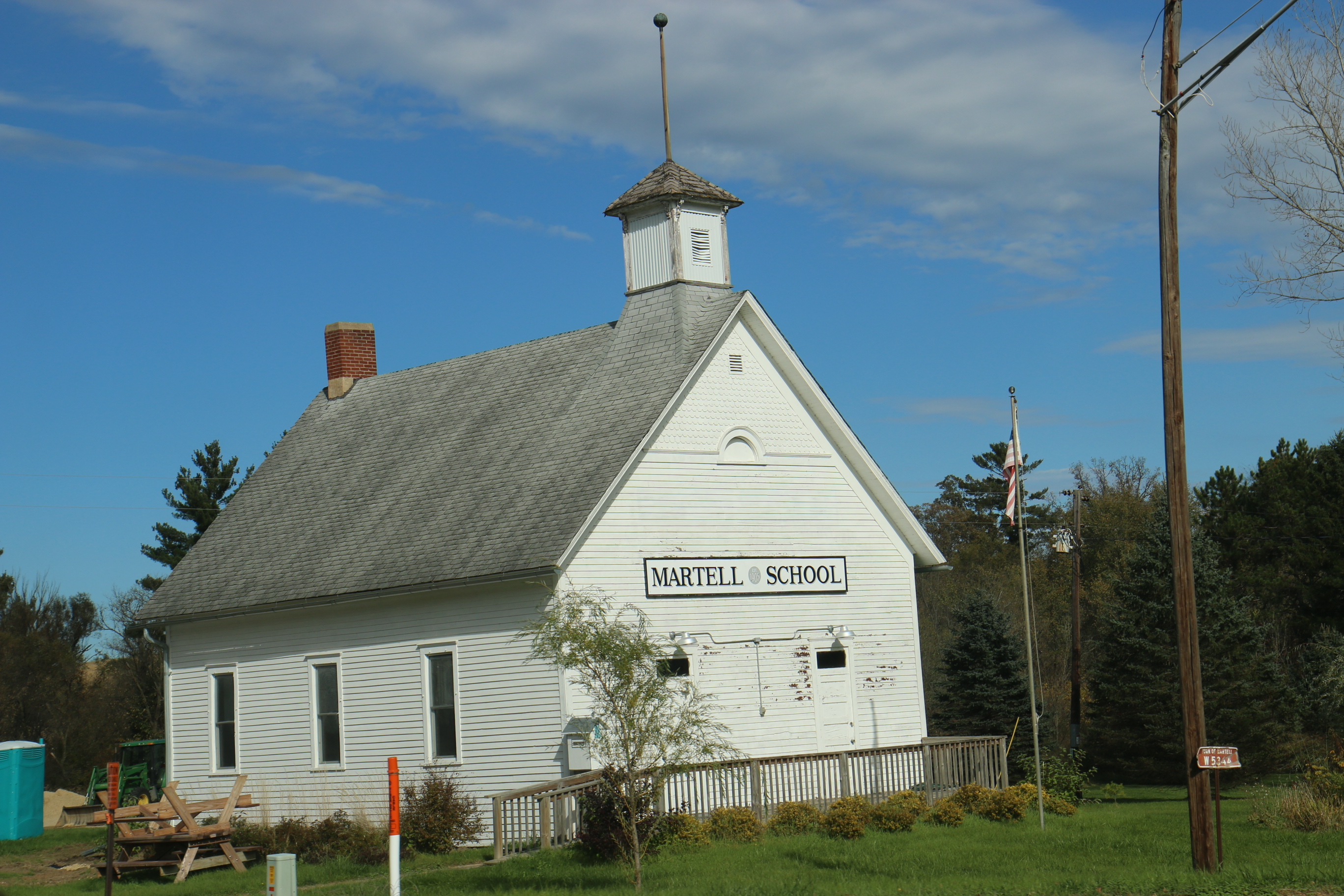
School in Martell

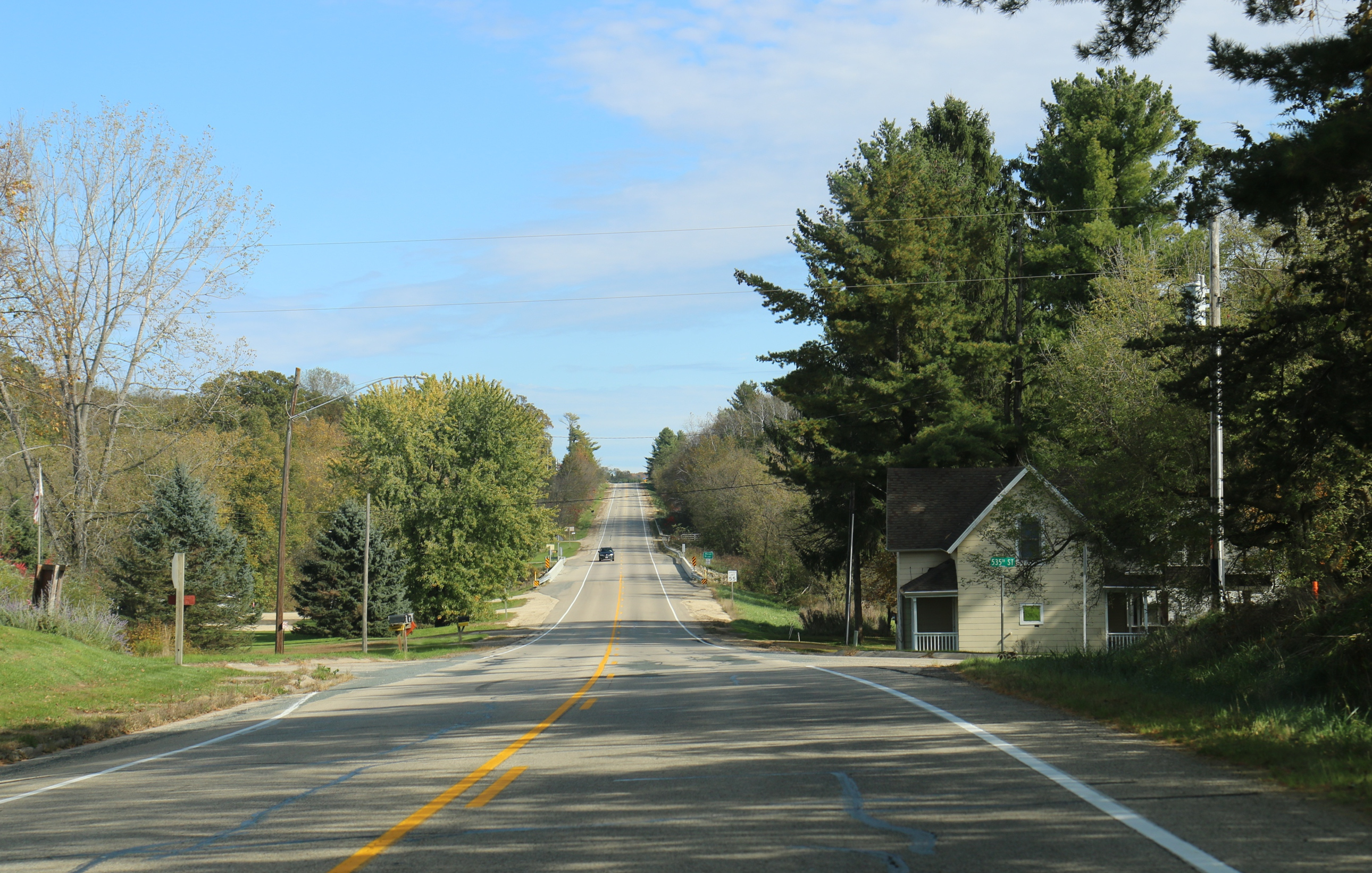
Photograph in Martell
