= Lawton, Wisconsin =

- Unincorporated community
- Location within Wisconsin Location within the United States
- Coordinates: 44°46′33″N 92°24′57″W
- Country: United States
- State: Wisconsin
- County: Pierce
- Elevation: 1,093 ft (333 m)
- Time zone: UTC-6 (Central (CST))
  - Summer (DST): UTC-5 (CDT)
- Area codes: 715 & 534
- GNIS feature ID: 1577692

Lawton is an unincorporated community located in the towns of Ellsworth and Martell, Pierce County, Wisconsin, United States. Lawton is located at the junction of U.S. Route 63 and County Highway N, 4.5 miles (7.2 km) northeast of the city of Ellsworth. The community is most likely named for Lawton Peterson, who ran the store in which the first post office was located when it opened in 1894.
