= Randolph Edgar Haugan =

American writer

Randolph E. Haugan (July 31, 1902 – February 18, 1985) was an American writer, editor, and publisher.

== Background ==
Randolph Edgar Haugan was born in Martell, Pierce County, Wisconsin to immigrant parents from Norway. He was the youngest child of Torgeir Halvorson Haugan (1864–1915) and Hilda Dorothea Josephine (Ehrhardt) Haugan. His father was a Lutheran minister from Haugan near Brunkeberg in the Kviteseid Municipality of Telemark County, Norway, who had immigrated to the United States in 1883. Haugan was a graduate of St. Olaf College (B. A. 1924).

== Career ==
From 1928 to 1970, Haugan held the position of general manager for Augsburg Publishing House. He was author and editor of Lutheran church publications, including summaries of the beliefs and practices and information relating to the Evangelical Lutheran Church in America.

Haugan was knighted by King Haakon VII of Norway during World War II for his service to American Relief for Norway, Inc. for which he was Minnesota state director. Haugan was also a charter member of the Ampersander Society of Minneapolis and a contributing member of the Norwegian-American Historical Association. He served as chairman of the St. Olaf College Board of Trustees.

Haugan is most frequently associated with Christmas: An American Annual of Christmas Literature and Art, a series he initiated in 1931 and edited throughout the remainder of his career. This English language edition succeeded Jul i Vesterheimen, a Norwegian language Christmas annual previously published by Augsburg Publishing.

== Selected works ==
- The 1924-25 Viking Yearbook (Fiftieth Anniversary). (Northfield, Minnesota: St. Olaf College, 1925.
- My Christian Faith. Minneapolis: Augsburg Publishing, 1937.
- Forward March of Faith: The Story of A Church. Minneapolis: Augsburg Publishing, 1943.
