= Ellsworth (town), Wisconsin =

Town in Pierce County, Wisconsin

Ellsworth, Wisconsin
- Town
- Town of Ellsworth
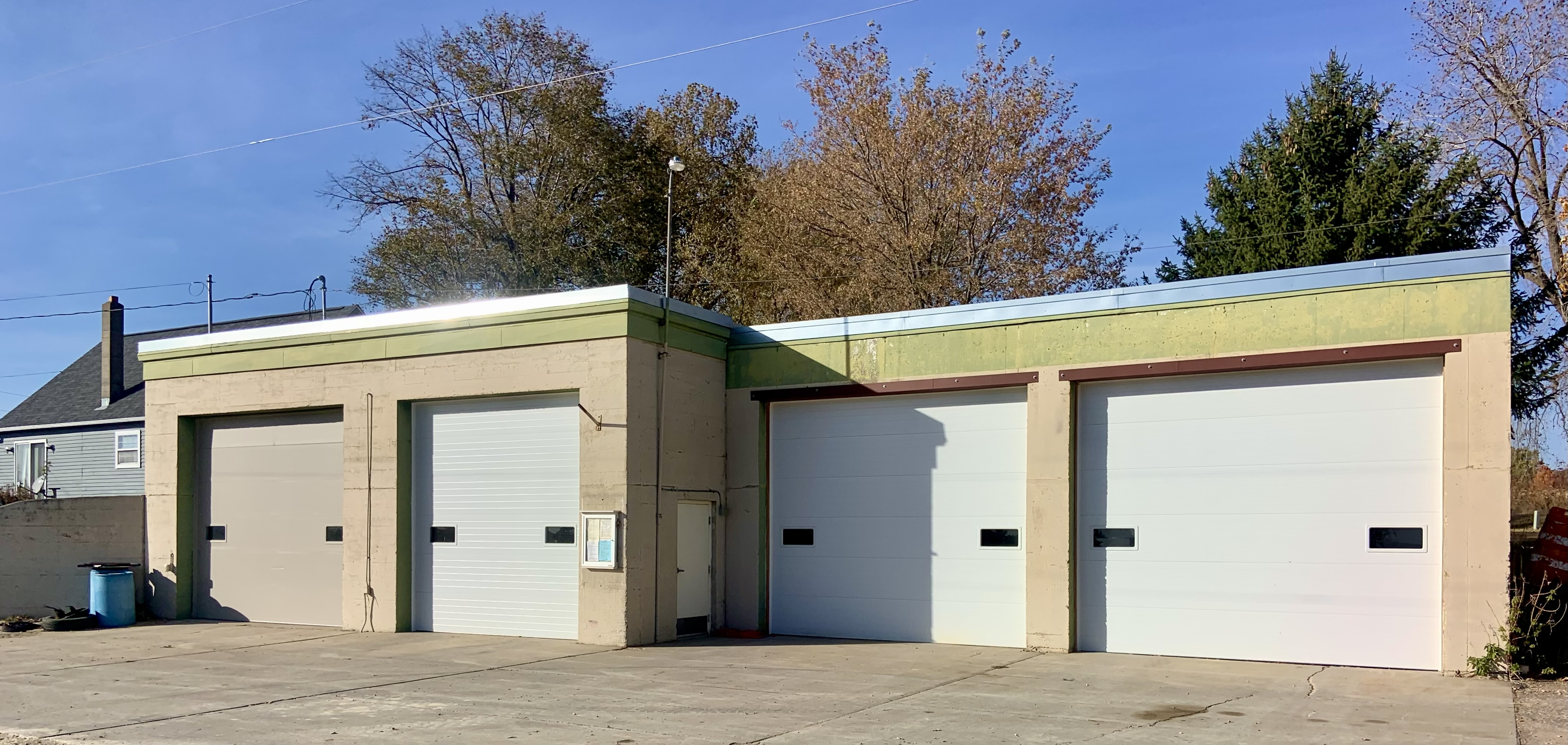
- Ellsworth Town Hall

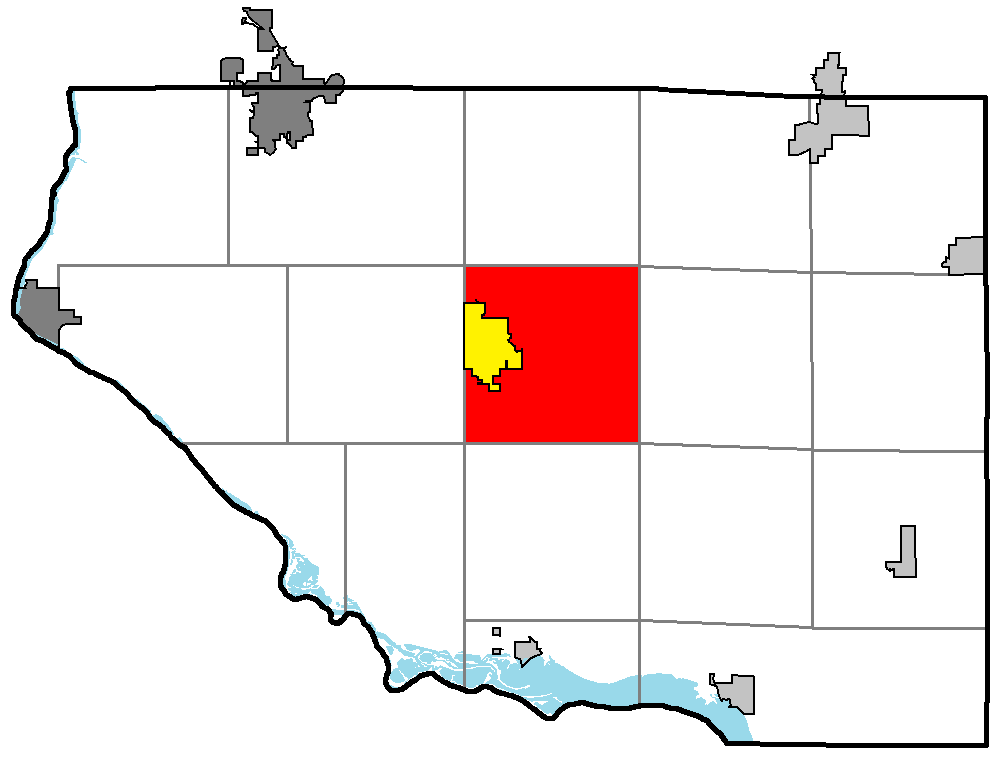
- Location of Ellsworth, within Pierce County

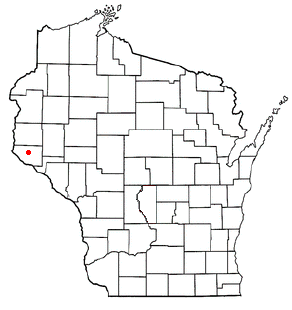
- Coordinates: 44°43′31″N 92°25′35″W
- Country: United States
- State: Wisconsin
- County: Pierce

Area
  - Total: 32.07 sq mi (83.1 km^{2})
  - Land: 32.05 sq mi (83.0 km^{2})
  - Water: 0.02 sq mi (0.052 km^{2})

Population (2020)
  - Total: 1,121
  - Density: 34.98/sq mi (13.50/km^{2})
- Time zone: UTC-6 (Central (CST))
  - Summer (DST): UTC-5 (CDT)
- Area code(s): 715 and 534
- GNIS feature ID: 1583156

Ellsworth is a town in Pierce County, Wisconsin, United States. The population was 1,121 at the 2020 census. The Village of Ellsworth is located within the town. The unincorporated community of Lawton is also located partially in the town.

== Geography ==
According to the United States Census Bureau, the town has a total area of 32.1 square miles (83.1 km^{2}), of which 32.1 square miles (83.1 km^{2}) is land and 0.03% is water.

== Demographics ==
As of the census of 2000, there were 1,064 people, 380 households, and 289 families residing in the town. The population density was 33.2 inhabitants per square mile (12.8/km^{2}). There were 391 housing units at an average density of 12.2 per square mile (4.7/km^{2}). The racial makeup of the town was 98.78% White, 0.09% Black or African American, 0.66% Native American, 0.38% Asian, 0.09% from other races. 0.28% of the population were Hispanic or Latino of any race.

There were 380 households, out of which 39.2% had children under the age of 18 living with them, 67.9% were married couples living together, 5.0% had a female householder with no husband present, and 23.9% were non-families. 17.6% of all households were made up of individuals, and 8.4% had someone living alone who was 65 years of age or older. The average household size was 2.80 and the average family size was 3.20.

In the town, the population was spread out, with 28.5% under the age of 18, 7.6% from 18 to 24, 30.6% from 25 to 44, 24.3% from 45 to 64, and 8.9% who were 65 years of age or older. The median age was 36 years. For every 100 females, there were 105.0 males. For every 100 females age 18 and over, there were 110.2 males.

The median income for a household in the town was $52,188, and the median income for a family was $57,500. Males had a median income of $36,141 versus $24,957 for females. The per capita income for the town was $20,363. About 2.5% of families and 3.5% of the population were below the poverty line, including 2.8% of those under age 18 and 5.3% of those age 65 or over.
