= Davis County, Minnesota =

Coordinates: 45°9′N 96°1′W

Davis County was a county in Minnesota, created in 1855 from Cass, Nicollet, Pierce and Sibley counties. In 1862 the county was disbanded and what was left was merged into Chippewa and Lac qui Parle Counties. Davis County was attached to Stearns and Lac qui Parle Counties for county and/or judicial purposes.
