= Historic Lincoln County, Minnesota =

Historic Lincoln County was a proposed county located in the state of Minnesota. It was to have consisted of the north-eastern area of Renville County and to include the two southernmost townships of Meeker County. The new county was approved by the Minnesota legislature in 1861 but was not ratified by the residents of either existing county. The proposal for the new county was abandoned in 1868.

Contemporary Lincoln County, located on the Minnesota-South Dakota, border was established on established March 6, 1873.
