= Pierce County, Minnesota =

Former county of Minnesota Territory, United States

Pierce County was a county in Minnesota, created on March 5, 1853, from Dakota County. It was originally bounded by the Minnesota River to the west and the south, Nicollet County to the east, north fork of the Crow River to the north, and Pembina County in the northwest. It was fully dissolved and incorporated into Big Sioux, Davis and Renville Counties in 1855.
