= Fred and Lucia Farnham House =

Historic house in Wisconsin, United States

- U.S. National Register of Historic Places
- Wisconsin Register of Historic Places
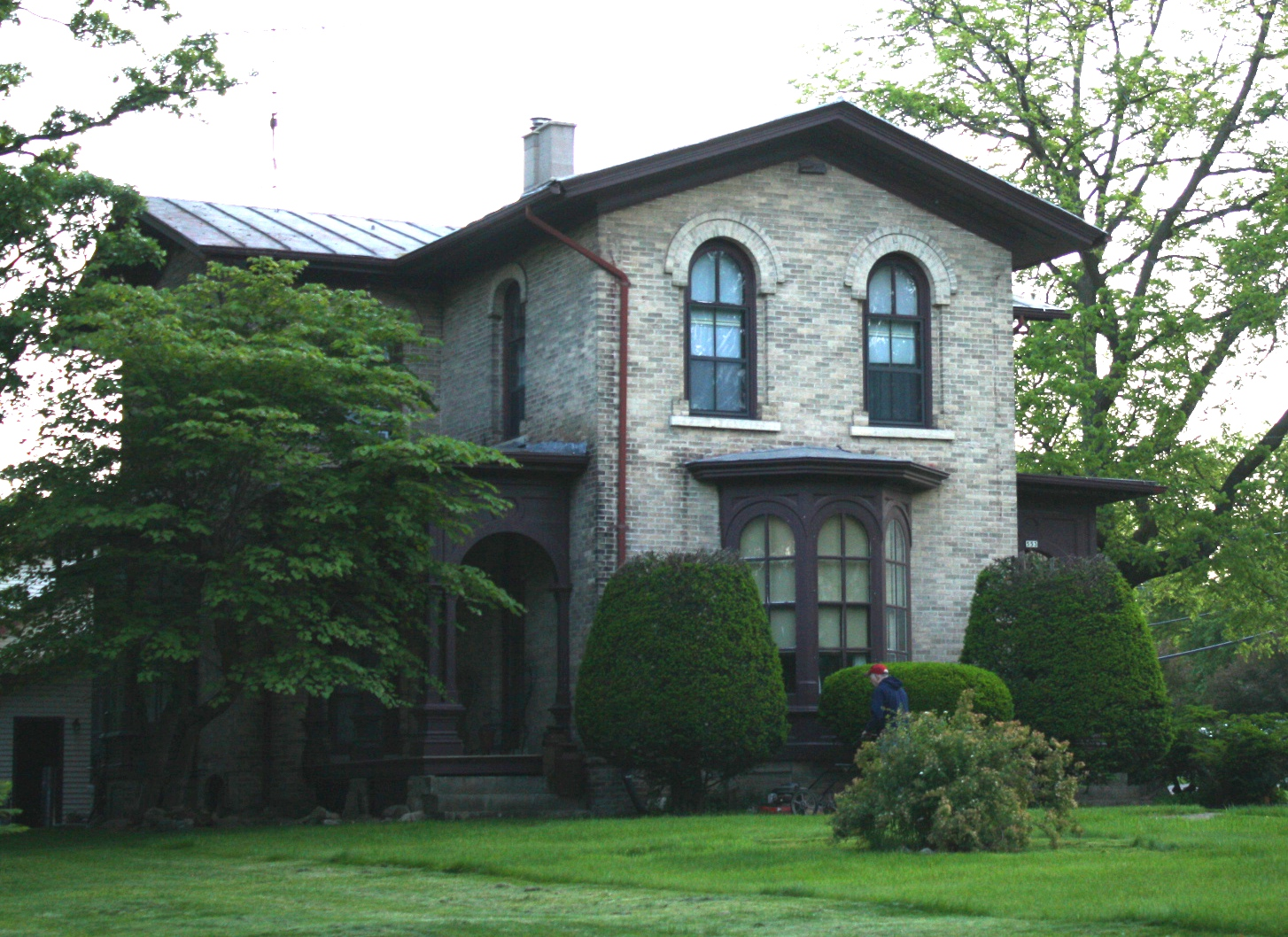
- Front view

- Location within Wisconsin Location within the United States
- Location: 553 West James Street, Columbus, Wisconsin 53925
- Coordinates: 43°20′29″N 89°01′12″W
- Area: < 1 acre (0.40 ha)
- Built: 1867; 159 years ago
- Built by: Richard D. Vanaken
- Architect: Richard D. Vanaken
- Architectural style: Italianate
- NRHP reference No.: 09000580
- SRHP No.: 3481

Significant dates
- Added to NRHP: July 30, 2009
- Designated SRHP: April 17, 2009

The Fred and Lucia Farnham House is a historical house in Columbus, Wisconsin. The Italianate style home was designed, and constructed in 1867, by Columbus architect and carpentry contractor Richard D. Vanaken.

It was initially inhabited by Fred and Lucia Farnham. Fred Farnham (c. 1821—1871), who was born Frederich F. Farnham in Vermont, was raised in Canada, and the state of New York. At the age of 25-years-old, c. 1846—1847, he moved from the latter location to Columbus, where he joined his three sisters. Farnham became a prosperous merchant in the city. He married Lucia Marsh of New York, in 1850. Farnham and James Allen, Lucia's brother-in-law, then became business partners and ran a highly successful produce and wholesale store. The profits from the store allowed Fred Farnham to build his new house at a corner lot on West James Street, a significant street in Columbus. The two-story house has a cruciform plan main block, with a small kitchen wing in the back, similar to other Italianate houses in Columbus.

== Historic listings ==
The house was added to Wisconsin's State Register of Historic Places on April 17, 2009, and the United States National Register of Historic Places on July 30, 2009.

The Fred and Lucia Farnham House's architect and builder, Richard D. Vanaken, in collaboration with architect Edward Townsend Mix, also designed Columbus' High Victorian Gothic and Italianate style Zion Evangelical Lutheran Church and Parsonage, first built in 1878. This site was listed in the National Register of Historic Places, in the year 2009, as well. These two site listings are among 15 other historical sites located in the city of Columbus which are listed in the state and federal registers (as of May 4, 2010).

Additionally, Fred Farnham initiated the construction of an Italianate style building on 111 East James Street, for his and his brother-in-law's produce business usage, c. 1858. This building, first known as the Farnham Block, and later the Schaeffer Block, was placed in both the state and federal registers in 1992, as a contributing property to the Columbus Downtown Historic District's listing.

== Gallery ==
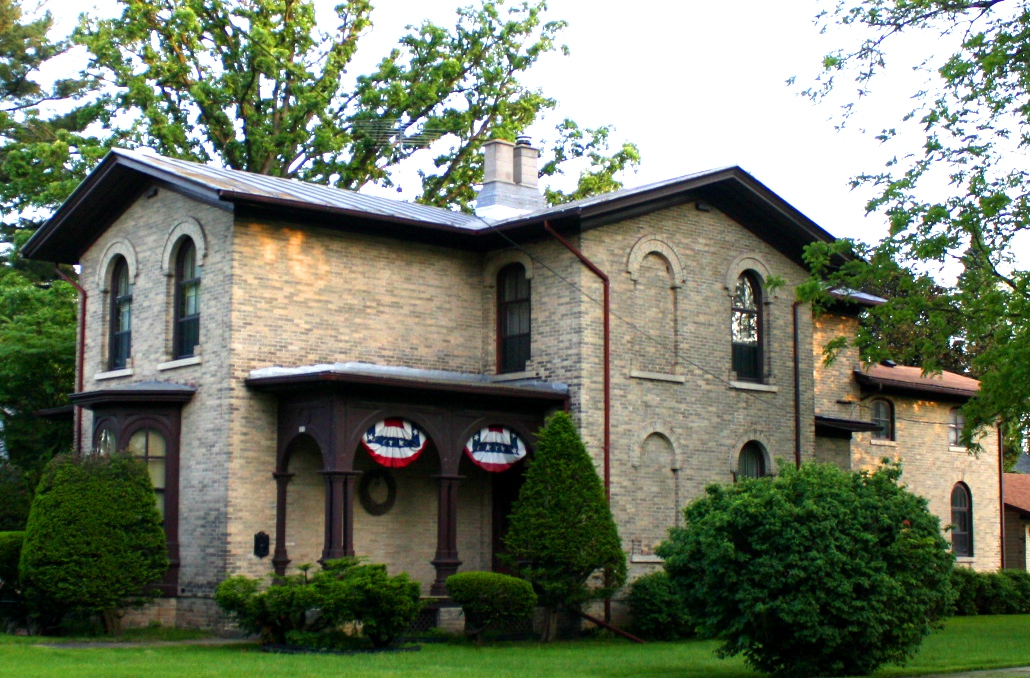
A side view perspective illustrates the house's cruciform shape.
