= Frances Kurth Sharrow House =

Historic house in Wisconsin, United States

- U.S. National Register of Historic Places
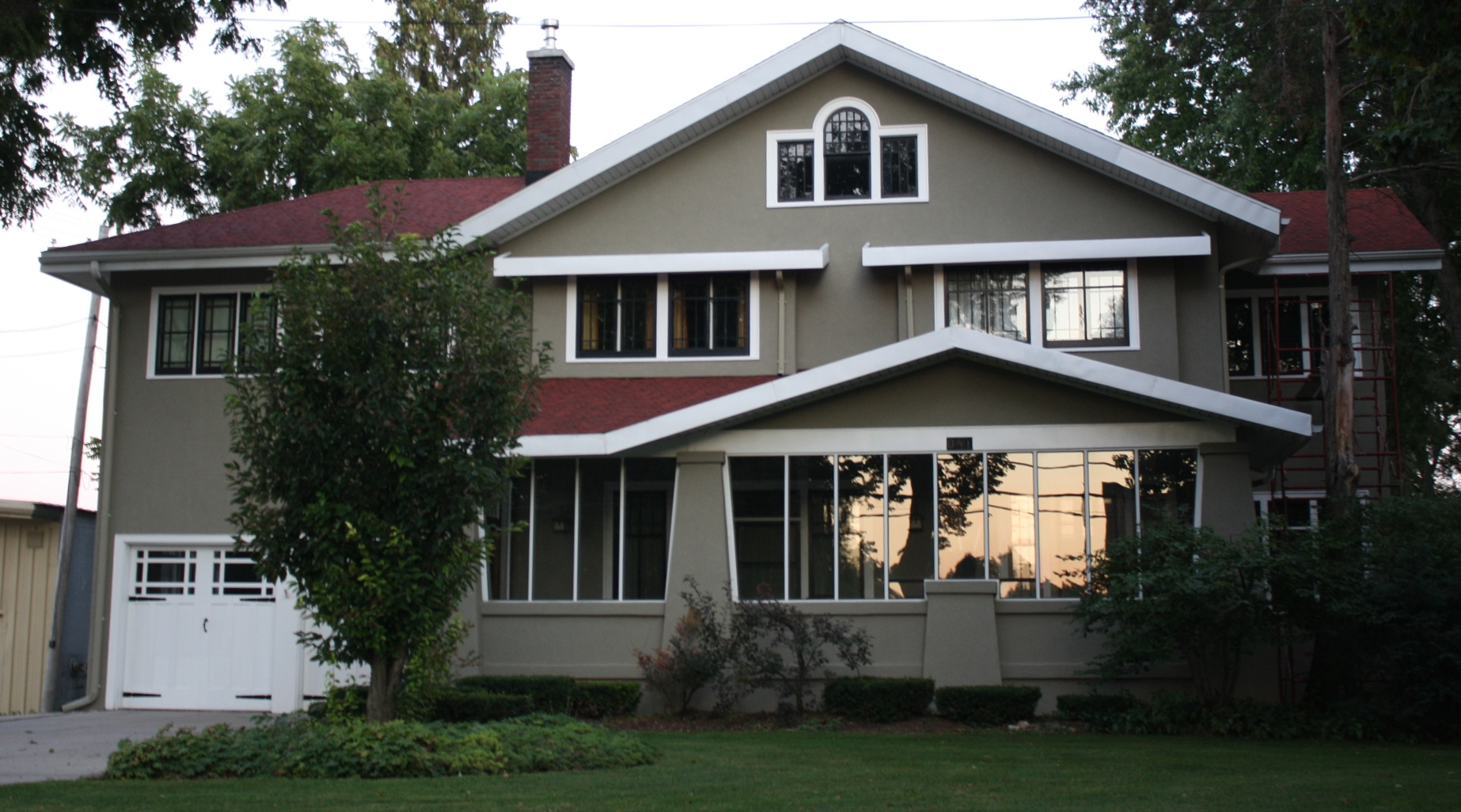

- Location within Wisconsin Location within the United States
- Location: 841 Park Avenue, Columbus, Wisconsin
- Coordinates: 43°19′57″N 89°01′19″W
- Area: less than one acre
- Built: 1917
- Built by: Alfred Ibisch
- Architect: Walter J. Keith
- Architectural style: Prairie School
- NRHP reference No.: 10000436
- Added to NRHP: May 24, 2010

The Frances Kurth Sharrow House is a historic house located at 841 Park Avenue in Columbus, Wisconsin. It was added to the National Register of Historic Places on May 24, 2010.

== History ==
The house was commissioned in 1916 by John Henry Kurth, son of the founder of Kurth Brewery. It was a wedding gift for his daughter, Frances, who soon after married Lloyd C. Sharrow, who later became Mayor of Columbus. The Sharrows would live there for the rest of their lives.
