= George Griswold (disambiguation) =

George Griswold (1794–1857) was an American politician.

George Griswold may also refer to:

- George Griswold, a store owner who built George Griswold House, in Columbus, Wisconsin, United States
- George Griswold, a fictional character in the 1949 film Alimony
