= William Jones (Wisconsin politician) =

Wisconsin politician

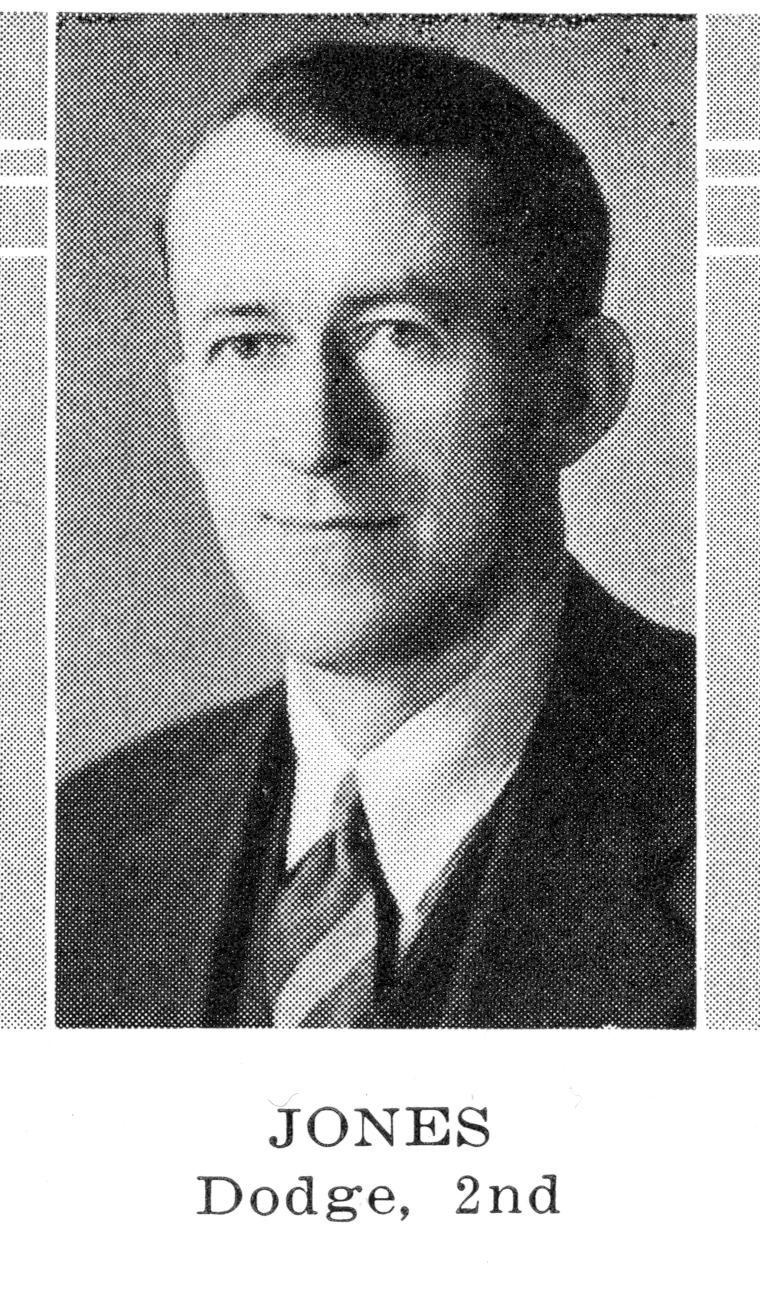
William E. Jones

William Everett Jones (November 8, 1894 – November 9, 1977) was a member of the Wisconsin State Assembly.

== Biography ==
Jones was born on November 8, 1894, in Calamus, Wisconsin. He attended Columbus Senior High School in Columbus, Wisconsin. During World War I, he served in the United States Army. He relocated to Columbus in 1970. Jones died in 1977 while en route to the hospital in Columbus, and he was buried in Columbus.

== Political career ==
Jones was a member of the Assembly from 1939 to 1942. In addition, he was chairman of the Town of Calamus. He was a Republican.
