= Albert M. and Alice Bellack House =

Historic house in Wisconsin, United States

- U.S. National Register of Historic Places
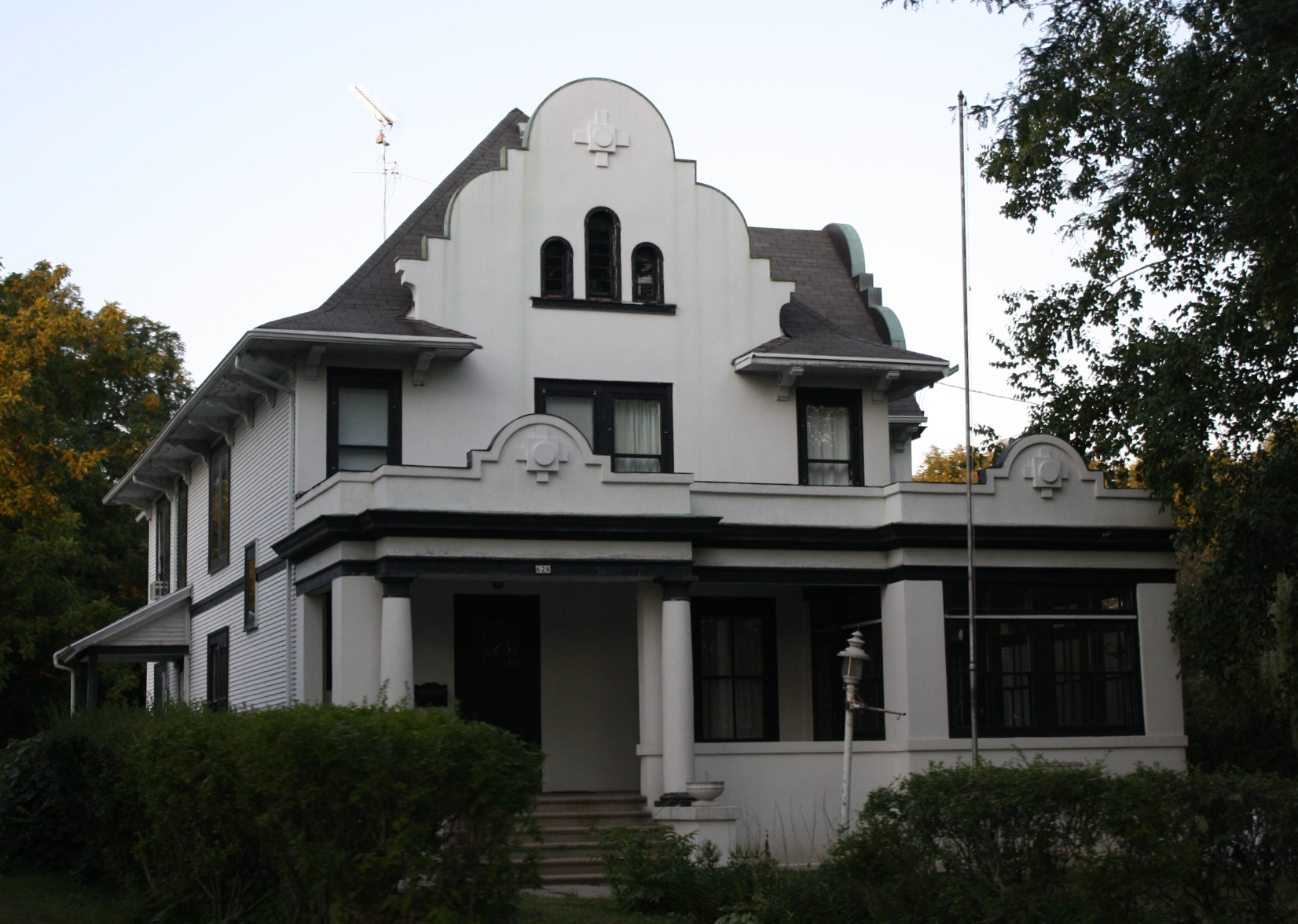

- Location within Wisconsin Location within the United States
- Location: 628 W. James St. Columbus, Wisconsin
- Coordinates: 43°20′32″N 89°1′11″W
- Area: less than one acre
- Built: 1897
- Architectural style: Queen Anne/Mission
- NRHP reference No.: 10000318
- Added to NRHP: June 7, 2010

The Albert M. and Alice Bellack House is a historic house located in Columbus, Wisconsin. It was added to the National Register of Historic Places on June 7, 2010.

== Description and history ==
The 2 1/2-story house was designed in the Queen Anne style and built for Albert and Alice Bellack in 1897. From 1920 to 1923, the house underwent extensive renovations which expanded its size and introduced the Mission architecture style to it.
