= Holsten Family Farmstead =

- U.S. National Register of Historic Places
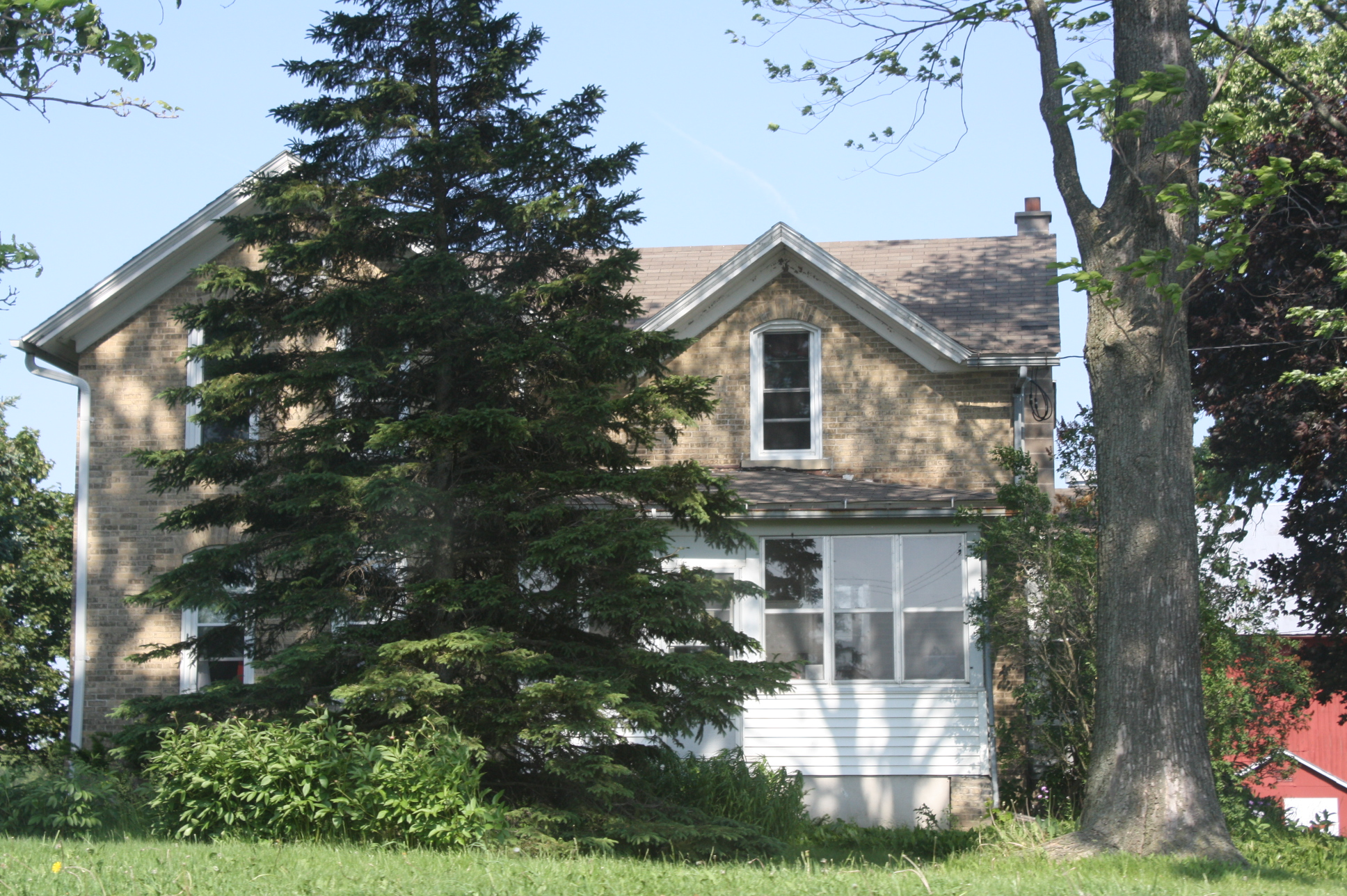
- Part of the Holsten Family Farmstead.
- Location: W1391 Weiner Rd., Columbus, Wisconsin
- Coordinates: 43°17′24″N 89°04′06″W
- Area: 2.8 acres (1.1 ha)
- Built: 1889
- Architectural style: Italianate
- NRHP reference No.: 92001189
- Added to NRHP: September 8, 1992

The Holsten Family Farmstead is located in Columbus, Wisconsin.

== Description ==
The farm includes an 1889 cream-brick Italianate farmhouse with Gothic details, an earlier Greek Revival home which has been converted to a granary, a barn with part built pre-1876, a corn crib, chicken coops, other sheds, orchard and gardens. The Holstens helped organize the Springbrook creamery and ice house in 1885, the Columbus Poultry Assoc. in the 1920s, and other community efforts. It was added to the State Register of Historic Places in 1991 and to the National Register of Historic Places the following year.
