= Adolphus and Sarah Ingalsbe House =

Historic house in Wisconsin, United States

- U.S. National Register of Historic Places
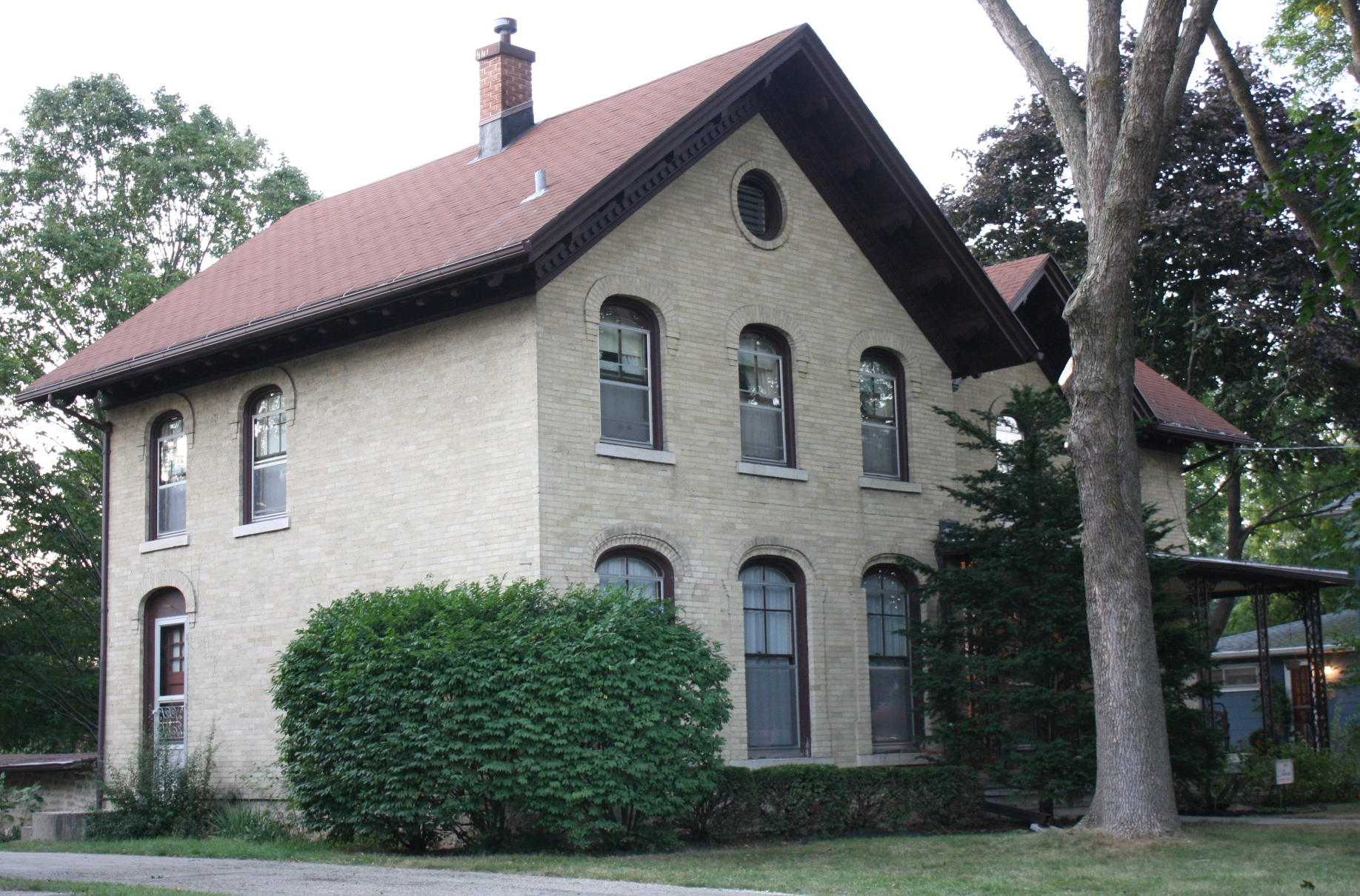

- Location within Wisconsin Location within the United States
- Location: 546 Park Ave., Columbus, Wisconsin
- Coordinates: 43°20′6″N 89°1′10″W
- Area: less than one acre
- Built: 1853
- Architects: Quickenden, Robert; Vanaken, Richard D.
- Architectural style: Italianate
- NRHP reference No.: 09000488
- Added to NRHP: July 1, 2009

The Adolphus and Sarah Ingalsbe House is located in Columbus, Wisconsin, United States. It was added to the National Register of Historic Places in 2009. Additionally, it is listed on the Wisconsin State Register of Historic Places.

== History ==
The house was built by Adolphus and Sarah Ingalsbe, originally from New York City who moved to Columbus after finding success during the California Gold Rush. In 1875, the house went underwent substantial renovations that increased its size.
