= Whitney Hotel =

- U.S. Historic district – Contributing property
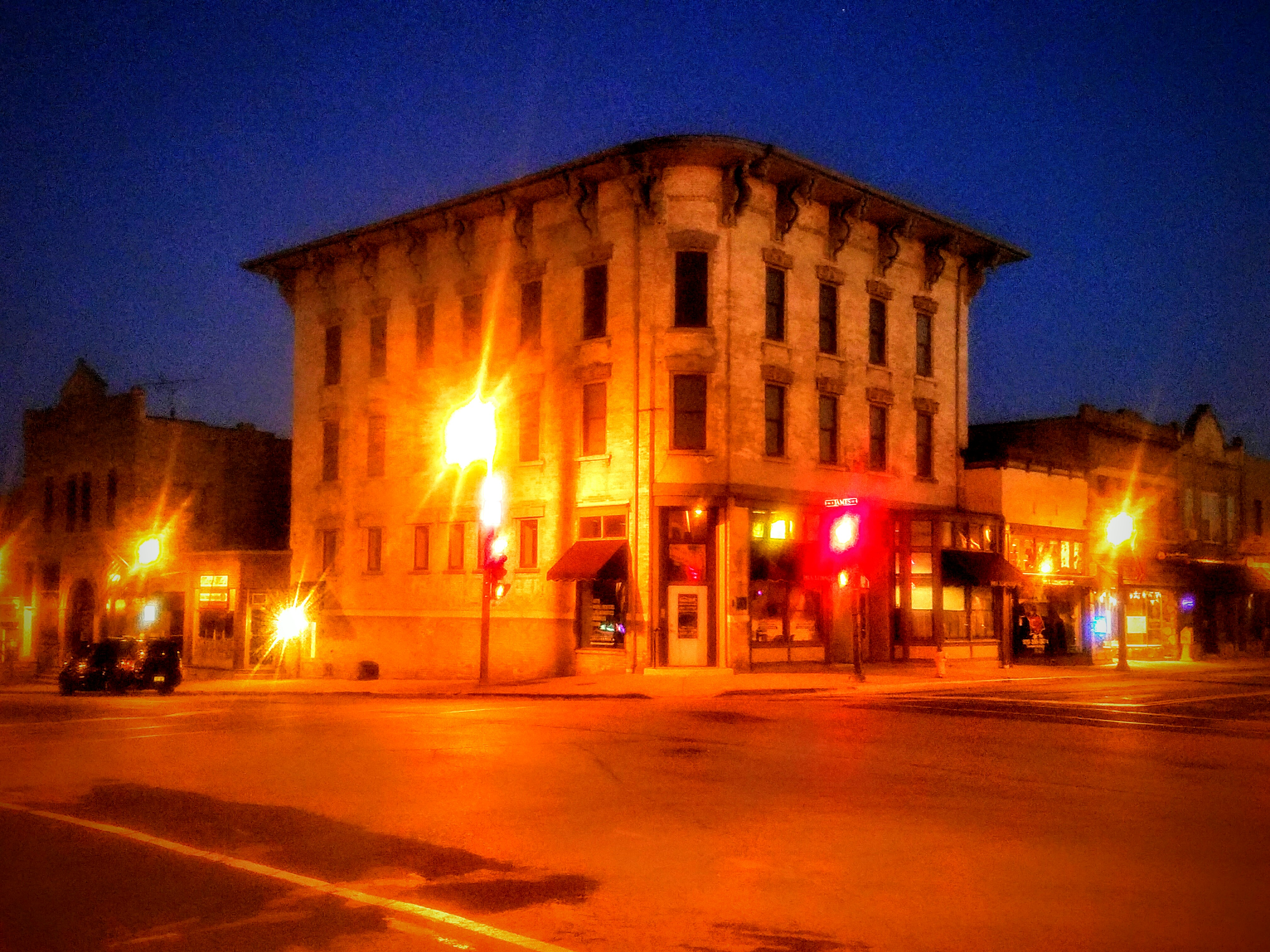
- Whitney Building at night

- Location within Wisconsin
- Location: 101-103 S Ludington and 100 East James Units 1-10; Columbus, Wisconsin
- Coordinates: 43.3383°N 89.0146°W
- Architectural style: Italianate
- Part of: Columbus Downtown Historic District (ID92000113)
- NRHP reference No.: 26716

Significant dates
- Added to NRHP: March 5, 1982
- Designated CP: March 15, 1992

The Whitney Hotel is located in Columbus, Wisconsin, United States. It is a contributing property of the Columbus Downtown Historic District which was listed on the National Register of Historic Places in 1992.

== History ==
H. A. Whitney, a Yankee peddler from Vermont, moved to Columbus in 1845 and constructed the first wood frame store building in the community on the land where the Whitney now stands. The building served as a combination store/tavern/rooming house and post office, with Whitney as the first postmaster. In 1857, the building burned down and was replaced by the current Whitney Hotel in 1858. This cream brick, Italianate-style hotel's third floor ballroom was heated by six wood-burning stoves. The local newspaper reported on a ball there in 1863, "if you ever hear of a ball by Fuller, ask no questions, but go at once, and enjoy yourselves, and for one night forget the 'fear of the draft'".

During the 1880s, The Whitney hosted traveling health practitioners whose expertise ranged from "delivering a 40-foot long tape worm" to a local couple to curing piles. Near the turn of the 20th century, the ballroom was turned into an apartment, and from then on served as commercial, professional, and apartment space.

In the 1950s, a restaurant and bar occupied the first floor of the building. From the 1960s to the present, a succession of owners occupied the building and maintenance was deferred. In the 1950s, the building fell into disrepair and as a result of its continued decline, faced demolition in 1990. In February 1991, Heartland Properties, Inc. helped local citizens create the Columbus Downtown Development Corporation (CDDC), which served as the developer to restore the Whitney.

The building changed hands many times over the years and was often remodeled. In recent years it was allowed to deteriorate and was a candidate for demolition in 1991.

Today, the Whitney provides affordable housing for eight households and 1,570 square feet of downtown retail space for local businesses

== Gallery ==
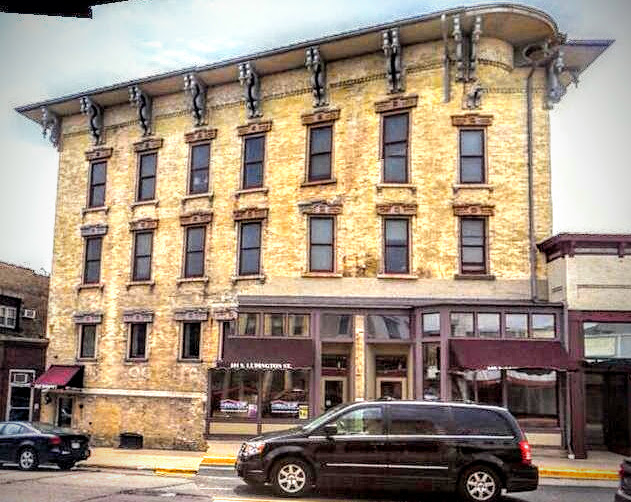
The hotel in 2016

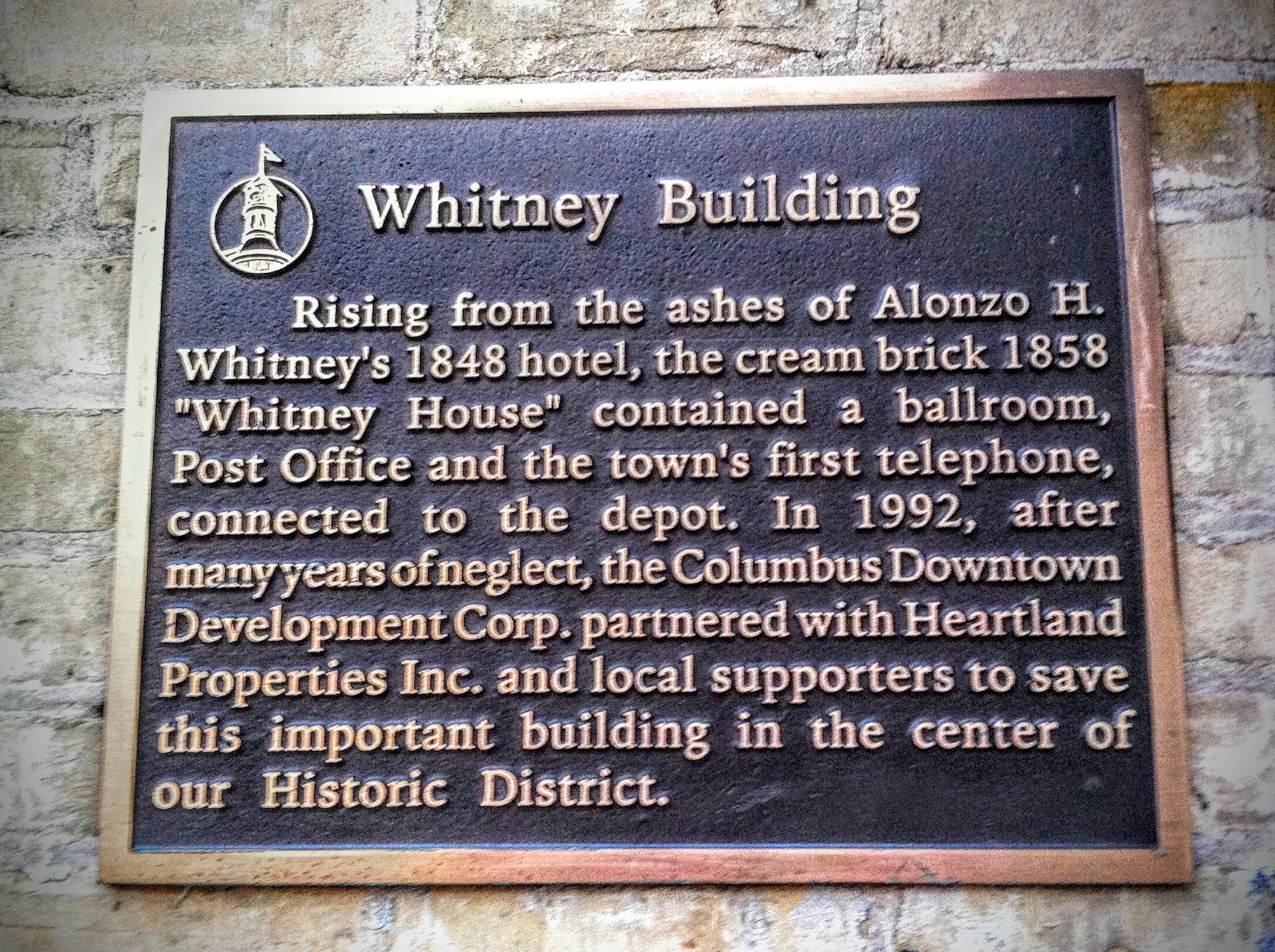
NRHP plaque
