= Columbus, Wisconsin =

- City
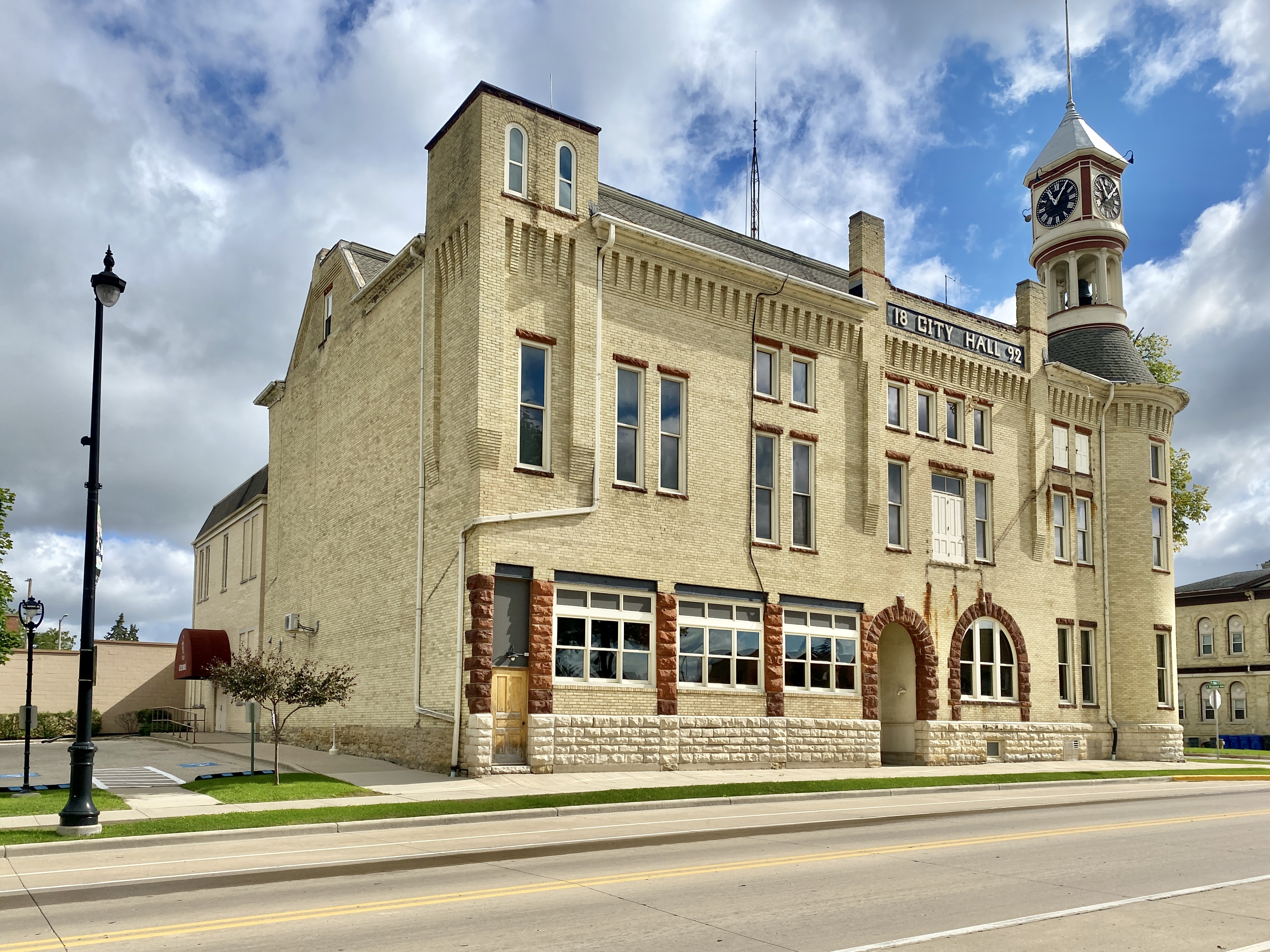
- Columbus City Hall
- Nickname: "Red Bud City"
- Location of Columbus in Columbia and Dodge counties, Wisconsin

- Location within Wisconsin Location within the United States
- Coordinates: 43°20′20″N 89°00′55″W
- Country: United States
- State: Wisconsin
- Counties: Columbia, Dodge

Government
  - Mayor: Joe Hammer

Area
  - Total: 4.59 sq mi (11.89 km^{2})
  - Land: 4.55 sq mi (11.79 km^{2})
  - Water: 0.039 sq mi (0.1 km^{2})
- Elevation: 879 ft (268 m)

Population (2020)
  - Total: 5,540
  - Density: 1,125/sq mi (434.2/km^{2})
- Time zone: UTC-6 (Central)
  - Summer (DST): UTC-5 (Central)
- Zip Code: 53925
- Area code: 920
- FIPS code: 55-16450
- GNIS feature ID: 1583005
- Website: https://www.cityofcolumbuswi.com/

Columbus is a city in Columbia and Dodge counties in the U.S. state of Wisconsin. The population was 5,540 at the 2020 census, all of which resided in Columbia County. Columbus is located about 28 miles (45 km) northeast of Madison on the Crawfish River.

== History ==
Before European settlement of the region, the area was territory of the Ho-Chunk Nation, who were the primary inhabitants of south-central Wisconsin, including the Columbus region. The Crawfish River was an important part of their trade. Sometimes, other tribes challenged the ownership over the region. For example, the Sauk and Meskwaki peoples.

The earliest European settlers of Columbus were Majors Elbert Dickason and Lewis Ludington, arriving in 1838 and 1839, respectively. Dickason, following military discharge from the Black Hawk War, returned in 1839 to find Lewis Ludington enjoying the same area of land that he had purchased through the government land office for $1.25 an acre.

Dickason built a log cabin on the banks of the Crawfish River, located across the railroad tracks from what is now the north end of Dickason Boulevard. He is credited with naming the settlement after Christopher Columbus. Lewis Ludington's land purchases were registered in the Green Bay Office of Land Management in 1839, signaling that a settlement had been established. In 1847, the state legislature declared that Columbus should become the county seat of justice, but that designation only lasted until 1851, when Portage became the county seat.

By the 1850s, the settlement in Columbus had become well established. The surrounding countryside was also becoming inhabited by adventurous families, establishing themselves as the farmers and responding to the needs of not only their own families, but also to the people in this city and beyond. In 1857, the Chicago, Milwaukee, St. Paul & Pacific Railroad reached Columbus, establishing it as a grain and dairy shipping hub. In 1864, the settlement at Columbus was incorporated as a village.

On February 26, 1874, the village officially became incorporated as a city. During this time, much of the Columbus Downtown Historic District was built.

The Farmers and Merchants Union Bank, designed by Louis Sullivan in 1919–1920, is a nationally recognized Prairie School architectural landmark.

== Geography ==
Columbus is located at 43°20′14″N 89°1′21″W (43.337366, -89.022753).

According to the United States Census Bureau, the city has a total area of 4.59 square miles (11.89 km^{2}), of which 4.55 square miles (11.78 km^{2}) is land and 0.04 square miles (0.10 km^{2}) is water.

=== Climate ===
Columbus

Climate chart (precipitation, max. and min. temperature)
J	F	M	A	M	J	J	A	S	O	N	D
83 −8 −12	80 −6 −13	82 5 −5	160 17 2	122 22 7	163 25 15	91 26 17	95 24 14	75 22 11	107 15 5	62 7 −2	70 −5 −12
- █ Average max. and min. temperatures in °C
- █ Precipitation totals in mm
Imperial conversion
J	F	M	A	M	J	J	A	S	O	N	D
3.3 18 10	3.1 21 9	3.2 41 23	6.3 63 36	4.8 72 45	6.4 77 59	3.6 79 63	3.7 75 57	3 72 52	4.2 59 41	2.4 45 28	2.8 23 10
- █ Average max. and min. temperatures in °F
- █ Precipitation totals in inches

== Demographics ==
Historical population
Census	Pop.	Note	%±
1850	288		—
1860	892		209.7%
1870	1,888		111.7%
1880	1,876		−0.6%
1890	1,977		5.4%
1900	2,349		18.8%
1910	2,523		7.4%
1920	2,460		−2.5%
1930	2,514		2.2%
1940	2,760		9.8%
1950	3,250		17.8%
1960	3,467		6.7%
1970	3,789		9.3%
1980	4,049		6.9%
1990	4,093		1.1%
2000	4,479		9.4%
2010	4,991		11.4%
2020	5,540		11.0%
U.S. Decennial Census

=== 2020 census ===
As of the 2020 census, 5,540 people were living in Columbus, Wisconsin. The population density was 1,216.8 inhabitants per square mile (469.8/km^{2}). There were 2,444 housing units at an average density of 536.8 units per square mile (207.3 units/km^{2}). Ethnically, the population was 5.2% Hispanic or Latino of any race. When grouping both Hispanic and non-Hispanic people together by race, the city was 90.5% White, 1.5% Black or African American, 0.8% Asian, 0.1% Native American, 0.1% Pacific Islander, 1.7% from other races, and 5.4% from two or more races.

According to the American Community Survey estimates for 2016–2020, the median income for a household in the city was $65,029, and the median income for a family was $81,413. Male full-time workers had a median income of $54,328 versus $42,118 for female workers. The per capita income for the city was $33,946. About 3.3% of families and 3.9% of the population were below the poverty line, including 2.9% of those under age 18 and 4.4% of those age 65 or over. Of the population age 25 and over, 94.4% were high school graduates or higher and 36.1% had a bachelor's degree or higher.

=== 2010 census ===
As of the census of 2010, there were 4,991 people, 2,123 households, and 1,336 families living in the city. The population density was 1,185.5 inhabitants per square mile (457.7/km^{2}). There were 2,287 housing units at an average density of 543.2 units per square mile (209.7 units/km^{2}). The racial makeup of the city was 95.7% White, 0.9% African American, 0.3% Native American, 0.6% Asian, 1.1% from other races, and 1.4% from two or more races. Hispanic or Latino people of any race were 3.3% of the population.

There were 2,123 households, of which 31.3% had children under the age of 18 living with them, 48.5% were married couples living together, 9.8% had a female householder with no husband present, 4.6% had a male householder with no wife present, and 37.1% were non-families. 30.8% of all households were made up of individuals, and 11.2% had someone living alone who was 65 years of age or older. The average household size was 2.33 and the average family size was 2.91.

The median age in the city was 38.3 years. 24.1% of residents were under the age of 18; 7.1% were between the ages of 18 and 24; 27.7% were from 25 to 44; 27.2% were from 45 to 64; and 14.1% were 65 years of age or older. The gender makeup of the city was 48.8% male and 51.2% female.

=== 2000 census ===
As of the census of 2000, there were 4,479 people, 1,843 households, and 1,194 families living in the city. The population density was 1,122.7 people per square mile (433.5 people/km^{2}). There were 1,927 housing units at an average density of 483.0 units per square mile (186.5 units/km^{2}). The racial makeup of the city was 98.28% White, 0.36% Black or African American, 0.22% Native American, 0.31% Asian, 0.02% Pacific Islander, 0.29% from other races, and 0.51% from two or more races. Hispanic or Latino people of any race were 0.98% of the population.

There were 1,843 households, out of which 32% had children under the age of 18 living with them, 52% were married couples living together, 9% had a female householder with no husband present, and 35.2% were non-families. 31.4% of all households were made up of individuals, and 14.1% had someone living alone who was 65 years of age or older. The average household size was 2.37 and the average family size was 2.98.

In the city, the population was spread out, with 26% under the age of 18, 6.6% from 18 to 24, 29.9% from 25 to 44, 20.2% from 45 to 64, and 17.3% who were 65 years of age or older. The median age was 38 years. For every 100 females, there were 91 males. For every 100 females age 18 and over, there were 87.1 males.

The median income for a household in the city was $42,667, and the median income for a family was $52,604. Males had a median income of $36,518 versus $22,891 for females. The per capita income for the city was $21,435. About 3.7% of families and 5.4% of the population were below the poverty line, including 4% of those under age 18 and 11.7% of those age 65 or over.

== Arts and culture ==
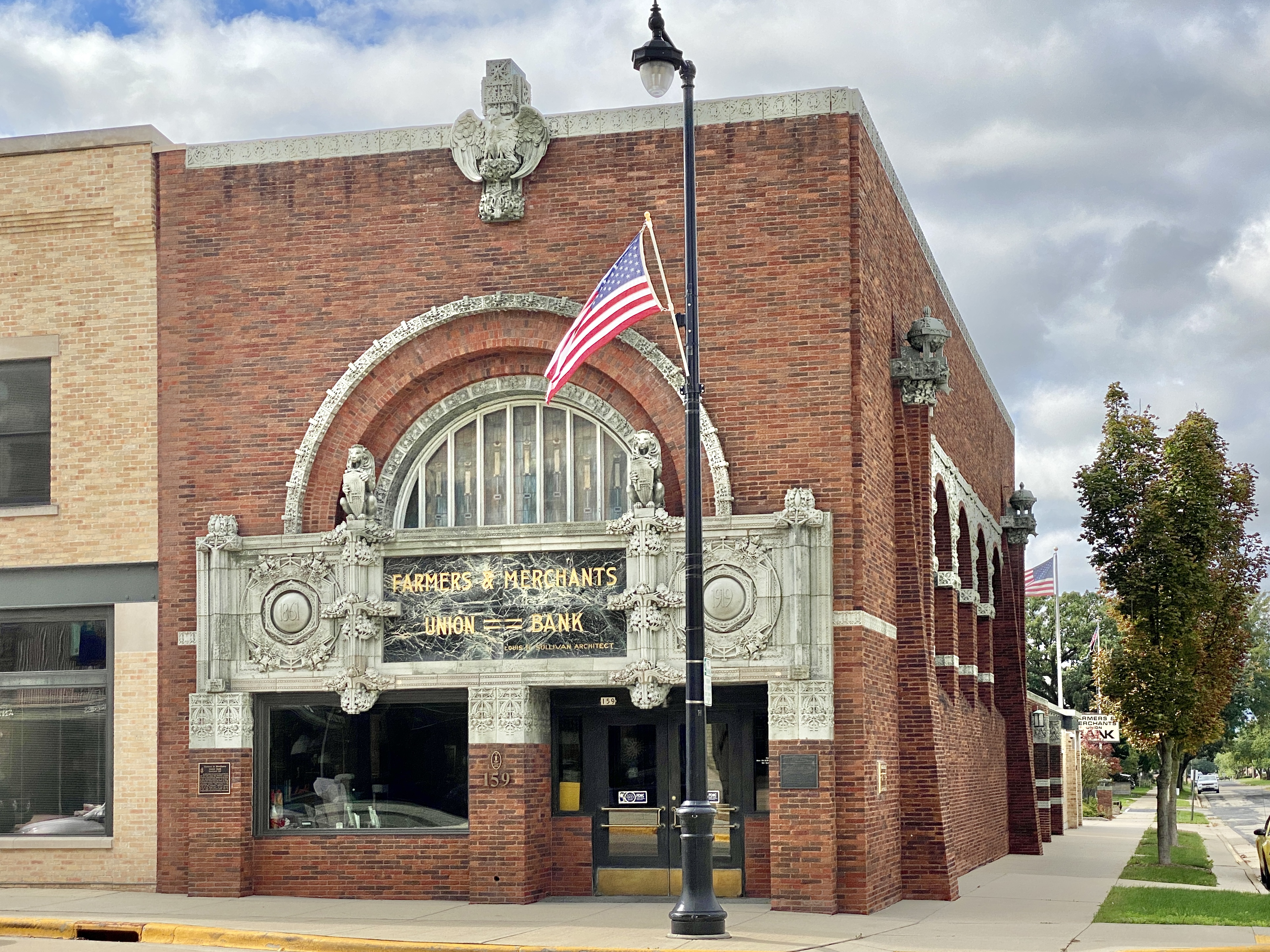
Farmers and Merchants Union Bank is a "jewel box" bank building designed by architect Louis Sullivan.

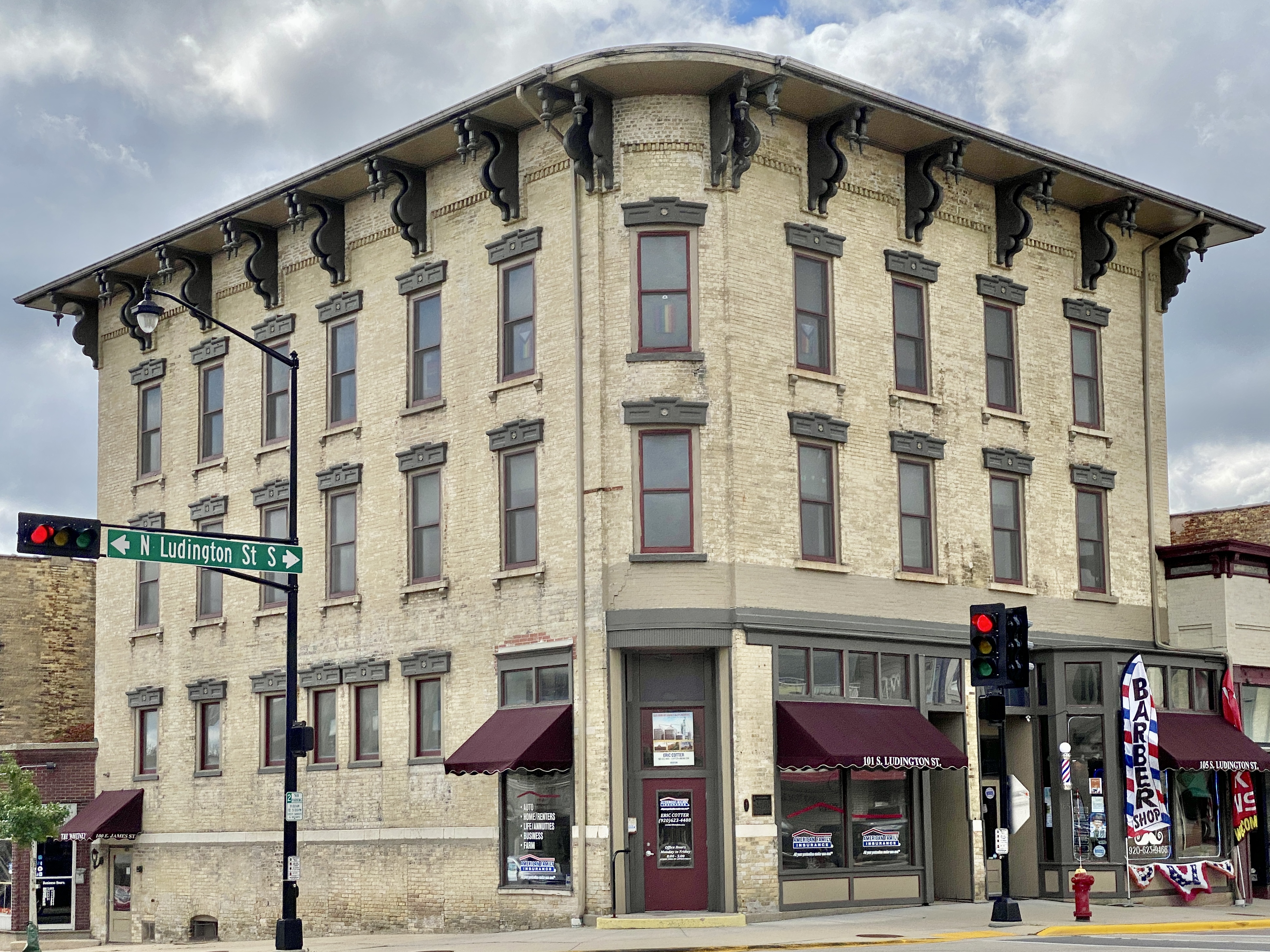
Whitney Hotel, part of the Columbus Downtown Historic District, was built in 1858.

The Redbud Festival is held in May around Mother's Day. Each year, the community crowns a prince and princess during the budding of the "Columbus Wisconsin Strain" of the redbud tree (Cercis canadensis). The festival includes brats, music, and trees in full bloom.

Downtown Columbus was used to film several scenes for the 2009 Johnny Depp movie Public Enemies. The Farmers and Merchants Union Bank is featured in the film.

=== Historic buildings ===
- Adolphus and Sarah Ingalsbe House
- Albert M. and Alice Bellack House
- Amtrak station (1906)
- Chapel Street Water Tower
- Columbus City Hall
- Columbus Fireman's Park Complex
- Columbus Post Office
- Columbus Public Library
- E. Clarke and Julia Arnold House
- F. A. Chadbourn House
- Farmers and Merchants Union Bank
- Frances Kurth Sharrow House
- Fred and Lucia Farnham House
- George Griswold House
- Gov. James T. Lewis House
- Holsten Family Farmstead
- John A. and Maggie Jones House
- Kurth Brewery
- Reinhard and Amelia Schendel House
- Whitney Hotel Building
- Zion Evangelical Lutheran Church and Parsonage

== Education ==
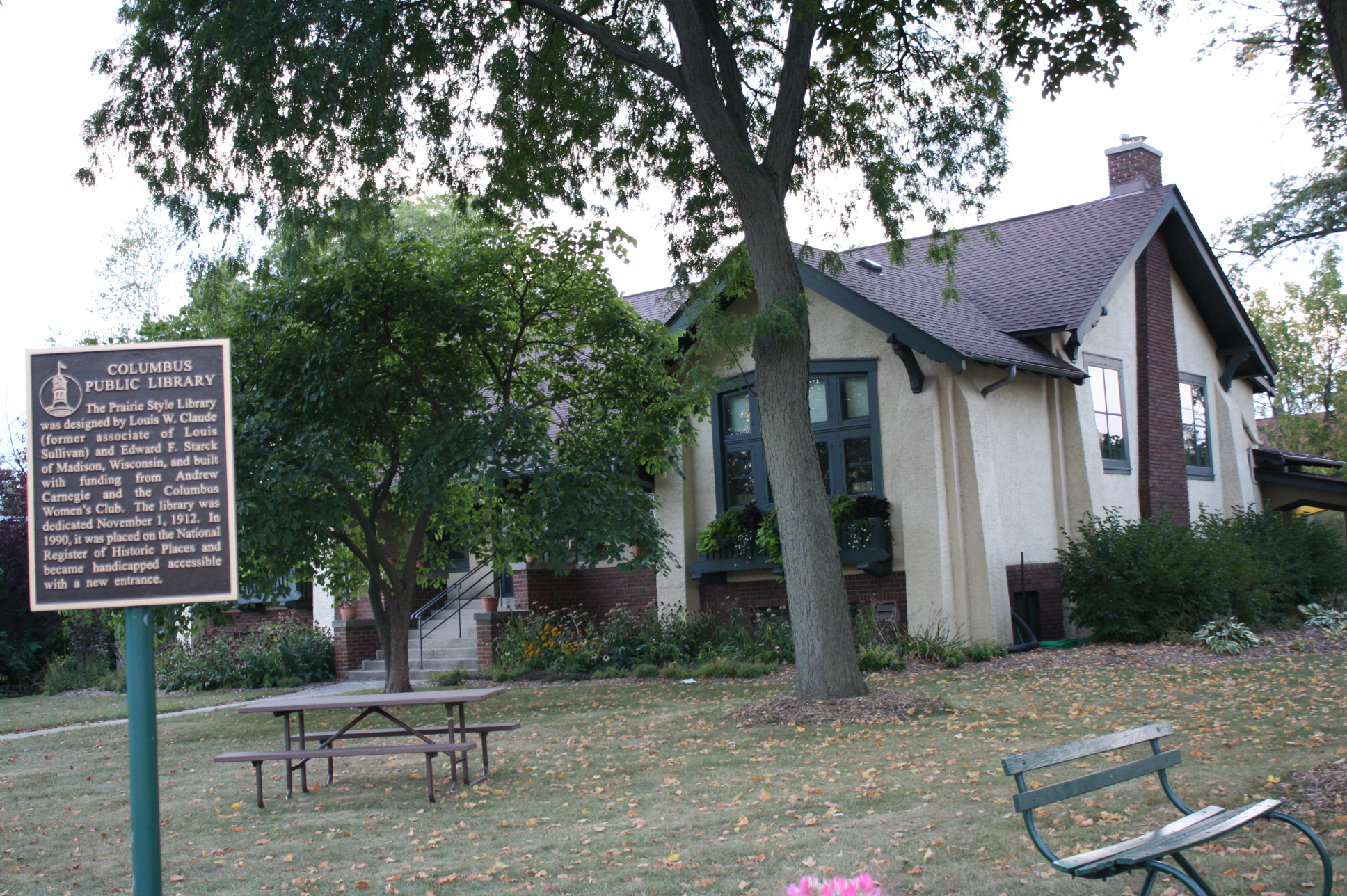
Columbus Public Library

Columbus is served by the Columbus School District, which operates an elementary school, a middle school, and a high school:

- Columbus Elementary School (K-2)
- Columbus Intermediate School (3–5)
- Columbus Middle School (6–8)
- Columbus Senior High School (9–12)

Other schools in Columbus:

- St. Jerome Catholic School, Roman Catholic, grades K-8
- Zion Lutheran School, WELS (Wisconsin Evangelical Lutheran Synod), grades K-8
- Wisconsin Academy, Seventh Day Adventist, grades 9–12

== Transportation ==
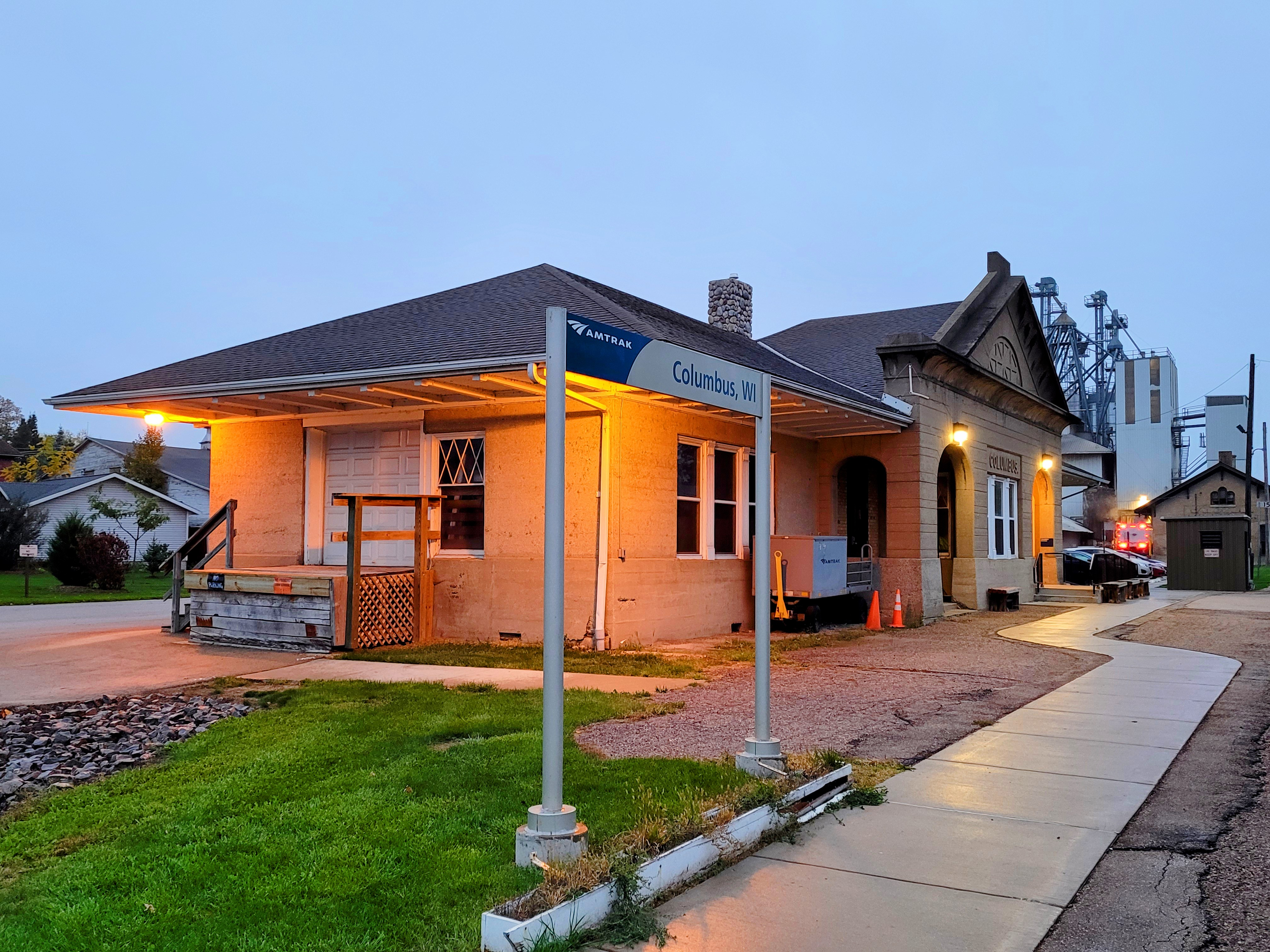
Columbus station

Columbus is served by US 151. Columbus is almost halfway on the US 151 freeway/expressway between Madison and Fond du Lac. There are three exits on the freeway that serve Columbus. The exits are Wis 73/Business US 151 Park Ave (Exit 115), Wis 16/Wis 60 James St (Exit 118) and Wis 73/Business US 151 Ludington St (Exit 120). Columbus is also served by 4 state highways:

- Wis 16 runs northwest towards Portage and east with Wis 60 for several miles before heading to Watertown.
- Wis 60 heads west to Lodi and east to Hustiford.
- Wis 73 runs south to Marshall and north to Randolph.
- Wis 89 heads south to Waterloo and Fort Atkinson.
- Business US 151 is cosigned with Wis 73 through Columbus.

Columbus is served by two daily Amtrak trains at Columbus station; the Empire Builder a long-distance train between Chicago and Portland and Seattle, and the Borealis a regional train that parallels the empire builder between Chicago and Saint Paul with an additional stop at Milwaukee General Mitchell. Both trains stop at the Columbus station. Freight railroad services are provided by the Soo Line Railroad, a legal U.S. alias of the Canadian Pacific Railway. Columbus has the distinction of hosting the primary Amtrak station for the Madison metro area.

Columbus is also served by Lamers Bus Service which provides a Connect to Madison, Wisconsin from Amtrak.

== Notable people ==
- Michael Adams, Wisconsin state representative and businessman
- Charles L. Dering, Wisconsin State Senator
- Francis Fagan, Navy Cross recipient
- Harmon J. Fisk, Wisconsin state representative
- William M. Griswold, Wisconsin state senator
- Joshua James Guppey, Union Army general
- William Jones, Wisconsin state representative
- Frank Lange, major league baseball player
- James T. Lewis, governor of Wisconsin
- Lewis Ludington, early settler of Columbus.
- Heather Miller, Olympic athlete
- Peter Morris, major league baseball player
- William Penterman, Wisconsin state representative
- Bob Poser, major league baseball player
- Frederick J. Stare, nutritionist
- Samuel R. Webster, Wisconsin state representative
- Russel R. Weisensel, Wisconsin state representative
- E. W. Ziebarth, radio broadcaster
