= Columbus Post Office =

- U.S. National Register of Historic Places
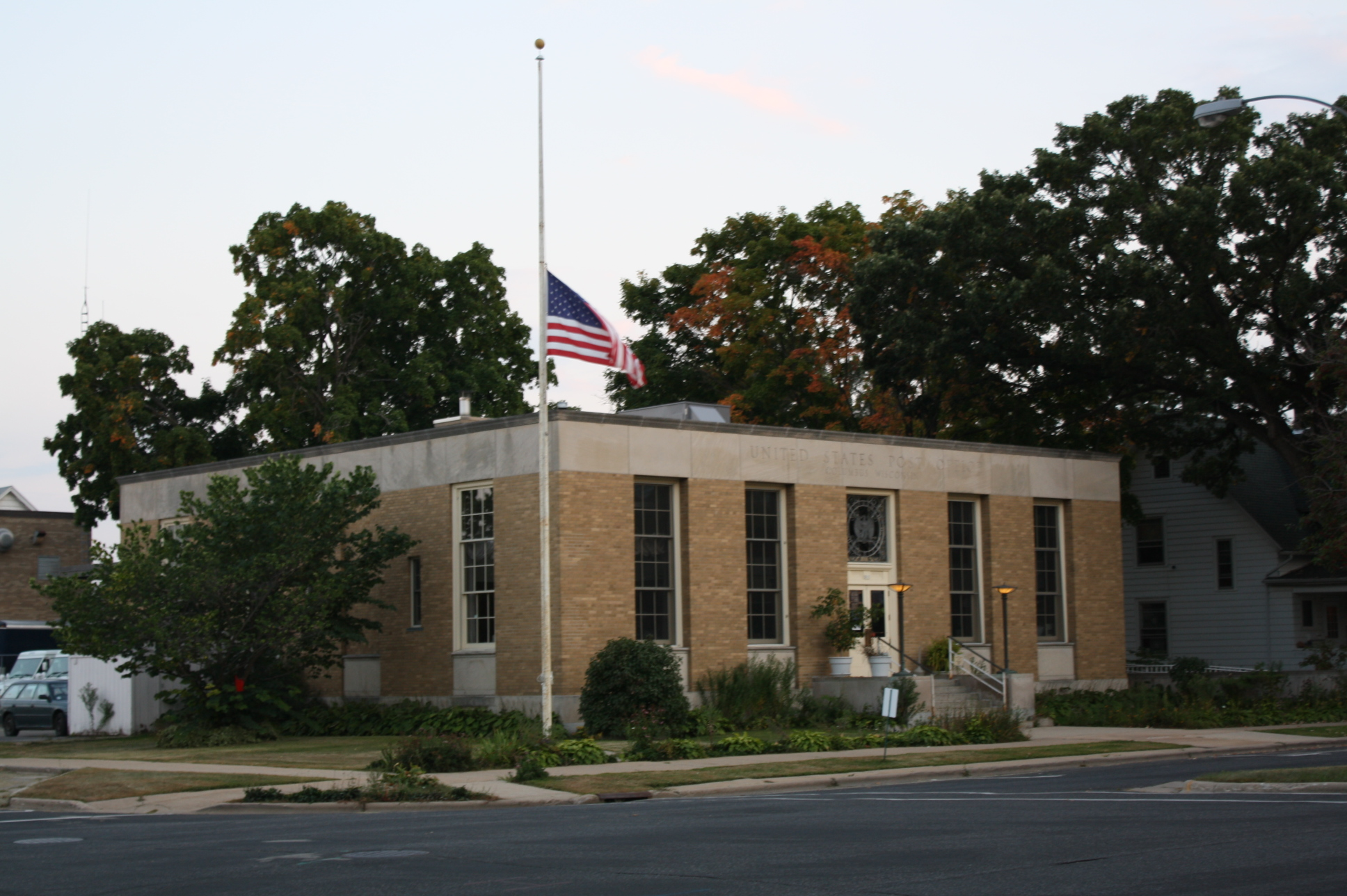

- Location within Wisconsin Location within the United States
- Location: 211 S. Dickason Blvd., Columbus, Wisconsin
- Coordinates: 43°20′16″N 89°0′59″W
- Area: less than one acre
- Built: 1938
- Architect: Blanch, Arnold; Simon, Louis A. and Melick, Neal A.
- Architectural style: Art Moderne
- MPS: United States Post Office Construction in Wisconsin MPS
- NRHP reference No.: 00001250
- Added to NRHP: October 24, 2000

The Columbus Post Office is the main post office in Columbus, Wisconsin. The post office was built in 1938 by the Public Works Administration and opened in 1939. The brick building was designed in the Art Moderne style. Arnold Blanch painted a mural in the post office in 1940 to honor the founding of Columbus; the mural includes the city's first log cabin settlement, farmers and grains from the area, and depictions of typical 1930s residents of the city. The post office was added to the National Register of Historic Places on October 24, 2000.
