= Columbus School District =

School district in Wisconsin, US

Coordinates: 43°20′11.7″N 89°01′09.7″W

The Columbus School District encompasses an area of approximately 135 miles (217 km) in Columbia, Dodge and Dane counties. Located in the south central Wisconsin city of Columbus, the district is approximately 70 miles (110 km) northwest of Milwaukee, 30 miles (48 km) northeast of Madison and 30 miles (48 km) southeast of Portage.

== Schools ==
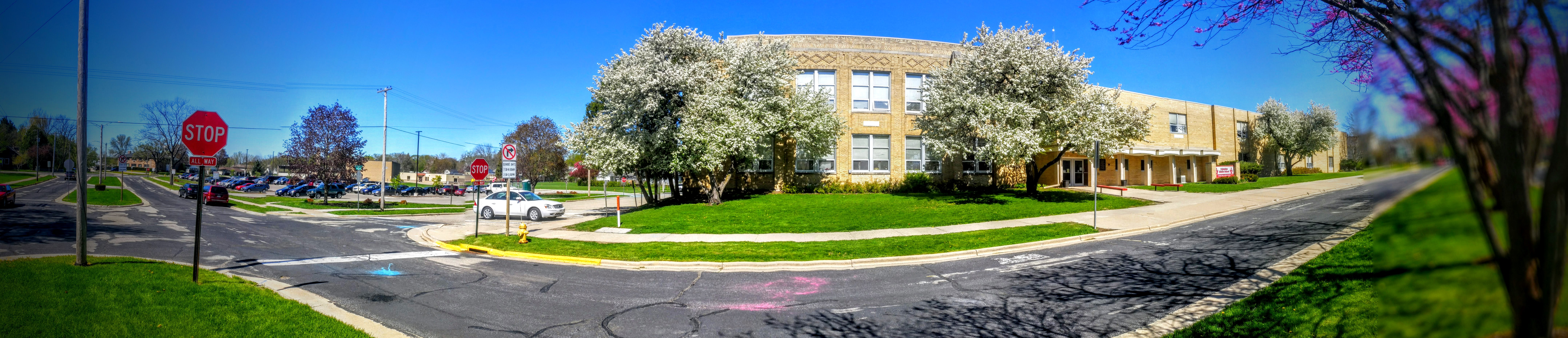
Columbus Middle School

The Columbus School District operates three public schools and one charter school.

- Columbus Elementary School: Grades K-5
- Discovery Charter School
- Columbus Middle School: Grades 6-8
- Columbus Senior High School: Grades 9-12

== Governance ==
The superintendent of schools is Jacob Flood.
