= Columbus Public Library (Columbus, Wisconsin) =

- U.S. National Register of Historic Places
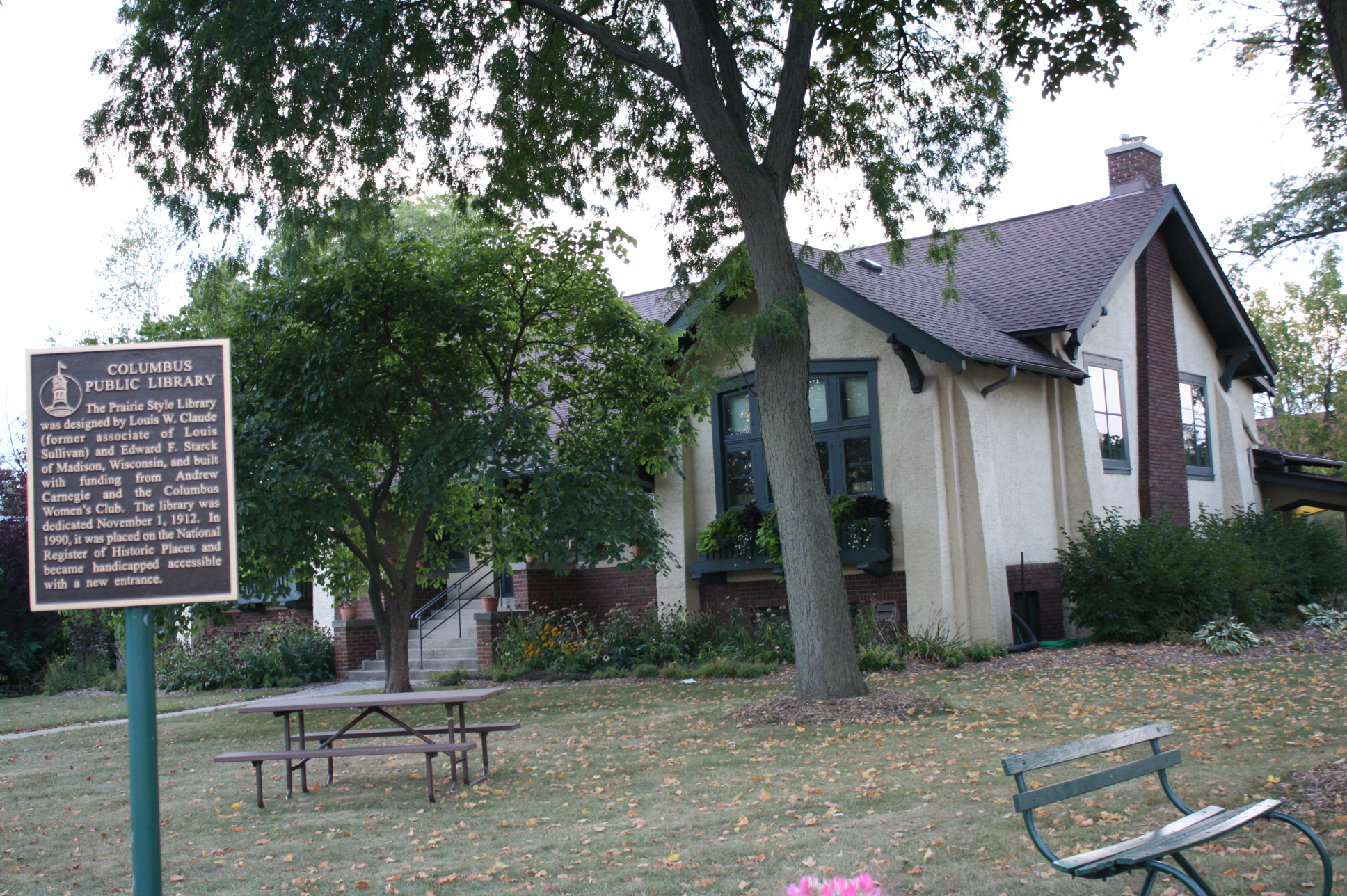

- Location within Wisconsin Location within the United States
- Location: 223 W. James St., Columbus, Wisconsin
- Coordinates: 43°20′20″N 89°0′58″W
- Area: less than one acre
- Built: 1912
- Architect: Claude & Starck
- Architectural style: Prairie School
- MPS: Public Library Facilities of Wisconsin MPS
- NRHP reference No.: 90001704
- Added to NRHP: November 15, 1990

The Columbus Public Library is a Carnegie library in Columbus, Wisconsin. The library was built in 1912 after the Columbus Women's Civic Club convinced the Carnegie Foundation to sponsor a building for the community's library program. Claude and Starck, a Madison architectural firm known for designing libraries, planned the Prairie School building. The library is still in operation; in addition to library services, the building also held Women's Civic Club meetings and various other community meetings. On November 15, 1990, the library was added to the National Register of Historic Places.

== Gallery ==
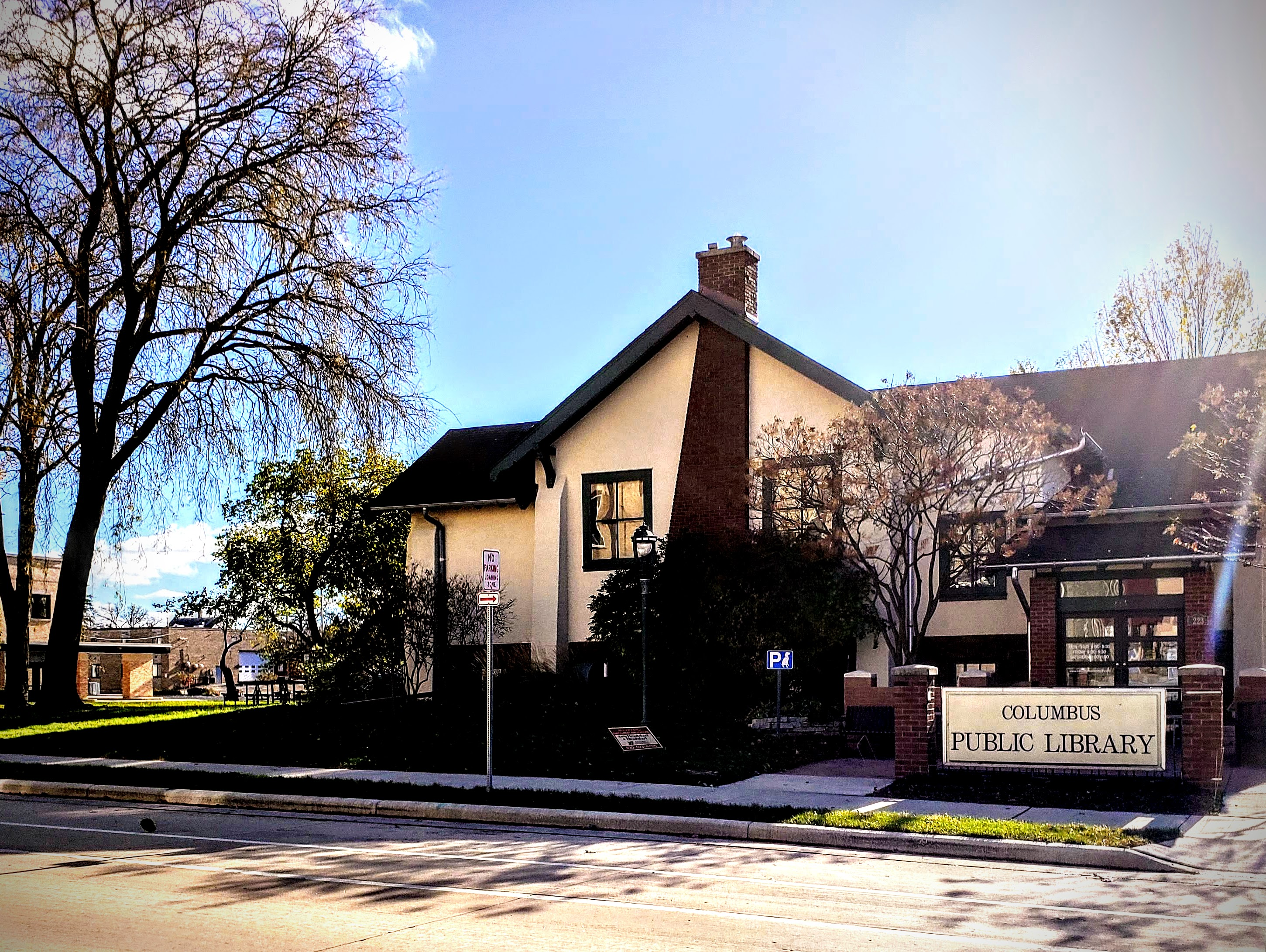

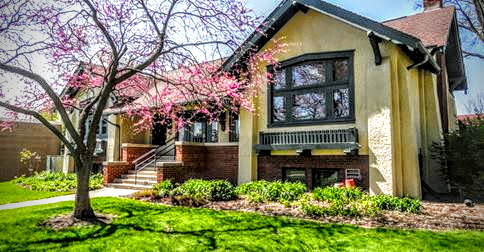
