= John A. and Maggie Jones House =

Historic house in Wisconsin, United States

- U.S. National Register of Historic Places
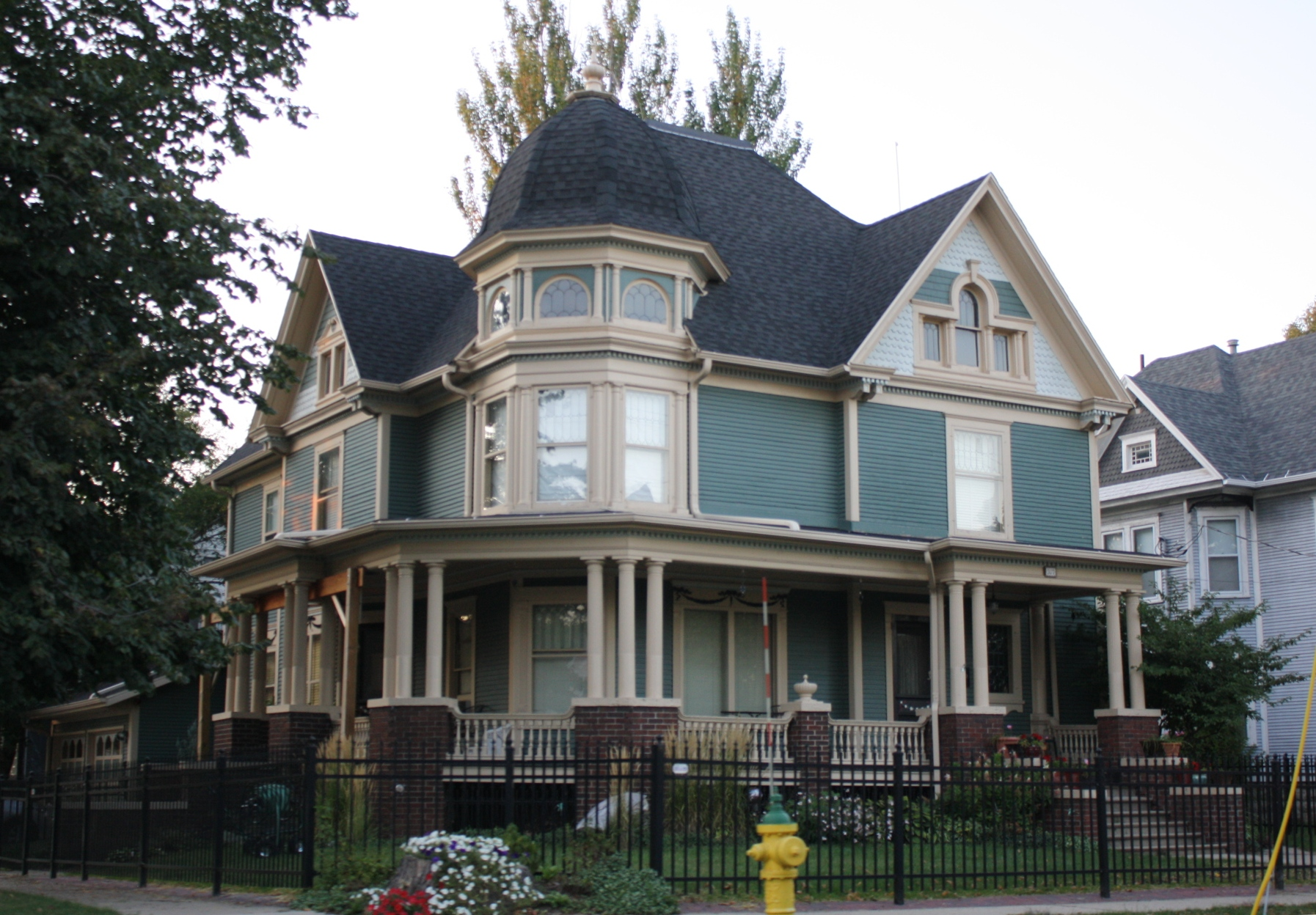
- John A. and Maggie Jones House

- Location within Wisconsin
- Location: 307 N. Ludington St., Columbus, Wisconsin
- Coordinates: 43°20′24″N 89°00′46″W
- Area: less than one acre
- Built: 1900
- Architectural style: Queen Anne
- NRHP reference No.: 09000581
- Added to NRHP: July 30, 2009

The John A. and Maggie Jones House is a historic house at 307 N. Ludington Street in Columbus, Wisconsin.

== History ==
The house was built in 1900 for noted Columbus pharmacist John A. Jones and his wife Maggie May Roberts Jones. The two-and-a-half story house has a Queen Anne design, a style which was popular both locally and nationally at the time; the house's architect is unknown. The house's design includes a wraparound front porch supported by Tuscan columns, an octagonal tower on the southern corner, and a complex roof with shingled gable ends. The Jones couple lived in the house until their deaths in 1946 and 1948. The house was added to the State and the National Register of Historic Places in 2009.
