= Reinhard and Amelia Schendel House =

Historic house in Wisconsin, United States

- U.S. National Register of Historic Places
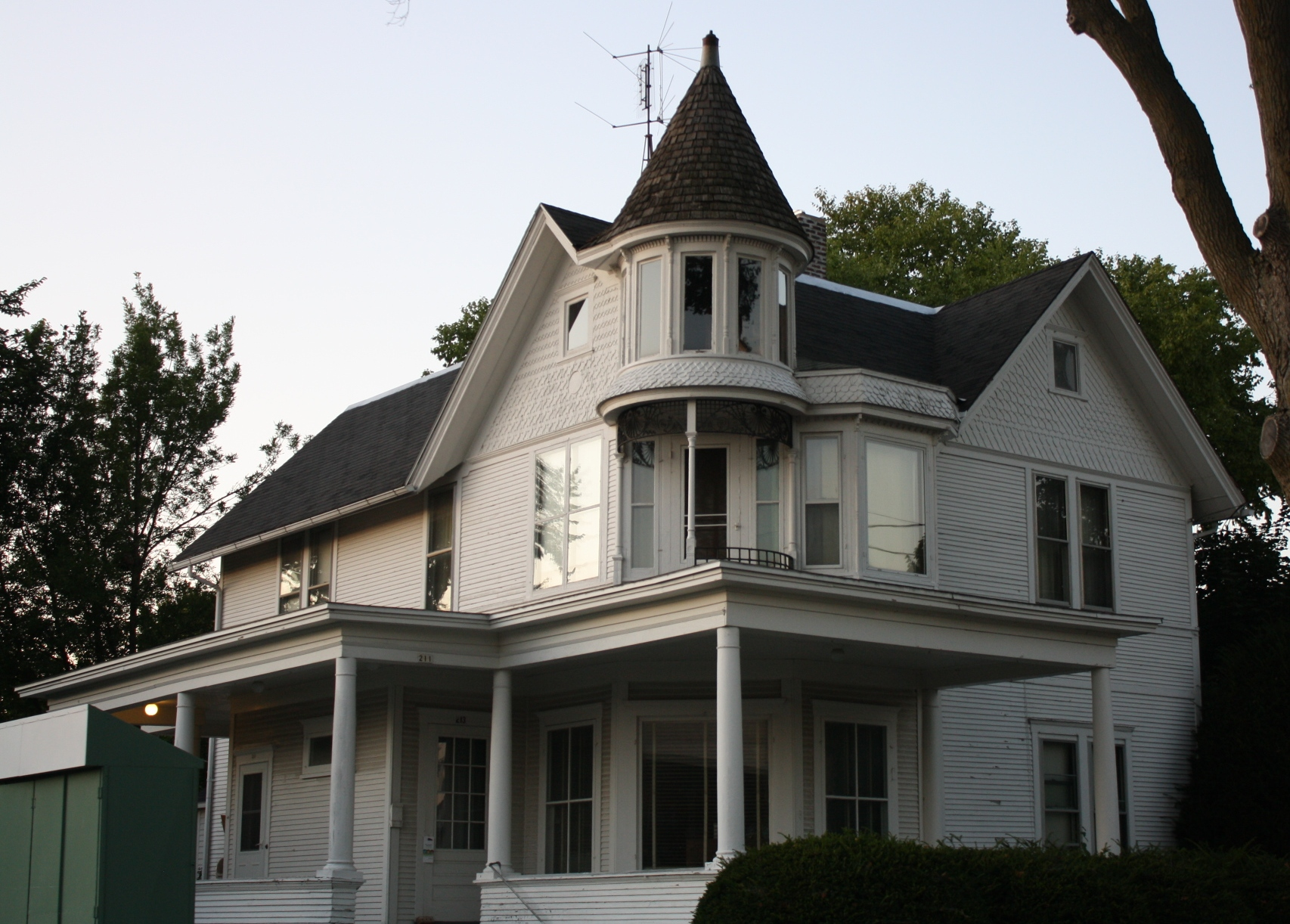

- Location within Wisconsin Location within the United States
- Location: 211 N Ludington St, Columbus, Wisconsin
- Coordinates: 43°20′21″N 89°00′49″W
- Area: less than one acre
- Built: 1894
- Architectural style: Queen Anne
- NRHP reference No.: 10000319
- Added to NRHP: June 7, 2010

The Reinhard and Amelia Schendel House is a historic Queen Anne style house located at 211 North Ludington Street in Columbus, Wisconsin.

== Description and history ==
The house was built in 1894 for Reinhard Schendel, a Prussian immigrant and lumber dealer, and his wife Amelia. The house includes a tower on one corner and a wraparound porch, both typical features of Queen Anne architecture. The gable ends of the house are covered in decorative wood shingles in various designs; the left gable end features star-shaped shingles around a full moon, the front gable end features shingles shaped like playing card suits, and the right gable end includes more suit-shaped shingles and a variety of other shapes. The Schendel couple lived in the house until Amelia died in 1924. The house is now used for apartments.

On June 7, 2010, the house was added to the National Register of Historic Places.
