= George Griswold House =

Historic house in Columbus, Wisconsin

- U.S. National Register of Historic Places
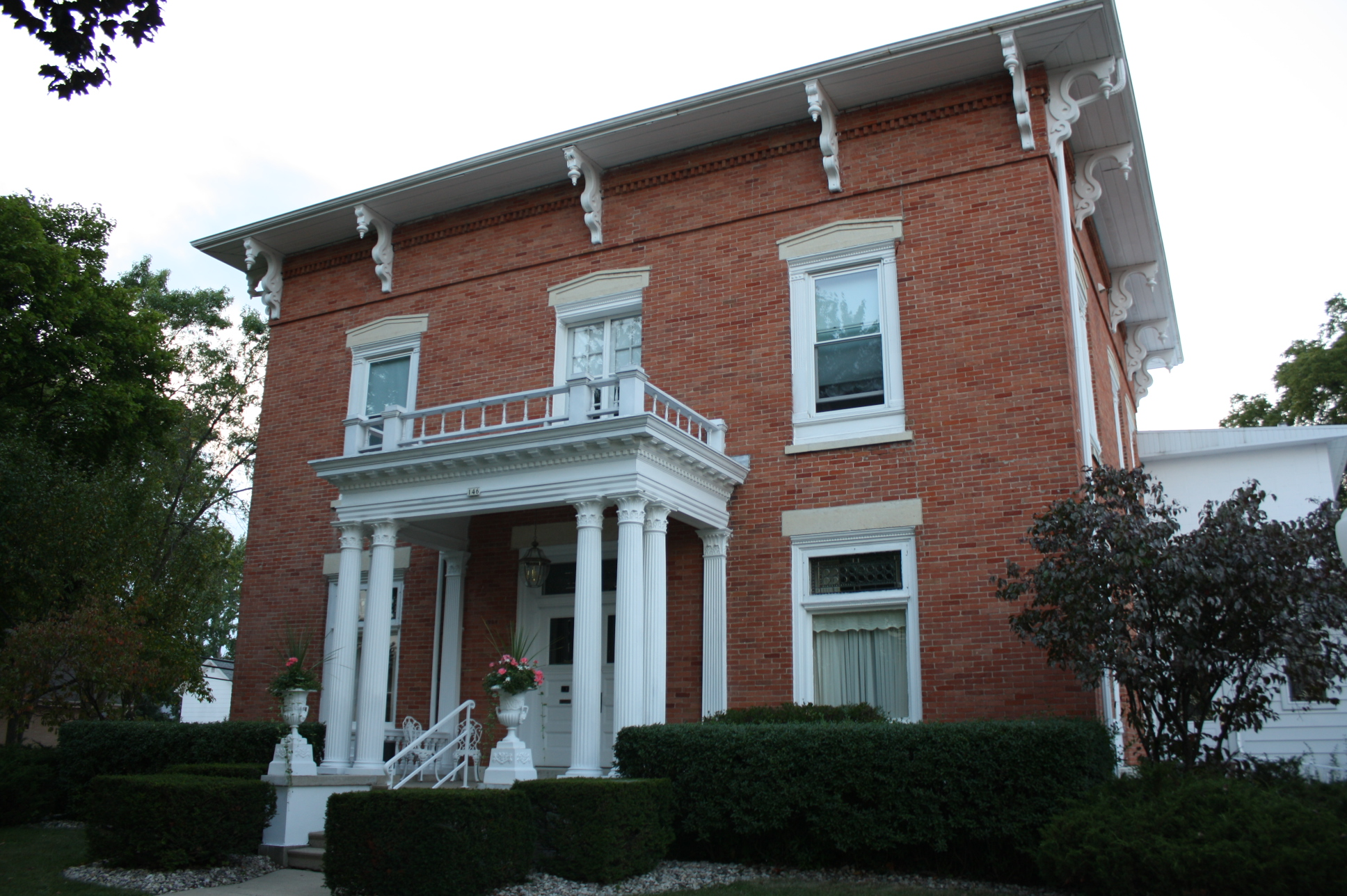

- Location within Wisconsin Location within the United States
- Location: 146 S. Dickson Blvd. Columbus, Wisconsin
- Coordinates: 43°20′19″N 89°1′0″W
- Area: less than one acre
- Built: 1858
- Architect: E. D. Baldwin
- Architectural style: Italianate
- NRHP reference No.: 09000487
- Added to NRHP: July 1, 2009

The George Griswold House is located in Columbus, Wisconsin, United States. It was added to the National Register of Historic Places in 2009. Additionally, it is listed on the Wisconsin State Register of Historic Places.

== History ==
The house was constructed from 1857 to 1858. It was owned by George Griswold, a store owner suffering from deteriorating eyesight who moved to Columbus from New York City. The floor plan of the house was designed after the house he grew up in as a child, thought to be at least partially so he was already familiar with the layout after his sight would begin to deteriorate further. Currently, the building is used as a funeral home.
