= Columbus Senior High School =

School in Columbus, Wisconsin, United States

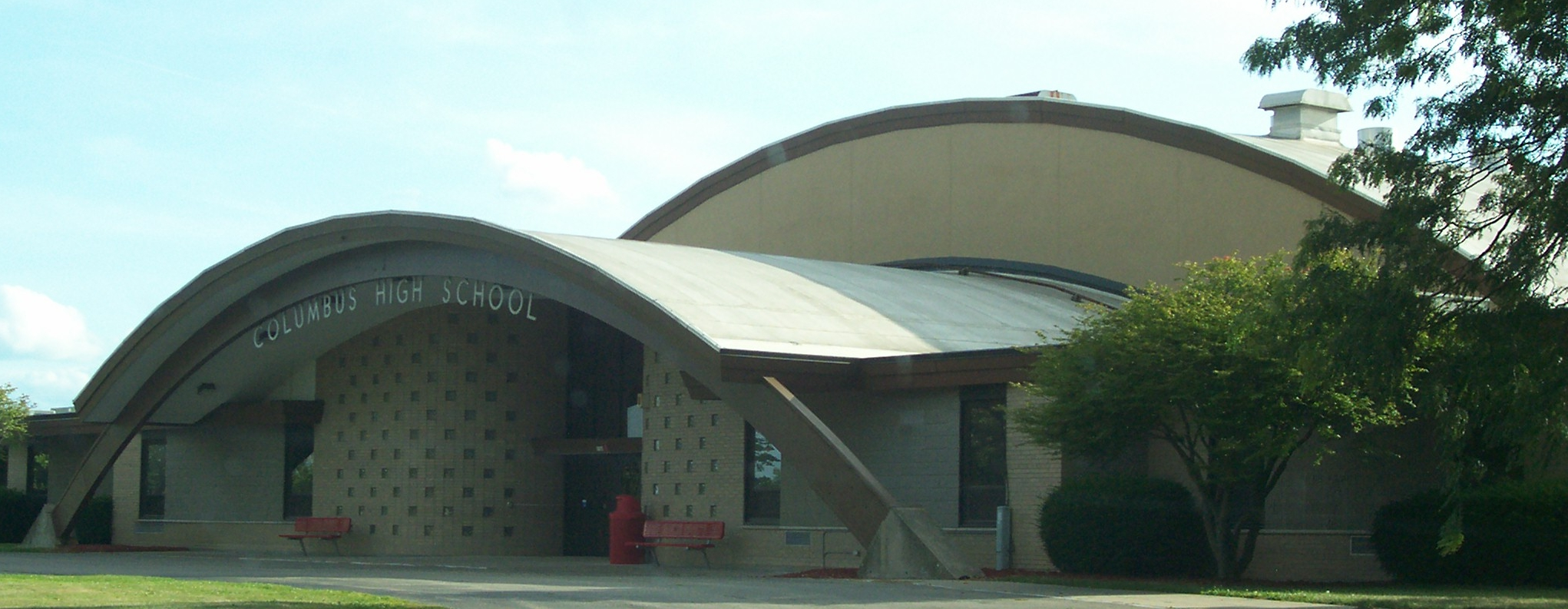
- Main Entrance To CHS (2007)

Location
- 1164 Farnham Street; Columbus, Columbia, Wisconsin 53925; United States; 43.32694°N 89.02039°W

Information
- School type: Public Secondary
- Established: 1875
- School district: Columbus School District
- Superintendent: Jacob Flood
- Principal: Arik Gunderson
- Teaching staff: 29.35 (FTE)
- Grades: 9 to 12
- Gender: Coeducational
- Enrollment: 370 (2023-2024)
- Student to teacher ratio: 12.61
- Colors: Red and White
- Slogan: "Learning Today, Leading Tomorrow"
- Mascot: "Charlie" the Cardinal
- Newspaper: The Clarion
- Feeder schools: St. Jerome Catholic School, Columbus Middle School
- Website: https://www.columbus.k12.wi.us/schools/columbus-high-school/chs-home

Columbus Senior High School (CHS) is a public secondary school in Columbus, Wisconsin. Part of the Columbus School District, the school had an enrollment of 385 in 2023.

In addition to traditional high school offerings, Columbus High School students also have the opportunity to choose from electives in the areas of technology education, agri-science, business education, world languages and the arts, plus a host of co-curricular offerings.

== History ==
Columbus Senior High School was established in 1875 at what is now the current Columbus Middle School at 200 West School Street. In 1958, the school district expanded and built what is now the current high school at 1164 Farnham Street.

== Extracurricular activities ==
=== Clubs ===
- FBLA-PBL
- FFA
- Marching band
- Concert band
- Jazz band
- Dance team
- Academic bowl
- Gay-Straight Alliance
- Art club
- Choir
- Forensics
- French and Spanish club
- Math club
- National Honor Society
- Student council
- Yearbook
- A/V club
- Chess Club

=== Sports ===
The athletic program at the Columbus High School is very popular with the community. CHS sports are regulated by the WIAA, where CHS is a member of the Capitol North Conference Division 2.

- Archery
- Baseball
- Boys' basketball
- Boys' cross country
- Boys' track
- Boys' soccer
- Football
- Girls' basketball
- Girls' cross country
- Girls' tennis
- Girls' track
- Girls' soccer
- Golf
- Gymnastics
- Softball
- Volleyball
- Wrestling

==== State champions ====
- Softball - Class B - 1984
- Football - Division 4 - 1990
- Football - Division 4 - 1996
- Girls' basketball - Division 2 - 2002
- Girls' basketball - Division 2 - 2003
- Girls' track - Division 2 - 2004
- Boys' soccer - Division 3 - 2008
- Football - Division 4 - 2022

==== Athletic conference affiliation history ====
- Little Ten Conference (1925-1966)
- Northern Little Ten Conference (1966-1970)
- Central Suburban Conference (1970-1977)
- Capitol Conference (1977-present)
