= Zion Evangelical Lutheran Church and Parsonage =

Historic church in Wisconsin, United States

- U.S. National Register of Historic Places
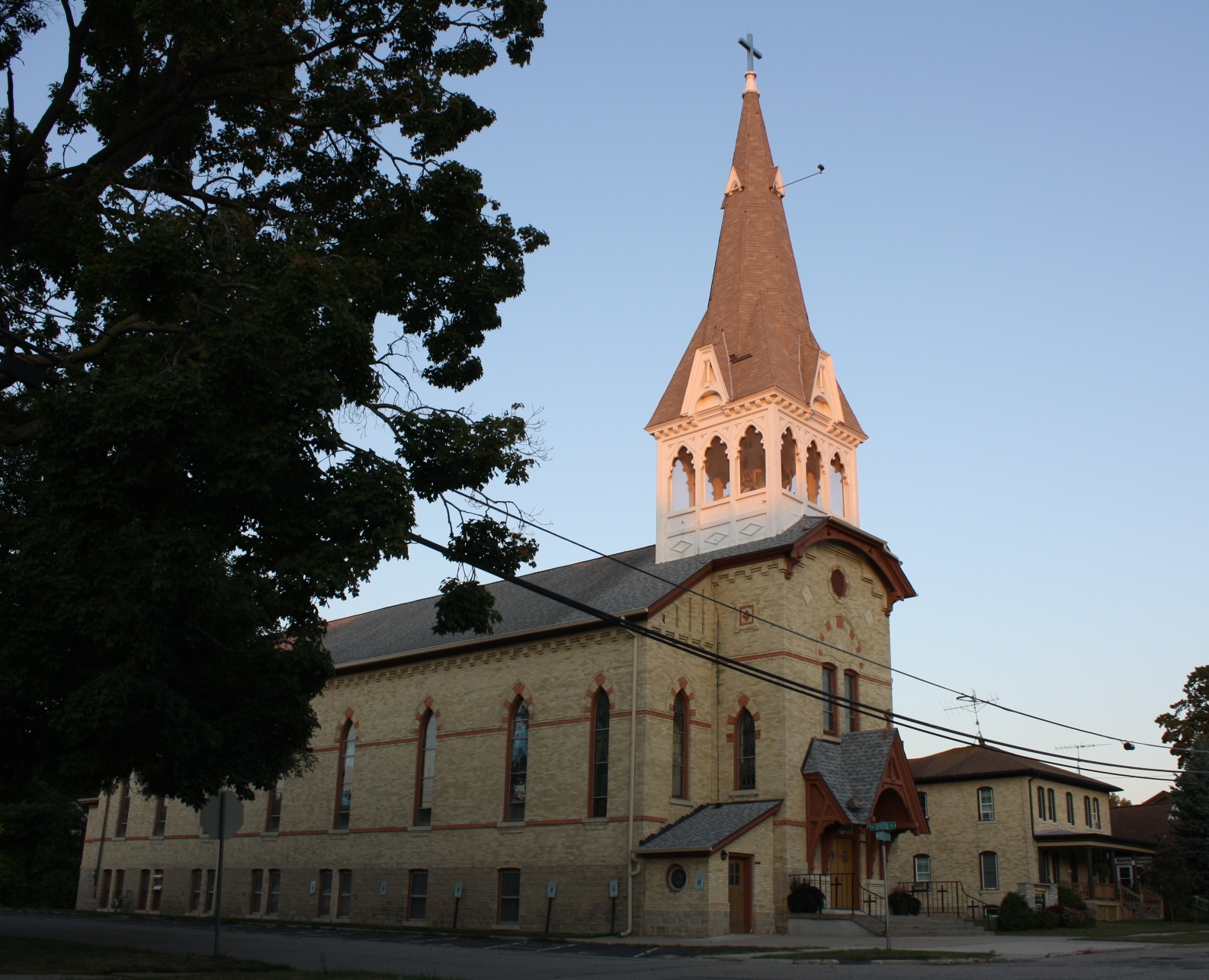
- Zion Evangelical Lutheran Church and Parsonage

- Location within Wisconsin Location within the United States
- Location: 236 and 254 W. Mill St. Columbus, Wisconsin
- Coordinates: 43°20′24″N 89°00′55″W
- Built: 1878/1885
- Architect: E. Townsend Mix/Richard D. Vanaken
- Architectural style: High Victorian Gothic/Italianate
- NRHP reference No.: 09000509
- Added to NRHP: July 8, 2009

The Zion Evangelical Lutheran Church and Parsonage is a historic church complex in Columbus, Wisconsin. The complex includes the 1878 church building at 254 W. Mill Street and the adjacent 1885 parsonage at 236 W. Mill Street. The buildings were added to the National Register of Historic Places in 2009.

== History ==
The church opened in 1878 to replace the Zion Lutheran congregation's original church, which was built in 1859 and moved to the Mill Street site in 1868. The congregation, which was founded in 1858, was the first Lutheran church in Columbus. Milwaukee architect Edward Townsend Mix designed the High Victorian Gothic church, which is marked by a 125-foot (38 m) steeple. The congregation expanded the church in 1887 to accommodate its growing congregation and add a new chancel, sacristy, baptismal font, and pipe organ.

The parsonage was built next to the church in 1885, replacing an earlier wood frame house. Carpenter Richard D. Vanaken, who also worked on the church, built and likely designed the Italianate building. The congregation built an addition onto the parsonage in 1903.
