= Kurth Brewery =

- Kurth, John H., and Company Office Building
- U.S. National Register of Historic Places
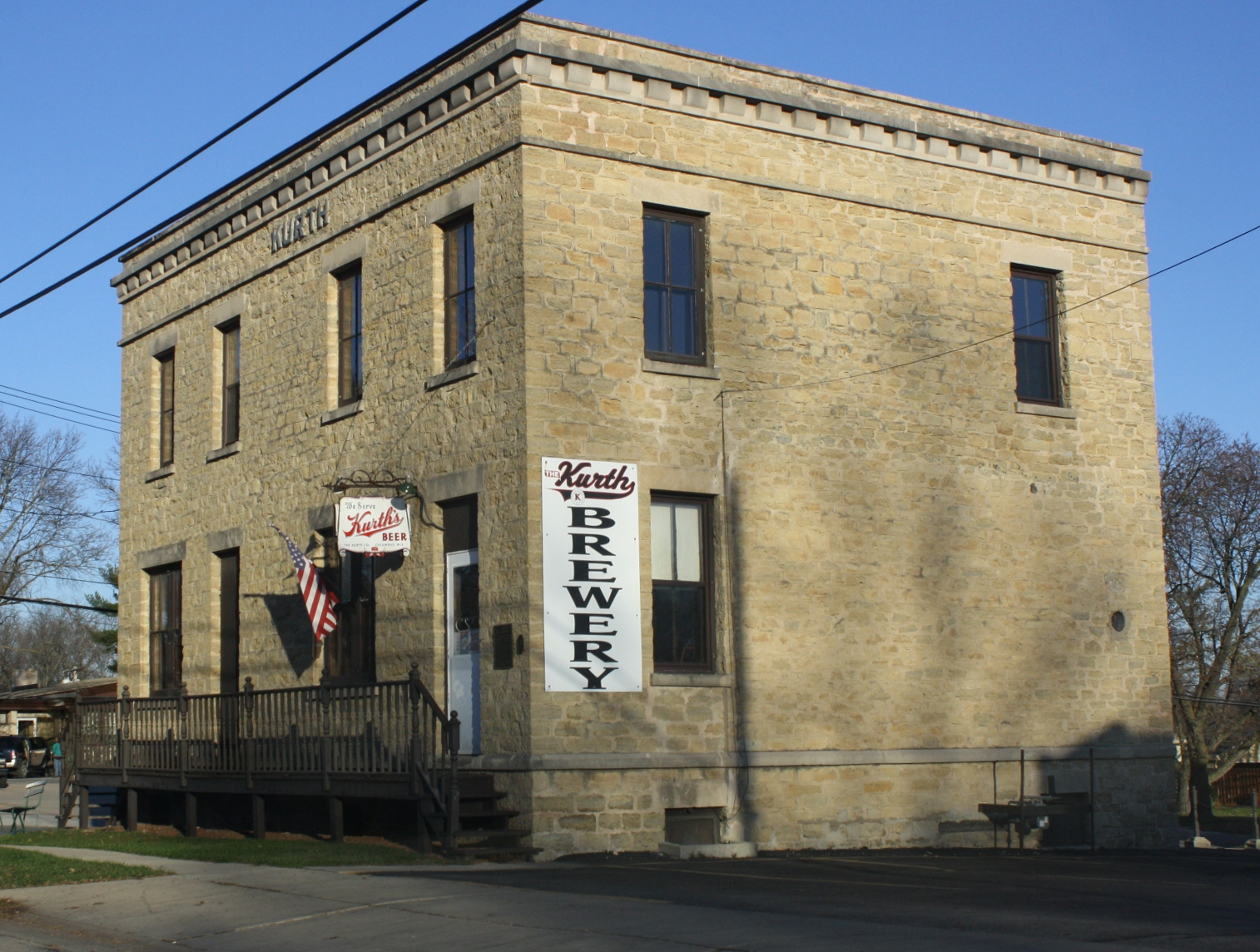
- South side of Kurth Brewery

- Location within Wisconsin Location within the United States
- Location: 729--733 Park Ave., Columbus, Wisconsin
- Coordinates: 43°20′0″N 89°1′13″W
- Area: less than one acre
- Built: 1902
- Architectural style: Late 19th And 20th Century Revivals
- NRHP reference No.: 93001359
- Added to NRHP: December 2, 1993

Kurth Brewery was located in Columbus, Wisconsin and operated from 1859 to 1949. In 1914, it was producing about 100 barrels of beer a day, making it one of the largest breweries in southern Wisconsin. A fire destroyed the malting buildings in 1916; however, the hospitality bar remains today at the corner of Park Avenue and Farnham Street and is open Wednesday and Friday nights. The brewery is still owned by the Kurth family.

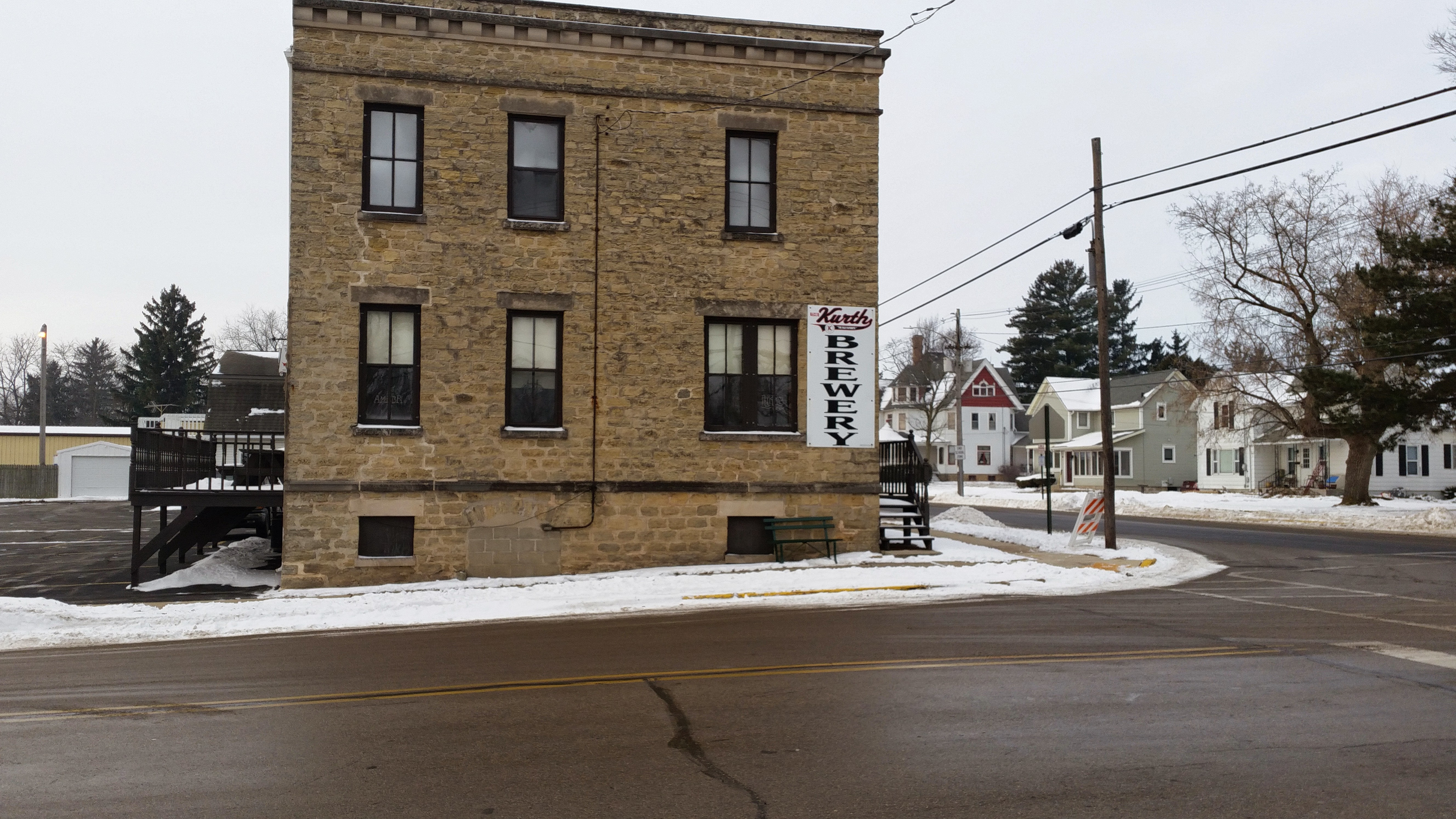
North face

The Kurth Brewery is listed on the National Register of Historic Places.
