= Columbus Downtown Historic District =

Historic district in Wisconsin, United States

- U.S. National Register of Historic Places
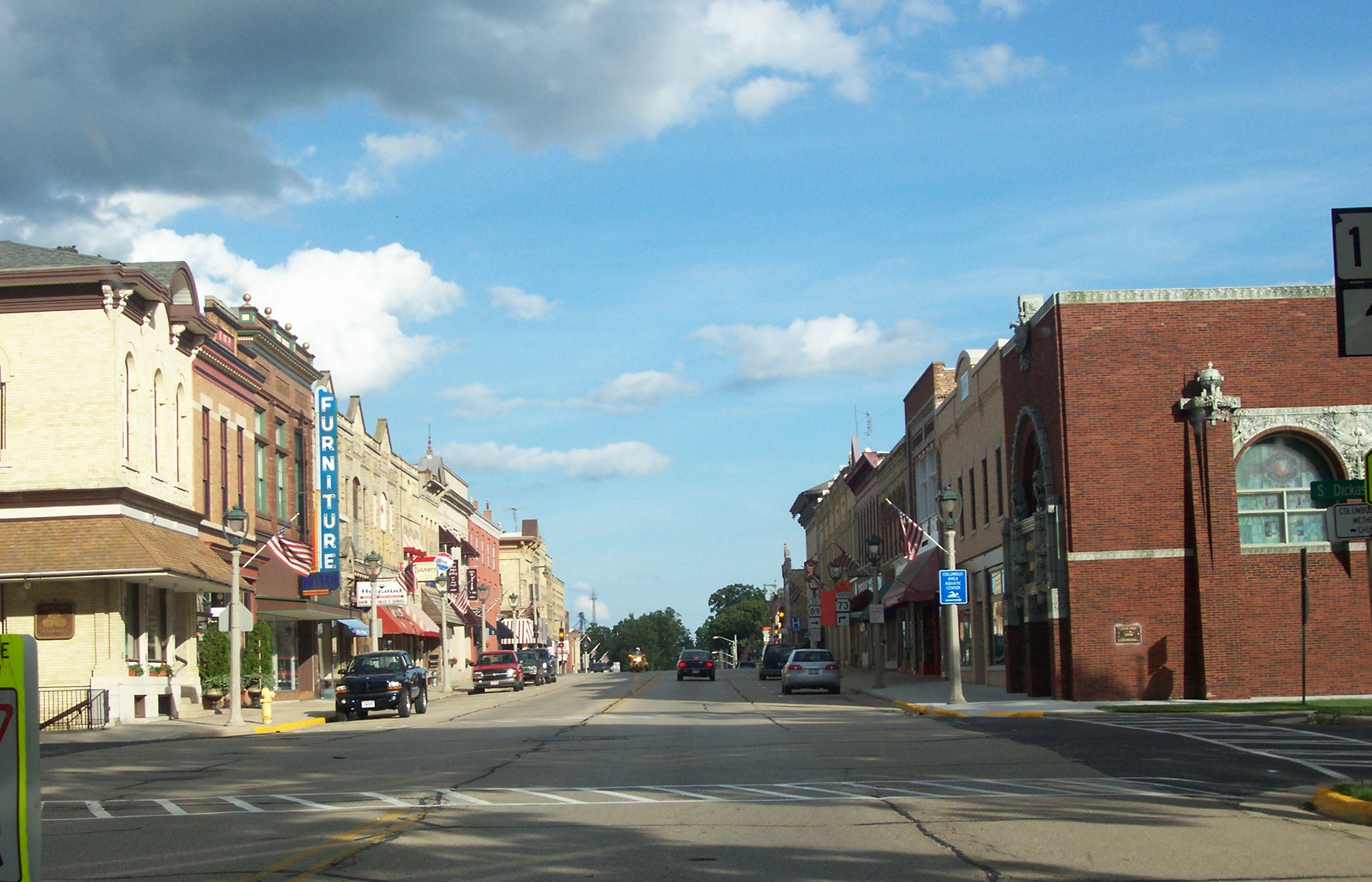
- A portion of the district.
- Location: Roughly bounded by Mill, Water and Harrison Sts. and Dickason Blvd., Columbus, Wisconsin
- Area: 11 acres (4.5 ha)
- NRHP reference No.: 92000113
- Added to NRHP: March 5, 1992

The Columbus Downtown Historic District is located in Columbus, Wisconsin.

== History ==
The district is the old commercial heart of town around the junction of Dickason Blvd and James St, including many cream brick buildings built by Richard Vanaken and Henry Boelte. Notable buildings include the 1852 Corner Drug, the 1858 Italianate Whitney Hotel, the 1865 First National Bank (restyled Neoclassical in 1916), the 1892 Richardsonian Romanesque Hotel Tremont, and the 1903 Bonnett's Millinery Shop.

The district includes the work of Louis Sullivan. It was featured in the 2009 film Public Enemies.

== Gallery ==
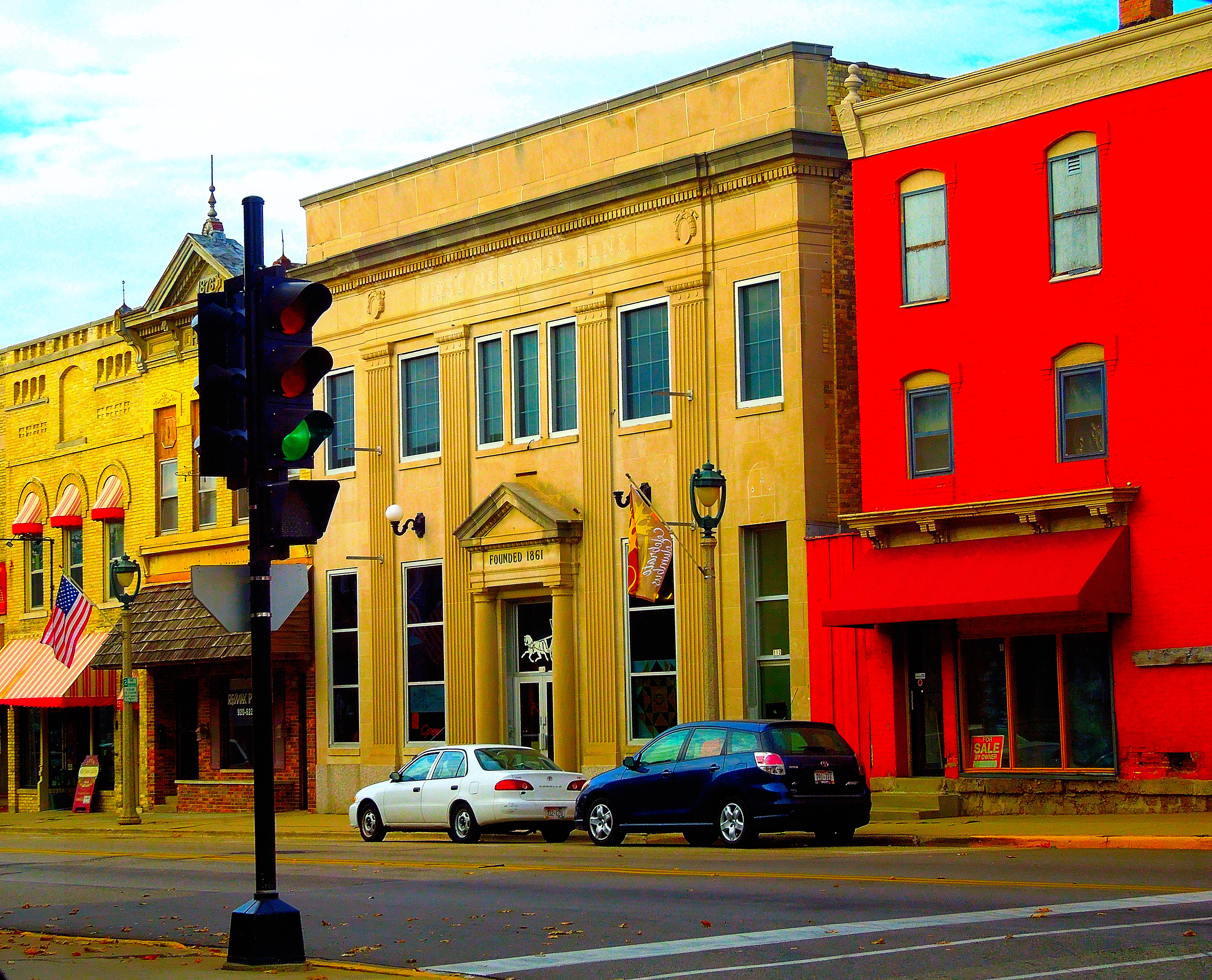
First National Bank Building

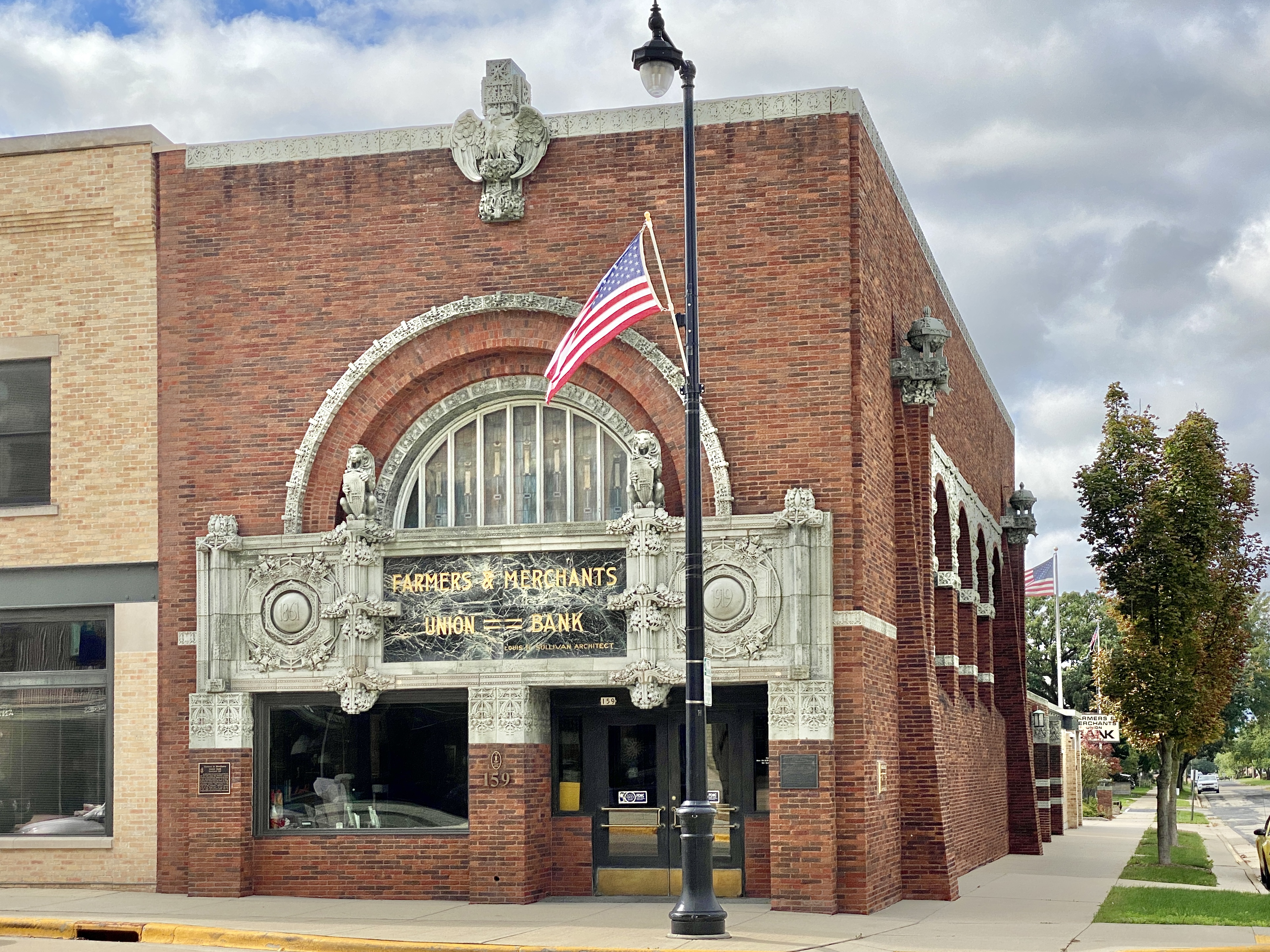
Farmers and Merchants Union Bank

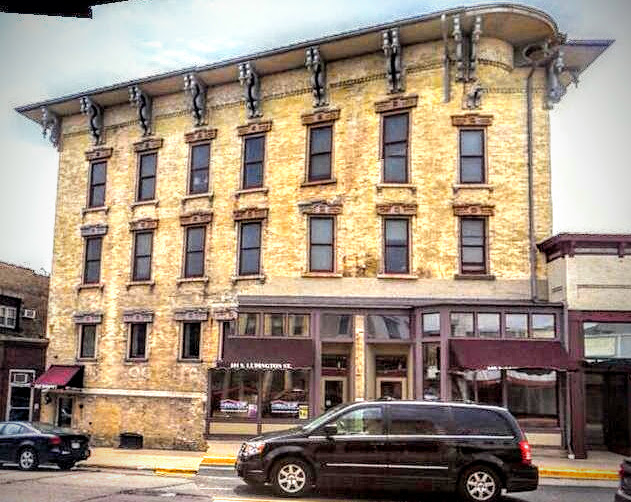
Whitney Hotel

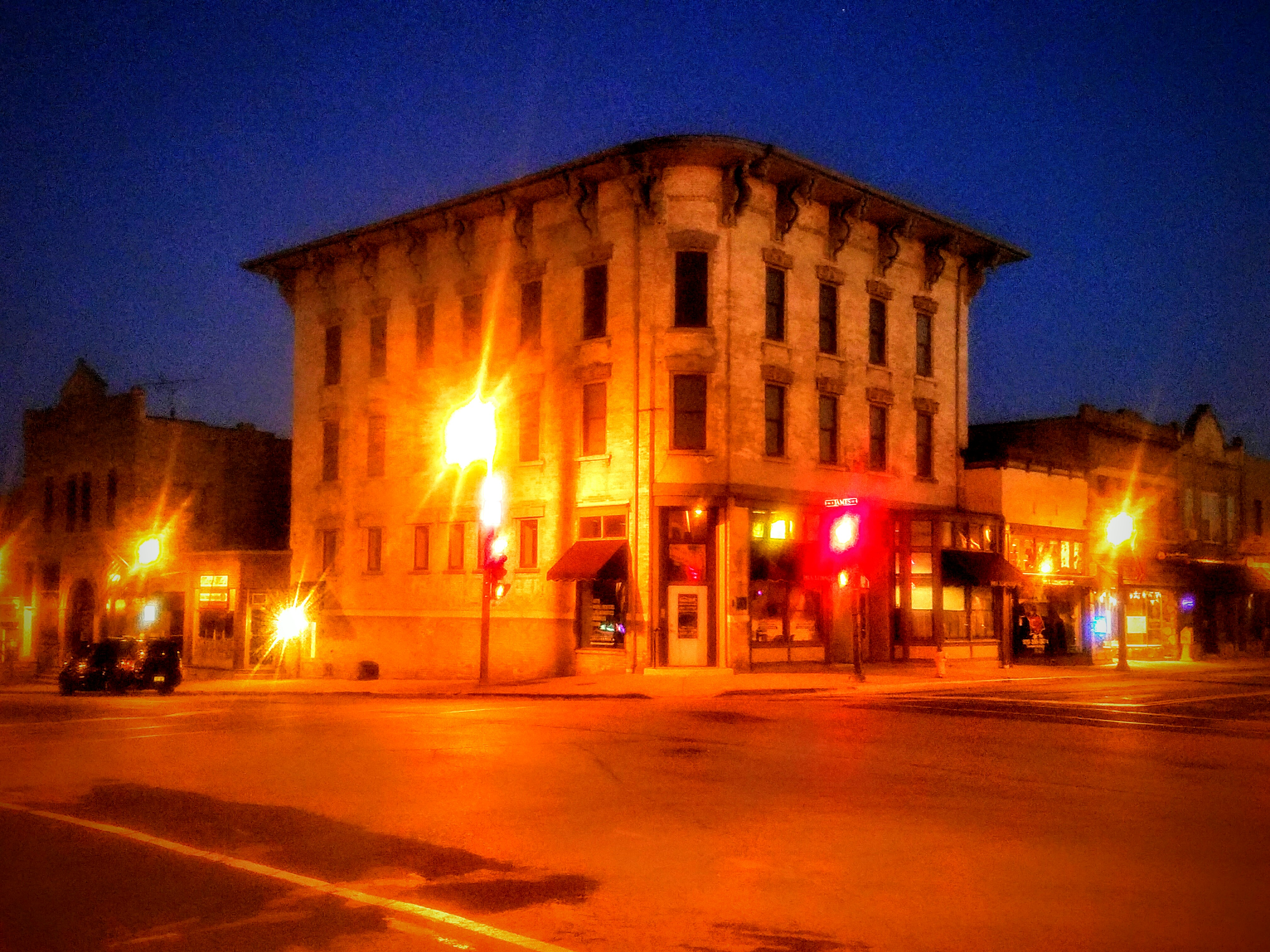
Whitney Building
