= National Register of Historic Places listings in Columbia County, Wisconsin =

Location of Columbia County in Wisconsin

This is a list of the National Register of Historic Places listings in Columbia County, Wisconsin. This is intended to be a complete list of the properties and districts on the National Register of Historic Places in Columbia County, Wisconsin, United States. Latitude and longitude coordinates are provided for many National Register properties and districts; these locations may be seen together in a map. There are 56 properties and districts listed on the National Register in the county.

This National Park Service list is complete through NPS recent listings posted November 13, 2026.

== Current listings ==
	Name on the Register	Image	Date listed	Location	City or town	Description
1	E. Clarke and Julia Arnold House	E. Clarke and Julia Arnold House	April 12, 2007 (#07000339)	954 Dix St. 43°20′11″N 89°01′46″W	Columbus	A Frank Lloyd Wright-designed Usonian home built in 1955 overlooking farmlands to the west. The house was originally designed with a V-shaped floor plan, but when the Arnolds had twins, Wright approved the addition of a third wing, making the house a Y.
2	Clara F. Bacon House	Clara F. Bacon House	January 14, 2009 (#08001328)	509 Madison Ave. 43°18′37″N 89°31′28″W	Lodi	1899 Queen Anne home with decorated bargeboards and interesting shingle patterns, still well-preserved. Clara was the wife of a Baraboo businessman, but returned to Lodi to build this house after her husband died.
3	Albert M. and Alice Bellack House	Albert M. and Alice Bellack House	June 7, 2010 (#10000318)	628 W. James St. 43°20′31″N 89°01′13″W	Columbus	Columbus's only Mission style house was originally built in Queen Anne style in 1897, then restyled to Mission in the 1920s, after the Bellacks traveled to the southwest. Albert ran a men's clothes store and tailor business and helped organize the Columbus Canning Company.
4	Bellmont Hotel	Bellmont Hotel	November 4, 1993 (#93001170)	120 N. Main St. 43°32′12″N 89°18′00″W	Pardeeville	Three-story concrete-block hotel with a full-width porch, built near the CM&SP depot in 1909, designed by Charles Williams of Portage and built by the Neck brothers of Montello. Now a museum.
5	H. H. Bennett Studio	H. H. Bennett Studio	October 8, 1976 (#76000054)	215 Broadway; 43°37′41″N 89°46′28″W	Wisconsin Dells	Studio of H. H. Bennett, whose photographs in the late 1800s popularized the Dells. Possibly the oldest functioning photography studio in the U.S. Now a museum open to the public.
6	Bowman House	Bowman House	April 3, 1986 (#86000621)	714 Broadway St. 43°37′38″N 89°46′02″W	Wisconsin Dells	Prairie School house built in 1904 for Abram Bowman, son of an early Kilbourn lawyer, banker and legislator. From 1934 to 1977, it hosted vacations for older working women. Now it houses a historical museum.
7	Daniel and Nellie Byrns House	Daniel and Nellie Byrns House	October 16, 2008 (#08001000)	221 Mill St. 43°18′40″N 89°31′49″W	Lodi	Highly intact bungalow built in 1915 for the Byrns. They were immigrants from Ireland who farmed nearby, then ran a grocery store in Lodi.
8	F. A. Chadbourn House	F. A. Chadbourn House	December 28, 1990 (#90001961)	314 S. Charles St. 43°20′28″N 89°01′24″W	Columbus	Wood-sided Tudor Revival home and carriage house, designed by Van Ryn & DeGelleke and built in 1900. F.A. and his family were involved in the First National Bank of Columbus, and Chadbourns built four nearby houses.
9	Church Hill Historic District	Church Hill Historic District	January 25, 1997 (#96001628)	Roughly bounded by Adams, Pleasant, Lock, and Franklin Sts. 43°32′32″N 89°27′43″W	Portage	Early neighborhood just north of the downtown, around five prominent churches. Examples of different styles include the 1855 Greek Revival Methodist Episcopal Church, the 1876 Gothic Revival Fulton house, the 1883 Italianate Thomson house, the 1873 Second Empire Smith house, the 1904 Queen Anne Porter house, the 1917 American Foursquare Slinger house, and the 1925 Zimmerman bungalow.
10	Columbus City Hall	Columbus City Hall	September 4, 1979 (#79000065)	105 N. Dickason St. 43°20′15″N 89°00′56″W	Columbus	Richardsonian Romanesque cream brick municipal building with a bell and clock tower, designed by Truman D. Allen of Minneapolis and built 1891-92.
11	Columbus Downtown Historic District	Columbus Downtown Historic District	March 5, 1992 (#92000113)	Roughly bounded by Mill, Water and Harrison Sts. and Dickason Blvd. 43°20′19″N 89°00′54″W	Columbus	The old commercial heart of town around the junction of Dickason Blvd and James St, including many cream brick buildings built by Richard Vanaken and Henry Boelte. Notable buildings include the 1852 Corner Drug, the 1858 Italianate Whitney Hotel, the 1865 First National Bank (restyled Neoclassical in 1916), the 1892 Richardsonian Romanesque Hotel Tremont, and the 1903 Bonnett's Millinery Shop. Also the City Hall, library, and Farmers and Merchants Bank, which are described separately on this page. Columbus, Wisconsin
12	Columbus Fireman's Park Complex	Columbus Fireman's Park Complex	February 25, 2004 (#04000106)	1049 Park Ave. 43°19′48″N 89°01′24″W	Columbus	Wooden pavilion built in 1917 at which the volunteer firemen chaperoned wholesome dances, and Rest Haven, a free convenience stop for early motorists built in 1923.
13	Columbus Post Office	Columbus Post Office	October 24, 2000 (#00001250)	211 S. Dickason Blvd. 43°20′16″N 89°00′59″W	Columbus	Art Moderne post office built in 1938 with help from the Public Works Administration, containing a mural painted by Arnold Branch.
14	Columbus Public Library	Columbus Public Library	November 15, 1990 (#90001704)	112 S. Dickason Blvd. 43°20′20″N 89°00′58″W	Columbus	Smallish Carnegie library designed by Claude and Starck in a cottage-like Prairie Style and built in 1912.
15	Angie Williams Cox Library	Angie Williams Cox Library	November 15, 1990 (#90001703)	129 N. Main St. 43°32′13″N 89°18′02″W	Pardeeville	Built as an Odd Fellows lodge around 1900, the building was bought by Cox and renovated in 1934 with a Georgian Revival front designed by Leon Stanhope. Cox was a Pardeeville philanthropist whose husband made a fortune in chewing gum.
16	Dix Street-Warner Street Historic District	Dix Street-Warner Street Historic District	August 7, 2017 (#100001444)	Roughly bounded by Maple Ave., Dix, Hibbard, Warner, Fuller & S. Charles Sts. 43°20′23″N 89°01′32″W	Columbus	Neighborhood of mid-century homes built from 1941 to 1970.
16	Durward's Glen	Durward's Glen	November 7, 1978 (#78000081)	NE of Merrimac off WI 78; 43°26′12″N 89°35′37″W	Merrimac	Ravine along the Wisconsin River in which frontier painter and poet Bernard Durward and his family settled in 1862, building a cabin, a chapel, studios, and Stations of the Cross, and living a creative, monastic lifestyle.
17	Farmers and Merchants Union Bank	Farmers and Merchants Union Bank	October 18, 1972 (#72000044)	159 W. James St. 43°20′19″N 89°00′55″W	Columbus	Small bank building with terra cotta ornamentation, designed by Louis Sullivan and built in 1919, the eighth and last of his "jewel-box banks."
18	Fred and Lucia Farnham House	Fred and Lucia Farnham House	July 30, 2009 (#09000580)	553 W. James St. 43°20′32″N 89°01′14″W	Columbus	Fine brick-clad Italianate house built in 1867. Fred operated a store, grain elevator, and lumber yard in Columbus with his brother-in-law.
19	Fort Winnebago Site	Fort Winnebago Site	May 17, 1979 (#79000066)	Address Restricted	Portage	From 1828 to 1845, the one US Army fort in the wilderness between Green Bay and Prairie du Chien, positioned to keep peace with the Indians, to control the portage between the Fox and Wisconsin rivers, and to encourage settlement around the portage. Jefferson Davis was stationed here.
20	Fort Winnebago Surgeon's Quarters	Fort Winnebago Surgeon's Quarters	October 28, 1970 (#70000029)	0.1 mi. South of corporate city limits on WI 33; 43°33′15″N 89°25′58″W	Portage	House of hand-hewn logs built as a fur trader's home between 1818 and 1828, then used as a sutler's store. Trim boards were probably added in 1834 when it was upgraded to house Fort Winnebago's surgeon. Now a museum, restored to its state of 1834.
21	Fox-Wisconsin Portage Site	Fox-Wisconsin Portage Site	March 14, 1973 (#73000074)	Address Restricted	Portage	2 mile crossing from the upper Fox river to the Wisconsin and Mississippi, used by native Americans, French fur traders, Marquette and Jolliet, and British soldiers, before there were roads or railroads through Wisconsin.
22	Zona Gale House	Zona Gale House	October 24, 1980 (#80000113)	506 W. Edgewater St. 43°32′15″N 89°28′03″W	Portage	Grand Neoclassical home which Portage author Zona Gale had built in 1906 for her parents and for herself, with her writing desk facing the Wisconsin River.
23	Goeres Park	Goeres Park	April 9, 2009 (#09000197)	101 Fair St. 43°19′21″N 89°31′51″W	Lodi	8 acre landscaped park in the bottom along Spring Creek. Mostly designed by Franz Aust and his students from UW-Madison, with work from 1937 to '42 funded by the WPA and otherwise by the community. Named for T. O. Goeres, Lodi dentist, head of the Lodi Canning Company, and civic leader.
24	George Griswold House	George Griswold House	July 1, 2009 (#09000487)	146 S. Dickason Blvd. 43°20′19″N 89°00′58″W	Columbus	Griswold had trained to be a lawyer in New York, but when his eyesight failed he came to Columbus at age 34 and opened a mercantile firm in 1850. After some success, in 1857-58 he built this house, designed by Columbus architect E.D. Baldwin in Italianate style. Now a funeral home.
25	Holsten Family Farmstead	Holsten Family Farmstead	September 8, 1992 (#92001189)	W1391 Weiner Rd. 43°17′24″N 89°04′06″W	Columbus	Farm includes an 1889 cream-brick Italianate farmhouse with Gothic details, an earlier Greek Revival home which has been converted to a granary, a barn with part built pre-1876, a corn crib, chicken coops, other sheds, orchard and gardens. The Holstens helped organize the Springbrook creamery and ice house in 1885, the Columbus Poultry Assoc. in the 1920s, and other community efforts.
26	Adolphus and Sarah Ingalsbe House	Adolphus and Sarah Ingalsbe House	July 1, 2009 (#09000488)	546 Park Ave. 43°20′04″N 89°01′09″W	Columbus	After spending 3 years in the 1849 California Gold Rush, Adolphus moved to Columbus to become the town's largest farm land owner and stock breeder. In 1853 he had the first part of this Italianate home built and in 1875 the rest.
27	John A. and Maggie Jones House	John A. and Maggie Jones House	July 30, 2009 (#09000581)	307 N. Ludington St. 43°20′24″N 89°00′46″W	Columbus	Fine 2.5 story Queen Anne style house, built in 1900. John was a Columbus druggist.
28	Kilbourn Public Library	Kilbourn Public Library	December 27, 1974 (#74000061)	429 Broadway; 43°37′41″N 89°46′15″W	Wisconsin Dells	Small Carnegie library designed by Claude & Starck in Prairie Style with Arts and Crafts details and built in 1912.
29	Kingsley Bend Mound Group	Kingsley Bend Mound Group	August 20, 1998 (#98001088)	3 miles SE of Wisconsin Dells on Wis. Hwy. 16; 43°36′05″N 89°42′41″W	Wisconsin Dells	Native American mounds including a water spirit effigy, a bird effigy, and several animals. Boundary increase July 22, 2010.
30	John H. Kurth and Company Office Building	John H. Kurth and Company Office Building	December 2, 1993 (#93001359)	729-733 Park Ave. 43°20′00″N 89°01′13″W	Columbus	Kurth was a German immigrant who came to Columbus around 1860 to brew beer from locally grown barley and hops. The brewery expanded and built this two-story limestone office building in 1902. Today that office is all that remains of the larger complex. See: Kurth Brewery.
31	Frank T. and Polly Lewis House	Frank T. and Polly Lewis House	January 14, 2009 (#08001329)	509 N. Main St. 43°18′59″N 89°31′43″W	Lodi	Fine Queen Anne home on a bluff above Spring Creek, designed and built by Carl C. Menes of Lodi in 1901-02. Frank was a house painter and Polly ran a millinery shop in town.
32	Gov. James T. Lewis House	Gov. James T. Lewis House	April 9, 1982 (#82000644)	711 W. James St. 43°20′32″N 89°01′17″W	Columbus	Cream-brick Italianate home with bracketed eaves and cupola, built 1854-56 by James T. Lewis, who would be Governor at the end of the Civil War. Bought in 1917 by Fred Stare, head of the Columbus Canning Company and for two years president of the National Canners Association.
33	Lodi School Hillside Improvement Site	Lodi School Hillside Improvement Site	April 9, 2009 (#09000198)	Corner Street, bounded by Pleasant Street and Columbus Street; 43°18′40″N 89°31′30″W	Lodi	After the Lodi millpond was drained in 1926, this little valley was left a marsh with barren hillsides. Aiming for a nicer entrance to town, the people terraced the hillside and cleaned up Spring Creek, with design assistance from Franz Aust, the first Professor of Landscape Architecture at UW-Madison, and with money from the CWA.
34	Lodi Street-Prairie Street Historic District	Lodi Street-Prairie Street Historic District	June 22, 2000 (#00000735)	Roughly Prairie St. from Second St. to Mill St. 43°18′48″N 89°31′42″W	Lodi	Residential neighborhood including the 1855 Italianate McCloud house, the 1874 Greek Revival Hinds house, the commercial vernacular Clements House hotel, the 1897 Queen Anne Seville house, and the 1915 Posta bungalow.
35	Henry Merrell House	Henry Merrell House	July 8, 1993 (#93000545)	505 E. Cook St. 43°32′34″N 89°27′13″W	Portage	Residence of Henry Merrill (also spelled Merrell), sutler and postmaster for Fort Winnebago along the Portage Canal. Built 1835 to 1839 in Greek Revival style, originally across the canal from the fort.
36	Merrimac Ferry	Merrimac Ferry	December 31, 1974 (#74000330)	WI 113 at the Wisconsin River; 43°22′05″N 89°37′26″W	Merrimac	In 1844 Chester Mattson started an overhead-cable ferry at this site. Since 1933 the Wisconsin DOT has provided the ferry service for free, and it's now the only ferry left in the state highway system.
37	Job Mills Block	Job Mills Block	November 26, 2008 (#08001115)	109-111 S. Main St. 43°18′44″N 89°31′31″W	Lodi	2-story brick and brownstone commercial building with Richardsonian Romanesque touches, built in 1895 and added to in 1901, 1919 and 1930. Job Mills was a local farmer, businessman and postmaster. Initially, E.J. Cain's jewelry store and the Lodi Post Office occupied the first floor and apartments the second.
38	Richard W. and Margaret Mills House	Richard W. and Margaret Mills House	February 18, 2009 (#09000048)	104 Grand Ave. 43°18′45″N 89°31′56″W	Lodi	"Very fine and very intact" Queen Anne-styled house built in 1895-96. Richard was a grain dealer, in business with his brother Job and his uncle.
39	Nashold 20-sided Barn	Nashold 20-sided Barn	February 11, 1988 (#88000091)	Trunk Z, 0.4 mi. E of WI 146; 43°25′44″N 89°05′15″W	Fall River	20-sided roundish barn built around a 40.5 foot center silo, with space for 24 cows, a bull, calves and 5 horses, and with a milkhouse tucked under the ramp that leads to the hayloft. Built in 1911, toward the end of the round-barn era, which ran from 1880 to 1920.
40	Old Indian Agency House	Old Indian Agency House	February 1, 1972 (#72000045)	1490 Agency House Rd. 43°33′33″N 89°26′14″W	Portage	Federal-style house built in 1832 for John Kinzie, Indian subagent to the Winnebagos, and his wife Juliet. Now a museum, it is one of the finest and oldest surviving frame buildings in Wisconsin.
41	Pardeeville Presbyterian Church	Pardeeville Presbyterian Church	January 15, 1980 (#80000114)	105 S. Main St. 43°32′07″N 89°18′04″W	Pardeeville	1864 Greek Revival church with a spire and low-pitched roof, a style unusual for Wisconsin, sited on land donated by John Pardee.
42	Portage Canal	Portage Canal	August 26, 1977 (#77000030)	Between Fox and Wisconsin Rivers; 43°32′49″N 89°26′39″W	Portage	2.1 mile canal connecting the Fox and Wisconsin rivers, begun in 1835. Developers saw the Fox–Wisconsin Waterway as an artery of commerce connecting the Saint Lawrence Seaway (eastern U.S.) with the Mississippi (west), but it never really succeeded.
43	Portage Industrial Waterfront Historic District	Portage Industrial Waterfront Historic District	March 17, 1995 (#95000257)	Jct. of E. Mullet and Dodge Sts. 43°32′20″N 89°27′24″W	Portage	Six commercial buildings in the low-lying area along the Portage Canal: the 1862 Wentworth Grain Elevator, the 1881 Portage Hosiery complex, the 1891 Portage Iron Works, the 1916 T.H. Cochrane Company Warehouse, and the 1920 Hyland Garage.
44	Portage Retail Historic District	Portage Retail Historic District	April 27, 1995 (#95000510)	Roughly, Cook from Wisconsin to Main, Wisconsin from Cook to Edgewater and DeWitt from Conant to Edgewater; 43°32′23″N 89°27′36″W	Portage	Business district on the hillside NW of the canal including the 1866 Italianate City Brewery, the 1873 Italianate Graham Drug Company, the 1881 Italianate Williams Shoes and Harness shop, the 1889 Queen Anne Hillyer Block (which housed the High Priced Grocery), the 1891 3-story Italianate Beattie Block, the 1927 Georgian Revival Portage Theater, the 1927 Ram Hotel, and the 1929 Art Deco City Bank of Portage.
45	Portage Street Historic District	Portage Street Historic District	June 2, 2000 (#00000626)	Roughly along Portage St. form Spring to Parr Sts. 43°18′53″N 89°31′29″W	Lodi	Mostly homes of businessmen within walking distance of downtown, including the 1873 Gothic Revival Universalist Church, the pre-1882 gabled-ell cum Queen Anne Watson house, the 1885 Queen Anne Everson house, and the 1922 Searles bungalow.
46	Prairie Street Historic District	Prairie Street Historic District	January 7, 1999 (#98001586)	Roughly along W. Prairie St., including parts of S. Lewis St. and S. Charles St. 43°20′23″N 89°01′22″W	Columbus	Diverse residential district including the 1860 gabled ell Reuben Chadbourn house, 1874 Italianate Sawyer house, the 1877 Stick style Sexton house, the 1877 Gothic Revival/Second Empire Olivet Congregational Church, the 1897 Queen Anne Andrews house, the 1920 Craftsman Olivet Parsonage, the 1926 Colonial Revival Goffin house, and the 1928 Georgian Revival Reuben Chadbourn house.
47	Joel M. Pruyn Block	Joel M. Pruyn Block	October 14, 2008 (#08001001)	146 S. Main St. 43°18′45″N 89°31′32″W	Lodi	Remarkably intact 1-story brick store with Romanesque Revival stylings, built in 1881 by Joel Pruyn (grocer and butcher) for his son Joel M.'s grocery store. Later housed a butcher shop, then the Lodi Enterprise newspaper.
48	John A. and Martha Robertson House	John A. and Martha Robertson House	January 22, 2009 (#08001370)	456 Seminary St. 43°18′56″N 89°32′01″W	Lodi	Large, elaborate Queen Anne home with an unusual porch turret, designed by Frank L. Lindsay of Portage and built in 1897.
49	Reinhard and Amelia Schendel House	Reinhard and Amelia Schendel House	June 7, 2010 (#10000319)	211 North Ludington St. 43°20′21″N 89°00′49″W	Columbus	Very intact 2.5-story Queen Anne home built in 1894, decorated with various patterns of wood shingles, including hearts, clubs, spades and diamonds. Reinhard was a Prussian immigrant who succeeded as a lumber dealer in Columbus.
50	Frances Kurth Sharrow House	Frances Kurth Sharrow House	July 8, 2010 (#10000436)	841 Park Ave. 43°19′57″N 89°01′19″W	Columbus	Finest Prairie style house in Columbus, built in 1916-17 from plans by Walter J. Keith. Brewer John Kurth had the house built as a wedding present for his daughter Frances, who married Lloyd Sharrow, pharmacist and later mayor of Columbus.
51	Society Hill Historic District	Society Hill Historic District	March 5, 1992 (#92000112)	Roughly bounded by W. Wisconsin, Cass and W. Emmett Sts. and MacFarlane Rd. 43°32′34″N 89°28′01″W	Portage	Large residential district where many prominent families of Portage have lived, including the 1855 Greek Revival Corning-Clark house, the 1855 Italianate/Gothic Revival Jurgens house, the 1877 Second Empire Cochrane house, the 1881 Italianate Reed house, the 1881 Italianate/Classical Revival house where Frederick Jackson Turner lived as a boy, the 1892 Queen Anne McDuffie house, and the 1920 Krause bungalow.
52	South Dickason Boulevard Residential Historic District	South Dickason Boulevard Residential Historic District	March 4, 1999 (#99000240)	Roughly along S. Dickason Blvd., from W. School St. to W. Harrison, also along S. Ludington St. 43°20′14″N 89°01′03″W	Columbus	Small district includes the early 1860s Greek Revival-remodeled-as-Queen Anne Long/Baker house, the 1868 Italianate Manning house, the 1900 Queen Anne Wright house, the 1921 Craftsman Fritz house, and the 1930 Norman Revival Albrecht house.
53	Wawbeek-Horace A.J. Upham House	Wawbeek-Horace A.J. Upham House	June 19, 1985 (#85001355)	WI 13; 43°38′16″N 89°45′34″W	Wisconsin Dells	Shingle-style summer home complete with turret, on a hill outside Wisconsin Dells, designed by Eschweiler and built in 1899 for Upham, a Milwaukee lawyer. In 1938 the Uphams donated the property to Wisconsin Easter Seals, which now uses it as Camp Wawbeek, for children with disabilities.
54	Jacob Weber House	Jacob Weber House	January 20, 1978 (#78000083)	825 Oak St. 43°37′44″N 89°46′27″W	Wisconsin Dells	Greek Revival home built in 1863 by Weber, first postmaster of Kilbourn City. H. H. Bennett bought the house in 1891 and his family lived there until 1971.
55	Zion Evangelical Lutheran Church and Parsonage	Zion Evangelical Lutheran Church and Parsonage	July 8, 2009 (#09000509)	236 and 254 W. Mill St. 43°20′24″N 89°00′55″W	Columbus	Cream brick High Victorian Gothic church with 125-foot steeple designed by E. Townsend Mix and built in 1878, with Italianate parsonage built in 1885.

== See also ==
- List of National Historic Landmarks in Wisconsin
- National Register of Historic Places listings in Wisconsin
- Listings in neighboring counties: Adams, Dane, Dodge, Green Lake, Juneau, Marquette, Sauk
