= Church Hill Historic District =

Church Hill Historic District may refer to:

- Church Hill Historic District (New Canaan, Connecticut), listed on the National Register of Historic Places in Fairfield County, Connecticut
- Church Hill Historic District (Portage, Wisconsin), listed on the National Register of Historic Places in Columbia County, Wisconsin
