= Richard C. Smith House =

Historic house in Wisconsin, United States

- U.S. National Register of Historic Places
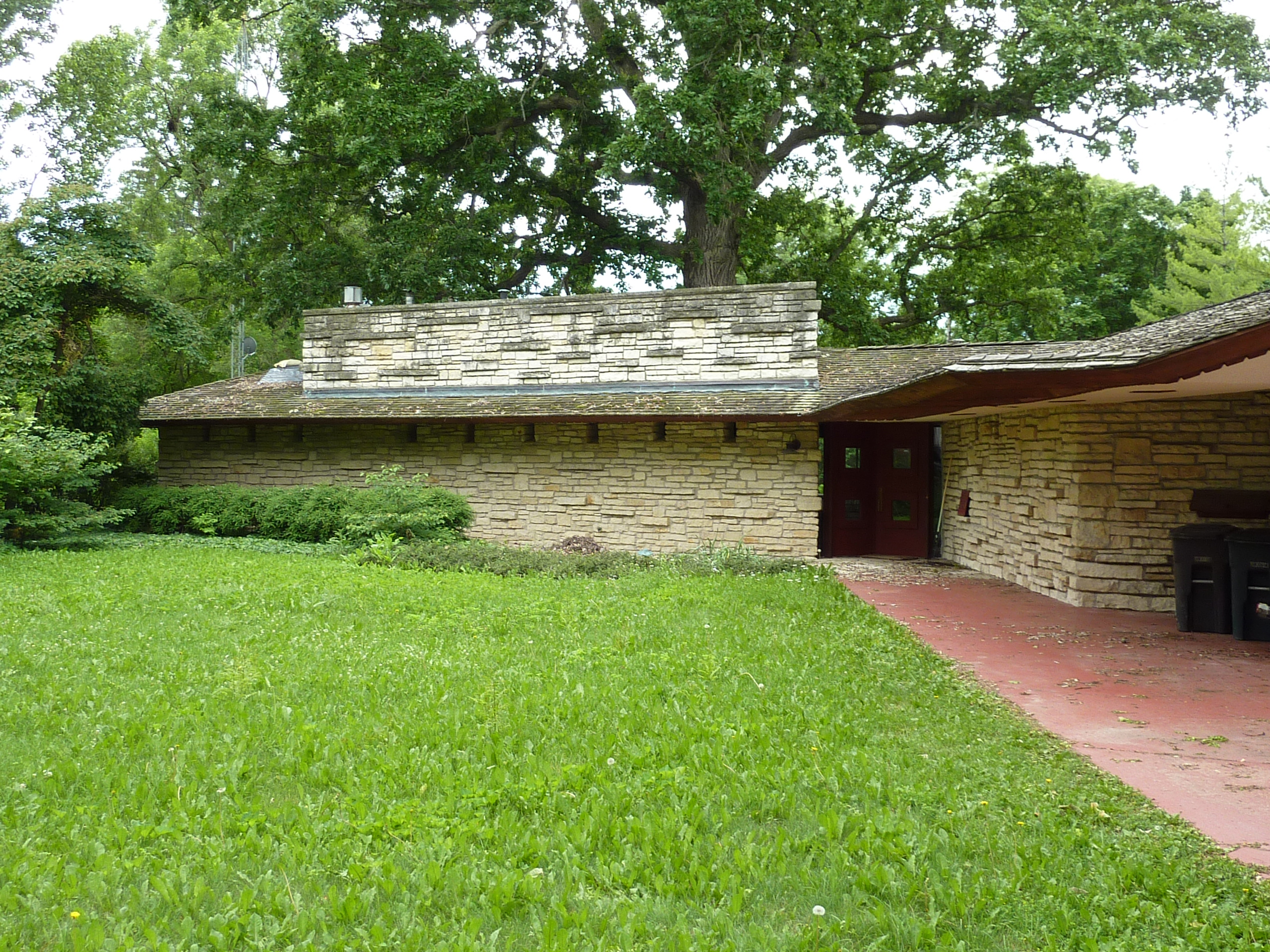
- The Richard C. Smith House

- Location within Wisconsin
- Location: Jefferson, Wisconsin
- Coordinates: 43°0′8″N 88°48′7″W
- Built: 1950
- Architect: Frank Lloyd Wright
- Architectural style: Usonian
- NRHP reference No.: 79000338
- Added to NRHP: April 19, 1979

The Richard C. Smith House is a small Usonian home designed by Frank Lloyd Wright and constructed in Jefferson, Wisconsin in 1950. It is one of Wright's diamond module homes, a form he used in the Patrick and Margaret Kinney House, the E. Clarke and Julia Arnold House and a number of other homes he designed in the late 1940s and early 1950s.

The house is one-story, with a lowercase "h"-shaped floor plan composed of diamond-shaped units, where the bottom legs of the h enclose a private terrace around a huge old oak. The north side of the house toward the road is mostly coursed limestone, giving privacy, and left rough to suggest a natural outcropping. The south side, facing the terrace and golf course, has many windows. The diamond element repeats throughout, in piercings in the eaves and in the drawers in the bedrooms.

Wright seems to have started the design at the huge oak which was already on the lot. His blueprints show that he drew an imaginary triangle around the tree, then oriented the diamonds, terrace and house around it.

The house was a mixed success. The flat roof leaked. The house was either too hot or too cold. The oak tree withered after Wright paved over its roots. The house cost almost twice what Wright had estimated. Yet the NRHP nomination concludes: "The Smith House is no pale imitation of earlier Usonian or Prairie School houses. It is the result of a natural and vital design evolution still underway in the mind of one of the world's greatest architects."

== See also ==
- List of Frank Lloyd Wright works
- National Register of Historic Places listings in Jefferson County, Wisconsin
