= E. Clarke and Julia Arnold House =

Historic house in Wisconsin, United States

- U.S. National Register of Historic Places
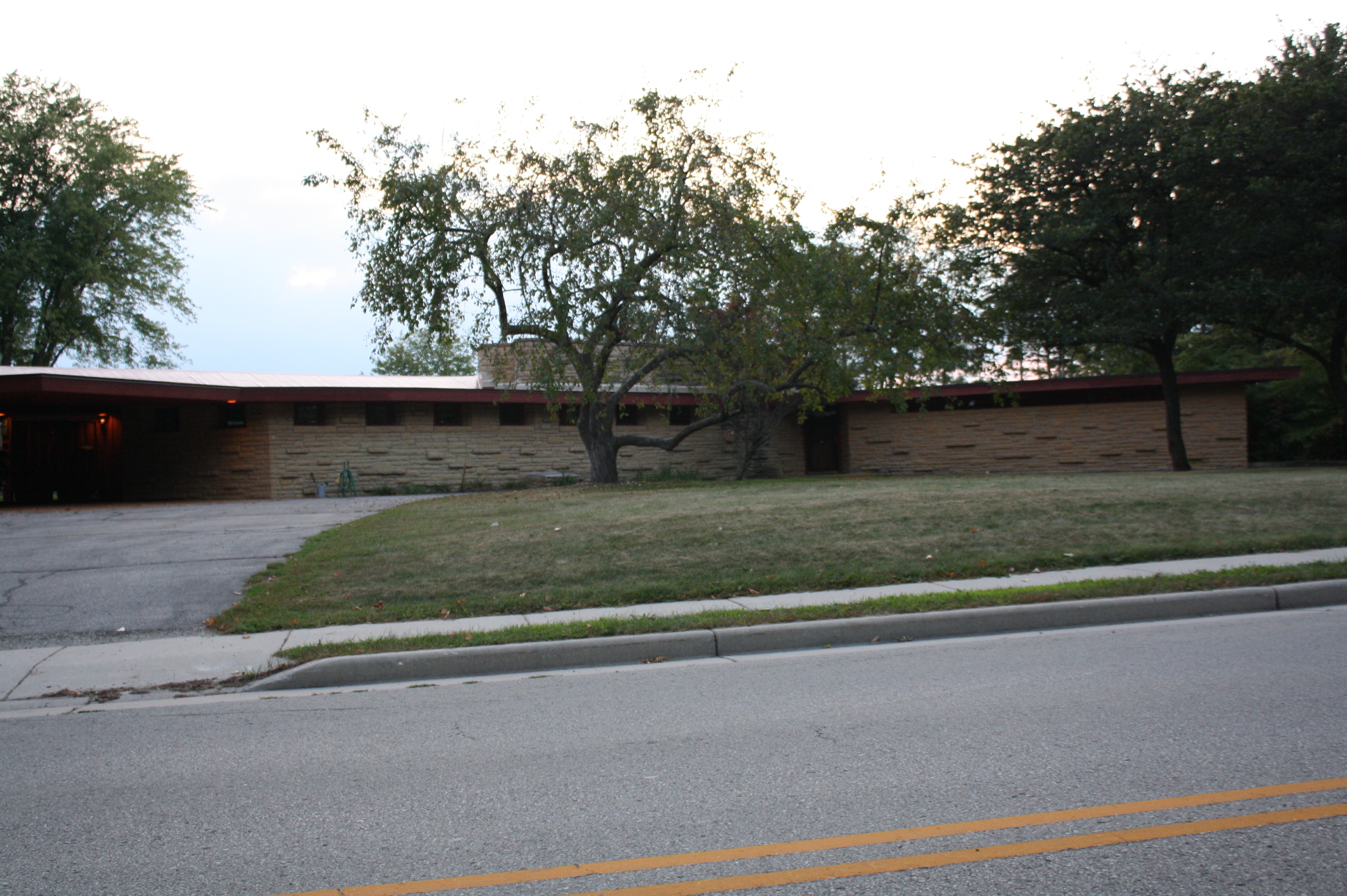

- Location within Wisconsin Location within the United States
- Location: 954 Dix St., Columbus, Wisconsin, United States
- Coordinates: 43°20′11.11″N 89°1′46.6″W
- Area: less than one acre
- Built: 1955-1956
- Architect: Frank Lloyd Wright
- NRHP reference No.: 07000339
- Added to NRHP: April 12, 2007

The E. Clarke and Julia Arnold House is a Frank Lloyd Wright designed Usonian home in Columbus, Wisconsin, United States.

The Arnold house occupies a large site on the west edge of the city of Columbus and overlooks the farmlands to the west. It was built in 1955-1956 for E. Clarke Arnold, a successful Columbus attorney, his wife, Julia, and their growing family, from a design supplied by Frank Lloyd Wright. The Arnolds, like so many of Wright's clients, came to him for a house of their own after seeing a house he had designed for friends, in this case, for Patrick and Margaret Kinney, whose stone-clad Lancaster, Wisconsin house Wright designed in 1951.

This low one-story home is built of Wisconsin limestone, redwood board and batten, and glass. It is one of Wright's diamond module homes, a form he used in the Patrick and Margaret Kinney House, the Richard Smith House and a number of other homes he designed in the late 1940s and early 1950s. In this design, all the angles are either 60°or 120°, forming equilateral parallelogram modules having 4-foot-long (1.2 m) sides. It was originally built with two wings set at 120° angles which gave the house a V-shaped plan with a living room wing, a bedroom wing, and a central core that contained the fireplace mass, kitchen, and utilities. This home featured a twist on the usual Usonian color scheme with Golden ocher floors instead of the signature "Cherokee Red."

Within three years of completion, the arrival of twins necessitated the construction of a second bedroom wing. Wright approved this wing in 1959 and the plans were in preparation when he died in April of that year. Wright apprentice and Taliesin Fellow John H. "Jack" Howe drafted a second, partly revised design, which established the final Y-shaped plan of the house.

== See also ==
- List of Frank Lloyd Wright works
- National Register of Historic Places listings in Columbia County, Wisconsin
