= Vernon Grant =

American cartoonist (1935–2006)

- Poster for exhibition of Vernon Grant's art.
- Born: Vernon Ethelbert Grant; February 14, 1935 Cambridge, Massachusetts
- Died: July 23, 2006 (aged 71) Cambridge, Massachusetts
- Area: Cartoonist
- Notable works: The Love Rangers

Vernon Ethelbert Grant (February 14, 1935 – July 23, 2006) was a cartoonist who did graphic novels, and is also known for his digest-sized comic book series, The Love Rangers. Usually referred to as Vern Grant, he is often credited as the person who first introduced the visual approach and concepts of Japanese manga into English-language cartooning.

== Biography ==
As a child, Grant began earning money by drawing cartoons for birthday cards. After graduating from Rindge Technical High School in Cambridge, Massachusetts, he studied for one year in Boston at the Vesper George School of Art and then joined the Army in 1958 at the age of 23. While serving in the Army over a decade, he was an infantry officer, eventually being discharged with Captain's rank after two Vietnam tours.

Training in Europe as a supply sergeant, he studied Japanese and French. He received airborne assault and parachute training at Officer Candidate School in Fort Benning, Georgia. In June 1966, he was awarded the Army Commendation Medal for meritorious service in Japan as a deputy information officer and command information officer. In Vietnam, on February 4, 1967, he took command in Saigon of the First Signal Brigade's 400-man security force, providing security for 23 Vietnam communication sites, a duty requiring frequent helicopter flights.

In Tokyo, where Grant was a regular cartoonist for Stars and Stripes, he developed a strong fascination with Japanese comics. He also wrote and drew for Japan's English-language newspapers, including the Mainichi Daily News. His interest in comics was revived in the late 1960s, as he recalled:

When I purchased a French comic magazine in Saigon in 1967, it was the first comic book contact that I had in more than ten years. It reminded me of my early experiments with drawing color comics in grammar school. It helped firm in my mind a plan to continue with my artwork at a future date. In 1968 I was discharged from the United States Army in Japan and began studies in Japanese history and culture at Sophia University in Tokyo. During my years in Japan, I made an intensive study of Japanese cartoonists and their diverse work. In 1972, while still in school, I saw and read my first issue of an underground comic book, The Fabulous Furry Freak Brothers. This publication was quite an interesting item for me. I had heard of underground comic books but had, until that time, never seen one. I was very impressed.

This Love Rangers sword fight illustration was published in The Boston Globe on March 19, 2007.

In 1972, Grant met Betsy Reese, who was also a student at Sophia University. The following year, the couple moved to Cambridge, and they married April 28, 1978. A great-granddaughter of the pioneer Wisconsin landscape photographer H. H. Bennett, Betsy Reese Grant is the author of The Bennett Story: The Life and Work of Henry Hamilton Bennett, published by the H.H. Bennett Studio Foundation, Inc. in 1991.

== Graphic novels and The Love Rangers ==
During the years he lived in Japan, Grant wrote and drew several graphic novels, including the two-volume military satire, Point-Man Palmer and A Monster is Loose in Tokyo (Tuttle, 1972) about the life of a foreigner in Japan.

When he returned to Cambridge, he drew his line of 15 Computer Cartoons postcards, sold in the gift shop of Boston's Computer Museum. He also created The Love Rangers, his science-fiction comic book series about a racially mixed space crew traveling the universe. Between 1977 and 1988, Grant published seven issues of The Love Rangers in a 36-page, 5½"x8½" format. Betsy Grant detailed the premise and plotline of The Love Rangers:

The series follows the lives and adventures of a number of officers, robots and members of a squad of genetically engineered Love Rangers that live on the spaceship called "Home". It is an immense structure, housing 35,000 individuals on its seven levels. While some of the action in the stories takes place on board, many of the episodes in his comic books take place on planets they visit ... The crew is racially mixed, and the ship is commanded by a male and female Shipmaster who shares equally in all responsibilities. One of the dominant characters is Princess Tomi, who single-handedly leads her Mice People in their battle against the Owls for survival. There are robots and devices in the ship that Vernon created, a few of which were not developed for the U.S. military until some ten to 15 years later after Vernon had already incorporated them into this series. According to Vernon, "Their mission and that of their great spaceship is to effect peaceful changes in critical situations through the use of Love." The fuel that powers the ship is feelings of discord and hate that emanate from different parts of the universe. At times the Love Rangers have to use weapons to control the warring inhabitants of the different planets they visit, but they attempt to first use their "love gas" to change the path of history. In the first book, the love gas helps change the consciousness of Count Ratalus from having a killing drive to flooding his mind with an understanding of history as well as nature's instinctive patterns. When this happens, a "well of human compassion overrides his coded savagery." He stops himself from killing Prince Tug, and they go off to work together peacefully for the betterment of the mice people and toward peaceful co-existence with their enemies, the Owls.

== Marathon man ==
As a marathon runner, Grant was a familiar figure in the annual Boston Marathon. He completed a total of 33 marathons, and his wife ran with him in races for years. Interviewed by Pulp, he recalled, "When we came back to America, we did a lot of running. In fact, we were running something in the neighborhood of over 3,500 miles a year for over 25 years. When I'm out running, a lot of the ideas pop into my head, and when I get a chance to sit down, I put them on paper." It was during one of his daily runs that he suffered a heart attack on July 7, 2006, injuring his head when he fell. He went into a coma and died two weeks later on July 23.

== Exhibitions and collections ==
Grant's work is included in Michigan State University's Comic Art Collection.

In March 2007, Betsy Grant curated a month-long exhibition of his artwork for the Cambridge Public Library's Central Square branch. When she was invited back to stage another show on April 1, 2008, at the Cambridge Library, she made The Love Rangers the central focus of the exhibition. On Cambridge Community Television, Vernon Grant was the subject of Lynette Laveau Saxe's Callalloo Express on April 14, 2008, with Saxe presenting both artwork and an extended interview with Betsy Grant.

== Bibliography ==
"Mouse Missing" is a card from the Computer Cartoon postcard set created in 1987 by Vernon Grant for the gift shop in Boston's Computer Museum.

- Computer Cartoons postcards (15)
- Stand-by One!, 1969, collection of single-panel Vietnam cartoons in 13,000 print run. Reissued in 2015 by Little Creek Press. ISBN 9781942586067
- A Monster Is Loose in Tokyo! Tokyo, Japan and Rutland, Vermont: Charles E. Tuttle Company, 1972. ISBN 0-8048-1037-0
- Point-Man Palmer and His Girlfriend "Invisible Peppermint", 1969.
- Point-Man Palmer and His Girlfriend "Invisible Peppermint": Vietnam to Tokyo R&R, 1970.
- Mainichi Daily News. 1972.
- The Love Rangers 1, 1977.
- The Love Rangers 2, 1979.
- The Love Rangers 3, 1981.
- The Love Rangers 4, 1982.
- The Love Rangers 5, 1984.
- The Love Rangers 6, 1986.
- The Love Rangers 7, 1988.
- Ranger Readout, newsletter, 1987.
- The Comics Journal #94, "Samurai Superstrips", 1984.

== See also ==
- List of cartoonists
- List of illustrators
- List of science fiction visual artists

== Sources ==
- Grant, Vernon. "Samurai Superstrips", pages 91–94. The Comics Journal 94, October 1984. Originally published as three-issues series in Mainichi Daily News, 1972.
- Noreascon Four Artist List: Vernon Grant, August 11, 2004.
- Who's Who of American Comic Books: 1928-1999: Vern Grant
