= Prairie Street Historic District =

Historic district in Wisconsin, United States

- U.S. National Register of Historic Places
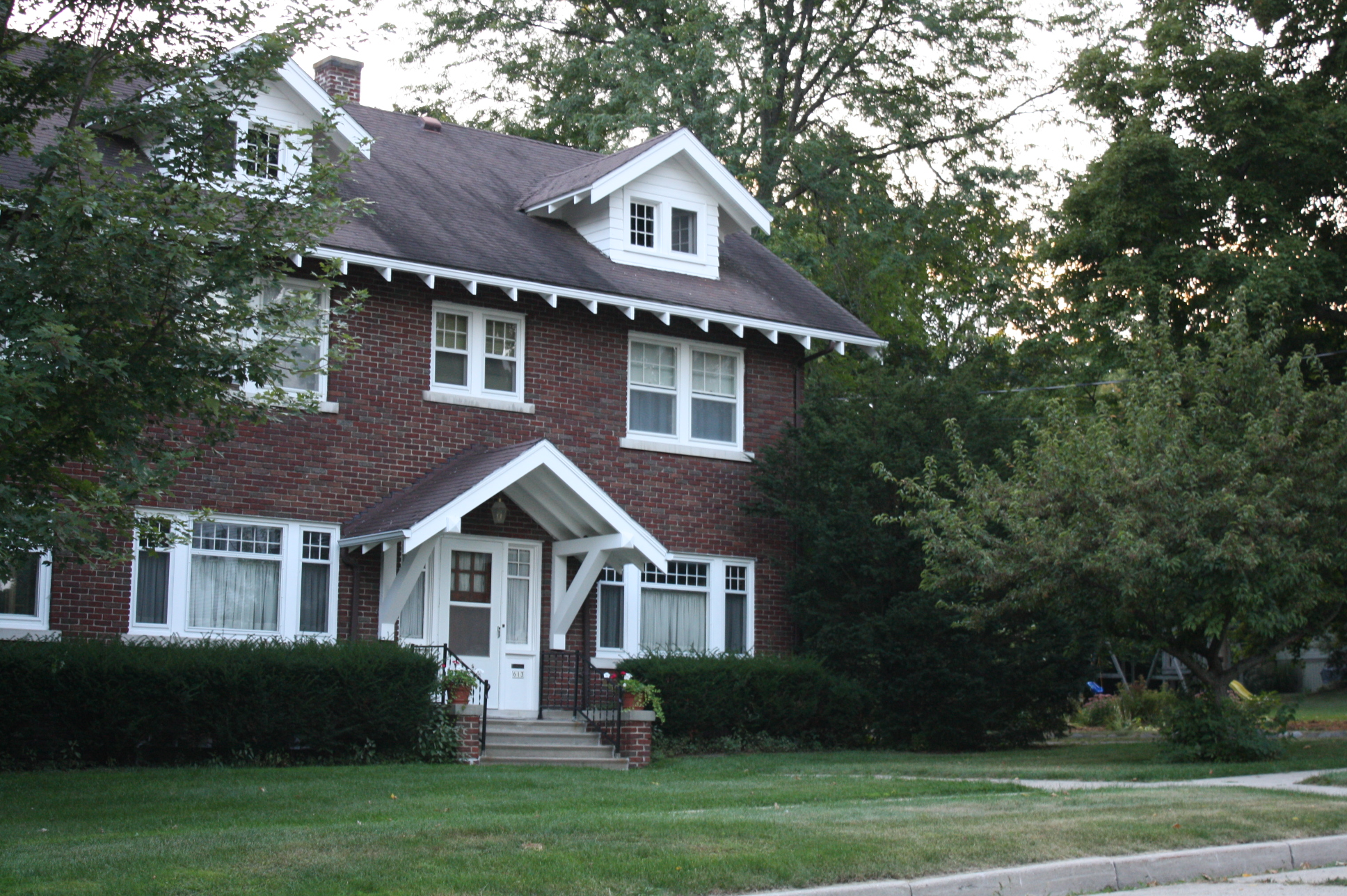
- A house within the district.

- Location within Wisconsin
- Location: Roughly along W. Prairie St., including parts of S. Lewis St. and S. Charles St., Columbus, Wisconsin
- Coordinates: 43°20′23″N 89°01′22″W
- Area: 12 acres (4.9 ha)
- NRHP reference No.: 98001586
- Added to NRHP: January 7, 1999

The Prairie Street Historic District is a residential historic district in Columbus, Wisconsin. The district consists of thirty-nine houses, two carriage houses, and a church along a five-block section of West Prairie Street. The oldest house in the district was built circa 1860, while the most recent was built in 1936. The district is noted for its architectural diversity, a product of the large original lots being subdivided over time and contemporary houses being built on the new lots. Architectural styles represented in the district include Italianate, Queen Anne, Stick Style, Victorian Gothic, American Craftsman, Colonial Revival, Tudor Revival, and Georgian Revival. The district includes works by Milwaukee architects Edward Townsend Mix, Henry C. Koch, and Van Ryn & DeGelleke.

The district was added to the State Register of Historic Places in 1998 and to the National Register of Historic Places the following year. One house in the district, the Tudor Revival F. A. Chadbourn House, is listed individually on the NRHP.
