= Dix Street-Warner Street Historic District =

Historic district in Wisconsin, United States

- U.S. National Register of Historic Places
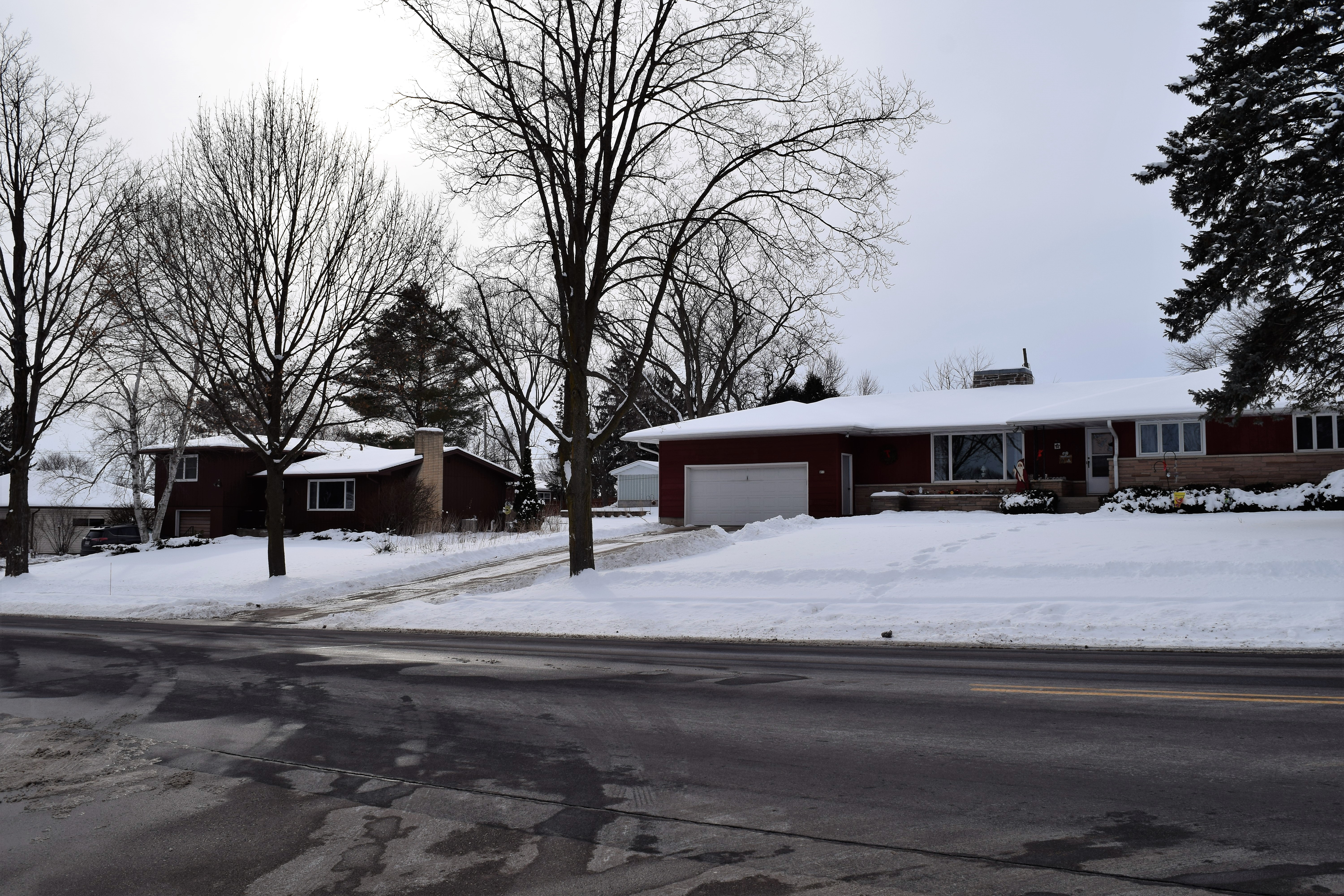
- A portion of the district.

- Location within Wisconsin
- Location: Roughly bounded by Maple Ave., Dix, Hibbard, Warner, Fuller & S. Charles Sts., Columbus, Wisconsin
- Coordinates: 43°20′23″N 89°01′32″W
- NRHP reference No.: 100001444
- Added to NRHP: August 7, 2017

The Dix Street-Warner Street Historic District is a residential historic district on the west side of Columbus, Wisconsin, USA. The district includes twenty-six houses in the 400 through 900 blocks of Dix Street and the 900 blocks of Warner Street and South Charles Street.

== History ==
The oldest house in the district was built in 1941; the rest date from between 1951 and 1970. Most houses in the district have either ranch-style or Modernist designs, both of which were popular in the mid-twentieth century; there are also two Colonial Revival homes in the district. Frank Lloyd Wright designed the 1951 E. Clarke and Julia Arnold House in his Usonian style. While architects were not documented for most other houses in the district, they are notably larger and better-designed than most other postwar housing in Columbus.

The district was added to the National Register of Historic Places on August 7, 2017. The Arnold House is listed independently on the National Register.
