= John A. and Martha Robertson House =

Historic house in Wisconsin, United States

- U.S. National Register of Historic Places
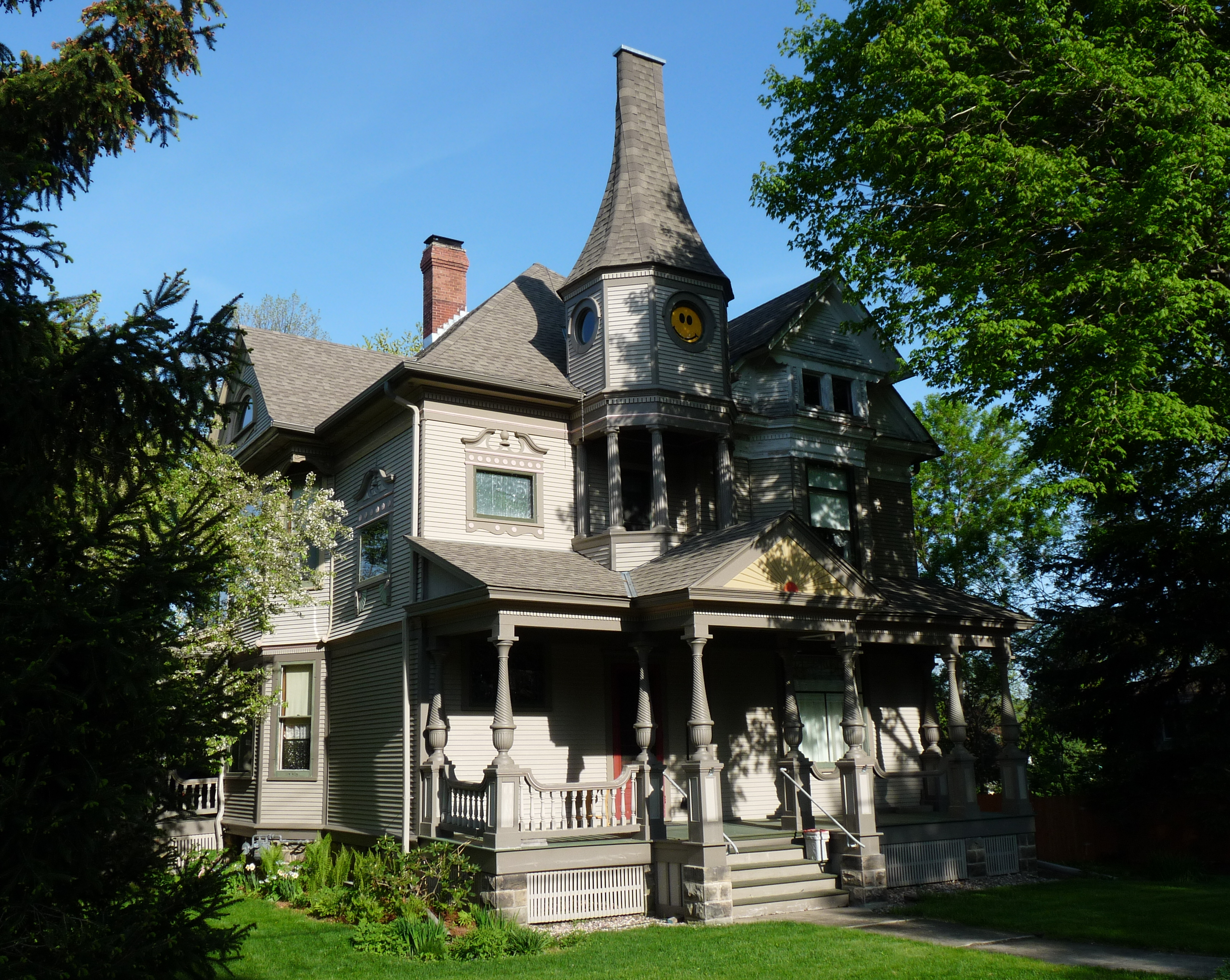

- Location within Wisconsin Location within the United States
- Location: 456 Seminary St., Lodi, Wisconsin
- Coordinates: 43°19′5″N 89°32′0″W
- Area: less than one acre
- Built: 1897
- Architect: Frank L. Lindsay
- Architectural style: Queen Anne
- NRHP reference No.: 08001370
- Added to NRHP: January 22, 2009

The John A. and Martha Robertson House is a historic house at 456 Seminary Street in Lodi, Wisconsin, United States. It was added to the National Register of Historic Places on January 22, 2009.

== History ==
The house was built in 1897 for businessman John Robertson and his wife Martha. Robertson moved to Lodi from his hometown of Vienna, Wisconsin the same year; he had also spent several years in Nebraska as a land developer. Architect Frank L. Lindsay designed the Queen Anne style house. The two-and-a-half story house features a full-width front porch with a sunburst pediment over the entrance, an octagonal tower atop the front facade with a steep roof, wooden window surrounds topped by broken pediments, dentillated molding and frieze boards below the eaves, and a hip roof with cross gables.
