= H. H. Bennett =

American photographer

Henry Hamilton Bennett
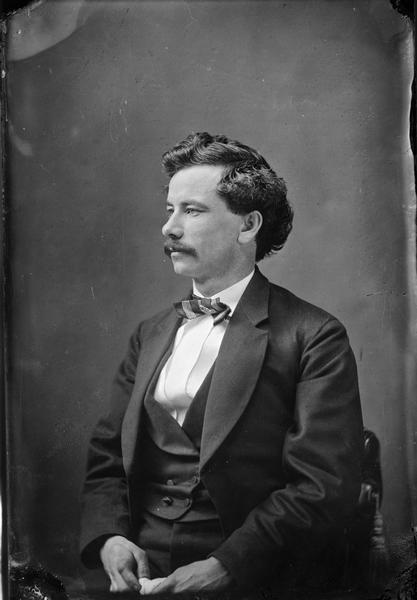
- Studio portrait of H. H. Bennett
- Born: January 15, 1843; Farnham, Quebec
- Died: January 1, 1908 (aged 64); Wisconsin Dells, Wisconsin
- Burial place: Spring Grove Cemetery, Wisconsin Dells
- Occupation: Photographer

Henry Hamilton Bennett (January 15, 1843 – January 1, 1908) was an American photographer famous for his pictures of the Dells of the Wisconsin River and surrounding region taken between 1865 and 1908. The popularity of his photographs helped turn the city of Wisconsin Dells, Wisconsin into a tourist destination.

== Early life ==
Bennett was born in Farnham, Quebec and raised in Brattleboro, Vermont. In 1857, at the age of 14, Bennett moved with his father and uncle to Wisconsin. The group settled in Kilbourn City, today known as Wisconsin Dells, and Henry worked as a carpenter in the town. After the outbreak of the American Civil War, Bennett joined the 12th Wisconsin Infantry Regiment and fought in the Battle of Vicksburg before being severely wounded by the accidental discharge of his own gun. After the war, the wound prevented Bennett from returning to carpentry, so in 1865 he bought the Kilbourn City photography studio operated by Leroy Gates and began a career as a photographer. Shortly afterward, in 1866, he married Francis Douty, and the couple eventually had three children. Douty died in 1884 and Bennett married Evaline Marshall in 1890, with whom he had two more children.

Due to the low demand for portraits in the area, Bennett set his sights on landscape photography. His training as a carpenter served him well. Bennett made all of his own equipment except for the glass lenses in his cameras. He built himself a portable darkroom, and then towed it, his camera, and other necessary equipment with him across the local countryside taking pictures. He didn't have to go far to find impressive scenery, for the Wisconsin River Dells, a gorge with numerous sandstone formations, was just outside Kilbourn City. Bennett loaded a boat with his photographic equipment and took many pictures of the Dells. Realizing that the three-dimensional aspect of the rock formations would be lost in two-dimensional photographs, he began creating stereoscopic images that allowed viewers to see the Dells in three dimensions. Bennett made his first stereoscopic photo in 1868, and they soon became very popular, being sold in cities across the United States.

== Innovations in photography ==
Image showing Bennett's son, Ashley, leaping across Stand Rock in Wisconsin Dells, Wisconsin. The image was used as proof that Bennett's advanced shutter technology worked.

As people across the country saw more and more of Bennett's photographs of the Wisconsin Dells, they began to flock to Kilbourn City to see the rock formations in person. The area quickly became a destination for sightseers eager to leave behind the bustle of the city. Bennett capitalized on this, building the H. H. Bennett Studio in 1875 and using it to sell postcards and souvenir portraits to travelers. In the meantime, he continued to innovate in the field of photography by inventing a stop action shutter which allowed him to take photographs of instantaneous events. Previously, it took several minutes for a camera to take a picture, and any movement of the subject being photographed over this time caused the picture to become blurry.

After Bennett created the new shutter, he was able to take clear pictures of moving subjects. The best known photograph taken by Bennett with this device was an 1886 image of his son Ashley jumping between two rock formations in the Dells. Boston audiences of 1890 gasped when this photograph was projected as a magic lantern slide. Bennett also introduced narrative concepts, as noted by his great-granddaughter, Betsy Reese Grant, in The Bennett Story:

From 1832 until 1890, every spring saw raftsmen riding their lumber to market down the Wisconsin River. Bennett had always been interested in taking a series of pictures of their activities. In 1886 dry plates had finally become reliable enough that he did not need his portable darkroom. Henry and his son Ashley made a 100-mile, week-long trip on a lumber raft. Between Kilbourn and Boscobel, Wisconsin, he took 30 pictures of the raftsmen's different activities. He then combined these with other pictures taken near Kilbourn and called the series, The Story of Raftsmen's Life on the Wisconsin. This was the first time a photographer wrote a "story" with pictures. Photo journalism was born.

Bennett also innovated in the way he printed pictures, building a revolving solar printing house that is now housed at the Smithsonian Institution. In addition, because early cameras were unable to accurately capture details of the sky or reflections in water after being adjusted for the light of a typical land photograph, Bennett wove together negatives from multiple photographs of land, sky and water before creating a final print. Bennett received much attention for his advanced techniques, and was commissioned by the Chicago, Milwaukee & St. Paul Railroad to photograph the landscape along the company's track in Wisconsin. Bennett also took pictures outside the state, photographing an ice palace in St. Paul, Minnesota and the World's Columbian Exposition in Chicago, Illinois. Finally, Bennett photographed the huge circular paintings known as cycloramas, publishing sets of stereoviews on the Civil War cycloramas of the Battles of Shiloh, Gettysburg and Missionary Ridge, the engagement between the Monitor and the Virginia, as well as the Crucifixion.

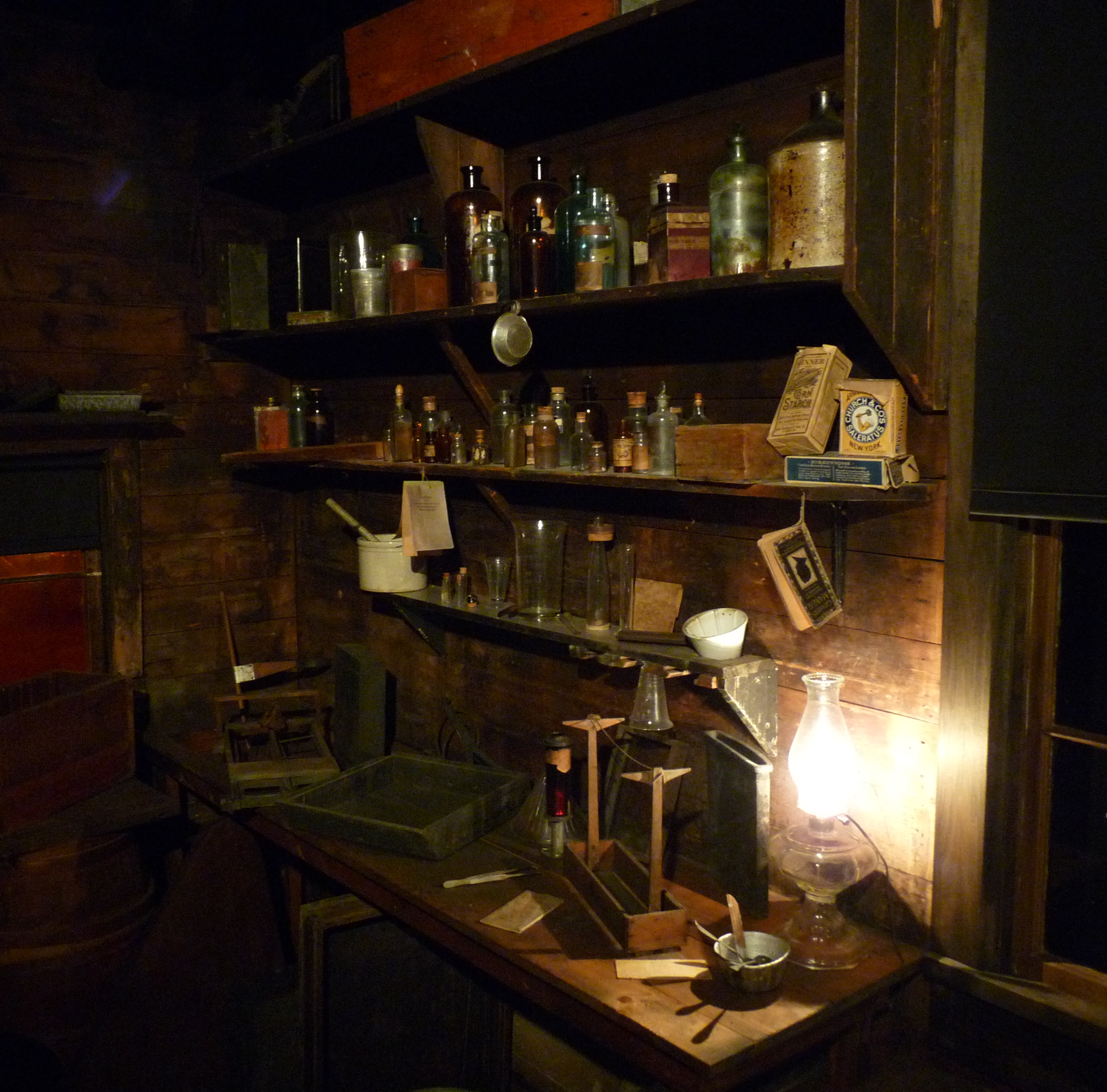
Darkroom inside Bennett's studio

As portable film cameras became widespread in the 1890s, Bennett's career declined somewhat because tourists coming to see the Dells were able to take their own souvenir photos and no longer needed Bennett's postcards or portraits. Nevertheless, Bennett pressed on in his profession, selling gift shop type items from his studio to attract more customers and continuing as a professional landscape photographer until his death from Bright's disease in 1908. Following his death, Bennett's family took over the photography studio, remodeling it in 1917. His descendants continued to operate the studio until 1999, when the building was restored to its 1908 appearance and became a historic site operated by the Wisconsin Historical Society.

== See also ==
- Jacob Weber House, Bennett's former home, now listed on the National Register of Historic Places

== Watch ==
- Wisconsin Stories: "The H.H. Bennett Studio" (2001)
