= Pardeeville Presbyterian Church =

Historic church in Wisconsin, United States

- U.S. National Register of Historic Places
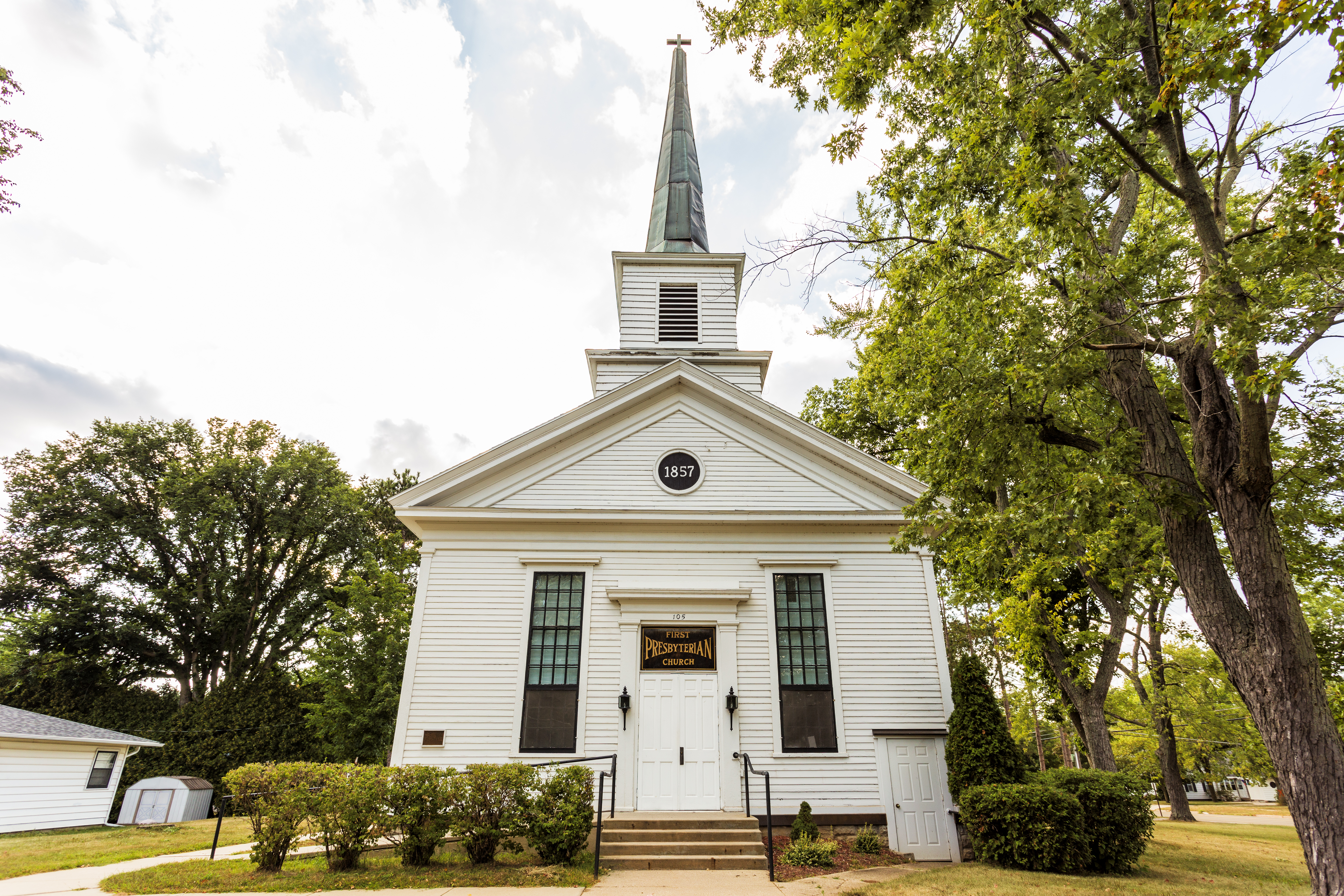

- Location within Wisconsin Location within the United States
- Location: 105 S. Main St., Pardeeville, Wisconsin
- Coordinates: 43°32′7″N 89°18′8″W
- Area: 0.5 acres (0.20 ha)
- Built: 1865
- Architectural style: Greek Revival
- NRHP reference No.: 80000114
- Added to NRHP: January 15, 1980

Pardeeville Presbyterian Church is a historic Presbyterian church located at 105 South Main Street in Pardeeville, Wisconsin. Pardeeville's Presbyterian congregation, which was founded in 1857, built the church from 1863 to 1865. The congregation copied the church's Greek Revival design from the Welsh Congregation Church in nearby Cambria. At the time, Greek Revival churches were rare in Wisconsin, as the style was more common in residential buildings. The church's front entrance is flanked by pilasters and topped by a transom and a dentillated cornice. A pediment tops the front facade, and a louvered belfry and copper spire rise above the pediment.

The church was added to the National Register of Historic Places on January 15, 1980.
