= Jacob Weber House =

Historic house in Wisconsin, United States

- U.S. National Register of Historic Places
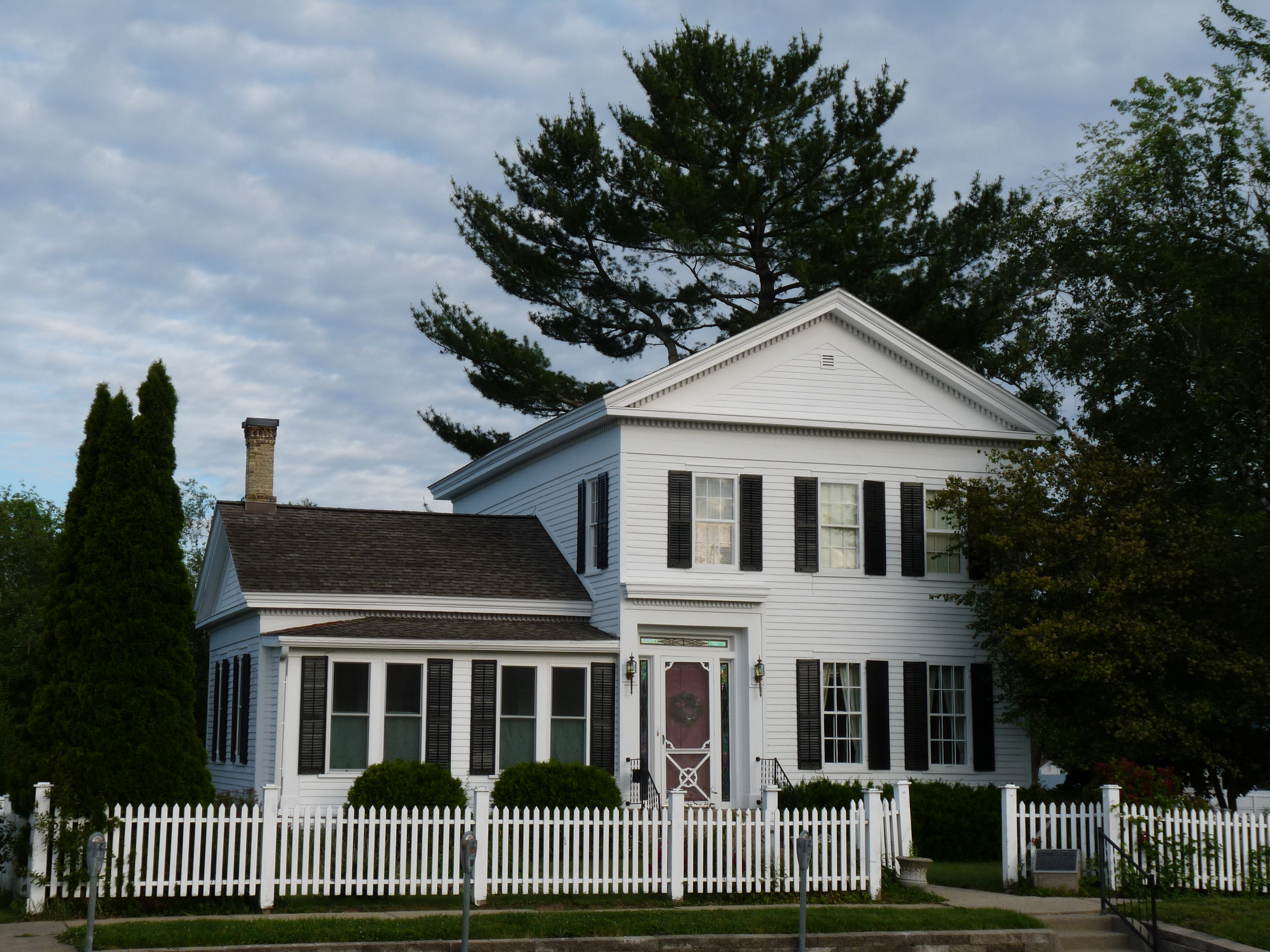
- Jacob Weber House
- Location: 825 Oak St., Wisconsin Dells, Wisconsin
- Coordinates: 43°37′44″N 89°46′27″W
- Area: 0.6 acres (0.24 ha)
- Built: 1863
- Architect: Jacob Weber
- Architectural style: Greek Revival
- NRHP reference No.: 78000083
- Added to NRHP: January 20, 1978

The Jacob Weber House is located in Wisconsin Dells, Wisconsin.

== History ==
The house was built by Jacob Weber, Postmaster of what was then Kilbourn City. Photographer H. H. Bennett bought the house in 1891 and his family lived there until 1971. The house was listed on the National Register of Historic Places in 1978 and on the State Register of Historic Places in 1989.
