= H. H. Bennett Studio =

- U.S. National Register of Historic Places
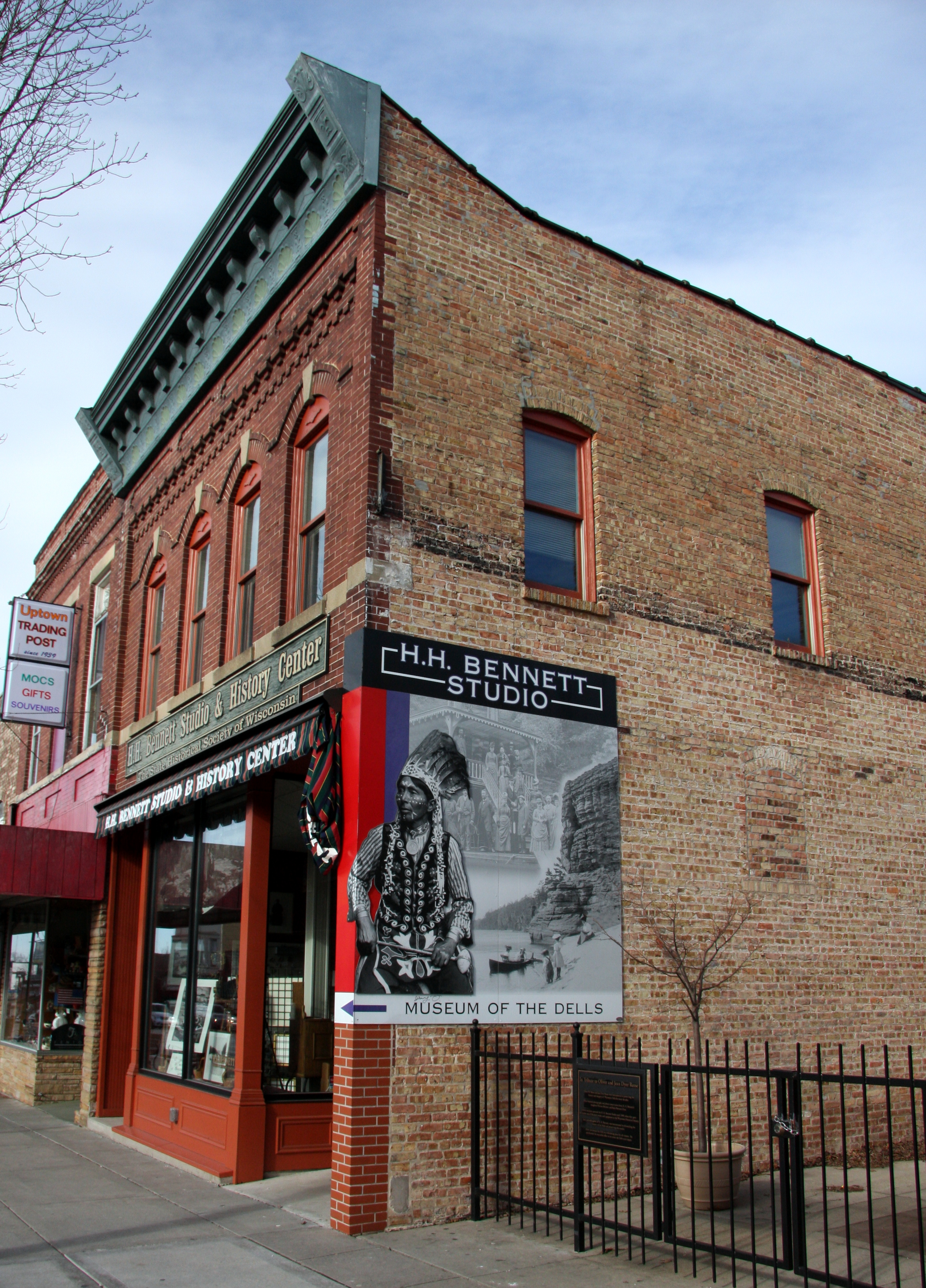
- The H. H. Bennett Studio & History Center in 2013

- Location within Wisconsin Location within the United States
- Location: 215 Broadway, Wisconsin Dells, Wisconsin
- Coordinates: 43°37′41″N 89°46′28″W
- Area: less than one acre
- Built: 1875
- Architectural style: Tudor Revival
- NRHP reference No.: 76000054
- Added to NRHP: October 8, 1976

The H. H. Bennett Studio is a historic photographic studio and photography museum located in Wisconsin Dells, Wisconsin, United States. The studio building was built in 1875 by noted landscape photographer H. H. Bennett. It was operated by his family until 1998, when the studio was donated to the Wisconsin Historical Society. Today the studio, which is listed on the National Register of Historic Places, serves as a historical museum.

== History ==
H. H. Bennett began his career as a photographer in 1865, when he bought a portrait studio in Kilbourn City (now Wisconsin Dells) from local photographer Leroy Gates. Although there was little demand for portraits in the area, Bennett was able to achieve fame for a series of photographs he took of the nearby Dells of the Wisconsin River. As Bennett's pictures of local scenery became popular in cities across the nation, sightseers began to flock to Kilbourn City to view the Dells in person. Bennett capitalized on this by offering the tourists souvenir postcards and portraits, and was able to build a new red brick studio in 1875. This is the structure that still stands in Wisconsin Dells today. In addition to operating as a typical photographic studio, Bennett's studio functioned as a gift shop and information center for the surrounding area, selling souvenirs and crafts to visitors.

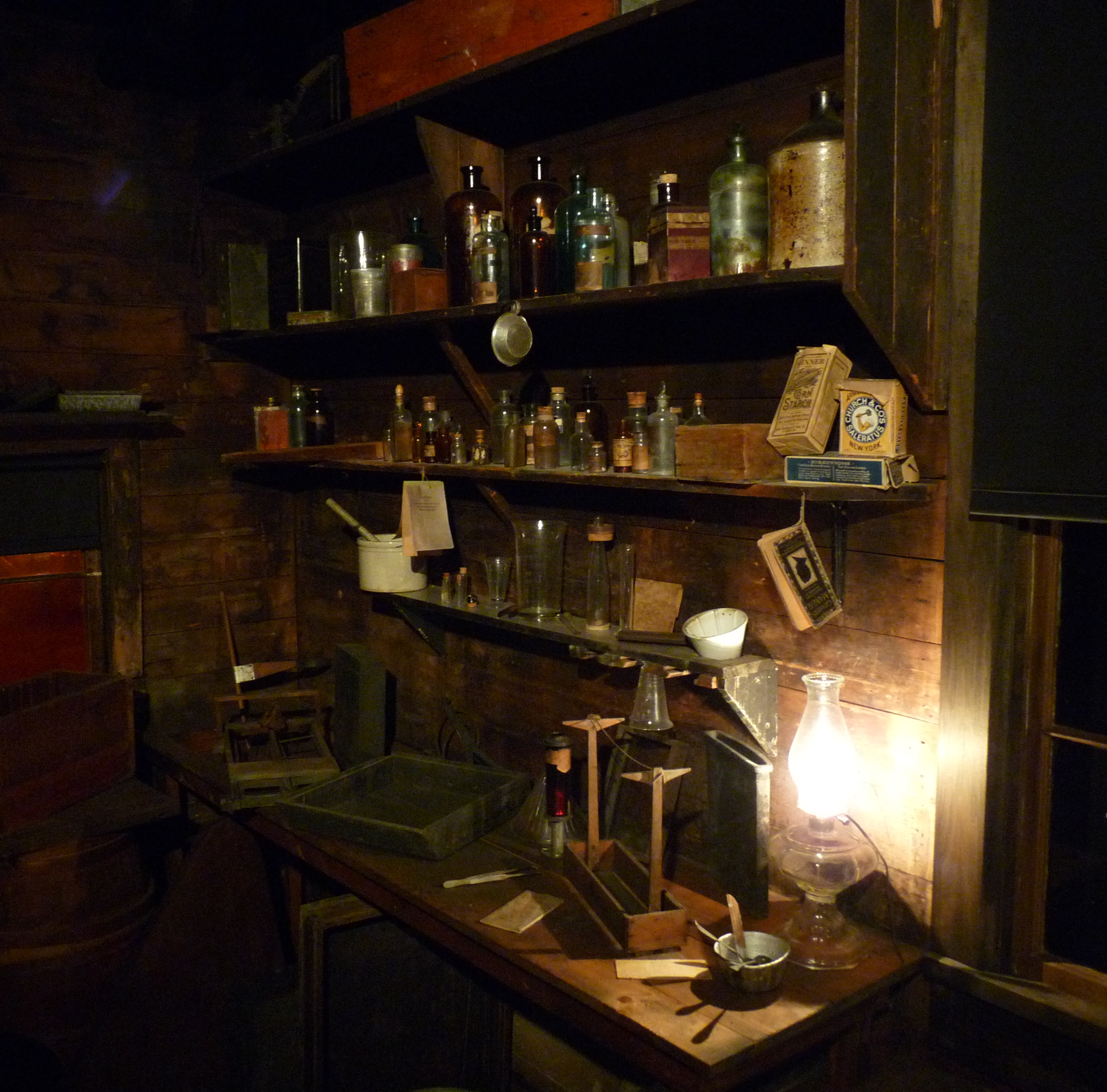
Bennett's darkroom

At the studio, Bennett devised a number of new technologies to advance his photography. Among the most notable of his creations was his revolving solar printing house. Printing photos in Bennett's time required light, and because electricity was not available, sunlight was needed for Bennett to print any pictures. However, to ensure that he had sufficient sunlight throughout the day, Bennett needed a way to move his workspace while the sun moved in the sky. To achieve this, he constructed a small building with skylights, and mounted it upon rollers that rode a circular track outside his studio. Then, using a cable and pulley system, he was able to move the printing house around the track as often as needed to ensure optimum sunlight for printing. Bennett's unique creation is now housed in the Smithsonian Institution in Washington, D.C.

== Museum ==
Following H. H. Bennett's death in 1908, the operation of the photography studio passed to his children, and his descendants continued to own the studio until 1998, when it was donated to the Wisconsin Historical Society for use as a historic site. Following its acquisition of the site, the historical society restored the studio building to its 1908 appearance. This project was completed in 2000, and the restored studio is now open to the public as the H. H. Bennett Studio & History Center. In addition to offering exhibits that recreate the interior workspace of the studio as it was used by Bennett, the museum gives visitors the opportunity to view Bennett's many stereoscopic images of the Wisconsin Dells in three dimensions using LCD shutter glasses. The site is also home to a replica of Bennett's revolving solar printing house.

== See also ==
- List of museums devoted to one photographer
