= Joel M. Pruyn Block =

- U.S. National Register of Historic Places
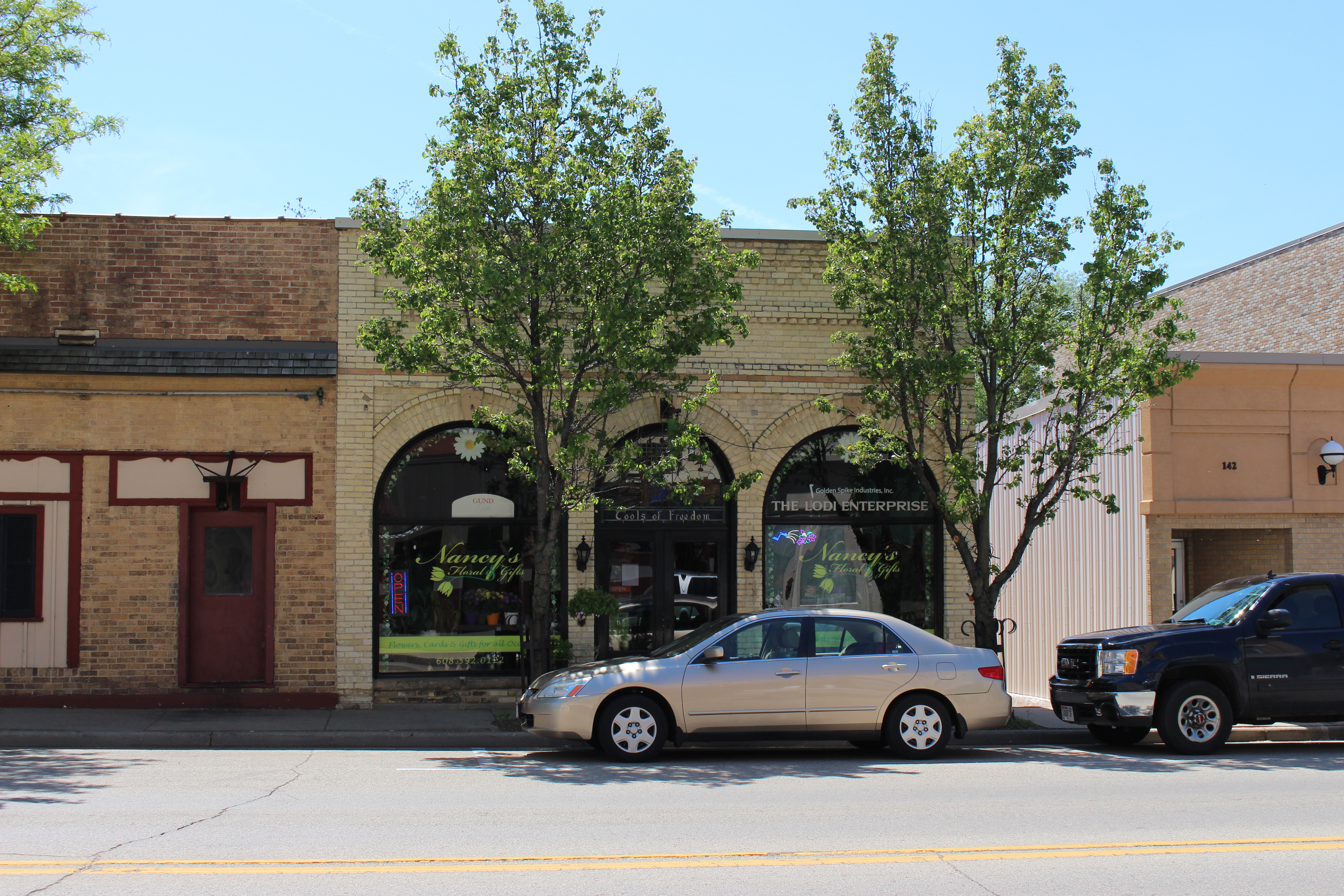

- Location within Wisconsin Location within the United States
- Location: 146 S. Main St., Lodi, Wisconsin
- Coordinates: 43°18′48″N 89°31′36″W
- Area: less than one acre
- Built: 1881
- Architectural style: Romanesque Revival
- NRHP reference No.: 08001001
- Added to NRHP: October 14, 2008

The Joel M. Pruyn Block is a historic commercial building at 146 S. Main Street in Lodi, Wisconsin, United States. It was added to the National Register of Historic Places in 2008.

== History ==
Joel Pruyn, a local grocer and butcher, had the building constructed in 1881 for his son Joel M. Pruyn's grocery store. The one-story building has a vernacular design with Romanesque Revival influences, which are most prominent in its large arched storefront windows. The younger Pruyn ran the store until 1892, when L. P. Hinds bought the building for his butcher shop. The Lodi Enterprise, the local newspaper, purchased the building from Hinds in 1923; the newspaper has been published out of the building ever since.
