= Belmont Hotel (Pardeeville, Wisconsin) =

- U.S. National Register of Historic Places
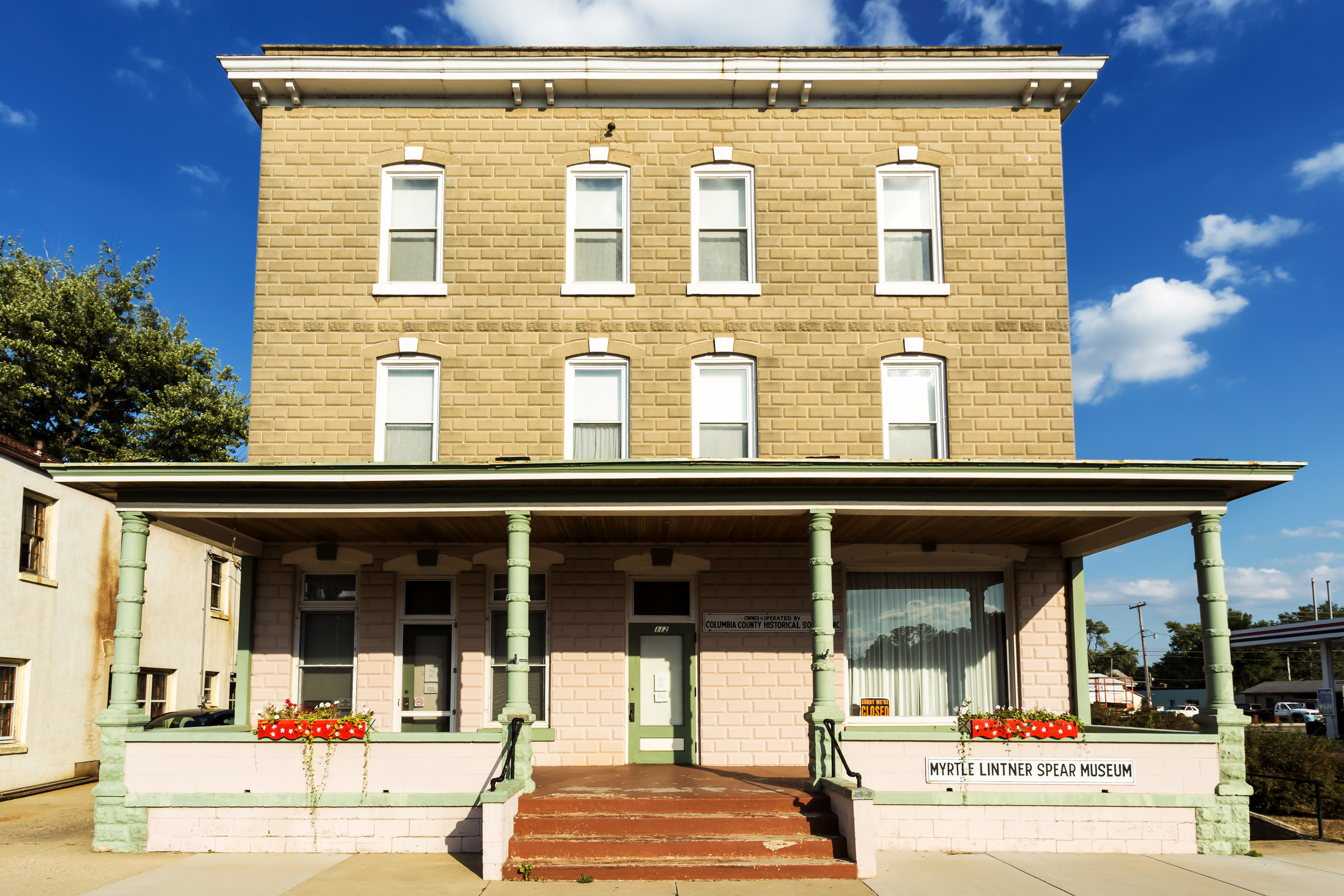

- Location within Wisconsin Location within the United States
- Location: 112 N Main St., Pardeeville, Wisconsin
- Coordinates: 43°32′12.27″N 89°18′0.58″W
- Area: less than one acre
- Architect: Williams, Charles H. and Neck Brothers
- Architectural style: Classical Revival
- NRHP reference No.: 93001170
- Added to NRHP: November 4, 1993

The Belmont Hotel is located in Pardeeville, Wisconsin. It was added to the National Register of Historic Places in 1993.

== History ==
The hotel was built in the late Victorian architectural style in 1909. Adjacent to the village's train station, the hotel served travelers from multiple daily trains. In 1973, it was donated to the Columbia County, Wisconsin Historical Society and was transformed into the Columbia County Museum, also known as the Myrtle Lintner Spear Museum.
