= Angie Williams Cox Library =

- Cox, Angie Williams, Library
- U.S. National Register of Historic Places
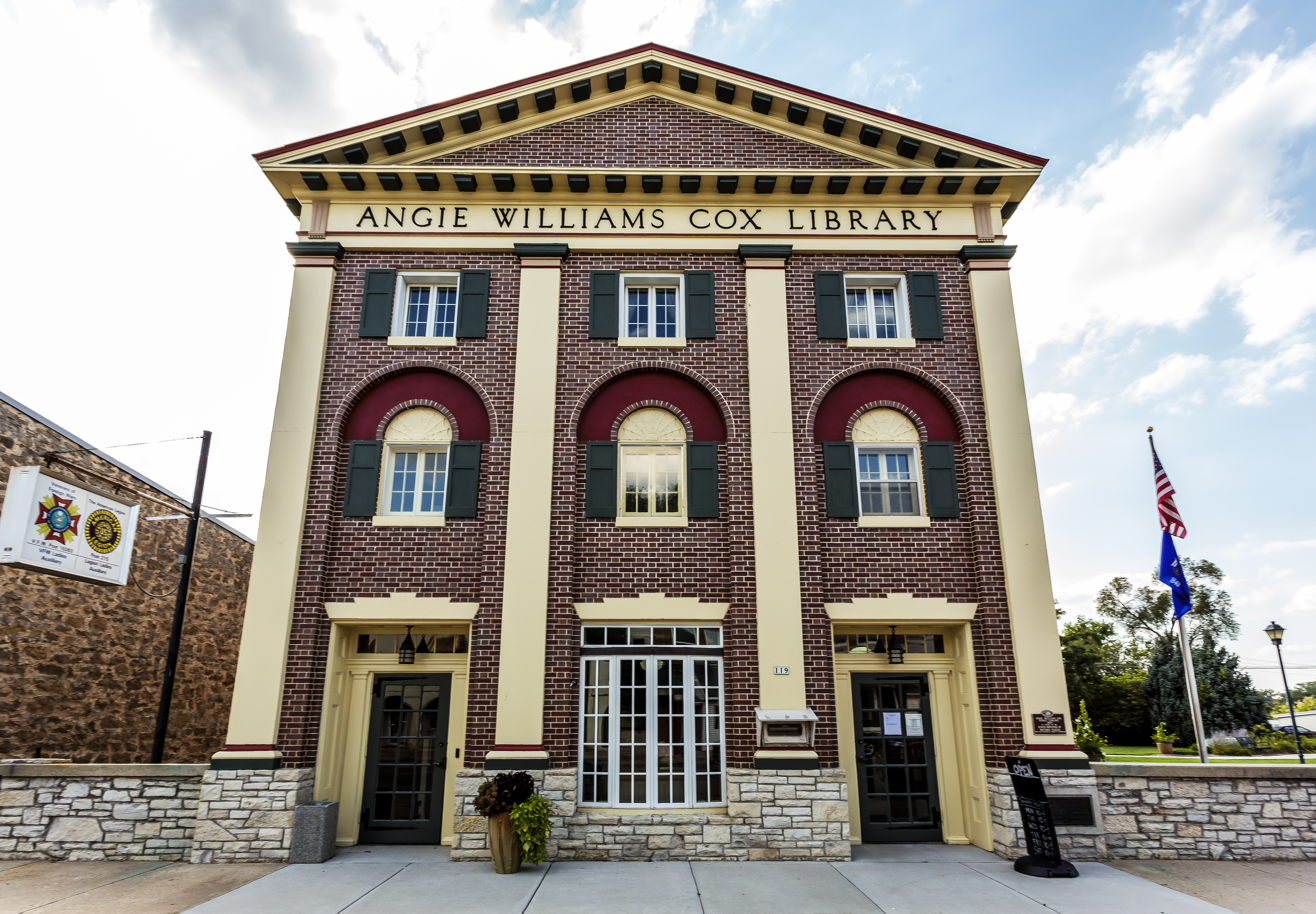
- Angie Williams Cox Library

- Location within Wisconsin Location within the United States
- Location: 129 N. Main St., Pardeeville, Wisconsin
- Coordinates: 43°32′14″N 89°18′1″W
- Area: less than one acre
- Built: 1934
- Architect: Stanhope, Leon E.
- Architectural style: Colonial Revival
- MPS: Public Library Facilities of Wisconsin MPS
- NRHP reference No.: 90001703
- Added to NRHP: November 15, 1990

The Angie Williams Cox Public Library is located in Pardeeville, Wisconsin. It was added to the National Register of Historic Places in 1990. The library is also listed on the Wisconsin State Register of Historic Places.

== History ==
The library was sponsored by Angie Williams Cox. It opened in its original location in 1925. A year after its opening, the library was accused of discrimination against Roman Catholics and was threatened to have its public funding pulled. The case ultimately went before the Wisconsin Supreme Court, which ruled in the library's favor. In 1934, Angie Williams Cox purchased the building that currently houses the library. The building had previously been used by the Independent Order of Odd Fellows and was remodeled to suit the library.
