= Kingsley Bend Mound Group =

- U.S. National Register of Historic Places
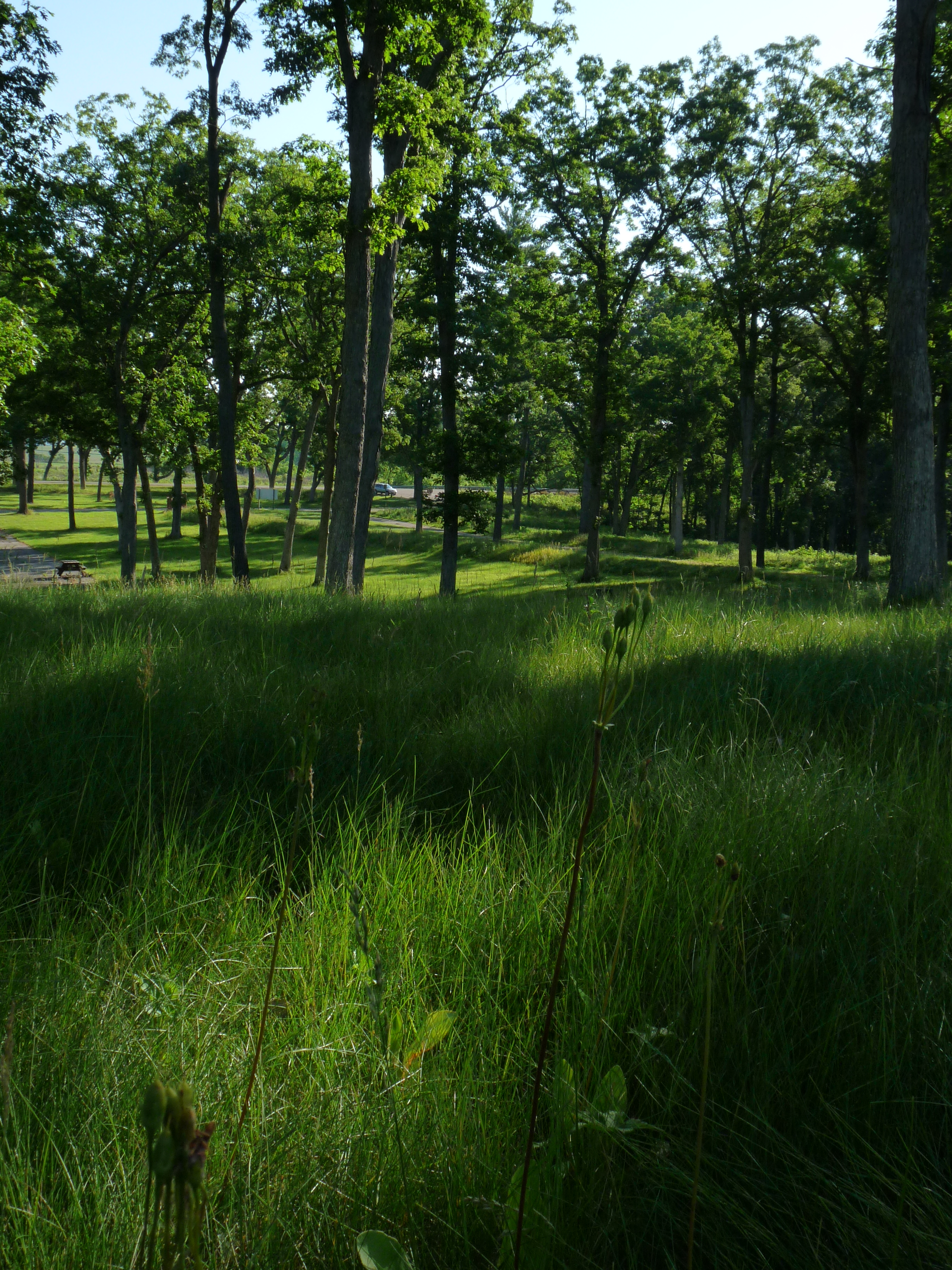

- Location within Wisconsin
- Location: WIS 16 3 mi. SE of Wisconsin Dells, Wisconsin
- Coordinates: 43°36′05″N 89°42′41″W
- Area: 8.2 acres (3.3 ha)
- MPS: Late Woodland Stage in Archeological Region 8 MPS
- NRHP reference No.: 98001088
- Added to NRHP: August 20, 1998

The Kingsley Bend Mound Group is a group of pre-Columbian Native American mounds along Wisconsin Highway 16 3 miles (4.8 km) southeast of Wisconsin Dells, Wisconsin. The site includes effigy mounds in the shape of a water spirit, a bird, and two bears, along with several linear and conical mounds. The mounds were built during the Late Woodland period between roughly 700 and 1000 A.D., the era in which most effigy mounds in Wisconsin were built. The site was maintained by the Wisconsin Department of Transportation as a wayside until 2006, when the Ho-Chunk Nation took ownership of the property.

The site was added to the National Register of Historic Places on August 20, 1998.
