= South Dickason Boulevard Residential Historic District =

Historic district in Wisconsin, United States

- U.S. National Register of Historic Places
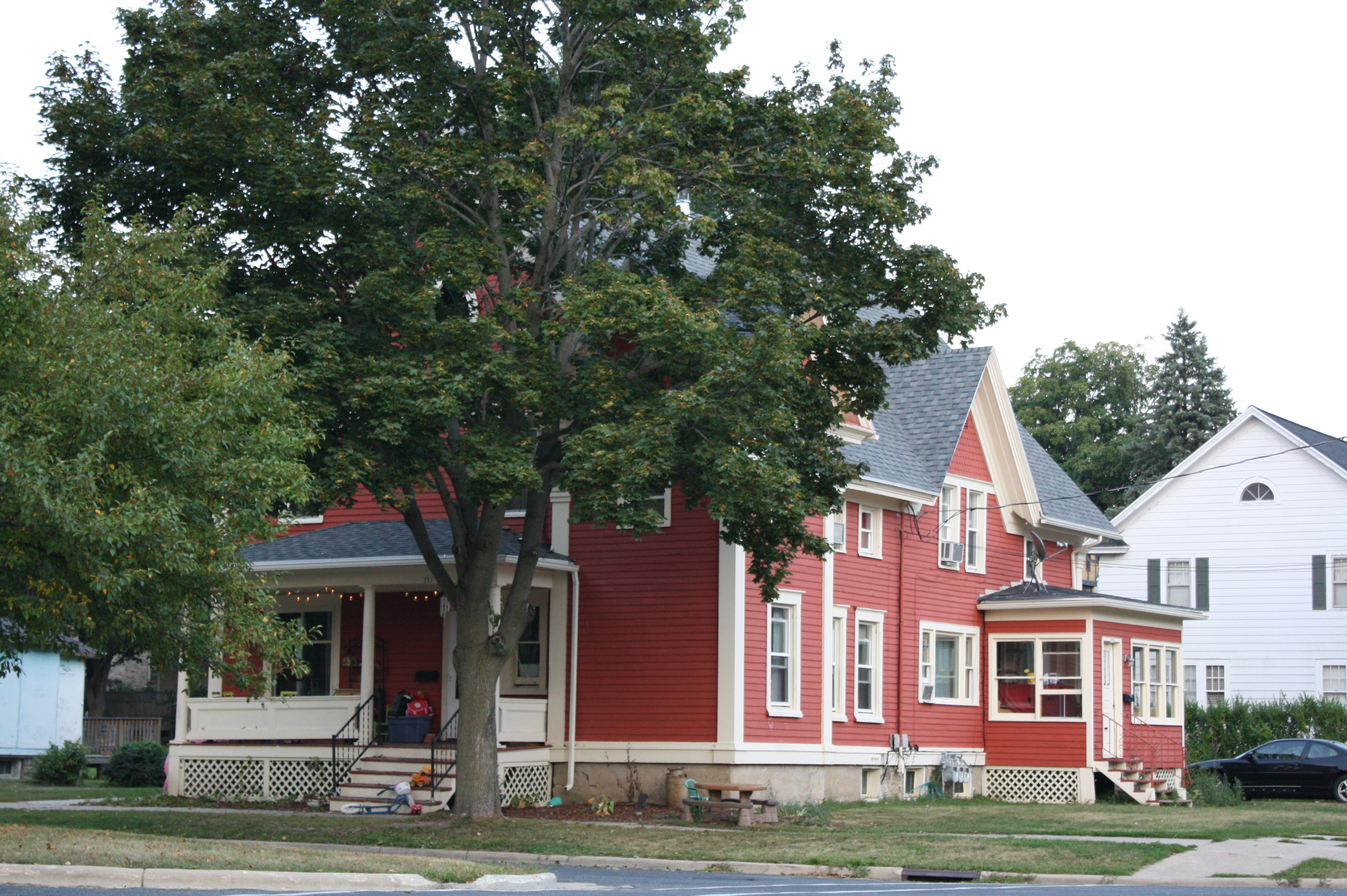
- A house within the district.
- Location: Roughly along S. Dickason Blvd., from W. School St. to W. Harrison, also along S. Ludington St., Columbus, Wisconsin
- Coordinates: 43.33734°N 89.01743°W
- Area: 6 acres (2.4 ha)
- NRHP reference No.: 99000240
- Added to NRHP: March 4, 1999

The South Dickason Boulevard Residential Historic District is located in Columbus, Wisconsin.

== Description ==
The district includes the early 1860s Greek Revival-remodeled-as-Queen Anne Long/Baker house, the 1868 Italianate Manning house, the 1900 Queen Anne Wright house, the 1921 Craftsman Fritz house, and the 1930 Norman Revival Albrecht house. It was added to the State Register of Historic Places in 1998 and to the National Register of Historic Places the following year.
