= Clara F. Bacon House =

Historic house in Wisconsin, United States

- U.S. National Register of Historic Places
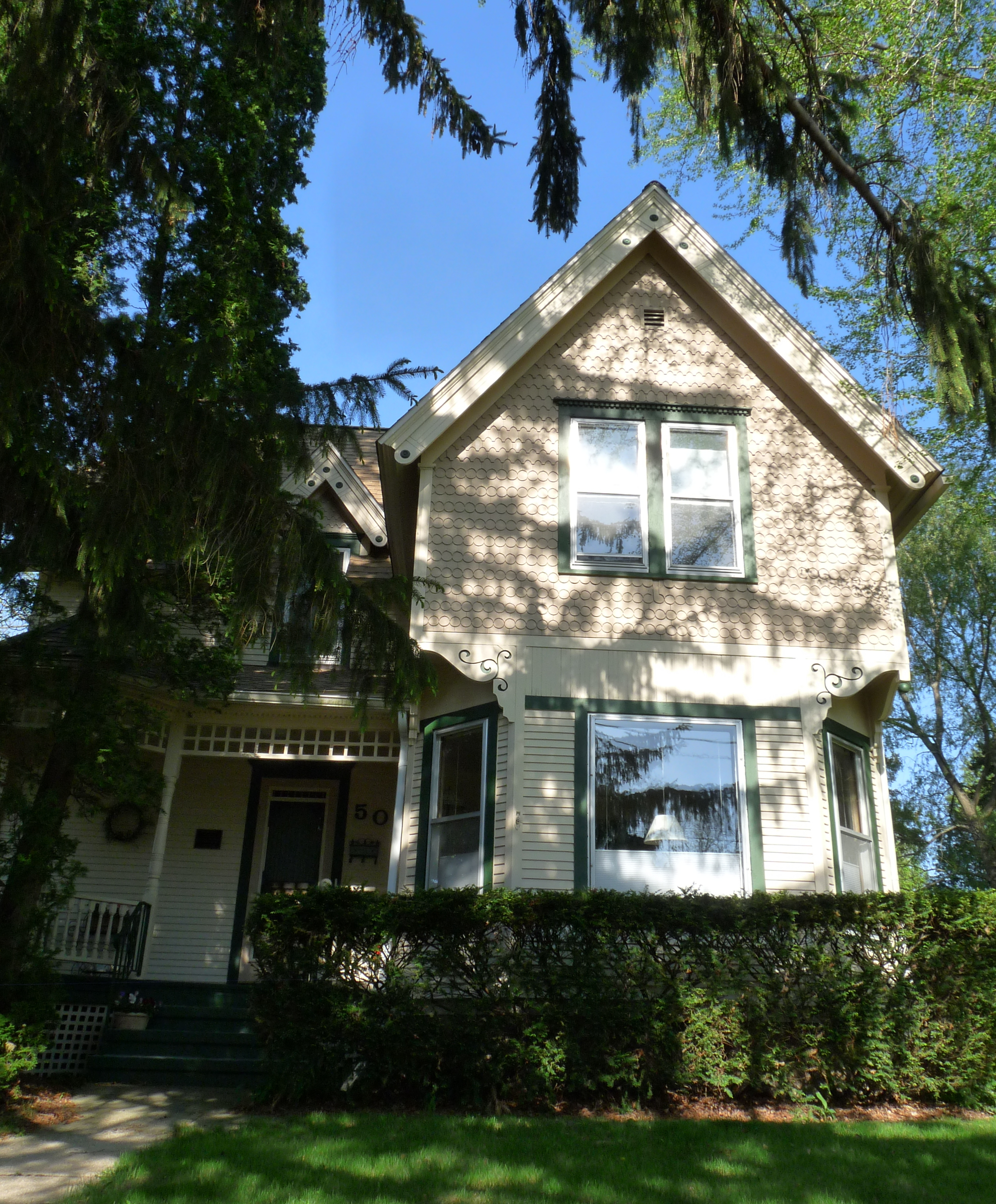

- Location within Wisconsin Location within the United States
- Location: 509 Madison Ave., Lodi, Wisconsin
- Coordinates: 43°18′42″N 89°31′27″W
- Area: less than one acre
- Built: 1899
- Architectural style: Queen Anne
- NRHP reference No.: 08001328
- Added to NRHP: January 14, 2009

The Clara F. Bacon House is a historic house at 509 Madison Avenue in Lodi, Wisconsin. It was added to the National Register of Historic Places in 2009.

== History ==
The house was built in 1899 for Clara F. Bacon, who moved to Lodi from Baraboo, Wisconsin after the death of her husband Carlos. While Carlos was a prominent Baraboo businessman, Clara had lived in Lodi before marrying him and still had ties to the city. The two-story house has a Queen Anne design, a popular style in the United States in the late nineteenth century; its architect is unknown, though it is similar to pattern book designs of the era. The house's design includes a hip roof with cross gables, patterned shingles on the gable ends, ornamental frieze boards, and a turret atop the front porch.
