= Church Hill Historic District (Portage, Wisconsin) =

Historic district in Wisconsin, United States

- U.S. National Register of Historic Places
- U.S. Historic district
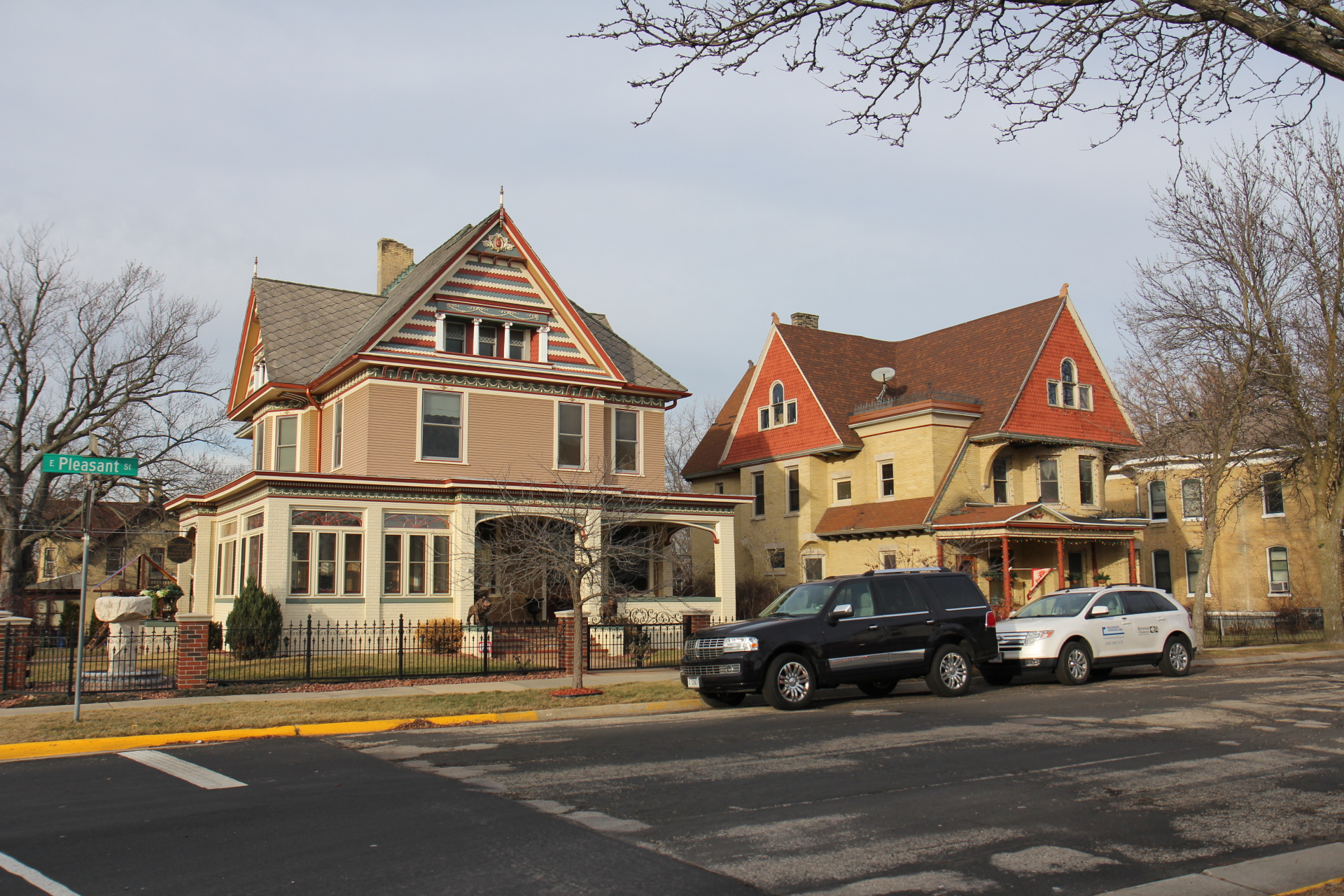
- Two houses in the district, 2014

- Location within Wisconsin Location within the United States
- Location: Roughly bounded by Adams, Pleasant, Lock, and Franklin Sts., Portage, Wisconsin
- Area: 23.9 acres (9.7 ha)
- Architectural style: Queen Anne, Italianate
- NRHP reference No.: 96001628
- Added to NRHP: January 25, 1997

The Church Hill Historic District is a mid-to-upper-class residential area north of Portage's downtown. It was added to the National Register of Historic Places in 1997 for its significance in architecture and social history.

The district is named for the six churches on the hill. It lies on a southeast-sloping hillside with the downtown to the south, the Society Hill historic district to the west, and later, middle and upper-class neighborhoods to the north and east. The homes in the Church Hill district were built as early as 1855. The most common styles are Queen Anne and Italianate, with notable structures listed below in the order built.

== Buildings ==
- The duplex at 214-218 W. Howard is perhaps the oldest surviving structure in the district, built in 1855 as the Methodist Episcopal Church. In 1898 the congregation moved to a larger building at the corner of DeWitt and E. Pleasant and sold this building. In 1900 the new owner removed the steeple and converted the old church to a double residence, but it still retains the pediments, entablature, and corner pilasters which are hallmarks of Greek Revival style.
- The German Evangelical Church at 233 W. Howard St. was built in 1871, a cream brick building in Romanesque Revival-style with a square tower on one side of the front and a steeple on the other side. Converted to a residence around 1973.
- The Harvey Smith house at 603 DeWitt is a Second Empire-styled house completed in 1873. It is a 2.5-story home with a mansard roof, the hallmark of the style, and it is the only Second Empire house in the district. Smith was a cooper who owned house, but probably rented it out. Zona Gale's father Charles may have rented the house around 1886.
- St. John's Evangelical Lutheran Church at 701 McFarlane Road is a Romanesque Revival-styled cream brick church built in 1874 with a tower centered at the front.
- The William Fulton house at 134 W. Franklin is a cream brick 2-story house built in 1874. The house is styled Gothic Revival in the steep gables, the bay window, and the elaborate woodwork. Fulton was an immigrant from England, running a grocery business in Portage, advertising "Groceries, Seeds, Crockery, Glassware, etc." He also ran a creamery.
- The James Gowran house at 223 W. Pleasant is a two-story Italianate cream brick home built in 1877 with a low hip roof and wide bracketed eaves, and bay windows. The wraparound front porch was added between 1894 and 1897. Gowran sold farm implements with Hugh O. Lewis. Gowran's property includes a carriage house he built in 1877, clad in board and batten.
- The Hugh O. Lewis house at 111 E. Pleasant is a two-story cream brick Italianate house built in 1879. Lewis was a blacksmith who ran a shop that built and sold farm implements. Over time, the porch and side wing were added to the house.

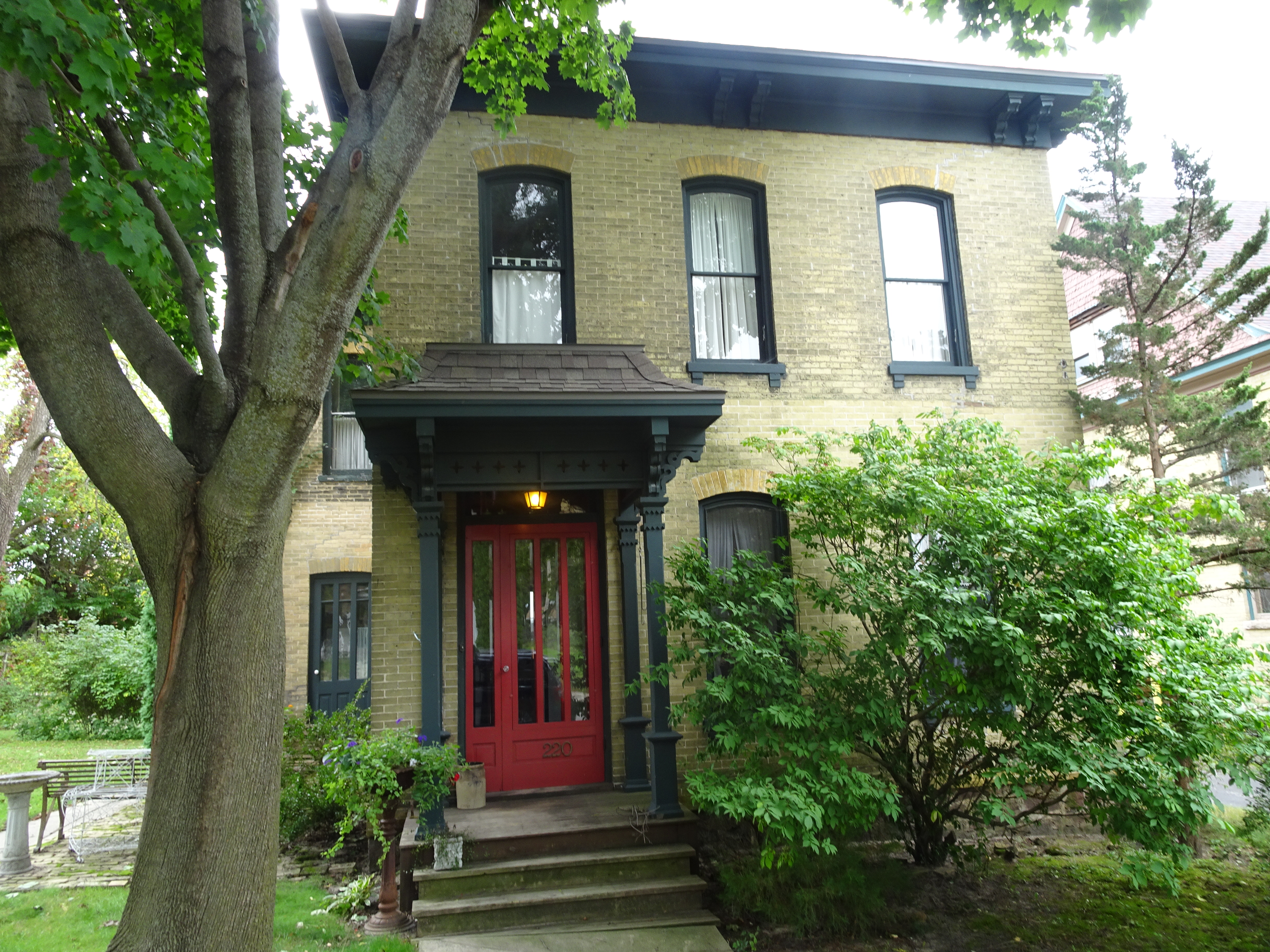
E.W. Farrington House

- The 1881 E.W. Farrington house at 220 W. Pleasant St. is a two-story cream brick home in Italianate style with a low hip roof with broad bracketed eaves, and a front porch with chamfered posts and a frieze. Farrington built the house and immediately sold it to O.D. Van Dusen, who owned lumber mills in Dorchester and a lumber yard in Portage, and later went into publishing.
- The 1883 Robert Thomson house at 131 E. Howard is an Italianate cream brick house with corner quoins, a low-pitched hip roof, and broad eaves, but also with an emphasis on vertical which gives it a Gothic Revival flavor. Thomson was a cattle dealer.
- The home at 208 W. Howard was built in 1884, a two-story cream brick Italianate-styled home with a low pyramidal roof. It was built for Miss Julliette W. Treadway, and later owned by D.G. Muir and William T. Muir. David Muir was a partner in a drugstore/mercantile which sold dry goods, clothing, boots, shoes, hats and caps.
- The 1892 C.D. Maine house at 513 Dewitt is a two-story cream brick Queen Anne-styled house with multiple steep gables, ornately decorated with bargeboards, a two-story canted bay, and an oriel window. James Baird lived in the house from 1905 to the 1920s. Baird owned Portage Iron Works, which made agricultural equipment, ornamental cast iron, and later shifted to automobile repair.
- The 1893 First Presbyterian Church at 120 W. Pleasant St. was designed in Richardsonian Romanesque style, with multiple rooflines, cream brick walls, wood shingling, Palladian windows, and buttresses.
- The 1897 Otto Krisch house at 235 W. Pleasant St. is an elaborately detailed 2.5-story cream brick Queen Anne with closed, projecting gables, stickwork, colonettes, a two-story bay, and a wrap-around porch. Krisch was an immigrant from Austria who reached Portage in 1854 and started a grocery three years later. Krisch was musical, active in the Portage Leiderkranz and Turnverein. Krisch died before the house was finished. Jacob Leisch lived in the house from 1910; he was a partner in a tailor shop in Portage, which was one of the biggest in Wisconsin outside Milwaukee.
- The 1898 St. John's Episcopal Church was designed by I. Jay Knapp of Milwaukee in Neogothic style with a side steeple and rose window.
- The 1900 Hugh G. Lewis house at 105 E. Pleasant St. (at right in photo) is a 2.5-story cream brick Queen Anne designed by C.H. Williams of Pardeeville. It has many asymmetric gables, some with shingles and Palladian windows. It also has bay windows, metal roof cresting, and a pedimented front porch. Lewis ran a hardware store from 1895 to 1910, and after that dealt in farm equipment and hardware.
- William S. Stroud bought the property at 207-209 W. Howard in 1892 and replaced or remodeled the house that was already there by 1901. The result is an early Dutch Colonial Revival style home with the hallmark gambrel roof and classic styling. Stroud had law offices in Wisconsin Dells and Portage, and served as district attorney and as a judge for Columbia County.
- The 1904 Porter house at 101 E. Pleasant St. is a 2.5-story frame Queen Anne with a 2.5-story bay window, a wrap-around porch, stickwork, elaborate brackets, and recessed windows with small Ionic columns. Arthur Amasa Porter ran a grocery, served as Register of Deeds and postmaster, became a realtor and developer, and ran the Wisconsin State Register until 1942.
- The 1904 James R. Patterson house at 224 W. Pleasant St. is a 2.5-story frame Queen Anne designed by F.L. Lindsay with closed gables supported by brackets, bargeboards, leaded glass windows, and a front porch with fluted columns. Patterson worked at Portage Hosiery.
- The 1907 S.M. Smith house at 110 E. Howard St. is a 2.5-story frame Queen Anne with vertical emphasis, shingles in the gables, and a pedimented front porch. Silas Smith had a law, abstract, real estate, load and insurance business.
- The 1913 Wallace A. Murison house at 202 W. Howard St. is a 2.5-story American Foursquare-style house with the horizontal lines and colors of Prairie School, clad in tile and stucco. Murison was a partner in a family cabinet-making, undertaking, and furniture business.
- The 1917 Andy Slinger house at 116 W. Howard St is a two-story frame American Foursquare house with broad eaves and a front porch. Slinger was part-owner of Portage Iron Works, which became Slinger Foundry, Machine, and Auto Co.
- The 1925 Emily A. Zimmerman house at 123 E. Howard St. is a 1.5-story bungalow with a large gable-roofed dormer, knee braces under the eaves, and an enclosed porch.
- The Church of Christ Scientist at 417 W. Wisconsin St. was built in 1933 by the local Christian Science Society, designed by Charles William Valentine of Milwaukee in Georgian Revival style, clad in limestone with a semi-circular portico and topped with a three-stage tower.

The district contains examples of various architectural styles, and a typical progression is seen in the list above. The NRHP also considers the district significant for social history, since the five churches of the district contributed to unify the community, cutting across class and ethnicity.
