= Patrick and Margaret Kinney House =

Historic house in Wisconsin, United States

- U.S. National Register of Historic Places
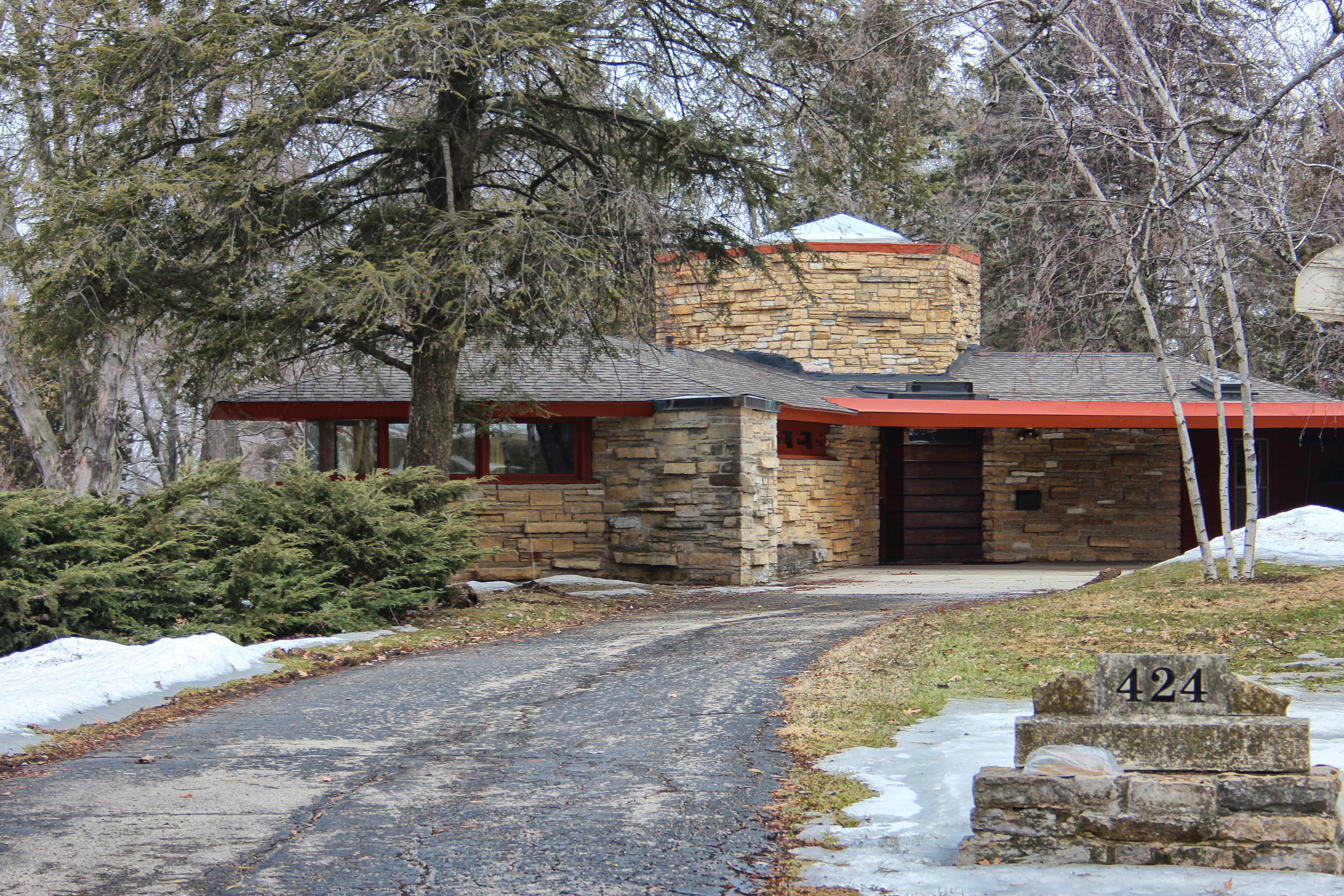
- Patrick and Margaret Kinney House
- Location: 424 N. Fillmore St., Lancaster, Wisconsin
- Coordinates: 42°51′06″N 90°43′10″W
- Area: 2.9 acres (1.2 ha)
- Built: 1951-1953, 1964
- Architect: Frank Lloyd Wright/John H. Howe
- Architectural style: Modern Movement
- NRHP reference No.: 08000160
- Added to NRHP: March 6, 2008

The Patrick and Margaret Kinney House was designed by architect Frank Lloyd Wright and it was built in 1951. The home is located in Lancaster, Wisconsin. The house was added to the State Register of Historic Places in 2007 and to the National Register of Historic Places the following year.

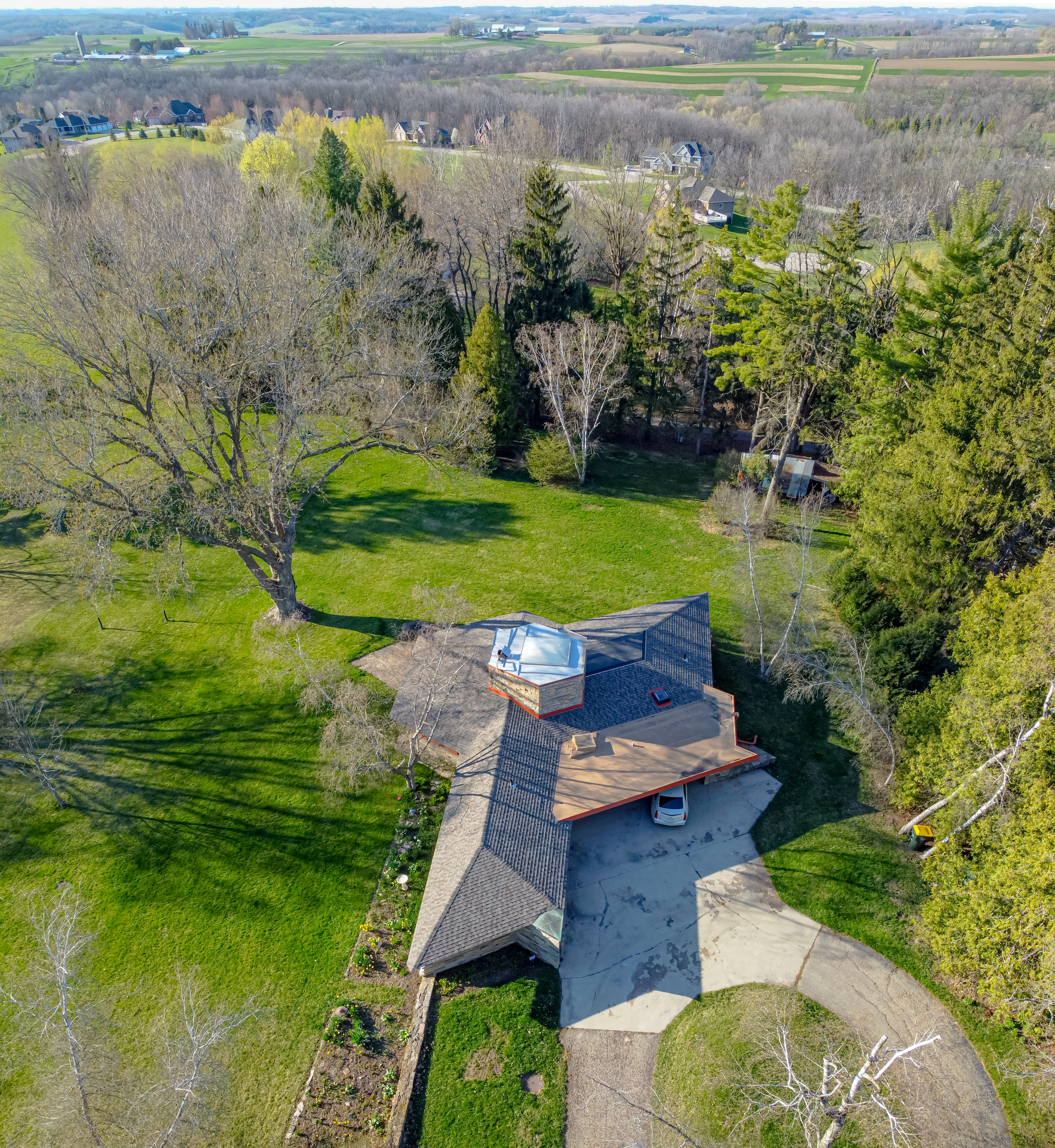

== History ==
Patrick Kinney and his wife, Margaret, built the house to raise their three children in. They hired Wright as the architect because Margaret had worked for Wright's sister, Jane Porter, while a college student. Patrick Kinney, a prominent lawyer, worked as the general contractor on the building in order to cut down on costs. Additionally, while Wright suggested the building should be made out of concrete blocks, the Kinneys decided on using stone. Every day Patrick Kinney "would be up at the crack of dawn and quarry two loads of stone and deliver them to the site... before heading off to court or the office."

The building is set on a grid of 30-and 60-degree equilateral parallelograms with the master bedroom as a hexagon at the head, with the children's bedrooms coming off of it. It was originally designed with two, instead of three, children's bedrooms because Wright misunderstood how many children the Kinneys had. Therefore, his apprentice, John H. "Jack" Howe, later enlarged the building.

== See also ==
- List of Frank Lloyd Wright works
- National Register of Historic Places listings in Grant County, Wisconsin
