= F. A. Chadbourn House =

Historic house in Wisconsin, United States

- U.S. National Register of Historic Places
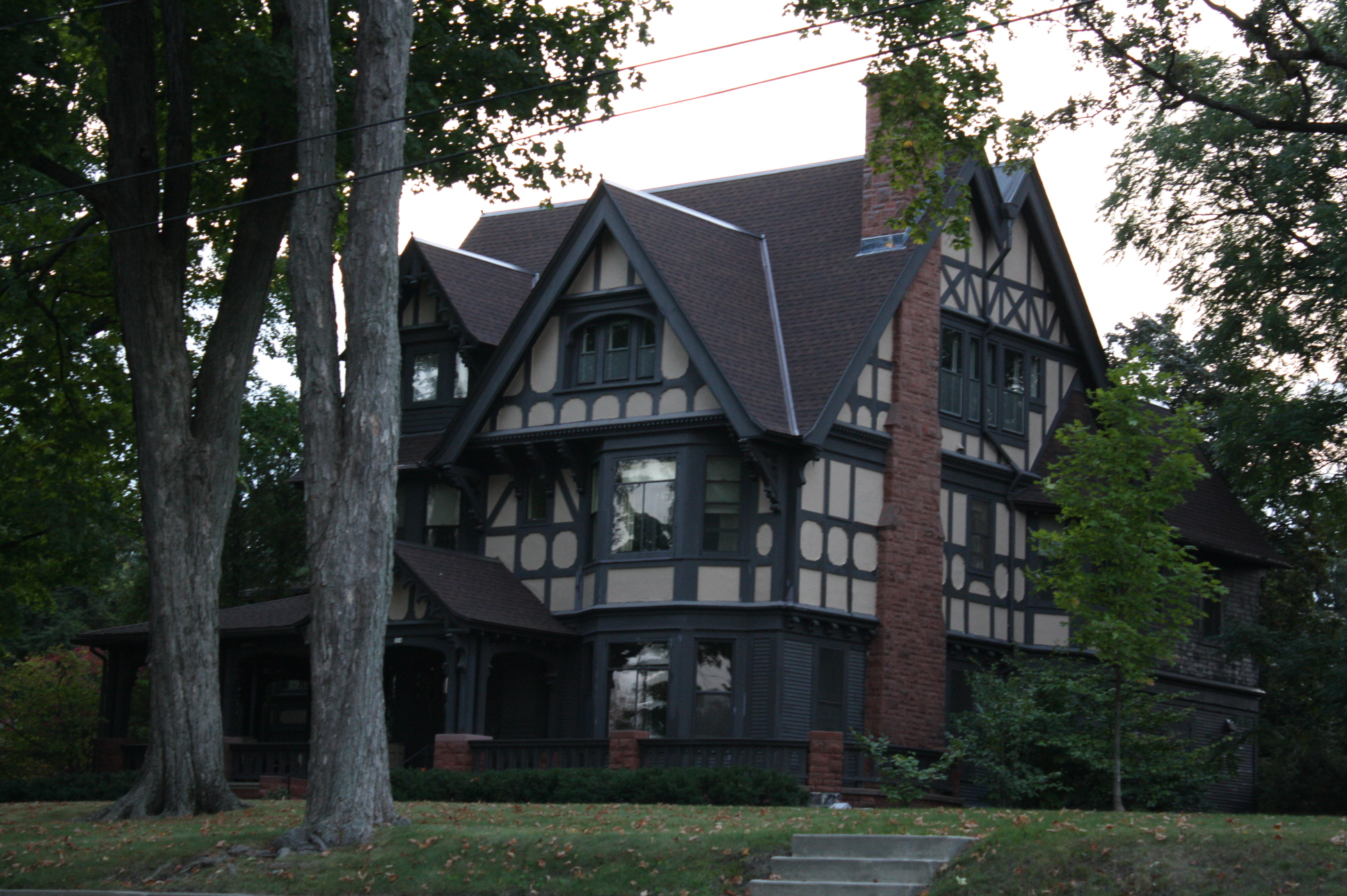
- F. A. Chadbourn House

- Location within Wisconsin
- Location: 314 S. Charles St., Columbus, Wisconsin
- Coordinates: 43°20′28″N 89°01′24″W
- Area: less than one acre
- Built: 1900
- Architect: Van Ryn & DeGelleke
- Architectural style: Tudor Revival
- NRHP reference No.: 90001961
- Added to NRHP: December 28, 1990

The F. A. Chadbourn House is a historic house at 314 S. Charles Street in Columbus, Wisconsin. The house is accompanied by a carriage house.

== Description ==
Frederick A. Chadbourn was the son of R. W. Chadbourn, founder of the First National Bank of Columbus, and he and several of his family members were involved with the bank. His house, built in 1900, was one of five built by the Chadbourn family in the surrounding neighborhood. Architects Van Ryn & DeGelleke of Milwaukee designed the wood-sided Tudor Revival house. The two-and-a-half story house features a front porch with Gothic arches and details, decorative half-timbering on the upper stories, and a steep roof with several gables. Chadbourn lived in the house until his death in 1947; his wife Gertrude continued to live there until her death in 1952.
