= Miss Lulu Bett (play) =

Miss Lulu Bett is a 1920 play adapted by American author Zona Gale from her novel of the same title.

== Production ==
Miss Lulu Bett premiered on Broadway at the Belmont Theatre on December 27, 1920, and closed on June 18, 1921, after 198 performances. Directed by Brock Pemberton, the cast featured Carroll McComas as Lulu Bett, Louise Closser Hale (Mrs. Bett), William E. Holden (Dwight Herbert Deacon), and Willard Robertson (Neil Cornish).

The play won the 1921 Pulitzer Prize for Drama. In the foreword to the script, Robert C. Benchley wrote: "Miss Gale has violated many sacred dramatic rules. She has given us characters who talk as people really talk and who therefore are dull... The result of such adherence to uninspiring reality might well have been expected to be a failure in its appeal to an uninspiring nation of theater-goers. But Miss Gale took the chance. She wrote the play, as she had written the book, without compromise, and was rewarded by an enthusiastic public."

== Characters ==
- Lulu Bett – a spinster in her 30s, she lives with her sister and brother-in-law and their children
- Mrs. Bett – Lulu's and Ina's mother who also lives in the household
- Ina – Lulu's sister
- Dwight Deacon – Lulu's brother-in-law
- Mr. Cornish – a suiter for both Lulu and the young daughter of the Deacons, Di; he owns his own business
- Ninian Deacon – Dwight's brother who has not been with the family for many years, he has been living in South and Central America
- Monona - Dwight and Ina's youngest daughter
- Diana (Di) - Dwight and Ina's older daughter; dating Bobby Larkin
- Bobby Larkin - Di's suitor; a lower-class youth in town

== Film ==
The play and novel were the basis of the film of the same name, released in 1921. Directed by William C. deMille, the cast featured Lois Wilson (Lulu Bett), Milton Sills (Neil Cornish), Theodore “Daddy” Roberts (Dwight Deacon), Helen Ferguson (Diana Deacon), and Ethel Wales (Grandma Bett).
