= Portage Historic District (disambiguation) =

Portage Historic District is a national historic district located in Portage, Pennsylvania.

Portage Historic District may also refer to:

- Portage Industrial Waterfront Historic District in Portage, Wisconsin
- Portage Retail Historic District in Portage, Wisconsin
- Portage Street Historic District in Lodi, Wisconsin
