= Miss Lulu Bett (film) =

1921 film by William C. deMille

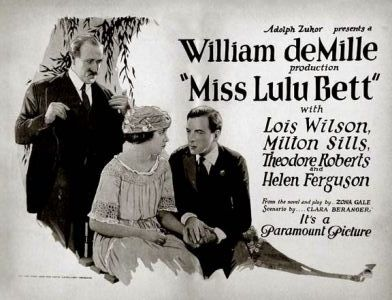
- 1921 lobby card
- Directed by: William C. deMille
- Written by: Clara Beranger
- Based on: Miss Lulu Bett 1920 novel by Zona Gale; Miss Lulu Bett 1920 play by Brock Pemberton (director)
- Produced by: Adolph Zukor
- Starring: Lois Wilson; Milton Sills; Theodore Roberts; Helen Ferguson
- Cinematography: L. Guy Wilky
- Production company: Famous Players–Lasky Corporation
- Distributed by: Paramount Pictures
- Release date: November 1, 1921 (Nationwide)
- Running time: 71 minutes
- Country: United States
- Language: Silent (English intertitles)

Miss Lulu Bett

Miss Lulu Bett is a 1921 American silent comedy drama film based on a 1920 play and bestselling novel of the same name by Zona Gale. The screenplay was written by Clara Beranger, and the film was directed by William C. deMille. The play won the 1921 Pulitzer Prize for Drama.

In 2001, this film was deemed "culturally, historically, or aesthetically significant" by the United States Library of Congress and selected for preservation in the National Film Registry.

== Plot ==
As described in a film magazine, Lulu Bett is a slave in the home of her married half-sister Ina Deacon. Her life of drudgery is interrupted when Ninian Deacon, the scapegoat brother of the head of the house Dwight Deacon, "accidentally" marries her. After he confesses that he has another wife, LuLu leaves him and Dwight allows her to return. Her persecution is redoubled upon her return, but she received courage after telling her story to the town schoolmaster Neil Cornish, who falls in love with her. Her final rebellion and departure from the household are followed by the news that her marriage to Ninian was not legal, leaving her free to marry the man that she loves.

== Cast ==
- Lois Wilson as Lulu Bett
- Milton Sills as Neil Cornish
- Theodore Roberts as Dwight Deacon
- Helen Ferguson as Diana Deacon
- Mabel Van Buren as Ina Deacon
- Mae Giraci as Monona Deacon (credited as May Giraci)
- Clarence Burton as Ninian Deacon
- Ethel Wales as Grandma Bett
- Taylor Graves as Bobby Larkin
- Charles Ogle as Station Agent

uncredited

- Peaches Jackson as Child
- Carrie Clark Ward as Gossip

== Historical relevance ==
Miss Lulu Bett depicts a transition that was prominent during the early 1920s women's suffrage movement. It displays women beginning to assert their independence. It also conveys how women often lived oppressive lives during this time, and explores the spinster stereotype. Although Lulu was not abused physically, she is abused psychologically by her controlling brother-in-law, who Lulu works under and visibly dislikes. When the story was adopted as a play, two endings were written; one where Lulu decides to undertake adventures on her own, which won Gale the Pulitzer Prize, and another where Neil shows up in the nick of time and convinces her to stay with him. The latter was more commercially acceptable at the time and less challenging for audiences given women's standing in society.

In the film, although Lulu and Neil decide to get married, Lulu still evolves from slavery into a self-assured woman, prepared to take on her life independently. In accordance with Gale's original ending depicting female independence, she personally advocated heavily for women's rights and was an ardent supporter of many liberal causes of her time. She was an active member of the National Women's Party and lobbied diligently for the 1921 Wisconsin Equal Rights Law. Additionally, she was an Executive Member of the Lucy Stone League – one of the first feminist groups to arise from the suffrage movement. She believed that her activism on behalf of women was her way to solve a “problem she returned to repeatedly in her novels: women’s frustration at their lack of opportunities.”

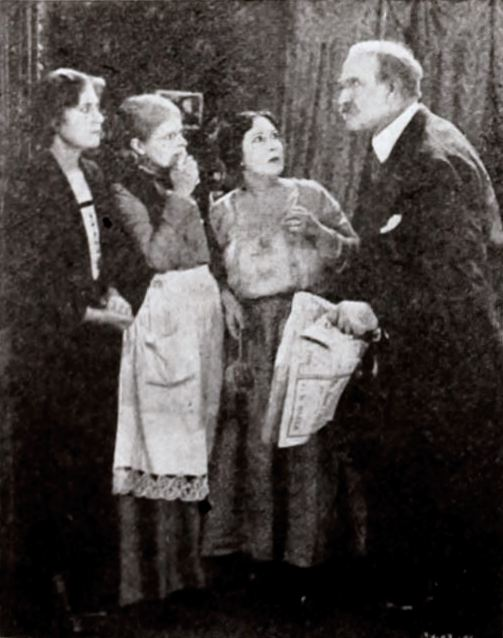
Lulu standing up to her brother-in-law
