= Society Hill Historic District =

Society Hill Historic District may refer to:

- Society Hill Historic District (Philadelphia, Pennsylvania), listed on the NRHP in Pennsylvania
- Society Hill Historic District (Portage, Wisconsin), listed on the NRHP in Wisconsin
