= Society Hill Historic District (Portage, Wisconsin) =

Historic district in Wisconsin, United States

- U.S. National Register of Historic Places
- U.S. Historic district
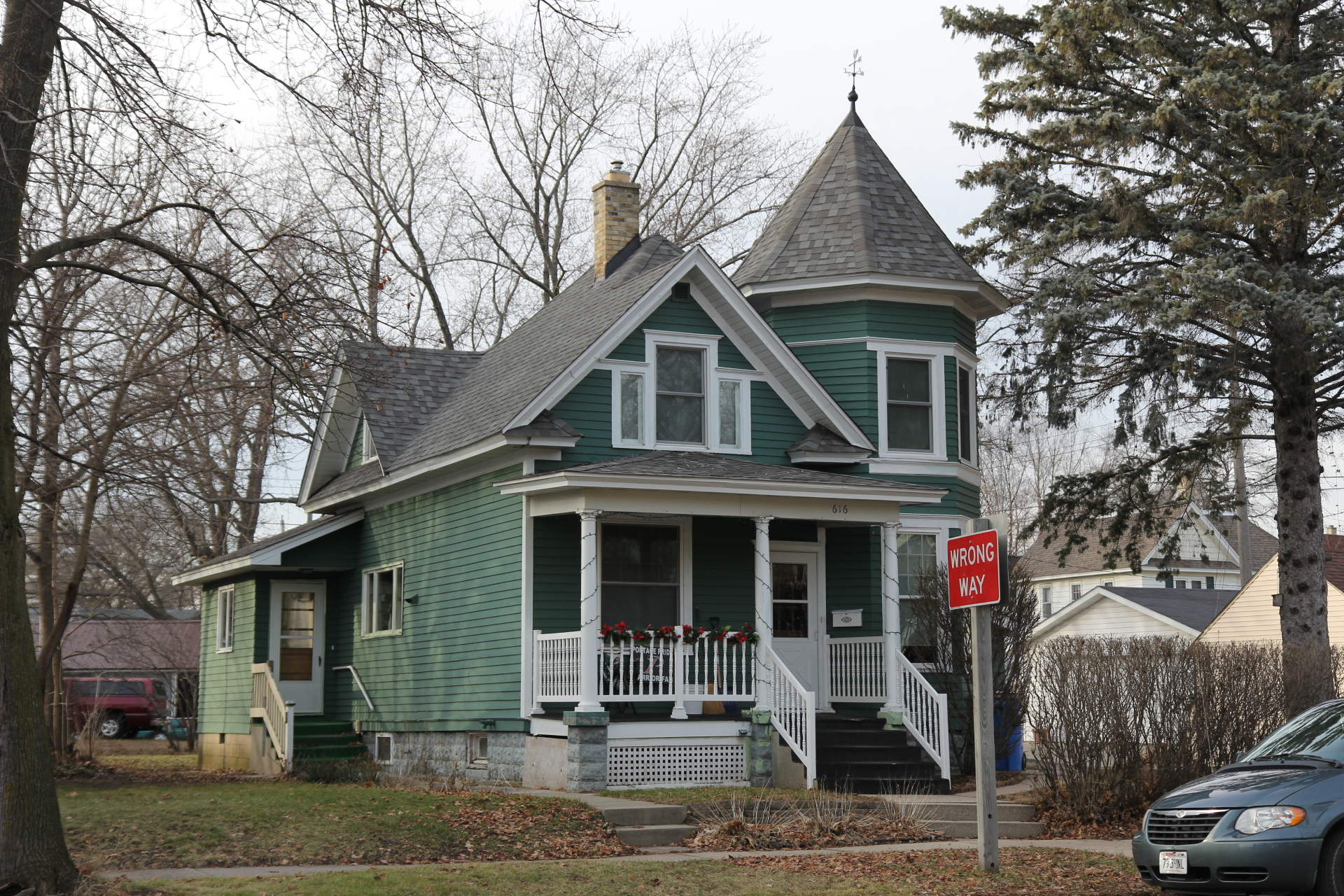

- Location within Wisconsin Location within the United States
- Location: Roughly bounded by W. Wisconsin, Cass and W. Emmett Sts. and MacFarlane Rd., Portage, Wisconsin
- Coordinates: 43°32′34″N 89°28′01″W
- Area: 40 acres (16 ha)
- Architect: Heimerl, Julius
- Architectural style: Greek Revival, Italianate, Queen Anne
- NRHP reference No.: 92000112
- Added to NRHP: March 5, 1992

The Society Hill Historic District was added to the National Register of Historic Places in 1992 for its architectural significance.

== Description ==
Most houses in the district were constructed between 1870 and 1910. The Chicago, Milwaukee and St. Paul train station was located near-by. Houses within the district include the homes of Zona Gale and Frederick Jackson Turner.
