= Zona Gale House =

Historic house in Wisconsin, United States

- U.S. National Register of Historic Places
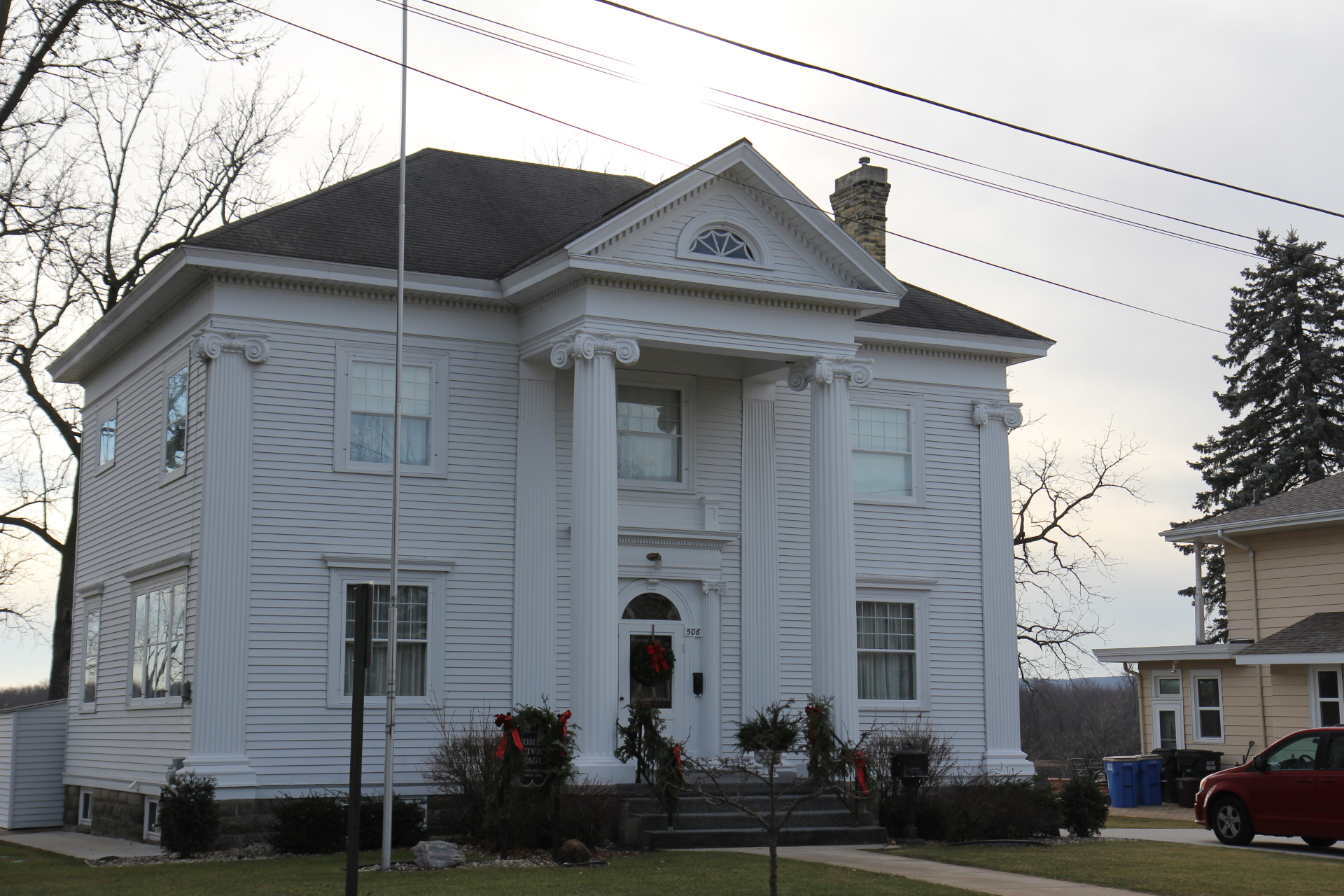
- Zona Gale House in 2014

- Location within Wisconsin Location within the United States
- Location: 506 W. Edgewater St., Portage, Wisconsin
- Coordinates: 43°32′17″N 89°28′3″W
- Area: 0.2 acres (0.081 ha)
- Built: 1906
- Architectural style: Late 19th And 20th Century Revivals
- NRHP reference No.: 80000113
- Added to NRHP: October 24, 1980

The Zona Gale House is a historic house located at 506 West Edgewater Street in Portage, Wisconsin. It is locally and generally significant for its association with literature and unique architecture.

== Description and history ==
The 2 1/2-story house was built by Zona Gale in 1906 as a gift to her parents; Gale was the first woman to win the Pulitzer Prize for Drama. It is located in Portage, Wisconsin. The house was added to the National Register of Historic Places in 1980 for its significance in literature and architecture.
