= Portage Retail Historic District =

Historic district in Wisconsin, United States

- U.S. National Register of Historic Places
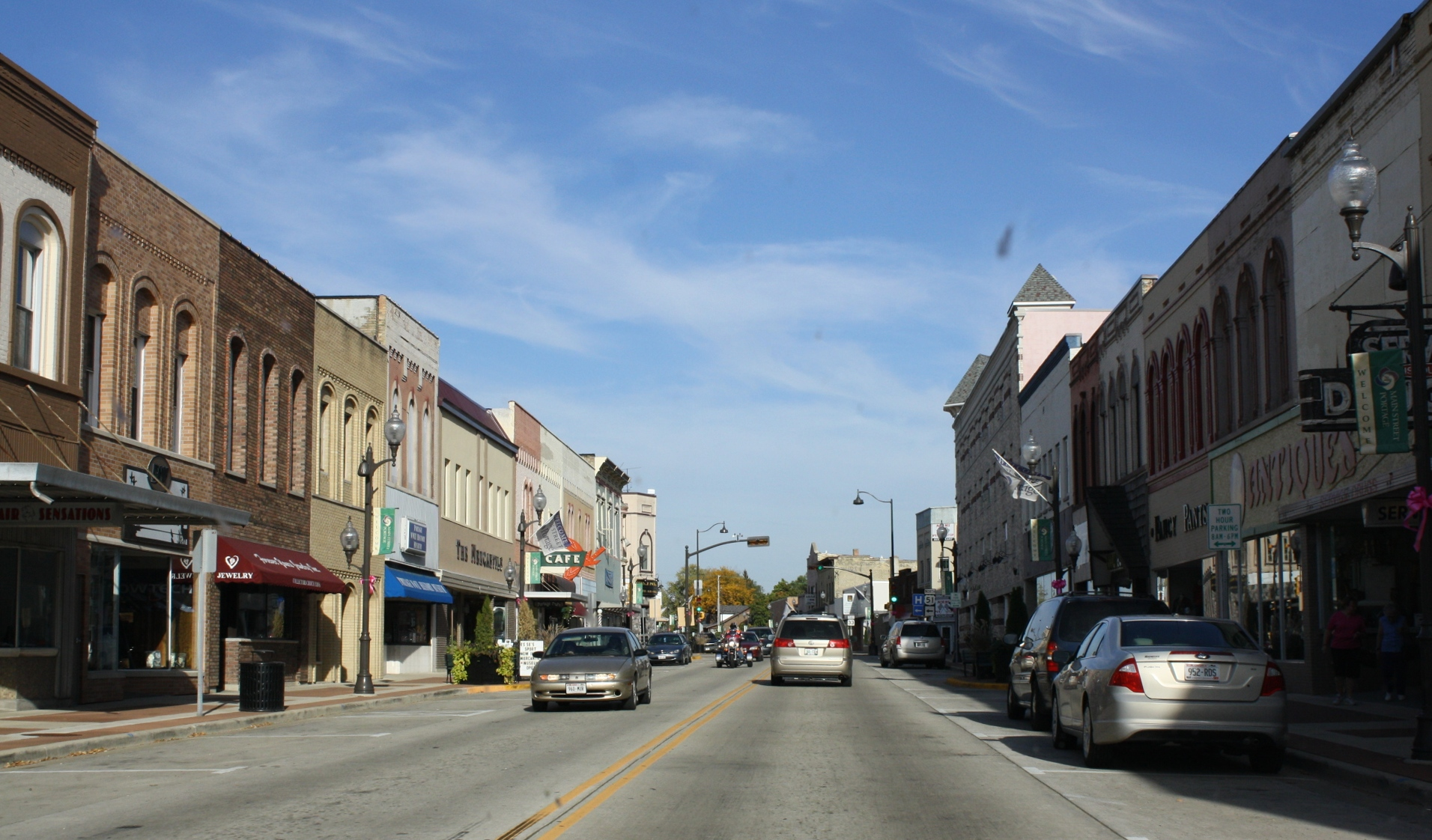
- A portion of the district.
- Location: Roughly, Cook from Wisconsin to Main, Wisconsin from Cook to Edgewater and DeWith from Conant to Edgewater, Portage, Wisconsin
- Coordinates: 43.53993°N 89.45958°W
- Area: 14 acres (5.7 ha)
- NRHP reference No.: 95000510
- Added to NRHP: April 27, 1995

The Portage Retail Historic District is located in Portage, Wisconsin.

== Description ==
The site is a business district located near the Portage Canal. Buildings within the district include the 1866 Italianate City Brewery, the 1873 Italianate Graham Drug Company, the 1881 Italianate Williams Shoes and Harness shop, the 1889 Queen Anne Hillyer Block (which housed the High Priced Grocery), the 1891 3-story Italianate Beattie Block, the 1927 Georgian Revival Portage Theater, the 1927 Ram Hotel, and the 1929 Art Deco City Bank of Portage. It was added to the State Register of Historic Places in 1994 and to the National Register of Historic Places the following year.
