= Portage Industrial Waterfront Historic District =

Historic district in Wisconsin, United States

- U.S. National Register of Historic Places
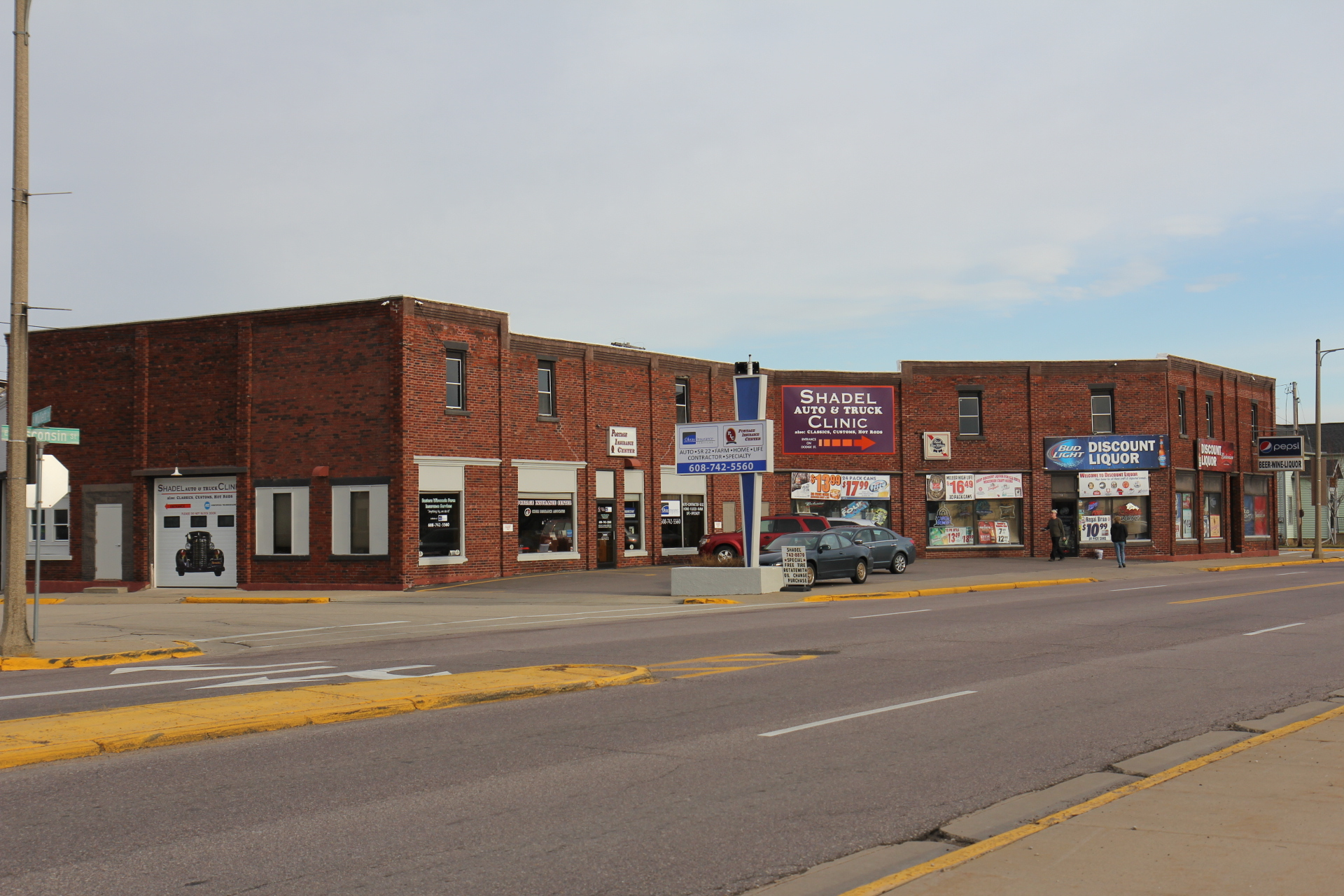
- A portion of the district.
- Location: Jct. of E. Mullet and Dodge Sts., Portage, Wisconsin
- Coordinates: 43°32′20″N 89°27′24″W
- Area: 4 acres (1.6 ha)
- Built: 1862
- NRHP reference No.: 95000257
- Added to NRHP: March 17, 1995

The Portage Industrial Waterfront Historic District is in Portage, Wisconsin.

== Description ==
The district includes several commercial structures in the low-lying area along the Portage Canal. Among them are the 1862 Wentworth Grain Elevator, the 1881 Portage Hosiery complex, the 1891 Portage Iron Works, the 1916 T.H. Cochrane Company Warehouse, and the 1920 Hyland Garage.
