= Portage, Wisconsin =

- City
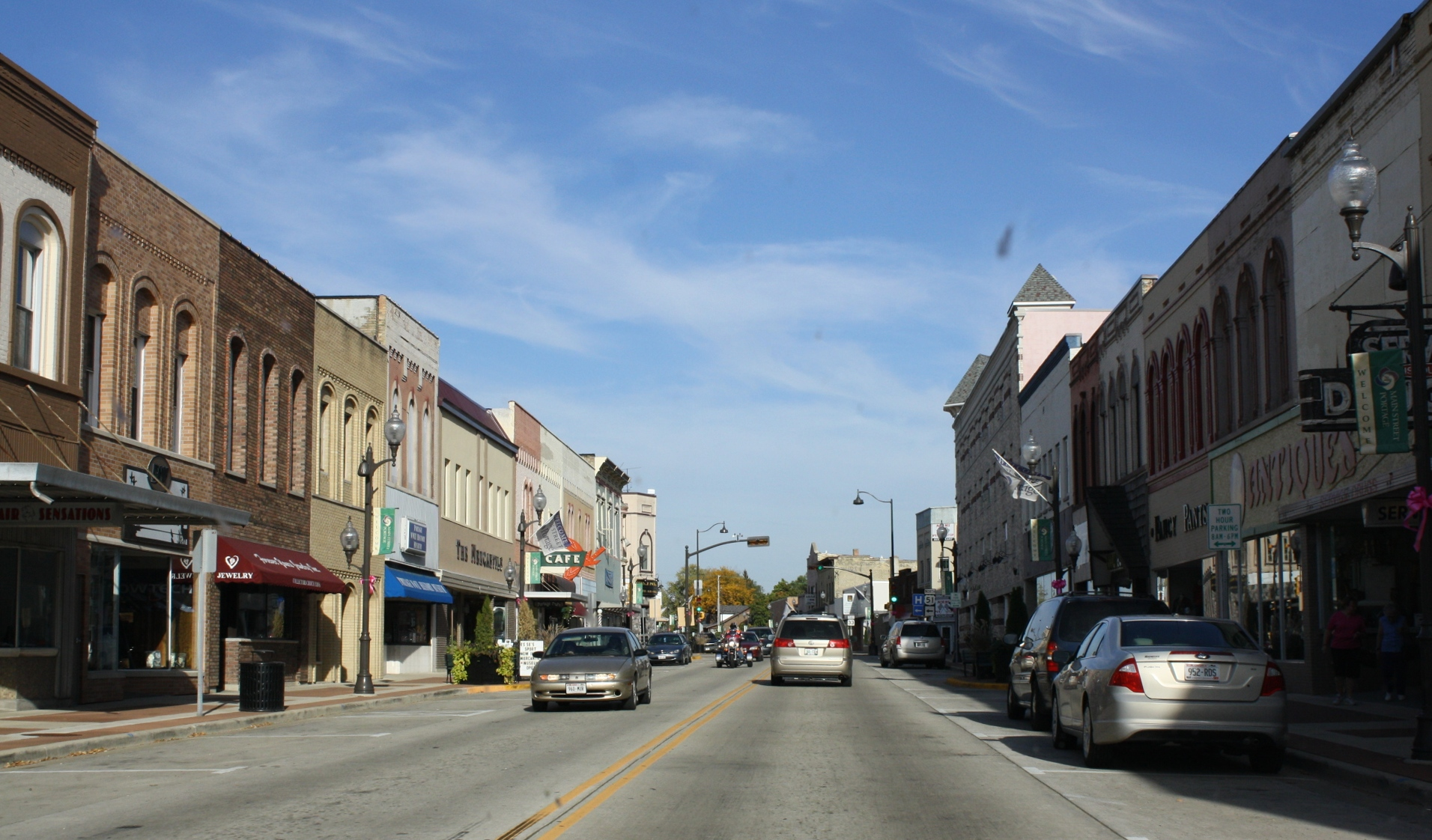
- Downtown Portage
- Motto: "Where the North Begins"
- Location of Portage in Columbia County, Wisconsin

- Location within Wisconsin Location within the United States
- Coordinates: 43°33′N 89°28′W
- Country: United States
- State: Wisconsin
- County: Columbia
- Settled: 1851

Area
  - Total: 9.71 sq mi (25.14 km^{2})
  - Land: 8.91 sq mi (23.07 km^{2})
  - Water: 0.80 sq mi (2.07 km^{2})
- Elevation: 794 ft (242 m)

Population (2020)
  - Total: 10,581
  - Density: 1,188/sq mi (458.6/km^{2})
- Time zone: UTC-6 (Central (CST))
  - Summer (DST): UTC-5 (CDT)
- ZIP Code: 53901
- Area code: 608
- FIPS code: 55-64100
- GNIS feature ID: 1571799
- Website: www.portagewi.gov

Portage is a city in Columbia County, Wisconsin, United States, and its county seat. The population was 10,581 at the 2020 census, making it the largest city in Columbia County. It is part of the Madison metropolitan area.

Portage was named for the Fox–Wisconsin Waterway, a portage between the Fox River and the Wisconsin River, which was recognized by Jacques Marquette and Louis Jolliet during their discovery of a route to the Mississippi River in 1673. The city's slogan is "Where the North Begins."

== History ==
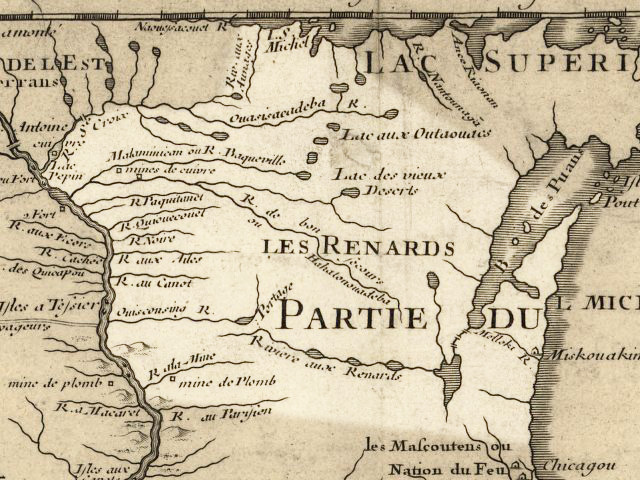
Wisconsin in 1718, Guillaume de L'Isle map, showing the historic portage

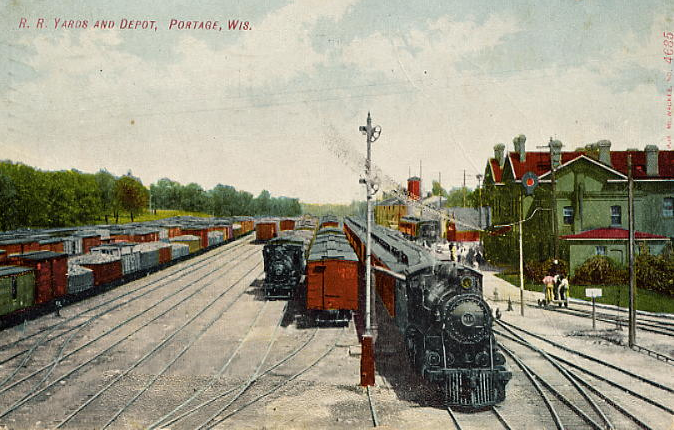
Portage station, c. 1900

The Native American tribes that once lived here, and later the European traders and settlers, took advantage of the lowlands between the Fox and Wisconsin Rivers as a natural "portage". This is reflected in indigenous names for the town, such as the Menominee name Kahkāmohnakaneh, which means "at the short cut". In May 1673, Jacques Marquette joined the expedition of Louis Jolliet, a French-Canadian explorer, to find the Mississippi River. They departed from St. Ignace on May 17, with two canoes and five voyageurs of French-Indian ancestry (Métis). They followed Lake Michigan to Green Bay and up the Fox River, nearly to its headwaters. From there, they were told to portage their canoes a distance of slightly less than two miles through marsh and oak plains to the Wisconsin River. Later, French fur traders described the place as "le portage", which eventually lent itself to the name of the community. As a portage, this community developed as a center of commerce and trade; later, a canal was constructed to facilitate this trade. When the railroads came through, the community continued in this role.

Portage emerged at this place because of its unique position along the one and a half mile strip of marshy floodplain between the Fox and Wisconsin Rivers. By the end of the 17th century, the Fox-Wisconsin waterway, linked at the Portage, served as the major fur trade thoroughfare between Green Bay and Prairie du Chien. It was not until the 1780s and 1790s that traders built their posts and warehouses at each end of the Portage. In the early 19th century Portage was primarily populated by Métis. In 1828, the federal government recognized the strategic economic importance of The Portage and built Fort Winnebago at the Fox River end. After 15 years of controversy, Winnebago settlement (now Portage) won the county seat in 1851. The community incorporated as Portage City in 1854.

The Portage business district lies along a hill that overlooks the Portage Canal. The buildings now in the city's downtown were once part of a bustling, urban commercial center serving a large region across north central Wisconsin. The building of the city paralleled its commercial prominence between the end of the American Civil War and the second decade of the 20th century.

=== Historic sites ===
- Fort Winnebago Surgeon's Quarters Historic Site
- Fox-Wisconsin Portage Site
- Henry Merrell House
- Old Indian Agency House
- Portage Industrial Waterfront Historic District
- Portage Retail Historic District
- Zona Gale House
- Museum at the Portage
- Wisconsin American Legion Museum and Learning Center
- Portage Canal Society
- Historic Portage Canal
- World War II History Museum
- Wisconsin State Historical Markers in Portage
  - Fort Winnebago Surgeon's Quarters Historic Site
  - Frederick Jackson Turner
  - Jacques Marquette
  - Jacques Marquette and Louis Jolliet
  - Ketchum's Point
  - Potter's Emigration Society
  - Society Hill Historic District
  - Zona Gale
- Veterans memorials
  - Revolutionary War Veteran (Cooper Pixley and Alexander Porter)
  - To Honor Pierre Pauquette
  - To the Memory of Our Historic Dead
- Daughters of the American Revolution Historic Markers
  - Site of Fort Winnebago / Surrender of Red Bird
  - Pierre Pauquette and East End of Wauona Trail
  - Landing Place of the Ferry built by Pierre Pauquette

== Geography ==
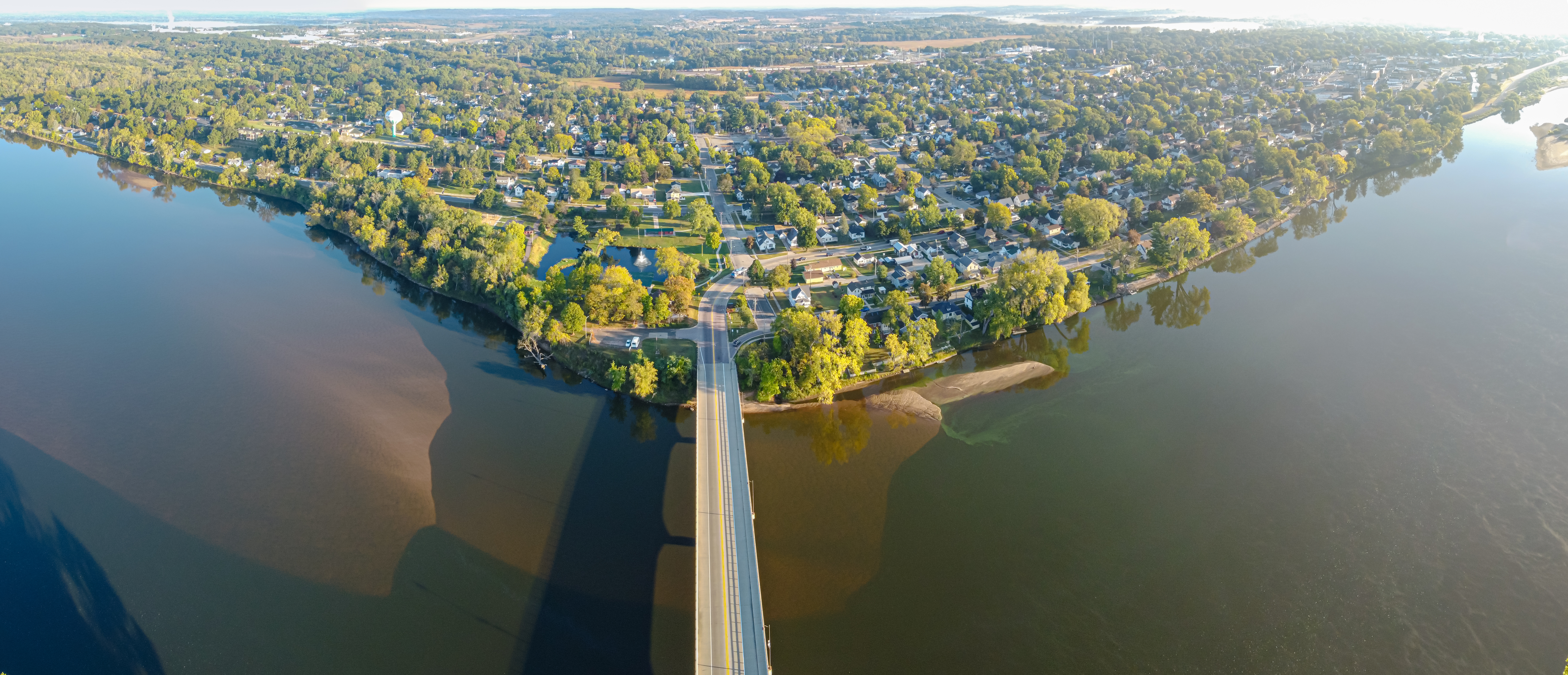
Wis-33 entering Portage over the Wisconsin River

Portage lies in the Wisconsin River valley. The city is surrounded by prairies and grasslands. Approximately three miles (5 km) west of the city are the Baraboo bluffs. According to the United States Census Bureau, the city has a total area of 9.62 square miles (24.92 km^{2}), of which, 8.82 square miles (22.84 km^{2}) is land and 0.8 square miles (2.07 km^{2}) is water. The location of the town at the split of the Wisconsin and Fox river is what gives it the name "Portage", which means carrying a boat and its cargo between two navigable waters. In addition to the rivers, the city has access to Swan Lake and Silver Lake.

=== Cityscape ===
When Portage was first established, the streets were laid out on a traditional grid system. Today, the streets of the outlying city are contorted as a result of the many marshes and lowlands that run through much of Columbia County. The northern side of the city thus looks different from the central city, with the organized grid street system giving way to a more suburban streetscape with a lower housing density.

The city has two commercial areas. One is the downtown historic district, which features several small boutique shops and restaurants; the other is the Northridge commercial area that features big box stores. In the summer of 2007, the Portage Canal was cleaned up and now features a bike path that runs alongside part of it. In the summer of 2008, the main downtown street was redone. Historical landmarks of the city include the Museum at the Portage, the Indian Agency house, and the Surgeons Quarters.

== Climate ==
Climate data for Portage Wastewater Treatment Plant, Wisconsin (1991–2020 normals, extremes 1896–present)
Month	Jan	Feb	Mar	Apr	May	Jun	Jul	Aug	Sep	Oct	Nov	Dec	Year
Record high °F (°C)	57 (14)	72 (22)	83 (28)	99 (37)	102 (39)	104 (40)	111 (44)	103 (39)	103 (39)	93 (34)	76 (24)	67 (19)	111 (44)
Mean maximum °F (°C)	45.7 (7.6)	51.7 (10.9)	66.3 (19.1)	77.9 (25.5)	85.9 (29.9)	90.8 (32.7)	92.1 (33.4)	90.7 (32.6)	87.5 (30.8)	79.9 (26.6)	64.5 (18.1)	50.6 (10.3)	94.3 (34.6)
Mean daily maximum °F (°C)	26.1 (−3.3)	30.6 (−0.8)	42.4 (5.8)	55.7 (13.2)	68.2 (20.1)	77.9 (25.5)	81.6 (27.6)	79.9 (26.6)	72.6 (22.6)	59.3 (15.2)	44.2 (6.8)	31.8 (−0.1)	55.9 (13.3)
Daily mean °F (°C)	18 (−8)	21.9 (−5.6)	33.2 (0.7)	45.8 (7.7)	58 (14)	67.9 (19.9)	71.6 (22.0)	69.6 (20.9)	61.6 (16.4)	49.2 (9.6)	36.3 (2.4)	24.4 (−4.2)	46.5 (8.1)
Mean daily minimum °F (°C)	9.9 (−12.3)	13.2 (−10.4)	24 (−4)	35.8 (2.1)	47.8 (8.8)	57.9 (14.4)	61.6 (16.4)	59.4 (15.2)	50.7 (10.4)	39 (4)	28.3 (−2.1)	17.1 (−8.3)	37.1 (2.8)
Mean minimum °F (°C)	−11.7 (−24.3)	−7.8 (−22.1)	3.2 (−16.0)	22.4 (−5.3)	34.1 (1.2)	44.3 (6.8)	51.1 (10.6)	47.7 (8.7)	36.5 (2.5)	25.9 (−3.4)	13 (−11)	−2.6 (−19.2)	−15.2 (−26.2)
Record low °F (°C)	−35 (−37)	−37 (−38)	−25 (−32)	5 (−15)	20 (−7)	29 (−2)	37 (3)	33 (1)	17 (−8)	8 (−13)	−10 (−23)	−24 (−31)	−37 (−38)
Average precipitation inches (mm)	1.44 (37)	1.41 (36)	2.18 (55)	4.15 (105)	4.58 (116)	5.61 (142)	4.51 (115)	4.12 (105)	3.56 (90)	2.86 (73)	2.22 (56)	1.68 (43)	38.32 (973)
Average snowfall inches (cm)	10.2 (26)	10.0 (25)	5.5 (14)	2.2 (5.6)	0.0 (0.0)	0.0 (0.0)	0.0 (0.0)	0.0 (0.0)	0.0 (0.0)	0.5 (1.3)	2.0 (5.1)	8.9 (23)	39.3 (100)
Average precipitation days (≥ 0.01 in)	9.2	8.3	9.3	11.6	13.1	11.6	10.2	10.4	10.2	10.4	8.1	9.5	121.9
Average snowy days (≥ 0.1 in)	6.8	5.8	3.4	1.0	0.0	0.0	0.0	0.0	0.0	0.2	1.5	5.9	24.6
Source: NOAA

== Demographics ==
Historical population
Census	Pop.	Note	%±
1850	603		—
1860	2,879		377.4%
1870	3,945		37.0%
1880	4,346		10.2%
1890	5,143		18.3%
1900	5,459		6.1%
1910	5,440		−0.3%
1920	5,582		2.6%
1930	6,308		13.0%
1940	7,016		11.2%
1950	7,334		4.5%
1960	7,822		6.7%
1970	7,821		0.0%
1980	7,896		1.0%
1990	8,640		9.4%
2000	9,728		12.6%
2010	10,324		6.1%
2020	10,581		2.5%
U.S. Decennial Census

=== 2020 census ===
As of the 2020 census, Portage had a population of 10,581. The median age was 38.0 years. 20.0% of residents were under the age of 18 and 16.3% of residents were 65 years of age or older. For every 100 females there were 111.7 males, and for every 100 females age 18 and over there were 113.4 males age 18 and over.

92.7% of residents lived in urban areas, while 7.3% lived in rural areas.

There were 4,277 households in Portage, of which 26.4% had children under the age of 18 living in them. Of all households, 35.6% were married-couple households, 22.6% were households with a male householder and no spouse or partner present, and 31.6% were households with a female householder and no spouse or partner present. About 36.8% of all households were made up of individuals and 14.8% had someone living alone who was 65 years of age or older.

There were 4,588 housing units, of which 6.8% were vacant. The homeowner vacancy rate was 2.4% and the rental vacancy rate was 6.1%.

Racial composition as of the 2020 census
Race	Number	Percent
White	9,016	85.2%
Black or African American	587	5.5%
American Indian and Alaska Native	112	1.1%
Asian	124	1.2%
Native Hawaiian and Other Pacific Islander	2	0.0%
Some other race	209	2.0%
Two or more races	531	5.0%
Hispanic or Latino (of any race)	614	5.8%

=== 2010 census ===
As of the census of 2010, there were 10,324 people, 4,060 households, and 2,349 families living in the city. The population density was 1,170.5 inhabitants per square mile (451.9/km^{2}). There were 4,493 housing units at an average density of 509.4 per square mile (196.7/km^{2}). The racial makeup of the city was 90.9% White, 5% African American, 0.9% Native American, 0.8% Asian, 0.7% from other races, and 1.6% from two or more races. Hispanic or Latino people of any race were 4.0% of the population.

There were 4,060 households, of which 31% had children under the age of 18 living with them, 40.5% were married couples living together, 11.9% had a female householder with no husband present, 5.4% had a male householder with no wife present, and 42.1% were non-families. 34.8% of all households were made up of individuals, and 14.1% had someone living alone who was 65 years of age or older. The average household size was 2.27 and the average family size was 2.9.

The median age in the city was 37.2 years. 22.1% of residents were under the age of 18; 8.6% were between the ages of 18 and 24; 30.6% were from 25 to 44; 24.8% were from 45 to 64; and 13.9% were 65 years of age or older. The gender makeup of the city was 53.7% male and 46.3% female.

=== 2000 census ===
As of the census of 2000, there were 9,728 people, 3,770 households, and 2,228 families living in the city. The population density was 1,172.9 people per square mile (453.1/km^{2}). There were 3,970 housing units at an average density of 478.7 per square mile (184.9/km^{2}). The racial makeup of the city was 92.76% European-American, 3.90% African American, 0.51% Native American, 0.71% Asian, 0.05% Pacific Islander, 0.85% from other races, and 1.21% from two or more races. Hispanic or Latino people of any race were 3.39% of the population.

There were 3,770 households, out of which 30.1% had children under the age of 18 living with them, 44.5% were married couples living together, 10.7% had a female householder with no husband present, and 40.9% were non-families. 34.5% of all households were made up of individuals, and 14.4% had someone living alone who was 65 years of age or older. The average household size was 2.3 and the average family size was 2.96.

In the city, the population was spread out, with 23.3% under the age of 18, 10.6% from 18 to 24, 31.7% from 25 to 44, 19.3% from 45 to 64, and 15.2% who were 65 years of age or older. The median age was 36 years. For every 100 females, there were 106.1 males. For every 100 females age 18 and over, there were 108.7 males.

The median income for a household in the city was $35,815, and the median income for a family was $44,804. Males had a median income of $33,158 versus $23,478 for females. The per capita income for the city was $18,039. About 4.6% of families and 7.2% of the population were below the poverty line, including 7.5% of those under age 18 and 7.8% of those age 65 or over.

== Education ==
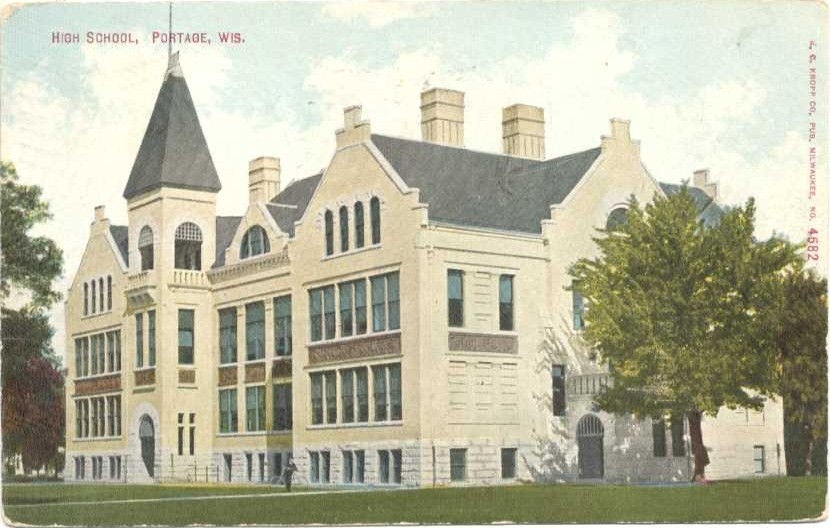
Portage High School, 1911

Portage Community School District serves Portage.

Portage High School was upgraded to a larger building in 1998, with the older high school building now housing the Wayne E. Bartels Middle School. Portage has two elementary schools: John Muir and Woodridge. Two rural elementary schools serve two of the towns in Columbia County: Lewiston and Fort Winnebago. There are also two private schools: St. John's Lutheran and St. Mary's Catholic Schools. Madison Area Technical College also has a campus located in Portage.

The Portage scheme of support for children with special educational needs was developed in the city.

== Infrastructure ==
=== Corrections ===
Wisconsin Department of Corrections operates the Columbia Correctional Institution.

=== Transportation ===
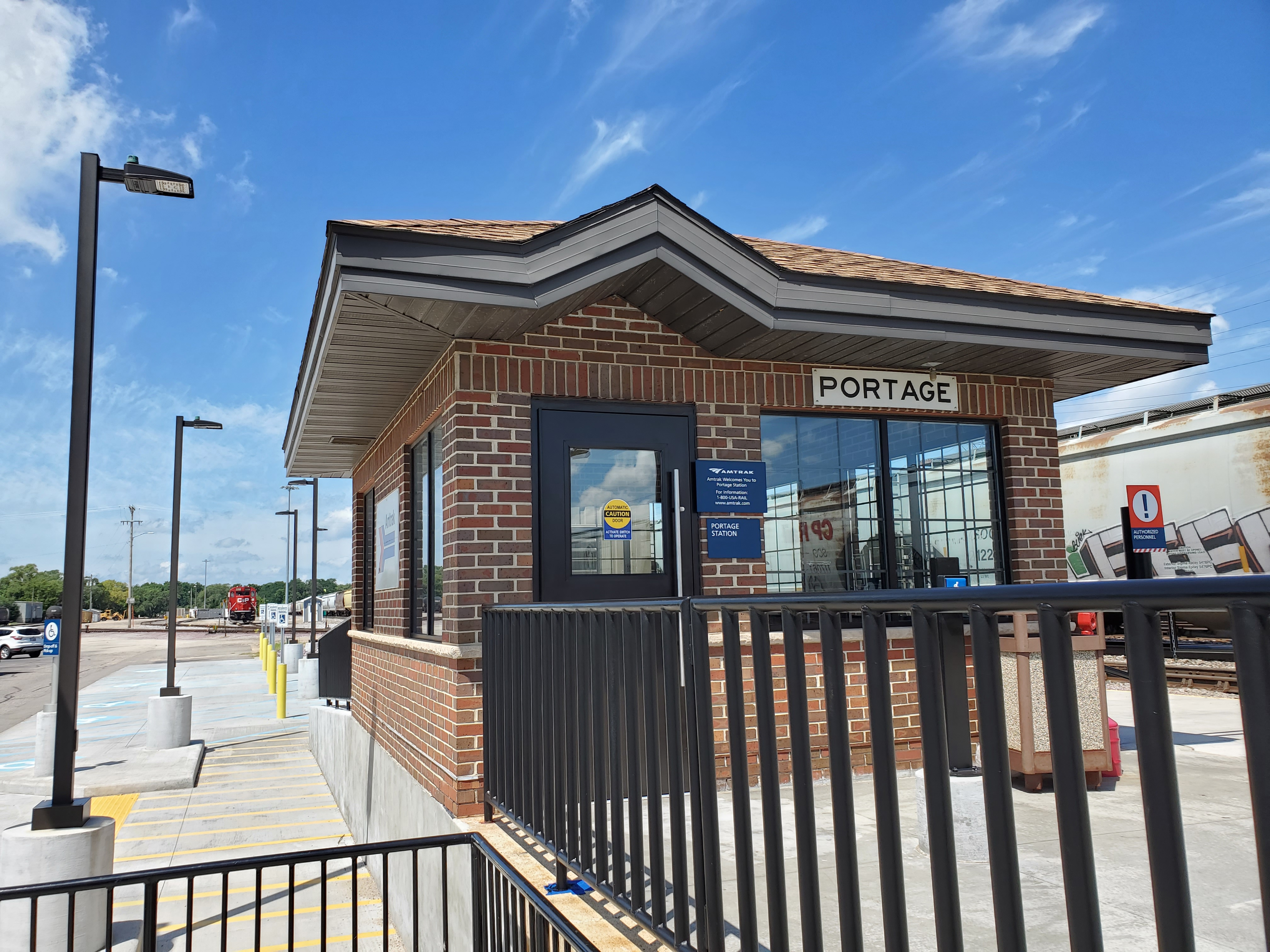
Amtrak station in Portage

Three interstate highways, 39, 90 and 94, run past Portage, giving the city a 30-minute commute to Madison and a 15-minute commute to Wisconsin Dells. The city also lies only a few hours from Milwaukee, Chicago, and Minneapolis/ Saint Paul, Minnesota.

Portage station provides Amtrak service via the Empire Builder between Chicago and Seattle or Portland, and the Borealis between Chicago and St. Paul, for a total of two trains in either direction daily. Freight railroad service is provided by the Canadian Pacific Railway which does business in the American Midwest as the Soo Line Railroad.

Portage is served by intercity bus from Janesville via Madison to Wausau with a bus stopping in each direction daily at the Portage station Portage Municipal Airport (C47) serves the city and surrounding communities.

== Notable people ==
- Earl Abell, member of the College Football Hall of Fame
- Alvin Alden, Wisconsin politician
- Walt Ambrose, NFL player
- Josiah D. Arnold, Wisconsin politician
- Levi W. Barden, Wisconsin politician
- Everett Bidwell, Wisconsin politician
- Peter J. Boylan, U.S. Army general, President of Georgia Military College
- Ben Brancel, Wisconsin politician
- Samuel S. Brannan, Wisconsin politician and newspaper editor
- Llywelyn Breese, Wisconsin politician, former Secretary of State
- Guy W.S. Castle, Medal of Honor recipient
- Maureen Clark, U.S. Olympian
- William W. Corning, Wisconsin politician
- Jeffrey Dahmer, imprisoned at Columbia Correctional Institution in Portage
- Luther S. Dixon, Chief Justice of the Wisconsin Supreme Court
- Thomas E. Fairchild, Judge of the U.S. Court of Appeals
- Russel C. Falconer, Wisconsin politician
- Zona Gale, writer, first woman to win the Pulitzer Prize for drama, 1921
- Charles Randall Gallett, Wisconsin politician
- B. Frank Goodell, Wisconsin politician
- Henry Gunderson, lieutenant governor of Wisconsin
- Joshua James Guppey, Union Army general
- Frank A. Haskell, Union Army colonel, author of a noted account of the Battle of Gettysburg
- Philip Hayes, U.S. Army general
- Charles W. Henney, U.S. Representative
- John Edward Kelley, U.S. Representative from South Dakota
- Herman Lange, Wisconsin politician
- Margery Latimer, writer
- James J. Lindsay, U.S. Army general
- Wellington Porter McFail, aviator
- Hugh McFarlane, Wisconsin politician
- John Muir, naturalist
- William Owen, Wisconsin politician
- Russell W. Peterson, former governor of Delaware
- Russ Rebholz, head coach of the Winnipeg Blue Bombers, member of the Canadian Football Hall of Fame; head coach of the University of Wisconsin-Milwaukee Panthers men's basketball team
- Ferdinand Schulze, Wisconsin politician
- Delphine Anderson Squires, suffragist and journalist
- Mike Thompson, NFL player
- Yellow Thunder, chief of the Ho-Chunk (or Winnebago) tribe
- Andrew Jackson Turner, writer, newspaper editor, politician
- Frederick Jackson Turner, historian, Pulitzer Prize winner
- Samuel K. Vaughan, Union Army general
- Joan Wade, Wisconsin politician
- Jabez H. Wells, Wisconsin politician

== Images ==
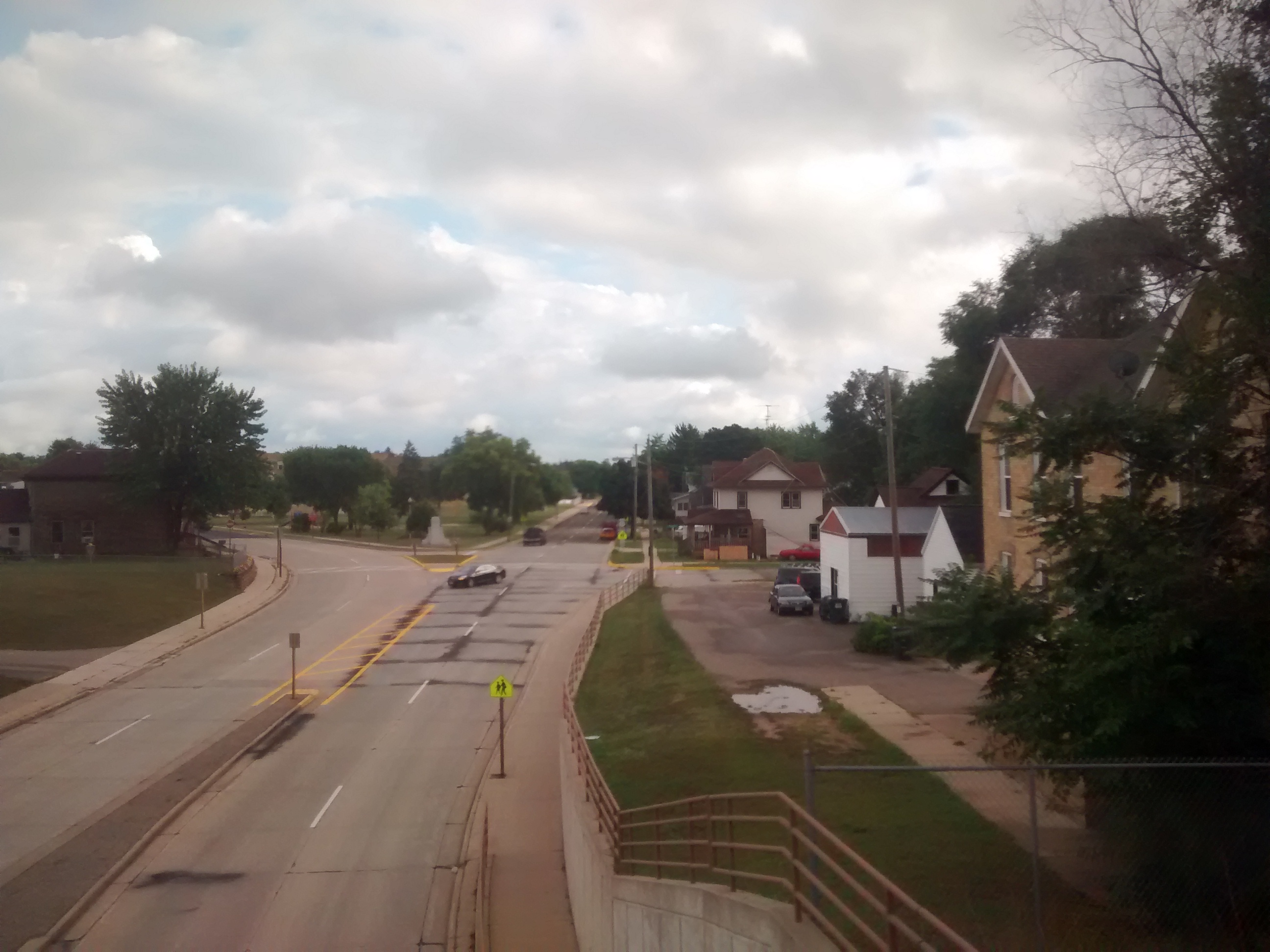
Looking south at DeWitt Street and MacFarlane Lane divide

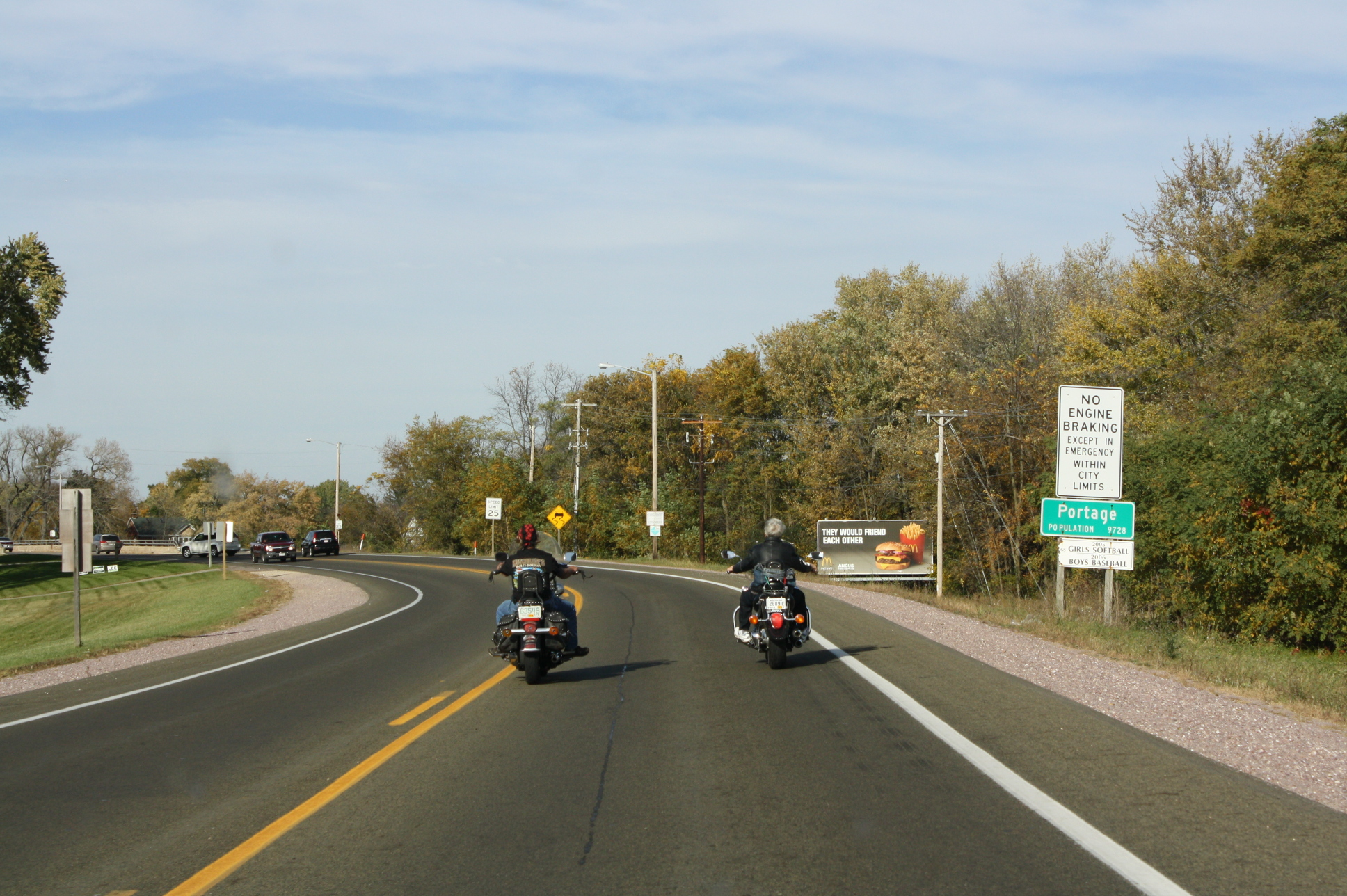
West side city limit sign on Highway 33

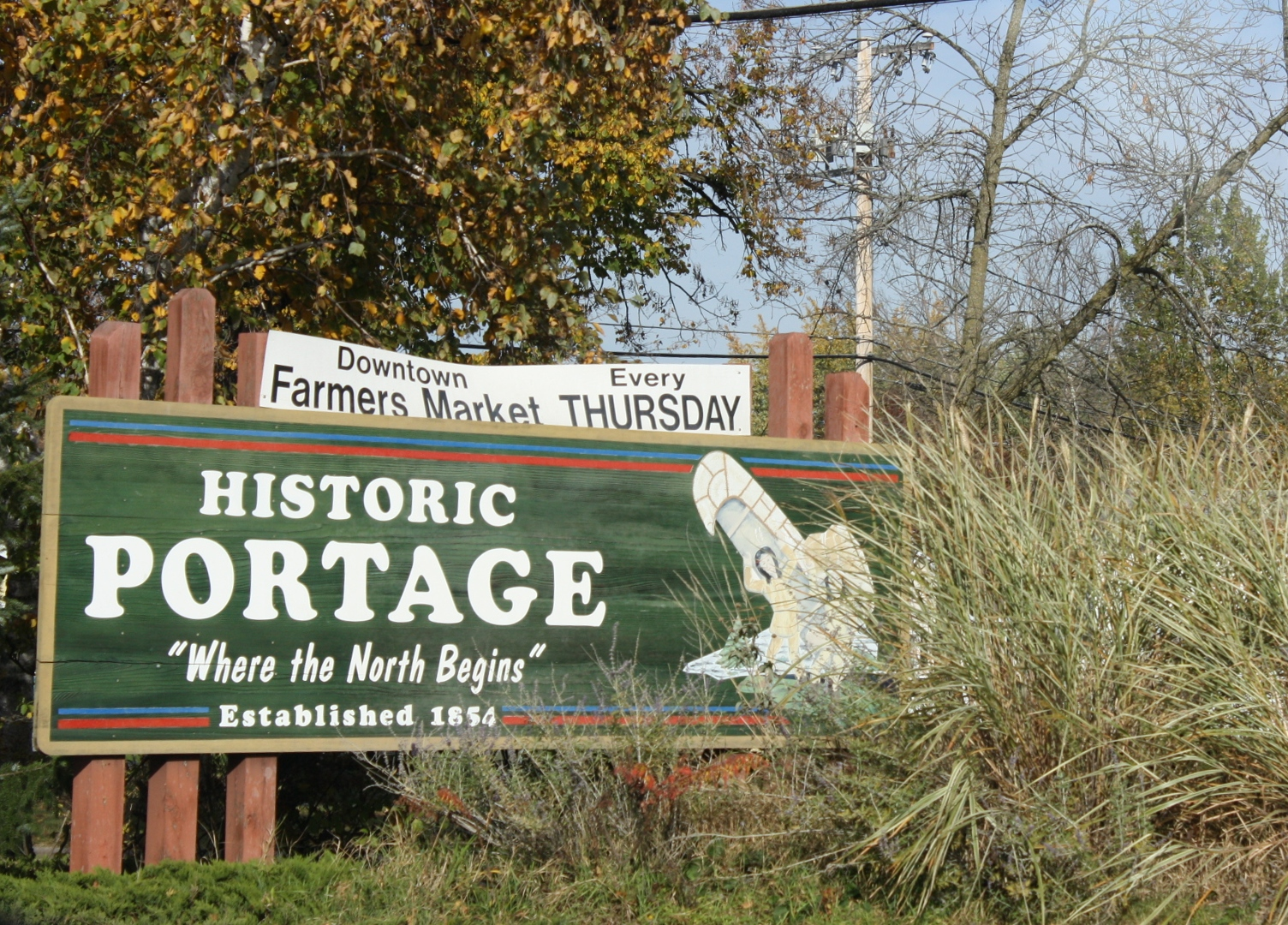
Welcome sign

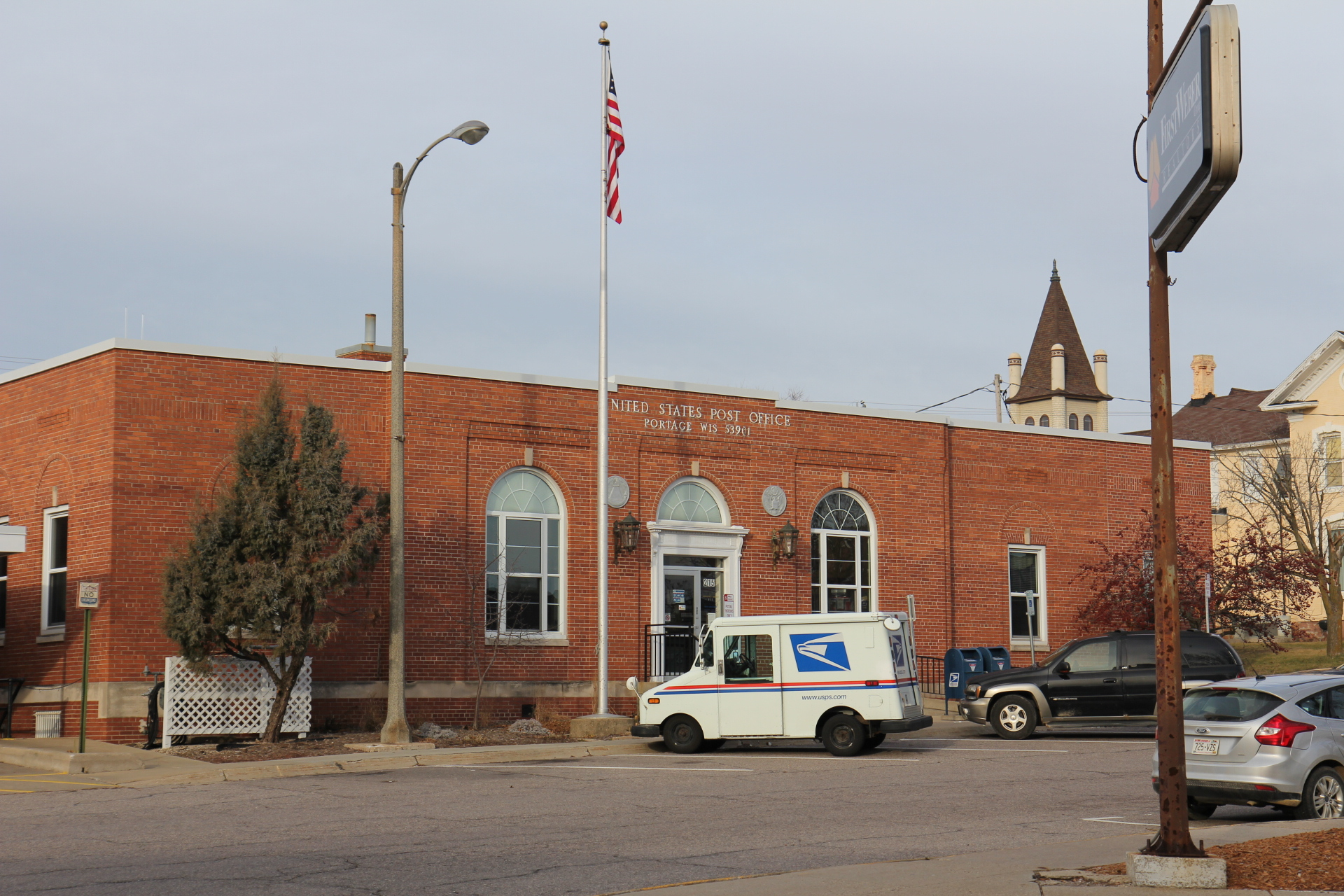
Post office

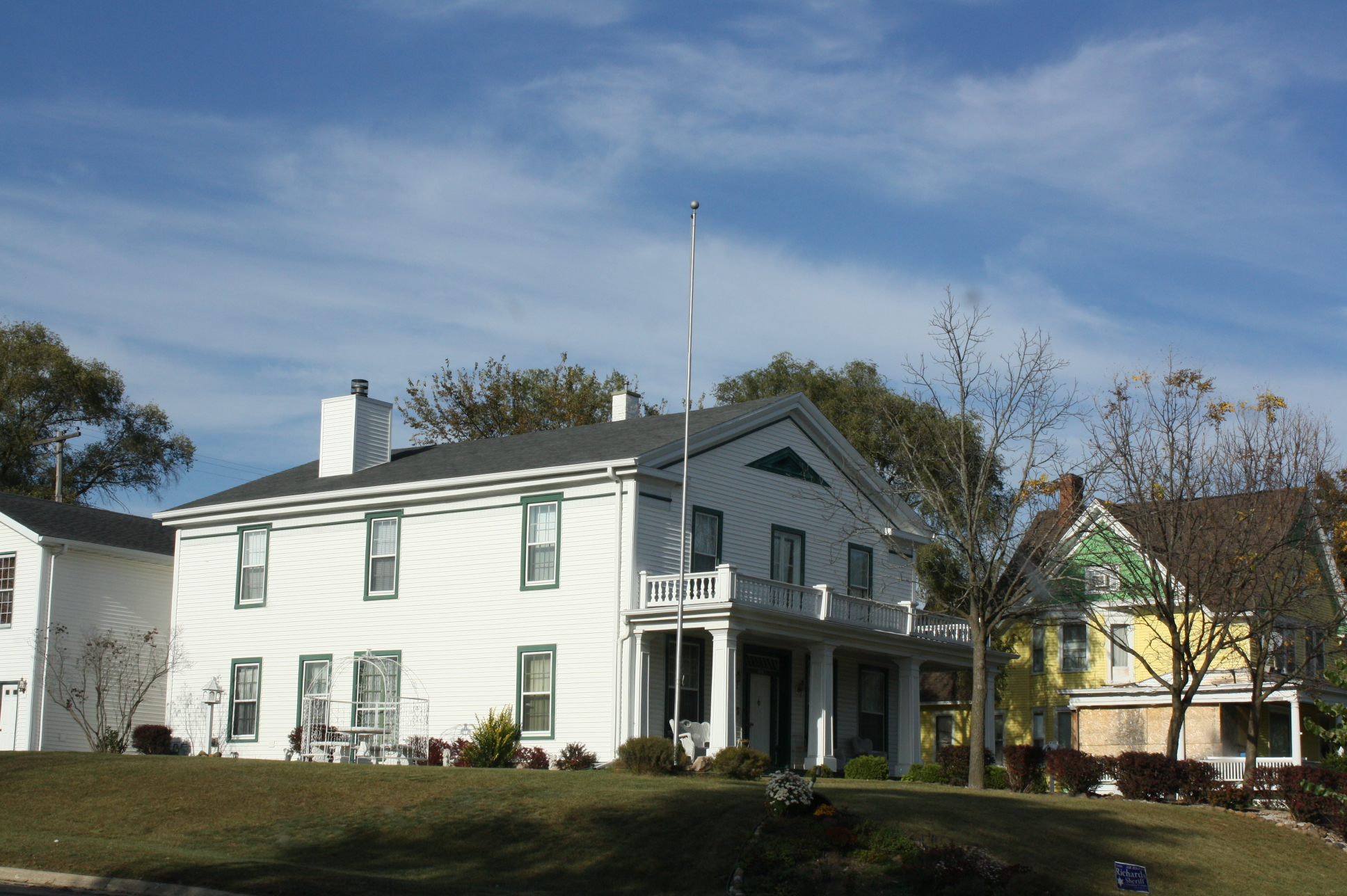
Henry Merrell House

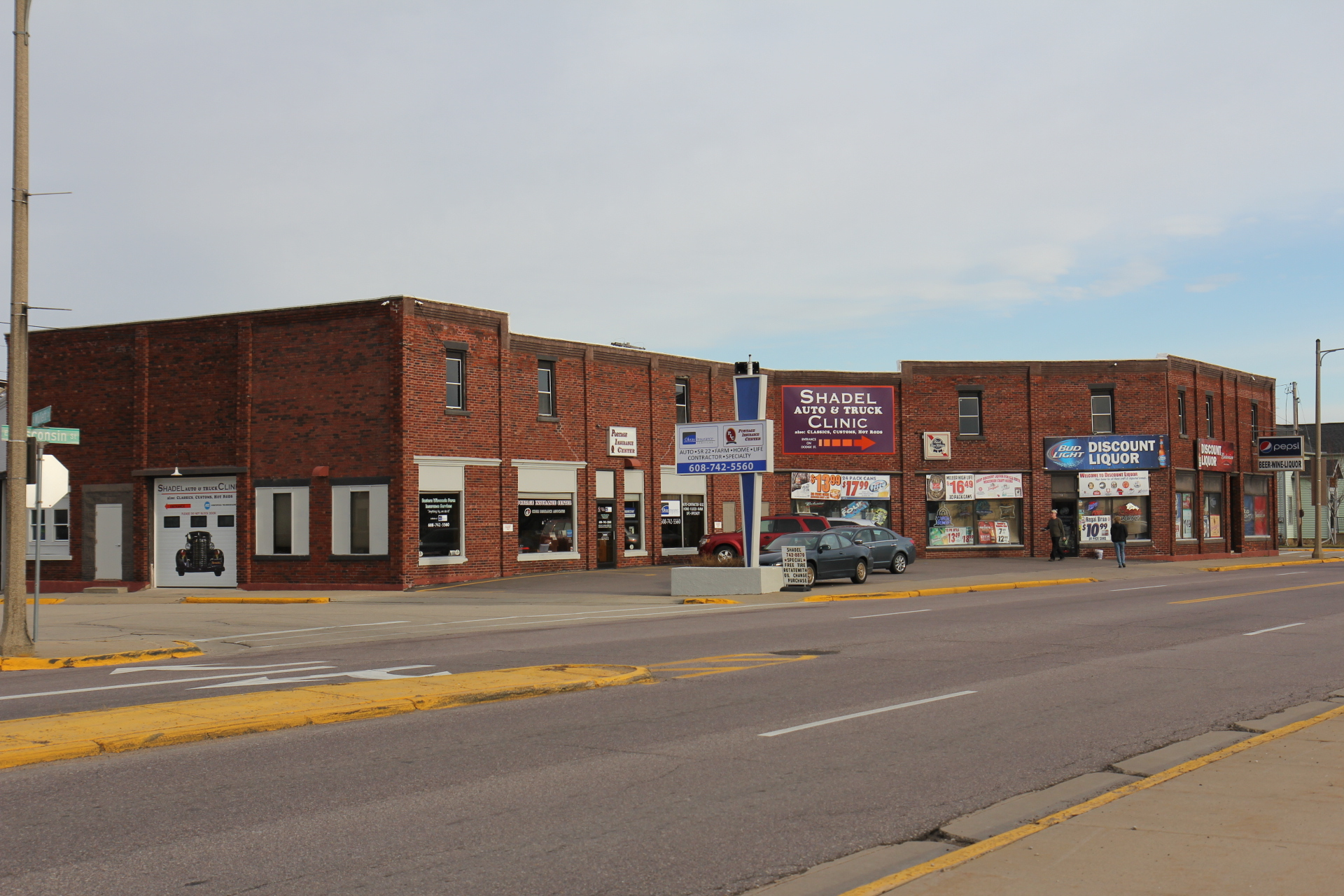
Part of the Portage Industrial Waterfront Historic District

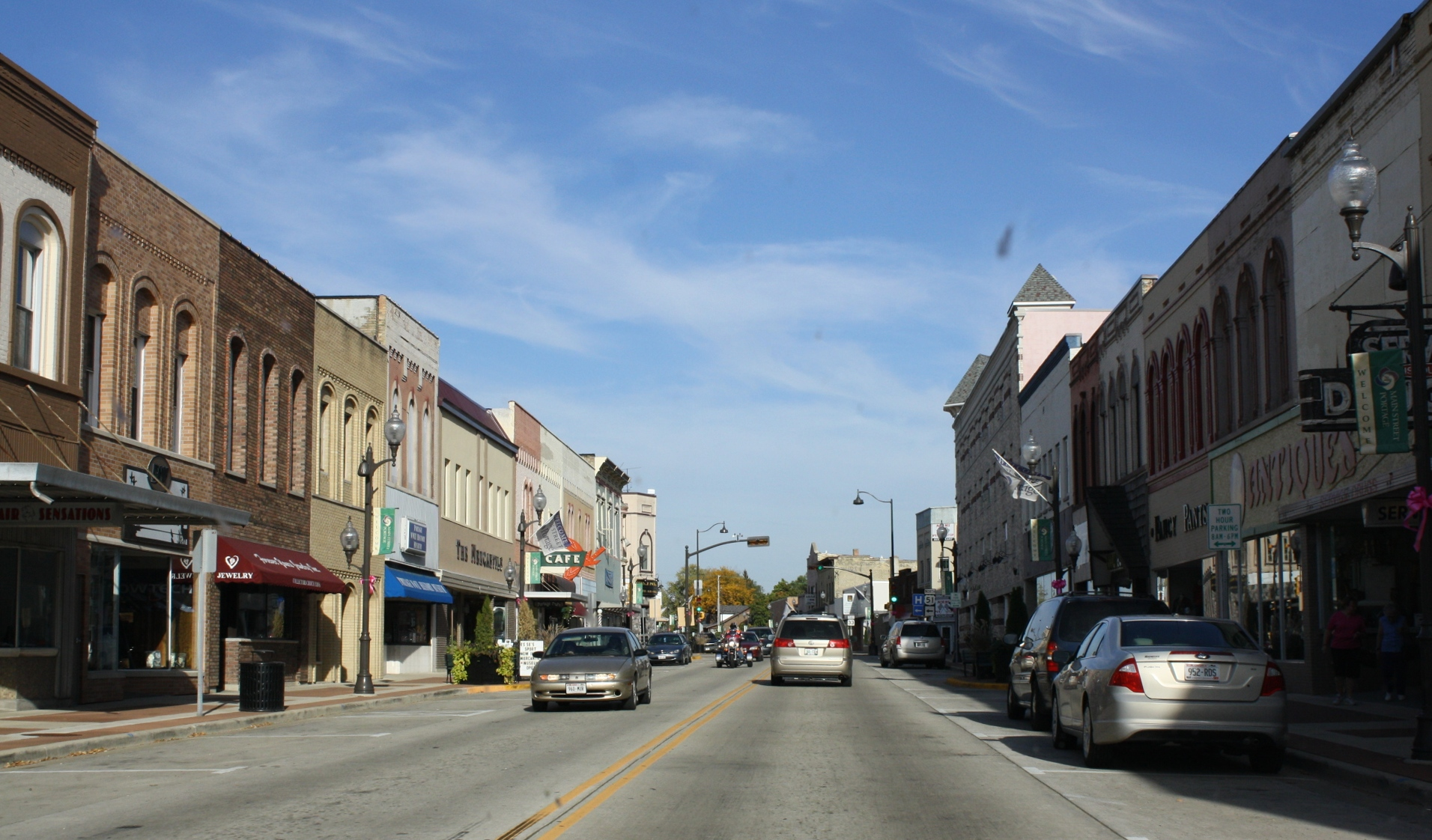
Part of the Portage Retail Historic District

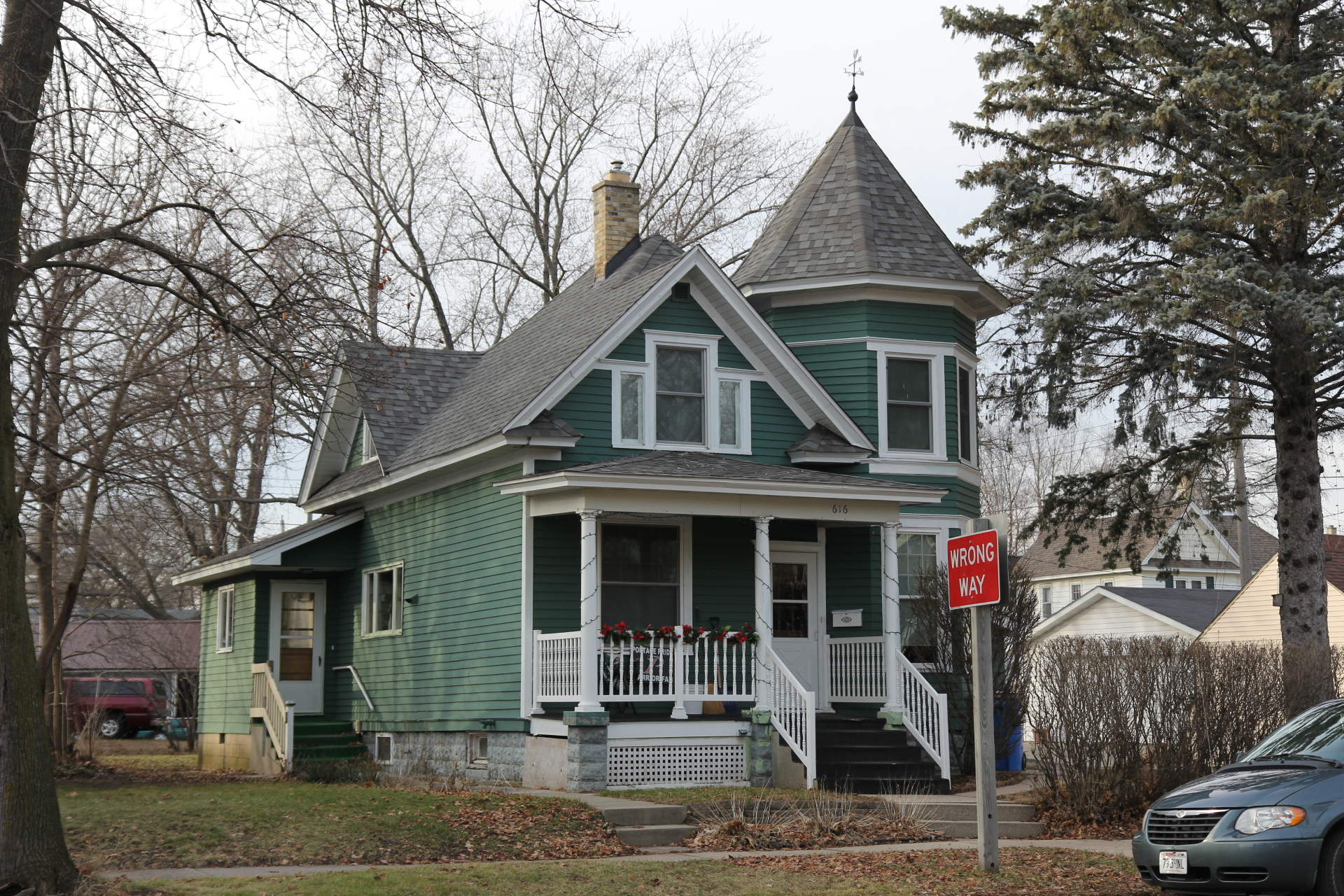
A house in the Society Hill Historic District

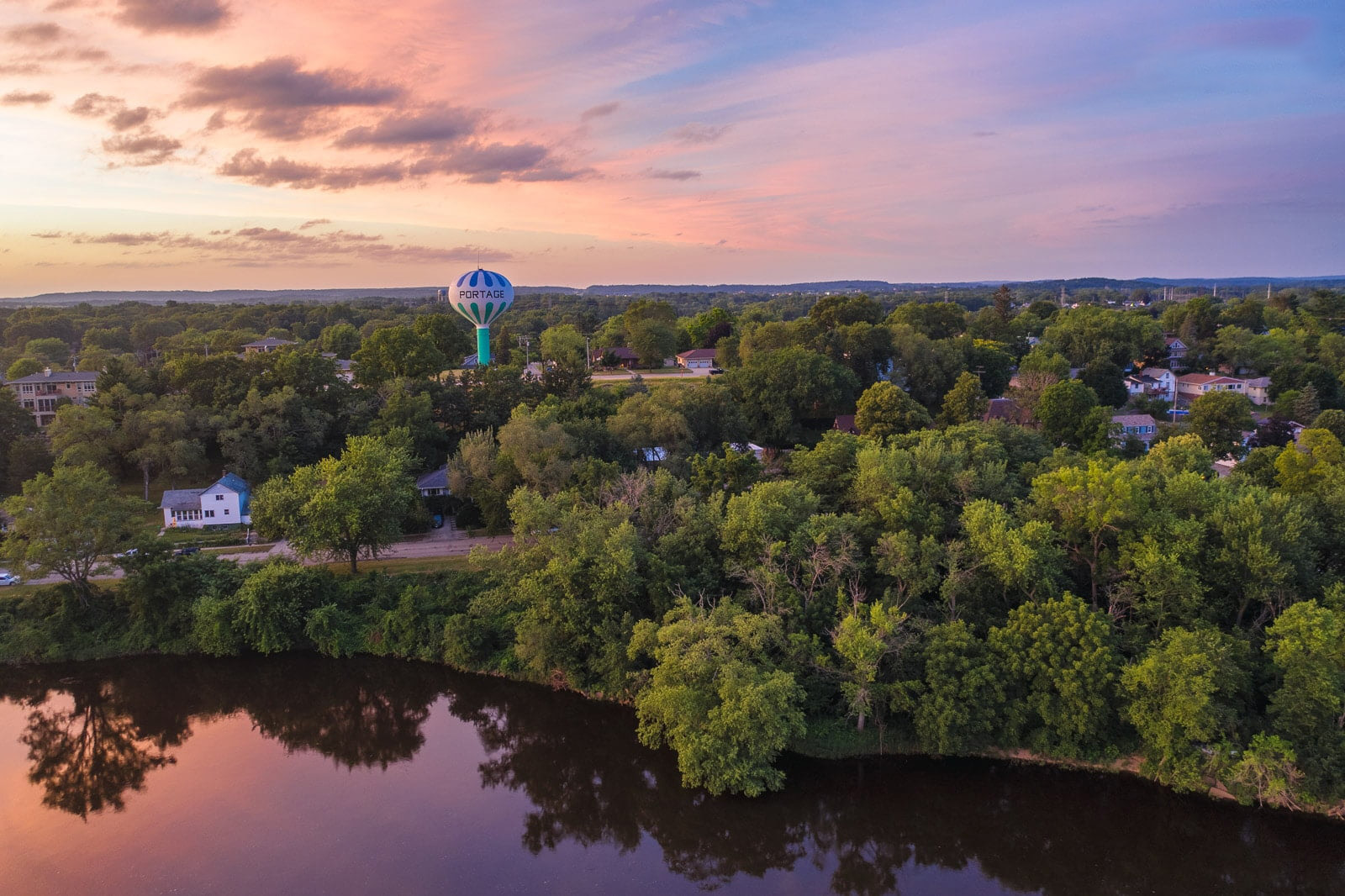
Portage Water Tower Near Pauquette Park
