= Miss Lulu Bett (novel) =

1920 novel by Zona Gale

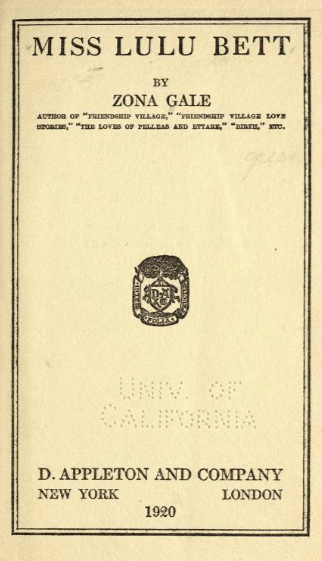
- Title page for Miss Lulu Bett (1920)
- Author: Zona Gale
- Language: English
- Genre: Novel
- Publisher: D. Appleton and Co. New York, London
- Publication date: 1920
- Publication place: United States; United Kingdom
- Media type: Print (hardcover)
- Pages: 264
- OCLC: 284467

Miss Lulu Bett is a 1920 novel by American writer Zona Gale, later adapted for the stage. It was a bestseller at the time of its initial publication, but gradually fell out of favor through changing tastes and social conditions. It was the first play by a woman to win a Pulitzer Prize for Drama,

== Plot summary ==
The story concerns a woman, Lulu, who lives with her sister's family, essentially acting as a servant. She does not complain about her position but is not happy. When her brother-in-law's brother, Ninian, comes to visit, there is a certain attraction between them. While joking around one evening they find themselves accidentally married, due to the laws of the state requiring little more than wedding vows to be recited while a magistrate is in the room for a marriage to count as legal. On learning this, Ninian and Lulu decide they like the idea of being married and choose to remain together. However, within a month, Lulu is back home, having discovered that Ninian was already legally married: 18 years prior he had wed a girl who left him after 2 years, but he had forgotten about it. Lulu considers this a reasonable story, but her brother-in-law, Dwight, insists that it would be a humiliation to the family to reveal such a thing, and insists that she tell everyone instead that Ninian grew bored with her and left her. Lulu is unable to see why this should be a less humiliating story, and begins to complain about her circumstances for the first time. She also notices that her teenage niece, Di, is unhappy, and also seems to be trying to use marriage as a way to escape her circumstance. Lulu eventually has to prevent Di from eloping, and is finally inspired to move out of her sister's home and live independently.

== Adaptations ==
Gale first adapted the novel for a play that opened on Broadway on December 27, 1920, starring Carroll McComas.

Two endings were written for the play, the original as seen in December 1920 (and the ending that won Gale the Pulitzer Prize from Drama; the first woman ever to do so) has Lulu starting a life on her own and undertaking adventures of her own as we hear in her final lines, "Good-by. Good-by, all of you. I'm going I don't know where-to work at I don't know what. But I'm going from choice!"

The revised ending is more typical and would have been a bit more commercially acceptable and far less challenging to the audiences of the day. In this ending, Ninian appears just as Lulu decides to go off on her own life to work and live elsewhere. He asks her forgiveness and she agrees saying "I forgave you in Savannah, Georgia."

In 1921 the work was adapted for a silent film of the same name by Clara Beranger, directed by William C. deMille, starring Lois Wilson, Milton Sills, Theodore Roberts, Helen Ferguson, Mabel Van Buren, Ethel Wales and May Giraci.
