= Portage Canal (Wisconsin) =

- U.S. National Register of Historic Places
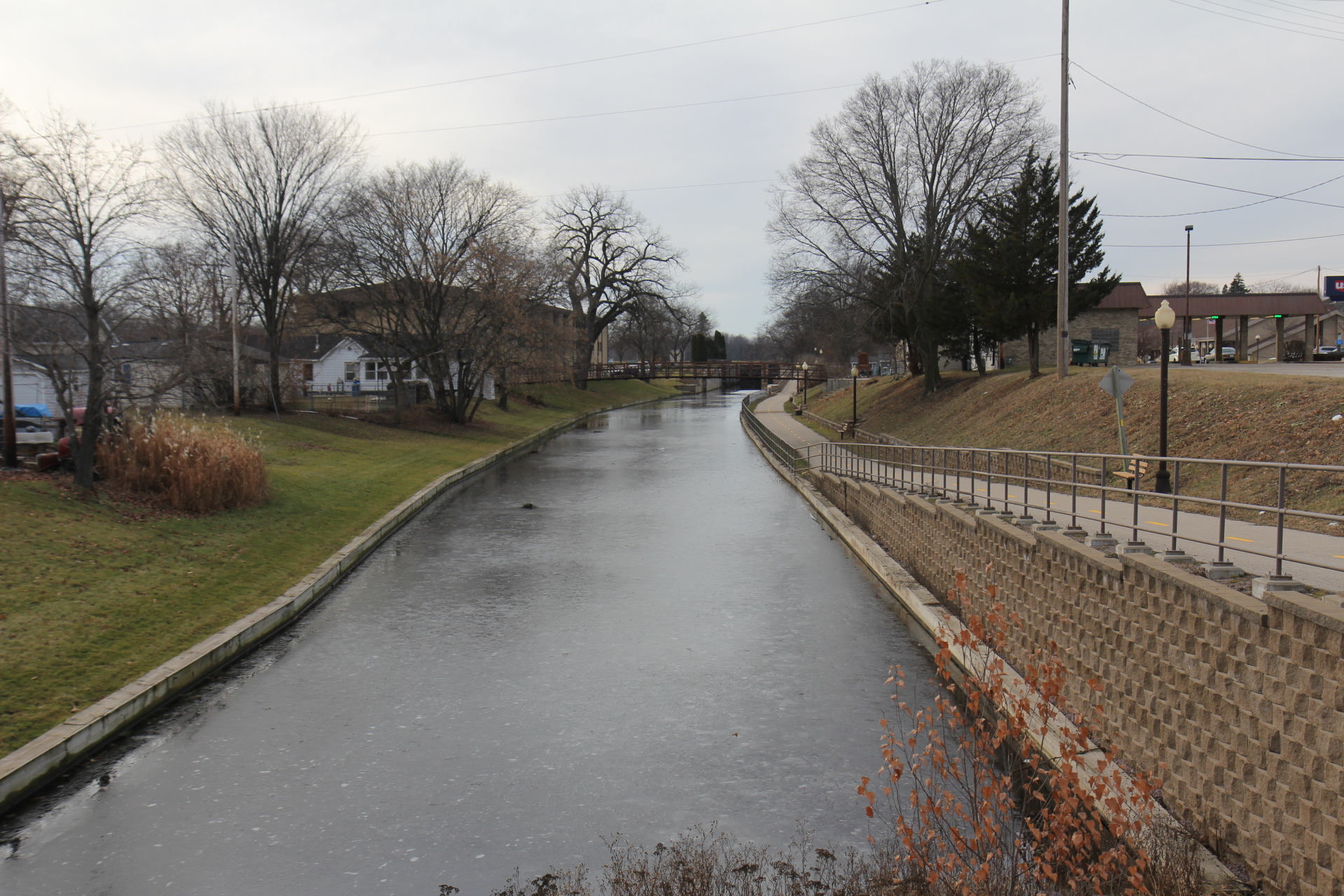
- Portage Canal in downtown Portage

- Location within Wisconsin Location within the United States
- Location: Between the Fox and Wisconsin Rivers, Portage, WI
- Coordinates: 43°32′49″N 89°26′50″W
- Built: 1876
- Architects: Conro, Starke & Co.; U.S.Army Corps of Engineers
- NRHP reference No.: 77000030
- Added to NRHP: August 26, 1977

The Portage Canal is a former navigation canal connecting the Fox River to the Wisconsin River in Portage, Wisconsin, that operated from 1876 to 1951. Located at the highest elevation on the Fox–Wisconsin Waterway, the 2.3-mile (3.7 km) canal enabled boat traffic to cross the St. Lawrence River Divide between the Great Lakes Basin and the Mississippi River Basin. The canal had two locks, one at Portage and one at Fort Winnebago.

As of 2026, most of the Portage Canal remains watered and open to canoeing and kayaking, though the locks remain inoperable and some segments have been infilled. The canal is promoted by the Portage Canal Society and is the focus for the annual Canal Days festival in Portage.

== History ==
The Portage Canal replaced a longstanding portage route between the Fox and Wisconsin Rivers, known in Ho-Chunk as Wawa’ąįja (pronounced "Wau-wau-ainja"), meaning "lift above head". The route's name was historically anglicized as the Wauona Trail or Wauona Portage.

Numerous attempts were made to build the thin Wisconsin-Fox connection through the marshy land, beginning in 1837 with the formation of the Portage Canal Company. Digging and hauling by hand through two and a half miles of muddy terrain, the project was quickly abandoned. A second project, started in 1849, managed to cut a path usable by canoe, but not viable for commerce. The final project, complete with locks to raise the water level of the Fox to that of the Wisconsin's, was not completed until 1876 by the Army Corps of Engineers. Unfortunately, by then, the railroads were quick on their way, followed soon thereafter by the automobile. The Portage Canal acquired a new steel gate and concrete lock in 1926 due to a rupture of the 1876 wooden gate and the quoin post of the west gate of the lock in April 1926. A local contractor, M.E. White Company of Chicago, was awarded the bid in August 1926. The firm completed the repairs of the lock and replaced the 1876 wooden gate under the supervision of the U.S. Army Corps of Engineers in Milwaukee. The 1926 Portage Canal Lock was the first steel and concrete lock on the Fox River. The subcontractor for the steel gate was the Lakeside Bridge and Steel Company of Wisconsin. During the re-construction process, the Engineers were faced with containing underground springs beneath the lock, which caused considerable delays. The White Construction Co. repaired the fallen wall and dismantled the remaining wall of the lock, which were re-laid and constructed according to the original configurations of the 1876 construction. The White Construction Company used 9,000 barrels of Portland cement to build the locks. The canal lock and new gate were completed in May 1928.

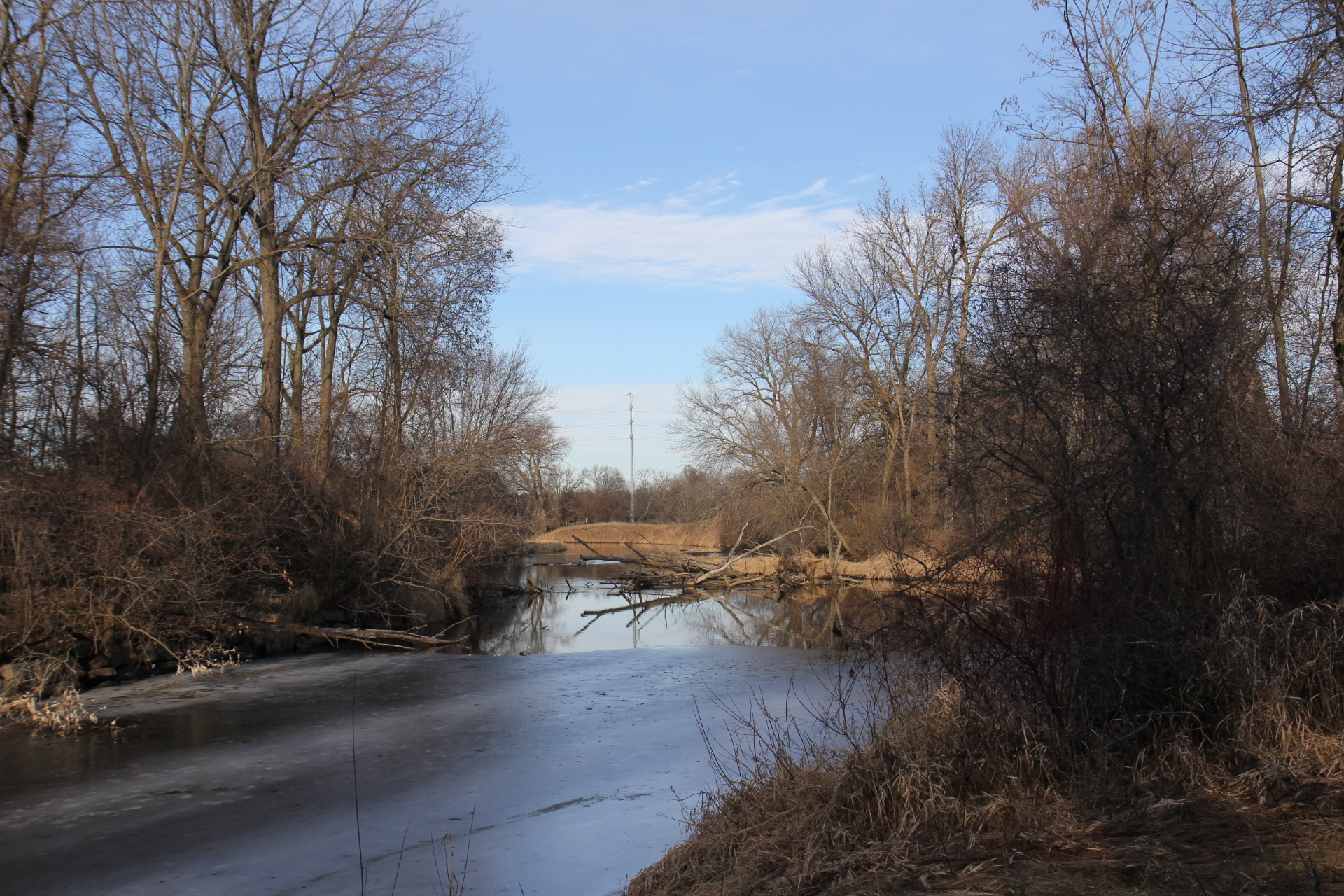
Canal emptying into the Fox River

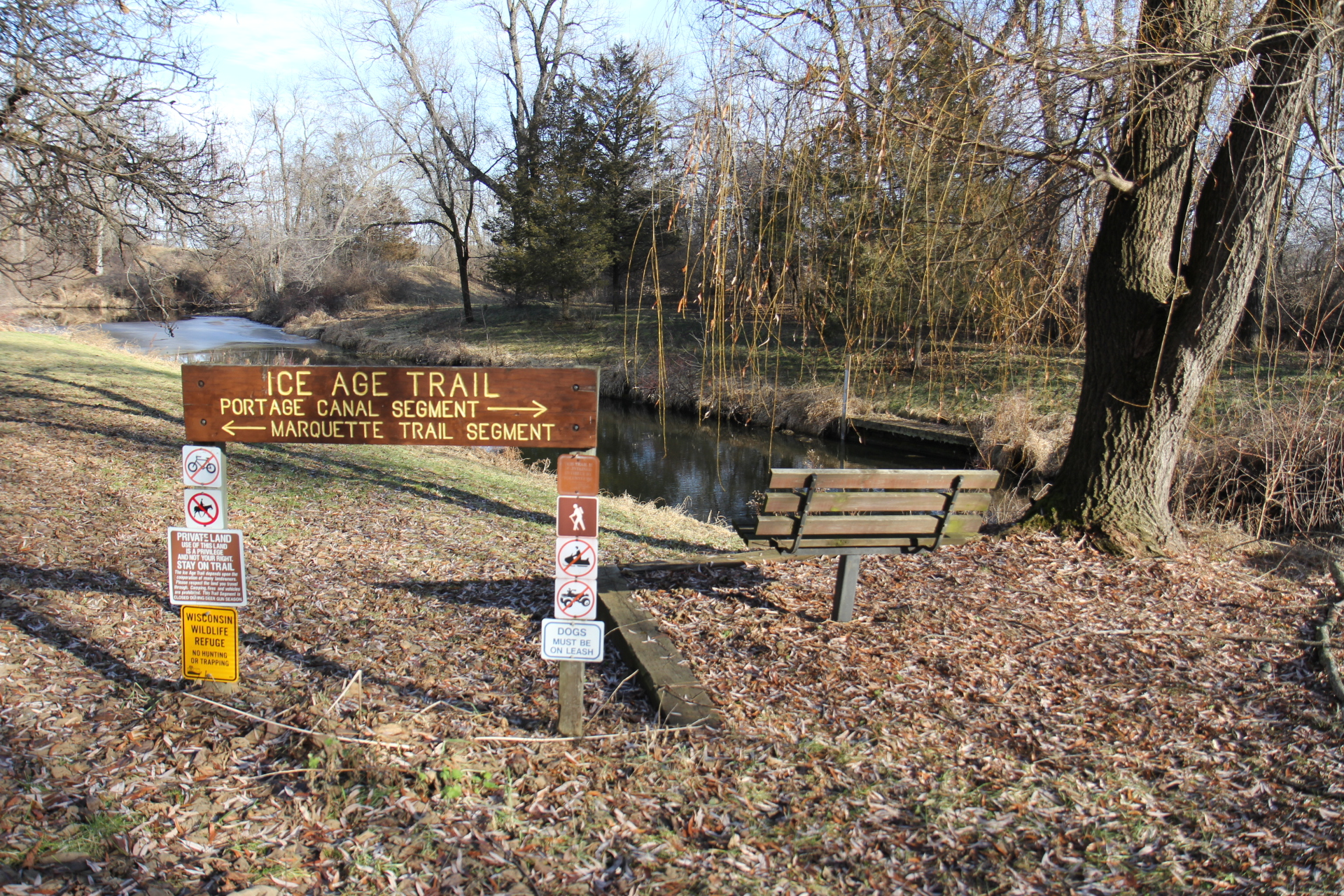
crossing of the Ice Age Trail

The use of the canal as a major means of commerce lasted only a few decades, though pleasure craft, including steamboats, continued to ply the narrow waterway. In following years, the canal began to degrade through lack of upkeep. The canal was used until 1951 when the Fort Winnebago Lock was bulldozed in, and the Wisconsin River Locks were welded shut.

The canal has undergone a significant restoration project to clean up and restore the canal, revitalizing it as a community asset. Beginning in 2020 and continuing into 2021, the DNR, in collaboration with the City of Portage, removed 30,000 cubic yards of contaminated sediment from the canal, addressing the legacy contamination from years of heavy industrial use, primarily heavy metals. Additionally, 1.3 million gallons of contaminated water were treated, seven storm sewers were extended to maintain stormwater management, and 40,000 tons of material were placed to construct the base for the foundation of an Ice Age Trail addition.

Continued efforts are being made to restore the remainder of the canal to its original condition, and the Portage Canal Society is actively working to raise funds and make further improvements to the canal.
