= Zona Gale =

American writer (1874–1938)

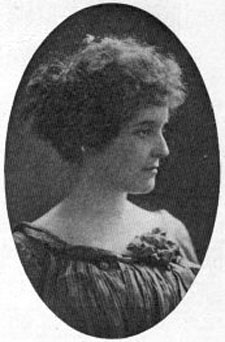
- Born: August 26, 1874; Portage, Wisconsin, U.S.
- Died: December 27, 1938 (aged 64); Chicago, Illinois, U.S.
- Education: University of Wisconsin, Madison (BA, MLS, MA)
- Occupation: Writer
- Spouse: William L. Breese (m. 1928)
- Children: 2
- Writing career
- Genre: Fiction primarily
- Notable work: Miss Lulu Bett
- Notable awards: Pulitzer Prize for Drama (1921)

Zona Gale (August 26, 1874 – December 27, 1938), also known by her married name, Zona Gale Breese, was an American novelist, short story writer, and playwright. She became the first woman to win the Pulitzer Prize for Drama in 1921. The close relationship she had with her parents influenced both her writing and personal life. Her books, based on her hometown, were noted for their charm and intimate realism, capturing the underlying emotions and motivations of her characters. All of her works were published under her maiden name, Zona Gale.

She became a single parent after adopting a girl. Her parents died in 1923 and 1929, after which she became interested in mysticism, leading to a shift in her writing style, much to the dismay of critics who had enjoyed her earlier work. She remained unmarried until her fifties, when she married a childhood friend who was a widower. She supported various political and social causes, including women's rights, pacifism, and education.

== Early life and education ==
Gale was born on August 26, 1874, in Portage, Wisconsin to Charles Franklin and Eliza Beers Gale. She was very close to her parents, who were the inspiration for the "charming elderly couple" in her book The Loves of Pelleas and Etare. She began writing and illustrating stories at the age of 7. Her first story was printed in pencil, because she did not know how to write yet, and the manila pages were bound into a book that was held together by a ribbon.

Gale submitted a short story, "Both", to the Milwaukee Evening Wisconsin when she was sixteen, and was paid $3 for the story. (Note: Gale received notification and the check for $3 at college. She was so excited to have her story accepted by the paper that she traveled 40 miles home, stayed a couple of hours to share her joy with her parents, and made a return trip back to the university.) She attended Wayland Academy in Beaver Dam, Wisconsin before she entered the University of Wisconsin, where she received a Bachelor of Literature or Library Science degree in 1895. She received a master's degree in Library Science in 1899 and another master's degree in 1901. While a student, her poems were published in university publications. She received an honorary doctorate from the University of Wisconsin in 1929.

== Career ==
After college, Gale wrote for Milwaukee Evening Wisconsin. She got the job by showing up at the city editor's desk each day. After two weeks, the city editor asked her to write a story about a flower show. After a total of six weeks, she was given a job on the paper. In 1896, she worked for the Milwaukee Journal. She went to New York City in 1901 and applied to get on every paper in the city. To get a job, she prepared a list of story ideas relevant for that day for the New York World and persisted until she got two assignments, and then a job.

All of this was so largely sheer adventure and pioneering that none of it now seems to me to have been either will or purpose, but sheer delight.

— Zona Gale

Hired as a secretary to Edmund Clarence Stedman, she met people from his literary circle, including Ridgely Torrence, with whom she would have a relationship, and Richard Le Gallienne. She returned to her hometown in 1903 and saw it in a new light that changed her direction as a writer. She found that her "old world was full of new possibilities." She returned to Portage permanently in 1904, where she wrote her stories full-time.

She published Romance Island, her first novel, in 1906, and began the popular "Friendship Village" series of stories which were thought to be based upon Portage, although Gale stated that Friendship Village was not based upon any one town, but typical of a small town. She won first prize, worth $2,000, in 1910 for "The Ancient Dawn" in the short fiction contest by the Delineator. In 1920, she published the novel Miss Lulu Bett, which depicts life in the Midwestern United States, after spending time at Bonnie Oaks. Her novel, appreciated for its realism, was compared to the works of Sinclair Lewis and Theodore Dreiser. She adapted it as a play, which was awarded the Pulitzer Prize for Drama in 1921. For the time, she had a rare skill in the way she wrote about common daily experiences of ordinary people in a small town. Her early works were considered sentimental, but also, like Jane Austen's work, in touch with the deeper meanings of her character's expressions during tea-table banter. Frederick Tabor Cooper said, "We bask for a few hours in that human exhilarating sunshine that radiates straight from the heart of people who are real and true and big of soul." Over time, Gale's work evolved from saccharine stories of village life to tales of small-town monotony and routine.

Preface to a Life, published in 1926 was based on a new-found mysticism that grew after the death of her mother in 1923 and her father in 1929. The main character mistakes his inner wisdom and mysticism for madness. She published essays based upon mysticism. In these works, people's problems could be solved through a kind of transcendentalist enlightenment. Critics, who did not enjoy her book and essays, viewed her work unfavorably from that point forward, even when she tried to return to realism.

She wrote a book about a friend, Frank Augustus Miller, the founder of the Mission Inn Hotel, after his death in 1935. The biography, titled Frank Miller of Mission Inn, was published in 1938. Throughout her career, she wrote under her maiden name, Zona Gale.

== Political and suffrage efforts ==
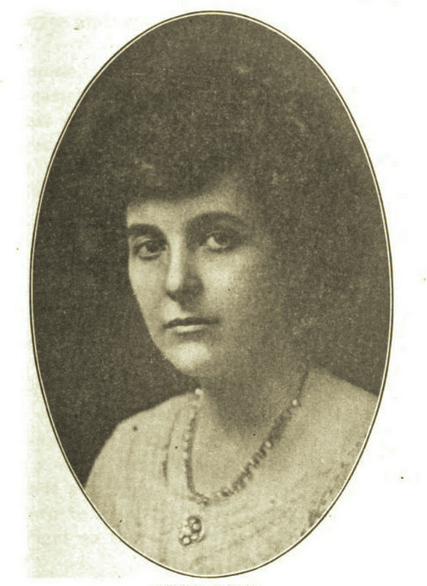
(1918)

She was a suffragist, an activist, and a liberal Democrat, who supported the La Follettes, including Robert Sr. and his two sons Robert Jr. and Philip. She spoke for them at events and on the radio when they were campaigning for office.

She was an active member of the National Woman's Party, and she lobbied extensively for the 1921 Wisconsin Equal Rights Law. In the same year, she attended the founding meeting (in New York) of the Lucy Stone League and became a member of its executive committee. Her activism on behalf of women was her way to help solve "a problem she returned to repeatedly in her novels: women's frustration at their lack of opportunities."

She became a pacifist during World War I. She was a director of the Women's International League for Peace and Freedom. She also criticized the inclusion of military training in college curriculums. She was on the executive committee of the American Union Against Militarism and a member of the Fellowship of Reconciliation and the Women's Peace Society.

Zona Gale did not belong to a war torn world. Her influence for peace and good will lives on. That in no way will affect our love for her or her love for humanity.

— Ada James, social work leader, December 28, 1938 (Note: Just below this tribute was an article, "'Big Four' to Meet Again?" that said that the Big Four Leaders of Europe would meet in 1939 to "iron out all differences including the French and Italian conflict in the Mediterranean". (The meeting was held just before the start of World War II (1939–1945)).)

She was against racial prejudice and promoted improved means of communication among races. She served on the Wisconsin Free Library Commission. In 1922, she established Zona Gale scholarships to pay towards talented young adult's education.

== University of Wisconsin ==
She later became a regent of the university and became embroiled in the ouster of the president, Dr. Glenn Frank. Governor Philip La Follette convinced other regents, some of whom he had appointed, to call for the removal of Frank. Gale stood by Frank and criticized the governor.

== Personal life ==
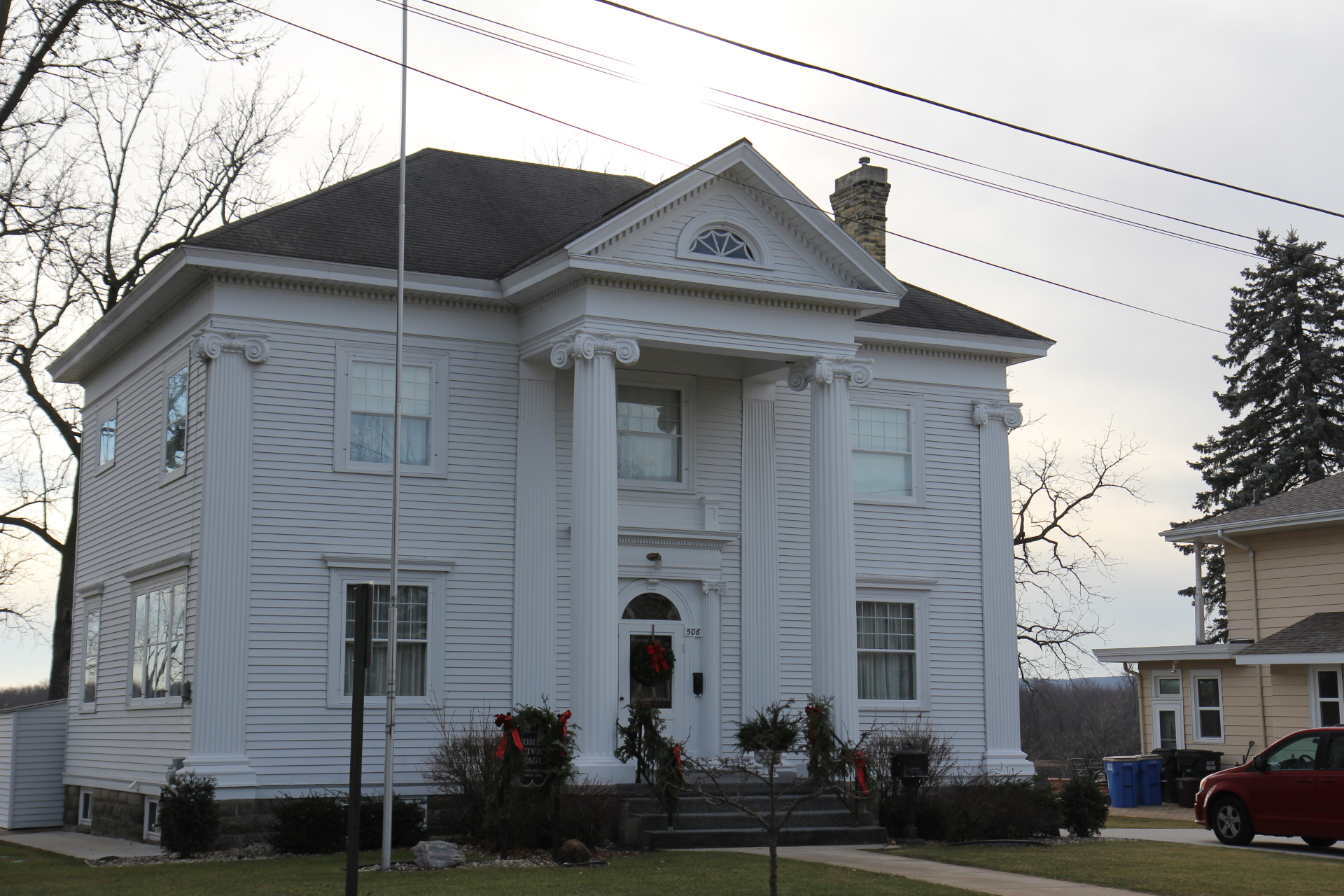
Zona Gale House, which she built for her parents in Portage, is listed on the National Register of Historic Places.

In 1902, she met Ridgely Torrence in New York, with whom she developed a "deeply felt spiritual love", but when considering whether to stay in New York or return to Portage, she returned to her family. Construction began on a house for her and her parents in 1906. Located along the shore of the Wisconsin River in Portage, she lived in the house most of her adult life.

External images
- Leslyn at the Breese home in Portage, 1930
- William, Zona, and Juliette on her wedding day, 1930
- Zona Gale historical marker, Portage

Her mother died in 1923. In 1926, she began caring for a girl, Leslyn, who was a relative. She formally adopted her in 1931. (Note: She is said to have had two daughters, but she adopted Leslyn, who was born about 1926 and became a stepmother to Juliette Breese when she married William Breese.) On June 12, 1928, at the age of 54, she married William L. Breese, who was a platonic friend from her childhood and a widower. (Note: Breese was married to Jessie Blackman, with whom they adopted a girl, Juliette. Jessie died in 1917.) He was a wealthy banker and hosiery manufacturer. They lived in a house on MacFarlane Road in Portage after their marriage. She became a step mother to William's daughter, Juliette Blackman Breese, who married Cecil Bennett in 1930. Her father died in 1929. She became interested in philosophy after the death of her parents.

She enjoyed travel to California, New York, Japan and other places. Gale, a frequent visitor to the Mission Inn Hotel in Riverside, California, became a friend of Frank Augustus Miller, the founder of the hotel.

== Death and legacy ==
Gale came to Chicago in mid-December 1938 for treatment of an ailment and contracted pneumonia about December 20. She died of pneumonia in Passavant Hospital in Chicago on December 27. Dr. Glenn Frank, former president of the University of Wisconsin, presided over her funeral. She was buried at Silver Lake Cemetery in Portage. Most of her estate of $60,000 (equivalent to $1,058,900 in 2024) went to Leslyn, age 12, and Juliette. Leslyn was to receive Gale's personal effects and the Zona Gale house upon her marriage. Juliette was bequeathed another house. Some money was set aside for the Zona Gale scholarships. William Breese died on October 1, 1954, at the age of 90. By the time of Breese's death, Leslyn married Robert Keie of Saginaw, Michigan. (Note: The surname is incorrectly spelled Kale in one source.)

In her memory, William Breese established the Zona Gale Breese Library in Portage. He donated two houses, one of which was the Zona Gale house that went to the Women's Civic League. The performing arts center in Portage was named after her. A historic marker at Commerce Plaza Park in Portage memorializes her life.

== Bibliography ==
=== Novels ===
- Romance Island (1906)
- Mothers to Men (1911)
- Christmas: A Story (1912)
- Heart's Kindred (1915)
- A Daughter of the Morning (1917)
- Birth (1918)
- Miss Lulu Bett (1920)
- Faint Perfume (1923)
- Preface to a Life (1926)
- Borgia (1929)
- Papa La Fleur (1933)
- Light Woman (1937)
- Magna (1939)

=== Short story collections ===
- The Loves of Pelleas and Etarre (1907)
- Friendship Village (1908)
- Friendship Village Love Stories (1909)
- When I Was a Little Girl (1913)
- Neighborhood Stories (1914)
- Peace in Friendship Village (1919)
- Yellow Gentians and Blue (1927)
- Bridal Pond (1930)
- Old-Fashioned Tales (1933)

=== Plays ===
- The Neighbors (1914) (in Wisconsin Plays, edited by T.H. Dickinson)
- Miss Lulu Bett (1920) (dramatization of her novel)
- Uncle Jimmy (1922)
- Mr. Pitt (1925)
- The Clouds (1932)
- Evening Clothes (1932)
- Faint Perfume (1934) (dramatization of her novel)

=== Essays and non-fiction ===
- Civic Improvement in the Little Towns (1913) (pamphlet)
- What Women Won in Wisconsin (1922) (pamphlet)
- "The Novel of Tomorrow" (1922) (in The Novel of Tomorrow and the Scope of Fiction by Twelve American Novelists)
- Portage, Wisconsin and Other Essays (1928)
- Frank Miller of the Mission Inn (biography) (1938)

=== Poetry ===
- The Secret Way (1921)
