= Lodi Street-Prairie Street Historic District =

Historic district in Wisconsin, United States

- U.S. National Register of Historic Places
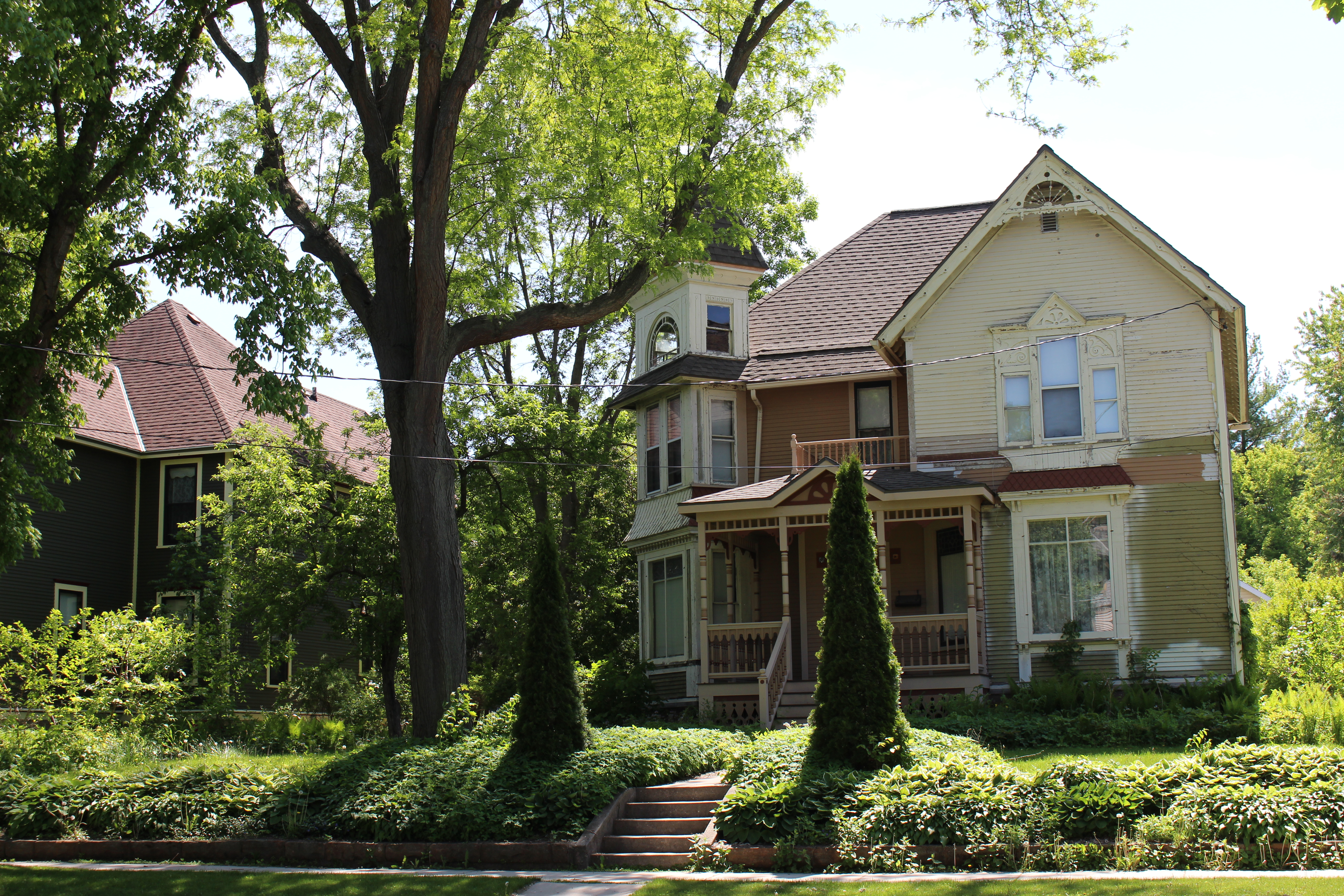
- A portion of the district.
- Location: Roughly Prairie St. from 2nd St. to Mill St. Lodi, Wisconsin
- NRHP reference No.: 00000735
- Added to NRHP: June 22, 2000

The Lodi Street-Prairie Street Historic District is located in Lodi, Wisconsin.

== Description ==
The district is made up of a residential neighborhood including the 1855 Italianate McCloud house, the 1874 Greek Revival Hinds house, the commercial vernacular Clements House hotel, the 1897 Queen Anne Seville house, the 1897 Queen Anne William G. Bissel House, and the 1915 Posta bungalow. It was added to the State and the National Register of Historic Places in 2000.

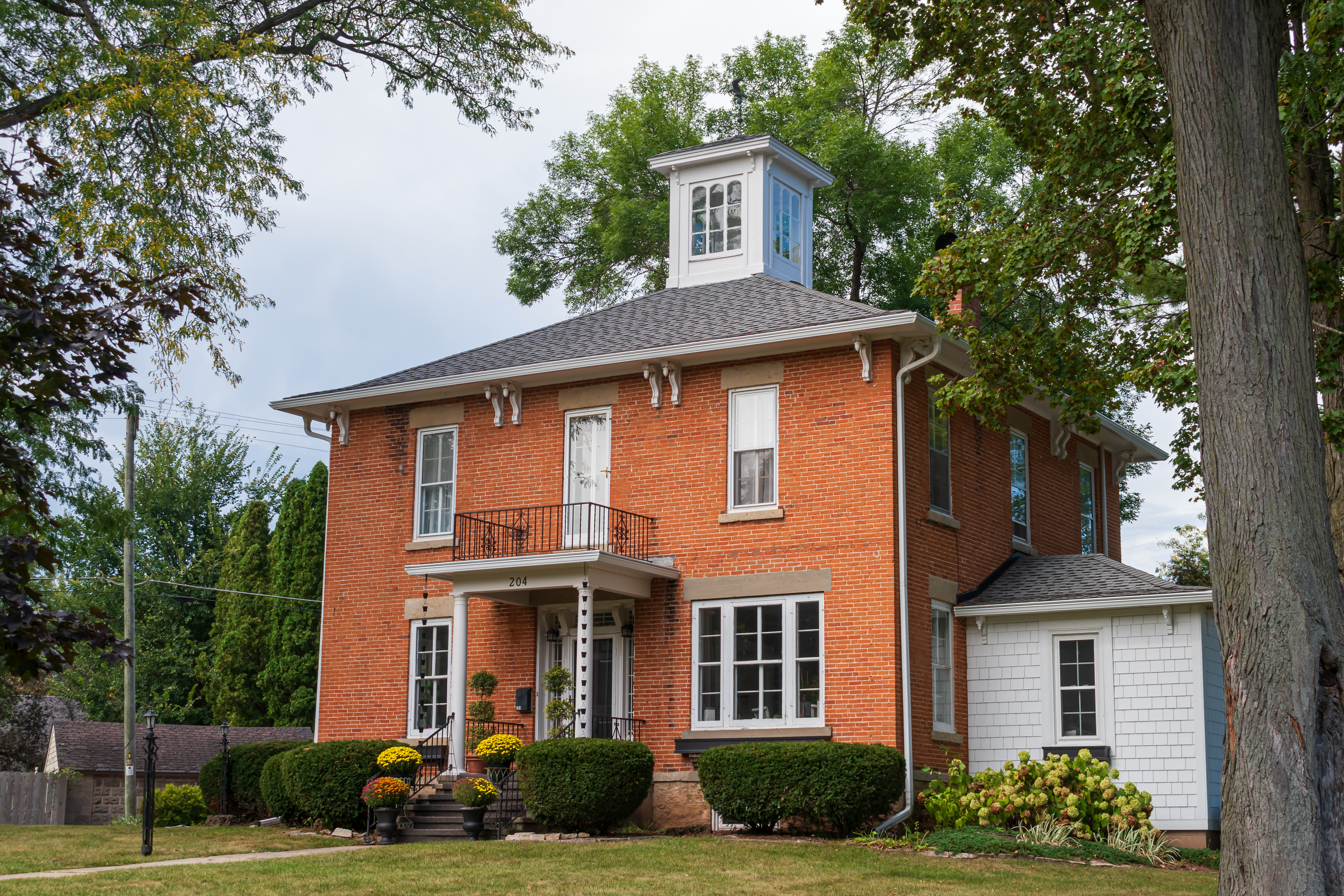
James McCloud House

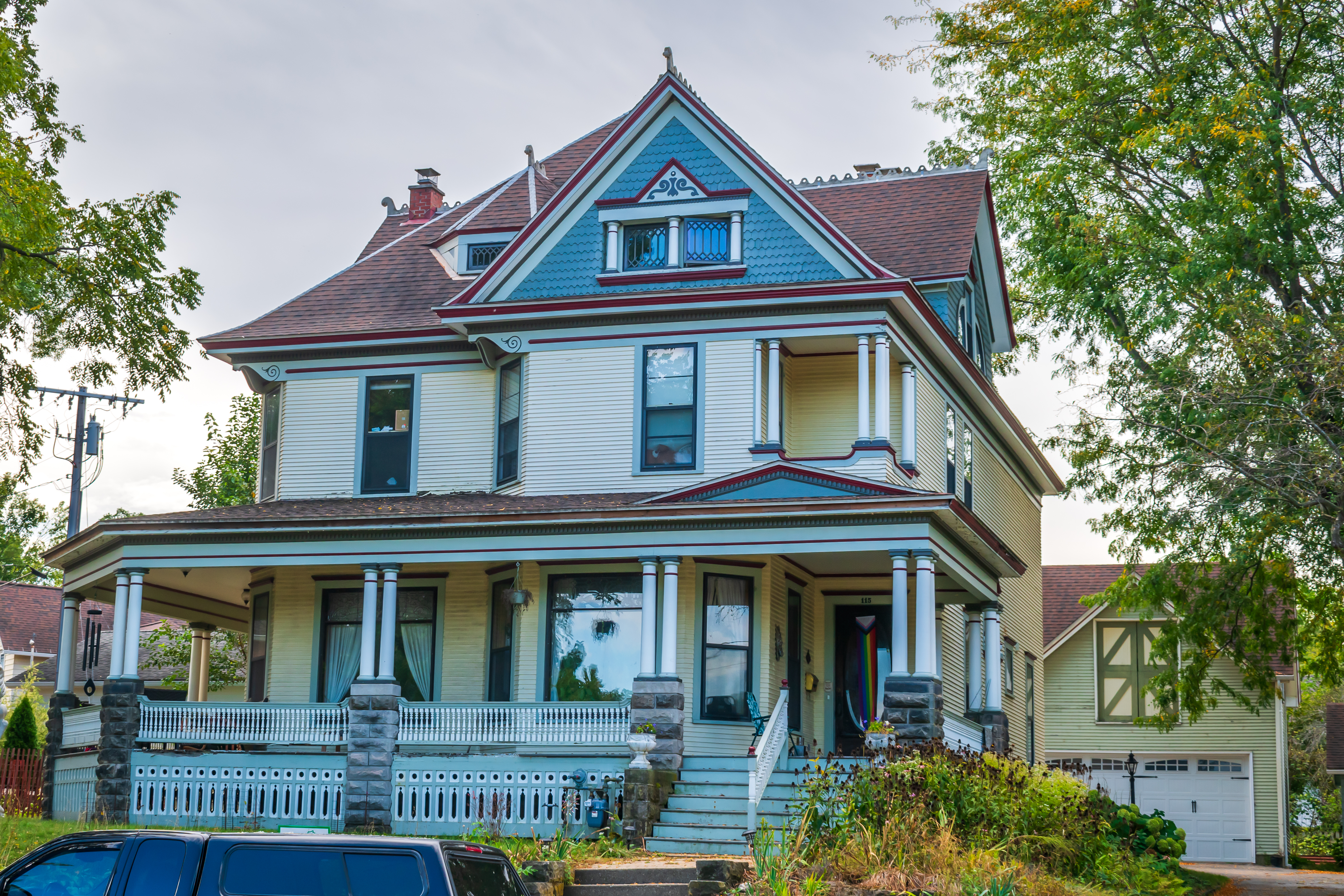
William G. Bissel House

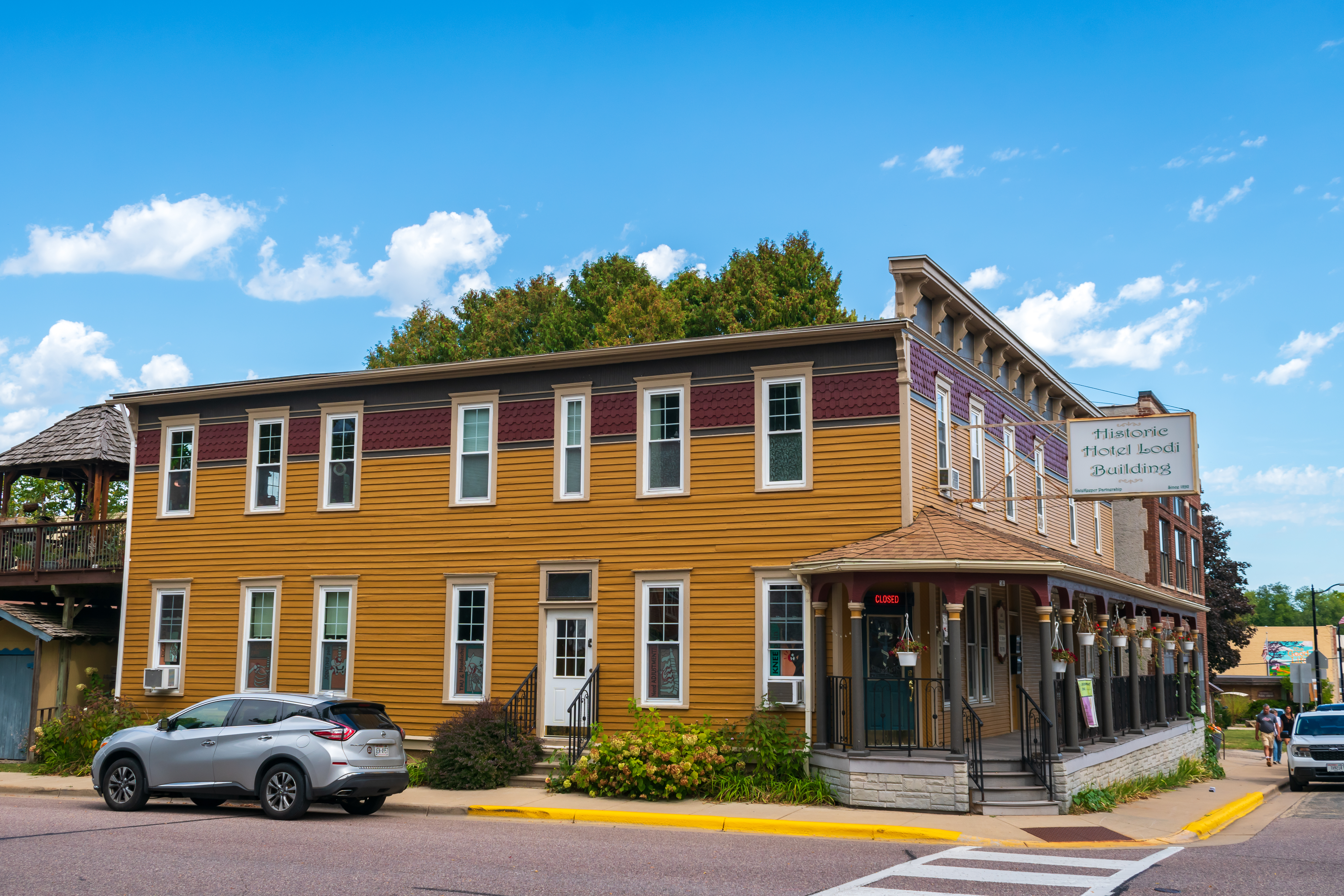
Clements House Hotel
