= Frank T. and Polly Lewis House =

Historic house in Wisconsin, United States

- U.S. National Register of Historic Places
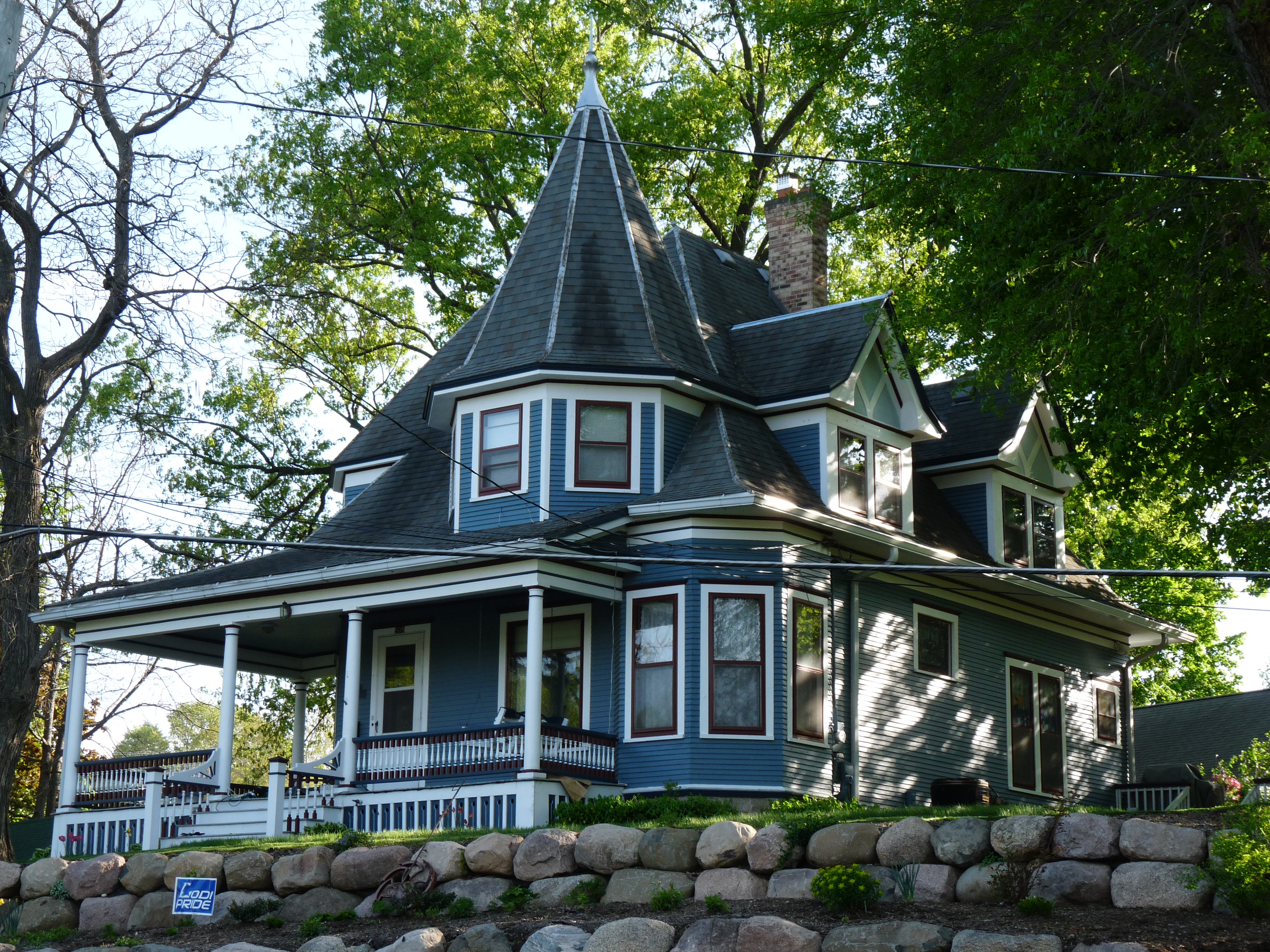
- Lewis house in 2015

- Location within Wisconsin Location within the United States
- Location: 509 N. Main St. Lodi, Wisconsin
- Coordinates: 43°19′10″N 89°31′47″W
- Built: 1901-02
- Architect: Carl C. Menes
- Architectural style: Queen Anne
- NRHP reference No.: 08001329
- Added to NRHP: January 14, 2009

The Frank T. and Polly Lewis House is a historic house at 509 N. Main Street in Lodi, Wisconsin, United States. The house was built in 1901-02 for house painter Frank T. Lewis and his wife, local milliner Polly Sparks Lewis. Prominent local architect Carl C. Menes designed the one-and-a-half story Queen Anne house. The house's design includes a polygonal tower with a steep pointed roof, a wraparound front porch supported by Tuscan columns, flared eaves with frieze boards, and a complex roof with several dormers. The Lewises lived in the house until Polly's death in 1907; Raymond J. Hillier lived in the house from 1918 until 1980.

The house was added to the National Register of Historic Places on January 14, 2009. It is located within the Portage Street Historic District.
