= William F. Groves =

American politician and farmer

William F. Groves (September 23, 1893 – July 30, 1963) was an American politician and farmer.

Born on a farm near Lodi, Wisconsin, Groves graduated from Lodi High School, went to University of Wisconsin and was a dairy farmer. He was president of the Pure Milk Products Cooperative (PMPC) and the Wisconsin Dairy Federation. Groves also served on the Lodi School Board and was the treasurer. In 1935 and 1936, Groves served in the Wisconsin State Assembly as a Progressive. From 1959 to 1961, Groves lived in Madison, Wisconsin, where he was the farm director for WISC-TV. Groves was also a columnist for the Wisconsin Agriculturist and Dairyland News. He died unexpectedly at his home in Lodi, Wisconsin.
