= William S. Dwinnell =

American politician

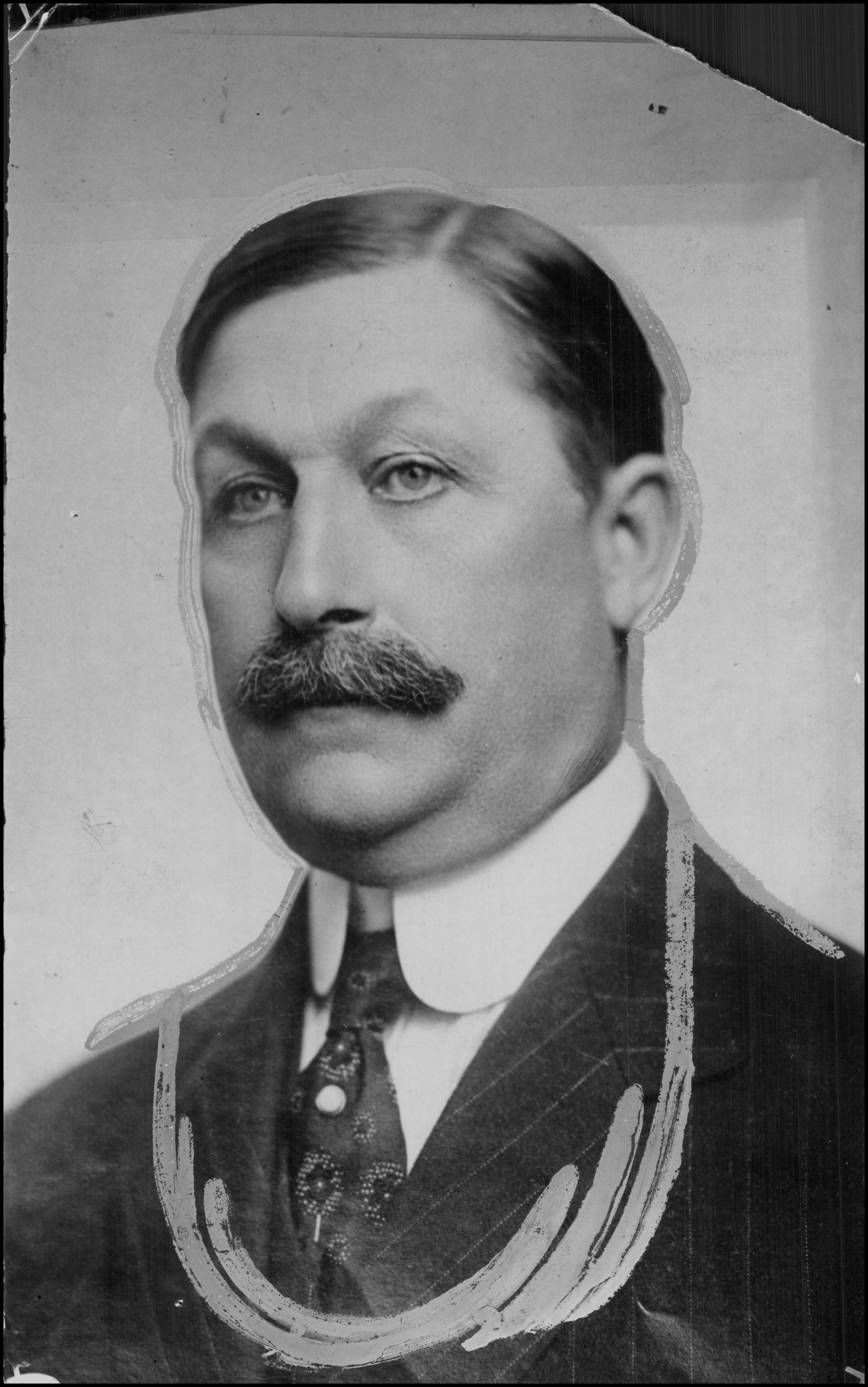
Dwinnell in 1914

William Stanley Dwinnell (December 25, 1862 – March 9, 1930) was a member of the Minnesota Senate and the Minnesota House of Representatives.

== Biography ==
Dwinnell was born on Christmas of 1862 in Lodi, Wisconsin. He began attending the University of Wisconsin-Madison in 1884 and graduated from the University of Wisconsin Law School in 1886.

In April 1889, Dwinnell married Virginia Ingman. They had three children. He died on March 9, 1930, in Pasadena, California.

== Career ==
Dwinnell was a member of the House of Representatives from 1899 to 1900 and of the Senate from 1911 to 1918. Previously, he was County Attorney of Jackson County, Wisconsin, from 1888 to 1889. He was a Republican.
