= Goeres Park =

- U.S. National Register of Historic Places
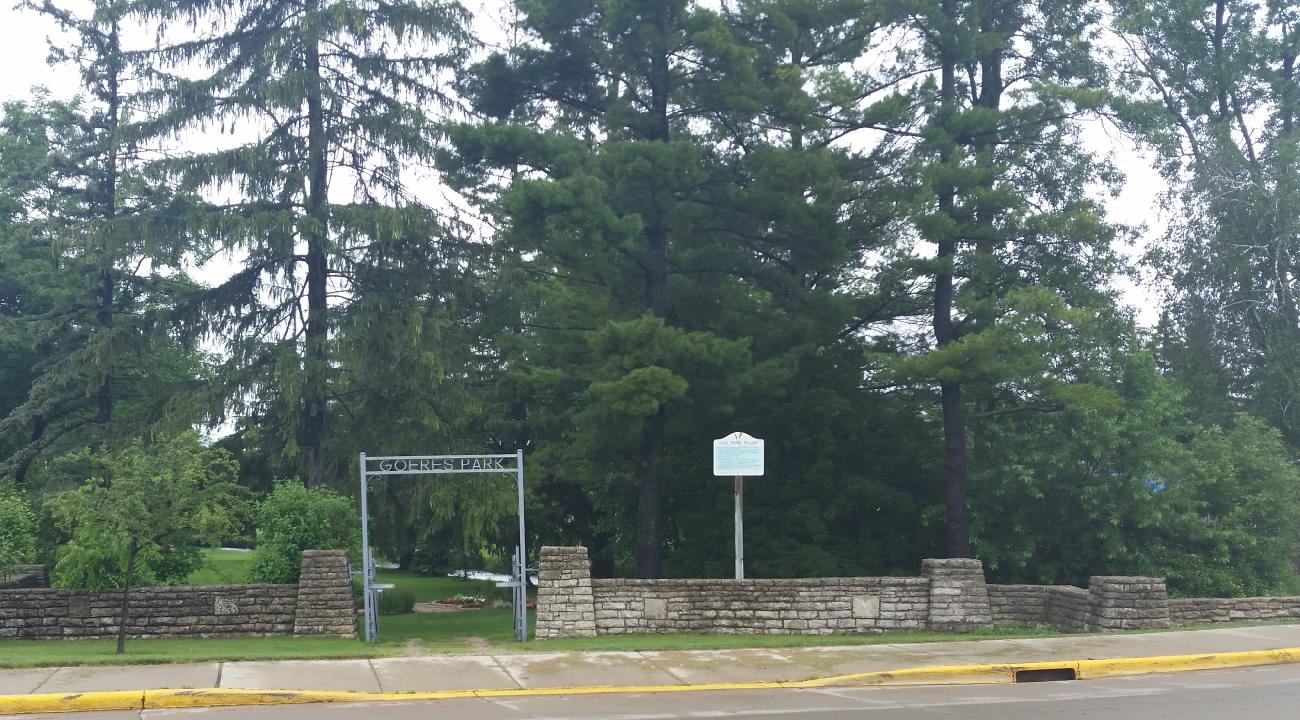
- Goeres Park in June 2015

- Location within Wisconsin Location within the United States
- Location: 101 Fair St., Lodi, Wisconsin
- Coordinates: 43°19′4″N 89°30′15″W
- Area: 7.9 acres (3.2 ha)
- Architect: Franz A. Aust
- Architectural style: Prairie School
- NRHP reference No.: 09000197
- Added to NRHP: April 9, 2009

Goeres Park is a public park in Lodi, Wisconsin, United States. The park was established in 1935, when the village bought 20 acres (0.081 km^{2}) of land for a new park and water plant. T.C. Goeres, president of the Lodi Canning Company and the park's namesake, developed the park, while Franz A. Aust, a professor of landscape architecture at the University of Wisconsin, designed it. The park is divided by Spring Creek, which is bordered by a sandstone rip-rap. Historic features in the park include a memorial to Goeres' son Robert M. Goeres and a stone fountain dedicated to Dr. E. Velna Chala. The park was added to the National Register of Historic Places on April 9, 2009.
