= Lodi School Hillside Improvement Site =

Coordinates: 43°18′40″N 89°31′33″W

- U.S. National Register of Historic Places
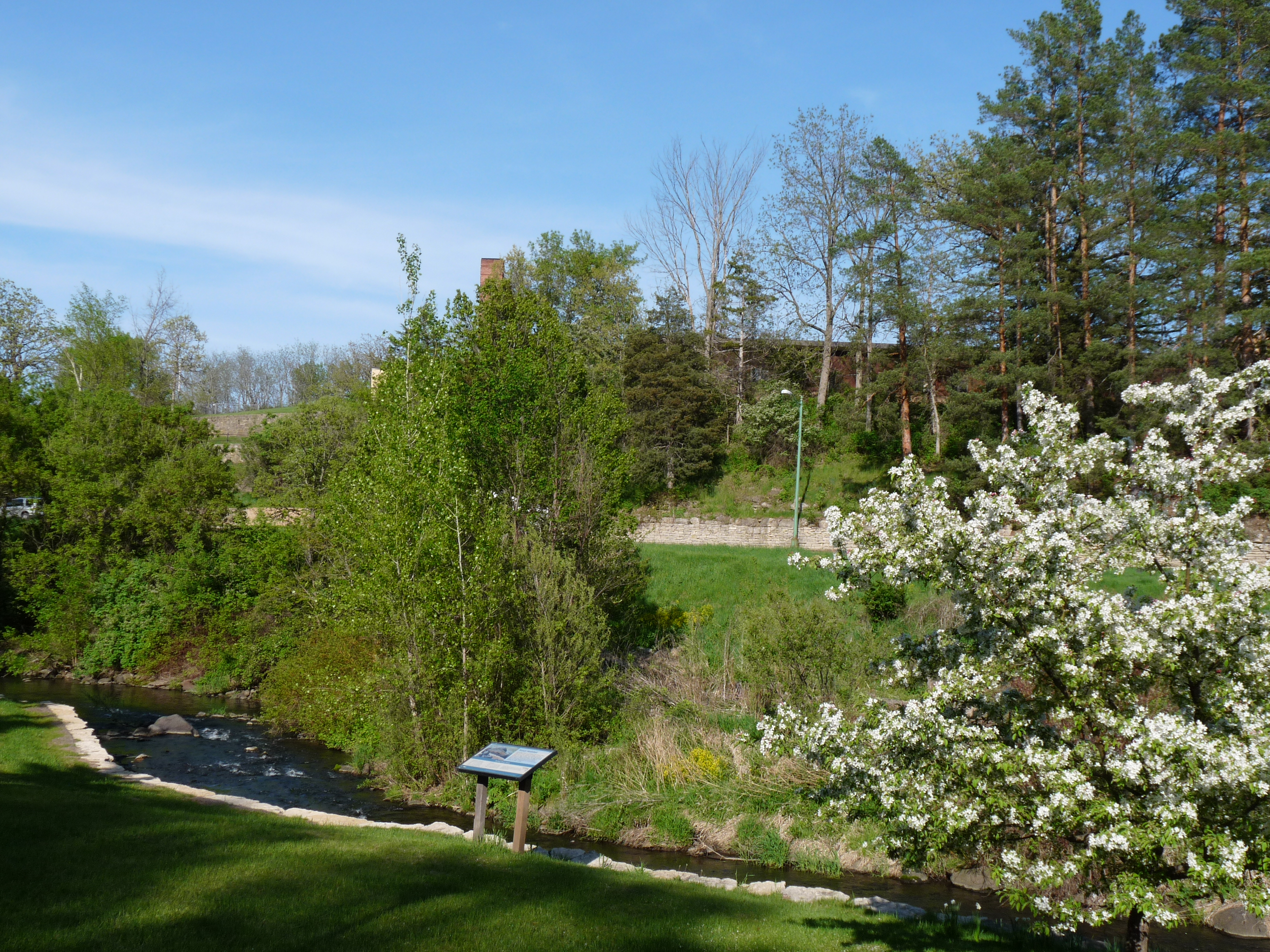
- Location: Lodi, Wisconsin
- Area: 2.8 acres (11,000 m^{2})
- Architect: Franz A. Aust
- NRHP reference No.: 09000198
- Added to NRHP: April 9, 2009

Lodi School Hillside Improvement Site, also known as Veterans Memorial Park, is a former public works project listed on the National Register of Historic Places. The site consists of two parcels located on Corner Street, between Pleasant Street and Columbus Street in Lodi, Wisconsin, United States.

== History ==
The stone retaining walls and stairways of the hillside below Lodi Primary School were a public works project from 1933 to 1938. The site was designed by the first professor of landscape architecture at the University of Wisconsin, Franz A. Aust. On the opposite side of a creek that separates the two parcels of land, Veteran's Memorial Park was completed in 1948. The site was added to the National Register of Historic Places on April 9, 2009.
