= Lodi, Wisconsin =

- City
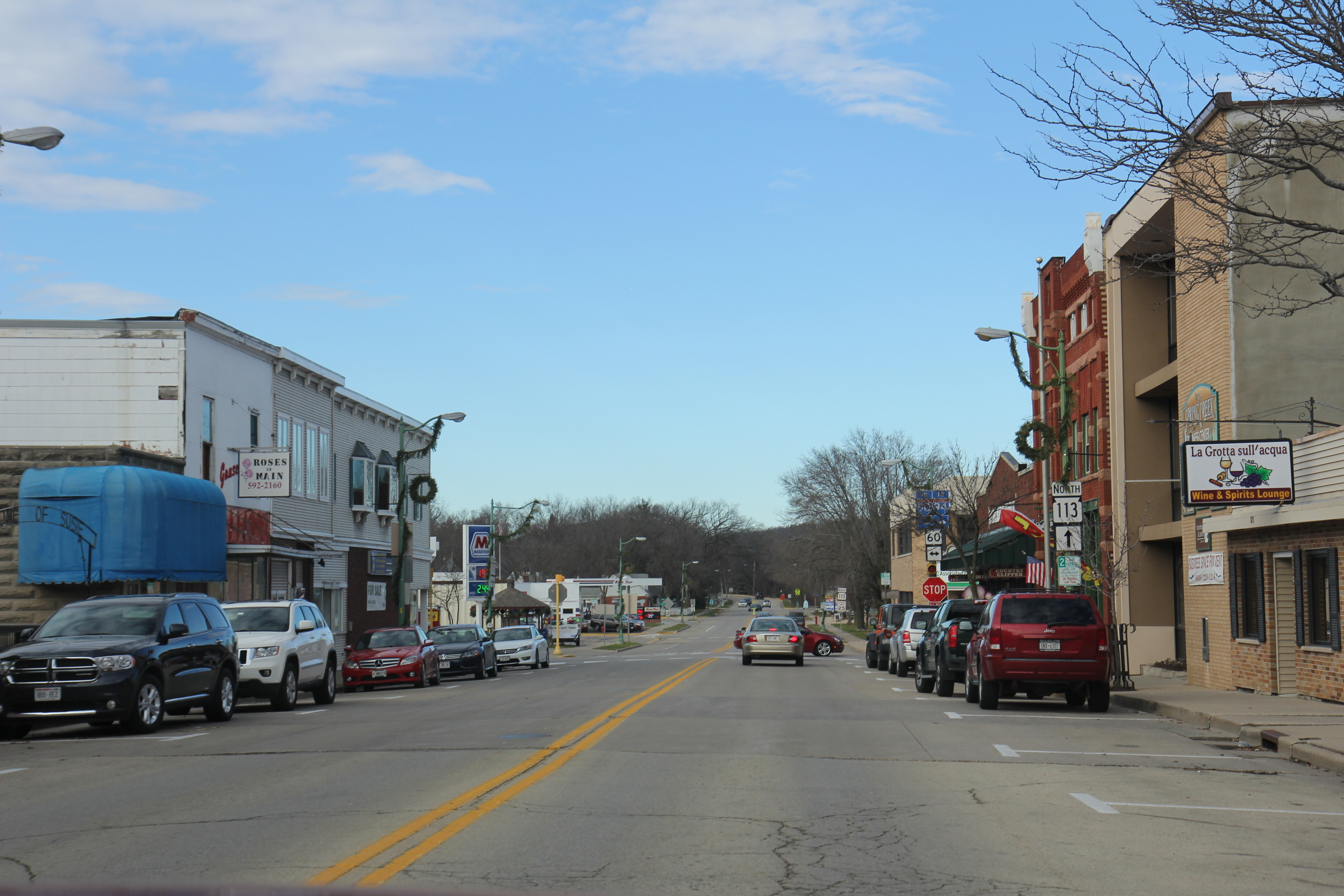
- Downtown Lodi on WIS 113
- Nickname: Home of Susie the Duck
- Location of Lodi in Columbia County, Wisconsin

- Location within Wisconsin Location within the United States
- Coordinates: 43°18′51″N 89°31′52″W
- Country: United States
- State: Wisconsin
- County: Columbia
- Founded: 1846

Government
  - Mayor: Ann Groves Lloyd

Area
  - Total: 1.73 sq mi (4.48 km^{2})
  - Land: 1.73 sq mi (4.48 km^{2})
  - Water: 0 sq mi (0 km^{2})

Population (2020)
  - Total: 3,189
  - Estimate (2021): 3,144
  - Density: 1,789.3/sq mi (690.85/km^{2})
- Time zone: UTC-6 (Central (CST))
  - Summer (DST): UTC-5 (CDT)
- Area code: 608
- FIPS code: 55-45350
- Website: https://www.cityoflodi.us/

Lodi (/ˈloʊ.daɪ/ LOH-dye) is a city in Columbia County, Wisconsin, United States. The population was 3,189 at the 2020 census. Lodi is part of the Madison metropolitan area.

== History ==
The scenic Town of Lodi area had long been a home of Native Americans before the first settlers, Marston and George Bartholomew, arrived in 1845 and staked their claim. By 1846 a county government was established which created Pleasant Valley Precinct. The Town of Lodi was created in 1849. Isaac Palmer founded the village of Lodi in 1846 in what was then the Pleasant Valley Precinct of the Wisconsin Territory. He named it after Lodi, in Italy. Palmer chose this glaciated valley as the location for the village because of its water power potential. Spring Creek powered a sawmill that year and a grist mill followed in 1850.

=== Historic places ===
- Frank T. and Polly Lewis House
- Lodi School Hillside Improvement Site
- Portage Street Historic District

== Geography ==
Lodi is located at 43°18′51″N 89°31′51″W (43.314296, −89.530994).

According to the United States Census Bureau, the city has a total area of 1.77 square miles (4.58 km^{2}), all land.

Spring Creek, which runs from the Lodi Marsh through downtown Lodi and empties into Lake Wisconsin, is a local spring-fed brown trout stream. Portions of the creek do not freeze over the winter and thus serve as host to brown trout and waterfowl, particularly mallards. Lodi has adopted a Spring Creek resident mallard, which the residents have named "Susie the Duck", as a mascot.

The city is completely surrounded by the town of Lodi.

== Demographics ==
Historical population
Census	Pop.	Note	%±
1870	725		—
1880	723		−0.3%
1890	736		1.8%
1900	1,068		45.1%
1910	1,044		−2.2%
1920	1,077		3.2%
1930	1,065		−1.1%
1940	1,116		4.8%
1950	1,416		26.9%
1960	1,620		14.4%
1970	1,831		13.0%
1980	1,959		7.0%
1990	2,093		6.8%
2000	2,882		37.7%
2010	3,050		5.8%
2020	3,189		4.6%
U.S. Decennial Census

=== 2010 census ===
As of the census of 2010, there were 3,050 people, 1,224 households, and 796 families residing in the city. The population density was 1,723.2 inhabitants per square mile (665.3/km^{2}). There were 1,272 housing units at an average density of 718.6 units per square mile (277.5 units/km^{2}). The racial makeup of the city was 96.3% White, 0.3% African American, 0.5% Native American, 1% Asian, 0.1% Pacific Islander, 0.8% from other races, and 1% from two or more races. Hispanic or Latino people of any race were 2% of the population.

There were 1,224 households, of which 34.0% had children under the age of 18 living with them, 49.3% were married couples living together, 10.8% had a female householder with no husband present, 5% had a male householder with no wife present, and 35% were non-families. 30.2% of all households were made up of individuals, and 13.6% had someone living alone who was 65 years of age or older. The average household size was 2.44 and the average family size was 3.04.

The median age in the city was 40.4 years. 26.4% of residents were under the age of 18; 6.6% were between the ages of 18 and 24; 24.3% were from 25 to 44; 27.2% were from 45 to 64; and 15.5% were 65 years of age or older. The gender makeup of the city was 48.9% male and 51.1% female.

=== 2000 census ===
As of the census of 2000, there were 2,882 people, 1,141 households, and 745 families residing in the city. The population density was 2,008.6 people per square mile (775.5 people/km^{2}). There were 1,199 housing units at an average density of 835.7 units per square mile (322.7 units/km^{2}). The racial makeup of the city was 98.27% White, 0.17% Black or African American, 0.28% Native American, 0.24% Asian, 0.03% Pacific Islander, 0.31% from other races, and 0.69% from two or more races. 1.01% of the population were Hispanic or Latino of any race.

There were 1,141 households, out of which 35.1% had children under the age of 18 living with them, 53.3% were married couples living together, 8.7% had a female householder with no husband present, and 34.7% were non-families. 28.8% of all households were made up of individuals, and 14.2% had someone living alone who was 65 years of age or older. The average household size was 2.44 and the average family size was 3.03.

In the city, the population was spread out, with 26.6% under the age of 18, 5.8% from 18 to 24, 31.9% from 25 to 44, 20.2% from 45 to 64, and 15.4% who were 65 years of age or older. The median age was 36 years. For every 100 females, there were 90.2 males. For every 100 females age 18 and over, there were 88 males.

The median income for a household in the city was $51,357, and the median income for a family was $57,763. Males had a median income of $37,049 versus $27,063 for females. The per capita income for the city was $23,546. About 1.6% of families and 2.7% of the population were below the poverty line, including 1.4% of those under age 18 and 9.5% of those age 65 or over.

In 2018, the median household income of Lodi residents was $72,944. Lodi households made slightly more than Shorewood households ($72,903) and Waukau households ($72,917). However, 7% of Lodi residents lived in poverty.

== Susie the Duck ==
Susie the Duck has been the town's official mascot since 1948. On Wisconsin Highway 113 in downtown Lodi is a small creek-side park where visitors can buy dried corn from vending machines to feed the wild ducks. In this area is a small stone basket, inscribed with the name of former Lodi resident Engle Knerzer, and every year a duck builds a nest there. When the first mallard settled in that location in 1948, it was nicknamed "Susie" by the granddaughter of the police chief.

There is an annual "Susie the Duck Day" celebration, the highlight of which is the rubber duck race. Participants pay a fee for a small rubber duck. The thousands of ducks are then dumped into the creek where they "race" toward a finish line and prizes are awarded based on order of finish. The day's celebrations also include a parade, activities in Goeres Park, brat stands on Main Street and in Goeres Park, and a beer garden in the park.

== Recreation ==
=== Lodi Agricultural Fair ===
Lodi is one of three cities in Wisconsin to have its own fair. This free fair begins on the first Thursday of July and runs through Sunday. Exhibits include livestock judging, school artwork, baking contests, and local organization display booths. There are carnival rides and games. Attractions include tractor pulls, a demolition derby, a live music beer garden, and a high school alumni softball tournament. In 2015, the Lodi Agricultural Fair marked its 150th anniversary, which was celebrated by adding an additional day onto the event.

=== Ice Age Trail ===
A portion of the Ice Age National Scenic Trail runs through Lodi. The longest section of the trail in the area is about 6.2 miles. It begins at the Robertson Trailhead, south of Lodi on Lodi-Springfield Road off of Hwy. 60 West. Several other segments of the trail are located in or near Lodi, including a 1.3-mile segment on the corner of Lovering and Highway J and a 21-mile section north of the Colsac III Ferry on Lake Wisconsin.

== Transportation ==
=== Major highways ===
- Wisconsin Highway 60 - heads west to Prairie du Sac and Sauk City; east to I-39/90/94, Arlington, and Columbus
- Wisconsin Highway 113 - heads south to Dane and Waunakee; north to Lake Wisconsin, the Merrimac Ferry, and Baraboo. Serves as the city's Main Street.

=== Airport ===
The Lodi Lakeland Airport (FAA ID 9WN5) is a publicly owned general aviation airport 1 mile (1.6 km) north of the city center. The airport is owned by the town of Lodi and operated by a local organization.

=== Railroad ===
A Wisconsin and Southern (reporting mark WSOR) railroad line runs through town en route north to Baraboo and Reedsburg and south to Dane, Waunakee, and Madison.

This section of railroad was formerly the CNW mainline, reached Lodi in 1872 and was fully completed in 1873, and linked Milwaukee and Fond Du Lac, with intercity travel provided in the towns in between by C&NW. Two sets of tracks were originally built, although only one remains today in most locations along this line. It was then briefly owned by Union Pacific Railroad after it merged with CNW in 1995, and a lease was signed in 1996 by Wisconsin and Southern for rights to this trackage included in a Madison-area ex-C&NW trackage deal. The line now runs through Lodi from Madison to Reedsburg, and trains that run along it are recognized as L463. Ex-Union Pacific and ex-Burlington Northern units that now belong to WSOR still occasionally run in the area, although most have been repainted.

During the line's early days, Lodi had a depot where trains could refill with water, fuel, receive and deport cargo and passengers, and send telegraphs. The depot and adjacent feed mill have long been demolished, but its foundation and platform still remains between the Church Street grade crossing and the Sauk Street grade crossing, and a barren lot remains where they once stood. The Lodi Canning Company is still capable of cargo shipments consisting mainly of canned vegetables and plant products. The plant's siding has been seen storing track maintenance equipment such as tamping machines and rolling stock.

== Notable people ==
- Arnie F. Betts, Wisconsin State Representative, lived in Lodi
- William G. Bissell, Wisconsin State Senator, lived in Lodi
- Robert Caldwell, Wisconsin state legislator, president of the village of Lodi
- Joseph Detmer, athlete, lived in Lodi
- William S. Dwinnell, former Minnesota State Senator, born in Lodi
- Harold Groves, Wisconsin State legislator, born in Lodi
- William P. Groves, Wisconsin State Representative, born in Lodi
- Sarah Keyeski, Wisconsin State Senator, lives in Lodi
- Scott McCallum, former Governor of Wisconsin, lives in Lodi
- Albert O'Connor, Medal of Honor recipient, lived in Lodi
- Wesley L. Packard, former Wisconsin State Representative, mayor of Lodi
- Keith Ripp, Wisconsin state legislator, lives in Lodi
- Tracy Sachtjen, Olympic athlete, world champion curler, lives in Lodi
- Tom Wopat, actor on The Dukes of Hazzard, was born in Lodi

== Images ==
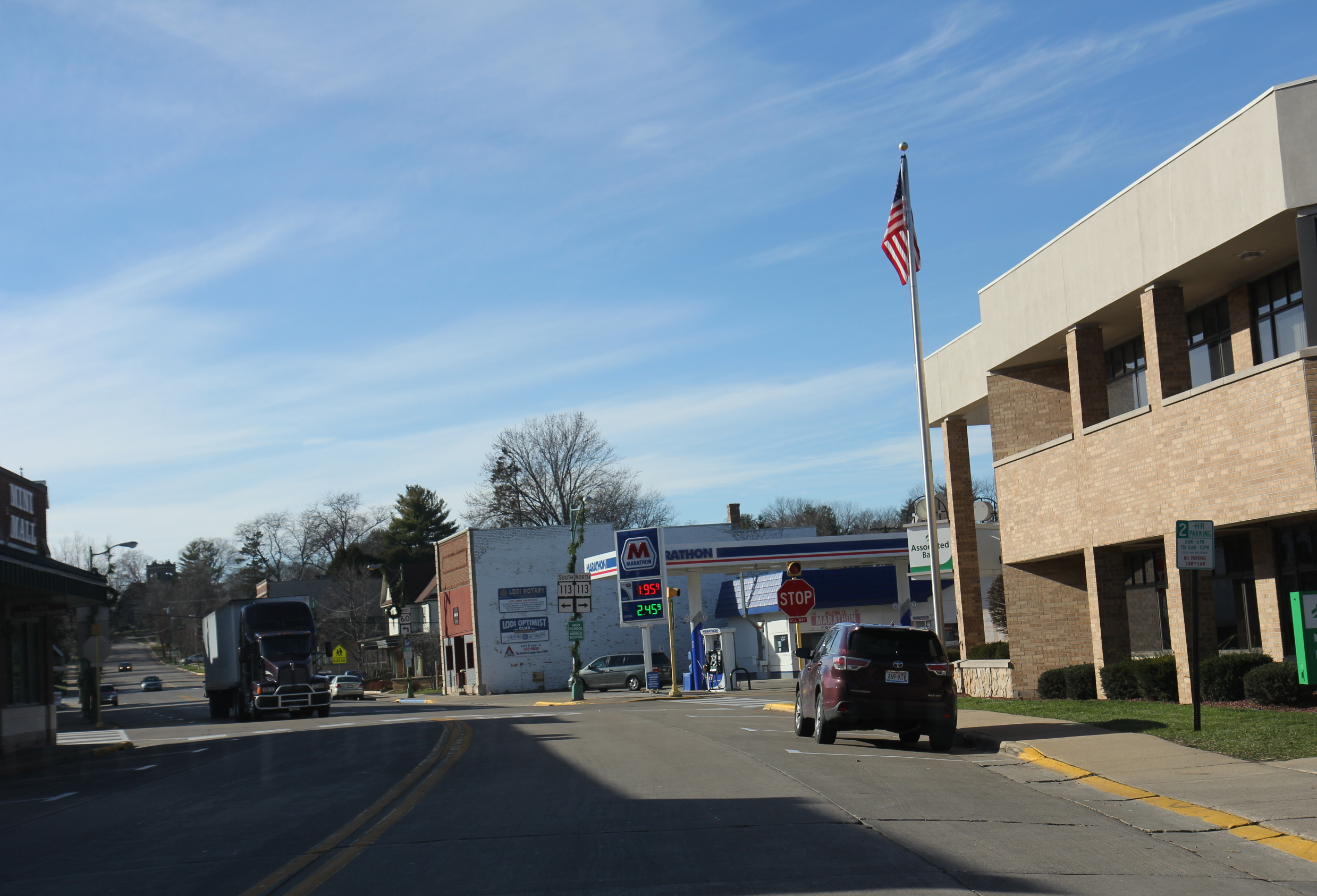
Looking west at downtown Lodi on WIS60

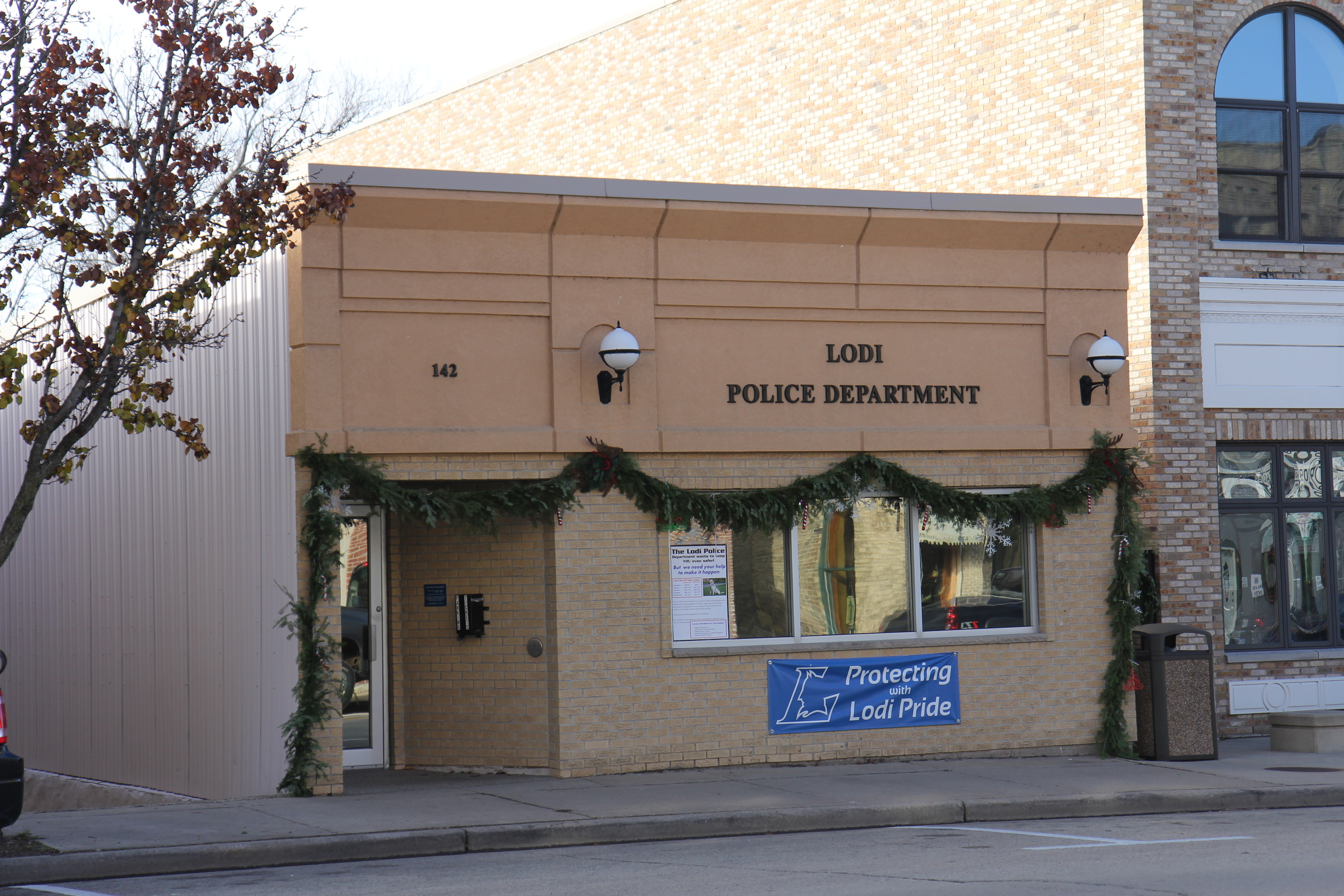
Police department

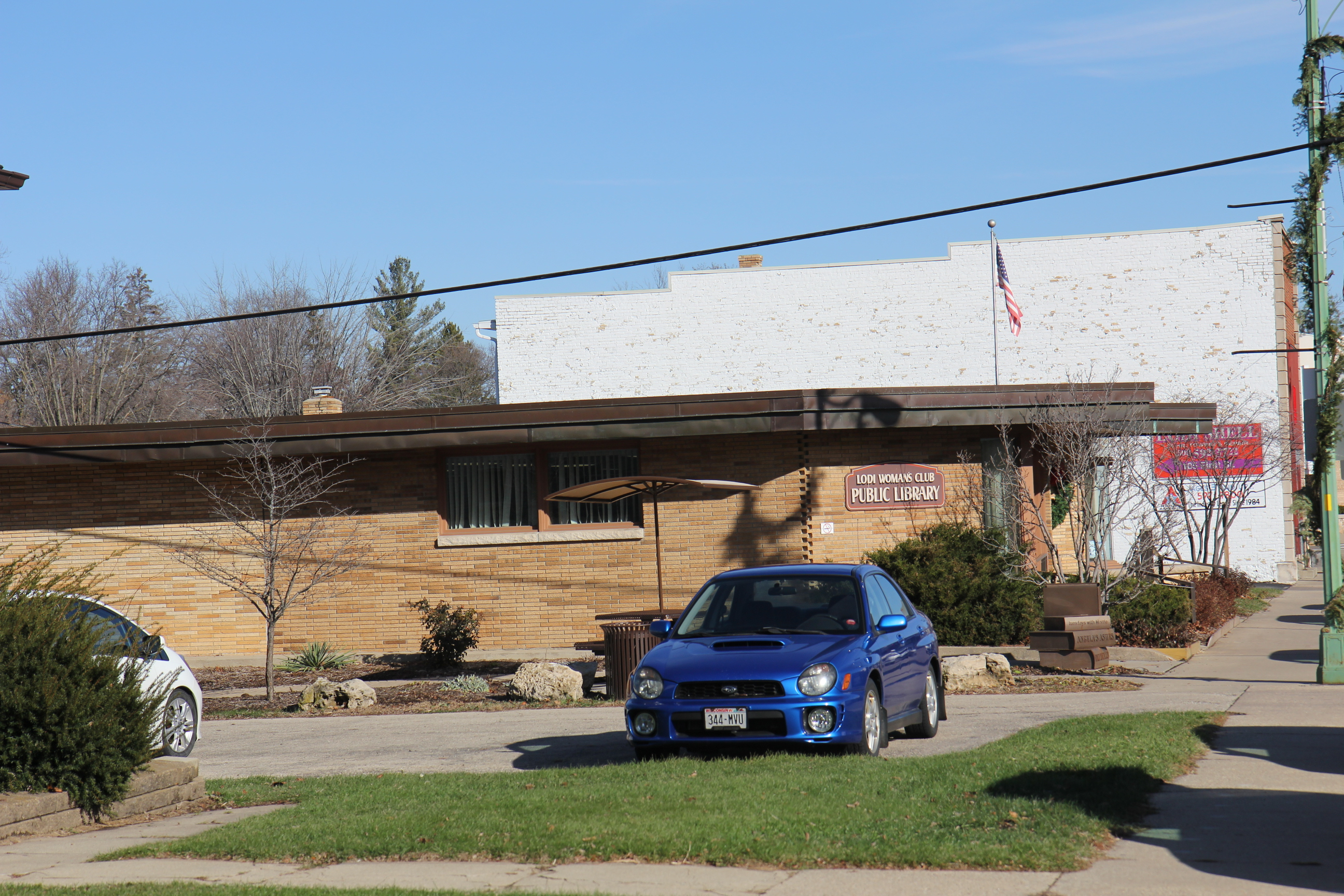
Public library

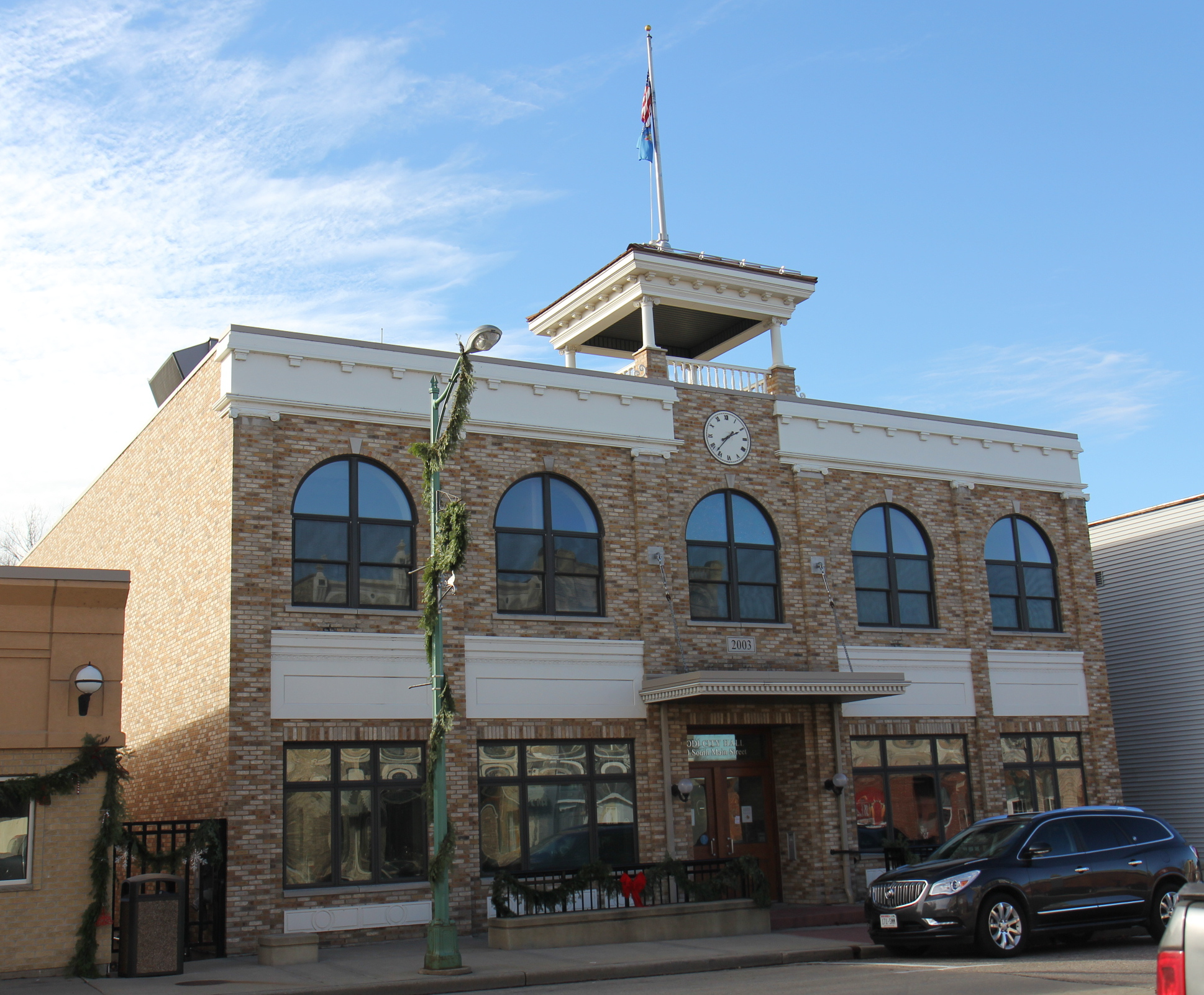
City hall

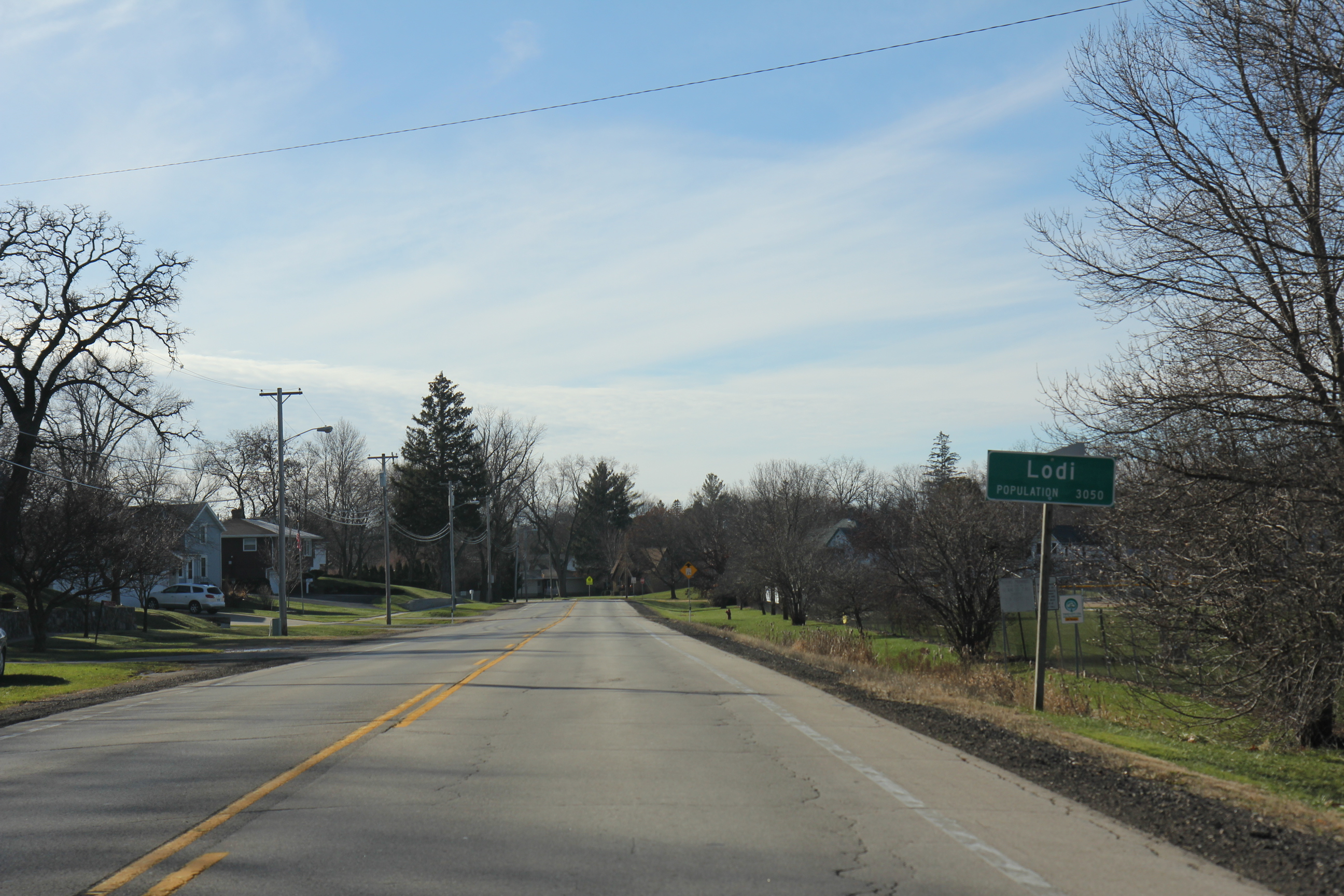
Looking west at the sign for Lodi on WIS60

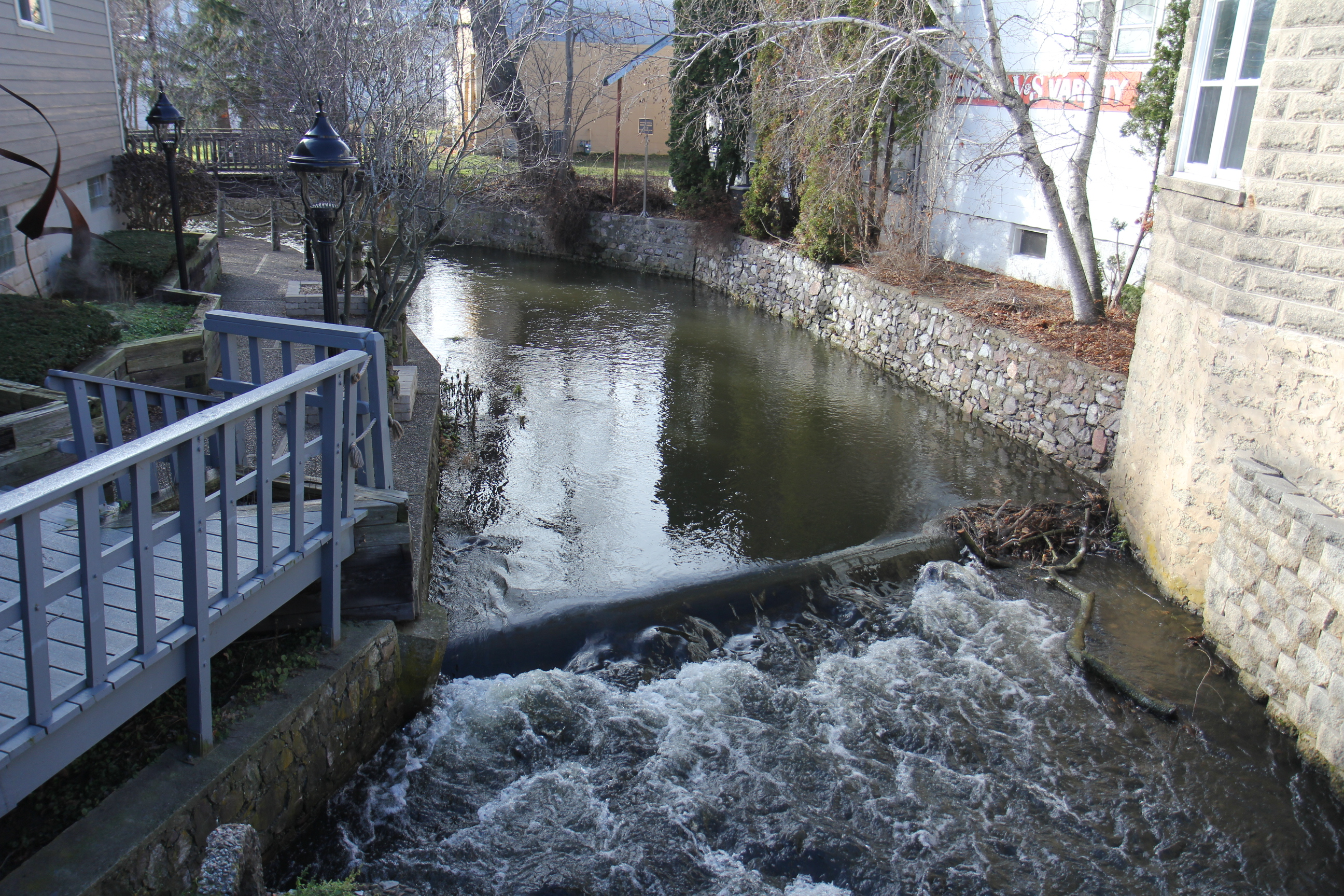
Spring Creek Park in downtown Lodi

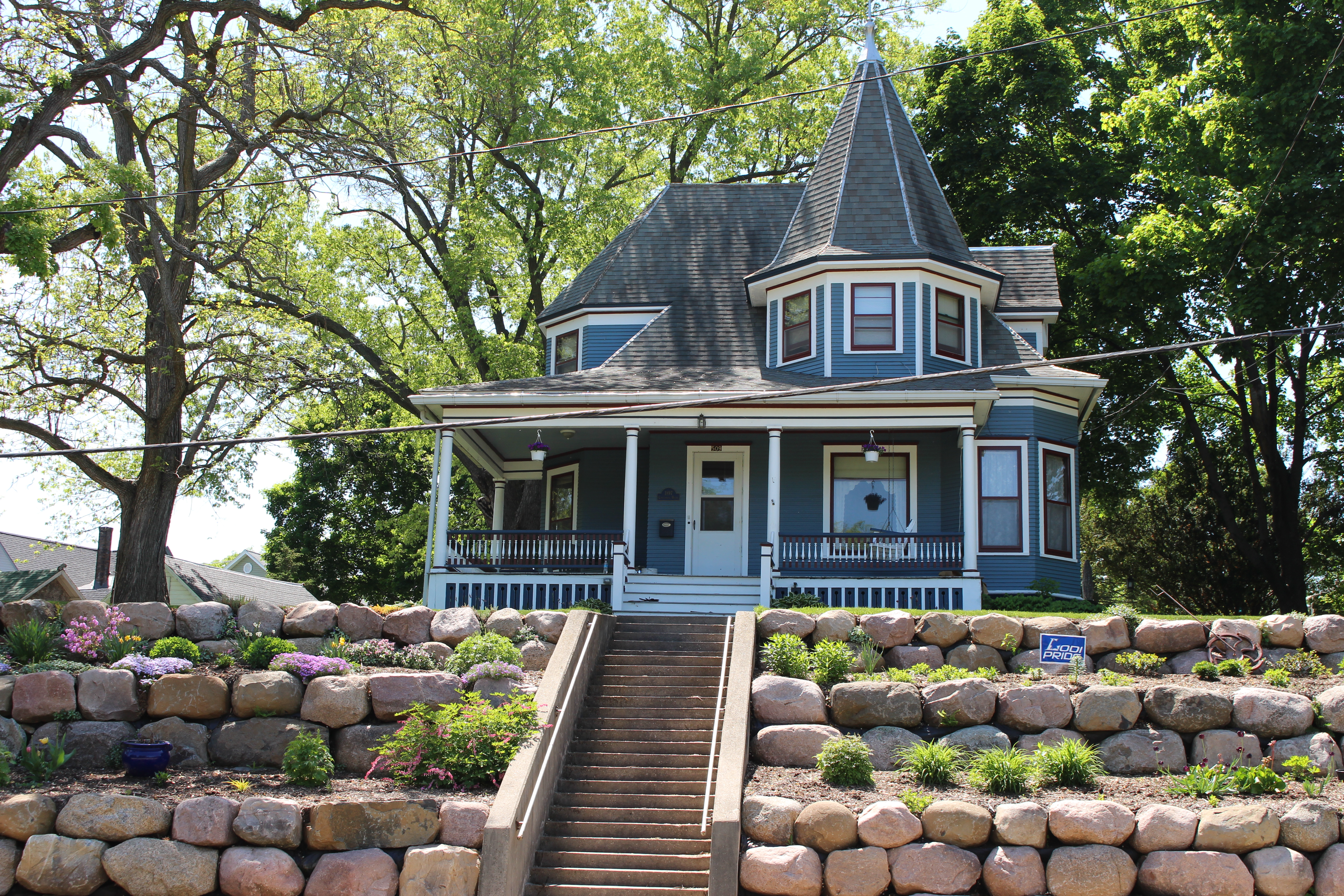
Frank T. and Polly Lewis House

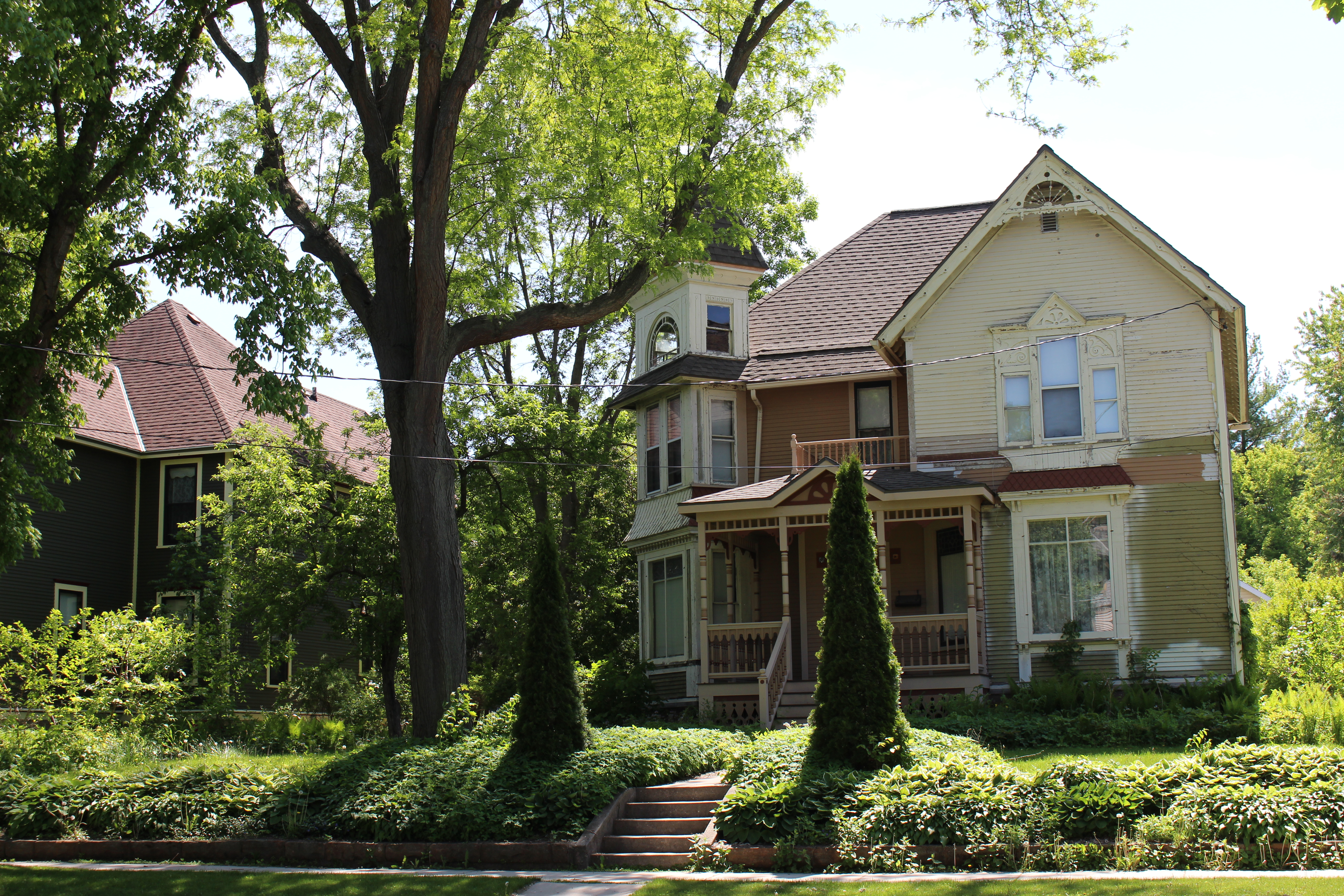
Part of the Lodi Street-Prairie Street Historic District

== See also ==
- Lodi High School
