= Portage Street Historic District =

Historic district in Wisconsin, United States

- U.S. National Register of Historic Places
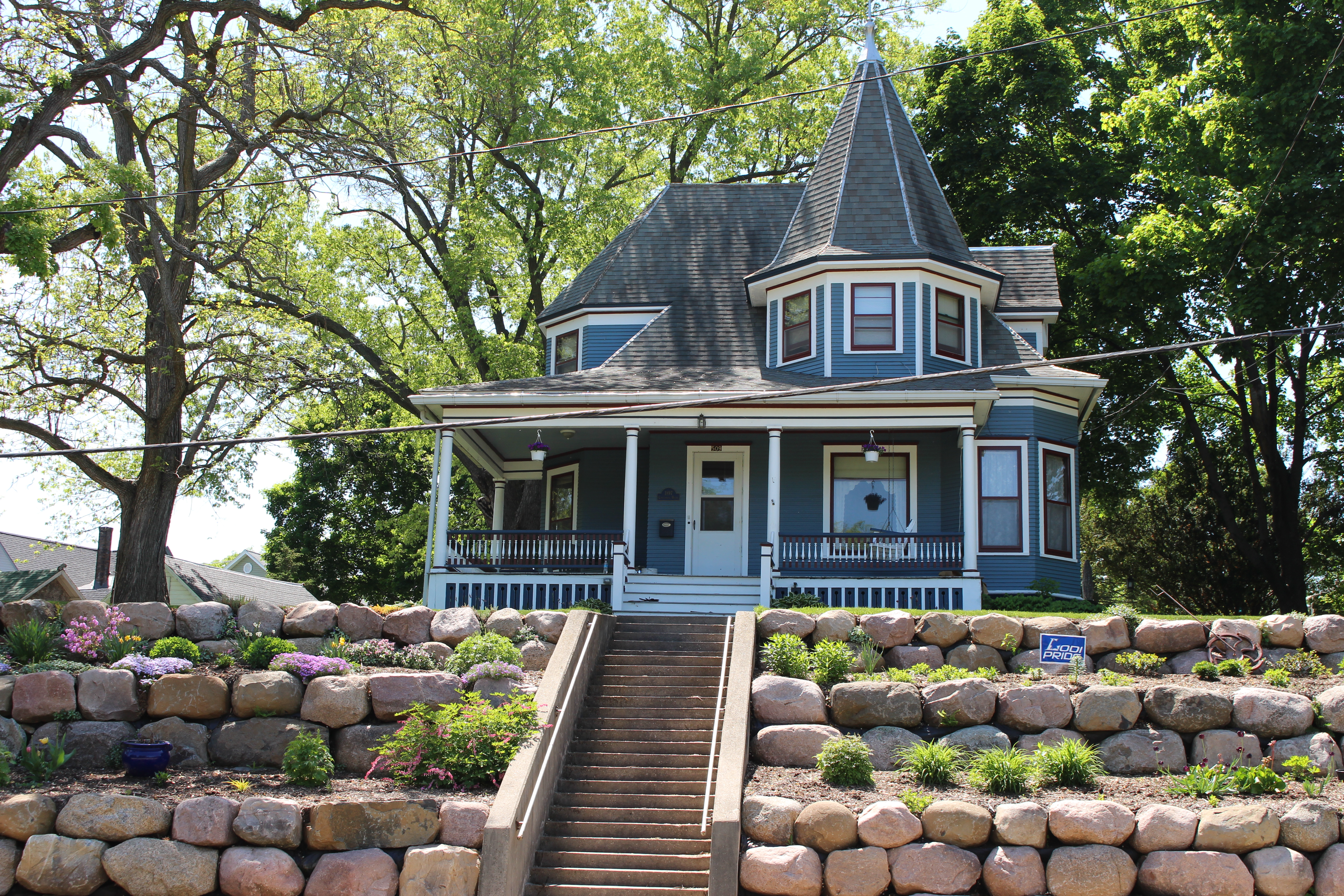
- Frank T. and Polly Lewis House

- Location within Wisconsin
- Location: Roughly along Portage St. form Spring to Parr Sts., Lodi, Wisconsin
- Coordinates: 43°18′53″N 89°31′29″W
- Area: 4 acres (1.6 ha)
- NRHP reference No.: 00000626
- Added to NRHP: June 2, 2000

The Portage Street Historic District is a residential historic district encompassing a one-block section of Portage Street in Lodi, Wisconsin. The district includes seven houses, two carriage barns, and a church; nine of the ten buildings are considered contributing buildings to the district's historic character. The Gothic Revival style Universalist Church, built in 1873-74, is the oldest building in the district. The two oldest houses in the district are both vernacular homes with gable ell plans, a form featuring a front-facing gabled main block with a side wing. Four houses and both carriage barns have Queen Anne designs and were built in the 1890s and early 1900s, the peak of the style's popularity. Prominent Lodi architect Carl C. Menes designed three of the four Queen Anne houses. The latest house in the district, the 1922 Irvin G. Searles House, has a bungalow design.

The district was added to the National Register of Historic Places on June 2, 2000. The Frank T. and Polly Lewis House within the district is listed independently on the National Register.
