= National Register of Historic Places listings in Olmsted County, Minnesota =

Location of Olmsted County in Minnesota

This is a list of the National Register of Historic Places listings in Olmsted County, Minnesota. It is intended to be a complete list of the properties and districts on the National Register of Historic Places in Olmsted County, Minnesota, United States. The locations of National Register properties and districts for which the latitude and longitude coordinates are included below, may be seen in an online map.

There are 25 properties and districts listed on the National Register in the county, including one National Historic Landmark. A supplementary list includes five additional sites that were formerly on the National Register. Many of the county's listings are associated with the Mayo Clinic, an influential hospital and medical research facility founded in 1889.

This National Park Service list is complete through NPS recent listings posted September 19, 2025.

== Current listings ==
	Name on the Register	Image	Date listed	Location	City or town	Description
1	Avalon Hotel	Avalon Hotel	March 19, 1982 (#82002992)	301 North Broadway; 44°01′35″N 92°27′48″W	Rochester	1919 hotel dating to a guest accommodation boom fueled by Mayo Clinic patients. Later Rochester's only hotel open to Black patients and travelers, reflecting the diverse but segregated clientele the clinic brought to an otherwise homogeneous Midwestern town.
2	Dr. Donald C. Balfour House	Dr. Donald C. Balfour House	July 21, 2004 (#04000723)	427 6th Avenue SW; 44°01′06″N 92°28′19″W	Rochester	1910 home of Dr. Donald Balfour (1882–1963), nationally recognized surgeon, Mayo Clinic partner, and founder of the Mayo Foundation for Medical Education and Research.
3	Benike Family Barn	Benike Family Barn	October 7, 2011 (#09000407)	5209 County Road 21 NE; 44°08′15″N 92°22′30″W	Farmington Township	Circa-1875 example of the timber-framed, three-bay barns built during a decade of increased agriculture in Olmsted County and a shift from wheat to diversified farming across southeast Minnesota.
4	John G. Bush House	John G. Bush House	July 2, 1980 (#80004531)	223 East Center Street; 43°58′29″N 92°08′11″W	Dover	Well-preserved example of Olmsted County's small-town Italianate houses, built c. 1877 for a prosperous farmer turned merchant.
5	Chateau Dodge Theatre	Chateau Dodge Theatre	July 17, 1980 (#80002098)	15 1st Street SW; 44°01′22″N 92°27′50″W	Rochester	1927 atmospheric theatre noted for its Châteauesque façade, fanciful Medieval Revival interior, and long use as a cinema.
6	Coan House	Coan House	July 2, 1980 (#80004532)	118 West 5th Street; 43°59′04″N 92°14′00″W	Eyota	Elaborately ornamented house built circa 1888; one of the best preserved examples of Olmsted County's relatively small stock of Victorian residences.
7	Eyota Farmers Cooperative Creamery Association	Eyota Farmers Cooperative Creamery Association	July 2, 1980 (#80004533)	222 Washington Avenue S. 43°59′10″N 92°13′36″W	Eyota	1924 Period Revival creamery, a distinctive emblem of Olmsted County's cooperative dairy industry.
8	Frank's Ford Bridge	Frank's Ford Bridge	July 8, 1980 (#80004534)	County Road 121 over the South Branch of the Zumbro River; 44°07′47″N 92°27′45″W	Oronoco Township	1895 through truss bridge significant for its association with Horace E. Horton (1843–1912), a bridge builder who began his career in Olmsted County and founded the regional Chicago Bridge & Iron Company in 1889.
9	Christoph Krause Farmstead	Christoph Krause Farmstead	October 10, 1980 (#80002097)	County Highway 30; 43°57′31″N 92°08′17″W	Dover Township	Well-preserved farmstead with an Italianate house and large barn dating to the 1870s, exemplifying rural Olmsted County's prosperous 19th-century farms.
10	Maass and McAndrew Company Building	Maass and McAndrew Company Building	May 24, 2016 (#16000278)	12-14 4th Street SW; 44°01′09″N 92°27′50″W	Rochester	Home of a mechanical contracting firm in operation 1909–1929, significant for designing and constructing much of the specialized equipment and facilities that helped boost the Mayo Clinic to national prominence.
11	Mayo Clinic Building	Mayo Clinic Building	August 4, 1969 (#69000075)	100 2nd St. SW; 44°01′19″N 92°27′56″W	Rochester	1928 integrated care facility better known as the Plummer Building, where doctors William James Mayo (1861–1939) and Charles Horace Mayo (1865–1939) culminated their careers leading the revolutionary first group medical practice in the United States.
12	Dr. William J. Mayo House	Dr. William J. Mayo House	March 26, 1975 (#75001001)	701 4th Street SW; 44°01′11″N 92°28′25″W	Rochester	Tudor Revival mansion built 1916–17 for Mayo Clinic co-founder Dr. William James Mayo (1861–1939). Became the Mayo Foundation House in 1938.
13	Mayowood Historic District	Mayowood Historic District	September 22, 1970 (#70000306)	3720 Mayowood Road SW; 43°59′40″N 92°31′09″W	Rochester	10-acre (4 ha) estate dating to 1911 of Charles Horace Mayo (1865–1939) and his son Charles William Mayo (1898–1968), significant for its architecture and association with the Mayo Clinic. Now a museum.
14	Oronoco School	Oronoco School	July 2, 1980 (#80004536)	25 2nd St. NW; 44°09′43″N 92°32′02″W	Oronoco	School in use 1875–1926, a well-preserved example of institutional Italianate architecture and education in Minnesota's rural communities.
15	Pill Hill Residential Historic District	Pill Hill Residential Historic District	November 29, 1990 (#85003768)	Roughly bounded by 3rd and 9th Streets and 7th and 10th Avenues SW; 44°01′02″N 92°28′32″W	Rochester	15-block neighborhood long fashionable among Rochester's numerous medical professionals, with 133 contributing properties exhibiting the architectural styles popular in the first three decades of the 20th century.
16	Pleasant Grove Masonic Lodge	Pleasant Grove Masonic Lodge	October 10, 1980 (#80002102)	Off County Highway 1; 43°52′12″N 92°23′04″W	Pleasant Grove	Both the oldest purpose-built and continuously used Masonic Temple in Minnesota, built in 1868; with a first floor community hall long serving as the area's social center.
17	Henry S. Plummer House	Henry S. Plummer House	May 21, 1975 (#75001002)	1091 Plummer Lane; 44°00′38″N 92°28′47″W	Rochester	Tudor Revival estate built 1917–1924 for pivotal Mayo Clinic doctor and architect Henry Stanley Plummer (1874–1936). Also a contributing property to the Pill Hill Residential Historic District. Now a city park and event center.
18	Rochester Armory	Rochester Armory	December 2, 1980 (#80004268)	121 North Broadway; 44°01′31″N 92°27′49″W	Rochester	Prominent 1915 example of the medieval fortress design popular for early-20th-century armories, and the local focus of Minnesota National Guard activity into the 1970s.
19	Rochester Public Library	Rochester Public Library	July 2, 1980 (#80004537)	226 2nd Street SW; 44°01′17″N 92°28′01″W	Rochester	Well-crafted and preserved example of an urban Public Works Administration project, built 1936–37. Now the Mayo Clinic Alix School of Medicine's Mitchell Student Center.
20	St. Mary's Hospital Dairy Farmstead	St. Mary's Hospital Dairy Farmstead	July 2, 1980 (#80004538)	146 60th Ave. NW; 44°01′29″N 92°33′22″W	Rochester vicinity	Massive 1923 barn built to supply pasteurized milk to the expanding patient population of St. Mary's Hospital.
21	George Stoppel Farmstead	George Stoppel Farmstead	May 12, 1975 (#75001000)	1195 W. Circle Drive; 44°00′29″N 92°30′36″W	Rochester	Locally rare surviving mid-19th-century farmstead complex with three architecturally distinctive buildings. Preserved on the grounds of the History Center of Olmsted County.
22	Toogood Barns	Toogood Barns	June 26, 1975 (#75001003)	615 16th Street SW; 44°00′01″N 92°28′21″W	Rochester	Interconnected stone barns built circa 1870; one of Minnesota's finest surviving masonry farm complexes and a symbol of its New Englander pioneers.
23	Viola Cooperative Creamery	Viola Cooperative Creamery	November 12, 1999 (#99001310)	10500 Viola Road NE; 44°03′52″N 92°16′11″W	Viola	Creamery in operation 1924–1948, representing the cooperative dairy movement of the first half of the 20th century and the heyday of small, specialty creameries.
24	Milo White House	Milo White House	March 19, 1982 (#82002991)	122 Burr Oak Street; 43°51′02″N 92°11′18″W	Chatfield	Elaborate Queen Anne house built 1883–84 for settler and politician Milo White (1830–1913).
25	Timothy A. Whiting House	Timothy A. Whiting House	December 4, 1980 (#80004269)	225 1st Avenue NW; 44°01′34″N 92°27′54″W	Rochester	Well-preserved example of an Italianate house, built in 1875 during Rochester's initial development as a center of agricultural commerce. Now the Heritage House Victorian Museum.

== Former listings ==
	Name on the Register	Image	Date listed	Date removed	Location	City or town	Description
1	Chicago Great Western Railroad Company Depot	Chicago Great Western Railroad Company Depot	December 4, 1980 (#80004267)	November 13, 1987	88 South Park Avenue and 130 South Park Avenue (original address); Current coordinates are 44°01′08″N 92°27′41″W	Rochester	1900 Chicago Great Western Railway depot. Moved in 1987.
2	Cutting Barn		October 22, 1980 (#80002099)	May 4, 1984	3210 19th Street, N.W.	Rochester	1868 limestone barn of a prosperous early farm. Destroyed by an accidental fire on January 24, 1982.
3	Hotel Zumbro	Hotel Zumbro	October 10, 1980 (#80002100)	March 28, 1988	101 First Avenue, S.W.	Rochester	1912 hotel catering to Mayo Clinic patients and their families. Demolished by owners in 1987 to make way for a modern replacement.
4	Charles H. Mayo House		July 2, 1980 (#80004535)	September 25, 1987	419 Fourth Street, S.W.	Rochester	1903 house of Dr. Charles Horace Mayo. Demolished as a condition of land sale back to the Mayo Clinic in 1987.
5	Pierce House	Pierce House	July 21, 1980 (#80002101)	November 7, 2016	426 Second Avenue, S.W. 44°01′06″N 92°27′56″W	Rochester	1877 brick Italianate hotel which became a nursing school and later apartments. Demolished June 5, 2007.

== See also ==
- List of National Historic Landmarks in Minnesota
- National Register of Historic Places listings in Minnesota
