= Minnesota's 8th Senate district =

American legislative district

Minnesota's 8th State Senate district
Senator
Jen McEwen; DFL–Duluth
since 2021
- Demographics: 87.0% White; 2.5% Black; 2.8% Hispanic; 1.7% Asian; 1.6% Native American <0.1% Hawaiian/Pacific Islander; 0.2% Other; 4.2% Multiracial
- Population: 85,283

Minnesota Senate District 8 includes the city of Duluth in St. Louis County. It is currently represented by Jen McEwen of the Democratic–Farmer–Labor Party who has been in office since 2021.

== List of senators ==
Session	Image	Senator	Party	Term start	Term end	Home	Location
1st		Charles H. Lindsley	Rep	December 2, 1857	December 6, 1859	Rochester	Olmstead
1st		Emerson Hodges	Non	December 2, 1857	January 7, 1861	Eyota	Olmstead
2nd		Emerson Hodges	Non	December 2, 1857	January 7, 1861	Marion	Olmstead
3rd		Michael Cook	Rep	January 8, 1861	January 5, 1863	Faribault	Rice
4th		Michael Cook	Rep	January 8, 1861	January 5, 1863	Faribault	Rice
5th		John McDonogh Berry	Non	January 6, 1863	January 2, 1865	Faribault	Rice
6th		John McDonogh Berry	Non	January 6, 1863	January 2, 1865	Faribault	Rice
7th		Levi Nutting	Non	January 3, 1865	January 1866	Faribault	Rice
8th		Gordon E. Cole	Rep	January 1866	January 7, 1867	Faribault	Rice
9th		Oscar F. Perkins	Rep	January 8, 1867	January 4, 1869	Faribault	Rice
10th		Oscar F. Perkins	Rep	January 8, 1867	January 4, 1869	Faribault	Rice
11th		George Washington Batchelder	Rep	January 5, 1869	January 2, 1871	Faribault	Rice
12th		George Washington Batchelder	Rep	January 5, 1869	January 2, 1871	Faribault	Rice
13th		John Higley Case	Non	January 3, 1871	January 1, 1872	Faribault	Rice
14th		William H. Stevens	Rep	January 2, 1872	January 5, 1874	Winona	Winona
15th		William H. Stevens	Rep	January 2, 1872	January 5, 1874	Winona	Winona
16th		Charles Henry Berry	Non	January 6, 1874	January 3, 1876	Winona	Winona
17th		Charles Henry Berry	Non	January 6, 1874	January 3, 1876	Winona	Winona
18th		William Hall Yale	Rep	January 4, 1876	January 7, 1878	Winona	Winona
19th		William Hall Yale	Rep	January 4, 1876	January 7, 1878	Winona	Winona
20th		W.S. Drew	Dem	January 8, 1878	January 6, 1879	Winona	Winona
21st		Cornelius F. Buck	Dem	January 7, 1879	January 1, 1883	Winona	Olmsted Wabasha Winona
22nd		Cornelius F. Buck	Dem	January 7, 1879	January 1, 1883	Winona	Olmsted Wabasha Winona
23rd		George Knudson	Non	January 2, 1883	January 3, 1887	St. James	Cottonwood Watonwan
24th		George Knudson	Non	January 2, 1883	January 3, 1887	St. James	Cottonwood Watonwan
25th		John Clark	Rep	January 4, 1887	January 5, 1891	Windom	Cottonwood Watonwan
26th		John Clark	Rep	January 4, 1887	January 5, 1891	Windom	Cottonwood Watonwan
27th		Eric Sevatson	Alliance	January 6, 1891	January 2, 1899	Windom	Cottonwood Jackson
28th		Eric Sevatson	Alliance	January 6, 1891	January 2, 1899	Christiana	Cottonwood Jackson
29th		Eric Sevatson	Populist	January 6, 1891	January 2, 1899	Christiana	Cottonwood Jackson
30th		Eric Sevatson	Populist	January 6, 1891	January 2, 1899	Christiana	Cottonwood Jackson
31st		William Gausewitz	Dem	January 3, 1899	January 5, 1903	Owatanna	Steele
32nd		William Gausewitz	Dem	January 3, 1899	January 5, 1903	Owatanna	Steele
33rd		George W. Peachy	Rep	January 6, 1903	January 7, 1907	Owatanna	Steele
34th		George W. Peachy	Rep	January 6, 1903	January 7, 1907	Owatanna	Steele
35th		Thomas E. Cashman	Dem	January 8, 1907	January 4, 1915	Owatanna	Steele
36th		Thomas E. Cashman	Dem	January 8, 1907	January 4, 1915	Owatanna	Steele
37th		Thomas E. Cashman	Dem	January 8, 1907	January 4, 1915	Owatanna	Steele
38th		Thomas E. Cashman	Dem	January 8, 1907	January 4, 1915	Owatanna	Steele
39th		John Wesley Andrews	Con	January 5, 1915	January 6, 1919	Mankato	Blue Earth
40th		John Wesley Andrews	Con	January 5, 1915	January 6, 1919	Mankato	Blue Earth
41st		Gustaf Widell	Non	January 7, 1919	January 1, 1923	Mankato	Blue Earth
42nd		Gustaf Widell	Non	January 7, 1919	January 1, 1923	Mankato	Blue Earth
43rd		W.A. Just	Dem	January 2, 1923	January 3, 1927	Rapidan	Blue Earth
44th		W.A. Just	Dem	January 2, 1923	January 3, 1927	Rapidan	Blue Earth
45th		Gustaf Widell	Non	January 4, 1927	January 7, 1935	Mankato	Blue Earth
46th		Gustaf Widell	Non	January 4, 1927	January 7, 1935	Mankato	Blue Earth
47th		Gustaf Widell	Non	January 4, 1927	January 7, 1935	Mankato	Blue Earth
48th		Gustaf Widell	Non	January 4, 1927	January 7, 1935	Mankato	Blue Earth
49th		Val Imm	Con	January 8, 1935	January 7, 1963	Mankato	Blue Earth
50th		Val Imm	Con	January 8, 1935	January 7, 1963	Mankato	Blue Earth
51st		Val Imm	Con	January 8, 1935	January 7, 1963	Mankato	Blue Earth
52nd		Val Imm	Con	January 8, 1935	January 7, 1963	Mankato	Blue Earth
53rd		Val Imm	Con	January 8, 1935	January 7, 1963	Mankato	Blue Earth
54th		Val Imm	Con	January 8, 1935	January 7, 1963	Mankato	Blue Earth
55th		Val Imm	Con	January 8, 1935	January 7, 1963	Mankato	Blue Earth
56th		Val Imm	Con	January 8, 1935	January 7, 1963	Mankato	Blue Earth
57th		Val Imm	Con	January 8, 1935	January 7, 1963	Mankato	Blue Earth
58th		Val Imm	Con	January 8, 1935	January 7, 1963	Mankato	Blue Earth
59th		Val Imm	Con	January 8, 1935	January 7, 1963	Mankato	Blue Earth
60th		Val Imm	Con	January 8, 1935	January 7, 1963	Mankato	Blue Earth
61st		Val Imm	Con	January 8, 1935	January 7, 1963	Mankato	Blue Earth
62nd		Val Imm	Con	January 8, 1935	January 7, 1963	Mankato	Blue Earth
63rd		Harold S. Nelson	Con	January 8, 1963	January 2, 1967	Owatanna	Steele Waseca
64th		Harold S. Nelson	Con	January 8, 1963	January 2, 1967	Owatanna	Steele Waseca
65th		Robert J. Brown	Con	January 3, 1967	January 1, 1973	Stillwater	Washington
66th		Robert J. Brown	Con	January 3, 1967	January 1, 1973	Stillwater	Washington
67th		Robert J. Brown	Con	January 3, 1967	January 1, 1973	Stillwater	Washington
68th		Ralph Doty	DFL	January 2, 1973	January 3, 1977	Duluth	St. Louis
69th		Ralph Doty	DFL	January 2, 1973	January 3, 1977	Duluth	St. Louis
70th		Jim Ulland	Ind. Rep	January 4, 1977	January 9, 1985	Duluth	St. Louis
71st		Jim Ulland	Ind. Rep	January 4, 1977	January 9, 1985	Duluth	St. Louis
72nd		Jim Ulland	Ind. Rep	January 4, 1977	January 9, 1985	Duluth	St. Louis
73rd		Jim Ulland	Ind. Rep	January 4, 1977	January 9, 1985	Duluth	Carlton St. Louis
74th		Jim Ulland	Ind. Rep	January 4, 1977	January 9, 1985	Duluth	Carlton St. Louis
74th		Vacant		January 9, 1985	February 11, 1985	Duluth	Carlton St. Louis
75th		Jim Gustafson	Ind. Rep	February 11, 1985	May 20, 1992	Duluth	Carlton St. Louis
76th		Jim Gustafson	Ind. Rep	February 11, 1985	May 20, 1992	Duluth	Carlton St. Louis
77th		Jim Gustafson	Ind. Rep	February 11, 1985	May 20, 1992	Duluth	Carlton St. Louis
77th		Vacant		May 20, 1992	January 5, 1993	Duluth	Carlton St. Louis
78th		Florian Chmielewski	DFL	January 5, 1993	January 6, 1997	Sturgeon Lake	Aitkin Carlton Pine St. Louis
79th		Florian Chmielewski	DFL	January 5, 1993	January 6, 1997	Sturgeon Lake	Aitkin Carlton Pine St. Louis
80th		Becky Lourey	DFL	January 7, 1997	January 2, 2007	Kerrick	Aitkin Carlton Pine St. Louis
81st		Becky Lourey	DFL	January 7, 1997	January 2, 2007	Kerrick	Aitkin Carlton Pine St. Louis
82nd		Becky Lourey	DFL	January 7, 1997	January 2, 2007	Kerrick	Aitkin Carlton Pine St. Louis
83rd		Becky Lourey	DFL	January 7, 1997	January 2, 2007	Kerrick	Carlton Isanti Kanabec Pine St. Louis
84th		Becky Lourey	DFL	January 7, 1997	January 2, 2007	Kerrick	Carlton Isanti Kanabec Pine St. Louis
85th		Tony Lourey	DFL	January 3, 2007	January 7, 2013	Kerrick	Carlton Isanti Kanabec Pine St. Louis
86th		Tony Lourey	DFL	January 3, 2007	January 7, 2013	Kerrick	Carlton Isanti Kanabec Pine St. Louis
87th		Tony Lourey	DFL	January 3, 2007	January 7, 2013	Kerrick	Carlton Isanti Kanabec Pine St. Louis
88th		Bill Ingebrigtsen	Rep	January 8, 2013	January 5, 2021	Alexandria	Douglas Grant Otter Tail Stevens Todd
89th		Bill Ingebrigtsen	Rep	January 8, 2013	January 5, 2021	Alexandria	Douglas Grant Otter Tail Stevens Todd
90th		Bill Ingebrigtsen	Rep	January 8, 2013	January 5, 2021	Alexandria	Douglas Grant Otter Tail Stevens Todd
91st		Jen McEwen	DFL	January 5, 2021	Incumbent	Duluth	St. Louis
92nd		Jen McEwen	DFL	January 5, 2021	Incumbent	Duluth	St. Louis
93rd		Jen McEwen	DFL	January 5, 2021	Incumbent	Duluth	St. Louis
