= Senator Lourey =

Senator Lourey may refer to:

- Becky Lourey (born 1943), Minnesota State Senate
- Tony Lourey (born 1967), Minnesota State Senate

== See also ==
- Joel Lourie (born 1962), South Carolina State Senate
