= Emerson Hodges =

American politician and auditor (1826–1888)

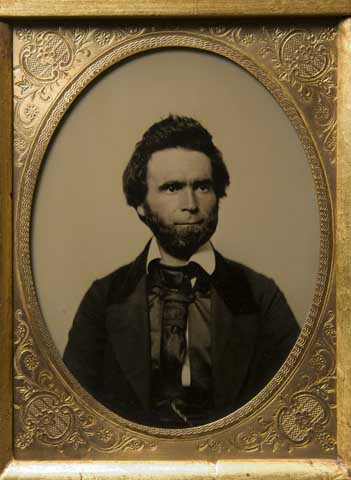
- Hodges c. 1858

Member of the Minnesota Senate from the 8th District
- In office December 2, 1857 – January 7, 1861 Serving with Charles H. Lindsley
- Governor: Samuel Medary; Alexander Ramsey
- Succeeded by: Michael Cook

Personal details
- Born: June 27, 1826 Henrietta, New York, U.S.
- Died: January 20, 1888 (aged 61) Washington, D.C., U.S.
- Resting place: Rock Creek Cemetery
- Other political affiliations: Nonpartisan

Emerson Hodges (June 27, 1826 – January 20, 1888) was an American lawyer, politician, farmer, and early citizen of Olmsted County, Minnesota. Emerson served two consecutive terms in the Minnesota Legislature from 1857 to 1861 as a member of the Minnesota Senate representing Minnesota's 8th Senate district.

== Early life ==
Hodges was born on June 27, 1826 in Henrietta, New York.^{:371} Hodges was educated at Dartmouth College where he graduated in 1849.^{:372}^{:38} Following his education Hodges moved to Fond du Lac, Wisconsin where he practiced law.^{:372} While in Fond du Lac Hodges served as the superintendent of schools.^{:372}

Hodges later moved to Minnesota Territory in 1856 due to poor health and settled in the village of Eyota, Minnesota in Olmsted County, Hodges later moved to Marion, Minnesota.^{:372}

== Politics ==
In 1857 Hodges campaigned as a nonpartisan for a position in the Minnesota Legislature for a seat in the Minnesota Senate representing Minnesota's 8th Senate district alongside Dr. Hector Galloway of Oronoco, Minnesota.^{:37,47}^{:60} Hodges won the election on October 13, 1857 and would serve in the 1st Minnesota Legislature from December 2, 1857 to December 6, 1859. During his term in the Minnesota Senate Hodges was on the Federal Relations, Internal Improvements, and the Roads and Bridges Committees.

From 1860 to 1861 Hodges served as the town superintendent of Eyota, Minnesota. In 1861 Hodges was appointed as a delegate of the Olmsted County Agricultural Society.^{:54}

In 1859 Hodges campaigned for a second term and won the October 11, 1859 election for his previous position in the Minnesota Senate.^{:62} Hodges would serve in the 2nd Minnesota Legislature from December 7, 1859 to January 7, 1861. During his second term Hodges was the chair of the Ways and Means Committee and a member of the Elections Committee.

== Later life and death ==
Following his term in the Minnesota Senate, Hodges was appointed in 1864 to serve as a clerk in the United States Department of the Treasury in Washington, D.C.^{:372} Hodges would work for the Treasury for 22 years until his death.^{:372}

Hodges died on January 20, 1888 in Washington, D.C.^{:371}
