= Minnesota's 11th Senate district =

American legislative district

Minnesota's 11th State Senate district
Senator
Jason Rarick; R–Pine City
since 2019
- Population (2020): 85,220

The Minnesota Senate, District 11, includes portions of Carlton, Kanabec, Pine and St. Louis counties in the northeastern part of the state. It is currently held by Republican Jason Rarick who was elected in a special election in 2019.

== List of senators ==
Session	Image	Senator	Party	Term start	Term end	Home	Location
1st		Samuel S. Beman	Rep	December 2, 1857	December 6, 1859	Saratoga	Winona
1st		Daniel Sheldon Norton	Rep	December 2, 1857	December 6, 1859	Winona	Winona
2nd		Ephraim L. King	Non	December 7, 1859	January 7, 1861	Winona	Winona
2nd		J.M. Winn	Non	December 7, 1859	January 7, 1861	Richmond	Winona
3rd		Daniel Sheldon Norton	Rep	January 8, 1861	January 6, 1862	Winona	Winona
4th		M. Wheeler Sargeant	Rep	January 7, 1862	January 4, 1864	Winona	Winona
5th		M. Wheeler Sargeant	Rep	January 7, 1862	January 4, 1864	Winona	Winona
6th		Daniel Sheldon Norton	Rep	January 5, 1864	January 1, 1866	Winona	Winona
7th		Daniel Sheldon Norton	Rep	January 5, 1864	January 1, 1866	Winona	Winona
8th		Thomas Simpson	Non	January 2, 1866	January 7, 1867	Winona	Winona
9th		William Hall Yale	Rep	January 8, 1867	January 6, 1868	Winona	Winona
10th		Benjamin Franklin	Dem	January 7, 1868	1868?	Winona	Winona
11th		Samuel B. Sheardown	Rep	January 5, 1869	January 3, 1870	Stockton	Winona
12th		Cornelius F. Buck	Dem	January 4, 1870	January 1, 1872	Winona	Winona
13th		Cornelius F. Buck	Dem	January 4, 1870	January 1, 1872	Winona	Winona
14th		Joseph H. Clark	Rep	January 2, 1872	January 6, 1873	Claremont	Dodge
15th		H. H. Atherton	Rep	January 7, 1873	January 4, 1875	Kasson	Dodge
16th		H. H. Atherton	Rep	January 7, 1873	January 4, 1875	Kasson	Dodge
17th		Joseph H. Clark	Rep	January 5, 1875	January 1, 1877	Rice Lake	Dodge
18th		Joseph H. Clark	Rep	January 5, 1875	January 1, 1877	Rice Lake	Dodge
19th		Alonzo J. Edgerton	Rep	January 2, 1877	January 6, 1879	Mantorville	Dodge
20th		Alonzo J. Edgerton	Rep	January 2, 1877	January 6, 1879	Mantorville	Dodge
21st		John Gorham	Rep	January 7, 1879	January 3, 1881	Rice Lake	Dodge
22nd		James McLaughlin	Non	January 4, 1881	January 1, 1883	Mantorville	Dodge
23rd		Robert O. Craig	Dem	January 2, 1883	January 3, 1887	Janesville	Waseca
24th		Robert O. Craig	Dem	January 2, 1883	January 3, 1887	Janesville	Waseca
25th		William Ward	Rep	January 4, 1887	January 5, 1891	Waseca	Waseca
26th		William Ward	Rep	January 4, 1887	January 5, 1891	Waseca	Waseca
27th		Robert O. Craig	Dem	January 6, 1891	January 7, 1895	Janesville	Waseca
28th		Robert O. Craig	Dem	January 6, 1891	January 7, 1895	Janesville	Waseca
29th		Eugene Belnap Collester	Rep	January 8, 1895	January 2, 1899	Waseca	Waseca
30th		Eugene Belnap Collester	Rep	January 8, 1895	January 2, 1899	Waseca	Waseca
31st		Clifford L. Benedict	Rep	January 3, 1899	January 5, 1903	Mankato	Blue Earth
32nd		Clifford L. Benedict	Rep	January 3, 1899	January 5, 1903	Mankato	Blue Earth
33rd		Adolph Olson Eberhart	Rep	January 6, 1903	January 7, 1907	Mankato	Blue Earth
34th		Adolph Olson Eberhart	Rep	January 6, 1903	January 7, 1907	Mankato	Blue Earth
35th		Samuel Works	Dem	January 8, 1907	January 4, 1915	Mankato	Blue Earth
36th		Samuel Works	Dem	January 8, 1907	January 4, 1915	Mankato	Blue Earth
37th		Samuel Works	Dem	January 8, 1907	January 4, 1915	Mankato	Blue Earth
38th		Samuel Works	Dem	January 8, 1907	January 4, 1915	Mankato	Blue Earth
39th		Samuel B. Nelson	Lib	January 5, 1915	January 6, 1919	Luverne	Nobles Rock
40th		Samuel B. Nelson	Lib	January 5, 1915	January 6, 1919	Luverne	Nobles Rock
41st		John A. Cashel	Non	January 7, 1919	January 3, 1927	Worthington	Nobles Rock
42nd		John A. Cashel	Non	January 7, 1919	January 3, 1927	Worthington	Nobles Rock
43rd		John A. Cashel	Non	January 7, 1919	January 3, 1927	Worthington	Nobles Rock
44th		John A. Cashel	Non	January 7, 1919	January 3, 1927	Worthington	Nobles Rock
45th		Lauritz Lund	Non	January 4, 1927	January 5, 1931	Luverne	Nobles Rock
46th		Lauritz Lund	Non	January 4, 1927	January 5, 1931	Luverne	Nobles Rock
47th		Frank Sell	Con	January 6, 1931	January 4, 1943	Adrian	Nobles Rock
48th		Frank Sell	Con	January 6, 1931	January 4, 1943	Adrian	Nobles Rock
49th		Frank Sell	Con	January 6, 1931	January 4, 1943	Adrian	Nobles Rock
50th		Frank Sell	Con	January 6, 1931	January 4, 1943	Adrian	Nobles Rock
51st		Frank Sell	Con	January 6, 1931	January 4, 1943	Adrian	Nobles Rock
52nd		Frank Sell	Con	January 6, 1931	January 4, 1943	Adrian	Nobles Rock
53rd		John Engebretson	Non	January 5, 1943	January 6, 1947	Kenneth	Nobles Rock
54th		John Engebretson	Non	January 5, 1943	January 6, 1947	Kenneth	Nobles Rock
55th		Milford Wesley Davis	Non	January 7, 1947	January 1, 1951	Reading	Nobles Rock
56th		Milford Wesley Davis	Non	January 7, 1947	January 1, 1951	Reading	Nobles Rock
57th		Andy A. Anderson	Con	January 2, 1951	January 5, 1959	Luverne	Nobles Rock
58th		Andy A. Anderson	Con	January 2, 1951	January 5, 1959	Luverne	Nobles Rock
59th		Andy A. Anderson	Con	January 2, 1951	January 5, 1959	Luverne	Nobles Rock
60th		Andy A. Anderson	Con	January 2, 1951	January 5, 1959	Luverne	Nobles Rock
61st		John L. Olson	Con	January 6, 1959	January 7, 1963	Worthington	Nobles Rock
62nd		John L. Olson	Con	January 6, 1959	January 7, 1963	Worthington	Nobles Rock
63rd		Val Imm	Con	January 8, 1963	January 2, 1967	Mankato	Blue Earth
64th		Val Imm	Con	January 8, 1963	January 2, 1967	Mankato	Blue Earth
65th		Fred Kelton Gage, Jr.	Con	January 3, 1967	January 1, 1973	Mankato	Blue Earth
66th		Fred Kelton Gage, Jr.	Con	January 3, 1967	January 1, 1973	Mankato	Blue Earth
67th		Fred Kelton Gage, Jr.	Con	January 3, 1967	January 1, 1973	Mankato	Blue Earth
68th		Wayne Olhoft	DFL	January 2, 1973	January 3, 1983	Herman	Douglas Grant Otter Tail Traverse
69th		Wayne Olhoft	DFL	January 2, 1973	January 3, 1983	Herman	Douglas Grant Otter Tail Traverse
70th		Wayne Olhoft	DFL	January 2, 1973	January 3, 1983	Herman	Douglas Grant Otter Tail Traverse
71st		Wayne Olhoft	DFL	January 2, 1973	January 3, 1983	Herman	Douglas Grant Otter Tail Traverse
72nd		Wayne Olhoft	DFL	January 2, 1973	January 3, 1983	Herman	Douglas Grant Otter Tail Traverse
73rd		Charlie Berg	Ind Rep	January 4, 1983	January 4, 1993	Chokio	Big Stone Douglas Grant Stevens Swift Traverse
74th		Charlie Berg	Ind Rep	January 4, 1983	January 4, 1993	Chokio	Big Stone Douglas Grant Stevens Swift Traverse
75th		Charlie Berg	DFL	January 4, 1983	January 4, 1993	Chokio	Big Stone Douglas Grant Stevens Swift Traverse
76th		Charlie Berg	DFL	January 4, 1983	January 4, 1993	Chokio	Big Stone Douglas Grant Stevens Swift Traverse
77th		Charlie Berg	DFL	January 4, 1983	January 4, 1993	Chokio	Big Stone Douglas Grant Stevens Swift Traverse
78th		Dallas Sams	DFL	January 5, 1993	January 2, 2007	Staples	Becker Douglas Otter Tail Stearns Todd Wadena
79th		Dallas Sams	DFL	January 5, 1993	January 2, 2007	Staples	Becker Douglas Otter Tail Stearns Todd Wadena
80th		Dallas Sams	DFL	January 5, 1993	January 2, 2007	Staples	Becker Douglas Otter Tail Stearns Todd Wadena
81st		Dallas Sams	DFL	January 5, 1993	January 2, 2007	Staples	Becker Douglas Otter Tail Stearns Todd Wadena
82nd		Dallas Sams	DFL	January 5, 1993	January 2, 2007	Staples	Becker Douglas Otter Tail Stearns Todd Wadena
83rd		Dallas Sams	DFL	January 5, 1993	January 2, 2007	Staples	Douglas Grant Stevens Todd
84th		Dallas Sams	DFL	January 5, 1993	January 2, 2007	Staples	Douglas Grant Stevens Todd
85th		Bill G. Ingebrigtsen	Rep	January 3, 2007	January 7, 2013	Alexandria	Douglas Grant Stevens Todd
86th		Bill G. Ingebrigtsen	Rep	January 3, 2007	January 7, 2013	Alexandria	Douglas Grant Stevens Todd
87th		Bill G. Ingebrigtsen	Rep	January 3, 2007	January 7, 2013	Alexandria	Douglas Grant Stevens Todd
88th		Tony Lourey	DFL	January 8, 2013	January 3, 2019	Kerrick	Carlton Kanabec Pine St. Louis
89th		Tony Lourey	DFL	January 8, 2013	January 3, 2019	Kerrick	Carlton Kanabec Pine St. Louis
90th		Tony Lourey	DFL	January 8, 2013	January 3, 2019	Kerrick	Carlton Kanabec Pine St. Louis
91st		Vacant		January 8, 2019	February 13, 2019		Carlton Kanabec Pine St. Louis
91st		Jason Rarick	Republican	February 13, 2019	Incumbent	Pine City	Carlton Kanabec Pine St. Louis
92nd		Jason Rarick	Republican	February 13, 2019	Incumbent	Pine City	Carlton Kanabec Pine St. Louis
93rd		Jason Rarick	Republican	February 13, 2019	Incumbent	Pine City	Carlton Kanabec Pine St. Louis
94th		Jason Rarick	Republican	February 13, 2019	Incumbent	Pine City	Carlton Kanabec Pine St. Louis
