= Charles H. Lindsley =

American politician (1841–1923)

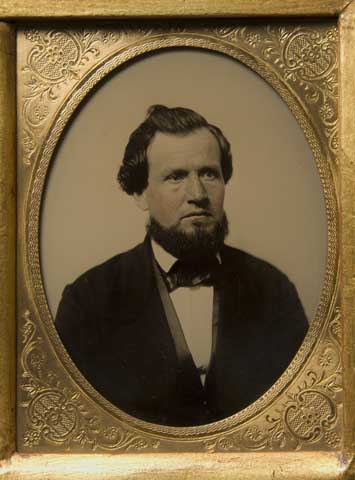
- Lindsley c. 1858

3rd Ward Municipal Mayor of Rochester, Minnesota
- In office 1858–1860

Member of the Minnesota Senate from the 8th District
- In office December 2, 1857 – December 6, 1859 Serving with Emerson Hodges
- Preceded by: Position established
- Succeeded by: Michael Cook

Personal details
- Born: April 14, 1841 New York, U.S.
- Died: June 6, 1923 (aged 82) Chico, California, U.S.
- Other political affiliations: Republican

Charles Hammond Lindsley (April 14, 1841 – June 6, 1923), sometimes written as C.H. Lindsley, was an American businessman, soldier, politician, and early citizen of Rochester, Minnesota who served a single term in the Minnesota Senate and later served as the mayor of Rochester.

== Early life ==
Lindsley was born on April 14, 1841, in Madison County, New York.^{:13} In 1844 Lindsley's family moved to Wisconsin.^{:13} Lindsley later moved to Minnesota Territory in 1855 and settled in Rochester in Olmsted County, Minnesota.^{:37} While in Rochester Lindsley assisted in the construction of Olmsted County's first courthouse.

== Politics ==
Lindsley first ran for political office in 1857 when he was elected to the Minnesota Senate on October 13, 1857, representing Minnesota's 8th Senate district alongside Emerson Hodges, also of Olmsted County.^{:37} During his term in the 1st Minnesota Legislature Lindsley was a member of the Banks Committee and the Public Lands Committee.^{:37} Lindsley was a Republican.

In 1858 Lindsley was a member of the city of Rochester's board of supervisors.^{:43} Lindsley served as the municipal mayor of Lowertown, a neighborhood of Rochester, Minnesota's 3rd Ward from 1858 to 1860. Lindsley ran for a seat in the United States Congress in 1859, however, he was defeated by William Windom of Winona, Minnesota.

== Military service ==
During the American Civil War Lindsley enlisted into the Union Army on January 28, 1865, and was enrolled into the ranks of Company F of the 1st Minnesota Heavy Artillery Regiment as a Private.

== Death ==
Lindsley died on June 6, 1923, in Chico, California.
