= History Center of Olmsted County =

Museum in Rochester, Minnesota

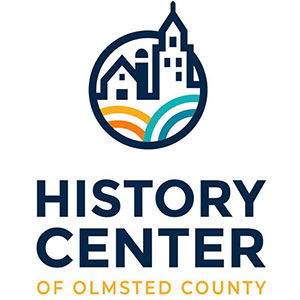

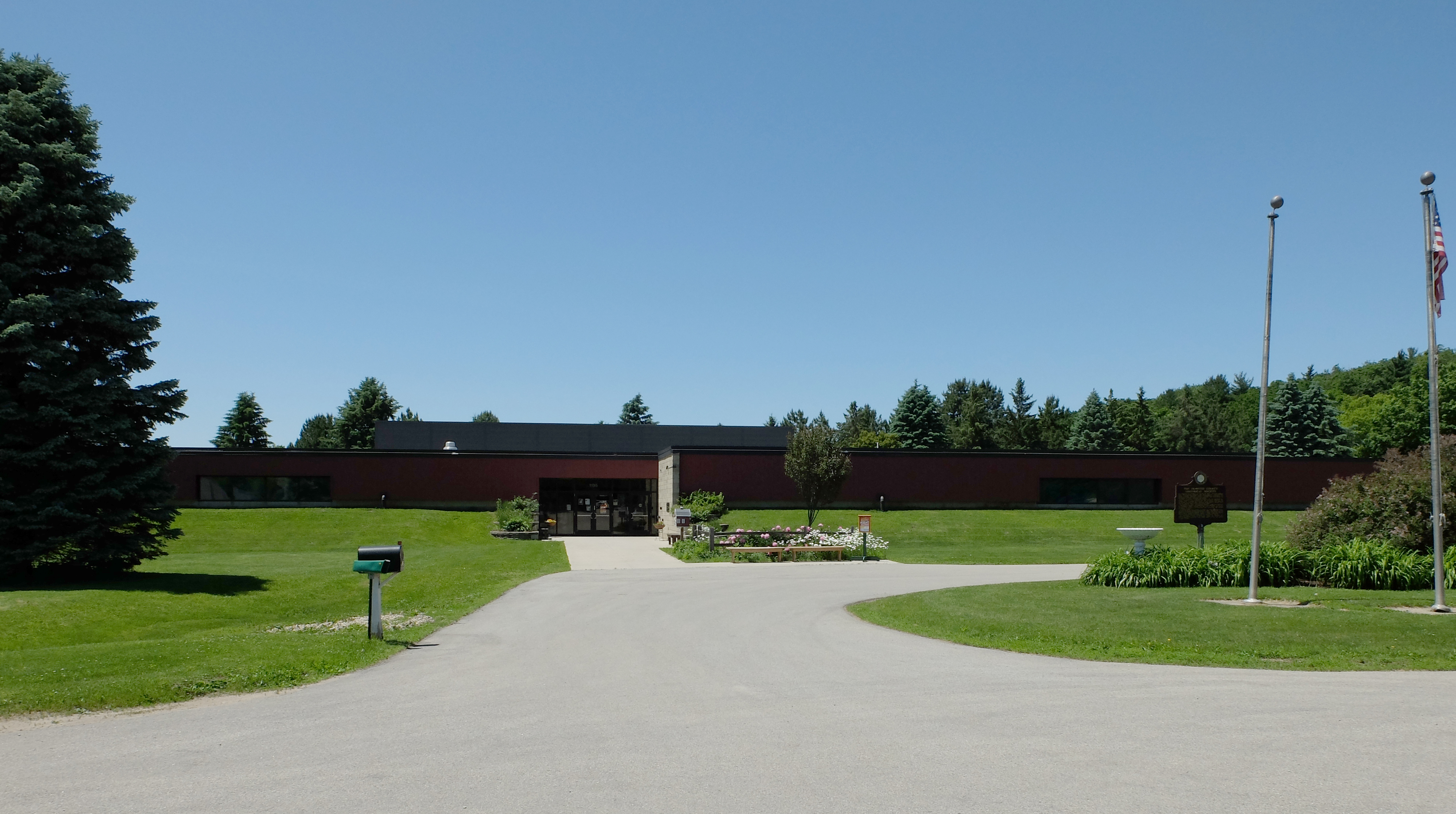
- Exterior of the museum
- Established: 1926
- Location: 1195 W Circle Dr, Rochester, Minnesota, US
- Coordinates: 44°0′23″N 92°30′36″W
- Type: Local history
- Executive director: Valerie Wassmer
- Website: olmstedhistory.com

The History Center of Olmsted County (HCOC) is a non-profit organization located in Rochester, Minnesota, dedicated to collecting, preserving, and interpreting the history of Olmsted County. Founded in 1926 as the Olmsted County Historical Society.

== Exhibits and Programs ==
The HCOC operates a museum with permanent and temporary exhibits that explore the rich history of Olmsted County, from the lives of its earliest inhabitants to the rise of Rochester as a global healthcare center.

Beyond the museum walls, the HCOC offers a range of educational programs for all ages. School tours explore various historical themes, while lecture series delve deeper into specific topics. Family-friendly events and workshops provide opportunities for hands-on learning and engagement with history.

=== Creepy Doll Contest ===
The History Center of Olmsted County (HCOC) curates a unique annual event called the "Creepy Doll Contest." Launched in 2019, the contest taps into the public's fascination with the unsettling. Staff delve into the HCOC's collection of over 100 antique dolls, selecting particularly eerie specimens. These dolls are then showcased on social media, with the public voting for the creepiest one. The contest has garnered national attention.

== Research ==
The HCOC houses a comprehensive research library and archives, containing over 600,000 items related to Olmsted County and southeastern Minnesota. These resources include maps, photographs, diaries, journals, books, and archival materials. These resources are available for researchers and genealogists. HCOC staff provides research assistance and offers educational programs on genealogical research methods.

== Historic Sites ==
In addition to the museum and archives, the HCOC operates and maintains several Olmsted County historic sites:

=== William Dee Log Cabin ===
Constructed in 1862 by Irish immigrant William Dee and neighbors, the cabin faced destruction in 1911. Saved by the Rochester DAR, it was donated to Mayo Park in honor of W.W. Mayo. After again falling into disrepair, it was moved to the Olmsted County Historical Society in 1961 and was reconstructed in 1986.

=== Hadley Valley School House ===
The Hadley Valley Schoolhouse, built in 1885 in Haverhill township near Rochester, accommodated both boys and girls until 1957. A new brick building was constructed to accommodate more students. The schoolteacher taught grades 1–8 to around 35 students, covering subjects like arithmetic, history, spelling, and geography. Electricity and an indoor bathroom were added in the 1930s. The schoolhouse was relocated to the fairgrounds in 1961 and then to the History Center in 1975, where it has been preserved.

=== George Stoppel Farm ===
The George Stoppel Farmstead, acquired by the Olmsted County Historical Society in 1972, now stands as a registered national historic site, remembering the early pioneers and agricultural history of Southeast Minnesota.

=== Mayowood Historic Home ===
The seasonal tours of Mayowood offer a look into the lives of the Mayo family, founders of the Mayo Clinic. Built in 1910 by Dr. Charlie and Edith Mayo, this 23,000-square foot home in southeast Minnesota is a concrete construction marvel. Once a 3,300-acre estate, it now showcases original Mayo family artifacts reflecting their global travels and role as hosts to the community and VIP guests. Surrounded by a terrace overlooking the Zumbro River, botanical gardens, and an Oriental Tea House, the property is owned by Mayo Clinic and operated by the History Center of Olmsted County.

== Community engagement ==
The HCOC actively engages with the community through various programs and events. They participate in Museums for All, offering free admission to those receiving food assistance. Additionally, they host lectures, author talks, family-friendly events, and historical reenactments.

The History Center of Olmsted County serves as a vital resource for anyone interested in learning more about the rich history of Olmsted County. Through its collections, exhibits, and programs, the HCOC helps connect the past to the present, fostering a deeper understanding of the community's identity.

== History of organization ==
=== Early Beginnings (1926-1972) ===
The organization was established in 1926 as the Olmsted County Historical Society. Their mission was to collect and safeguard historical artifacts, documents, and stories of Olmsted County. The fledgling organization initially operated out of the Rochester Public Library basement, opening its first museum space in 1940.

In 1959, the HCOC acquired the Bethel English Lutheran Church building, offering a dedicated museum space. However, this location soon proved inadequate for the growing collection. Recognizing the need for a permanent home, the HCOC purchased land in southwest Rochester in 1972 and constructed a new museum building.

=== Expansion and Growth (1972-Present) ===
The new museum facility, established in 1972, provided the HCOC with the space necessary to expand its collections, exhibits, and educational programs. Over the years, the HCOC has continued to acquire and manage additional historical sites, including the William Dee Log Cabin (1862), Hadley Valley School House (one-room schoolhouse), and the George Stoppel Farmstead.

In 2006, the Olmsted County Historical Society officially adopted the name History Center of Olmsted County to better reflect its broader mission. The HCOC remains a non-profit organization governed by a board of directors and supported by volunteers.

== See also ==
- List of museums in Minnesota
