= Samuel S. Beman =

American lawyer and politician

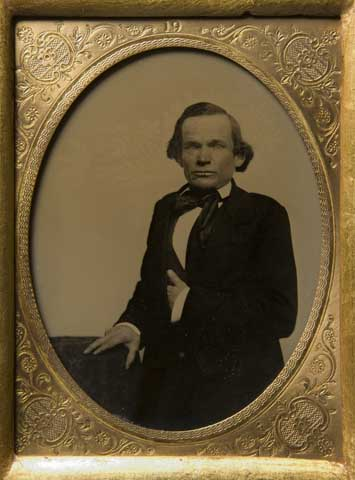
- Beman c. 1858

Member of the Minnesota Senate from the 11th District
- In office December 2, 1857 – December 6, 1859
- Governor: Samuel Medary

Member of the Minnesota Senate from the 7th District
- In office January 2, 1872 – January 4, 1875

Personal details
- Born: March 11, 1822 Mount Zion, Georgia, U.S.
- Died: May 9, 1882 (aged 60) St. Charles, Minnesota, U.S.
- Relations: Nathan S. S. Beman (father); William L. Yancey (half-brother)

Samuel Smith Beman (March 11, 1822 – May 9, 1882) was an American lawyer and politician.

Beman was born in Mount Zion, Hancock County, in the U.S. state of Georgia. His father was Nathan S. S. Beman and his half-brother was William Lowndes Yancey. He was admitted to the Alabama and New York bars. Beman served in the New York State Assembly, in 1853, from Washington County, New York, and was a member of the Whig Party. In 1855, Beman moved to Saratoga, Winona County, Minnesota with his wife and family and continued to practice law. Beman served in the Minnesota Senate, as a Republican in 1857 and 1858, then from 1872 to 1874, and finally from 1881 to his death in 1882. Beman died in St. Charles, Minnesota.

New York State Assembly
| Preceded by Elisha Billings | New York State Assembly; Washington County, 2nd District; 1853 | Succeeded by Ebenezer McMurray |
