= Kerrick, Minnesota =

City in Minnesota, United States

Kerrick
- City
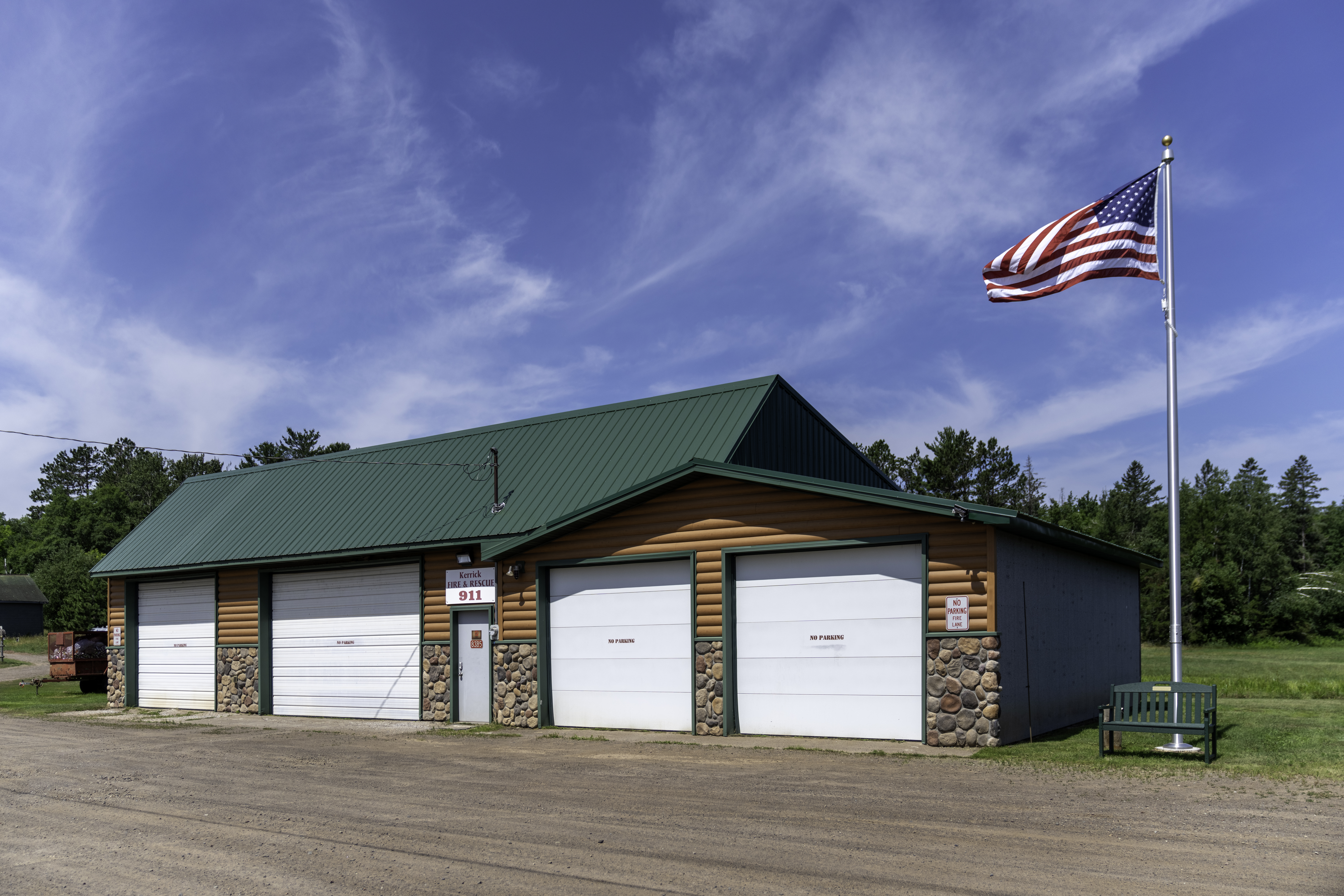
- Fire station in Kerrick

- Location of the city of Kerrick within Pine County, Minnesota
- Coordinates: 46°20′18″N 92°35′04″W
- Country: United States
- State: Minnesota
- County: Pine
- Incorporated: October 22, 1946

Government
  - Mayor: Dan Adams

Area
  - Total: 1.00 sq mi (2.58 km^{2})
  - Land: 1.00 sq mi (2.58 km^{2})
  - Water: 0.0039 sq mi (0.01 km^{2})
- Elevation: 1,165 ft (355 m)

Population (2020)
  - Total: 71
  - Density: 71.4/sq mi (27.55/km^{2})
  - Demonym: Kerrickese
- Time zone: UTC-6 (Central (CST))
  - Summer (DST): UTC-5 (CDT)
- ZIP code: 55756
- Area code: 218
- FIPS code: 27-32912
- GNIS feature ID: 2395520

Kerrick (/ˈkɛrɪk/ KERR-ik) is a city in Pine County, Minnesota, United States. As of the 2020 census, Kerrick had a population of 71.

Minnesota State Highway 23 serves as a main route in the community.

== Geography ==
According to the United States Census Bureau, the city has a total area of 1.00 square mile (2.59 km^{2}), all land.

The communities of Nickerson, Duquette, Bruno, Askov, Sandstone, and Sturgeon Lake are all near Kerrick.

== History ==
The city was named in honor of Cassius M. Kerrick, a master mechanic and conductor for the Great Northern Railway. However, originally the name "Kerrick" was applied to the neighboring Duquette. When the Great Northern Railway depot was moved three miles south, keeping that name, for a period Duquette was called Old Kerrick, the new site being called New Kerrick; the names were corrected when the Duquette post office was established in 1905.

== Demographics ==
Historical population
Census	Pop.	Note	%±
1950	81		—
1960	110		35.8%
1970	114		3.6%
1980	79		−30.7%
1990	56		−29.1%
2000	71		26.8%
2010	65		−8.5%
2020	71		9.2%
U.S. Decennial Census

=== 2010 census ===
As of the census of 2010, there were 65 people, 29 households, and 17 families living in the city. The population density was 65.0 inhabitants per square mile (25.1/km^{2}). There were 32 housing units at an average density of 32.0 per square mile (12.4/km^{2}). The racial makeup of the city was 95.4% White, 3.1% Native American, and 1.5% from two or more races.

There were 29 households, of which 31.0% had children under the age of 18 living with them, 41.4% were married couples living together, 3.4% had a female householder with no husband present, 13.8% had a male householder with no wife present, and 41.4% were non-families. 41.4% of all households were made up of individuals, and 17.2% had someone living alone who was 65 years of age or older. The average household size was 2.24 and the average family size was 2.88.

The median age in the city was 38.5 years. 24.6% of residents were under the age of 18; 4.6% were between the ages of 18 and 24; 23% were from 25 to 44; 33.9% were from 45 to 64; and 13.8% were 65 years of age or older. The gender makeup of the city was 53.8% male and 46.2% female.

=== 2000 census ===
As of the census of 2000, there were 71 people, 28 households, and 19 families living in the city. The population density was 71.0 inhabitants per square mile (27.4/km^{2}). There were 34 housing units at an average density of 34.0 per square mile (13.1/km^{2}). The racial makeup of the city was 98.59% White, and 1.41% from two or more races.

There were 28 households, out of which 28.6% had children under the age of 18 living with them, 42.9% were married couples living together, 17.9% had a female householder with no husband present, and 28.6% were non-families. 28.6% of all households were made up of individuals, and 10.7% had someone living alone who was 65 years of age or older. The average household size was 2.54 and the average family size was 3.00.

In the city, the population was spread out, with 19.7% under the age of 18, 11.3% from 18 to 24, 32.4% from 25 to 44, 18.3% from 45 to 64, and 18.3% who were 65 years of age or older. The median age was 40 years. For every 100 females, there were 129.0 males. For every 100 females age 18 and over, there were 128.0 males.

The median income for a household in the city was $38,750, and the median income for a family was $38,750. Males had a median income of $37,250 versus $11,250 for females. The per capita income for the city was $14,324. There were no families and 2.7% of the population living below the poverty line, including no under eighteens and none of those over 64.

== Education ==
The local school district is East Central Schools.

== Notable people ==
- Becky Lourey - former senator
- Tony Lourey - former senator
