= John Clark (Minnesota politician) =

American politician

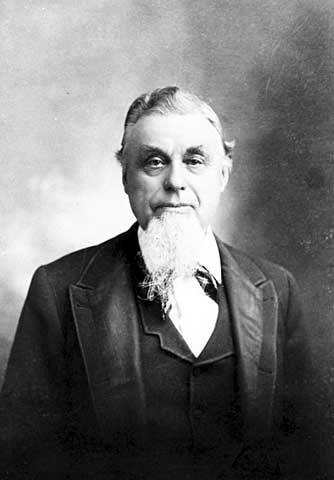

Member of the Minnesota Senate from the 8th district
- In office 1887–1890
- Preceded by: George Knudson
- Succeeded by: Eric Sevatson

Personal details
- Born: 1825 Unity, New Hampshire, U.S.
- Died: 1904 (aged 78–79)
- Party: Republican
- Profession: Realtor, Legislator

John Clark (c. 1825–1904) was a State Senator from Windom, Minnesota. He served in the Minnesota State Senate from 1887 to 1890 in the 8th district serving Watonwan and Cottonwood counties. He was preceded in his position by George Knudson and succeeded by Eric Sevatson. He also served in the Massachusetts General Court in 1864. He was born in Unity, New Hampshire in 1825. (Note: Some sources list his birth year as 1826; however, Minnesota Biographies and the 1889 legislative manual list his birth year as 1825.) He received an elementary education. In addition to his work in the state legislature, he served on the Cottonwood County Board of Commissioners and as President of the Village Board in Windom. He died in 1904.
