= Bill Ingebrigtsen =

American politician

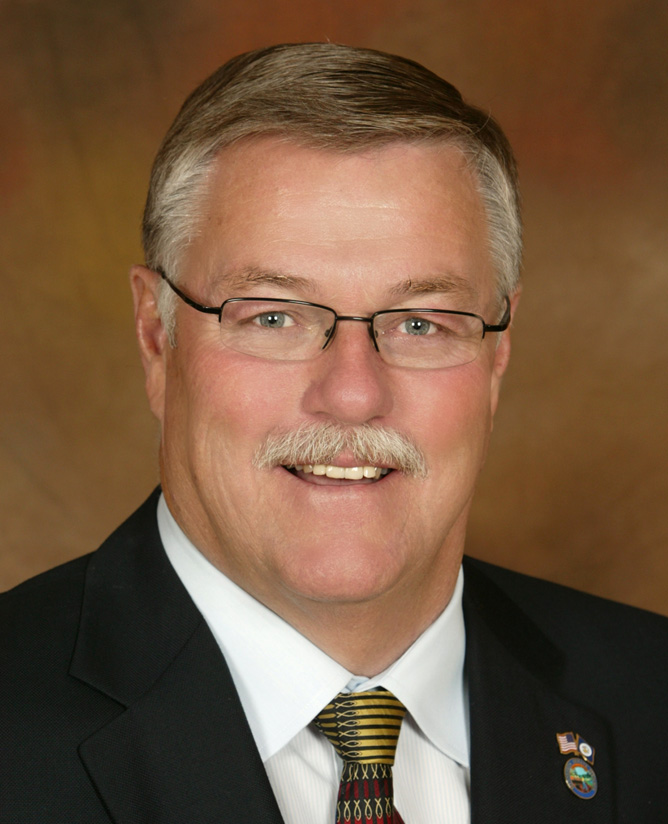

Member of the Minnesota Senate
- In office January 3, 2007 – January 3, 2023
- Preceded by: Tony Lourey (8th), Dallas Sams (11th)
- Succeeded by: Jen McEwen (8th)
- Constituency: 8th district (2013–2023); 11th district (2007–2013)

Personal details
- Born: March 26, 1952 (age 74) Karlstad, Minnesota, U.S.
- Party: Republican
- Spouse: Marilyn Ingebrigtsen
- Children: Jason; Linnea
- Education: Alexandria Technical and Community College

Bill G. Ingebrigtsen (/ˈɪŋɡəbrɪtsɪn/ ING-gə-brit-sin; born March 26, 1952) is a Minnesota politician and former member of the Minnesota Senate. A member of the Republican Party of Minnesota, he represented District 8, which includes parts of Douglas and Otter Tail counties in the west central part of the state.

== Early life, education, and career ==
Ingebrigtsen was born in Karlstad, Minnesota, in 1952. He graduated from Hallock High School, obtained an A.A. in law enforcement from Alexandria Technical College, and attended the National Sheriffs Institute of Business Management. He was a Douglas County deputy sheriff from 1972 to 1991. He ran for and was elected sheriff in 1990. He was reelected in 1994, 1998, and 2002, serving in that position from 1991 to 2007.

== Minnesota Senate ==
Ingebrigtsen was first elected in 2006 and reelected in 2010, 2012, 2016, and 2020. In 2008, he was appointed to the Minnesota Lessard Outdoor Heritage Council by then-Senate Majority Leader Larry Pogemiller. He did not run for reelection in 2022.

== Electoral history ==
- Minnesota Senate 8th district election, 2012
  - Bill Ingebrigtsen (R), 22,693 votes (52.86%)
  - Dan Skogen (DFL), 20,197 votes (47.04%)
  - Write-in, 42 votes (0.10%)
- Minnesota Senate 11th district election, 2010
  - Bill Ingebrigtsen (R), 20,798 votes (64.98%)
  - Jim Thoreen (DFL), 11,171 votes (34.90%)
  - Write-in, 37 votes (0.12%)
- Minnesota Senate 11th district election, 2006
  - Bill Ingebrigtsen (R), 17,699 votes (51.30%)
  - Dallas Sams (DFL), 16,765 votes (48.59%)
  - Write-in, 38 votes (0.11%)

Minnesota Senate
| Preceded by Dallas Sams | Member of the Minnesota Senate from the 8th district 2007–present | Incumbent |
