= Dallas Sams =

American politician

Member of the Minnesota Senate from the 12th (1991-1993) 11th (1993-2007) district
- In office January 8, 1991 – January 2, 2007
- Preceded by: Charlie Berg (11th), Don Anderson (12th)
- Succeeded by: Bill Ingebrigtsen (11th), Don Samuelson (12th)

Personal details
- Born: Dallas C. Sams; August 30, 1952
- Died: March 5, 2007 (aged 54) Saint Paul, Minnesota, U.S.
- Party: Democratic-Farmer-Labor
- Education: University of Minnesota

Dallas C. Sams (August 30, 1952 – March 5, 2007) was an American politician and farmer.

From Staples, Minnesota, Sams graduated from University of Minnesota with a degree in agriculture education. He was a farmer and farm business management instructor. From 1991 to 2006, he served in the Minnesota State Senate as a member of the Minnesota Democratic-Farmer-Labor Party. He died in St. Paul, Minnesota from brain cancer.
