= H. H. Atherton =

Minnesota state senator (1833–1904)

Member of the Minnesota Senate from the 11th district
- In office January 7, 1873 – January 4, 1875
- Preceded by: Joseph H. Clark
- Succeeded by: Joseph H. Clark

Personal details
- Born: Henry Hurlburt Atherton; December 15, 1833 Middlesex, Vermont, U.S.
- Died: June 25, 1904 (aged 70) Geneva, Nebraska, U.S.
- Party: Republican
- Spouse: Jane Wilson (m. 1856)
- Children: 1
- Occupation: Merchant

Henry Hurlburt Atherton (December 15, 1833 – June 25, 1904) was an American merchant and politician who represented the 11th district of the Minnesota Senate, which consisted of Dodge County, from 1873 until 1874. He was also among the early settlers of the town of Elgin, Minnesota.

== Early life ==
Henry Hurlburt Atherton was born on December 15, 1833, in Middlesex, Vermont. He moved to Wisconsin in 1853 before relocating to Minnesota in either 1854 or 1855. He was one of the first settlers of Elgin, Minnesota, along with Curtis Bryant, George Bryant, and George Farrar. The men, all from Vermont, arrived by steamboat at Winona, Minnesota. They crossed Winona County before arriving in the vicinity of Elgin in April 1855.

He relocated to Eyota, Minnesota, in 1859. He served as the postmaster of the town during his time there.

== Career ==
Atherton began in the mercantile business upon his relocation to Kasson, Minnesota. He was elected to the Minnesota Senate as a representative of Dodge County and served as senator in 1873 and 1874 as a member of the Republican Party. His obituary notes him as having a personal relationship with Governor Cushman K. Davis.

== Later life and death ==
Due to Atherton's ailing health, he and his wife moved to Fairmont, Nebraska, in 1876. There, Atherton engaged in the drug, jewelry, grocery, and shoe businesses. In 1884, Atherton relocated to Independence, Kansas, before moving to Fort Smith, Arkansas, two years later. He returned to Nebraska sometime later before settling in Yuma, Arizona, for ten years. He moved to Geneva, Nebraska, in 1896.

Atherton died at his home in Geneva on June 25, 1904.

== Personal life ==
Atherton married Jane Wilson on September 23, 1856. Together, they had a son. He was a Freemason.

Preceded by Joseph H. Clark	Member of the Minnesota Senate from the 11th district January 7, 1873 – January 4, 1875	Succeeded by Joseph H. Clark
