= Ralph L. Mayhood =

American businessman and politician

Ralph L. Mayhood (November 22, 1909 – January 18, 1978) was an American businessman and politician.

Mayhood was born on a farm near Eyota, Minnesota. He graduated from Rochester High School in Rochester, Minnesota. He went to University of Minnesota, Minnesota College of Law (now William Mitchell College of Law), and Northwestern University. Mayhood lived in Minneapolis, Minnesota. He served in the Minnesota House of Representatives in 1941 and 1942 and in the Minnesota Senate from 1943 to 1958. He served as the Hennepin County Sheriff and was the administrator of the Samaritan Nursing Home in Minneapolis and had owned nursing homes. Mayhood was beaten to death in an apartment he owned in Minneapolis. Two men and an unnamed woman were charged in his death. In April 1978, Charles Desjarlais, who was facing charges for third degree murder, pleaded guilty to first degree manslaughter and was sentenced to up to 15 years in prison. In June 1978, Wilmer Martin was found guilty of third degree murder and sentenced to up to 25 years in prison. His conviction was overturned on appeal in 1980. In 1981, Martin was sentenced to 4.5 years in prison after pleading guilty to second degree assault for attacking a man with a knife.
