= Donald T. Franke =

American politician and lawyer (1921–2013)

- Born: August 16, 1921; Eyota, Minnesota, U.S.
- Died: September 25, 2013 (aged 92); Naples, Florida, U.S.

Donald T. Franke (August 16, 1921 – September 25, 2013) was an American politician, lawyer, and jurist.

Born in Eyota, Minnesota, Franke served in the United States Army Air Forces as a pilot during World War II. He received his associate degree from Rochester Community College, a bachelor's degree in journalism, and a law degree from the University of Minnesota. Franke taught journalism at Central Washington University. He then practiced law in Rochester, Minnesota. From 1957 to 1963, Franke served in the Minnesota House of Representatives. From 1964 until 1975, he served as a Minnesota District Court judge. In 1975, Franke and his wife moved to Naples, Florida where he continued practicing law. Franke died in Naples, Florida.
