= Dover, Minnesota =

City in Minnesota, United States

Dover
- City
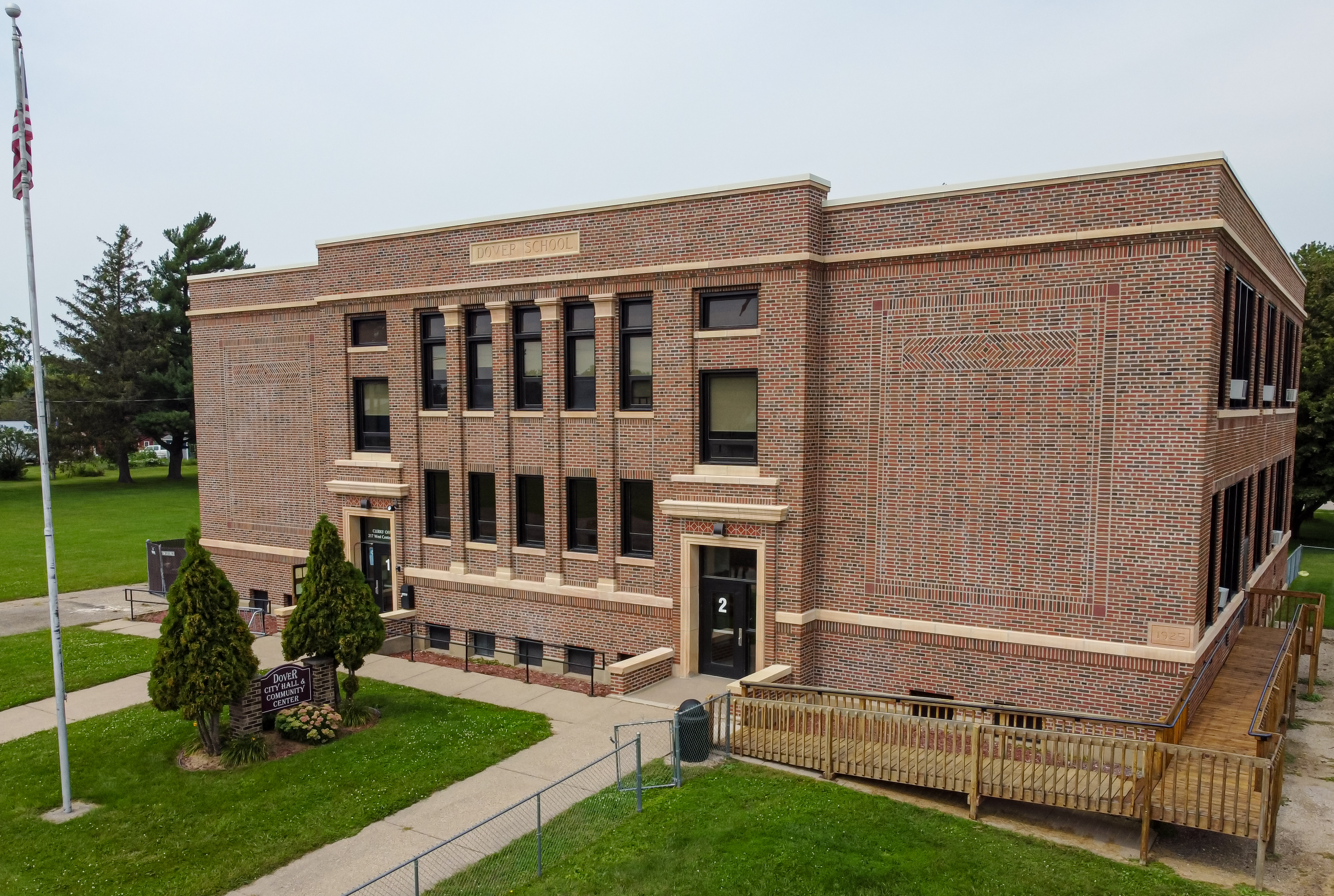
- City hall

- Location of Dover, Minnesota
- Coordinates: 43°58′10″N 92°07′45″W
- Country: United States
- State: Minnesota
- County: Olmsted

Area
  - Total: 1.00 sq mi (2.60 km^{2})
  - Land: 1.00 sq mi (2.60 km^{2})
  - Water: 0 sq mi (0.00 km^{2})
- Elevation: 1,184 ft (361 m)

Population (2020)
  - Total: 782
  - Density: 778.6/sq mi (300.61/km^{2})
- Time zone: UTC-6 (Central (CST))
  - Summer (DST): UTC-5 (CDT)
- ZIP code: 55929
- Area code: 507
- FIPS code: 27-16264
- GNIS feature ID: 2394555
- Website: https://www.dovermn.org/

Dover is a city in Olmsted County, Minnesota, United States. As of the 2020 census, Dover had a population of 782.

== History ==
An early name of Dover was Dover Center, so named from its location near the geographical center of Dover Township. Dover was platted in 1869.

== Geography ==
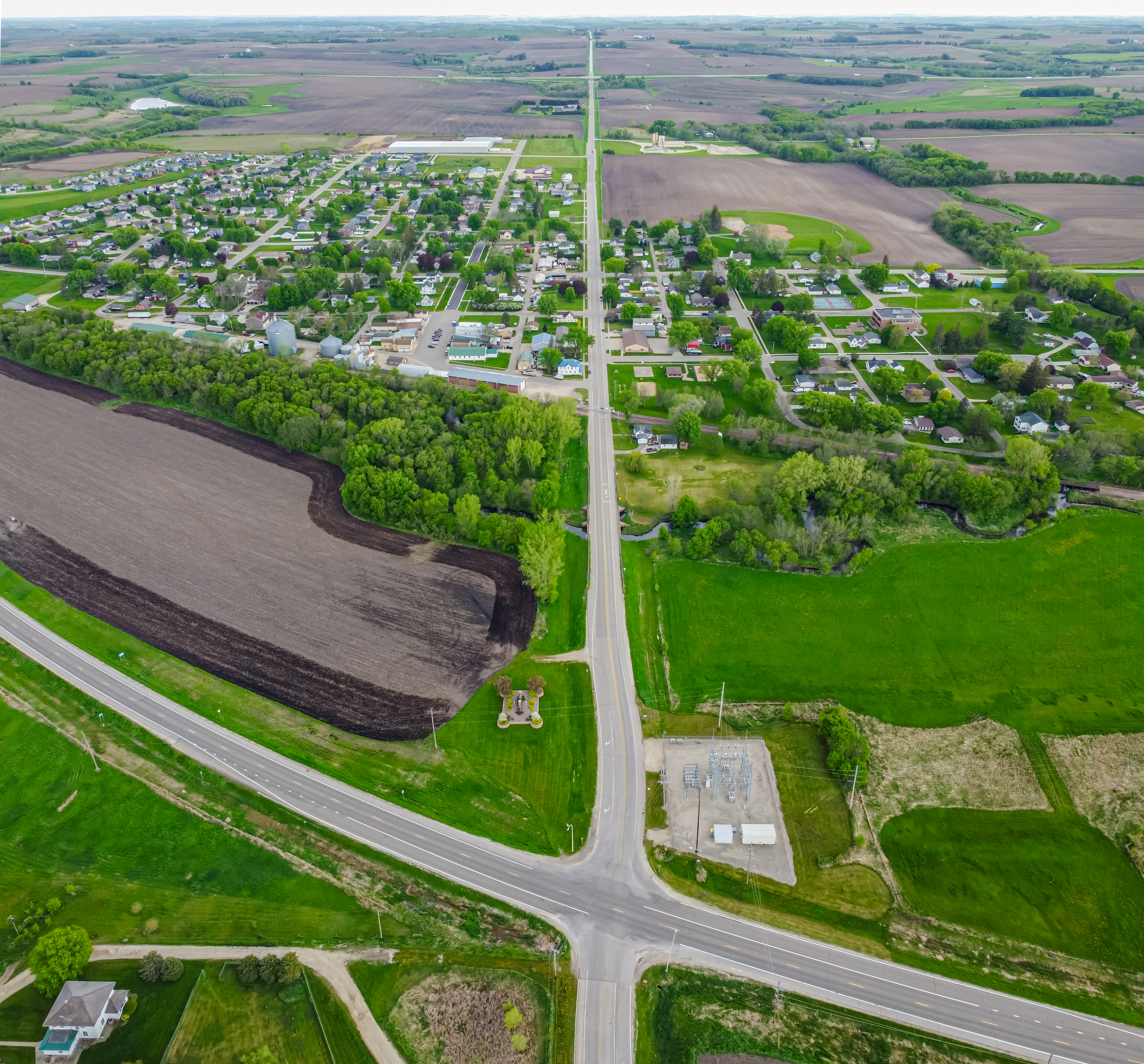

According to the United States Census Bureau, the city has a total area of 1.00 square mile (2.59 km^{2}), all land.

The south branch of the Whitewater River passes through the northern edge of the city.

U.S. Route 14 is the main route serving the community. Interstate 90 is immediately south of the city.

== Demographics ==
Historical population
Census	Pop.	Note	%±
1880	231		—
1910	233		—
1920	266		14.2%
1930	272		2.3%
1940	269		−1.1%
1950	263		−2.2%
1960	312		18.6%
1970	321		2.9%
1980	312		−2.8%
1990	416		33.3%
2000	438		5.3%
2010	735		67.8%
2020	782		6.4%
U.S. Decennial Census

=== 2010 census ===
As of the census of 2010, there were 735 people, 261 households, and 200 families living in the city. The population density was 735.0 inhabitants per square mile (283.8/km^{2}). There were 282 housing units at an average density of 282.0 per square mile (108.9/km^{2}). The racial makeup of the city was 95.6% White, 0.4% Asian, 3.0% from other races, and 1.0% from two or more races. Hispanic or Latino of any race were 4.2% of the population.

There were 261 households, of which 49.8% had children under the age of 18 living with them, 63.6% were married couples living together, 8.0% had a female householder with no husband present, 5.0% had a male householder with no wife present, and 23.4% were non-families. 20.7% of all households were made up of individuals, and 3.8% had someone living alone who was 65 years of age or older. The average household size was 2.82 and the average family size was 3.23.

The median age in the city was 29.7 years. 34% of residents were under the age of 18; 5.3% were between the ages of 18 and 24; 37.1% were from 25 to 44; 19% were from 45 to 64; and 4.6% were 65 years of age or older. The gender makeup of the city was 48.8% male and 51.2% female.

=== 2000 census ===
As of the census of 2000, there were 438 people, 171 households, and 117 families living in the city. The population density was 410.4 inhabitants per square mile (158.5/km^{2}). There were 174 housing units at an average density of 163.1 per square mile (63.0/km^{2}). The racial makeup of the city was 97.72% White, 1.60% from other races, and 0.68% from two or more races. Hispanic or Latino of any race were 2.51% of the population.

There were 171 households, out of which 42.1% had children under the age of 18 living with them, 51.5% were married couples living together, 11.1% had a female householder with no husband present, and 31.0% were non-families. 25.1% of all households were made up of individuals, and 8.8% had someone living alone who was 65 years of age or older. The average household size was 2.56 and the average family size was 3.00.

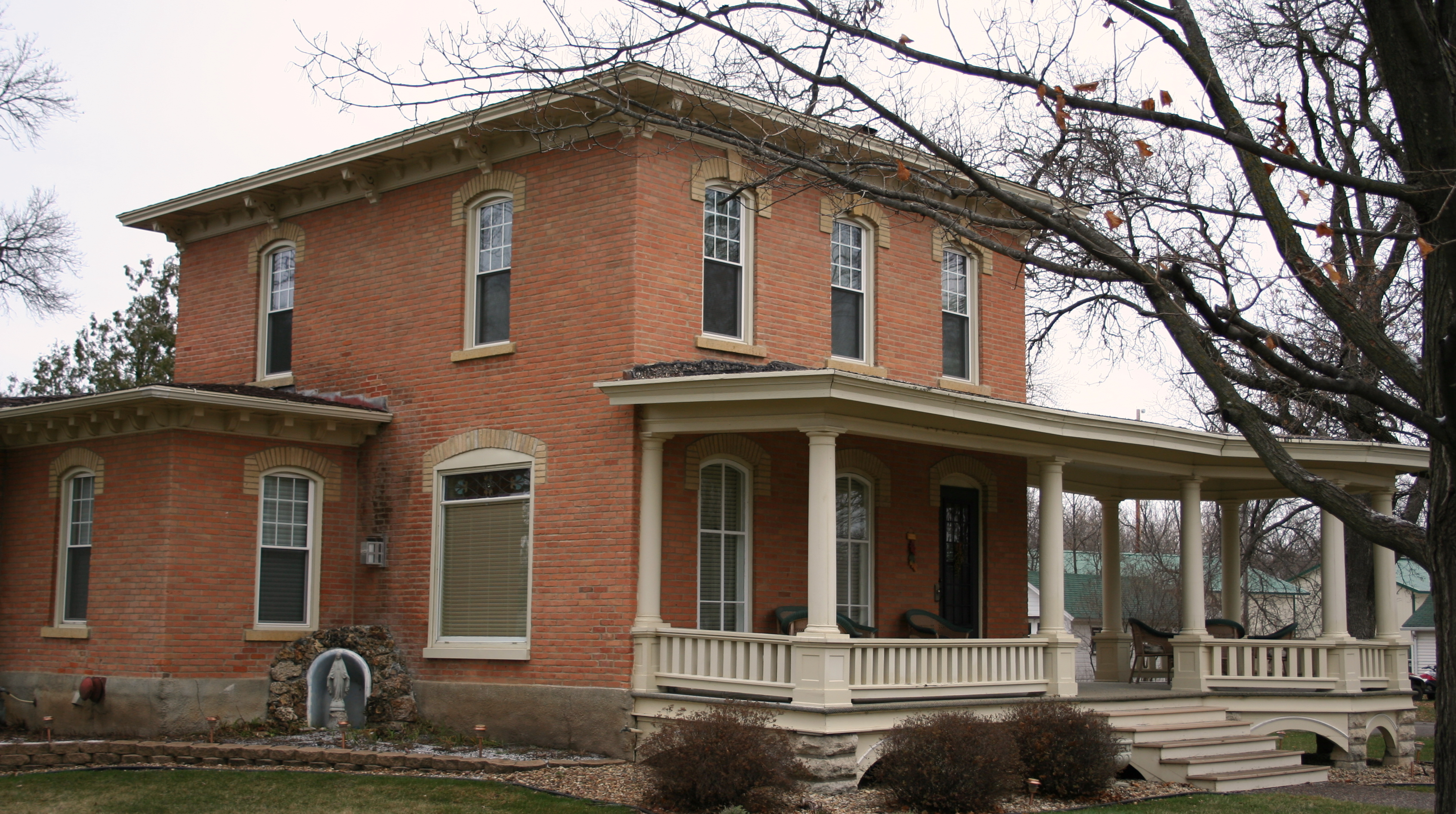
The Bush House, on the National Register of Historic Places, in Dover.

In the city, the population was spread out, with 31.1% under the age of 18, 7.1% from 18 to 24, 33.6% from 25 to 44, 18.7% from 45 to 64, and 9.6% who were 65 years of age or older. The median age was 33 years. For every 100 females, there were 101.8 males. For every 100 females age 18 and over, there were 97.4 males.

The median income for a household in the city was $41,250, and the median income for a family was $47,188. Males had a median income of $29,792 versus $22,857 for females. The per capita income for the city was $15,804. None of the families and 3.0% of the population were living below the poverty line, including no under eighteens and 4.7% of those over 64.

== School District ==
Dover is part of the Dover-Eyota School District.

== See also ==
- Dover Township
