= Dover Township, Olmsted County, Minnesota =

Dover Township, Minnesota
- Township
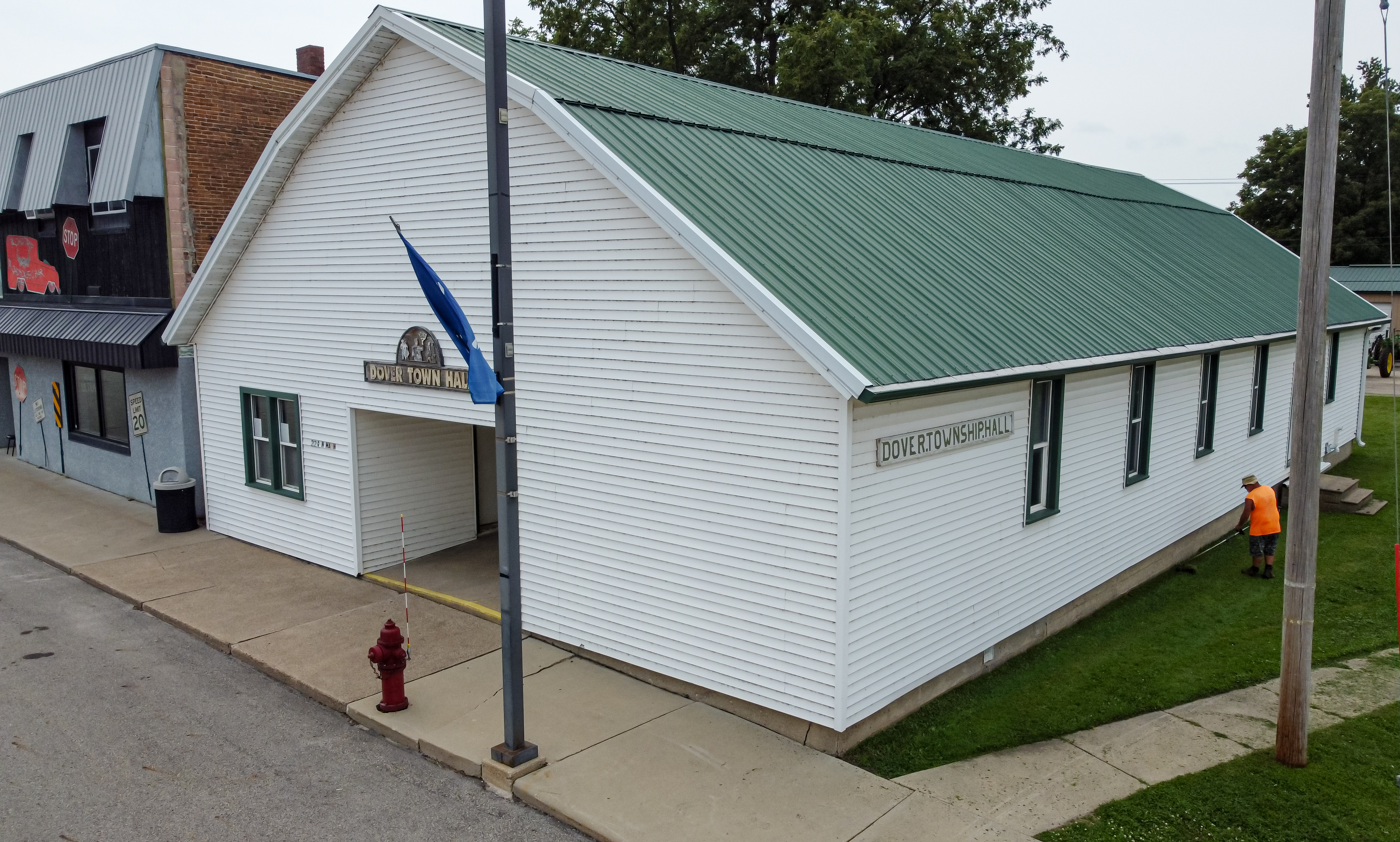
- Town hall

- Location within the state of Minnesota Dover Township, Minnesota (the United States)
- Coordinates: 43°58′39″N 92°8′12″W
- Country: United States
- State: Minnesota
- County: Olmsted

Area
  - Total: 34.6 sq mi (89.6 km^{2})
  - Land: 34.6 sq mi (89.6 km^{2})
  - Water: 0 sq mi (0.0 km^{2})
- Elevation: 1,142 ft (348 m)

Population (2000)
  - Total: 440
  - Density: 13/sq mi (4.9/km^{2})
- Time zone: UTC-6 (Central (CST))
  - Summer (DST): UTC-5 (CDT)
- ZIP code: 55929
- Area code: 507
- FIPS code: 27-16282
- GNIS feature ID: 0663996

Dover Township is a township in Olmsted County, Minnesota, United States. The population was 440 at the 2000 census.

Dover Township was organized in 1859, and named after Dover, New Hampshire.

== Geography ==
According to the United States Census Bureau, the township has a total area of 34.6 square miles (90 km^{2}), all land.

== Demographics ==
As of the census of 2000, there were 440 people, 149 households, and 119 families residing in the township. The population density was 12.7 inhabitants per square mile (4.9/km^{2}). There were 150 housing units at an average density of 4.3 per square mile (1.7/km^{2}). The racial makeup of the township was 99.09% White, 0.23% African American, 0.23% Asian, and 0.45% from two or more races. Hispanic or Latino of any race were 0.68% of the population.

There were 149 households, out of which 40.3% had children under the age of 18 living with them, 72.5% were married couples living together, 4.7% had a female householder with no husband present, and 20.1% were non-families. 16.1% of all households were made up of individuals, and 7.4% had someone living alone who was 65 years of age or older. The average household size was 2.95 and the average family size was 3.35. In the township the population was spread out, with 29.5% under the age of 18, 9.3% from 18 to 24, 22.7% from 25 to 44, 25.7% from 45 to 64, and 12.7% who were 65 years of age or older. The median age was 38 years. For every 100 females, there were 122.2 males. For every 100 females age 18 and over, there were 116.8 males.

The median income for a household in the township was $43,393, and the median income for a family was $55,313. Males had a median income of $29,250 versus $22,000 for females. The per capita income for the township was $22,116. About 2.5% of families and 6.0% of the population were below the poverty line, including 6.5% of those under age 18 and 4.7% of those age 65 or over.

== See also ==
- Dover, Minnesota
