= Pleasant Grove Masonic Lodge =

- U.S. National Register of Historic Places
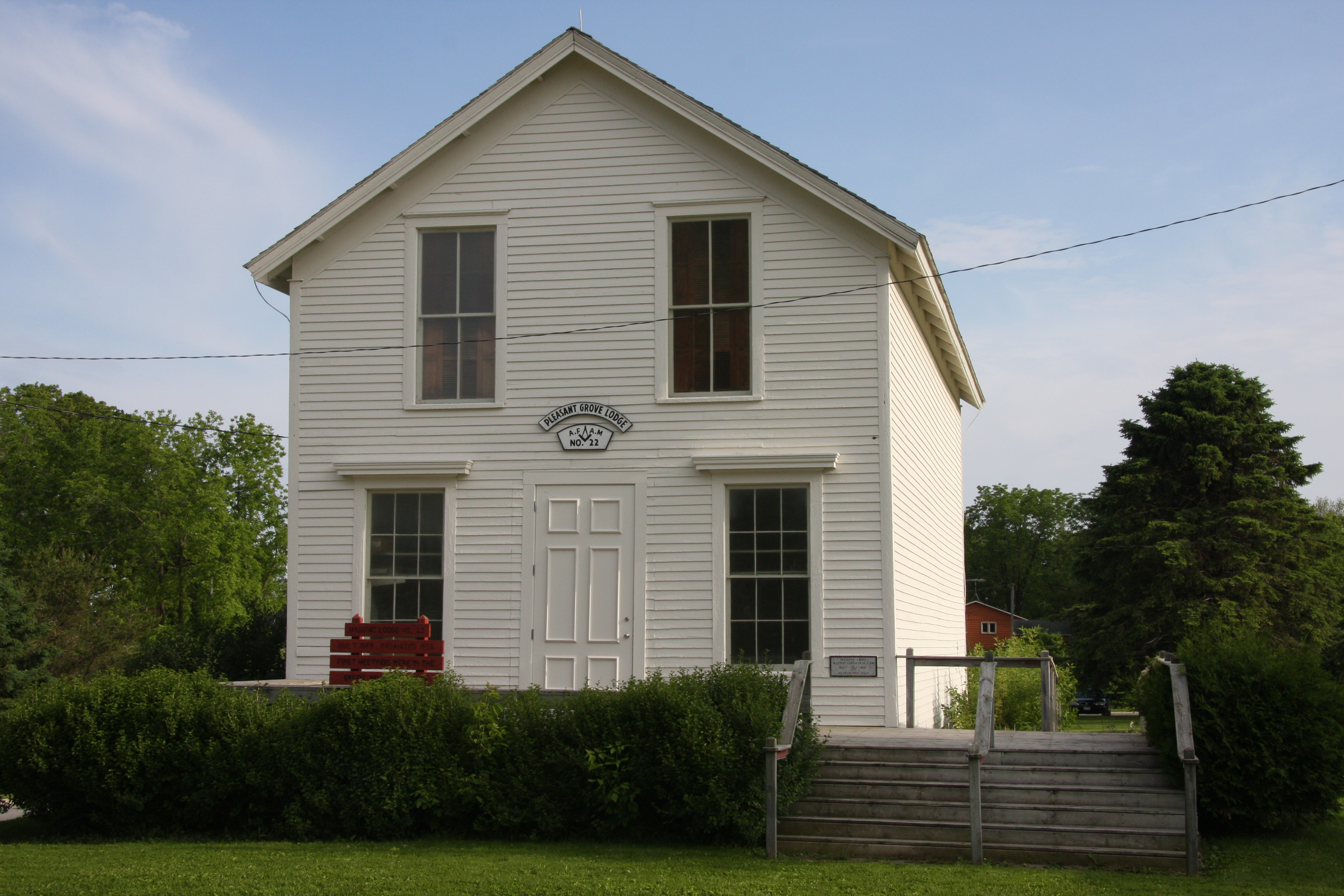

- Location within Minnesota Location within the United States
- Nearest city: Stewartville, Minnesota
- Coordinates: 43°52′12″N 92°23′4″W
- Area: less than one acre
- Built: 1868
- NRHP reference No.: 80002102
- Added to NRHP: October 10, 1980

The Masonic Lodge in Stewartville, Minnesota, United States, is a building from 1868. It was listed on the National Register of Historic Places in 1980.
