= Becky Lourey =

American politician

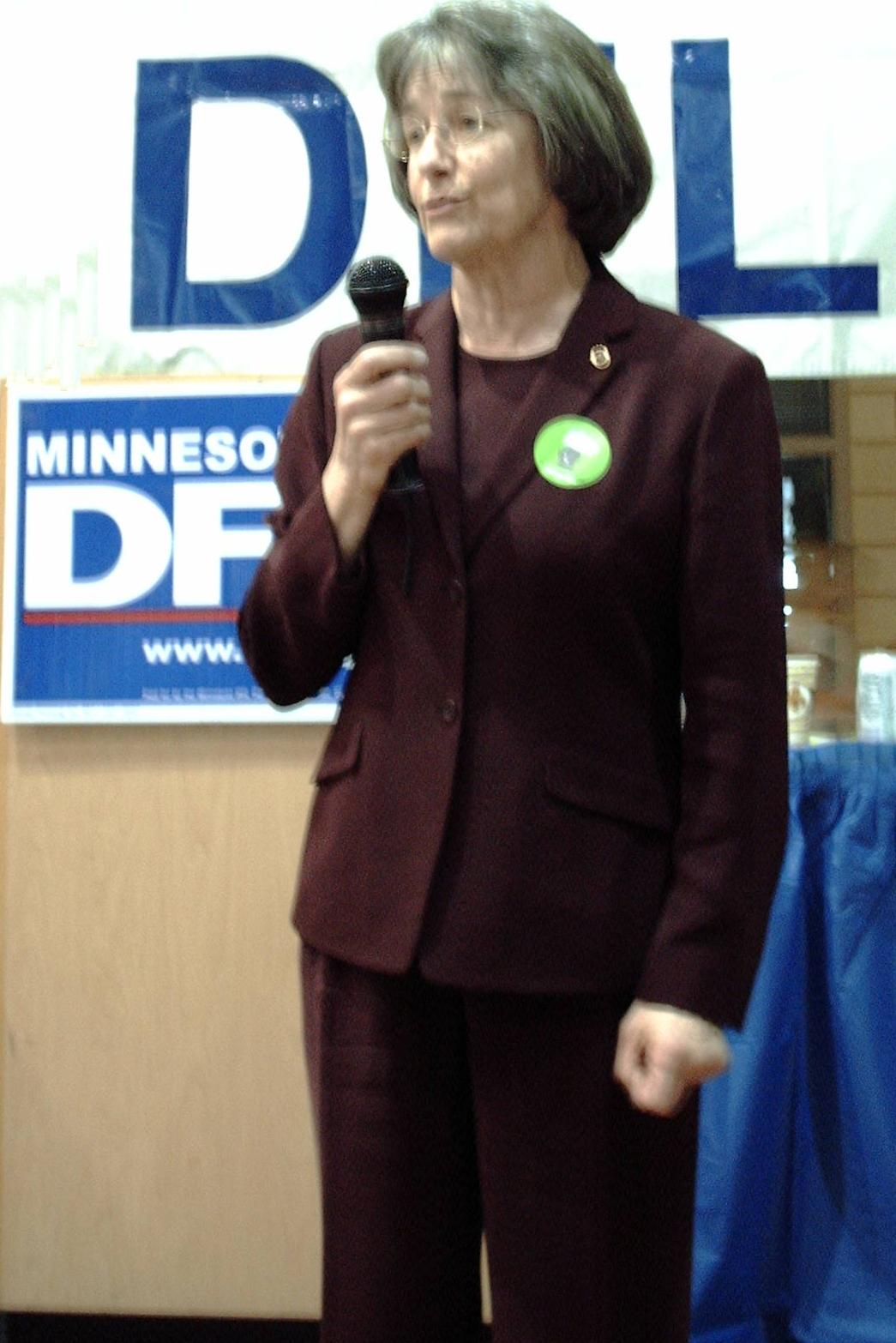
- Becky Lourey speaking to the Olmsted County DFL Convention in Rochester, Minnesota, in 2006.

Member of the Minnesota Senate from the 8th district
- In office January 7, 1997 – January 2, 2007
- Preceded by: Florian Chmielewski
- Succeeded by: Tony Lourey

Member of the Minnesota House of Representatives from the 14B and 8B district
- In office January 8, 1991 – January 6, 1997
- Preceded by: Doug Carlson
- Succeeded by: Bill Hilty

Personal details
- Born: September 24, 1943 (age 83) Little Falls, Minnesota
- Party: Minnesota Democratic-Farmer-Labor Party
- Spouse: Gene (deceased 2008)
- Children: 12
- Education: Asbury College; University of Minnesota
- Occupation: activist, homemaker, legislator

Becky Lourey (born September 24, 1943) is an American politician, a former Minnesota Democratic-Farmer-Labor Party (DFL) state senator and state representative, and a former Minnesota gubernatorial candidate. Her son Matt served in the U.S. Army and was killed on May 27, 2005, as a result of injuries received in combat over Buhriz, Iraq, where he was serving in his second tour of duty.

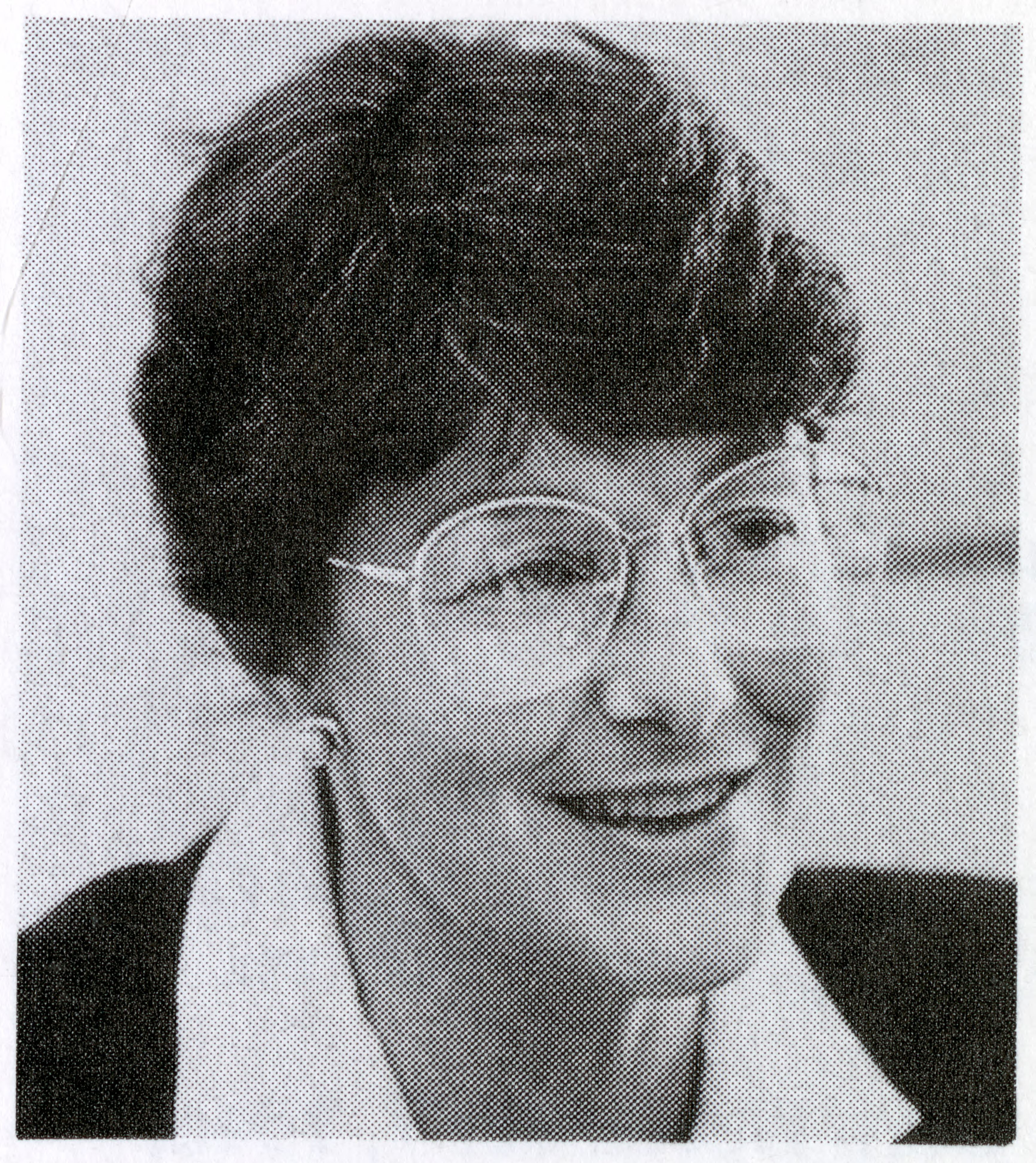
Representative Rebecca Jo Lourey, 1991-1992 Legislative Session, Minnesota Legislature.

Lourey was elected to the Minnesota House of Representatives in 1990, defeating a longtime incumbent Republican, and became the first woman to represent her rural district. She was reelected in 1992 and 1994. Lourey was elected to the Minnesota Senate in 1996, again defeating a veteran incumbent, later becoming chair of the Senate Health and Family Security Committee and earning a reputation as an expert on health care.

Lourey did not run for reelection in 2006. Her son Tony held her former seat until 2018, after which he was appointed to Governor Tim Walz's cabinet.

== 2006 campaign for governor ==
Lourey announced her candidacy for governor in November 2005. She lost the DFL Party endorsement to Attorney General Mike Hatch, gaining the support of 31% of the delegates on the first ballot, with 38% voting for Hatch and 29% voting for Steve Kelley. She withdrew from the endorsement process after the third ballot after falling behind Kelley, with Hatch's vote total increasing. She ran against Hatch in the September primary, losing with 24% of the vote.

Lourey's gubernatorial campaign health care platform was the Health Care Security Plan, which included a plan for universal health coverage in Minnesota by 2010. That system would have been voluntary, not mandatory, like the Massachusetts health program enacted in 2006. The platform also included other state-level health reform proposals, including the current Minnesota Medical Association's proposal.

At the heart of Lourey's health care plan was expanding and reforming MinnesotaCare, a state program providing health insurance to low-income Minnesotans that she, along with several others, had authored in the state legislature in 1993. Under Lourey's plan, all Minnesotans would have been eligible to join MinnesotaCare by 2010. Employers could participate by offering their employer plan via a BusinessCare program to be created as part of MinnesotaCare. Lourey's plan had several cost containment measures, including a requirement that any HMOs, private health insurers or Third Party Administrators receiving contracts to administer state-funded health plans spend no more than 5% on administrative expenses.

Lourey is the currently the owner of Nemadji Research Corporation, which specializes in "cost recovery and revenue maximization for health care providers."

== Electoral history ==
- 2006 race for governor - Democratic primary
  - Mike Hatch (DFL), 73%
  - Becky Lourey (DFL), 24%
- 2002 race for Minnesota Senate - District 8
  - Becky Lourey (DFL) (inc.), 55%
  - Bruce Nelson (R), 31%
  - Steve Keillor (IPL), 8%
- 2000 race for Minnesota Senate - District 8
  - Becky Lourey (DFL) (inc.), 68%
  - Dennis Janssen (R), 33%
