= George Stoppel Farmstead =

- U.S. National Register of Historic Places
- U.S. Historic district
- The farmstead buildings in 2021

- Location within Minnesota Location within the United States
- Location: Rochester Township, Olmsted County, at West Circle Drive, Rochester, Minnesota
- Coordinates: 44°0′29″N 92°30′35″W
- Built: 1861
- NRHP reference No.: 75001000
- Added to NRHP: May 12, 1975

The George Stoppel Farmstead is a pioneer farm located just outside the western city limits of Rochester, Minnesota, United States. The farmstead is owned and operated by the History Center of Olmsted County. It was listed on the National Register of Historic Places in 1975. It was nominated for being one of the few surviving mid-19th-century farmsteads in the urbanizing Rochester in the Rochester metropolitan area, with an architecturally distinctive farmhouse and smokehouse.

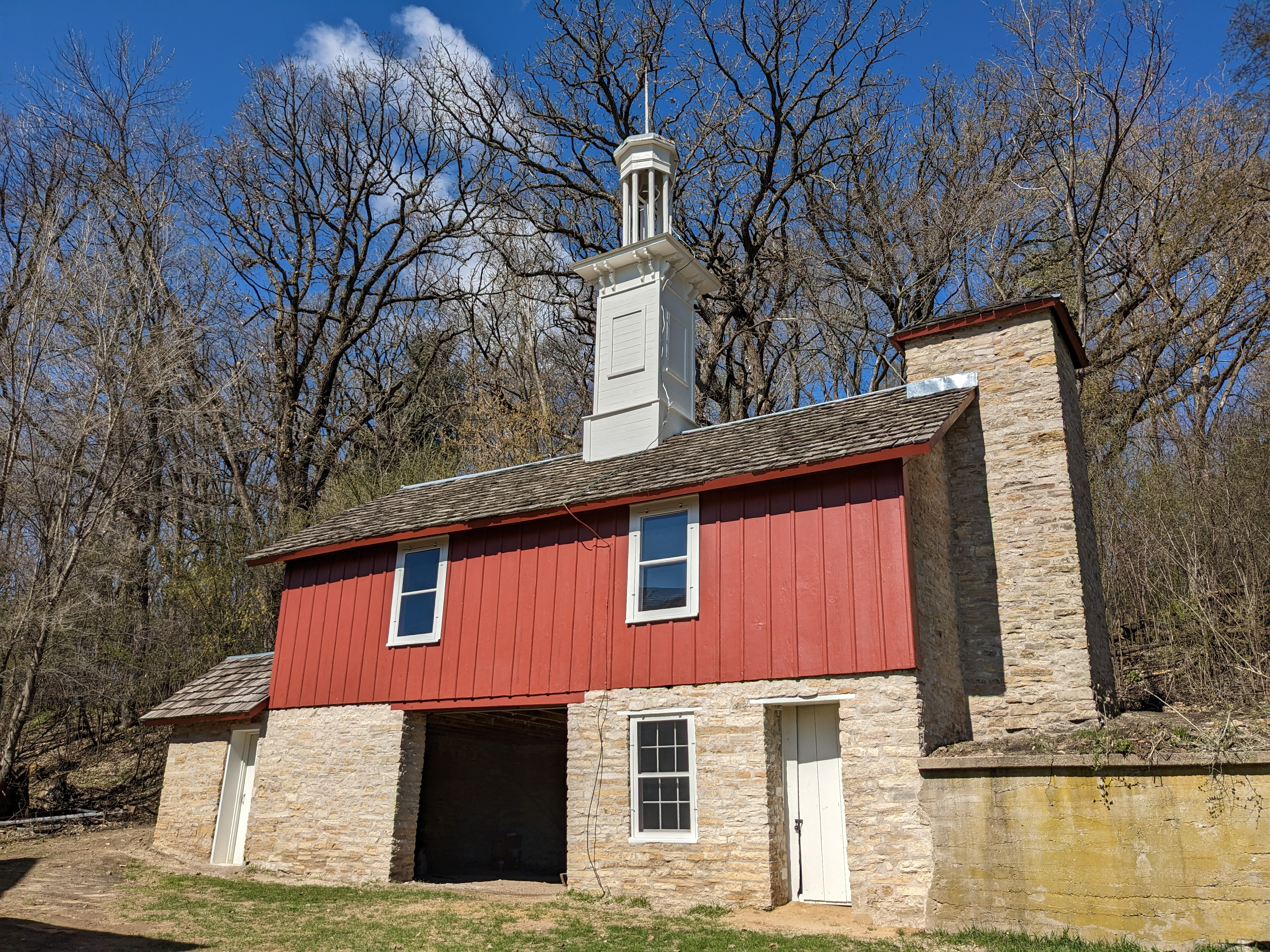
Smokehouse
