= Michael Cook (Minnesota politician) =

Minnesota politician and soldier

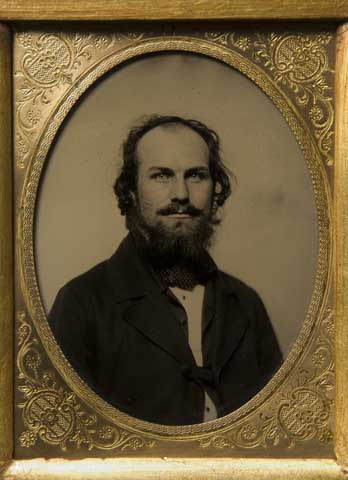
- Cook c. 1858

Member of the Minnesota Senate from the 5th District and 8th District
- In office December 2, 1857 – January 5, 1863
- Governor: Samuel Medary; Henry Hastings Sibley; Alexander Ramsey

Personal details
- Born: March 17, 1828 Morris County, New Jersey, U.S.
- Died: December 27, 1864 (aged 36) Nashville, Tennessee, U.S.
- Resting place: Oak Ridge Cemetery, Faribault, Minnesota, U.S.

Military service
- Allegiance: United States
- Branch/service: Union Army
- Years of service: 1862–1864
- Rank: Major
- Unit: 10th Minnesota Infantry Regiment
- Battles/wars: Dakota War of 1862; American Civil War

Michael Cook (March 17, 1828 – December 27, 1864) was an American carpenter, politician, and soldier. Cook served four terms in the Minnesota Senate from 1857 to 1863 and served as an officer in the Union Army during the American Civil War. Cook is the namesake of Cook County, Minnesota.

== Early life ==
Cook was born on March 17, 1828 in Morris County, New Jersey, he was the son of Richard Cook and Nellie Louisa Courter. Cook's family moved to New York where he studied architecture. Cook moved to Minnesota Territory in 1855 and settled in Faribault, Minnesota as a carpenter.

== Politics ==
Cook was first elected to the Minnesota Senate on October 13, 1857 as a senator representing Rice County, Minnesota. Cook served during the 1st, 2nd, 3rd, and 4th Minnesota Legislature from 1858 to 1863. During his tenure in the Minnesota senate Cook served on the committees for state affairs, Indian affairs, railroads, engrossments, and the state prison.

== Dakota War and Civil War ==
At the outbreak of the Dakota War of 1862 Cook volunteered for service in the Union Army and was commissioned as a Major in the 10th Minnesota Infantry Regiment on September 15, 1862. Cook assisted in commanding the regiment under Colonel James H. Baker and Lieutenant Colonel Samuel P. Jennison during the Dakota War at the Battle of Wood Lake and later served with the rest of the regiment in Sibley's 1863 Campaign in Dakota Territory.

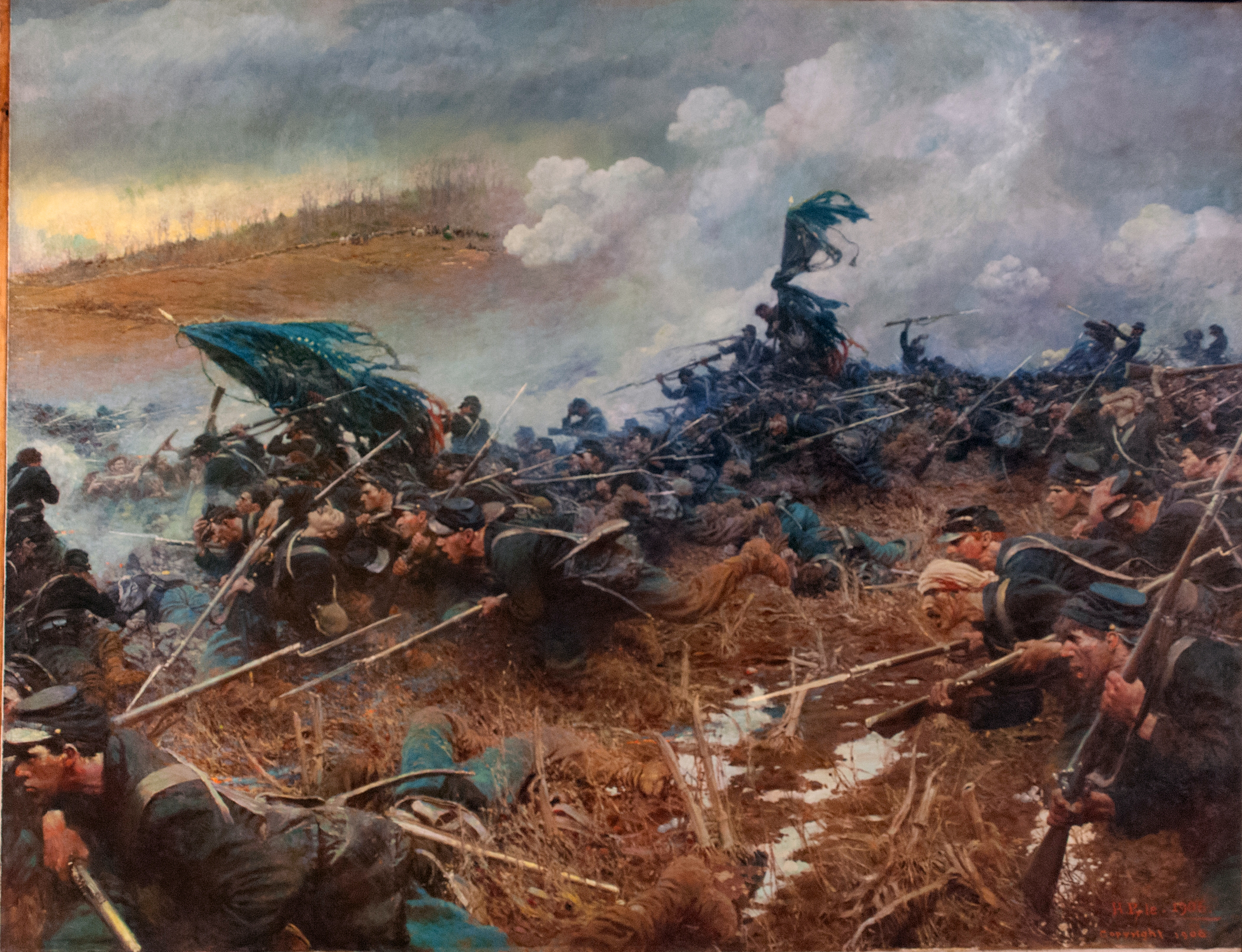
The Battle of Nashville, c. 1906 by Howard Pyle

When the 10th Minnesota was later rerouted to fight in the Western theater of the American Civil War in 1864 the regiment would take part in the Battle of Nashville during the broader Franklin–Nashville campaign. Cook was mortally wounded in the lungs on December 16, 1864 during the 10th Minnesota's main attack during the battle. Cook died 11 days later in a field hospital on December 27, 1864.

== Legacy ==
In 1874 a bill was introduced by senator Charles Hinman Graves in the Minnesota senate to name a county in Minnesota's Arrowhead Region after Pierre Gaultier de Varennes, sieur de La Vérendrye, the explorer who first explored Minnesota's northern boundary with Canada. Cook was later chosen as the county's namesake with the establishment of Cook County, Minnesota on March 9, 1874.
