= Tony Lourey =

American politician

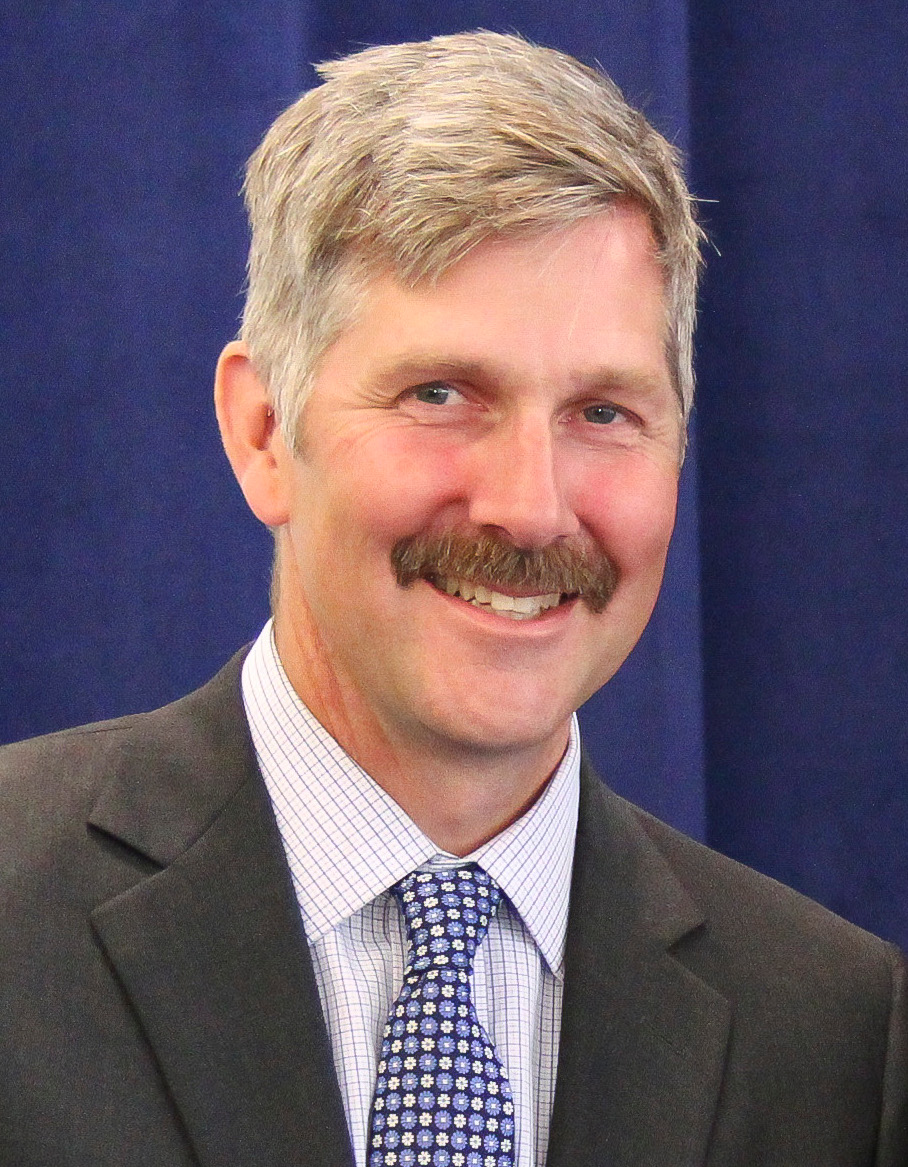

Minnesota Commissioner of Human Services
- In office January 7, 2019 – July 15, 2019
- Governor: Tim Walz
- Preceded by: Emily Johnson Piper

Member of the Minnesota Senate from the 11th district 8th (2007–2013)
- In office January 3, 2007 – January 3, 2019
- Preceded by: Becky Lourey
- Succeeded by: Bill Ingebrigtsen (8th), Jason Rarick (12th)

Personal details
- Born: August 15, 1967 (age 59) Pine County, Minnesota
- Party: Democratic–Farmer–Labor
- Spouse: Marlana Benzie
- Children: 3
- Education: University of Minnesota; Hamline University School of Law; William Mitchell College of Law
- Occupation: farmer

Tony Lourey (born August 15, 1967) is an American politician. He is a former Minnesota commissioner of human services and former Democratic–Farmer–Labor (DFL) member of the Minnesota Senate, representing District 11.

== Early life, education, and career ==
Lourey was born in Pine County, Minnesota. He attended the University of Minnesota, graduating with a Bachelor of Arts, Hamline University School of Law, and William Mitchell College of Law, graduating with a Juris Doctor in 2011. Before his election to the Senate, he was a township supervisor of Kerrick Township for eight years.

== Political career ==
Lourey was elected to the Minnesota Senate in 2006 to represent District 8, succeeding his mother, Becky Lourey. He was reelected in 2010. After redistricting, he was elected to represent District 11—which included Carlton and Pine counties and parts of Kanabec and St. Louis counties in the northeast—in 2012 and reelected in 2016. He resigned on January 3, 2019, after Governor Tim Walz selected him as commissioner of human services.

== Personal life ==
Lourey and his wife, Marlana Benzie-Lourey, have three children. They are the owners of the Askov American newspaper, which was founded by former legislator and governor Hjalmar Petersen.
