= Eyota, Minnesota =

City in Minnesota, United States

Eyota
- City
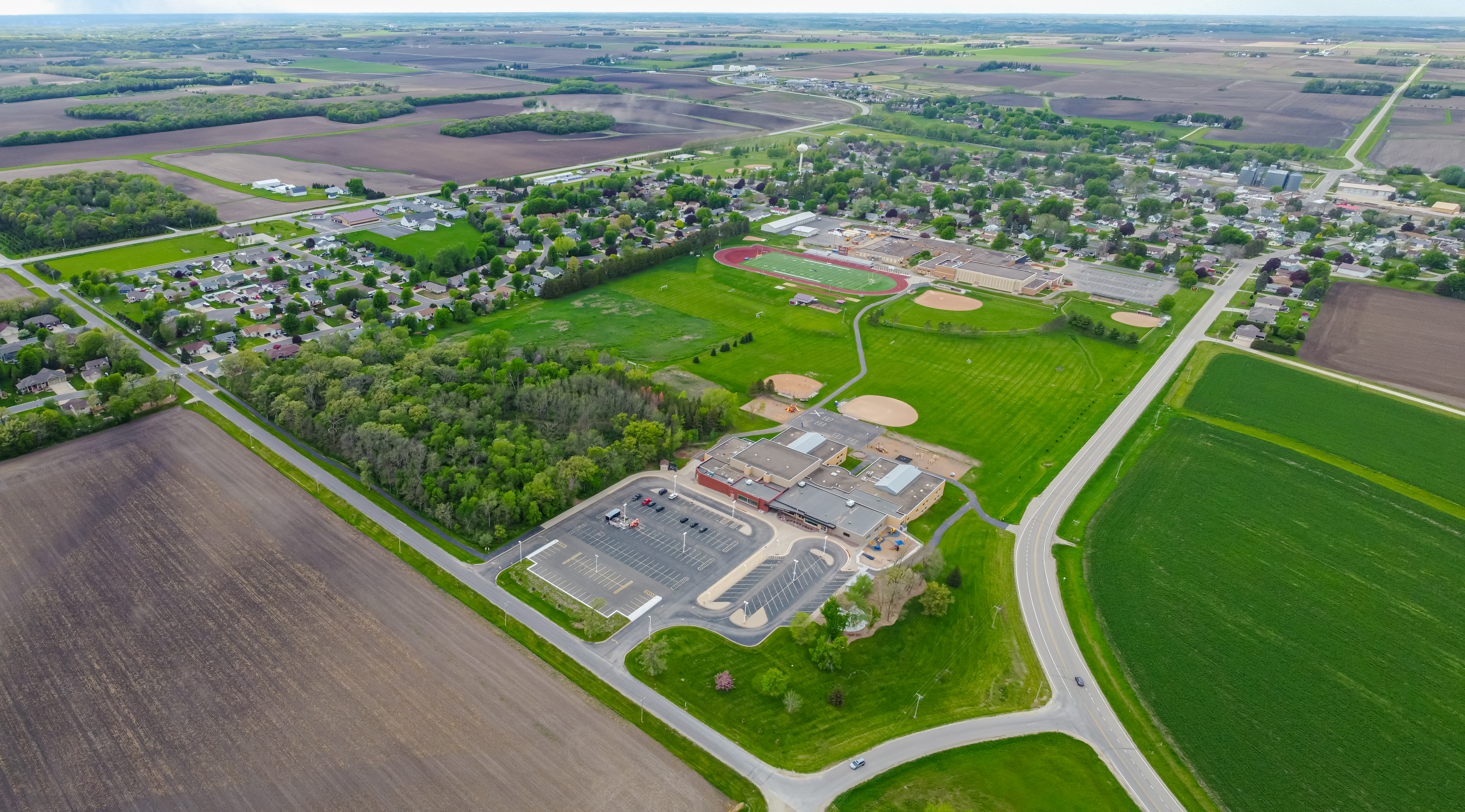
- US-14 and MN-42 run through town

- Location of Eyota, Minnesota
- Coordinates: 43°59′20″N 92°13′50″W
- Country: United States
- State: Minnesota
- County: Olmsted

Area
  - Total: 1.69 sq mi (4.37 km^{2})
  - Land: 1.69 sq mi (4.37 km^{2})
  - Water: 0 sq mi (0.00 km^{2})
- Elevation: 1,253 ft (382 m)

Population (2020)
  - Total: 2,006
  - Density: 1,188.2/sq mi (458.78/km^{2})
- Time zone: UTC-6 (Central (CST))
  - Summer (DST): UTC-5 (CDT)
- ZIP code: 55934
- Area code: 507
- FIPS code: 27-20114
- GNIS feature ID: 2394722
- Website: https://eyota.govoffice.com/

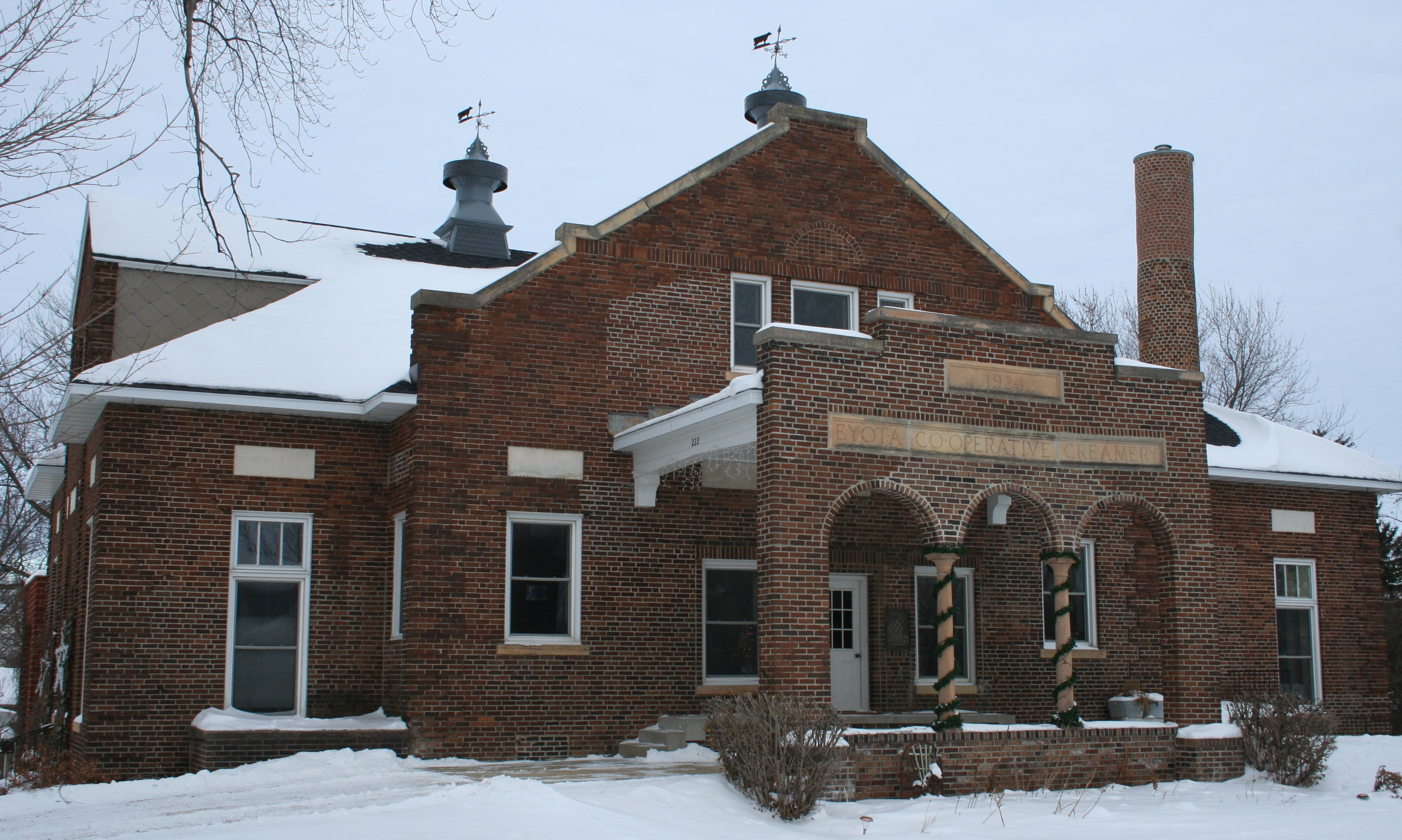
Eyota Creamery, built 1924.

Eyota (/iˈjoʊtə/ ee-YOH-tə) is a city in Olmsted County, Minnesota, United States. The population was 2,006 at the 2020 census.

== History ==
Eyota was platted in 1864. The name Eyota is derived from the Dakota word iyótaŋ, meaning "greatest" or "most". A post office has been in operation at Eyota since 1864. The city was incorporated on February 16, 1875.

Settlers had begun arriving in the area and staking claims in 1854. The earliest, Benjamin Bear, initially came in 1853 to choose a prime site with an ever-flowing spring, then returned the following year with his family. A stream called Bear Creek starts from this spring. (Today Chester Woods Lake is formed around a portion of Bear Creek that was held back behind a dam built to protect nearby Rochester from flooding.)

In the early years Eyota was an important destination for business travelers and mail, and shipping point for locally raised grain and cattle. It was located only a mile from a wye with rail extensions going north to Plainview and south to Chatfield, making Eyota a stopping point for travelers on their way to other places. (Daily trains to Chatfield and Plainview left from the Eyota depot.) The railroad was an important local employer, The railroad later became the Chicago & North Western Railway.

Eyota streets were laid out on the farmland of Milo Matteson by investor Samuel E. Everett, a speculator from New York State. A downtown district, built only on the south side of the street, faced the busy railroad yard. A large hotel, frequented by business travelers, called the Everett House, was located along this street (South Front Street).

Charles P. Russell, another early investor, built a store on the corner of South Front Street and Center Avenue in 1865. Russell continued living in the community (whereas Mr. Everett soon moved on). He built a fine two-story home and bought grain from local farmers with his business partner O.H. Jackson. Years later, in 1910, Charles Russell partnered in the banking and mercantile businesses with his son, Fred Russell.

A whole line of stores flanked on the ends by the C.P Russell building and the Everett House faced the railroad depot and yard to the north. Establishments included hardware, lumber, wagon and harness makers, livery, drug store, general mercantile, hotels and several saloons.

Doctor Augustus Stinchfield was Eyota's first medical doctor, who came to town after Eyota druggist E.D. Dyar invited him to visit. Both Stinchfield and Dyar once lived in Strong, Maine. Dr. Stinchfield built up an extensive practice, having another office in nearby St. Charles and using part of his home as a hospital. Stinchfield married Martha Bear, the daughter of early settler Benjamin Bear. He arrived in 1873 and left in 1892 when the Mayos from Rochester convinced him to become the first non-family member to partner in their practice.

Dr. Rollo C. Dugan, the son of local settler Elijah Dugan, followed Stinchfield's local practice. He built the Eyota Hospital, an eight-bed facility on Second Street in 1900.

== Geography ==
According to the United States Census Bureau, the city has a total area of 1.69 square miles (4.38 km^{2}), all land.

The south branch of the Whitewater River passes through the northern edge of the city.

U.S. Route 14 and Minnesota State Highway 42 are two of the main routes in the community. Interstate 90 is immediately south of the city.

== Demographics ==
Historical population
| Census | Pop. | Note | %± |
|---|---|---|---|
| 1880 | 404 | | — |
| 1890 | 377 | | −6.7% |
| 1900 | 424 | | 12.5% |
| 1910 | 423 | | −0.2% |
| 1920 | 403 | | −4.7% |
| 1930 | 404 | | 0.2% |
| 1940 | 438 | | 8.4% |
| 1950 | 495 | | 13.0% |
| 1960 | 558 | | 12.7% |
| 1970 | 639 | | 14.5% |
| 1980 | 1,244 | | 94.7% |
| 1990 | 1,448 | | 16.4% |
| 2000 | 1,644 | | 13.5% |
| 2010 | 1,977 | | 20.3% |
| 2020 | 2,006 | | 1.5% |
U.S. Decennial Census

=== 2020 census ===
As of the 2020 census, Eyota had a population of 2,006. The median age was 37.8 years. 27.9% of residents were under the age of 18 and 16.0% of residents were 65 years of age or older. For every 100 females there were 97.6 males, and for every 100 females age 18 and over there were 95.5 males age 18 and over.

0.0% of residents lived in urban areas, while 100.0% lived in rural areas.

There were 747 households in Eyota, of which 39.4% had children under the age of 18 living in them. Of all households, 55.3% were married-couple households, 15.7% were households with a male householder and no spouse or partner present, and 21.4% were households with a female householder and no spouse or partner present. About 22.7% of all households were made up of individuals and 9.9% had someone living alone who was 65 years of age or older.

There were 781 housing units, of which 4.4% were vacant. The homeowner vacancy rate was 0.6% and the rental vacancy rate was 9.0%.

Racial composition as of the 2020 census
| Race | Number | Percent |
|---|---|---|
| White | 1,866 | 93.0% |
| Black or African American | 18 | 0.9% |
| American Indian and Alaska Native | 1 | 0.0% |
| Asian | 9 | 0.4% |
| Native Hawaiian and Other Pacific Islander | 0 | 0.0% |
| Some other race | 24 | 1.2% |
| Two or more races | 88 | 4.4% |
| Hispanic or Latino (of any race) | 40 | 2.0% |

=== 2010 census ===
As of the census of 2010, there were 1,977 people, 758 households, and 542 families living in the city. The population density was 1,169.8 inhabitants per square mile (451.7/km^{2}). There were 790 housing units at an average density of 467.5 per square mile (180.5/km^{2}). The racial makeup of the city was 98.9% White, 0.2% African American, 0.1% Native American, 0.2% Asian, 0.2% from other races, and 0.4% from two or more races. Hispanic or Latino of any race were 0.7% of the population.

There were 758 households, of which 41.3% had children under the age of 18 living with them, 56.5% were married couples living together, 10.2% had a female householder with no husband present, 4.9% had a male householder with no wife present, and 28.5% were non-families. 24.0% of all households were made up of individuals, and 9.7% had someone living alone who was 65 years of age or older. The average household size was 2.61 and the average family size was 3.11.

The median age in the city was 34.4 years. 30.3% of residents were under the age of 18; 6.7% were between the ages of 18 and 24; 27.7% were from 25 to 44; 24.5% were from 45 to 64; and 10.9% were 65 years of age or older. The gender makeup of the city was 49.8% male and 50.2% female.

=== 2000 census ===
As of the census of 2000, there were 1,644 people, 597 households, and 456 families living in the city. The population density was 1,058.4 inhabitants per square mile (408.7/km^{2}). There were 614 housing units at an average density of 395.3 per square mile (152.6/km^{2}). The racial makeup of the city was 98.36% White, 0.18% African American, 0.12% Native American, 0.43% Asian, 0.06% from other races, and 0.85% from two or more races. Hispanic or Latino of any race were 0.43% of the population.

There were 597 households, out of which 44.6% had children under the age of 18 living with them, 60.1% were married couples living together, 10.4% had a female householder with no husband present, and 23.5% were non-families. 19.4% of all households were made up of individuals, and 7.4% had someone living alone who was 65 years of age or older. The average household size was 2.75 and the average family size was 3.15.

In the city, the population was spread out, with 31.7% under the age of 18, 8.2% from 18 to 24, 30.8% from 25 to 44, 20.2% from 45 to 64, and 9.1% who were 65 years of age or older. The median age was 32 years. For every 100 females, there were 92.3 males. For every 100 females age 18 and over, there were 96.0 males.

The median income for a household in the city was $47,500, and the median income for a family was $53,036. Males had a median income of $36,548 versus $28,259 for females. The per capita income for the city was $18,471. About 2.8% of families and 3.2% of the population were below the poverty line, including 3.5% of those under age 18 and 8.1% of those age 65 or over.

== Government ==
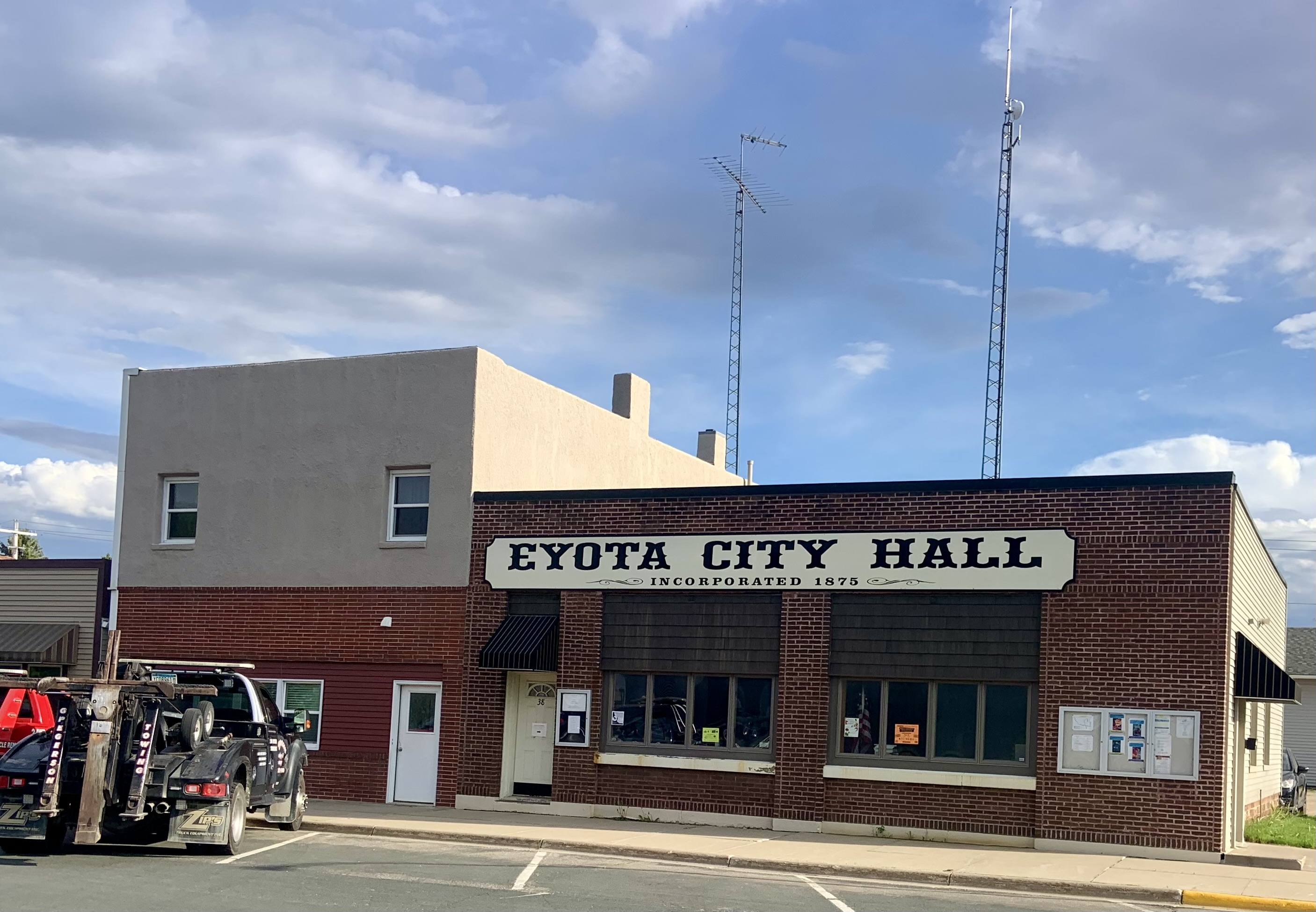
Eyota City Hall

The city government consists of a mayor and four council members. Mayoral terms are two years.

== Education ==
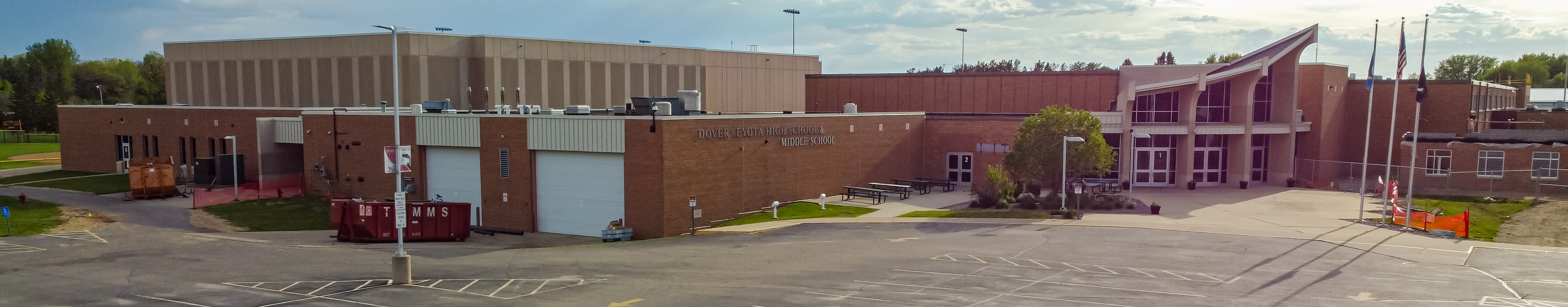
Dover-Eyota schools

Eyota is part of the Dover-Eyota School District.

== Notable people ==
- H. H. Atherton, Minnesota state senator; served as postmaster of Eyota
- Donald T. Franke, Minnesota state legislator, was born in Eyota.
- Ralph L. Mayhood, Minnesota state legislator, was born in Eyota.
