= Minnesota's 7th Senate district =

American legislative district

Minnesota's 7th State Senate district
Senator
| Robert Farnsworth; R–Chisholm |
since 2023
- Population (2020): 85,206

The Minnesota Senate, District 7, is located in St. Louis County and centered on the city of Duluth. It is currently represented by Republican Robert Farnsworth.

== List of senators ==
| Session | Image | Senator | Party | Term start | Term end | Home | Location |
|---|---|---|---|---|---|---|---|
| 1st | | Richard G. Murphy | Non | December 2, 1857 | December 6, 1859 | Shakopee | Scott |
| 2nd | | J.F. Baldwin | Non | December 7, 1859 | January 7, 1861 | Belle Plaine | Scott |
| 3rd | | Archibald Hayes | Non | January 8, 1861 | January 6, 1862 | Hastings | Dakota |
| 4th | | Charles Whippo Nash | Dem | January 7, 1862 | January 4, 1864 | Hastings | Dakota |
| 5th | | Charles Whippo Nash | Dem | January 7, 1862 | January 4, 1864 | Hastings | Dakota |
| 6th | | Dudley F. Langley | Non | January 5, 1864 | January 7, 1867 | Hastings | Dakota |
| 7th | | Dudley F. Langley | Non | January 5, 1864 | January 7, 1867 | Hastings | Dakota |
| 8th | | Dudley F. Langley | Non | January 5, 1864 | January 7, 1867 | Hastings | Dakota |
| 9th | | N.C. Draper | Rep | January 8, 1867 | January 6, 1868 | Hastings | Dakota |
| 10th | | Seagrave Smith | Dem | January 7, 1868 | January 3, 1870 | Hastings | Dakota |
| 11th | | Seagrave Smith | Dem | January 7, 1868 | January 3, 1870 | Hastings | Dakota |
| 12th | | Reuben Chewning | Dem | January 4, 1870 | January 1, 1872 | Farmington | Dakota |
| 13th | | Reuben Chewning | Dem | January 4, 1870 | January 1, 1872 | Farmington | Dakota |
| 14th | | Samuel S. Beman | Rep | January 2, 1872 | January 4, 1875 | St. Charles | Winona |
| 15th | | Samuel S. Beman | Rep | January 2, 1872 | January 4, 1875 | St. Charles | Winona |
| 16th | | Samuel S. Beman | Rep | January 2, 1872 | January 4, 1875 | St. Charles | Winona |
| 17th | | H.W. Hill | Dem | January 5, 1875 | January 1, 1877 | St. Charles | Winona |
| 18th | | H.W. Hill | Dem | January 5, 1875 | January 1, 1877 | St. Charles | Winona |
| 19th | | J.F. Remore | Rep | January 2, 1877 | January 6, 1879 | St. Charles | Winona |
| 20th | | J.F. Remore | Rep | January 2, 1877 | January 6, 1879 | St. Charles | Winona |
| 21st | | H.W. Hill | Dem | January 7, 1879 | January 3, 1881 | St. Charles | Winona |
| 22nd | | Samuel Beman | Rep | January 4, 1881 | January 1, 1883 | St. Charles | Winona |
| 23rd | | A.M. Crosby | Non | January 2, 1883 | January 3, 1887 | Adrian | Murray Nobles Pipestone Rock |
| 24th | | A.M. Crosby | Non | January 2, 1883 | January 3, 1887 | Adrian | Murray Nobles Pipestone Rock |
| 25th | | Warrington Brown | Rep | January 4, 1887 | January 5, 1891 | Pipestone | Murray Nobles Pipestone Rock |
| 26th | | Warrington Brown | Rep | January 4, 1887 | January 5, 1891 | Pipestone | Murray Nobles Pipestone Rock |
| 27th | | Jay LaDue | Alliance | January 6, 1891 | January 7, 1895 | Luverne | Murray Nobles Pipestone Rock |
| 28th | | Jay LaDue | Dem | January 6, 1891 | January 7, 1895 | Luverne | Murray Nobles Pipestone Rock |
| 29th | | Herbert J. Miller | Rep | January 8, 1895 | January 2, 1899 | Luverne | Murray Nobles Pipestone Rock |
| 30th | | Herbert J. Miller | Rep | January 8, 1895 | January 2, 1899 | Luverne | Murray Nobles Pipestone Rock |
| 31st | | Samuel Lord | Rep | January 3, 1899 | January 7, 1907 | Kasson | Dodge |
| 32nd | | Samuel Lord | Rep | January 3, 1899 | January 7, 1907 | Kasson | Dodge |
| 33rd | | Samuel Lord | Rep | January 3, 1899 | January 7, 1907 | Kasson | Dodge |
| 34th | | Samuel Lord | Rep | January 3, 1899 | January 7, 1907 | Kasson | Dodge |
| 35th | | Daniel E. White | Rep | January 8, 1907 | January 2, 1911 | Claremont | Dodge |
| 36th | | Daniel E. White | Rep | January 8, 1907 | January 2, 1911 | Claremont | Dodge |
| 37th | | Fremont Jackson Thoe | Rep | January 3, 1911 | January 4, 1915 | Hayfield | Dodge |
| 38th | | Fremont Jackson Thoe | Rep | January 3, 1911 | January 4, 1915 | Hayfield | Dodge |
| 39th | | Frank E. Putnam | Rep | January 5, 1915 | January 5, 1931 | Blue Earth | Faribault |
| 40th | | Frank E. Putnam | Rep | January 5, 1915 | January 5, 1931 | Blue Earth | Faribault |
| 41st | | Frank E. Putnam | Rep | January 5, 1915 | January 5, 1931 | Blue Earth | Faribault |
| 42nd | | Frank E. Putnam | Rep | January 5, 1915 | January 5, 1931 | Blue Earth | Faribault |
| 43rd | | Frank E. Putnam | Rep | January 5, 1915 | January 5, 1931 | Blue Earth | Faribault |
| 44th | | Frank E. Putnam | Rep | January 5, 1915 | January 5, 1931 | Blue Earth | Faribault |
| 45th | | Frank E. Putnam | Rep | January 5, 1915 | January 5, 1931 | Blue Earth | Faribault |
| 46th | | Frank E. Putnam | Rep | January 5, 1915 | January 5, 1931 | Blue Earth | Faribault |
| 47th | | Charles Leonard Todd | Non | January 6, 1931 | September 9, 1932 | Wells | Faribault |
| 47th | Vacant | | September 9, 1932 | January 3, 1933 | | | Faribault |
| 48th | | Daniel D. Murphy | Lib | January 3, 1933 | December 3, 1944 | Blue Earth | Faribault |
| 49th | | Daniel D. Murphy | Lib | January 3, 1933 | December 3, 1944 | Blue Earth | Faribault |
| 50th | | Daniel D. Murphy | Lib | January 3, 1933 | December 3, 1944 | Blue Earth | Faribault |
| 51st | | Daniel D. Murphy | Lib | January 3, 1933 | December 3, 1944 | Blue Earth | Faribault |
| 52nd | | Daniel D. Murphy | Lib | January 3, 1933 | December 3, 1944 | Blue Earth | Faribault |
| 53rd | | Daniel D. Murphy | Lib | January 3, 1933 | December 3, 1944 | Blue Earth | Faribault |
| 53rd | Vacant | | December 3, 1944 | January 2, 1945 | | | Faribault |
| 54th | | David M. Carey | Con | January 2, 1945 | January 3, 1955 | Wells | Faribault |
| 55th | | David M. Carey | Con | January 2, 1945 | January 3, 1955 | Wells | Faribault |
| 56th | | David M. Carey | Con | January 2, 1945 | January 3, 1955 | Wells | Faribault |
| 57th | | David M. Carey | Con | January 2, 1945 | January 3, 1955 | Wells | Faribault |
| 58th | | David M. Carey | Con | January 2, 1945 | January 3, 1955 | Wells | Faribault |
| 59th | | Ernest Noral Jerome Anderson | Con | January 4, 1955 | January 5, 1959 | Frost | Faribault |
| 60th | | Ernest Noral Jerome Anderson | Con | January 4, 1955 | January 5, 1959 | Frost | Faribault |
| 61st | | Ernest Noral Jerome Anderson | Con | January 4, 1955 | January 5, 1959 | Frost | Faribault |
| 62nd | | Ernest Noral Jerome Anderson | Con | January 4, 1955 | January 5, 1959 | Frost | Faribault |
| 63rd | | Arnin Orvin Sundet | Con | January 6, 1959 | January 4, 1971 | Faribault | Le Sueur Rice |
| 64th | | Arnin Orvin Sundet | Con | January 6, 1959 | January 4, 1971 | Faribault | Le Sueur Rice |
| 65th | | Arnin Orvin Sundet | Con | January 6, 1959 | January 4, 1971 | Faribault | Le Sueur Rice |
| 66th | | Arnin Orvin Sundet | Con | January 6, 1959 | January 4, 1971 | Faribault | Le Sueur Rice |
| 67th | | Clarence Mark Purfeest | Lib | January 5, 1971 | January 1, 1973 | Faribault | Le Sueur Rice |
| 68th | | Sam Solon | DFL | January 2, 1973 | December 28, 2001 | Duluth | St. Louis |
| 69th | | Sam Solon | DFL | January 2, 1973 | December 28, 2001 | Duluth | St. Louis |
| 70th | | Sam Solon | DFL | January 2, 1973 | December 28, 2001 | Duluth | St. Louis |
| 71st | | Sam Solon | DFL | January 2, 1973 | December 28, 2001 | Duluth | St. Louis |
| 72nd | | Sam Solon | DFL | January 2, 1973 | December 28, 2001 | Duluth | St. Louis |
| 73rd | | Sam Solon | DFL | January 2, 1973 | December 28, 2001 | Duluth | St. Louis |
| 74th | | Sam Solon | DFL | January 2, 1973 | December 28, 2001 | Duluth | St. Louis |
| 75th | | Sam Solon | DFL | January 2, 1973 | December 28, 2001 | Duluth | St. Louis |
| 76th | | Sam Solon | DFL | January 2, 1973 | December 28, 2001 | Duluth | St. Louis |
| 77th | | Sam Solon | DFL | January 2, 1973 | December 28, 2001 | Duluth | St. Louis |
| 78th | | Sam Solon | DFL | January 2, 1973 | December 28, 2001 | Duluth | St. Louis |
| 79th | | Sam Solon | DFL | January 2, 1973 | December 28, 2001 | Duluth | St. Louis |
| 80th | | Sam Solon | DFL | January 2, 1973 | December 28, 2001 | Duluth | St. Louis |
| 81st | | Sam Solon | DFL | January 2, 1973 | December 28, 2001 | Duluth | St. Louis |
| 82nd | | Sam Solon | DFL | January 2, 1973 | December 28, 2001 | Duluth | St. Louis |
| 82nd | | Vacant | | December 28, 2001 | February 4, 2002 | | St. Louis |
| 83rd | | Yvonne Prettner Solon | DFL | February 4, 2002 | January 3, 2011 | Duluth | St. Louis |
| 84th | | Yvonne Prettner Solon | DFL | February 4, 2002 | January 3, 2011 | Duluth | St. Louis |
| 85th | | Yvonne Prettner Solon | DFL | February 4, 2002 | January 3, 2011 | Duluth | St. Louis |
| 86th | | Yvonne Prettner Solon | DFL | February 4, 2002 | January 3, 2011 | Duluth | St. Louis |
| 87th | | Roger Reinert | DFL | January 4, 2011 | January 2, 2017 | Duluth | St. Louis |
| 88th | | Roger Reinert | DFL | January 4, 2011 | January 2, 2017 | Duluth | St. Louis |
| 89th | | Roger Reinert | DFL | January 4, 2011 | January 2, 2017 | Duluth | St. Louis |
| 90th | | Erik Simonson | DFL | January 3, 2017 | January 4, 2021 | Duluth | St. Louis |
| 91st | | Jen McEwen | DFL | January 5, 2021 | January 3, 2023 | Duluth | St. Louis |
| 92nd | | Robert Farnsworth | Republican | January 5, 2021 | January 3, 2023 | Chisholm | St. Louis |
| 93rd | | Robert Farnsworth | Republican | January 5, 2021 | January 3, 2023 | Chisholm | St. Louis |
| 94th | | Robert Farnsworth | Republican | January 5, 2021 | January 3, 2023 | Chisholm | St. Louis |
