= Southern Minnesota Museum of Natural History =

Coordinates: 43°38′20″N 94°06′08″W

The Southern Minnesota Museum of Natural History is a natural history museum in Blue Earth, Minnesota. The museum contains minerals, a collection of fossils including a tyrannosaur skeleton and an ammonite, a specimen of the world's largest beetle species, and 7,000 year old bison bones.
