= Frank Putnam =

Frank Putnam may refer to:

- Frank Putnam (politician), Canadian politician, member of the Legislative Assembly of British Columbia
- Frank E. Putnam, American politician, member of the Minnesota Senate
- Frank W. Putnam, American biochemist
