= Robert Farnsworth (politician) =

American politician

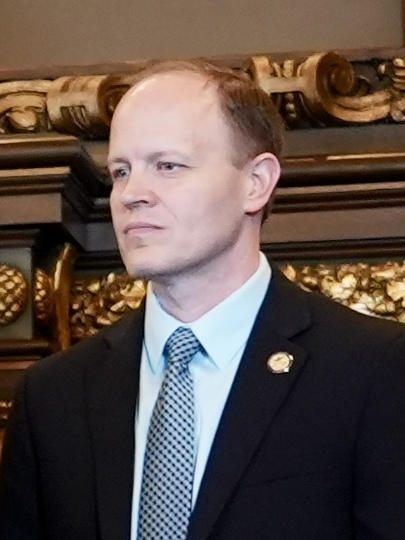

Member of the Minnesota Senate from the 7th district
- Incumbent
- Assumed office January 3, 2023
- Preceded by: Jen McEwen

Personal details
- Party: Republican
- Children: 4
- Education: University of St. Thomas (BA); Minnesota State University, Mankato (MS)

Robert D. Farnsworth is an American politician serving as a member of the Minnesota Senate for the 7th district. Elected in November 2022, he assumed office on January 3, 2023. He represents a section of Minnesota's Iron Range.

== Early life and education ==
Farnsworth was raised in Chisholm, Minnesota, and graduated from Chisholm High School. He earned a Bachelor of Arts degree in history and social studies from the University of St. Thomas and a Master of Science in special education from Minnesota State University, Mankato.

== Career ==
Prior to entering politics, Farnsworth worked as a high school social studies teacher at Mounds View High School. He worked as a teacher for the Minnesota Department of Corrections at Red Wing and Togo before being hired as a special education teacher with the Hibbing School District. He is also a real estate agent with Village Realty. Farnsworth was elected to the Minnesota Senate in November 2022 and assumed office on January 3, 2023. Through redistricting, he succeeded the recently deceased David Tomassoni, who was a Democrat-turned-independent.
