= Charles Leonard Todd =

American politician (1871–1932)

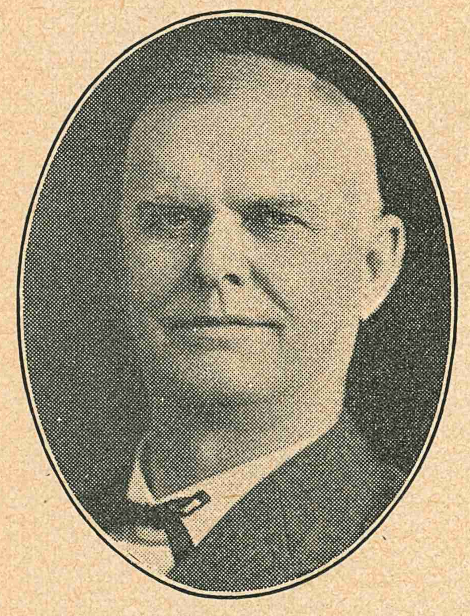

Member of the Minnesota Senate from the 7th district
- In office January 6, 1931 – September 9, 1932
- Preceded by: Frank E. Putnam
- Succeeded by: Daniel D. Murphy

Personal details
- Born: June 22, 1871 Bristol, Worth County, Iowa, U.S.
- Died: September 9, 1932 (aged 61) Wells, Minnesota, U.S.
- Spouse: Winnefred Ketzeback (m. 1893)
- Children: 3
- Parent(s): Wyvil Boteler Todd; Anna Maria Schiefer
- Relatives: Jerry Newton (great-nephew)
- Education: Decorah Institute
- Profession: Politician, farmer, businessman

Charles Leonard "C.L." Todd (June 22, 1871 – September 9, 1932) was an American politician, farmer, and businessman who served in the Minnesota Senate from 1931 to 1932, representing the 7th legislative district of Minnesota in the 47th Minnesota Legislature.

== Early life and education ==
Todd was born in Bristol, located in Worth County, Iowa, on June 22, 1871, to Wyvil Boteler Todd and Anna Maria Schiefer. He attended public schools in Lake Mills, Iowa, as well as the Decorah Institute, located in Decorah, Iowa. Todd also studied law in both Northwood and Forest City.

== Career ==
Todd served in the Minnesota Senate from 1931 until his death in office in 1932. He represented the 7th legislative district of Minnesota in the 47th Minnesota Legislature.

During his time in office, Todd served on the following committees. He chaired the Municipal Affairs committee.

- Banks and Banking
- Drainage
- Elections
- Finance
- General Legislation
- Municipal Affairs
- Public Highways
- Reapportionment
- Temperance

Todd's time in office began on January 6, 1931, and concluded on September 9, 1932. His district included representation for Faribault County.

Outside of the Minnesota Legislature, Todd was a farmer and businessman.

== Personal life and death ==
Todd married Winnefred Ketzeback on January 14, 1893. They had three children together. Todd's great-nephew Jerry Newton went on to serve in both chambers of the Minnesota Legislature.

During his tenure in the Minnesota Legislature, Todd resided in Wells, Minnesota. He was a Methodist Episcopal.

Todd was a member of the state lodge of the Odd Fellows. He served as state treasurer of the organization in 1927.

Todd died at the age of 61 in Wells, Minnesota on September 9, 1932.

Minnesota Senate
Preceded by Frank E. Putnam	Member of the Minnesota Senate from the 7th district 1931–1932	Succeeded by Daniel D. Murphy
