= Remember L. H. Lord =

American politician (1864–1938)

Remember L. H. Lord (April 7, 1864 – March 21, 1938) was an American businessman and politician.

Lord was born in Faribault County, Minnesota and lived in Wells, Minnesota with his wife and family. He went to the Wells public schools and graduated from Hamline University. Lord was involved with horticulture and the banking business. He also taught in rural schools, was a high school superintendent, and studied at the University of Minnesota Law School. Lord served on the Wells School Board. He served in the Minnesota House of Representatives from 1925 to 1928.
