= Blue Earth Municipal Airport =

- IATA: none; ICAO: KSBU; FAA LID: SBU

Summary
- Airport type: Public
- Owner: City of Blue Earth
- Serves: Blue Earth, Minnesota
- Elevation AMSL: 1,092.8 ft / 333.09 m
- Coordinates: 43°45′43.5953″N 094°05′34.3000″W

Map
- Location of airport in Minnesota/United States KSBU (the United States)

Runways
| Direction | Length | | Surface |
| Direction | ft | m | Surface |
|---|---|---|---|
| 16/34 | 3,400 x 75 | 1,036 x 23 | Concrete |
| 3/21 | 2,245 x 200 | 684 x 61 | Turf |

Blue Earth (ICAO: KSBU, FAA LID: SBU) is a city-owned public-use airport located three miles south of the city of Blue Earth, Minnesota in Faribault County.

== Facilities and aircraft ==
Blue Earth Airport contains two runways, one designated 16/34 with a 3,400 x 75 ft (1,036 x 23 m) asphalt surface,.and another designated 3/21 with a 2,245 x 200 ft (684 x 61 m) turf surface.

For the 12-month period ending September 30, 2017, the airport had 13,870 aircraft operations, an average of 38 per day: 54% general aviation and 46% transient general aviation. The airport housed 26 single-engine airplanes.

== See also ==
- List of airports in Minnesota
