= William Zakariasen =

American music critic and opera singer (1930–2004)

William Zakariasen (August 19, 1930 – September 4, 2004) was an American operatic tenor and music critic.

== Biography ==
Born in Blue Earth, Minnesota, Zakariasen began his career as a classical tenor in the late 1950s, appearing in operas and in concerts. He sometimes performed under the name William Saxon. In the early 1970s he moved away from performance into the field of journalism, establishing himself as a respected Manhattan-based music critic. In 1976 he became the chief classical-music critic of the New York Daily News where he worked for the next seventeen years. After leaving the New York Daily News in 1993 he became the classical-music/opera critic for The Westsider/Chelsea Clinton News in 1994. He remained in that position until his death in 2004 in New York City. Zakariasen was also a repeat contributor of articles to Opera News magazine and to New York Concert Review.
