= Faribault County Courthouse =

- U.S. National Register of Historic Places
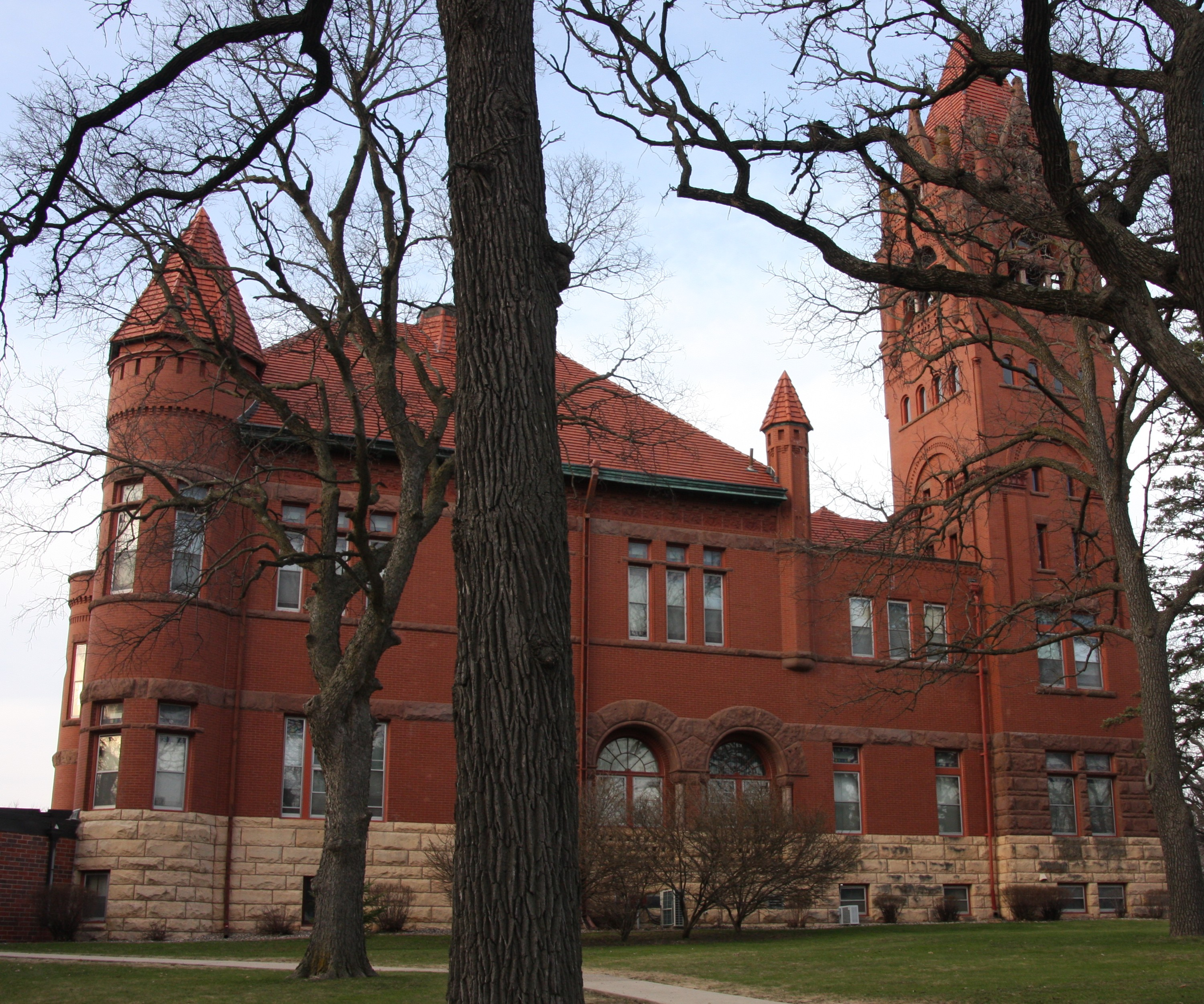
- Faribault County Courthouse

- Location within Minnesota Location within the United States
- Location: 415 N. Main; Blue Earth, Minnesota
- Coordinates: 43°38′32.59″N 94°6′10.61″W
- Built: 1891
- Architect: S.J. Hoban; C.S. Dunham
- Architectural style: Richardsonian Romanesque
- MPS: Faribault County MRA (AD)
- NRHP reference No.: 77000731
- Added to NRHP: April 11, 1977

The Faribault County Courthouse in Blue Earth, Minnesota, United States, is listed on the National Register of Historic Places. The building was completed in December 1892 at a cost of $70,000. Materials included Kasota limestone, sand from the Blue Earth River bottoms, red brick above the rusticated sandstone ground floor, and clay tile for the roof. The arches at the entrance rest on short columns with foliated capitals, a hallmark of the Richardsonian Romanesque style. Between the arches is a gargoyle in the form of a satyr's head. The most prominent feature is a seven-story tower on the corner.

A county office building wing was added to the west in 1974-75, designed in a modern style by A.J. Ross & Assoc.
