= David M. Carey =

American politician (1899–1963)

David M. Carey (January 29, 1889 – July 6, 1963) was an American veterinarian and farmer.

Carey was born in Mapleton, Blue Earth County, Minnesota and went to the Mapleton Public Schools. He went to business and agricultural schools. Carey graduated from Kansas City Veterinary College in 1914. He served in the United States Army Veterinary Corps during World War I and was commissioned a second lieutenant. He lived with his wife and family in Wells, Faribault County, Minnesota. Carey was a farmer and veterinarian. Carey served on the Wells School Board. He also served in the Minnesota Senate from 1945 to 1954.
