= Erik Simonson =

American politician

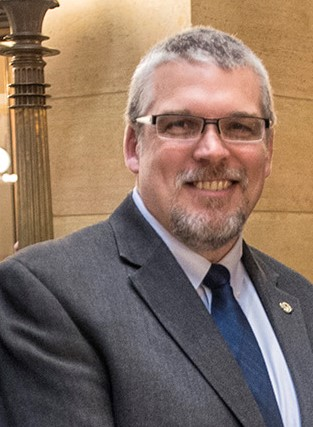

Member of the Minnesota Senate from the 7th district
- In office January 3, 2017 – January 4, 2021
- Preceded by: Roger Reinert
- Succeeded by: Jen McEwen

Member of the Minnesota House of Representatives from the 7B district
- In office January 8, 2013 – January 3, 2017
- Preceded by: redrawn district
- Succeeded by: Liz Olson

Personal details
- Born: May 26, 1968 (age 58) Duluth, Minnesota
- Party: Minnesota Democratic–Farmer–Labor Party
- Children: 2
- Education: College of St. Scholastica
- Occupation: firefighter, legislator

Erik Simonson (born May 26, 1968) is a Minnesota politician and former member of the Minnesota Senate. A member of the Minnesota Democratic–Farmer–Labor Party (DFL), he represented District 7 which includes the city of Duluth in St. Louis County in northeastern Minnesota.

== Early life ==
Simonson was born in Duluth, Minnesota.

== Minnesota legislature ==
Simonson was first elected to the Minnesota House of Representatives in 2012 representing District 7B and served two terms.

Simonson was then elected to the Minnesota Senate in 2016.

Simonson served on the following committees during his tenure:

- Ranking Minority Member Energy and Utilities Finance and Policy
- Environment and Natural Resources Finance
- Jobs and Economic Growth Finance and Policy

In 2020, Simonson was not endorsed by the DFL and was defeated in the primary election on August 11 to Jen McEwen.

== Personal life ==
Simonson was an assistant chief for the Duluth Fire Department, retiring after serving as a firefighter for 27 years. He is married and has two children.

After leaving his role as a legislator, Simonson became a lobbyist with Saint Paul-based law firm Flaherty and Hood.
