= Wells Municipal Airport (Minnesota) =

- IATA: none; ICAO: none; FAA LID: 68Y

Summary
- Airport type: Public
- Owner: City of Wells
- Serves: Wells, Minnesota
- Elevation AMSL: 1,119 ft / 341 m
- Coordinates: 43°44′30″N 093°46′38″W

Map
- Location of airport in Minnesota 68Y (the United States)

Runways
Direction	Length		Surface
Direction	ft	m	Surface
17/35	2,897	883	Turf

Statistics (2019)
- Aircraft operations (year ending 9/30/2019): 6,000
- Based aircraft: 8
- Source: Federal Aviation Administration

Wells Municipal Airport (FAA LID: 68Y) is a city-owned, public-use airport located three nautical miles (6 km) west of the central business district of Wells, a city in Faribault County, Minnesota, United States.

== Facilities and aircraft ==
Land was purchased in 1964 and the Wells Municipal Airport opened in August 1966.

Wells Municipal Airport covers an area of 45 acres (18 ha) at an elevation of 1,119 feet (341 m) above mean sea level. It has one runway designated 17/35 with a turf surface measuring 2,897 by 165 feet (883 x 50 m).

For the 12-month period ending September 30, 2019, the airport had 6,000 general aviation aircraft operations, an average of 115 per week. At that time there were eight aircraft based at this airport, all single-engine.

A North American F-86L, serial 53-0719, serves as a gate guard at the airport entrance.

== See also ==
- List of airports in Minnesota
