= Larry Buendorf =

American security officer (1937–2025)

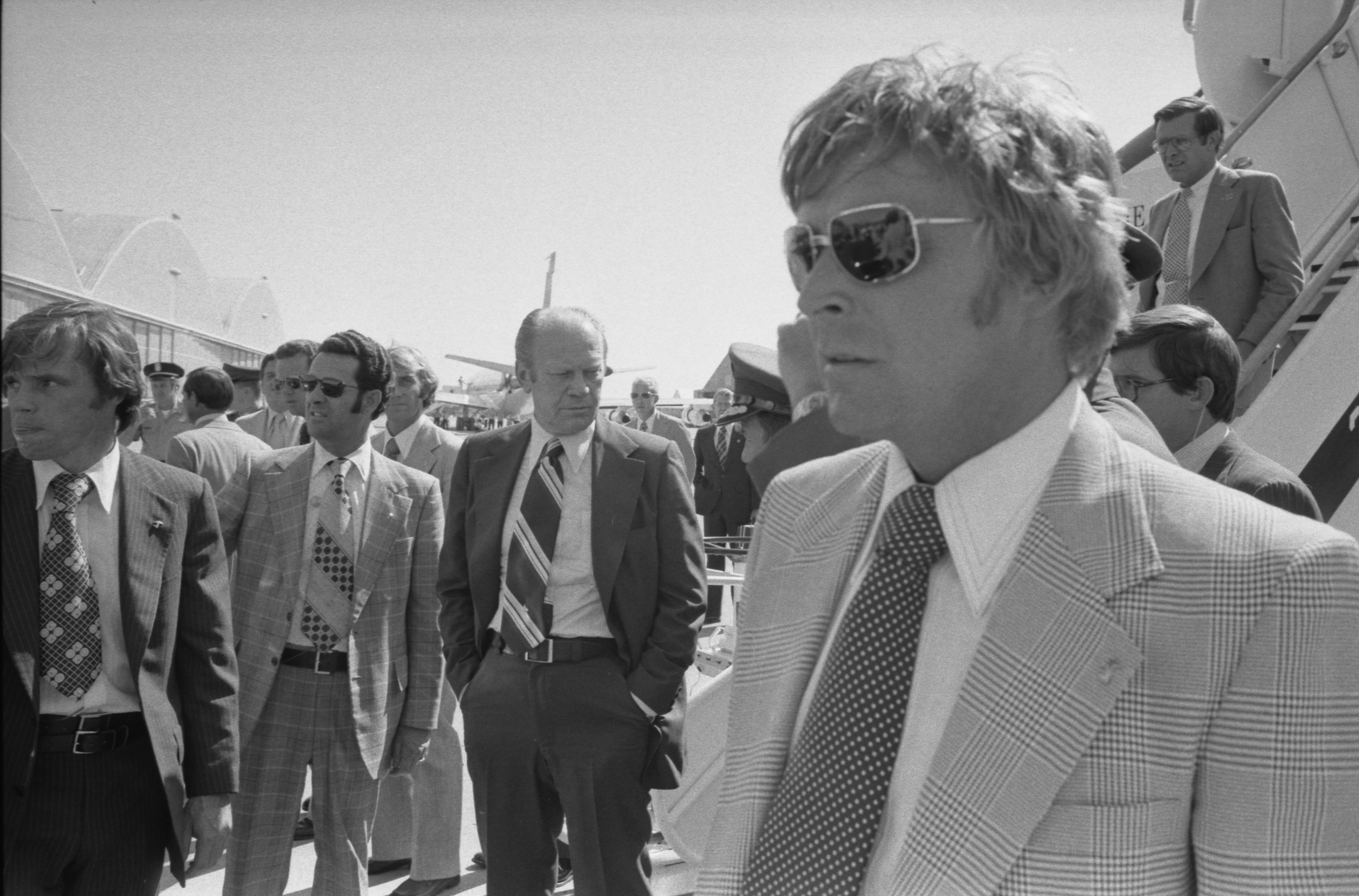
- Buendorf (in foreground, with sunglasses) protecting Ford on September 5, 1975, the day of the assassination attempt
- Born: Larry Merle Buendorf; November 18, 1937; Wells, Minnesota, U.S.
- Died: March 9, 2025 (aged 87); Colorado Springs, Colorado, U.S.
- Education: Minnesota State University, Mankato, B.S. 1959
- Occupations: Chief Security Officer of the U.S. Olympic Committee, Secret Service special agent

Larry Merle Buendorf (November 18, 1937 – March 9, 2025) was a United States Navy aviator and Secret Service agent. He served as Chief Security Officer of the United States Olympic Committee. Buendorf broke up an assassination attempt on United States President Gerald Ford in 1975.

== Early life and navy service ==
Buendorf was born in Wells, Minnesota, on November 18, 1937, as the son of Ruby and Merle Buendorf. He graduated from Wells High School in Minnesota in 1955. He received a Bachelor of Science degree in Business from Mankato State University in 1959. After service in the United States Navy as a Naval Aviator in the Vietnam War, he joined the Secret Service in 1970, where he was employed for 23 years.

== Secret Service career ==
Buendorf was assigned to the Secret Service's Chicago Field Office (1970–1972), Presidential Protective Division (1972–1977) and Denver Field Office (1977–1982). He was Special Agent in Charge, Omaha Field Office (1982–1983). Later, from 1983 to 1993, he was Special Agent in Charge of the Protective Division and, once again, assigned to protect President Gerald Ford and First Lady Betty Ford.

=== Assassination attempt on U.S. President Gerald Ford ===
On September 5, 1975, President Gerald Ford, who had just given a speech at the California State Capitol in Sacramento, walked across a park where a crowd had gathered. A woman in a red dress, who later was identified as Lynette "Squeaky" Fromme, was seen following Ford while he was shaking hands. While Fromme pointed the gun at Ford, several people heard a "metallic click" sound. As the red-robed Fromme shouted, "It wouldn't go off", Buendorf grabbed the gun, forced it from Fromme's hand, and brought her to the ground.

For his role in preventing the assassination attempt on President Ford, Buendorf was awarded the U.S. Treasury Meritorious Service Award and the United States Secret Service Valor Award.

Every year after the assassination attempt, Buendorf and Ford maintained telephone contact on the anniversary of the attack. He also visited Ford and skied with him on occasion.

== U.S. Olympic Committee ==
Buendorf later became Chief Security Officer of the United States Olympic Committee in 1993 after retirement from the Secret Service. From the Olympic Committee headquarters in Colorado Springs, his office is able to monitor security images from other Olympic training sites in Lake Placid, New York, and Chula Vista, California, a suburb of San Diego. The grounds of the Olympic Committee are open to the public and have a visitor center and gift shop. As Chief Security Officer, Buendorf was responsible for security of the U.S. Olympic Committee. However, he was not directly responsible for security at the Olympic Games when they were held in the United States in 1996 and 2002, as such tasks were performed by local, state, and federal government personnel, as well as contracted private security.

His philosophy for the Olympic Committee grounds security was "We don't want to create the environment of armed guards on the fence line." "That's not the kind of image we want for the Olympic movement. But we want it to be known there's a presence."

Buendorf retired from his position in 2018.

== Death ==
Buendorf died in Colorado Springs, Colorado, on March 9, 2025, at the age of 87.

== Other achievements ==
Buendorf was inducted into the Minnesota Athletic Hall of Fame.

== Acting credits ==
Buendorf appeared on the television documentary film Inside the U.S. Secret Service in 2004.
