= Wells station (Minnesota) =

Wells
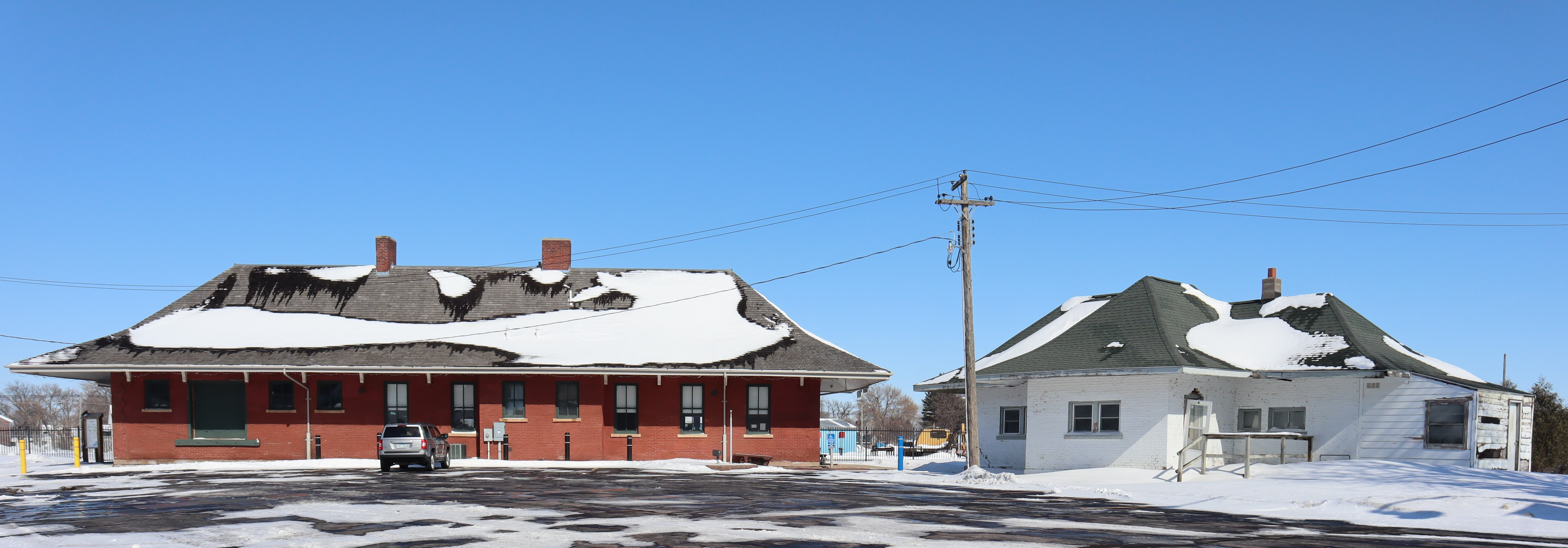
- The depot (left) and lunchroom (right) in early 2023.

General information
- Location: 100 First Avenue NW, Wells, Minnesota 56097
- System: Former Milwaukee Road passenger rail station

History
- Opened: 1869
- Rebuilt: 1903

Services
Preceding station	Milwaukee Road	Following station
Easton toward Wessington Springs	Wessington Springs – La Crosse	Baroda toward La Crosse
Terminus	Wells – Farmington	Minnesota Lake toward Farmington
- Chicago, Milwaukee, St. Paul and Pacific Railroad Depot and Lunchroom
- U.S. National Register of Historic Places
- Location within Minnesota
- Location: Corner of 1st St NW and 1st Ave NW; Wells, Minnesota
- Coordinates: 43°44′46″N 93°43′36″W
- Built: 1903
- Architectural style: Vernacular
- MPS: Faribault MRA
- NRHP reference No.: 80004263
- Added to NRHP: May 23, 1980
Location

The Chicago, Milwaukee, St. Paul and Pacific Railroad Depot and Lunchroom are two buildings located in Wells, Minnesota, and built by the Chicago, Milwaukee, St. Paul and Pacific Railroad (otherwise known as The Milwaukee Road) in 1903.

The town of Wells was platted by a precursor to The Milwaukee Road in 1869. As the town grew, it became a junction, with one branch of the railroad continuing west toward Sioux Falls, South Dakota and a second branch going north toward Farmington, Minnesota. The railroad placed a railyard at Wells. In 1903, as railroad operations expanded, The Milwaukee Road built the present station out of brick. It also built the lunchroom (or "beanery") to serve the train crews as well as passengers and the town. The lunchroom was also built of brick and is located adjacent to the depot.

The depot is a single-story, rectangular building with a passenger waiting area on one end and a freight room on the other. The agent's office was located between the two. The lunchroom is also a single-story, rectangular building. It was altered from its original appearance with the addition of a wood-frame room and garage. The lunchroom would have had a kitchen and dining area; however, at the time of nomination to the National Register of Historic Places, the lunchroom had already been sold to private individuals who converted it into a residence.

The depot served freight trains and mixed trains (combining both passengers and freight) as an office for the train crews and passenger ticket and waiting area. In the 1960s, as passenger service was terminated, the depot continued to serve the rail yard as an office.

After The Milwaukee Road went bankrupt and was sold to the Soo Line Railroad in 1985, the depot continued to be used. The Soo Line then sold this rail line to the Iowa, Chicago and Eastern Railroad (IC&E) (a subsidiary of the Dakota, Minnesota and Eastern Railroad). The IC&E continued to use the depot for its train crews until 2005, when it built new offices on the opposite side of the tracks.

In 2007, the Dakota, Minnesota and Eastern was merged into the Canadian Pacific Railway (CPR). The CPR planned to close the depot and demolish it as surplus. Instead the CPR sold the depot to the Wells Historical Society for a nominal sum. The Society restored the depot and opened it as a museum in 2010.

The depot and lunchroom were listed in the National Register due to their association with the development of the town of Wells and also for their association with the development of railroads in Minnesota.
