= John M. Patton (Minnesota politician) =

American politician and businessman

John M. Patton (March 22, 1928 – November 12, 2010) was an American politician and businessman.

Patton was born in Huron, South Dakota. He graduated from Waseca High School in Waseca, Minnesota in 1945. Patton graduated from Washington University in St. Louis in 1949. He served in the United States Air Force from 1950 to 1953 and was commissioned a second lieutenant. Patton also went to University of Minnesota Mortuary Science. He moved to Blue Earth, Minnesota in 1963, with his wife and family, and was the owner of the Patton Funeral Home. Patton served in the Minnesota Senate from 1973 to 1976 and as mayor of Blue Earth from 1978 to 1983. He was a Republican. Patton died at his home in Blue Earth, Minnesota.
