= Eric Oren =

American businessman and politician

Eric Oren (February 11, 1868 – July 11, 1937) was an American businessman and politician.

Oren emigrated to the United States from Norway and settled in Wells, Faribault County, Minnesota with his wife and family. He was involved with the banking and railroad businesses and was a merchant and photographer. Oren served in the Minnesota House of Representatives from 1919 to 1924. He also served as the mayor and clerk of Wells, Minnesota. Oren also served on the Wells School Board.
