= Frank E. Putnam =

American lawyer and politician

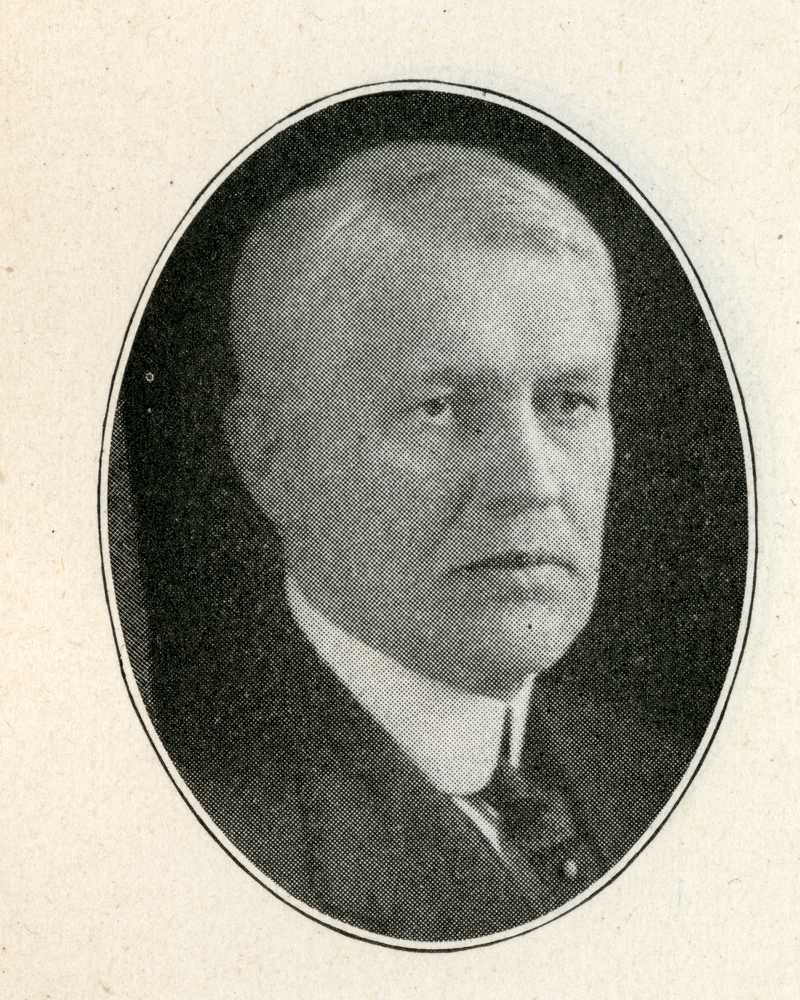

Member of the Minnesota Senate from the 7th district
- In office January 5, 1915 – January 5, 1931
- Preceded by: Fremont Jackson Thoe
- Succeeded by: Charles Leonard Todd

Member of the Minnesota Senate from the 12th district
- In office January 6, 1903 – January 4, 1915
- Preceded by: George D. McArthur
- Succeeded by: John Steffen

Personal details
- Born: January 9, 1857 Grafton, Vermont
- Died: July 6, 1944 (aged 87) Blue Earth, Minnesota

Frank E. Putnam (January 9, 1857 – July 6, 1944) was an American lawyer and politician.

Putnam was born in Grafton, Vermont and graduated from Vermont Academy. He went to the University of Michigan Law School, in 1884, and was admitted to the Minnesota bar in 1885. Putnam lived in Blue Earth, Faribault County, Minnesota, with his wife and family and practiced law in Blue Earth. He served as the Blue Earth City Attorney and as the Faribault County Attorney. Putnam served in the Minnesota Senate from 1903 to 1930 and was a Republican. He also served as president of the Minnesota State Bar Association in 1926 and 1927. Putnam died in Blue Earth.
