= Wells, Minnesota =

City in Minnesota, United States

Wells
- City
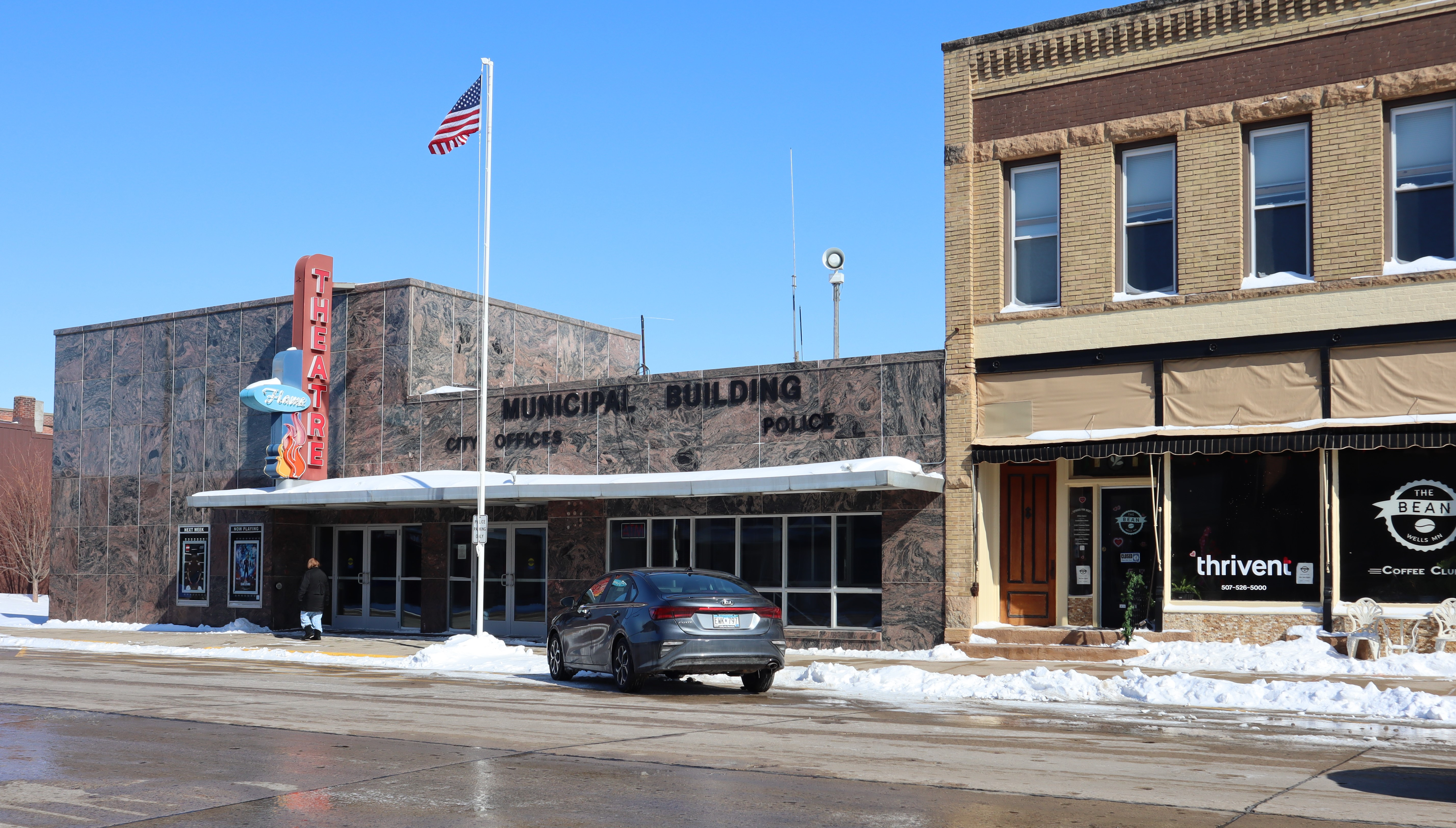
- Wells Municipal Building in 2023

- Location of Wells, Minnesota
- Coordinates: 43°44′37″N 93°44′01″W
- Country: United States
- State: Minnesota
- County: Faribault
- Established: =

Government
  - Type: Mayor – Council
  - Mayor: David Braun

Area
  - Total: 2.24 sq mi (5.79 km^{2})
  - Land: 2.09 sq mi (5.41 km^{2})
  - Water: 0.15 sq mi (0.38 km^{2})
- Elevation: 1,135 ft (346 m)

Population (2020)
  - Total: 2,410
  - Density: 1,153/sq mi (445.3/km^{2})
- Time zone: UTC-6 (Central (CST))
  - Summer (DST): UTC-5 (CDT)
- ZIP code: 56097
- Area code: 507
- FIPS code: 27-69106
- GNIS feature ID: 2397249
- Website: https://cityofwellsmn.gov/

Wells is a city in Faribault County, Minnesota, United States. The population was 2,410 at the 2020 census.

== History ==
Wells was laid out in 1869. The city was named for J.W. Wells, father in law of Clark W. Thompson.

The city contains a property listed on the National Register of Historic Places: the former Chicago, Milwaukee, St. Paul and Pacific Depot and Lunchroom.

== Geography ==
According to the United States Census Bureau, the city has a total area of 1.99 square miles (5.15 km^{2}), all land.

Minnesota State Highways 22 and 109 are two of the main routes in the city. Interstate 90 is located six miles south of Wells on Highway 22.

=== Climate ===
Climate data for Wells, Minnesota, 1991–2020 normals, extremes 1968–present
Month	Jan	Feb	Mar	Apr	May	Jun	Jul	Aug	Sep	Oct	Nov	Dec	Year
Record high °F (°C)	58 (14)	61 (16)	80 (27)	90 (32)	101 (38)	99 (37)	100 (38)	98 (37)	97 (36)	93 (34)	80 (27)	68 (20)	101 (38)
Mean maximum °F (°C)	44.1 (6.7)	48.0 (8.9)	65.8 (18.8)	80.1 (26.7)	88.7 (31.5)	93.1 (33.9)	92.6 (33.7)	90.4 (32.4)	88.9 (31.6)	82.1 (27.8)	66.1 (18.9)	48.1 (8.9)	95.4 (35.2)
Mean daily maximum °F (°C)	23.9 (−4.5)	28.6 (−1.9)	41.0 (5.0)	56.2 (13.4)	68.9 (20.5)	78.9 (26.1)	82.2 (27.9)	79.5 (26.4)	73.5 (23.1)	59.7 (15.4)	43.1 (6.2)	29.4 (−1.4)	55.4 (13.0)
Daily mean °F (°C)	14.3 (−9.8)	19.1 (−7.2)	32.1 (0.1)	45.6 (7.6)	58.4 (14.7)	68.8 (20.4)	72.0 (22.2)	69.6 (20.9)	62.4 (16.9)	48.6 (9.2)	33.8 (1.0)	20.8 (−6.2)	45.5 (7.5)
Mean daily minimum °F (°C)	4.6 (−15.2)	9.7 (−12.4)	23.1 (−4.9)	35.0 (1.7)	47.9 (8.8)	58.7 (14.8)	61.8 (16.6)	59.6 (15.3)	51.3 (10.7)	37.6 (3.1)	24.4 (−4.2)	12.2 (−11.0)	35.5 (1.9)
Mean minimum °F (°C)	−17.9 (−27.7)	−12.4 (−24.7)	−1.2 (−18.4)	17.8 (−7.9)	33.0 (0.6)	44.9 (7.2)	50.6 (10.3)	48.0 (8.9)	34.6 (1.4)	21.2 (−6.0)	5.4 (−14.8)	−10.8 (−23.8)	−20.3 (−29.1)
Record low °F (°C)	−32 (−36)	−31 (−35)	−22 (−30)	1 (−17)	24 (−4)	34 (1)	45 (7)	38 (3)	27 (−3)	11 (−12)	−16 (−27)	−27 (−33)	−32 (−36)
Average precipitation inches (mm)	0.71 (18)	0.73 (19)	1.65 (42)	3.39 (86)	4.60 (117)	5.45 (138)	4.86 (123)	4.13 (105)	3.72 (94)	2.50 (64)	1.66 (42)	1.11 (28)	34.51 (876)
Average snowfall inches (cm)	8.5 (22)	8.6 (22)	5.8 (15)	2.9 (7.4)	0.4 (1.0)	0.0 (0.0)	0.0 (0.0)	0.0 (0.0)	0.0 (0.0)	0.4 (1.0)	2.6 (6.6)	10.9 (28)	40.1 (103)
Average precipitation days (≥ 0.01 in)	6.7	5.5	6.8	11.0	13.2	11.7	10.2	9.9	8.9	8.8	5.7	7.7	106.1
Average snowy days (≥ 0.1 in)	5.4	4.3	2.9	1.2	0.0	0.0	0.0	0.0	0.0	0.4	1.7	5.5	21.4
Source 1: NOAA
Source 2: National Weather Service

== Demographics ==
Historical population
Census	Pop.	Note	%±
1880	661		—
1890	1,208		82.8%
1900	2,017		67.0%
1910	1,755		−13.0%
1920	1,894		7.9%
1930	1,795		−5.2%
1940	2,127		18.5%
1950	2,475		16.4%
1960	2,897		17.1%
1970	2,791		−3.7%
1980	2,777		−0.5%
1990	2,465		−11.2%
2000	2,494		1.2%
2010	2,343		−6.1%
2020	2,410		2.9%
U.S. Decennial Census

=== 2020 census ===
As of the 2020 census, Wells had a population of 2,410. The median age was 41.8 years. 24.5% of residents were under the age of 18 and 22.9% of residents were 65 years of age or older. For every 100 females there were 93.0 males, and for every 100 females age 18 and over there were 93.7 males age 18 and over.

0.0% of residents lived in urban areas, while 100.0% lived in rural areas.

There were 1,017 households in Wells, of which 28.7% had children under the age of 18 living in them. Of all households, 45.0% were married-couple households, 19.3% were households with a male householder and no spouse or partner present, and 28.1% were households with a female householder and no spouse or partner present. About 31.8% of all households were made up of individuals and 16.4% had someone living alone who was 65 years of age or older.

There were 1,119 housing units, of which 9.1% were vacant. The homeowner vacancy rate was 3.1% and the rental vacancy rate was 10.2%.

Racial composition as of the 2020 census
Race	Number	Percent
White	2,131	88.4%
Black or African American	10	0.4%
American Indian and Alaska Native	11	0.5%
Asian	18	0.7%
Native Hawaiian and Other Pacific Islander	0	0.0%
Some other race	105	4.4%
Two or more races	135	5.6%
Hispanic or Latino (of any race)	254	10.5%

=== 2010 census ===
As of the census of 2010, there were 2,343 people, 1,013 households, and 635 families living in the city. The population density was 1,177.4 inhabitants per square mile (454.6/km^{2}). There were 1,133 housing units at an average density of 569.3 per square mile (219.8/km^{2}). The racial makeup of the city was 96.9% White, 0.2% African American, 0.2% Native American, 0.8% Asian, 0.9% from other races, and 1.1% from two or more races. Hispanic or Latino of any race were 7.3% of the population.

There were 1,013 households, of which 27.3% had children under the age of 18 living with them, 48.7% were married couples living together, 10.0% had a female householder with no husband present, 4.0% had a male householder with no wife present, and 37.3% were non-families. 33.9% of all households were made up of individuals, and 18.7% had someone living alone who was 65 years of age or older. The average household size was 2.26 and the average family size was 2.87.

The median age in the city was 45.3 years. 22.6% of residents were under the age of 18; 6.2% were between the ages of 18 and 24; 20.8% were from 25 to 44; 27.6% were from 45 to 64; and 22.6% were 65 years of age or older. The gender makeup of the city was 47.9% male and 52.1% female.

=== 2000 census ===
As of the census of 2000, there were 2,494 people, 1,032 households, and 665 families living in the city. The population density was 1,846.5 inhabitants per square mile (712.9/km^{2}). There were 1,097 housing units at an average density of 812.2 per square mile (313.6/km^{2}). The racial makeup of the city was 96.31% White, 0.04% African American, 0.16% Native American, 0.68% Asian, 0.00% Pacific Islander, 2.17% from other races, and 0.64% from two or more races. 4.73% of the population were Hispanic or Latino of any race.

There were 1,032 households, out of which 28.3% had children under the age of 18 living with them, 53.1% were married couples living together, 7.8% had a female householder with no husband present, and 35.5% were non-families. 32.2% of all households were made up of individuals, and 19.7% had someone living alone who was 65 years of age or older. The average household size was 2.33 and the average family size was 2.94.

In the city, the population was spread out, with 23.3% under the age of 18, 7.3% from 18 to 24, 22.1% from 25 to 44, 21.3% from 45 to 64, and 26.0% who were 65 years of age or older. The median age was 43 years. For every 100 females, there were 87.5 males. For every 100 females age 18 and over, there were 82.6 males.

The median income for a household in the city was $26,463, and the median income for a family was $38,523. Males had a median income of $27,969 versus $19,873 for females. The per capita income for the city was $15,614. 9.8% of the population and 5.9% of families were below the poverty line. 7.4% of those under the age of 18 and 15.1% of those 65 and older were living below the poverty line.

== Transportation ==
Land was purchased in 1964 to build an airport. The Wells Municipal Airport opened in August 1966.

== Notable people ==
- Larry Buendorf, US Secret Service agent who subdued Squeaky Fromme.
- David M. Carey, Veterinarian and Minnesota state senator
- Remember L. H. Lord, businessman and Minnesota state legislator
- Eric Oren, Minnesota state legislator and businessman
- Charles Leonard Todd, Minnesota state senator, farmer, and businessman
- Frederic Warde, printer, type and book designer.
