= Jen McEwen =

American politician

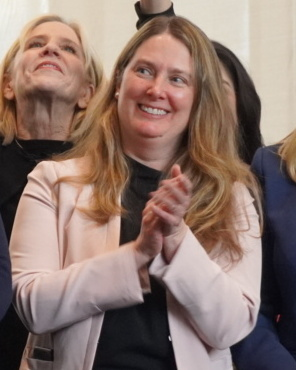

Member of the Minnesota Senate
- Incumbent
- Assumed office January 5, 2021
- Preceded by: Erik Simonson
- Constituency: 7th district (2021–2023); 8th district (2023–present)

Personal details
- Born: May 14, 1977 (age 49) Carbondale, Illinois, U.S.
- Party: Democratic (DFL)
- Other political affiliations: Democratic Socialists of America (Note: Democratic Socialists of America is not a registered political party, instead, it is a political organization for those with democratic socialist ideology.)
- Education: University of Maine; Hamline University School of Law
- Profession: Attorney

Jennifer A. McEwen (/məˈkjuːɪn/ mə-KEW-in; born May 14, 1977) is a Minnesota politician and member of the Minnesota Senate. A member of the Democratic-Farmer-Labor Party (DFL), she represents Senate District 8, which includes the city of Duluth in St. Louis County. From 2021 to 2023, she represented Minnesota's 7th Senate District.

== Early life, education, and career ==
McEwen is a Duluth native who had received her B.A. from the University of Maine. She then attended the Hamline University School of Law, earning a J.D. She became an attorney for disabled workers and board president of the Damiano Center, where she has worked with families struggling with food security. McEwen was also previously a public defender. She has two children.

== Minnesota State Senate ==
In 2020, McEwen challenged incumbent Senator Erik Simonson for the DFL endorsement in District 7. She won the endorsement and the primary, with 77% of the vote. She then won the general election against Republican nominee Donna Bergstrom, a second-time candidate who ran against Simonson in 2016, with just over 68% of the vote. McEwen was reelected in 2022. She is a member of the Democratic Socialists of America (DSA).

In the 93rd Minnesota Legislature, as chair of the Labor Committee, McEwen oversaw reforms that required paid sick leave for all employees and banned non-compete agreements. She authored a bill to increase the liability of contractors for wage theft. She also wrote and sponsored the Protect Reproductive Options Act, which protects abortion rights in Minnesota, after Roe v. Wade was overturned in 2022. McEwen authored and supported legislation to reestablish passenger rail service between the Twin Cities and Duluth, the Northern Lights Express. In addition, she was the primary sponsor of a bill to provide $240 million to replace lead service lines across Minnesota, which passed and was signed into law in May 2023.

== See also ==
- List of Democratic Socialists of America who have held office in the United States
