= Blue Earth, Minnesota =

City in Minnesota, United States

Blue Earth
- City
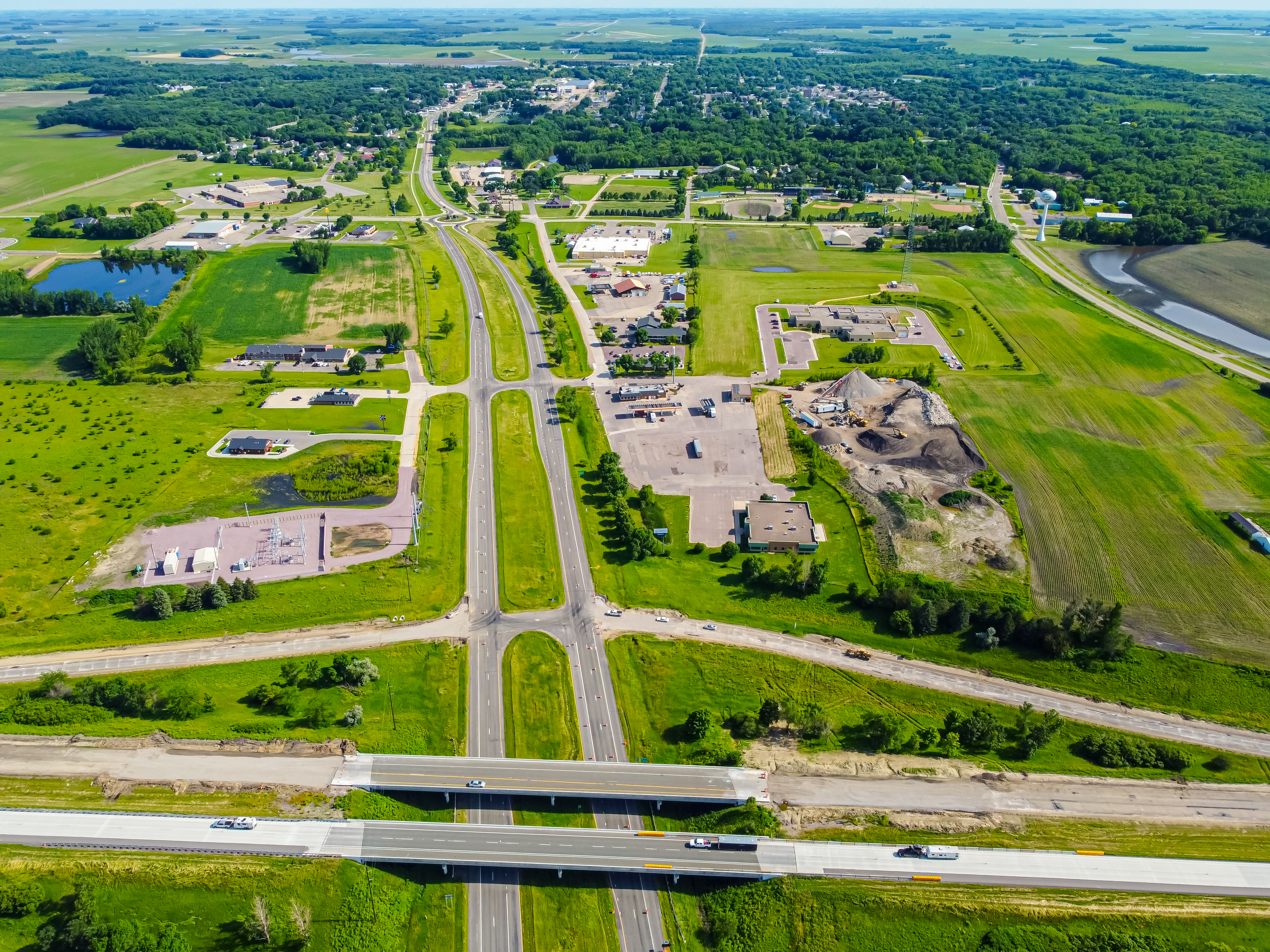
- I-90 and US-169 junction north of town

- Logo
- Etymology: Blue Earth River
- Nickname: Beyond the Valley of the Jolly Green Giant
- Motto: Earth so rich the city grows!
- Location of the city of Blue Earth within Faribault County and state of Minnesota
- Coordinates: 43°38′25″N 94°05′55″W
- Country: United States
- State: Minnesota
- County: Faribault
- Established: 1856

Government
  - Type: Mayor – Council
  - Mayor: Rick Scholtes

Area
  - Total: 3.41 sq mi (8.84 km^{2})
  - Land: 3.32 sq mi (8.59 km^{2})
  - Water: 0.093 sq mi (0.24 km^{2})
- Elevation: 1,076 ft (328 m)

Population (2020)
  - Total: 3,174
  - Estimate (2021): 3,248
  - Density: 956.5/sq mi (369.29/km^{2})
- Time zone: UTC-6 (CST)
  - Summer (DST): UTC-5 (CDT)
- ZIP code: 56013
- Area code: 507
- FIPS code: 27-06688
- GNIS feature ID: 2394200
- Website: becity.org

Blue Earth is a city in Faribault County, Minnesota, United States, at the confluence of the east and west branches of the Blue Earth River. The population was 3,174 at the 2020 census. It is the county seat of Faribault County. It is home to a statue of the Jolly Green Giant. Additionally, Interstate 90 is centered on Blue Earth, as the east and west construction teams met here in 1978. As a tribute, there is a golden stripe of concrete on the interstate near Blue Earth. This draws an analogy to the golden spike set in the first transcontinental railroad. Approximately three miles south of Blue Earth is the Blue Earth Municipal Airport.

== History ==
Blue Earth was platted in 1856. The city took its name from the Blue Earth River which surrounds the town. The river was given the Dakota language name makȟátȟo (meaning "blue earth") for the blue-green clay found in the river banks, from the phrase makato osa watapa: "the river where blue earth is gathered".

A post office has been in operation at Blue Earth since 1856.

The city celebrated its sesquicentennial in the summer of 2006 with community events, including a concert headlined by Peter Noone of Herman's Hermits.

== Attractions and community achievements ==
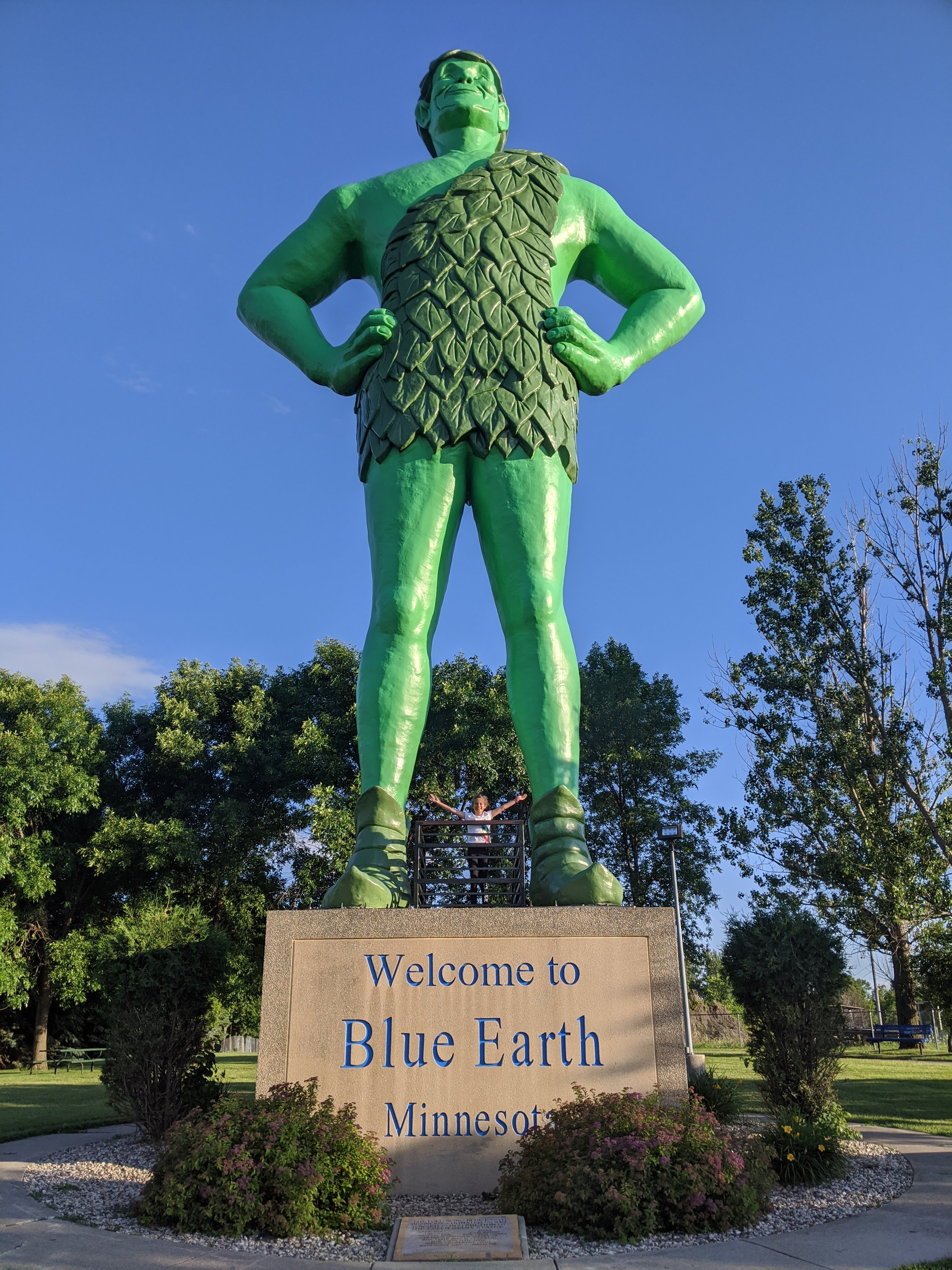
The Jolly Green Giant statue is 55.5' (17 m) tall

The Jolly Green Giant statue attracts over 14,000 visitors a year. In July 2007, the Blue Earth City Council approved space for a Green Giant memorabilia museum. In 2018 a building was built across from the Giant statue to house the museum, the Chamber and tourism offices, and the building is also the welcome center. Lowell Steen, of Blue Earth, has collected thousands of Green Giant items and will permanently loan them to the museum.

Steinberg Nature Park is a 33-acre (13.35 ha) park located east of Blue Earth on County Road 16. The park has a half-mile (0.8 km) trail and a picnic shelter.

Prior to football playoffs the Minneapolis Star Tribune had a Coaches Poll who voted each week for the Best Football Team in the State. In 1964, 1965 and 1966, the Blue Earth Area High School Bucs were rated #1 for 3 consecutive years holding many of their opponents to negative total yards. In 1972, the football team went 9-1 and played in the first state football playoffs and lost. The 1990 football team finished third in Minnesota for Class A. On November 24, 2012, the 2012 football team won the division 3A championship by defeating Rochester Lourdes High School by a score of 30–7.

The Blue Earth Bucs high school wrestling program has the second-most individual state champions on record in Minnesota with 50.

On Sept. 10–12, 1999, The Order of the Arrow (OA), a group within the Boy Scouts of America, held its Section C-1A Conclave in Blue Earth. Seven OA Lodges, representing councils from Iowa, Minnesota, North Dakota and South Dakota, attended the event.

== Architecture ==
Blue Earth is home to many examples of Midwestern architecture, including:

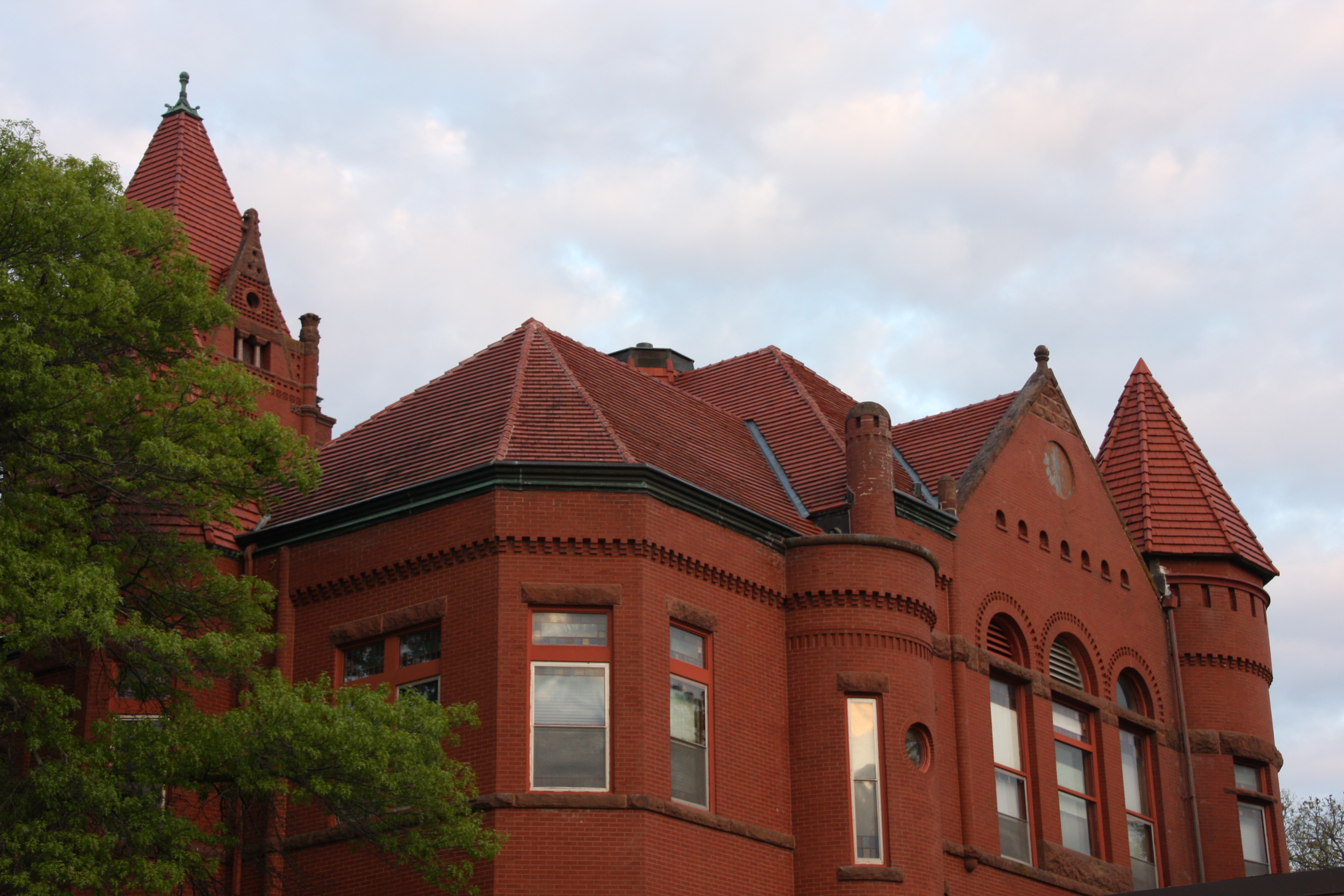
Faribault County Courthouse

Faribault County Courthouse – completed in December 1892 at a cost of over $70,000. The architect for the courthouse was C.A. Dunham of Burlington, Iowa and the contractor was S.J. Hoban from St. Paul. The style of the courthouse is Richardsonian Romanesque. Stone used in the construction of the courthouse was transported from Kasota, Minnesota to Blue Earth by horse and wagon and rail. Most of the sand used in the mortar was from the Blue Earth river bottom and thoroughly washed. The pillars on the front of the building are of polished granite. There are ledges on all four sides of the tower that are of solid stone of unknown weights of several ton each.

Episcopal Church of the Good Shepherd – 1872

First Presbyterian Church — constructed in 1897 at a cost of $12,622.75. Designed by Kinney and Orth, architects from Austin, Minnesota. The architecture is Romanesque Revival in the arched windows, Gothic Revival in the steeples and gables, and medieval in the towers.

Salem Evangelical Church – This English country Gothic structure was completed in 1942. Designed by Bard & Vanderbilt of Minneapolis, Minnesota.

== Geography ==
According to the United States Census Bureau, the city has a total area of 3.36 square miles (8.70 km^{2}), of which 3.27 square miles (8.47 km^{2}) is land and 0.09 square miles (0.23 km^{2}) is water.

Interstate 90 and U.S. Route 169 are two of the main routes in the city.

== Demographics ==
Historical population
Census	Pop.	Note	%±
1880	1,066		—
1890	1,569		47.2%
1900	2,900		84.8%
1910	2,319		−20.0%
1920	2,568		10.7%
1930	2,884		12.3%
1940	3,702		28.4%
1950	3,843		3.8%
1960	4,200		9.3%
1970	3,965		−5.6%
1980	4,132		4.2%
1990	3,745		−9.4%
2000	3,621		−3.3%
2010	3,353		−7.4%
2020	3,174		−5.3%
2021 (est.)	3,248		2.3%
U.S. Decennial Census; 2020 Census

=== 2020 census ===
As of the 2020 census, Blue Earth had a population of 3,174. The median age was 46.9 years. 20.3% of residents were under the age of 18 and 27.1% of residents were 65 years of age or older. For every 100 females there were 91.2 males, and for every 100 females age 18 and over there were 87.3 males age 18 and over.

0.0% of residents lived in urban areas, while 100.0% lived in rural areas.

There were 1,442 households in Blue Earth, of which 22.8% had children under the age of 18 living in them. Of all households, 40.9% were married-couple households, 18.9% were households with a male householder and no spouse or partner present, and 32.7% were households with a female householder and no spouse or partner present. About 38.8% of all households were made up of individuals and 21.6% had someone living alone who was 65 years of age or older.

There were 1,622 housing units, of which 11.1% were vacant. The homeowner vacancy rate was 2.0% and the rental vacancy rate was 8.6%.

Racial composition as of the 2020 census
Race	Number	Percent
White	2,844	89.6%
Black or African American	20	0.6%
American Indian and Alaska Native	37	1.2%
Asian	11	0.3%
Native Hawaiian and Other Pacific Islander	0	0.0%
Some other race	113	3.6%
Two or more races	149	4.7%
Hispanic or Latino (of any race)	327	10.3%

=== 2010 census ===
As of the census of 2010, there were 3,353 people, 1,453 households, and 888 families residing in the city. The population density was 1,025.4 inhabitants per square mile (395.9/km^{2}). There were 1,638 housing units at an average density of 500.9 per square mile (193.4/km^{2}). The racial makeup of the city was 96.0% White, 0.1% African American, 0.6% Native American, 0.2% Asian, 2.1% from other races, and 0.9% from two or more races. Hispanic or Latino of any race were 6.9% of the population.

There were 1,453 households, of which 25.7% had children under the age of 18 living with them, 48.0% were married couples living together, 9.9% had a female householder with no husband present, 3.2% had a male householder with no wife present, and 38.9% were non-families. 35.5% of all households were made up of individuals, and 20% had someone living alone who was 65 years of age or older. The average household size was 2.19 and the average family size was 2.81.

The median age in the city was 46.4 years. 21.4% of residents were under the age of 18; 6.9% were between the ages of 18 and 24; 20.4% were from 25 to 44; 26.7% were from 45 to 64; and 24.7% were 65 years of age or older. The gender makeup of the city was 46.8% male and 53.2% female.

=== 2000 census ===
As of the census of 2000, there were 3,621 people, 1,535 households, and 925 families residing in the city. The population density was 1,137.0 inhabitants per square mile (439.0/km^{2}). There were 1,666 housing units at an average density of 523.1 per square mile (202.0/km^{2}). The racial makeup of the city was 96.85% White, 0.17% African American, 0.06% Native American, 0.33% Asian, 0.19% Pacific Islander, 1.60% from other races, and 0.80% from two or more races. Hispanic or Latino of any race were 4.14% of the population.

There were 1,535 households, out of which 27.6% had children under the age of 18 living with them, 49.8% were married couples living together, 7.9% had a female householder with no husband present, and 39.7% were non-families. 36.3% of all households were made up of individuals, and 20.7% had someone living alone who was 65 years of age or older. The average household size was 2.23 and the average family size was 2.92.

In the city, the population was spread out, with 23.1% under the age of 18, 6.5% from 18 to 24, 21.9% from 25 to 44, 22.7% from 45 to 64, and 25.8% who were 65 years of age or older. The median age was 44 years. For every 100 females, there were 84.3 males. For every 100 females age 18 and over, there were 78.4 males.

The median income for a household in the city was $34,940, and the median income for a family was $42,377. Males had a median income of $29,359 versus $20,168 for females. The per capita income for the city was $18,037. About 4.3% of families and 8.0% of the population were below the poverty line, including 9.1% of those under age 18 and 10.1% of those age 65 or over.

== Notable people ==
- Donald Deskey, Industrial and interior designer
- Arlen Erdahl, Minnesota politician
- Geri Evans, Minnesota state legislator
- Jim Hagedorn, Congressman
- Tom Hagedorn, Congressman
- Daniel D. Murphy, Minnesota state legislator
- John M. Patton. Minnesota state legislator
- Pat Piper, Minnesota state legislator
- Frank E. Putnam, Minnesota state legislator
- Georgette Valle, Washington state legislator
- William Zakariasen, Music critic for the New York Daily News

== In popular culture ==
Blue Earth is mentioned in The Jayhawks song "She's Not Alone Anymore," from the 1989 album Blue Earth, in which the narrator says they "hitchhiked back from Blue Earth."

Blue Earth, Minnesota, was mentioned in CNN's "That's Random" segment of the network's CNN10 production which aired on November 29, 2017.

Petoskey's Sports Bar, a Midwest-themed bar in Seattle, Washington, features a vegetable pizza on their menu named after Blue Earth, Minnesota, because of the town's association with agriculture and the Jolly Green Giant.

A former funeral home in the town was featured on HGTV's Ugliest House in America special event on January 3, 2022.

The Jolly Green Giant was featured in promotions for Season 45 of Survivor (American TV series) on CBS. The Giant wore a giant red "Buff" bandana in the weeks leading up to the season premiere, similar to what contestants wear on the show.

== Gallery ==
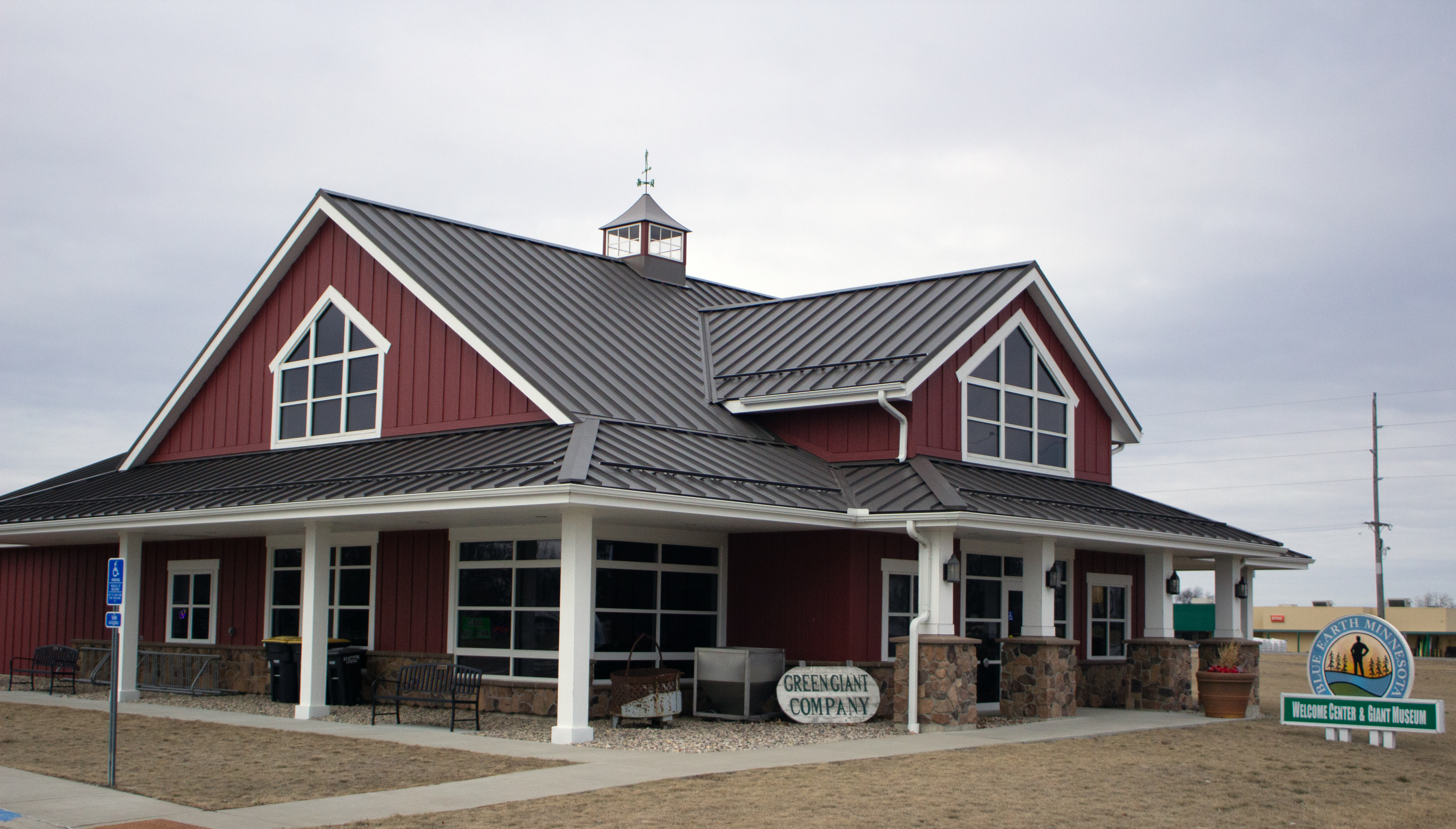
Green Giant Museum

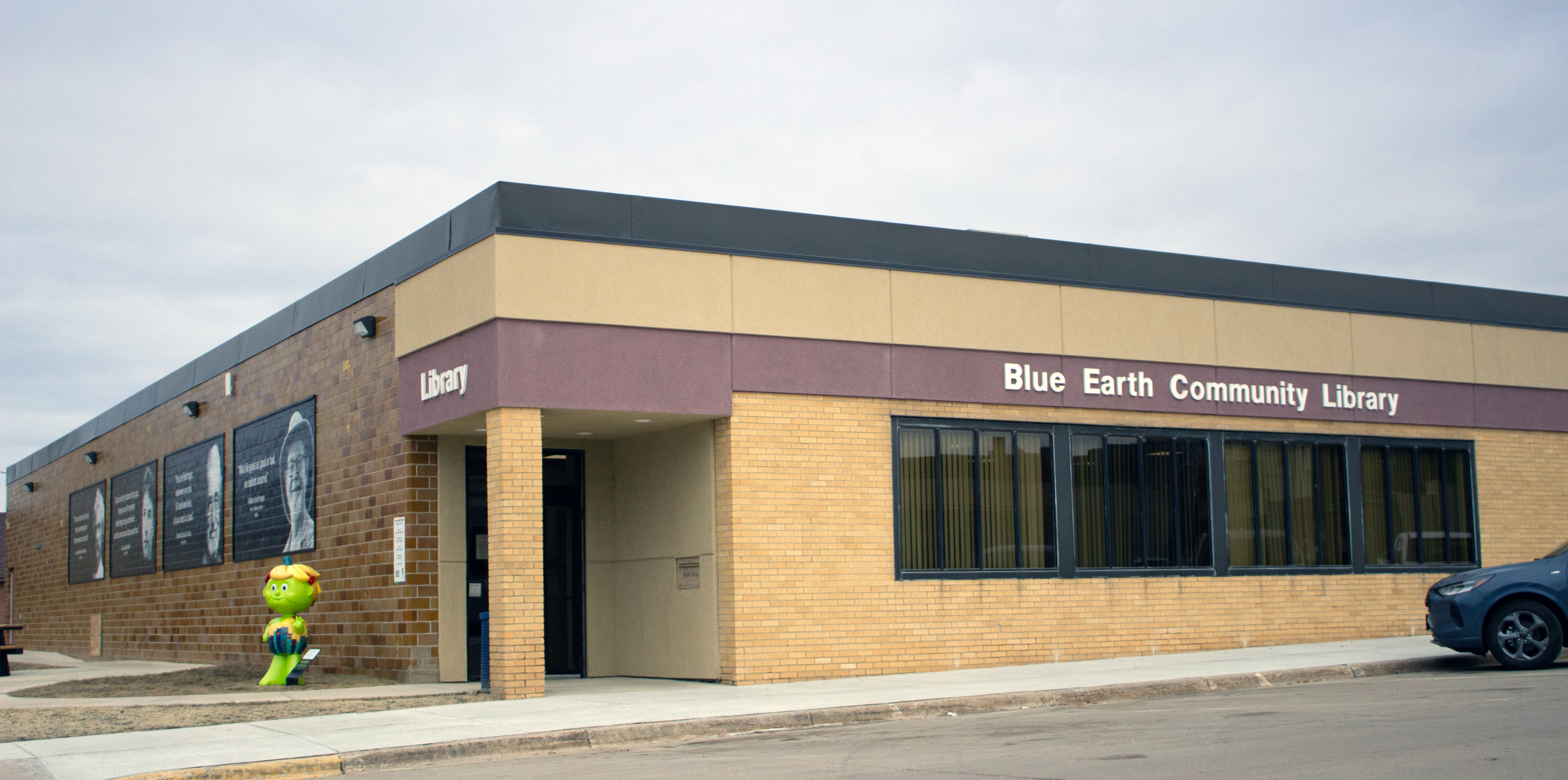
Community Library

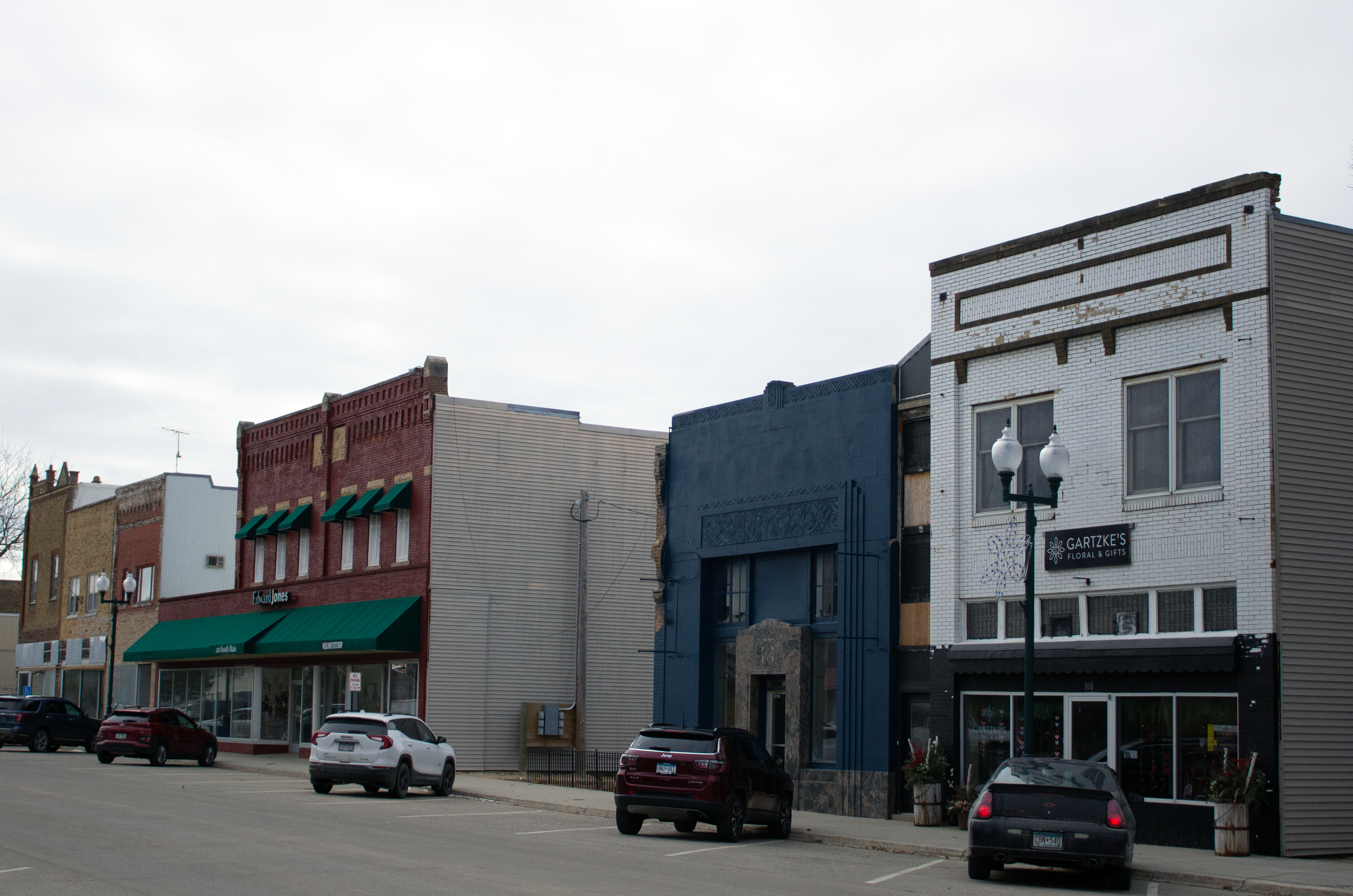
Commercial storefronts

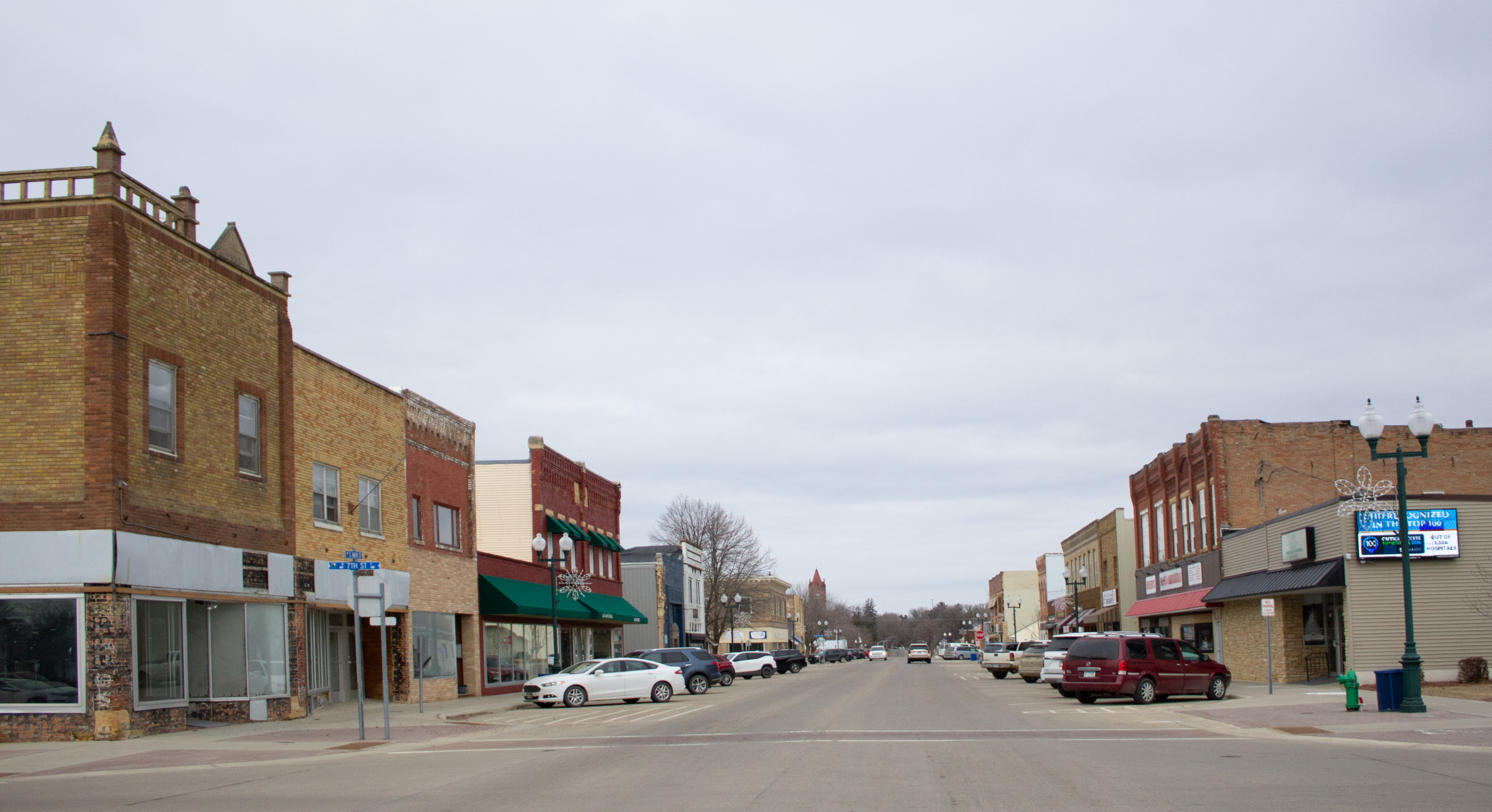
Commercial street

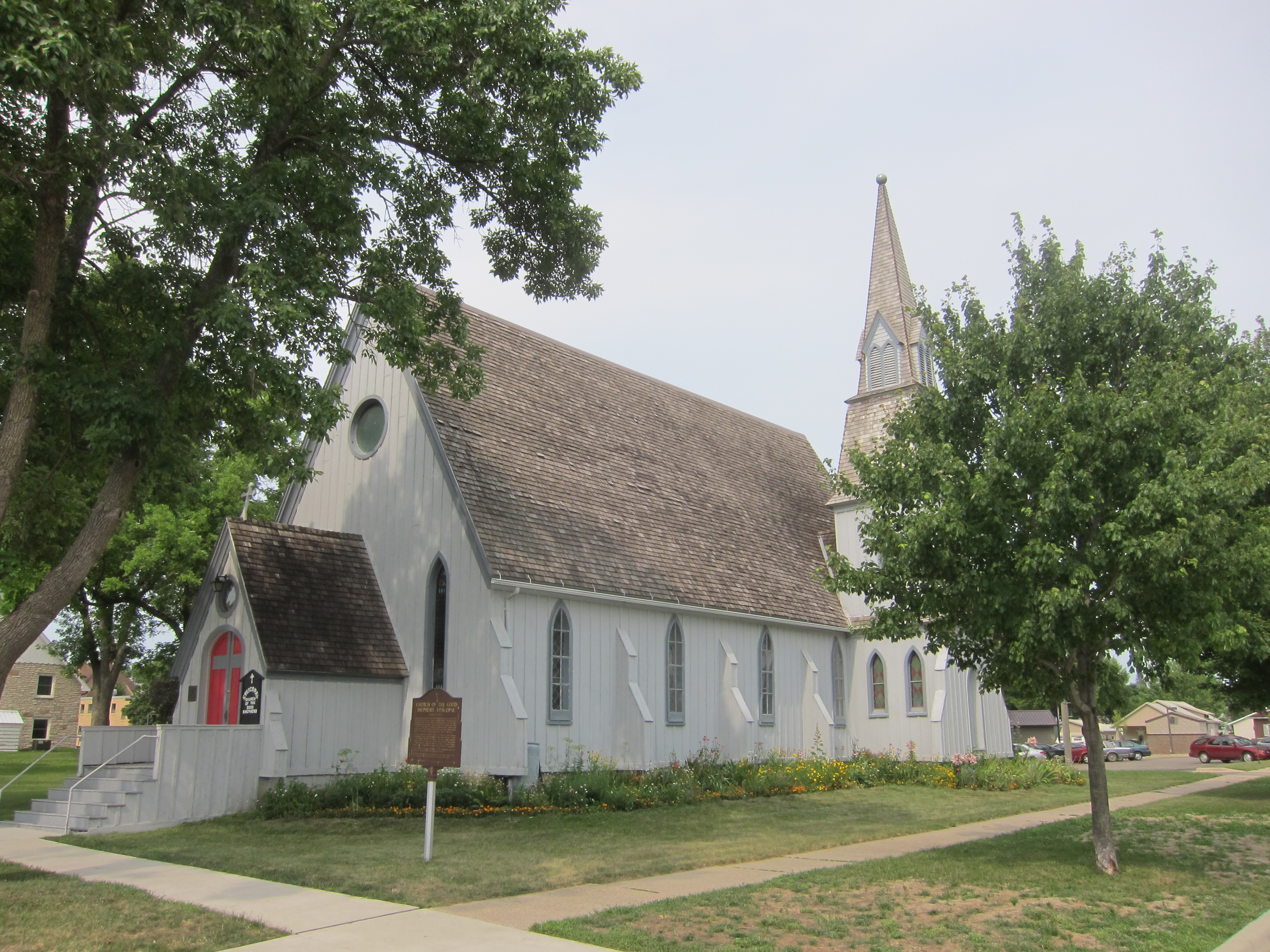
Good Shepherd Church Museum

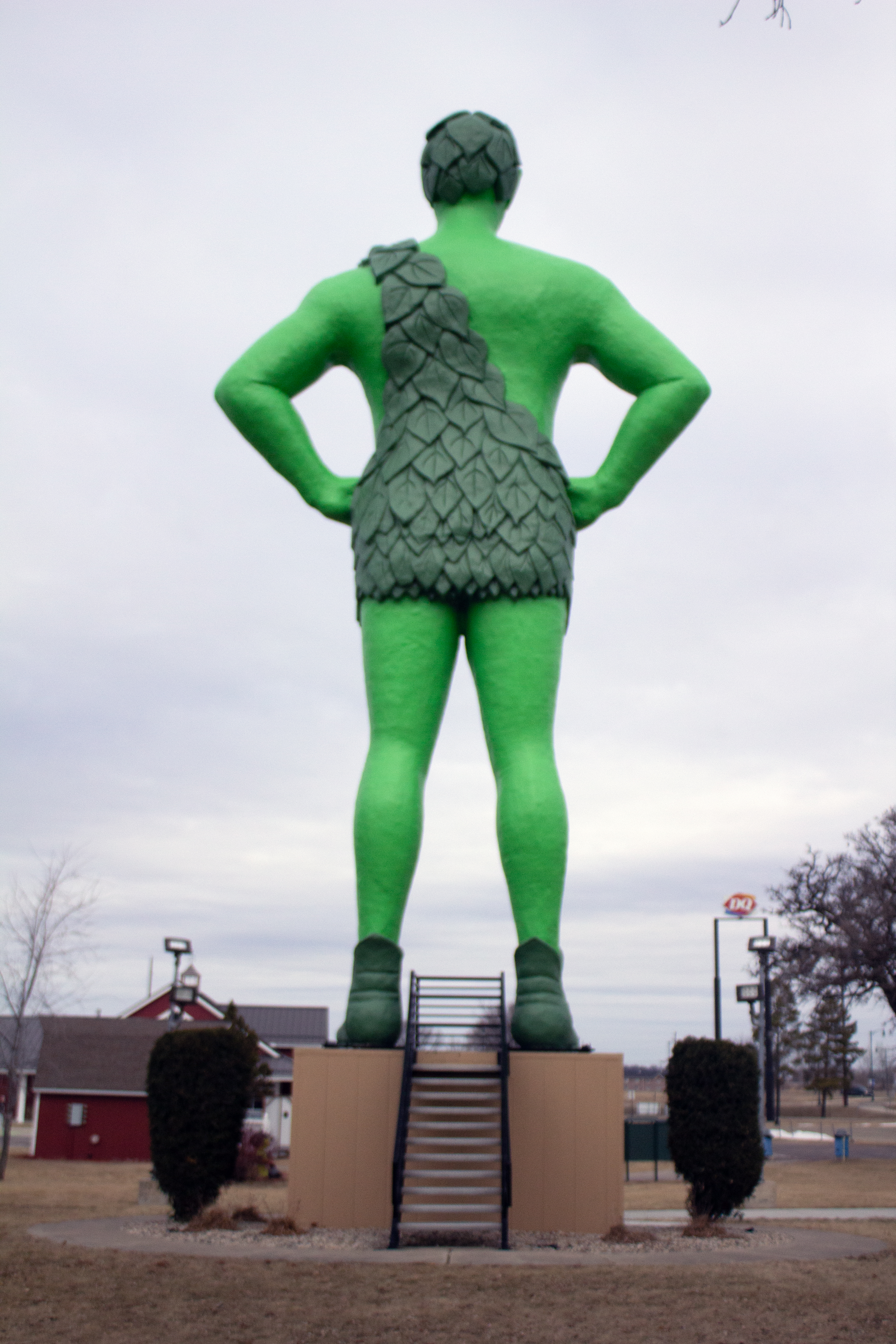
Jolly Green Giant, backside
