= Daniel D. Murphy =

American politician (1866–1944)

Daniel D. Murphy (March 11, 1866 – December 3, 1944) was an American farmer, businessman, and politician.

Murphy was born in Burnett Junction, Wisconsin. He went to the Faribault County public schools. He lived in Blue Earth, Minnesota with his wife and family. Murphy was a farmer and was involved with the automobile and farm implement businesses. Murphy served as mayor of Blue Earth, Minnesota and on the Blue Earth School Board. He was a Democrat. Murphy served in the Minnesota Senate from 1933 until his death in 1944. He died in Blue Earth, Minnesota.
