= List of county roads in Fillmore County, Minnesota =

- Standard county road marker

Highway names
- Interstates: Interstate X (I-X)
- US Highways: U.S. Highway X (US X)
- State: Trunk Highway X (MN X or TH X)
- County State-Aid Highways: County State-Aid Highway X (CSAH X)
- County Roads: County Road X (CR X)

System links
- County roads of Minnesota; Fillmore County

The following is a list of county-maintained highways in Fillmore County, Minnesota, United States. Some of the routes in this list are also County State-Aid Highways (CSAH.)

== Route list ==
Number	Length (mi)	Length (km)	Southern or western terminus	Northern or eastern terminus	Local names	Formed	Removed	Notes
CSAH 1	—	—	Mower County line (County 11)	Trinity Street in Ostrander		—	—	Southern Segment
CSAH 1	—	—	Center Street (County 3) in Ostrander	Olmsted County line (County 1)		—	—	Northern Segment
CSAH 2	—	—	Mower County line (County 2)	US 52 in Chatfield		—	—	
CSAH 3	—	—	Mower County line (County 3)	US 63 in Bloomfield Township		—	—	
CSAH 4	—	—	County 1 in Sumner Township	County 5 in Jordan Township		—	—	
CSAH 5	—	—	Iowa state line	Olmsted County line (County 145)		—	—	
CSAH 6	—	—	US 52 in Chatfield Township	County 21 in Pilot Mound Township		—	—	
CSAH 7	—	—	MN 80 in Fillmore Township	County 5 in Chatfield Township		—	—	
CSAH 8	—	—	Mower County line (County 2)	MN 16 in Lanesboro		—	—	
CSAH 9	—	—	County 44 in York Township	County 14 in Forestville Township		—	—	
CSAH 10	—	—	County 23 in Amherst Township	Houston County line (County 13)		—	—	Southern Segment
CSAH 10	—	—	County 10 in Norway Township	MN 43 in Norway Township		—	—	Northern Segment
CSAH 11	—	—	County 12 in Carimona Township	Winona County line (County 43)		—	—	
CSAH 12	—	—	County 1 in Bloomfield Township	County 5 in Forestville Township		—	—	Western Segment
CSAH 12	—	—	County 11 in Carimona Township	River Road in Preston		—	—	Central Segment
CSAH 12	—	—	US 52 in Preston Township	MN 43 in Preble Township		—	—	Eastern Segment
CSAH 13	—	—	MN 43 in Preble Township	Houston County line (County 15)		—	—	
CSAH 14	—	—	County 1 in Bloomfield Township	County 12 in Carimona Township		—	—	
CSAH 15	—	—	County 30 in Bristol Township	County 12 in Carimona Township		—	—	
CSAH 16	—	—	County 17 in Preston Township	180th Street (County 19) in Amherst Township		—	—	
CSAH 17	—	—	County 44 in Bristol Township	Ridge Road in Preston		—	—	Southern Segment
CSAH 17	—	—	St. Paul Street in Preston	County 8 in Carrolton Township		—	—	Northern Segment
CSAH 18	—	—	County 21 in Amherst Township	Houston County line (County 19)		—	—	
CR 19	—	—	180th Street (County 16) in Amherst Township	County 12 in Preston Township		—	—	
CSAH 20	—	—	County 5 in York Township	County 15 in Bristol Township		—	—	
CSAH 21	—	—	Iowa state line (County W20)	MN 16 in Lanesboro		—	—	Southern Segment
CSAH 21	—	—	County 8 in Carrolton Township	MN 30 in Pilot Mound Township		—	—	Northern Segment
CSAH 22	—	—	County 15 in Carimona Township	US 52 in Harmony		—	—	
CSAH 23	—	—	US 52 in Canton Township	MN 16 in Holt Township		—	—	
CSAH 24	—	—	County 23 in Canton Township	MN 43 in Newburg Township		—	—	
CSAH 25	—	—	County 10 in Norway Township	River Street in Peterson		—	—	Southern Segment
CSAH 25	—	—	Deep River Road in Peterson	Winona County line (County 29)		—	—	Northern Segment
CSAH 26	—	—	Mower County line (County 12)	US 63 in Beaver Township		—	—	
CSAH 27	—	—	Houston County line (County 26)	Park Street in Rushford		—	—	Southern Segment
CSAH 27	—	—	MN 43 in Rushford Village	Winona County line (County 2 / County 25)		—	—	Northern Segment
CSAH 28	—	—	Iowa state line (County W40)	Prairie Avenue in Mabel		—	—	Southern Segment
CSAH 28	—	—	120th Street in Newburg Township	County 24 in Newburg Township		—	—	Northern Segment
CR 28	—	—	County 28 in Newburg Township	Prairie Avenue in Mabel		—	—	
CR 29	—	—	451st Avenue in Newburg Township	Houston County line (County 8)		—	—	
CSAH 30	—	—	County 44 in York Township	US 52 in Canton Township		—	—	
CSAH 32	—	—	MN 30, MN 250 in Arendahl Township	Winona County line (County 33)		—	—	
CSAH 34	—	—	MN 44 in Newburg Township	Cherrywood Drive in Mabel		—	—	
CSAH 35	—	—	County 44 in Harmony	Center Street in Harmony		—	—	
CSAH 36	—	—	MN 16 in Whalan	2nd Avenue in Whalan		—	—	
CSAH 38	—	—	County 1 in Spring Valley Township	County 2 in Sumner Township		—	—	
CSAH 40	—	—	US 52 in Chatfield Township	MN 30 in Pilot Mound Township		—	—	
CSAH 44	—	—	US 63 in Beaver Township	MN 139 in Harmony		—	—	
CR 101	—	—	County 1 in Sumner Township	161st Avenue (County 38) in Sumner Township		—	—	
CR 102	—	—	161st Avenue (County 38) in Jordan Township	County 5 in Chatfield Township		—	—	
CR 104	—	—	325th Avenue in Pilot Mound Township	County 32 in Arendahl Township		—	—	
CR 105	—	—	Deep River Road in Arendahl Township	MN 30 in Arendahl Township		—	—	
CR 106	—	—	County 25 in Rushford Village	MN 43 in Rushford Village		—	—	
CR 107	—	—	County 10 in Norway Township	County 25 in Rushford Village		—	—	
CR 108	—	—	County 10 in Holt Township	County 23 in Holt Township		—	—	
CR 110	—	—	County 14 in Carimona Township	County 15 in Carimona Township		—	—	
CR 113	—	—	US 52 in Canton Township	US 52 in Canton Township		—	—	
CSAH 115	—	—	US 52 in Harmony Township	County 21 in Canton Township		—	—	
CR 115	—	—	County 21 in Canton Township	Edgewood Road in Canton Township		—	—	
CR 117	—	—	MN 80 in Wykoff	MN 16 in Fountain		—	—	
CSAH 118	—	—	County 5 in Forestville Township	212th Street in Carimona Township		—	—	
CR 138	—	—	187th Avenue in Jordan Township	Olmsted County line (County 138)		—	—	
Former
