= Lenora Methodist Episcopal Church =

Historic church in Minnesota, United States

- U.S. National Register of Historic Places
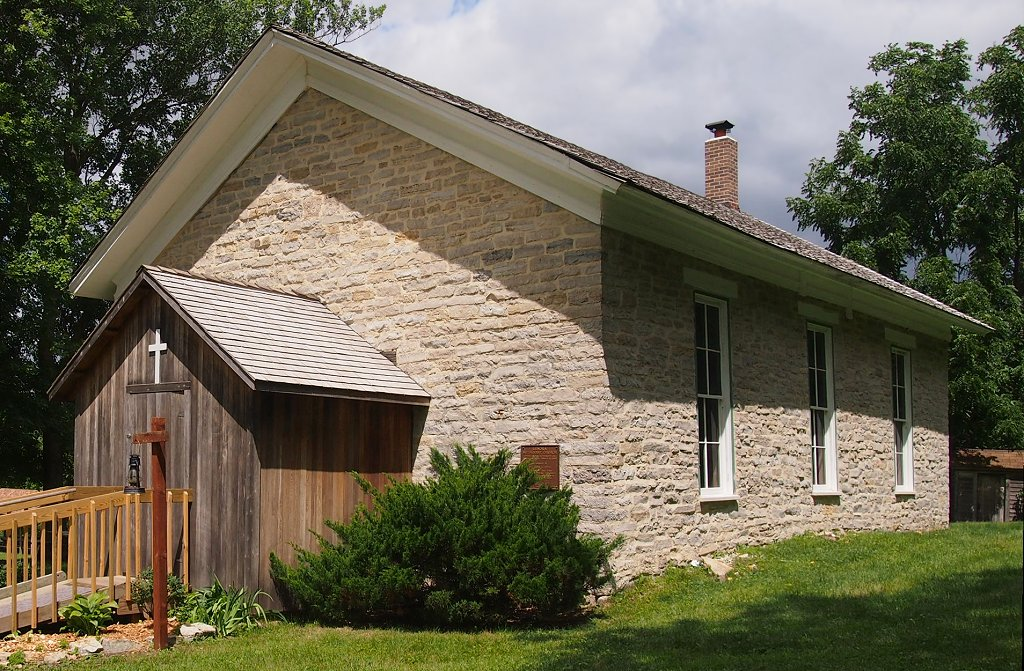
- Lenora Methodist Episcopal Church from the southeast

- Location within Minnesota Location within the United States
- Nearest city: Canton, Minnesota
- Coordinates: 43°34′26″N 91°52′48″W
- Area: less than one acre
- Built: 1856–1865
- MPS: Fillmore County MRA
- NRHP reference No.: 82001892
- Added to NRHP: November 19, 1982

Lenora Methodist Episcopal Church is a historic church in Lenora, Minnesota, United States, an unincorporated community in Canton Township, Fillmore County. It was added to the National Register of Historic Places in 1982.

== History ==
The Minnesota conference of Methodism was organized in 1845, well before Minnesota became a territory in 1849. The Reverend Benjamin Crist started visiting the Lenora area as a missionary on a circuit between Chatfield and Brownsville in 1854. In 1856 Elder John L. Dyer officially organized the congregation. He donated 40 acres (16 ha) of land and began construction of a stone building, financed by the sale of lots in the town of Lenora. The Panic of 1857 thwarted the development of the area, though, and many pioneer families moved back east. Dyer left the community and moved to Colorado, where he acquired the nickname "Snowshoe Preacher".

Construction on the church was stalled for the next eight years, with half-completed stone walls. In 1865 the area was seeing financial prosperity again, and a stonemason used material from the large uncompleted church to finish building it as a smaller structure. The church was opened in 1866 and dedicated by the Reverend Daniel Cobb. The area never really prospered, though, since the railroad bypassed Lenora. In the late 1920s, the Lenora church was closed as an active congregation.

== Preservation ==
The church building has been preserved by a congregation in Newburg. It is now known as the Lenora United Methodist Pioneer Center, and is open for occasional church services, special events, and concerts. It appears much like it did in its pioneer days, with no electricity. Lighting is provided by two oil-fueled chandeliers and oil lamps in wall sconces. Heat is provided by a wood stove, and a reed pump organ and the original wooden pews are still in place.
