= Minnesota State Highway 250 =

State highway in Minnesota, United States

Trunk Highway 250
- MN 250 highlighted in red

Route information
- Maintained by MnDOT
- Length: 9.479 mi (15.255 km)
- Existed: July 1, 1949–present

Major junctions
- South end: MN 16 in Lanesboro
- North end: MN 30 / CSAH 32 in Arendahl Township

Location
- Country: United States
- State: Minnesota
- Counties: Fillmore

Highway system
- Minnesota Trunk Highway System; Interstate; US; State; Legislative; Scenic
← MN 248	→ MN 251

Minnesota State Highway 250 (MN 250) is a 9.479-mile-long (15.255 km) highway in southeast Minnesota, which runs from its intersection with State Highway 16 in Lanesboro and continues north to its northern terminus at its intersection with State Highway 30 in Arendahl Township. MN 250 passes through Lanesboro, Holt Township, and Arendahl Township.

== Route description ==
Highway 250 serves as a north–south route in southeast Minnesota between Lanesboro and State Highway 30.

Highway 250 crosses the Root River in Lanesboro.

Most of the route is located within the Richard J. Dorer State Forest.

Highway 250 follows Parkway Avenue and Ashburn Street in Lanesboro.

The route is legally defined as Route 250 in the Minnesota Statutes.

== History ==
Highway 250 was authorized on July 1, 1949.

The route was paved in 1950.

Highway 250 and intersecting State Highway 30 in northeast Fillmore County were once part of the route of U.S. Highway 16 until 1929, when that highway was rerouted on a new alignment along the Root River between Lanesboro and Rushford.

== Major intersections ==
The entire route is in Fillmore County.

Location	mi	km	Destinations	Notes
Lanesboro	0.000	0.000	MN 16 (Sheridan Street)	
Lanesboro	0.482	0.776	CR 8 west (W. Elmwood Street)	
Lanesboro	0.437	0.703	CR 8 east (E. Coffee Street)	
Arendahl Township	9.510	15.305	MN 30	
1.000 mi = 1.609 km; 1.000 km = 0.621 mi
