= Jordan, Minnesota (disambiguation) =

Jordan, Minnesota, is a city in Scott County.

Jordan, Minnesota, may also refer to:

== Places ==
- Jordan, a ghost town in Lake County, Minnesota
- Jordan, Minneapolis, a neighborhood in the Near North community
- Jordan Historic District
- Jordan Township, Fillmore County, Minnesota

== Facilities ==
- Jordan Park, a facility of the Minneapolis Park and Recreation Board
- Jordan Junior High School, a former facility of the Minneapolis Public Schools
- Jordan High School (Jordan, Minnesota)

== Music ==
- Jordan, Minnesota (song) by Big Black on their album Atomizer

== Water resources ==
- Jordan Creek (Minnesota), a stream in Fillmore County
- Jordan Lake in the Boundary Waters Canoe Area Wilderness

== See also ==
- Jordan (disambiguation)
