= Prosper, Minnesota =

Unincorporated community in Minnesota, United States

Prosper
- Unincorporated community
- Location within Minnesota Location within the United States
- Coordinates: 43°30′28″N 91°52′11″W
- Country: United States
- State: Minnesota
- County: Fillmore
- Township: Canton Township
- Elevation: 1,355 ft (413 m)

Population
  - Total: 20
- Time zone: UTC-6 (Central (CST))
  - Summer (DST): UTC-5 (CDT)
- ZIP codes: 55954 and 55922
- Area code: 507
- GNIS feature ID: 649745

Prosper is an unincorporated community in Canton Township, Fillmore County, Minnesota, United States.

== History ==
A post office called Prosper was established in 1866 and remained in operation until it was discontinued in 1979.

== Geography ==
The community is located between Canton, Minnesota and Burr Oak, Iowa on U.S. Highway 52.

State Highway 44 (MN 44) and State Line Road are both in the vicinity.

ZIP codes 55954 (Mabel) and 55922 (Canton) meet at Prosper.
