= List of shipwrecks in November 1834 =

The list of shipwrecks in November 1834 includes ships sunk, foundered, wrecked, grounded or otherwise lost during November 1834.

== 1 November ==
List of shipwrecks: 1 November 1834
Ship	State	Description
Amici	United Kingdom	The ship was driven ashore on Norderney, Kingdom of Hanover. Her crew were rescued. She was on a voyage from Hull, Yorkshire to Hamburg.
Providence	United Kingdom	The ship sank at Weymouth, Dorset.
Sarah	United States	The ship was wrecked on Seal Island, Nova Scotia, British North America with the loss of seventeen of the 24 people on board. She was on a voyage from Boston, Massachusetts to Eastport, Maine.

== 2 November ==
List of shipwrecks: 2 November 1834
Ship	State	Description
Jean	United Kingdom	The ship foundered in the North Sea 95 nautical miles (176 km) east by south of Spurn Point, Yorkshire. Her crew were rescued. She was on a voyage from London to Dundee, Forfarshire.

== 3 November ==
List of shipwrecks: 3 November 1834
Ship	State	Description
Blanche	(United Kingdom of Great Britain and Ireland) British North America	The ship was driven ashore and severely damaged on Eight Island, County Donegal, United Kingdom. She was on a voyage from Kinsale, County Cork, United Kingdom to Donegal.
Leeds	United Kingdom	The steamship struck the Hurry Furlows Rocks, in the Irish Sea. All on board were rescued by the steamship Commerce (United Kingdom), which towed her in to Holyhead, Anglesey, where she sank. Leeds was on a voyage from Liverpool, Lancashire to Dublin.

== 4 November ==
List of shipwrecks: 4 November 1834
Ship	State	Description
Attentic	Denmark	The ship was driven ashore on Süderoog, Duchy of Holstein.
Bolderaa	Russia	The ship was driven ashore in the Bay of Monckwick. She was on a voyage from Reval to Porvoo, Grand Duchy of Finland.
Consolateur	France	The ship was driven ashore in the Dardanelles. She was on a voyage from Marseille, Bouches-du-Rhône to Constantinople, Ottoman Empire.
Hunter	United States	The brig was driven ashore and wrecked at "Jerucho", Cuba with the loss of 29 of the 36 people on board. She was on a voyage from New York to New Orleans, Louisiana.
John	United Kingdom	The ship was driven ashore and wrecked at Rattray Head, Aberdeenshire. She was on a voyage from Newcastle upon Tyne, Northumberland to the Moray Firth.
Maria	United Kingdom	The schooner was wrecked off Rattray Head with the loss of all hands. She was on a voyage from South Shields, County Durham to Inverness.
Meridian	United Kingdom	The ship was driven ashore and severely damaged at Southport, Lancashire. She was on a voyage from Liverpool, Lancashire to Newfoundland, British North America.
HMS Nimble	Royal Navy	The schooner was wrecked on Cay Verde, Bahamas with the loss of 70 lives.
Pursground	Sweden	The ship was driven ashore on Sylt, Duchy of Holstein. She was on a voyage from Stockholm to London, United Kingdom
Rebecca	United Kingdom	The brig was abandoned in the North Sea 80 leagues (240 nautical miles (440 km)) south east of Great Yarmouth, Norfolk She subsequently foundered.
Vestal	United Kingdom	The ship was driven ashore on Rutland Island, County Donegal.

== 5 November ==
List of shipwrecks: 5 November 1834
Ship	State	Description
Aid	United Kingdom	The schooner was driven ashore and wrecked at Tyrella, County Down. She was later repaired at Newcastle, County Down and was re-launched on 16 April 1835.
Henry	United Kingdom	The ship was driven ashore at Sheerness, Kent.
Limmet	United Kingdom	The ship sprang a leak and was beached at Cresswell, Northumberland. She was on a voyage from Hull, Yorkshire to Newcastle upon Tyne, Northumberland.
John	United Kingdom	The ship was abandoned in the Atlantic Ocean. Her crew were rescued by Wexford (United Kingdom). She was on a voyage from Newfoundland, British North America to Bristol, Gloucestershire.
Mary and Ann	United Kingdom	The ship was lost in the North Sea off Cromer, Norfolk. She was on a voyage from Great Yarmouth, Norfolk to the Humber.
Rhydland Castle	United Kingdom	The ship was driven ashore at Derbyhaven, Isle of Man. Her crew were rescued. She was on a voyage from Whitehaven, Cumberland to Dublin.
Spectator	United Kingdom	The ship sank at Kilrush, County Clare.
Tarborough	United States	The ship capsized in the Atlantic Ocean (25°30′N 69°00′W) with the loss of all on board bar her captain - twelve live lost. She was on a voyage from Saint Thomas, Virgin Islands to New York.

== 6 November ==
List of shipwrecks: 6 November 1834
Ship	State	Description
Buccleuch	United Kingdom	The ship struck a rock and foundered in the English Channel off Guernsey, Channel Islands. Her crew were rescued. She was on a voyage from Dénia, Spain to London.
Edina	United Kingdom	The ship foundered in the Indian Ocean (17°N 19°E) with the loss of all hands. She was on a voyage from Calcutta, India to Singapore.
John Fairfield	United Kingdom	The brig was wrecked on Scarlet Point, Isle of Man. All on board were rescued. She was on her maiden voyage, from Liverpool, Lancashire to Havana, Cuba.
Louisa	United Kingdom	The ship was wrecked on the "Little Isaacs". She was on a voyage from Liverpool to Havana.
Mansfield	United Kingdom	The ship was abandoned off Bellmullet, County Mayo. She was on a voyage from Saint John, New Brunswick, British North America to Ballyshannon, County Donegal.
Rhudlind Canota	United Kingdom	The ship was driven ashore at Derbyhaven, Isle of Man. Her crew were rescued. She was on a voyage from Whitehaven, Cumberland to Dublin.
Zephyr	United Kingdom	The ship was driven ashore and wrecked east of Penzance, Cornwall with the loss of her captain. She was on a voyage from "Gergenti" to Newcastle upon Tyne, Northumberland.

== 7 November ==
List of shipwrecks: 7 November 1834
Ship	State	Description
Adventure	United Kingdom	The ship was driven ashore near Ramsey, Isle of Man. She wason a voyage from Whitehaven, Cumberland to Dublin.
Clementine	Stettin	The ship was wrecked on Rottumeroog, Groningen, Netherlands. She was on a voyage from Stettin to Bordeaux, Gironde, France.
Eleanora	United Kingdom	The schooner was driven ashore in Cushendall Bay with the loss of her captain. She was on a voyage from Saltcoats, Ayrshire to Sligo. She was refloated on 18 November and taken in to Saltcoats.
Eliza	United Kingdom	The schooner foundered off Arklow, County Wicklow. Her crew were rescued. She was on a voyage from Wicklow to Swansea, Glamorgan.
Eliza	United States	The ship was driven ashore and wrecked at Arklow. Her crew were rescued.
Elizabeth	United Kingdom	The ketch was driven ashore and wrecked at Ballywalter, County Down. Her three crew were rescued. She was on a voyage from Beaumaris, Anglesey to Donaghadee, County Down.
Hectonia	United Kingdom	The ship was driven ashore near Ramsey. She was on a voyage from Liverpool, Lancashire to Dromore, County Down.
John	United Kingdom	The ship was driven ashore and wrecked at Castletown, Isle of Man. She was on a voyage from Liverpool, Lancashire to Havana, Cuba.
Margaret	Malta	The barque struck the Mixon Shoal, in the Bristol Channel and was consequently beached at The Mumbles, Glamorgan. She was subsequently repaired.
Primrose	United Kingdom	The ship was driven ashore near Mablethorpe, Lincolnshire. She was on a voyage from London to Hull, Yorkshire. Primrose was later refloated.
St. Peter	United Kingdom	The ship was driven ashore and wrecked at Scarlet Point, Ramsey with the loss of six of her crew. There were at least ten survivors. She was on a voyage from Liverpool to Porvoo, Grand Duchy of Finland.
Violet	United Kingdom	The ship was driven ashore on "Ratland Island".

== 8 November ==
List of shipwrecks: 8 November 1834
Ship	State	Description
Ploen	Norway	The ship foundered in the North Sea. She was on a voyage from London, United Kingdom to Arendahl.

== 9 November ==
List of shipwrecks: 9 November 1834
Ship	State	Description
Christiana	Sweden	The ship capsized and sank in the North Sea off Berwick upon Tweed, Northumberland, United Kingdom with the loss of all on board. She was on a voyage from Stockholm to Berwick upon Tweed.
Concord	United Kingdom	The ship struck rocks and sank in the North Sea off South Shields, County Durham.
Henry and Mary	United Kingdom	The ship foundered in the English Channel off the Owers Lightship ( Trinity House). Her crew were rescued.

== 10 November ==
List of shipwrecks: 10 November 1834
Ship	State	Description
Cartha	United Kingdom	The ship was driven ashore at "Ballyfessie". All on board were rescued. She was on a voyage from Glasgow, Renfrewshire to Savannah, Georgia, United States.
Hollow Oak	United Kingdom	The ship foundered in the Bristol Channel off Cardiff, Glamorgan.
Marquis of Huntley	United Kingdom	The ship ran aground while carrying ordnance and admiralty stores and 11 invalids from Leith to London. She was gotten off by the next morning.
Two Brothers	United Kingdom	The ship was driven ashore at Kirtley, Suffolk.
Union	United Kingdom	The ship was driven ashore at Orford, Suffolk. She was refloated on 12 November and taken in to Aldeburgh, Suffolk.

== 11 November ==
List of shipwrecks: 11 November 1834
Ship	State	Description
Jean	United Kingdom	The ship was driven ashore in the Firth of Tay. Her crew were rescued. She was on a voyage from Newcastle upon Tyne, Northumberland to Perth.
St. Antonio	Kingdom of Sardinia	The ship was wrecked at the mouth of the Ebro. She was on a voyage from Genoa to Marseille, Bouches-du-Rhône, France.

== 12 November ==
List of shipwrecks: 12 November 1834
Ship	State	Description
Amiable Gertruida	flag unknown	The ship was wrecked at Key West, Florida, United States. She was on a voyage from Havana, Cuba to A Coruña, Spain.
Cartha	United Kingdom	The ship was driven ashore at Ballywalter, County Antrim. She was on a voyage from Greenock, Renfrewshire to Charleston, South Carolina, United States.
Gustav Adolph	Sweden	The ship ran aground on the Niding Reef. She was on a voyage from Stockholm to Sète, Hérault, France.
Hancock	(United Kingdom of Great Britain and Ireland) New South Wales	The ship sank in Gravesend Bay, New York, United States.
Nimble	United Kingdom	The ship was driven ashore at Harrington, Cumberland.
Phœnix	United Kingdom	The ship was wrecked on the Niding Reef. Her crew were rescued. She was on a voyage from Saint Petersburg, Russia to London.

== 13 November ==
List of shipwrecks: 13 November 1834
Ship	State	Description
Brothers	United Kingdom	The ship was wrecked on the Palvo Reef. She was on a voyage from Kronstadt, Russia to Hull, Yorkshire.
Husdell	United Kingdom	The ship was holed by her anchor and sank at South Shields, County Durham.

== 14 November ==
List of shipwrecks: 14 November 1834
Ship	State	Description
Baron van der Pahlen	Russia	The ship was driven ashore and wrecked on Stronsay, Orkney Islands, United Kingdom. She was on a voyage from Saint Petersburg to Liverpool, Lancashire, United Kingdom.
Mainane	Norway	The ship was driven ashore and wrecked at Montrose, Forfarshire, United Kingdom.
Vagabond	France	The ship was wrecked at the mouth of the Rhône. She was on a voyage from "Bourgneux" to Marseille, Bouches-du-Rhône.

== 15 November ==
List of shipwrecks: 15 November 1834
Ship	State	Description
Thetis	Sweden	The ship foundered in the English Channel off The Lizard, Cornwall, United Kingdom. Her crew survived. She was on a voyage from Trapani, Sicily to Gothenburg.

== 16 November ==
List of shipwrecks: 16 November 1834
Ship	State	Description
Margaret and Agnes	United Kingdom	The sloop departed from Port William, Wigtownshire for Newry, County Down. No further trace, presumed foundered with the loss of all hands.

== 17 November ==
List of shipwrecks: 17 November 1834
Ship	State	Description
Marie Augustine	France	The ship was wrecked at Cape Palos, Spain. Her crew were rescued. She was on a voyage from Marseille, Bouches-du-Rhône to a port in North America.
Mary Ann	United Kingdom	The schooner was wrecked on the Mixon Sands, in the Bristol Channel. All on board were rescued.

== 18 November ==
List of shipwrecks: 18 November 1834
Ship	State	Description
Clovis	(Russian Empire) Grand Duchy of Finland	The ship was driven ashore at Køge, Denmark. She was on a voyage from Hamina to Marseille, Bouches-du-Rhône, France.

== 19 November ==
List of shipwrecks: 19 November 1834
Ship	State	Description
Edward	United Kingdom	The ship was wrecked at Memel, Prussia. She was on a voyage from Memel to London.

== 20 November ==
List of shipwrecks: 20 November 1834
Ship	State	Description
Cherub	United Kingdom	The ship was wrecked in Manchester Bay. There were five survivors. She was on a voyage from Newfoundland, British North America to Cork.
Mary Ann	United Kingdom	The ship was wrecked at Lowestoft, Suffolk. Her crew were rescued.
Morpeth Castle	United Kingdom	The brig was driven ashore in Rozel Bay, Jersey, Channel Islands. She was on a voyage from Newcastle upon Tyne, Northumberland to Jersey.
Orleans	United States	The ship was driven ashore at New Orleans, Louisiana.
Speedwell	United Kingdom	The ship was driven ashore at Kamourska, Lower Canada, British North America. She was on a voyage from Montreal, Lower Canada, to Hull, Yorkshire.
Swift	United Kingdom	The sloop foundered in Liverpool Bay off Southport, Lancashire with the loss of all three crew. She was on a voyage from Port William, Wigtownshire to Liverpool, Lancashire.

== 23 November ==
List of shipwrecks: 23 November 1834
Ship	State	Description
Anthony	United Kingdom	The ship was run down and sunk in the Bristol Channel off the Tusker Rock by Celt (United Kingdom). Her crew were rescued.

== 24 November ==
List of shipwrecks: 24 November 1834
Ship	State	Description
Lady Durham	United Kingdom	The brig caught fire in port at Ascension Island. Her crew were rescued. She was set adrift and consequently sank. Lady Durham was on a voyage from the British Cameroons to Liverpool, Lancashire.
Missouri Belle	United States	The steamboat was in collision with Boonslick (United States) 15 miles (24 km) upstream of New Orleans, Louisiana and sank with the loss of ten lives. Missouri Belle was on a voyage from St. Louis, Missouri to New Orleans.
Perceval	(United Kingdom of Great Britain and Ireland) British North America	The ship was wrecked on Anticosti Island, Lower Canada.
Valancy	United Kingdom	The ship struck a rock off Mullion Island, Cornwall and was beached.

== 25 November ==
List of shipwrecks: 25 November 1834
Ship	State	Description
Emilie	France	The ship was wrecked on Borkum, Kingdom of Hanover. She was on a voyage from Saint Petersburg, Russia to Boulogne, Pas-de-Calais.
Intrepid	United Kingdom	The ship was driven ashore and wrecked at Colombo, Ceylon. Her crew were rescued.

== 26 November ==
List of shipwrecks: 26 November 1834
Ship	State	Description
Rudolph	Stettin	The ship was wrecked on Anholt, Denmark. She was on a voyage from Newcastle upon Tyne, Northumberland. United Kingdom to Stettin.
Valliant	United Kingdom	The ship ran aground in the River Shannon and was wrecked. She was on a voyage from Limerick to London.

== 27 November ==
List of shipwrecks: 27 November 1834
Ship	State	Description
Bon Barthelemi	Spain	The ship was wrecked at the mouth of the Adige.

== 28 November ==
List of shipwrecks: 28 November 1834
Ship	State	Description
Emulous	United Kingdom	The smack was driven ashore and wrecked at Ramsey, Isle of Man with the loss of all four people on board. She was on a voyage from Whitehaven, Cumberland to Ramsey.
Hectorina	United Kingdom	The smack was driven ashore at Ramsey.
Springfield	United Kingdom	The ship was wrecked on Grand Cayman. Her 30 crew survived. She was on a voyage from Belfast, County Antrim to New Orleans, Louisiana, United States.
St Peter	Russia	The ship was driven ashore and wrecked at Ramsey with the loss of all seventeen crew. She was on a voyage from Liverpool, Lancashire to Porvoo, Grand Duchy of Finland.

== 30 November ==
List of shipwrecks: 30 November 1834
Ship	State	Description
James and Elizabeth	United Kingdom	The sloop was abandoned off Peterhead, Aberdeenshire. Her crew were rescued by the Peterhead pilot boat. James and Elizabeth was on a voyage from Peterhead to Fisherrow, Lothian.
Pomona	United Kingdom	The ship was wrecked on Canna, Inner Hebrides. Her crew were rescued. She was on a voyage from Loch Borsdale to the Clyde.
Rolling Bannock	(United Kingdom of Great Britain and Ireland) Isle of Man	The ship was driven ashore and wrecked at Parton, Cumberland with the loss of three of the four people on board. She was on a voyage from a Manx port to Whitehaven, Cumberland.

== Unknown date ==
List of shipwrecks: Unknown date 1834
Ship	State	Description
Albion	United Kingdom	The ship foundered in the North Sea off Gristhorpe, Yorkshire on or before 13 November.
Antonio	Spain	The ship was lost at Mahón, Menorca before 26 November. She was on a voyage from London, United Kingdom to Barcelona.
Apollo	Stettin	The ship was driven ashore at Hel, Prussia before 10 November. She was subsequently declared a total loss. Apollo was on a voyage from Riga, Russia to Stettin.
Camilla	flag unknown	The ship sank in the Ems before 2 November. She was on a voyage from "Naskow" to Lisbon, Portugal.
Diana	United Kingdom	The Smack was lost off Cromarty. Her crew were rescued.
Die Sonne Von Amelam	flag unknown	The ship foundered off Sylt, Duchy of Holstein on or before 7 November.
Dolphin	Sweden	The ship was lost off Nykarleby, Grand Duchy of Finland.
Earl of Fife	United Kingdom	The ship was wrecked at "Raemish Point". She was on a voyage from "Birken Island" to Stornoway, Outer Hebrides.
Elizabeth Julia	France	The ship was driven ashore on Noirmoutier, Vendée. She was on a voyage from Beauvoir, Manche to Marseille, Bouches-du-Rhône.
Ellida	Sweden	The ship was wrecked at Reval, Russia before 4 November. She was on a voyage from Saint Petersburg, Russia to Landskrona.
Good Intent	United Kingdom	The ship foundered in the English Channel off Hastings, Sussex.
Gustava Charlotta	Sweden	The ship was lost off Raaha, Grand Duchy of Finland.
Hudsell	United Kingdom	The ship was holed by her anchor and sank at South Shields, County Durham.
Jeanne d'Arc	France	The ship was wrecked near Cape Finisterre, Spain with the loss of about 350 lives.
Lykken	Norway	The ship was driven ashore and wrecked on Sylt. She was on a voyage from Bergen to Christiansand.
Mansfield	United Kingdom	The ship was abandoned in the Atlantic Ocean off Belmullet, County Mayo. Having been plundered by local inhabitants, she was taken into Ennis Quay Island on 9 November. Mansfield was on a voyage from Saint John, New Brunswick, British North America to Ballyshannon, County Donegal.
Margaret	United Kingdom	The ship was driven ashore at Pevensey, Sussex. Her crew were rescued.
Otto Hermans	Sweden	The ship was lost off Vaasa, Grand duchy of Finland.
Puget	United Kingdom	The ship was wrecked at Reval before 4 November. She was on a voyage from Saint Petersburg to Liverpool, Lancashire.
Rambler	United Kingdom	The ship was wrecked on Father Point, Lower Canada, British North America after 24 November. She was on a voyage from Quebec City, Lower Canada to Dublin.
Speclateur	France	The ship was driven ashore at Portlethen, Cornwall, United Kingdom before 8 November.
Trois Frères	United Kingdom	The ship was wrecked off the Île d'Yeu, Vendée. She was on a voyage from Saint-Gilles to Marseille.
Twe Broders	Sweden	The ship was driven ashore and wrecked near Kalmar. Her crew were rescued. She was on a voyage from Kalmar to Hull, Yorkshire, United Kingdom.
William the Fourth	United Kingdom	The ship was wrecked south of the mouth of the River Plate before 7 November with the loss of three of her crew. She was on a voyage from London to Valparaíso, Chile.
Young Rover	United Kingdom	The ship's crew mutinied, murdering the officers and passengers. She was beached on the Burmese coast and set afire. Young Rover was on a voyage from Moulmein, Burma to Calcutta, India.
