= Preble Township =

Preble Township may refer to the following townships in the United States:

- Preble Township, Adams County, Indiana
- Preble Township, Fillmore County, Minnesota
