= York Township, Fillmore County, Minnesota =

York Township, Minnesota
- Township
- Location within the state of Minnesota York Township, Minnesota (the United States)
- Coordinates: 43°32′45″N 92°16′28″W
- Country: United States
- State: Minnesota
- County: Fillmore

Area
  - Total: 36.1 sq mi (93.5 km^{2})
  - Land: 36.1 sq mi (93.4 km^{2})
  - Water: 0.039 sq mi (0.1 km^{2})
- Elevation: 1,319 ft (402 m)

Population (2000)
  - Total: 409
  - Density: 11/sq mi (4.4/km^{2})
- Time zone: UTC-6 (Central (CST))
  - Summer (DST): UTC-5 (CDT)
- FIPS code: 27-72076
- GNIS feature ID: 0666067

York Township is a township in Fillmore County, Minnesota, United States. The population was 409 at the 2000 census. York Township borders Forestville Township, Bloomfield Township, Beaver Township, Carimona Township, and Bristol Township.

York Township was organized in 1858, and was probably named after York, in England.

== Geography ==
According to the United States Census Bureau, the township has a total area of 36.1 square miles (93.6 km^{2}), of which 36.1 square miles (93.4 km^{2}) is land and 0.1 square mile (0.1 km^{2}) (0.14%) is water.

== Demographics ==
As of the census of 2000, there were 409 people, 147 households, and 114 families residing in the township. The population density was 11.3 people per square mile (4.4/km^{2}). There were 159 housing units at an average density of 4.4/sq mi (1.7/km^{2}). The racial makeup of the township was 98.53% White, 0.24% Asian, 0.73% from other races, and 0.49% from two or more races. Hispanic or Latino of any race were 1.22% of the population.

There were 147 households, out of which 34.7% had children under the age of 18 living with them, 69.4% were married couples living together, 2.7% had a female householder with no husband present, and 21.8% were non-families. 19.0% of all households were made up of individuals, and 10.9% had someone living alone who was 65 years of age or older. The average household size was 2.78 and the average family size was 3.21.

In the township the population was spread out, with 27.4% under the age of 18, 9.5% from 18 to 24, 25.2% from 25 to 44, 21.5% from 45 to 64, and 16.4% who were 65 years of age or older. The median age was 38 years. For every 100 females, there were 121.1 males. For every 100 females age 18 and over, there were 112.1 males.

The median income for a household in the township was $37,250, and the median income for a family was $42,917. Males had a median income of $31,528 versus $21,458 for females. The per capita income for the township was $21,055. About 3.7% of families and 9.4% of the population were below the poverty line, including 14.8% of those under age 18 and 16.4% of those age 65 or over.
