= Clear Grit, Minnesota =

Ghost town in Minnesota, United States

Clear Grit
- Ghost town
- Location within Minnesota Location within the United States
- Coordinates: 43°42′32″N 92°01′56″W
- Country: United States
- State: Minnesota
- County: Fillmore
- Time zone: UTC-6 (Central (CST))
  - Summer (DST): UTC-5 (CDT)
- ZIP code: 55949
- Area code: 507

Clear Grit is a ghost town in Carrolton Township, Fillmore County, in the U.S. state of Minnesota.

== History ==
Clear Grit was founded as a mill town on the South branch of the Root River. A post office was established at Clear Grit in 1878, but it only lasted until 1882. The former community is part of the Old Barn Resort.

Historical population
Census	Pop.	Note	%±
1880	107		—
U.S. Decennial Census
