= Elliota, Minnesota =

Ghost town in Minnesota

Elliota
- Ghost town
- Location within Minnesota Location within the United States
- Coordinates: 43°30′04″N 91°56′29″W
- Country: United States
- State: Minnesota
- County: Fillmore
- Elevation: 1,273 ft (388 m)
- Time zone: UTC-6 (Central (CST))
  - Summer (DST): UTC-5 (CDT)
- ZIP code: 55922
- Area code: 507

Elliota is a ghost town in Canton Township, Fillmore County, in the U.S. state of Minnesota.

== History ==
Elliota was founded in 1853 by Captain Julius W. Elliott, the first settler, postmaster, and blacksmith. A post office was established at Elliota in 1854, and remained in operation until it was discontinued in 1882. The Elliota cemetery remains today.

Historical population
| Census | Pop. | Note | %± |
|---|---|---|---|
| 1880 | 71 | | — |
U.S. Decennial Census
