= Bratsberg, Minnesota =

Unincorporated community in Minnesota, United States

Bratsberg
- Unincorporated community
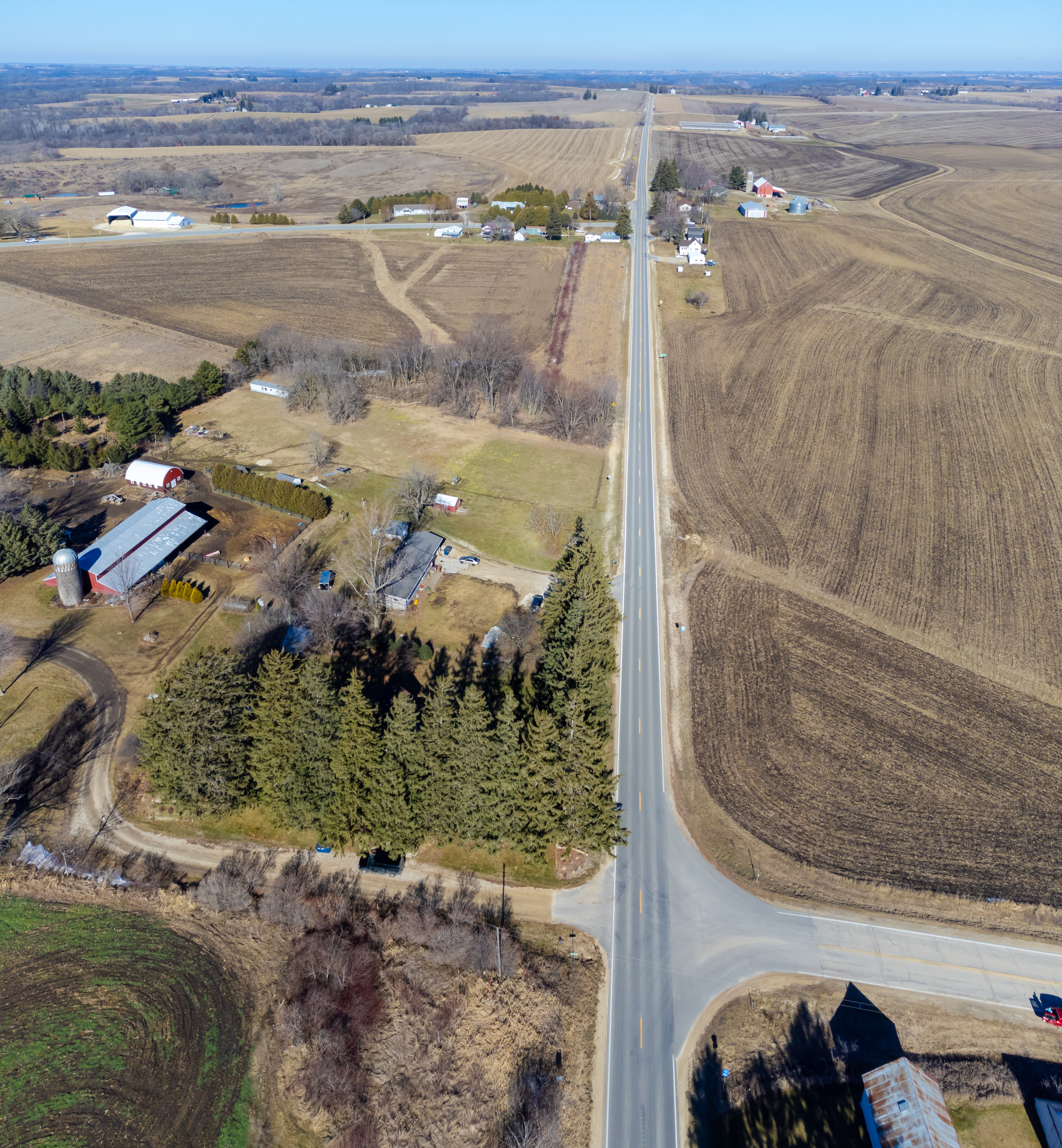
- MN-43 runs through town Norway Town Hall pictured in upper left

- Location within Minnesota Location within the United States
- Coordinates: 43°44′06″N 91°46′14″W
- Country: United States
- State: Minnesota
- County: Fillmore
- Elevation: 1,214 ft (370 m)
- Time zone: UTC-6 (Central (CST))
  - Summer (DST): UTC-5 (CDT)
- Area code: 507
- GNIS feature ID: 640442

Bratsberg is an unincorporated community in Fillmore County, in the U.S. state of Minnesota.

== History ==
A post office was established at Bratsberg in 1862, and remained in operation until it was discontinued in 1907. The community was named after the township of Bratsberg, in Skien, Norway.
