= Highland, Fillmore County, Minnesota =

Unincorporated community in Minnesota, United States

Highland
- Unincorporated community
- Location within Minnesota Location within the United States
- Coordinates: 43°40′51″N 91°52′13″W
- Country: United States
- State: Minnesota
- County: Fillmore
- Elevation: 1,175 ft (358 m)
- Time zone: UTC-6 (Central (CST))
  - Summer (DST): UTC-5 (CDT)
- Area code: 507
- GNIS feature ID: 644944

Highland is an unincorporated community in Fillmore County, in the U.S. state of Minnesota.

== History ==
A post office was established in Highland in 1857, and remained in operation until it was discontinued in 1902. The community was named for its lofty elevation.
