= Fountain Township, Fillmore County, Minnesota =

Fountain Township, Minnesota
- Township
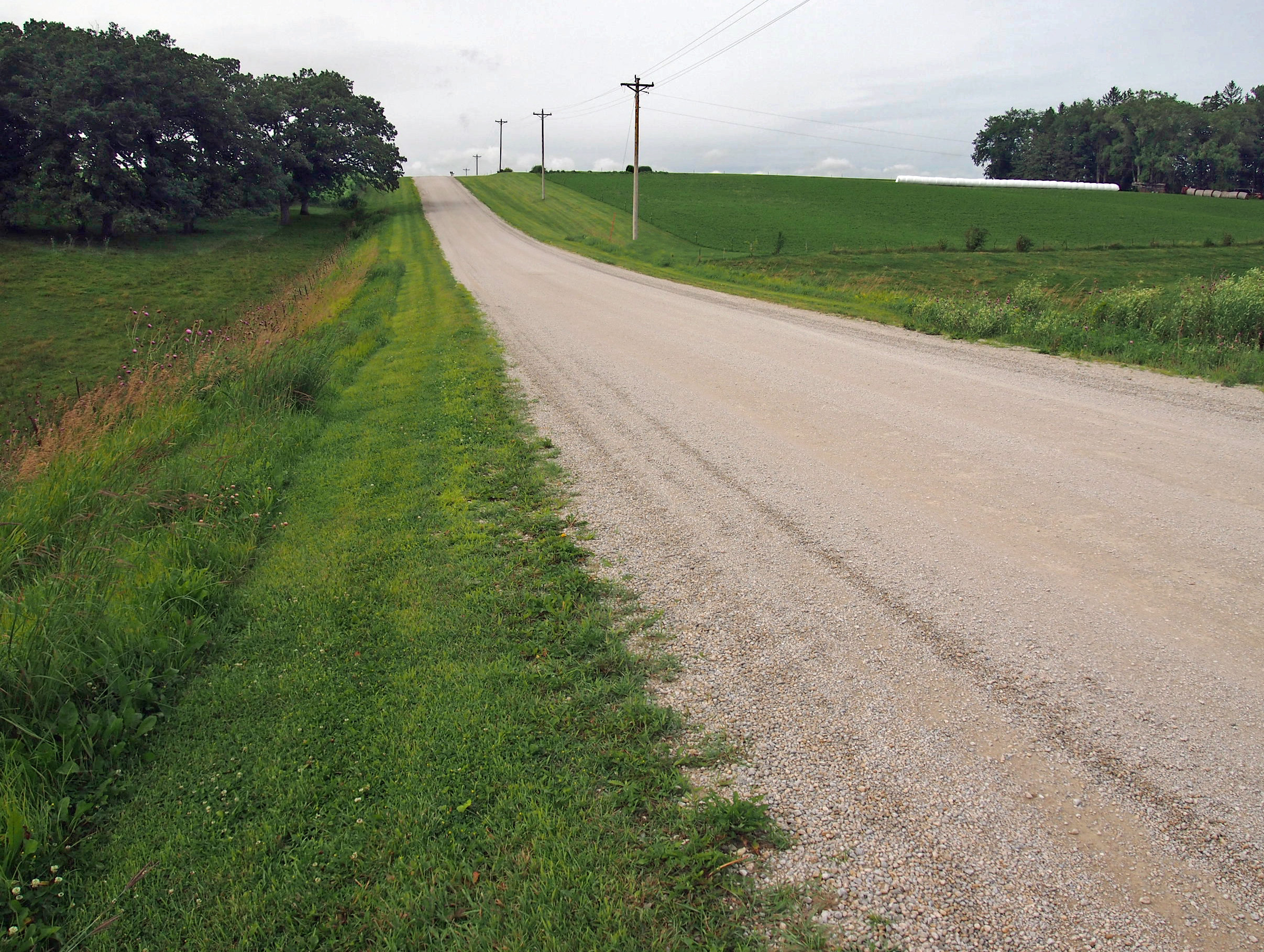
- 277th Avenue in Fountain Township

- Location within the state of Minnesota Fountain Township, Minnesota (the United States)
- Coordinates: 43°43′11″N 92°8′48″W
- Country: United States
- State: Minnesota
- County: Fillmore

Area
  - Total: 34.9 sq mi (90.5 km^{2})
  - Land: 34.9 sq mi (90.5 km^{2})
  - Water: 0 sq mi (0.0 km^{2})
- Elevation: 1,263 ft (385 m)

Population (2000)
  - Total: 316
  - Density: 9.1/sq mi (3.5/km^{2})
- Time zone: UTC-6 (Central (CST))
  - Summer (DST): UTC-5 (CDT)
- ZIP code: 55935
- Area code: 507
- FIPS code: 27-22112
- GNIS feature ID: 0664208

Fountain Township is a township in Fillmore County, Minnesota, United States. The population was 316 at the 2000 census.

Fountain Township was organized in 1858, and named for a local railroad water stop called "Fountain Spring".

== Geography ==
According to the United States Census Bureau, the township has a total area of 34.9 square miles (90 km^{2}), all land.

== Demographics ==
As of the census of 2000, there were 316 people, 120 households, and 96 families residing in the township. The population density was 9.0 inhabitants per square mile (3.5/km^{2}). There were 128 housing units at an average density of 3.7 per square mile (1.4/km^{2}). The racial makeup of the township was 99.68% White and 0.32% Asian. Hispanic or Latino of any race were 1.27% of the population.

There were 120 households, out of which 32.5% had children under the age of 18 living with them, 71.7% were married couples living together, 4.2% had a female householder with no husband present, and 20.0% were non-families. 16.7% of all households were made up of individuals, and 8.3% had someone living alone who was 65 years of age or older. The average household size was 2.63 and the average family size was 2.95.

In the township the population was spread out, with 25.9% under the age of 18, 8.2% from 18 to 24, 21.2% from 25 to 44, 27.2% from 45 to 64, and 17.4% who were 65 years of age or older. The median age was 42 years. For every 100 females, there were 106.5 males. For every 100 females age 18 and over, there were 112.7 males.

The median income for a household in the township was $50,250, and the median income for a family was $51,750. Males had a median income of $31,719 versus $23,438 for females. The per capita income for the township was $17,518. About 4.3% of families and 5.6% of the population were below the poverty line, including 7.0% of those under age 18 and 3.4% of those age 65 or over.
