= Henrytown, Minnesota =

Unincorporated community in Minnesota, US

Henrytown
- Unincorporated community
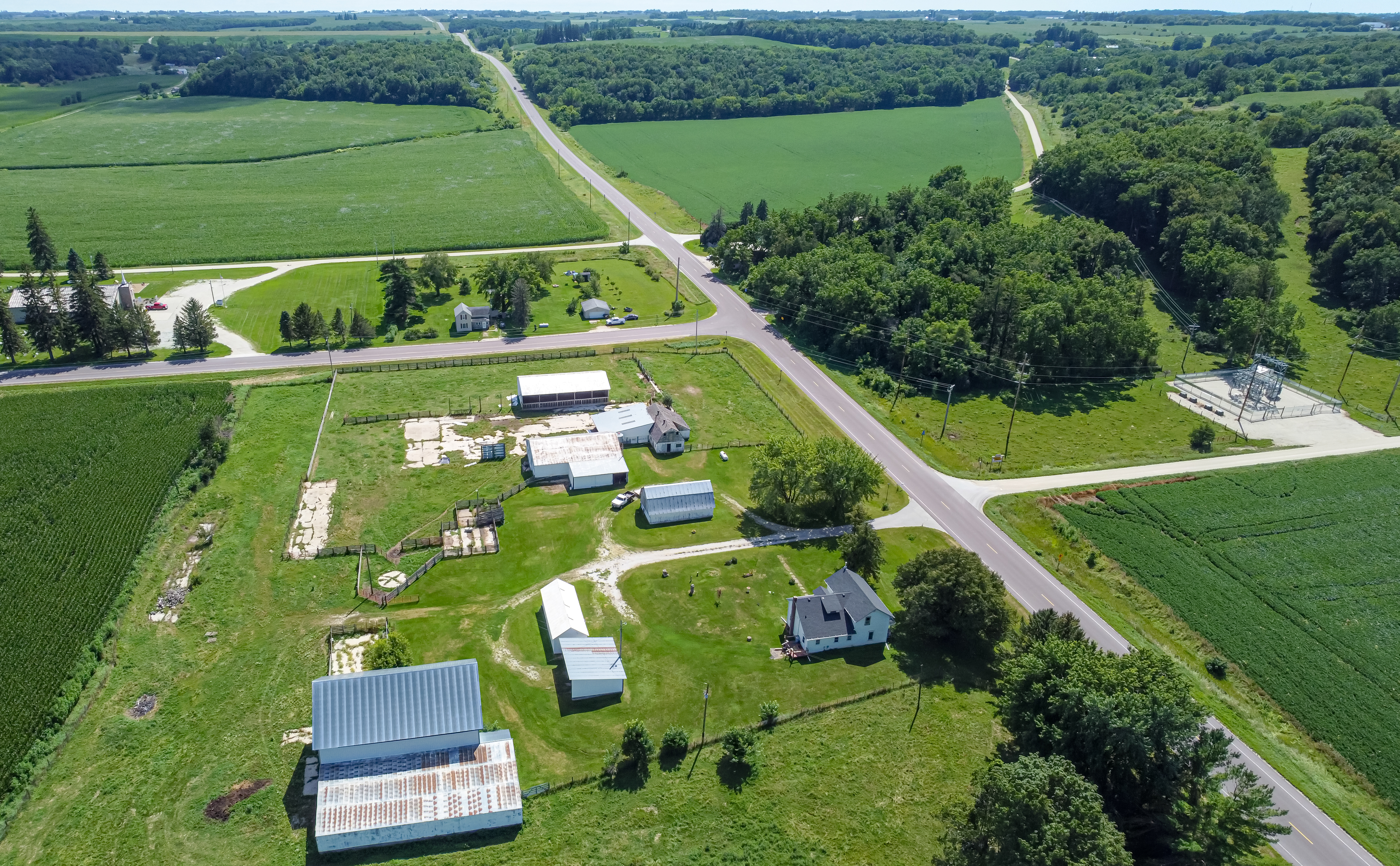

- Location within Minnesota Location within the United States
- Coordinates: 43°35′40″N 91°55′46″W
- Country: United States
- State: Minnesota
- County: Fillmore
- Elevation: 1,106 ft (337 m)
- Time zone: UTC-6 (Central (CST))
  - Summer (DST): UTC-5 (CDT)
- Area code: 507
- GNIS feature ID: 644893

Henrytown is an unincorporated community in Fillmore County, in the U.S. state of Minnesota.

== History ==
Henrytown was platted in 1854. The community was named for Henry Onstine, an early settler. The Henrytown post office closed in 1902.
