= Fillmore, Minnesota =

Unincorporated community in Minnesota, United States

Fillmore
- Unincorporated community
- Location within Minnesota Location within the United States
- Coordinates: 43°44′55″N 92°16′06″W
- Country: United States
- State: Minnesota
- County: Fillmore
- Elevation: 1,040 ft (320 m)
- Time zone: UTC-6 (Central (CST))
  - Summer (DST): UTC-5 (CDT)
- Area code: 507
- GNIS feature ID: 643627

Fillmore is an unincorporated community in Fillmore County, Minnesota, United States.

== History ==
Fillmore was founded in 1855. A post office was established at Fillmore in 1855, and remained in operation until 1905.

Historical population
Census	Pop.	Note	%±
1880	212		—
U.S. Decennial Census
