= Dream Acres =

Coordinates: 43°44′47″N 92°16′37″W

Dream Acres is a 60-acre (240,000 m^{2}) land collective located in Wykoff, Minnesota on County Road 8. Dream Acres has an organic farm. The farm hosts classes, book readings, plays and movies. There are four buildings on the property and one being built. The farm has an ox, three horses, many chickens, two sheep, cats and two rabbits. The farm grows many types of vegetables including wheat, corn, lettuce, pumpkins, broccoli, onions, beans, cucumbers etc. The farm works to maintain a level of self sufficiency. It is part of the Land Stewardship Network, listed as a Community-supported agriculture, meaning that consumers purchase subscriptions to the farm's produce and receive fresh produce delivered throughout the growing season. The farm is also a member of World-Wide Opportunities on Organic Farms WWOOF.

Dream Acres teaches classes with Tillers International throughout the year on various farm life subjects: Maple Sugaring, Woodstove Cooking, Bee Keeping, Timber Framing and Raising, Intro to Solar Applications, Farming with Oxen, Mules & Horses, Stone Masonry. The farm uses historic tools such as oxen-driven plows and a hand-crank washing machine. The farm hosts internships for anyone to come and help work on the organic farm.

== History ==
Crossing the river on Dream Acres is a wire bridge similar to the rope bridge in the end of the movie Indiana Jones and the Temple of Doom. Across the river is a pile of five cement bags which have long since cemented together. Since there was no bridge other than the wire bridge the only way to carry cement for the foundation of a building was by foot. The foundation was never completed.

Dream Acres does have four completed buildings including the house. There is a straw insulated house, a barn and another house.

In the summer of 2007, Dream Acres began construction of the first renewable energy/energy efficient certified kitchen in Minnesota. The building is a traditional timber frame, and the raising was held in July 2007. It is connected to a green house and will be supplied with running water and electricity from solar panels on the roof.

== Flourish Summer Camp in Arts and Agriculture ==
Eva Barr holds a children's summer camp each August at the farm. The children are exposed to life on a farm and different art forms for example acting in a play. Barr describes the program as "a playground for the mingling of performing arts and agriculture in an intensive week on a farm."

== See also ==
- Wykoff, Minnesota
- Fillmore County, Minnesota
- Spring Valley, Minnesota
- WWOOF
