= Jordan Creek (Minnesota) =

Stream in Fillmore County, Minnesota, U.S.

Coordinates: 43°47′04″N 92°14′50″W

Jordan Creek is a stream in Fillmore County, in the U.S. state of Minnesota.

Jordan Creek took its name from the Jordan River, in West Asia.

== See also ==
- List of rivers of Minnesota
