= Spring Valley Township, Fillmore County, Minnesota =

Spring Valley Township, Minnesota
- Township
- Location within the state of Minnesota Spring Valley Township, Minnesota (the United States)
- Coordinates: 43°42′31″N 92°23′2″W
- Country: United States
- State: Minnesota
- County: Fillmore

Area
  - Total: 32.1 sq mi (83.1 km^{2})
  - Land: 32.0 sq mi (83.0 km^{2})
  - Water: 0 sq mi (0.0 km^{2})
- Elevation: 1,299 ft (396 m)

Population (2000)
  - Total: 590
  - Density: 18/sq mi (7.1/km^{2})
- Time zone: UTC-6 (Central (CST))
  - Summer (DST): UTC-5 (CDT)
- ZIP code: 55975
- Area code: 507
- FIPS code: 27-62122
- GNIS feature ID: 0665682

Spring Valley Township is a township in Fillmore County, Minnesota, United States. The population was 590 at the 2000 census.

Spring Valley Township was organized in 1858, and named for several springs within its borders.

== Geography ==
According to the United States Census Bureau, the township has a total area of 32.1 square miles (83.1 km^{2}), of which 32.1 square miles (83.0 km^{2}) is land and 0.04 square mile (0.1 km^{2}) (0.06%) is water.

== Demographics ==
As of the census of 2000, there were 590 people, 220 households, and 176 families residing in the township. The population density was 18.4 people per square mile (7.1/km^{2}). There were 238 housing units at an average density of 7.4/sq mi (2.9/km^{2}). The racial makeup of the township was 99.15% White, 0.17% African American, 0.51% Native American, and 0.17% from two or more races.

There were 220 households, out of which 33.2% had children under the age of 18 living with them, 71.8% were married couples living together, 4.1% had a female householder with no husband present, and 20.0% were non-families. 16.8% of all households were made up of individuals, and 7.7% had someone living alone who was 65 years of age or older. The average household size was 2.68 and the average family size was 2.99.

In the township the population was spread out, with 23.2% under the age of 18, 9.7% from 18 to 24, 27.5% from 25 to 44, 28.6% from 45 to 64, and 11.0% who were 65 years of age or older. The median age was 41 years. For every 100 females, there were 100.0 males. For every 100 females age 18 and over, there were 103.1 males.

The median income for a household in the township was $47,250, and the median income for a family was $54,688. Males had a median income of $36,786 versus $26,250 for females. The per capita income for the township was $20,224. About 5.3% of families and 5.9% of the population were below the poverty line, including 5.3% of those under age 18 and 6.6% of those age 65 or over.
