= Rushford Village, Minnesota =

City in Minnesota, United States

Rushford Village
- City
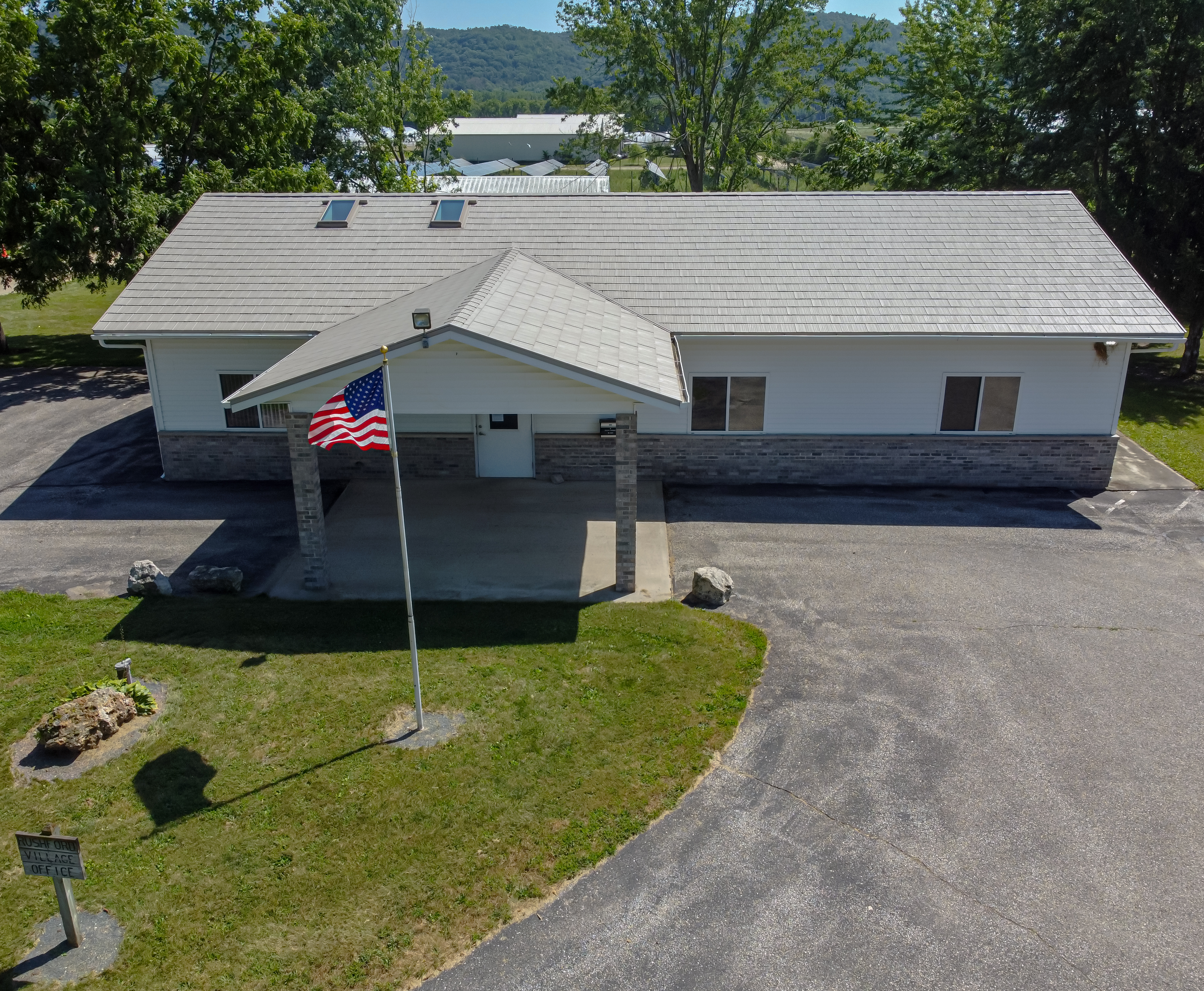
- Rushford Village Hall on MN-30
- Motto: 33 square miles strong
- Location of Rushford Village, Minnesota
- Coordinates: 43°48′10″N 91°47′01″W
- Country: United States
- State: Minnesota
- County: Fillmore

Area
  - Total: 33.73 sq mi (87.35 km^{2})
  - Land: 33.51 sq mi (86.78 km^{2})
  - Water: 0.22 sq mi (0.58 km^{2})
- Elevation: 735 ft (224 m)

Population (2020)
  - Total: 790
  - Density: 24/sq mi (9.1/km^{2})
- Time zone: UTC-6 (Central (CST))
  - Summer (DST): UTC-5 (CDT)
- FIPS code: 27-56302
- GNIS feature ID: 2396450
- Website: www.rushfordvillagemn.gov

Rushford Village is a city in Fillmore County, Minnesota, United States. As of the 2020 census, Rushford Village had a population of 790. It surrounds the city of Rushford.

== History ==
Rushford Village was first organized as Rushford Township. As a township, it was organized in 1858, and named after Rush Creek. During this period the City of Rushford incorporated as a city, so it became a separate municipal entity from Rushford Township. On July 18, 1885, Rushford Township incorporated as a village and in 1909 the village of Peterson (completely surrounded by Rushford Village) also incorporated as a village. However, a state law passed in 1973 declared all villages to be cities, so in May 1975 Rushford Village became an incorporated city.

== Geography ==
According to the United States Census Bureau, the city has a total area of 33.64 square miles (87.13 km^{2}), of which 33.42 square miles (86.56 km^{2}) is land and 0.22 square miles (0.57 km^{2}) is water.

== Demographics ==
Historical population
Census	Pop.	Note	%±
1900	1,064		—
1910	686		−35.5%
1920	663		−3.4%
1930	633		−4.5%
1940	634		0.2%
1950	612		−3.5%
1960	581		−5.1%
1970	601		3.4%
1980	688		14.5%
1990	705		2.5%
2000	714		1.3%
2010	807		13.0%
2020	790		−2.1%
U.S. Decennial Census

=== 2010 census ===
As of the census of 2010, there were 807 people, 305 households, and 250 families living in the city. The population density was 24.1 inhabitants per square mile (9.3/km^{2}). There were 325 housing units at an average density of 9.7 per square mile (3.7/km^{2}). The racial makeup of the city was 99.0% White, 0.1% African American, 0.1% Asian, and 0.7% from two or more races. Hispanic or Latino of any race were 0.6% of the population.

There were 305 households, of which 33.1% had children under the age of 18 living with them, 73.1% were married couples living together, 4.3% had a female householder with no husband present, 4.6% had a male householder with no wife present, and 18.0% were non-families. 14.8% of all households were made up of individuals, and 8.9% had someone living alone who was 65 years of age or older. The average household size was 2.65 and the average family size was 2.91.

The median age in the city was 43.5 years. 23.7% of residents were under the age of 18; 7.1% were between the ages of 18 and 24; 21.1% were from 25 to 44; 30.7% were from 45 to 64; and 17.3% were 65 years of age or older. The gender makeup of the city was 49.9% male and 50.1% female.

=== 2000 census ===
As of the census of 2000, there were 714 people, 264 households, and 214 families living in the city. The population density was 21.4 people per square mile (8.3/km^{2}). There were 279 housing units at an average density of 8.4 per square mile (3.2/km^{2}). The racial makeup of the city was 99.02% White, 0.28% African American, 0.28% Asian, and 0.42% from two or more races. Hispanic or Latino of any race were 0.14% of the population.

There were 264 households, out of which 34.1% had children under the age of 18 living with them, 73.9% were married couples living together, 5.7% had a female householder with no husband present, and 18.6% were non-families. 15.9% of all households were made up of individuals, and 7.6% had someone living alone who was 65 years of age or older. The average household size was 2.70 and the average family size was 3.00.

In the city, the population was spread out, with 27.7% under the age of 18, 5.7% from 18 to 24, 26.5% from 25 to 44, 27.2% from 45 to 64, and 12.9% who were 65 years of age or older. The median age was 39 years. For every 100 females, there were 97.8 males. For every 100 females age 18 and over, there were 102.4 males.

The median income for a household in the city was $43,125, and the median income for a family was $50,156. Males had a median income of $36,000 versus $20,673 for females. The per capita income for the city was $18,042. About 5.1% of families and 8.0% of the population were below the poverty line, including 12.7% of those under age 18 and 1.1% of those age 65 or over.
