= Sumner Township, Fillmore County, Minnesota =

Sumner Township, Minnesota
- Township
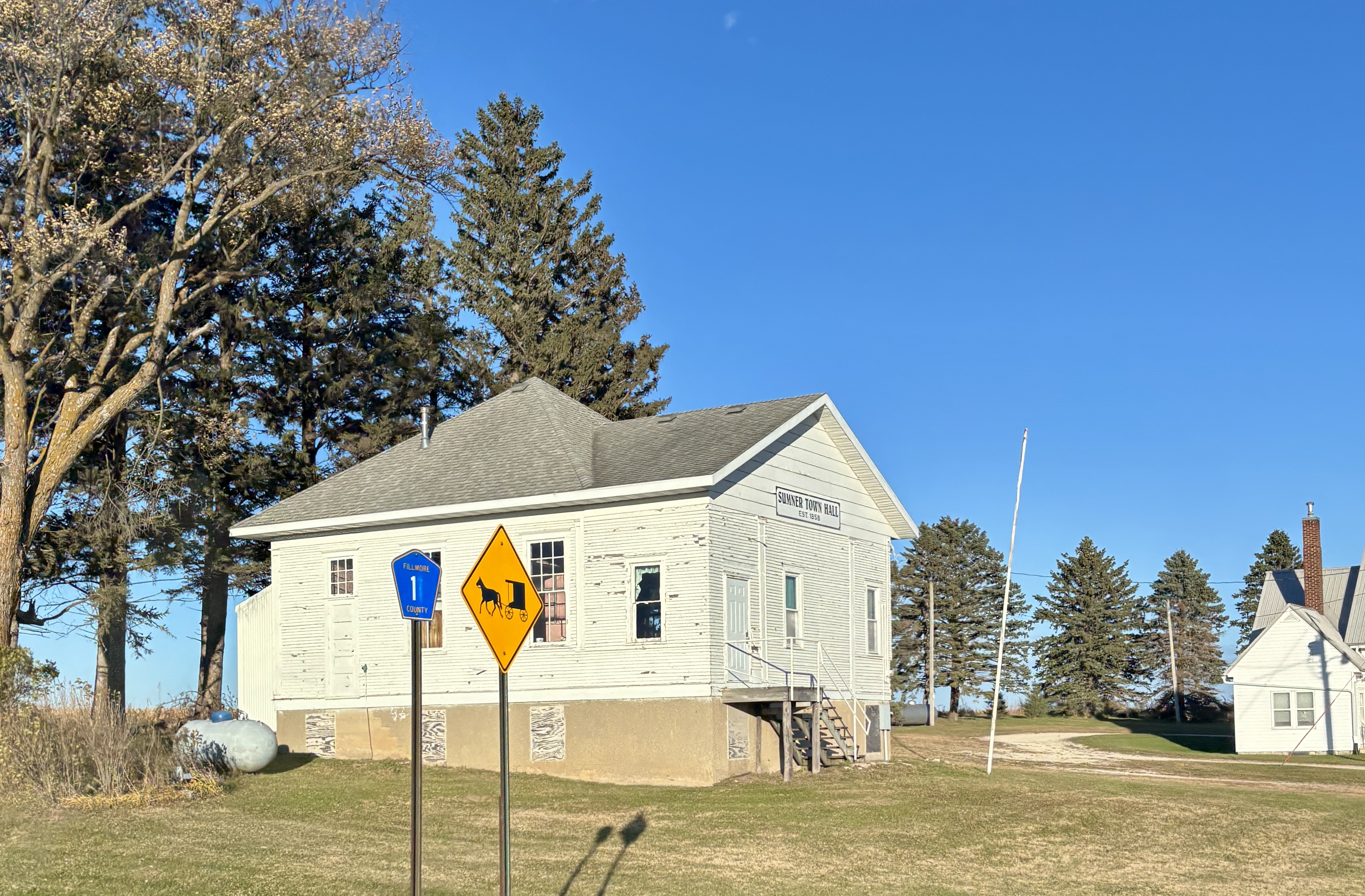
- Sumner Town Hall

- Location within the state of Minnesota Sumner Township, Minnesota (the United States)
- Coordinates: 43°47′36″N 92°22′43″W
- Country: United States
- State: Minnesota
- County: Fillmore

Area
  - Total: 37.5 sq mi (97.2 km^{2})
  - Land: 37.5 sq mi (97.2 km^{2})
  - Water: 0 sq mi (0.0 km^{2})
- Elevation: 1,273 ft (388 m)

Population (2000)
  - Total: 436
  - Density: 12/sq mi (4.5/km^{2})
- Time zone: UTC-6 (Central (CST))
  - Summer (DST): UTC-5 (CDT)
- FIPS code: 27-63418
- GNIS feature ID: 0665738

Sumner Township is a township in Fillmore County, Minnesota, United States. The population was 436 at the 2000 census.

== History ==
Sumner Township was organized in 1858, and named for Charles Sumner, a United States senator from Massachusetts.

== Geography ==
According to the United States Census Bureau, the township has a total area of 37.5 square miles (97.2 km^{2}), all land.

== Demographics ==
At the 2000 census, there were 436 people, 156 households, and 124 families residing in the township. The population density was 11.6 per square mile (4.5/km^{2}). There were 160 housing units at an average density of 4.3/sq mi (1.6/km^{2}). The racial makeup of the township was 98.17% White, and 1.83% from two or more races.

There were 156 households, of which 36.5% had children under the age of 18 living with them, 69.9% were married couples living together, 5.8% had a female householder with no husband present, and 19.9% were non-families. 14.7% of all households were made up of individuals, and 5.8% had someone living alone who was 65 years of age or older. The average household size was 2.79 and the average family size was 3.14.

The age distribution was 28.0% under the age of 18, 6.4% from 18 to 24, 28.7% from 25 to 44, 23.9% from 45 to 64, and 13.1% who were 65 years of age or older. The median age was 37 years. For every 100 females, there were 99.1 males. For every 100 females age 18 and over, there were 116.6 males.

The median household income was $44,583, and the median family income was $50,000. Males had a median income of $31,250 versus $24,375 for females. The per capita income for the township was $19,549. About 3.9% of families and 5.2% of the population were below the poverty line, including 2.1% of those under age 18 and 12.7% of those age 65 or over.
