= Newburg, Minnesota =

Unincorporated community in Minnesota, United States

Newburg
- Unincorporated community
- Location within Minnesota Location within the United States
- Coordinates: 43°34′02″N 91°48′53″W
- Country: United States
- State: Minnesota
- County: Fillmore
- Elevation: 1,086 ft (331 m)
- Time zone: UTC-6 (Central (CST))
  - Summer (DST): UTC-5 (CDT)
- Area code: 507
- GNIS feature ID: 648526

Newburg is an unincorporated community in Fillmore County, in the U.S. state of Minnesota.

== History ==
Newburg was platted in 1853. A post office was established at Newburg in 1855, and remained in operation until it was discontinued in 1902.
