= Jordan Township, Fillmore County, Minnesota =

Jordan Township, Minnesota
- Township
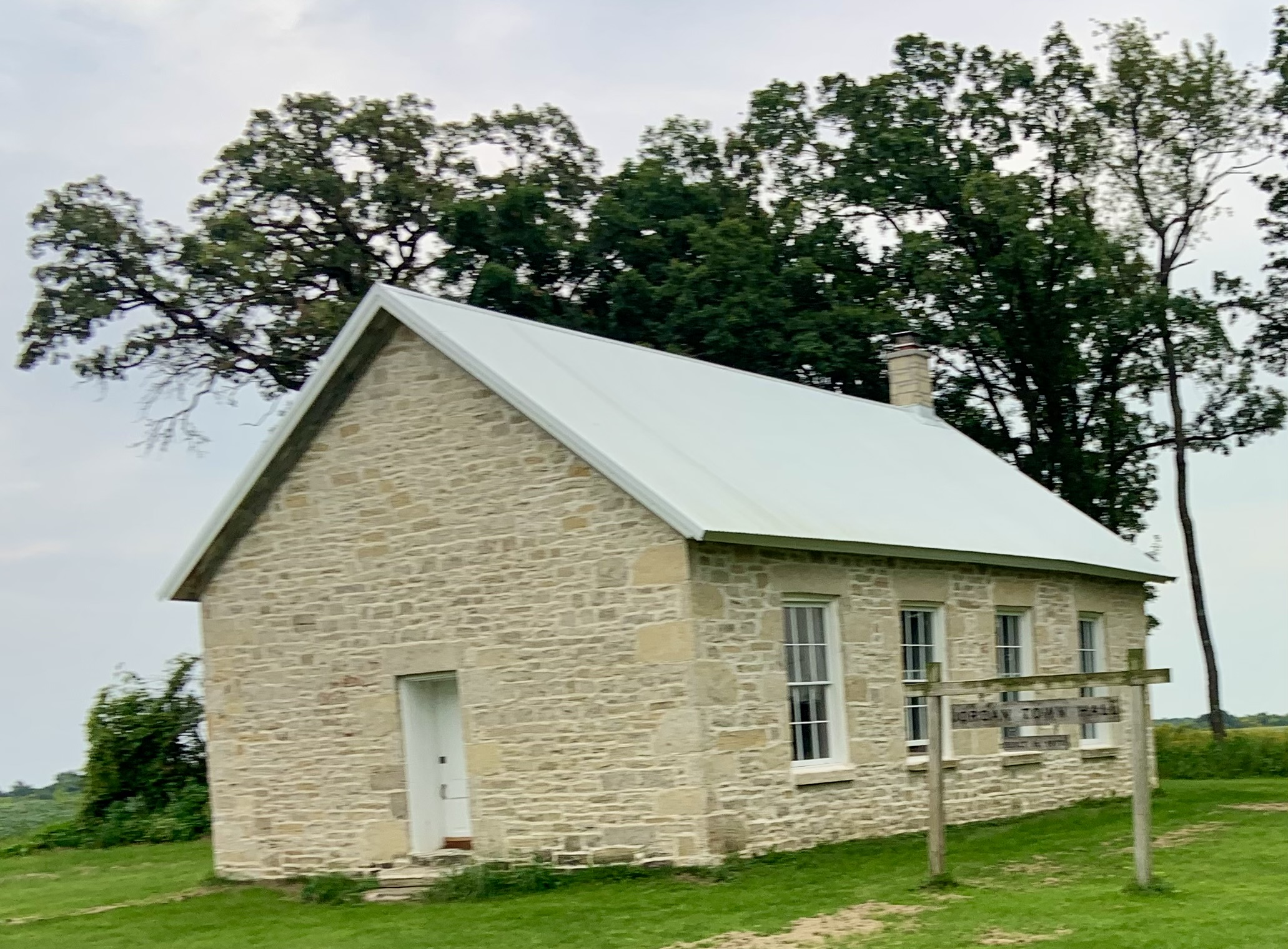
- Town hall

- Location within the state of Minnesota Jordan Township, Minnesota (the United States)
- Coordinates: 43°48′14″N 92°16′44″W
- Country: United States
- State: Minnesota
- County: Fillmore

Area
  - Total: 36.0 sq mi (93.2 km^{2})
  - Land: 36.0 sq mi (93.2 km^{2})
  - Water: 0 sq mi (0.0 km^{2})
- Elevation: 1,263 ft (385 m)

Population (2000)
  - Total: 412
  - Density: 11/sq mi (4.4/km^{2})
- Time zone: UTC-6 (Central (CST))
  - Summer (DST): UTC-5 (CDT)
- FIPS code: 27-32156
- GNIS feature ID: 0664588

Jordan Township is a township in Fillmore County, Minnesota, United States. The population was 412 at the 2000 census.

Jordan Township was organized in 1858, and named after the Jordan Creek.

Jordan Town Hall was built in 1877 by Thomas Ferguson, a Scottish immigrant stonemason.

== Geography ==
According to the United States Census Bureau, the township has a total area of 36.0 square miles (93 km^{2}), all land.

== Demographics ==
As of the census of 2000, there were 412 people, 142 households, and 112 families residing in the township. The population density was 11.5 inhabitants per square mile (4.4/km^{2}). There were 155 housing units at an average density of 4.3 per square mile (1.7/km^{2}). The racial makeup of the township was 96.60% White, 1.70% African American, and 1.70% from two or more races. Hispanic or Latino of any race were 0.24% of the population.

There were 142 households, out of which 39.4% had children under the age of 18 living with them, 73.2% were married couples living together, 2.8% had a female householder with no husband present, and 21.1% were non-families. 15.5% of all households were made up of individuals, and 4.9% had someone living alone who was 65 years of age or older. The average household size was 2.90 and the average family size was 3.29.

In the township the population was spread out, with 29.1% under the age of 18, 6.1% from 18 to 24, 26.5% from 25 to 44, 29.1% from 45 to 64, and 9.2% who were 65 years of age or older. The median age was 38 years. For every 100 females, there were 99.0 males. For every 100 females age 18 and over, there were 104.2 males.

The median income for a household in the township was $47,019, and the median income for a family was $47,917. Males had a median income of $31,250 versus $23,750 for females. The per capita income for the township was $16,843. About 5.2% of families and 7.5% of the population were below the poverty line, including 8.6% of those under age 18 and 14.6% of those age 65 or over.
