= Newburg Township, Fillmore County, Minnesota =

Newburg Township, Minnesota
- Township
- Location within the state of Minnesota Newburg Township, Minnesota (the United States)
- Coordinates: 43°33′26″N 91°46′50″W
- Country: United States
- State: Minnesota
- County: Fillmore

Area
  - Total: 35.4 sq mi (91.7 km^{2})
  - Land: 35.4 sq mi (91.7 km^{2})
  - Water: 0 sq mi (0.0 km^{2})
- Elevation: 1,171 ft (357 m)

Population (2000)
  - Total: 444
  - Density: 12/sq mi (4.8/km^{2})
- Time zone: UTC-6 (Central (CST))
  - Summer (DST): UTC-5 (CDT)
- FIPS code: 27-45466
- GNIS feature ID: 0665091

Newburg Township is a township in Fillmore County, Minnesota, United States. The population was 444 at the 2000 census.

Newburg Township was organized in 1858, and named after the community of Newburg.

== Geography ==
According to the United States Census Bureau, the township has a total area of 35.4 square miles (91.7 km^{2}), all land.

== Demographics ==
As of the census of 2000, there were 444 people, 175 households, and 119 families residing in the township. The population density was 12.5 people per square mile (4.8/km^{2}). There were 192 housing units at an average density of 5.4/sq mi (2.1/km^{2}). The racial makeup of the township was 99.32% White, 0.23% Asian, and 0.45% from two or more races. Hispanic or Latino of any race were 0.23% of the population.

There were 175 households, out of which 29.7% had children under the age of 18 living with them, 62.9% were married couples living together, 3.4% had a female householder with no husband present, and 32.0% were non-families. 28.6% of all households were made up of individuals, and 10.3% had someone living alone who was 65 years of age or older. The average household size was 2.54 and the average family size was 3.15.

In the township the population was spread out, with 28.2% under the age of 18, 5.6% from 18 to 24, 23.4% from 25 to 44, 27.7% from 45 to 64, and 15.1% who were 65 years of age or older. The median age was 41 years. For every 100 females, there were 100.9 males. For every 100 females age 18 and over, there were 109.9 males.

The median income for a household in the township was $32,083, and the median income for a family was $39,286. Males had a median income of $25,278 versus $20,982 for females. The per capita income for the township was $16,960. About 4.4% of families and 5.1% of the population were below the poverty line, including 4.5% of those under age 18 and 8.1% of those age 65 or over.
