= Norway Township, Fillmore County, Minnesota =

Norway Township, Minnesota
- Township
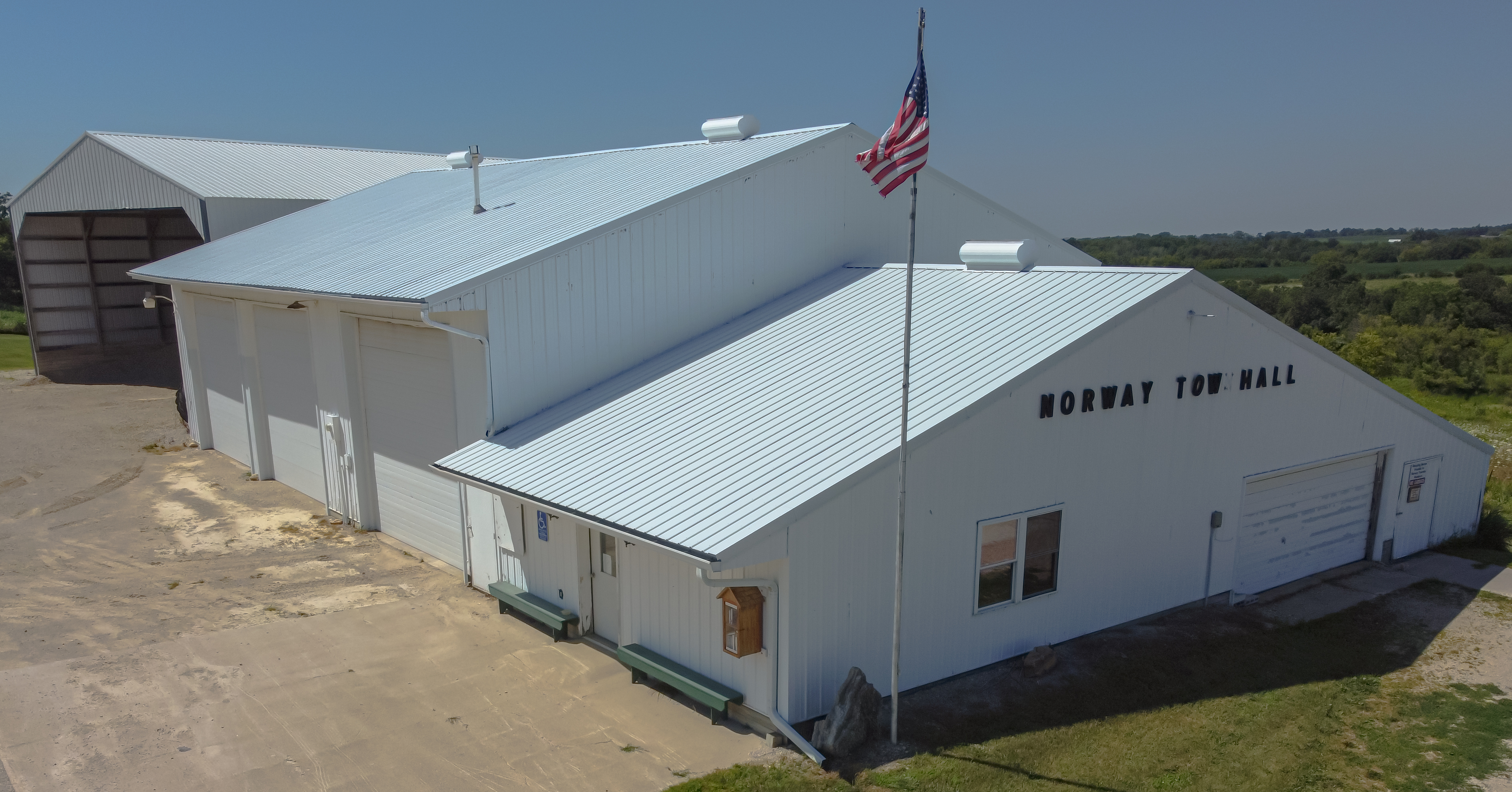
- Norway Town Hall in Bratsberg

- Location within the state of Minnesota Norway Township, Minnesota (the United States)
- Coordinates: 43°42′33″N 91°48′55″W
- Country: United States
- State: Minnesota
- County: Fillmore

Area
  - Total: 35.8 sq mi (92.7 km^{2})
  - Land: 35.8 sq mi (92.7 km^{2})
  - Water: 0 sq mi (0.0 km^{2})
- Elevation: 1,260 ft (384 m)

Population (2000)
  - Total: 335
  - Density: 9.3/sq mi (3.6/km^{2})
- Time zone: UTC-6 (Central (CST))
  - Summer (DST): UTC-5 (CDT)
- FIPS code: 27-47392
- GNIS feature ID: 0665178

Norway Township is a township in Fillmore County, Minnesota, United States. The population was 335 at the 2000 census.

== History ==
Norway Township was organized in 1860. A large share of the early settlers being natives of Norway caused the name to be selected.

== Geography ==
According to the United States Census Bureau, the township has a total area of 35.8 square miles (92.7 km^{2}), all land.

== Demographics ==
As of the census of 2000, there were 335 people, 119 households, and 93 families residing in the township. The population density was 9.4 people per square mile (3.6/km^{2}). There were 145 housing units at an average density of 4.1/sq mi (1.6/km^{2}). he racial makeup of the township was 98.51% White, 0.60% Asian, and 0.90% from two or more races. Hispanic or Latino of any race were 0.30% of the population.

There were 119 households, out of which 35.3% had children under the age of 18 living with them, 71.4% were married couples living together, 3.4% had a female householder with no husband present, and 21.8% were non-families. 16.8% of all households were made up of individuals, and 9.2% had someone living alone who was 65 years of age or older. The average household size was 2.82 and the average family size was 3.23.

In the township the population was spread out, with 29.3% under the age of 18, 9.9% from 18 to 24, 24.8% from 25 to 44, 19.7% from 45 to 64, and 16.4% who were 65 years of age or older. The median age was 34 years. For every 100 females, there were 119.0 males. For every 100 females age 18 and over, there were 113.5 males.

The median income for a household in the township was $37,000, and the median income for a family was $35,750. Males had a median income of $21,818 versus $21,250 for females. The per capita income for the township was $14,826. About 4.0% of families and 5.7% of the population were below the poverty line, including 6.5% of those under age 18 and none of those age 65 or over.
