= Chatfield Township, Fillmore County, Minnesota =

Township in Minnesota, United States

Chatfield Township, Minnesota
- Township
- Location within the state of Minnesota Chatfield Township, Minnesota (the United States)
- Coordinates: 43°47′50″N 92°8′30″W
- Country: United States
- State: Minnesota
- County: Fillmore

Area
  - Total: 34.6 sq mi (89.5 km^{2})
  - Land: 34.6 sq mi (89.5 km^{2})
  - Water: 0 sq mi (0.0 km^{2})
- Elevation: 991 ft (302 m)

Population (2000)
  - Total: 489
  - Density: 14/sq mi (5.5/km^{2})
- Time zone: UTC-6 (Central (CST))
  - Summer (DST): UTC-5 (CDT)
- ZIP code: 55923
- Area code: 507
- FIPS code: 27-11026
- GNIS feature ID: 0663787

Chatfield Township is a township in Fillmore County, Minnesota, United States. The population was 489 at the 2000 census.

== Geography ==
According to the United States Census Bureau, the township has a total area of 34.6 square miles (90 km^{2}), all land.

== Demographics ==
As of the census of 2000, there were 489 people, 181 households, and 148 families residing in the township. The population density was 14.2 inhabitants per square mile (5.5/km^{2}). There were 185 housing units at an average density of 5.4 per square mile (2.1/km^{2}). The racial makeup of the township was 99.39% White, 0.20% African American and 0.41% from two or more races. Hispanic or Latino of any race were 0.20% of the population.

There were 181 households, out of which 35.9% had children under the age of 18 living with them, 77.3% were married couples living together, 2.2% had a female householder with no husband present, and 18.2% were non-families. 14.4% of all households were made up of individuals, and 5.5% had someone living alone who was 65 years of age or older. The average household size was 2.70 and the average family size was 3.03.

In the township the population was spread out, with 26.8% under the age of 18, 4.9% from 18 to 24, 28.6% from 25 to 44, 29.9% from 45 to 64, and 9.8% who were 65 years of age or older. The median age was 38 years. For every 100 females, there were 119.3 males. For every 100 females age 18 and over, there were 110.6 males.

The median income for a household in the township was $48,182, and the median income for a family was $49,722. Males had a median income of $38,750 versus $22,589 for females. The per capita income for the township was $20,317. About 6.0% of families and 7.3% of the population were below the poverty line, including 9.1% of those under age 18 and none of those age 65 or over.
