= Amherst Township, Fillmore County, Minnesota =

Amherst Township, Minnesota
- Township
- Location within the state of Minnesota Amherst Township, Minnesota (the United States)
- Coordinates: 43°37′18″N 91°54′55″W
- Country: United States
- State: Minnesota
- County: Fillmore

Area
  - Total: 35.8 sq mi (92.8 km^{2})
  - Land: 35.8 sq mi (92.8 km^{2})
  - Water: 0 sq mi (0.0 km^{2})
- Elevation: 1,180 ft (360 m)

Population (2000)
  - Total: 405
  - Density: 11/sq mi (4.4/km^{2})
- Time zone: UTC-6 (Central (CST))
  - Summer (DST): UTC-5 (CDT)
- FIPS code: 27-01396
- GNIS feature ID: 0663428

Amherst Township (/ˈæmhərst/ AM-hərst) is a township in Fillmore County, Minnesota, United States. The population was 405 at the 2000 census.

Amherst Township was organized in 1858, and named after Amherst, Ohio, the native home of the wife of an early settler.

== Geography ==
According to the United States Census Bureau, the township has a total area of 35.8 square miles (93 km^{2}), all land.

== Demographics ==
As of the 2000 census, there were 405 people, 124 households, and 101 families residing in the township. The population density was 11.3 inhabitants per square mile (4.4/km^{2}). There were 139 housing units at an average density of 3.9 per square mile (1.5/km^{2}). The racial makeup of the township was 98.02% White, 0.49% Asian, 0.74% from other races, and 0.74% from two or more races. Hispanic or Latino of any race were 0.74% of the population.

There were 124 households, out of which 41.9% had children under the age of 18 living with them, 74.2% were married couples living together, 3.2% had a female householder with no husband present, and 18.5% were non-families. 17.7% of all households were made up of individuals, and 8.9% had someone living alone who was 65 years of age or older. The average household size was 3.27 and the average family size was 3.75.

The population was 38.0% under the age of 18, 7.7% from 18 to 24, 25.2% from 25 to 44, 19.3% from 45 to 64, and 9.9% who were 65 years of age or older. The median age was 29 years. For every 100 females, there were 114.3 males. For every 100 females age 18 and over, there were 107.4 males.

The median income for a household in the township was $27,500, and the median income for a family was $31,250. Males had a median income of $23,472 versus $20,972 for females. The per capita income for the township was $11,539. About 12.8% of families and 25.3% of the population were below the poverty line, including 39.8% of those under age 18 and 10.7% of those age 65 or over.
