= Fillmore County, Minnesota =

County in Minnesota, United States

- County
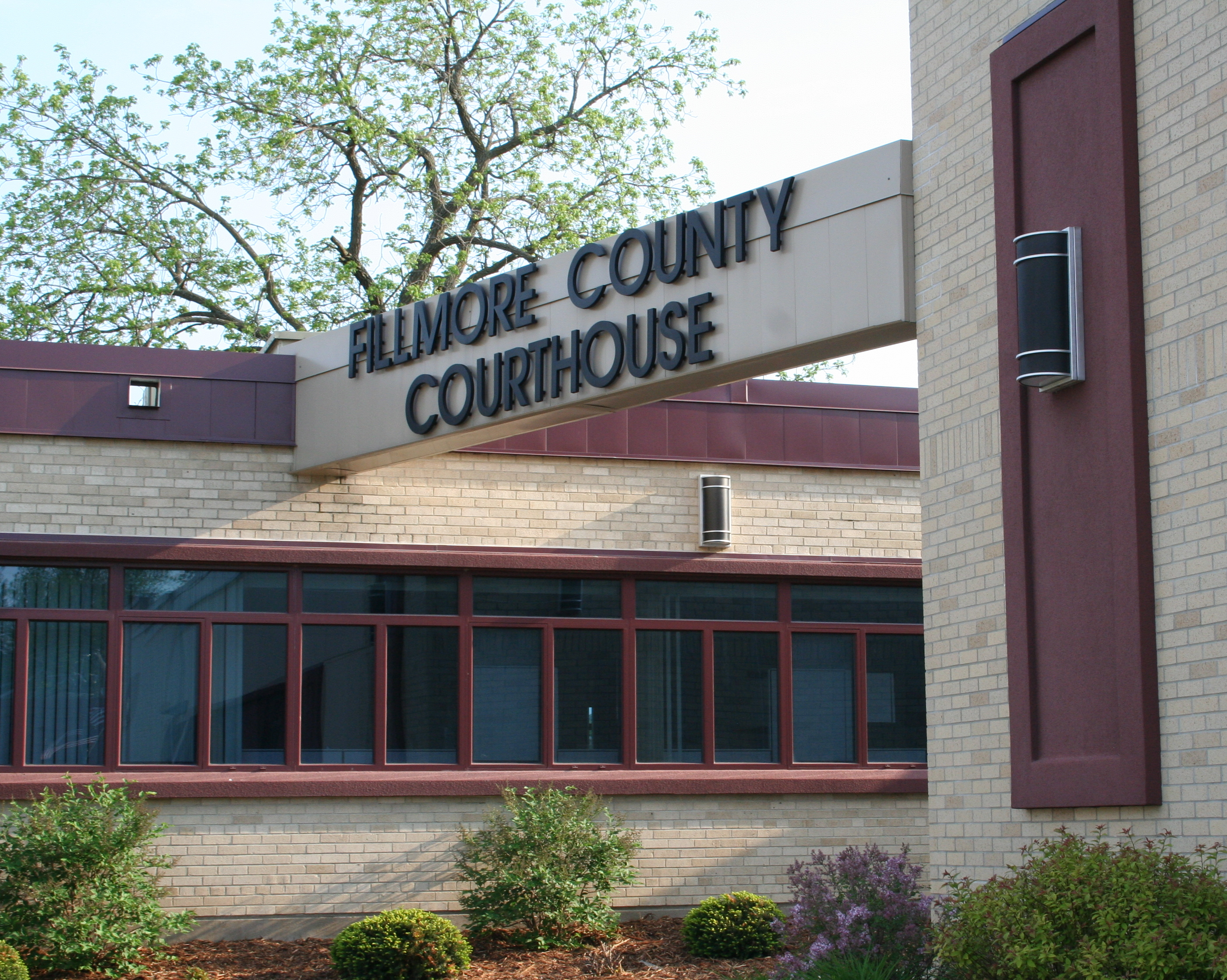
- Fillmore County Courthouse

- Location within the U.S. state of Minnesota
- Coordinates: 43°41′N 92°05′W
- Country: United States
- State: Minnesota
- Founded: March 5, 1853
- Named for: Millard Fillmore
- Seat: Preston
- Largest city: Spring Valley

Area
  - Total: 862 sq mi (2,230 km^{2})
  - Land: 861 sq mi (2,230 km^{2})
  - Water: 0.8 sq mi (2.1 km^{2}) 0.09%

Population (2020)
  - Total: 21,228
  - Estimate (2025): 21,540 ▲
  - Density: 25/sq mi (9.7/km^{2})
- Time zone: UTC−6 (Central)
  - Summer (DST): UTC−5 (CDT)
- Congressional district: 1st
- Website: www.co.fillmore.mn.us

Fillmore County is a county in the U.S. state of Minnesota. As of the 2020 census, the population was 21,228. Its county seat is Preston. Fillmore County is included in the Rochester metropolitan area.

== History ==
Fillmore County was created on March 5, 1853. It is named for Millard Fillmore, the 13th president of the United States. Fillmore County was an early destination for Euro-American settlement following the United States' 1851 treaties with the Dakota nations. Norwegian immigrants were particularly numerous. In 1860 Fillmore was Minnesota's most populous county.

== Geography ==
Fillmore County is on Minnesota's border with Iowa. The Root River drains the county, flowing eastward. The North Branch and the Middle Branch combine east of Shady Creek, while the South Branch meets their combined flow at Preston. Bear Creek drains the lower part of the county, discharging into the Root in the eastern part of the county. Willow Creek also drains a portion of the lower county, discharging into the Root at Preston. The Upper Iowa River flows eastward, mostly in adjoining Iowa counties, but briefly enters Fillmore County near the midpoint of its southern border.

The county's terrain consists of rolling hills, carved by gullies and drainages, with the available area dedicated to agriculture. The terrain slopes to the east; its highest point is on the lower western border, at 1,378 ft (420 m) ASL. The county has a total area of 862 square miles (2,230 km^{2}), of which 861 square miles (2,230 km^{2}) is land and 0.8 square miles (2.1 km^{2}) (0.09%) is water.

The county is part of the Driftless Area or Paleozoic plateau. This part of Minnesota was ice-free during the last ice age. Fillmore County also displays a karst topography.

Soils of Fillmore County

=== Major highways ===
- U.S. Highway 52
- U.S. Highway 63
- Minnesota State Highway 16
- Minnesota State Highway 30
- Minnesota State Highway 43
- Minnesota State Highway 44
- Minnesota State Highway 56
- Minnesota State Highway 74
- Minnesota State Highway 80
- Minnesota State Highway 139
- Minnesota State Highway 250
- List of county roads

=== Adjacent counties ===
- Winona County - northeast
- Houston County - east
- Winneshiek County, Iowa - southeast
- Howard County, Iowa - southwest
- Mower County - west
- Olmsted County - northwest

=== Protected areas ===
- Forestville/Mystery Cave State Park
- Mystery Cave State Park
- Pin Oak Prairie Scientific and Natural Area
- Rushford Sand Barrens Scientific and Natural Area
- Wycoff Balsam Fir Scientific and Natural Area

== Demographics ==
Historical population
Census	Pop.	Note	%±
1860	13,542		—
1870	24,887		83.8%
1880	28,162		13.2%
1890	25,996		−7.7%
1900	28,288		8.8%
1910	25,680		−9.2%
1920	25,330		−1.4%
1930	24,748		−2.3%
1940	25,830		4.4%
1950	24,465		−5.3%
1960	23,768		−2.8%
1970	21,916		−7.8%
1980	21,930		0.1%
1990	20,777		−5.3%
2000	21,122		1.7%
2010	20,866		−1.2%
2020	21,228		1.7%
2025 (est.)	21,540	▲	1.5%
U.S. Decennial Census; 1790-1960 1900-90; 1990-2000 2010-20 2025

=== Racial and ethnic composition ===
Fillmore County, Minnesota – Racial and ethnic composition Note: the US Census treats Hispanic/Latino as an ethnic category. This table excludes Latinos from the racial categories and assigns them to a separate category. Hispanics/Latinos may be of any race.
Race / Ethnicity (NH = Non-Hispanic)	Pop 1980	Pop 1990	Pop 2000	Pop 2010	Pop 2020	% 1980	% 1990	% 2000	% 2010	% 2020
White alone (NH)	21,747	20,618	20,823	20,375	20,173	99.17%	99.23%	98.58%	97.65%	95.03%
Black or African American alone (NH)	10	7	34	48	98	0.05%	0.03%	0.16%	0.23%	0.46%
Native American or Alaska Native alone (NH)	27	32	21	20	7	0.12%	0.15%	0.10%	0.10%	0.03%
Asian alone (NH)	44	49	31	71	71	0.20%	0.24%	0.15%	0.34%	0.33%
Native Hawaiian or Pacific Islander alone (NH)	x	x	0	0	2	x	x	0.00%	0.00%	0.01%
Other race alone (NH)	37	0	2	3	65	0.17%	0.00%	0.01%	0.01%	0.31%
Mixed race or Multiracial (NH)	x	x	98	142	471	x	x	0.46%	0.68%	2.22%
Hispanic or Latino (any race)	65	71	113	207	341	0.30%	0.34%	0.53%	0.99%	1.61%
Total	21,930	20,777	21,122	20,866	21,228	100.00%	100.00%	100.00%	100.00%	100.00%

=== 2020 census ===
As of the 2020 census, the county had a population of 21,228. The median age was 43.0 years. 24.1% of residents were under the age of 18 and 22.4% of residents were 65 years of age or older. For every 100 females there were 101.1 males, and for every 100 females age 18 and over there were 98.6 males age 18 and over.

The racial makeup of the county was 95.5% White, 0.5% Black or African American, 0.1% American Indian and Alaska Native, 0.3% Asian, <0.1% Native Hawaiian and Pacific Islander, 0.8% from some other race, and 2.8% from two or more races. Hispanic or Latino residents of any race comprised 1.6% of the population.

<0.1% of residents lived in urban areas, while 100.0% lived in rural areas.

There were 8,605 households in the county, of which 28.0% had children under the age of 18 living in them. Of all households, 54.7% were married-couple households, 18.2% were households with a male householder and no spouse or partner present, and 20.5% were households with a female householder and no spouse or partner present. About 29.1% of all households were made up of individuals and 14.2% had someone living alone who was 65 years of age or older.

There were 9,583 housing units, of which 10.2% were vacant. Among occupied housing units, 81.5% were owner-occupied and 18.5% were renter-occupied. The homeowner vacancy rate was 1.7% and the rental vacancy rate was 6.4%.

=== 2010 census ===
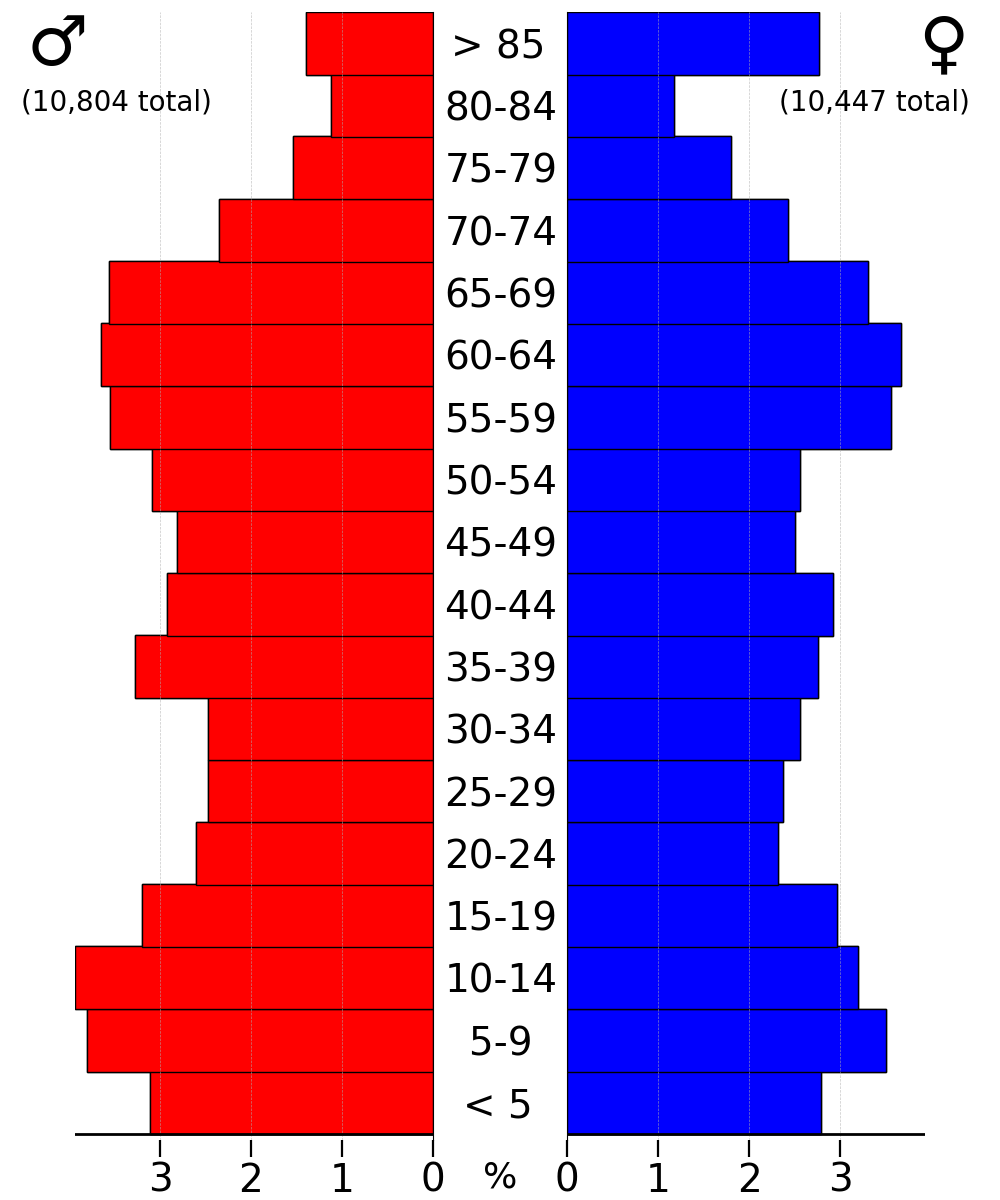
2022 US Census population pyramid for Fillmore County, from ACS 5-year estimates

As of the census of 2010, there were 20,866 people, 8,545 households, and 5,763 families in the county. The population density was 24.2 per square mile (9.3/km^{2}). There were 9,732 housing units at an average density of 11.3 per square mile (4.4/km^{2}). The racial makeup of the county was 98.2% White, 0.2% Black or African American, 0.10% Native American, 0.3% Asian, 0.3% from other races, and 0.8% from two or more races. 1% of the population were Hispanic or Latino of any race.

There were 8,545 households, out of which 29.4% had children under the age of 18 living with them, 56.4% were married couples living together, 7% had a female householder with no husband present, 4% had a male householder with no wife present, and 32.60% were non-families. 28.30% of all households were made up of individuals, and 7.32% had someone living alone who was 65 years of age or older. The average household size was 2.40 and the average family size was 2.94.

The county population contained 24.3% under the age of 18, 6.5% from 18 to 24, 21.9% from 25 to 44, 28.20% from 45 to 64, and 17.10% who were 65 years of age or older. The median age was 43 years. For every 100 females there were 97.30 males. For every 100 females age 18 and over, there were 98.80 males.

In 2010, the median income for a household in the county was $45,888, and the median income for a family was $59,034. Males had a median income of $39,239 versus $33,571 for females. 2015 estimates state the per capita income for the county was $26,348. In 2015, about 7.4% of families and 11.10% of the population were below the poverty line, including 16.50% of those under age 18 and 10.9% of those age 65 or over.

== Communities ==
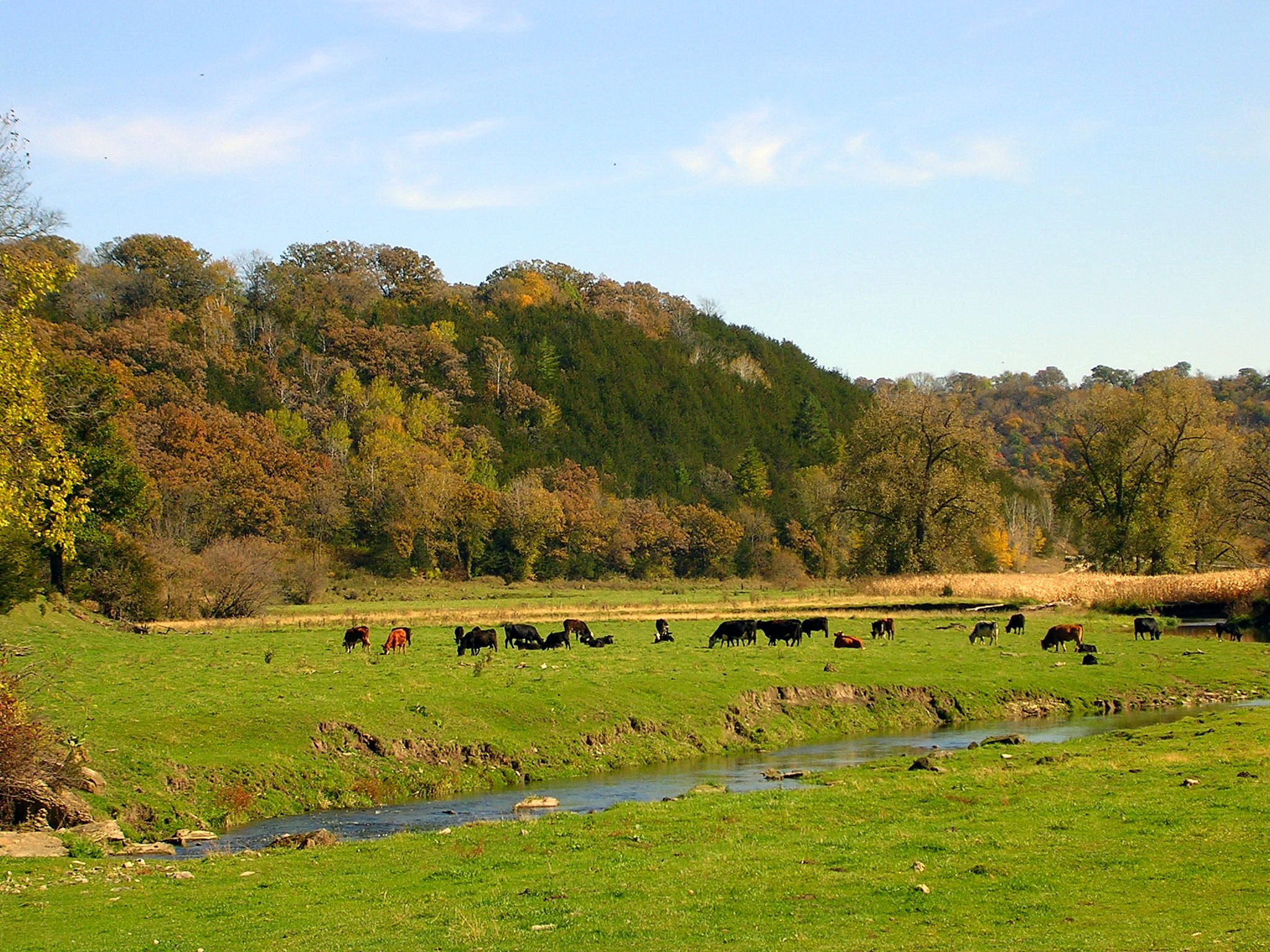
County landscape in autumn

=== Cities ===
- Canton
- Chatfield (part)
- Fountain
- Harmony
- Lanesboro
- Mabel
- Ostrander
- Peterson
- Preston (county seat)
- Rushford
- Rushford Village
- Spring Valley
- Whalan
- Wykoff

=== Unincorporated communities ===
- Bratsberg
- Carimona
- Cherry Grove
- Clear Grit
- Elliota
- Etna
- Fillmore
- Forestville
- Granger
- Greenleafton
- Hamilton
- Henrytown
- Highland
- Lenora
- Newburg
- Prosper
- York

=== Townships ===
- Amherst Township
- Arendahl Township
- Beaver Township
- Bloomfield Township
- Bristol Township
- Canton Township
- Carimona Township
- Carrolton Township
- Chatfield Township
- Fillmore Township
- Forestville Township
- Fountain Township
- Harmony Township
- Holt Township
- Jordan Township
- Newburg Township
- Norway Township
- Pilot Mound Township
- Preble Township
- Preston Township
- Spring Valley Township
- Sumner Township
- York Township

== Government and politics ==
Fillmore County's political history is fairly typical of many Yankee-settled rural counties in the Upper Midwest. In the early 1990s, the transition of the Republican Party into a party largely based around Southern Evangelicals severely alienated its historic Yankee base: Fillmore County turned to Democrat Bill Clinton in 1992, and voted Democratic in every election between 1992 and 2012. However, there was a powerful swing to Republican Donald Trump in 2016, with Hillary Clinton showing the worst Democratic performance in the county since George McGovern in 1972. Fillmore County has voted for Donald Trump by more than 20% each time.

United States presidential election results for Fillmore County, Minnesota
Year	Republican		Democratic		Third party(ies)	
Year	No.	%	No.	%	No.	%
1892	2,925	56.53%	1,346	26.01%	903	17.45%
1896	4,195	66.05%	1,939	30.53%	217	3.42%
1900	3,741	69.81%	1,364	25.45%	254	4.74%
1904	3,242	80.15%	554	13.70%	249	6.16%
1908	3,259	69.85%	1,153	24.71%	254	5.44%
1912	1,169	26.21%	990	22.20%	2,301	51.59%
1916	2,945	65.20%	1,313	29.07%	259	5.73%
1920	7,341	85.92%	899	10.52%	304	3.56%
1924	5,550	62.75%	460	5.20%	2,835	32.05%
1928	7,719	77.77%	2,143	21.59%	63	0.63%
1932	4,979	48.22%	5,166	50.03%	180	1.74%
1936	5,054	48.58%	4,764	45.79%	586	5.63%
1940	7,839	66.98%	3,826	32.69%	39	0.33%
1944	6,339	66.29%	3,183	33.29%	40	0.42%
1948	5,587	55.16%	4,414	43.58%	127	1.25%
1952	8,405	76.02%	2,612	23.62%	40	0.36%
1956	7,004	67.09%	3,427	32.83%	9	0.09%
1960	7,507	65.60%	3,926	34.31%	11	0.10%
1964	4,824	45.29%	5,813	54.58%	14	0.13%
1968	6,257	58.99%	3,918	36.94%	432	4.07%
1972	7,107	67.94%	3,155	30.16%	198	1.89%
1976	5,984	54.61%	4,758	43.42%	215	1.96%
1980	6,452	57.04%	4,010	35.45%	850	7.51%
1984	6,342	58.94%	4,351	40.44%	67	0.62%
1988	5,004	54.39%	4,114	44.72%	82	0.89%
1992	3,583	33.62%	3,977	37.31%	3,098	29.07%
1996	3,466	35.15%	4,732	47.99%	1,663	16.86%
2000	4,646	45.45%	5,020	49.10%	557	5.45%
2004	5,694	48.67%	5,825	49.79%	179	1.53%
2008	4,993	44.45%	5,921	52.71%	320	2.85%
2012	4,913	45.11%	5,713	52.45%	266	2.44%
2016	6,271	56.73%	3,872	35.02%	912	8.25%
2020	7,301	60.14%	4,551	37.48%	289	2.38%
2024	7,638	61.67%	4,491	36.26%	256	2.07%

County Board of Commissioners
Position	Name	District	Next Election
Commissioner	Mitch Lentz	District 1	2024
Commissioner	Randy Dahl	District 2	2026
Commissioner	Larry Hindt	District 3	2024
Commissioner	Duane Bakke	District 4	2026
Commissioner	Marc Prestby	District 5	2024

State Legislature (2021-2023)
Position	Name	Affiliation	District
Senate	Jeremy Miller	Republican	District 28
House of Representatives	Greg Davids	Republican	District 28B

U.S Congress (2021-2023)
Position	Name	Affiliation	District
House of Representatives	Brad Finstad	Republican	1st
Senate	Amy Klobuchar	Democrat	N/A
Senate	Tina Smith	Democrat	N/A

== Education ==
School districts include:

- Chatfield Public Schools
- Fillmore Central School District (Minnesota)
- Kingsland Public School District
- Lanesboro Public School District
- LeRoy-Ostrander Public Schools
- Mabel-Canton Public Schools
- Rushford-Peterson Public Schools
- St. Charles Public School District
- Stewartville Public School District

== See also ==
- Commonweal Theatre Company
- Dream Acres
- National Register of Historic Places listings in Fillmore County, Minnesota
