= Preston Township, Fillmore County, Minnesota =

Preston Township, Minnesota
- Township
- Location within the state of Minnesota Preston Township, Minnesota (the United States)
- Coordinates: 43°38′44″N 92°0′17″W
- Country: United States
- State: Minnesota
- County: Fillmore

Area
  - Total: 34.5 sq mi (89.4 km^{2})
  - Land: 34.5 sq mi (89.4 km^{2})
  - Water: 0 sq mi (0.0 km^{2})
- Elevation: 1,207 ft (368 m)

Population (2000)
  - Total: 374
  - Density: 11/sq mi (4.2/km^{2})
- Time zone: UTC-6 (Central (CST))
  - Summer (DST): UTC-5 (CDT)
- ZIP code: 55965
- Area code: 507
- FIPS code: 27-52468
- GNIS feature ID: 0665355

Preston Township is a township in Fillmore County, Minnesota, United States. The population was 374 at the 2000 census.

Preston Township was organized in 1858, and named after the city of Preston.

== Geography ==
According to the United States Census Bureau, the township has a total area of 34.5 square miles (89.4 km^{2}), of which 34.5 square miles (89.4 km^{2}) is land and 0.03% is water.

== Demographics ==
As of the census of 2000, there were 374 people, 112 households, and 91 families residing in the township. The population density was 10.8 people per square mile (4.2/km^{2}). There were 128 housing units at an average density of 3.7/sq mi (1.4/km^{2}). The racial makeup of the township was 98.93% White, 0.27% Asian, 0.80% from other races. Hispanic or Latino of any race were 1.07% of the population.

There were 112 households, out of which 41.1% had children under the age of 18 living with them, 78.6% were married couples living together, and 18.8% were non-families. 14.3% of all households were made up of individuals, and 7.1% had someone living alone who was 65 years of age or older. The average household size was 3.34 and the average family size was 3.81.

In the township the population was spread out, with 40.9% under the age of 18, 5.9% from 18 to 24, 22.7% from 25 to 44, 20.9% from 45 to 64, and 9.6% who were 65 years of age or older. The median age was 28 years. For every 100 females, there were 108.9 males. For every 100 females age 18 and over, there were 106.5 males.

The median income for a household in the township was $46,250, and the median income for a family was $51,250. Males had a median income of $33,750 versus $22,500 for females. The per capita income for the township was $14,134. About 14.6% of families and 18.1% of the population were below the poverty line, including 26.8% of those under age 18 and 13.8% of those age 65 or over.
