= Bristol Township, Fillmore County, Minnesota =

Bristol Township, Minnesota
- Township
- Location within the state of Minnesota Bristol Township, Minnesota (the United States)
- Coordinates: 43°32′12″N 92°8′58″W
- Country: United States
- State: Minnesota
- County: Fillmore

Area
  - Total: 36.0 sq mi (93.3 km^{2})
  - Land: 36.0 sq mi (93.3 km^{2})
  - Water: 0 sq mi (0.0 km^{2})
- Elevation: 1,342 ft (409 m)

Population (2000)
  - Total: 499
  - Density: 14/sq mi (5.3/km^{2})
- Time zone: UTC-6 (Central (CST))
  - Summer (DST): UTC-5 (CDT)
- FIPS code: 27-07804
- GNIS feature ID: 0663668

Bristol Township is a township in Fillmore County, Minnesota, United States. The population was 499 at the 2000 census.

Bristol Township was organized in 1858, and named after Bristol, in England.

== Geography ==
According to the United States Census Bureau, the township has a total area of 36.0 square miles (93 km^{2}), all land.

== Demographics ==
As of the census of 2000, there were 499 people, 161 households, and 113 families residing in the township. The population density was 13.8 people per square mile (5.3 people/km^{2}). There were 167 housing units at an average density of 4.6 per square mile (1.8/km^{2}). The racial makeup of the township was 99.60% White, 0.20% Asian, and 0.20% from two or more races.

There were 161 households, out of which 36.6% had children under the age of 18 living with them, 62.1% were married couples living together, 3.7% had a female householder with no husband present, and 29.8% were non-families. 27.3% of all households were made up of individuals, and 13.0% had someone living alone who was 65 years of age or older. The average household size was 3.10 and the average family size was 3.87.

In the township the population was spread out, with 38.1% under the age of 18, 9.0% from 18 to 24, 24.6% from 25 to 44, 16.6% from 45 to 64, and 11.6% who were 65 years of age or older. The median age was 30 years. For every 100 females, there were 116.0 males. For every 100 females age 18 and over, there were 120.7 males.

The median income for a household in the township was $33,250, and the median income for a family was $36,806. Males had a median income of $22,500 versus $22,083 for females. The per capita income for the township was $12,854. About 17.7% of families and 31.9% of the population were below the poverty line, including 50.5% of those under age 18 and 11.1% of those age 65 or over.
