= Carrollton Township, Fillmore County, Minnesota =

Carrollton Township, Minnesota
- Township
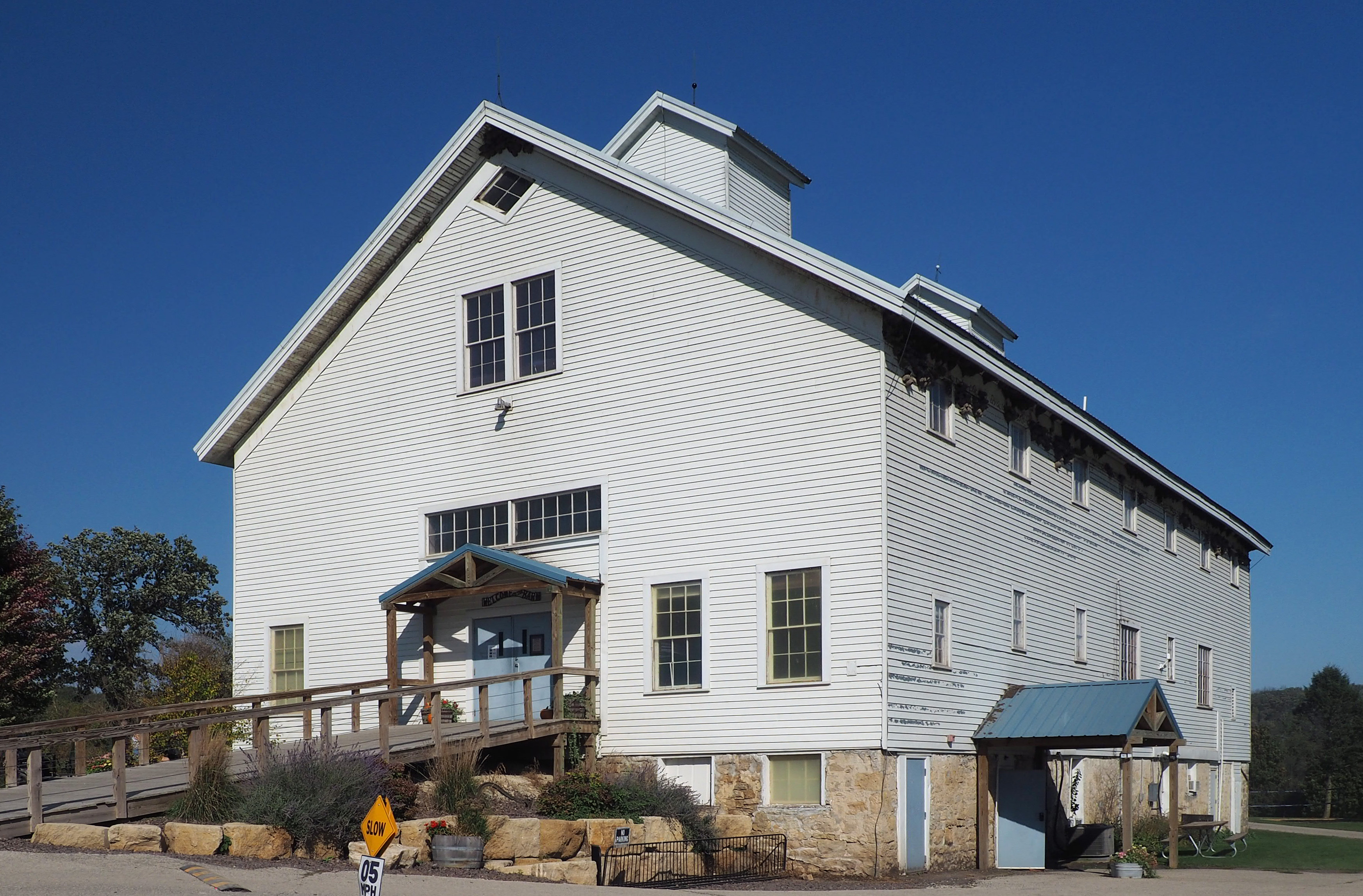
- The historic Allis Barn at the Old Barn Resort in Carrollton Township

- Location within the state of Minnesota Carrollton Township, Minnesota (the United States)
- Coordinates: 43°43′26″N 92°0′57″W
- Country: United States
- State: Minnesota
- County: Fillmore

Area
  - Total: 37.9 sq mi (98.2 km^{2})
  - Land: 37.8 sq mi (97.9 km^{2})
  - Water: 0.12 sq mi (0.3 km^{2})
- Elevation: 1,086 ft (331 m)

Population (2000)
  - Total: 321
  - Density: 8.5/sq mi (3.3/km^{2})
- Time zone: UTC-6 (Central (CST))
  - Summer (DST): UTC-5 (CDT)
- FIPS code: 27-10090
- GNIS feature ID: 0663756

Carrollton Township is a township in Fillmore County, Minnesota, United States. The population was 321 at the 2000 census.

Carrollton Township was organized in 1858, and named for Charles Carroll of Carrollton, a signer of the Declaration of Independence.

== Geography ==
According to the United States Census Bureau, the township has a total area of 37.9 square miles (98 km^{2}), of which 37.8 square miles (98 km^{2}) is land and 0.1 square miles (0.26 km^{2}) (0.32%) is water.

== Demographics ==
As of the census of 2000, there were 321 people, 113 households, and 90 families residing in the township. The population density was 8.5 inhabitants per square mile (3.3/km^{2}). There were 132 housing units at an average density of 3.5 per square mile (1.4/km^{2}). The racial makeup of the township was 99.07% White, 0.31% Asian, and 0.62% from two or more races.

There were 113 households, out of which 39.8% had children under the age of 18 living with them, 76.1% were married couples living together, 1.8% had a female householder with no husband present, and 19.5% were non-families. 12.4% of all households were made up of individuals, and 6.2% had someone living alone who was 65 years of age or older. The average household size was 2.84 and the average family size was 3.12.

In the township the population was spread out, with 31.2% under the age of 18, 5.3% from 18 to 24, 24.3% from 25 to 44, 28.0% from 45 to 64, and 11.2% who were 65 years of age or older. The median age was 37 years. For every 100 females, there were 104.5 males. For every 100 females age 18 and over, there were 112.5 males.

The median income for a household in the township was $47,981, and the median income for a family was $49,750. Males had a median income of $27,000 versus $20,156 for females. The per capita income for the township was $18,404. About 2.1% of families and 4.2% of the population were below the poverty line, including 3.7% of those under age 18 and none of those age 65 or over.
