= Preble Township, Fillmore County, Minnesota =

Preble Township, Minnesota
- Township
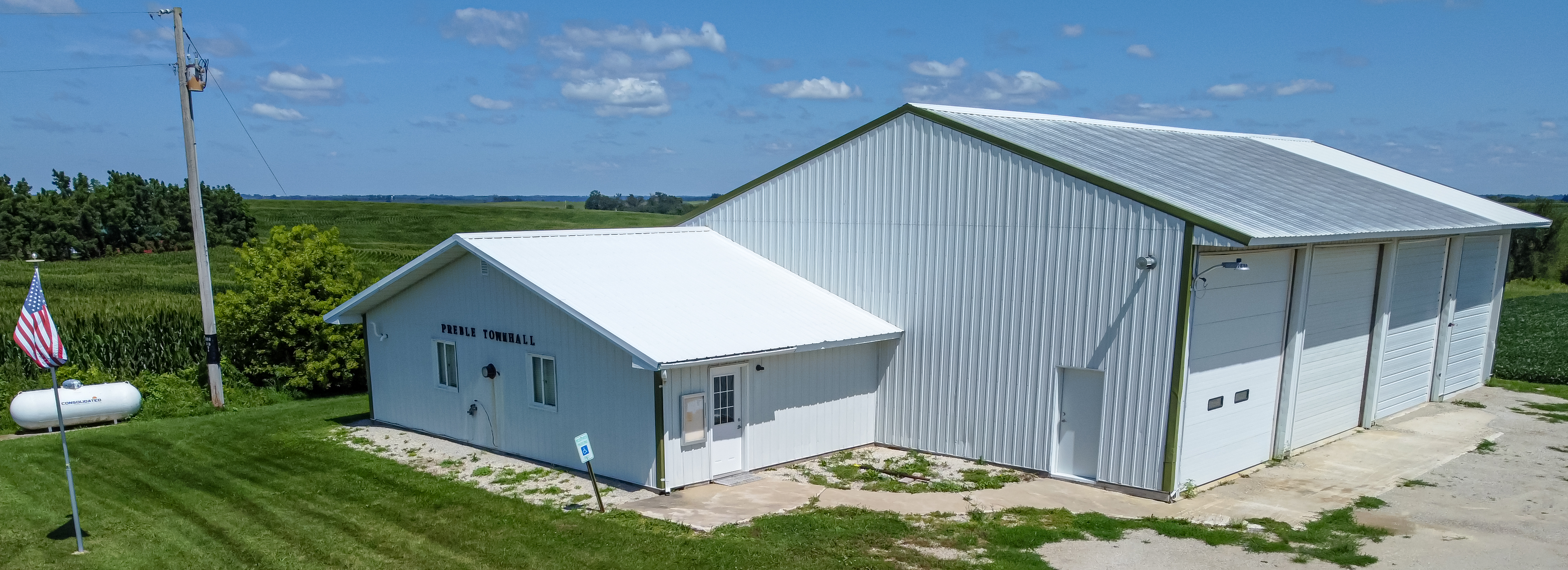
- Town hall on MN-43

- Location within the state of Minnesota Preble Township, Minnesota (the United States)
- Coordinates: 43°38′3″N 91°48′5″W
- Country: United States
- State: Minnesota
- County: Fillmore

Area
  - Total: 35.8 sq mi (92.8 km^{2})
  - Land: 35.8 sq mi (92.8 km^{2})
  - Water: 0 sq mi (0.0 km^{2})
- Elevation: 1,132 ft (345 m)

Population (2000)
  - Total: 272
  - Density: 7.5/sq mi (2.9/km^{2})
- Time zone: UTC-6 (Central (CST))
  - Summer (DST): UTC-5 (CDT)
- FIPS code: 27-52396
- GNIS feature ID: 0665352

Preble Township is a township in Fillmore County, Minnesota, United States. The population was 272 at the 2000 census.

Preble Township was organized in 1858, and named for Edward Preble, a U.S. Navy officer.

== Geography ==
According to the United States Census Bureau, the township has a total area of 35.8 square miles (92.7 km^{2}), all land.

== Demographics ==
As of the census of 2000, there were 272 people, 97 households, and 76 families residing in the township. The population density was 7.6 people per square mile (2.9/km^{2}). There were 116 housing units at an average density of 3.2/sq mi (1.3/km^{2}). The racial makeup of the township was 100.00% White.

There were 97 households, out of which 35.1% had children under the age of 18 living with them, 71.1% were married couples living together, 3.1% had a female householder with no husband present, and 21.6% were non-families. 19.6% of all households were made up of individuals, and 7.2% had someone living alone who was 65 years of age or older. The average household size was 2.80 and the average family size was 3.24.

In the township the population was spread out, with 29.4% under the age of 18, 7.7% from 18 to 24, 22.8% from 25 to 44, 26.5% from 45 to 64, and 13.6% who were 65 years of age or older. The median age was 41 years. For every 100 females, there were 91.5 males. For every 100 females age 18 and over, there were 104.3 males.

The median income for a household in the township was $36,875, and the median income for a family was $43,750. Males had a median income of $27,500 versus $16,458 for females. The per capita income for the township was $16,182. About 2.6% of families and 5.6% of the population were below the poverty line, including 2.9% of those under the age of eighteen and 11.1% of those 65 or over.
