= Holt Township, Fillmore County, Minnesota =

Holt Township, Minnesota
- Township
- Location within the state of Minnesota Holt Township, Minnesota (the United States)
- Coordinates: 43°43′8″N 91°54′24″W
- Country: United States
- State: Minnesota
- County: Fillmore

Area
  - Total: 33.0 sq mi (85.4 km^{2})
  - Land: 32.8 sq mi (84.9 km^{2})
  - Water: 0.19 sq mi (0.5 km^{2})
- Elevation: 850 ft (260 m)

Population (2000)
  - Total: 307
  - Density: 9.3/sq mi (3.6/km^{2})
- Time zone: UTC-6 (Central (CST))
  - Summer (DST): UTC-5 (CDT)
- FIPS code: 27-29852
- GNIS feature ID: 0664506

Holt Township is a township in Fillmore County, Minnesota, United States. The population was 307 at the 2000 census.

Holt Township was organized in 1858, and named for Gilbert Holt, an early settler.

== Geography ==
According to the United States Census Bureau, the township has a total area of 33.0 square miles (85 km^{2}), of which 32.8 square miles (85 km^{2}) is land and 0.2 square miles (0.52 km^{2}) (0.55%) is water.

== Demographics ==
As of the census of 2000, there were 307 people, 118 households, and 88 families residing in the township. The population density was 9.4 inhabitants per square mile (3.6/km^{2}). There were 136 housing units at an average density of 4.1 per square mile (1.6/km^{2}). The racial makeup of the township was 99.35% White, and 0.65% from two or more races.

There were 118 households, out of which 28.0% had children under the age of 18 living with them, 70.3% were married couples living together, 2.5% had a female householder with no husband present, and 24.6% were non-families. 17.8% of all households were made up of individuals, and 11.0% had someone living alone who was 65 years of age or older. The average household size was 2.60 and the average family size was 2.92.

In the township the population was spread out, with 24.4% under the age of 18, 6.2% from 18 to 24, 23.8% from 25 to 44, 30.3% from 45 to 64, and 15.3% who were 65 years of age or older. The median age was 43 years. For every 100 females, there were 114.7 males. For every 100 females age 18 and over, there were 114.8 males.

The median income for a household in the township was $37,083, and the median income for a family was $39,167. Males had a median income of $25,875 versus $20,417 for females. The per capita income for the township was $16,113. About 12.8% of families and 13.8% of the population were below the poverty line, including 23.5% of those under the age of eighteen and none of those 65 or over.

== Other Counties in Minnesota ==
- Faribault County
- Kandiyohi County
- Lyon County
- Marshall County
- Meeker County
- Saint Louis County
- Lake County
- Lake of the Woods County
- Anoka County
- Beltrami County
- Chisago County
