= Carimona Township, Fillmore County, Minnesota =

Carimona Township, Minnesota
- Township
- Location within the state of Minnesota Carimona Township, Minnesota (the United States)
- Coordinates: 43°37′20″N 92°7′37″W
- Country: United States
- State: Minnesota
- County: Fillmore

Area
  - Total: 35.6 sq mi (92.3 km^{2})
  - Land: 35.6 sq mi (92.3 km^{2})
  - Water: 0 sq mi (0.0 km^{2})
- Elevation: 1,260 ft (384 m)

Population (2000)
  - Total: 272
  - Density: 7.5/sq mi (2.9/km^{2})
- Time zone: UTC-6 (Central (CST))
  - Summer (DST): UTC-5 (CDT)
- ZIP code: 55965
- Area code: 507
- FIPS code: 27-09910
- GNIS feature ID: 0663749

Carimona Township is a township in Fillmore County, Minnesota, United States. The population was 272 at the 2000 census.

Carimona Township was organized in 1858, and named after Chief Carimona (Walking Turtle) of the Winnebago Indians.

== Geography ==
According to the United States Census Bureau, the township has a total area of 35.6 square miles (92 km^{2}), all land.

== Demographics ==
As of the census of 2000, there were 272 people, 109 households, and 85 families residing in the township. The population density was 7.6 inhabitants per square mile (2.9/km^{2}). There were 116 housing units at an average density of 3.3 per square mile (1.3/km^{2}). The racial makeup of the township was 98.90% White, and 1.10% from two or more races. Hispanic or Latino of any race were 1.10% of the population.

There were 109 households, out of which 29.4% had children under the age of 18 living with them, 73.4% were married couples living together, 1.8% had a female householder with no husband present, and 22.0% were non-families. 20.2% of all households were made up of individuals, and 11.9% had someone living alone who was 65 years of age or older. The average household size was 2.50 and the average family size was 2.85.

In the township the population was 22.8% under the age of 18, 4.0% from 18 to 24, 25.4% from 25 to 44, 29.4% from 45 to 64, and 18.4% who were 65 years of age or older. The median age was 44 years. For every 100 females, there were 101.5 males. For every 100 females age 18 and over, there were 105.9 males.

The median income for a household in the township was $39,792, and the median income for a family was $44,375. Males had a median income of $27,000 versus $22,500 for females. The per capita income for the township was $18,278. About 4.8% of families and 8.7% of the population were below the poverty line, including 10.5% of those under the age of eighteen and 13.6% of those 65 or over.
