= Arendahl Township, Fillmore County, Minnesota =

Arendahl Township, Minnesota
- Township
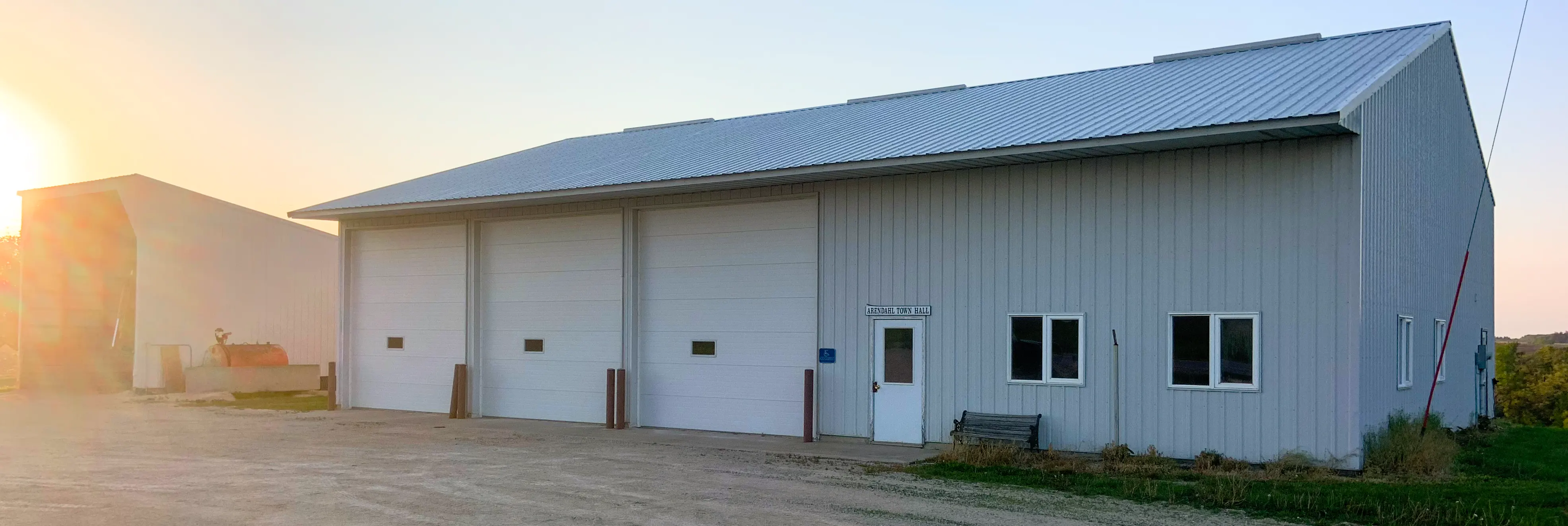
- Arendahl Town Hall

- Location within the state of Minnesota Arendahl Township, Minnesota (the United States)
- Coordinates: 43°48′32″N 91°53′56″W
- Country: United States
- State: Minnesota
- County: Fillmore

Area
  - Total: 35.8 sq mi (92.7 km^{2})
  - Land: 35.7 sq mi (92.4 km^{2})
  - Water: 0.12 sq mi (0.3 km^{2})
- Elevation: 920 ft (280 m)

Population (2000)
  - Total: 333
  - Density: 9.3/sq mi (3.6/km^{2})
- Time zone: UTC-6 (Central (CST))
  - Summer (DST): UTC-5 (CDT)
- ZIP code: 55962
- Area code: 507
- FIPS code: 27-02098
- GNIS feature ID: 0663454

Arendahl Township is a township in Fillmore County, Minnesota, United States. The population was 333 at the 2000 census.

Arendahl Township was organized in 1860, and named after the town of Arendal, Norway.

== Geography ==
According to the United States Census Bureau, the township has a total area of 35.8 square miles (93 km^{2}), of which 35.7 square miles (92 km^{2}) is land and 0.1 square miles (0.26 km^{2}) (0.34%) is water.

== Demographics ==
As of the census of 2000, there were 333 people, 118 households, and 94 families residing in the township. The population density was 9.3 people per square mile (3.6/km^{2}). There were 137 housing units at an average density of 3.8/sq mi (1.5/km^{2}). The racial makeup of the township was 99.70% White and 0.30% Native American.

There were 118 households, out of which 34.7% had children under the age of 18 living with them, 71.2% were married couples living together, 2.5% had a female householder with no husband present, and 20.3% were non-families. 15.3% of all households were made up of individuals, and 5.9% had someone living alone who was 65 years of age or older. The average household size was 2.82 and the average family size was 3.19.

In the township the population was spread out, with 27.6% under the age of 18, 4.5% from 18 to 24, 27.9% from 25 to 44, 22.5% from 45 to 64, and 17.4% who were 65 years of age or older. The median age was 40 years. For every 100 females, there were 98.2 males. For every 100 females age 18 and over, there were 117.1 males.

The median income for a household in the township was $42,500, and the median income for a family was $45,417. Males had a median income of $29,688 versus $25,250 for females. The per capita income for the township was $16,915. About 6.5% of families and 10.1% of the population were below the poverty line, including 17.3% of those under age 18 and 4.6% of those age 65 or over.
