= Canton Township, Fillmore County, Minnesota =

Canton Township, Minnesota
- Township
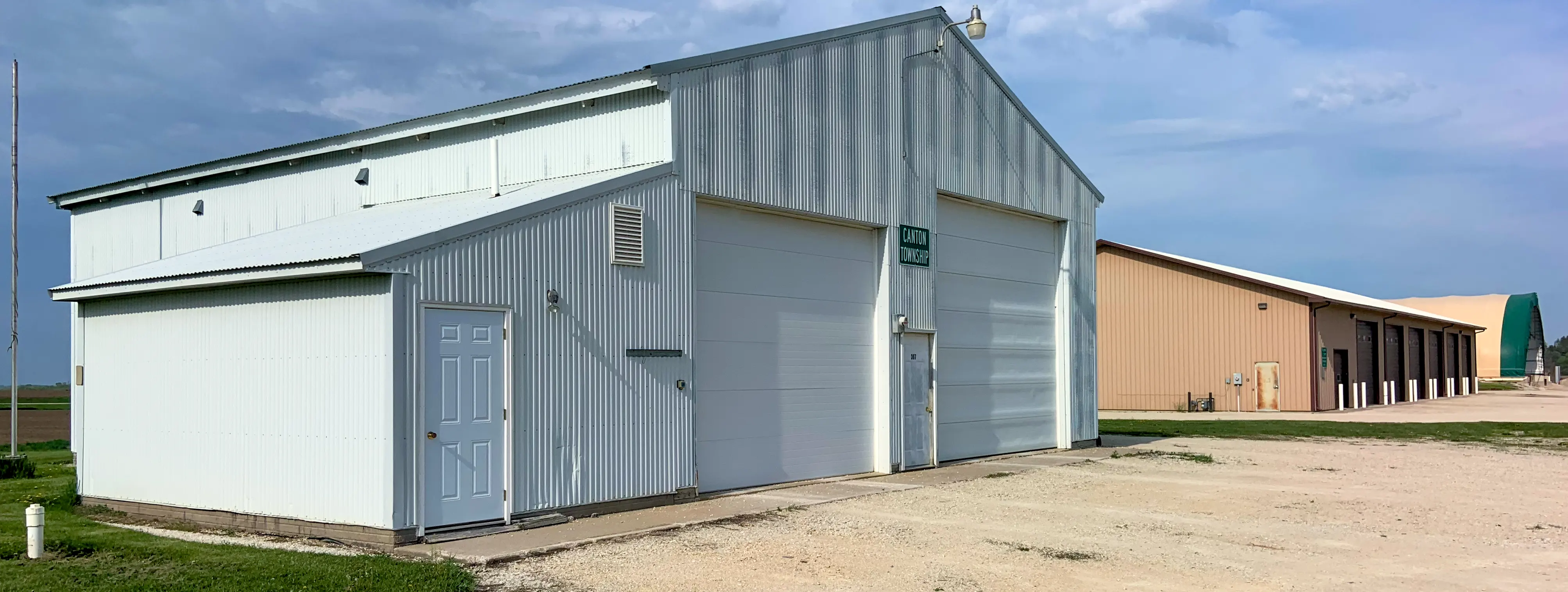
- Canton Town Hall

- Location within the state of Minnesota Canton Township, Minnesota (the United States)
- Coordinates: 43°32′33″N 91°55′18″W
- Country: United States
- State: Minnesota
- County: Fillmore

Area
  - Total: 35.1 sq mi (90.9 km^{2})
  - Land: 35.1 sq mi (90.9 km^{2})
  - Water: 0 sq mi (0.0 km^{2})
- Elevation: 1,286 ft (392 m)

Population (2000)
  - Total: 684
  - Density: 19/sq mi (7.5/km^{2})
- Time zone: UTC-6 (Central (CST))
  - Summer (DST): UTC-5 (CDT)
- ZIP code: 55922
- Area code: 507
- FIPS code: 27-09820
- GNIS feature ID: 0663747

Canton Township is a township in Fillmore County, Minnesota, United States. The population was 684 at the 2000 census.

== History ==
Canton Township was organized in 1858, and named after Canton, Ohio.

== Geography ==
According to the United States Census Bureau, the township has a total area of 35.1 square miles (91 km^{2}), all land.

== Demographics ==
As of the census of 2000, there were 684 people, 184 households, and 149 families residing in the township. The population density was 19.5 inhabitants per square mile (7.5/km^{2}). There were 205 housing units at an average density of 5.8 per square mile (2.2/km^{2}). The racial makeup of the township was 97.51% White, 0.15% African American, 0.15% Asian, and 2.19% from two or more races. Hispanic or Latino of any race were 1.90% of the population.

There were 184 households, out of which 47.3% had children under the age of 18 living with them, 74.5% were married couples living together, 6.0% had a female householder with no husband present, and 18.5% were non-families. 15.8% of all households were made up of individuals, and 8.2% had someone living alone who was 65 years of age or older. The average household size was 3.72 and the average family size was 4.27.

In the township the population was spread out, with 43.4% under the age of 18, 10.4% from 18 to 24, 22.1% from 25 to 44, 14.8% from 45 to 64, and 9.4% who were 65 years of age or older. The median age was 22 years. For every 100 females, there were 103.0 males. For every 100 females age 18 and over, there were 102.6 males.

The median income for a household in the township was $31,429, and the median income for a family was $34,896. Males had a median income of $21,250 versus $16,250 for females. The per capita income for the township was $9,594. About 23.1% of families and 37.1% of the population were below the poverty line, including 52.7% of those under age 18 and 16.1% of those age 65 or over.
