= Pine Creek (Rush Creek tributary) =

River in Minnesota

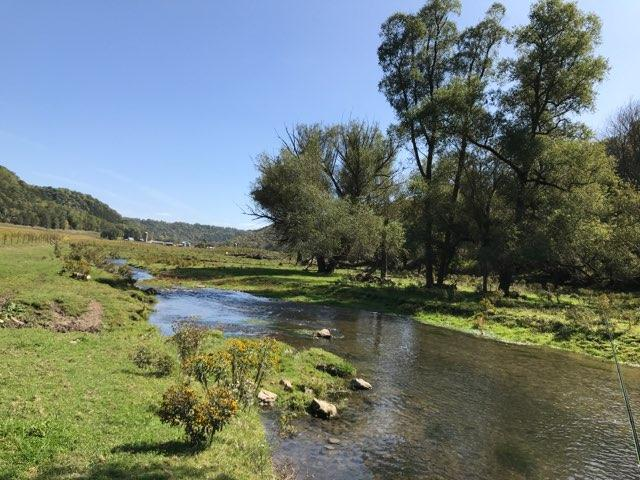
- Section of Pine Creek

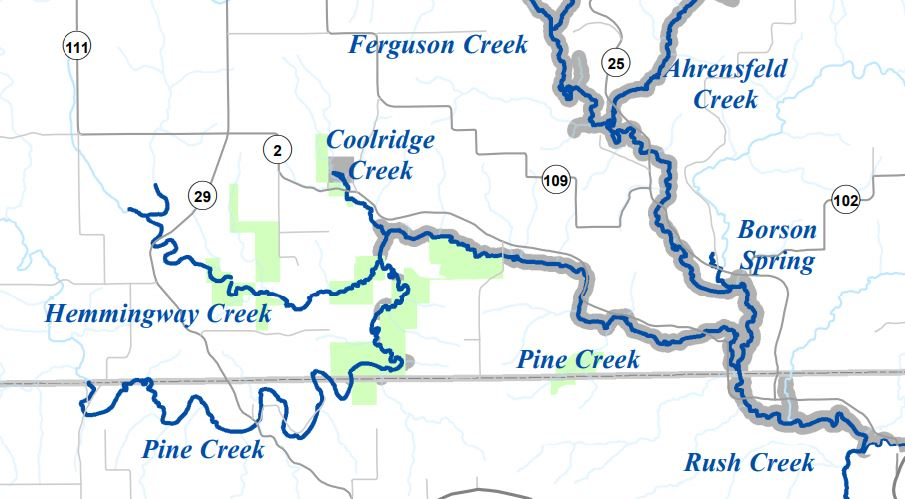
- main section of Pine Creek showing tributaries

- Mouth of Pine Creek

Location
- Countries: United States
- States: Minnesota
- Counties: Winona, Fillmore

Physical characteristics
- Source
  - location: St. Charles Township, Winona County, Minnesota
  - coordinates: 43.944427925898594°N 91.9049168509712°W
- Mouth: Rush Creek
  - location: Rushford, Minnesota
  - coordinates: 43.8477416°N 91.7976499°W

Basin features
- River system: Root River
- Tributaries
  - left: Hemminingway Creek, Coolrdige Creek
- Bridges: School Section Road and Rt. 25 bridges

Pine Creek is a stream in Fillmore and Winona counties, in the U.S. state of Minnesota. It is a tributary of the Rush Creek, which is a tributary of the Root River. It joins the Rush Creek in the extreme north of Rushford, Minnesota. Tributaries of Pine Creek are Cooledge Creek and Hemmingway Creek.

== Habitat ==
Pine Creek meanders through rural farmland in southern Winona and northern Filmore Counties. According to the Minnesota Department of Natural resources, the species of fish present include brown trout, brook trout, white sucker, northern hog sucker, creek chub, longnose dace, blacknose dace, fantail darter, slimy sculpin, mottled sculpin, and brook stickleback.

Rush Creek suffered severe flooding in the Southeast Minnesota floods of August 18–20, 2007. The fish habitat and floodplain in sections of Pine Creek were restored in 2015 by the Minnesota Trout Unlimited.

== Extents ==
The Pine Creek source is located in St. Charles Township, just below Interstate 90. It meanders south to Fillmore County before heading north where it runs east in Winona County along Winona County Road 2 and meets up with the Rush Creek in Winona County north of Rushford, Minnesota.

A bridge was built over Pine Creek on School Section Road in 2002.

Note: There are two Pine Creeks in Winona County. This Pine Creek is west of State Highway 43. It is sometimes called Fillmore County Pine Creek.The other Pine Creek (Mississippi River tributary) is in the east end of Winona County and Houston County.

=== Tributaries ===
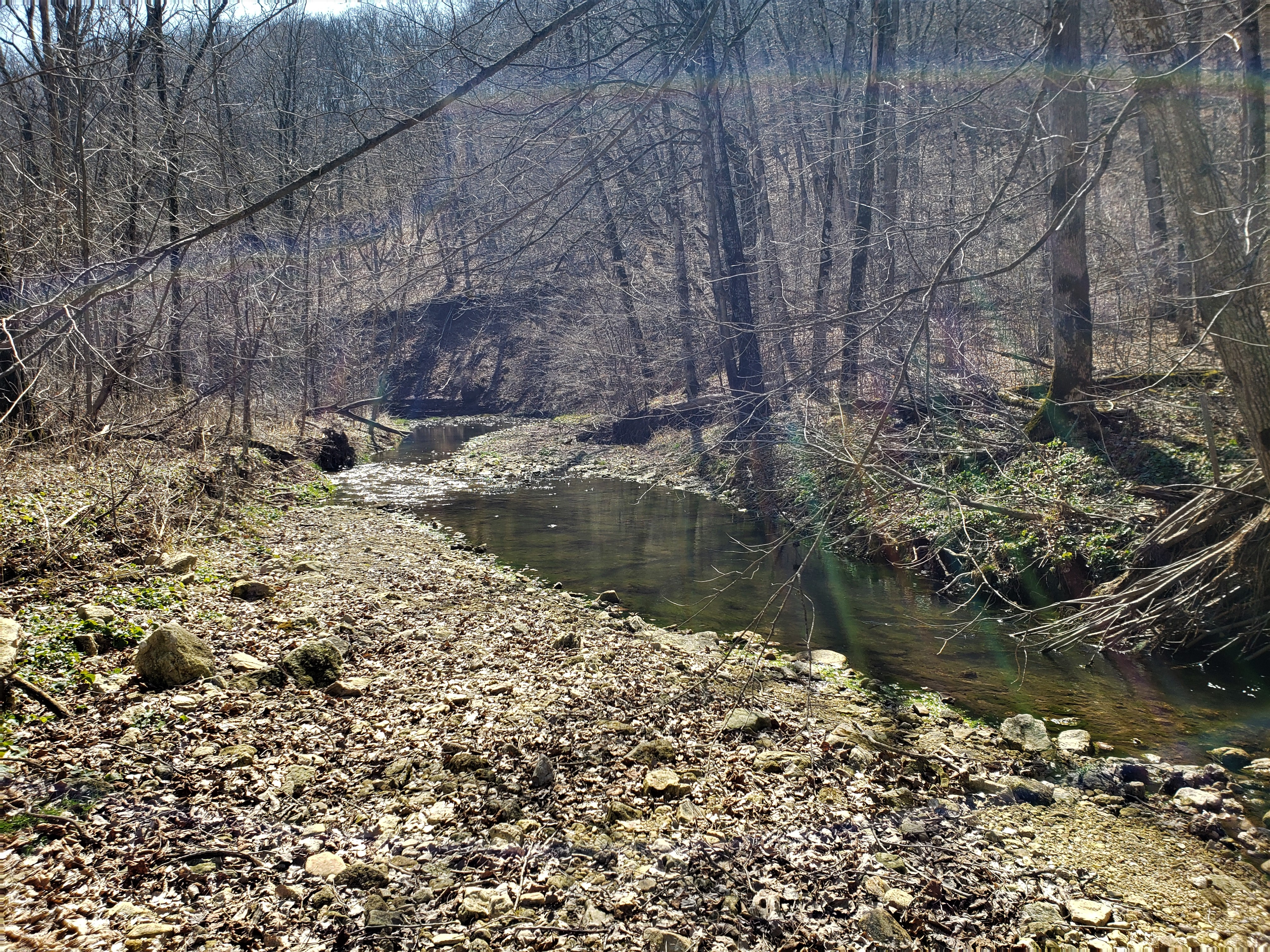
Coolridge Creek, Winona County, Minnesota

There are two small tributaries of Pine Creek, Coolridge Creek with a length of 1.23 miles and Hemingway Creek with a length of 2.19 miles. Brown trout, brook trout, creek chub, blacknose dace, longnose dace, central stoneroller, slimy sculpin, white sucker, and brook stickleback are present in both tributaries. The Minnesota Department of Natural Resources conducted a study using Coolridge and Hemingway Creeks to investigate the effects of brown trout on native brook trout. Brown trout were kept out of Coolridge Creek and the natural migration of brown trout from Pine Creek to Hemingway Creek was allowed to continue during the experiment. An increase in growth rate and survival was noted in Coolridge Creek but the mature size of the brook trout was not appreciably different from the Hemingway Creek where brown trout were allowed.
