= Root River State Trail =

Rail trail system in Minnesota

Coordinates: 43.711155°N 92.042778°W

Root River and Harmony-Preston State Trails
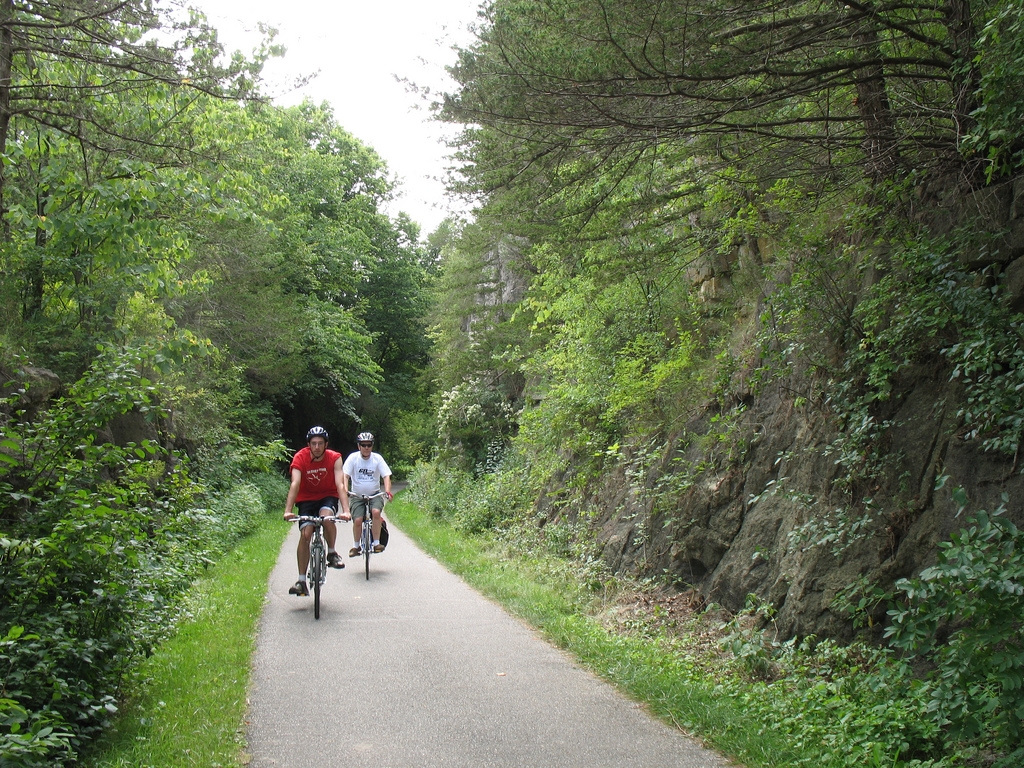
- Two cyclists approaching Lanesboro from the west. (August 2007)
- Length: Root River Trail: 42.3 mi (68.1 km); Preston-Harmony Trail: 17.8 mi (28.6 km)
- Location: Southeast Minnesota, Fillmore, Olmsted, and Houston counties
- Established: 1988
- Designation: Minnesota state trail
- Trailheads: Fountain (West), Houston (East); Preston, Minnesota, Harmony (South)
- Use: hiking, cycling, in-line skating, skiing
- Elevation gain/loss: +728 ft (222 m) from Lanesboro to Fountain
- Difficulty: Two Stars
- Season: Year round
- Sights: Lanesboro, Aroma Pie Shoppe (Whalan), Camp Creek, Lanesboro Museum, Preston Trailhead Park, South Branch of Root River, Root River, Houston Nature Center, Peterson Station Museum
- Surface: asphalt
- Right of way: Chicago, Milwaukee, St. Paul and Pacific Railroad

Root River State Trail and Harmony-Preston State Trail (collectively part of the Blufflands State Trail System) are a 60-mile (97 km) paved multi-use rail trail system in the driftless area of southeast Minnesota. The trail system consists of two main segments, the Root River segment, and Harmony-Preston Valley segment. The trails are used mainly for bicycling, hiking, and inline skating in the summer, and for cross country skiing in the winter. Much of the trail, especially the Root River segment, is built along a former Milwaukee Road (Chicago, Milwaukee, St. Paul and Pacific Railroad) railbed following the contours of the Root River valley. The trail was originally paved in the 1980s, and repaved by June 2008.

== History ==
The Root River State Trail was initially authorized by the Minnesota State Legislature in 1971. The state of Minnesota bought 49 miles of abandoned rail bed in 1981 for $975,000. The Root River State Trail was built on 35 mi (56 km) of this acquisition. Development of the trail started in 1985 and was completed in 1988 with the $2M in state bonds. The trail was extended from Rushford to Houston in 1998. In 2011, a plan was developed in the legislature to extend the trail 18 mi (29 km) to La Crescent through Hokah. As of 2026, no further progress past Houston has been made. However, in 2026, funding has been allocated for an extension from Preston west to Forestville, first planned in 2003 and revisited in 2025.

== See also ==
- Historic Bluff Country Scenic Byway
- List of rivers of Minnesota
Root River and Harmony-Preston State Trails (Blufflands State Trails)

== Root River segment ==
42.3 miles (68.1 km) in length, the trail runs predominantly east/west, following the meanders of the Root River for much of the distance. Because most of this trail segment was constructed on an abandoned rail grade, most of the inclines and curves are quite gradual. The trail end points are at the intersection of County Highway 8 and Maple Street in Fountain and West Plum Street in Houston.

The trail intersects six towns along the way:

- 0 miles (0 km) - Fountain, Minnesota (western terminus of trail segment), elevation: 1,306 ft (398 m)
- 6.5 miles (10.5 km) - junction with Harmony-Preston Valley segment
- 11.2 miles (18.0 km) - Lanesboro, Minnesota, elevation: 856 ft (261 m)
- 15.8 miles (25.4 km) - Whalan, Minnesota, elevation: 791 ft (241 m)
- 24.7 miles (39.8 km) - Peterson, Minnesota, elevation: 761 ft (232 m)
- 29.5 miles (47.5 km) - Rushford, Minnesota, elevation: 728 ft (222 m)
- 42.3 miles (68.1 km) - Houston, Minnesota (eastern terminus of trail segment), elevation: 686 ft (209 m)

== Harmony-Preston Valley segment ==
17.8 miles (28.6 km) in length, the trail runs predominantly north–south. The trail follows the Root River only from the junction to Preston. South of Preston, the trail is no longer built on a former rail grade, causing the inclines to be steeper in areas. Nearing Harmony, the trail begins to form sharp right angles as it cuts between existing farm fields and properties. The trail endpoints are the Root River State Trail junction northeast of Preston and the Harmony Visitor Center in Harmony.

This segment of the trail intersects two towns:

- 0 miles (0 km) - junction with Root River segment (northern terminus of trail segment)
- 5.5 miles (8.9 km) - Preston, Minnesota, elevation: 958 ft (292 m)
- 17.8 miles (28.6 km) - Harmony, Minnesota (southern terminus of trail segment), elevation: 1,352 ft (412 m)
