= Root River (Minnesota) =

Minnesota tributary of the Mississippi River

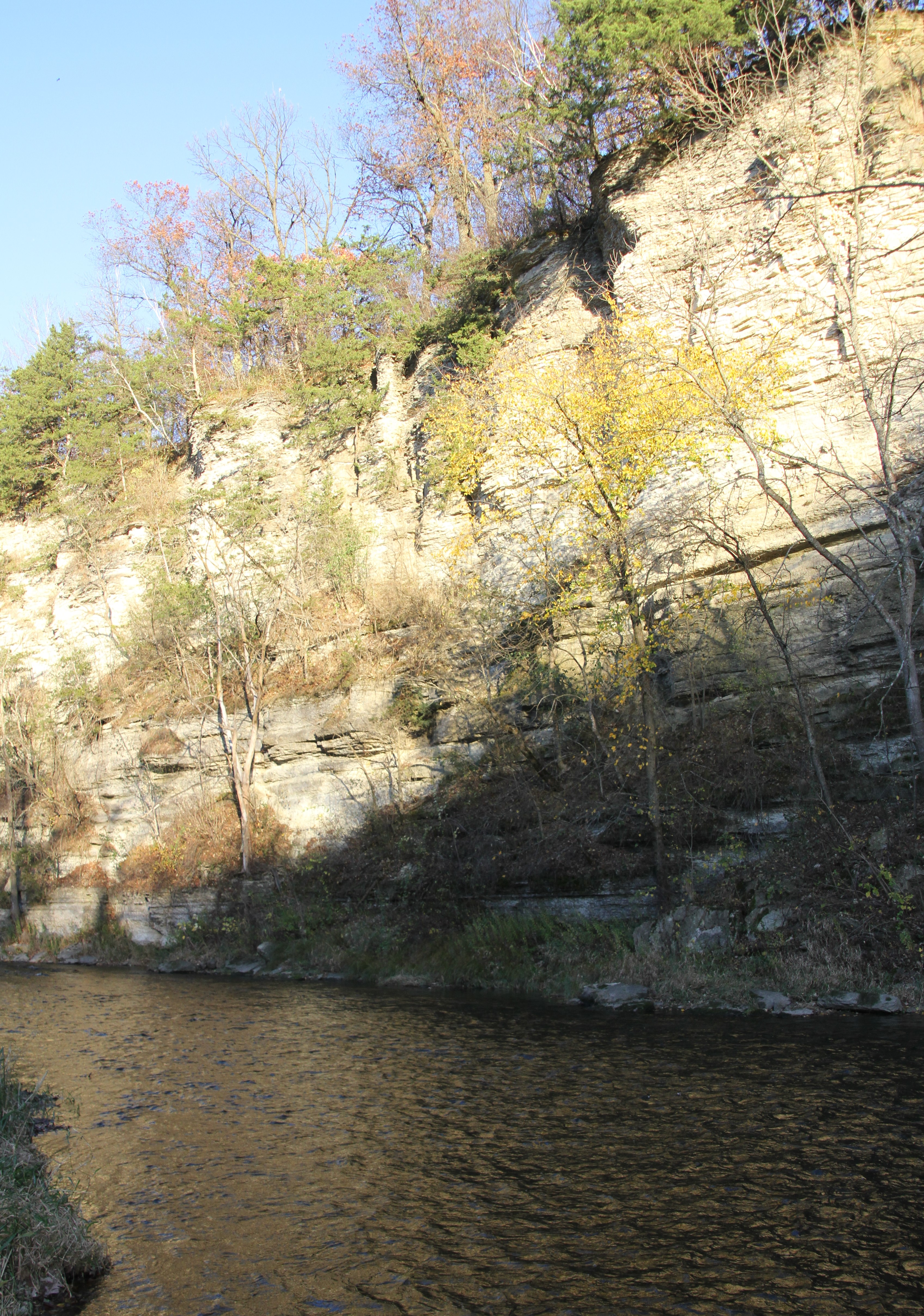
- The North Branch of the Root River in Olmsted County Park

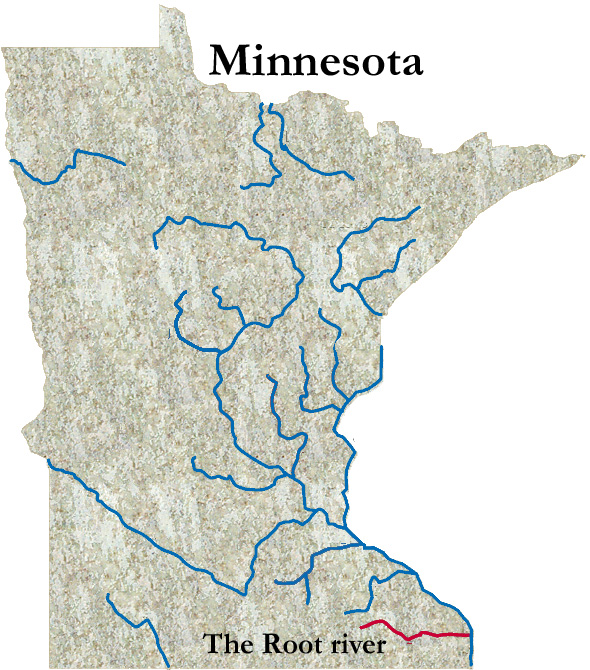
- The Root River in Minnesota
- Native name: Hokah (Dakota)

Location
- Country: United States
- States: Minnesota
- Counties: Fillmore, Houston, Mower, Olmsted, Winona
- Cities: Chatfield, Forestville, Hokah, Houston, Lanesboro, Rushford, Peterson, Preston, Stewartville, Whalan

Physical characteristics
- Source
  - coordinates: 43.8066305°N 92.1704397°W
- Mouth: Mississippi River
  - coordinates: 43.7619120°N 91.2518017°W
- Length: 80 miles (130 km)
- Discharge
  - location: 43.7619°N 91.2518°W

Basin features
- River system: Mississippi River
- Tributaries
  - left: Kinney Creek, Lynch Creek, Mill Creek, Money Creek, North Branch Root River, Raaen Creek, Rush Creek, Torkelson Creek, Trout Run
  - right: Diamond Creek (Root River tributary), Ferndale Creek, Gribben Creek, Middle Branch Root River, Partridge Creek, South Branch Root River, Rice Creek, South Fork Root River
- Bridges: Moen's Bridge

The Root River flows for 80 miles (130 km) through the Driftless Area of southeastern Minnesota and is a tributary of the Upper Mississippi River. The Root River is formed by three branches, the North, South and Middle branches of the Root River and the South Fork Root River. It is an excellent river for canoeing and fishing. The gentle to moderate flowing river drops an average of 3.4 ft/mile from Chatfield, Minnesota, to its pour point in the Mississippi River into Navigation Pool 7 just south of La Crosse, Wisconsin and east of Hokah, Minnesota.

== History and description ==
Root River is an English translation of the Dakota-language name Hokah.

The Root River is formed by the merger of the North Branch Root River and Middle Branch Root River in Chatfield, Minnesota. A mile and a half north of Lanesboro, Minnesota it is joined by the South Branch Root River. The South Fork Root River later joins the Root River near Houston, Minnesota.

The South Branch Root River rises in Mower County as agricultural drainage ditches, which disappear underground, re-emerging as a much cooler stream at Mystery Cave near Preston, Minnesota.

The Root River and its tributaries lie within Minnesota's Driftless Area.

== Fish and wildlife ==
Many fish species such as brook trout, rainbow trout, brown trout, smallmouth bass, rock bass, channel catfish, crappies, shorthead redhorse, river redhorse, golden redhorse, silver redhorse, shovelnose sturgeon, greater redhorse, black redhorse, northern hogsuckers, and white suckers inhabit the river. The Root River system provides habitat to a number of bird species. Red-tailed hawks and bald eagles can be found in the area. Blue herons, wild turkeys, and wood ducks are also commonly seen. Numerous mammals can be spotted in the region including deer, gray fox, red fox, coyotes, raccoons, squirrels, and badgers.

== Trail ==
The Root River State Trail is a 42-mile-long (68 km) trail for bicycling, hiking, skating, skiing, etc. It begins in Fountain and continues through Lanesboro, Whalan, Peterson, Rushford, and Houston.

== 2007 flood ==
As a result of the 2007 Midwest flooding, the river rose to 19 feet (5.8 m), about a foot short of the height of the dike protecting the town of Houston.

== Geology ==
Root river primarily flows through the prairie du chien formation and through the cedar valley group. Ca 450 Million years ago the area was a shallow Ordovician Sea, It had many fossils types primarily Cephalopods, Gastropods, Fisherites (Algae that resembled sunflower shapes and was a plant that was roughly 6 inch's in diameter on average yet varys slightly.) More specifically it flows through the Dubuque Formation, Stewartville Formation. The Root river has many many karst features such as caves, sinkholes, springs and more. Some branches of the river seemingly disappear, This is because the riverbed has microscopic cracks within the limestone that the water disappears into and then the numerous caves take that water and move it to a place where eventually it is released through a spring.

== Description ==
The south branch root river is a subsection of the Root River, it starts west of Whalan, Minnesota but slightly east and more north of lanesboro. The south branch root river briefly disappears underground and resurfaces further east. This is by far one of the most popular tributaries of the Root River, It receives thousands of visitors and tourists a year most attending Niagara cave, Mystery cave, Forestville, Or in general the state parks and recreational areas around the area.

== Fossils ==
The fossils in south branch root river include Cephalopods, Gastropods, Receptaculites. The most common of these are Endoceras and Orthoceras occasionally small snail shells can be spotted in the rocks however, horizontal Receptaculites are very common deeper into the rock layers.

== Geology ==
The geology of south branch root river is primarily limestones with a lot of cracks within. Some of the layers are listed as following order.

- Dubuque Formation
- Stewartville Formation (The stewartville formation is in the galena group)

Within these formations are caves, springs, and sinkholes. These are formed when rainwater and river water mixes with carbon to form carbonic acid. this acid is formed when carbon dioxide in the atmosphere or underground binds to the water molecules and creates the weak acid. Carbonic acid can follow through small limestone cracks and through a combination of erosion and dissolution form huge horizontal passages and vertical drops, If the natural limestone ceiling gets too thin it will collapse forming a sinkhole.

== Gallery ==
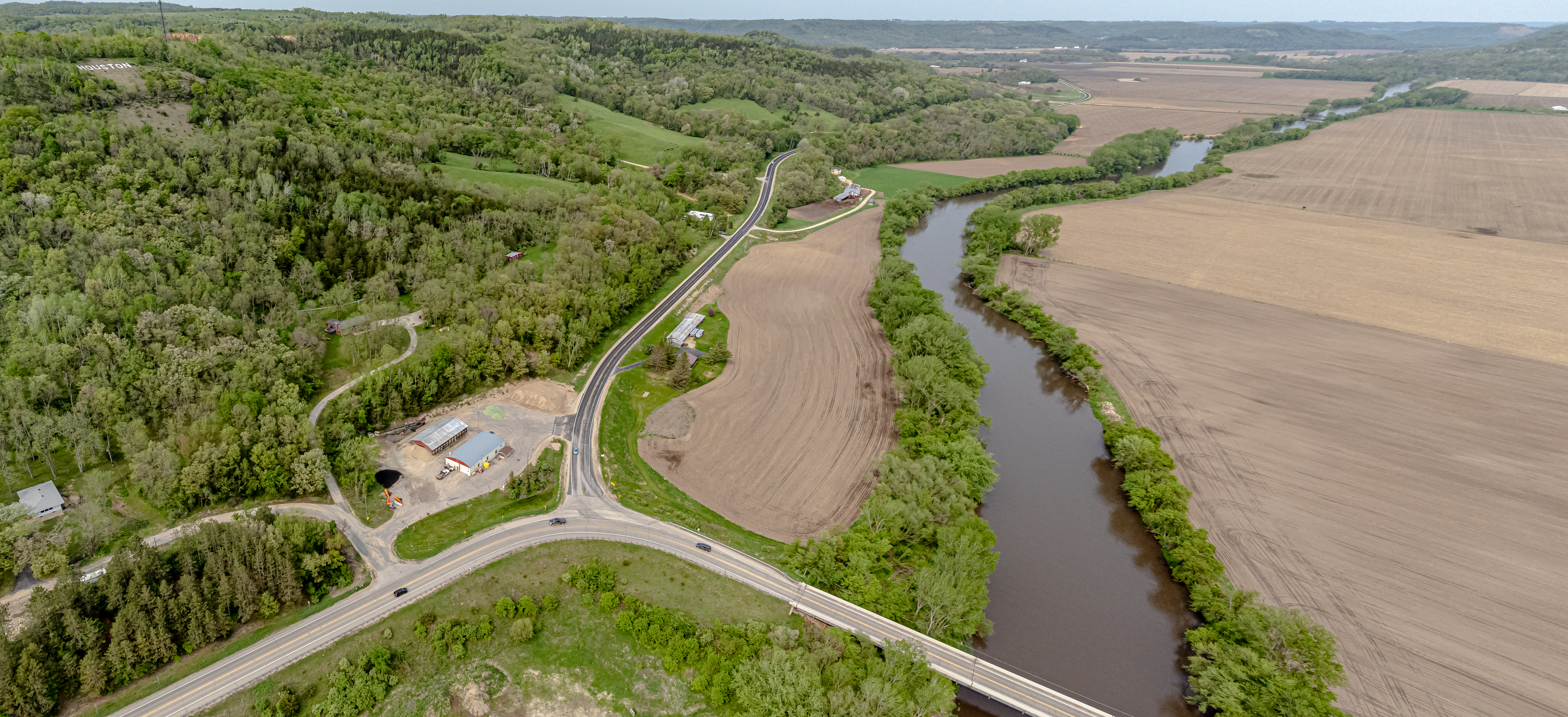
Root River by Houston, Minnesota

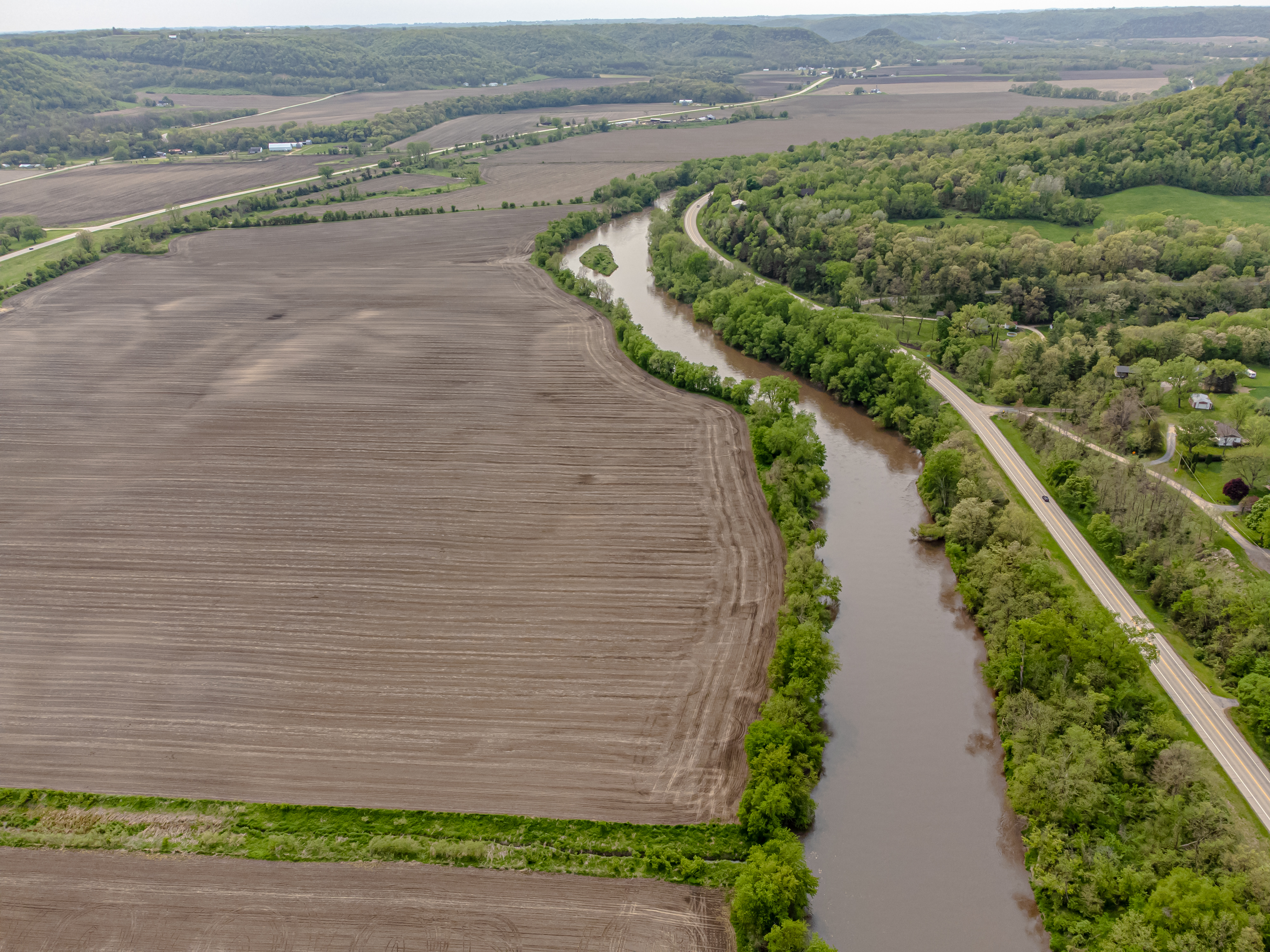
Looking West

== Maps ==
Major Rivers in Southeast Minnesota
The sources of major rivers in Southeast Minnesota are indicated

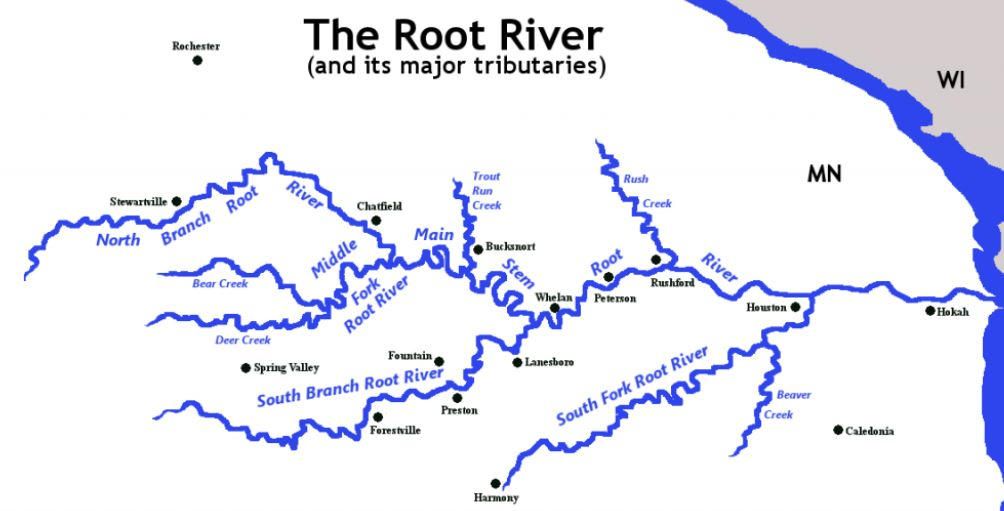
The Southeast Minnesota Root River and its major tributaries

== See also ==
- List of Minnesota rivers
- List of longest streams of Minnesota
