= Lanesboro, Minnesota =

City in Minnesota, United States

Lanesboro
- City
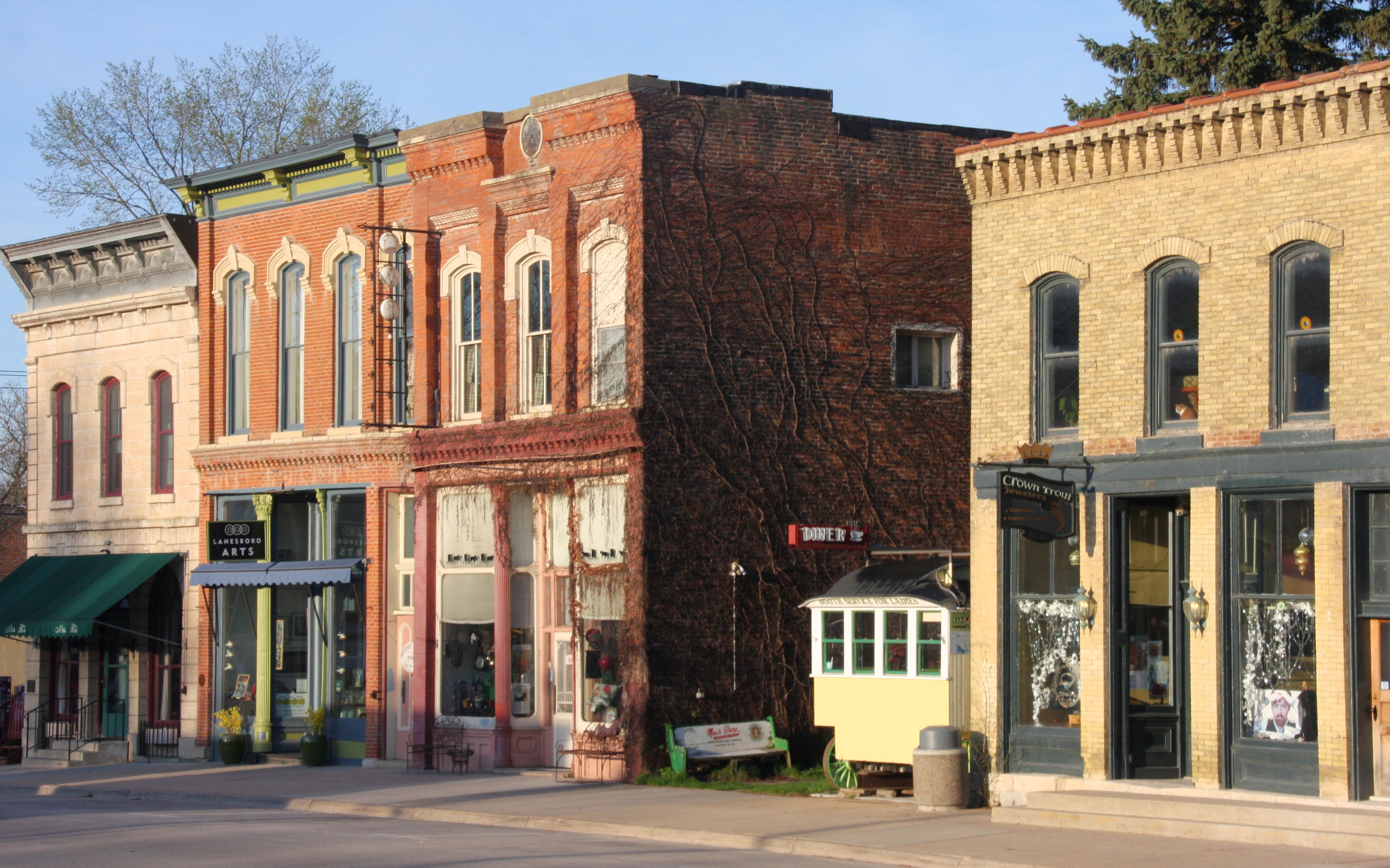
- Much of downtown Lanesboro is listed on the National Register of Historic Places

- Location of Lanesboro, Minnesota
- Coordinates: 43°42′54″N 91°58′13″W
- Country: United States
- State: Minnesota
- County: Fillmore

Area
  - Total: 1.29 sq mi (3.33 km^{2})
  - Land: 1.29 sq mi (3.33 km^{2})
  - Water: 0 sq mi (0.00 km^{2})
- Elevation: 968 ft (295 m)

Population (2020)
  - Total: 724
  - Density: 563.2/sq mi (217.46/km^{2})
- Time zone: UTC-6 (Central (CST))
  - Summer (DST): UTC-5 (CDT)
- ZIP code: 55949
- Area code: 507
- FIPS code: 27-35450
- GNIS feature ID: 2395628
- Website: City of Lanesboro

Lanesboro is a city in Fillmore County, Minnesota, United States. As of the 2020 census, Lanesboro had a population of 724. It was named after F. A. Lane, an early landowner.

The South Branch of the Root River flows through it, with a waterfall dam across from Sylvan Park. The Root River State Trail and other bike paths also serve the town. An Amish community is in the area and the town is home to many unique shops and restaurants, and a professional stage theater.

== History ==
Lanesboro was platted in 1868. A post office was established as Lanesboro in 1868, and the name was changed to Lanesboro in 1883. The city was named for one of its founders, F. A. Lane.

== Geography ==
According to the United States Census Bureau, the city has a total area of 1.32 square miles (3.42 km^{2}), all land.

Minnesota State Highways 16 and 250 and County Roads 8 and 21 are four of the main routes in Lanesboro.

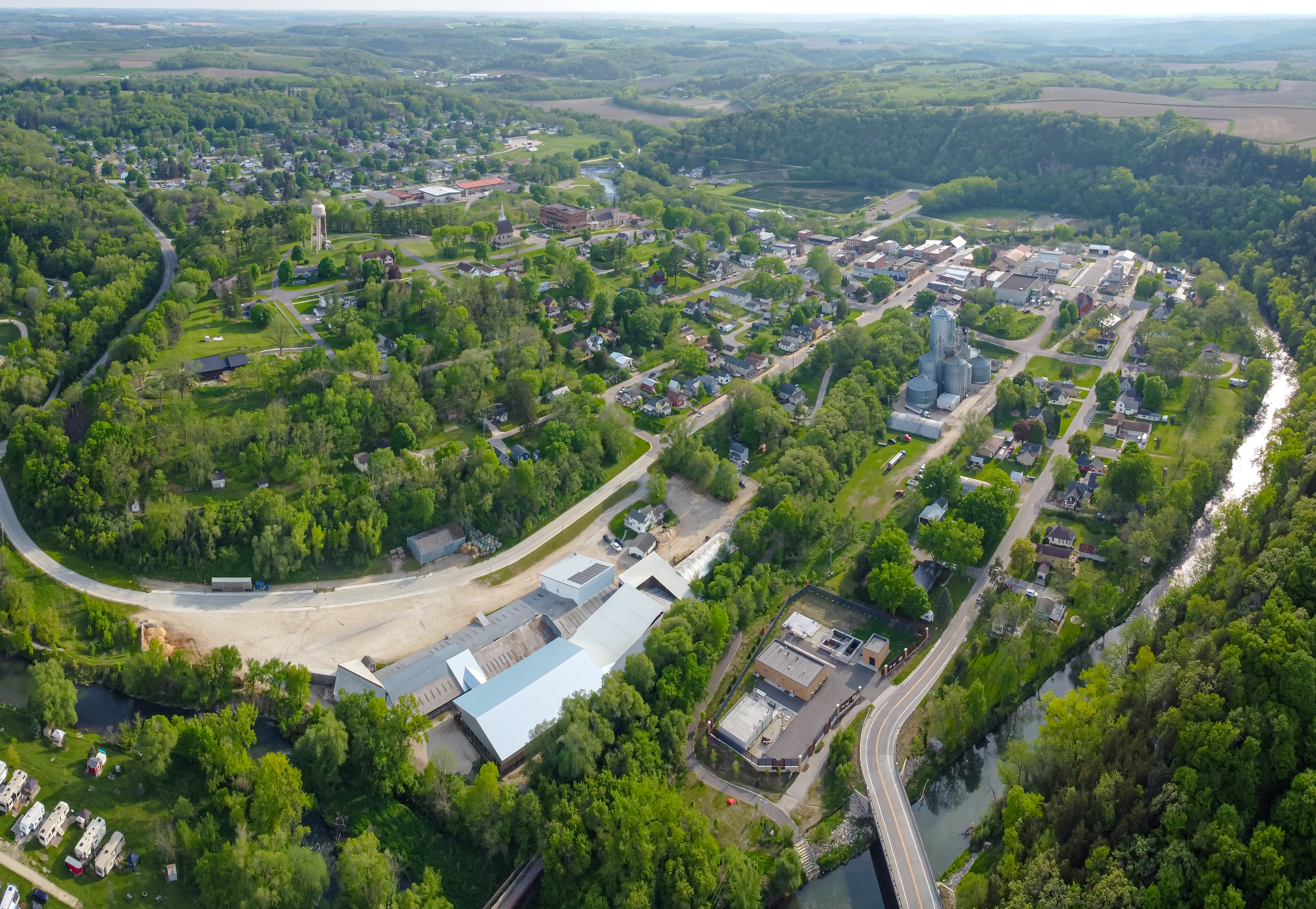

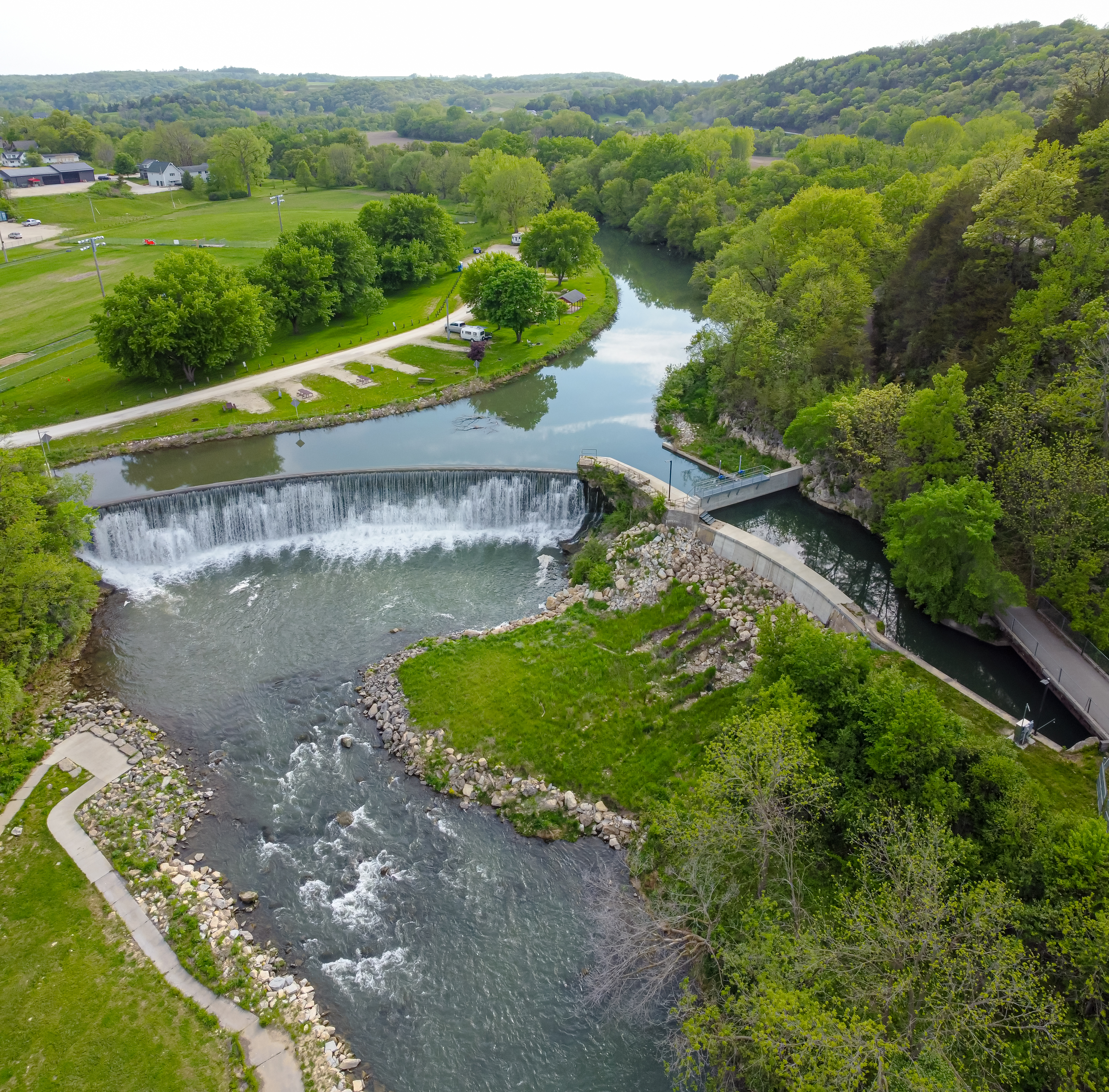
Dam and waterfall

== Trail connection ==
Lanesboro is one of several towns intersected by the Root River State Trail.

== Recognition ==
Lanesboro received the Great American Main Street Award in 1998. Author John Villani named the community one of the 100 Best Small Art Towns in America. It has also been rated one of the "50 Best Outdoor Sports Towns" by Sports Afield magazine.

Most recently, Outside Magazine featured the community as one of the "20 Best Dream Towns in America".

== Art and culture ==
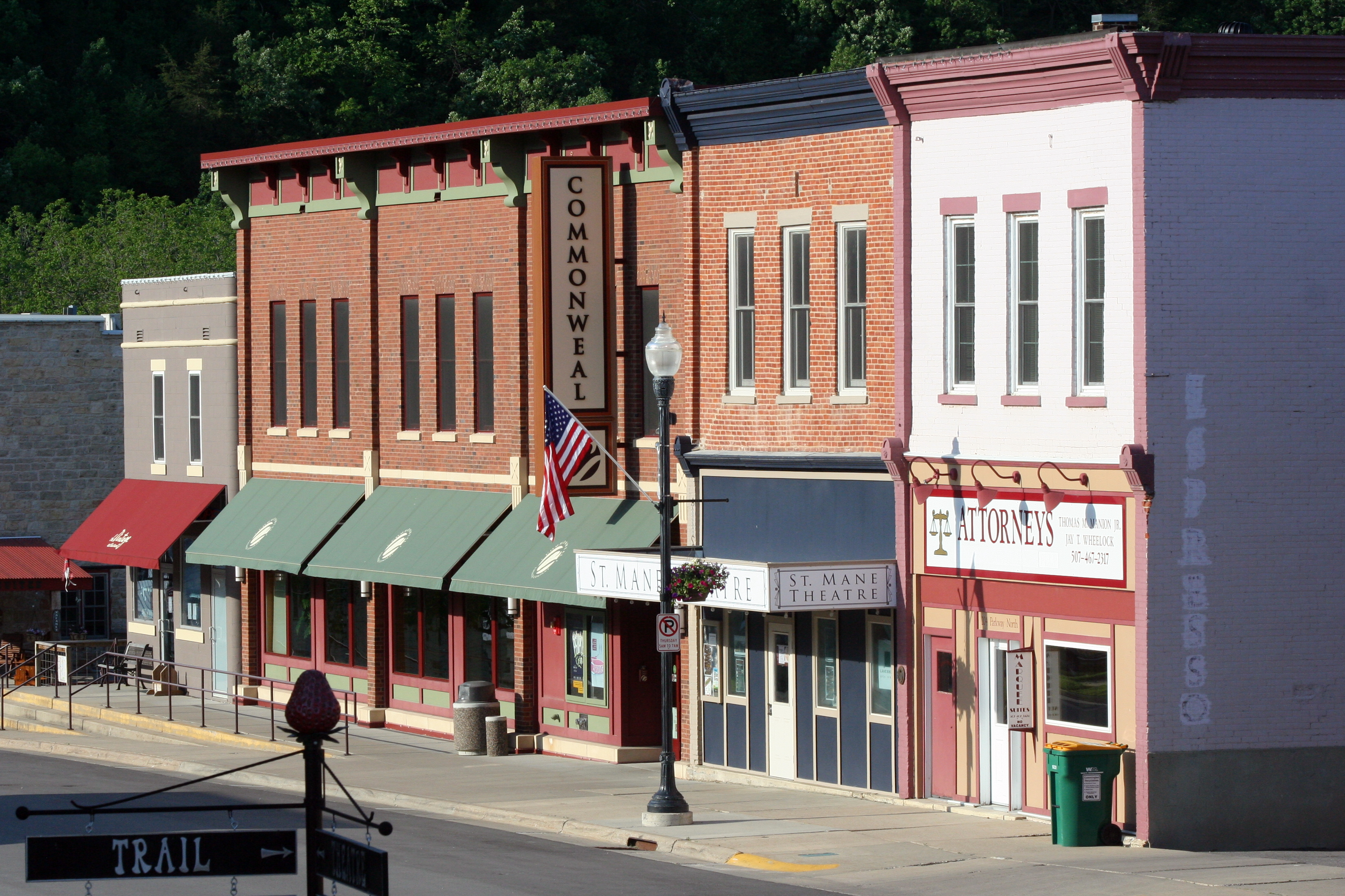
Commonweal Theatre

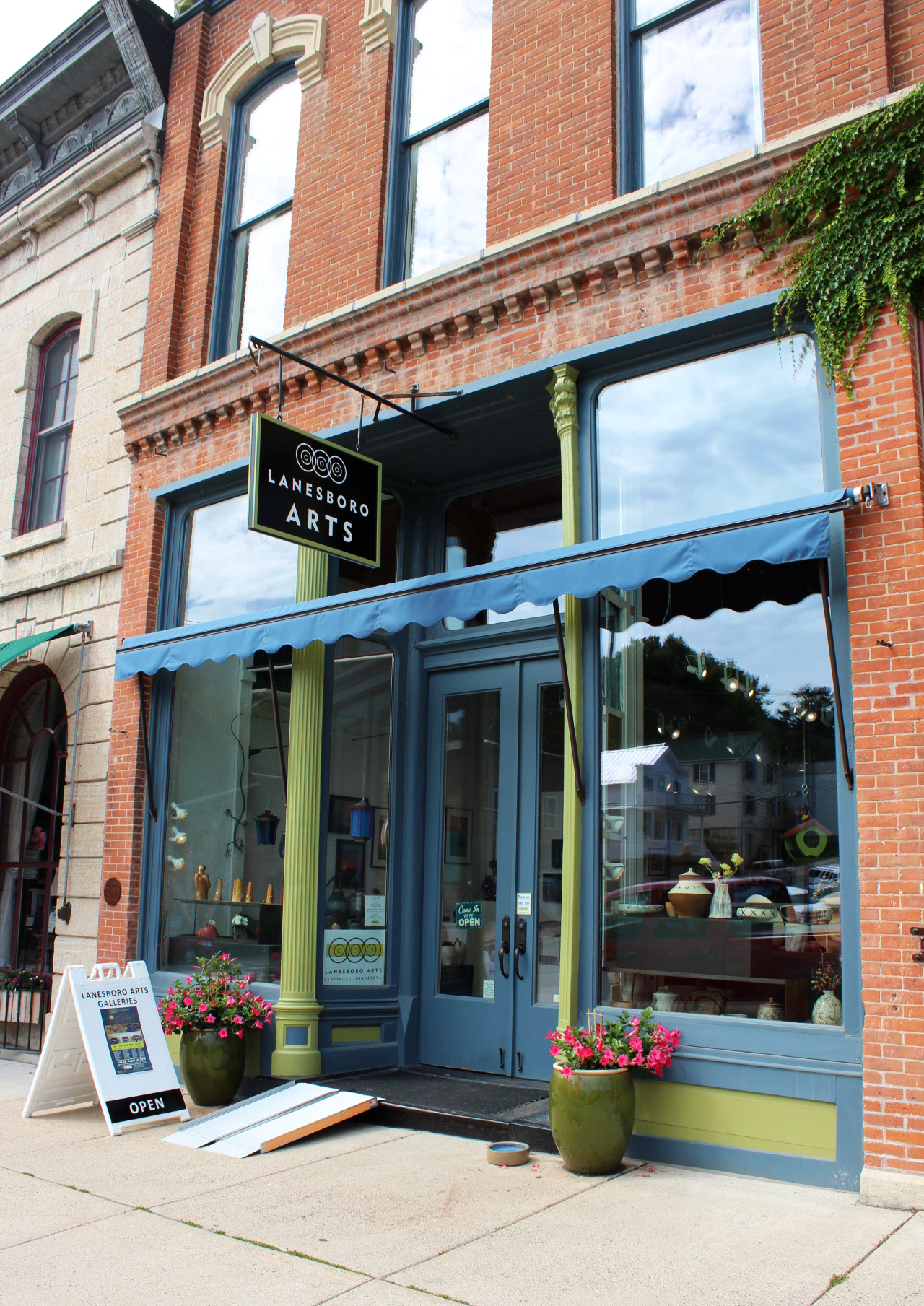
Lanesboro Arts

Since 1989, Lanesboro has been home to the Commonweal Theatre Company, a professional ensemble dedicated to celebrating the human condition through actor-based storytelling. Each year, the Commonweal offers 4-6 plays ranging from Ibsen to family-friendly entertainment to holiday classics. During the summer months, two plays run in repertory, giving visitors the opportunity to see two different shows during their stay. The Commonweal, in cooperation with area businesses and organizations, hosts an annual Ibsen Festival celebrating Norwegian art and culture through workshops, lectures, food, and featuring Commonweal's production of an Ibsen play. A live one-hour radio show, "Over the Back Fence," is broadcast each Sunday evening from the theater during the summer months with tickets sold at the door. On July 7, 2007, the Commonweal opened a new theater facility called The Commonweal. This $3.5 million home seats 191 patrons in a thrust auditorium with an exterior designed to complement historic Lanesboro. The interior design was coordinated by area artist Karl Unnasch with regional elements such as reclaimed barn stone and lumber, cement floors and a permanent installation of area objects.

The Lanesboro Arts Council and Cornucopia Art Center merged to create Lanesboro Arts in 2010. Their gallery building, in downtown Lanesboro, features a spacious juried sales gallery and a traveling exhibition gallery, both of which showcase the work of more than 100 individual regional artists to more than 20,000 visitors annually, some as far as Saudi Arabia, Korea, China, Israel and Kenya. The St. Mane Theater is owned and operated by Lanesboro Arts, and is right next door to the Commonweal, giving Lanesboro a bonafide Theater District. It's the home to several community theater productions throughout the year, as well as the Over the Back Fence community variety show (monthly from March through November), and other performing arts events and independent film screenings.

In 2013 Artplace America named Lanesboro one of the top twelve “small town artplaces” in the nation. The designation is based on the concentration of arts organizations, arts-oriented businesses and creative occupations.

== Library ==
Lanesboro Public Library is a member of Southeastern Libraries Cooperating, the southeast Minnesota library region.

== Events ==
Every Saturday before Father's Day in June, an art festival organized by Lanesboro Arts, dubbed "Art in the Park," fills the town's Sylvan Park. During the first August, the popular "Buffalo Bill Days" is held, celebrating one of Lanesboro's famous frequent visitors, Buffalo Bill. As the town's tourist popularity grows, more festivals and get-togethers are being added to the town's busy schedule of events.

In 2008, the governor of Minnesota declared Lanesboro the Rhubarb Capital of Minnesota. The first weekend in June Lanesboro hosts a Rhubarb Festival. In 2007, Garrison Keillor broadcast A Prairie Home Companion from the Lanesboro softball field and featured stories and songs about rhubarb.

Every Saturday, the Lanesboro Farmers' Market can be found in Sylvan Park, starting on the first Saturday of May and ending on the last Saturday of October.

== Demographics ==
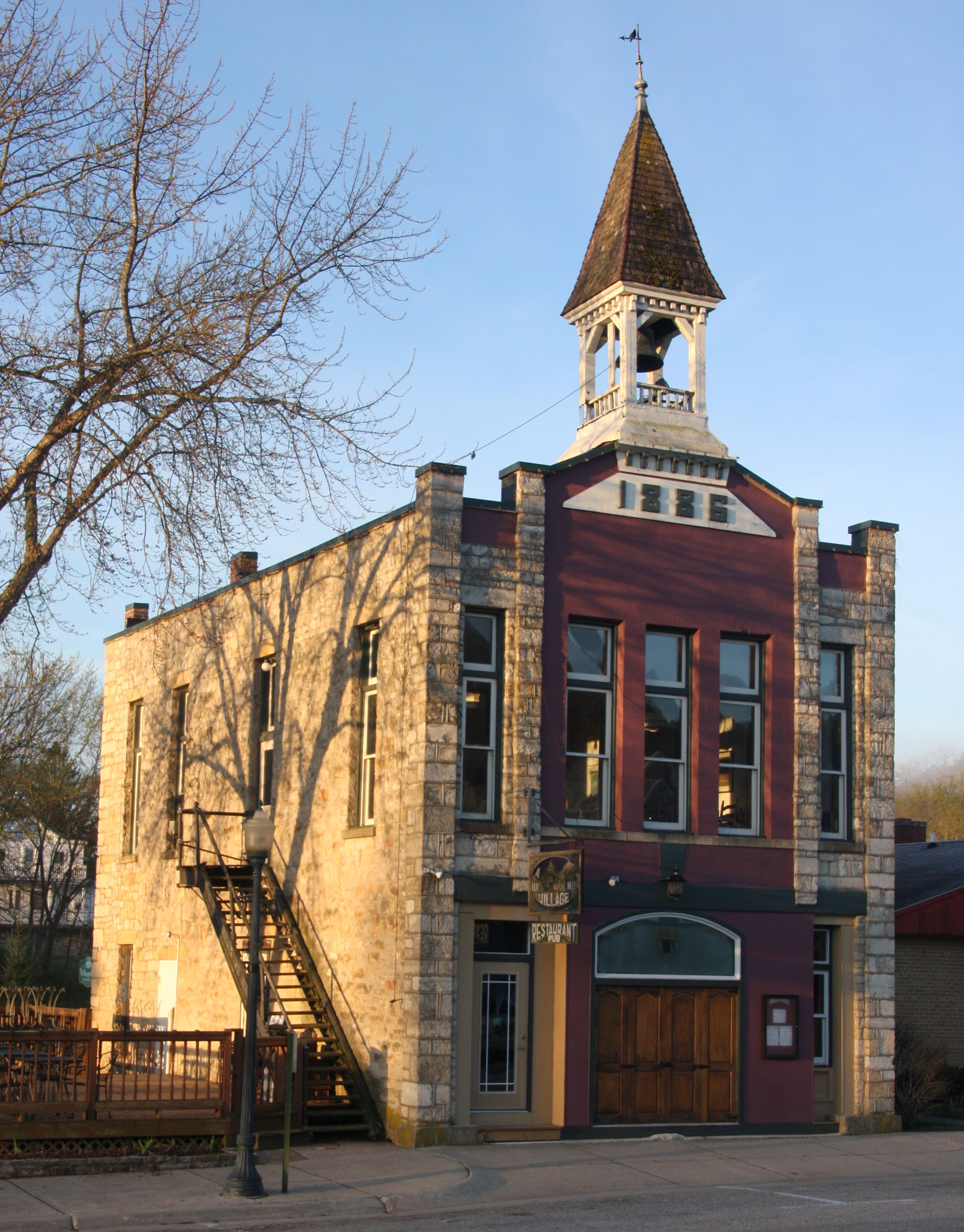
The Old Village Hall, listed on the National Register of Historic Places as part of the Lanesboro Historic District.

Historical population
Census	Pop.	Note	%±
1870	655		—
1880	1,032		57.6%
1890	898		−13.0%
1900	1,102		22.7%
1910	987		−10.4%
1920	1,015		2.8%
1930	1,014		−0.1%
1940	1,100		8.5%
1950	1,100		0.0%
1960	1,063		−3.4%
1970	850		−20.0%
1980	923		8.6%
1990	858		−7.0%
2000	788		−8.2%
2010	754		−4.3%
2020	724		−4.0%
U.S. Decennial Census

=== 2010 census ===
As of the census of 2010, there were 754 people, 373 households, and 207 families residing in the city. The population density was 571.2 inhabitants per square mile (220.5/km^{2}). There were 464 housing units at an average density of 351.5 per square mile (135.7/km^{2}). The racial makeup of the city was 97.7% White, 0.3% African American, 0.1% Native American, 0.3% from other races, and 1.6% from two or more races. Hispanic or Latino of any race were 0.9% of the population.

There were 373 households, of which 20.4% had children under the age of 18 living with them, 45.6% were married couples living together, 6.7% had a female householder with no husband present, 3.2% had a male householder with no wife present, and 44.5% were non-families. 38.9% of all households were made up of individuals, and 19.3% had someone living alone who was 65 years of age or older. The average household size was 2.02 and the average family size was 2.67.

The median age in the city was 49.8 years. 18.2% of residents were under the age of 18; 4.9% were between the ages of 18 and 24; 19.1% were from 25 to 44; 34.8% were from 45 to 64; and 22.8% were 65 years of age or older. The gender makeup of the city was 48.4% male and 51.6% female.

== Notable people ==
- Duane Benson, former member of Minnesota House of Representatives, and former majority leader and minority leader of Minnesota Senate.
- Katherine M. Cook, educator and government official who specialized in rural education
- Arthur B. Langlie, 12th and 14th Governor of the state of Washington.
- Luke Miller, businessman, physician, and former Minnesota state senator
- Edwin Vincent O'Hara, Roman Catholic Church prelate.
