= Camp Creek (Root River tributary) =

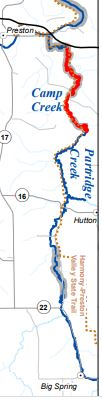
- Camp Creek

- Mouth of Camp Creek

Location
- Country: United States
- State: Minnesota
- County: Fillmore County

Physical characteristics
- Source
  - coordinates: 43.5513545°N 92.0504389°W
- Mouth
  - location: Preston
  - coordinates: 43.6702423°N 92.0640484°W

Basin features
- River system: South Branch Root River
- Tributaries
  - right: Patridge Creek

Camp Creek is a stream in Fillmore County, in the U.S. state of Minnesota. It is a tributary of the South Branch Root River. Camp Creek was named from the fact pioneer settlers camped upon its banks.

== Habitat ==
While Camp Creek is located in the Driftless Area, it is flows through fields and does not have significant cliffs along its route. According to the Minnesota Department of Natural Resources, the species present in Camp Creek include: Brown trout, rainbow trout, white sucker, creek chub, slimy sculpin, brook stickleback, longnose dace, blacknose dace, Johnny darter, central stoneroller, bluntnose minnow, and fantail darter. The Root River Trail system follows Camp Creek for much of its extent. A small stream, Partridge Creek enters Camp Creek near State Route 16. Patridge Creek was formerly called Duxbury Creek for the pioneers that settled there.

== See also ==
- List of rivers of Minnesota
