= New Hartford, Minnesota =

Unincorporated community in Minnesota, United States

New Hartford
- Unincorporated community
- Location within Minnesota Location within the United States
- Coordinates: 43°52′43″N 91°28′33″W
- Country: United States
- State: Minnesota
- County: Winona
- Elevation: 863 ft (263 m)
- Time zone: UTC-6 (Central (CST))
  - Summer (DST): UTC-5 (CDT)
- Area code: 507
- GNIS feature ID: 654844

New Hartford is an unincorporated community in New Hartford Township, Winona County, Minnesota, United States. The Pine Creek (Mississippi River tributary) flows through New Hartford.

== Gallery ==
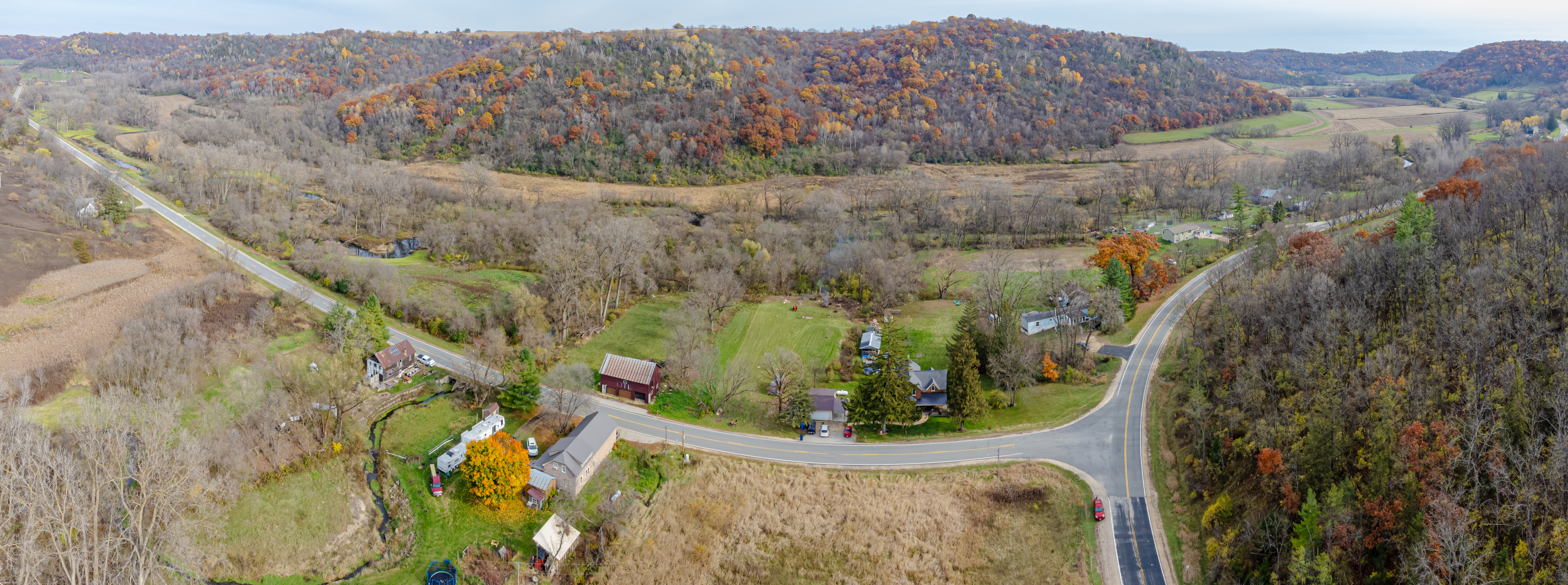
New Hartford, Minnesota
