= Commonweal Theatre Company =

Coordinates: 43°43′21.7″N 91°58′36″W

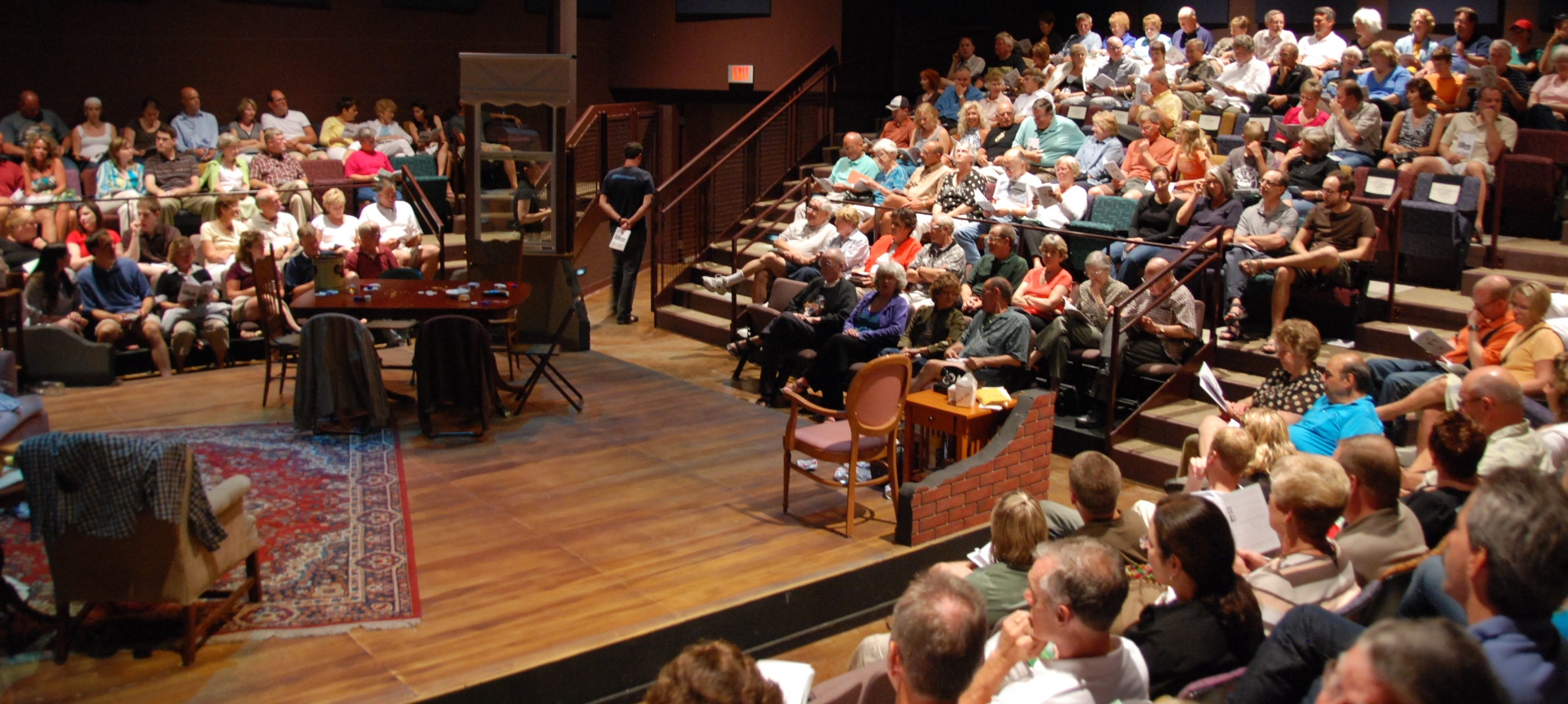

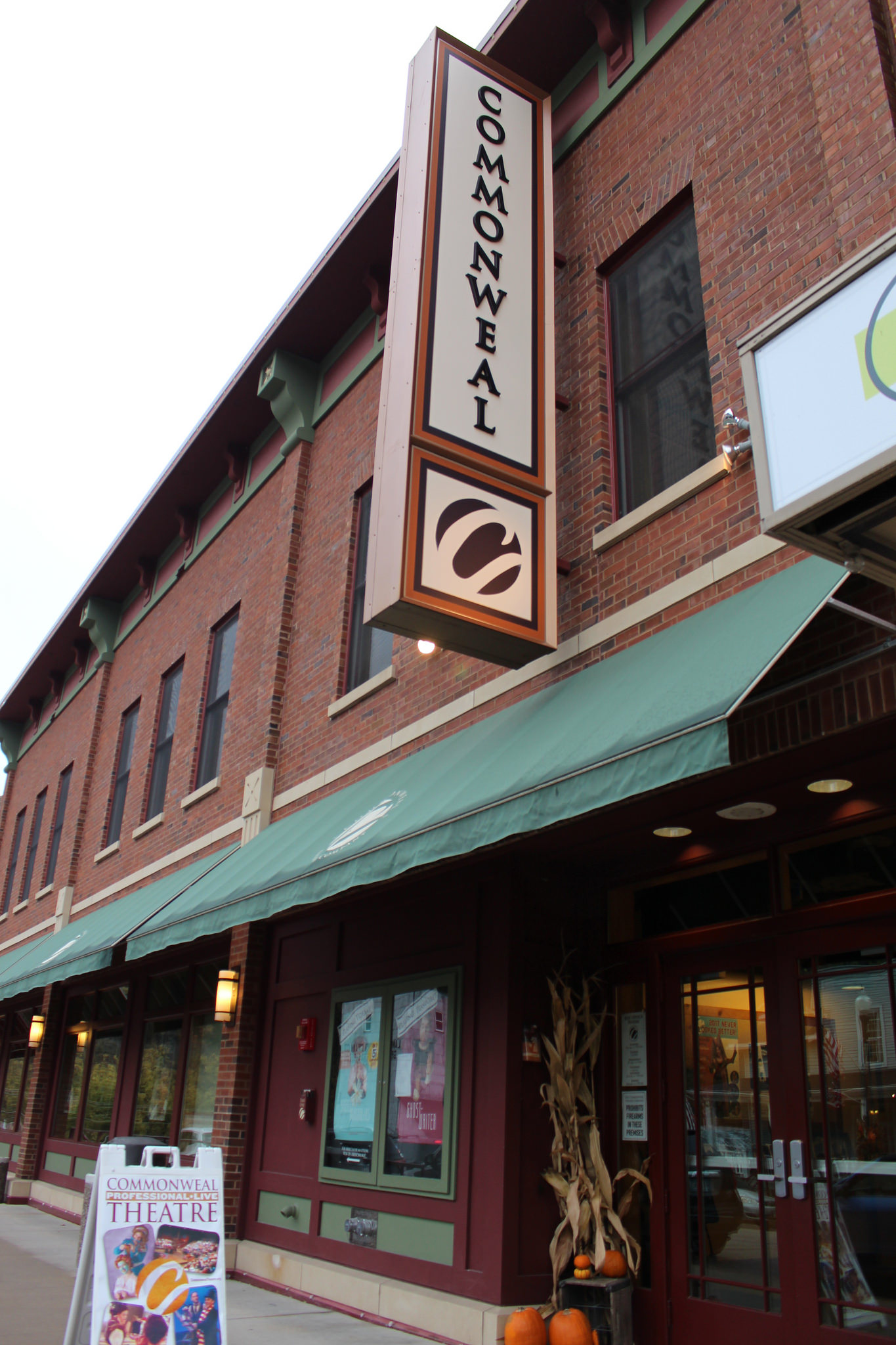
An external view of the Commonweal Theatre

The Commonweal Theatre Company is a professional, live theatre company in Lanesboro, Minnesota, United States. Established in 1989 by Eric Bunge, Scott Olson and Scott Putman, the company's season runs April to December and comprises five plays chosen from among classic, contemporary, and emerging playwrights.

== Company structure ==
The Commonweal is an artist-run company, organized as a 501(c)(3) nonprofit arts organization. It has a "Resident Ensemble" of members living in the Lanesboro, MN, area. This group provides the day-to-day artistic and operational needs of the company as artist-administrators. The company also employs seasonal company members, college interns, and, since 2008, an Apprentice Company.

== History ==
The Commonweal Theatre was founded in 1989 by Eric Lorentz Bunge, Scott Olson, and Scott Putman at the request of the Lanesboro Arts Council. The first season of the company was eleven weeks long and employed ten artists who presented Crimes of the Heart and A Midsummer Night's Dream.

In 1991, the company launched its student matinee program, and in 1992 began its high school conservatory program, a two-week, intensive immersion in theatre training for area high school students. In 1993, the company moved to a rotating repertory season schedule. By 1994 the production season extended to December.

In 2008, the company added the first ever Apprentice Company, bringing five young professional theatre artists to the Lanesboro area to act, direct, and become more familiar with the company's structure.

Currently, Hal Cropp serves as the company's Executive Director and Adrienne Sweeney serves as Assistant Artistic Director.

== New Theatre ==
The 200-seat Commonweal Theatre opened in July 2007, located on Lanesboro's main street. The exterior façade, created by Minnesota artist Karl Unnasch, recreates three Lanesboro shop fronts. The interior design focuses on the natural beauty and history of the region with barn doors acting as bathroom stalls, stone walls mirroring the surrounding bluffs, concrete floors reflecting the building's prior life as a cheese factory, and seats reclaimed from the original Guthrie Theater.

== 2020 mainstage season ==
I Ought to be in Pictures by Neil Simon

Born Yesterday by Garson Kanin

One Man, Two Guvnors by Richard Bean

Doubt by John Patrick Shanley

A Christmas Carol by Commonweal Theatre Company; based on the novella by Charles Dickens
