= Rushford Public Library =

Library in Rushford, Minnesota, US

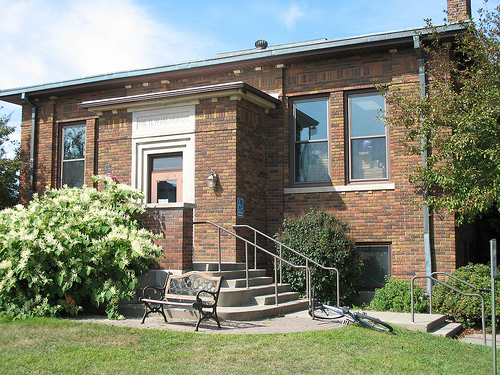
- Rushford Public Library
- 43.8105°N 91.75367°W
- Location: 101 North Mill St. Rushford MN 55971

Collection
- Size: 24,995

Access and use
- Circulation: 32,787
- Population served: 3900

Other information
- Director: Susan Hart
- Website: http://rushford.lib.mn.us/

The Rushford Public Library is a library in Rushford, Minnesota. It is a member of Southeastern Libraries Cooperating, the SE Minnesota library region.

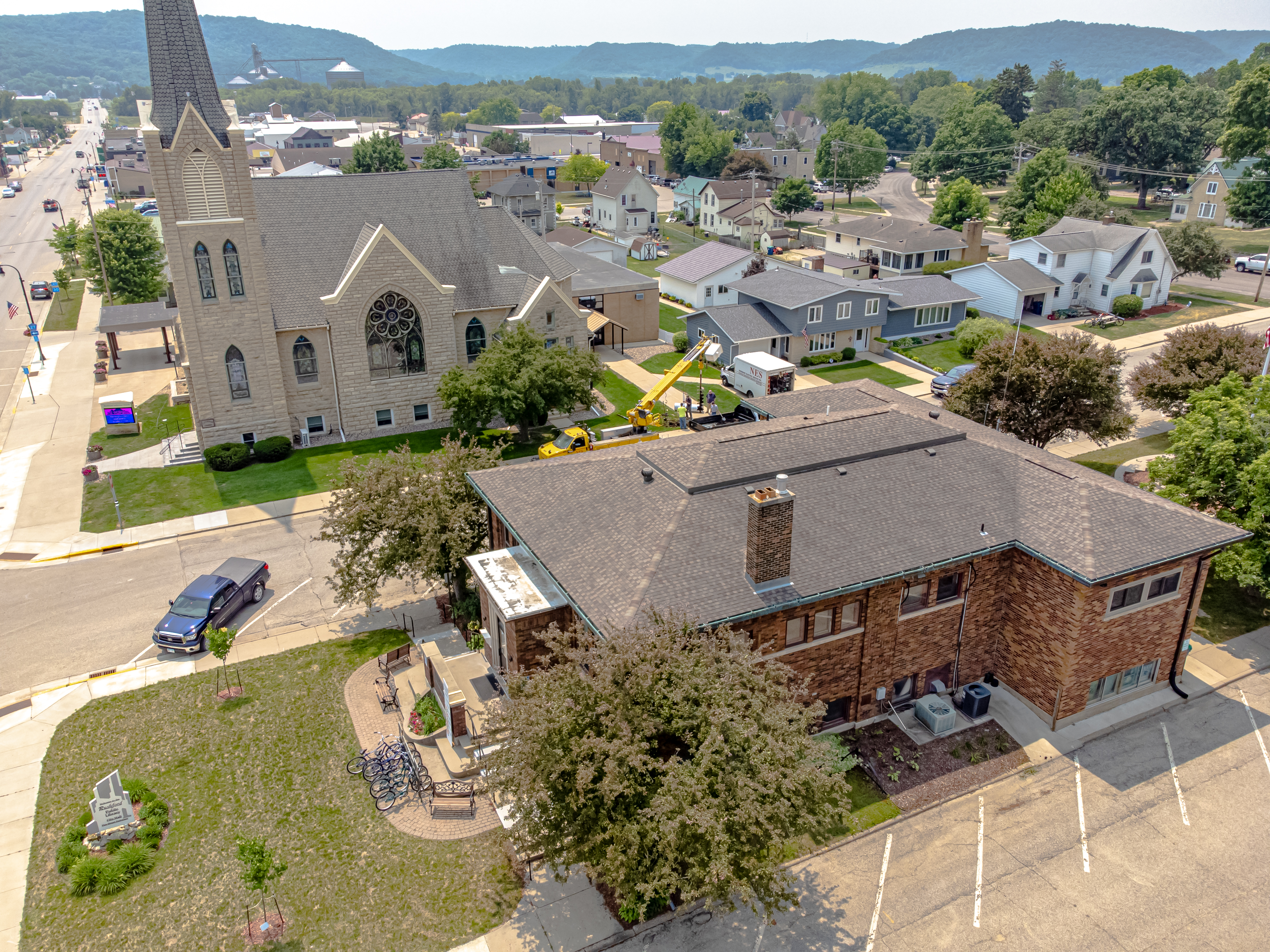
Rushford city hall and library
