= Rush Creek (Root River tributary) =

Location
- Countries: United States
- States: Minnesota
- Counties: Winona, Fillmore
- Cities: Rushford

Physical characteristics
- Source
  - location: Utica Township, Winona County, Minnesota
  - coordinates: 43.944427925898594°N 91.9049168509712°W
- Mouth: Root River
  - location: Rushford, Minnesota
  - coordinates: 43°48′18″N 91°44′51″W

Basin features
- River system: Root River
- Tributaries
  - left: Ahrensfeld Creek (Rush Creek tributary), Borson Spring (Rush Creek tributary)
  - right: Ferguson Creek (Rush Creek tributary), Pine Creek (Rush Creek tributary)

Rush Creek is a stream in Fillmore and Winona counties, in the U.S. state of Minnesota. It is a tributary of the Root River, which it joins in Rushford, Minnesota.

== History ==
The creek was named for the rush plants lining its banks.

Rush Creek suffered severe flooding in the Southeast Minnesota floods of August 18–20, 2007.

According to the Minnesota Department of Natural Resources, fish species present in Rush Creek include: brown trout, brook trout, rainbow trout, white sucker, American brook lamprey, creek chub, northern hog sucker, golden redhorse, shorthead redhorse, brook stickleback, green sunfish, sculpin, longnose dace, blacknose dace, quillback and Johnny darter. The Win-Cres Chapter of Trout Unlimited began a stream restoration project on Rush Creek in 2018. There was damage to the restoration project in Spring 2019 flooding. Rush Creek can be seen from the Enterprise Rest Area on Interstate 90.

== See also ==
- List of rivers of Minnesota
- Rushford, Minnesota
