= Rushford Municipal Airport =

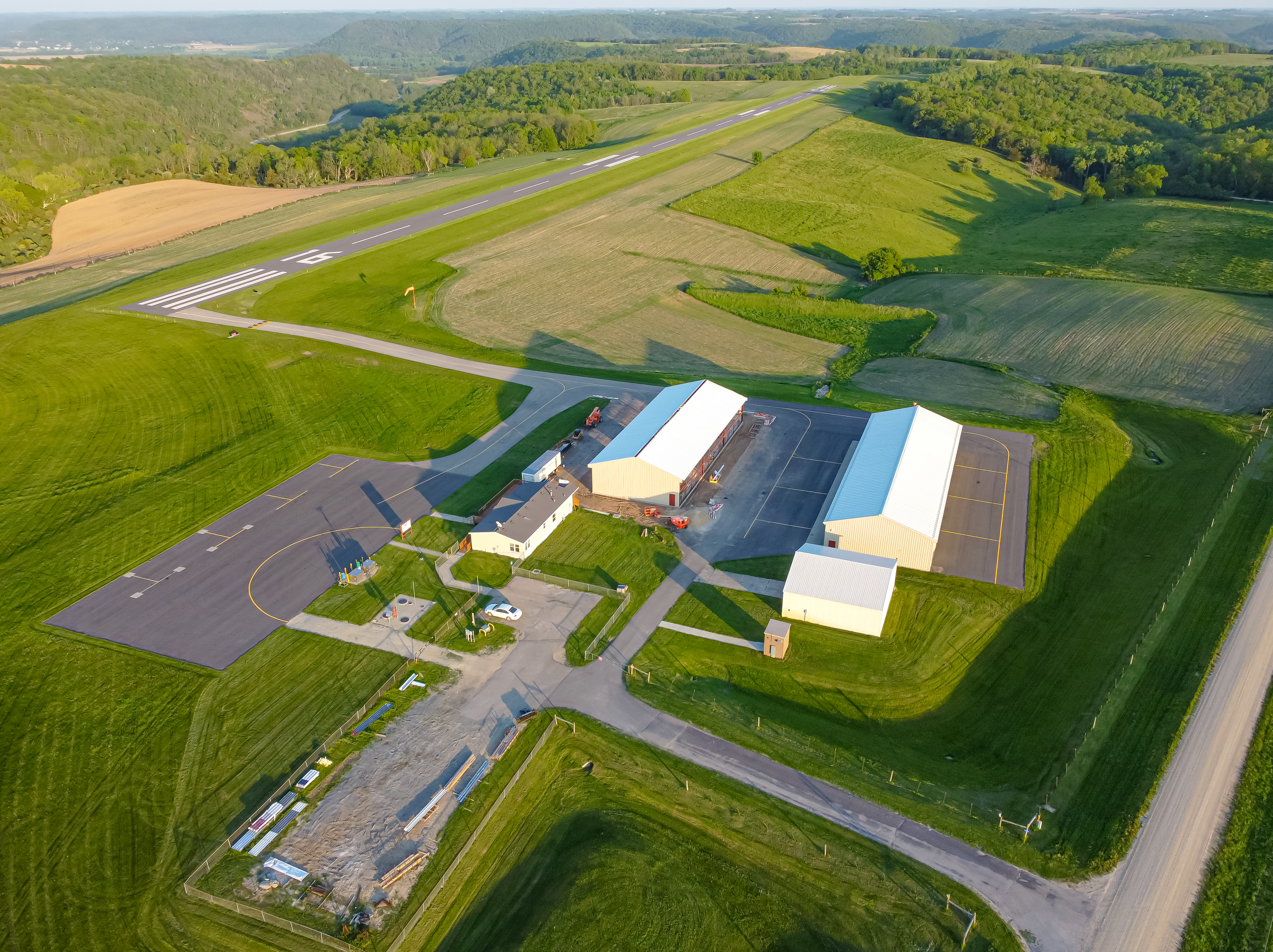
- IATA: none; ICAO: none; FAA LID: 55Y

Summary
- Airport type: Public
- Owner: City of Rushford
- Serves: Rushford, Minnesota
- Elevation AMSL: 1,211 ft / 369.1 m
- Coordinates: 43°48′56.9700″N 091°49′48.3420″W

Map
- Location of airport in Minnesota/United States 55Y (the United States)

Runways
| Direction | Length | | Surface |
| Direction | ft | m | Surface |
|---|---|---|---|
| 16/34 | 3,200 x 60 | 975 x 18 | Asphalt |

Rushford Municipal Airport (FAA LID: 55Y) also known as Robert W. Bunke Field is a city-owned public-use airport located three miles west of the city of Rushford, Minnesota in Fillmore County.

== Facilities and aircraft ==
Rushford Airport contains one runway designated 16/34 with a 3,200 x 60 ft (975 x 18 m) asphalt surface. For the 12 months ending April 30, 2019, the airport had 2,000 aircraft operations, an average of 5.48 per day: 60% being local-general aviation and 40% transient general aviation. The airport housed 2 single-engine airplanes.

== See also ==
- List of airports in Minnesota
