= Pine Creek (Mississippi River tributary) =

- Mouth of Pine Creek

Location
- Country: United States
- State: Minnesota
- County: Houston County, Winona County

Physical characteristics
- Source
  - location: Witoka
  - coordinates: 43.8932979°N 91.543477°W
- Mouth
  - coordinates: 43°48′20″N 91°17′58″W

Basin features
- River system: Upper Mississippi River

Pine Creek is a 23.7-mile-long (38.1 km) tributary of the Mississippi River in Winona and Houston counties, Minnesota, United States. It joins the Mississippi southeast of La Crescent, Minnesota, directly across from La Crosse, Wisconsin.

== History ==
Pine Creek was named for the white pine trees near its banks. There is also a South Fork of Pine Creek, which flows into Pine Creek. Pine Creek flows through the city of New Hartford, Minnesota. This Pine Creek is in the eastern end of Winona County and should not be confused with Pine Creek, a tributary of Rush Creek, in the western region of the county.

== Gallery ==
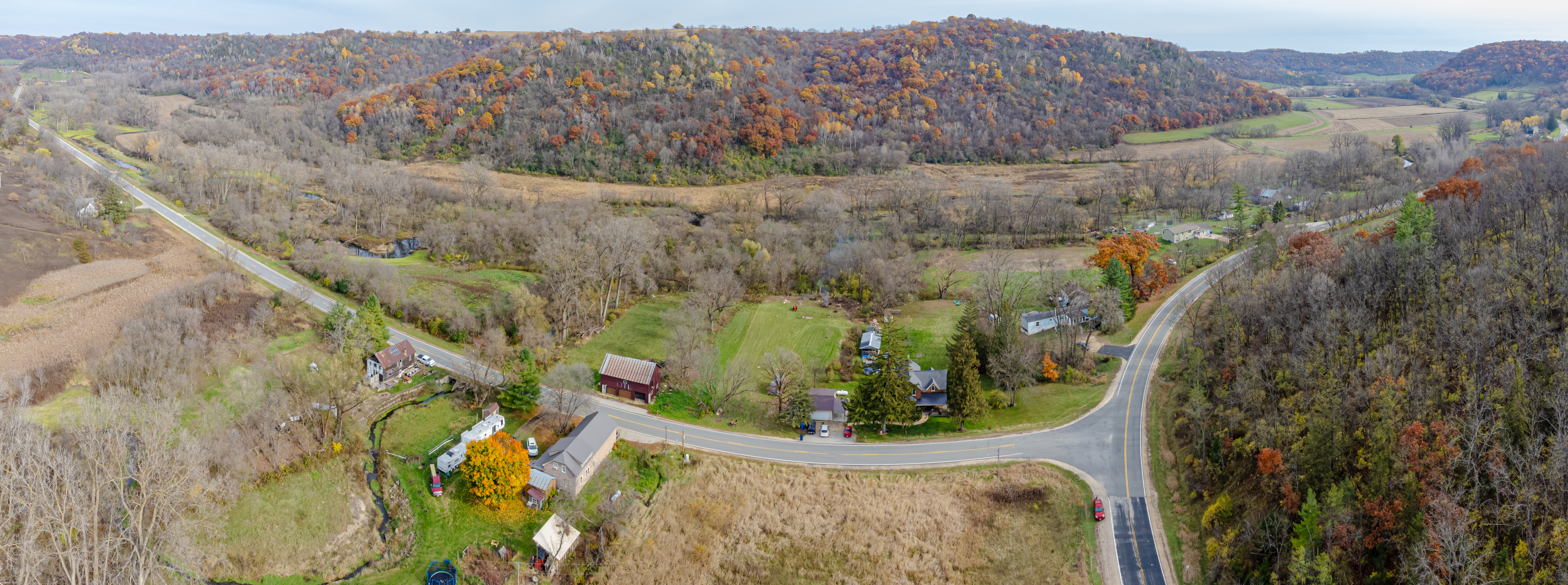
Pine Creek going through New Hartford, Minnesota

== See also ==
- List of rivers of Minnesota
