= Whalan, Minnesota =

City in Minnesota, United States

Whalan
- City
- Location of Whalan, Minnesota
- Coordinates: 43°44′03″N 91°55′26″W
- Country: United States
- State: Minnesota
- County: Fillmore

Area
  - Total: 0.46 sq mi (1.18 km^{2})
  - Land: 0.43 sq mi (1.11 km^{2})
  - Water: 0.027 sq mi (0.07 km^{2})
- Elevation: 810 ft (250 m)

Population (2020)
  - Total: 67
  - Density: 156/sq mi (60.1/km^{2})
- Time zone: UTC-6 (Central (CST))
  - Summer (DST): UTC-5 (CDT)
- ZIP code: 55949
- Area code: 507
- FIPS code: 27-69808
- GNIS feature ID: 2397290
- Website: https://cityofwhalan.weebly.com/

Whalan is a city in Fillmore County, Minnesota, United States. As of the 2020 census, Whalan had a population of 67.

== History ==
Whalan was laid out in 1868. It was named after John Whaalahan, the original owner of the town site. Whalan was incorporated in 1876. A post office was established at Whalan in 1869, and remained in operation until it was discontinued in 1993.

== Geography ==
According to the United States Census Bureau, the city has a total area of 0.43 square miles (1.11 km^{2}), of which 0.41 square miles (1.06 km^{2}) is land and 0.02 square miles (0.05 km^{2}) is water.

== Demographics ==
Historical population
Census	Pop.	Note	%±
1880	134		—
1890	98		−26.9%
1900	134		36.7%
1910	121		−9.7%
1920	142		17.4%
1930	155		9.2%
1940	190		22.6%
1950	176		−7.4%
1960	146		−17.0%
1970	114		−21.9%
1980	119		4.4%
1990	94		−21.0%
2000	64		−31.9%
2010	63		−1.6%
2020	67		6.3%
U.S. Decennial Census

=== 2010 census ===
As of the census of 2010, there were 63 people, 32 households, and 14 families living in the city. The population density was 153.7 inhabitants per square mile (59.3/km^{2}). There were 55 housing units at an average density of 134.1 per square mile (51.8/km^{2}). The racial makeup of the city was 100.0% White.

There were 32 households, of which 18.8% had children under the age of 18 living with them, 28.1% were married couples living together, 3.1% had a female householder with no husband present, 12.5% had a male householder with no wife present, and 56.3% were non-families. 53.1% of all households were made up of individuals, and 12.5% had someone living alone who was 65 years of age or older. The average household size was 1.97 and the average family size was 3.00.

The median age in the city was 46.3 years. 22.2% of residents were under the age of 18; 3.2% were between the ages of 18 and 24; 17.5% were from 25 to 44; 38.1% were from 45 to 64; and 19% were 65 years of age or older. The gender makeup of the city was 54.0% male and 46.0% female.

=== 2000 census ===
As of the census of 2000, there were 64 people, 34 households, and 16 families living in the city. The population density was 225.4 inhabitants per square mile (87.0/km^{2}). There were 45 housing units at an average density of 158.5 per square mile (61.2/km^{2}). The racial makeup of the city was 100.00% White.

There were 34 households, out of which 20.6% had children under the age of 18 living with them, 35.3% were married couples living together, 2.9% had a female householder with no husband present, and 52.9% were non-families. 47.1% of all households were made up of individuals, and 23.5% had someone living alone who was 65 years of age or older. The average household size was 1.88 and the average family size was 2.69.

In the city, the population was spread out, with 17.2% under the age of 18, 7.8% from 18 to 24, 21.9% from 25 to 44, 28.1% from 45 to 64, and 25.0% who were 65 years of age or older. The median age was 47 years. For every 100 females, there were 100.0 males. For every 100 females age 18 and over, there were 89.3 males.

The median income for a household in the city was $28,750, and the median income for a family was $31,875. Males had a median income of $16,875 versus $22,750 for females. The per capita income for the city was $17,680. None of the population and none of the families were below the poverty line.

== Trail connection ==
Whalan is one of several towns intersected by the Root River segment of the Blufflands State Trail.

== Stand Still Parade ==
Whalan hosts an annual Stand Still Parade in the 1 block downtown stretch of the town. Rather than moving through the streets, the parade stays still and spectators walk around the parade from beginning to end. In addition to the parade, they also offer food (Egg McWhalan), music and games.
