= Rushford, Minnesota =

City in Minnesota, United States

Rushford
- City
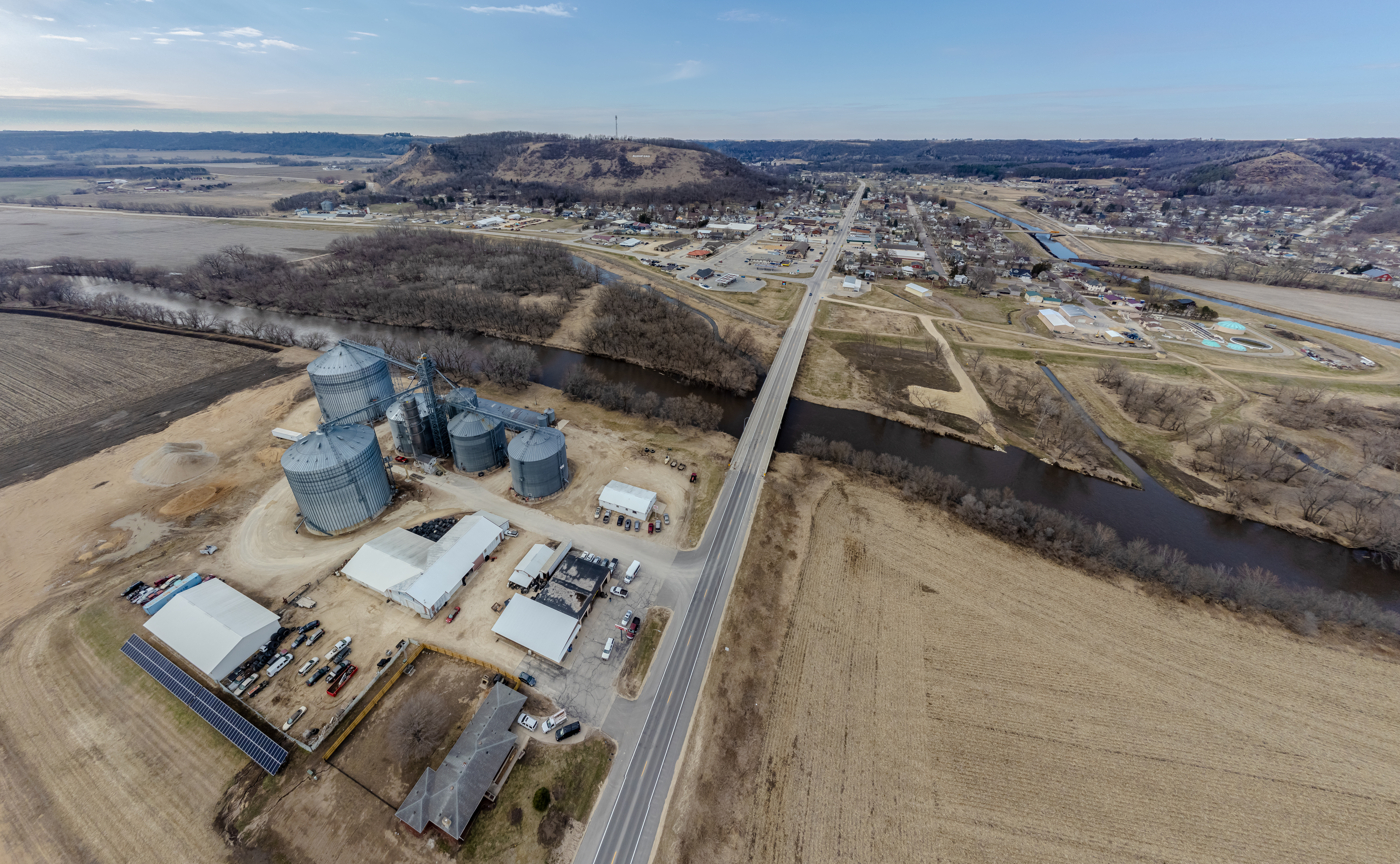

- Location of Rushford, Minnesota
- Coordinates: 43°48′45″N 91°45′05″W
- Country: United States
- State: Minnesota
- County: Fillmore

Government
  - Type: Mayor – Council
  - Mayor: Terri Benson

Area
  - Total: 1.67 sq mi (4.32 km^{2})
  - Land: 1.65 sq mi (4.27 km^{2})
  - Water: 0.019 sq mi (0.05 km^{2})
- Elevation: 728 ft (222 m)

Population (2020)
  - Total: 1,860
  - Density: 1,127/sq mi (435.2/km^{2})
- Time zone: UTC-6 (Central (CST))
  - Summer (DST): UTC-5 (CDT)
- ZIP code: 55971
- Area code: 507
- FIPS code: 27-56284
- GNIS feature ID: 2396449
- Website: www.rushford.govoffice.com

Rushford is a city in Fillmore County, Minnesota, United States. The population was 1,860 at the 2020 census.

== History ==
The first pioneers pole-boated up the Root River to the junction of Rush Creek, peering through 10-foot tall grasses to see what astonishing beauty the bluff lands had to offer. The early settlers gave Rushford its name on Christmas Day in 1854, during a chicken supper hosted by Capt. Dyer. The name stems from the nearby Rush Creek, which had tall Rushes growing along its banks. The area was once referred to as “Trail City” because seven Indian trails met at the creek. The Wieser Brothers were said to be the first founders of the city and quickly followed by hundreds.

Rushford has had a post office in operation since 1856, and the 1867 two-story Railroad Depot still stands at its original site, being restored as a Visitors Center for the local area.

As a result of the 2007 Midwest flooding, the city was flooded when Rush Creek overtopped the dikes.Then, Rushford bounced back to produce a bustling and thriving community.

== Geography ==
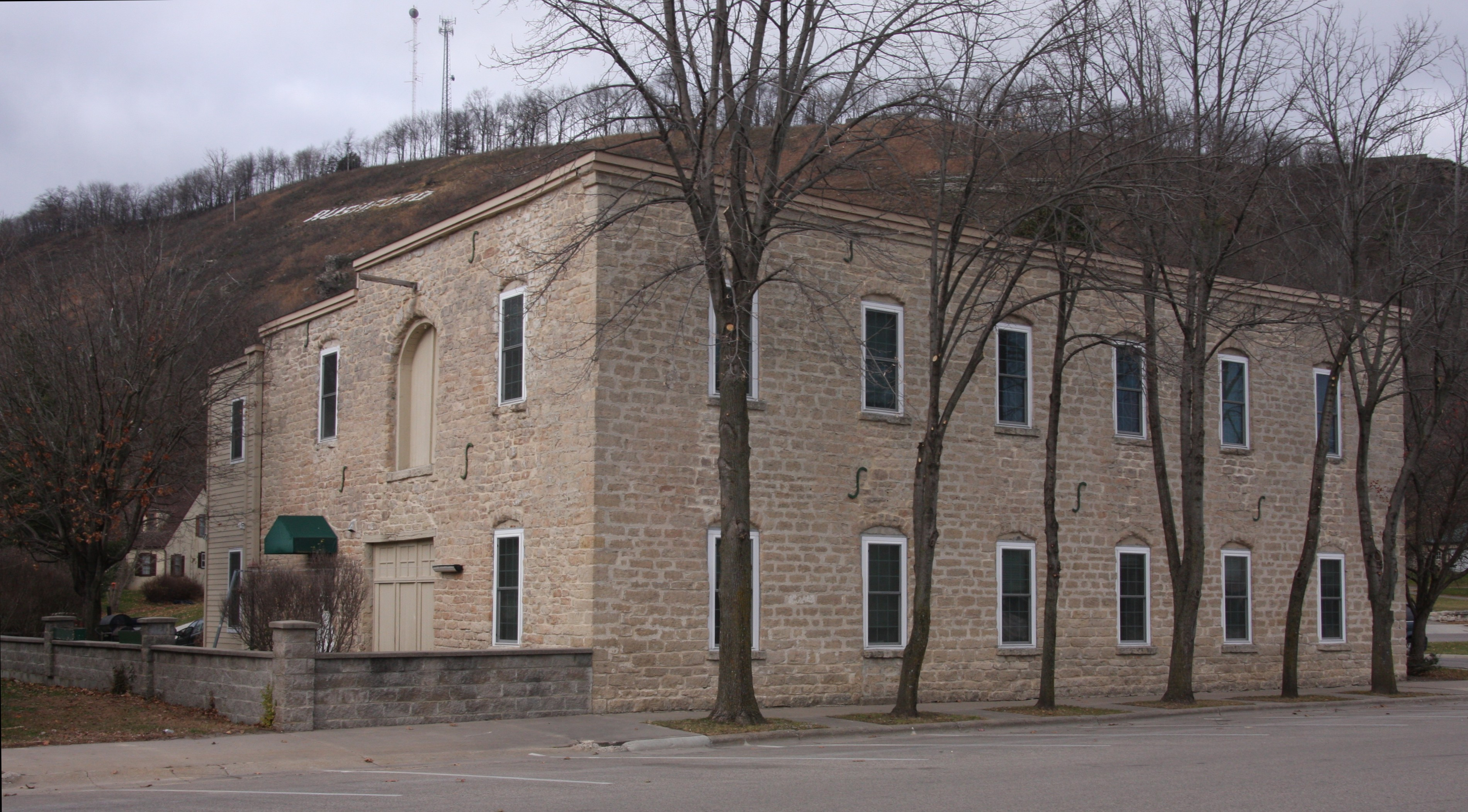
Rushford Wagon and Carriage Company, now an apartment building, with "Rushford" on the side of the bluff behind it.

According to the United States Census Bureau, the city has a total area of 1.73 square miles (4.48 km^{2}), of which 1.71 square miles (4.43 km^{2}) is land and 0.02 square miles (0.05 km^{2}) is water. The city of Rushford is completely surrounded by another city, Rushford Village.

Rushford is located in southeastern Minnesota's Bluff Country, part of the driftless area. Magelssen's Bluff, a 440-foot hill directly over the town, has the town name written in large white letters on the side of the hill.

Minnesota Highways 16, 30, and 43 are three of the main routes in the city.

=== Climate ===
Climate data for Rushford, Minnesota, 1991–2020 normals, extremes 1991–present
Month	Jan	Feb	Mar	Apr	May	Jun	Jul	Aug	Sep	Oct	Nov	Dec	Year
Record high °F (°C)	55 (13)	62 (17)	82 (28)	90 (32)	95 (35)	97 (36)	105 (41)	100 (38)	94 (34)	93 (34)	77 (25)	65 (18)	105 (41)
Mean maximum °F (°C)	44.7 (7.1)	49.3 (9.6)	65.0 (18.3)	78.7 (25.9)	86.9 (30.5)	91.3 (32.9)	92.3 (33.5)	91.0 (32.8)	87.1 (30.6)	81.3 (27.4)	65.0 (18.3)	49.6 (9.8)	94.5 (34.7)
Mean daily maximum °F (°C)	25.5 (−3.6)	30.1 (−1.1)	42.3 (5.7)	56.9 (13.8)	68.6 (20.3)	78.2 (25.7)	82.2 (27.9)	80.2 (26.8)	73.4 (23.0)	60.0 (15.6)	44.5 (6.9)	31.0 (−0.6)	56.1 (13.4)
Daily mean °F (°C)	15.4 (−9.2)	19.1 (−7.2)	31.3 (−0.4)	44.6 (7.0)	56.4 (13.6)	66.9 (19.4)	70.7 (21.5)	68.4 (20.2)	60.8 (16.0)	47.8 (8.8)	34.5 (1.4)	21.8 (−5.7)	44.8 (7.1)
Mean daily minimum °F (°C)	5.4 (−14.8)	8.1 (−13.3)	20.4 (−6.4)	32.3 (0.2)	44.2 (6.8)	55.6 (13.1)	59.3 (15.2)	56.7 (13.7)	48.2 (9.0)	35.5 (1.9)	24.4 (−4.2)	12.7 (−10.7)	33.6 (0.9)
Mean minimum °F (°C)	−18.0 (−27.8)	−13.9 (−25.5)	−1.7 (−18.7)	19.6 (−6.9)	30.2 (−1.0)	41.9 (5.5)	49.3 (9.6)	46.6 (8.1)	34.8 (1.6)	21.7 (−5.7)	8.8 (−12.9)	−9.1 (−22.8)	−22.2 (−30.1)
Record low °F (°C)	−43 (−42)	−46 (−43)	−21 (−29)	8 (−13)	20 (−7)	33 (1)	41 (5)	37 (3)	27 (−3)	15 (−9)	−12 (−24)	−27 (−33)	−46 (−43)
Average precipitation inches (mm)	1.07 (27)	1.06 (27)	1.78 (45)	3.91 (99)	4.63 (118)	5.72 (145)	4.26 (108)	4.66 (118)	3.96 (101)	2.75 (70)	1.75 (44)	1.34 (34)	36.89 (936)
Average snowfall inches (cm)	7.7 (20)	9.2 (23)	4.1 (10)	1.1 (2.8)	0.0 (0.0)	0.0 (0.0)	0.0 (0.0)	0.0 (0.0)	0.0 (0.0)	0.0 (0.0)	0.9 (2.3)	7.6 (19)	30.6 (77.1)
Average precipitation days (≥ 0.01 in)	5.4	4.7	6.0	9.4	11.9	11.4	8.5	8.5	8.1	7.9	5.1	6.0	92.9
Average snowy days (≥ 0.1 in)	3.8	3.8	1.2	0.3	0.0	0.0	0.0	0.0	0.0	0.0	0.5	3.5	13.1
Source 1: NOAA
Source 2: National Weather Service

== Recreation ==
Rushford Depot

Every five years, Rushford holds a citywide Homecoming celebration, with a standing invitation to all former residents of the city to return and visit. The town also hosts an annual celebration formerly called "Frontier Days," now called "Rushford Days."

Rushford is one of several towns intersected by the Root River segment of the Blufflands State Trail, a Rails to Trails project linking several small towns along 42 miles of the former railroad grade. The historic Rushford Depot (pictured to the right) is a landmark along this trail, with a museum inside the old depot and other historic buildings on the grounds.

Rushford also has several parks and a public swimming pool.

== Demographics ==
Historical population
Census	Pop.	Note	%±
1860	477		—
1870	1,245		161.0%
1880	941		−24.4%
1890	968		2.9%
1900	1,062		9.7%
1910	1,011		−4.8%
1920	1,142		13.0%
1930	1,125		−1.5%
1940	1,182		5.1%
1950	1,270		7.4%
1960	1,335		5.1%
1970	1,318		−1.3%
1980	1,478		12.1%
1990	1,485		0.5%
2000	1,696		14.2%
2010	1,731		2.1%
2020	1,860		7.5%
U.S. Decennial Census

=== 2020 census ===
As of the 2020 census, Rushford had a population of 1,860. The median age was 42.9 years. 24.4% of residents were under the age of 18 and 26.6% of residents were 65 years of age or older. For every 100 females there were 87.9 males, and for every 100 females age 18 and over there were 81.0 males age 18 and over.

0.0% of residents lived in urban areas, while 100.0% lived in rural areas.

There were 732 households in Rushford, of which 30.9% had children under the age of 18 living in them. Of all households, 48.8% were married-couple households, 13.5% were households with a male householder and no spouse or partner present, and 31.3% were households with a female householder and no spouse or partner present. About 31.7% of all households were made up of individuals and 16.8% had someone living alone who was 65 years of age or older.

There were 772 housing units, of which 5.2% were vacant. The homeowner vacancy rate was 1.7% and the rental vacancy rate was 3.0%.

Racial composition as of the 2020 census
Race	Number	Percent
White	1,768	95.1%
Black or African American	7	0.4%
American Indian and Alaska Native	0	0.0%
Asian	19	1.0%
Native Hawaiian and Other Pacific Islander	1	0.1%
Some other race	19	1.0%
Two or more races	46	2.5%
Hispanic or Latino (of any race)	12	0.6%

=== 2010 census ===
As of the census of 2010, there were 1,731 people, 706 households, and 456 families living in the city. The population density was 1,012.3 inhabitants per square mile (390.9/km^{2}). There were 772 housing units at an average density of 451.5 per square mile (174.3/km^{2}). The racial makeup of the city was 98.7% White, 0.1% Native American, 0.3% Asian, 0.2% from other races, and 0.7% from two or more races. Hispanic or Latino of any race were 0.8% of the population.

There were 706 households, of which 31.7% had children under the age of 18 living with them, 50.8% were married couples living together, 10.9% had a female householder with no husband present, 2.8% had a male householder with no wife present, and 35.4% were non-families. 30.9% of all households were made up of individuals, and 17.3% had someone living alone who was 65 years of age or older. The average household size was 2.35 and the average family size was 2.93.

The median age in the city was 41.9 years. 24.1% of residents were under the age of 18; 6.7% were between the ages of 18 and 24; 22.5% were from 25 to 44; 25.8% were from 45 to 64, and 21% were 65 years of age or older. The gender makeup of the city was 47.3% male and 52.7% female.

=== 2000 census ===
As of the census of 2000, there were 1,696 people, 704 households, and 433 families living in the city. The population density was 988.5 inhabitants per square mile (381.7/km^{2}). There were 761 housing units at an average density of 443.6 per square mile (171.3/km^{2}). The racial makeup of the city was 99.00% White, 0.24% African American, 0.12% Native American, 0.24% Asian, 0.29% from other races, and 0.12% from two or more races. 0.29% of the population were Hispanic or Latino of any race.

There were 704 households, out of which 29.3% had children under the age of 18 living with them, 52.1% were married couples living together, 8.1% had a female householder with no husband present, and 38.4% were non-families. 34.8% of all households were made up of individuals, and 22.2% had someone living alone who was 65 years of age or older. The average household size was 2.26 and the average family size was 2.93.

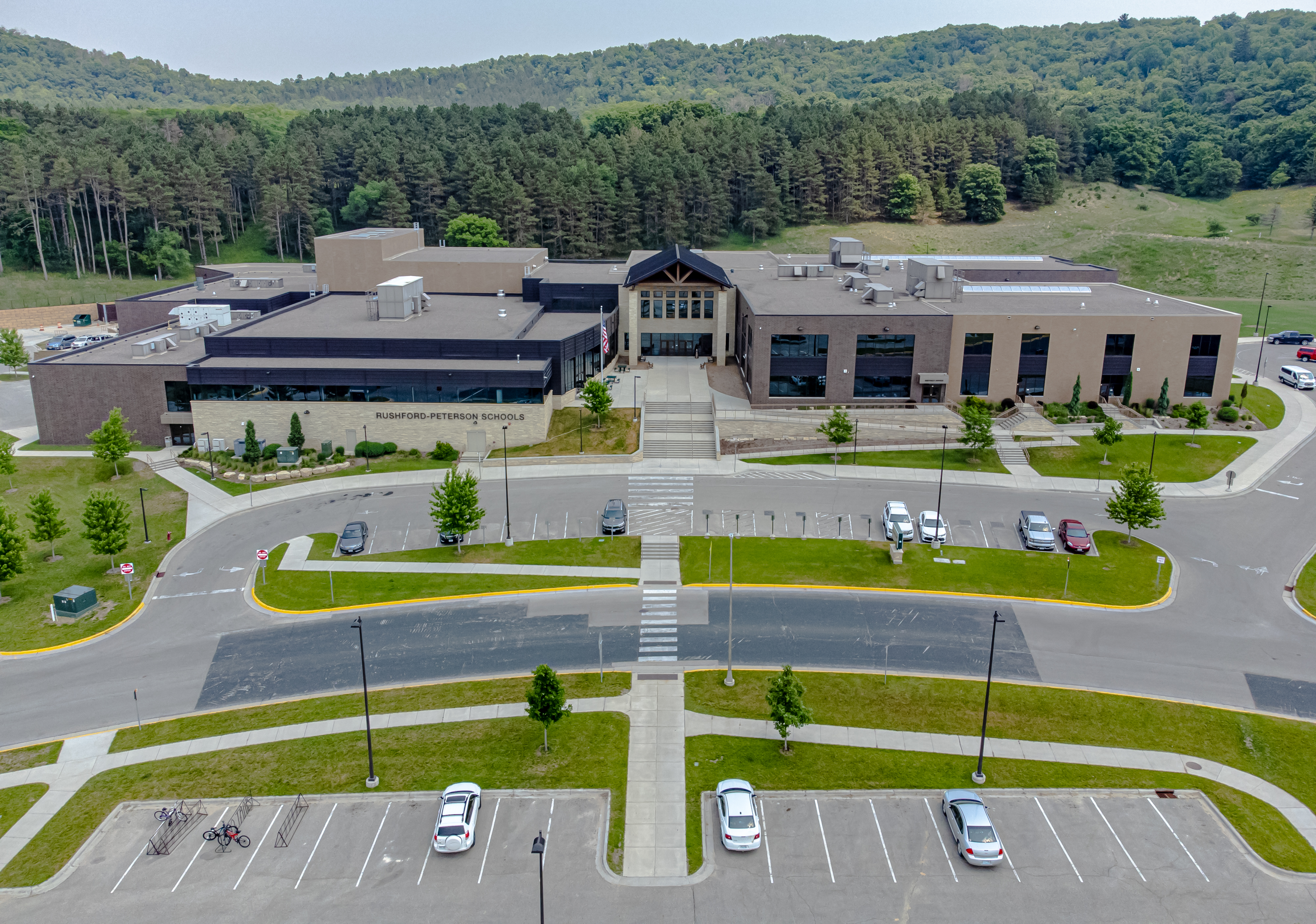
Rushford-Peterson Schools

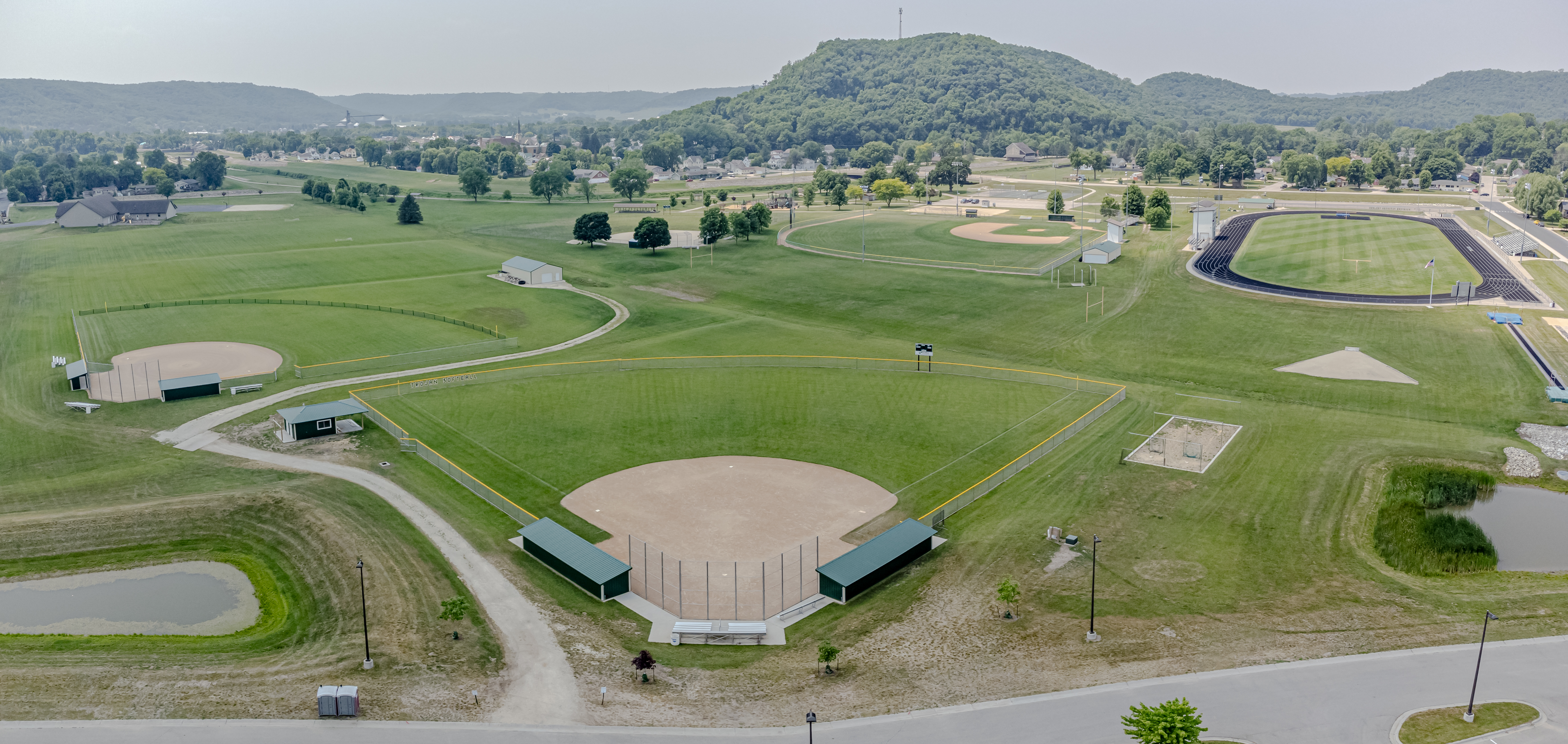
Athletic fields

== Education ==
Rushford is associated with nearby Peterson, Minnesota in Rushford-Peterson School District. Superintendent is Ben Bernard.

Rushford-Peterson School District held an open house on Saturday, Aug. 19, 2017 for the new 170,000-square-foot school building.

== Notable people ==
- Thomas H. Everts, physician, politician, and newspaper editor; lived in Rushford
- Steve Heiden, professional football coach and former player

== Gallery ==
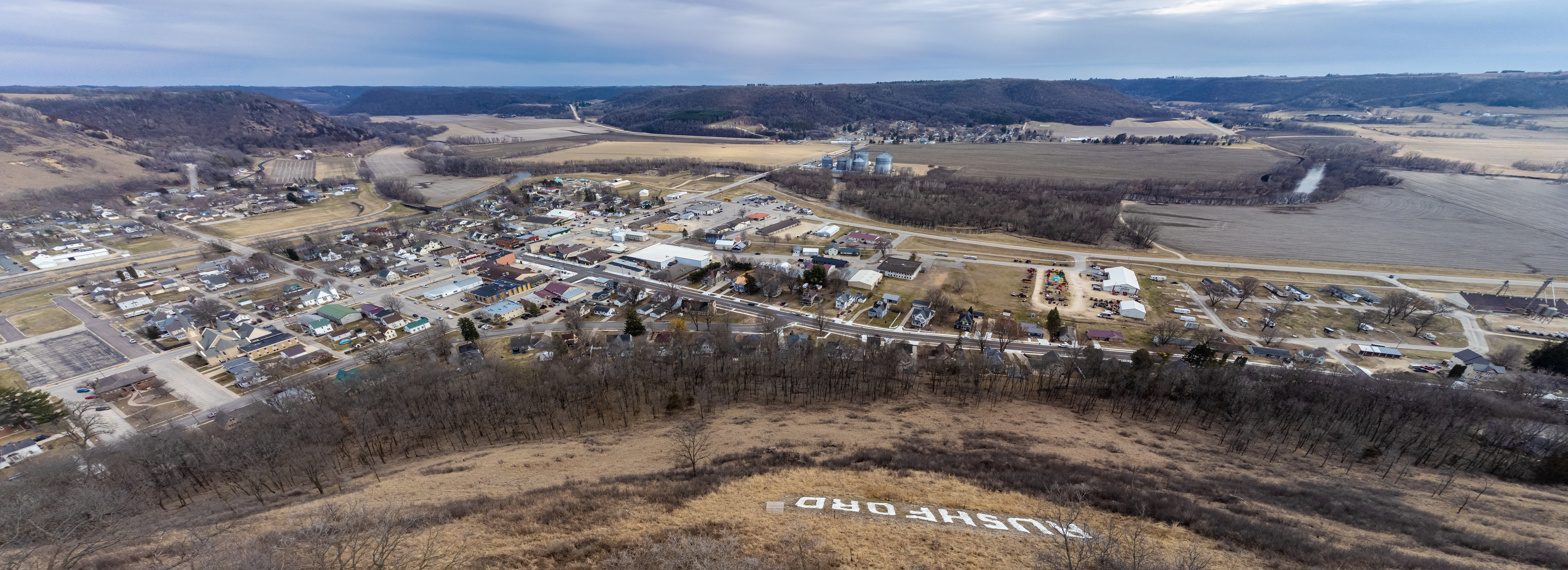
Rushford, Minnesota from hill

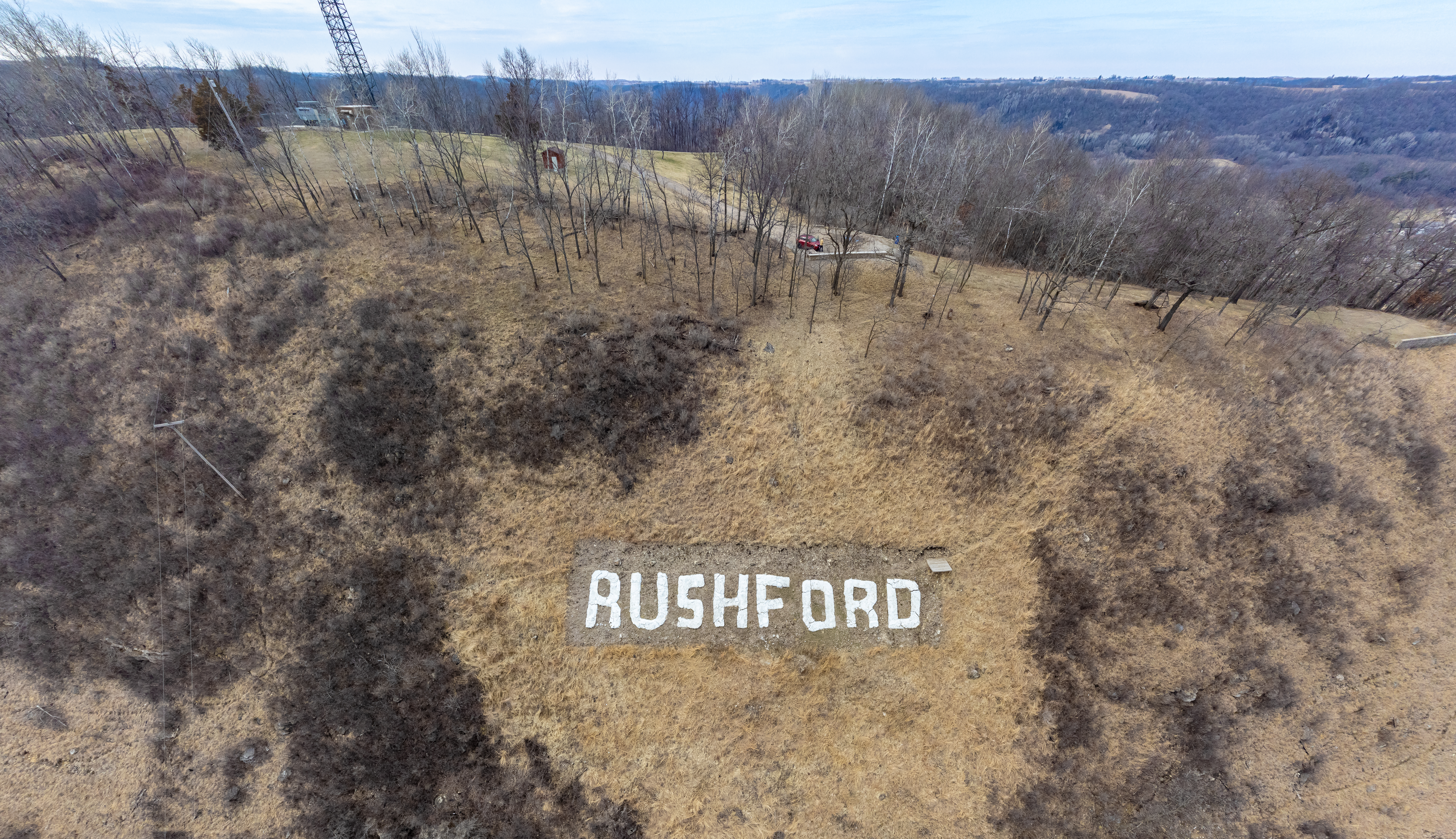
Rushford, Minnesota sign

== See also ==
- Rushford Public Library
- Rushford Municipal Airport
- Rushford Village
