= Peterson, Minnesota =

City in Minnesota, United States

Peterson
- City
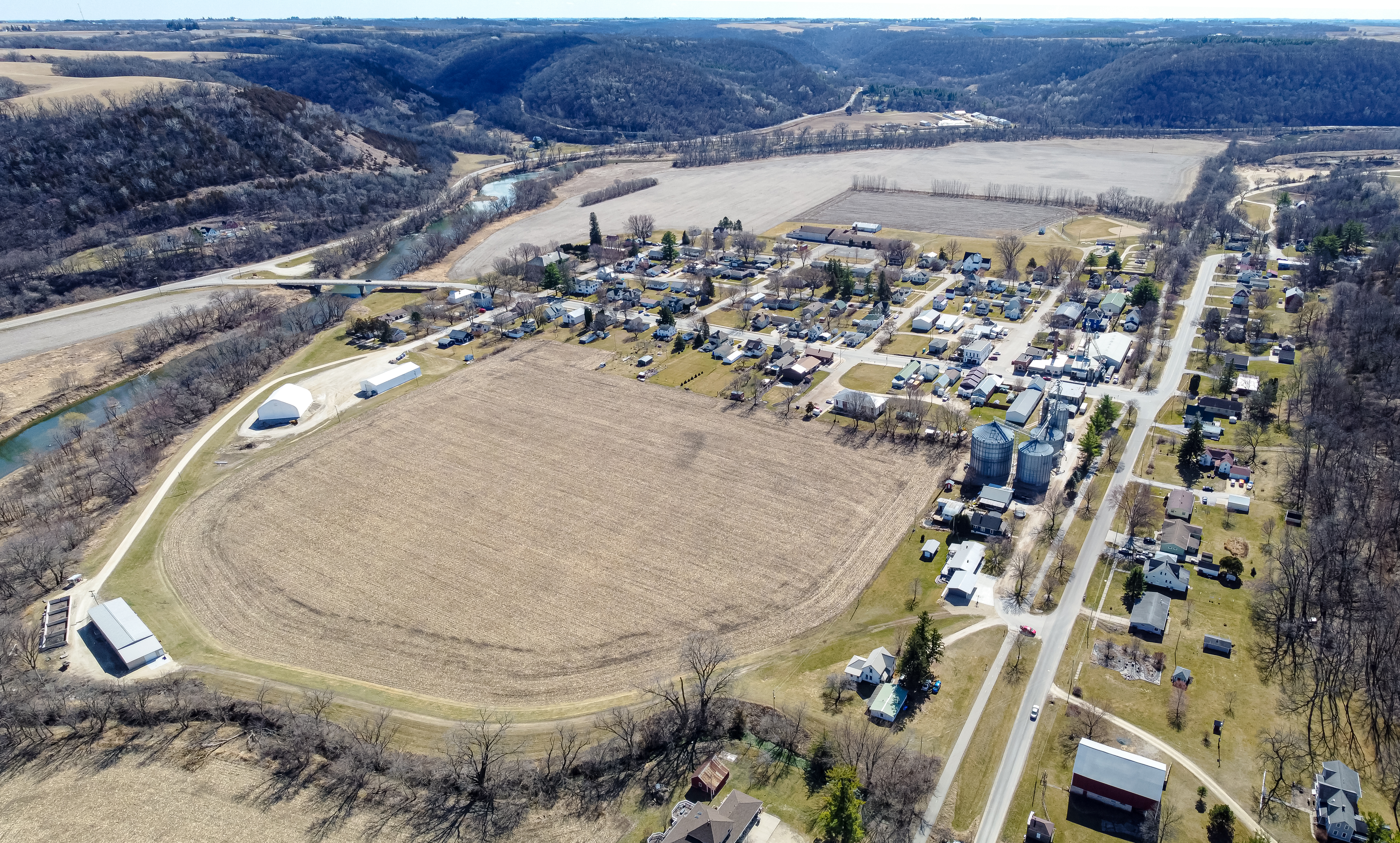
- Root River runs by town
- Motto: "A Hidden Treasure Nestled In The Bluffs Of Southeast Minnesota"
- Location of Peterson, Minnesota
- Coordinates: 43°47′13″N 91°50′00″W
- Country: United States
- State: Minnesota
- County: Fillmore

Area
  - Total: 0.49 sq mi (1.28 km^{2})
  - Land: 0.47 sq mi (1.23 km^{2})
  - Water: 0.019 sq mi (0.05 km^{2})
- Elevation: 748 ft (228 m)

Population (2020)
  - Total: 234
  - Density: 492.2/sq mi (190.04/km^{2})
- Time zone: UTC-6 (Central (CST))
  - Summer (DST): UTC-5 (CDT)
- ZIP code: 55962
- Area code: 507
- FIPS code: 27-50596
- GNIS feature ID: 2396194
- Website: https://www.petersonmn.com/

Peterson is a city in Fillmore County, Minnesota, United States. As of the 2020 census, Peterson had a population of 234.

== History ==
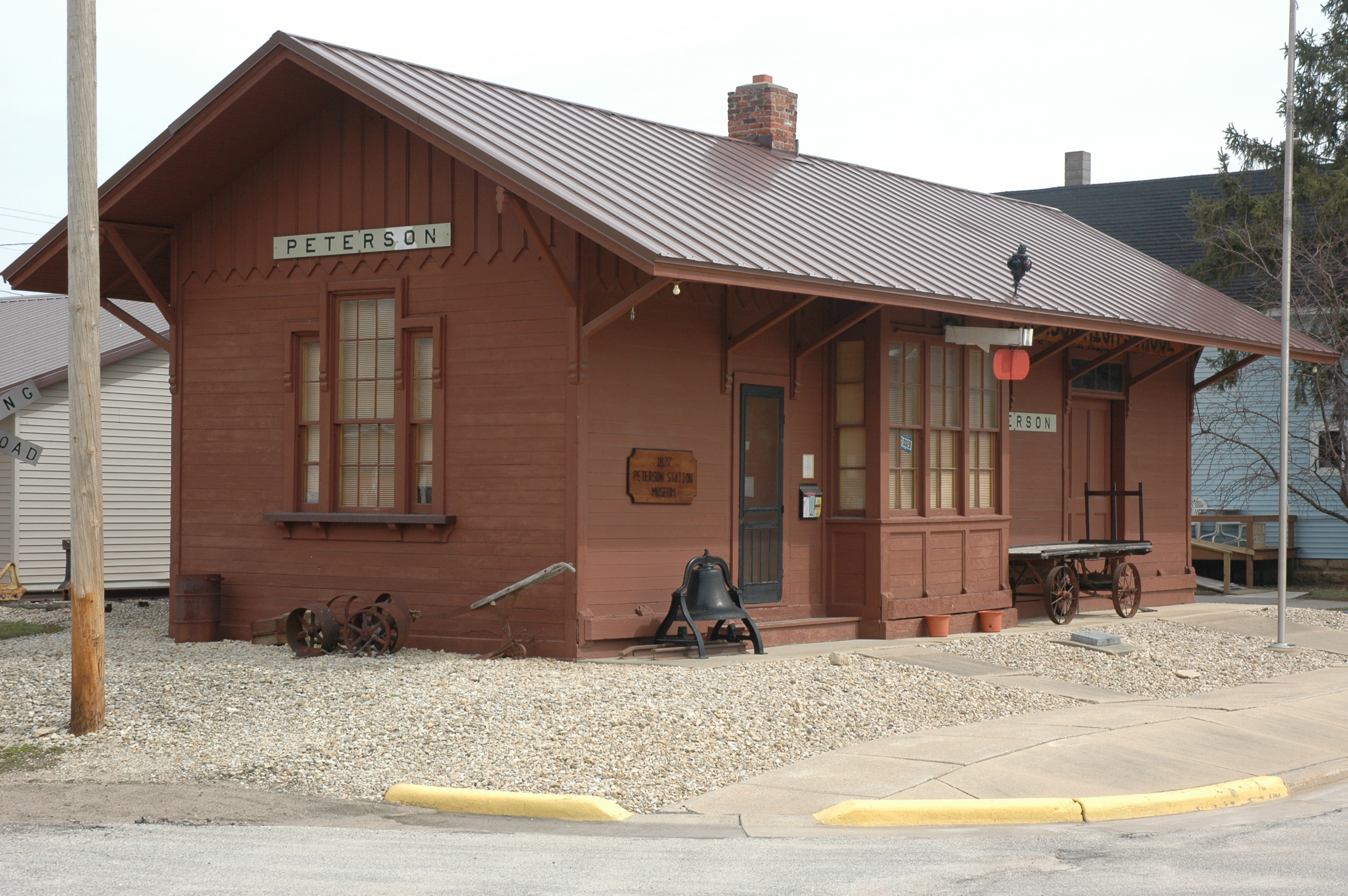
1877 Peterson Station Museum

In the year 1853, Peter Peterson Haslerud purchased and platted the village site of Peterson and was the major force behind its early growth and development. The community was named after him. After buying the land and platting the town, he was elected to the Minnesota State Legislature, served in several appointed positions and in 1856 was appointed by the Governor of Minnesota as Immigration officer for the 14th District of Minnesota. Peter was instrumental in bringing the railroad through Rushford Township in 1867 and he gave the railroad company fifteen acres of land and along with other citizens contributed $800. to secure a station and warehouse at Peterson. Peter began buying wheat from local farmers and shipping it back to the eastern part of the U.S.

In 1870, a post office was established in Peterson and Even A. Hjelie was appointed first postmaster. In 1871, Peter Peterson Haslerud developed a "trout farm" on his property outside Peterson and continued to expand the boundaries of the town.

In 1873, Ole Ensberg started a blacksmith shop and in 1874 an additional quarter section of land was laid out into lots and added to the village of Peterson. In 1875, two general stores, a hardware store, and a drug store were established. In 1875, the telegraph was installed at the railroad station and G.P. Haslerud (Peter Peterson Haslerud's oldest son) was appointed agent. Also in that year fifteen additional acres were platted and Prospect Park, Mill, Centennial, Fillmore, Church, and Myrtle Streets were named. In 1876, a mill was built with farmers living in the surrounding areas subscribing most of the stock. A livery barn, a steam mill, the Peterson Hotel, the Northwestern Bar and other small businesses opened for business.

In 1882, the Minnesota and Dakota Gazetteer, gave a contemporary description of Peterson:

"An unincorporated village of 100 inhabitants in Rushford Township, northeastern part of Fillmore County, and a station on the Southern Minnesota Railroad, 25 miles from Preston and 120 miles from Minneapolis. It is situated on the Root Rover which furnishes power to a flour mill at this point. A steam flour mill is also in operation in the village and there is a Lutheran church and district school. The exports are flour and wheat. Modes of communication are: Western Union Telegraph, American Express, two stages semi-weekly from Pilot Mound to Peterson via Arendahl and daily mail service."

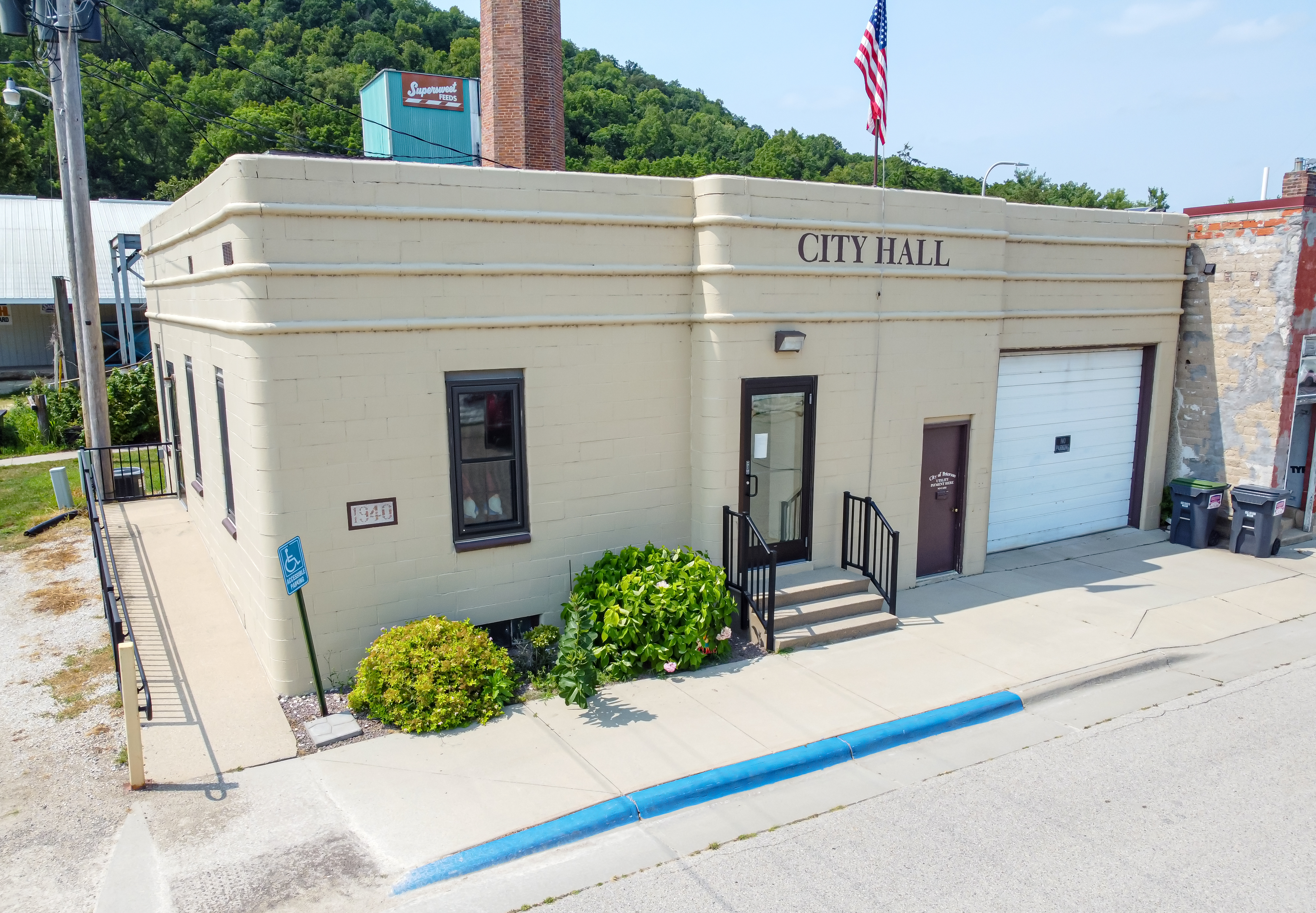
Peterson City Hall

Peterson was organized as a village in 1909.

== Founder of Peterson- Peter Peterson Haslerud ==
Born July 21, 1828, in Rollag Parish. Numedal, Norway, Peter was the son of Peter Knutsen Haslerud ( 1775- 1847) and Ingveborg Pedersdr Bole (1785- 1843). Very little is known about his early years, or that of his family however records show he emigrated to the United States at age 14 on May 14, 1843, with his sister Ragnild and her husband Gullick O. Laugen. Their ship "Hercules" set sail with 55 passengers from Norway and arrived in New York ninety seven days later.

There were many reasons for the emigrations from Norway to the United States in the 1800s but economics and/or religion usually played a big part and we don't know that of Peter Haslerud but we do know that one of the first churches in the village he founded was based on the principles of Hans Nielsen Hauge (see Wikipedia's entry on Hauge).

After early years in Wisconsin and Illinois (where he met and married Cornelia Aslaksdtter Anderson Teigen (born October 1, 1824- died April 15, 1892). the year 1853 brought Peter to the land that eventually became the town of Peterson, which is named after him. He plated and planned the village- seeing that schools and churches were built, naming streets and parks, establishing grain elevators and trout farms. The Trout Farm, or Trout Hatchery, has provided trout to stock Minnesota's lakes for over 150 years and is now operated by the State of Minnesota. By 1874 the hatchery supplied at least 100,000 yearling trout to stock waters for fishing.

Prior to 1874 Peter secured hundreds of acres of land in Fillmore County, Minnesota, was responsible for getting a railroad depot for Peterson, brought many businesses to Peterson, served in the Minnesota legislature, was appointed to several governmental positions and contributed to the culture and economy of Fillmore County as well as Peterson.

According to "The Peterson Book-1974" written and compiled by Ann Rislove and John Ericson ( now curator at Peterson Museum) businesses in Peterson in 1912 run by Peter's family members include Agrimson and Ensberg- General Merchandise, Moen Furniture, Carl Smaby- Peterson Herald Editor and Owner, Peterson Hardware, A, G, Haselrud, G.P. Haselrud and J.O. Ensberg- owners and operators of the French Burr Mill Factory, O.A.O. Moen -Mortician, Carl Johnson- City Band, Carl R. Moen- photographer. J.O. Ensberg was founder and owner of the factory and held several patents for original design of factory machinery and products.

First Structure in Peterson

The first structure in Peterson is Peter's home, The original house had a living room, kitchen and two bedrooms. Over the years as the family grew many more bedrooms were added and also, a second kitchen (called a "summer kitchen".), a music room (with a pipe organ imported from Europe,) extra large screened porches around two sides of the home, a much larger dining room and a second "sitting room" Sometime through the years the home came to be called "House of seven gables" and was occupied by Peter and his descendants until the year 2003.

Peter lived in the home from its origin in 1853 until his death in September 1880, his wife Cornelia died there in April 1892. Daughter Ingebord (Mary, Maria) born in 1858 lived in the family home with her family until her death in 1934; her children owned and occupied the home until the year 2003.

Peter and Cornelia had five children:

Son- George Peterson Haselerud (1852-1923) who married Gunhild (Julia) Maria Wethe in Peterson on May 4, 1876
Son-Andrew Peterson Haselerud (1855-1942) who married Gjertrud (Jane) . Ensberg on September 28, 1878
Daughter-Ingebord (Mary/Maria) Peterson Haselerud (1858-1934) -married Johannes Olson Engsberg on 9/28/1878
Daughter- Ann Cornelia Peterson Haselerud ( 1860-1863)
Daughter- Adeline Peterson Haselerud (1862- 1933) who married Elmer Halverson on September 1, 1883.

The oldest child, George Peterson Haselerud is supposedly the first white child born in Rushford, Minnesota township.

== Geography ==
According to the United States Census Bureau, the city has a total area of 0.51 square miles (1.32 km^{2}), of which 0.49 square miles (1.27 km^{2}) is land and 0.02 square miles (0.05 km^{2}) is water.

== Demographics ==
Historical population
Census	Pop.	Note	%±
1910	266		—
1920	291		9.4%
1930	291		0.0%
1940	331		13.7%
1950	318		−3.9%
1960	283		−11.0%
1970	269		−4.9%
1980	291		8.2%
1990	259		−11.0%
2000	269		3.9%
2010	199		−26.0%
2020	234		17.6%
U.S. Decennial Census

=== 2010 census ===
As of the census of 2010, there were 199 people, 97 households, and 60 families residing in the city. The population density was 406.1 inhabitants per square mile (156.8/km^{2}). There were 108 housing units at an average density of 220.4 per square mile (85.1/km^{2}). The racial makeup of the city was 99.5% White and 0.5% Native American. Hispanic or Latino of any race were 1.0% of the population.

There were 97 households, of which 19.6% had children under the age of 18 living with them, 51.5% were married couples living together, 8.2% had a female householder with no husband present, 2.1% had a male householder with no wife present, and 38.1% were non-families. 35.1% of all households were made up of individuals, and 16.5% had someone living alone who was 65 years of age or older. The average household size was 2.05 and the average family size was 2.63.

The median age in the city was 50.4 years. 16.6% of residents were under the age of 18; 6.9% were between the ages of 18 and 24; 19% were from 25 to 44; 32.1% were from 45 to 64; and 25.1% were 65 years of age or older. The gender makeup of the city was 49.7% male and 50.3% female.

=== 2000 census ===
As of the census of 2000, there were 269 people, 98 households, and 65 families residing in the city. The population density was 557.5 inhabitants per square mile (215.3/km^{2}). There were 118 housing units at an average density of 244.5 per square mile (94.4/km^{2}). The racial makeup of the city was 99.63% White and 0.37% Asian. Hispanic or Latino of any race were 0.74% of the population.

There were 98 households, out of which 21.4% had children under the age of 18 living with them, 57.1% were married couples living together, 7.1% had a female householder with no husband present, and 32.7% were non-families. 29.6% of all households were made up of individuals, and 14.3% had someone living alone who was 65 years of age or older. The average household size was 2.33 and the average family size was 2.83.

In the city, the population was spread out, with 19.0% under the age of 18, 6.3% from 18 to 24, 19.7% from 25 to 44, 23.4% from 45 to 64, and 31.6% who were 65 years of age or older. The median age was 48 years. For every 100 females, there were 96.4 males. For every 100 females age 18 and over, there were 100.0 males.

The median income for a household in the city was $35,781, and the median income for a family was $43,333. Males had a median income of $29,167 versus $22,708 for females. The per capita income for the city was $14,728. About 12.1% of families and 12.4% of the population were below the poverty line, including 20.0% of those under the age of eighteen and 7.5% of those 65 or over.

== Parks and recreation ==
Peterson is one of several towns intersected by the Root River segment of the Blufflands State Trail.
