= Stewartville Formation =

Geologic formation in Iowa and Minnesota, USA

- Stratigraphic range: Ordovician
- Type: Formation

Location
- Country: United States
- Extent: Iowa and Minnesota

The Stewartville Formation is a geologic formation primarily located in northeastern Iowa and Olmsted County, Minnesota. It preserves fossils dating back to the Ordovician period. The limestone and dolostone rock contains the fossils of Cephalopods, Gastropods, Receptaculites.

== Interesting features ==
Stewartville is known tunnels dug ancient Ordovician worms. They dug tunnels throughout the soft sediments, depositing weaker substrates which then cemented into the hard limestone. Those weaker substrates erode more easily and cause deformations in the surface.

== See also ==
- List of fossiliferous stratigraphic units in Iowa
- Paleontology in Iowa
