= National Register of Historic Places listings in Fillmore County, Minnesota =

Location of Fillmore County in Minnesota

This is a list of the National Register of Historic Places listings in Fillmore County, Minnesota. It is intended to be a complete list of the properties and districts on the National Register of Historic Places in Fillmore County, Minnesota, United States. The locations of National Register properties and districts for which the latitude and longitude coordinates are included below, may be seen in an online map.

There are 37 properties and districts listed on the National Register in the county.

This National Park Service list is complete through NPS recent listings posted September 26, 2025.

== History ==
Fillmore County's National Register properties reflect its development as an agricultural region typical of Southeast Minnesota. Euro-American settlement began in the 1850s and initially relied on rivers and stagecoach roads for transportation. The Forestville Townsite, now a living history museum, preserves a portion of one of these early communities. Several towns vied for county seat status; the William Strong House in Carimona and the Fillmore County Jail and Carriage House in Preston were nominated as the best surviving structures representing this period.

Fillmore County's many rivers and streams powered a milling region of statewide importance before Minneapolis achieved primacy. Additionally, properties like the Quickstad Farm Implement Company and Rushford Wagon and Carriage Company represent the agricultural focus of manufacturing in the county. The Gilded Age prosperity of population centers like Spring Valley and Chatfield is reflected by other listings, several of which are noted for their architecture.

== Current listings ==
	Name on the Register	Image	Date listed	Location	City or town	Description
1	Allis Barn	Allis Barn	April 27, 1982 (#82005038)	24461 Heron Rd. 43°42′40″N 92°01′58″W	Carrollton Township	Three-story barn built circa 1899, associated with 19th-century stock farming and Milwaukee's Allis-Chalmers company, a key Midwestern manufacturer of milling equipment. Now the centerpiece of a resort.
2	Francis H. Bartlett House	Francis H. Bartlett House	May 24, 1984 (#84001410)	135 S. Gold St. 43°42′21″N 92°16′07″W	Wykoff	1876 Second Empire house of Wykoff's co-founder, built the same year the town was incorporated.
3	Bridge No. 5722	Bridge No. 5722	July 20, 2011 (#11000467)	N. Section St. (U.S. Route 63) over Spring Valley Creek; 43°41′17″N 92°23′21″W	Spring Valley	1936 bridge on a concrete box culvert, an unusual basis for a bridge on a U.S. highway.
4	Bridge No. L4770	Bridge No. L4770	November 6, 1989 (#89001827)	Township Road 213 over Mahoney Creek; 43°44′23″N 92°05′39″W	Fountain	Short, semicircular stone arch bridge built circa 1915, of a distinctive type developed by the State Highway Commission in the 1910s for use in rural southeast Minnesota. Demolished, photo is of the site only.
5	Chatfield Public Library	Chatfield Public Library	April 27, 1982 (#82005033)	314 Main St. S. 43°50′41″N 92°11′14″W	Chatfield	1915 Prairie School Carnegie library designed by Claude and Starck.
6	Chicago, Milwaukee, St. Paul and Pacific Railroad Depot	Chicago, Milwaukee, St. Paul and Pacific Railroad Depot	March 5, 2018 (#100002162)	W. Prairie Ave. & Main St. N. 43°31′47″N 91°55′48″W	Canton	Passenger and freight depot in use 1881–1949; a significant contributor to Canton's economic growth.
7	Commercial House Hotel	Commercial House Hotel	July 19, 2001 (#01000747)	146 S. Broadway; 43°41′13″N 92°23′29″W	Spring Valley	Hotel built in 1874 and twice expanded, a key amenity in the commercial development of Spring Valley from the railroad into the automobile era.
8	Daniel Dayton House	Daniel Dayton House	December 6, 1977 (#77000732)	Off County Highway 17; 43°34′46″N 92°04′13″W	Harmony	One of Minnesota's few surviving stagecoach inns, built in 1857 on the Dubuque–St. Paul Stage Road. Also noted for its stone architecture and association with Harmony Township's pioneer era.
9	Samuel Thompson Dickson House	Samuel Thompson Dickson House	August 15, 1985 (#85001755)	225 3rd St. SW; 43°50′35″N 92°11′28″W	Chatfield	1863 house of a prosperous mill owner, best surviving symbol of Chatfield's once-robust flour milling industry.
10	Fillmore County Jail and Carriage House	Fillmore County Jail and Carriage House	March 5, 1982 (#82002947)	109 Houston St. NW; 43°40′15″N 92°05′07″W	Preston	Fillmore County's long-serving law complex, with an Italianate jail/office/residence built 1869–70 and adjacent carriage house built circa 1900. Now a bed and breakfast.
11	Forestville Townsite-Meighan Store	Forestville Townsite-Meighan Store	April 13, 1973 (#73000976)	21899 County Rd. 118; 43°38′34″N 92°12′54″W	Forestville Township	1853 townsite representative of the rapid frontier settlement following the treaties of 1851. Also associated with populist political figures William and Thomas Meighan. Now a Minnesota Historical Society living history museum.
12	George H. Haven House	George H. Haven House	November 19, 1982 (#82000559)	132 Winona St. 43°50′50″N 92°11′11″W	Chatfield	1874 Italianate house with an 1892 Greek Revival annex.
13	Inspiration Point Wayside Rest	Inspiration Point Wayside Rest	November 16, 2015 (#15000790)	MN 16, 2 mi. SW. of Cty. Rd. 21; 43°41′39″N 91°59′48″W	Lanesboro	One of Minnesota's early NPS rustic style roadside parks established by the state highway department with New Deal assistance, constructed 1934–37, and its only surviving example built by a Civilian Conservation Corps erosion control camp.
14	Lanesboro Historic District	Lanesboro Historic District	September 9, 1982 (#82002946)	Roughly Kirkwood, Coffee, and Parkway Sts. 43°43′15″N 91°58′37″W	Lanesboro	Well-preserved commercial and industrial districts of a 19th-century milling and railroad town, with 36 contributing properties.
15	Lenora Methodist Episcopal Church	Lenora Methodist Episcopal Church	November 19, 1982 (#82001892)	County Highways 23 and 24; 43°34′26″N 91°52′48″W	Lenora	Church built 1856–1865, anchor of one of Fillmore County's few settlements established before railroad access.
16	Ellen M. Lovell House	Ellen M. Lovell House	November 19, 1982 (#82001893)	218 Winona St. 43°50′48″N 92°11′10″W	Chatfield	1896 house also known as Oakwenwald Terrace, nominated as one of Minnesota's leading examples of Shingle style architecture. Now a bed and breakfast.
17	McMichael Grain Elevator	McMichael Grain Elevator	March 24, 2023 (#100008805)	205 Main Ave. N. 43°33′23″N 92°00′37″W	Harmony	Well-preserved example of a wooden crib-framed grain elevator, built in 1879 by an important regional grain trading company on a rail line instrumental in the development of Harmony and its surroundings.
18	Milwaukee Elevator	Milwaukee Elevator	May 31, 2006 (#06000454)	Fillmore St. and Root River State Trail; 43°40′14″N 92°04′46″W	Preston	1902 grain elevator typifying the engineering and construction of such structures in rural Minnesota.
19	Norway Township Stone House	Norway Township Stone House	April 27, 1982 (#82005034)	County Highway 10; 43°43′49″N 91°46′58″W	Rushford	Circa-1870s house significant for its locally unique masonry construction and its association with Fillmore County's Norwegian immigrant settlement, particularly Norway Township—one of southeast Minnesota's earliest and largest such communities.
20	Parsons Block and Hall	Parsons Block and Hall	November 19, 1982 (#82000560)	112 S. Broadway; 43°41′15″N 92°23′28″W	Spring Valley	Elaborate 1871 Italianate building with a second-floor meeting hall, which provided essential commercial and social space in burgeoning Spring Valley. Destroyed by a fire in 2017.
21	Bernard H. Pietenpol Workshop and Garage	Bernard H. Pietenpol Workshop and Garage	April 27, 1982 (#82002949)	16044 County Highway 5; 43°35′17″N 92°17′19″W	Cherry Grove	1921 workshop of Bernard Pietenpol (1901–1984), pioneering designer of homemade aircraft.
22	Preston Brewery	Preston Brewery	April 27, 1982 (#82005035)	Bluff St. 43°40′24″N 92°04′38″W	Preston	1859 brewery, Fillmore County's oldest surviving industrial building and a symbol of Preston's early settlement.
23	Preston Overlook	Preston Overlook	August 4, 2003 (#03000732)	On U.S. Route 52; 43°40′25″N 92°04′25″W	Preston	Exemplary early Minnesota highway wayside, built 1937–38. Also noted for its National Park Service rustic design by landscape architect Arthur R. Nichols.
24	Quickstad Farm Implement Company	Quickstad Farm Implement Company	April 27, 1982 (#82005036)	414–418 Mill St. 43°47′11″N 91°50′03″W	Peterson	1875 and 1901 buildings representative of the area's agricultural manufacturing economy. The latter building also exemplifies Fillmore County's stone industrial facilities.
25	Rushford City Mill	Rushford City Mill	April 27, 1982 (#82002806)	301 Winona St. 43°48′52″N 91°45′20″W	Rushford	1875 mill representing Rushford's industrial development and Fillmore County's importance as Minnesota's first wheat and flour producing region.
26	Rushford Wagon and Carriage Company	Rushford Wagon and Carriage Company	April 27, 1982 (#82002948)	264 W. Park St. 43°48′33″N 91°45′18″W	Rushford	Sole remaining building of a factory complex established in 1872, source of the widely used Rushford Wagon and a symbol of Rushford's agricultural manufacturing industry.
27	Michael Scanlan House	Michael Scanlan House	April 27, 1982 (#82005037)	708 Parkway S. 43°42′46″N 91°58′35″W	Lanesboro	Circa-1892 Queen Anne house of a prominent Lanesboro resident active in commerce and politics. Now a bed and breakfast.
28	Southern Minnesota Depot	Southern Minnesota Depot	June 20, 1986 (#86001363)	401 S. Elm St. 43°48′25″N 91°45′19″W	Rushford	1867 railway station symbolizing the impact of the Southern Minnesota Railroad on Rushford, whose development exploded upon becoming the line's western terminus. Now a museum and visitor center.
29	Spring Valley Carnegie Library	Spring Valley Carnegie Library	April 27, 1982 (#82002951)	201 S. Broadway; 43°41′12″N 92°23′26″W	Spring Valley	1904 Carnegie library noted as an intact small-town example of Beaux-Arts architecture and as a symbol of Spring Valley's early-20th-century progressivism.
30	Spring Valley Mausoleum	Spring Valley Mausoleum	April 27, 1982 (#82004911)	Spring Valley Cemetery; 43°40′57″N 92°22′49″W	Spring Valley	Mausoleum built 1913–14 as a symbol of Spring Valley's rising affluence and modernity during the Progressive Era.
31	Spring Valley Methodist Episcopal Church	Spring Valley Methodist Episcopal Church	May 12, 1975 (#75000979)	221 W. Courtland St. 43°41′17″N 92°23′35″W	Spring Valley	Victorian Gothic church built 1876–78, noted for its polychrome façade and numerous stained glass windows. Now a museum.
32	Ephraim Steffens House	Ephraim Steffens House	April 27, 1982 (#82002952)	404 N. Broadway; 43°41′29″N 92°23′33″W	Spring Valley	1877 Victorian Gothic house of a prosperous local entrepreneur and politician.
33	William Strong House	William Strong House	April 27, 1982 (#82002953)	508 N. Huron Ave. 43°41′35″N 92°23′44″W	Spring Valley	1879 Second Empire house of wealthy local banker William H. Strong (d. 1909).
34	William Strong House	William Strong House	April 27, 1982 (#82005040)	County Highway 12; 43°39′37″N 92°09′32″W	Carimona Township	William Strong's earlier house, dating to the late 1850s; the only surviving structure of an 1853 village significant to Fillmore County's early settlement and government.
35	Tunnel Mill	Tunnel Mill	May 12, 1975 (#75000978)	28036 County Highway 1; 43°45′43″N 92°22′48″W	Spring Valley	1871 gristmill uniquely powered by a tunnel shortcutting a horseshoe bend in a creek; the last surviving representative of one of Minnesota's key milling regions in northwestern Fillmore County. Now a craft smithing center.
36	Walker and Valentine House	Walker and Valentine House	April 27, 1982 (#82005039)	504 High St. 43°48′55″N 91°45′18″W	Rushford	Semi-detached house built 1859–61 for two of Rushford's founders and early industrial entrepreneurs. Also noted for its local stone construction.
37	Wykoff Commercial Historic District	Wykoff Commercial Historic District	August 5, 1994 (#94000831)	100 S. Gold–123 N. Gold St. 43°42′26″N 92°16′06″W	Wykoff	Well preserved and architecturally cohesive commercial district of a railway-based agricultural center, with 17 contributing properties mostly dating to the 1890s.

== See also ==
- List of National Historic Landmarks in Minnesota
- National Register of Historic Places listings in Minnesota
