= Fahrenholz =

Fahrenholz or Fahrenholtz is a German surname. Notable people with the surname include:

- Heinrich Fahrenholz (1882–1945), German zoologist
- Josef Fahrenholtz (born 2001), American basketball player
- Loretta Fahrenholz (born 1981), German artist
- Peter Fahrenholtz, German diplomat
- Tim Fahrenholz (born 1994), German footballer
