= Daniel Dayton House =

- U.S. National Register of Historic Places
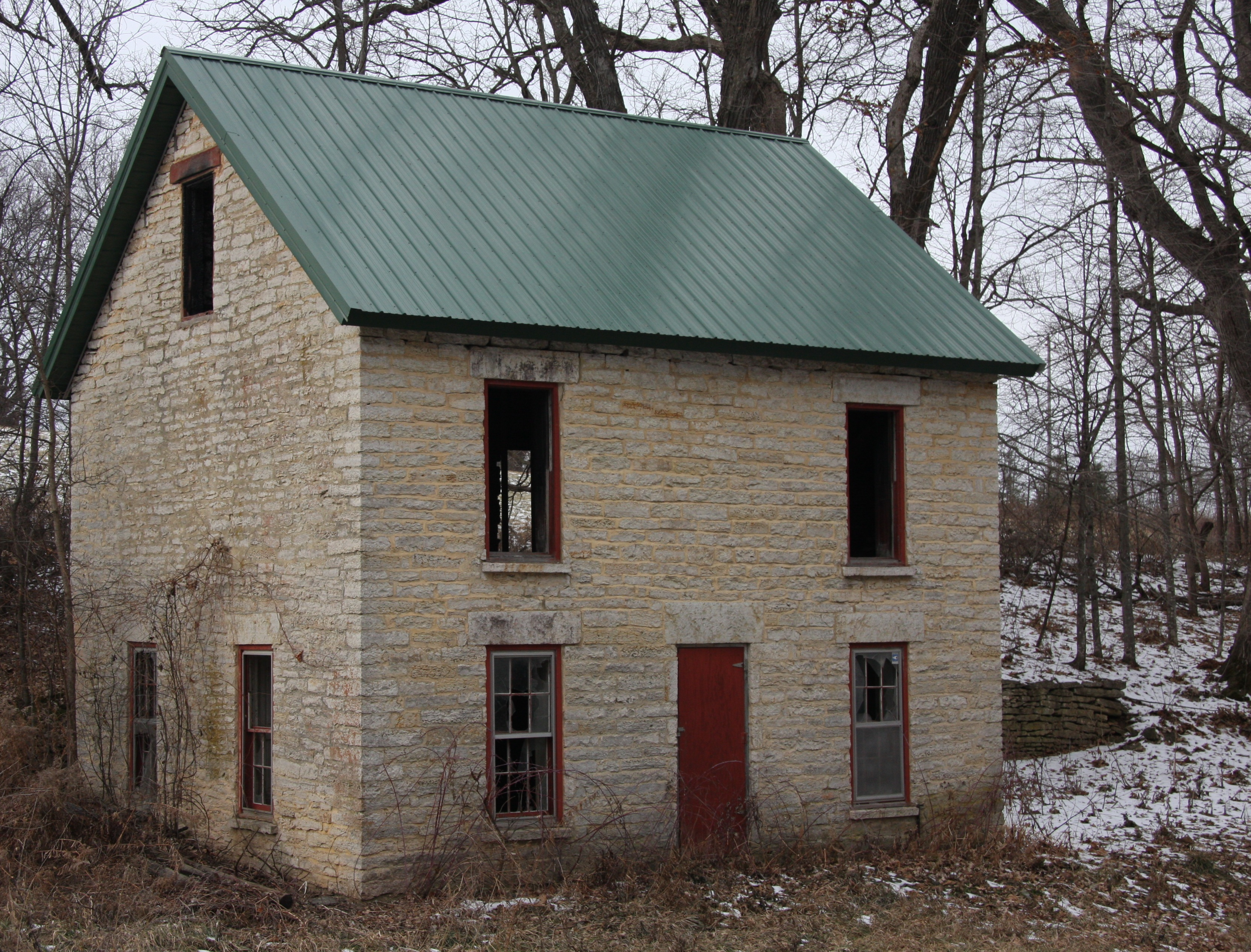
- The Daniel Dayton House viewed from the southeast

- Location within Minnesota Location within the United States
- Location: off County Highway 17, Harmony Township, Minnesota
- Coordinates: 43°34′46.3″N 92°4′13.3″W
- Area: Less than two acres
- Built: 1857
- Architectural style: Greek Revival
- NRHP reference No.: 77000732
- Designated: December 6, 1977

The Daniel Dayton House, also known as Ravine House, is a historic stagecoach inn in Harmony Township, Minnesota, United States. It was built in 1857 as an overnight stop on the Dubuque–St. Paul Stage Road, a frontier mail and stagecoach route through Iowa and Minnesota. The house was listed on the National Register of Historic Places in 1977 for its local significance in the themes of architecture, exploration/settlement, and transportation. It was nominated for being one of Minnesota's few surviving stagecoach inns, for its stone architecture, and for its association with the pioneer era of Harmony Township.

== Origins ==
The first settler-colonists moved to what would be known as Harmony, in southeast Minnesota Territory, in 1853. A primary concern was establishing regular communication and trade between local residents and other communities.

The answer came a year later when the Dubuque–St. Paul Trail was established and Harmony Township was chosen as a stop along the 272-mile (438 km) mail and stagecoach route. Recent immigrant Daniel Dayton, seeing a business opportunity in the trail's arrival, built a single-story log building in 1855 in the village of Big Spring, 3.5 miles (5.6 km) northwest of Harmony. He first provided food and drinks to weary travelers but soon offered overnight accommodations.

In 1857, Dayton built a two-and-a-half-story limestone addition to the structure with walls that were 20 inches (51 cm) thick. Its windows, arranged in a six-over-six pattern, had double-hung sashes, limestone sills, and detailed lintels. Its gabled, pitched roof supported two brick chimneys.

== Use ==
Dayton painted "Ravine House" on a shingle and hung it above the building's front door to welcome visitors. The first and second floors contained framed beds, slide-out trundles, and floor mattresses for overnight guests; extra sleeping space was available in the small attic. In addition to providing rooms to travelers, Ravine House also functioned as a livery, a store, a post office, and a private farm residence.

Dayton and his sons, Aaron and Zara, operated Ravine House as an overnight stop for stagecoach travelers until 1866, when use of the Dubuque–St. Paul Trail declined due to the arrival of the railroads. Although a railroad line (the Milwaukee Road) wouldn't arrive in Harmony until 1879, other lines opened across the region in the 1860s and 1870s, drawing away traffic from the once-busy stage route.

While operating Ravine House, Dayton served in the Minnesota Legislature and as Harmony Township's chairman, clerk, and postmaster.

== Later history ==
Daniel Dayton died in 1895. Ravine House was then used as a private residence for several decades until 1952, when it was abandoned and used as feed and hay storage for livestock.

The building soon fell into disrepair. A passionate group of local preservationists, however, decided to renovate it in the 1970s. Work crews replaced the windows and roof, repaired wood floors, and stabilized the foundation. Every effort was made to return the historic structure to its original condition, and in 1977, Ravine House was added to the National Register. It is currently in poor condition with the upper windows missing and the interior heavily damaged.

== See also ==
- National Register of Historic Places listings in Fillmore County, Minnesota
