= Chatfield High School =

Chatfield High School may refer to:

- Chatfield High School (Colorado)
- Chatfield High School (Minnesota)
