= Journalist =

Person who collects, writes and distributes news and similar information

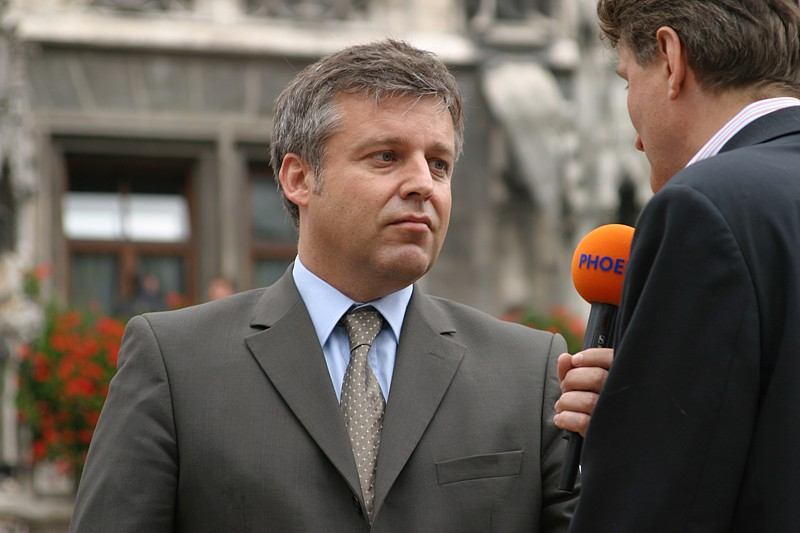
- Heinz Abels interviewing Peter Fahrenholtz.

Occupation
- Names: Journalist
- Occupation type: Journalism, mass media
- Activity sectors: Mass media, public relations, politics, sports, business

Description
- Competencies: Writing skills, interpersonal skills
- Education required: Typically a bachelor's degree
- Fields of employment: Mass media
- Related jobs: Correspondent, columnist, spokesperson, politician

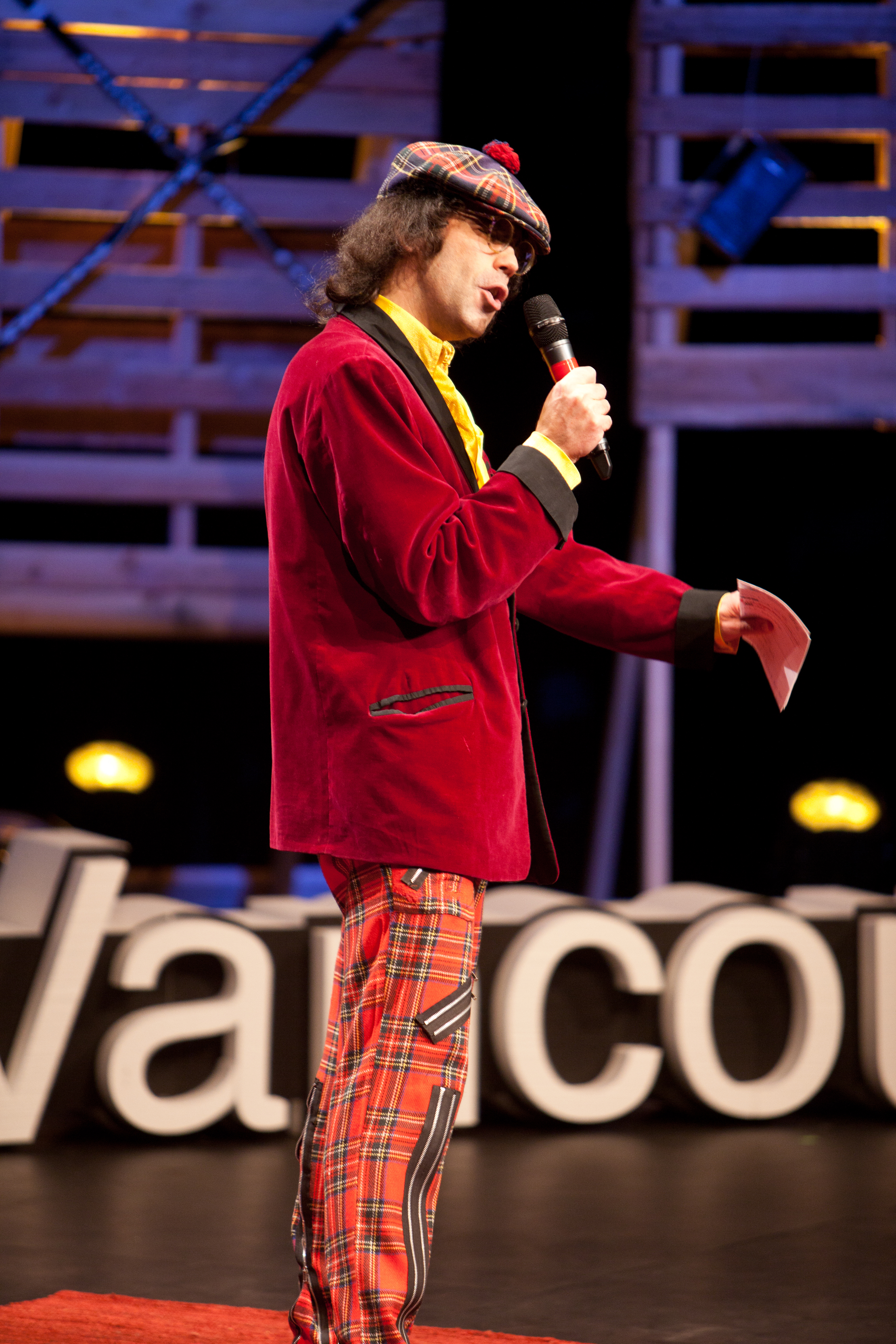
Canadian journalist Nardwuar at TEDxVancouver in 2010

A journalist is a person who gathers information in the form of text, audio or pictures, processes it into a newsworthy form and disseminates it to the public. This process is called journalism.

== Roles ==
Journalists can work in broadcast, print, advertising, or public relations. Depending on the form of journalism, "journalist" may also describe various categories of people by the roles they play in the process. These include reporters, correspondents, citizen journalists, editors, editorial writers, columnists, and photojournalists.

A reporter is a type of journalist who researches, writes and reports on information in order to present using sources. This may entail conducting interviews, information-gathering and/or writing articles. Reporters may split their time between working in a newsroom, from home or outside to witness events or interview people. Reporters may be assigned a specific beat (area of coverage). Young trainee reporters are sometimes called a "cub reporter".

Matthew C. Nisbet, who has written on science communication, has defined a "knowledge journalist" as a public intellectual who, like Walter Lippmann, Fareed Zakaria, Naomi Klein, Michael Pollan, and Andrew Revkin, sees their role as researching complicated issues of fact or science which most laymen would not have the time or access to information to research themselves, then communicating an accurate and understandable version to the public as a teacher and policy advisor.

In his best-known books, Public Opinion (1922) and The Phantom Public (1925), Lippmann argued that most people lacked the capacity, time and motivation to follow and analyze news of the many complex policy questions that troubled society. Nor did they often experience most social problems or directly access expert insights. These limitations were made worse by a news media that tended to oversimplify issues and to reinforce stereotypes, partisan viewpoints and prejudices. As a consequence, Lippmann believed that the public needed journalists like himself who could serve as expert analysts, guiding "citizens to a deeper understanding of what was really important".

In 2018, the United States Department of Labor's Occupational Outlook Handbook reported that employment for the category "reporters, correspondents and broadcast news analysts" will decline 9 percent between 2016 and 2026.

== Modern overview ==
A worldwide sample of 27,500 journalists in 67 countries in 2012–2016 produced the following profile:

- 57 percent male;
- mean age of 38
- mean years of experience, 13
- college degree, 56 percent
- graduate degree, 29 percent
- 61 percent specialized in journalism/communications at college
- 62 percent identified as generalists
- 23 percent specialized as hard-news beat journalists
- 47 percent were members of a professional association
- 80 percent worked full-time
- 50 percent worked in print, 23 percent on television, 17 percent on radio and 16 percent online.

In 2019 the Reuters Institute for the Study of Journalism Digital News Report described the future for journalists in South Africa as "grim" because of low online revenue and plummeting advertising.

In 2020 Reporters Without Borders secretary general Christophe Deloire said journalists in developing countries were suffering political interference because the COVID-19 pandemic had given governments around the world the chance "to take advantage of the fact that politics are on hold, the public is stunned and protests are out of the question, in order to impose measures that would be impossible in normal times".

In 2023 the closure of local newspapers in the US accelerated to an average of 2.5 per week, leaving more than 200 US counties as "news deserts" and meaning that more than half of all U.S. counties had limited access to reliable local news and information, according to researchers at the Medill School of Journalism, Media, Integrated Marketing Communications at Northwestern University.

In January 2024, The Los Angeles Times, Time magazine and National Geographic all conducted layoffs, and Condé Nast journalists went on strike over proposed job cuts. The Los Angeles Times laid off more than 20% of the newsroom. CNN, Sports Illustrated and NBC News shed employees in early 2024. The New York Times reported that Americans were suffering from "news fatigue" due to coverage of major news stories like the Hamas attack, Russian invasion of Ukraine and the presidential election. American consumers turned away from journalists at legacy organizations as social media became a common news source.

== Freedom ==
Journalists sometimes expose themselves to danger, particularly when reporting in areas of armed conflict or in states that do not respect the freedom of the press. Organizations such as the Committee to Protect Journalists and Reporters Without Borders publish reports on press freedom and advocate for journalistic freedom. As of December 2024, the committee to Protect Journalists reports that 2253 journalists have been killed worldwide since 1992, either by murder (71%), crossfire or combat (17%), or on dangerous assignments (11%). The "Ten deadliest countries" for journalists since 1992 have been Iraq (227 deaths), Philippines (157), Mexico (153), Israel (143), Pakistan (96), Colombia (95), India (89), Russia (84), Somalia (81), Brazil (60), and Algeria (60).

The committee to Protect Journalists also reports that as on 1 December 2010, 145 journalists were jailed worldwide for journalistic activities. Current numbers are even higher. The ten countries with the largest number of currently-imprisoned journalists are Turkey (95), China (34), Iran (34), Eritrea (17), Burma (13), Uzbekistan (6), Vietnam (5), Cuba (4), Ethiopia (4) and Sudan (3).

Apart from physical harm, journalists are harmed psychologically. This applies especially to war reporters, but their editorial offices at home often do not know how to deal appropriately with the reporters they expose to danger. Hence, a systematic and sustainable way of psychological support for traumatized journalists is strongly needed. Few and fragmented support programs exist so far.

On 8 August 2023, Iran's Journalists' Day, Tehran Journalists' Association head Akbar Montajabi noted over 100 journalists arrested amid protests, while HamMihan newspaper exposed repression against 76 media workers since September 2022 following Mahsa Amini's death-triggered mass protests, leading to legal consequences for journalists including Niloufar Hamedi and Elaheh.

== Relationship with sources ==
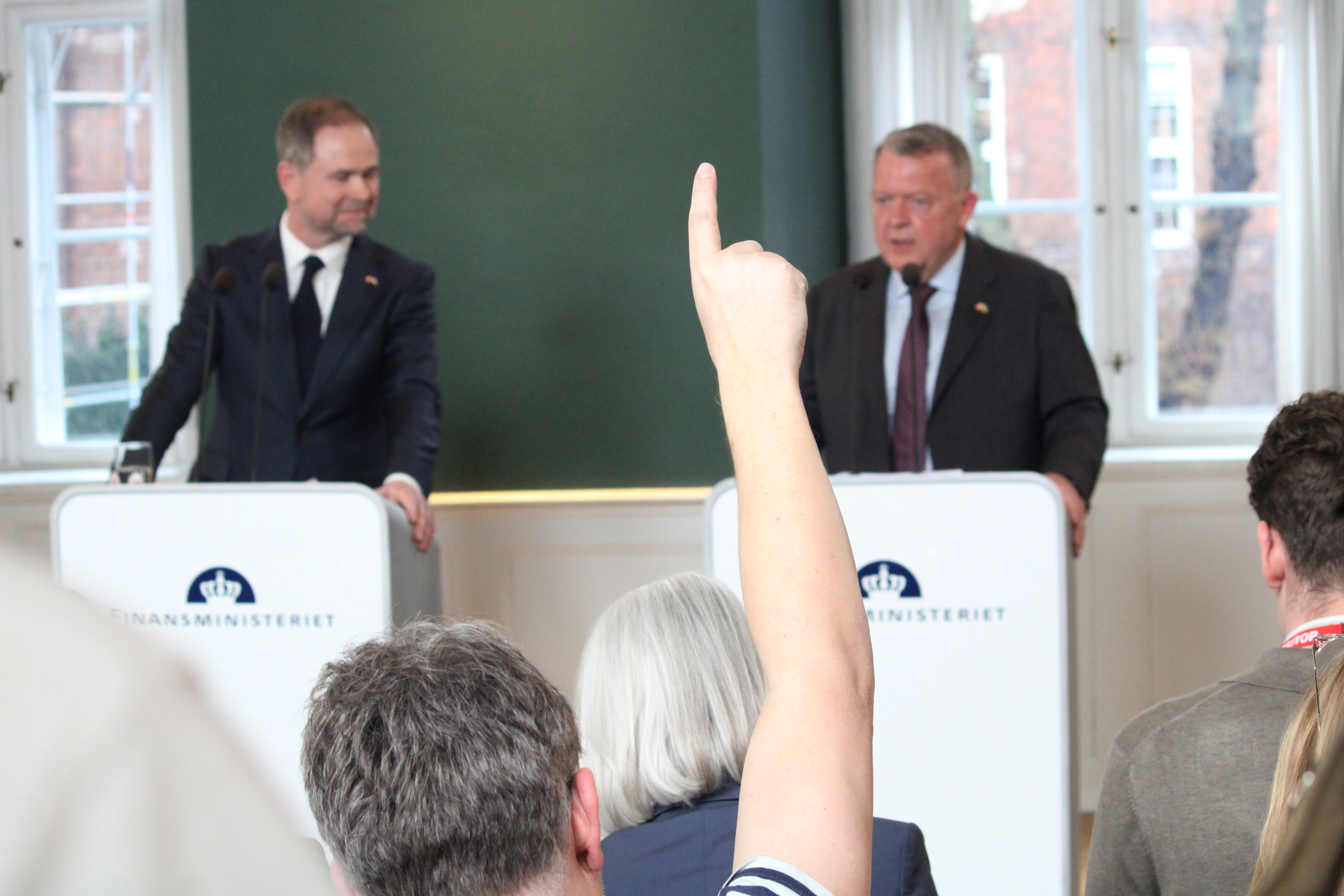
A journalist wanting to ask a question at a press conference

The relationship between a professional journalist and a source can be rather complex, and a source can sometimes have an effect on an article written by the journalist. The article 'A Compromised Fourth Estate' uses Herbert Gans' metaphor to capture their relationship. He uses a dance metaphor, "The Tango", to illustrate the co-operative nature of their interactions inasmuch as "It takes two to tango". Herbert suggests that the source often leads, but journalists commonly object to this notion for two reasons:

1. It signals source supremacy in news making.
2. It offends journalists' professional culture, which emphasizes independence and editorial autonomy.

The dance metaphor goes on to state:

A relationship with sources that is too cozy is potentially compromising of journalists' integrity and risks becoming collusive. Journalists have typically favored a more robust, conflict model, based on a crucial assumption that if the media are to function as watchdogs of powerful economic and political interests, journalists must establish their independence of sources or risk the fourth estate being driven by the fifth estate of public relations.

== Safety ==
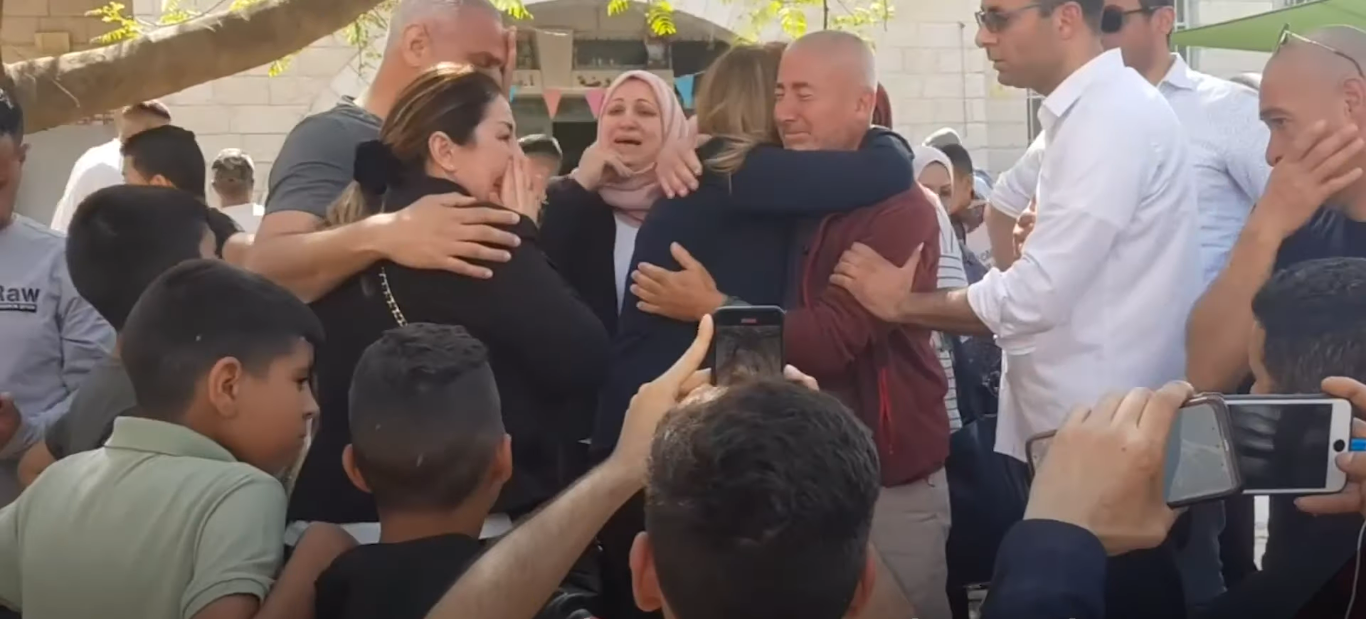
Funeral for Palestinian journalist Shireen Abu Aqleh after her death

Journalists can face violence and intimidation for exercising their fundamental right to freedom of expression. The range of threats they are confronted with include murder, kidnapping, hostage-taking, offline and online harassment, intimidation, enforced disappearances, arbitrary detention and torture. Women in journalism also face specific dangers and are especially vulnerable to sexual assault, whether in the form of a targeted sexual violation, often in reprisal for their work. Mob-related sexual violence aimed against journalists covering public events; or the sexual abuse of journalists in detention or captivity. Many of these crimes are not reported as a result of powerful cultural and professional stigmas.

Increasingly, journalists (particularly women) are abused and harassed online, via hate speech, cyber-bullying, cyber-stalking, doxing, trolling, public shaming, intimidation and threats.

=== Most dangerous year ===
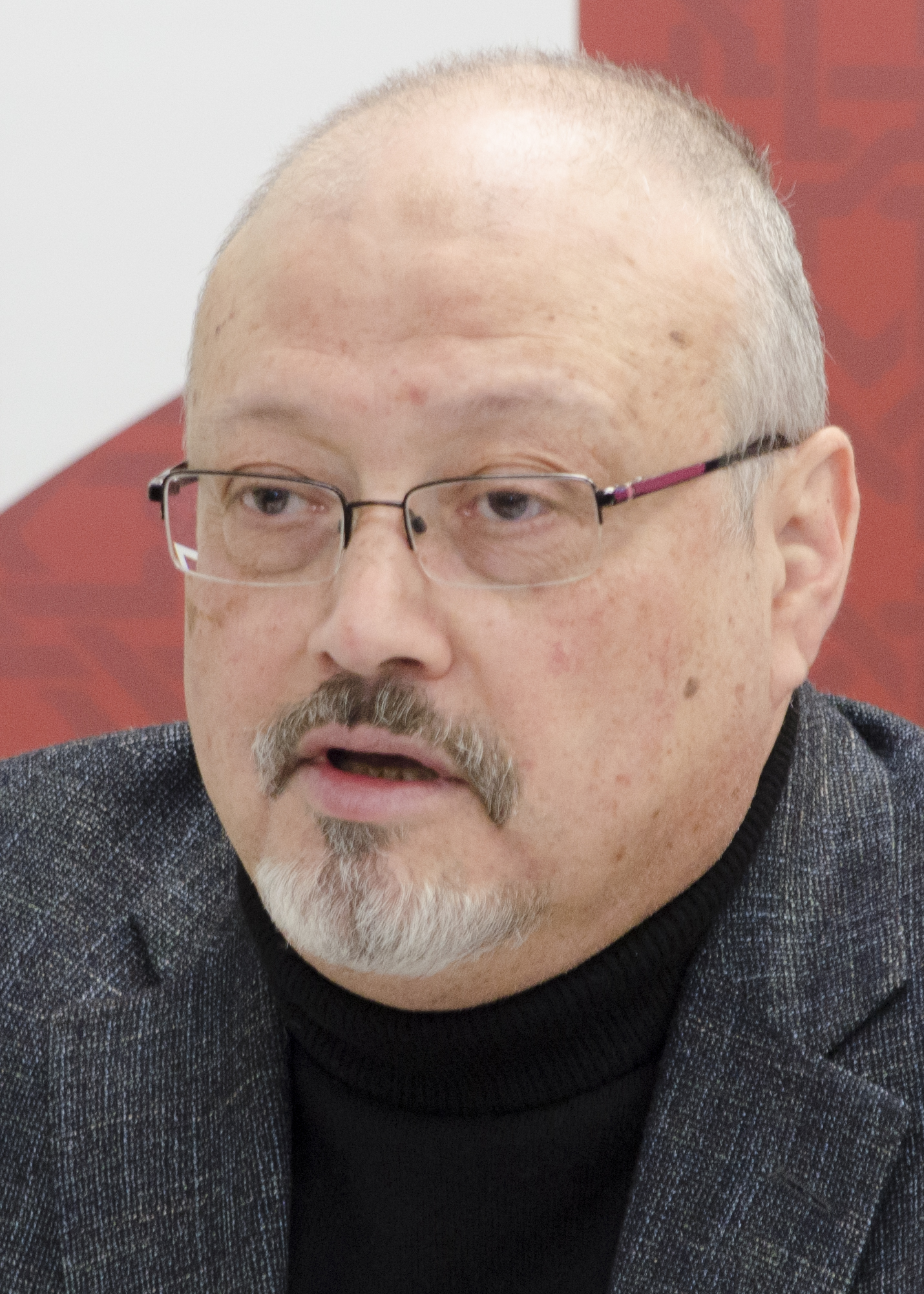
Jamal Khashoggi, killed inside Saudi Arabia's consulate in Istanbul on 2 October 2018

According to Reporters Without Borders' 2018 annual report, it was the worst year on record for deadly violence and abuse toward journalists; there was a 15 percent increase in such killings since 2017, with 80 killed, 348 imprisoned and 60 held hostage.

Yaser Murtaja was shot by an Israeli army sniper. Rubén Pat was gunned down outside a beach bar in Mexico. Mexico was described by Reporters Without Borders as "one of world's deadliest countries for the media"; 90% of attacks on journalists in the country reportedly go unsolved. Bulgarian Victoria Marinova was beaten, raped and strangled. Saudi Arabian dissident Jamal Khashoggi was killed inside Saudi Arabia's consulate in Istanbul.

=== Commemoration ===
From 2008 to 2019, Freedom Forum's now-defunct Newseum in Washington, D.C. featured a Journalists Memorial which honored several thousand journalists around the world who had died or were killed while reporting the news. After the Newseum closed in December 2019, supporters of freedom of the press persuaded the United States Congress in December 2020 to authorize the construction of a memorial to fallen journalists on public land with private funds. By May 2023, the Fallen Journalists Memorial Foundation had begun the design of the memorial.

== Education ==
In the US, nearly all journalists have attended university, but only about half majored in journalism. Journalists who work in television or for newspapers are more likely to have studied journalism in college than journalists working for the wire services, in radio, or for news magazines.

== Gallery ==
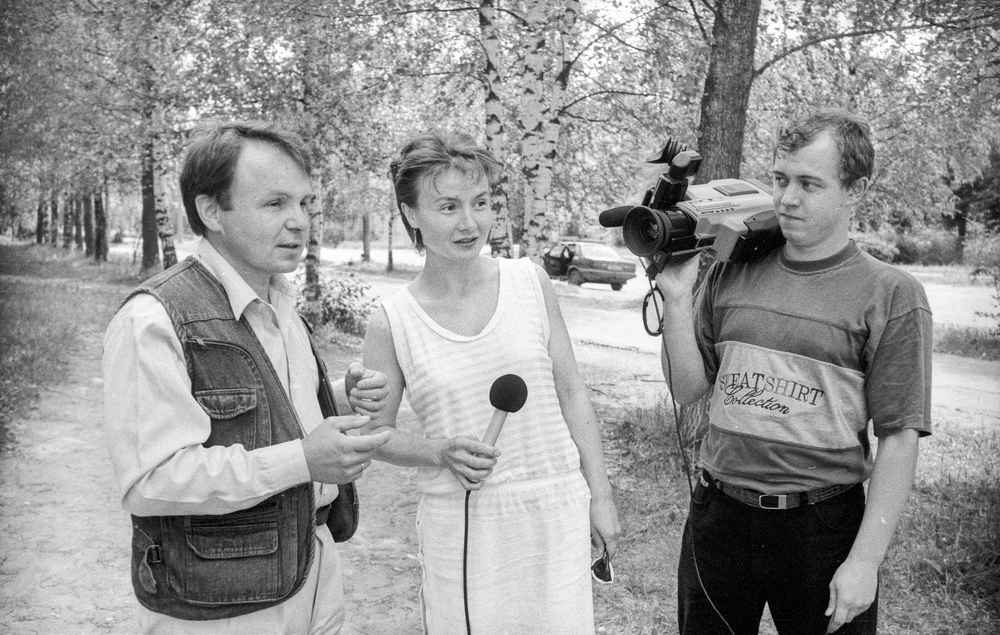
A program director sets the task for TV journalists, 1998.

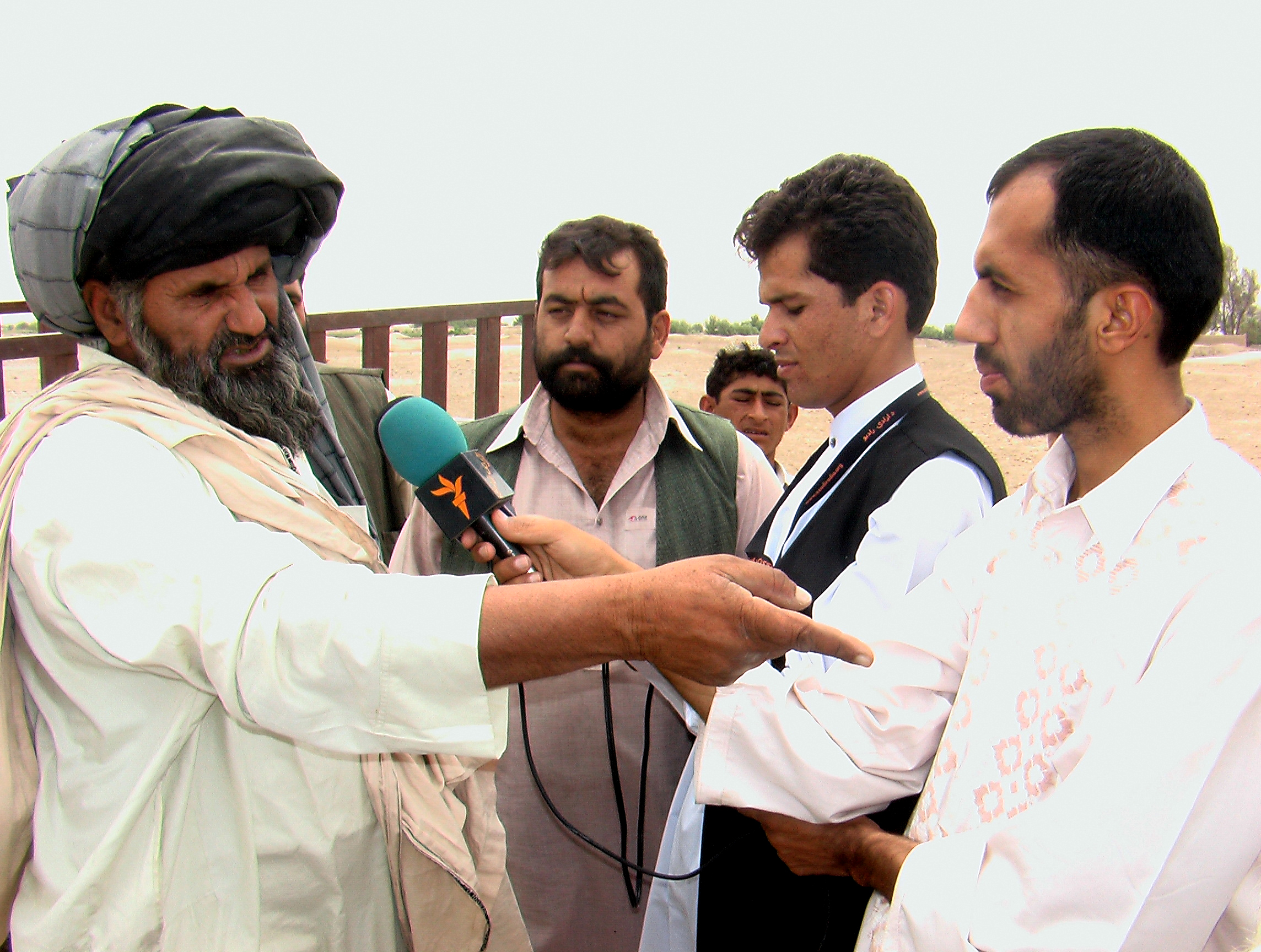
A reporter interviews a man in Helmand Province, Afghanistan, 2009.

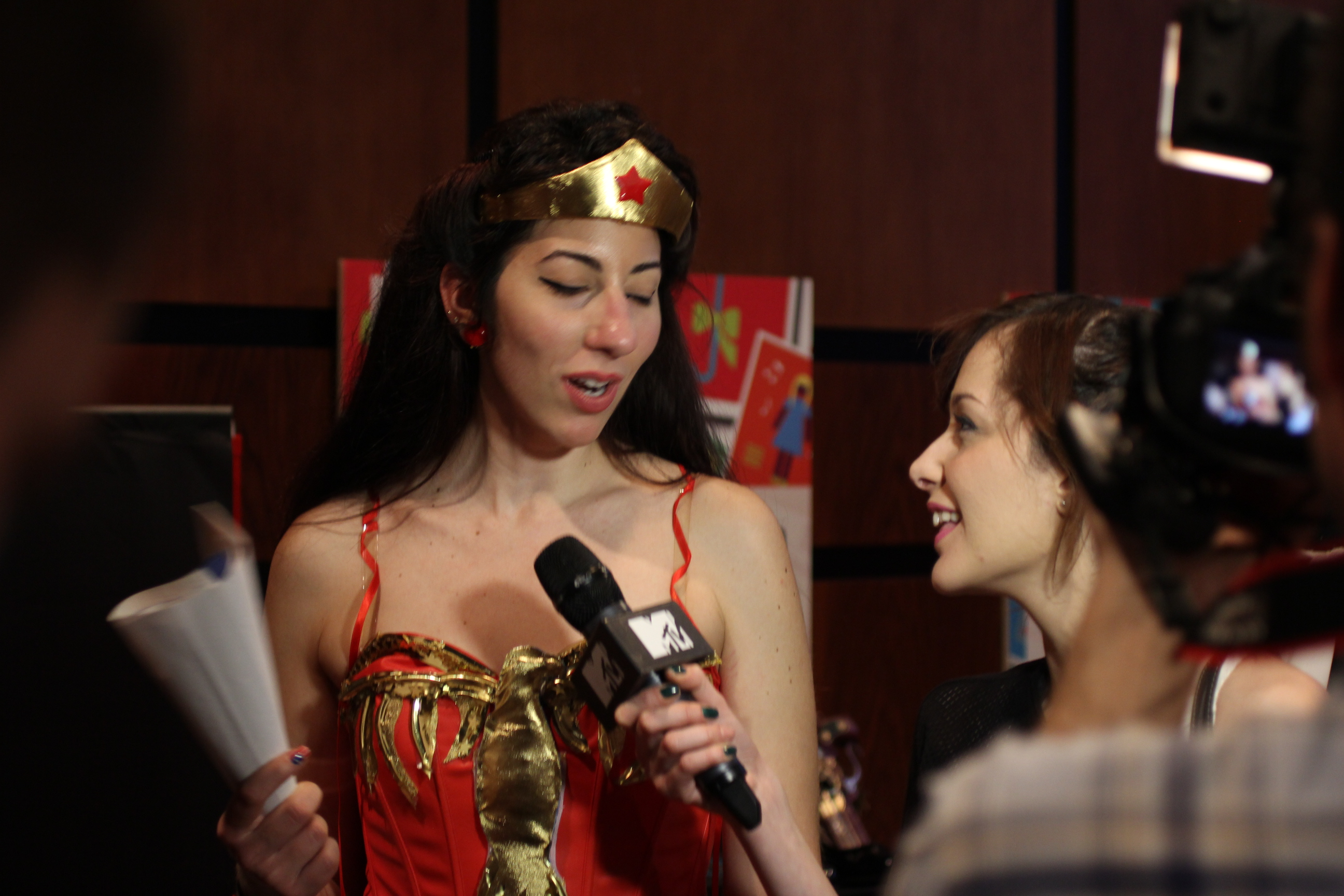
Journalist interviews a cosplayer, 2012.

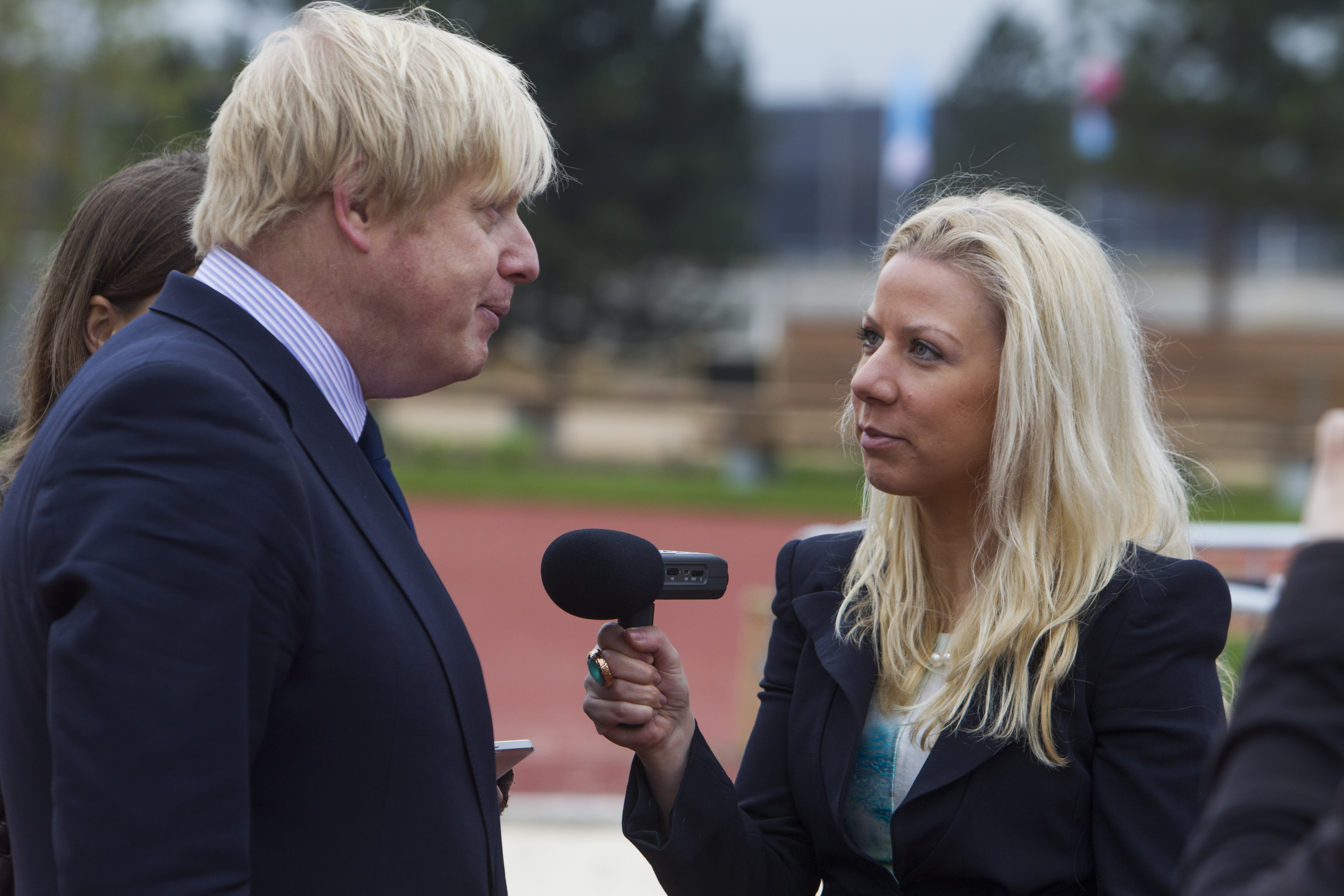
A reporter interviewing Boris Johnson when he was Mayor of London, 2014

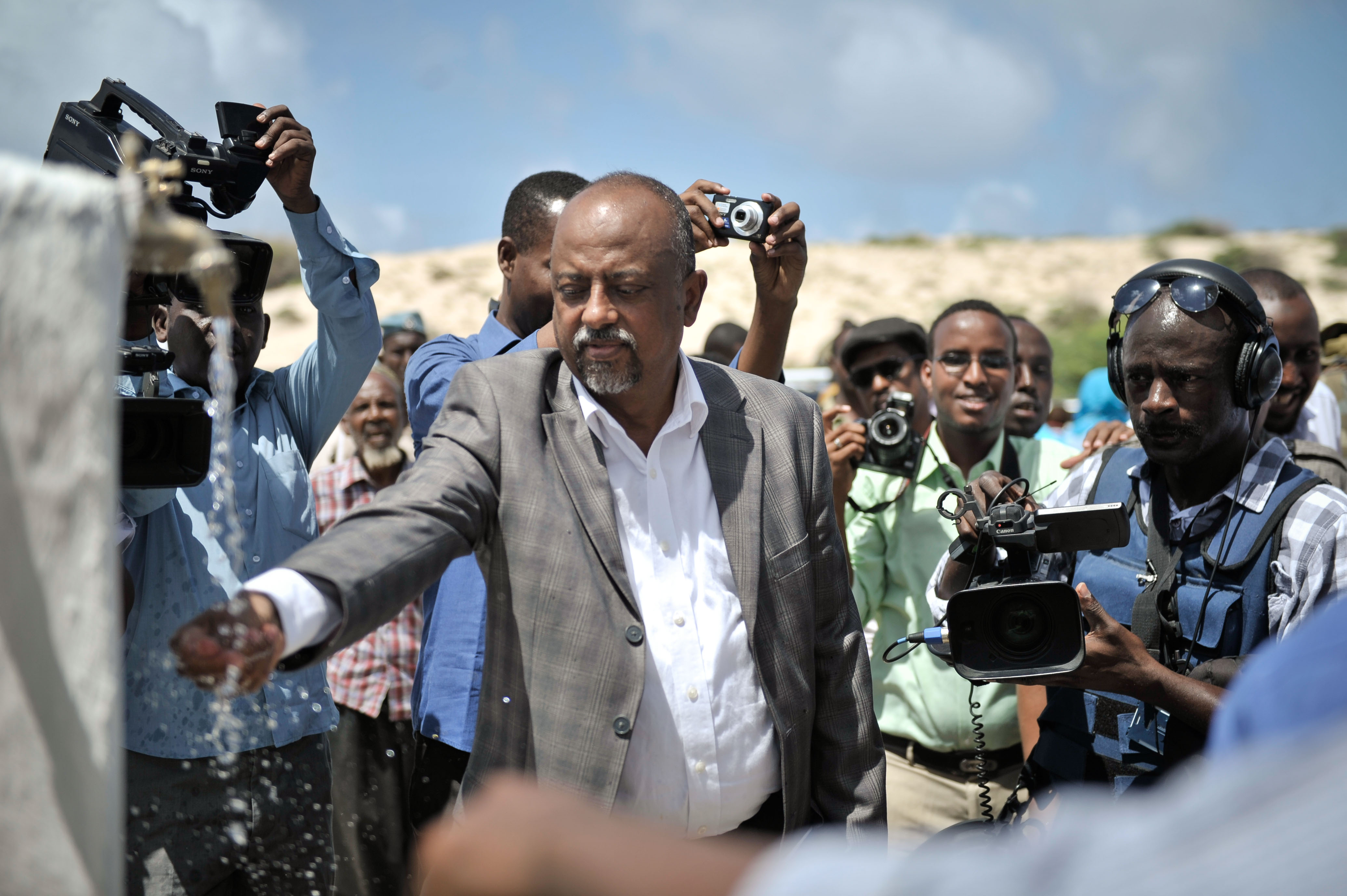
Official tastes the water of a new well in front of journalists in Mogadishu, Somalia, 2014.

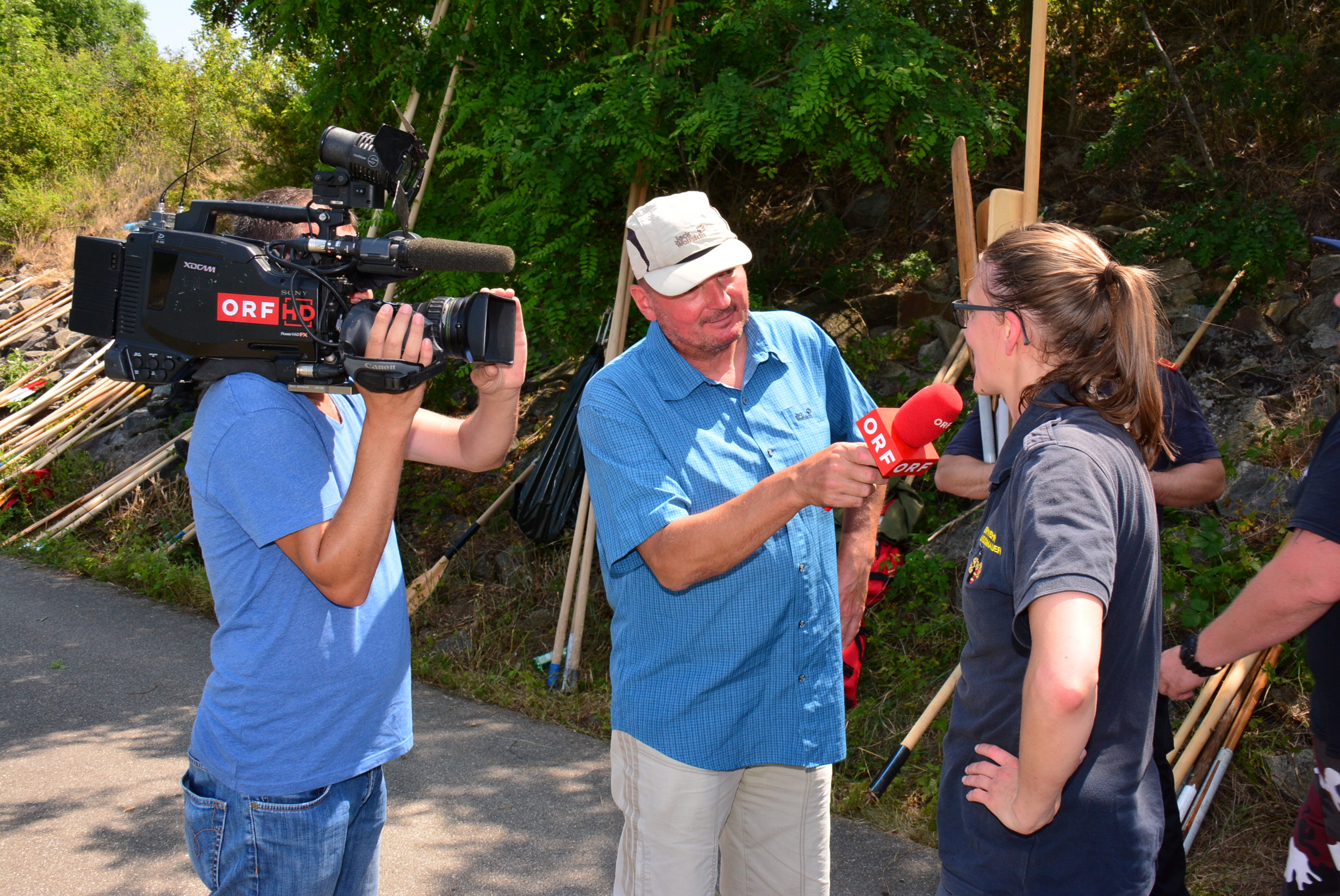
Cameraman and journalist who interviews a person in Austria

== See also ==
- 24-hour news cycle
- Broadcast journalism
- Electronic field production (EFP)
- Electronic news-gathering (ENG)
- Glossary of journalism
- List of ITV journalists and newsreaders
- List of journalists
- Local news
- News broadcasting
- News presenter
- Newsroom
- Outside broadcasting
- Student newspaper
- War correspondent

== Bibliography ==
- Deuze, Mark. "What is journalism? Professional identity and ideology of journalists reconsidered." Journalism 6.4 (2005): 442–464 online.
- Hanitzsch, Thomas, et al. eds. Worlds of Journalism: Journalistic Cultures around the Globe (1979) excerpt of the book also online review
- Hicks, Wynford, et al. Writing for journalists (Routledge, 2016) short textbook; excerpt.
- Keeble, Richard. Ethics for journalists (Routledge, 2008).
- Mellado, Claudia, et al. "Investigating the gap between newspaper journalists' role conceptions and role performance in nine European, Asian, and Latin American countries." International Journal of Press/Politics (2020): 1940161220910106 online.
- Patterson, Thomas E., and Wolfgang Donsbagh. "News decisions: Journalists as partisan actors." Political communication 13.4 (1996): 455–468. online
- Randall, David. The Universal Journalist. (Pluto Press, 2000). ISBN 978-0-7453-1641-3; OCLC 43481682
- Shoemaker, Pamela J., Tim P. Vos, and Stephen D. Reese. "Journalists as gatekeepers." in The handbook of journalism studies 73 (2009) online.
- Stone, Melville Elijah. Fifty Years a Journalist. New York: Doubleday, Page and Company (1921). OCLC 1520155
- Wettstein, Martin, et al. "News media as gatekeepers, critics, and initiators of populist communication: How journalists in ten countries deal with the populist challenge." International Journal of Press/Politics 23.4 (2018): 476-495 online.
