= Ellen Lovell House =

Historic house in Minnesota, United States

- U.S. National Register of Historic Places
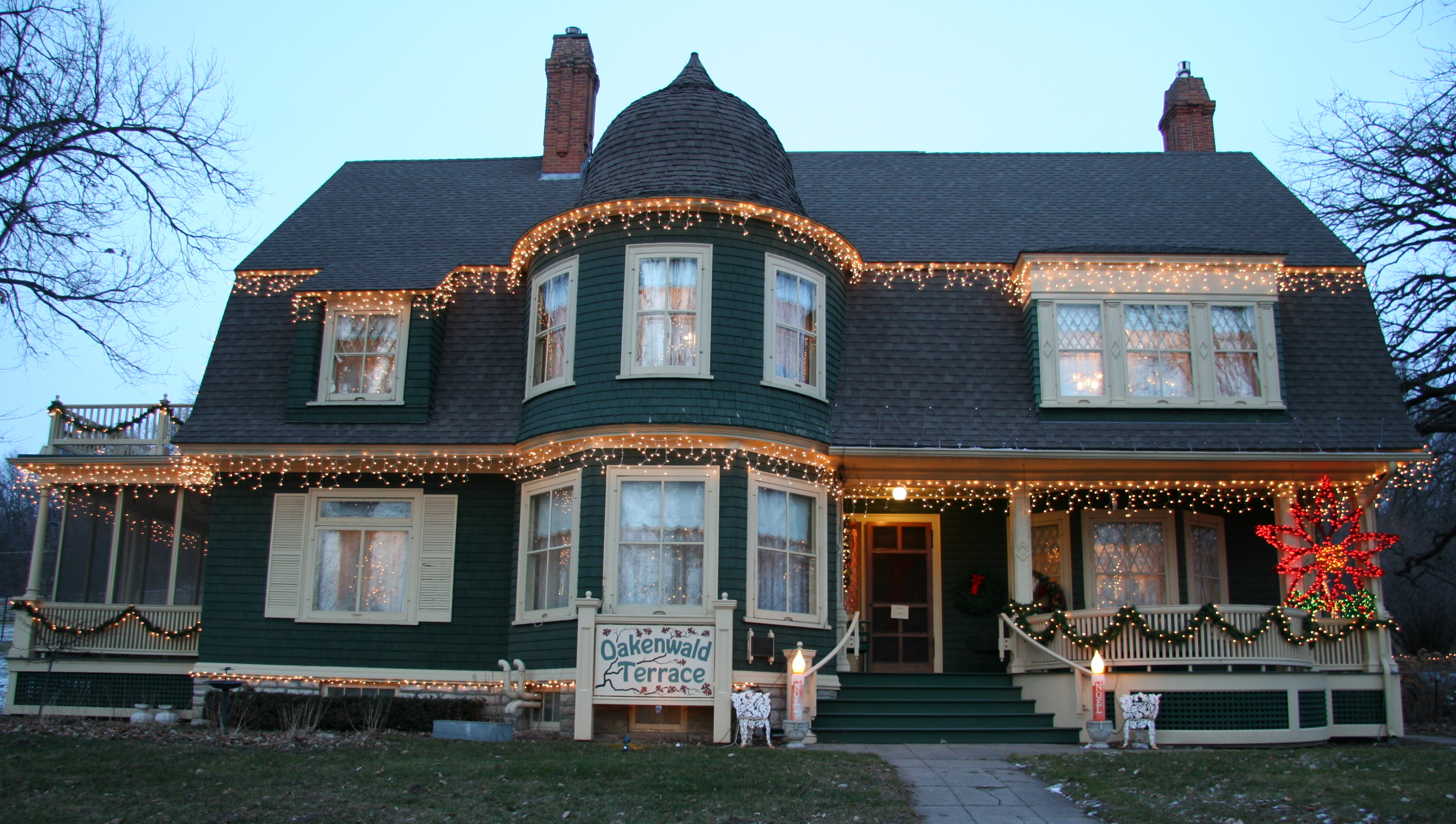
- The house lit with Christmas decorations

- Location within Minnesota Location within the United States
- Location: 218 Winona Street; Chatfield, Minnesota
- Coordinates: 43°50′48″N 92°11′9″W
- Area: Less than one acre
- Built: 1896
- Architect: John Kingsley
- Architectural style: Shingle Style
- MPS: Fillmore County MRA
- NRHP reference No.: 82001893
- Added to NRHP: November 19, 1982

The Ellen M. Lovell House, also called Oakenwald Terrace, is a bed and breakfast in Chatfield, Minnesota, United States. The L-shaped Shingle Style structure was built in 1896. It is next door to the George Haven House, both properties were originally part of the estate of prominent Chatfield financier Jason C. Easton. listed on the National Register of Historic Places in 1982.

Oakenwald Terrace was the name given to her house when in 1897 Ellen Lovell built the house of her dreams. Mrs. Lovell was the original owner and the primary occupant for over 20 years. Her son Frink was 15 years old in 1897 when the family moved in, but a few years later he was off building a life of his own. Daughter Anna was married in the house in February 1897, the day after the family moved in, but although mother Ellen had a room in the house specifically for her daughter and son in law, the couple never lived there. The house was built after Ellen's husband Charles had died.

When converting the house to a bed and breakfast, the Lund family that has owned the home since 1973 had no trouble deciding on a name for their property. Since it had been named while on the architects drawing board, there was no reason to use any name other than Oakenwald Terrace. The 10,000+ square foot home is decorated with furniture and accessories from the turn of the century, including some of the original items from the home. The owners love to share the history with guests. Guests to the house often describe it as museum quality, but it is friendly and comfortable in addition to being a bit of living history.
