= George Haven House =

Historic house in Minnesota, United States

- George H. Haven House
- U.S. National Register of Historic Places
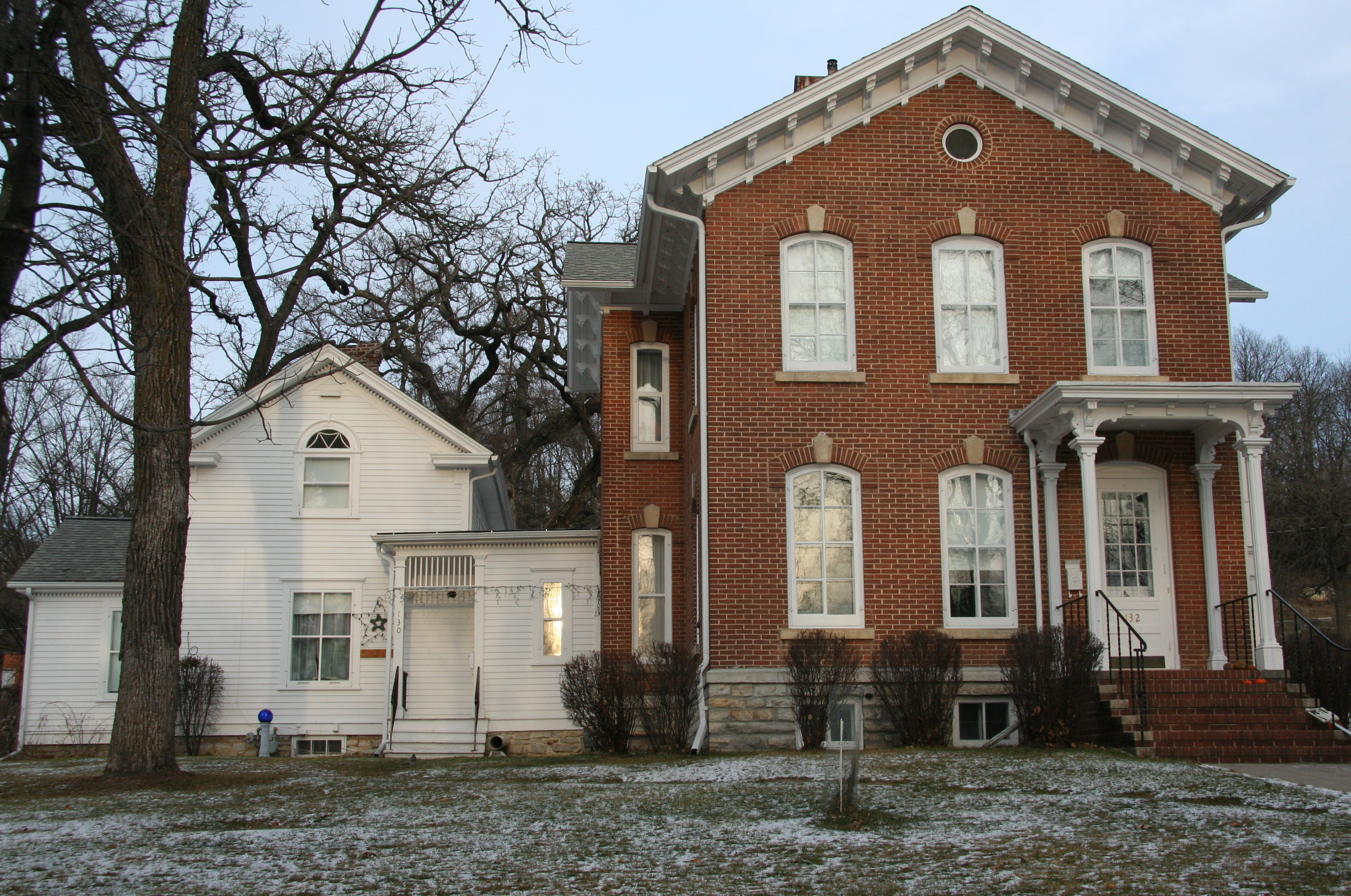
- The cottage (left) and The Oaks (right)

- Location within Minnesota
- Location: 132 Winona Street; Chatfield, Minnesota
- Coordinates: 43°50′49″N 92°11′11″W
- Area: approximately 2 acres (0.81 ha)
- Built: 1874
- Architect: Maybury & Son
- Architectural style: Greek Revival; Italianate
- MPS: Fillmore County MRA
- NRHP reference No.: 82000559
- Added to NRHP: November 19, 1982

The George Haven House, also known as The Oaks, is a historic building located in Chatfield, Minnesota, United States. The Italianate house was built in 1874, and the Greek Revival cottage, also known as the Lucian Johnson House, was completed in 1892. It is next door to Oakenwald Terrace. At one time what is now three properties were on the same estate of Jason C. Easton. They are representative of the commercial and financial prosperity of Chatfield. The Hanson and Johnson houses were listed together on the National Register of Historic Places in 1982.
