= Josef Fahrenholtz =

American basketball player

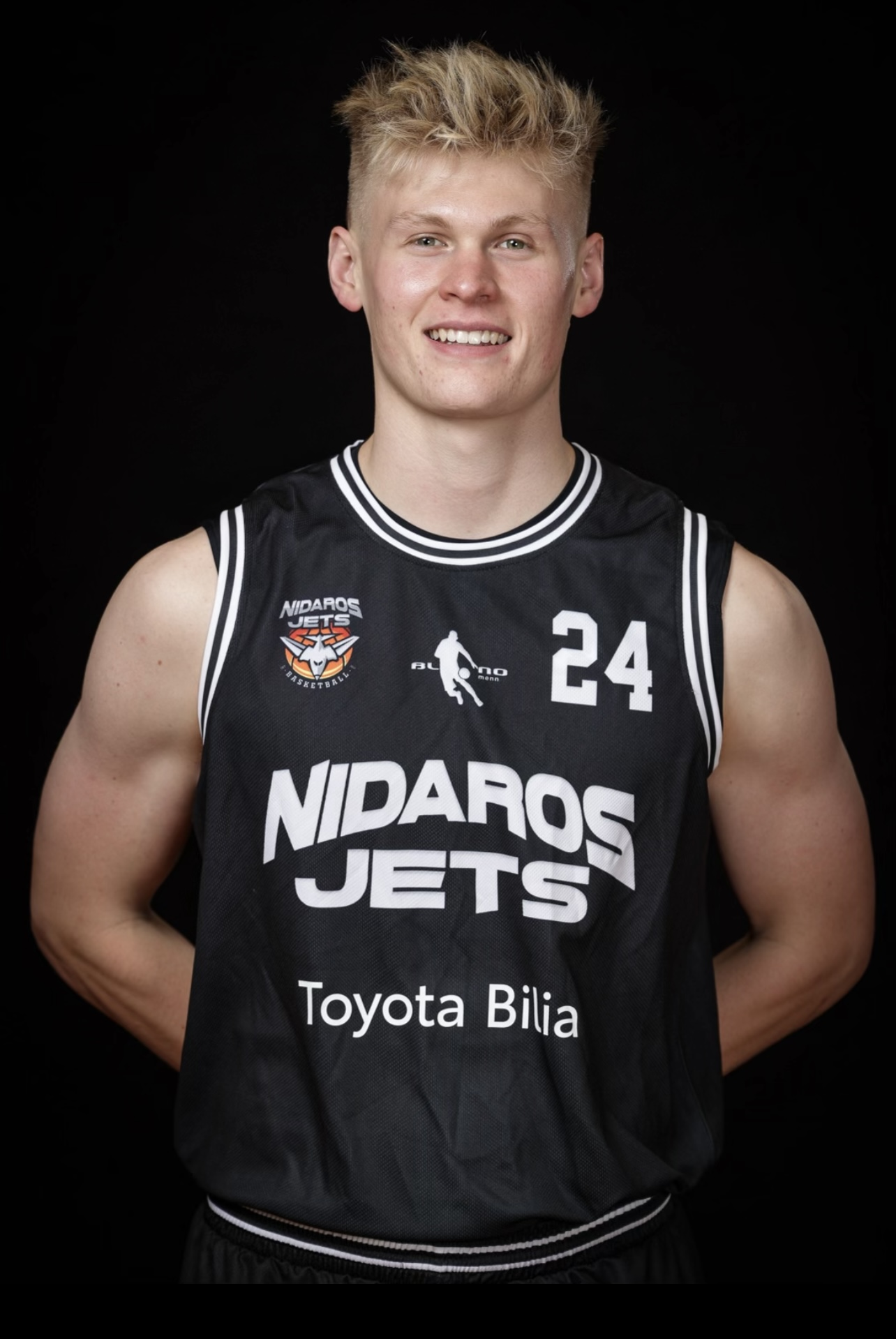

No. 24 – Nidaros Jets
- Position: Forward
- League: Basketligaen Norge

Personal information
- Born: February 1, 2001 (age 25) Chatfield, Minnesota, U.S.
- Listed height: 6 ft 8 in (2.03 m)
- Listed weight: 230 lb (104 kg)

Career information
- High school: Chatfield (Chatfield, Minnesota)
- College: Wisconsin–Superior (2019–2024)
- NBA draft: 2023: undrafted
- Playing career: 2024–present

Career history
- 2024–2025: Nidaros Jets

Josef Fahrenholtz (born February 1, 2001) is an American professional basketball player for Nidaros Jets of the Basketligaen Norge, the first-tier level of professional basketball league in Norway. Standing at 2.03 metres (6 ft 8 in), he plays at the forward position.

== High School ==
A graduate of Chatfield High School in 2019, he averaged 14.4 points and 8.7 rebounds per game, shooting 54.8 percent from the field, for the Gophers in 2018–19. Josef was named All-Three Rivers Conference First Team as a senior.

== College career ==
Josef decided to major in Exercise Science with a Community Health concentration at UW-Superior while starting his college basketball career in the NCAA Division III where he played four seasons and he averaged 10.6 points and 5.4 rebounds per game.

== Professional career ==
After going undrafted in the 2023 NBA draft, Fahrenholtz joined the roster of the Nidaros Jets is a Norwegian professional basketball club based in Trondheim. The club competes in the Basketligaen Norge, better known as BLNO, a professional men's basketball league in Norway.
