= Chatfield High School (Minnesota) =

Coordinates: 43.8547222°N 92.1902778°W

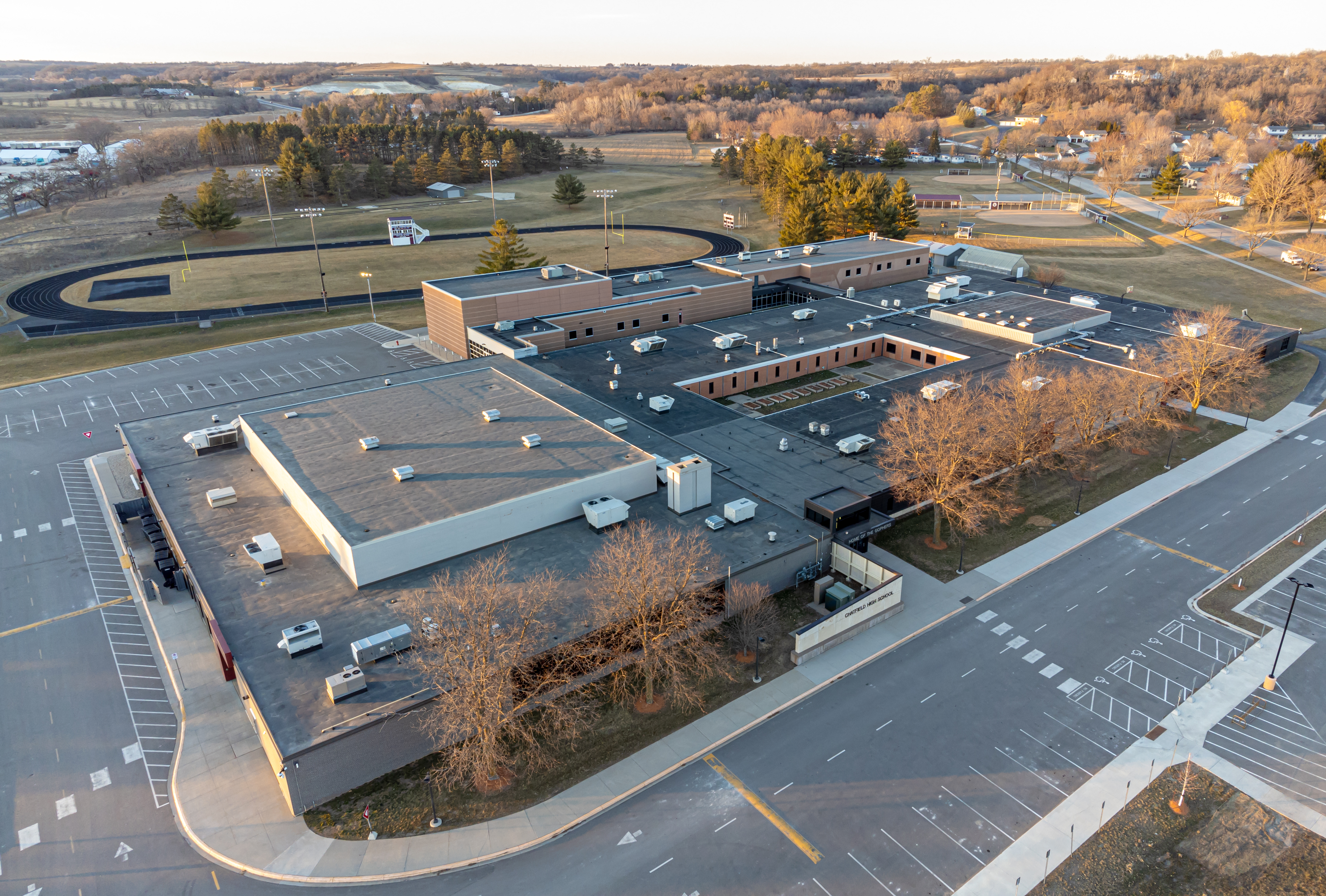
- 205 Union Street NE; Chatfield, Minnesota; United States

Information
- Staff: 26.56 (FTE)
- Grades: 7–12
- Enrollment: 437 (2023-2024)
- Student to teacher ratio: 16.45
- Color
- Team name: Gophers
- Website: www.chatfieldschools.com/7-12

Chatfield High School is a public high school located in southeastern Minnesota approximately ten miles south of Rochester, Minnesota in the town of Chatfield, United States. Located in Olmsted County, the school has approximately 350–400 students enrolled full-time. It can also be identified as Chosen Valley High School.

Chatfield High School averages about 60 students per graduating class.

Chatfield's mascot is the golden gophers. The colors of the school are maroon, gold and white.

Chatfield has an extensive amount of sports offered. For example, football, basketball, baseball, and more.

== Notable alumni ==
- Josef Fahrenholtz, professional basketball player
