= Spring Valley Methodist Episcopal Church =

Historic church in Minnesota, United States

- U.S. National Register of Historic Places
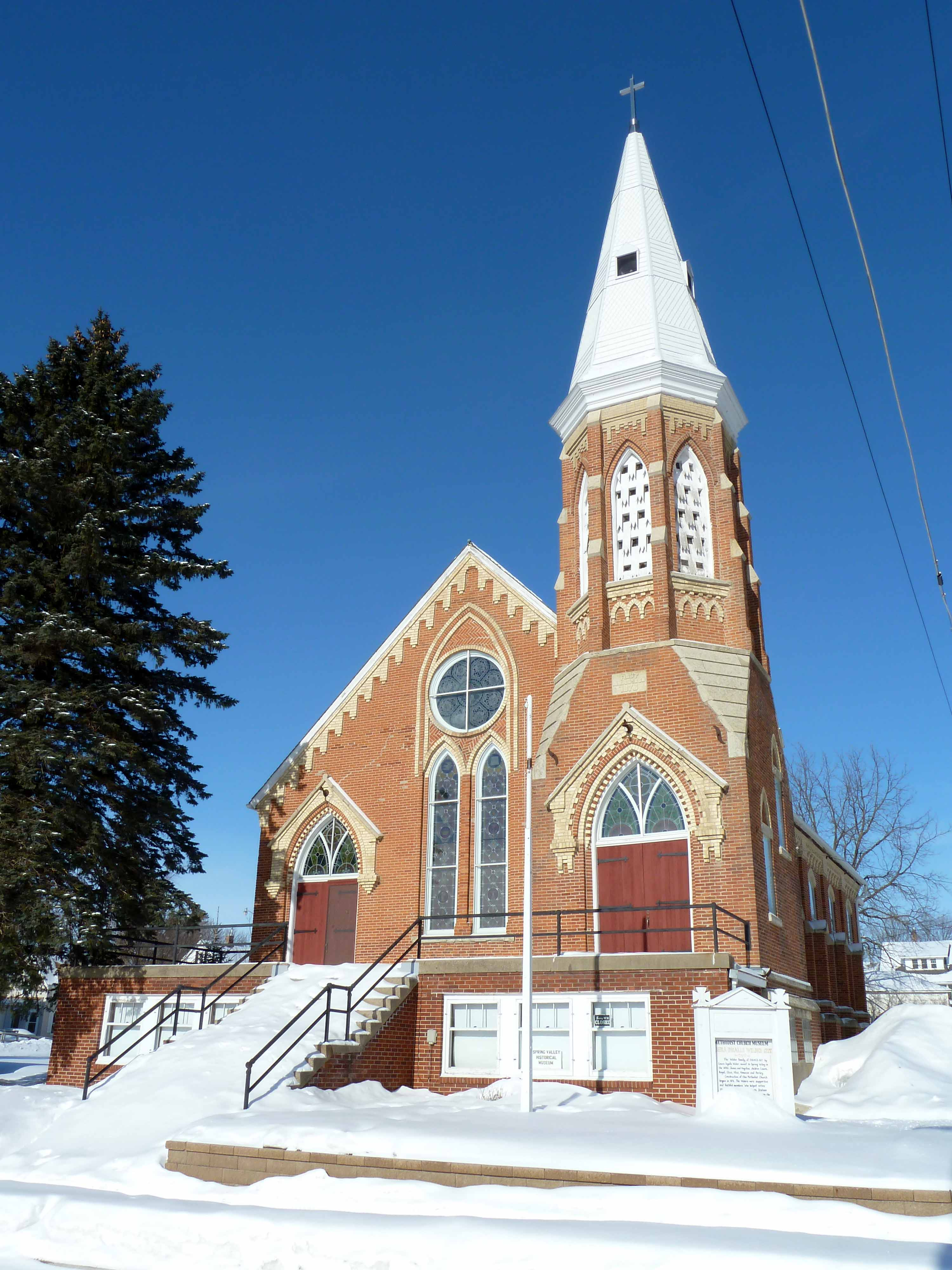

- Location within Minnesota Location within the United States
- Location: 221 W. Courtland St., Spring Valley, Minnesota
- Coordinates: 43°41′17″N 92°23′35″W
- Area: less than one acre
- Built: 1876
- Architectural style: Gothic
- NRHP reference No.: 75000979
- Added to NRHP: May 12, 1975

Spring Valley Methodist Episcopal Church (also known as the First Methodist Church and Spring Valley Community Historical Society Museum) is a historic church building at 221 W. Courtland Street in Spring Valley, Minnesota.

It was built in 1876 and was added to the National Register of Historic Places in 1975. This ornate 1876 Gothic Revival church is now a Spring Valley Community Historical Society museum.
