= Peter Fahrenholtz =

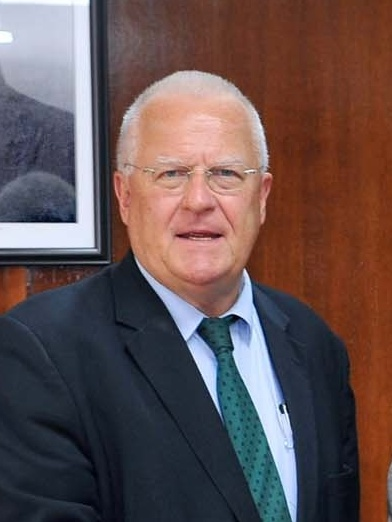
- Fahrenholtz in 2019
- Born: Hamburg, Germany
- Occupation: Diplomat

Peter Fahrenholtz (born Hamburg, Germany) is a German diplomat, posted since 2018 as the Ambassador in Bangladesh.

Fahrenholtz graduated from the German School in Washington, D.C., and continued to study Economics and Japanology between 1976 and 1982 at the Georg-August University in Göttingen, Germany. From 1982 until 1984, he stayed in Japan with a research scholarship from the Japanese government.

After being employed by Deutsche Bank from 1984 to 1986, Fahrenholtz joined the German Foreign Office in 1986. After graduating from the Foreign Service Academy, he was posted from 1988 to 1991 to the German Embassy in Bucharest, Romania, and the Consulate General in Osaka, Japan, from 1991 to 1995. Returning to Germany, Fahrenholtz served in the department for economic affairs of the Foreign Office dealing mainly with international strategy issues on raw materials . From 1997 to 2001 he was posted to Tehran, Iran, as head of the consular and legal department of the German embassy.

From 2001 to 2004, Fahrenholtz was the deputy head of the Crisis Response Centre in the German Foreign office, which was followed by a posting as acting Consul General in Mumbai, India, until 2006. After serving as deputy head of mission at the German embassy in Addis Ababa, Ethiopia, until 2009, Fahrenholtz was named head of division in the Foreign Office for West and Central Africa. From 14 September 2012 until August 2016, Fahrenholtz was the German Ambassador in Rwanda. From September 2016 until July 2018 he was posted as Consul General in Toronto, Canada. Since August 2018 Fahrenholtz is the German ambassador to Bangladesh.

In 2001, Fahrenholtz was awarded the order of merit by the German president. He has been married since 1986 to Kirsten Fahrenholtz, and has five children.
