= Harmony Township, Fillmore County, Minnesota =

Harmony Township, Minnesota
- Township
- Location within the state of Minnesota Harmony Township, Minnesota (the United States)
- Coordinates: 43°33′4″N 92°1′42″W
- Country: United States
- State: Minnesota
- County: Fillmore

Area
  - Total: 34.7 sq mi (90.0 km^{2})
  - Land: 34.7 sq mi (90.0 km^{2})
  - Water: 0 sq mi (0.0 km^{2})
- Elevation: 1,350 ft (410 m)

Population (2000)
  - Total: 396
  - Density: 11/sq mi (4.4/km^{2})
- Time zone: UTC-6 (Central (CST))
  - Summer (DST): UTC-5 (CDT)
- ZIP code: 55939
- Area code: 507
- FIPS code: 27-27206
- GNIS feature ID: 0664399

Harmony Township is a township in Fillmore County, Minnesota, United States. The population was 396 at the 2000 census.

== History ==
Harmony Township was organized in 1858.

== Geography ==
According to the United States Census Bureau, the township has a total area of 34.8 square miles (90 km^{2}), all land.

== Demographics ==
As of the census of 2000, there were 396 people, 125 households, and 108 families residing in the township. The population density was 11.4 inhabitants per square mile (4.4/km^{2}). There were 136 housing units at an average density of 3.9 per square mile (1.5/km^{2}). The racial makeup of the township was 100.00% White.

There were 125 households, out of which 36.0% had children under the age of 18 living with them, 83.2% were married couples living together, 2.4% had a female householder with no husband present, and 12.8% were non-families. 11.2% of all households were made up of individuals, and 4.8% had someone living alone who was 65 years of age or older. The average household size was 3.17 and the average family size was 3.45.

The population was 31.6% under the age of 18, 8.6% from 18 to 24, 25.0% from 25 to 44, 21.7% from 45 to 64, and 13.1% who were 65 years of age or older. The median age was 36 years. For every 100 females, there were 114.1 males. For every 100 females age 18 and over, there were 111.7 males.

The median income for a household in the township was $42,083, and the median income for a family was $41,875. Males had a median income of $26,875 versus $21,406 for females. The per capita income for the township was $14,531. About 9.4% of families and 14.1% of the population were below the poverty line, including 18.1% of those under age 18 and none of those age 65 or over.
