= Chatfield, Minnesota =

City in Minnesota, United States

Chatfield
- City
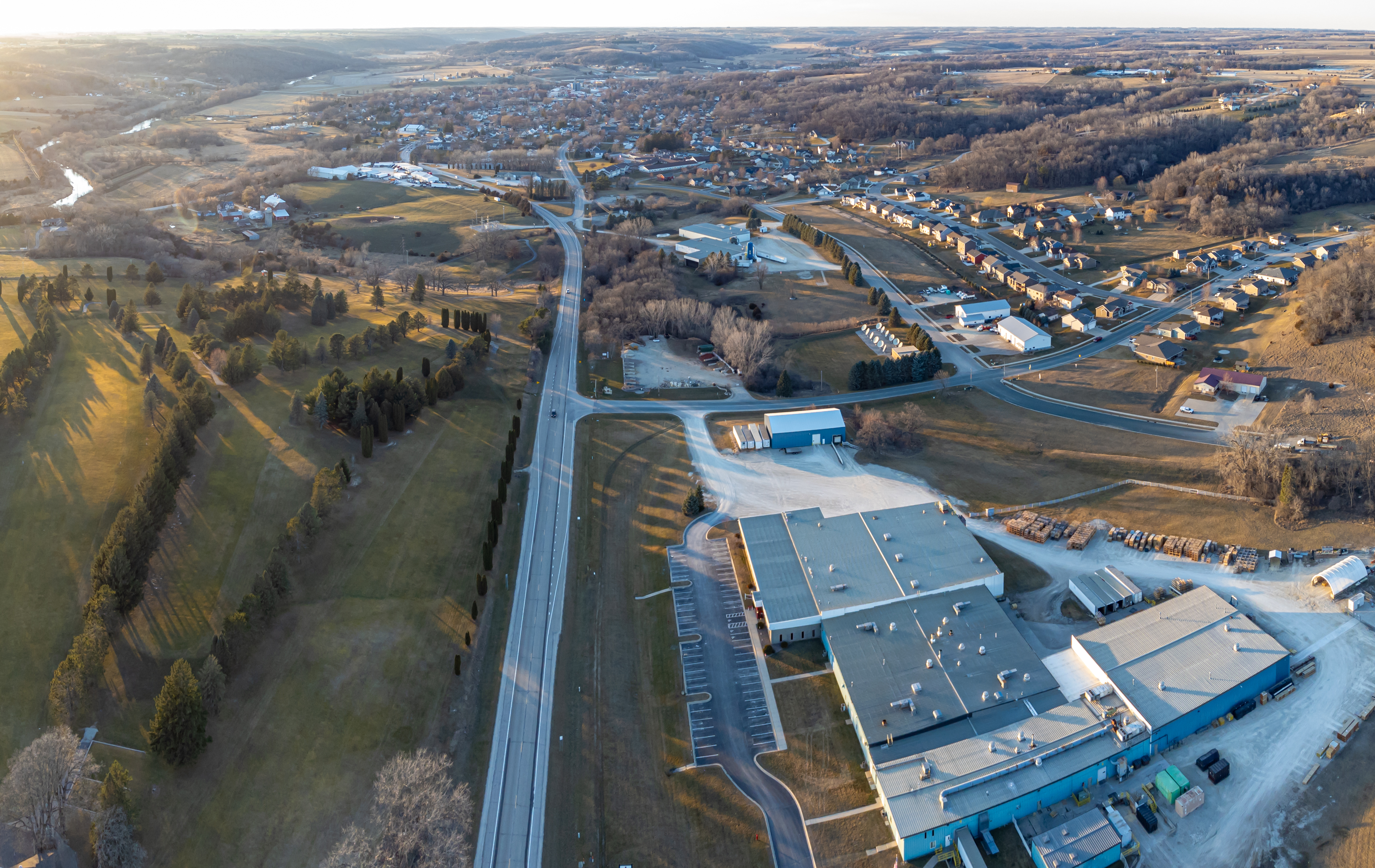
- US-52 runs through town
- Motto(s): "The Gateway to Bluff Country" and "The Chosen Valley"
- Location of Chatfield, Minnesota (Olmsted County)

- Location of Chatfield, Minnesota (Fillmore County)
- Coordinates: 43°50′40″N 92°10′58″W
- Country: United States
- State: Minnesota
- Counties: Fillmore, Olmsted

Area
  - Total: 2.59 sq mi (6.71 km^{2})
  - Land: 2.59 sq mi (6.71 km^{2})
  - Water: 0 sq mi (0.00 km^{2})
- Elevation: 1,034 ft (315 m)

Population (2020)
  - Total: 2,997
  - Density: 1,157.4/sq mi (446.89/km^{2})
- Time zone: UTC-6 (Central (CST))
  - Summer (DST): UTC-5 (CDT)
- ZIP code: 55923
- Area code: 507
- FIPS code: 27-11008
- GNIS feature ID: 2393810
- Website: www.cityofchatfieldmn.gov

Chatfield is a city in Fillmore and Olmsted counties in the U.S. state of Minnesota. The population was 2,997 at the 2020 census. The city's area is split almost equally between the two counties. Chatfield is known as "The Gateway to Bluff Country" and "The Chosen Valley".

== History ==
The city was named after Judge Andrew G. Chatfield. It was founded in 1853 by Andrew Twiford, and originally served as the Fillmore county seat prior to the county being further divided. The founding population was overwhelmingly from New England. The New Englanders who founded Chatfield built a community that became so successful it was dubbed "the Chosen Valley". During the American Civil War, the Chatfield Guards militia distinguished themselves as Company A of the 2nd Minnesota Volunteer Infantry, and their commander, former engineer and newspaperman Captain (later promoted to colonel) Judson W. Bishop, later commanded the entire regiment.

== Geography ==
According to the United States Census Bureau, the city has a total area of 2.64 square miles (6.84 km^{2}). It is also the home of the only stop light in Fillmore County, at the intersection of 3rd Street (Fillmore County Road 2) and Main Street. Chatfield has two waterways within its borders, the North Branch of the Root River and a tributary, Mill Creek.

U.S. Highway 52, State Highway 30, State Highway 74, and Fillmore County Road 2 are four of the main routes in the city.

The North Branch of the Root River flows nearby, and Mill Creek runs through the town. Mill Creek is a designated trout stream.

== Demographics ==
Historical population
Census	Pop.	Note	%±
1880	9,001		—
1890	1,335		−85.2%
1900	1,426		6.8%
1910	1,228		−13.9%
1920	1,382		12.5%
1930	1,269		−8.2%
1940	1,640		29.2%
1950	1,605		−2.1%
1960	1,841		14.7%
1970	1,885		2.4%
1980	2,055		9.0%
1990	2,226		8.3%
2000	2,394		7.5%
2010	2,779		16.1%
2020	2,997		7.8%
U.S. Decennial Census

=== 2020 census ===
As of the 2020 census, Chatfield had a population of 2,997. The median age was 38.2 years. 26.0% of residents were under the age of 18 and 17.4% of residents were 65 years of age or older. For every 100 females there were 94.0 males, and for every 100 females age 18 and over there were 91.9 males age 18 and over.

0.0% of residents lived in urban areas, while 100.0% lived in rural areas.

There were 1,216 households in Chatfield, of which 34.4% had children under the age of 18 living in them. Of all households, 50.5% were married-couple households, 15.6% were households with a male householder and no spouse or partner present, and 25.2% were households with a female householder and no spouse or partner present. About 29.2% of all households were made up of individuals and 14.2% had someone living alone who was 65 years of age or older.

There were 1,262 housing units, of which 3.6% were vacant. The homeowner vacancy rate was 0.9% and the rental vacancy rate was 1.8%.

Racial composition as of the 2020 census
Race	Number	Percent
White	2,825	94.3%
Black or African American	24	0.8%
American Indian and Alaska Native	4	0.1%
Asian	15	0.5%
Native Hawaiian and Other Pacific Islander	1	0.0%
Some other race	17	0.6%
Two or more races	111	3.7%
Hispanic or Latino (of any race)	62	2.1%

=== 2010 census ===
As of the census of 2010, there were 2,779 people, 1,092 households, and 741 families living in the city. The population density was 1,052.7 inhabitants per square mile (406.4/km^{2}). There were 1,174 housing units at an average density of 444.7 per square mile (171.7/km^{2}). The racial makeup of the city was 95.1% White, 1.5% Native American, 0.3% Asian, 0.4% from other races, and 1.0% from two or more races. Hispanic or Latino of any race were 1.7% of the population.

There were 1,092 households, of which 38.6% had children under the age of 18 living with them, 52.9% were married couples living together, 11.1% had a female householder with no husband present, 3.8% had a male householder with no wife present, and 32.1% were non-families. 26.9% of all households were made up of individuals, and 14.1% had someone living alone who was 65 years of age or older. The average household size was 2.48 and the average family size was 3.03.

The median age in the city was 36.9 years. 28.6% of residents were under the age of 18; 5.7% were between the ages of 18 and 24; 26.6% were from 25 to 44; 22% were from 45 to 64; and 16.9% were 65 years of age or older. The gender makeup of the city was 46.7% male and 53.3% female.

=== 2000 census ===
As of the census of 2000, there were 2,394 people, 930 households, and 633 families living in the city. The population density was 1,201.8 inhabitants per square mile (464.0/km^{2}). There were 959 housing units at an average density of 481.4 per square mile (185.9/km^{2}). The racial makeup of the city was 98.66% White, 0.46% African American, 0.13% Native American, 0.25% Asian, 0.21% from other races, and 0.29% from two or more races. Hispanic or Latino of any race were 0.4% of the population.

There were 930 households, out of which 35.5% had children under the age of 18 living with them, 56.3% were married couples living together, 9.0% had a female householder with no husband present, and 31.9% were non-families. 27.4% of all households were made up of individuals, and 14.7% had someone living alone who was 65 years of age or older. The average household size was 2.46 and the average family size was 3.00.

In the city, the population was spread out, with 26.0% under the age of 18, 7.4% from 18 to 24, 28.7% from 25 to 44, 17.2% from 45 to 64, and 20.7% who were 65 years of age or older. The median age was 37 years. For every 100 females, there were 88.5 males. For every 100 females age 18 and over, there were 84.6 males.

The median income for a household in the city was $44,023, and the median income for a family was $53,625. Males had a median income of $32,174 versus $27,697 for females. The per capita income for the city was $20,145. About 4.9% of families and 6.5% of the population were below the poverty line, including 6.8% of those under age 18 and 12.2% of those age 65 or over.

== Education ==
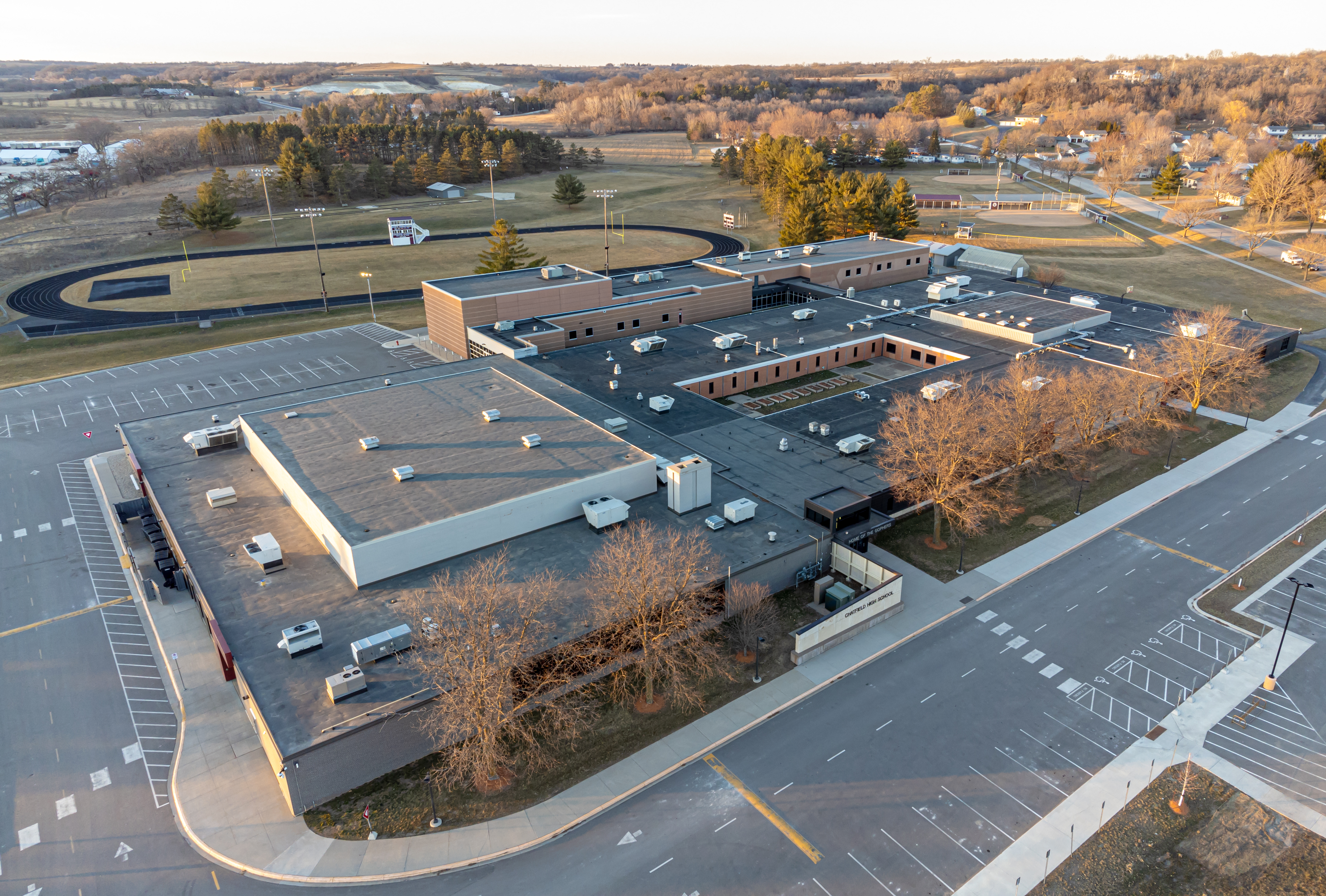
Chatfield High School

== Entertainment ==
On the second weekend of August, the town holds its annual "Western Days".

The Chatfield Brass Band Music Lending Library is a world-class sheet music library dedicated to the preservation and use of sheet music from the brass band era.

The Chatfield Center for the Arts presents live music, visual arts and theater. The Potter Auditorium was renovated in 2016.

The Pope & Young Museum of Bowhunting opened in Chatfield in 2004.

== Notable people ==
- Josef Fahrenholtz (born 2001), professional basketball player

== Gallery ==
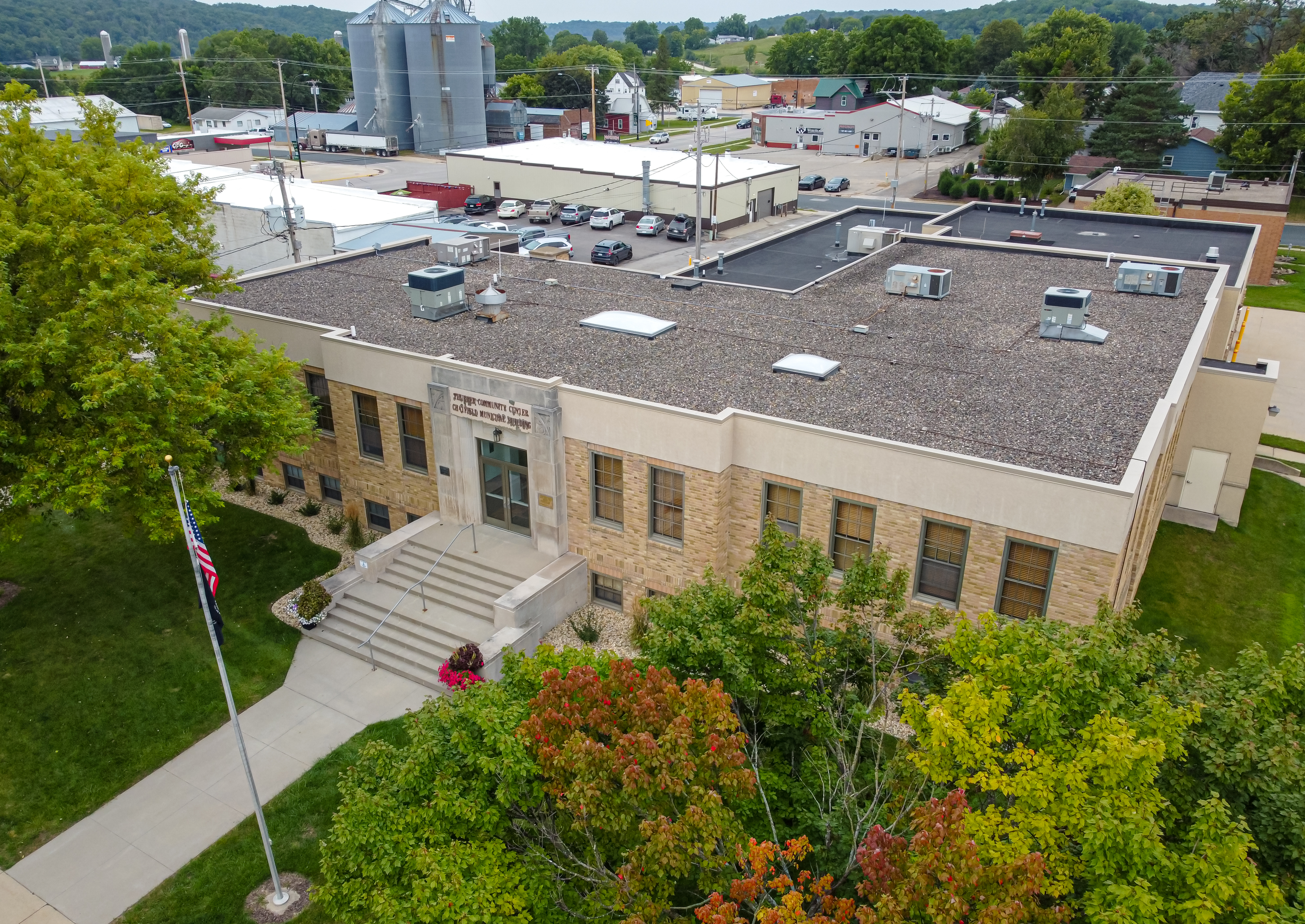
City hall

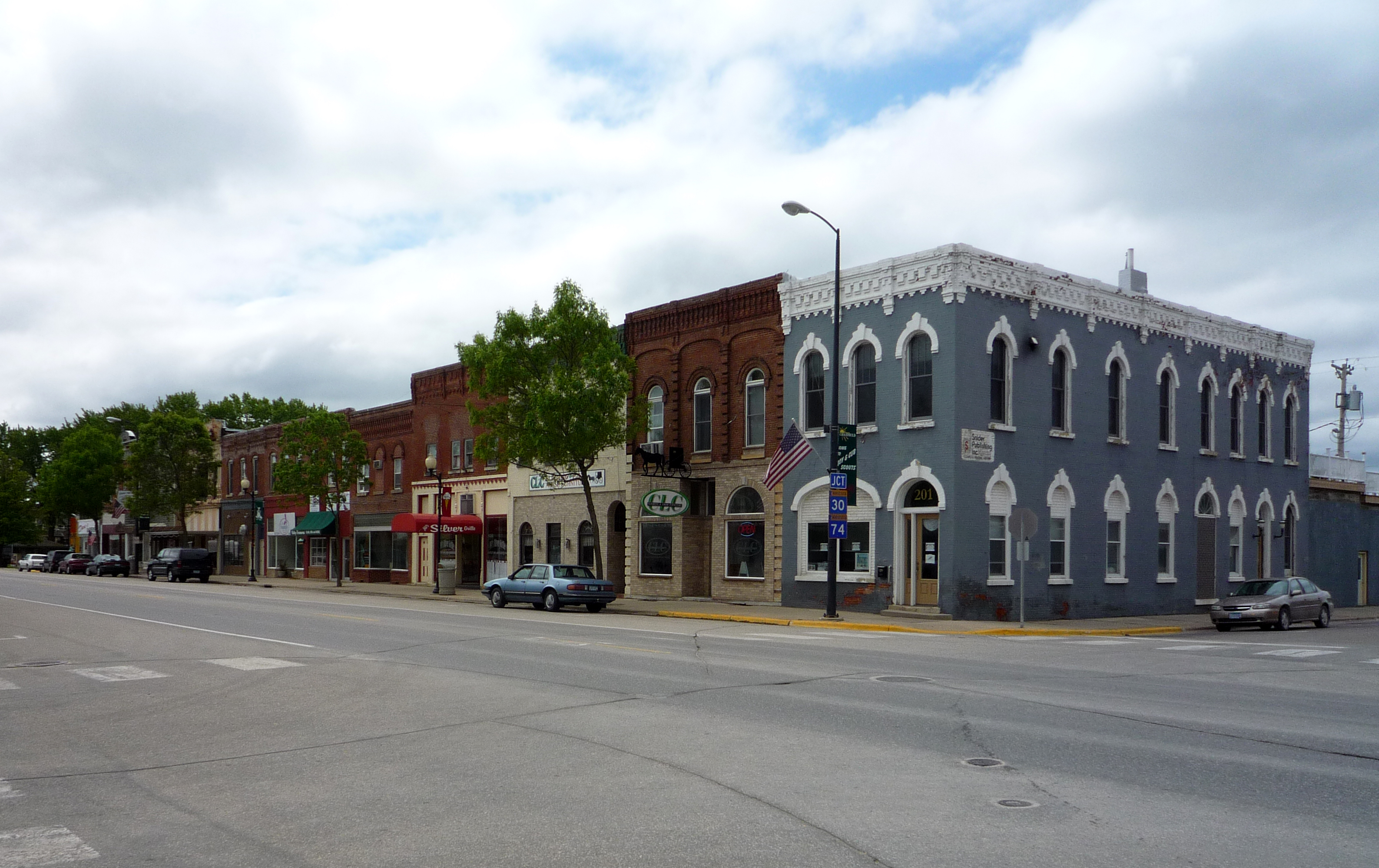
Main Street

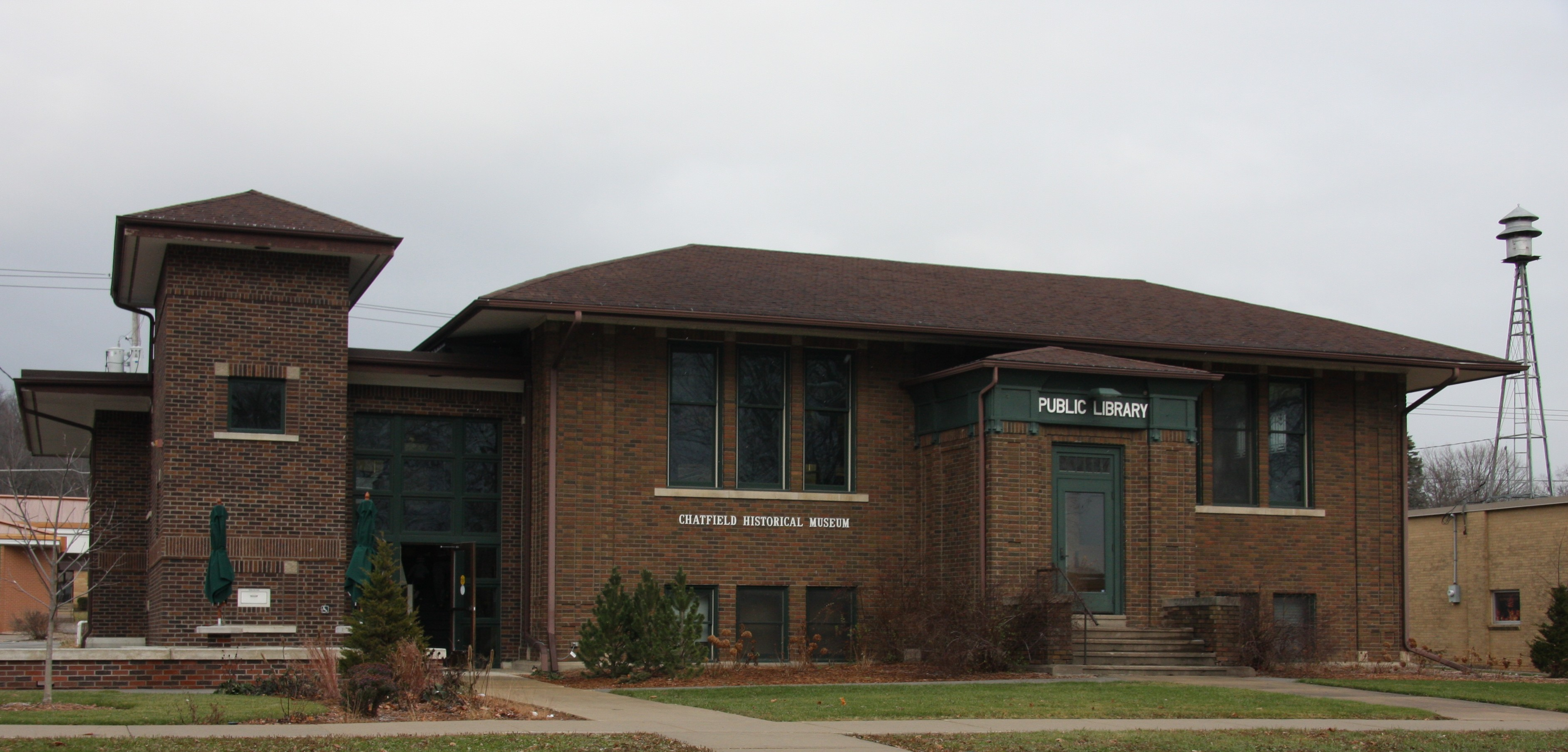
Public Library originally built as a Carnegie library

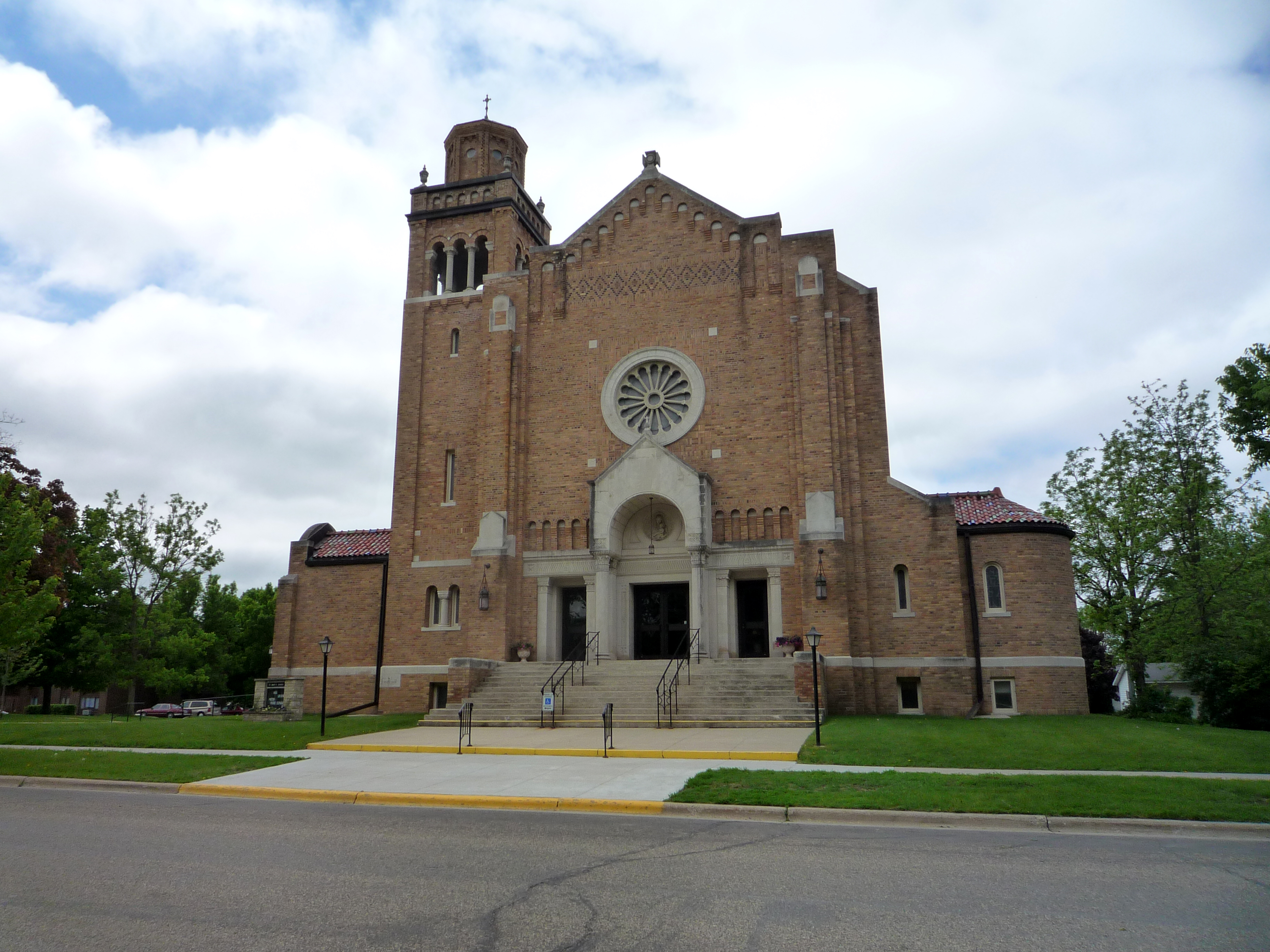
St. Mary's Catholic Church

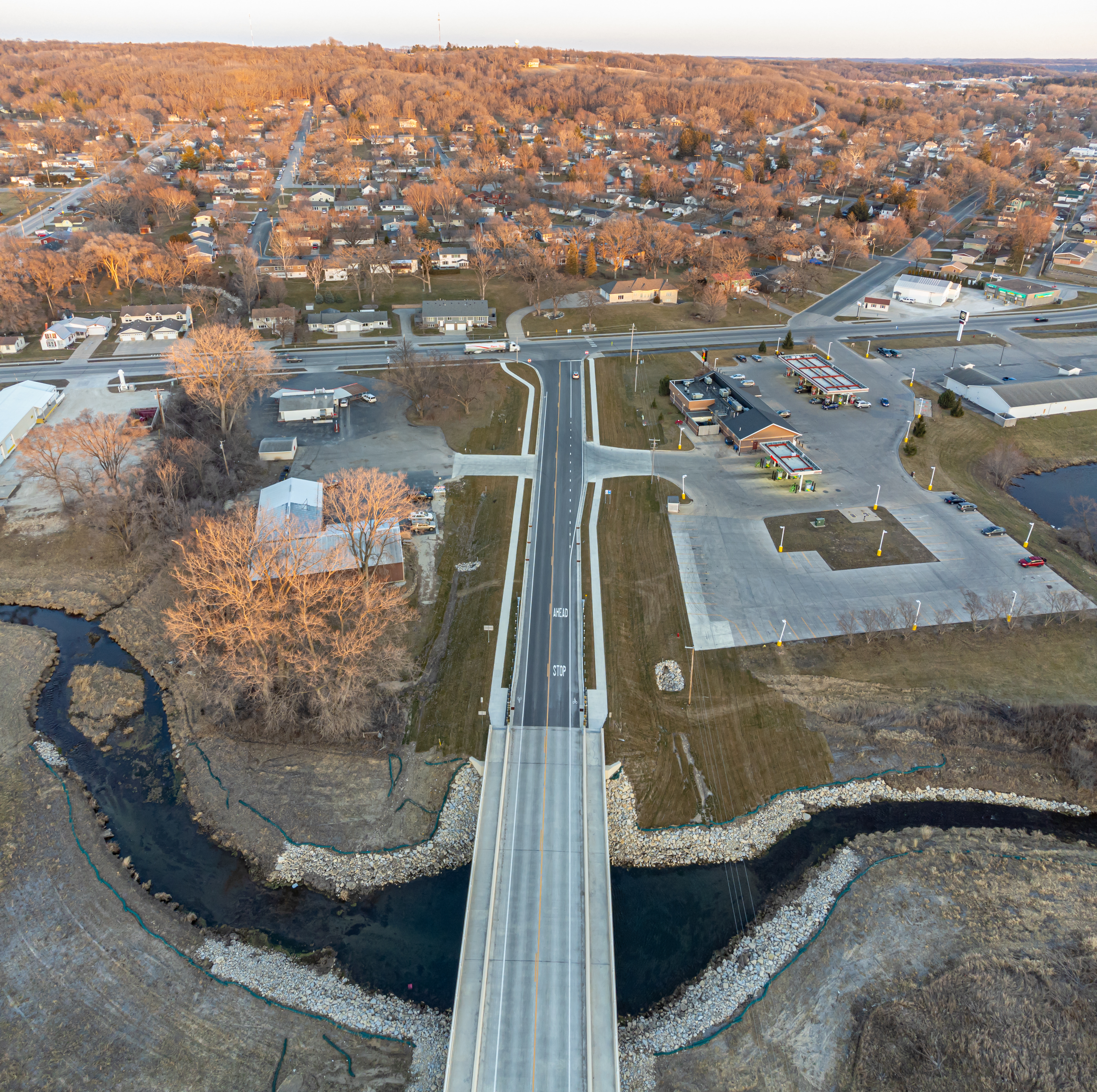
MN-30 & US-52 junction
