= Burr Oak, Iowa =

- CDP
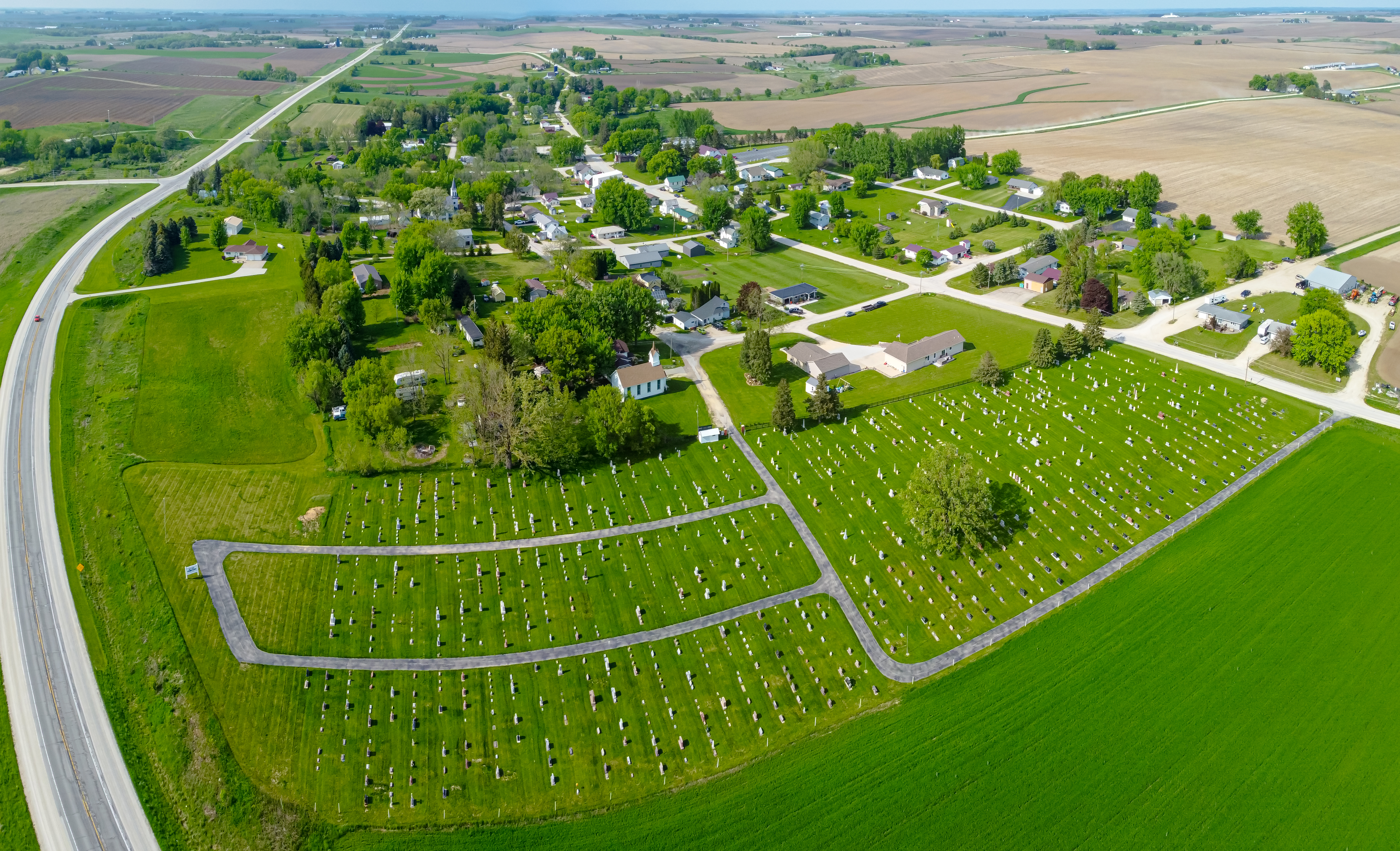
- US-52 runs by town

- Location within the state of Iowa Burr Oak, Iowa (the United States)
- Coordinates: 43°27′29″N 91°51′43″W
- Country: United States
- State: Iowa
- County: Winneshiek
- Platted: 1855

Area
  - Total: 0.69 sq mi (1.79 km^{2})
  - Land: 0.69 sq mi (1.79 km^{2})
  - Water: 0 sq mi (0.00 km^{2})
- Elevation: 1,257 ft (383 m)

Population (2020)
  - Total: 171
  - Density: 247.9/sq mi (95.73/km^{2})
- Time zone: UTC-6 (Central (CST))
  - Summer (DST): UTC-5 (CDT)
- ZIP code: 52101
- Area code: 563
- FIPS code: 19-09640
- GNIS feature ID: 2629959

Burr Oak is an unincorporated community and census-designated place (CDP) in Winneshiek County, Iowa, United States, very close to the Minnesota state line. Burr Oak is a census-designated place and the population was 171 in the 2020 census.

== History ==
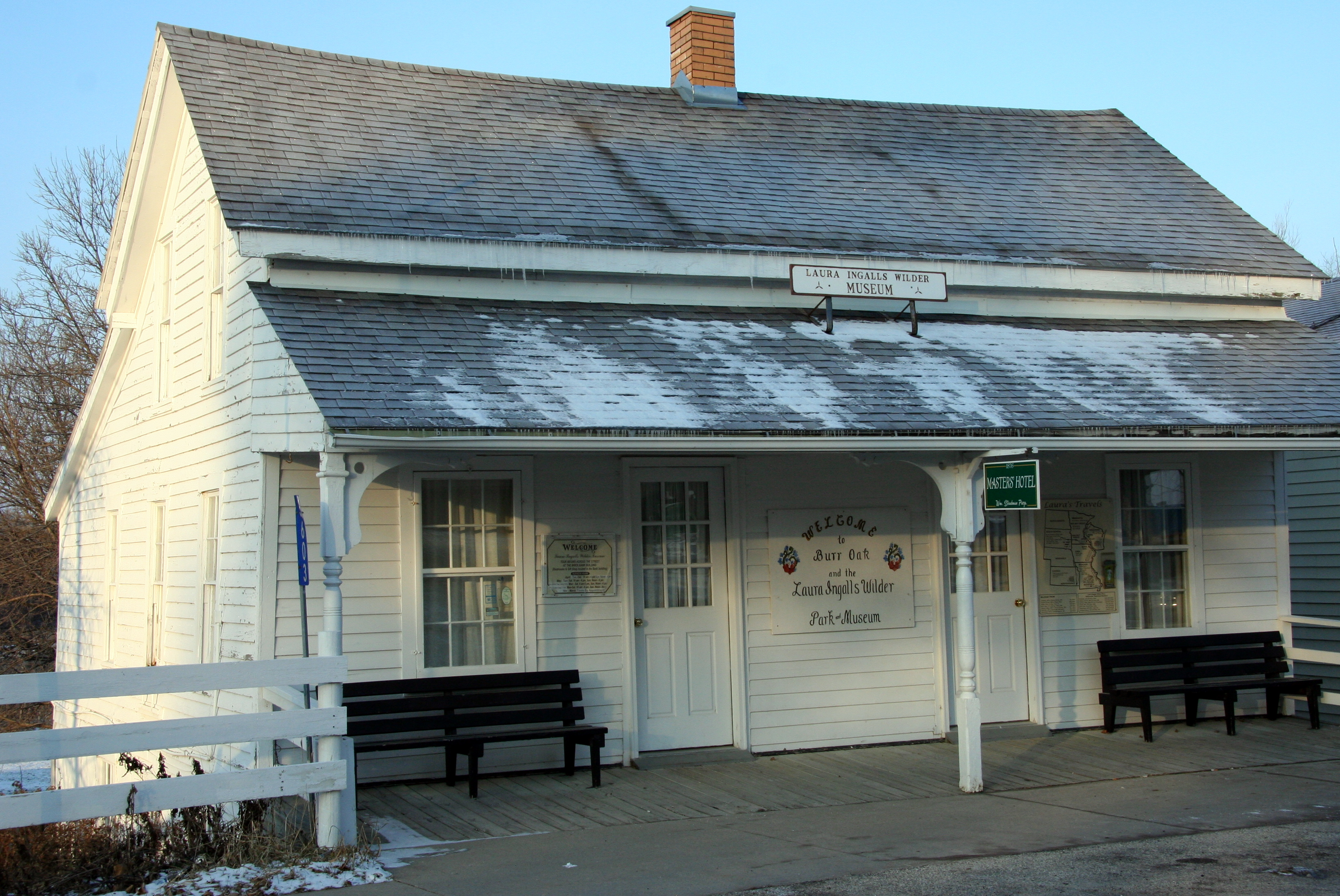
Masters Hotel – The Laura Ingalls Wilder Museum

A post office opened in 1853. Burr Oak was platted in 1855.

The village is one of the homes of Laura Ingalls Wilder, author of the Little House on the Prairie books. Grace Ingalls, the youngest of the Ingalls children, was born there in 1877. There is a Laura Ingalls Wilder Museum in the local Masters Hotel.

Hamlin Garland, noted American novelist, poet, essayist, short story writer, Georgist, and psychical researcher lived on a farm in Hesper Township, near Burr Oak during the 1870s.

The population was 150 in 1940.

== Demographics ==
Historical population
Census	Pop.	Note	%±
2010	166		—
2020	171		3.0%
U.S. Decennial Census

=== 2020 census ===
As of the census of 2020, there were 171 people, 77 households, and 54 families residing in the community. The population density was 247.9 inhabitants per square mile (95.7/km^{2}). There were 82 housing units at an average density of 118.9 per square mile (45.9/km^{2}). The racial makeup of the community was 95.3% White, 0.0% Black or African American, 1.2% Native American, 0.0% Asian, 0.0% Pacific Islander, 1.8% from other races and 1.8% from two or more races. Hispanic or Latino persons of any race comprised 2.3% of the population.

Of the 77 households, 26.0% of which had children under the age of 18 living with them, 57.1% were married couples living together, 2.6% were cohabitating couples, 16.9% had a female householder with no spouse or partner present and 23.4% had a male householder with no spouse or partner present. 29.9% of all households were non-families. 28.6% of all households were made up of individuals, 16.9% had someone living alone who was 65 years old or older.

The median age in the community was 44.3 years. 27.5% of the residents were under the age of 20; 4.7% were between the ages of 20 and 24; 19.9% were from 25 and 44; 30.4% were from 45 and 64; and 17.5% were 65 years of age or older. The gender makeup of the community was 59.1% male and 40.9% female.

=== 2010 census ===
As of the census of 2010, there were 166 people, 70 households, and 43 families residing in the town. The population density was 240.6 inhabitants per square mile (92.9/km^{2}). There were 80 housing units at an average density of 115.9 per square mile (44.7/km^{2}). The racial makeup of the town was 97.0% White, 0.6% Asian, and 2.4% from other races. Hispanic or Latino of any race were 2.4% of the population.

There were 70 households, out of which 31.4% had children under the age of 18 living with them, 52.9% were married couples living together, 8.6% had a female householder with no husband present, and 38.6% were non-families. 31.4% of all households were made up of individuals, and 11.4% had someone living alone who was 65 years of age or older. The average household size was 2.37 and the average family size was 3.05.

In the city the population was spread out, with 24.1% under the age of 18, 10.7% from 18 to 24, 22.8% from 25 to 44, 28.8% from 45 to 64, and 13.3% who were 65 years of age or older. The median age was 39.2 years. The gender makeup of the city was 52.4% male and 47.6% female.

== Education ==
The community is within the Decorah Community School District. The schools are in Decorah, and Decorah High School is the zoned high school of the district.

Previously Burr Oak was within the North Winneshiek Community School District. The school building was 3 miles (4.8 km) from Burr Oak. North Winneshiek CSD operated all grade levels until 2001, when it ended its high school program. According to district agreements, students in the district could attend Decorah High or the high school program of Mabel-Canton Public Schools in Mabel, Minnesota. Effective July 1, 2018 the North Winneshiek district consolidated into the Decorah district. North Winneshiek School closed its doors at that time.

In 2018 the combined interim board of Decorah CSD and North Winneshiek CSD approved an agreement with Mabel-Canton schools, effective for five years, to allow students in the former North Winneshiek district boundary to attend Mabel-Canton if they choose. The agreement applies to any post-merger Decorah CSD resident who is geographically closer to Mabel than to Decorah.

== See also ==
- Kinney Octagon Barn An octagonal barn on the National Register of Historic Places.
- National Register of Historic Places listings in Winneshiek County
