= Highlandville =

Highlandville may refer to:

- Highlandville, Iowa
- Highlandville, Missouri
