= Highlandville, Iowa =

- Unincorporated community
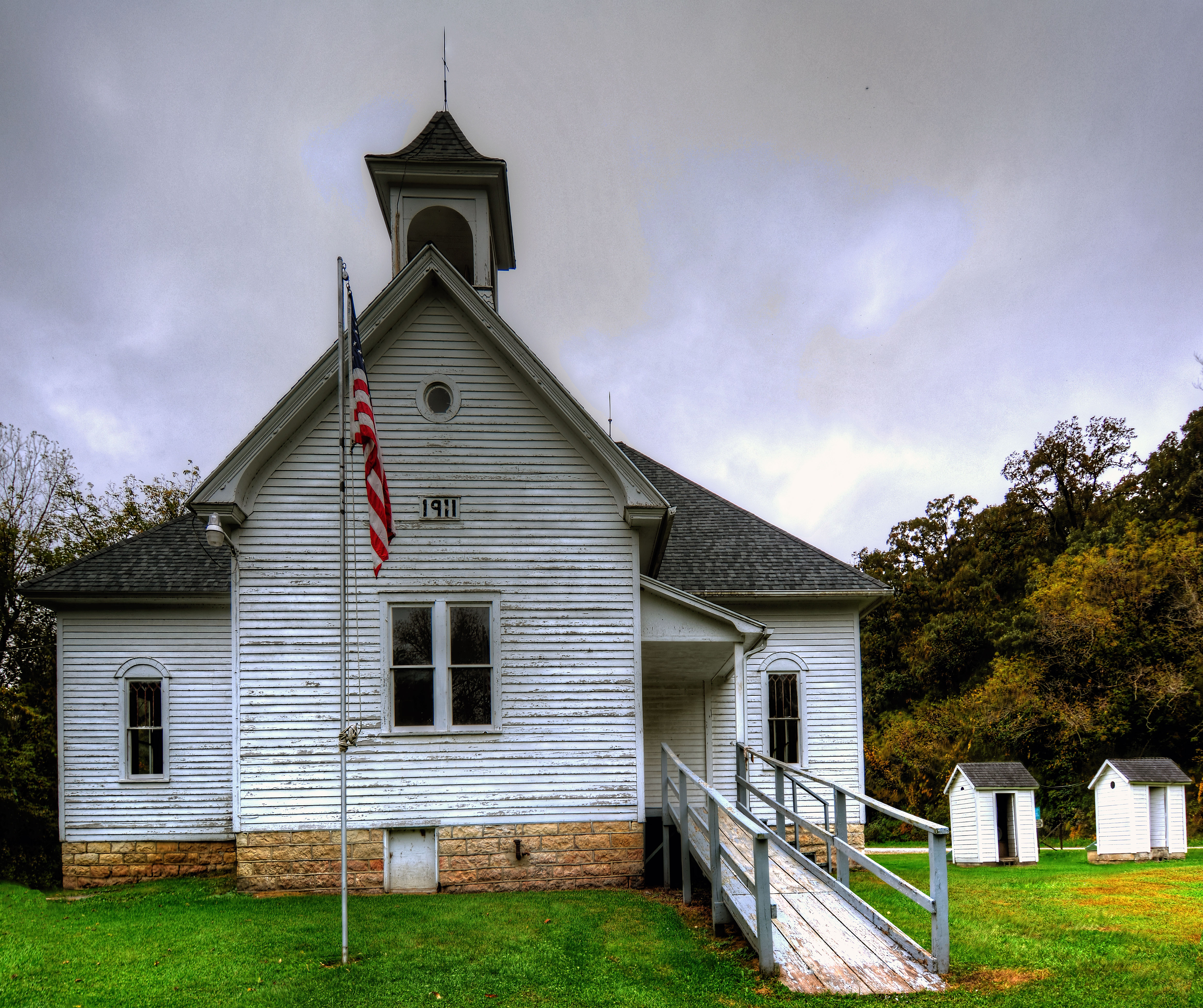
- Highlandville School

- Location within the state of Iowa Highlandville, Iowa (the United States)
- Coordinates: 43°26′32″N 91°40′7″W
- Country: United States
- State: Iowa
- County: Winneshiek
- Elevation: 945 ft (288 m)
- Time zone: UTC-6 (Central (CST))
  - Summer (DST): UTC-5 (CDT)
- ZIP codes: 52149
- GNIS feature ID: 457486

Highlandville is an unincorporated community in northeastern Winneshiek County, Iowa, United States. The community is located along local roads northeast of the city of Decorah, the county seat of Winneshiek County. The community's elevation is 945 feet (288 m).

== History ==
A post office opened in Highlandville in 1868, closing in 1985. The population was 56 in 1940.

== Education ==
The community is within the Decorah Community School District. Decorah High School in Decorah is the designated high school.

Highlandville School served as a one room schoolhouse for Highlandville.

Previously the community was within the North Winneshiek Community School District. North Winneshiek CSD operated all grade levels until 2001, when it ended its high school program. According to district agreements, students in the district could attend Decorah High or the high school program of Mabel-Canton Public Schools in Mabel, Minnesota. Effective July 1, 2018 the North Winneshiek district consolidated into the Decorah district. North Winneshiek School closed its doors at that time.

In 2018 the combined interim board of Decorah CSD and North Winneshiek CSD approved an agreement with Mabel-Canton schools, effective for five years, to allow students in the former North Winneshiek district boundary to attend Mabel-Canton if they choose. The agreement applies to any post-merger Decorah CSD resident who is geographically closer to Mabel than to Decorah.
