= Decorah Community School District =

Public school district in Decorah, Iowa, United States

Coordinates: 43.299859°N 91.786877°W

Location
- Decorah, Iowa Winneshiek County and Allamakee County United States
- Coordinates: 43.299859, -91.786877

District information
- Type: Local school district
- Grades: K-12
- Superintendent: Tim Cronin
- Schools: 5
- Budget: $26,129,000 (2020-21)
- NCES District ID: 1908730

Students and staff
- Students: 1663 (2022-23)
- Teachers: 120.63 FTE
- Staff: 130.86 FTE
- Student–teacher ratio: 13.79
- Athletic conference: Northeast Iowa
- District mascot: Vikings
- Colors: Red and Royal Blue

Other information
- Website: www.decorah.k12.ia.us

The Decorah Community School District is a rural public school district located in Decorah, Iowa, United States. The district is almost entirely in Winneshiek County, with a small portion in Allamakee County. In addition to Decorah, the census-designated place of Burr Oak is in the district boundary. Other unincorporated areas in the district include Bluffton, Freeport, Hesper, Highlandville, Locust, and Nordness.

== History ==
In 2001 the North Winneshiek Community School District ended its high school program. That year it entered into an agreement with Decorah CSD to allow students from its boundary to attend Decorah High School.

In the 2012-2013 school year the district had 1,419 students.

In 2016, the North Winneshiek district agreed to consolidate with the Decorah CSD. Reasons for the decision to consolidate were rising costs and declining enrollment. As a part of the consolidation process, North Winneshiek 7th and 8th grade students began to attend Decorah Middle School at the beginning of the 2017–2018 school year, before fully consolidating in the 2019–2020 school year.

In 2018 voters in the districts agreed to make the consolidation final, with Decorah voters saying yes on a 621-104 basis and North Winnishiek voters saying yes on a 224-32 basis. Andrew Wind of the WCF Courier described the result as "overwhelming". Effective July 1, 2018 the North Winneshiek district consolidated into the Decorah district. The pre-merger Decorah CSD had almost 175 square miles (450 km^{2}) of area while North Winneshiek had about 135 square miles (350 km^{2}) of area.

In 2018 the combined interim board of Decorah CSD and North Winneshiek CSD approved an agreement with Mabel-Canton Public Schools in Minnesota, effective for five years, to allow students in the former North Winneshiek district boundary to attend Mabel-Canton if they choose. The agreement applies to any post-merger Decorah CSD resident who is geographically closer to Mabel, Minnesota, the location of the Mabel-Canton school, than to Decorah, where all Decorah CSD campuses are located.

== Schools ==
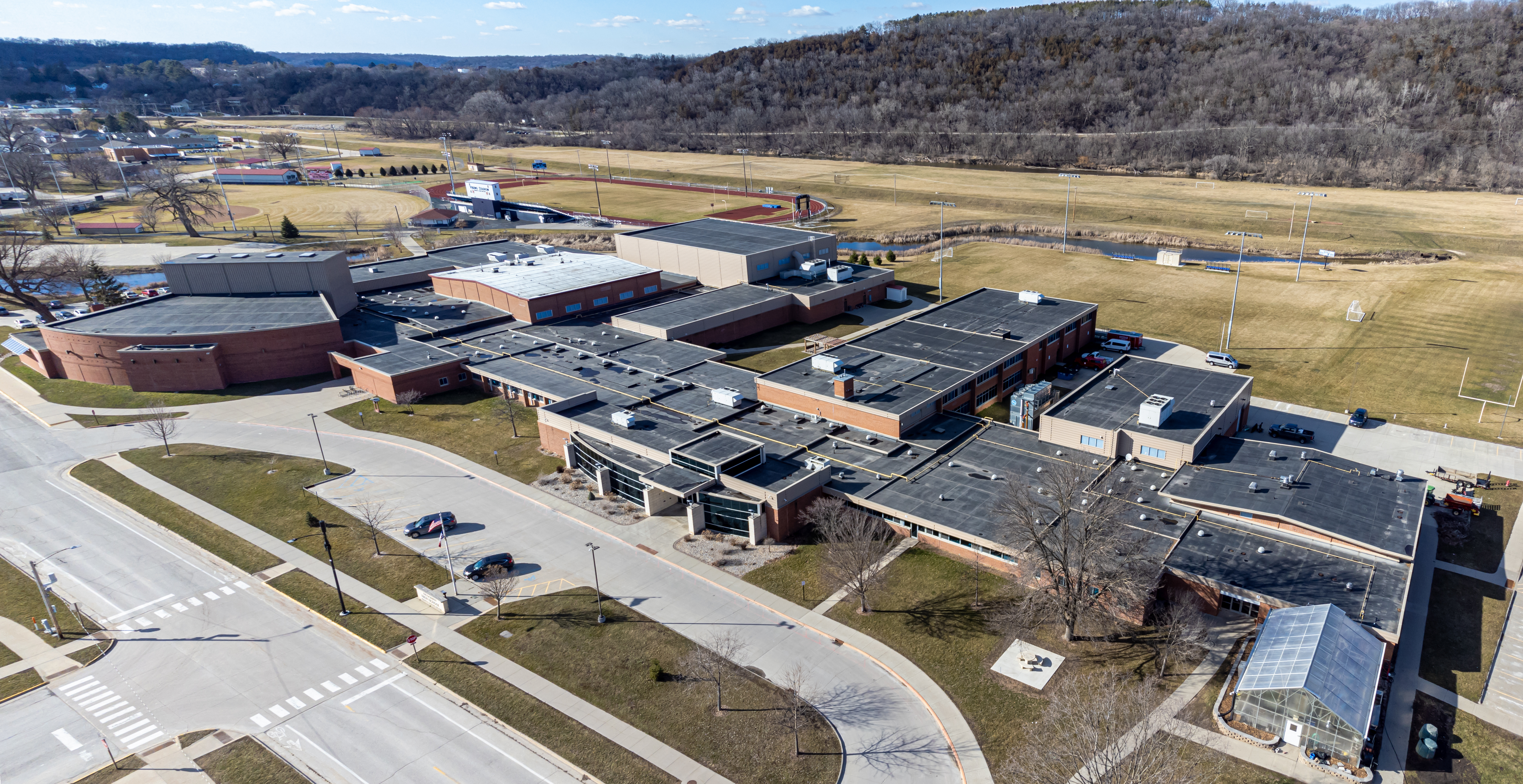
Decorah High School

School buildings in the district, all of which are in Decorah, include:

- Decorah High School
- Decorah Middle School
- Carrie Lee Elementary
- John Cline Elementary
- West Side Early Childhood Center (ECC)

North Winneshiek School, which is no longer open, is now in the possession of Decorah CSD, which spent $88,000 on upkeep from July 1, 2019 through January 27 of the following year.

== See also ==
- List of school districts in Iowa
