= Decorah High School =

Public secondary school in Decorah, Iowa, United States

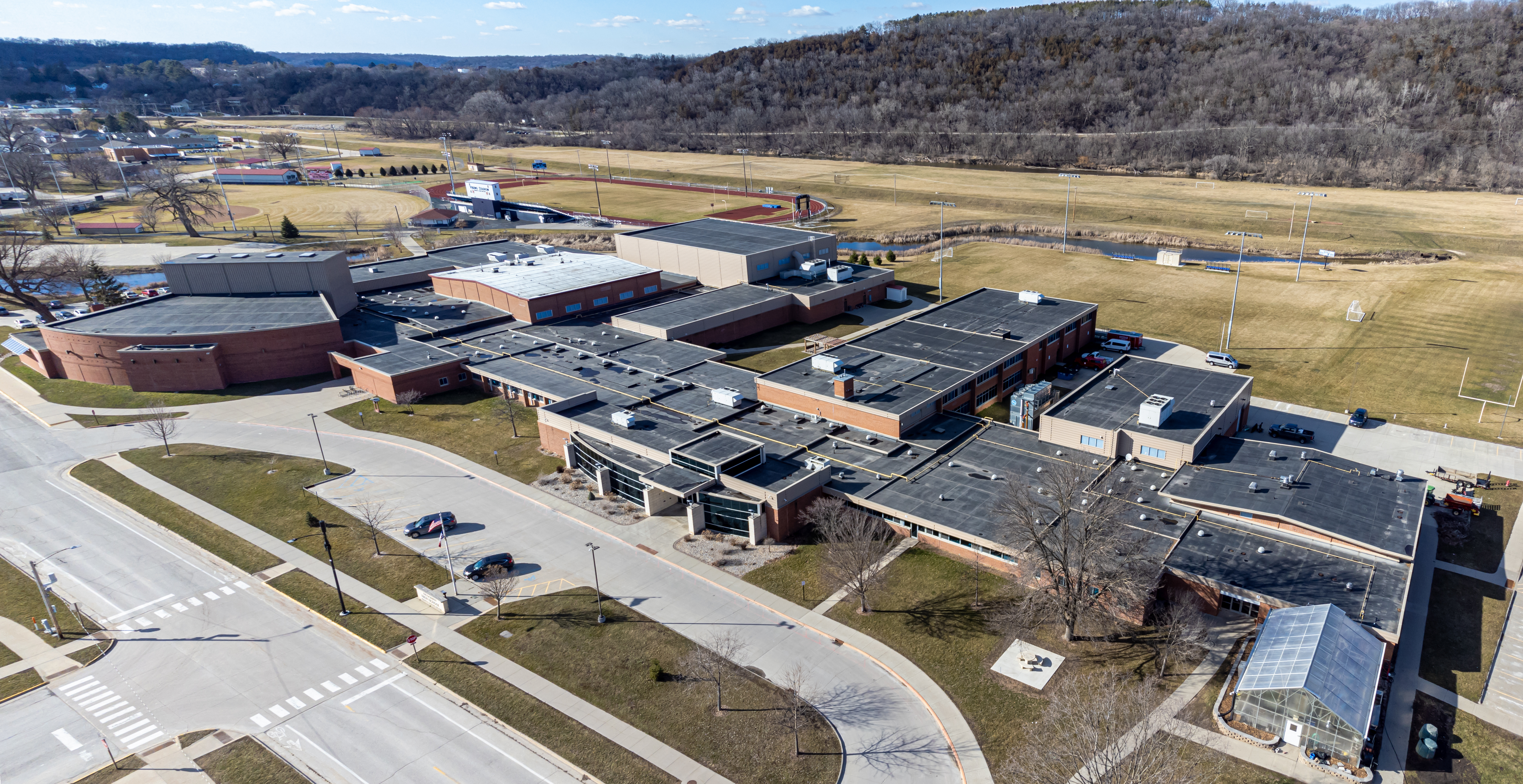

Location
- 100 Claiborne Drive; Decorah, IA 52101; United States; 43.3068°N 91.785419°W

Information
- Type: Public secondary
- School district: Decorah Community School District
- Principal: Brad Hurst
- Staff: 38.54 (FTE)
- Grades: 9-12
- Enrollment: 569 (2023-2024)
- Student to teacher ratio: 14.76
- Campus type: Rural, fringe
- Colors: Red and Royal Blue
- Athletics conference: Northeast Iowa
- Mascot: Vikings
- Rival: Waverly-Shell Rock High School
- Website: decorah.k12.ia.us/school/decorah-high-school/

Decorah High School is a public high school located in Decorah, Iowa. The school colors are red and royal blue, and the mascot is the Vikings. It is a part of the Decorah Community School District.

In addition to Decorah, the census-designated place of Burr Oak is in the district boundary, and therefore the high school's attendance area. Other unincorporated areas in the district include Bluffton, Freeport, Hesper, Highlandville, Locust, and Nordness.

This map shows the incorporated and unincorporated areas in Winneshiek County, Iowa, highlighting Decorah in red.

== History ==
In 2001 the North Winneshiek Community School District ended its high school program. That year it entered into an agreement with Decorah CSD to allow students from its boundary to attend Decorah High. Effective July 1, 2018 the North Winneshiek district consolidated into the Decorah district.

In September 2025, Decorah High School partnered with Luther College (Iowa) to award students with preferred admission and scholarship opportunities. To be awarded preferred admission and an associated $500 award, students must have a minimum unweighted GPA of 3.25 and complete Algebra II by the end of their junior year.

== Athletics ==
Decorah is a founding member of the Northeast Iowa Conference, and participates in the following sports:

- Cross Country
  - Boys' 15-time State Champions (1957, 1958, 1959, 1964, 1966, 1967, 1968, 1972, 1974, 1976, 1977, 1978, 1990, 1992, 2012)
  - Girls' 8-time State Champions (1976, 1980, 1982, 2007, 2012, 2013, 2014, 2016)
- Volleyball
- Football
  - 5-time Class 3A State Champions (1974, 1987, 1988, 1989, 2012)
- Basketball
- Swimming
- Wrestling
  - Girls' State Champions (2024)
- Track and Field
  - Boys' 2-time Class 3A State Champions (2004, 2012)
- Soccer
- Tennis
  - Boys' 4-time Class 1A State Champions (1996, 1997, 1998, 2015)
  - Girls' 5-time Class 1A State Champions (1994, 1998, 1999, 2000, 2003)
- Golf
  - Boys' 2-time State Champions (1968, 2012)
  - Girls' 3-time Class 2A State Champions (1981, 1982, 1984)
- Baseball
  - 3-time State Champions (1970, 1990, 1991)
- Softball

According to an online database compiled by the Des Moines Register, Decorah has won 46 state championships, which is believed to be sixth most statewide, most among schools classified as 3A or smaller, and more than twice the number of any other conference school.

Decorah has won the Northeast Iowa Conference All-Sports Championship ten times since its creation in the 1976–77 school year.

Decorah has won the Northeast Iowa Conference Sportsmanship Award eight of the ten years it has been awarded. The award is based on ratings of players, coaches and fans reported to the Iowa High School Athletic Association and the Iowa Girls High School Athletic Union by contest officials.

Former Decorah baseball coach Dennis Olejniczak has the second most wins of any high school baseball coach in the United States.

Since 2004, the Decorah girls cross country team has been a powerhouse program, appearing in 13 out of 14 State 3A meets (2004–2017) with 12 top-5 finishes and state titles in 2007, 2012, 2013, 2014, and 2016. The team currently holds the longest consecutive championship streak in the Northeast Iowa Conference with an active streak of 15 consecutive titles.

== Awards ==
Decorah High School was awarded a National Blue Ribbon School in 2011, and again in 2025.

Decorah has been awarded the Bank Iowa Challenge Cup for the 2007–08, 2008–09, 2009–10, 2011–12, 2012-13 school years.

== Bond issue ==
The voting population of Decorah approved, in 2010, a referendum on a roughly $20 million bonding bill to pay for a renovation of Decorah High School. It was approved with a 69% public "yes" vote. Changes will include a new gymnasium, completed in the spring of 2012, and a complete renovation of the entire building, including updating and replacing the heating, cooling, electrical and communication systems, repairing the roof, creating a "safe room" for security and safety during severe weather, and restructuring the cafeteria and gym areas.

== Notable alumni ==
- Josey Jewell, American football player
- Jerry Reichow, American football player
- Georgann Johnson, actress
- Rob Sand, Iowa State Auditor, Iowa Governor-elect

== See also ==
- List of high schools in Iowa
