= Freeport, Iowa =

- Unincorporated community
- Location within the state of Iowa Freeport, Iowa (the United States)
- Coordinates: 43°18′08″N 91°44′37″W
- Country: United States
- State: Iowa
- County: Winneshiek
- Elevation: 846 ft (258 m)
- Time zone: UTC-6 (Central (CST))
  - Summer (DST): UTC-5 (CDT)
- GNIS feature ID: 456760

Freeport is an unincorporated community in northeastern Winneshiek County, Iowa, United States.

== History ==
A post office was established in April 1854, and remained in operation until being discontinued in November 1905.

William H. Strayer (1866-1946), Oregon state senator and lawyer, was born in Freeport.

The population was 125 in 1940.

== Education ==
The community is within the Decorah Community School District. Decorah High School in Decorah is the designated high school.
