= Highlandville School =

- U.S. National Register of Historic Places
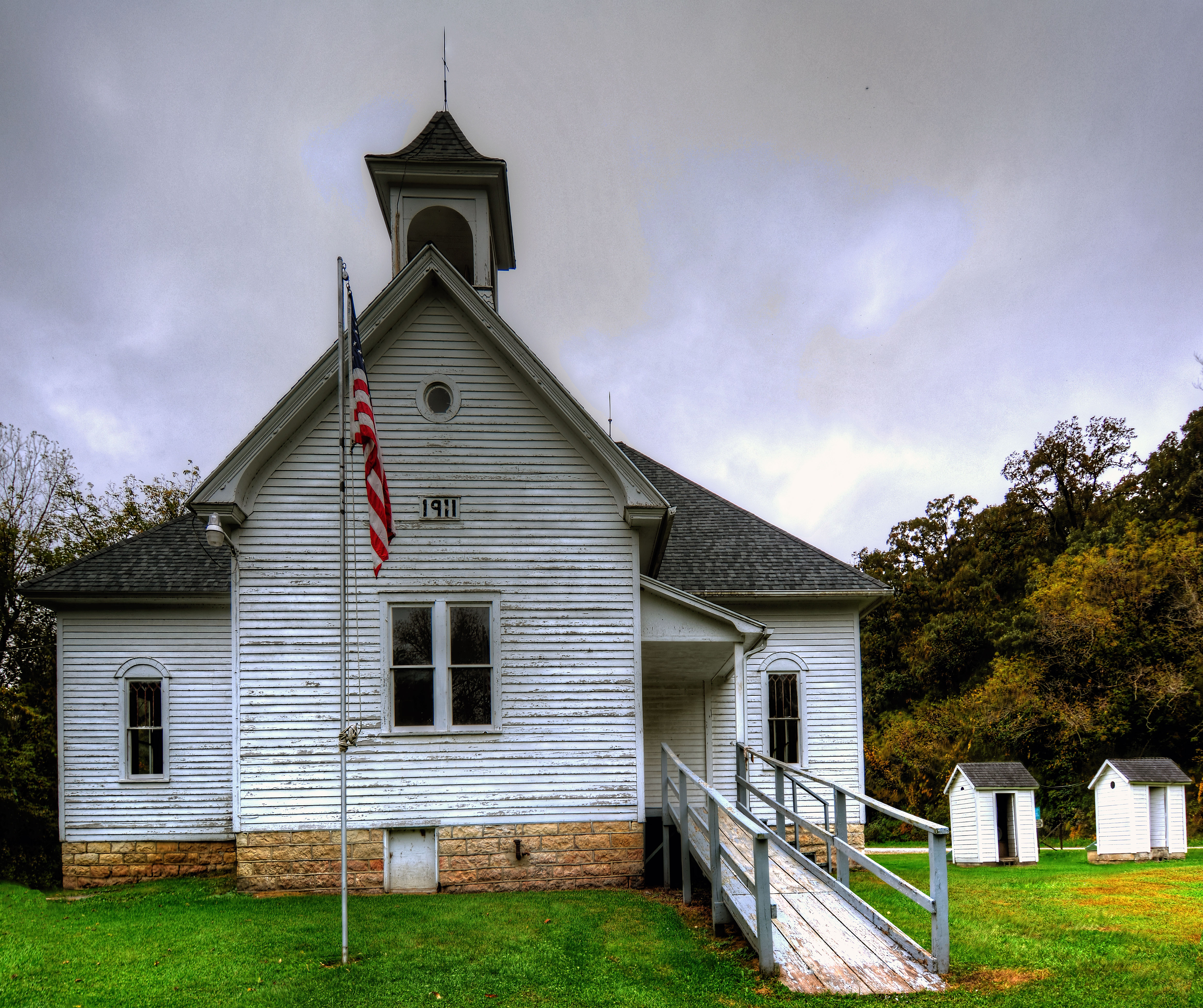

- Location within Iowa Location within the United States
- Location: 3499 Highlandville Rd.
- Nearest city: Decorah, Iowa
- Coordinates: 43°26′32″N 91°40′12″W
- Built: 1911
- Built by: W.H. Hopper
- Architectural style: Late 19th and Early 20th Century Movements
- NRHP reference No.: 13001141
- Added to NRHP: February 5, 2014

Highlandville School, also known as Highlandville Village School, is a historic structure located in the unincorporated community of Highlandville, Iowa, United States. It was built in 1911, replacing a 1904 building that was destroyed in a fire. The frame building follows a broad T-plan. The top of the T is a two-room rectangular section capped with a hip roof. A single-room, central projecting gable-front with a belfry forms the T's upright. The front section was used an entryway/coatroom, while the two-room back section housed the classrooms. The frame structure rests on a limestone basement. An entrance ramp replaces the original entrance steps. Two privies, which share the historic designation, are located to the north of the main building. The school was operated independently until 1960, and it closed in 1964. It stands as a reminder of the state of Iowa's determination to educate its citizens, particularly in the rural areas. It is also a unique rural two-room schoolhouse in Winneshiek County. The building was listed on the National Register of Historic Places in 2014.
