= North Winneshiek Community School District =

Former school district in Iowa

Location
- 3495 North Winneshiek Road, Decorah, Iowa 52101 United States

District information
- Type: Public school district
- Grades: Pre-K to 8 (2001-2017) (Pre)K-6 (2017-2019) (Pre)K-12/1-12 (1965-2001); 1-9 (1964-1965)
- Superintendent: Tim Dugger (last)
- Schools: 1

Students and staff
- Students: 126 (2015–2016)
- Teachers: 17
- District mascot: Mustangs
- Colors: Black and Gold

Other information
- Website: Official website

The North Winneshiek Community School District was a public school district in unincorporated northern Winneshiek County, Iowa, with a Decorah address. At the end of the district's existence, it only served grades Pre-K through 6th. The enrollment count for the 2015–2016 school year was 126 students.

The district, which was about 135 square miles (350 km^{2}) of area, was entirely in Winneshiek County, and served the census-designated place of Burr Oak, as well as these unincorporated areas: Bluffton, Hesper, and Highlandville.

== Governance ==
The school district was governed by a School Board with five members. The district was overseen by Superintendent Tim Dugger.

== History ==
The consolidated school opened in 1964, replacing one room schoolhouses. Initially it served up to grade nine, but it began serving all levels of senior high school the following year. The first Superintendent was Gordon Christianson. Initial enrollment was about 400. The residents wanted to retain a school with a rural atmosphere.

== Schools ==
The North Winneshiek Community School was the district's lone school, serving grades Pre-K through 6th Grade at the end of the district's life. The former school, 3 miles (4.8 km) from Burr Oak, and north of Decorah, is located in Hesper Township.

In 2002 the school district closed its high school and entered into agreements with the Decorah Community School District that year, and also at one point with the Mabel-Canton School District to allow North Winneshiek High School students to attend Decorah High School and the Mabel-Canton high school program.

In 2018 the enrollment was 165.

== Consolidation ==
In 2016 the North Winneshiek Community School District agreed to consolidate with Decorah CSD. Reasons for the decision to consolidate were rising costs and declining enrollment.

As a part of the consolidation process, North Winneshiek 7th and 8th grade students were to begin to attend Decorah Middle School at the beginning of the 2016–2017 school year, before fully consolidating for the 2019–2020 school year.

The grade-sharing agreement was modified. Additionally the consolidated interim board signed an agreement with Mabel-Canton so North Winneshiek area students may continue to attend Mabel-Canton. The North Winn board also agreed to share a librarian with the MFL Mar Mac Community School District for the remainder of the district's life.

In 2018 voters in the districts agreed to make the consolidation final, with North Winneshiek voters saying yes on a 224-32 basis and Decorah voters doing so on a 621-104 basis. Andrew Wind of the WCF Courier described the result as "overwhelming".

Wind added that "If the vote hadn't passed in either district, North Winneshiek would have eventually closed or dissolved." Effective July 1, 2019 the North Winneshiek district consolidated into the Decorah district. North Winneshiek School closed its doors at that time.

== See also ==
- Non-high school district - Post-2001 period
