= Canton, Minnesota =

City in Minnesota, United States

Canton
- City
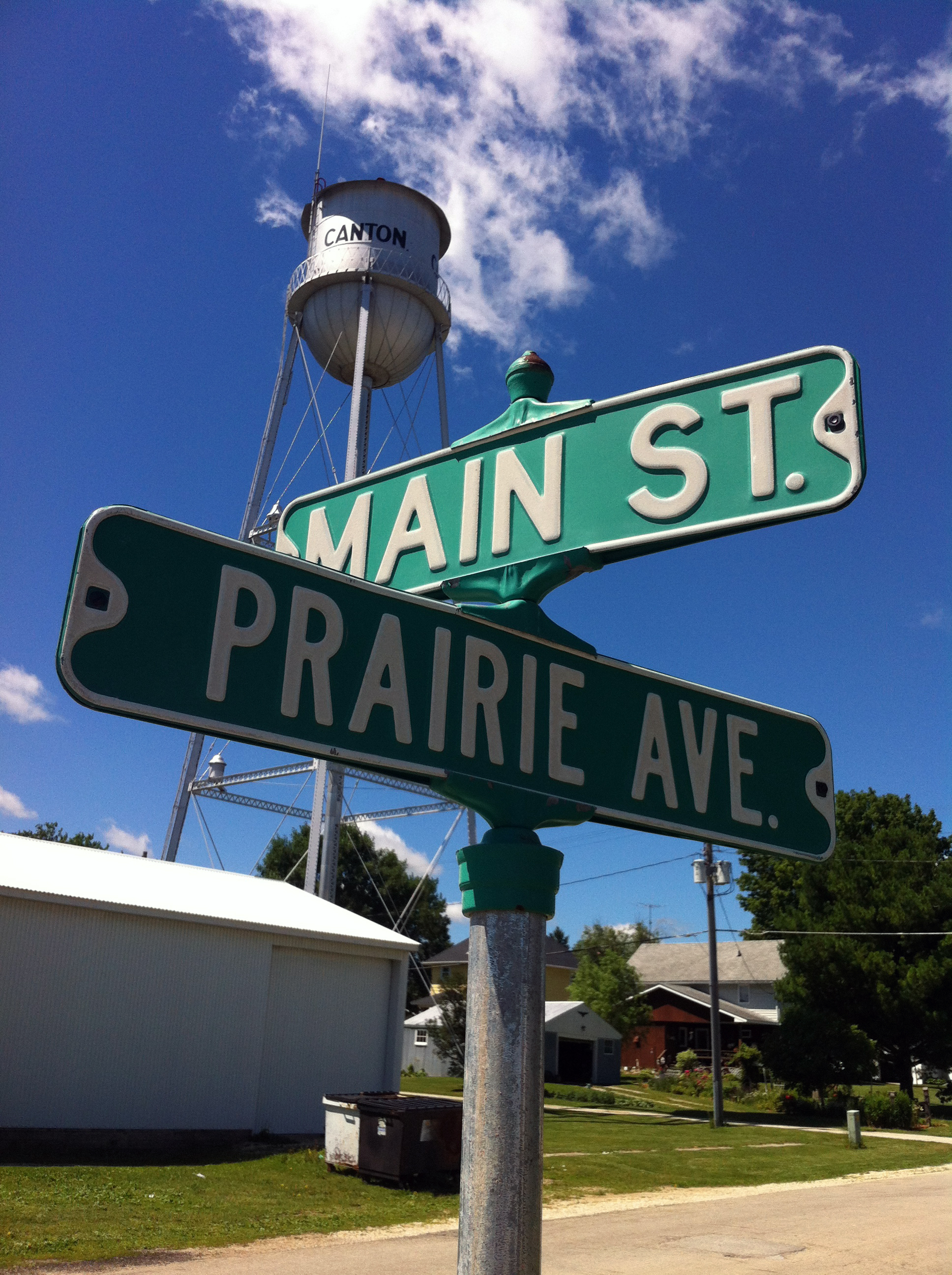
- Street signs and water tower

- Location of Canton, Minnesota
- Coordinates: 43°31′47″N 91°55′48″W
- Country: United States
- State: Minnesota
- County: Fillmore

Area
  - Total: 1.03 sq mi (2.67 km^{2})
  - Land: 1.03 sq mi (2.67 km^{2})
  - Water: 0 sq mi (0.00 km^{2})
- Elevation: 1,342 ft (409 m)

Population (2020)
  - Total: 310
  - Density: 300.8/sq mi (116.14/km^{2})
- Time zone: UTC-6 (Central (CST))
  - Summer (DST): UTC-5 (CDT)
- ZIP code: 55922
- Area code: 507
- FIPS code: 27-09802
- GNIS feature ID: 2393733

Canton is a city in Fillmore County, Minnesota, United States. As of the 2020 census, Canton had a population of 310.

== History ==
A post office called Canton has been in operation since 1882. Canton was incorporated in 1887. The city was named after Canton, Ohio.

The city was previously served by passenger rail at Canton station.

== Geography ==
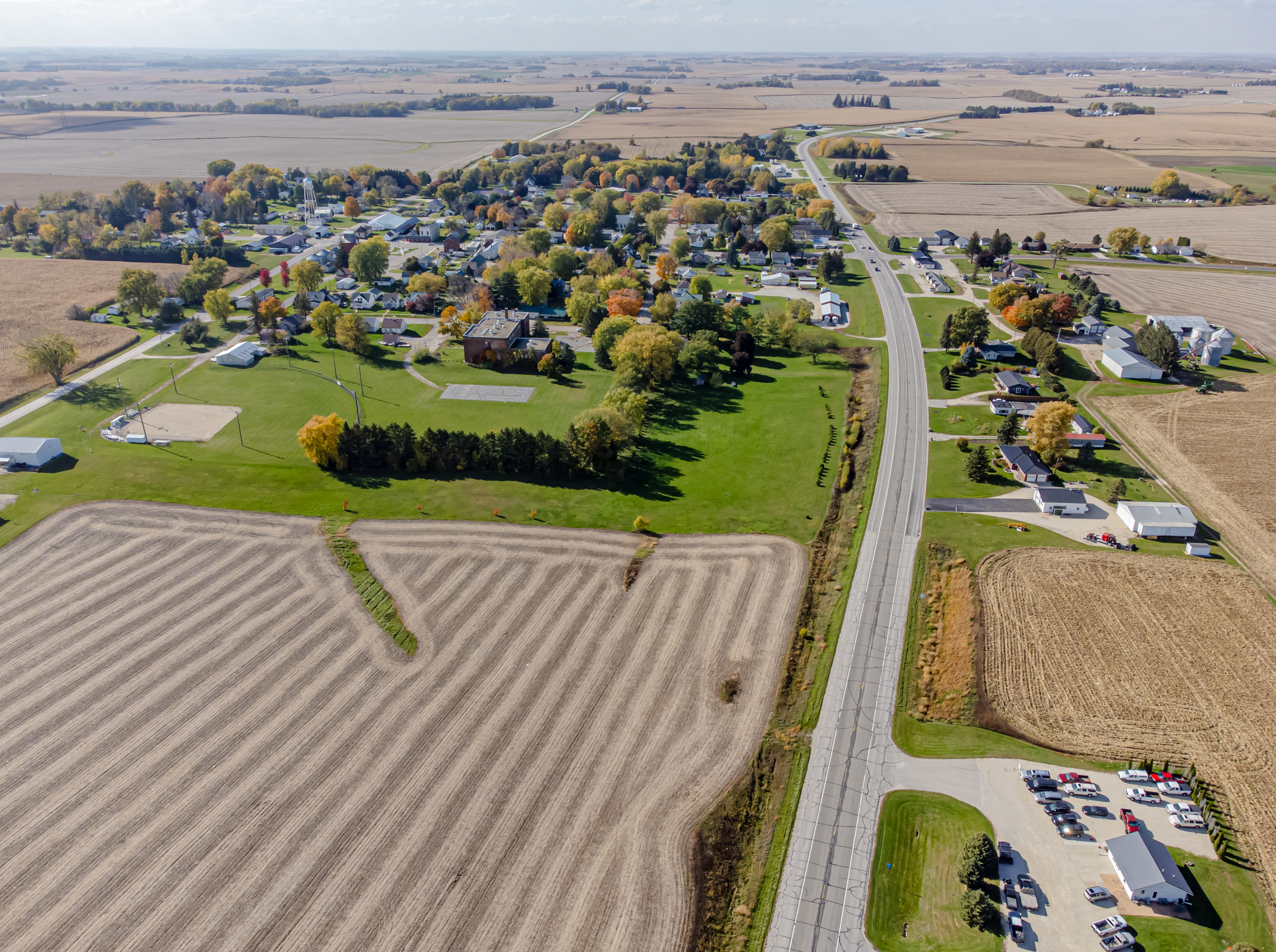
Bird's eye view of Canton

According to the United States Census Bureau, the city has a total area of 1.00 square mile (2.59 km^{2}), all land.

Canton is along U.S. Highway 52 and Fillmore County Road 21, Main Street. It is five miles east-southeast of Harmony, and nine miles west of Mabel.

== Demographics ==
Historical population
Census	Pop.	Note	%±
1890	281		—
1900	312		11.0%
1910	345		10.6%
1920	365		5.8%
1930	385		5.5%
1940	421		9.4%
1950	459		9.0%
1960	467		1.7%
1970	391		−16.3%
1980	386		−1.3%
1990	362		−6.2%
2000	343		−5.2%
2010	346		0.9%
2020	310		−10.4%
U.S. Decennial Census

=== 2010 census ===
As of the census of 2010, there were 346 people, 162 households, and 88 families living in the city. The population density was 346.0 inhabitants per square mile (133.6/km^{2}). There were 177 housing units at an average density of 177.0 per square mile (68.3/km^{2}). The racial makeup of the city was 99.7% White and 0.3% from two or more races. Hispanic or Latino of any race were 0.6% of the population.

There were 162 households, of which 25.3% had children under the age of 18 living with them, 43.2% were married couples living together, 7.4% had a female householder with no husband present, 3.7% had a male householder with no wife present, and 45.7% were non-families. 40.1% of all households were made up of individuals, and 19.8% had someone living alone who was 65 years of age or older. The average household size was 2.14 and the average family size was 2.88.

The median age in the city was 43.3 years. 23.4% of residents were under the age of 18; 4.9% were between the ages of 18 and 24; 23.4% were from 25 to 44; 30.8% were from 45 to 64; and 17.3% were 65 years of age or older. The gender makeup of the city was 49.7% male and 50.3% female.

=== 2000 census ===
As of the census of 2000, there were 500 people, 437 households, and 94 families living in the city. The population density was 341.9 inhabitants per square mile (132.0/km^{2}). There were 171 housing units at an average density of 170.4 per square mile (65.8/km^{2}). The racial makeup of the city was 100.00% White. Hispanic or Latino of any race were 0.29% of the population.

There were 157 households, out of which 27.4% had children under the age of 18 living with them, 45.9% were married couples living together, 9.6% had a female householder with no husband present, and 39.5% were non-families. 33.1% of all households were made up of individuals, and 19.7% had someone living alone who was 65 years of age or older. The average household size was 2.18 and the average family size was 2.79.

In the city, the population was spread out, with 21.9% under the age of 18, 5.2% from 18 to 24, 25.4% from 25 to 44, 22.4% from 45 to 64, and 25.1% who were 65 years of age or older. The median age was 44 years. For every 100 females, there were 86.4 males. For every 100 females age 18 and over, there were 100.0 males.

The median income for a household in the city was $23,409, and the median income for a family was $25,972. Males had a median income of $22,917 versus $21,000 for females. The per capita income for the city was $14,373. About 14.9% of families and 13.2% of the population were below the poverty line, including 18.4% of those under age 18 and 19.8% of those age 65 or over.

== Education ==
Mabel-Canton Public Schools operates area public schools.

The school colors of the pre-merger Canton School were blue and gold. The first graduating class at the Canton School did so in 1914. In 1966 it consolidated into Mabel-Canton.

== See also ==
- Harmony, Minnesota
- Canton Township, Fillmore County, Minnesota
