= Mabel Public Library =

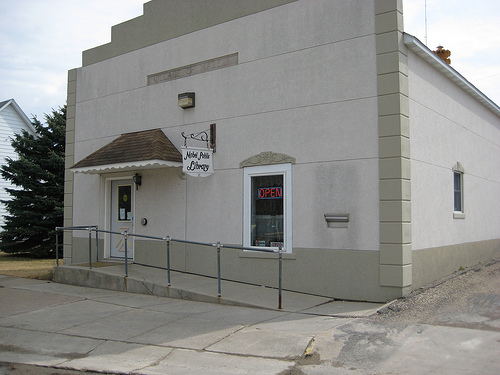
- Mabel Public Library
- 43°31′17″N 91°46′9″W
- Location: 110 East Newburg; Mabel, MN 55954-0118

Other information
- Director: Sharra Liptack
- Website: http://www.mabel.lib.mn.us/

The Mabel Public Library is a public library in Mabel, Minnesota. It is a member of Southeastern Libraries Cooperating, the SE Minnesota library region.
