= Canton station (Minnesota) =

Train station in Minnesota, United States

Canton
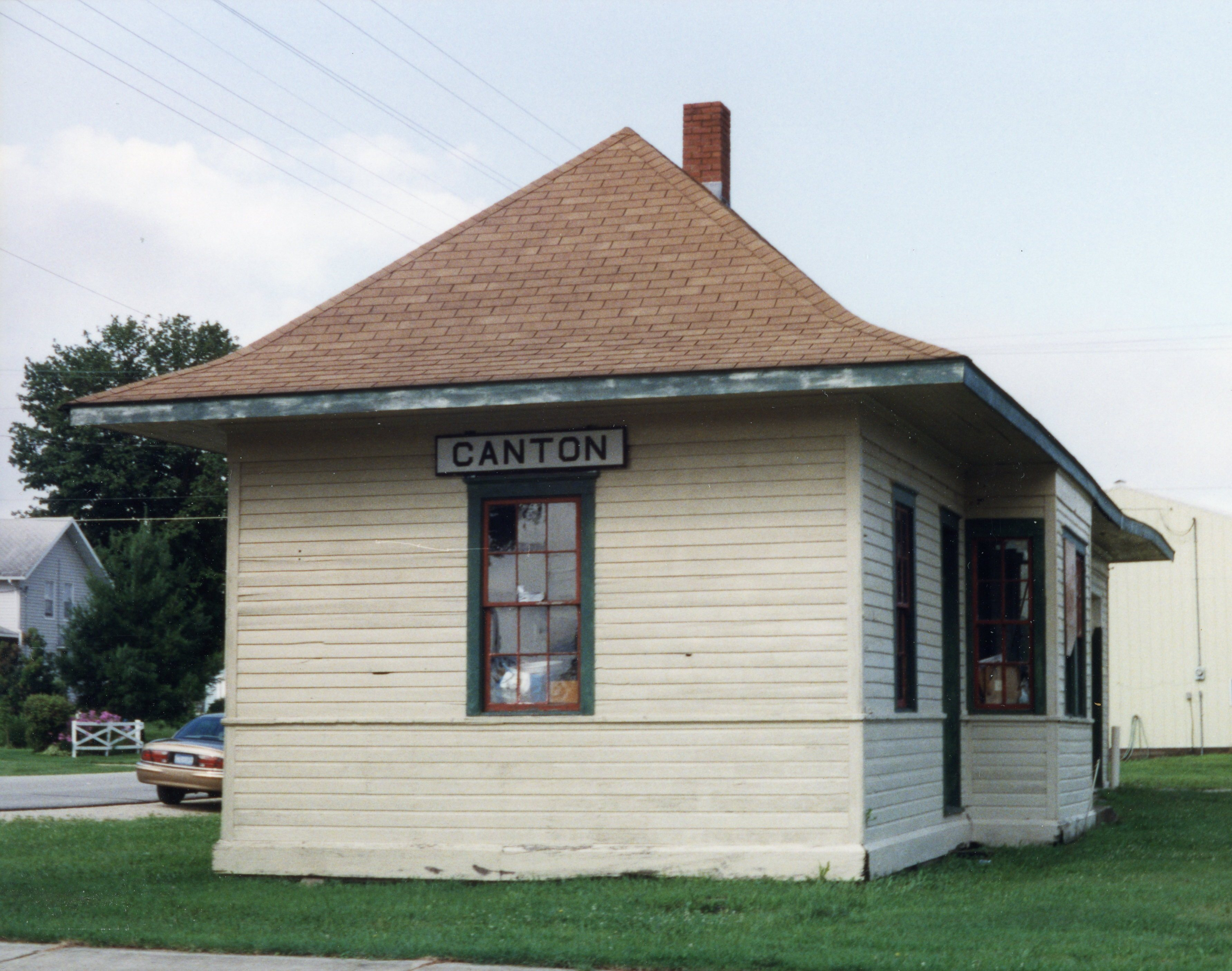
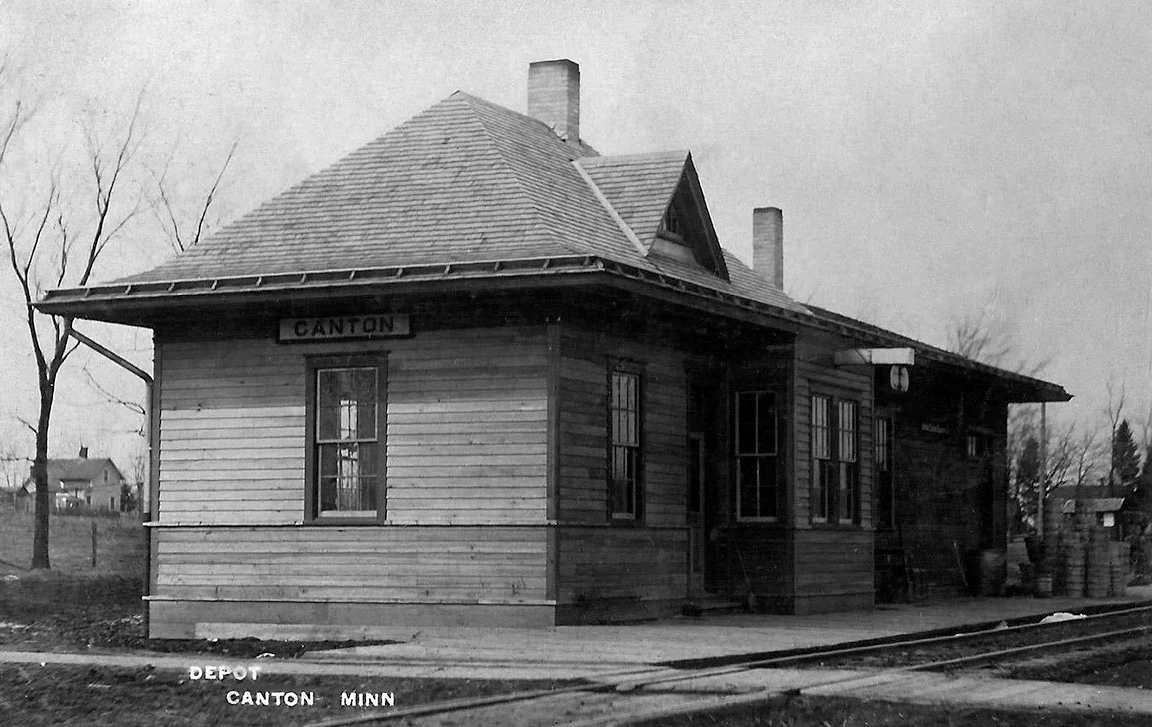
- Depot in 2017 Depot in 1908

General information
- Location: Northwest corner of West Prairie Ave. & Main St. N.
- Coordinates: 43°31′47″N 91°55′48″W
- System: Former Milwaukee Road passenger rail station

History
- Opened: 1881
- Closed: 1949

Services
| Preceding station | Milwaukee Road | Following station |
|---|---|---|
| Harmony toward Isinours | Reno – Isinours | Prosper toward Reno |
- Chicago, Milwaukee, St. Paul and Pacific Depot
- U.S. National Register of Historic Places
- Location within Minnesota Location within the United States
- Location: Canton, Minnesota
- Coordinates: 43°31′47″N 91°55′48″W
- Built: 1879
- Architect: Chicago, Milwaukee, & St. Paul R.R.
- NRHP reference No.: 100002162
- Added to NRHP: March 5, 2018
Location

The Chicago, Milwaukee, St. Paul and Pacific Depot in Canton, Minnesota, United States, is a historic railway station. It was added to the National Register of Historic Places in 2018. The depot was built in 1879 and served the community until 1949, when passenger service on this line ended. Freight service continued through the community until the line was abandoned and removed in 1977.

== History ==
In 1879, the Caledonia, Mississippi, and Western Railroad built a modest combination railroad passenger station and freight depot near the eastern boundary of Section 21 in Canton Township. By 1881, the structure was relocated to its current position, approximately three-quarters of a mile to the west at the intersection of Main Street and Prairie Avenue. The wooden, single-story building was constructed based on standardized plans provided by the railroad company. Various modifications and expansions were implemented on the depot before 1910, potentially around 1901 when the original narrow gauge railroad tracks were converted to a standard gauge. It served continuously as a hub for passenger and freight rail transportation from its inception until 1949. Later seed was sold from the building in the 1980s. However, the building fell into disuse over the years, and by 2011 was beginning to fall apart. The building was purchased by a local individual, inspiring residents of Canton formed the Canton Historical Society and begin restoring the old depot building.

== Structure ==
The structure includes a waiting room, freight room, and office. A second freight room was later added, with the possible intention of providing a separate waiting area for women from men.

The depot showcases simple Victorian-style elements that were common during that era. Adorned with wood siding, trim, and a hipped roof, the depot also boasts two brick chimneys located centrally and in alignment with the roof's ridge. To the north of the depot lies an open area where the station platform and railroad roadway once stood. Additionally, lumber storage buildings and grain elevators, erected between 1879 and 1881, are situated north and east of the site. Despite some loss of its defining features due to neglect and deterioration, the depot still maintains its fundamental integrity as a late nineteenth-century combination railroad passenger station and freight depot.

== Depot Museum ==
The building is still currently undergoing restoration and is in use as a local history museum by Canton Historical Society.

== See also ==
- List of museums in Minnesota
