= William H. Strayer (politician) =

American attorney and politician

- Oregon State Senator Bill Strayer

Member of the Oregon Senate from the 23rd district
- In office 1915–1946
- Preceded by: Claude C. McColloch
- Succeeded by: W. Austin Dunn
- Constituency: Baker County

Personal details
- Born: January 10, 1866 Freeport, Iowa, U.S.
- Died: October 18, 1946 (aged 80) Baker, Oregon, U.S.
- Party: Democratic
- Spouse: Donna Nevada Holcolm
- Profession: Lawyer

William Henry Strayer (January 10, 1866 – October 18, 1946) was an American attorney and politician from the state of Oregon. He served in the Oregon State Senate from 1915 through 1946, representing Baker County. Throughout his long service as a state senator, he was part of a small minority of Democrats elected to the Oregon Senate.

He was the only Democrat in the Oregon State Senate during the 1921 and 1931 legislative sessions. When he died in office, Strayer had served longer in the Oregon legislature than any other citizen in the state's history. Today, Strayer is the second-longest-serving legislator in Oregon history.

== Early life ==
Strayer was born in Freeport, Iowa, on January 10, 1866, the son of George and Mary Strayer. As a young man, he worked as a farm hand and later taught school in South Dakota and Illinois before being accepted into Northern Indiana University. He graduated from the university in 1889 with a law degree. He was later admitted to the Illinois bar.

Strayer moved to Oregon in 1896, settling in the Eagle Valley near Richland, where he published the Eagle Valley News. He met Donna Nevada Holcolm in Richland. He married her in Boise, Idaho, on August 19, 1895. Together they had two children, a son and a daughter.

In 1898, Strayer ran for a seat in the Oregon House of Representatives as a member of the People's Party, a populist political movement that supported Oregon Governor Sylvester Pennoyer. Strayer was endorsed by the La Grande Observer newspaper. However, he finished last in a four-person race, receiving only 99 votes.

In 1903, Strayer was admitted to the Oregon bar and moved to Baker, Oregon, to open a law practice. He served as the Baker city attorney and later the Baker County prosecutor. He was also elected to the local school board. After arriving in Baker, Strayer joined a number of civic and fraternal groups including Moose, Masons, and Shriners lodges. He remained a practicing attorney in Baker for the rest of his life, a total of 42 years.

== State senator (1915–1923) ==
In 1914, Strayer announced he would run for the District 23 seat in the Oregon State Senate as a Democrat. At that time, District 23 represented Baker County in northeastern Oregon. He was unopposed in the Democratic primary while two Republicans filed for the District 23 position. Strayer faced Frank B. Mitchell in the general election. Strayer won the general election by a margin of 519 votes. The final result was 2,399 votes for Strayer and 1,880 votes going to Mitchell.

Strayer took his seat in the Oregon State Senate on January 11, 1915, representing District 23. He worked through the 1915 regular legislative session that ended on February 20. He was one of only two Democratic senators seated in the 30-member senate that session. During the session, he served on the county affairs and alcoholic traffic committees.

Because Oregon senate terms are for four-years, Strayer did not have to run for re-election prior to the 1917 legislative session. The session opened on January 8. He was one of five Democrats in the senate that session. Nevertheless, he was appointed to the powerful ways and means committee. He also served on the alcoholic traffic, insurance, mining, and revisions of laws committees. The session ended on February 19.

In 1918, Strayer ran for re-election. He was the only Democrat to file for the District 23 seat. In addition, no Republicans entered the race, so he was unopposed in both the Democratic primary and the general election.

The 1919 legislative session began on January 13. He was one of three Democrats in the state senate that session. During the session, Strayer was appointed to the ways and means, alcoholic traffic, insurance, mining, and revisions of laws committees. The session lasted six weeks, ending on February 27. He also served in a week-long special session the following year. That special session opened on January 12, 1920, and finished business on December 17.

Since he was at the mid-point of his four-year term, Strayer did not have to run for re-election in 1920. The 1921 regular legislative session began on February 10. During this session, he served on the alcoholic traffic, industries, irrigation, public lands, and revisions of laws committees. While Strayer was the only Democrat in the Oregon State Senate that session, he introduced six bills, four of which were passed and became law. The regular session ended on February 23. He also served during a special legislative session later that year. That session began on December 19 and lasted less than a week, ending on December 24. Strayer was the only Democrat serving in the senate during the special session.

Strayer ran for re-election in 1922. He was unopposed in Democratic primary for the District 23 senate seat. In addition, no Republicans filed for the District 23 seat, so he was unopposed in both the Democratic primary and the general election.

The 1923 legislative session began on February 8. Because he was the senior senator of the four Democrats serving in that chamber, Strayer became the spokesman for the newly elected Democratic governor, Walter M. Pierce. He also served on the ways and means, enrolled bills, irrigation, and mining committees. The session lasted six weeks, ending on February 22.

== United States Senate candidate (1924) ==
In 1924, Strayer was in the middle of his four-year term, so he could run for another office without losing his state senate seat. He decided to run for the United States Senate. His campaign slogan was: Only by spending less money can the cost of government be reduced. During the campaign, Strayer was endorsed by Governor Pierce.

Strayer ran on his record as a fiscal conservative and small-government Democrat. In the state senate, he often voted against popular programs that he thought cost taxpayers too much money. These included appropriations for the University of Oregon medical school and state libraries. During his years in the legislature, he also voted against numerous bills that he believed unnecessarily extended the power and influence of state agencies. In the four-way race for the Democratic nomination, Strayer ran a close second behind Milton A. Miller of Portland. In the primary to nominate the Democratic party's United States senate candidate, Miller got 10,932 votes versus Strayer's 10,566. The other two candidates ran further behind; George Mansfield received 8,605 votes, while W. R. King trailed the field with 8,101 votes.

== State senator (1925–1933) ==
After losing his bid for the United States Senate, Strayer continued his service in the state senate. The regular 1925 legislative session began on January 12. As in the 1923 legislative session, he was one of four Democrats with a seat in the state senate. During the session he was appointed to the ways and means, livestock, mining, municipal affairs, enrolled bills, and revision of laws committees. The six-week session ended on February 26.

In 1926, another United States Senate seat was open, and Strayer was discussed in the media as a possible Democratic candidate. However, the state senate seat in District 23 was also up for election. Strayer could file as a candidate in only one race. He chose to defend his District 23 seat. Ultimately, no Democrats entered the District 23 race, and no Republican filed to run against Strayer either, leaving him unopposed in both the Democratic primary and the general election.

The 1927 regular session opened for legislative business on January 11. Strayer was one of three Democrats in the senate that session. He served on the ways and means, forestry, irrigation, enrolled bills, and revision of laws committees. The session lasted six and a half weeks, ending on February 25.

Since Strayer was in the middle of his four-year term, he did not have to run for re-election in 1928. The 1929 legislative session began on January 14. Even though Strayer was one of only three Democrats in the senate, he was still appointed chairman of engrossed and enrolled bills committee. He was also a member of the ways and means, country and state affairs, irrigation, mining, and revision of laws committees. The session lasted seven weeks, ending on March 4.

Strayer ran for re-election in 1930. He was unopposed in both the Democratic primary and the general election.

During the 1931 legislative session, Strayer was the only Democrat seated in the Oregon State Senate. Nevertheless, the Republican senate president appointed Strayer chairman of two committees, the mining committee and engrossed and enrolled bills committee. He also served on the ways and means, country and state affairs, and revisions of laws committees. The session opened on January 12 and lasted seven weeks, ending on March 6.

Strayer had another mid-term election pass in 1932. The 1933 legislature began with a special session from January 3 to 7. That special session focused on balancing the state's budget. A proposal to create a state sales tax was defeated, and budget cuts were imposed instead. The short special session was followed by the 1933 regular session which began on January 9. As a Democrat, Strayer was in a small minority in the senate. Nevertheless, the Republican senate president appointed him chairman of engrossed and enrolled bill committee. He was also appointed to the ways and means, irrigation and drainage, mining, resolutions, and revision of laws committees. Later that year, Strayer served in a second special session which opened on November 20 and lasted two weeks, ending on December 9.

== State senator (1934–1941) ==
Strayer announce his decision to seek re-election in early 1934. He had no opposition in the Democratic primary and was unopposed in the general election as well.

The 1935 legislative session began on January 14. While Strayer was still in the minority, the Republican senate president appointed him chairman of two committees, the mining committee and the engrossed and enrolled bills committee. He also served on the ways and means, rules, country and state officers, resolutions, and revision of laws committees during the session. The session lasted eight weeks, ending on March 13. Later that year, Strayer participated in a two-and-a-half-week special session that ran from October 21 through November 9.

Strayer did not have to run for re-election in 1936 since he was at the mid-point of his four-year term. The 1937 regular session opened on January 11. While he was still in the minority, Strayer continued as chairman of two senate committees, the mining committee and the engrossed and enrolled bills committee.

He was also a member of the ways and means, rules, resolutions, unemployment relief, and revision of laws committees. The session ended on March 8, after eight weeks. A few days after the legislative session ended, Governor Charles H. Martin appointed Strayer to the oversight board for the newly formed Oregon Department of Geology and Mineral Industries. When the board was organized, Strayer was selected board chairman.

In 1938, Strayer filed for re-election to his District 23 senate seat. No Democratic candidates filed to run for the seat nor did any Republicans, so he was unopposed in both the primary and the general election.

The 1939 legislative session began on January 9. While he was still in the minority, the senate's Republican president re-appointed Strayer chairman of the engrossed and enrolled bills committee and vice chairman of the senate's mining committee. In addition, he also served on the ways and means, rules, resolutions, and revision of laws committees. Strayer was also named a member of the legislature's special committee on social security. The session lasted just over nine weeks, ending on March 15.

Strayer had another mid-term election pass in 1940. The 1941 legislature began on January 13. Still a member of the small Democratic minority, he maintained good relations with the senate's Republican leadership and was re-appointed chairman of engrossed and enrolled bills committee and vice chairman of the senate's mining committee.

He was also a member of the ways and means, rules, and revision of laws committees. The session lasted for almost nine weeks, ending on March 15. A month after the legislative session ended, Strayer was re-appointed to the governing board of the state's department of geology and mineral industries.

== State senator (1942–1946) ==
In 1942, Strayer filed for re-election. Again, he had no competition in either the Democratic primary of the general election. Because he was unopposed for re-election, Strayer actively campaigned for Democratic Congressman (and former governor) Walter M. Pierce, who represented Oregon's 2nd congressional district.

The 1943 legislative session was unusual. The session opened on January 11. While there were only three Democrats in the Oregon State Senate that session, the chamber could not agree on a senate president. As the senior member of the senate, Strayer presided over the leadership debate. There were two Republicans competing for the senate president position. Senator William H. Steiwer of Fossil had 15 supporters, while Senator Dorothy McCullough Lee of Portland also had 15 supporters.

As a result, there was a succession of 44 tie votes, before Lee withdrew from the race on condition that committee appointments be made jointly with Strayer breaking the tie if Steiwer and Lee disagreed on any specific appointment. Steiwer was elected senate president on the 45th ballot. Together Steiwer and Lee made the committee appointments as agreed. Strayer was appointed chairman of the engrossed and enrolled bills committee. He was also given a seat on the ways and means, rules, mining, resolutions, and revision of laws committees. The session finished on March 10.

Since he was at the middle of his four-year term, Strayer did not have to run for re-election in 1944. The 1945 legislative session began on January 8 with Strayer once again serving in the senate's small Democratic minority. During the session, he served as chairman of engrossed and enrolled bills committee and vice chairman of rules committee.

He was also a member of ways and means, mining, resolutions, and revision of laws committees. Near the end of the legislature session, Strayer was re-appointed as chairman of the state department of geology and mineral industries oversight board, a position he had held since the board was established. The session lasted almost ten weeks, ending on March 17.

In early 1946, Strayer filed for re-election to his senate seat in District 23. Once again, he was unopposed in the Democratic primary, and he won the Republican primary with write-in votes. As a result, he was unopposed in the general election.

However, during the year a court case arose that questioned whether individuals serving on state boards and commission could concurrently serve in the state legislature. While Strayer was not specifically identified in the legal proceedings, as the chairman of the state's oversight board for the department of geology and mineral industries, the outcome of the case could have affected his ability to serve in the legislature.

After the judge excluded Strayer from the pending case, a separate case was filed to prevent him from serving concurrently on the mining board and in the state legislature. After nine months of litigation, the court ruled that members of the legislature could not hold concurrent state administrative positions. It was expected that Strayer and the other two state senators affected by the decision would appeal to the Oregon Supreme Court. However, Strayer died less than a month after the decision, so no appeal was filed on his behalf.

== Death and legacy ==
Strayer died on October 18, 1946, in Baker, Oregon. He experienced a stroke ten days prior to his death and never recovered. He was buried in the Strayer family plot at Mount Hope Cemetery in Baker. His funeral was attended by six state senators representing Governor Earl Snell and the Oregon State Senate.

Strayer had served in the Oregon State Senate for 32 years. When he died, he was finishing his eighth four-year term in the senate. That made him the longest-serving legislator in Oregon history at that time. Today, Strayer is the second-longest-serving legislator in Oregon history.

On January 20, 1947, the Oregon State Senate passed a resolution honoring the service of Strayer and four other former senators who had died since the close of the 1945 legislative session.
