= Mabel-Canton Public Schools =

School district in Mabel, Minnesota

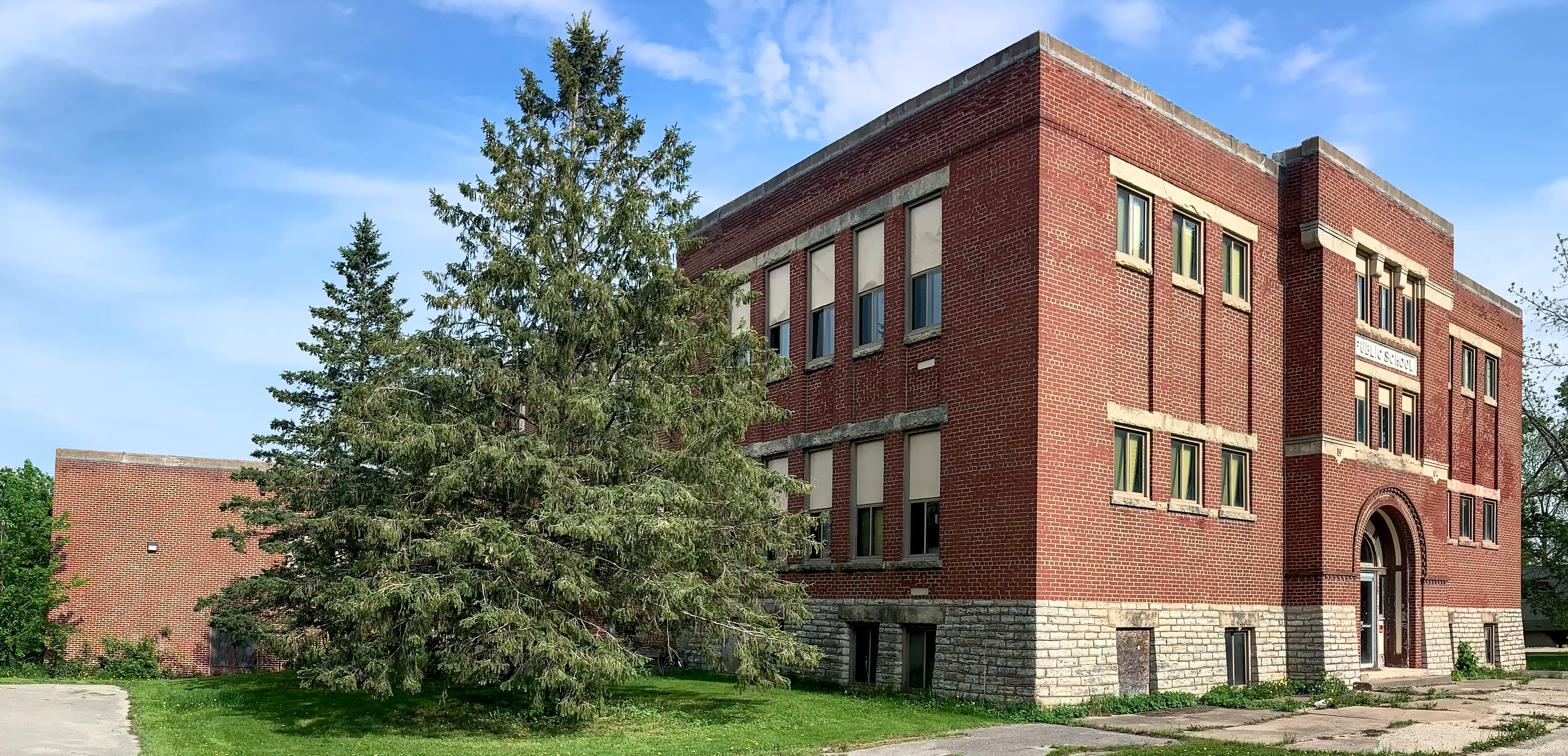
Public school in Canton

Mabel-Canton Public Schools (MC I.S.D. #238) is a school district headquartered in Mabel, Minnesota. The district, which also serves Canton, has a single campus with all grades, K-12.

It includes sections of Fillmore County and Houston County. It also has an agreement with the Decorah Community School District to take students from parts of Winneshiek County, Iowa.

As of 2018 the district had a total of about 280 students. Another school district document circa 2020 gave the enrollment count as 283. The area of the district is 116.42 square miles (301.5 km^{2}).

== History ==
On July 1, 1966, the consolidated school district, a merger of the Mabel and Canton schools, opened. The district began using blue and white as school colors, with one each from a predecessor district. Red is used as an "accent color".

In 2001 the North Winneshiek Community School District ended its high school program. That year it entered into an agreement with Mabel-Canton Schools to allow students from its boundary to attend the Mabel-Canton high school program.

In 2018 the combined interim board of Decorah Community School District and North Winneshiek district in Iowa approved an agreement with Mabel-Canton, effective for five years, to allow students in the former North Winneshiek district boundary to attend Mabel-Canton if they choose. Decorah CSD had absorbed North Winneshiek CSD effective July 1, 2018. The agreement applies to any post-merger resident of Decorah CSD who is geographically closer to Mabel than to Decorah, Iowa, where all Decorah CSD campuses are located. In April 2019 the Mabel-Canton district anticipated that an additional 15-20 students from North Winn would begin attending Mabel-Canton in the start of the subsequent school year.

In 2018 the Minnesota Legislature gave the district $433,500 to improve the security of its campus. This was in response to a wave of school shootings occurring elsewhere in the country.

== Campus ==
The school gymnasium has the logos of the two predecessor districts and of the North Winneshiek district. Phil Richert, a former North Winneshiek board member, donated the North Winneshiek logo in a period prior to 2020, inspiring the Mabel-Canton leadership to get the other two.
