= Mabel, Minnesota =

City in Minnesota, United States

Mabel
- City
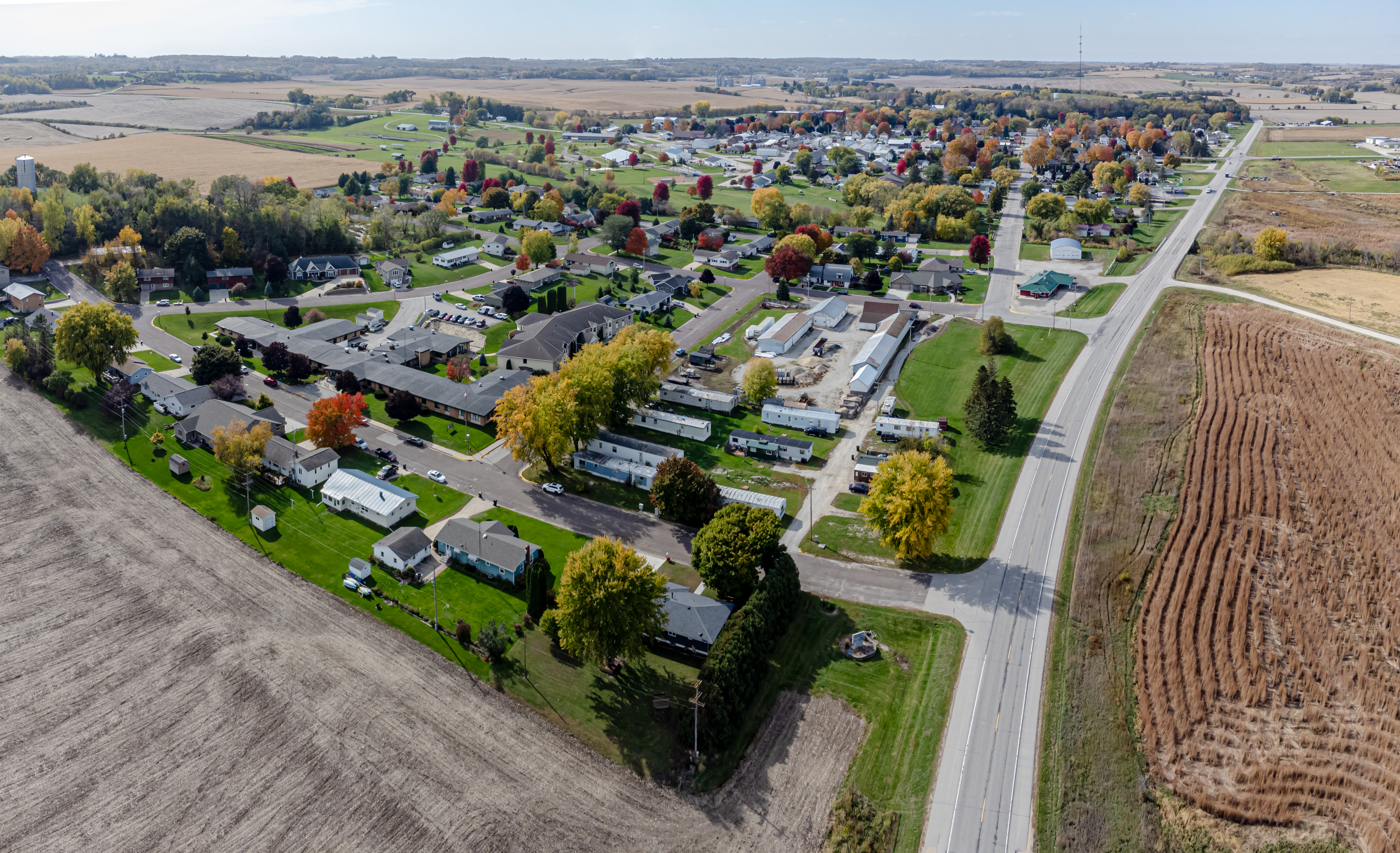
- MN-44 and Mn-43 junction in town

- Location of Mabel, Minnesota
- Coordinates: 43°31′11″N 91°46′05″W
- Country: United States
- State: Minnesota
- County: Fillmore

Area
  - Total: 0.48 sq mi (1.25 km^{2})
  - Land: 0.48 sq mi (1.25 km^{2})
  - Water: 0 sq mi (0.00 km^{2})
- Elevation: 1,119 ft (341 m)

Population (2020)
  - Total: 716
  - Density: 1,487.7/sq mi (574.41/km^{2})
- Time zone: UTC-6 (Central (CST))
  - Summer (DST): UTC-5 (CDT)
- ZIP code: 55954
- Area code: 507
- FIPS code: 27-38888
- GNIS feature ID: 2395796
- Website: cityofmabel.com

Mabel is a city in Fillmore County, Minnesota, United States. As of the 2020 census, Mabel had a population of 716.

== History ==
A post office called Mabel has been in operation since 1880. The city was named for the daughter of a railroad official.

== Transportation ==
Minnesota State Highways 43 and 44 are two of the main routes in the community.

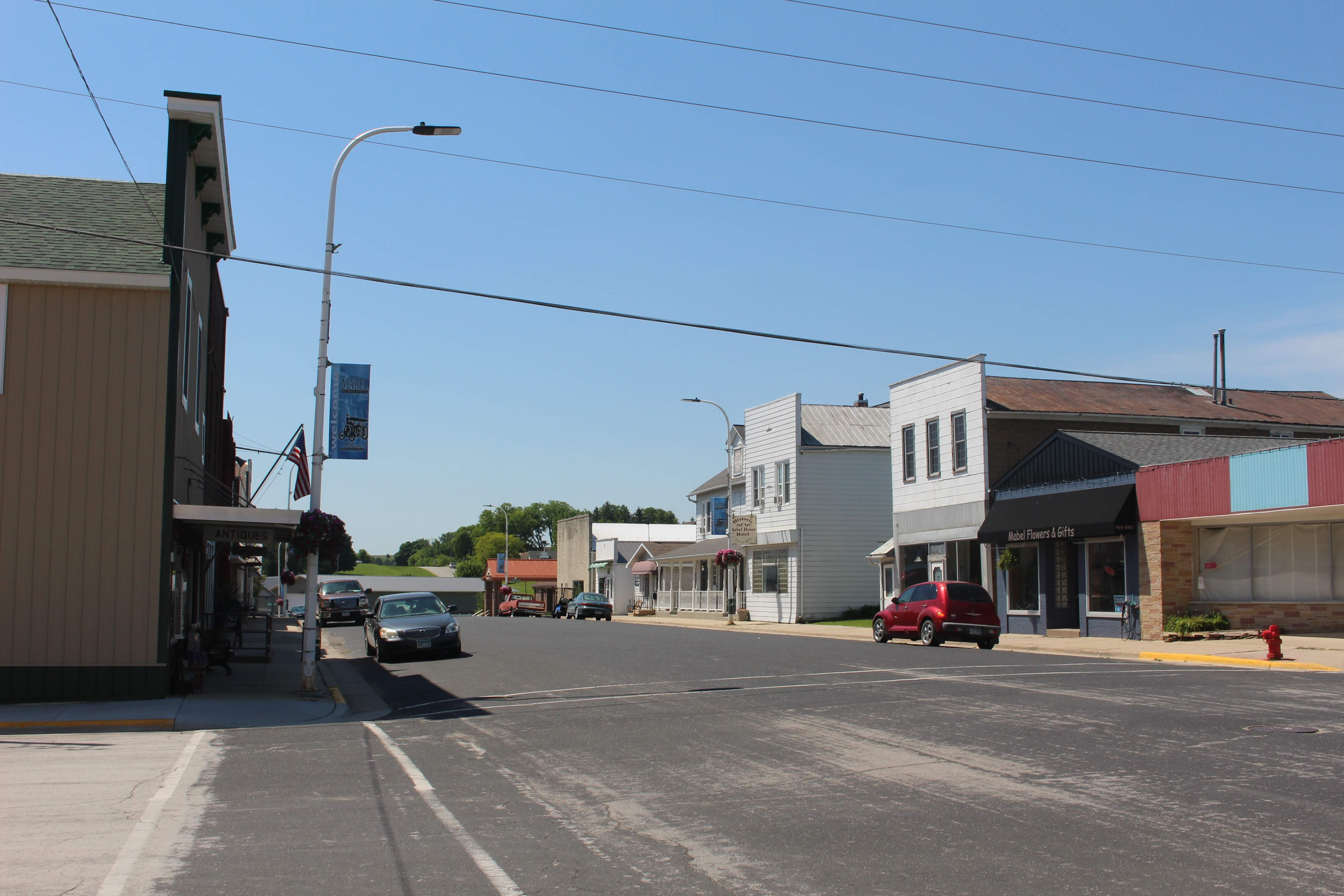
Downtown Mabel in 2018

== Geography ==
According to the United States Census Bureau, the city has a total area of 0.48 square miles (1.24 km^{2}), all land.

=== Climate ===
Climate data for Mabel, Minnesota (1991–2020)
Month	Jan	Feb	Mar	Apr	May	Jun	Jul	Aug	Sep	Oct	Nov	Dec	Year
Mean daily maximum °F (°C)	23.8 (−4.6)	27.9 (−2.3)	40.4 (4.7)	55.4 (13.0)	66.9 (19.4)	76.2 (24.6)	79.8 (26.6)	78.1 (25.6)	71.7 (22.1)	58.3 (14.6)	43.0 (6.1)	30.0 (−1.1)	54.3 (12.4)
Daily mean °F (°C)	13.9 (−10.1)	17.7 (−7.9)	30.2 (−1.0)	43.6 (6.4)	55.7 (13.2)	65.8 (18.8)	68.9 (20.5)	66.5 (19.2)	59.2 (15.1)	46.7 (8.2)	33.1 (0.6)	21.2 (−6.0)	43.5 (6.4)
Mean daily minimum °F (°C)	4.0 (−15.6)	7.4 (−13.7)	20.0 (−6.7)	31.7 (−0.2)	44.4 (6.9)	55.3 (12.9)	58.0 (14.4)	54.9 (12.7)	46.6 (8.1)	35.1 (1.7)	23.2 (−4.9)	12.4 (−10.9)	32.8 (0.4)
Average precipitation inches (mm)	1.00 (25)	1.01 (26)	1.90 (48)	3.90 (99)	4.78 (121)	6.14 (156)	4.47 (114)	4.59 (117)	4.37 (111)	3.13 (80)	1.89 (48)	1.40 (36)	38.58 (981)
Source: NOAA

== Demographics ==
Historical population
Census	Pop.	Note	%±
1890	273		—
1900	494		81.0%
1910	549		11.1%
1920	550		0.2%
1930	686		24.7%
1940	741		8.0%
1950	788		6.3%
1960	815		3.4%
1970	888		9.0%
1980	861		−3.0%
1990	745		−13.5%
2000	766		2.8%
2010	780		1.8%
2020	716		−8.2%
U.S. Decennial Census

=== 2010 census ===
As of the census of 2010, there were 780 people, 359 households, and 192 families living in the city. The population density was 1,625.0 inhabitants per square mile (627.4/km^{2}). There were 394 housing units at an average density of 820.8 per square mile (316.9/km^{2}). The racial makeup of the city was 99.0% White, 0.1% Native American, 0.1% Asian, 0.3% from other races, and 0.5% from two or more races. Hispanic or Latino of any race were 0.6% of the population.

There were 359 households, of which 21.4% had children under the age of 18 living with them, 39.6% were married couples living together, 8.6% had a female householder with no husband present, 5.3% had a male householder with no wife present, and 46.5% were non-families. 39.8% of all households were made up of individuals, and 23.4% had someone living alone who was 65 years of age or older. The average household size was 2.03 and the average family size was 2.70.

The median age in the city was 49.6 years. 19.1% of residents were under the age of 18; 6.3% were between the ages of 18 and 24; 20% were from 25 to 44; 23.2% were from 45 to 64; and 31.5% were 65 years of age or older. The gender makeup of the city was 45.8% male and 54.2% female.

=== 2000 census ===
As of the census of 2000, there were 766 people, 337 households, and 199 families living in the city. The population density was 1,618.4 inhabitants per square mile (624.9/km^{2}). There were 365 housing units at an average density of 771.2 per square mile (297.8/km^{2}). The racial makeup of the city was 99.09% White, 0.13% from other races, and 0.78% from two or more races. Hispanic or Latino of any race were 0.65% of the population.

There were 337 households, out of which 20.2% had children under the age of 18 living with them, 48.4% were married couples living together, 7.7% had a female householder with no husband present, and 40.9% were non-families. 37.7% of all households were made up of individuals, and 24.3% had someone living alone who was 65 years of age or older. The average household size was 2.09 and the average family size was 2.72.

In the city, the population was spread out, with 20.1% under the age of 18, 5.1% from 18 to 24, 18.8% from 25 to 44, 20.4% from 45 to 64, and 35.6% who were 65 years of age or older. The median age was 51 years. For every 100 females, there were 82.4 males. For every 100 females age 18 and over, there were 78.9 males.

The median income for a household in the city was $27,228, and the median income for a family was $35,227. Males had a median income of $25,625 versus $16,442 for females. The per capita income for the city was $15,496. About 8.5% of families and 10.7% of the population were below the poverty line, including 18.6% of those under age 18 and 10.6% of those age 65 or over.

== Education ==
Mabel-Canton Public Schools operates area public schools.

The school colors of the pre-merger Mabel School were purple and white. The first graduating class at the Mabel School did so in 1903. In 1966 it consolidated into Mabel-Canton.

== Notable people ==
- Douglas K. Amdahl, Chief Justice of the Minnesota Supreme Court
- Daniel Knuth, Minnesota state representative, environmental consultant, and educator
- Lew Larson, Minnesota state senator

== See also ==
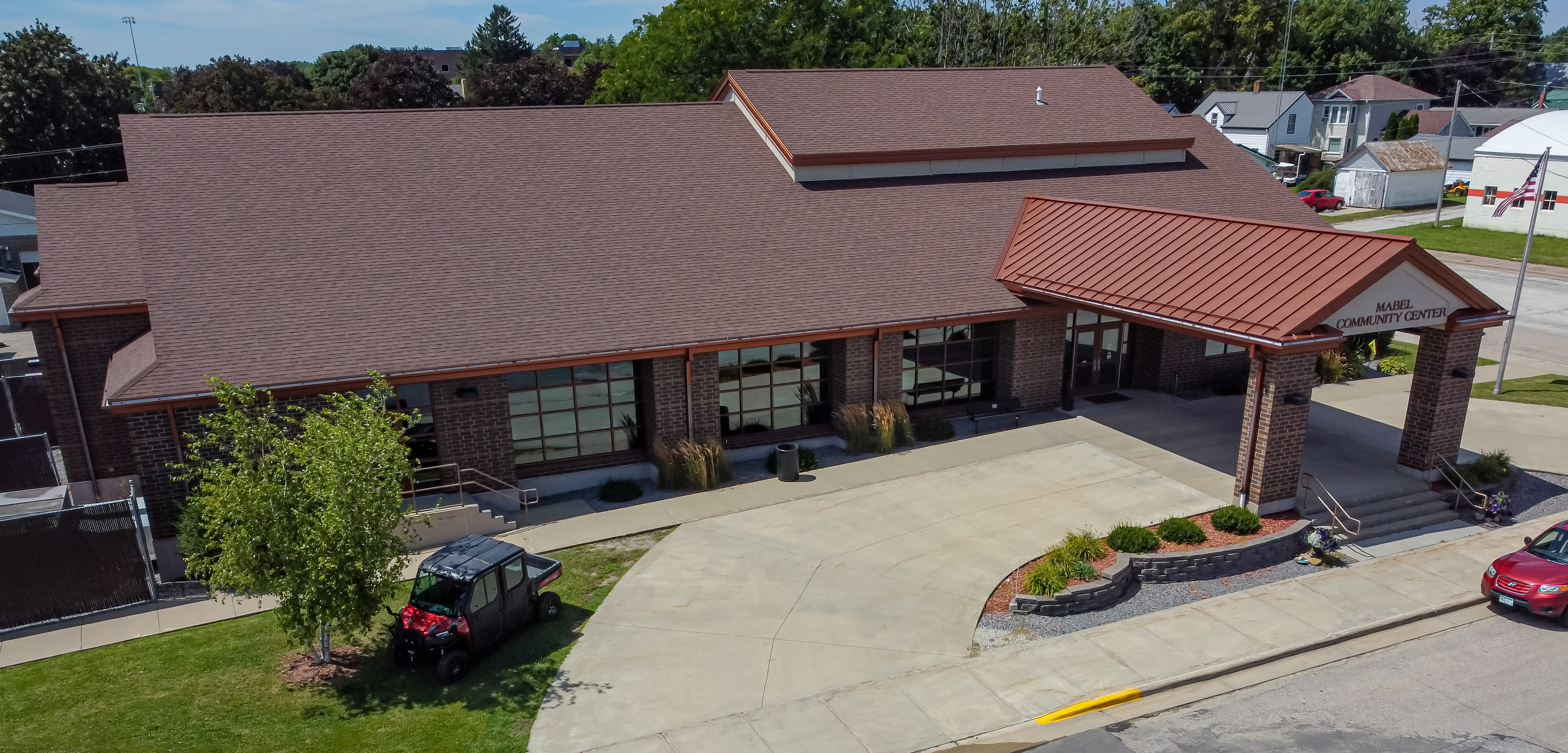
Mabel City Hall

- Mabel Public Library
- Canton, Minnesota
