= Albert F. Yeager =

American horticulturalist (1892–1961)

- Albert F. Yeager examining tomato plants, North Dakota State University
- Born: 1892; Kansas, United States
- Died: November 4, 1961 (aged 68–69); Fort Myers, Florida
- Education: Bachelor's of Science Master's of Horticulture Ph.D. in Horticulture
- Alma mater: Kansas Agricultural College Oregon Agricultural College Iowa State College
- Known for: Fruit and vegetable cultivar production
- Spouse: Arline Yeager
- Children: Mary Yeager Albert Yeager Jr.
- Scientific career
- Fields: Horticulture
- Thesis: (1936)

Albert Franklin Yeager (1892 – November 4, 1961) was an American horticulturalist. From his work developing hardy vegetables and fruits at the North Dakota Agricultural College (NDAC) and the North Dakota Agricultural Experiment Station (NDAES), he was known as the "plant wizard of the north" and the "Luther Burbank of North Dakota."

== Early life and education ==
Born in Kansas in 1892, Yeager earned his bachelor's degree from Kansas Agricultural College in 1912 and then a horticulture master's degree in pomology at Oregon Agricultural College in 1916. He later in 1936 finished his Ph.D. at Iowa State College at the urging of his university superior.

== Academic career ==
Yeager's earliest job came about just after he received his bachelor's degree and the creation of the Pennsylvania Chestnut Blight Commission, which he became a field agent for in 1913. Then he went on to teach vocational agriculture classes at Crete High School from 1914 to 1915 before completing his graduate level degree. From 1916 to 1918, he taught classes in horticulture and pomology at Pennsylvania State University. Yeager first joined the staff of North Dakota State University as a horticulturalist in 1919, along with becoming a part of the college's Experiment Station (NDAES). He served in this position until 1937, during which he was frequently an article writer for the horticultural bulletin publication whenever a new cultivar had been developed. The main focus of his research during this time period was developing crop cultivars resistant to early snap frosts, droughts, and lengthy cold temperatures, which were all conditions important to farmers in the state. He determined that frosts were of the greatest concern in killing crop fields and so sought to make cultivars of tomatoes and corn with higher resistance to sudden extreme lower temperatures.

By 1934, Yeager was promoted to the position of head of the Horticulture and Forestry Department at the university. Additionally, he founded the local Fargo Garden Society and was active in the North Dakota Horticultural Society as its secretary. The onset of the 1930s and the Great Depression saw funds for the university and Yeager's research diminish, limiting his productive output and removing his research assistants. A 25-year-long conflict between the university and the state government came to a head in 1937 in an incident called "the purge", where the state governor William Langer accused multiple faculty at the university of communist ties, due to them having been criticizing the state budget cuts and Langer's other demands of the university. In a matter of days in July and August of that year, seven faculty were removed from their positions and replaced with loyalists to Langer and the state government. While Yeager was not affected by this incident, he was concerned about the ongoing budget cuts to scientific research and what had happened among the faculty, resulting in him resigning on September 30, 1937.

Both the President, John West, and Dean, Archibald Minard, of the university tried to convince Yeager to return to his position with his full research space and funding provided and protected against future decreases. They even went so far as to make a newspaper editorial appeal calling for Langer and the Board of Administration to also support Yeager's reinstatement, but they did not respond and Yeager refused to return to his faculty job. Multiple other universities and organizations sent him their own job offers, but Yeager instead applied to and received an offer at Michigan State University. But before he and his family moved away from Fargo, Yeager released a highly critical editorial of his own in The Forum, debasing the university for the lack of support of its employees and of allowing "some politician" to hold sway over its activities. Yeager remained at Michigan State for several years, before taking a Horticultural Department head position at the University of New Hampshire in 1939, where he would stay until his retirement in 1959. When he returned to visit Fargo in 1951, The Forum heralded him as "North Dakota's Luther Burbank".

From 1948 onward, Yeager also acted as a horticulture consultant for the Beechnut Packing Company. After his retirement, Yeager continued independent horticultural research while working alongside Henry A. Wallace.

== Horticultural research and activities ==
=== Corn cultivation ===
The research of H. O. Werner as the university horticulturalist before him served as the template for Yeager's work, and he aimed to create a cultivar of sweet corn that was better than even the Golden Bantam, the most popular variety at the time. Making attempts at hybridization with Gill's Early Market variety, he finally succeeded in creating a worthwhile enough cross in 1923, though had to go through another round of replantings to have enough seed in 1924 to send out to farmers for testing in the 1925 season. It took another year until 1926 when he had worked out some additional negative traits from the cultivar, allowing him to then officially announce the new Sunshine variety of sweet corn. The farmer testing that year proved successful, and the cultivar was listed in the seed catalog for 1927 published by Oscar H. Will & Company.

=== Tomato cultivation ===
At the same time as his corn research, Yeager was doing research into tomatoes and how to extend Werner's work in creating a tomato, which is normally a warm-weather fruit that requires large amounts of sunlight, that could grow successfully in North Dakota without requiring the involvement of a specialist. Yeager, however, was less positive about the potential of improvement, as even the popular national variety with cold resistance at the time, the Earliana, did not reach fruiting early enough for the especially early frosts that occur in the state. An attempt on his part in the 1920s resulted in a hybrid cross of the Earliana with the Sunrise tomato from England; the new resultant variety was named Red River and opened for cultivation in 1925. It was not good enough for what Yeager was desiring, however, and multiple further cultivars would be released, including the Agassiz and the Early Jumbo.

It was not until 1929 and his production of the Bison tomato that Yeager decided he had made a satisfactory early-growing tomato. It was officially released that same year. In a comparative study he conducted in 1931 against 26 other cultivars, the Bison tomato produced 50 percent more fruit than the other cultivars by the endpoint. By 1933, the Bison tomato had become the most planted tomato cultivar in the region. Due to the tomato being one of the few determinate cultivars produced at the time that grew fruit on the end of each vine, there was criticism of the cultivar by other scientists that claimed the hardier variety would not be necessary or wanted outside of the colder states. This would be upended throughout the 1930s though as determinate tomatoes became a highly desired cultivar in states like California. An additional tomato cultivar of Yeager's, the Farthest North, would become the dominant tomato in Costa Rica over the next two decades.

Another tomato improvement that Yeager aimed for was a nutritionally improved cultivar due to the high amount of vitamin A and vitamin C in tomatoes. He was able to create the Doublerich cultivar with double the vitamin C than other tomatoes during his time at the university, but it was not released for farmers until 1947, after he had left his position there. He also worked on cultivars that are more ornamental in nature, with the Window Box cultivar being released in 1945 that featured a small 18 inches (460 mm) in height, a single fruiting stem, and bunches of tomatoes that were each between 1 and 2 inches (25 and 51 mm) in diameter.

=== Winter squash cultivation ===
Another crop that Yeager began investigating was sweet potatoes thanks to their high nutrient levels, but determined that the growing season of North Dakota was too short for any hybrid cultivar or other trait improvement to overcome. So he turned to winter squash instead in 1922 and worked until 1925 with the cultivar Quality. He failed, however, to find more than a single desirable trait and found out that even that single one was due to an accidental hybridization with the Essex Hybrid cultivar. This difference interested him though, and he abandoned his other squash research to focus on this new hybrid, creating a new cultivar in 1927 called the Buttercup squash. He was convinced of its improvement over the general Hubbard cultivar after his final testing in 1931, and he eventually released the Buttercup for general farming in 1932.

=== Melon cultivation ===
Yeager's early work at the University of New Hampshire starting from 1936 focused on producing minuscule "midget" watermelons for easier public consumption. The first success was the creation of the White Mountain cultivar in 1943, but it had the unfortunate additional trait of producing white seeds. This made it unsellable due to that feature generally implying unripeness in other watermelons, which would put off customers from purchasing it. He ultimately triumphed in 1950 in making the New Hampshire Midget cultivar, which was a hybrid cross of the Dakota Sweet from Russia and the Favorite Honey from Japan. It was described as being sweet and having a small rind that made disposal easy. The New Hampshire Midget went on to be entered into the All-America Selections and won the 1951 gold medal for approval as a garden crop.

Next for his research, Yeager collaborated in 1951 with fellow pomologist Elwyn Meader to create a new watermelon cultivar named the Golden Midget, which was a hybrid made by crossing the New Hampshire Midget with an Oklahoma variety named the Pumpkin Rind. It took over a year and multiple generational trials to make the recessive golden rind consistent and to have other traits that allowed the melon to grow within 70 days. The Golden Midget was first released for public consumption in 1952, and by April 1953 more than 2,000 acres (8.1 km^{2}) in Florida and over 1,000 acres (4.0 km^{2}) in Cuba were devoted to growing the cultivar. It was especially popular for its small size, which led to it being referred to as a "refrigerator" or "ice box" watermelon.

=== Bulletin publications ===
The agricultural experiment stations and their researchers were tasked with releasing periodic bulletins on farming and horticultural practices and methodologies, either generally or for specific crops. This was also true for Yeager and the station at North Dakota State University. Some of the first bulletins he published include Control of Garden and Household Insects in 1921 and Shelterbelts for North Dakota that same year. These general topic bulletins would lead to ones on the plants he had been breeding, with one on his Sunshine Sweet Corn and also his Buttercup Squash. A broader, but focused bulletin titled Fruit Culture in North Dakota was published in 1925 and covered all the necessities for obtaining and planting various fruit trees and bushes in the state and how to arrange a fruit garden. Another bulletin called Tomato Breeding was released in 1933 and discussed similar methods.

== Awards and fellowships ==
The Canada-based Stevenson Memorial Gold Medal was awarded to Yeager in 1954 for his horticultural achievements. The 1956 Robinson Gold Medal was also awarded to him for the same accomplishments. Lastly he was, in 1957, given the highest award of the American Pomological Society, the Wilder Medal.

Yeager was a fellow for a number of distinguished societies, including the American Society for Horticultural Science, the American Association for the Advancement of Science, the American Institute of Biological Sciences, and the American Society of Plant Physiologists.

== Personal life ==
Yeager was married to his wife, Arline, and they had a daughter named Mary. They also had a son in 1928 named Albert Jr. He died at his home in Fort Myers, Florida, on November 4, 1961, at the age of 69.

Throughout his academic work, he became friends with several other notable individuals, including the owner of the Bismarck seed company George Will, the "Flower Lady of North Dakota" Fannie Mahood Heath, and fellow researcher from Canada W. Russ Leslie.

== Bibliography ==
- —; Heath, Fannie Mahood (1923). Perennial Flowers for North Dakota Homes. North Dakota Agricultural College.
- — (1950). Breeding Improved Horticultural Plants: Vegetables I. University of New Hampshire.
