= Meader =

Meader is a surname. Notable people with the surname include:

- David Meader (born 1949), American politician
- Elwyn Meader (1910–1996), American plant breeder
- George Meader (1907–1994), American politician
- Herman Lee Meader (1874–1930), American architect and author
- Mary Meader (1916–2008), American photographer
- Stephen W. Meader (1892–1977), American novelist
- Vaughn Meader (1936–2004), American comedian, impersonator, musician, and film actor
