= Minnesota State Highway 80 =

State highway in Minnesota, United States

Trunk Highway 80
- MN 80 highlighted in red

Route information
- Maintained by MnDOT
- Length: 8.431 mi (13.568 km)
- Existed: 1949–present

Major junctions
- West end: MN 16 / CSAH 5 near Wykoff
- East end: US 52 at Fountain

Location
- Country: United States
- State: Minnesota
- Counties: Fillmore

Highway system
- Minnesota Trunk Highway System; Interstate; US; State; Legislative; Scenic
← MN 79	→ MN 83

Minnesota State Highway 80 (MN 80) is a two-lane 8.431-mile-long (13.568 km) highway in southeast Minnesota that runs from its intersection with State Highway 16 near Wykoff and continues east to its eastern terminus at its intersection with U.S. Highway 52 at Fountain.

== Route description ==
State Highway 80 serves as an east–west route in southeast Minnesota between Wykoff and Fountain. The route is located near the cities of Spring Valley and Preston.

The roadway passes through the Richard J. Dorer State Forest.

Highway 80 is also known as Gold Street and Front Street in Wykoff.

Legally, it is part of Constitutional Route 9 as defined in the Minnesota Statutes. However, it is not marked with this number.

== History ==
Highway 80 was established in 1949. The route was previously U.S. 16 until that designation was moved to a bypass of Wykoff and Fountain.

The route was paved (as U.S. 16) in 1940.

== Major intersections ==
The entire route is in Fillmore County.

Location	mi	km	Destinations	Notes
Fillmore Township	0.000	0.000	MN 16 / CR 5 south – Spring Valley, Preston	
Wykoff	1.030	1.658	CR 117 (South Street)	
Wykoff	1.346	2.166	CR 5 (Gold Street) north	
Fountain Township	5.241	8.435	CR 7	
Fountain	8.443	13.588	US 52 – Chatfield, Preston	
1.000 mi = 1.609 km; 1.000 km = 0.621 mi

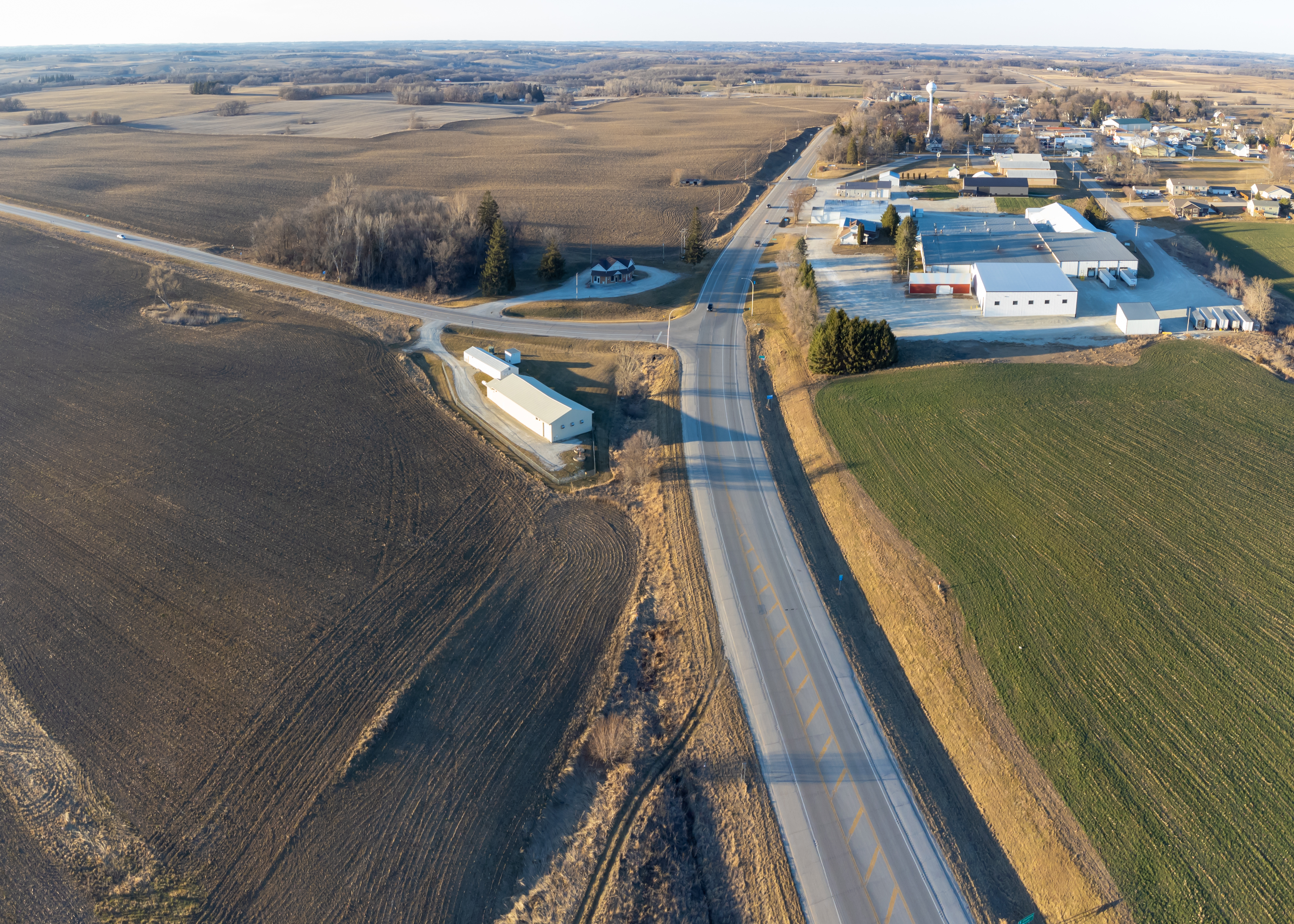
US-52 and MN-80 junction in Fountain, MN
