= Fannie Mahood Heath =

American gardener

- Born: March 5, 1864; Wykoff, Minnesota
- Died: September 29, 1931 (aged 67)
- Occupation: Gardener
- Known for: Discovering growing methods for imported plants
- Notable work: Perennial Flowers for North Dakota Homes

Fannie Mahood Heath (March 5, 1864 – September 29, 1931) was an American gardener who discovered methods for growing imported flowers. She created flower and fruit cultivars and corresponded and collaborated with academics. She was a founding member and vice-president of the National Horticultural Society and her garden would attract 100 visitors a week.

== Early life and education ==
Mahood was born in 1864 in Wykoff, Minnesota, to John and Elizabeth Mahood. Her father had been involved in the California gold rush and, while there, he had learned about the medicinal benefits of plants from the native people. This resulted in the Mahood family having a focus on growing plants and Fannie's grandmother bequeathed her a plot of land when she was seven to set up a garden. The family moved to Grand Forks, North Dakota, in 1880 and it was in 1881 at the age of 17 that she married Frank Heath. They moved to the plains west of the city and Fannie began creating a forest of trees derived from local species, including willow trees, cottonwoods, and box elders alongside her lilac bushes, in order to act as a shelterbelt.

== Career and gardening ==
After the establishment of the Heath farm, Fannie Heath focused on finding a way to neutralize the high alkalinity of the soil by applying vinegar as an acidic countermeasure. It took multiple different attempts and modifications of the soil, but she was eventually able to establish flowerbeds, vegetables and fruit trees. She corresponded with horticulturalists around the country to obtain new seeds and, while many failed to survive in the soil, she kept extensive notes on her experimentation. The flower seeds she was cultivating were sent out to her correspondents and there was a growing demand for her flowers around the world.

Heath also kept up other fields and she sent data to publications, including bird migration patterns in the plains to the official biological survey office in Washington D.C. Her messages to North Dakota State University brought her in contact with O. A. Stevens and she learned about the scientific nomenclature of plants. She had discussions with C. B. Warden about garden and shelterbelt production in the windy plains. These collaborations would eventually lead to the publication of the bulletin Perennial Flowers for North Dakota Homes with Albert F. Yeager in 1923.

An additional independent publication was made by Heath in 1924 titled Flowers From Snow To Snow On The Dakota Great Plains with a discussion on her 40 years of plant growth research and the hardiness of the 174 plant species that had been tested.

In 1920, she was involved in establishing the National Horticultural Society at the request of Hamilton Traub. The society was officially established in 1922 and Fannie was given the position of vice president. The June meeting in 1922 was hosted at the Heath farm, where Fannie gave a presentation on the topic of "Protection and Beautification of the Home Grounds" and exhibited her methods of how to successfully propagate multiple flowers from different habitats. During the November 1923 meeting of the society, the National Botanical Garden and Herbarium was established in Grand Forks and Fannie donated 250 specimens to its creation. She also joined the Great Plains Horticulture Society in 1925 after she was invited. By 1925, the four acres of the Heath farm had more than 450 different species and over 100 people a week were visiting her garden. This became too much and she ended the public tours. Her planted flowers included species from around the world, including the Asiatic globe flower, the caragana, and a variety of other shrubs from across the region of Manchuria.

== Death and legacy ==
Heath died, aged 67, on September 29, 1931. The 1933 "Century of Progress" Chicago World's Fair had an exhibit on her and her accomplishments, including a descriptive plaque calling her the "flower lady of North Dakota". A black raspberry cultivar she developed would later be named in her honor.

A collection of her papers, writings, notes, photographs, and newspaper clippings was created at the University of North Dakota after donations in 2000 by her daughter, Pearl Heath Frazier.

== Personal life ==
During their marriage, Heath and her husband had two children: a son named Frank and a daughter named Pearl. Her son died in 1902.

== Bibliography ==
- —; Yeager, Albert F. (1923). Perennial Flowers for North Dakota Homes. North Dakota Agricultural College.
- — (February 1924). "Flowers From Snow To Snow On The Dakota Great Plains". Garden & Home Builder. 38. Doubleday: 224–225.
