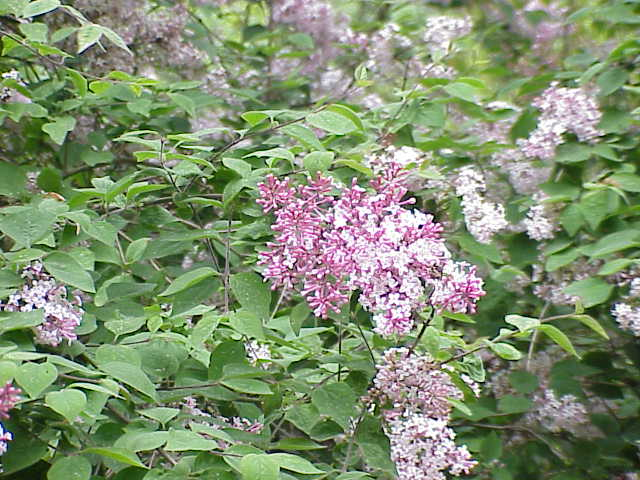
- S. pubescens subsp. julianae syn. S. julianae

Scientific classification
- Kingdom: Plantae
- Clade: Embryophytes
- Clade: Tracheophytes
- Clade: Spermatophytes
- Clade: Angiosperms
- Clade: Eudicots
- Clade: Asterids
- Order: Lamiales
- Family: Oleaceae
- Genus: Syringa
- Species: S. pubescens

Binomial name
- Syringa pubescens Turcz.

= Syringa pubescens =

Species of flowering plant

Syringa pubescens is a species of flowering plant in the lilac genus of the family Oleaceae, native to Korea and China (Gansu, Hebei, Henan, Hubei, Jilin, Liaoning, Ningxia, Qinghai, Shaanxi, Shandong, Shanxi, Sichuan).

Growing to 6 m (20 ft) tall and broad, it is a substantial deciduous shrub with green leaves felted white beneath, and panicles of heavily scented, white-throated lilac flowers in early summer.

The Latin specific epithet pubescens means "downy", referring to the texture of the leaves.

Three subspecies (formerly listed as separate species) are recognized:

- Syringa pubescens subsp. julianae – syn. S. julianae
- Syringa pubescens subsp. microphylla – syn. S. microphylla
- Syringa pubescens subsp. patula (also Syringa velutina) – syn. S. patula (Korean lilac, Manchurian lilac)

The cultivar S. pubescens subsp. microphylla 'Superba' has gained the Royal Horticultural Society's Award of Garden Merit.

According to some authorities Syringa meyeri C.K.Schneid. is a synonym of S. pubescens. The cultivar 'Palibin' has also won the AGM. However, the nearly palmate leaf venation of plants labelled S. meyeri is noticeably distinct from the pinnate venation of other forms of S. pubescens.
