= Fountain, Minnesota =

City in Minnesota, United States

Fountain
- City
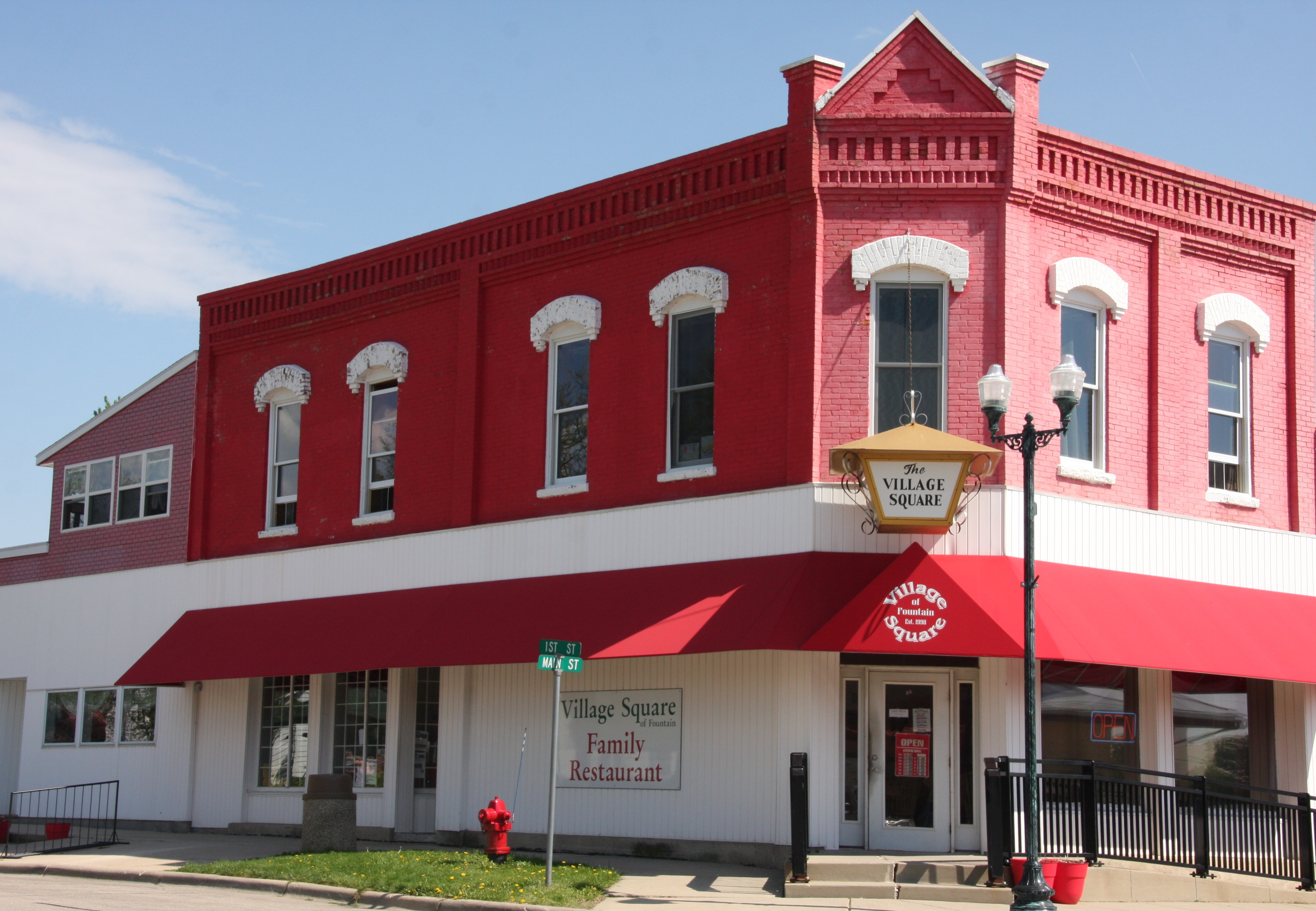
- Village Square at First and Main Streets

- Location of Fountain, Minnesota
- Coordinates: 43°44′33″N 92°08′03″W
- Country: United States
- State: Minnesota
- County: Fillmore

Area
  - Total: 0.99 sq mi (2.57 km^{2})
  - Land: 0.99 sq mi (2.57 km^{2})
  - Water: 0 sq mi (0.00 km^{2})
- Elevation: 1,303 ft (397 m)

Population (2020)
  - Total: 409
  - Density: 411.5/sq mi (158.88/km^{2})
- Time zone: UTC-6 (Central (CST))
  - Summer (DST): UTC-5 (CDT)
- ZIP code: 55935
- Area code: 507
- FIPS code: 27-22094
- GNIS feature ID: 2394801
- Website: https://www.fountainmn.org/

Fountain is a city in Fillmore County, Minnesota, United States. As of the 2020 census, Fountain had a population of 409. Fountain is the western terminus of the Root River segment of the Root River State Trail. Local attractions include the Fillmore County History Center.

== Geography ==
According to the United States Census Bureau, the city has a total area of 0.83 square miles (2.15 km^{2}), all land.

Fountain is claimed as the sinkhole capital of the United States of America due to the prevalence of karst topography.

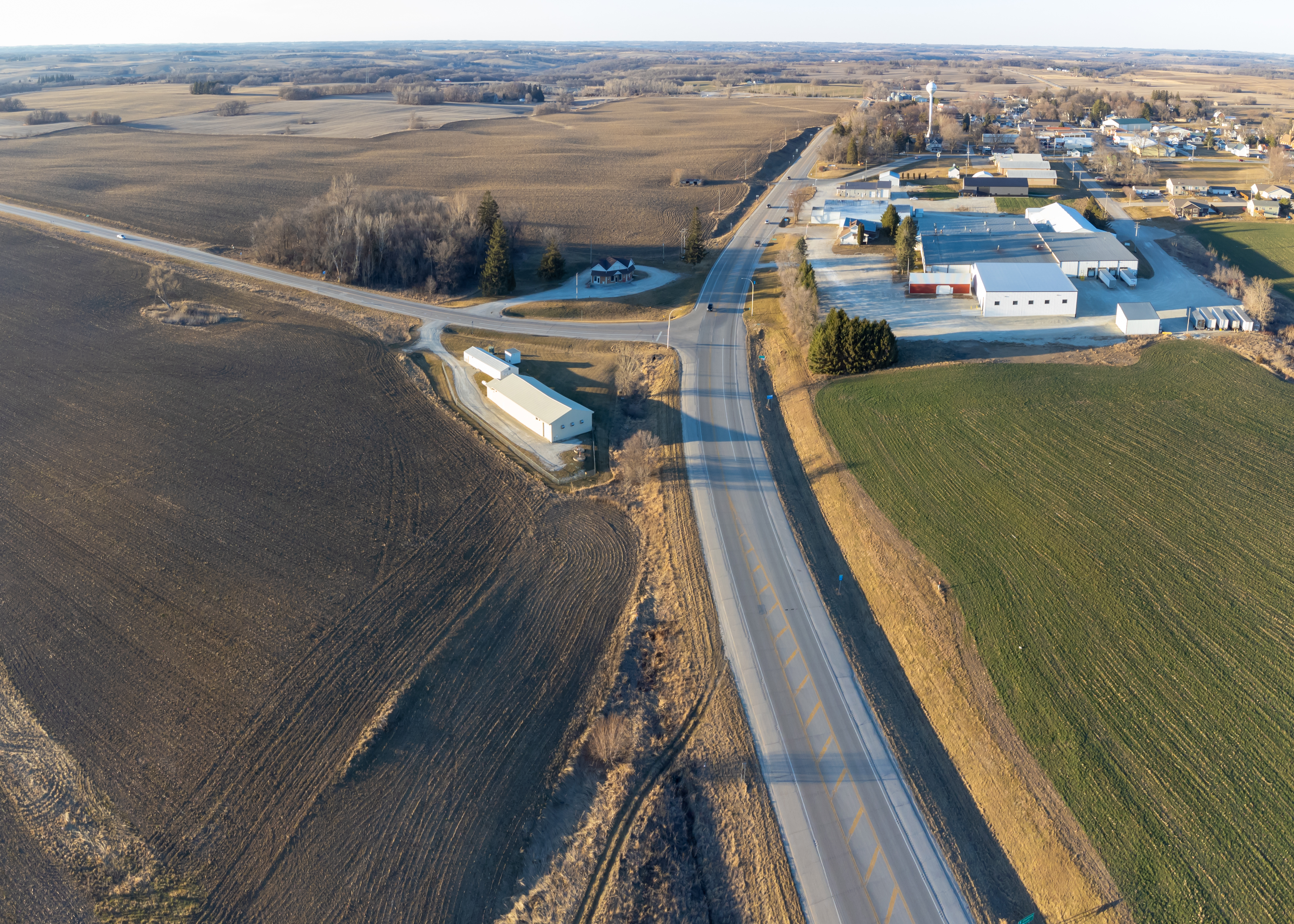
US-52 & MN-80 junction

== Demographics ==
Historical population
| Census | Pop. | Note | %± |
|---|---|---|---|
| 1880 | 266 | | — |
| 1890 | 248 | | −6.8% |
| 1900 | 294 | | 18.5% |
| 1910 | 321 | | 9.2% |
| 1920 | 340 | | 5.9% |
| 1930 | 303 | | −10.9% |
| 1940 | 306 | | 1.0% |
| 1950 | 312 | | 2.0% |
| 1960 | 297 | | −4.8% |
| 1970 | 347 | | 16.8% |
| 1980 | 327 | | −5.8% |
| 1990 | 327 | | 0.0% |
| 2000 | 343 | | 4.9% |
| 2010 | 410 | | 19.5% |
| 2020 | 409 | | −0.2% |
U.S. Decennial Census

=== 2010 census ===
As of the census of 2010, there were 410 people, 171 households, and 112 families living in the city. The population density was 494.0 inhabitants per square mile (190.7/km^{2}). There were 177 housing units at an average density of 213.3 per square mile (82.4/km^{2}). The racial makeup of the city was 98.0% White, 0.2% Native American, 0.5% Asian, 0.7% from other races, and 0.5% from two or more races. Hispanic or Latino of any race were 2.0% of the population.

There were 171 households, of which 35.7% had children under the age of 18 living with them, 52.6% were married couples living together, 7.0% had a female householder with no husband present, 5.8% had a male householder with no wife present, and 34.5% were non-families. 29.2% of all households were made up of individuals, and 10.5% had someone living alone who was 65 years of age or older. The average household size was 2.40 and the average family size was 2.96.

The median age in the city was 37.3 years. 27.1% of residents were under the age of 18; 5.8% were between the ages of 18 and 24; 25.9% were from 25 to 44; 27.1% were from 45 to 64; and 14.1% were 65 years of age or older. The gender makeup of the city was 50.7% male and 49.3% female.

=== 2000 census ===
As of the census of 2000, there were 343 people, 131 households, and 94 families living in the city. The population density was 413.4 inhabitants per square mile (159.6/km^{2}). There were 137 housing units at an average density of 165.1 per square mile (63.7/km^{2}). The racial makeup of the city was 98.54% White, 0.58% Native American, and 0.87% from two or more races.

There were 131 households, out of which 32.1% had children under the age of 18 living with them, 67.9% were married couples living together, 2.3% had a female householder with no husband present, and 27.5% were non-families. 20.6% of all households were made up of individuals, and 9.2% had someone living alone who was 65 years of age or older. The average household size was 2.62 and the average family size was 3.06.

In the city, the population was spread out, with 26.2% under the age of 18, 11.4% from 18 to 24, 30.3% from 25 to 44, 18.4% from 45 to 64, and 13.7% who were 65 years of age or older. The median age was 35 years. For every 100 females, there were 100.6 males. For every 100 females age 18 and over, there were 105.7 males.

The median income for a household in the city was $40,250, and the median income for a family was $49,583. Males had a median income of $28,571 versus $22,321 for females. The per capita income for the city was $18,085. None of the families and 3.4% of the population were living below the poverty line, including no under eighteens and 8.9% of those over 64.
