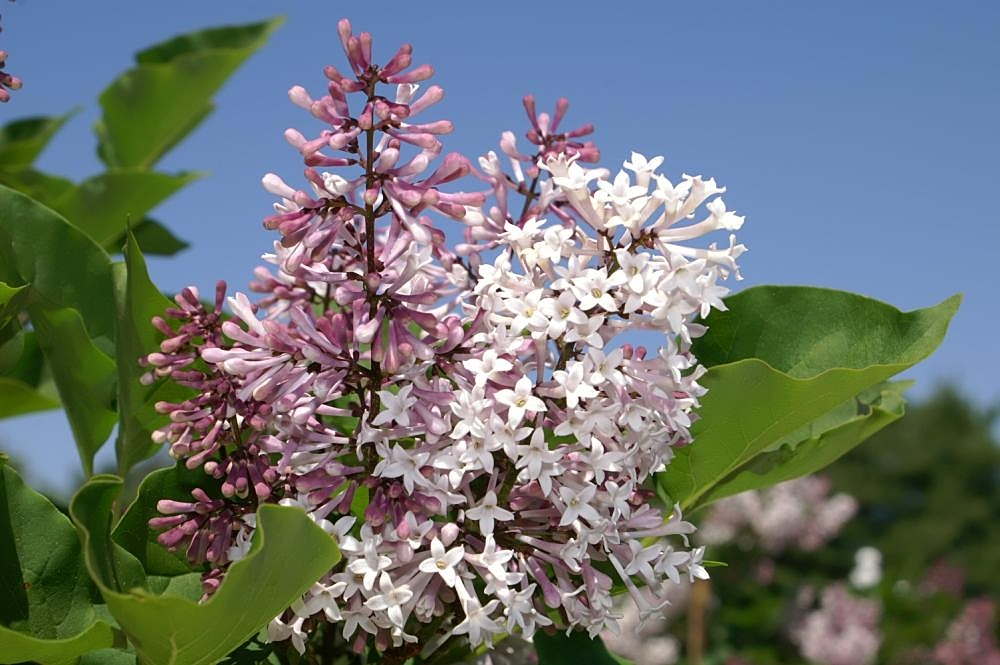

Scientific classification
- Kingdom: Plantae
- Clade: Tracheophytes
- Clade: Angiosperms
- Clade: Eudicots
- Clade: Asterids
- Order: Lamiales
- Family: Oleaceae
- Genus: Syringa
- Species: S. pubescens
- Subspecies: S. p. subsp. patula

Trinomial name
- Syringa pubescens subsp. patula (Palib.) M.C.Chang & X.L.Chen

Synonyms
- List: Ligustrum patulum Palib.; Syringa patula (Palib.) Nakai; Syringa pubescens var. patula (Palib.) M.Kim; Syringa debelderorum J.L.Fiala; Syringa fauriei var. lactea (Nakai) Nakai; Syringa kamibayashii Nakai; Syringa koehneana C.K.Schneid.; Syringa micrantha Nakai; Syringa palibiniana Nakai; Syringa palibiniana var. kamibayashii (Nakai) Nakai; Syringa palibiniana var. lactea (Nakai) Nakai; Syringa palibiniana var. longifolia Nakai; Syringa patula var. kamibayashii (Nakai) M.Kim; Syringa patula var. venosa (Nakai) M.Kim; Syringa pubescens f. alba S.D.Zhao; Syringa pubescens f. hirsuta (Skvortsov & W.Wang) Kitag.; Syringa pubescens var. hirsuta Skvortsov & W.Wang; Syringa pubescens var. kamibayashii (Nakai) M.Kim; Syringa pubescens f. lactea (Nakai) M.Kim; Syringa pubescens var. venosa (Nakai) M.Kim; Syringa velutina Kom.; Syringa velutina var. kamibayashii (Nakai) T.B.Lee; Syringa velutina f. lactea (Nakai) T.B.Lee; Syringa velutina var. lactea (Nakai) Y.N.Lee; Syringa velutina var. palibiniana (Nakai) S.D.Zhao; Syringa velutina var. venosa (Nakai) Y.N.Lee; Syringa venosa Nakai in; Syringa venosa var. lactea (Nakai) Nakai; Syringa villosa var. lactea Nakai

= Miss Kim lilac =

Subspecies of flowering plant

The Miss Kim lilac (Syringa pubescens subsp. patula 'Miss Kim') is a cultivar of lilac which was selected by Elwyn M. Meader while stationed in Korea as an army horticulturist. It was supposedly named after Elwyn M. Meader's Korean helper, whose name was Kim. The species is endemic to Korea and Northeast China. Flowers produced by this species are of pink, purple, and a light blue hues which accompany a sweet smelling aroma. Alongside flower production, fruits called loculicidal capsules are produced. This species tends to bloom in the spring months.

== Description ==
These are deciduous flowering shrubs. They are multi-stemmed woody organisms which lose their flowers and leaves before going dormant for the winter season. Due to the Miss Kim variety's comparatively late bloom season, it has a lower risk of flower bud damage due to freezing weather conditions. Individual plants grow may grow between 1 and 3 meters (3.3 and 9.8 ft) tall with a width being between 1.5 to 2.2 meters (4.9 to 7.2 ft). This species grows at a steady rate with full maturity of an individual shrub taking up to three years. Leaves tend to be green during bloom season. In later seasons, they may look red or in some cases burgundy. The foliage of this species is a rounded, smaller configuration when compared to leaves of other lilac species. This species tends to grow exceedingly well in areas with hardiness zones between 3 and 8.

=== Flowers ===
These flowers most commonly bloom in mid-to-late spring between the months of April and May. Each shrub yields tight panicle clusters of purple tubular modeled flower buds that are 4" to 6" in size which grow in pairs. Each singular flower consists of a four-lobed corolla, accompanied by a corolla tube, with a length of 5 to 20 millimetres (0.20 to 0.79 inches); they are monoecious species. The pistils of each flower contains the fertile stamens and stigmas that are used for reproduction. Lilac plants require an interval of a cold for flowering purposes before they go dormant for the season. At full bloom, each flower will consist of 4-5 petals. The shades of the flowers may vary between light hues of purple, pink, and blue. Of the species of lilacs, Miss Kim lilacs produce some of the most fragrant flowers during bloom season.

==== Blooming conditions ====
This species blooms relatively late in the spring when it is warm, which limits how susceptible individual plants are to mildew and mold growth from moist environments. Soil must be well-draining and in an area where water is not likely to pool but that stays relatively moist. Too much or too little water may lead to a 'Miss Kim' plant that does not bloom. It also needs plenty of direct sunlight. This plant requires pruning directly after it has flowered for the season to maintain annual blooming of flowers. Without pruning dead flowers before winter, new flowers may not grow in the following bloom season.

==== Geographical distribution ====
Syringa pubescens susp. patula is native to areas of north-eastern China, Korea, and Manchuria. Today, they can be found all over the United States, specifically in areas where the USDA Cold Hardiness is between 3 and 8. Some of these states include AR, WA, CA, and OH. Within these states, the weather conditions are suitable enough for established lilacs to survive in temperatures as low as −10 °F (−23 °C).

== Origin ==
While common lilacs were growing within Europe another species of lilacs were explored and examined. This new species was found in various areas within damp mountains of the Korean Pouk Han Mountains at high elevations. The subspecies of Syringa oblata and Pubescentes were collected and later investigated. Explorer Elwyn Meader, during the course of an expedition in the Pouk Han Mountains, selected some seeds from a collection which later was classified as the 'Miss Kim Lilac'.

== Pollination ==
Like most other magnoliophyta phylum plants, these plants are fertilized through pollen being carried by a pollinator or self-fertilization. The lilac species is known for self-pollinating through male flowers and female flowers on the same plant. Furthermore, pollinators have a large level of importance within agriculture for plants to reproduce annually. Pollinators of this plant include but, are not limited to, butterflies, birds, bees, and other insects.

The lilac species is a common plant used within individuals' gardens and agricultural conservation areas. Overall, the plant adds color and fragrance to the areas in which it inhabits. The growth of the plant is rather slow which makes it a great fit for individuals who do not have excess time to spend within their gardens everyday. Planting specimens of this species in areas where there is an ample amount of sun and relatively well-drained soil will lead to successful flower blooming and a consistent growth rate. The soil surrounding the plant must also be slightly acidic.

== Gallery ==
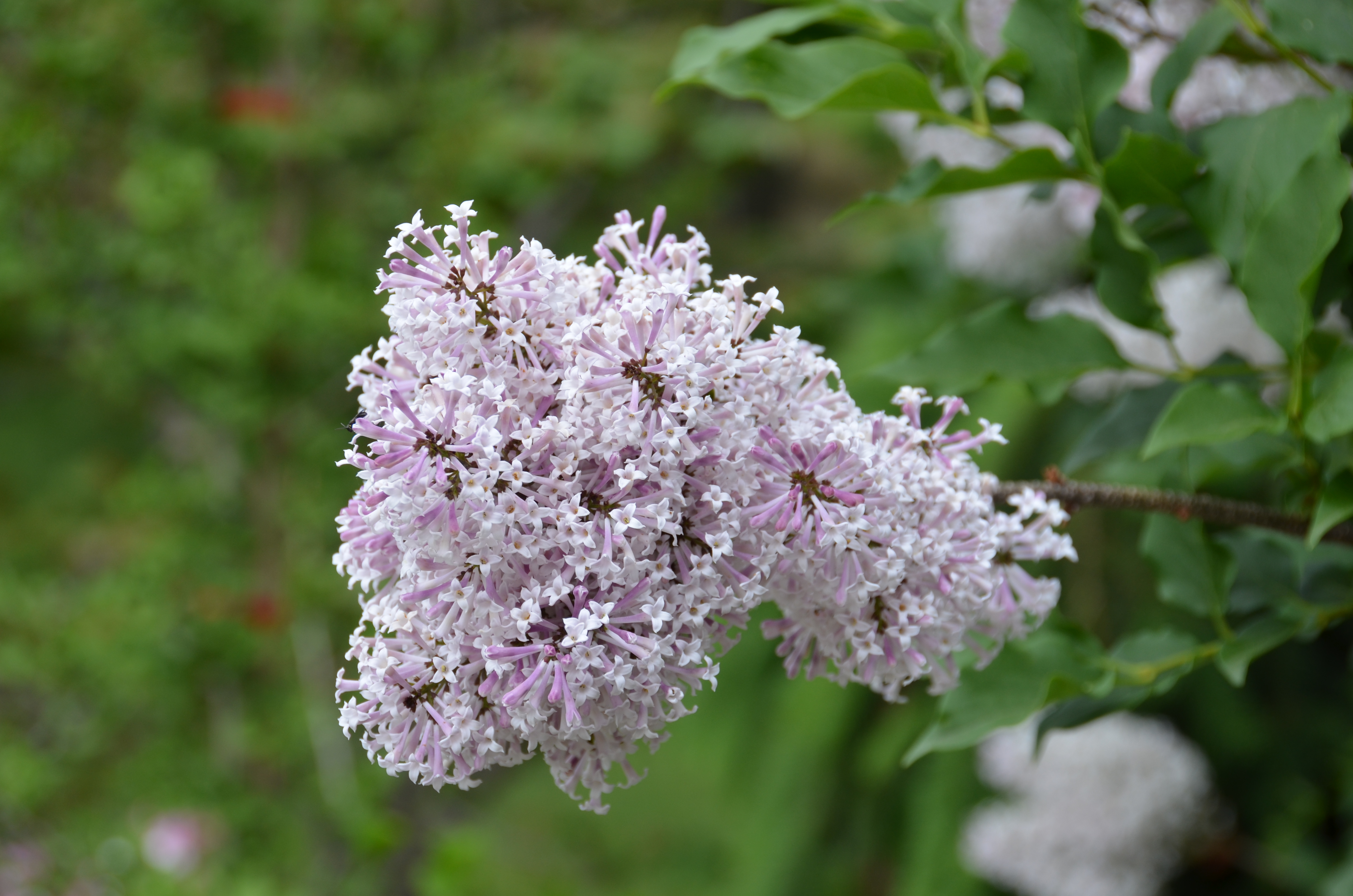
Up close photo of a syringa pubescent ssp. patula flower bunch. This shows the various hues of purple, white, and pink.

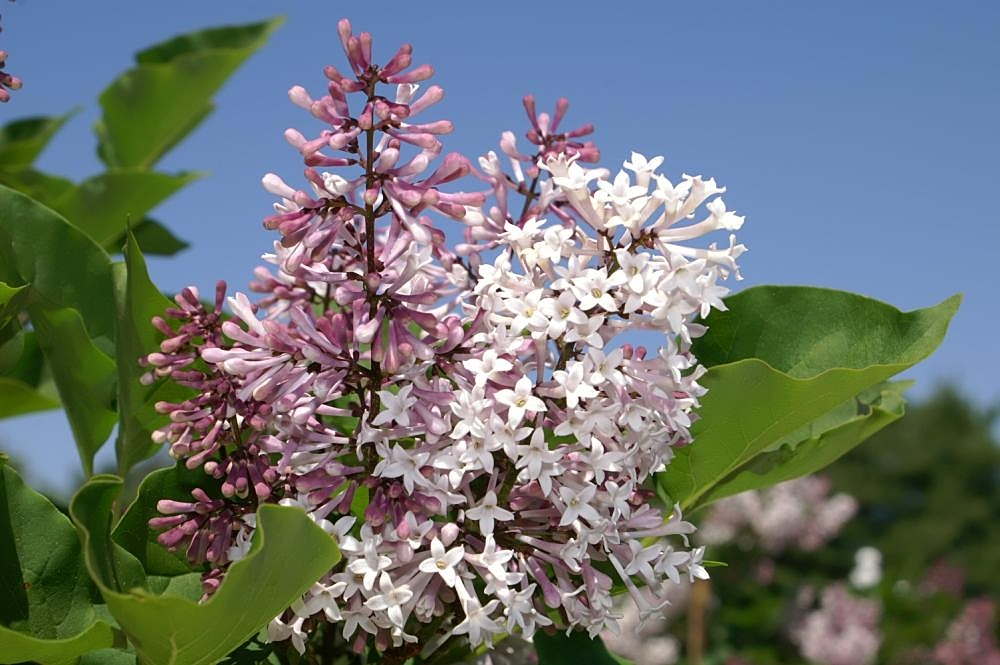
Another close photo of Miss Kim lilac flowers. The tubular-shaped flower petals and the dark purple and white colors are shown as well. The green foliage is showcased in the background of the photo.

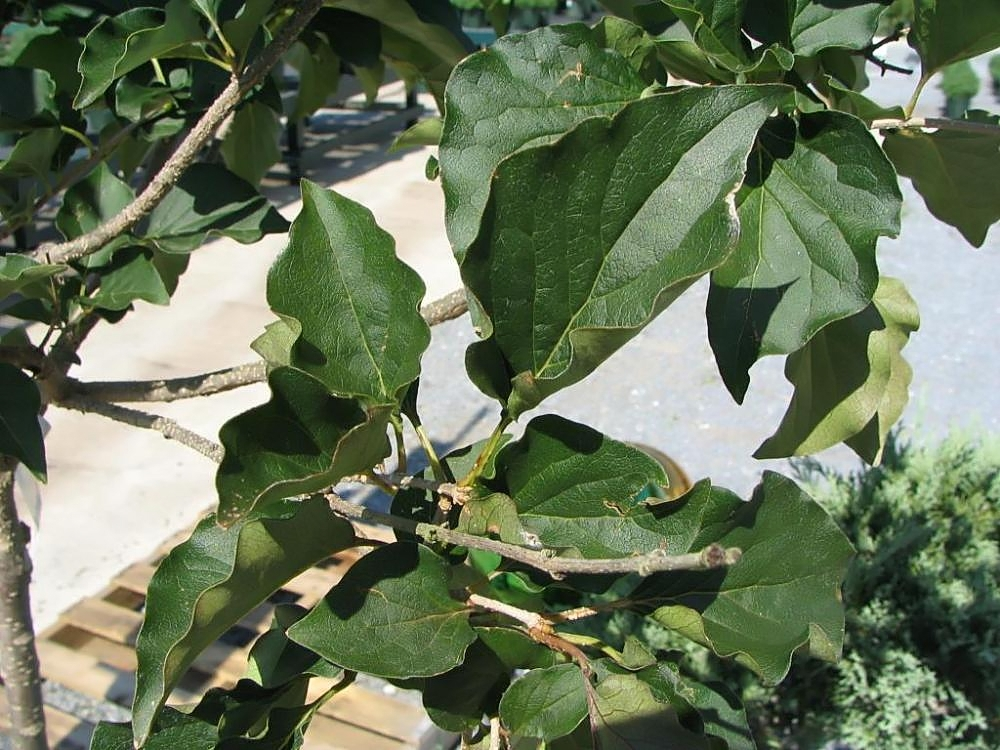
The green foliage leaves of a Miss Kim lilac. These are simple leaves with netted patterns.

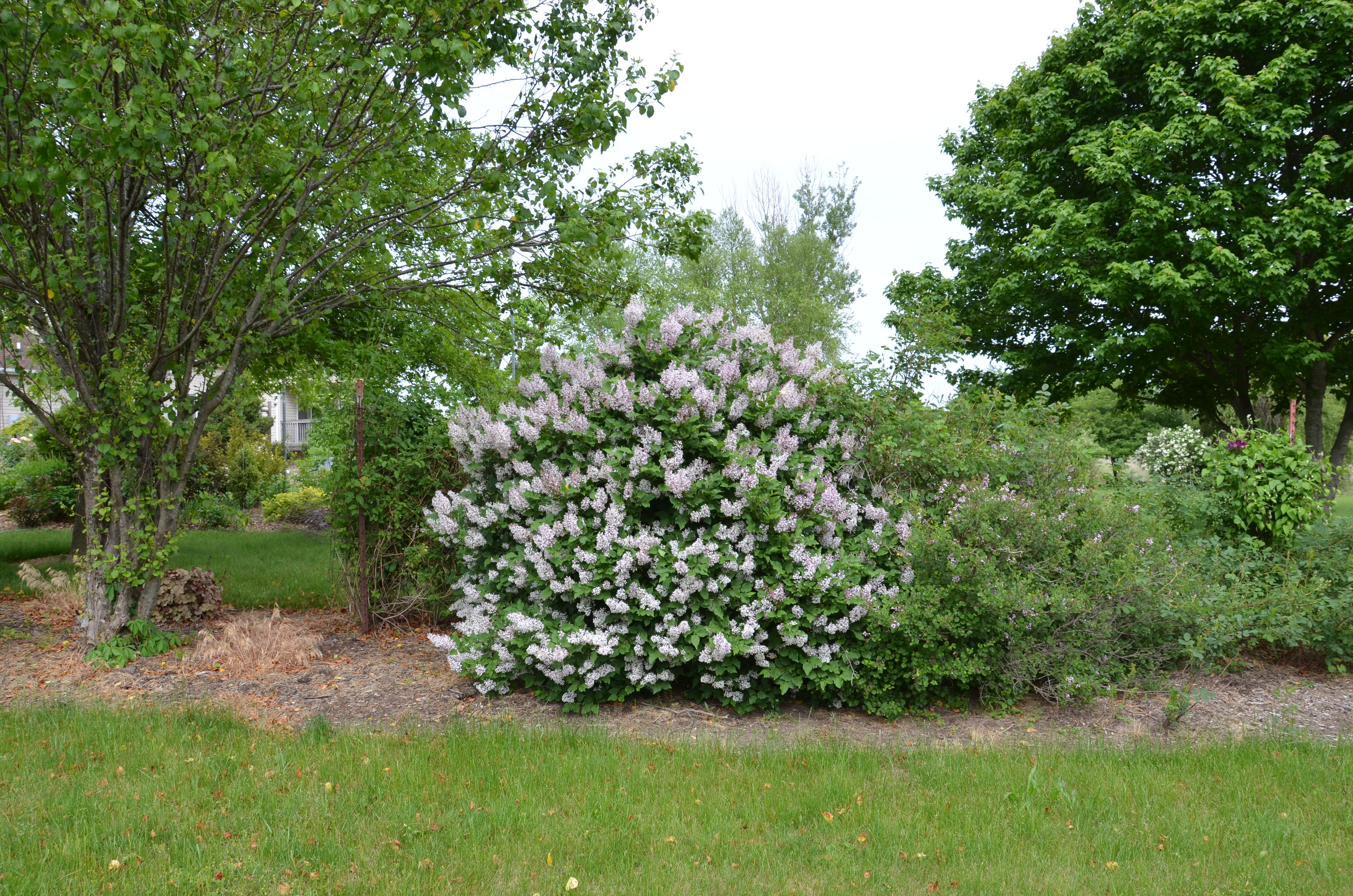
A fully mature Miss Kim lilac plant. This plant has many flowers blossoms towards one side of the shrub. One side blossoms could have been caused by inadequate sun exposure to the other side of the plant.

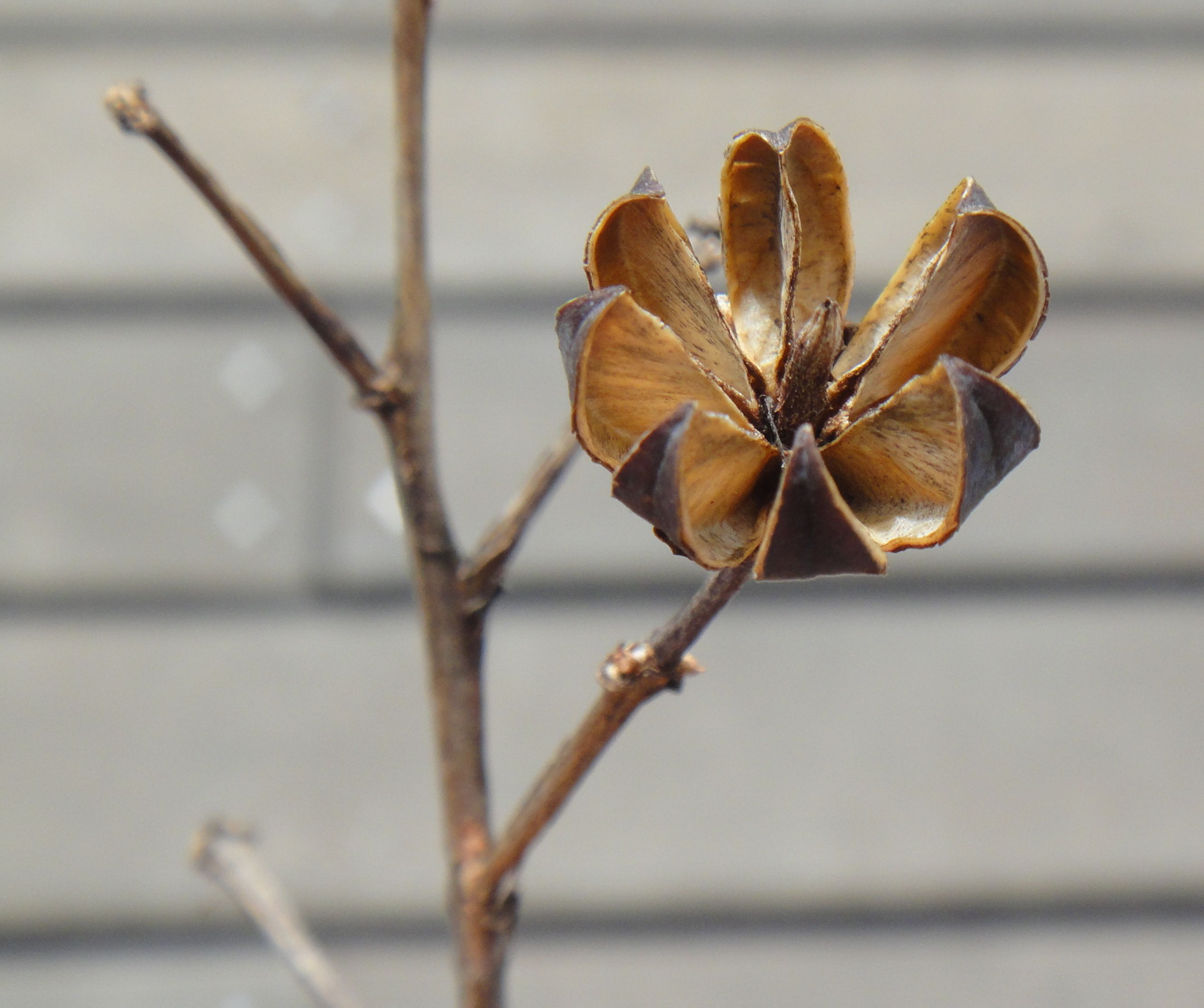
Dried out loculicidal capsule. These are produced by the plant after it has blossomed for the season.
