= Kansas State University College of Agriculture =

Agricultural school of Kansas State University

Coordinates: 39°11′32″N 96°34′52″W

KSU College of Agriculture
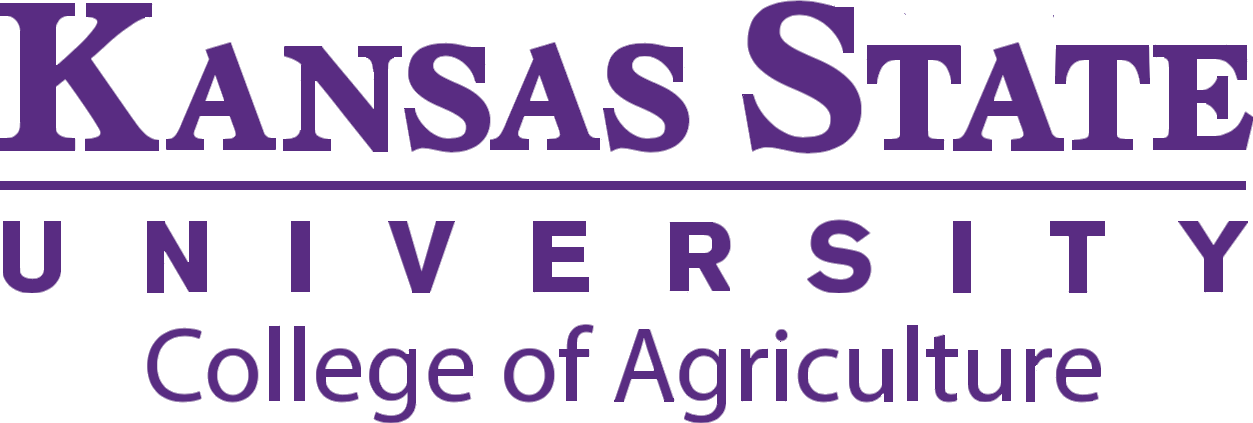
- Established: 1863
- Parent institution: Kansas State University
- Dean: Ernie Minton
- Location: Manhattan, Kansas
- Colors: KSU purple
- Website: www.ag.ksu.edu

The Kansas State University College of Agriculture offers 16 undergraduate majors, one undecided program, 15 minors, 5 certificates, and 18 graduate programs of study. Their subjects include agribusiness, bioscience, communications, economics, and natural resources. The College of Agriculture also houses more than 30 student organizations such as Agriculture Ambassadors, Meat Science Association, Food Science Club, Ag Technology Management Club, Ag Education Club, Collegiate 4-H, Sigma Alpha, Horticulture Club, and more.

As part of a land-grant university, the K-State College of Agriculture works closely with K-State Research and Extension to deliver research findings, educational programs and technical information through extension offices located throughout the state of Kansas.

The university was established under the Morrill Act of 1862.
