= Elwyn Meader =

American agriculturalist (1910–1996)

Elwyn Marshall Meader
- Born: March 31, 1910
- Died: July 19, 1996 (aged 86)
- Education: Bachelor of Science; Master of Science
- Alma mater: Rutgers University
- Known for: Developing new fruit cultivars
- Spouse: Virginia Allison Park
- Children: Allison Virginia Meader; John Park Meader
- Awards: Milo Gibson Award
- Scientific career
- Fields: Pomology
- Workplaces: USDA; University of New Hampshire
- Thesis: A Method for Determining the Relative Cold Hardiness of Dormant Peach Fruit Buds (1941)

Elwyn Marshall Meader (March 31, 1910 – July 19, 1996) was an American botanist and plant scientist. Over the course of his career, Meader developed over 50 new strains of plum, peach, squash, rutabaga, sweet corn, melon, watermelon, salad bean, pod bean, pepper, pumpkin, nectarine, bush cherry, kiwi fruit, persimmon, cranberry, raspberry, and blueberry. He developed the Miss Kim Lilac from seeds of a wild lilac bush he found in the mountains of Korea and decided to name it after "all the Miss Kims in Korea".

== Early life and education ==
Meader was born in Rochester, New Hampshire. He grew up in the Meaderboro section of Rochester on a farm which had been in the Meader family for more than 200 years. Attending the local primary school and high school, he then went on to become the first member of the Meader family to go to college, though he did drop out after his first year to help out on the farm. However, due to a case of appendicitis that prevented further farm work, he once again returned to college.

In 1937, Meader graduated with a B.S. from the University of New Hampshire, and in 1941 he received an M.S. from Rutgers University. His thesis at Rutgers was "A Method for Determining the Relative Cold Hardiness of Dormant Peach Fruit Buds".

== Career ==
Meader's career began as a pomologist for the USDA at the New Jersey Agricultural Experiment Station in the 1930s, where he was tasked with categorizing the traits of hybrid cultivars. Later, he worked as an administrator and horticultural consultant for the United States Military Government for one year in Korea. During his time there in 1948 he collected a small amount of cucumber seeds from the cultivar local to the Korean peninsula, which was noted as being a gynoecious plant that could produce fruit from every flower that grew from every node of the plant. Meader brought back the seeds and grew several generations on his own before dispersing them to other scientists in the United States.

This resulted in them being hybridized with other common cucumber cultivars that produced high-quality vegetables, enabling them also to increase their yield significantly by including this gynoecious trait. In the end, the seeds Meader brought back were used to create all modern hybrid cucumbers sold around the world. Another set of samples he brought back was for the Korean tree berry categorized as Rubus morifolius (Rubus condensatus), and it was found that, unlike blackberries and raspberries, it grew very well in an agricultural field and can act as a jam substitute. He crossed this Korean berry with the American red raspberry and ended up with a suitable cultivar after 15 further years of development, with the desire for it to be disease and cold resistant while still retaining flavor.

After he completed his time in Korea, he worked for the New Hampshire Agricultural Experiment Station at the University of New Hampshire in Durham. From that post he continued experimenting with new hybrid crosses of various crops. It has been determined that of the 100 new cultivars released by the station he worked at over decades, 40 of those had been developed by Meader himself. While working with Albert Yeager at the university in the late 1950s, the duo succeeded in developing the Golden Midget watermelon that was produced through the hybridization of the Pumpkin Rind and New Hampshire Midget cultivars. The special trait of this hybrid is that it turns yellow when ripe, as a color indicator. Meader decided to retire in 1966, but continued his experimentation at his family farm in Rochester.

The crop cultivars that Meader introduced throughout his life include the Meader blueberry, the Reliance peach, the Prestige raspberry, the August Red raspberry, the Casaba melon, the Royalty bean, the Permagreen pepper, and the Sweet Chocolate pepper. He also created hybrids of the bush cherry varieties Prunus jacquemontii and Prunus japonica and named the new plants Joy, Jan, and Joel. A Korean persimmon that Meader brought back with him was propagated on his farm in 1950 after 147 of the 150 seedlings he originally planted died from the winter cold, but one of the remaining three was successfully grown. The cultivar he ended up making was named the Meader persimmon and began producing fruit in 1961. Further testing and growth resulted in the Meader persimmon being sent nationwide to be grown in plant nurseries starting in 1974. He released the Regal Salad bean in 1990 that lacks any trichomes on its surface and thus can be eaten raw without discomfort.

== Personal life ==
Meader married Virginia Allison Park on July 11, 1938, in Pittsfield, New Hampshire. They had two children, Allison Virginia Meader and John Park Meader.

He was a devout Quaker. His work improving fruits and vegetables for farmers across the world was rooted in his faith.

== Awards and honors ==
Meader received the first Milo Gibson Award in 1976 for his horticultural efforts. In 1978, the University of New Hampshire awarded him an honorary doctoral degree.
