= Wykoff, Minnesota =

City in Minnesota, United States

City of Wykoff
- City
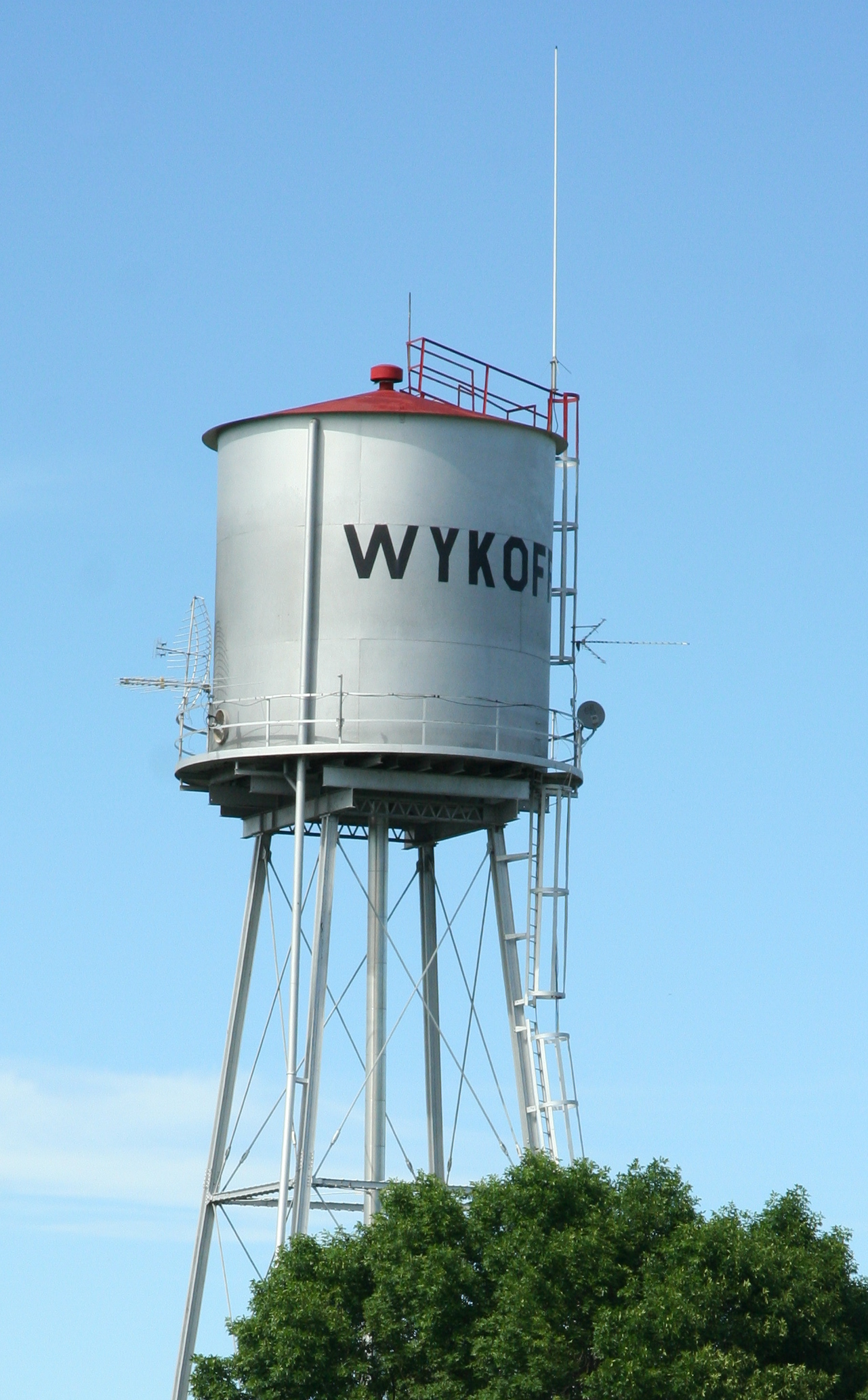
- Wykoff water tower
- Motto: "Gateway to Forestville"
- Location of Wykoff, Minnesota
- Coordinates: 43°42′31″N 92°16′03″W
- Country: United States
- State: Minnesota
- County: Fillmore

Area
  - Total: 0.93 sq mi (2.42 km^{2})
  - Land: 0.93 sq mi (2.42 km^{2})
  - Water: 0 sq mi (0.00 km^{2})
- Elevation: 1,322 ft (403 m)

Population (2020)
  - Total: 432
  - Density: 463.1/sq mi (178.82/km^{2})
- Time zone: UTC-6 (CST)
  - Summer (DST): UTC-5 (CDT)
- ZIP code: 55990
- Area code: 507
- FIPS code: 27-71950
- GNIS feature ID: 2397385
- Website: https://cityofwykoff.gov/

Wykoff is a city in Fillmore County, Minnesota, United States. The current mayor is Ryan Breckenridge. As of the 2020 census, Wykoff had a population of 432.

== History ==
Fannie Mahood Heath the "Flower lady of North Dakota" was born here in 1864. Wykoff was platted in 1871. It was named for Cyrus G. Wykoff, a railroad surveyor and early landowner. A post office has been in operation at Wykoff since 1871. The town was incorporated on March 8, 1876.

Much of its downtown, on Gold Street, is designated as part of the Wykoff Commercial Historic District on the National Register of Historic Places.

== Geography ==
According to the United States Census Bureau, the city has a total area of 0.96 square miles (2.49 km^{2}), all land.

== Demographics ==
Historical population
Census	Pop.	Note	%±
1880	272		—
1890	335		23.2%
1900	495		47.8%
1910	456		−7.9%
1920	482		5.7%
1930	426		−11.6%
1940	521		22.3%
1950	509		−2.3%
1960	391		−23.2%
1970	450		15.1%
1980	482		7.1%
1990	493		2.3%
2000	460		−6.7%
2010	444		−3.5%
2020	432		−2.7%
U.S. Decennial Census

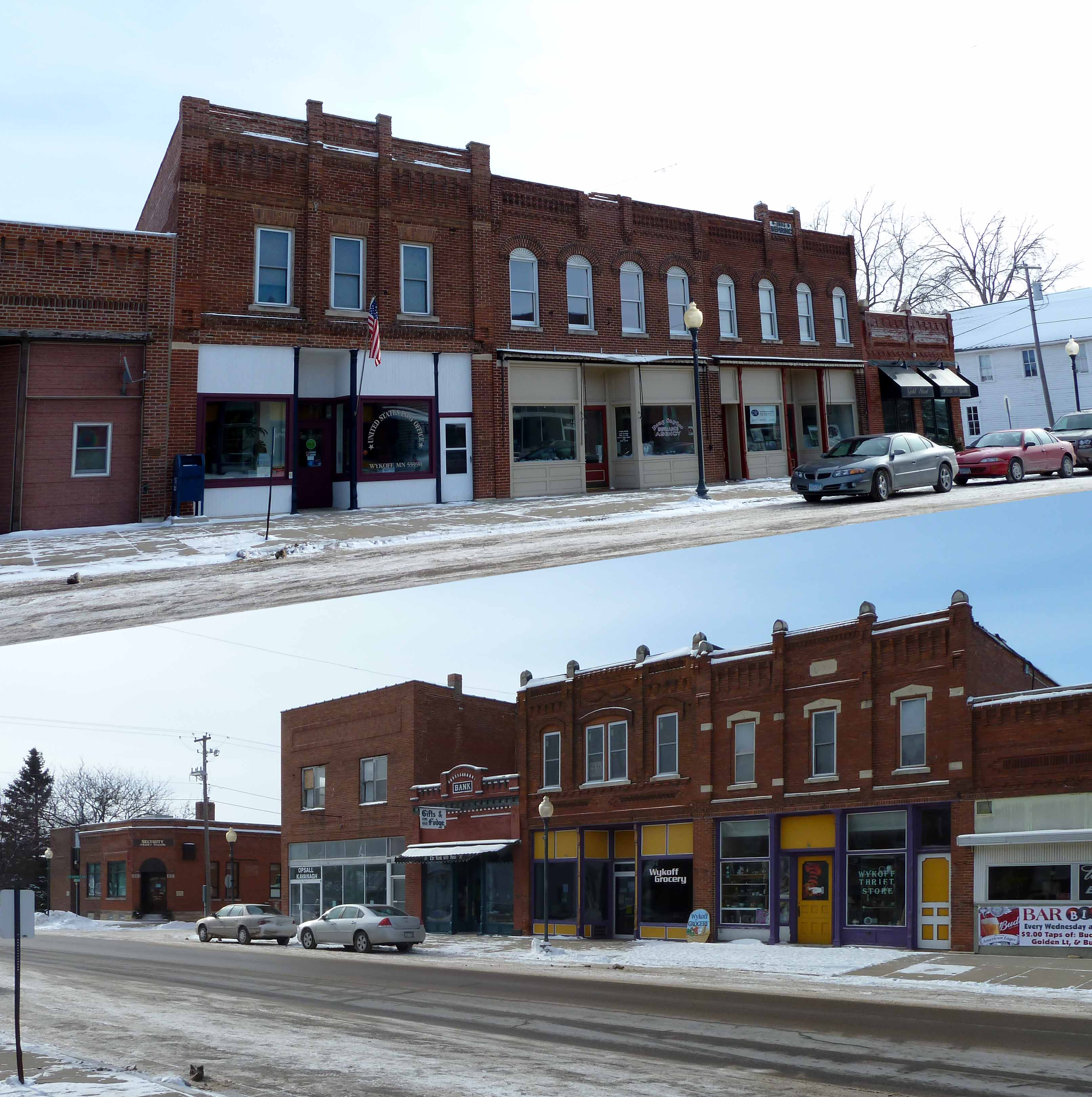
Photomontage of the Wykoff Commercial Historic District.

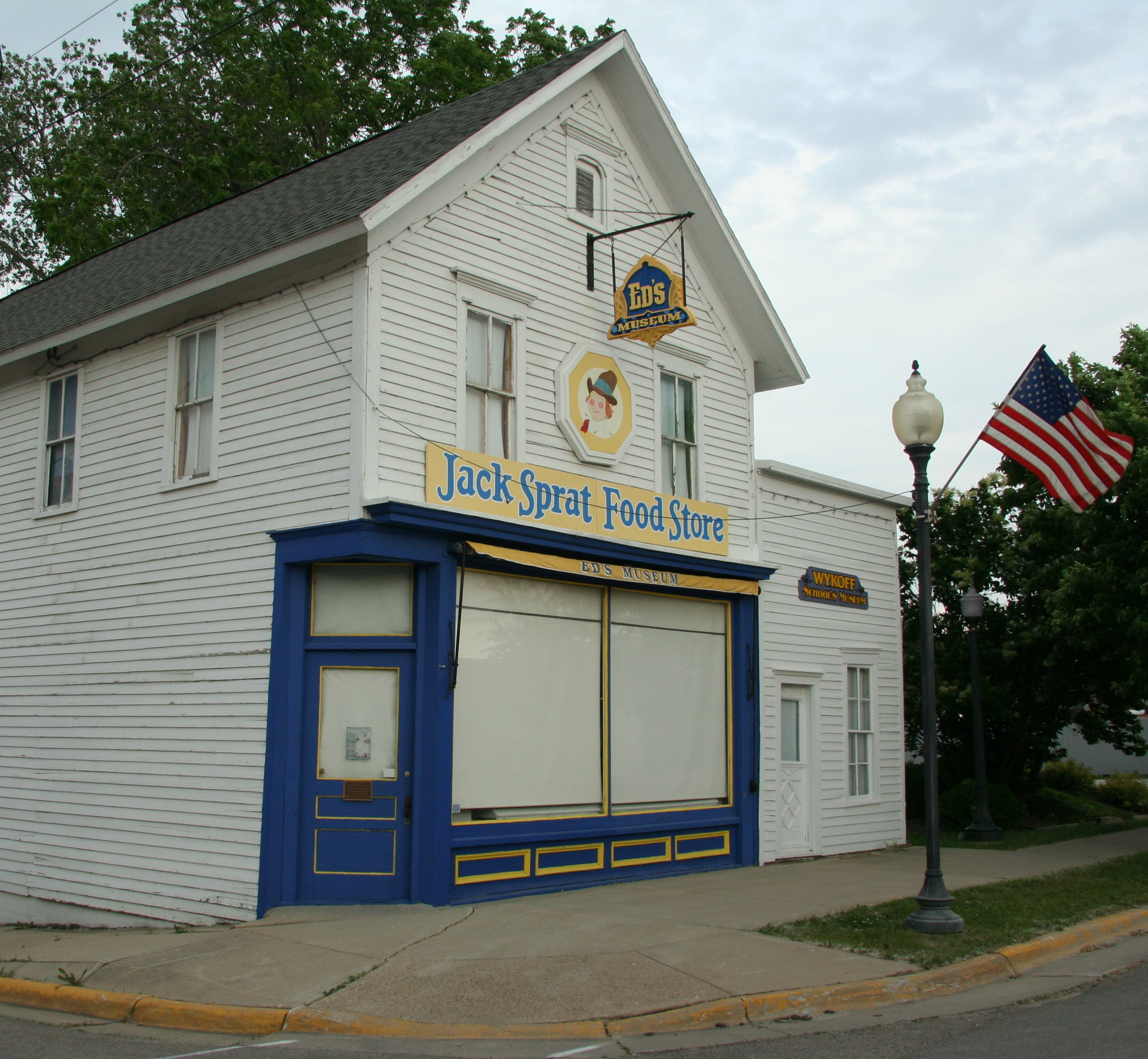
The old Jack Sprat Food Store, now Ed's Museum, in the Gold Street Historic Commercial District

=== 2010 census ===
As of the census of 2010, there were 444 people, 198 households, and 126 families living in the city. The population density was 462.5 inhabitants per square mile (178.6/km^{2}). There were 217 housing units at an average density of 226.0 per square mile (87.3/km^{2}). The racial makeup of the city was 98.9% White, 0.2% African American, 0.2% Native American, 0.2% Asian, and 0.5% from two or more races.

There were 198 households, of which 24.7% had children under the age of 18 living with them, 48.5% were married couples living together, 8.6% had a female householder with no husband present, 6.6% had a male householder with no wife present, and 36.4% were non-families. 27.8% of all households were made up of individuals, and 11.1% had someone living alone who was 65 years of age or older. The average household size was 2.24 and the average family size was 2.75.

The median age in the city was 44 years. 21.4% of residents were under the age of 18; 7.1% were between the ages of 18 and 24; 22.5% were from 25 to 44; 28.7% were from 45 to 64; and 20.5% were 65 years of age or older. The gender makeup of the city was 48.2% male and 51.8% female.

=== 2000 census ===
As of the census of 2000, there were 460 people, 207 households, and 138 families living in the city. The population density was 484.0 inhabitants per square mile (186.9/km^{2}). There were 216 housing units at an average density of 227.3 per square mile (87.8/km^{2}). The racial makeup of the city was 98.70% White, 0.65% Native American, 0.43% from other races, and 0.22% from two or more races. Hispanic or Latino of any race were 0.87% of the population.

There were 207 households, out of which 24.6% had children under the age of 18 living with them, 55.1% were married couples living together, 9.2% had a female householder with no husband present, and 33.3% were non-families. 28.5% of all households were made up of individuals, and 11.6% had someone living alone who was 65 years of age or older. The average household size was 2.22 and the average family size was 2.68.

In the city, the population was spread out, with 20.2% under the age of 18, 7.8% from 18 to 24, 23.9% from 25 to 44, 22.0% from 45 to 64, and 26.1% who were 65 years of age or older. The median age was 43 years. For every 100 females, there were 100.0 males. For every 100 females age 18 and over, there were 95.2 males.

The median income for a household in the city was $30,625, and the median income for a family was $38,875. Males had a median income of $27,083 versus $22,083 for females. The per capita income for the city was $17,956. About 1.4% of families and 6.4% of the population were below the poverty line, including 4.0% of those under age 18 and 9.6% of those age 65 or over.
