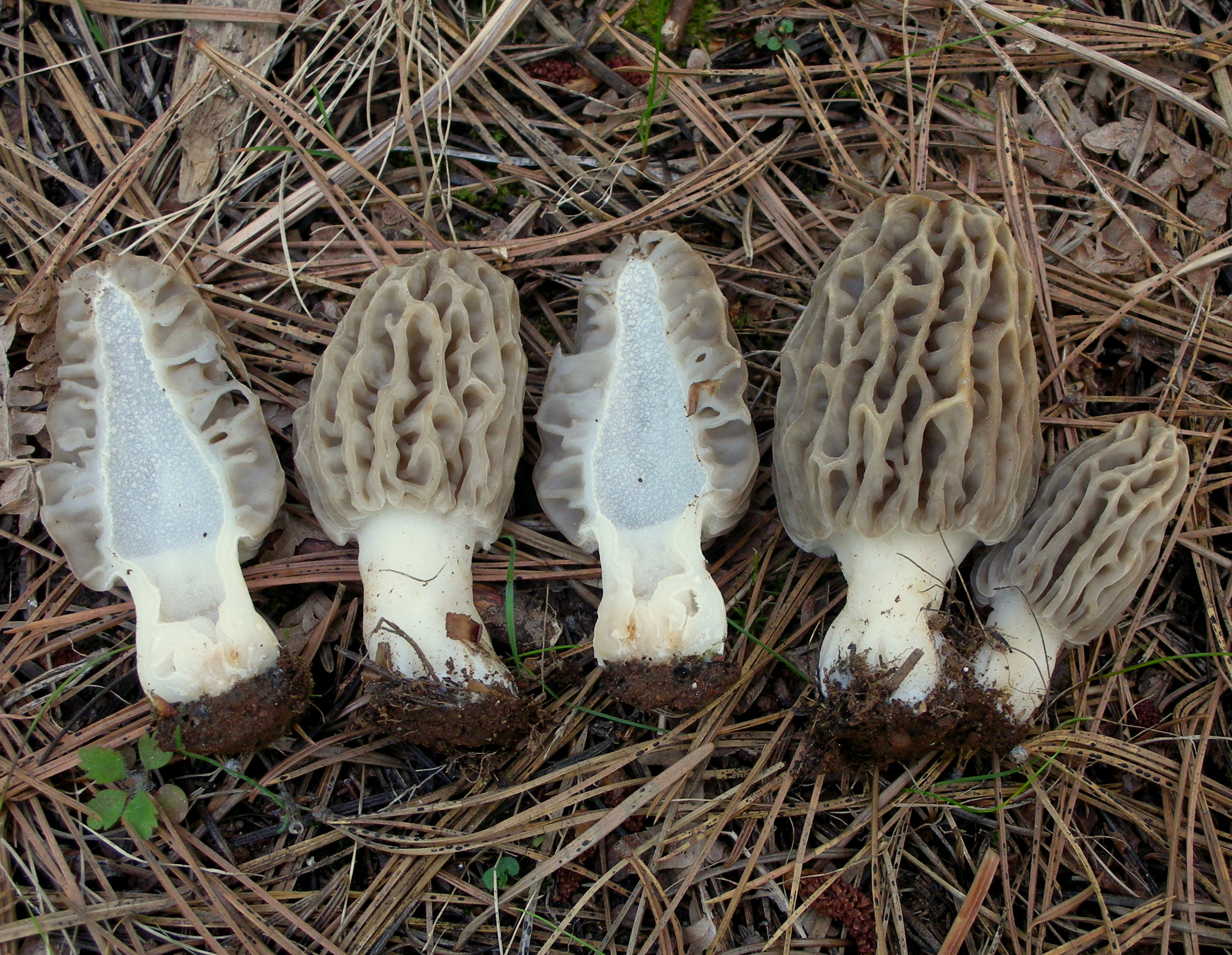

Scientific classification
- Kingdom: Fungi
- Division: Ascomycota
- Class: Pezizomycetes
- Order: Pezizales
- Family: Morchellaceae
- Genus: Morchella
- Species: M. tridentina

Binomial name
- Morchella tridentina Bres., 1892

Synonyms
- M. elatoides Jacquet, 1984 (nomen invalidum); M. elatoides var. elegans Jacquet, 1984 (nomen invalidum); M. frustrata M. Kuo, 2012; M. quercus-ilicis Clowez, Ballester & L. Romero, 2012; M. conica var. pseudoeximia Clowez, Ballester & L. Romero, 2012

= Morchella tridentina =

Species of fungus

Morchella tridentina is a cosmopolitan species of ascomycete fungus in the family Morchellaceae. Commonly referred to as the mountain blond or western blond morel in North America, it produces conical, grey to buff fruit bodies that are rufescent and grow up to 20 cm (7.9 in) tall and 5 cm (2.0 in) wide. This early-diverging species is distinct within the /Elata clade (black morels) due to its pale colours and has been described by many names in the past, including M. frustrata, M. quercus-ilicis, M. elatoides, M. elatoides var. elegans and M. conica var. pseudoeximia, all of which were shown to be synonyms. A widely distributed relict of the last Ice Age, M. tridentina is so far known from Argentina, Armenia, Chile, Cyprus, France, India, Israel, North America, Spain and Turkey.

== Taxonomy ==
Morchella tridentina was first described by Giacomo Bresadola in 1892 in a work on fungi found in the region of Trento in Italy. The species' epithet derives from the Roman name of Trento,Tridentum, a tribute to the Roman god Neptune.

In 1985, French mycologist Émile Jaquetant described the same species as M. elatoides, a name that was later shown to be an invalidly published synonym of M. tridentina.

In a 2012 publication by Michael Kuo and colleagues, the taxon Morchella frustrata was described as new to science from Placer County, California, to accommodate the phylogenetic lineage defined the year before by DNA sequencing as "Mel-2". The publication resulted from the Morel Data Collection Project, which aimed to clarify aspects of the biology, taxonomy and distribution of North American Morchella, and described 14 new morel species without, however, ruling out existing European names. As a result, in two subsequent international studies, Richard and colleagues (in 2014) and Loizides and colleagues (in 2015) used DNA analysis from both European and North American collections to determine that this species is identical to morels collected in southern Europe, matching the original 1892 description of Morchella tridentina by Bresadola. Two original collections identified as M. tridentina by Bresadola himself kept at the Swedish Museum of Natural History, were also studied and found to match the protologue and typical morphology of this species, although attempts to sequence these collections failed. Morchella frustrata was therefore placed in synonymy with M. tridentina, with the latter name having chronological priority over the former.

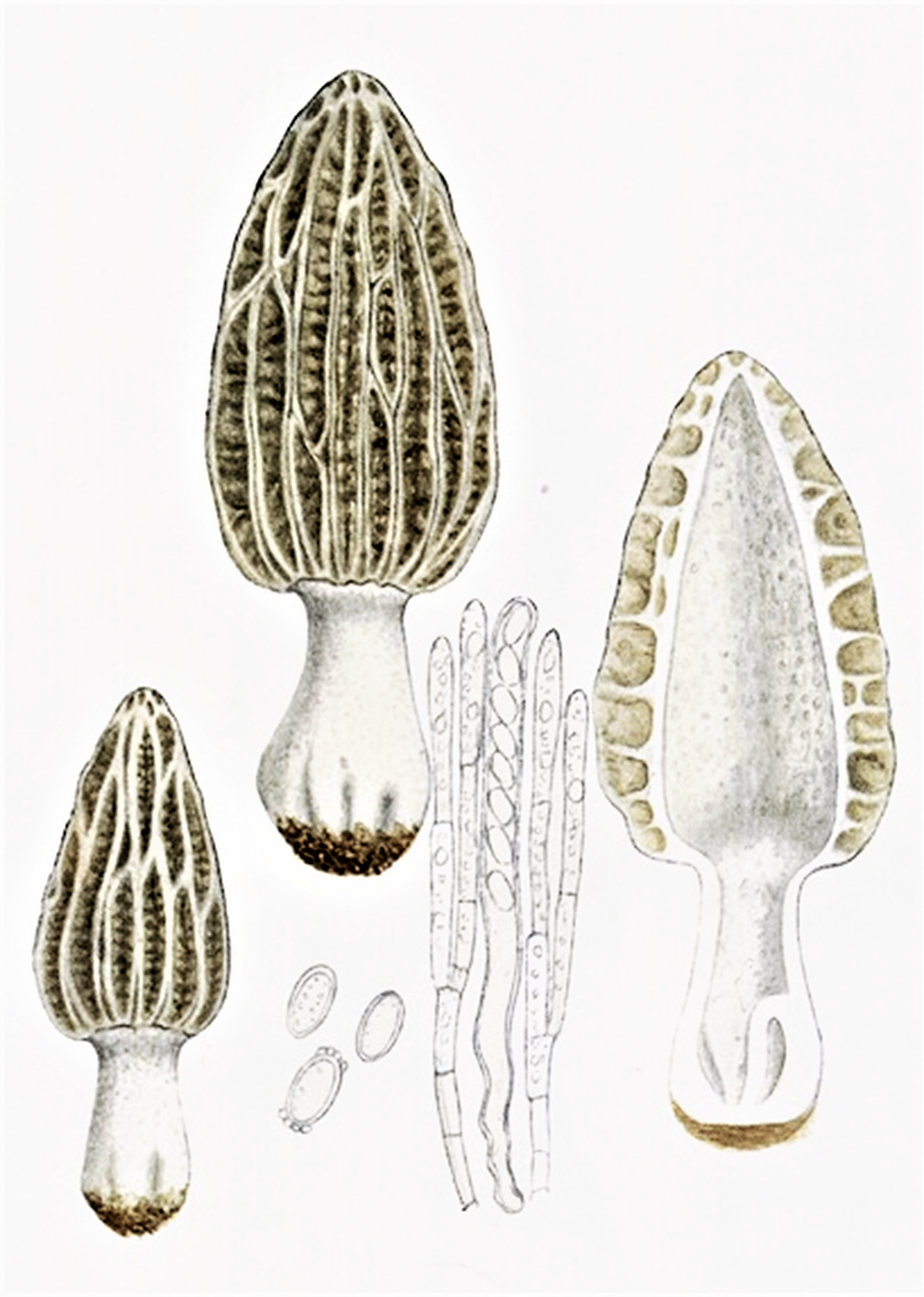
Original illustration of Morchella tridentina by Giacomo Bresadola.

Morchella quercus-ilicis, proposed by Clowez in 2012 from collections in Huelva, Spain, was also shown by Loizides and colleagues to be a synonym of M. tridentina, as are the varieties Morchella conica var. pseudoeximia, and Morchella elatoides var. elegans.

=== Common names ===
In North America, Morchella tridentina was given the common names "mountain blond morel" and "western blond morel".

== Phylogeny and reproductive modes ==
The first sequences of Morchella tridentina were published by Taşkın and collaborators in 2010, in a study investigating Morchella diversity in the Mediterranean and Aegean regions of Turkey. Because many morel lineages could not be ascribed with certainty to available binomials in early phylogenetic studies, this species was provisionally assigned the phylogenetic code "Mel-2". Despite its pale colors, M. tridentina belongs to the /Elata clade (section Distantes) along with other black morels such as M. angusticeps, M. exuberans and M. importuna. Together with the North American endemic M. tomentosa, M. tridentina occupies a basal position in the /Elata clade, which means it is adjacent to the root of the phylogenetic tree and therefore diverged earlier than other species in this clade.

A 2017 study by Du and colleagues investigated the reproductive modes, mating type and life cycle of fourteen morel species including M. tridentina. The authors reported that all studied morels are heterothallic and their life cycles are predominantly haploid, although sterile haploid fruiting was also observed. Ascospores are mostly haploid, homokaryotic and multinuclear.

== Description ==
=== Morphology ===
The fruit bodies are often rufescent and 9–20 cm (3.5–7.9 in) high. The conical cap is 4–6 cm (1.6–2.4 in) high and 2.5–4 cm (1.0–1.6 in) wide at the widest point. The cap surface features pits and ridges, which are formed from the intersection of 16–22 primary vertical ridges and few shorter, secondary vertical ridges, with frequent, sunken, horizontal ridges. The cap is attached to the stipe with a distinct sinus about 2–4 mm deep and 2–4 mm wide. The smooth, splitting ridges remain persistently pale throughout the maturity process, easily distinguishing this species from other species in section Distantes, or black morels, which have ridges that typically darken with age. Pits are usually elongated vertically. They are smooth and greyish when young, but later the entire fruit body fades to pale tan to pale ochre-tan. The stipe is 2–6 cm (0.8–2.4 in) high by 1–4 cm (0.4–1.6 in) wide and is more or less equal in width throughout its length or sometimes slightly enlarged at the base. Its white surface is smooth or finely mealy with whitish granules (having hyaline erect "hairs" when viewed under a microscope). The flesh is whitish and measures 1–2 mm thick in the hollow cap and the sterile inner surface of the cap is whitish and pubescent.

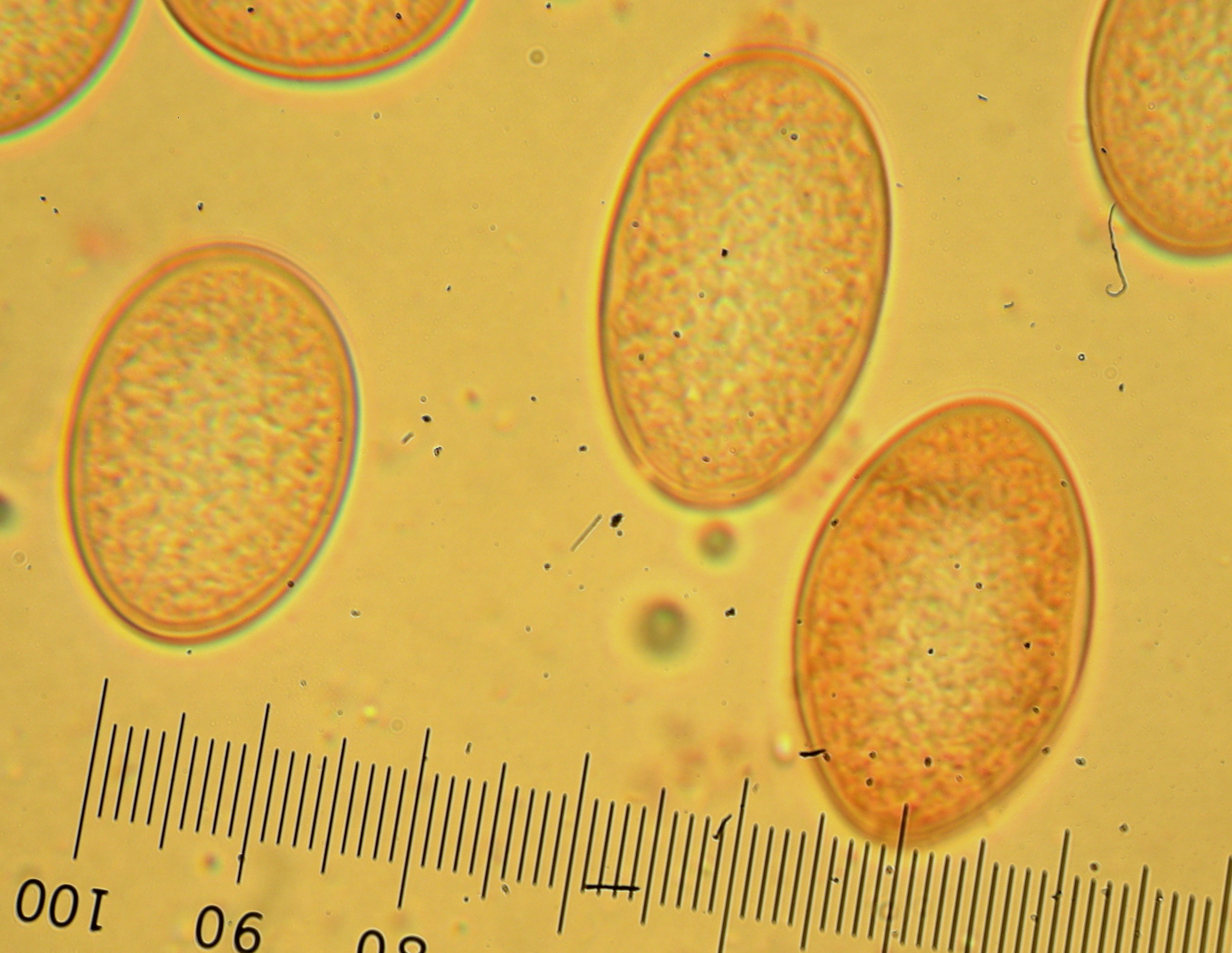
The spores are smooth or nearly smooth and elliptical.

The ascospores are elliptical and measure 20–26 by 13–18 μm. Spores appear smooth in normal light microscopy, but when viewed under a scanning electron microscope or in the appropriate staining medium, they can be inconspicuously sculpted. The asci (spore-bearing cells) measure 225–330 by 15–25 μm and are cylindrical, eight-spored, and hyaline (translucent) when mounted in dilute (2%) potassium hydroxide (KOH). The paraphyses are cylindrical to capitate or moniliform, measuring 95–250 long by 10–25 μm wide, and are septate. Their tips are rounded to somewhat club-shaped or infrequently somewhat fuse-shaped. The acroparaphyses on the sterile ridges are cylindrical to club-shaped, septate, sometimes with incrustations at the apex, and measure 50–175 by 12.5–20 μm. The hyphoid hairs (terminal elements) of the stipe are abundant and form a regular palisade, measuring 65–100 by 12–15 μm.

=== Similar species ===
The light colors and pale ridges of M. tridentina make it easily distinguishable from other Distantes species, which have ridges that typically darken at maturity; as Kuo states, "it looks like a black morel with the colors of a yellow morel." However, the vertically arranged pits and ridges, as well as the slight indentation where the cap meets the stem on M. tridentina, more closely resemble the black morels such as M. elata.

Morchella tridentina is similar to Morchella rufobrunnea, another rufescent cosmopolitan species with pale colours, which is nonetheless found in urban and suburban areas. The latter is further distinguished by an adnate cap lacking a sinus and a distinct dark pruinescence on the stem, more pronounced in young fruit bodies.

Due to its light coloration, M. tridentina may also be confused with Morchella americana, a yellow morel in section Morchella with an elongated stature. However, M. americana is not rufescent and has less regularly arranged ridges and pits.

M. snyderi is somewhat similar in appearance to young specimens of M. tridentina, but mature specimens of the former species can be distinguished by the brown to black ridges on the cap, and the ridged and pocketed stipe.

== Edibility ==
Like all morels, Morchella tridentina is edible and choice. However, morels should not be eaten raw, as they can trigger allergic reactions in susceptible individuals. Their flavor is enhanced after they are fried, stuffed, or dried, and so is their safety for eating.

Confusion with toxic species of genus Gyromitra, particularly G. esculenta, is rare but not unheard of.

== Habitat and distribution ==
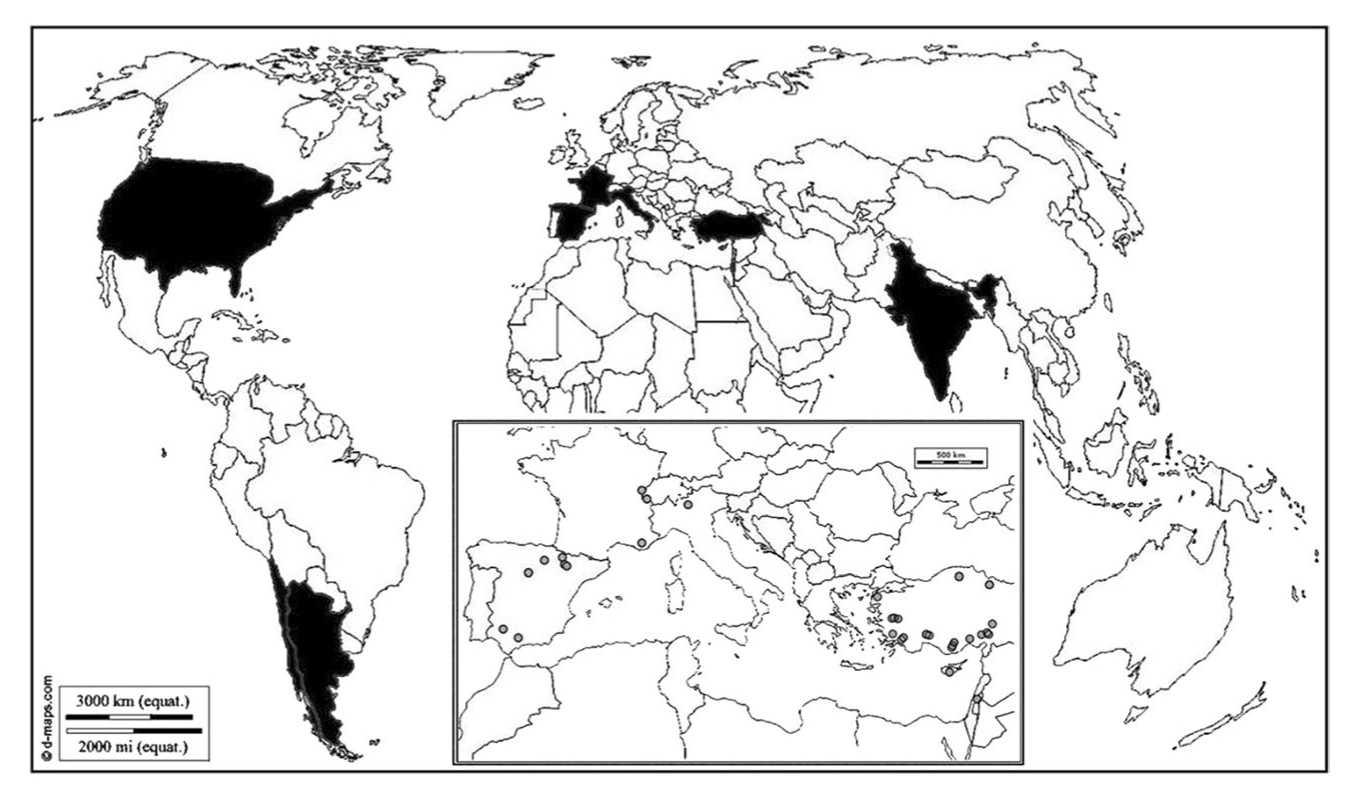
Global distribution map of M. tridentina (blackened regions) based on sequenced collections. Insert: Mediterranean collections.

Morchella tridentina has a widespread but disjunct distribution. So far, its presence has been molecularly verified in Argentina, Armenia, Chile, Cyprus, France, India, Israel, North America, Spain and Turkey. Kuo suggests that it might be also widely distributed in western North America, but so far it has only been confirmed to be present in Oregon and California.

It is usually found in mountainous forests and Mediterranean shrubland, growing solitary, scattered, or in small groups in the spring. Its exact trophic mode is not yet known with certainty, but it is suspected to be facultatively biotrophic and may form endosymbiotic associations with a wide array of trees and shrubs. Tree species associated with the fungus in North America include pacific madrone (Arbutus menziesii), oaks (Quercus spp.), Douglas fir (Pseudotsuga menziesii), ponderosa pine (Pinus ponderosa), sugar pine (Pinus lambertiana), and white fir (Abies concolor). In Europe it is often found with holm oak (Quercus ilex), strawberry trees (Arbutus andrachne), olive trees (Olea europaea), Spanish fir (Abies pinsapo), Silver fir (Abies alba), Calabrian pine (Pinus brutia), and Scot's pine (P. sylvestris).

Although it was initially hypothesised that collections of M. tridentina from Turkey might have been antrhopogenically introduced from the Pacific Northwest of North America, numerous collections reported since from remote and undisturbed areas in the Mediterranean and the Alps (including Bresadola's original collection from Trentino), suggest a long-time and well-established presence of this species in Europe. According to a 2021 study by Loizides and colleagues revising the evolutionary history of Morchella, this species is more likely to be a climatic relict, whose once wider distribution probably became fragmented during the Quaternary glaciations.
