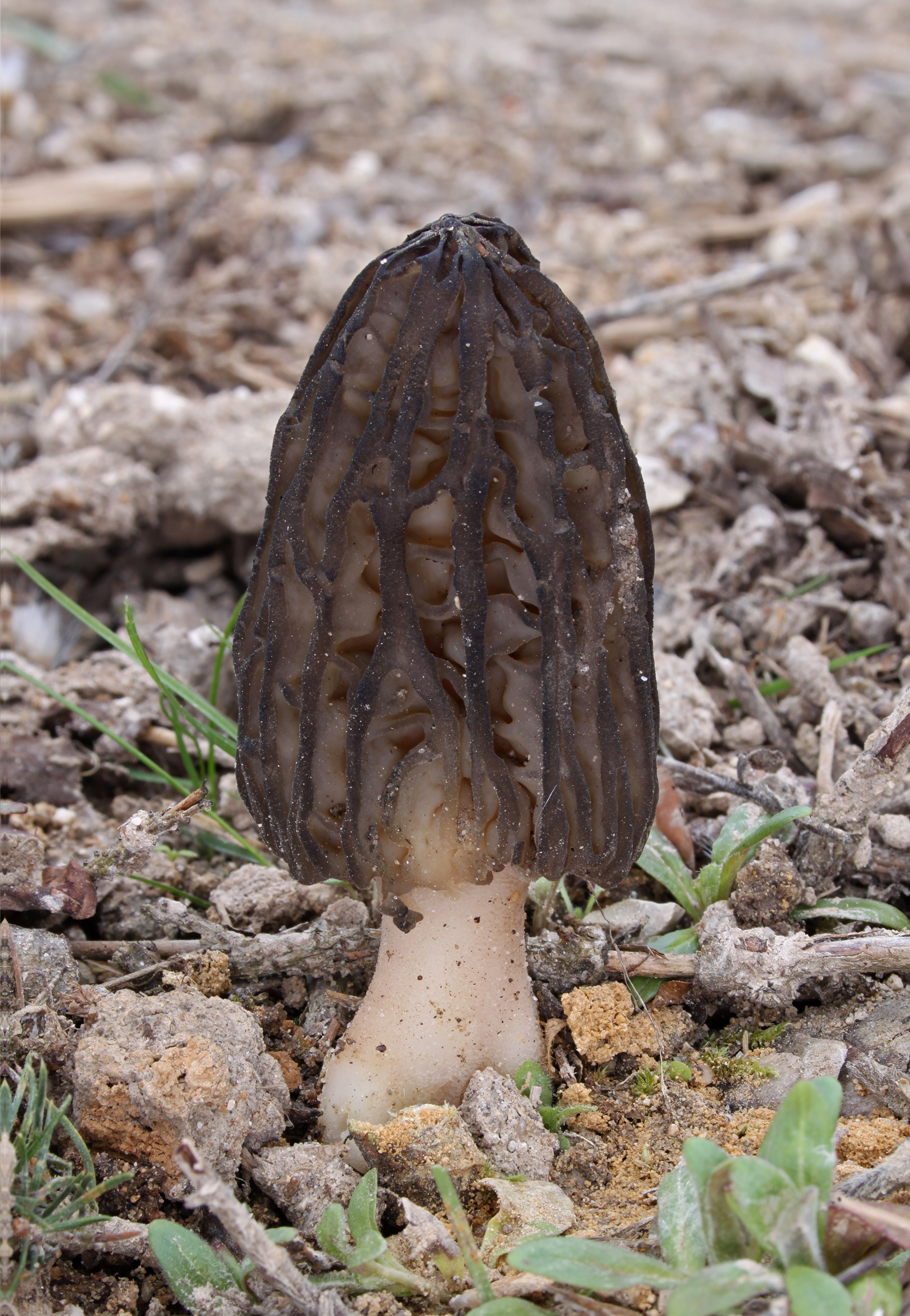
- Black morel near Ulm, Germany

Conservation status
- Secure (NatureServe)

Scientific classification
- Kingdom: Fungi
- Division: Ascomycota
- Class: Pezizomycetes
- Order: Pezizales
- Family: Morchellaceae
- Genus: Morchella
- Species: M. elata

Binomial name
- Morchella elata Fr. (1822)

= Morchella elata =

Species of fungus

Morchella elata
- Mycological characteristics
- Smooth hymenium
- Cap is conical
- Hymenium attachment is not applicable
- Stipe is bare
- Spore print is cream
- Ecology is mycorrhizal or saprotrophic
- Edibility is choice or can cause allergic reactions

Morchella elata is a species of fungus in the family Morchellaceae. It is one of many related species commonly known as black morels, and until 2012 the name M. elata was broadly applied to black morels throughout the globe. Like most members of the genus, M. elata is a popular edible fungus and is sought by many mushroom hunters.

== Taxonomy ==
The fruit bodies of Morchella species, including M. elata, are highly polymorphic in appearance, exhibiting variations in shape, color and size; this has contributed to uncertainties regarding taxonomy. Discriminating between the various species is complicated by uncertainty regarding which species are truly biologically distinct. Mushroom hunters refer to them by their color as the species are very similar in appearance and vary considerably within species and age of individual.

Early phylogenetic analyses supported the hypothesis that the genus comprises only a few species with considerable phenotypic variation. More recent DNA work, however, has revealed more than a dozen distinct groups of morels in North America, and over 60 worldwide. An extensive DNA study showed three discrete clades, or genetic groups, consisting of the black morels (M. elata and others), the yellow morels (M. esculenta and others), and the white morels (M. rufobrunnea and M. anatolica). Species within the Elata clade (also referred to as Distantes), are characterised by the gradual darkening of their sterile ridges upon maturity, with the exception of M. tridentina (=M. frustrata), which has persistently pale ridges. Within the black and yellow clades, there are dozens of individual species, many endemic to individual continents or regions. This species-rich view is supported by studies in North America, Western Europe, Turkey, Israel, the Himalayas, and China.

The scientific name Morchella elata was proposed by Elias Magnus Fries from Sweden in 1822. DNA analysis in 2011 has shown North American black morels to be largely distinct from European species, therefore restricting the use of the M. elata name to Europe. In 2012, Kuo et al. provided names for many of the North American black morels that may have been referred to as M. elata in the past. However, in a subsequent study by Richard et al. (2014) proposing a unified taxonomy for the genus, it is suggested that Fries' original description of Morchella elata may correspond to phylogenetic lineage Mel-10, which has been since described from North America as Morchella importuna, but later shown to have a widespread transcontinental distribution.

The variety M. elata var. purpurescens, characterised by the purple- or pink-colored tinges of its ascocarps, is now considered to belong to a phylogenetically distinct lineage (Richard et al. 2014).

Eastern North America

- M. angusticeps
- M. septentrionalis

Western North America

- M. brunnea
- M. capitata
- M. importuna
- M. septimelata
- M. sextelata
- M. snyderi
- M. tomentosa

== Description ==
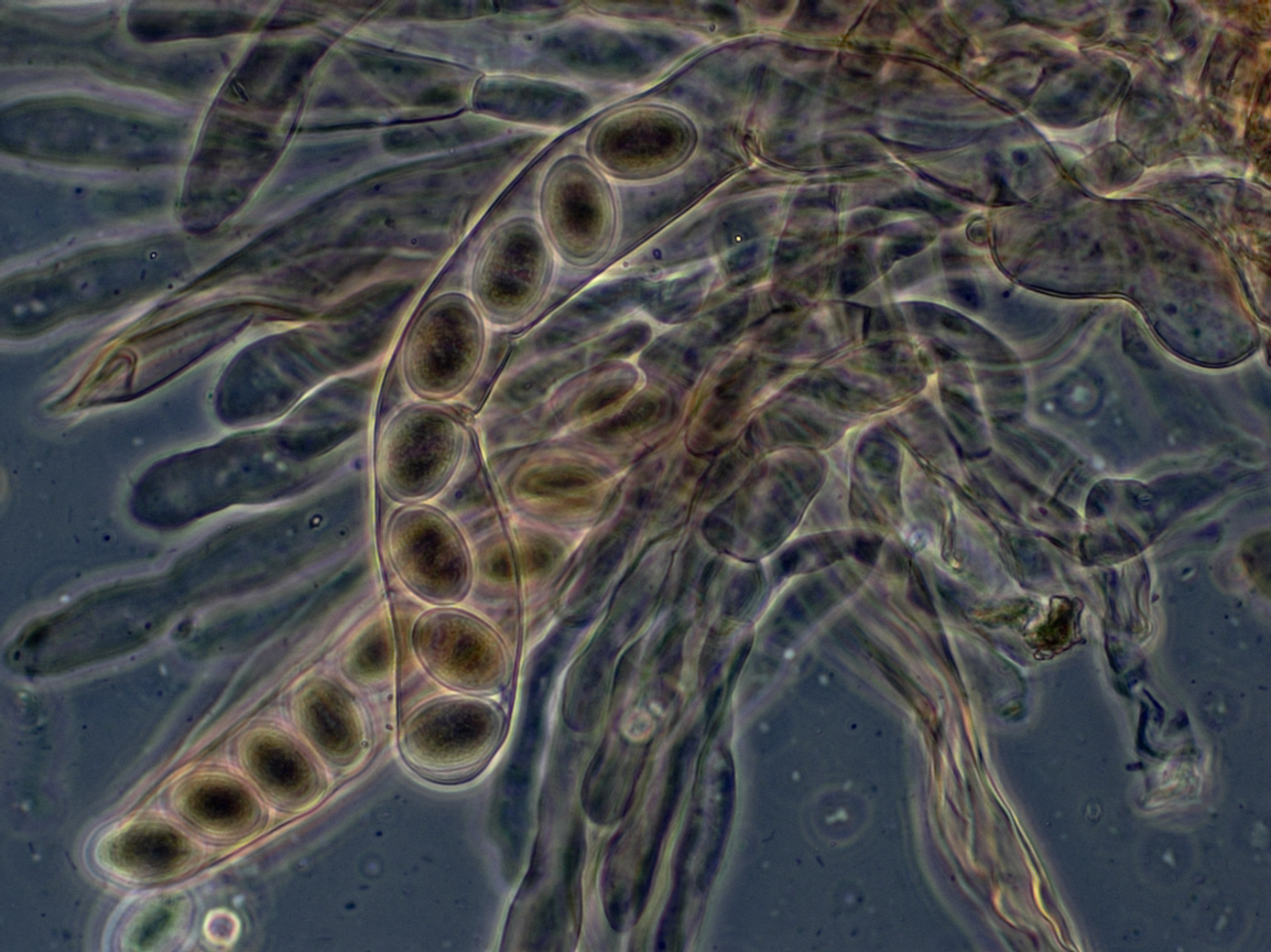
Morchella asci viewed with phase contrast microscopy

Morchella elata has operculate asci (i.e., asci opening by an apical lid to discharge the spores). It further has unicellular hyaline ascospores with polar oil droplets.

Despite the fact that many interpretations of M. elata exist throughout the years, most authors agree that Fries' original concept refers to a species with dark, conical ascocarps and more or less parallel vertical ridges, with horizontal interconnecting ridges arranged in a "ladderlike" pattern.

== Ecology and distribution ==
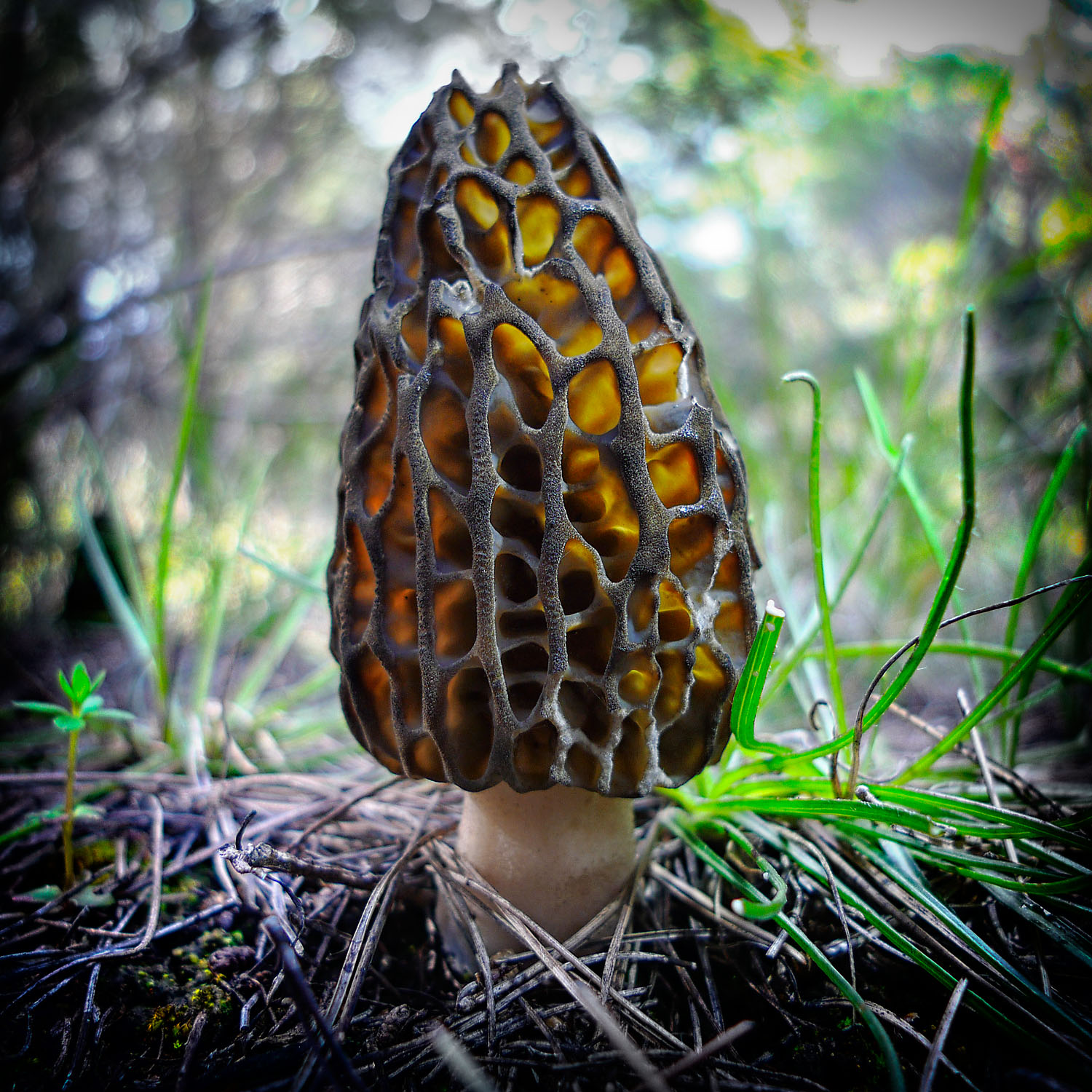
Morchella elata var. purpurascens, Mount Parnitha

Morchella elata fruits during spring on soil. Fries' original description, which was based on a collection from a fir wood in Sweden, reported it as rare: "In silvis abiegnis, praecipue locis humidis adustis, raro". However, since the true identity of M. elata is not yet fully clarified, its exact ecological preferences and distribution remain unclear.

== Toxicity ==
Morels may contain small amounts of monomethylhydrazine (the presence of hydrazine based mycotoxins is controversial since there are no primary references of these substances having been detected in the genus Morchella) or more likely an unknown toxin that is destroyed through cooking, so morel mushrooms should never be eaten raw. It has been reported that even cooked morels can sometimes cause mild adverse effects when consumed with alcohol.

== Uses ==
This is an edible species, although like other morels, some individuals may be allergic to it, so it must be cooked before being eaten. It can also be dried for later use. However, according to one field guide it may cause gastrointestinal disorder, and cannot easily be identified without a microscope.

== See also ==
- False morel
- Cryptic species complex
