= Black morel =

Several species of fungi share the name black morel:

- Morchella angusticeps (L.) Pers. (1801)
- Morchella conica Pers.
- Morchella elata Fr. (1822)
- Morchella tomentosa M.Kuo (2008), the black foot morel
