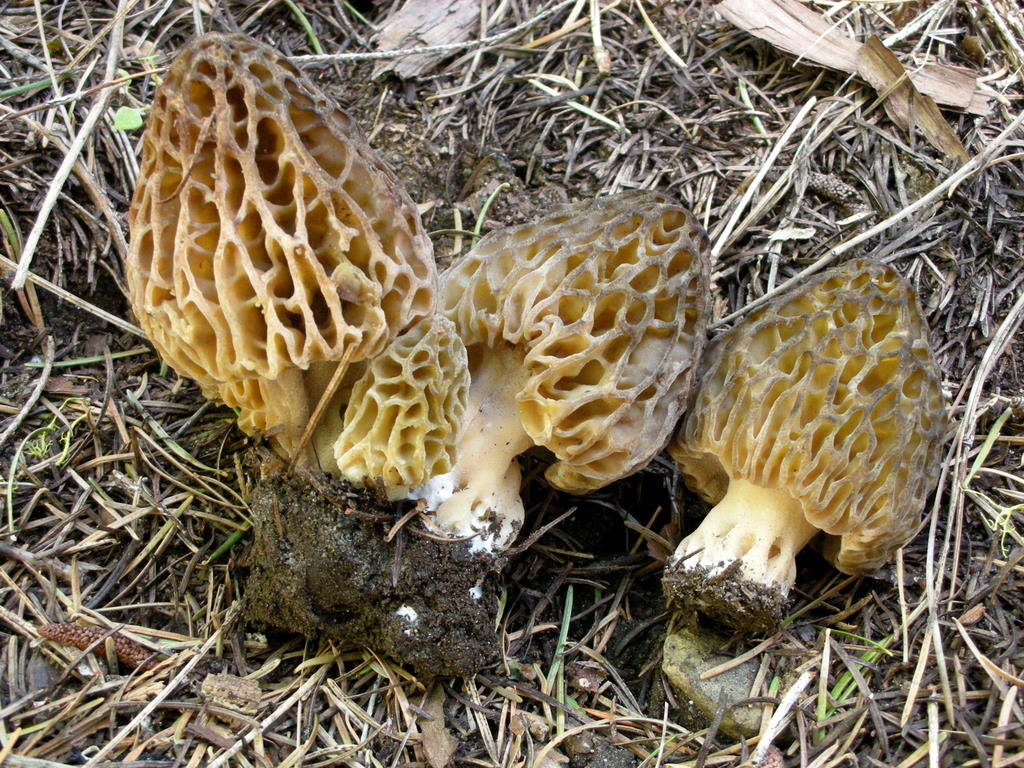

Scientific classification
- Kingdom: Fungi
- Division: Ascomycota
- Class: Pezizomycetes
- Order: Pezizales
- Family: Morchellaceae
- Genus: Morchella
- Species: M. snyderi

Binomial name
- Morchella snyderi M.Kuo & Methven (2012)

= Morchella snyderi =

Species of fungus

Morchella snyderi is a species of fungus in the family Morchellaceae. Described as new to science in 2012, it occurs in the montane forests of western North America, including California, Idaho, Montana, Oregon and Washington. It produces fruit bodies up to 14 cm (5.5 in) tall with ridged and pitted conical caps, and stipes that become pitted in maturity. The color of the morel is yellow to tan when young, but the cap ridges become brown to black in maturity or when dried.

== Taxonomy ==
Morchella snyderi was described as new to science in 2012, along with 13 other morels from the United States and Canada. The study, published in the journal Mycologia, resulted from the Morel Data Collection Project, which aimed to help clarify the taxonomy, biology, and distribution of morel species in North America. The specific epithet honors Leon C. Snyder, who described similar morels in Washington state in the 1930s. According to Michael Kuo, who coauthored the species description, the morel should have been named Morchella crassistipa, as it was previously described by Snyder in 1938, from collections made in Washington. However, molecular analysis determined that Snyder's type collection contained two distinct species, rendering the validity of the taxon dubious. M. snyderi was also previously identified as phylogenetic species Mel-12 (i.e., defined by DNA sequence) in a 2011 study.

Despite the light coloration of young fruit bodies, Morchella snyderi groups in the elata clade (named after the European black morel M. elata) along with other "black" morels such as M. angusticeps and M. tomentosa. Morphological characteristics of morels in this clade include pits on the cap that are usually elongated vertically in mature fruit bodies, and often the presence of a sinus (a space or indentation) where the cap attaches to the stipe.

== Description ==
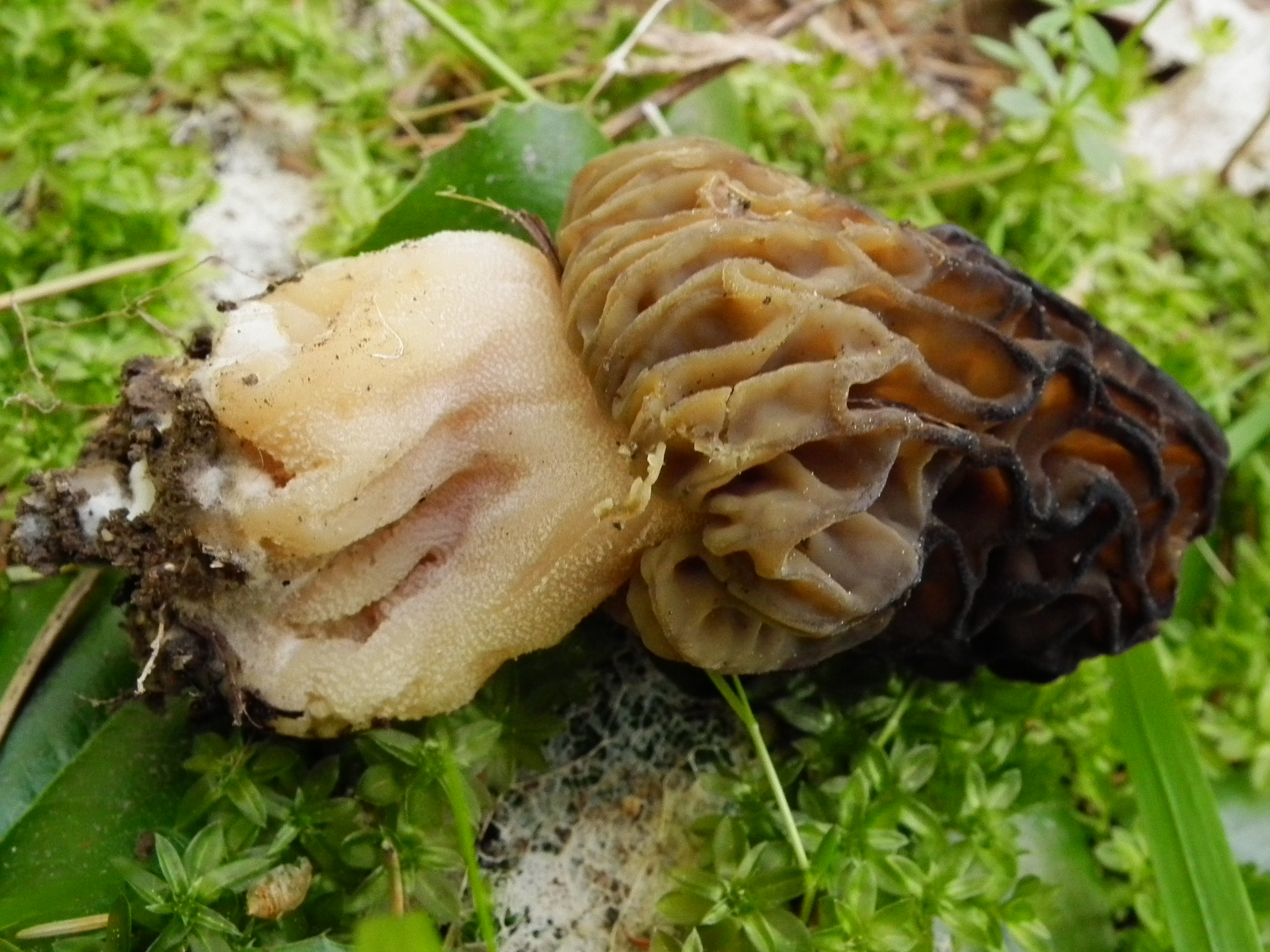
The stipe becomes pocketed (lacunose) in maturity. In this specimen, the cap ridges are tan where they were buried in the plant litter, and black where they were exposed.

The fruit bodies are 6–14 cm (2.4–5.5 in) high. The conical cap is 3.5–8 cm (1.4–3.1 in) high and 3–5 cm (1.2–2.0 in) wide at the widest point. The cap surface features pits and ridges, formed by the intersection of 16–22 primary vertical ridges and frequent shorter, secondary vertical ridges, with occasional sunken, horizontal ridges. The cap is attached to the stipe with a sinus about 2–4 mm deep and 2–4 mm wide. The ridges are smooth or very finely tomentose (covered with densely matted filaments). They are initially pale yellowish, becoming pale tan, then grayish brown in maturity, eventually darkening to nearly black when dried. They are flattened when young but sometimes become sharpened or eroded in maturity. The pits are somewhat elongated vertically (particularly when mature). They are finely tomentose, yellowish when young, becoming pale tan to pale grayish brown. Fruit bodies are often found in a transitional stage where the upper part of the cap has turned dark while the lower part remains light.

The whitish to pale brownish stipe is 3.5–7 cm (1.4–2.8 in) long by 2.5–4 cm (1.0–1.6 in) wide and is roughly equal in width throughout its length, or sometimes slightly thicker near the base. Its surface, initially covered with whitish granules, becomes more granulated as the mushroom ages, and typically develops prominent ridges and pits (i.e., becomes lacunose) with maturity. The flesh is whitish, measuring 1–2 mm thick in the hollow cap; it becomes layered and chambered, particularly in the base of the stipe. The sterile inner surface of the cap is whitish and pubescent (covered with short, soft "hair").

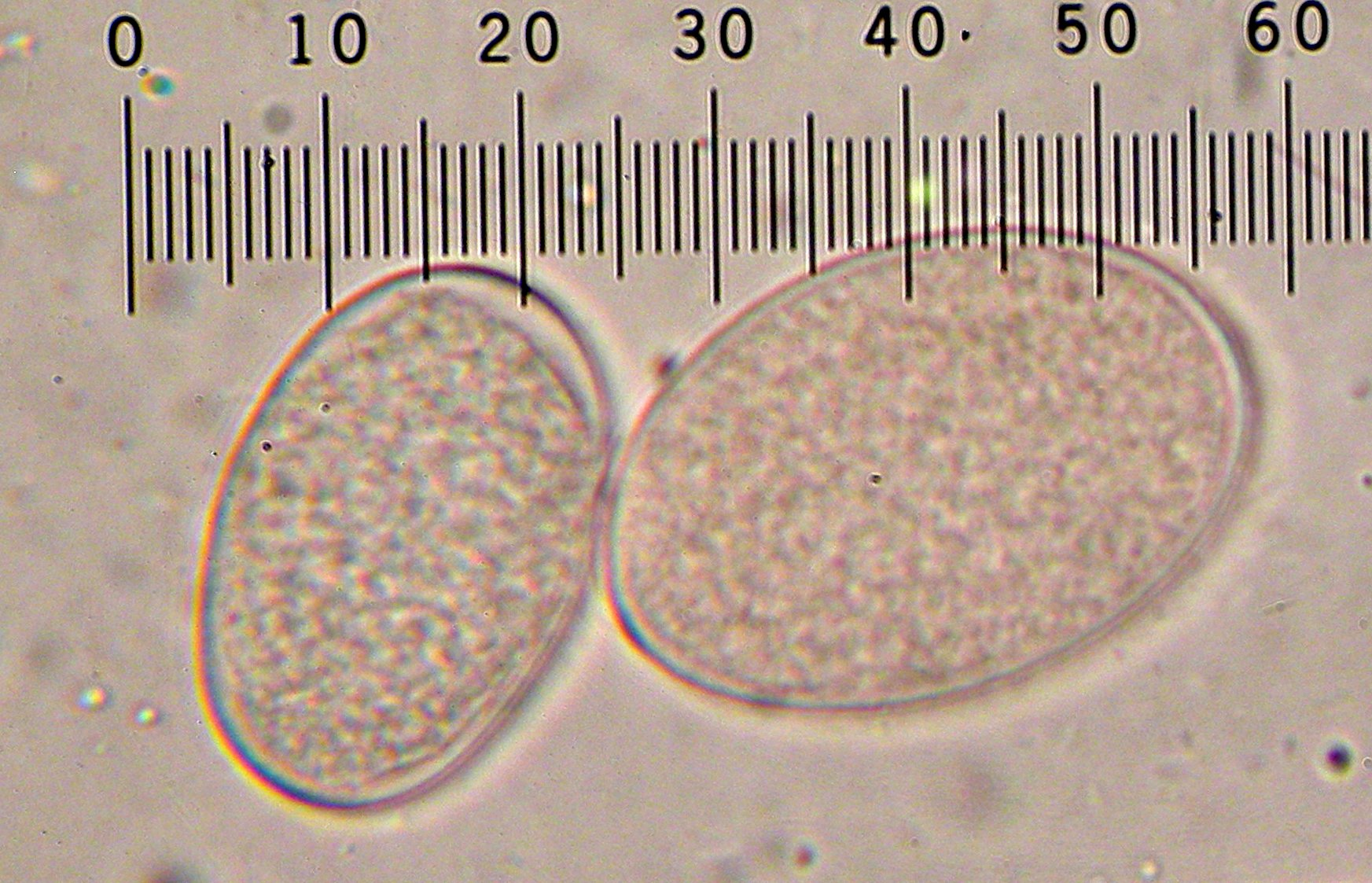
The smooth, elliptical spores measure up to 37 μm.

The ascospores of M. snyderi are elliptical and smooth, measuring 25–37 by 15–23 μm. Asci (spore-bearing cells) are eight-spored, cylindrical, and measure 225–300 by 7.5–32.5 μm. Paraphyses are cylindrical, septate, and measure 100–200 by 7.5–20 μm. Their tips are variably shaped, from rounded to club-shaped, to fuse-shaped. The contents of the paraphyses are hyaline (translucent) to faintly brownish in dilute potassium hydroxide (KOH). Hyphae on the sterile cap ridges are septate and measure 75–175 by 10–20 μm. The terminal cells are variably shaped (similar to the paraphyses), and have hyaline to brownish contents in KOH.

North American Morchella are generally considered choice edibles, but the edibility of M. snyderi was not mentioned in its original description.

=== Similar species ===
Morchella snyderi can be distinguished from similar North American morels by differences in ecological and morphological features. M. tridentina resembles young specimens of M. snyderi, but the ridges of the caps of the former species do not darken in maturity, and it has smaller ascospores, measuring 20–29 by 14–19 μm. Another potential lookalike, M. brunnea, has a browner fruit body color in young specimens, and a stipe that is not lacunose.

== Habitat, distribution, and ecology ==
Morchella snyderi is suspected of being both saprobic and mycorrhizal at different stages in its life cycle. Fruit bodies grow singly, scattered, or in groups on the ground under conifers, particularly Douglas fir (Pseudotsuga menziesii), ponderosa pine (Pinus ponderosa) and white fir (Abies concolor). Fruiting occurs from April to June. The fungus has been collected in California, Idaho, Montana, Oregon, Washington, New Mexico, and Arizona. M. snyderi, identified as phylogenetic species Mel-12, has been shown to colonize the non-native species Bromus tectorum (cheatgrass) as an endophyte. This is hypothesized to be a contributing factor in the success of cheatgrass as an invasive species in western North America.
