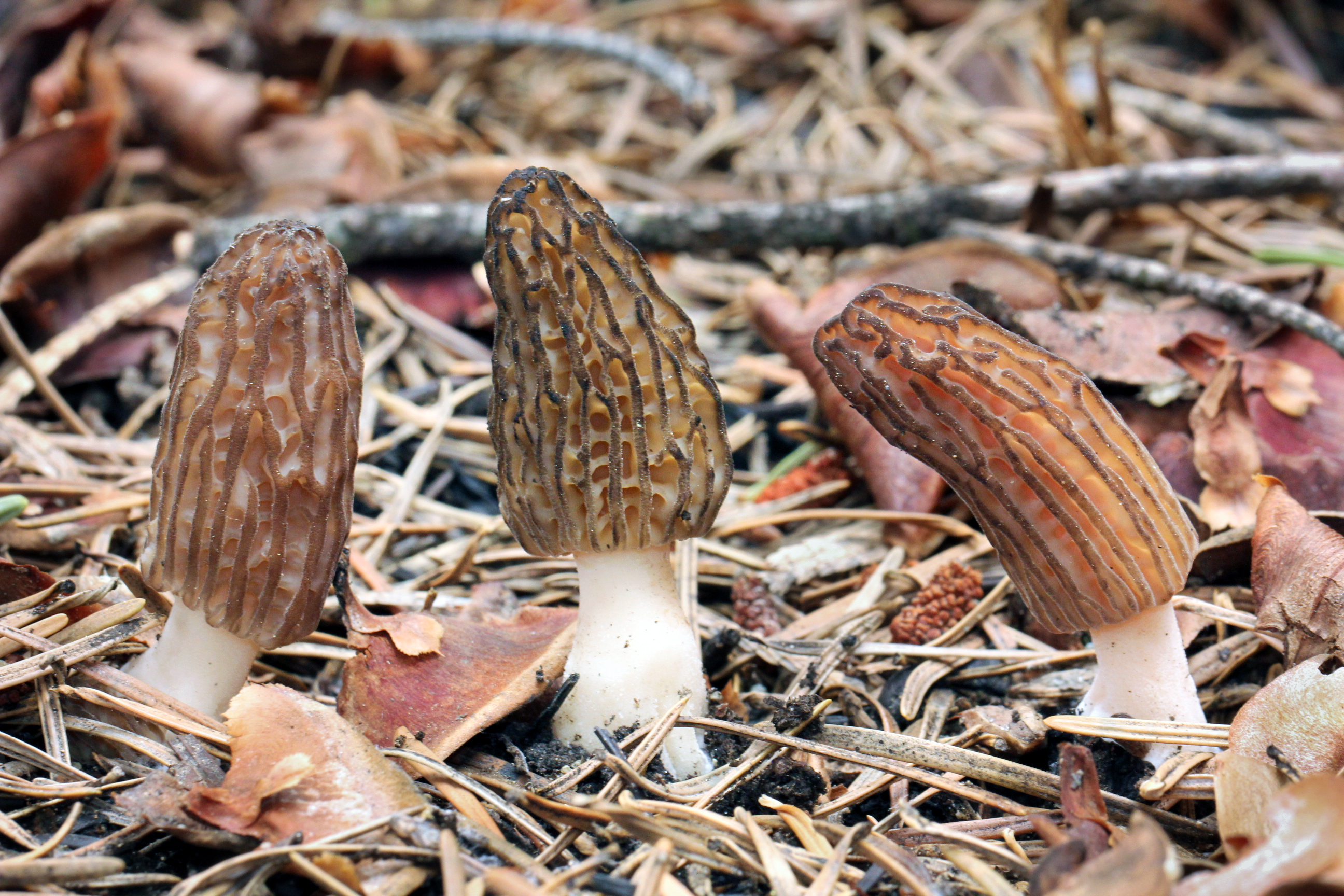

Scientific classification
- Kingdom: Fungi
- Division: Ascomycota
- Class: Pezizomycetes
- Order: Pezizales
- Family: Morchellaceae
- Genus: Morchella
- Species: M. sextelata

Binomial name
- Morchella sextelata M.Kuo (2012)

= Morchella sextelata =

Species of fungus

Morchella sextelata is a species of ascomycete fungus in the family Morchellaceae described as new to science in 2012.

The fruit bodies have a roughly conical cap up to 7.5 cm (3 in) tall and 5 cm (2 in) wide, with a surface of mostly vertically arranged pits. The cap is initially yellowish to brownish, but it darkens to become almost black in maturity. The stipe is white and hollow, measuring 2–5 cm (3/4–2 in) high by 1–2.2 cm (1/2–3/4 in) wide. The species cannot be reliably distinguished from close relatives without the use of DNA analysis.

Morchella sextelata is found in western North America. It has also been found in China, but it is unknown if it was accidentally introduced there.

== Taxonomy ==
Morchella sextelata was originally identified as phylogenetic species "Mel-6" in the species-rich Elata clade (brown morels) elucidated by microbiologist Kerry O'Donnell and colleagues in a 2011 publication. The specific epithet sextelata alludes to this preliminary name. Although M. sextelata is not distinguishable from Morchella septimelata on physical or ecological characteristics, they are clearly genetically distinct species, and can be differentiated by comparing DNA sequences or with restriction fragment length polymorphism analysis. Allopatric speciation is thought to have been the driving evolutionary force that caused M. sextelata to diverge from its ancestors roughly 25 million years ago. The original specimens collected were obtained as part of the Morel Data Collection Project, a research effort designed to improve the understanding of North American morels.

== Description ==
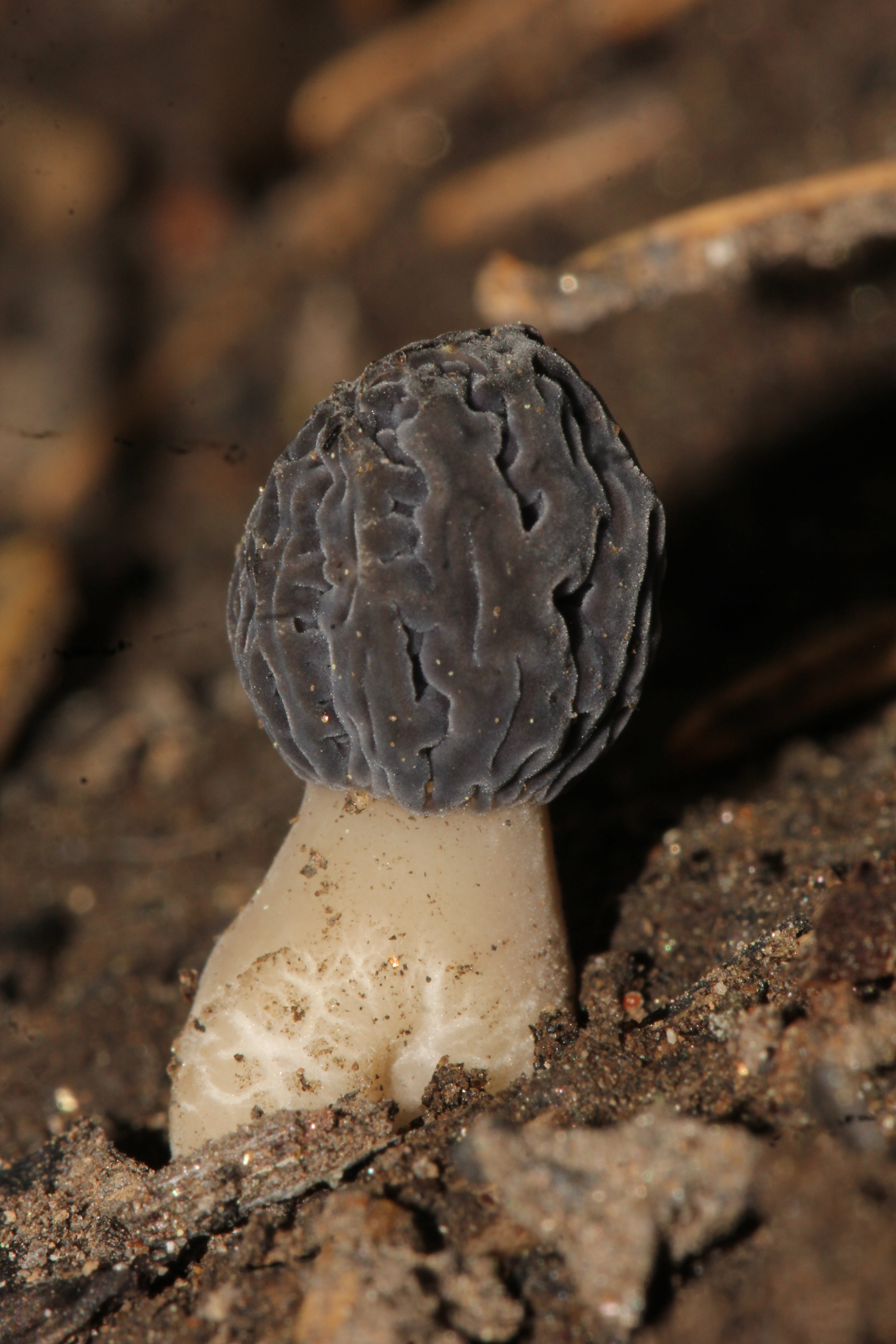
Immature fruit body

The fruit bodies of Morchella sextelata are 4–10.5 cm (1 1/2–4 1/4 in) high with a conical cap that is 2.5–7.5 cm (1–3 in) high and 2–5 cm (3/4–2 in) wide at the widest point. The cap surface features pits and ridges, formed by the intersection of 12–20 primary vertical ridges and frequent shorter, secondary vertical ridges, with occasional sunken, horizontal ridges. The cap is attached to the stipe with a sinus about 2–4 mm deep and 2–4 mm wide. The ridges are smooth or very finely tomentose (covered with densely matted filaments). They are initially colorless, becoming pale tan, then dark grayish brown in maturity, eventually darkening to nearly black. They are flattened when young but sometimes become sharpened or eroded in maturity. The pits are somewhat elongated vertically. They are smooth, brownish to yellowish tan to pinkish to buff.

The whitish to pale brownish stipe is 2–5 cm (3/4–2 in) long by 1.0–2.2 cm (1/2–3/4 in) wide and is roughly equal in width throughout its length, or sometimes slightly club-shaped near the base. Its surface is either smooth or covered with whitish granules. The flesh is whitish, measuring 1–2 mm thick in the hollow cap; it may become layered and chambered in the base of the stipe. The sterile inner surface of the cap is whitish and pubescent (covered with short, soft "hair").

The ascospores of M. sextelata are elliptical and smooth, typically measuring 18–25 by 10–16 μm. Asci (spore-bearing cells) are eight-spored, hyaline (translucent), cylindrical, and measure 200–325 by 5–25 μm. Paraphyses are cylindrical, septate, and measure 175–300 by 2–15 μm. Their tips are variably shaped, from rounded, to club-shaped, to fuse-shaped. The contents of the paraphyses are hyaline (translucent) to faintly brownish in dilute potassium hydroxide (KOH). Hyphae on the sterile cap ridges are septate and measure 50–180 by 5–25 μm. The terminal cells are variably shaped (similar to the paraphyses), and have brownish contents in KOH.

North American Morchella are generally considered choice edibles, but the edibility of M. sextelata was not mentioned in its original description.

=== Similar species ===
Morchella sextelata is morphologically indistinguishable from several other morel species in the M. elata clade, including M. septimelata, M. brunnea, M. angusticeps, and M. septentrionalis. M. septimelata can be distinguished from these latter three lookalikes by habitat or distribution: M. brunnea is found in non-burned forests of western North America; M. angusticeps is found east of the Rocky Mountains; and M. septentrionalis is restricted to a northern distribution (about 44°N northward) in eastern North America. M. septimelata, however, also grows in burn sites and so is both morphologically and ecologically indistinguishable from M. sextelata. Although there are subtle differences in the structure of the sterile ridges between the species, the authors were not confident that enough specimens had been examined to establish that these differences were consistent.

== Habitat, distribution, and ecology ==
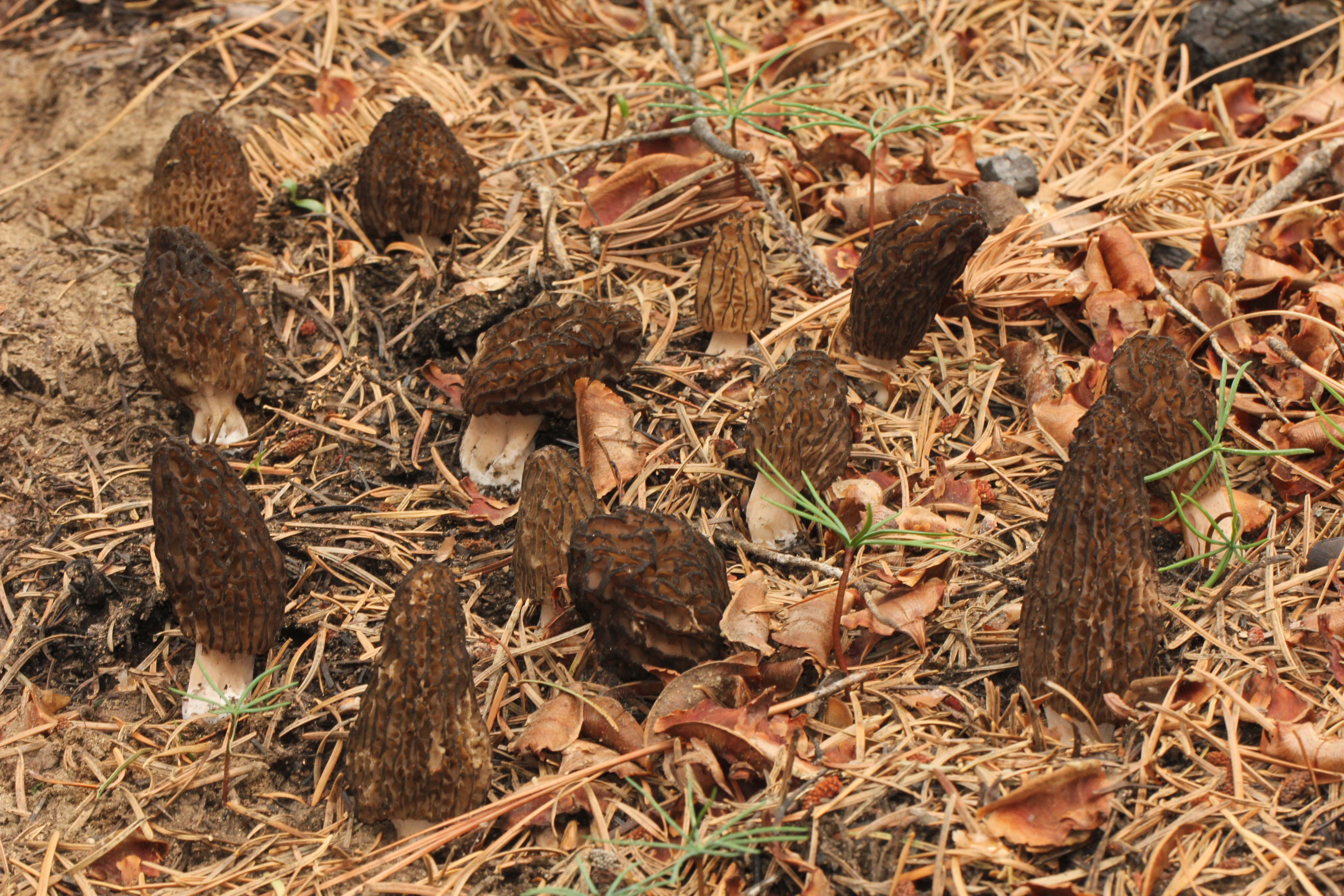
A group of fruit bodies in Yosemite National Park, California, in an area burned by the 2013 Rim Fire

Morchella sextelata may be either saprobic or mycorrhizal at different times in its life cycle. Its fruit bodies grow in partially burned conifer forests, particularly those dominated by Douglas-fir (Pseudotsuga menziesii) and ponderosa pine (Pinus ponderosa). They tend to appear in great numbers the year immediately following fire and appear in decreasing frequency in successive years. Fruiting occurs from April through July, at elevations between 1,000 and 1,500 m (3,300 and 4,900 ft). The distribution includes Washington, Idaho, Montana, Wyoming, and Yukon Territory. M. sextelata has also been found in China, but it remains unclear whether dispersal between these distant locations occurred naturally or through accidental introduction by humans.

Morchella sextelata, identified as phylogenetic species "Mel-6", has been shown to colonize the non-native species Bromus tectorum (cheatgrass) as an endophyte, increasing the overall growth of the grass, as well as the abundance of seeds and their tolerance to extreme heat (60–65 °C or 140–149 °F). This has been hypothesized to be a contributing factor in the success of cheatgrass as an invasive species in western North America.

It is one of four species of wildfire-adapted morels in western North America, the others being M. capitata, M. septimelata, and M. tomentosa.
