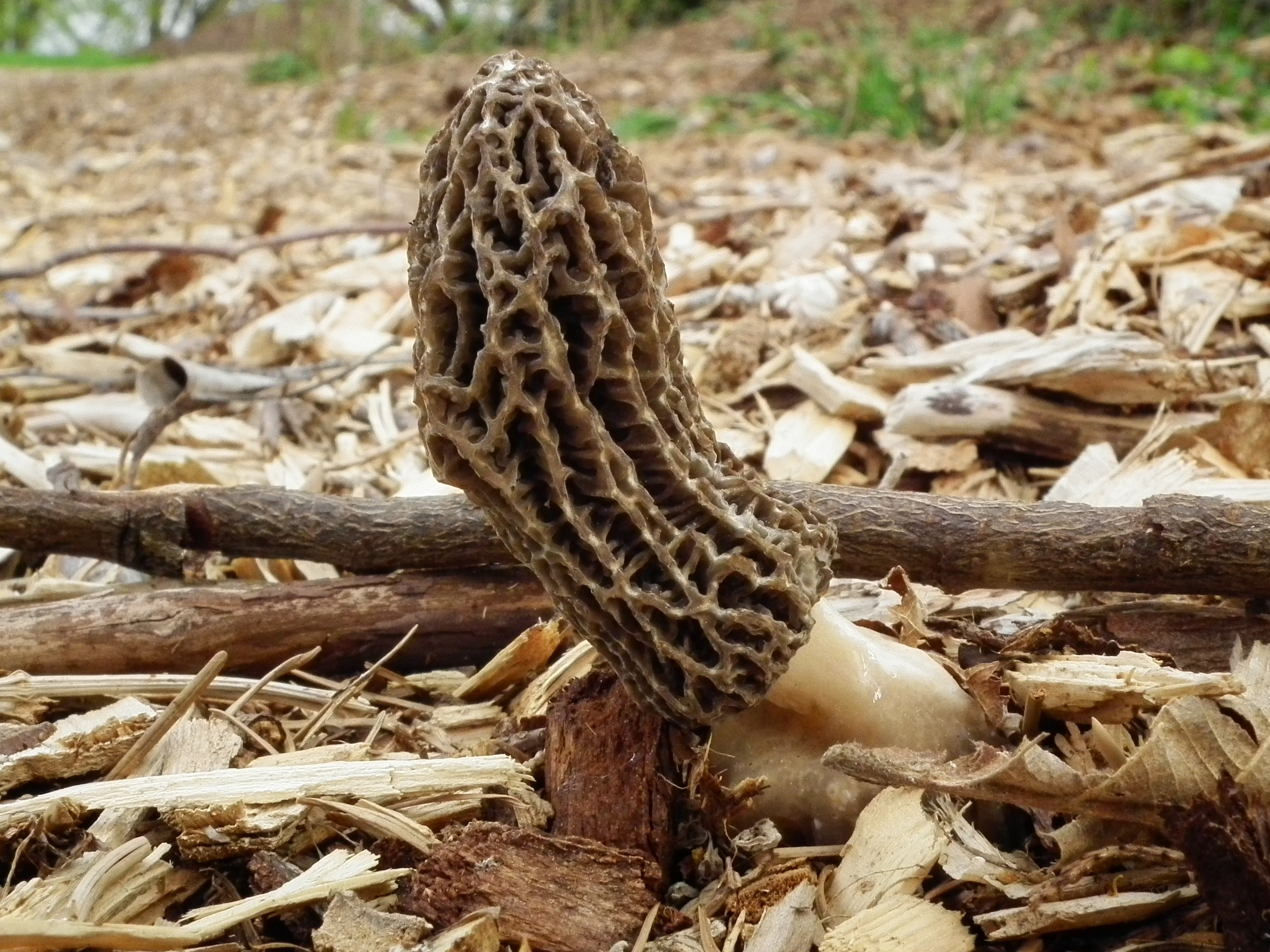
- Morchella importuna in Seattle, Washington, USA

Scientific classification
- Kingdom: Fungi
- Division: Ascomycota
- Class: Pezizomycetes
- Order: Pezizales
- Family: Morchellaceae
- Genus: Morchella
- Species: M. importuna

Binomial name
- Morchella importuna M.Kuo, O'Donnell & T.J.Volk (2012)

= Morchella importuna =

Species of fungus

Morchella importuna is a species of fungus in the family Morchellaceae described from North America in 2012. It occurs in gardens, woodchip beds, and other urban settings of northern California and the Pacific Northwest region of the United States and Canada. The fungus has also been reported from Turkey, Spain, France, Switzerland, and China, although it is unknown whether this is a result of accidental introductions. It is considered a choice edible mushroom. The fruit bodies develop a distinctive ladder-like pattern of pits and ridges on the surface of their conical caps.

== Taxonomy ==
Officially described in 2012, Morchella importuna was one of 14 new North American species that resulted from the Morel Data Collection Project. The type locality was in King County, Washington. It was previously identified as phylogenetic species Mel-10 in a 2011 publication, and erroneously as the "Classic North American Black Morel" in 2005, where it was lumped together with Morchella angusticeps, and what has since been described as M. brunnea. The specific epithet importuna, which means "inconsiderate" or "assertive", refers to the morel's habit of causing "consternation and distress among gardeners and homeowners whose territory has been invaded".

As argued in a recent study by Richard et al. however, the name Morchella importuna is probably a later synonym of an old European taxon, such as Morchella elata, Morchella vaporaria or Morchella hortensis.

== Description ==
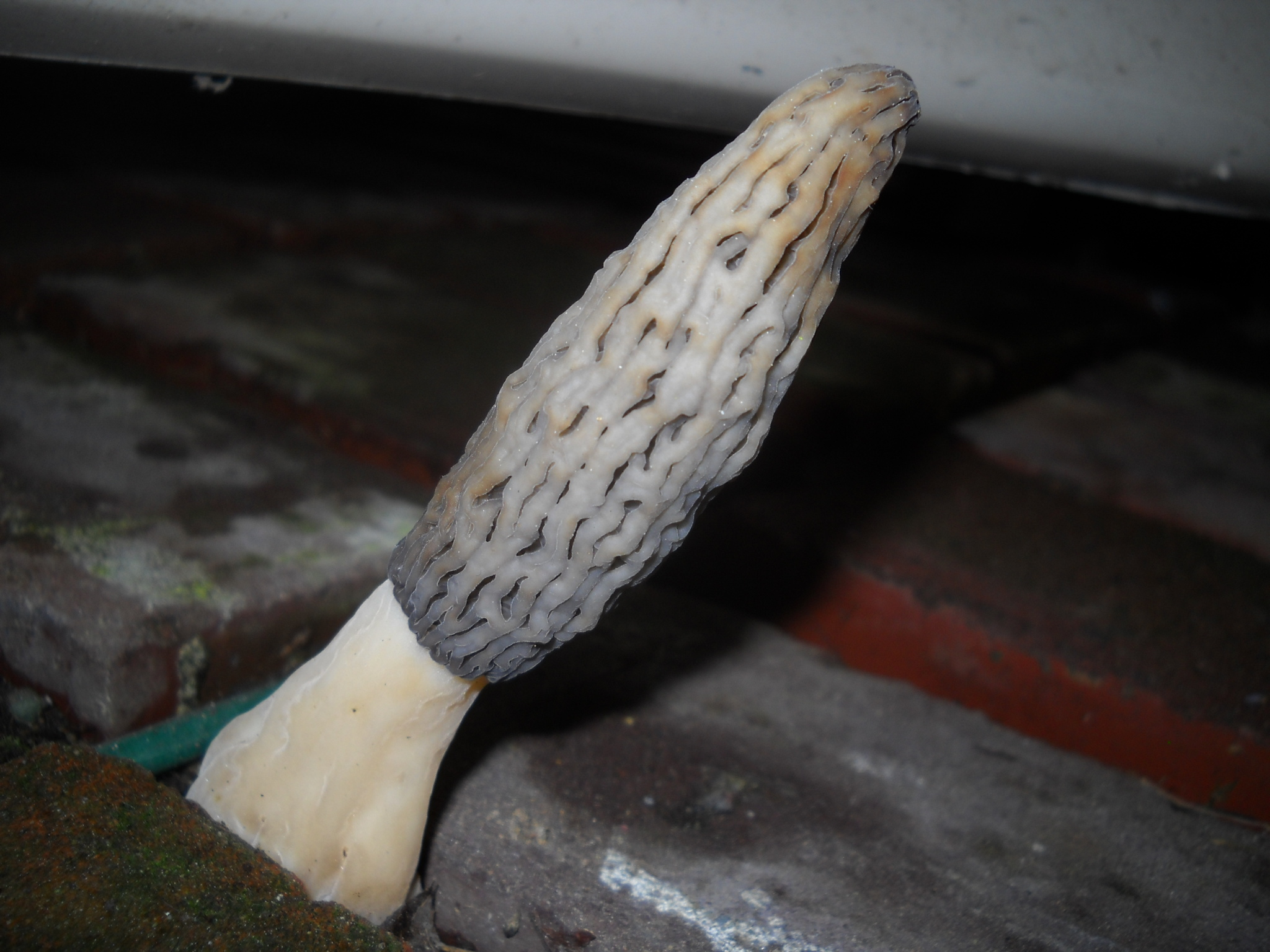
In immature fruit bodies, the cap ridges are rounded and the color predominantly grayish.

The fruit bodies of M. importuna are 6–20 cm (2.4–7.9 in) high. The cap is 3–15 cm (1.2–5.9 in) high and measures 2–9 cm (0.8–3.5 in) wide at its widest point. It is conical to widely conical or occasionally egg-shaped. Its surface has pits and ridges, with 12–20 primary vertical ridges and numerous transecting horizontal ridges, creating a laddered appearance. The cap is attached to stipe with a sinus about 2–5 mm both deep and wide. The ridges are smooth or finely velvety and colored pale to dark gray when young, becoming dark grayish brown to nearly black in age. They are bluntly rounded when young, but later become sharpened or eroded. Pits are vertically elongated in all stages of development. They have a smooth or finely velvety texture. The pits open and deepen with development, progressing from gray to dark gray when immature to grayish brown, grayish olive or brownish yellow at maturity. The stipe measures 3–10 cm (1.2–3.9 in) high and 2–6 cm (0.8–2.4 in) wide, and is often somewhat thicker near the base. Its whitish to pale brownish surface is smooth or finely mealy with whitish granules. It develops longitudinal ridges and grooves (particularly near the base) as the fruit body matures. The flesh is whitish to watery tan, measuring 1–3 mm thick in the hollow cap; in the stipe, this tissue is sometimes arranged as chambers or layers. The sterile inner surface of the cap is whitish and pubescent (covered with short soft "hair").

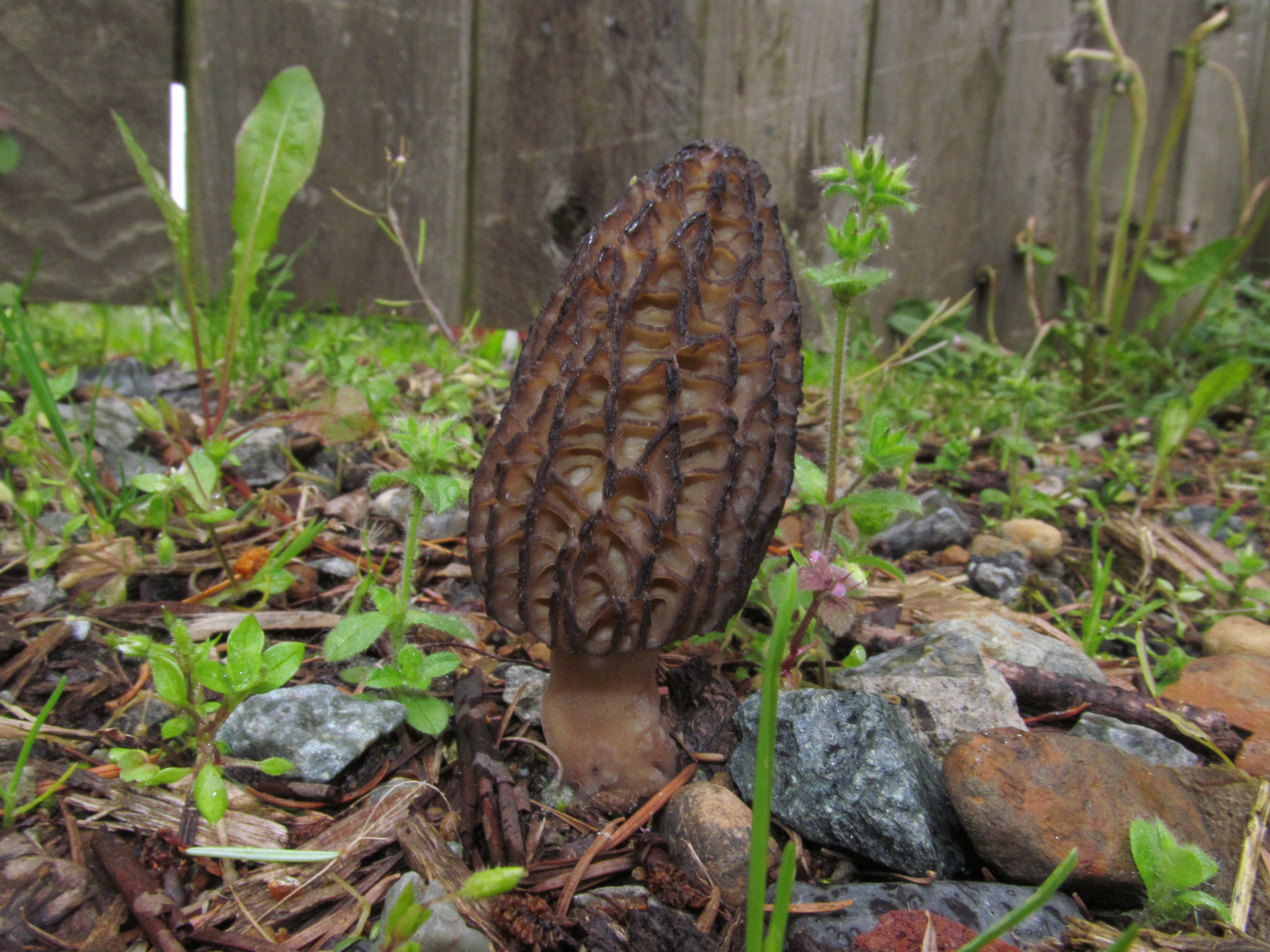
Morchella importuna is found in urban settings such as gardens and wood chip beds.

The ascospores are elliptical, smooth, and measure 18–24 by 10–13 μm. The cylindrical, hyaline (translucent), asci are eight-spored, measuring 220–300 by 12–25 μm. Paraphyses are septate, measuring 150–250 by 7–15 μm. They are cylindrical with variably shaped tips: rounded to roughly club-shaped, pointy, or fuse-shaped. Elements on the sterile ridges are septate and measure 25–300 by 10–30 μm. Terminal cells are cylindrical with a rounded tip that is variably shaped similar to the paraphyses. Both the paraphyses and the terminal cells are hyaline or brownish in dilute (2%) potassium hydroxide.

As a member of the Morchella elata group of black morels, M. importuna is sought after as a choice edible mushroom. Raw morels are poisonous and should always be cooked.

=== Similar species ===
The rare Pacific Northwest morel Morchella hotsonii, known only from its type collection, is quite similar in appearance to M. importuna. The former species is distinguished by its finely velvety surface.

== Habitat, distribution, and ecology ==
A saprobic fungus, Morchella importuna fruit bodies grow in wood chips, gardens, fire pits, planters, and almost any disturbed ground in urban areas. Kuo suggests that it has mycorrhizal tendencies when grown in an environment with trees. Known primarily from northern California and the Pacific Northwest region of the United States, it has been reported from British Columbia (Canada), California, Washington, Nevada, and Oregon, although there have been a few isolated reports of the morel from the Midwestern United States and from eastern North America. Fruiting occurs in the spring, from March until May. Identified as phylogenetic species "Mel-10", Morchella importuna has also been found in Turkey and China, but it remains unclear whether dispersal between these distant locations occurred naturally or through accidental introduction by humans.
