= University of Minnesota Landscape Arboretum =

Horticultural garden and arboretum in Minnesota

- Horticultural Research Center
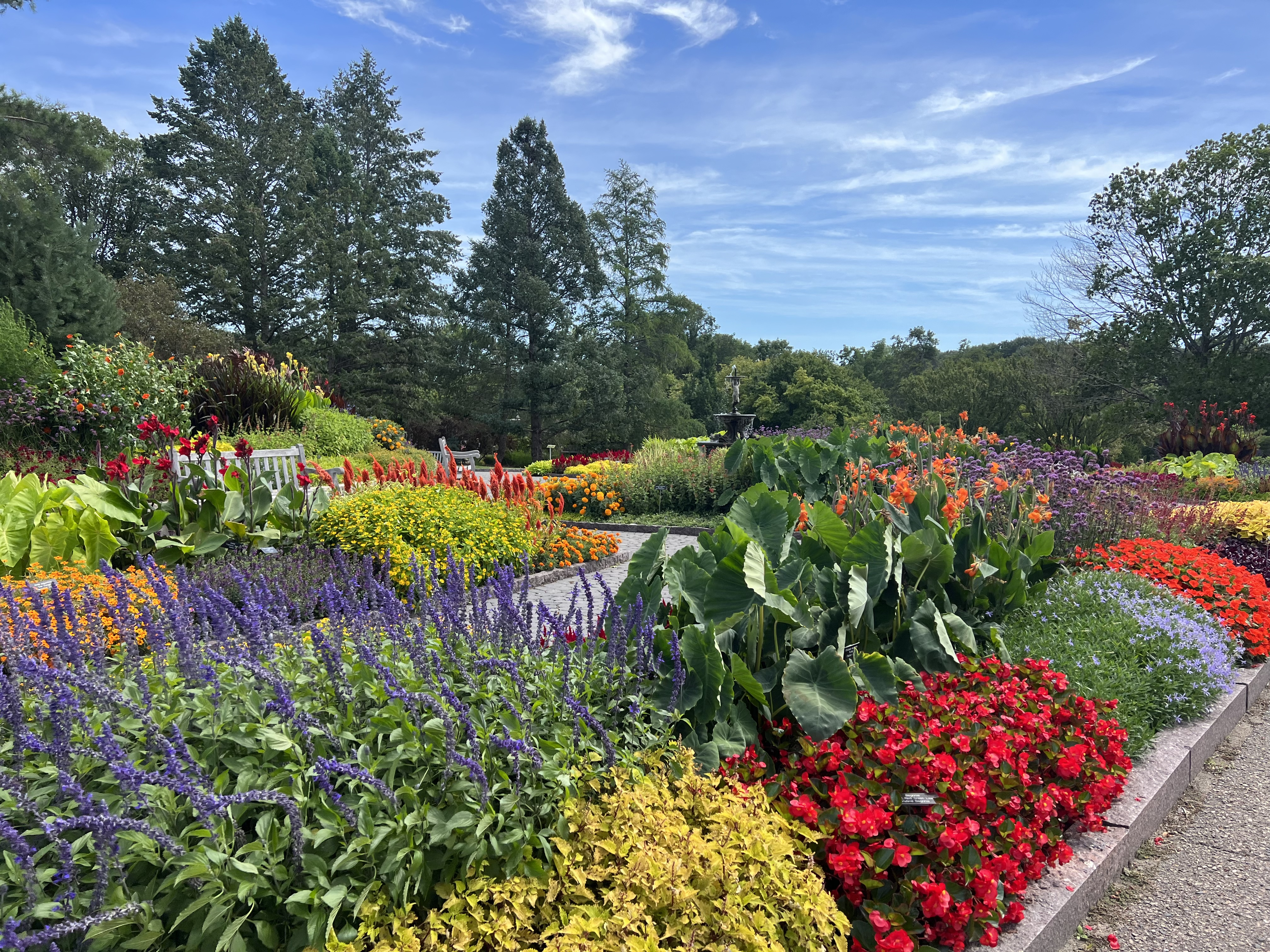
- The annual garden, seen in peak bloom in August 2023, contains over 25,000 plants and is planted with a different style every year.
- Interactive map of University of Minnesota Landscape Arboretum
- Type: Arboretum
- Location: 3675 Arboretum Drive, Chaska, Minnesota
- Coordinates: 44.8619°N 93.6152°W
- Area: 1,200 acres (490 ha)
- Established: 1958
- Founder: Leon C. Snyder
- Operator: University of Minnesota
- Open: Open year round
- Status: American Alliance of Museums Accreditation
- Awards: 2019 Best Botanical Garden
- Paths: 3 miles
- Species: 5,900
- Collections: 44
- Budget: $24.3M
- Website: arb.umn.edu

The University of Minnesota Landscape Arboretum is a 1,200-acre (4.9 km^{2}) horticultural garden and arboretum located about 4 miles (6.4 km) west of Chanhassen, Minnesota at 3675 Arboretum Drive, Chaska, Minnesota. It is part of the Department of Horticultural Science in the College of Food, Agricultural and Natural Resource Sciences at the University of Minnesota, and open to the public every day of the year except Thanksgiving and Christmas. An admission fee is charged, and annual memberships are available.

The arboretum's earliest area was established in 1907 as the Horticultural Research Center, which developed cold-hardy crops such as the Honeycrisp apple and Northern Lights azaleas. In 1958 the arboretum itself was begun on 160 acres (0.65 km^{2}) founded by Leon C. Snyder. The arboretum is the largest, most diverse, and most complete horticultural site in Minnesota, with more than 5,000 plant varieties, and approaching its goal of protecting its entire watershed (1,200 acres).

The arboretum features annual and perennial display gardens, plants developed for northern climates, demonstration gardens, a Japanese garden, a maze garden and natural areas including woodlands, prairie and marshes. Its collections include clematis, dahlias, ornamental grasses, hostas, iris, wildflowers, and cultivated and hardy shrub roses. The arboretum also includes a horticultural library and conservatory, as well as miles of hiking and cross-country skiing trails.

The Meyer-Deats Conservatory features bromeliad, orchid, and cactus collections and tropical houseplants. The Andersen Horticultural Library houses 15,000 books covering botany, horticulture, natural history, children's literature, research materials, and nursery catalogs.

A Three-Mile (5 km) Drive through the arboretum takes visitors past many of the collections.

== Research ==
=== Fruit Breeding ===
Varieties developed here are now household names in USA, such as the Honeycrisp and Haralson apples, or commonly licensed by growers, such as Itasca strawberries.

=== Horticultural Research Center ===
The Arboretum has developed commercially grown ornamental grasses such as the Blue Heaven Bluestem, and flowering crabapple and redbud tree varieties of many colors and sizes.

=== Plant Conservation Program ===
This program spearheads the protection and conservation of rare species in the region through research, seed banking, restoration and re-introduction. Staff-led volunteers and partners implement the work.

=== Woody Landscape Plant Breeding ===
The Arboretum develops plants suitable for use in USDA Plant Hardiness Zones 3 and 4 (winter temperature range to -40 degrees Celsius, including azaleas, dogwoods, maples and others. It has developed cold-hardy azalea and rhododendron cultivars since 1957. Among them are the "Lights" series, such as Candy Lights and Lilac Lights,

== See also ==
- List of botanical gardens in the United States
- List of members of the American Public Gardens Association
- Leon C. Snyder
