= Leon C. Snyder =

American professor and writer

Leon Carleton Snyder (March 11, 1908 – August 8, 1987) was an American professor, writer, and radio personality and co-founder of the Minnesota Landscape Arboretum. Through his work, research, broadcasts, and books he changed the way Minnesotans viewed the possibilities of gardening in a northern climate.

== Early life ==
In 1908 Leon C. Snyder was born in Shepherd, Michigan, U.S. He received both his B.S. and Ph.D. from the University of Washington. He taught botany for a while at South Dakota State College where he met a minister's daughter Vera Ferch, who would become his wife in 1934. In 1945 the couple moved to Minnesota. He began his career at the University of Minnesota as an extension horticulturalist, by 1953 he was promoted to head of the department.

== Minnesota Landscape Arboretum ==
In 1956 the Men's Garden Club of Minneapolis met with the Minnesota State Horticultural Society with the desire to create an arboretum. In 1958 after raising monies from local garden clubs a 160 acres (0.65 km^{2}) of land was purchased for the arboretum in the Twin Cities' suburbs; the arboretum was opened in the same year, and Snyder was its director from its opening until 1976. During his time as director Snyder helped expand every aspect of the arboretum, from its size, eventually to 630 acres (2.5 km^{2}) to its research capabilities and its facilities for visitors. The Leon C. Snyder Education and Resource Building, dedicated in 1974, contains both the Anderson Horticultural Library and the Meyer-Deats Conservatory.

== Other work ==
By the time Snyder stepped down as the head of the horticulture department in 1970 (to devote himself full-time to the arboretum) it had doubled in faculty. Snyder wrote a weekly column for the Minneapolis Star Tribune beginning in 1966. As well once a month he appeared on the Boone & Erickson Show on WCCO (AM) to answer garden-related questions. He led 18 gardener's tours and traveled the globe, often accompanied by his wife, including Australia and Europe. He raised four children: Ann, Leon Jr., Mary, and Erva. He had twelve grandchildren: James, Thomas, Jill, Marc, Steve, Michael, James Jr., Jeff, Michael, Andre', Karsten, and Jeremy. On his death in 1987, Jane McKinnon wrote this about Snyder:

"He taught both in scientific words and with dirt-stained hands. From his pencil on a notepad came scholarly publications; with sharp pruning shears he showed students how skills are perfected...He encouraged, challenged, forgave, and never reminded students of failures. He saw promise in the most unlikely freshmen, and freely complimented successful graduates. He always credited good work from colleagues and pupils as well. He forgot disagreements and had not time for grudge or malice. By his own industry he shamed sluggards. With his immaculate rows of vegetables and carefully tended rose beds, for anyone to enjoy on a moment's notice, he sent visitors home to try harder at gardening. By his example, he created visions of soft lawns, gracious trees, and bright flowers for those needing inspiration and encouragement."

== Awards and recognition ==
- Gold Medal awarded by The Men's Garden Clubs of America
- Medal of Honor from the Garden Club of America
- Norman Jay Colman Award
- Liberty Hyde Bailey Award from the American Horticultural Society
- Garden Writer's Association Honorary Member
- Sigma Xi
- Morchella snyderi, a species of morel, was named in his honor in 2012

== Works ==
- Gardening in the Upper Midwest (University of Minnesota Press, 1978)
- Trees and Shrubs for Northern Gardens (University of Minnesota Press, 1980)
- A Minnesota Gardener's Companion (co-authored, Minneapolis Tribune, 1981)
- How Does Your Garden Grow (WCCO Radio Publisher, 1982)
- Flowers for Northern Gardens (University of Minnesota Press, 1983)
- Native Plants for Northern Gardens (published posthumously Anderson Horticultural Library, 1991)
