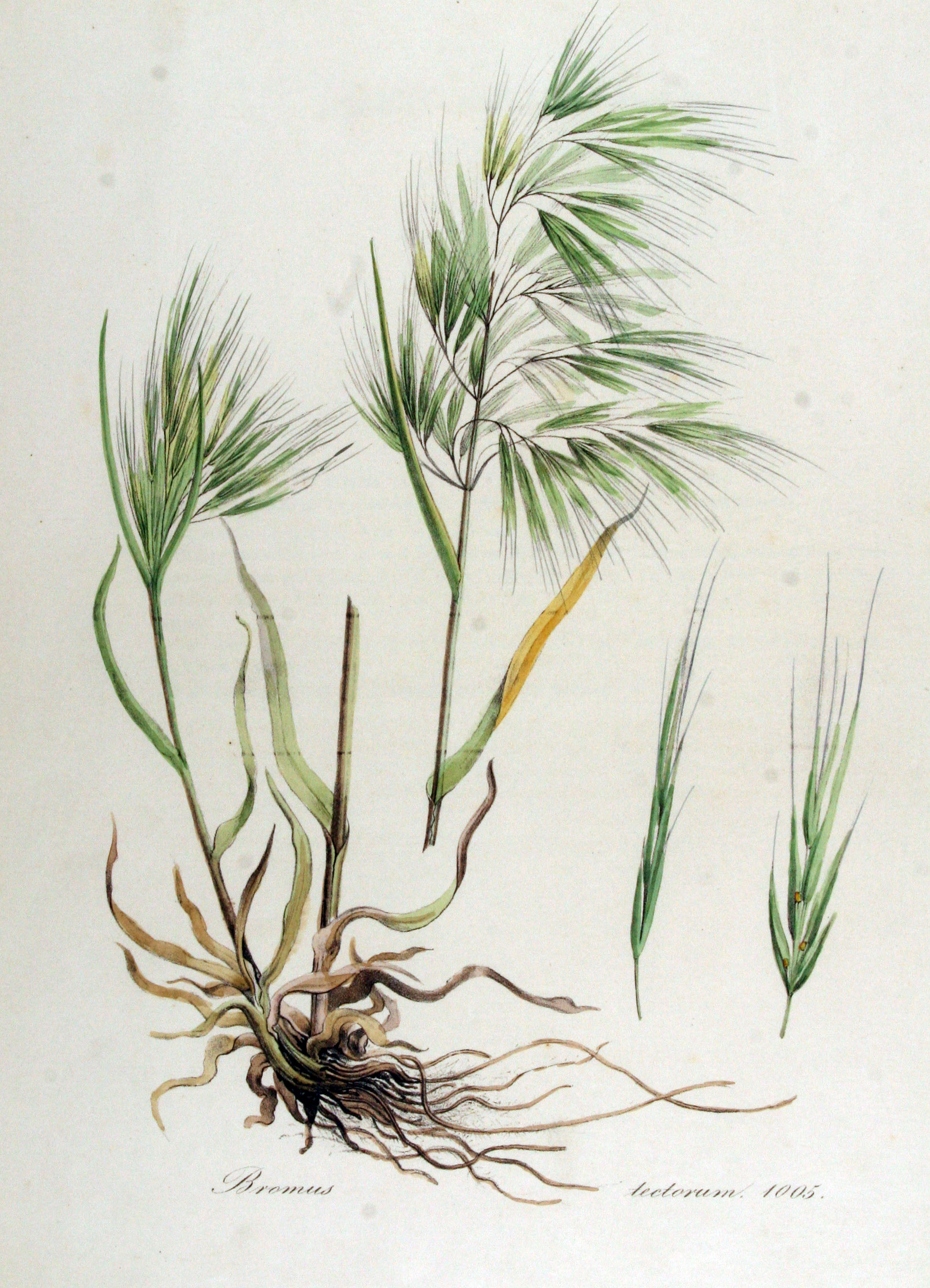

Scientific classification
- Kingdom: Plantae
- Clade: Tracheophytes
- Clade: Angiosperms
- Clade: Monocots
- Clade: Commelinids
- Order: Poales
- Family: Poaceae
- Subfamily: Pooideae
- Genus: Bromus
- Species: B. tectorum

Binomial name
- Bromus tectorum L.

Synonyms
- Anisantha tectorum (L.) Nevski

= Bromus tectorum =

Species of grass

Bromus tectorum, known as downy brome, drooping brome, or cheatgrass, is a winter annual grass native to Europe, southwestern Asia, and northern Africa, but has become invasive in many other areas. It now is present in most of Europe, southern Russia, Japan, South Africa, Australia, New Zealand, Iceland, Greenland, North America, and western Central Asia. In the eastern US, B. tectorum is common along roadsides and as a crop weed, but usually does not dominate an ecosystem. It has become a dominant species in the Intermountain West and parts of Canada, and displays especially invasive behavior in the sagebrush steppe ecosystems, where it has been listed as noxious weed. B. tectorum often enters the site in an area that has been disturbed, and then quickly expands into the surrounding area through its rapid growth and prolific seed production.

The reduction of native plants and the increased fire frequency caused by B. tectorum prompted the United States Fish and Wildlife Service (USFWS) to examine if the greater sage-grouse needed to be listed as a threatened or endangered species due to habitat destruction. After the review was completed by the USFWS, Secretarial Order 3336 was signed with the goal of reducing the threat of rangeland fires and preserve habitat by reducing downy brome.

Research has shown that ecosystems with a healthy biological soil crust and native plant community are resistant to B. tectorum invasion. In areas where B. tectorum is invasive, treatments that are being researched/used by land managers to control B. tectorum include seeding of native plants and non-native bunchgrasses to outcompete B. tectorum, herbicides, and prescribed burns. The effectiveness of these treatments is tightly linked to the timing of the water availability at the site. With precipitation shortly after herbicide and seeding treatments increasing the success, and overall high precipitation increases B. tectorum growth, causing the treatment effects to be statistically insignificant.

== Description ==
Bromus comes from a Greek word for a type of oat, and tectorum comes from the Latin possessive form of tector, which means "of the overlayment (roof)". Bromus tectorum is a winter annual grass native to Eurasia usually germinating in autumn, overwintering as a seedling, then flowering in the spring or early summer. B. tectorum may be mistaken for a bunchgrass because it may send up shoots that give it the appearance of having a rosette. In areas where it is growing in dense stands, the plant will not form this rosette-like structure, but instead is single-culmed (stalked).

The stems are smooth (glabrous) and slender. The leaves are hairy (pubescent) and have sheaths that are separate except at the node, where the leaf attaches to the stem. It typically reaches 40–90 cm (16–35 in) tall, though plants as small as 2.5 cm (0.98 in) may produce seed. The flowers of B. tectorum are arranged on a drooping panicle with about 30 spikelets with awns and five to eight flowers each. It is cleistogamous (self pollinating, non-opening flower) with no evident outcrossing. B. tectorum has a fibrous root system with few main roots that do not reach more than a foot into the soil, and has wide-spreading lateral roots that make it efficient at absorbing moisture from light precipitation episodes. It has the capability to reduce soil moisture to the permanent wilting point (minimal soil moisture required for a plant not to wilt) to a depth of 70 cm (28 in), reducing competition from other species.

== Life cycle and growing habits ==
=== Seeds ===
A downy brome seedling

The seeds ripen and disperse in the late spring and early summer. They are dispersed by wind, small rodents, or attachment to animal fur, within a week of maturity. They are also moved as a contaminant in hay, grain, straw, and machinery. B. tectorum is an abundant seed producer, with a potential in excess of 300 seeds per plant; seed production per plant is dependent on plant density. Under optimal conditions, B. tectorum may produce 450 kg of seed per hectare (400 pounds per acre) with about 330,000 seeds/kg (150,000 seeds/pound). As the seed of B. tectorum ripen, the plant turns from green to purple to straw-colored.

B. tectorum seeds demonstrate rapid germination as soon as the seed lands in appropriate conditions. If winter rainfall is limiting and germination is inhibited, but spring moisture is adequate, then seeds will germinate in the spring, and the plants will flower that summer. The seeds maintain high viability (ability to germinate under optimal conditions) in dry storage, lasting over 11 years. In the field, under buried conditions, seeds lose their viability in 2–5 years. Seeds can withstand high soil temperatures, and the primary limit to germination is inadequate moisture. Germination is best in the dark or diffuse light. They germinate most quickly when covered with soil, but do not need to be in contact with bare soil. Some leaf litter cover generally improves germination and establishment of seedlings. Seedlings emerge rapidly from the top 2.5 cm (1 in) of soil, and a few plants emerge from depths of 8 cm (3 in), but not from seeds 10 cm (4 in) below the surface.

== Taxonomy ==
The scientific name Bromus tectorum was given to the species by Carl Linnaeus in Species Plantarum, which was published in 1753. According to Plants of the World Online, it has 57 synonyms, including four that were reclassifications into another genus. It has no accepted varieties.

== Distribution & Habitat ==
Distribution of downy brome around the World

B. tectorum grows in many different climates. It is found primarily in the 150–560 mm (5.9–22.0 in) precipitation zone. It can grow in almost any type of soil, including B and C horizons of eroded areas and areas low in nitrogen. B. tectorum is quick to colonize disturbed areas. It is most often found on coarse-textured soils and does not grow well on heavy, dry, and/or saline soils. It grows in a relatively narrow range of soil temperatures; growth starts at 2.0–3.5 °C (35.6–38.3 °F) and slows when temperatures exceed 15 °C (59 °F).

B. tectorum's native range extends into central Asia, southwestern Asia, and the Mediterranean; it is particularly common in Palestine, the Sinai Peninsula, Jordan, Syria, the Arabian Peninsula, and IranB. tectorum has been introduced to southern Russia, west central Asia, North America, Japan, South Africa, Australia, New Zealand, Iceland, and Greenland. It was first found in the United States (where it is known as downy brome or cheatgrass) in 1861 in New York and Pennsylvania, and by 1928, B. tectorum had spread to all parts of the United States (including Hawaii and Alaska), except for Florida and portions of Alabama, Georgia, and South Carolina. B. tectorum is most abundant in the Great Basin and Columbia Basin, and is part of the introduced species that replaced California native plants in the California Floristic Province's grasslands and other habitats. In Canada, B. tectorum has been identified as an invasive weed in all provinces, and is extremely prevalent in Alberta and British Columbia .

== Status as an Exotic Weed ==
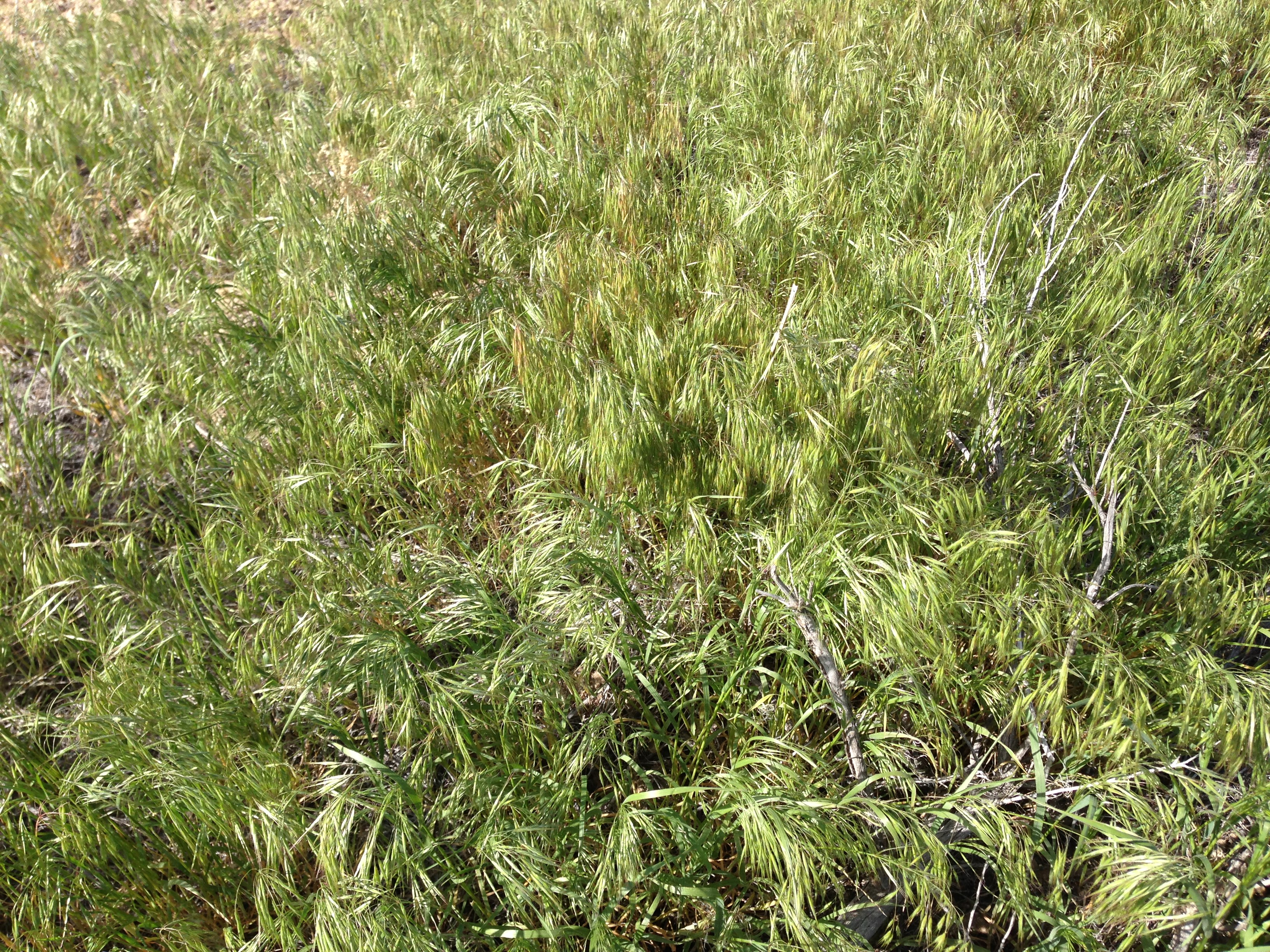
Cheatgrass in Elko, Nevada

=== Invasive species ===
In the US, it grows on rangelands, pastures, prairies, fields, waste areas, eroded sites, and roadsides. It is much reviled by ranchers and land managers. B. tectorum seeds are also a critical portion of the diet of the chukar and grey partridge, which have been introduced to the US. Intensive sheep browsing of B. tectorum in early spring has been used as a fire fuels-reduction strategy in the hills adjacent to Carson City, Nevada. Because of rangeland fires and the invasion of B. tectorum, in 2010. the United States Fish and Wildlife Service (USFWS) considered the possibility of extending the protections of the Endangered Species Act to the greater sage-grouse. The primary focus of Secretarial Order 3336, signed in 2015 in response to the USFWS status review, was to reduce threats to greater sage-grouse habitat by reducing the frequency and severity of rangeland fire. Specifically, Secretarial Order 3336 focused on how reducing B. tectorum could reduce the frequency and extent of rangeland fires. Since the review of the status of the greater sage-grouse by the USFWS in 2010 and the implementation Secretarial Order 3336, the bulk of the research focusing on B. tectorum ecology and control has been completed.

Bromus tectorum has demonstrated a quantitative and qualitative response to recent and near-term changes in the concentration of atmospheric carbon dioxide. Laboratory experiments have shown that above-ground biomass increased 1.5–2.7 gram per plant for every 10 part per million (ppm) increase above the 270 ppm preindustrial baseline. On the qualitative side, rising carbon dioxide decreased the digestibility and potential decomposition of B. tectorum. In addition to stimulation of biomass, rising carbon dioxide may also increase the above-ground retention of B. tectorum biomass by decreasing removal by animals or bacteria. Ongoing increases in atmospheric carbon dioxide may contribute significantly to B. tectorum productivity and fuel load, with subsequent effects on wildfire frequency and intensity.

B. tectorum has been shown to benefit from endophytic colonization by morels (Morchella sextelata, M. snyderi) in western North America.

=== Treatment options ===
==== Seeding ====
The availability of native seed always is a limiting factor in restoration of sagebrush ecosystems after a rangeland fire. Little is understood about the germination requirements of native species. This lack of understanding is complicated by the episodic nature of establishment in arid grasslands. In response to the limited availability of native seed, land managers have been seeding Agropyron cristatum, a perennial bunchgrass native to Russia and Asia. The use of seeding another non-native to control an exotic, problem species is called assisted succession. A. cristatum is much easier to establish than the native perennials and has been shown to be a strong competitor of B. tectorum.

However, A. cristatum can exhibit invasive behavior and is a strong competitor of native perennials. The reason it is used, regardless of its invasive behavior, is because it restores some function to a perennial grassland. A. cristatum is resistant to wildfire and it is suitable forage for cattle and wildlife, but the intensive control that would be needed to establish a native plant community in an A. cristatum monoculture would cause disturbances that would also increase the invasive species it was planted to outcompete. An alternative to using A. cristatum as a placeholder species in assisted succession is to establish it alongside foundation species such as sagebrush. Adding sagebrush would diversify the ecosystem and provide habitat for sagebrush obligates, but this would mean accepting the possibility that the native plant community may never establish.

==== Herbicides ====
A majority of research in 2011-2017 has focused on the use of herbicides to control B. tectorum and their effect on native plant communities. When using herbicides to suppress winter annual grasses, the two most important factors that influence success are application timing and residual soil activity. Application timing is split into three main categories - pre-emergence in the fall before B. tectorum germinates, early postemergence in early spring when B. tectorum is a seedling, and late postemergence in late spring after B. tectorum is mature.

To be most effective, postemergence application needs to be done as late in the spring as possible to ensure that the herbicide treatment hits the majority of the B. tectorum population. However, the late application puts the native perennial vegetation at risk, as they may be coming out of dormancy. Herbicides with no residual soil activity are not generally used because they are only effective in the year of application. If the herbicide has no residual soil activity, the herbicide must be applied postemergence in the early spring, but pre-emergence application is preferred because it is less likely to harm the native vegetation.

Studies have suggested that herbicide usage may select for warm-season grasses and decrease the abundance of cool-season grasses. Five main herbicides are used to control B. tectorum - imazapic, rimsulfuron, tebuthiuron, glyphosate, and indaziflam. The bulk of the recent research, though, has been done on glyphosate, indaziflam, and imazapic.

Glyphosate has no residual soil activity and must be used postemergence, which limits its control of B. tectorum to one year. For effective control, it must be applied to the same area for more than five years to get ahead of seed production to prevent recolonization. Imazapic is the herbicide most widely used by land managers for B. tectorum control. Of the herbicides listed, it is also the most commonly studied. Imazapic is preferred because it can be applied both pre- and postemergence, is approved for rangeland use, and has residual soil activity that allows for one- to two-year control. Indaziflam is one of the newest herbicides, licensed in 2010. It has a residual soil activity of 2–3 years. and it is also useful against many other invasive grasses. Not only does it reduce the abundance and biomass of B. tectorum, but it also reduces the highly flammable litter that B. tectorum produces. In early trials, it has consistently outcompeted imazapic. As of 2017, indaziflam has not been approved for use outside of residential and commercial properties.

==== Prescribed burning ====
Prescribed burning alone reduces B. tectorum biomass for about two years. The goal of a prescribed burn in a B. tectorum-invaded area is to remove the highly flammable plant litter in a controlled manner. The timing of prescribed burns can affect the variety and amount of returning vegetation. Spring burns may result in a significant reduction of native vegetation, but fall burns have been shown to increase species richness. Fall burns may also promote select grasses and fire-resilient plants. Another control for B. tectorum burns is consideration for the densities and fire adaptations of nearby foliage. In some cases, the existence of adjacent morchella can trigger mutual relationships such as increased fiber, and by extension, fuels that nurture the return of cheatgrass. Similarly, when densely packed conifers begin infilling sagebrush communities, the understory perennial vegetation is reduced; when these areas are burned, the succession is dominated by B. tectorum in favor of taller grasses, making burns situationally inferior.

==== Water availability and treatment success ====
Water availably has a large impact on the success of B. tectorum treatments. In years of high precipitation, B. tectorum recruitment and biomass will increase and may render the treatment ineffective. In most long-term B. tectorum studies. precipitation differences between years are speculated to be the cause of variation in effectiveness. However, well-timed precipitation after herbicide application can increase the amount of herbicide absorbed into the soil. When herbicide is applied to an area and B. tectorum litter is on the ground, much of the herbicide is absorbed into the litter and some adheres to the litter. The litter creates a blanket that B. tectorum can germinate under even after herbicide application.If rain occurs shortly after herbicide application, then some of the herbicide trapped in the litter can be released and work into the soil. The rain may also allow native species to overcome herbicide impacts. Increased precipitation in early spring may increase the success of seeding by increasing the germination rate of native grasses and remove B. tectorum's competitive advantage.

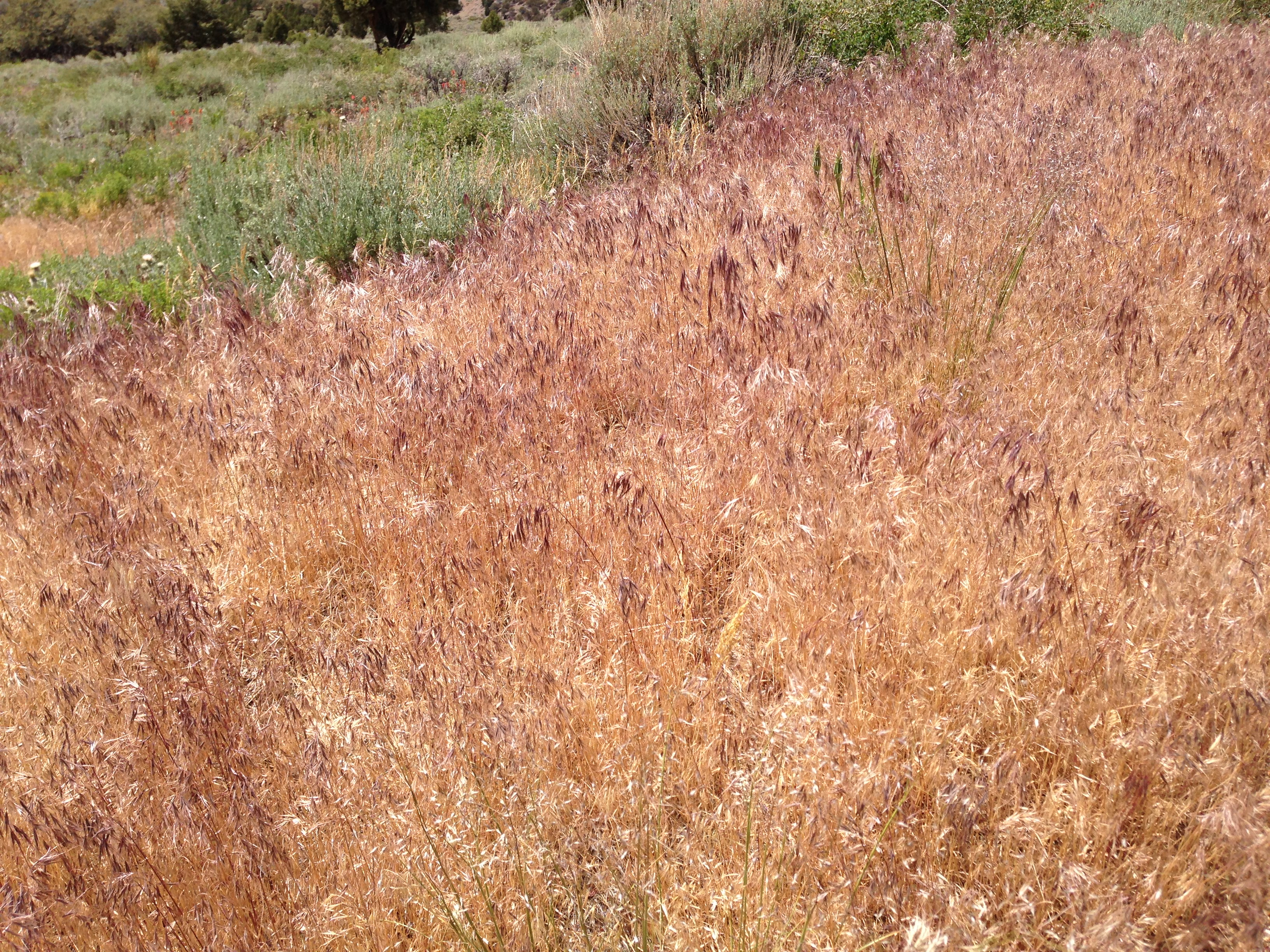
Invasive B. tectorum on Spruce Mountain, Nevada

=== Characteristics of a resistant native community ===
A positive correlation is seen between native vegetation communities and biological soil crust (BSC). BSC is composed of cyanobacteria, algae, lichens, and mosses living on the soil. In arid regions, BSCs colonize the spaces between plants, increase the biodiversity of the area, are often the dominant cover, and are vital in ecosystem function. In addition to providing erosion control, BSC is vital for nutrient cycling and carbon fixation. Fire and trampling by cattle are the major threats to the BSC communities, and once disturbed, decades or even centuries may be needed for BSC to reform. A decline in the health of the BSC community serves as an early-warning indicator for B.s tectorum invasion. If the BSC community is healthy, then it will impede B. tectorum germination and reduce the likelihood of invasion. If a disturbance in the biological soil crust occurs, though, and B. tectorum is able to establish, then it will impede the recovery of the BSC community.

Native perennial grasses have roots that often reach four feet into the soil. These roots provide organic matter, which feeds the soil organisms that assist in water and nutrient cycling in arid ecosystems and improve soil quality. Bromus tectorum has a shallow, spreading root system, which makes it much more efficient at absorbing moisture from light precipitation episodes and disrupts nutrient cycling. Several studies have shown that native plant biomass, especially that of bunchgrasses, negatively affects B. tectorum cover and biomass, suggesting that a diverse native perennial community is more resistant to B. tectorum invasion.

Studies have identified Poa secunda, Pseudoroegneria spicata, and Achnatherum thurberianum as key grasses for B. tectorum resistance. The life strategies of these three grasses differ in such a way that they provide constant interaction and competition with B. tectorum. P. spicata and A. thurberianum are deep rooted and complete most of their growth in the late spring, and P. secunda is shallow rooted and completes most of its growth in the late winter and early spring.

Perennial grass ecosystems are less prone to burning. B. tectorum has been historically thought to create a positive feedback loop. However, Taylor, et al. (2014) suggest that fire alone does not promote B. tectorum. If an area burns, the B. tectorum cover and biomass do not increase as was once thought, but recover to previous levels. Increased fires, because of B. tectorum, may serve to maintain, not increase, the B. tectorum population by preventing the natives from establishing.
