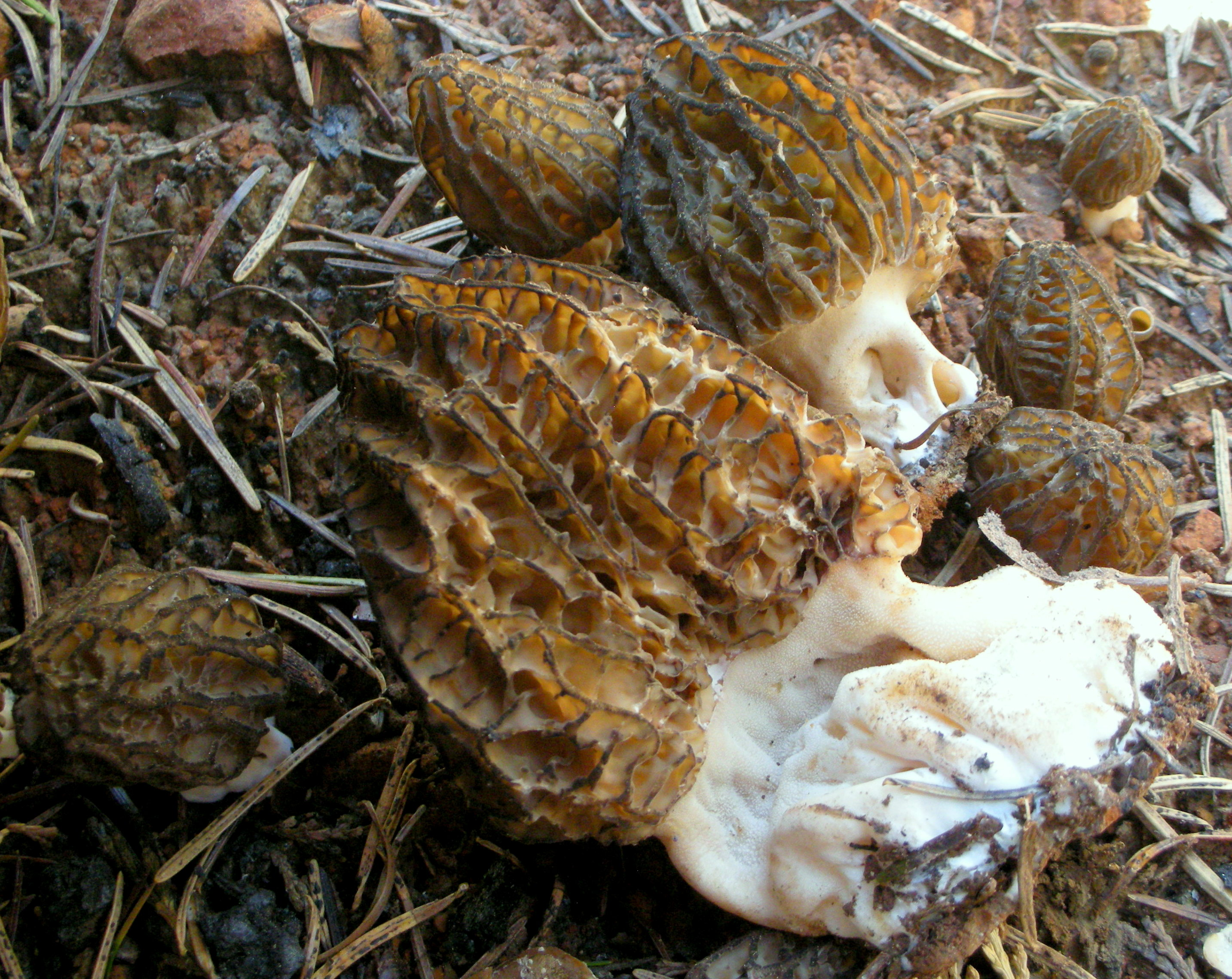

Scientific classification
- Kingdom: Fungi
- Division: Ascomycota
- Class: Pezizomycetes
- Order: Pezizales
- Family: Morchellaceae
- Genus: Morchella
- Species: M. septimelata

Binomial name
- Morchella septimelata M.Kuo (2012)

= Morchella septimelata =

Species of fungus

Morchella septimelata is a species of fungus in the family Morchellaceae described as new to science in 2012. Occurring in western North America, it has been collected from British Columbia, Montana and Oregon, where it fruits at elevations of 1,000 to 2,000 m (3,300 to 6,600 ft) in coniferous forests in years following slight to moderate burning.

Morchella septimelata is one of four species of wildfire-adapted morel in western North America, the others being M. capitata, M. sextelata, and M. tomentosa. M. septimelata cannot be reliably distinguished from M. sextelata without the use of DNA analysis. M. septimelata, identified as phylogenetic species "Mel-7", has also been found in Europe, Turkey, China, and Australia but it remains unclear whether dispersal between these distant locations occurred naturally or through accidental introduction by humans.

In 2014, Richard et al. clarified the taxonomic status of this species, retaining the name Morchella eximia Boudier (1909) over M. septimelata.
