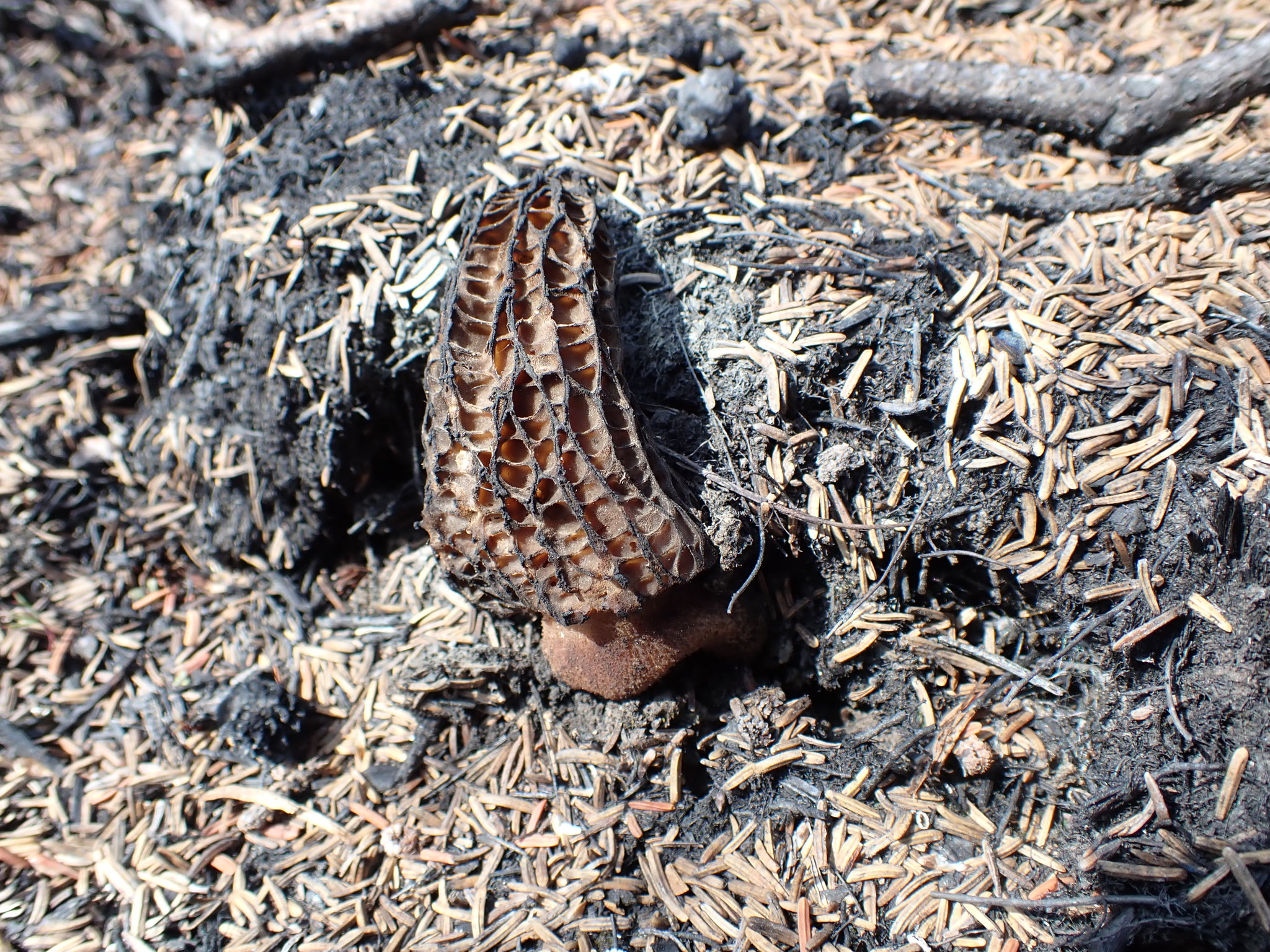

Scientific classification
- Kingdom: Fungi
- Division: Ascomycota
- Class: Pezizomycetes
- Order: Pezizales
- Family: Morchellaceae
- Genus: Morchella
- Species: M. exuberans

Binomial name
- Morchella exuberans Clowez, Hugh Sm. & S. Sm. (2012)

Synonyms
- Morchella capitata M. Kuo & M.C. Carter (2012)

= Morchella exuberans =

Species of fungus

Morchella exuberans is a species of fungus in the family Morchellaceae (Ascomycota). It was described as new to science in a 2012 study by Philippe Clowez and corresponds to phylogenetic lineage Mel-9. Morchella capitata, described by Kuo and colleagues later in the same year, is a synonym of this taxon.

Morchella exuberans is a fire-associated morel, growing the first or second spring following a forest fire. It has so far been reported from North America, Turkey, Sweden, China and Cyprus. Among some of the striking features of this species, are the capitate acroparaphyses on the sterile ridges of its cap, and the chambered stem.
