= Morchella capitata =

Scientific classification
- Kingdom: Fungi
- Division: Ascomycota
- Class: Pezizomycetes
- Order: Pezizales
- Family: Morchellaceae
- Genus: Morchella
- Species: M. capitata

Binomial name
- Morchella capitata M.Kuo & M.C.Carter (2012)

Species of fungus

Morchella capitata is a later synonym of Morchella exuberans. Originally identified as phylogenetic species Mel-9, it was described as new to science in 2012 by Kuo and colleagues. In 2014 however, Richard and colleagues clarified the taxonomic status of this species, retaining the name Morchella exuberans of Clowez (2012) over M. capitata.

It is a cosmopolitan, post-fire fungus in the family Morchellaceae, shown to occur in at least three continents, and is one of four species of fire-adapted morels in western North America (the others being M. eximia, M. sextelata, and M. tomentosa). It has also been found in Turkey, Sweden, China and Cyprus, but remains unclear whether dispersal between these distant locations occurred naturally or through accidental introduction by humans.
