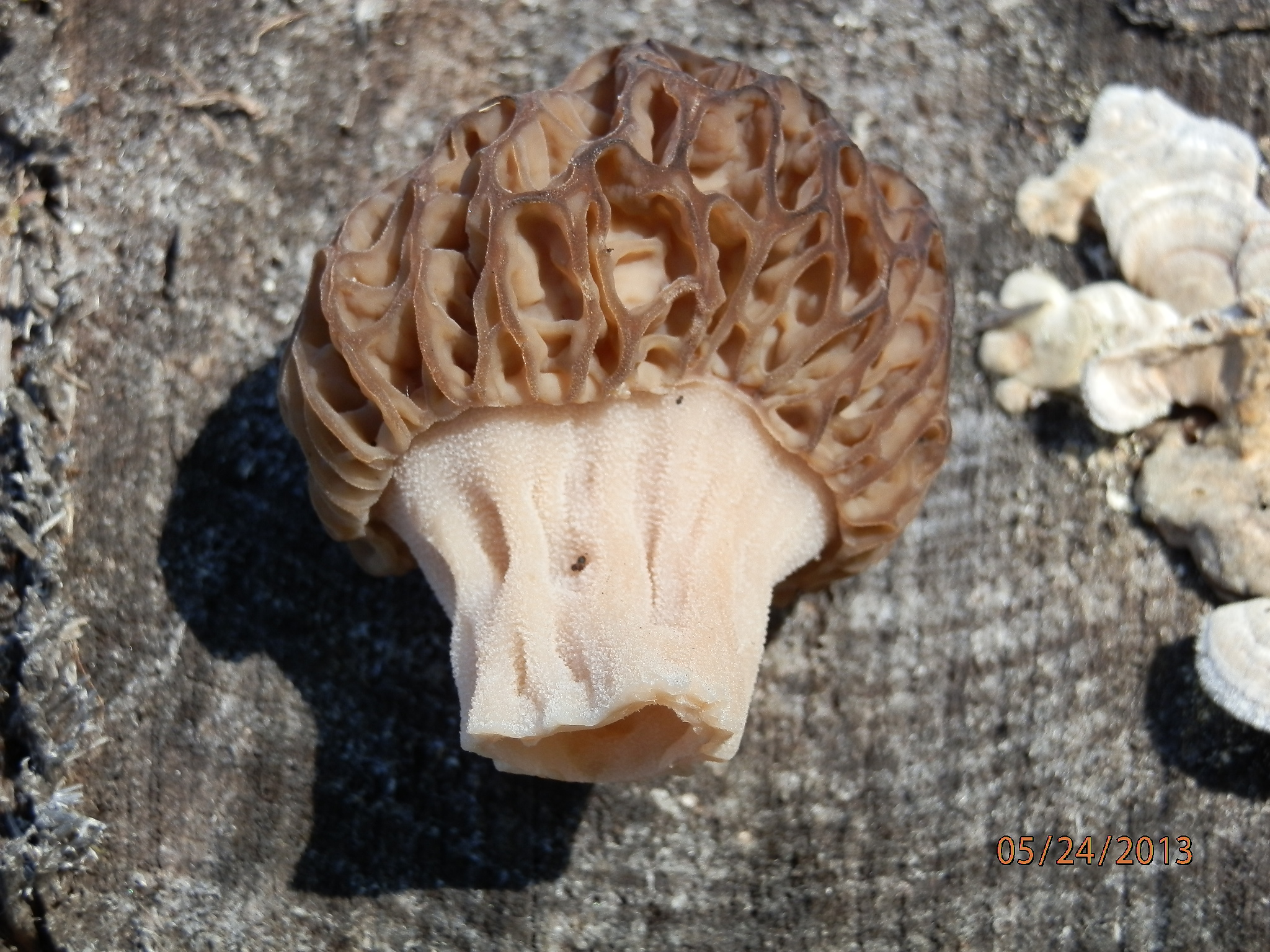

Scientific classification
- Domain: Eukaryota
- Kingdom: Fungi
- Division: Ascomycota
- Class: Pezizomycetes
- Order: Pezizales
- Family: Morchellaceae
- Genus: Morchella
- Species: M. septentrionalis

Binomial name
- Morchella septentrionalis M.Kuo, J.D.Moore & Zordani (2012)

= Morchella septentrionalis =

Species of fungus

Morchella septentrionalis species of fungus in the family Morchellaceae native North America. Described as new to science in 2012, it has a northerly eastern North American distribution, where it occurs north of 44°N. The fungus fruits under hardwoods, particularly American aspen (Populus grandidentata) and American ash (Fraxinus americana).
