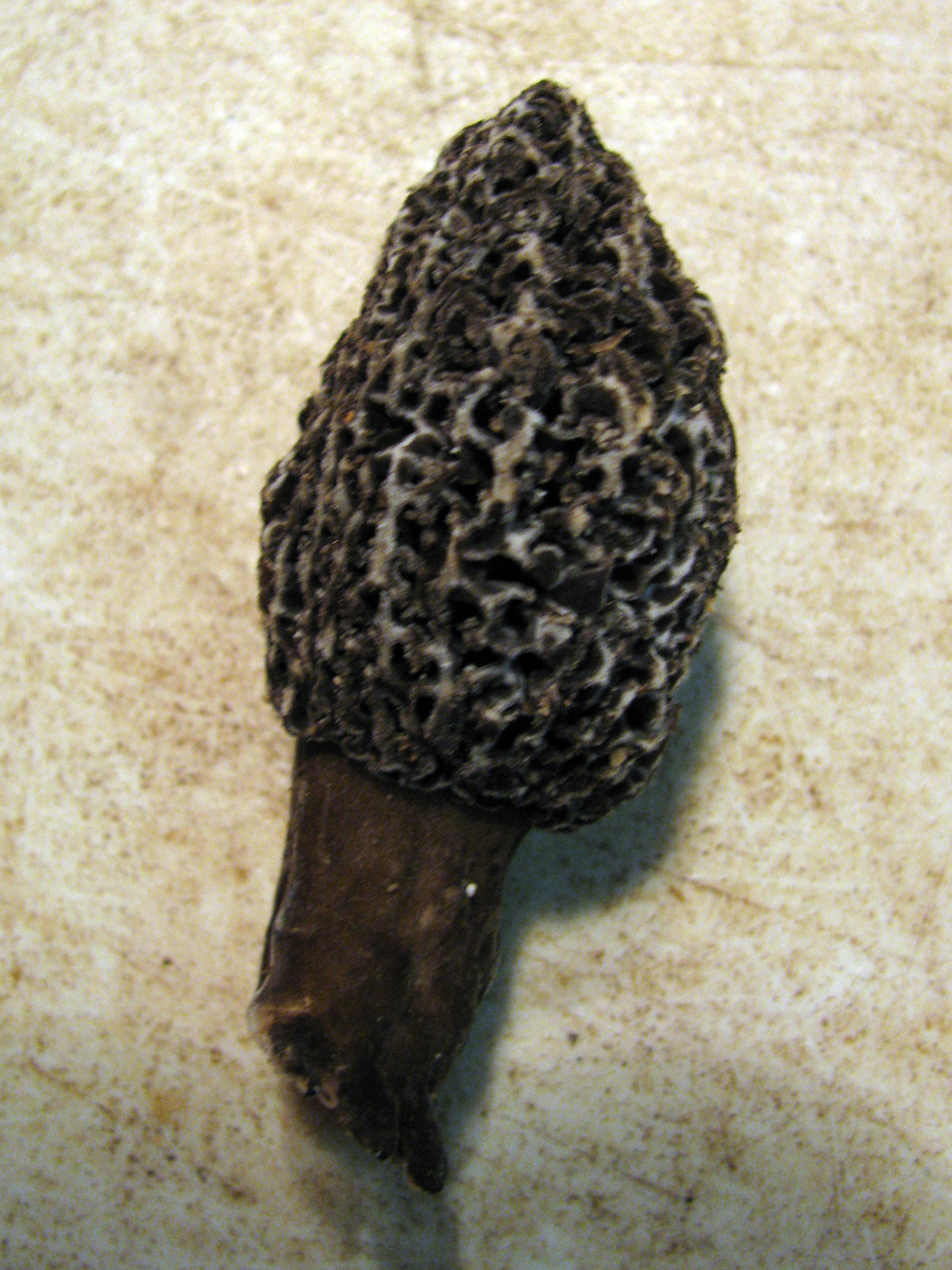

Scientific classification
- Domain: Eukaryota
- Kingdom: Fungi
- Division: Ascomycota
- Class: Pezizomycetes
- Order: Pezizales
- Family: Morchellaceae
- Genus: Morchella
- Species: M. tomentosa

Binomial name
- Morchella tomentosa M.Kuo (2008)

Synonyms
- Morchella atrotomentosa McKnight (1987)

= Morchella tomentosa =

Species of fungus

Morchella tomentosa Mycological characteristics
- Smooth hymenium
- Cap is conical or ovate
- Hymenium attachment is irregular or not applicable
- Stipe is bare
- Spore print is cream to yellow
- Ecology is mycorrhizal or saprotrophic
- Edibility is choice

Morchella tomentosa, commonly called the gray, fuzzy foot, or black foot morel, is a species of fungus in the family Morchellaceae. M. tomentosa is a fire-associated species described from western North America, formally described as new to science in 2008.

Morchella tomentosa is identified by its post-fire occurrence, fine hairs on the surface of young fruit bodies, and a thick, "double-walled" stem. It also has unique sclerotia-like underground parts. Color can range from black and "sooty" to gray, brown, yellow, or white, although color tends to progress from darker to lighter with age of the fruiting body. Three other wildfire-adapted morels were described from western North America in 2012: M. capitata, M. septimelata, and M. sextelata. None of these three new species share the hairy surface texture of M. tomentosa.

== Phylogeny ==
Based on studies of DNA, M. tomentosa is clearly a distinct species apart from the yellow morels (M. esculenta & ssp.) and black morels (M. elata & ssp.). Mushroom collectors also use the common name "gray morel" for M. esculenta-type morels in eastern North America.
