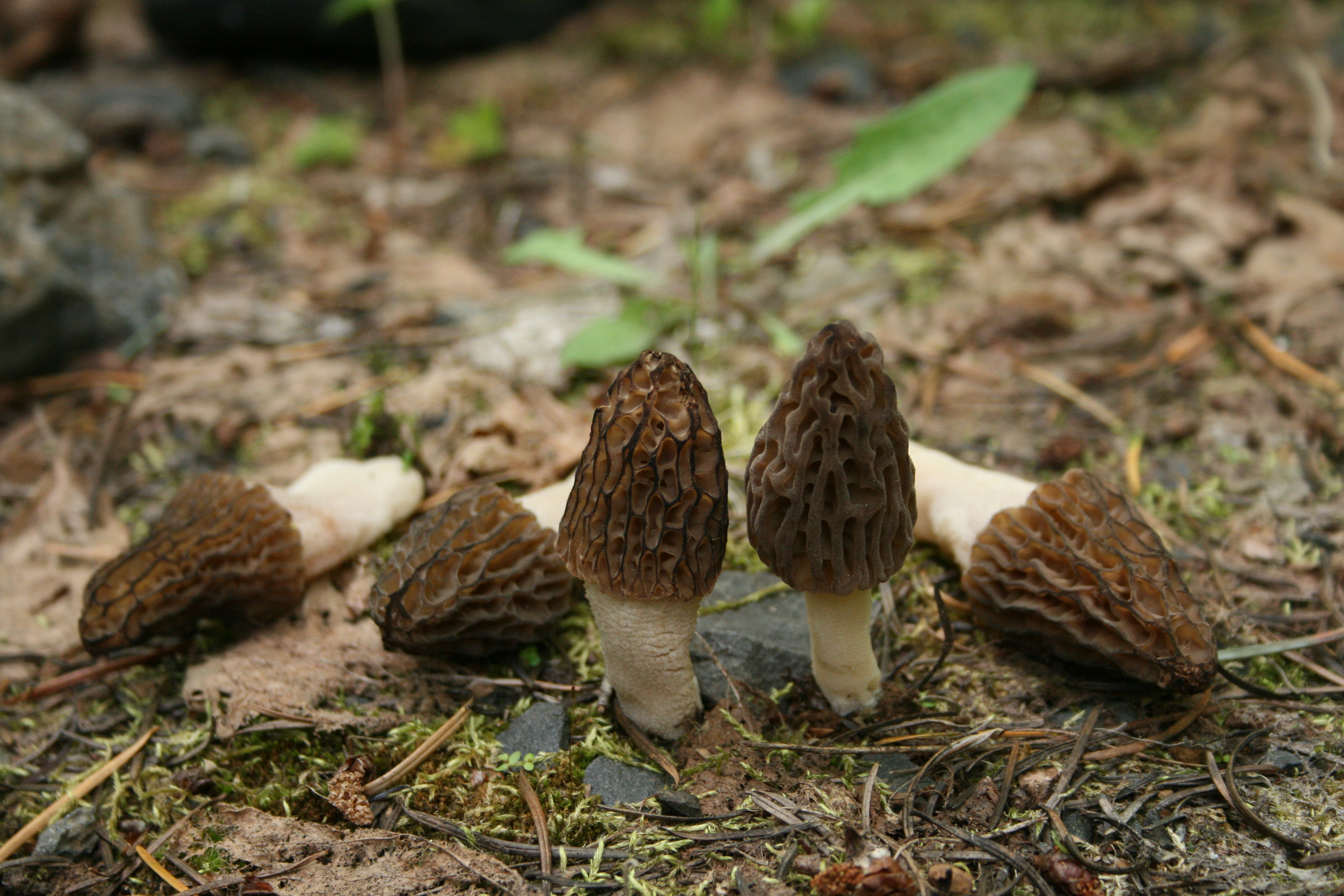

Scientific classification
- Domain: Eukaryota
- Kingdom: Fungi
- Division: Ascomycota
- Class: Pezizomycetes
- Order: Pezizales
- Family: Morchellaceae
- Genus: Morchella
- Species: M. brunnea

Binomial name
- Morchella brunnea M.Kuo (2012)

= Morchella brunnea =

Species of fungus

Morchella brunnea is a species of fungus in the family Morchellaceae. Described as new to science in 2012, it is known from Oregon, where it fruits under hardwood trees.
