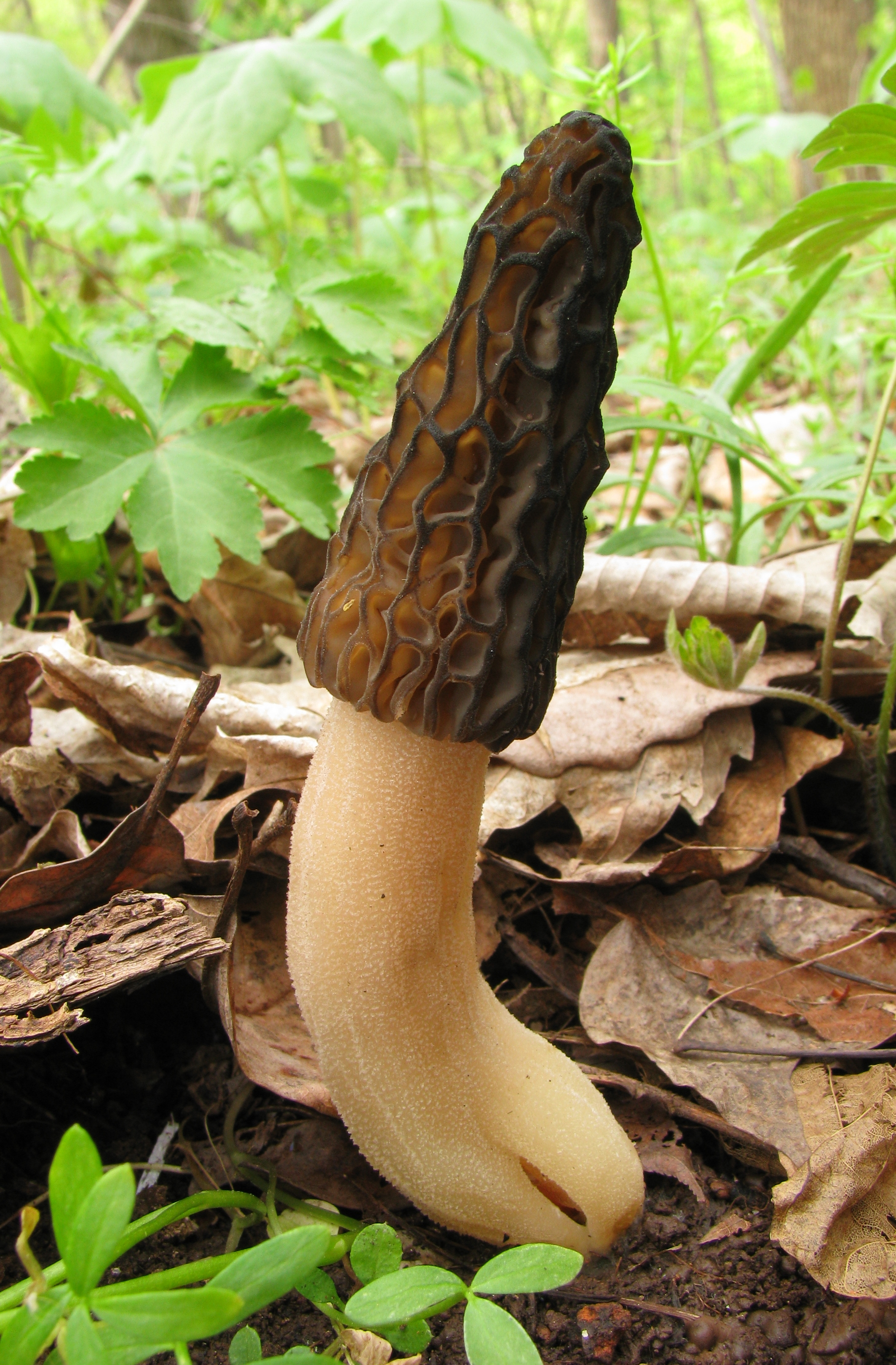
- a black morel in Ohio, USA

Scientific classification
- Domain: Eukaryota
- Kingdom: Fungi
- Division: Ascomycota
- Class: Pezizomycetes
- Order: Pezizales
- Family: Morchellaceae
- Genus: Morchella
- Species: M. angusticeps

Binomial name
- Morchella angusticeps Peck (1879)

= Morchella angusticeps =

Species of fungus

Morchella angusticeps is a species of fungus in the family Morchellaceae native to eastern North America. Described by Charles Horton Peck in 1879, the name M. angusticeps was clarified in 2012 prior to which this species may have been referred to as either M. angusticeps or M. elata. M. angusticeps is one of the black morels, and is found in eastern North America, where it occurs in association with various hardwoods in the spring.

A similar, although smaller, black morel occurs in northeastern North America, M. septentrionalis.
