= National Register of Historic Places listings in Houston County, Minnesota =

Location of Houston County in Minnesota

This is a list of the National Register of Historic Places listings in Houston County, Minnesota. It is intended to be a complete list of the properties and districts on the National Register of Historic Places in Houston County, Minnesota, United States. The locations of National Register properties and districts for which the latitude and longitude coordinates are included below, may be seen in an online map.

There are 16 properties and districts listed on the National Register in the county. A supplementary list includes two sites that were formerly listed on the National Register.

This National Park Service list is complete through NPS recent listings posted September 12, 2025.

== Current listings ==
	Name on the Register	Image	Date listed	Location	City or town	Description
1	Ballard Hotel	Ballard Hotel	November 27, 2017 (#100001841)	163 West Main Street; 43°33′38″N 91°38′18″W	Spring Grove	1893 commercial hotel, a once-common amenity catering to traveling salesmen and itinerant professionals. Now Giants of the Earth Heritage Center.
2	Bridge No. 6679	Bridge No. 6679	July 20, 2011 (#11000468)	Minnesota State Highway 76 over the south fork of the Root River; 43°44′19″N 91°33′52″W	Houston vicinity	1949 steel cantilever bridge—at 300 feet (91 m) the longest in Minnesota upon completion—exemplifying a major post-war advancement in bridge design.
3	Bridge No. L4013	Bridge No. L4013	July 5, 1990 (#90000976)	Township Road 126 over Riceford Creek; 43°37′21″N 91°42′21″W	Spring Grove vicinity	1915 stone arch bridge, the only documented surviving example of what appears to be a standard design introduced by the state highway commission in the early 20th century. Removed in 2016.
4	Christian Bunge, Jr. Store	Christian Bunge, Jr. Store	April 6, 1982 (#82002964)	Iowa Avenue at Main Street; 43°30′28″N 91°27′50″W	Eitzen	Eitzen's most prominent commercial building—built in 1890 for the German immigrant merchant who named the town—and a symbol of the area's ethnic heritage. Now a local history museum.
5	Caledonia Commercial Historic District	Caledonia Commercial Historic District	August 5, 1994 (#94000830)	101–205 E. Main St. and 101–108 S. Kingston St. 43°38′05″N 91°29′47″W	Caledonia	Downtown strip with 10 contributing properties built 1872–1906, significant for its late-19th/early-20th-century commercial architecture and its key role in serving Houston County farmers.
6	Daniel Cameron House	Daniel Cameron House	April 6, 1982 (#82002968)	429–435 South 7th Street; 43°49′19″N 91°18′28″W	La Crescent	Prominent 1871 house noted for its Italianate architecture and associations with Daniel Cameron (a prosperous farmer and state senator) and his brother Peter (the first settler in the area).
7	Church of the Holy Comforter-Episcopal	Church of the Holy Comforter-Episcopal	June 2, 1970 (#70000298)	Main Street; 43°41′39″N 91°16′37″W	Brownsville	Brownsville's oldest public building, built in 1855 and used as a town hall, church, and school.
8	Hokah Municipal Building	Hokah Municipal Building	October 20, 2014 (#14000868)	57 Main St. 43°45′34″N 91°20′46″W	Hokah	1938 Art Deco hall with government and recreational facilities, a distinctive example of a small-town partnership with the Works Progress Administration for a multipurpose public building.
9	Houston County Courthouse and Jail	Houston County Courthouse and Jail	March 18, 1983 (#83000905)	Courthouse Square; 43°37′58″N 91°29′45″W	Caledonia	1875 sheriff's residence/jail and 1883 courthouse, noted for their association with Houston County's government and for being its leading examples of Italianate and Romanesque Revival architecture, respectively.
10	Jefferson Grain Warehouse	Jefferson Grain Warehouse	November 25, 1994 (#94001386)	Off Minnesota Highway 26; 43°31′00″N 91°16′46″W	Jefferson Township	Riverside grain warehouse built in 1868, a rare surviving reminder of a period when wheat was becoming the most important agricultural crop of the Upper Midwest and steamboats were still the leading form of transportation.
11	Johnson Mill	Johnson Mill	April 6, 1982 (#82002966)	County Roads 5 and 23; 43°32′19″N 91°24′45″W	Eitzen vicinity	One of Minnesota's few surviving water-powered gristmills, built in 1877 to serve the area's wheat farmers.
12	Portland Prairie Methodist Episcopal Church	Portland Prairie Methodist Episcopal Church	April 6, 1982 (#82002967)	Off Minnesota Highway 76; 43°31′33″N 91°29′28″W	Eitzen vicinity	Rural church built in 1876, noted for its exemplary Eastlake movement architecture and association with the area's settlers from New England.
13	Schech Mill	Schech Mill	January 31, 1978 (#78001548)	Off County Road 10; 43°40′02″N 91°34′50″W	Caledonia vicinity	Rare surviving watermill built 1875–76, and Minnesota's only gristmill to retain its original millstones and operable 1870s-style machinery. Now a museum.
14	David R. and Ellsworth A. Sprague Houses	David R. and Ellsworth A. Sprague Houses	April 6, 1982 (#82002962)	204 and 224 West Main Street; 43°38′05″N 91°29′55″W	Caledonia	Two adjacent houses built between 1900 and 1905 for brothers David R. and Ellsworth A. Sprague, who carried on the commercial and financial work of their father, influential Houston County figure Ara D. Sprague (d. 1909).
15	Spafford Williams Hotel	Spafford Williams Hotel	April 6, 1982 (#82002963)	137 East Main Street; 43°38′05″N 91°29′46″W	Caledonia	Hotel established in the early 1870s before the railroad reached Caledonia, representing the city's early commercial activity and architecture. Also a contributing property to the Caledonia Commercial Historic District.
16	Yucatan Fort Site	Yucatan Fort Site	November 14, 1996 (#96001308)	Address restricted	Yucatan Township	Blufftop earthworks, a largely intact site that helps illustrate the emergence of agriculture and densifying population along Upper Mississippi tributary valleys during the Oneota period.

== Former listings ==
	Name on the Register	Image	Date listed	Date removed	Location	City or town	Description
1	Eitzen Stone Barn		April 6, 1982 (#82002965)	November 7, 2016	South of Eitzen	Eitzen vicinity	Barn built of fieldstone sometime in the 1870s or '80s, an unusual vernacular use of stonemasonry and a representative of the area's German immigrants and agricultural focus. Also called the Schroeder Stone Barn. Razed in 2004.
2	Houston County Poor Farm		April 6, 1982 (#82002961)	May 7, 1990	Co. Hwy. 12	Caledonia vicinity	1893 poor farm. Demolished in 1988.

== See also ==
- List of National Historic Landmarks in Minnesota
- National Register of Historic Places listings in Minnesota
