= Bee, Minnesota =

Unincorporated community in Minnesota, United States

Bee
- Unincorporated community
- Location within Minnesota Location within the United States
- Coordinates: 43°30′04″N 91°34′15″W
- Country: United States
- State: Minnesota
- County: Houston County
- Township: Wilmington Township
- Elevation: 906 ft (276 m)
- Time zone: UTC-6 (Central (CST))
  - Summer (DST): UTC-5 (CDT)
- ZIP code: 55974
- Area code: 507
- GNIS feature ID: 654594

Bee is an unincorporated community in Wilmington Township, Houston County, Minnesota, United States.

The community is located at the junction of Bee Hill Drive and Oakland Drive.

Bee Creek–Waterloo Creek flows through the community. Nearby places in Minnesota include Spring Grove, Wilmington, Caledonia, and Eitzen. Nearby places in Iowa include Dorchester and Waterloo Creek Wildlife Management Area.

First named Bergen, Bee had a post office from 1891 to 1905. At one time, Bee had a flour mill, a store, a creamery, and a station on the former Chicago, Milwaukee and St. Paul Railroad.
