= Johnson Mill =

Historic flour mill site in Minnesota, US

- U.S. National Register of Historic Places
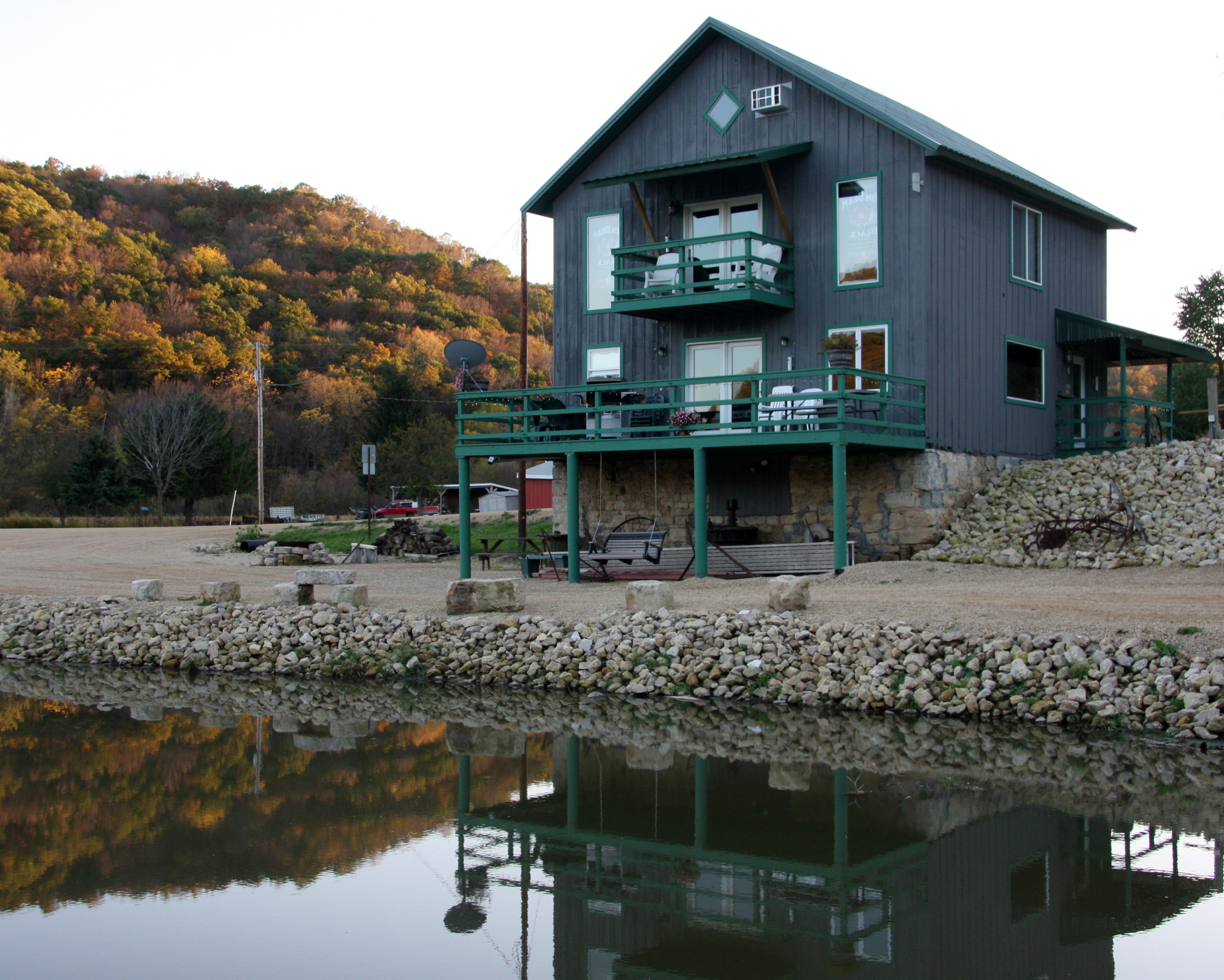

- Location within Minnesota
- Nearest city: Eitzen, Minnesota, U.S.
- Coordinates: 43°32′19″N 91°24′44″W
- Area: less than one acre
- Built: 1877
- MPS: Houston County MRA
- NRHP reference No.: 82002966
- Added to NRHP: April 6, 1982

The Johnson Mill, also known as the Charles Johnson Mill, is a historic flour mill site in Houston County, Minnesota. It is listed on the National Register of Historic Places since 1982, under the name "Johnson Mill".

== History ==
It is the site of the former township of Winnebago Valley, now abandoned. Winnebago Township had two crossroads communities, about a mile apart, with each served by a mill, an associated store, a blacksmith shop, and other buildings.

Along Winnebago Creek, the original mill was built in the early 1860s, razed in 1877, and replaced by the current mill building.

The Johnson Mill, or "upper mill", was a flour mill designed to serve local farmers, since it had low horsepower and limited milling capacity. At some unknown point, the mill ceased production, but the mill survives as one of two dozen water powered flour mills in Minnesota.

== Notable residents of Winnebago Valley ==
- Samuel C. Polley (1864–1949) lawyer and judge

== See also ==
- National Register of Historic Places listings in Houston County, Minnesota
