= Jefferson Grain Warehouse =

- U.S. National Register of Historic Places
- The Jefferson Grain Warehouse from the southwest

- Location within Minnesota Location within the United States
- Location: Off Minnesota State Highway 26, Jefferson Township, Minnesota
- Coordinates: 43°31′0″N 91°16′46″W
- Area: Less than one acre
- Built: 1868
- Built by: William Robinson
- NRHP reference No.: 94001386
- Designated: November 25, 1994

The Jefferson Grain Warehouse is a historic warehouse in Jefferson Township, Minnesota, United States, built in 1868 on the bank of the Mississippi River. The warehouse was listed on the National Register of Historic Places in 1994 for having local significance in the themes of commerce and transportation. It was nominated for being a rare surviving reminder of a brief period when wheat was becoming the most important agricultural crop of the Upper Midwest yet steamboats were still the leading form of transportation.

== History ==
In 1868 the grain trade in Minnesota was growing, but few railroads existed in the state. Steamboats were the supreme mode of transportation. William Robinson of Allamakee County, Iowa, built a grain warehouse on the banks of the Mississippi to take advantage of the steamboat traffic. Shortly afterward the town of Jefferson was platted. In a few years, however, the railroad came through, and a larger town was platted to the south. The Jefferson Grain Warehouse quickly became obsolete.

When William Robinson built his warehouse in Jefferson, the closest shipping points on the Mississippi River were at Brownsville, Minnesota, and Lansing, Iowa, about 13 miles (21 km) and 10 miles (16 km) distant, respectively. For farmers in the Iowa–Minnesota border area it was a long trek to either port. Good landing sites were not common in the region. This made the location of the Jefferson Warehouse advantageous. The Jefferson Warehouse became an important storage facility and shipping point for grain harvested in the Portland Prairie area, which was located on both sides of the Iowa–Minnesota border.

The warehouse was constructed of wood and limestone and sat about 1 mile (1.6 km) north of the Iowa border in Houston County, Minnesota. The rear of the building edged up to the water, making for easy transport. The Jefferson Warehouse was typical of grain warehouses of the time. Riverside warehouses were called "flat tops" to distinguish them from later grain elevators. Like the Jefferson Warehouse, others were usually built on a slope so grain could be received in one end and shipped out the other.

In 1869, Robinson and another Allamakee County man, R.P. Spencer, platted the village of Jefferson around the warehouse. A few hotels and houses were built along a single half-mile street. For a short time the village of Jefferson was on the rise, but the railroads were pushing westward. The Chicago, Dubuque and Minnesota Railroad reached the area of Jefferson in 1871. The railroad company platted New Albin to the south in Iowa. New Albin quickly became a grain trading hub based on railroad transport. A year later, Robinson died. Spencer could see that if the fledgling village of Jefferson were to survive it would have to work with the railroad. In 1872 the village was replatted with the railroad running where the main road had been.

It is unknown whether steamboats or the railroad used the Jefferson Warehouse after 1872. In 1876 the building was abandoned, and in 1881 it was sold, along with all the lots east of the railroad. Afterward, Jefferson, like many other "paper towns," ceased to exist. The buildings that remained were demolished in 1940 to make way for Minnesota State Highway 26. The Jefferson Warehouse was the only structure to endure. In the 21st century it is the only remaining riverside grain warehouse in Minnesota. For that reason, and because of its unique moment in history, it was placed on the National Register of Historic Places.

== See also ==
- National Register of Historic Places listings in Houston County, Minnesota
