= Wilmington =

Wilmington may refer to:

== Places ==
=== Australia ===
- Wilmington, South Australia, a town and locality
  - District Council of Wilmington, a former local government area
  - Wilmington railway line, a former railway line

=== United Kingdom ===
- Wilmington, Devon
- Wilmington, East Sussex
- Wilmington, Kent
- Wilmington, Kingston upon Hull, East Riding of Yorkshire
- Wilmington, Somerset
- Lordship of Wilmington, an ancient manor in Kent in the parish of Sellindge

=== United States ===
- Wilmington, Los Angeles, California, a neighborhood
- Wilmington, Delaware
- Wilmington Hundred, New Castle County, Delaware
- Wilmington, Greene County, Illinois
- Wilmington, Will County, Illinois
- Wilmington, Indiana
- Wilmington, Kansas
- Wilmington, Massachusetts
  - Wilmington station (MBTA), commuter rail station
  - Wilmington High School (Massachusetts)
- Wilmington Township, Minnesota
- Wilmington, Minnesota
- Wilmington, New York, a town
  - Wilmington (CDP), New York, the main hamlet in the town
- Wilmington, North Carolina
- Wilmington, Ohio
- Wilmington Township, Lawrence County, Pennsylvania
- Wilmington Township, Mercer County, Pennsylvania
- Wilmington, Vermont, a New England town
  - Wilmington (CDP), Vermont, the main village in the town
- Wilmington, Virginia
- Wilmington Island, Georgia
  - Wilmington River (Georgia)
- Wilmington Manor, Delaware
- New Wilmington, Pennsylvania, in Lawrence County
- South Wilmington, Illinois, in Grundy County

== People ==
- Spencer Compton, 1st Earl of Wilmington (1673–1743), British Prime Minister, 1742–1743, who gave his name to many of the places called Wilmington
- Earl of Wilmington, a title in the Peerage of Great Britain created in 1730 for Spencer Compton
- Lord of Wilmington, an abbreviation of Lord of the Manor of Wilmington, a feudal dignity relating to land originally granted under an Anglo-Saxon charter of 700 C.E.

== Educational institutions ==
- Wilmington College (Ohio), Wilmington, Ohio
- Wilmington University, New Castle, Delaware
- University of North Carolina at Wilmington, Wilmington, North Carolina

== Other uses ==
- USS Wilmington, any of several ships in the United States fleet
- Wilmington massacre
- Wilmington plc, a British publishing and business information company
- Wilmington Subdivision, a railroad line in North Carolina

== See also ==
- Wilmington station (disambiguation)
