= Crooked Creek (Houston County, Minnesota) =

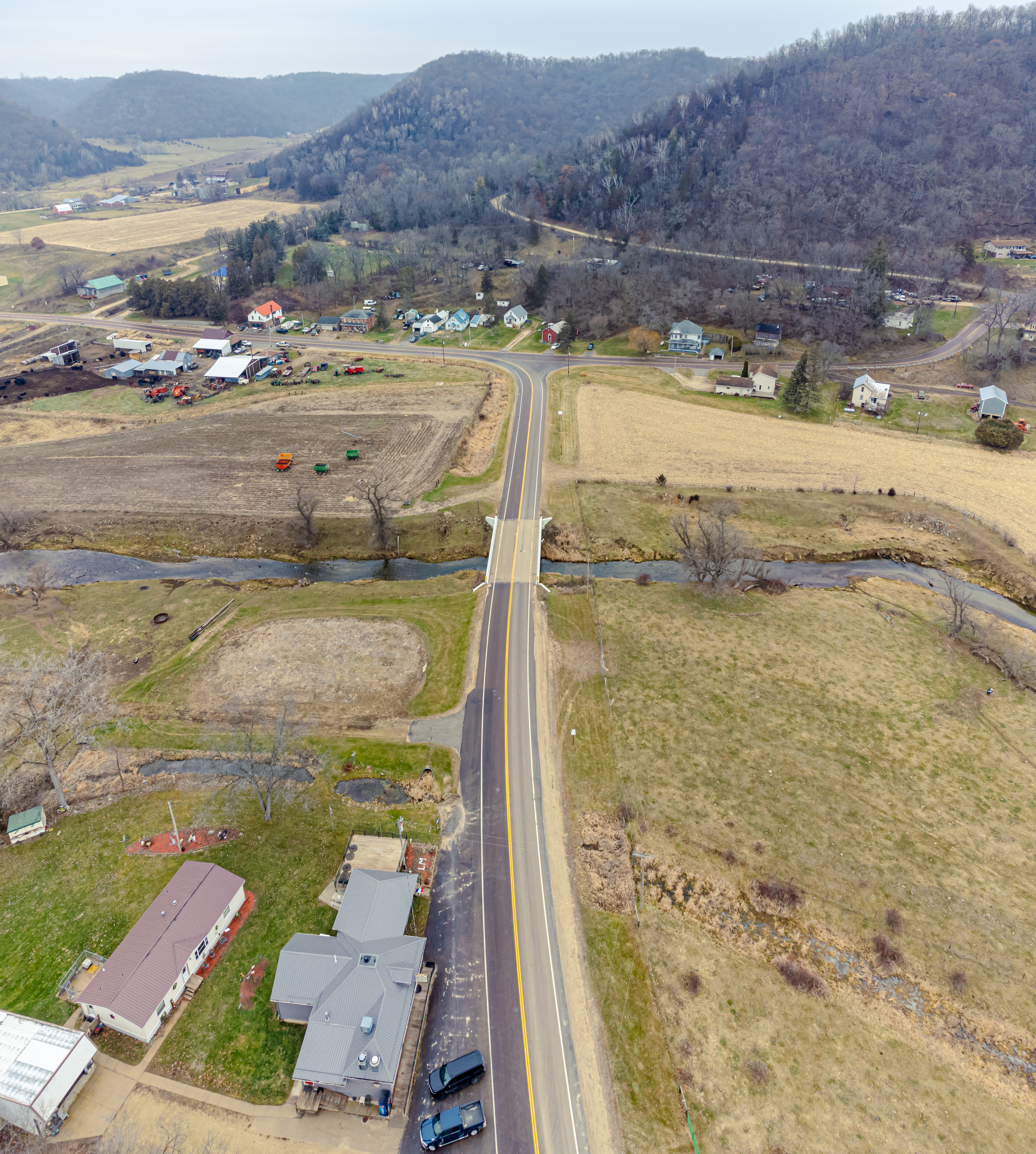
- Crooked Creek flowing through Freeburg, Minnesota

- Mouth of the Crooked Creek

Location
- Country: United States
- State: Minnesota
- County: Houston

Physical characteristics
- Source
  - coordinates: 43.6083034°N 91.3995823°W
- Mouth
  - coordinates: 43.5733048°N 91.2684671°W

Basin features
- River system: Upper Mississippi River
- Tributaries
  - left: Ball Park Tributary, Tributary 5
  - right: South Fork Crooked Creek, Goetziner Tributary

Crooked Creek is a stream in Houston County, in the U.S. state of Minnesota. Crooked Creek was so named on account of its irregular course.

== Habitat ==
Crooked Creek is in Driftless Area. The Minnesota Department of Natural Resources reports that species present in Crooked Creek include Brown trout, brook trout, rainbow trout, golden redhorse, white sucker, common carp, creek chub, longnose dace, central stoneroller, yellow bullhead, central mudminnow, northern pike, rock bass, bluegill, black crappie, green sunfish, yellow perch, logperch, Iowa darter, sauger, freshwater drum, American brook lamprey, longnose gar, and brook stickleback. Crooked Creek was first survey in 1921. Its mouth is currently one mile north of Reno, Minnesota. Habitat improvement took place on Crooked Creek in 1974, 1978, and 1984.

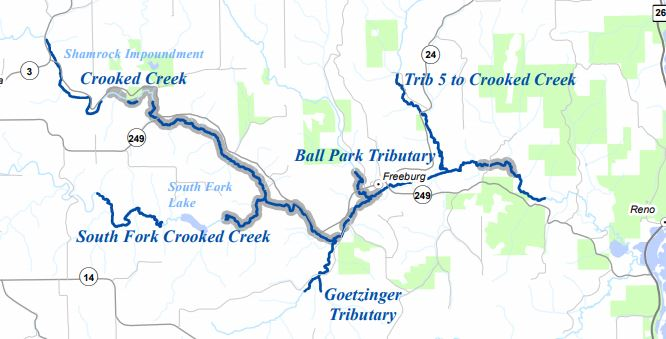
Map of Crooked Creek and tributaries

== See also ==
- List of rivers of Minnesota
