= River Junction =

River Junction may refer to:

== Places ==
United States

- River Junction, Iowa
- River Junction, Minnesota
- River Junction AVA, viticultural area in California
