= Houston County Airport (Minnesota) =

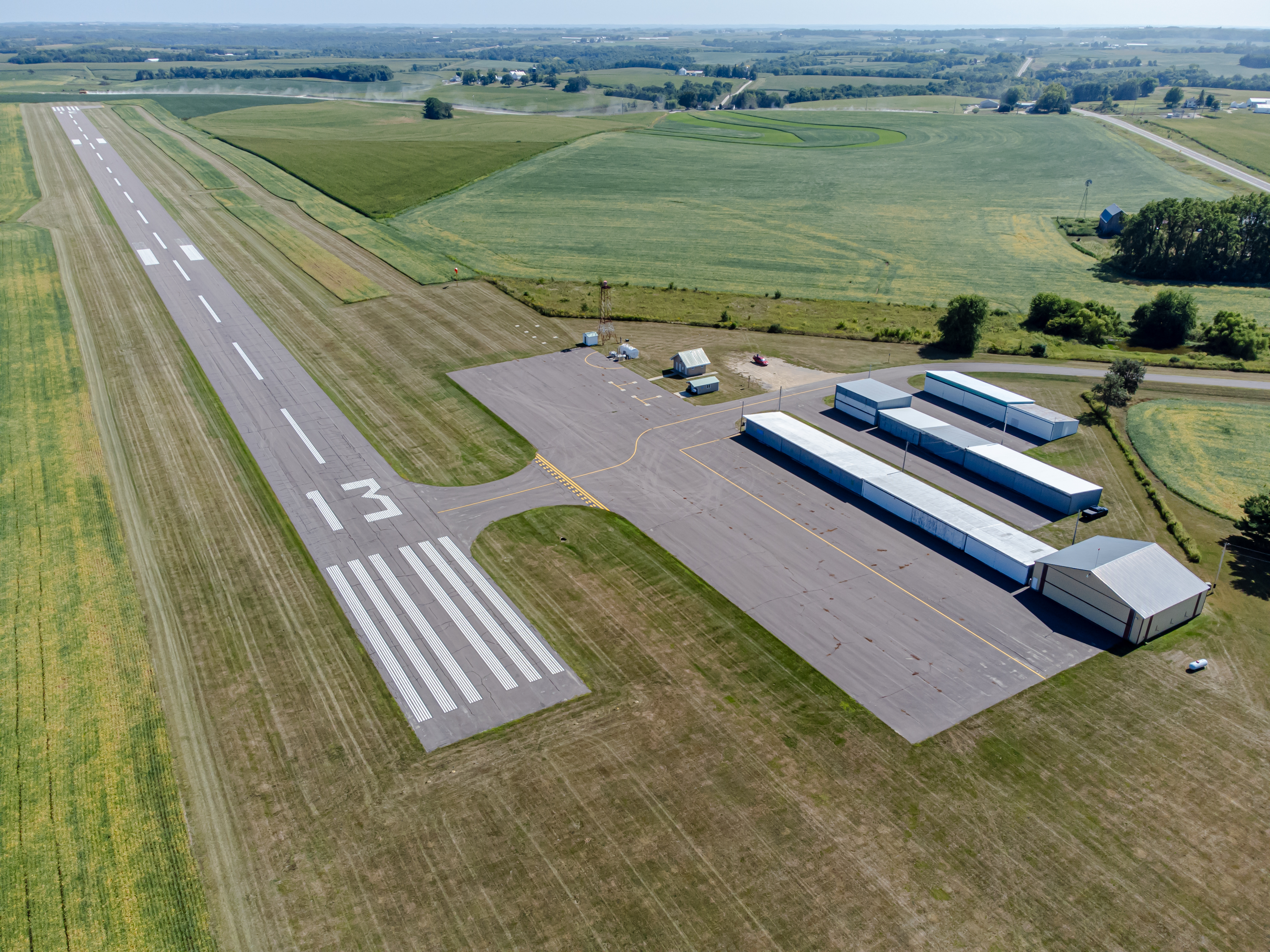
- IATA: none; ICAO: KCHU; FAA LID: CHU

Summary
- Airport type: Public
- Owner: Houston County
- Location: Caledonia, Minnesota
- Opened: 1968
- Elevation AMSL: 1,179 ft (359 m)
- Coordinates: 43°35′47″N 091°30′14″W

Map
- Location of airport in Minnesota/United States CHU (the United States)

Runways
Direction	Length		Surface
Direction	ft	m	Surface
13/31	3,499	1,066	Asphalt

Statistics (2018)
- Aircraft operations (year ending 4/30/2018): 3,500
- Based aircraft: 13
- Source: Federal Aviation Administration

Houston County Airport (ICAO: KCHU, FAA LID: CHU) is a public use airport located three miles (5 km) south of the central business district of Caledonia, a city in Houston County, Minnesota, United States. It is owned by Houston County. It serves general aviation for Caledonia and surrounding towns including Spring Grove and Houston. There is no scheduled air service. The airport opened in 1968. The dedication of the completed airport was held on September 21, 1969.

Although most U.S. airports use the same three-letter location identifier for the FAA and IATA, Houston County Airport is assigned CHU by the FAA but has no designation from the IATA (which assigned CHU to Chuathbaluk Airport in Chuathbaluk, Alaska).

== Facilities and aircraft ==
Houston County Airport covers an area of 52 acres (21 ha) which contains one asphalt paved runway, 13/31, measuring 3,499 by 77 feet (1,066 m × 23 m).

For the 12-month period ending April 30, 2018, the airport had 3,500 aircraft operations, 100% of which are general aviation.

== Events ==
The Houston County Flyers sponsors a fly-in breakfast at the airport on the last Sunday in June.

The Caledonia Hot Air Balloon Rally is held on the first weekend in December.

== See also ==
- List of airports in Minnesota
- Rushford Municipal Airport
- La Crosse Regional Airport
