= Newhouse, Minnesota =

Unincorporated community in Minnesota, United States

Newhouse
- Unincorporated community
- Location within Minnesota Location within the United States
- Coordinates: 43°31′30″N 91°42′01″W
- Country: United States
- State: Minnesota
- County: Houston
- Elevation: 1,197 ft (365 m)
- Time zone: UTC-6 (Central (CST))
  - Summer (DST): UTC-5 (CDT)
- Area code: 507
- GNIS feature ID: 654846

Newhouse is an unincorporated community in Spring Grove, Houston County, Minnesota, United States.
