= Hokah =

Hokah can refer to a location in the United States:

- Hokah, Minnesota, a small city
- Hokah Township, Houston County, Minnesota

== See also ==
- Hookah
