= George Harold Lommen =

American lawyer and politician

George Harold Lommen (September 14, 1895 – September 19, 1942) was an American lawyer and politician.

Lommen was born in Caledonia, Houston County, Minnesota. His grandfather was among the first settlers in southeastern Minnesota, arriving in Houston County in 1850, and his father, John P. Lommen, was born there in 1852. Lommen lost his mother at the age of seven. He graduated from Caledonia High School, where he was a member of the state championship high school debating team in 1913. He went out on his own at the age of seventeen.

He completed his law degree at the St. Paul College of Law (now Mitchell Hamline School of Law) in 1917. Lommen began practicing law in Biwabik, St. Louis County, Minnesota, where he served as mayor for two terms and also held the position of Biwabik Township Attorney. He later moved to Eveleth, Minnesota. Lommen served one term in the Minnesota House of Representatives from 1925 to 1926. He was then elected to the Minnesota Senate in 1927 and served continuously until his death in 1942, at which time he was serving his fourth term. He was a Republican.

When Lommen became seriously ill, he sought treatment at the Mayo Clinic, where he learned that his condition was terminal. He returned to his birthplace in Caledonia, where he died on September 19, 1942. He was buried in the cemetery in his hometown of Caledonia, Minnesota.
