= Sheldon Township =

Sheldon Township may refer to the following townships in the United States:

- Sheldon Township, Iroquois County, Illinois
- Sheldon Township, Houston County, Minnesota

== See also ==
- Port Sheldon Township, Michigan
