= Wilmington, South Australia (disambiguation) =

Wilmington, South Australia is a town and locality

Wilmington, South Australia may also refer to.

- District Council of Wilmington, a former local government area
- Wilmington railway line, a former railway line
- Wilmington Primary School - refer List of schools in South Australia#U-Z (GP)

== See also ==
- Wilmington (disambiguation)
