= Brownsville Township =

Brownsville Township may refer to the following townships in the United States:

- Brownsville Township, Union County, Indiana
- Brownsville Township, Houston County, Minnesota
- Brownsville Township, Fayette County, Pennsylvania
