= Winnebago Creek (Minnesota) =

- Mouth of Winnebago Creek

Location
- Country: United States
- States: Minnesota
- Counties: Houston County
- Cities: Wilmington, Minnesota

Physical characteristics
- Source
  - location: Wilmington, Houston County, Minnesota
  - coordinates: 43.586358°N 91.5701431°W
- Mouth
  - location: Reno, Houston County, Minnesota
  - coordinates: 43.5099729°N 91.2629110°W
- Length: 23.6-mile-long (38.0 km)

Basin features
- River system: Upper Mississippi River
- Tributaries
  - left: Burg Creek, Unnamed Creek
  - right: Eitzen Creek, New Yorker Hollow

Winnebago Creek is a 23.6-mile-long (38.0 km) tributary of the Mississippi River in southeastern Minnesota. Winnebago Creek was named after the Winnebago Indians.

== Course ==
Winnebago Creek flows in Houston County, Minnesota into the Mississippi River just above the Minnesota and Iowa border. The creek flows through the Winnebago Creek Wildlife Management Area. Sections of Winnebago Creek are designated trout streams and populated with Rainbow trout and brown trout.

== See also ==
- List of rivers of Minnesota
- Winnebago, Minnesota
