= Portland Prairie Methodist Episcopal Church =

Historic church in Minnesota, United States

- U.S. National Register of Historic Places
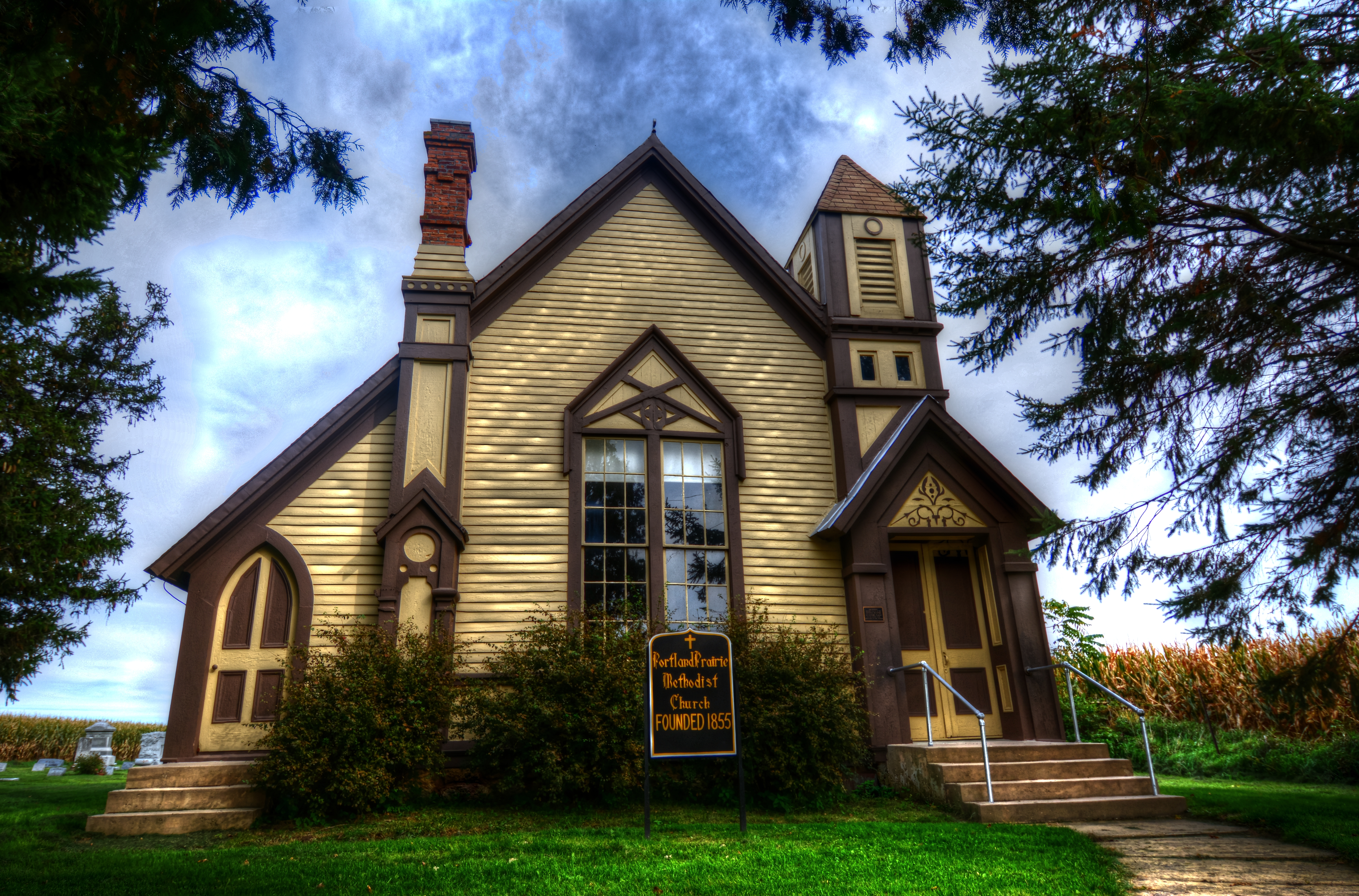

- Location within Minnesota Location within the United States
- Nearest city: Eitzen, Minnesota
- Coordinates: 43°31′33″N 91°29′28″W
- Area: less than one acre
- Built: 1876
- Built by: Mr. Tuttle
- Architectural style: Stick/Eastlake
- MPS: Houston County MRA
- NRHP reference No.: 82002967
- Added to NRHP: April 6, 1982

Portland Prairie Methodist Episcopal Church (Portland Prairie United Methodist Church) is a historic church in Eitzen, Minnesota.

The church was built by a Mr. Tuttle of New Albin, Iowa from plans he obtained in St. Paul, Minnesota, although it is unknown whether the plans were designed by an architect. The building was completed in 1876 at a cost of $1540. It is a fine example of Eastlake architecture, with plenty of attention to detail and good use of decorative wood trim. It is a wood-frame structure on a stone foundation, with clapboard siding and a steep gable roof clad in metal.

The congregation was composed mostly of Yankees from New York and New England. It was served by a circuit rider from Caledonia between 1855 and 1876. Presumably, the settlers wanted a church with English style influences. The active congregation moved to Caledonia in 1935, but the Eitzen building is used a few times a year. On the last Sunday in July, there is a service and celebration in the large yard.

It was listed on the National Register of Historic Places in 1982.
