= Houston County Courthouse =

Houston County Courthouse may refer to:

- Houston County Courthouse (Alabama), Dothan, Alabama
- Houston County Courthouse (Georgia), Perry, Georgia
- Houston County Courthouse and Jail, Caledonia, Minnesota
- Houston County Courthouse (Tennessee), Erin, Tennessee
- Houston County Courthouse (Texas), Crockett, Texas, listed on the National Register of Historic Places
