= Maurice J. McCauley =

American politician

Maurice J. "Mac, M. J." McCauley (June 7, 1923 – December 8, 2013) was an American teacher and politician.

Born near Caledonia, Minnesota, McCauley served in the United States Marine Corps during World War II. McCauley went to the University of Notre Dame and the University of Minnesota. He received his bachelor's degree from the University of Wisconsin–La Crosse and his master's degree from Arizona State University. He taught physics and science in junior and senior high school and at Winona State University. McCauley served as Houston County, Minnesota Clerk of Court, County Commissioner for Winona County, Minnesota and then served in the Minnesota House of Representatives from 1971 to 1977 from Winona County. McCauley was a Republican. McCauley died at his home in Winona, Minnesota.
