= Caledonia Public Library =

- 43.6344135°N 91.49514088°W
- Location: 231 East Main Street; Caledonia MN 55921

Other information
- Director: Stephanie Eggert (since 2019)
- Employees: 8
- Website: https://caledonia.lib.mn.us/

The Caledonia Public Library is a public library in Caledonia, Minnesota. It is a member of Southeastern Libraries Cooperating, the SE Minnesota library region.

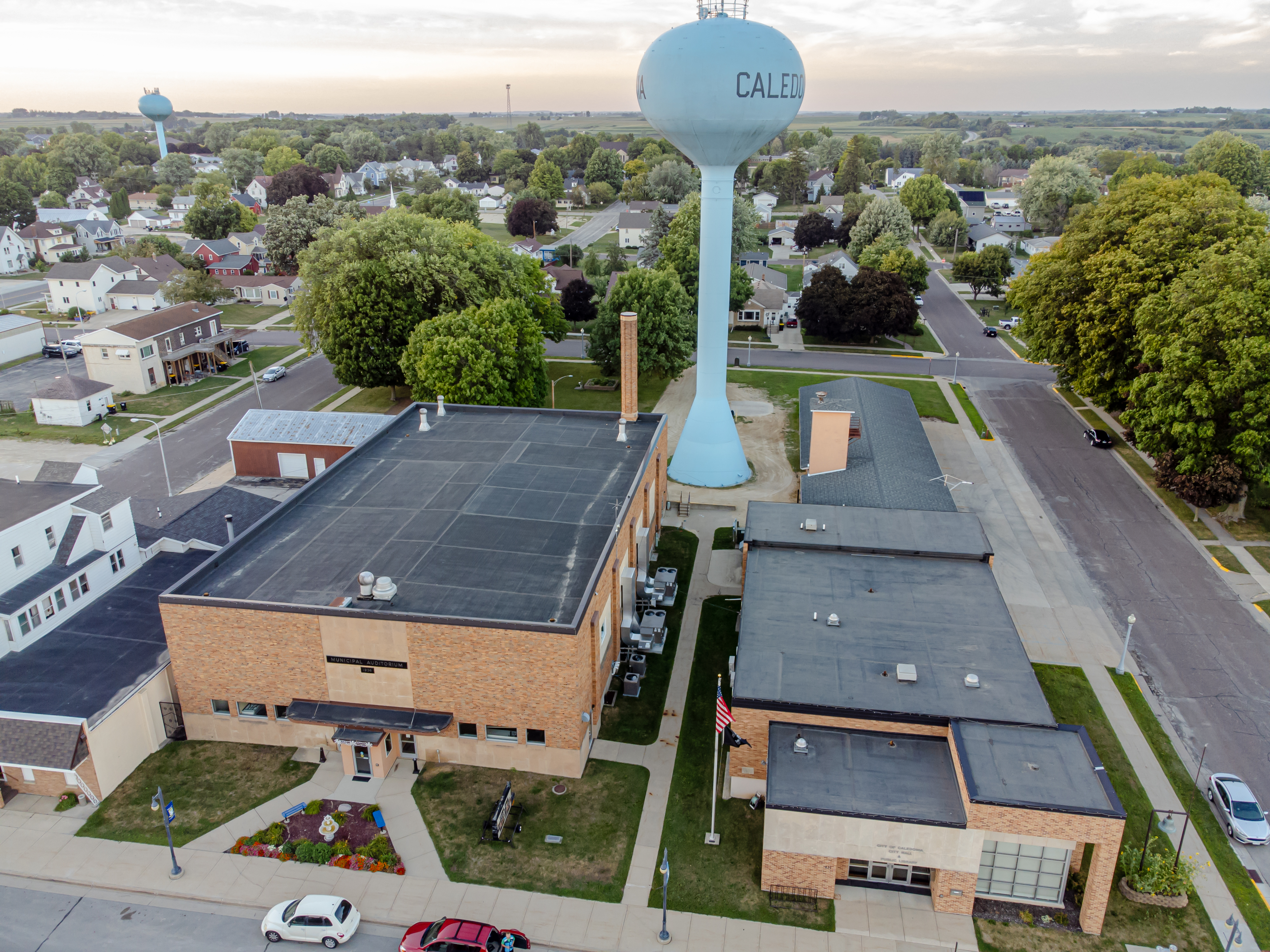
Caledonia city hall (left) and Caledonia Public Library (right)
