= Freeburg, Minnesota =

Unincorporated community in Minnesota, United States

Freeburg
- Unincorporated community
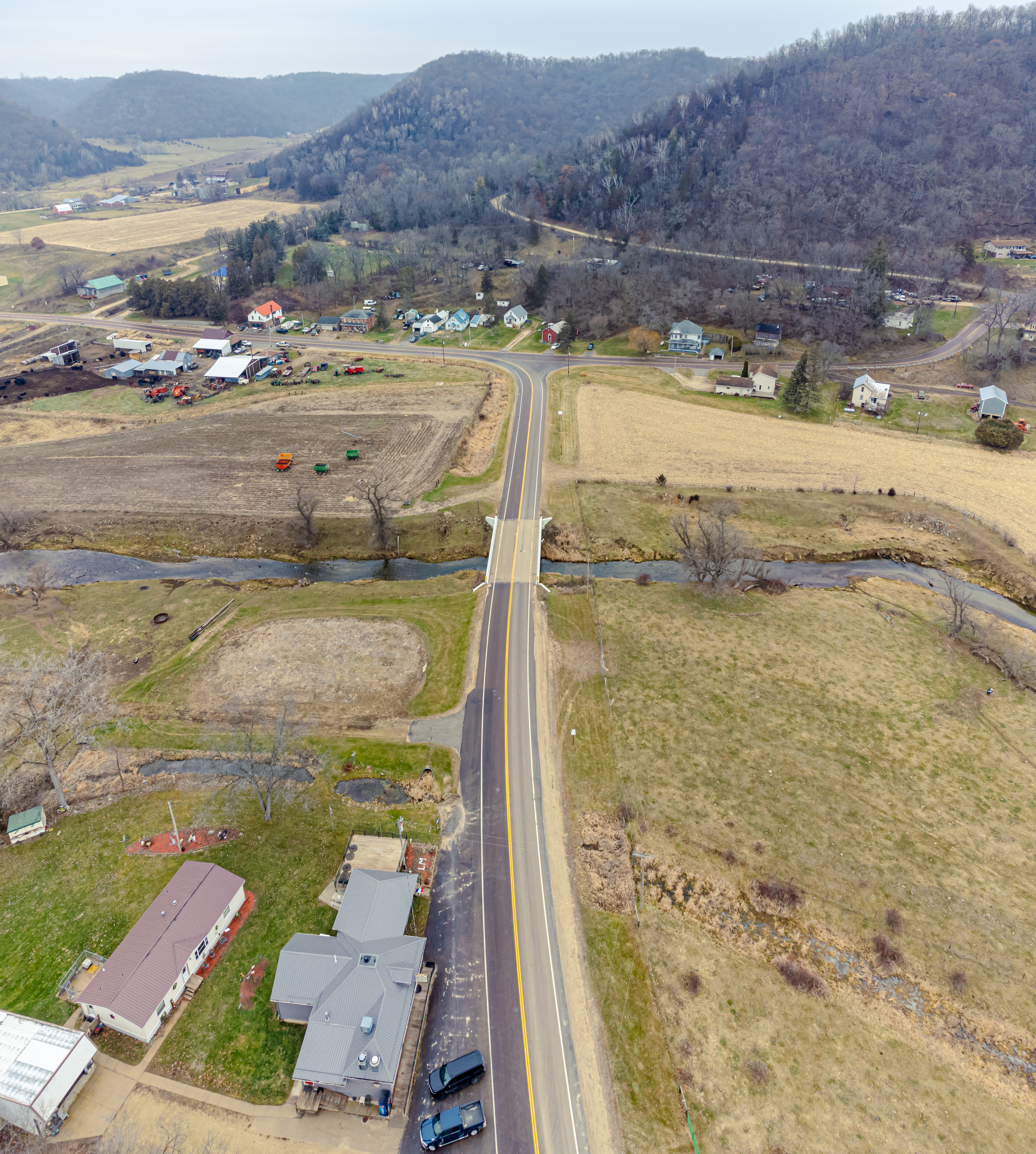
- Crooked Creek flows through town

- Location within Minnesota Location within the United States
- Coordinates: 43°36′40″N 91°21′51″W
- Country: United States
- State: Minnesota
- County: Houston
- Elevation: 686 ft (209 m)
- Time zone: UTC-6 (Central (CST))
  - Summer (DST): UTC-5 (CDT)
- Area code: 507
- GNIS feature ID: 643918

Freeburg is an unincorporated community in Houston County, in the U.S. state of Minnesota.

== History ==
A post office was established at Freeburg in 1858, and remained in operation until it was discontinued in 1947. The community was originally built up chiefly by Germans, who named it after the city of Freiburg, Germany.
