= Sheldon, Minnesota =

Unincorporated community in Minnesota, United States

Sheldon
- Unincorporated community
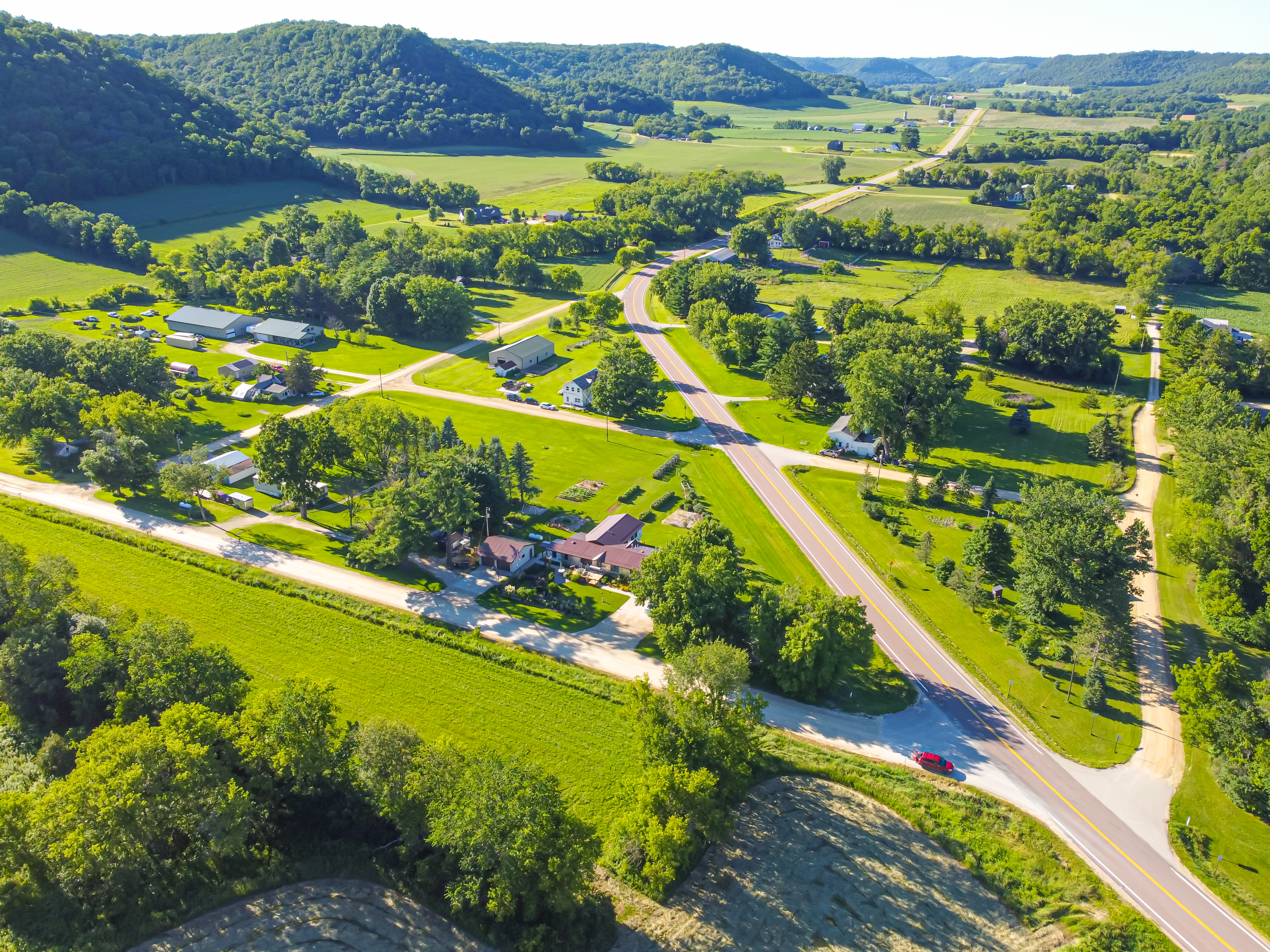
- Houston County Roads 10 and 11 junction in town

- Location within Minnesota Location within the United States
- Coordinates: 43°40′42″N 91°35′36″W
- Country: United States
- State: Minnesota
- County: Houston
- Elevation: 758 ft (231 m)
- Time zone: UTC-6 (Central (CST))
  - Summer (DST): UTC-5 (CDT)
- Area code: 507
- GNIS feature ID: 651939

Sheldon is an unincorporated community in the Sheldon Township in Houston County, in the U.S. state of Minnesota.

== History ==
A post office was established at Sheldon in 1856, and remained in operation until it was discontinued in 1903. The community was named for one of its founders, Julius C. Sheldon.
