= Willington Grove, Minnesota =

Unincorporated community in Minnesota, United States

Willington Grove
- Unincorporated community
- Location within Minnesota Location within the United States
- Coordinates: 43°34′42″N 91°34′45″W
- Country: United States
- State: Minnesota
- County: Houston
- Elevation: 1,299 ft (396 m)
- Time zone: UTC-6 (Central (CST))
  - Summer (DST): UTC-5 (CDT)
- Area code: 507
- GNIS feature ID: 655012

Willington Grove is an unincorporated community in Houston County, Minnesota, United States.
