= Wilmington station =

Wilmington station may refer to:

- Wilmington station (Delaware), officially the Joseph R. Biden Jr., Railroad Station, formerly known as Pennsylvania Station, as well as French Street Station
- Water Street Station in Wilmington, Delaware
- North Wilmington station, Massachusetts
- Wilmington station (MBTA), Massachusetts
- Imperial/Wilmington station, Los Angeles
- Union Station (Wilmington, North Carolina)
- Wilmington railway station (England), Kingston upon Hull

== See also ==
- Wilmington (disambiguation)
