= Brownsville Township, Houston County, Minnesota =

Brownsville Township, Minnesota
- Township
- Location within the state of Minnesota Brownsville Township, Minnesota (the United States)
- Coordinates: 43°41′31″N 91°18′15″W
- Country: United States
- State: Minnesota
- County: Houston

Area
  - Total: 29.6 sq mi (76.6 km^{2})
  - Land: 28.5 sq mi (73.7 km^{2})
  - Water: 1.1 sq mi (2.9 km^{2})
- Elevation: 719 ft (219 m)

Population (2000)
  - Total: 462
  - Density: 16/sq mi (6.3/km^{2})
- Time zone: UTC-6 (Central (CST))
  - Summer (DST): UTC-5 (CDT)
- ZIP code: 55919
- Area code: 507
- FIPS code: 27-08236
- GNIS feature ID: 0663686

Brownsville Township is a township in Houston County, Minnesota, United States. The population was 462 at the 2000 census.

Brownsville Township was organized in 1858, and named after its largest settlement, Brownsville.

== Geography ==
According to the United States Census Bureau, the township has a total area of 29.6 square miles (77 km^{2}), of which 28.5 square miles (74 km^{2}) is land and 1.1 square miles (2.8 km^{2}) (3.75%) is water.

== Demographics ==
As of the census of 2000, there were 462 people, 165 households, and 134 families residing in the township. The population density was 16.2 inhabitants per square mile (6.3/km^{2}). There were 249 housing units at an average density of 8.8 per square mile (3.4/km^{2}). The racial makeup of the township was 98.92% White, 0.22% Native American, 0.43% Asian, and 0.43% from two or more races.

There were 165 households, out of which 37.6% had children under the age of 18 living with them, 73.3% were married couples living together, 3.6% had a female householder with no husband present, and 18.2% were non-families. 14.5% of all households were made up of individuals, and 3.6% had someone living alone who was 65 years of age or older. The average household size was 2.80 and the average family size was 3.04.

In the township the population was spread out, with 28.1% under the age of 18, 7.4% from 18 to 24, 26.8% from 25 to 44, 28.6% from 45 to 64, and 9.1% who were 65 years of age or older. The median age was 38 years. For every 100 females, there were 107.2 males. For every 100 females age 18 and over, there were 114.2 males.

The median income for a household in the township was $45,625, and the median income for a family was $47,500. Males had a median income of $31,250 versus $23,125 for females. The per capita income for the township was $17,552. About 9.3% of families and 12.0% of the population were below the poverty line, including 15.3% of those under age 18 and 7.0% of those age 65 or over.
