= Lordship of Wilmington =

Wilmington is the name of a lordship or manor or reputed lordship or manor in Sellindge, in the Folkestone and Hythe borough of Kent, to which the feudal title Lady of Wilmington relates, which has some of the earliest examples of surviving Anglo-Saxon charters, and is particularly noted for the observation of changes to its placename during its early history. The other Wilmington in Kent is a populous parish, near Dartford.

== Initial grant and extent ==
In the year 700 C.E. Wihtred, King of Kent, granted four ploughlands to the Church of St. Mary at Lyminge. A copy of the charter was produced in the early eighth century. Both versions carry endorsements or alterations from the ninth century to accommodate changes to the placename.

In 700, the lands were described as Pleghelmestun, 'the tùn of Pleghelm', consisting of four ploughlands, between the three boundaries of Bereueg, Meguines paeth and Stretleg, said to be well-known at the time. Their position has been suggested by Gordon Ward. This original, longer charter also included a grant of lands for the grazing of 300 sheep at Rumining seta, in Romney Marsh. This is the first historical document, then, on the Romney Marshes and demonstrates the connection between landholdings in the uplands and the detached marsh lands. This remote marshland holding was argued by Gordon Ward to be Sellindge in the Marsh, latterly part of the parish of Dymchurch.

== Endorsements to the first charter ==
One ninth-century hand has added the words daes landes boc aet berwicum or 'the land-book (charter granting land) at Berwick', Berwick being the name of the neighbouring estate to the east. A separate scribe of the same period has endorsed the charter, nunc wigelmignctun, or 'now Wighelm's tun'. Thus by the ninth century, the estate had gained its new name, Wi(g)lmington.

== The second charter ==
This copy of the grant is similarly modified by a ninth-century scribe. Here, the first two letters of Pleghelmestun, are crossed out and are replaced with the period's alternative spelling to 'Wi', Ƿi, giving rise to Wieghelmestun, or 'the tun of Wieghelm', showing an attempt to tie the earlier name with its later version.

== Lord or Lady of Wilmington ==
Lord of Wilmington or Lady of Wilmington is an alternative form of Lord of the Manor of Wilmington or Lady of the Manor of Wilmington and is the style borne by the holder of the lordship of the manor. Two old manors were held of Sellindge manor:

- Wilmington which lost its physical counterpart (appurtenances) when it came into the same ownership as the manor of Sellindge itself
- Somerfield likewise, except identifiable with Somerfield Court Farm.

After personal merger, conveyances continued to record the transfer of the manors distinctly, and separate Courts Baron were held for each.
