= Mound Prairie Township, Houston County, Minnesota =

Mound Prairie Township, Minnesota
- Township
- Location within the state of Minnesota Mound Prairie Township, Minnesota (the United States)
- Coordinates: 43°46′33″N 91°25′50″W
- Country: United States
- State: Minnesota
- County: Houston

Area
  - Total: 36.8 sq mi (95.2 km^{2})
  - Land: 36.3 sq mi (93.9 km^{2})
  - Water: 0.50 sq mi (1.3 km^{2})
- Elevation: 663 ft (202 m)

Population (2000)
  - Total: 661
  - Density: 18/sq mi (7/km^{2})
- Time zone: UTC-6 (Central (CST))
  - Summer (DST): UTC-5 (CDT)
- FIPS code: 27-44512
- GNIS feature ID: 0665051

Mound Prairie Township is a township in Houston County, Minnesota, United States. The population was 661 at the 2000 census.

== History ==
Mound Prairie Township was organized in 1860, and named after a nearby hill surrounded by prairie.

== Geography ==
According to the United States Census Bureau, the township has a total area of 36.8 square miles (95.2 km^{2}), of which 36.2 square miles (93.9 km^{2}) is land and 0.5 square mile (1.3 km^{2}) (1.39%) is water.

== Demographics ==
As of the census of 2000, there were 661 people, 228 households, and 186 families residing in the township. The population density was 18.2 people per square mile (7.0/km^{2}). There were 233 housing units at an average density of 6.4/sq mi (2.5/km^{2}). The racial makeup of the township was 98.64% White, 0.15% Native American, 0.45% Asian, and 0.76% from two or more races. Hispanic or Latino of any race were 0.15% of the population.

There were 228 households, out of which 42.1% had children under the age of 18 living with them, 68.4% were married couples living together, 6.1% had a female householder with no husband present, and 18.0% were non-families. 12.7% of all households were made up of individuals, and 5.3% had someone living alone who was 65 years of age or older. The average household size was 2.90 and the average family size was 3.19.

In the township the population was spread out, with 31.0% under the age of 18, 7.0% from 18 to 24, 30.4% from 25 to 44, 23.8% from 45 to 64, and 7.9% who were 65 years of age or older. The median age was 36 years. For every 100 females, there were 110.5 males. For every 100 females age 18 and over, there were 110.1 males.

The median income for a household in the township was $50,234, and the median income for a family was $52,159. Males had a median income of $32,969 versus $26,667 for females. The per capita income for the township was $19,487. About 1.6% of families and 2.4% of the population were below the poverty line, including none of those under age 18 and 9.0% of those age 65 or over.
