= Sheldon Township, Houston County, Minnesota =

Sheldon Township, Minnesota
- Township
- Location within the state of Minnesota Sheldon Township, Minnesota (the United States)
- Coordinates: 43°42′15″N 91°33′6″W
- Country: United States
- State: Minnesota
- County: Houston

Area
  - Total: 29.8 sq mi (77.1 km^{2})
  - Land: 29.8 sq mi (77.1 km^{2})
  - Water: 0 sq mi (0.0 km^{2})
- Elevation: 761 ft (232 m)

Population (2000)
  - Total: 289
  - Density: 9.6/sq mi (3.7/km^{2})
- Time zone: UTC-6 (Central (CST))
  - Summer (DST): UTC-5 (CDT)
- FIPS code: 27-59494
- GNIS feature ID: 0665587

Sheldon Township is a township in Houston County, Minnesota, United States. The population was 289 at the 2000 census.

Sheldon Township was organized in 1858, and named after the community of Sheldon.

== Geography ==
According to the United States Census Bureau, the township has a total area of 29.8 square miles (77.1 km^{2}), all land.

== Demographics ==
As of the census of 2000, there were 289 people, 109 households, and 85 families residing in the township. The population density was 9.7 people per square mile (3.7/km^{2}). There were 117 housing units at an average density of 3.9/sq mi (1.5/km^{2}). The racial makeup of the township was 99.31% White and 0.69% African American.

There were 109 households, out of which 32.1% had children under the age of 18 living with them, 68.8% were married couples living together, 5.5% had a female householder with no husband present, and 22.0% were non-families. 16.5% of all households were made up of individuals, and 5.5% had someone living alone who was 65 years of age or older. The average household size was 2.65 and the average family size was 2.98.

In the township the population was spread out, with 23.5% under the age of 18, 6.2% from 18 to 24, 27.0% from 25 to 44, 27.0% from 45 to 64, and 16.3% who were 65 years of age or older. The median age was 42 years. For every 100 females, there were 106.4 males. For every 100 females age 18 and over, there were 106.5 males.

The median income for a household in the township was $40,625, and the median income for a family was $45,208. Males had a median income of $22,813 versus $23,750 for females. The per capita income for the township was $16,918. About 13.8% of families and 12.2% of the population were below the poverty line, including 17.7% of those under the age of eighteen and 11.1% of those 65 or over.
