= Spring Grove Township, Houston County, Minnesota =

Spring Grove Township, Minnesota
- Township
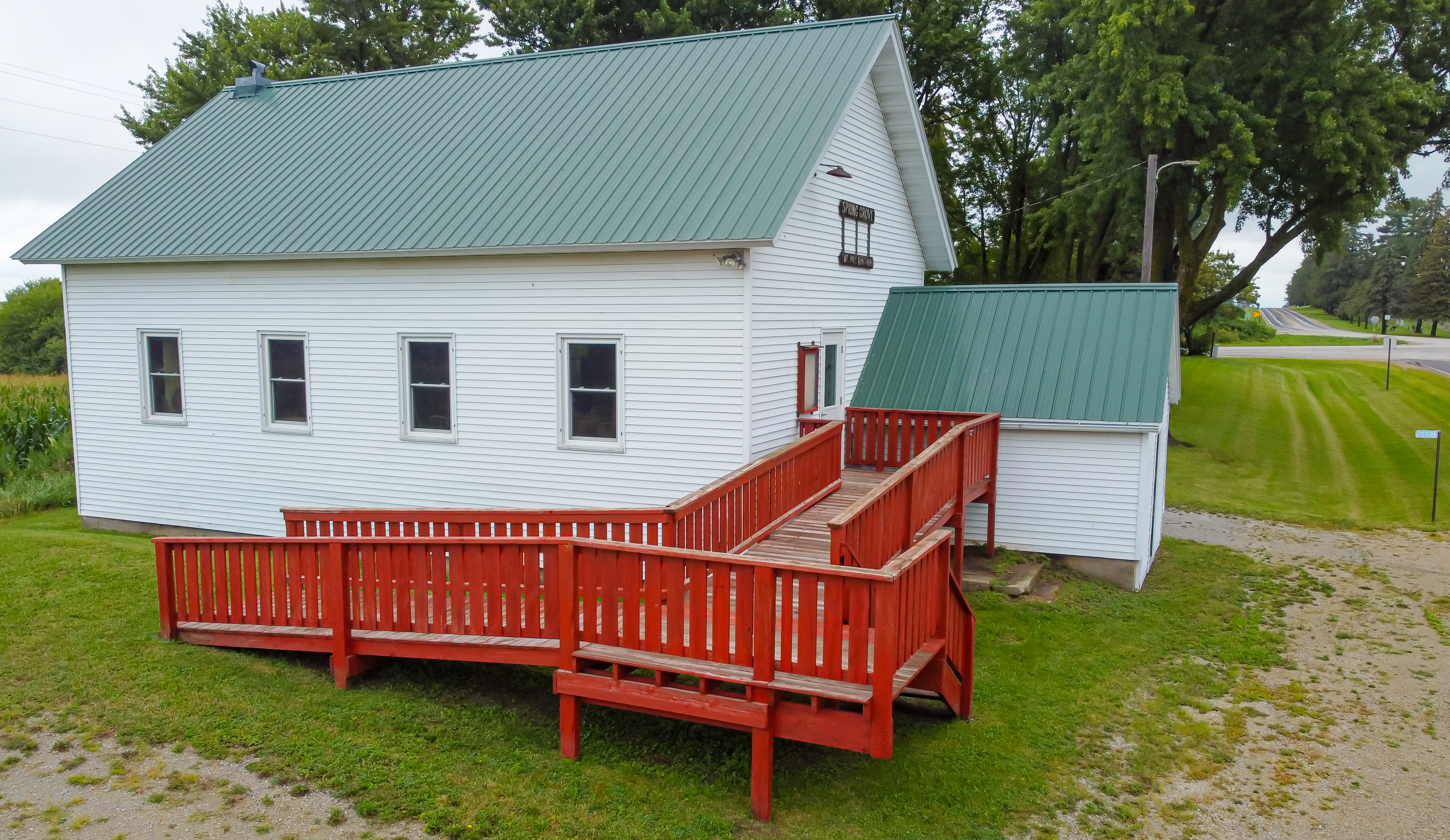
- Town hall

- Location within the state of Minnesota Spring Grove Township, Minnesota (the United States)
- Coordinates: 43°33′30″N 91°41′20″W
- Country: United States
- State: Minnesota
- County: Houston

Area
  - Total: 35.0 sq mi (90.7 km^{2})
  - Land: 35.0 sq mi (90.7 km^{2})
  - Water: 0 sq mi (0.0 km^{2})
- Elevation: 1,227 ft (374 m)

Population (2000)
  - Total: 422
  - Density: 12/sq mi (4.7/km^{2})
- Time zone: UTC-6 (Central (CST))
  - Summer (DST): UTC-5 (CDT)
- ZIP code: 55974
- Area code: 507
- FIPS code: 27-61870
- GNIS feature ID: 0665673

Spring Grove Township is a township in Houston County, Minnesota, United States. The population was 422 at the 2000 census.

== History ==
Spring Grove Township was organized in 1858, and named after the community of Spring Grove.

== Geography ==
According to the United States Census Bureau, the township has a total area of 35.0 square miles (90.7 km^{2}), all land.

== Demographics ==
As of the census of 2000, there were 422 people, 156 households, and 114 families residing in the township. The population density was 12.1 people per square mile (4.7/km^{2}). There were 167 housing units at an average density of 4.8/sq mi (1.8/km^{2}). The racial makeup of the township was 99.29% White and 0.71% Asian. Hispanic or Latino of any race were 0.24% of the population.

There were 156 households, out of which 30.8% had children under the age of 18 living with them, 65.4% were married couples living together, 3.8% had a female householder with no husband present, and 26.9% were non-families. 24.4% of all households were made up of individuals, and 12.8% had someone living alone who was 65 years of age or older. The average household size was 2.71 and the average family size was 3.25.

In the township the population was spread out, with 25.6% under the age of 18, 10.7% from 18 to 24, 20.9% from 25 to 44, 29.1% from 45 to 64, and 13.7% who were 65 years of age or older. The median age was 40 years. For every 100 females, there were 114.2 males. For every 100 females age 18 and over, there were 119.6 males.

The median income for a household in the township was $37,639, and the median income for a family was $39,583. Males had a median income of $27,500 versus $17,212 for females. The per capita income for the township was $21,505. About 2.1% of families and 5.3% of the population were below the poverty line, including none of those under age 18 and 20.8% of those age 65 or over.
