= Jefferson, Minnesota =

Unincorporated community in Minnesota, United States

Jefferson
- Unincorporated community
- Location within Minnesota Location within the United States
- Coordinates: 43°30′51″N 91°16′49″W
- Country: United States
- State: Minnesota
- County: Houston
- Elevation: 659 ft (201 m)
- Time zone: UTC-6 (Central (CST))
  - Summer (DST): UTC-5 (CDT)
- Area code: 507
- GNIS feature ID: 654638

Jefferson is an unincorporated community in Houston County, Minnesota.

The first settlement at Jefferson was made in 1847.

Jefferson Township has an area of 90.13 km^{2}.
