= River Junction, Minnesota =

Unincorporated community in Minnesota, United States

River Junction
- Unincorporated community
- Location within Minnesota Location within the United States
- Coordinates: 43°50′46″N 91°17′50″W
- Country: United States
- State: Minnesota
- County: Houston
- Elevation: 646 ft (197 m)
- Time zone: UTC-6 (Central (CST))
  - Summer (DST): UTC-5 (CDT)
- Area code: 507
- GNIS feature ID: 654906

River Junction is an unincorporated community in Houston County in the U.S. state of Minnesota, located immediately north of the city of La Crescent on the west bank of the Mississippi River. River Junction takes its name from a railroad station of the Milwaukee Road (now Canadian Pacific) railroad. That station was located at the junction of two railway lines; the main line from Chicago and Milwaukee to La Crosse and thence across the Mississippi River to River Junction and north along the west bank of the river to St. Paul, and the line running south along the west side of the river to Iowa and points south.
