= Hokah Township, Houston County, Minnesota =

Hokah Township, Minnesota
- Township
- Location within the state of Minnesota Hokah Township, Minnesota (the United States)
- Coordinates: 43°45′32″N 91°20′33″W
- Country: United States
- State: Minnesota
- County: Houston

Area
  - Total: 25.4 sq mi (65.9 km^{2})
  - Land: 23.8 sq mi (61.6 km^{2})
  - Water: 1.7 sq mi (4.3 km^{2})
- Elevation: 663 ft (202 m)

Population (2000)
  - Total: 545
  - Density: 23/sq mi (8.8/km^{2})
- Time zone: UTC-6 (Central (CST))
  - Summer (DST): UTC-5 (CDT)
- ZIP code: 55941
- Area code: 507
- FIPS code: 27-29528
- GNIS feature ID: 0664493

Hokah Township (/ˈhoʊkə/ HOH-kə) is a township in Houston County, Minnesota, United States. The population was 545 at the 2000 census. Hokah Township was organized in 1858, and given the Native American name of the Root River.

== Geography ==
According to the United States Census Bureau, the township has a total area of 25.4 square miles (66 km^{2}), of which 23.8 square miles (62 km^{2}) is land and 1.6 square miles (4.1 km^{2}) (6.49%) is water.

== Demographics ==
As of the census of 2000, there were 545 people, 189 households, and 157 families residing in the township. The population density was 22.9 inhabitants per square mile (8.8/km^{2}). There were 196 housing units at an average density of 8.2 per square mile (3.2/km^{2}). The racial makeup of the township was 98.90% White, 0.18% African American, 0.73% Native American, and 0.18% from two or more races. Hispanic or Latino of any race were 0.73% of the population.

There were 189 households, out of which 45.5% had children under the age of 18 living with them, 70.9% were married couples living together, 5.8% had a female householder with no husband present, and 16.9% were non-families. 14.3% of all households were made up of individuals, and 5.3% had someone living alone who was 65 years of age or older. The average household size was 2.88 and the average family size was 3.18.

In the township the population was spread out, with 31.2% under the age of 18, 5.5% from 18 to 24, 26.8% from 25 to 44, 28.8% from 45 to 64, and 7.7% who were 65 years of age or older. The median age was 39 years. For every 100 females, there were 101.1 males. For every 100 females age 18 and over, there were 104.9 males.

The median income for a household in the township was $53,375, and the median income for a family was $53,750. Males had a median income of $34,107 versus $22,361 for females. The per capita income for the township was $20,752. About 2.5% of families and 3.9% of the population were below the poverty line, including 2.9% of those under age 18 and 4.8% of those age 65 or over.
