= Houston County Courthouse and Jail =

- U.S. National Register of Historic Places
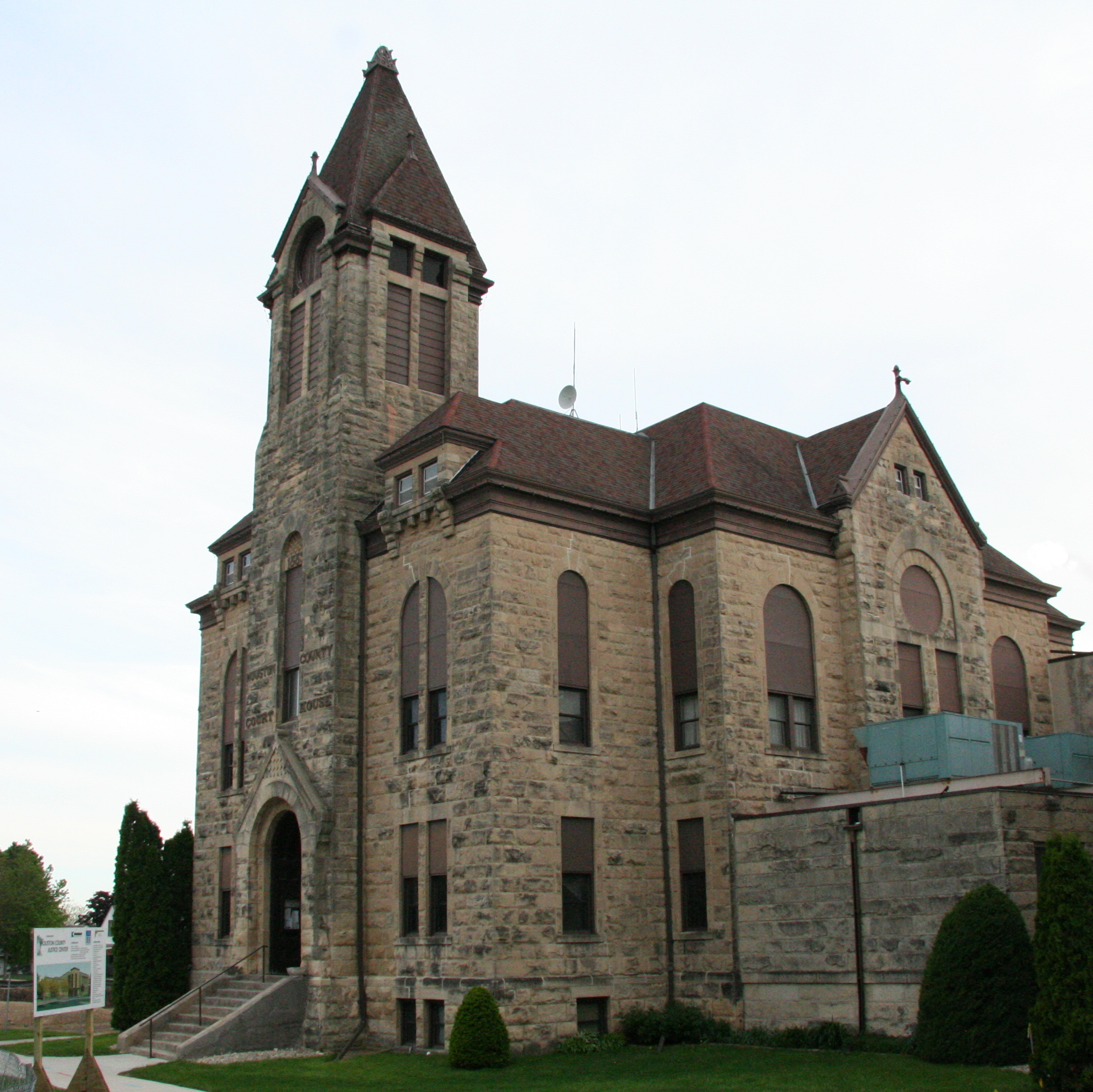

- Location within Minnesota Location within the United States
- Interactive map showing the location for Houston County Courthouse and Jail
- Location: Courthouse Sq., Caledonia, Minnesota
- Coordinates: 43°37′57″N 91°29′45.4″W
- Area: less than one acre
- Built: 1883
- Architect: C. G. Maybury & Son
- Architectural style: Italianate, Romanesque
- MPS: Houston County MRA
- NRHP reference No.: 83000905
- Added to NRHP: March 18, 1983

The Houston County Courthouse and Jail, located at 304 Marshall Street South in Caledonia, Houston County in the U.S. state of Minnesota, consists of a Romanesque stone courthouse featuring a prominent center tower, built in 1883 and an Italianate stone jail and sheriff residence built in 1875. Both were designed by C. G. Maybury & Son of Winona.

In the late nineteenth century there was considerable disagreement about the location of the Houston County seat. In 1874, Caledonia was named and construction soon began on the jail and sheriff's residence. By 1882 planning began on the courthouse. Construction was by Noonan and Stellwager at a cost of $60,000, and the building was completed in 1885. Taxpayers criticized the expense of ornamental carpentry and five chandeliers, while county taxes doubled. The current building includes additions built in 1965 and 1977.

In 2010, construction began on a new justice center next to the old courthouse; it will replace the old jail.

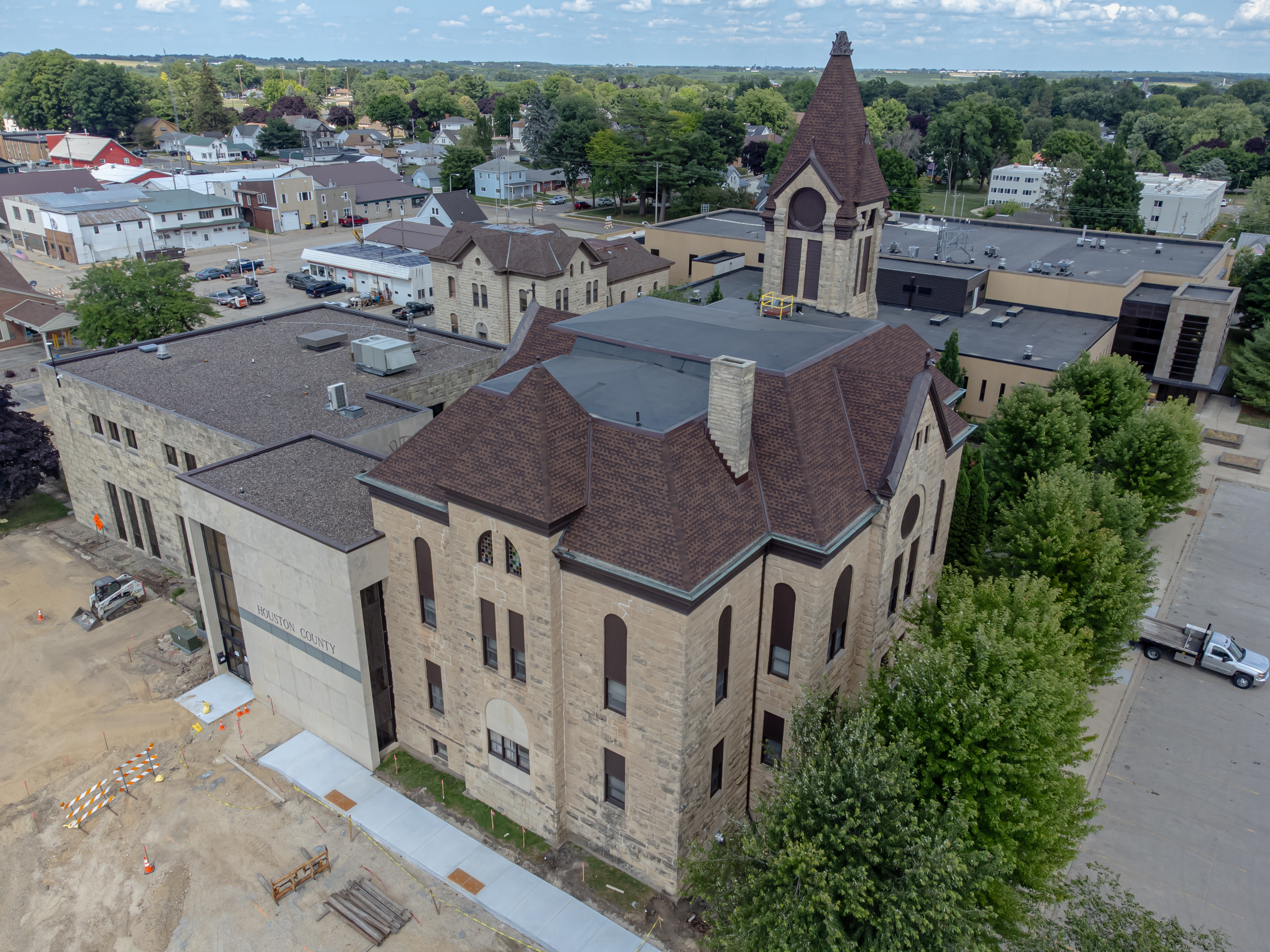
Houston County Courthouse
