= Jefferson Township, Houston County, Minnesota =

Jefferson Township
- Township
- Location within the state of Minnesota Jefferson Township (the United States)
- Coordinates: 43°31′48″N 91°16′51″W
- Country: United States
- State: Minnesota
- County: Houston

Area
  - Total: 34.8 sq mi (90.1 km^{2})
  - Land: 32.0 sq mi (82.9 km^{2})
  - Water: 2.8 sq mi (7.2 km^{2})
- Elevation: 1,037 ft (316 m)

Population (2000)
  - Total: 129
  - Density: 4.1/sq mi (1.6/km^{2})
- Time zone: UTC-6 (Central (CST))
  - Summer (DST): UTC-5 (CDT)
- FIPS code: 27-31814
- GNIS feature ID: 0664578

Jefferson Township is a township in Houston County, Minnesota, United States. The population was 129 at the 2000 census.

Jefferson Township was organized in 1858, and named after Jefferson County, New York, the native home of an early settler.

== Geography ==
According to the United States Census Bureau, the township has a total area of 34.8 square miles (90 km^{2}), of which 32.0 square miles (83 km^{2}) is land and 2.8 square miles (7.3 km^{2}) (8.04%) is water.

== Demographics ==
As of the census of 2000, there were 129 people, 46 households, and 35 families residing in the township. The population density was 4.0 inhabitants per square mile (1.5/km^{2}). There were 60 housing units at an average density of 1.9 per square mile (0.73/km^{2}). The racial makeup of the township was 100.00% White.

There were 46 households, out of which 30.4% had children under the age of 18 living with them, 69.6% were married couples living together, 2.2% had a female householder with no husband present, and 23.9% were non-families. 21.7% of all households were made up of individuals, and 6.5% had someone living alone who was 65 years of age or older. The average household size was 2.80 and the average family size was 3.34.

In the township the population was spread out, with 31.0% under the age of 18, 7.0% from 18 to 24, 25.6% from 25 to 44, 17.1% from 45 to 64, and 19.4% who were 65 years of age or older. The median age was 36 years. For every 100 females, there were 126.3 males. For every 100 females age 18 and over, there were 117.1 males.

The median income for a household in the township was $25,938, and the median income for a family was $38,750. Males had a median income of $23,750 versus $13,750 for females. The per capita income for the township was $12,247. There were 12.8% of families and 7.5% of the population living below the poverty line, including no under eighteens and 31.3% of those over 64.
