= Wilmington Township, Houston County, Minnesota =

Wilmington Township, Minnesota
- Township
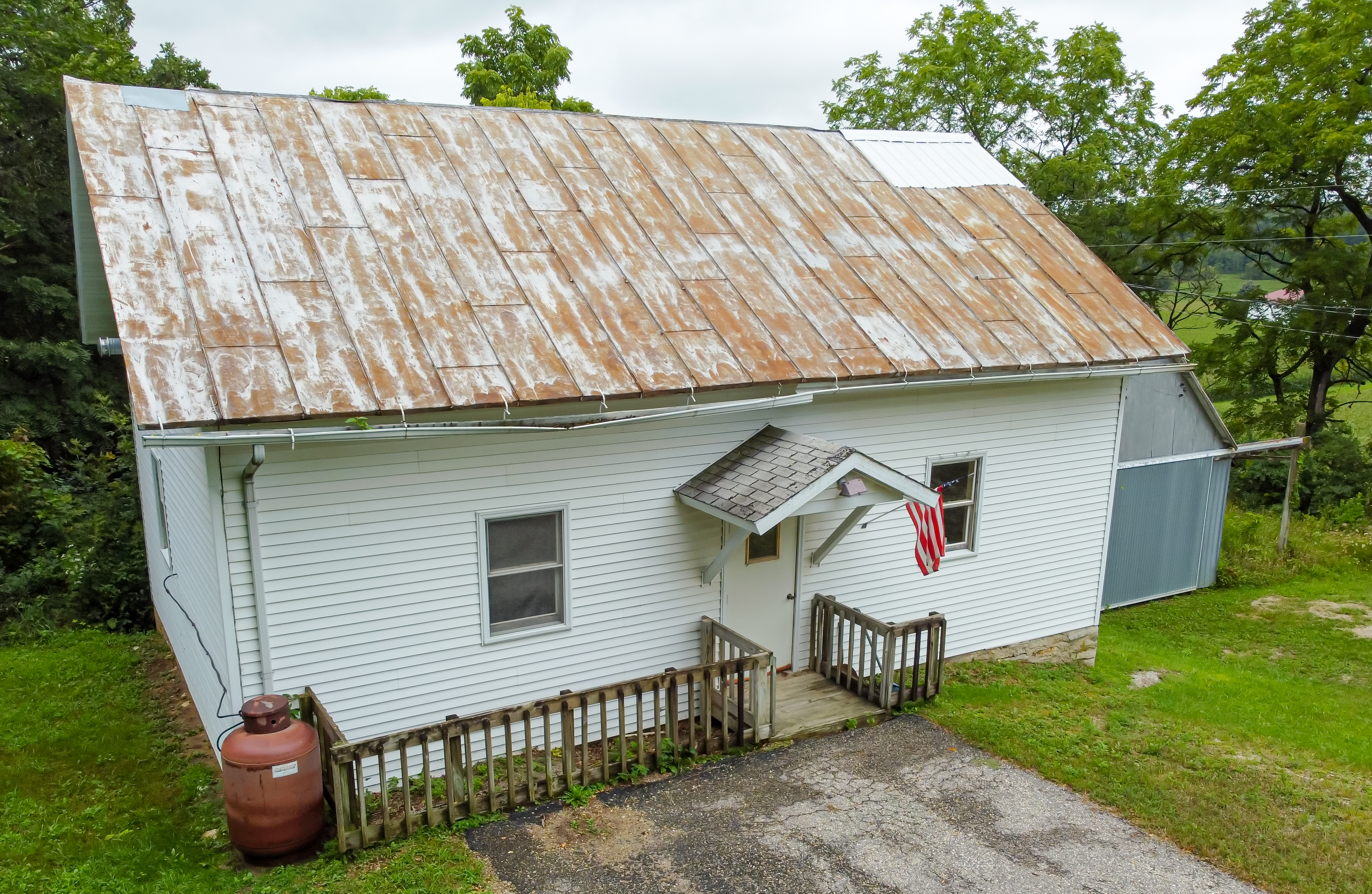
- Town hall

- Location within the state of Minnesota Wilmington Township, Minnesota (the United States)
- Coordinates: 43°33′1″N 91°32′6″W
- Country: United States
- State: Minnesota
- County: Houston

Area
  - Total: 36.0 sq mi (93.2 km^{2})
  - Land: 36.0 sq mi (93.2 km^{2})
  - Water: 0 sq mi (0.0 km^{2})
- Elevation: 1,125 ft (343 m)

Population (2000)
  - Total: 472
  - Density: 13/sq mi (5.1/km^{2})
- Time zone: UTC-6 (Central (CST))
  - Summer (DST): UTC-5 (CDT)
- FIPS code: 27-70564
- GNIS feature ID: 0666005

Wilmington Township is a township in Houston County, Minnesota, United States. The population was 472 at the 2000 census.

== History ==
Wilmington township was organized in 1858.

== Geography ==
According to the United States Census Bureau, the township has a total area of 36.0 square miles (93.2 km^{2}), all land.

== Demographics ==
As of the census of 2000, there were 472 people, 169 households, and 138 families residing in the township. The population density was 13.1 people per square mile (5.1/km^{2}). There were 179 housing units at an average density of 5.0/sq mi (1.9/km^{2}). The racial makeup of the township was 99.58% White and 0.42% African American. Hispanic or Latino of any race were 0.42% of the population.

There were 169 households, out of which 37.3% had children under the age of 18 living with them, 77.5% were married couples living together, 2.4% had a female householder with no husband present, and 18.3% were non-families. 15.4% of all households were made up of individuals, and 6.5% had someone living alone who was 65 years of age or older. The average household size was 2.79 and the average family size was 3.10.

In the township the population was spread out, with 29.0% under the age of 18, 4.7% from 18 to 24, 24.6% from 25 to 44, 27.8% from 45 to 64, and 14.0% who were 65 years of age or older. The median age was 41 years. For every 100 females, there were 108.8 males. For every 100 females age 18 and over, there were 105.5 males.

The median income for a household in the township was $38,214, and the median income for a family was $43,750. Males had a median income of $27,813 versus $16,625 for females. The per capita income for the township was $20,072. About 2.2% of families and 3.5% of the population were below the poverty line, including 2.6% of those under age 18 and 5.8% of those age 65 or over.
