= Caledonia, Minnesota =

City in Minnesota, United States

Caledonia
- City
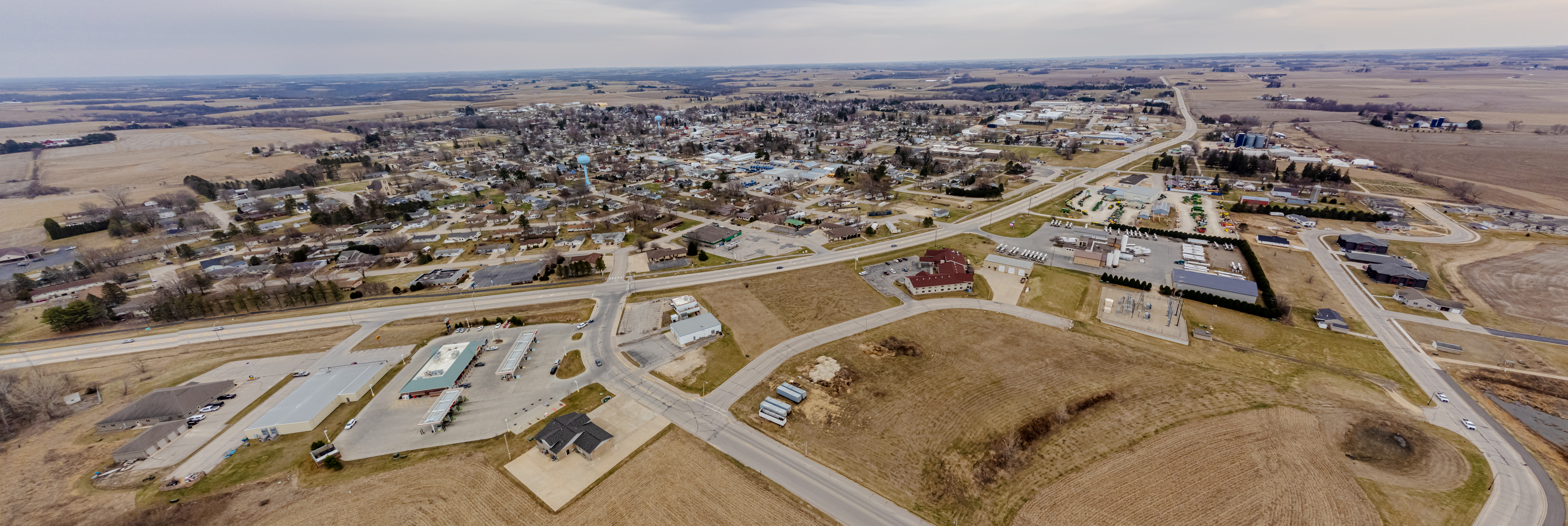
- Mottoes: "Wild Turkey Capital of Minnesota" and "The Heart of Quilt Country"
- Location of Caledonia within Houston County and state of Minnesota
- Coordinates: 43°37′59″N 91°29′47″W
- Country: United States
- State: Minnesota
- County: Houston
- Founded: 1854

Government
  - Mayor: Jeremy Leis

Area
  - Total: 2.83 sq mi (7.32 km^{2})
  - Land: 2.83 sq mi (7.32 km^{2})
  - Water: 0 sq mi (0.00 km^{2})
- Elevation: 1,155 ft (352 m)

Population (2020)
  - Total: 2,847
  - Density: 1,008.0/sq mi (389.18/km^{2})
- Time zone: UTC-6 (Central (CST))
  - Summer (DST): UTC-5 (CDT)
- ZIP code: 55921
- Area code: 507
- FIPS code: 27-09226
- GNIS feature ID: 2393493
- Website: City website

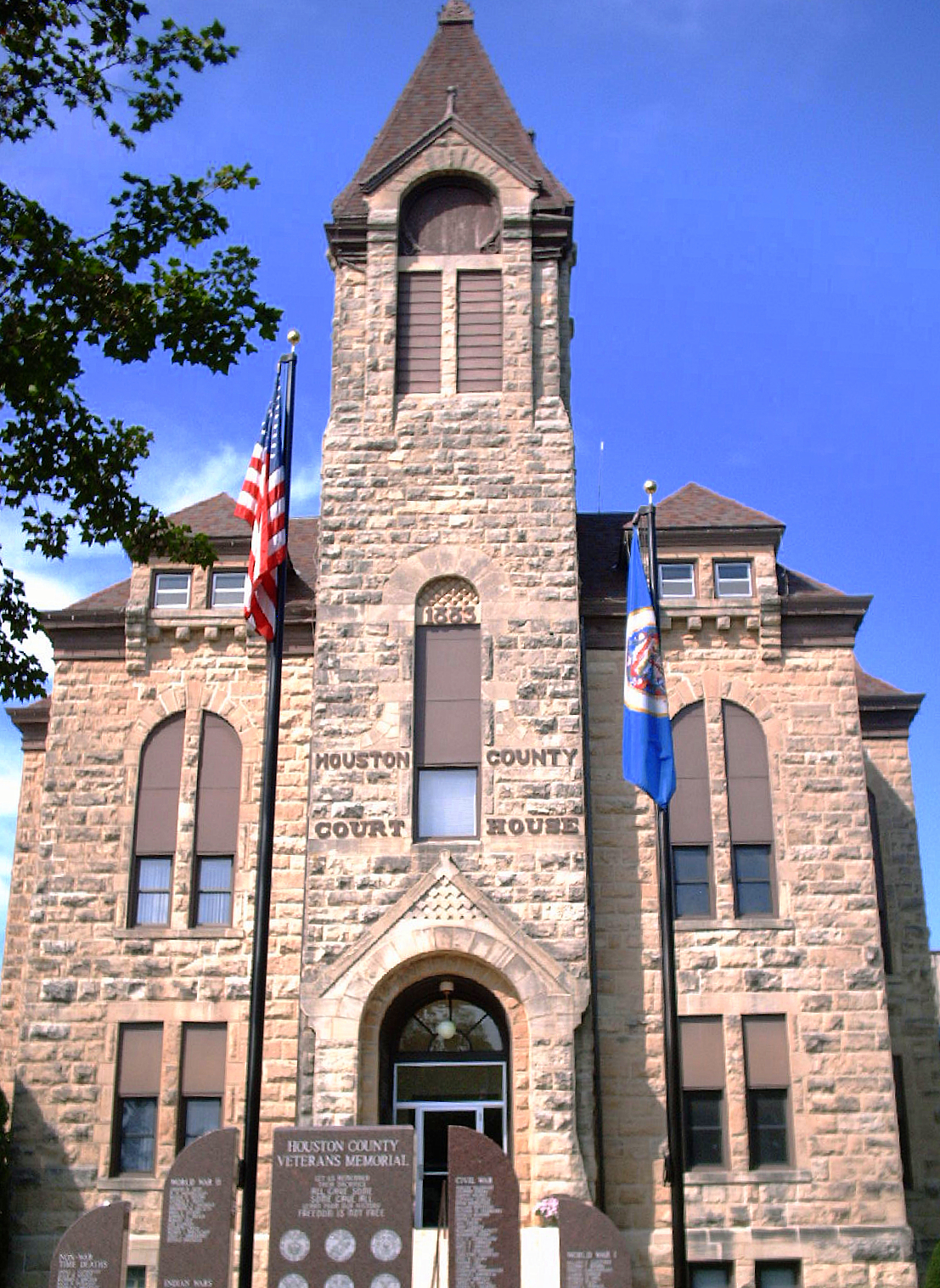
Houston County Courthouse in Caledonia

Caledonia is a city and the county seat of Houston County, Minnesota, United States and is part of the La Crosse, Wisconsin Metropolitan Statistical Area. The population was 2,847 at the 2020 census.

== History ==
Caledonia was platted in 1854–1855. The town was named by founder Colonel Samuel McPhail for the ancient Roman word for Scotland. A post office has been in operation at Caledonia since 1855. Caledonia was incorporated in 1870, and was reincorporated in 1889.

== Geography ==
According to the United States Census Bureau, the city has a total area of 2.84 square miles (7.36 km^{2}), all land. Caledonia is located 17 miles southwest of La Crosse, Wisconsin.

Minnesota Highway 44 and Minnesota Highway 76 are two of the main routes in the community.

=== Climate ===
Climate data for Caledonia, Minnesota, 1991–2020 normals, extremes 1893–present
Month	Jan	Feb	Mar	Apr	May	Jun	Jul	Aug	Sep	Oct	Nov	Dec	Year
Record high °F (°C)	58 (14)	68 (20)	82 (28)	93 (34)	93 (34)	97 (36)	104 (40)	102 (39)	96 (36)	91 (33)	75 (24)	66 (19)	104 (40)
Mean maximum °F (°C)	42.5 (5.8)	47.6 (8.7)	64.5 (18.1)	77.5 (25.3)	85.2 (29.6)	89.4 (31.9)	90.6 (32.6)	88.8 (31.6)	85.8 (29.9)	79.8 (26.6)	62.4 (16.9)	47.6 (8.7)	92.4 (33.6)
Mean daily maximum °F (°C)	24.4 (−4.2)	29.0 (−1.7)	41.3 (5.2)	55.7 (13.2)	67.8 (19.9)	77.3 (25.2)	81.2 (27.3)	79.1 (26.2)	72.1 (22.3)	58.7 (14.8)	42.7 (5.9)	29.8 (−1.2)	54.9 (12.7)
Daily mean °F (°C)	16.1 (−8.8)	20.1 (−6.6)	32.1 (0.1)	45.3 (7.4)	57.6 (14.2)	67.7 (19.8)	71.4 (21.9)	69.2 (20.7)	61.4 (16.3)	48.7 (9.3)	34.5 (1.4)	22.3 (−5.4)	45.5 (7.5)
Mean daily minimum °F (°C)	7.7 (−13.5)	11.3 (−11.5)	22.9 (−5.1)	35.0 (1.7)	47.4 (8.6)	58.0 (14.4)	61.7 (16.5)	59.3 (15.2)	50.7 (10.4)	38.6 (3.7)	26.4 (−3.1)	14.8 (−9.6)	36.2 (2.3)
Mean minimum °F (°C)	−15.3 (−26.3)	−11.7 (−24.3)	1.1 (−17.2)	20.8 (−6.2)	32.8 (0.4)	45.1 (7.3)	50.7 (10.4)	49.1 (9.5)	35.7 (2.1)	23.9 (−4.5)	9.0 (−12.8)	−8.8 (−22.7)	−19.1 (−28.4)
Record low °F (°C)	−37 (−38)	−35 (−37)	−32 (−36)	2 (−17)	19 (−7)	31 (−1)	41 (5)	35 (2)	20 (−7)	13 (−11)	−16 (−27)	−29 (−34)	−37 (−38)
Average precipitation inches (mm)	1.12 (28)	1.16 (29)	2.00 (51)	3.96 (101)	4.84 (123)	6.06 (154)	4.31 (109)	4.47 (114)	4.04 (103)	2.96 (75)	1.80 (46)	1.60 (41)	38.32 (974)
Average snowfall inches (cm)	10.4 (26)	10.6 (27)	7.4 (19)	3.2 (8.1)	0.0 (0.0)	0.0 (0.0)	0.0 (0.0)	0.0 (0.0)	0.0 (0.0)	0.3 (0.76)	2.8 (7.1)	10.1 (26)	44.8 (113.96)
Average extreme snow depth inches (cm)	9.2 (23)	9.4 (24)	7.3 (19)	1.4 (3.6)	0.0 (0.0)	0.0 (0.0)	0.0 (0.0)	0.0 (0.0)	0.0 (0.0)	0.1 (0.25)	1.4 (3.6)	6.2 (16)	13.1 (33)
Average precipitation days (≥ 0.01 in)	6.8	5.8	8.2	11.0	13.3	12.5	10.3	10.2	9.6	9.6	7.0	7.4	111.7
Average snowy days (≥ 0.1 in)	6.8	5.9	3.7	1.5	0.1	0.0	0.0	0.0	0.0	0.3	2.5	6.7	27.5
Source 1: NOAA
Source 2: National Weather Service

== Demographics ==
Historical population
Census	Pop.	Note	%±
1870	470		—
1880	894		90.2%
1890	927		3.7%
1900	1,175		26.8%
1910	1,372		16.8%
1920	1,570		14.4%
1930	1,554		−1.0%
1940	1,985		27.7%
1950	2,243		13.0%
1960	2,563		14.3%
1970	2,619		2.2%
1980	2,691		2.7%
1990	2,846		5.8%
2000	2,965		4.2%
2010	2,868		−3.3%
2020	2,847		−0.7%
U.S. Decennial Census

=== 2020 census ===
As of the 2020 census, Caledonia had a population of 2,847. The median age was 41.5 years. 23.1% of residents were under the age of 18 and 21.8% of residents were 65 years of age or older. For every 100 females there were 89.9 males, and for every 100 females age 18 and over there were 88.0 males age 18 and over.

0.0% of residents lived in urban areas, while 100.0% lived in rural areas.

There were 1,275 households in Caledonia, of which 24.6% had children under the age of 18 living in them. Of all households, 40.9% were married-couple households, 18.9% were households with a male householder and no spouse or partner present, and 32.3% were households with a female householder and no spouse or partner present. About 40.5% of all households were made up of individuals and 16.9% had someone living alone who was 65 years of age or older.

The population density was 1,008.1 inhabitants per square mile (389.2/km^{2}), and housing unit density was 483.7 per square mile (186.8/km^{2}). There were 1,366 housing units, of which 6.7% were vacant. The homeowner vacancy rate was 1.3% and the rental vacancy rate was 10.9%.

Racial composition as of the 2020 census
Race	Number	Percent
White	2,694	94.6%
Black or African American	33	1.2%
American Indian and Alaska Native	8	0.3%
Asian	12	0.4%
Native Hawaiian and Other Pacific Islander	0	0.0%
Some other race	4	0.1%
Two or more races	96	3.4%
Hispanic or Latino (of any race)	45	1.6%

=== 2010 census ===
As of the census of 2010, there were 2,868 people, 1,247 households, and 740 families living in the city. The population density was 1,009.9 inhabitants per square mile (389.9/km^{2}). There were 1,344 housing units at an average density of 473.2 per square mile (182.7/km^{2}). The racial makeup of the city was 96.8% White, 1.3% African American, 0.3% Native American, 0.7% Asian, 0.1% from other races, and 0.8% from two or more races. Hispanic or Latino of any race were 0.6% of the population.

There were 1,247 households, of which 27.4% had children under the age of 18 living with them, 43.5% were married couples living together, 11.5% had a female householder with no husband present, 4.4% had a male householder with no wife present, and 40.7% were non-families. 35.1% of all households were made up of individuals, and 16.4% had someone living alone who was 65 years of age or older. The average household size was 2.25 and the average family size was 2.91.

The median age in the city was 40.5 years. 22.7% of residents were under the age of 18; 9.4% were between the ages of 18 and 24; 23.3% were from 25 to 44; 24.2% were from 45 to 64; and 20.4% were 65 years of age or older. The gender makeup of the city was 48.9% male and 51.1% female.

=== 2000 census ===
As of the census of 2000, there were 2,965 people, 1,223 households, and 754 families living in the city. The population density was 1,037.1 inhabitants per square mile (400.4/km^{2}). There were 1,286 housing units at an average density of 449.8 per square mile (173.7/km^{2}). The racial makeup of the city was 98.35% White, 0.40% African American, 0.17% Native American, 0.30% Asian, 0.03% from other races, and 0.74% from two or more races. Hispanic or Latino of any race were 0.54% of the population.

There were 1,223 households, out of which 30.7% had children under the age of 18 living with them, 49.1% were married couples living together, 9.8% had a female householder with no husband present, and 38.3% were non-families. 34.2% of all households were made up of individuals, and 17.7% had someone living alone who was 65 years of age or older. The average household size was 2.31 and the average family size was 3.00.

In the city, the population was spread out, with 25.6% under the age of 18, 7.3% from 18 to 24, 24.6% from 25 to 44, 20.6% from 45 to 64, and 21.9% who were 65 years of age or older. The median age was 40 years. For every 100 females, there were 88.0 males. For every 100 females age 18 and over, there were 84.4 males.

The median income for a household in the city was $32,455, and the median income for a family was $45,679. Males had a median income of $30,302 versus $20,091 for females. The per capita income for the city was $16,953. About 5.2% of families and 8.7% of the population were below the poverty line, including 7.8% of those under age 18 and 12.1% of those age 65 or over.

== Education ==
Caledonia is home to Caledonia High School. St. Mary's Catholic School (K-8) and St. John's Lutheran School (Pre-K-8) are private schools.

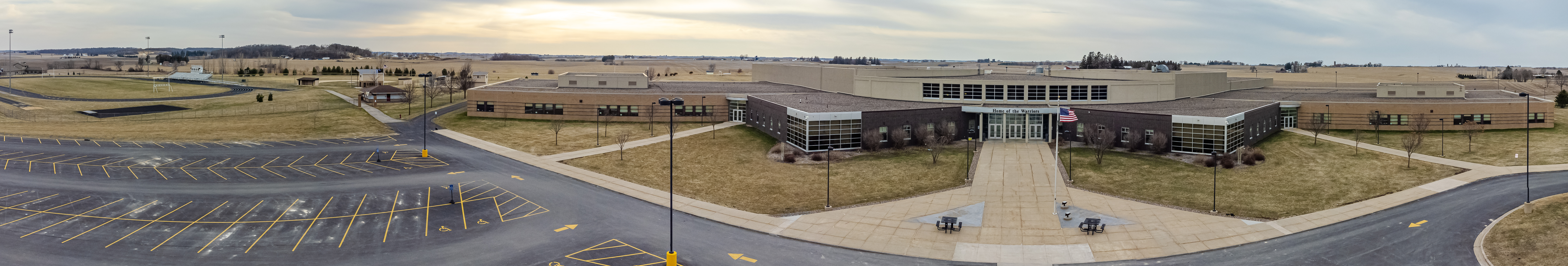
Caledonia High School

== See also ==
- Caledonia Public Library

== Notable people ==
- William F. Dunbar, first Minnesota state auditor.
- Isaac Fruechte, wide receiver for the Minnesota Vikings
- Karl Klug, defensive end for the Tennessee Titans
- Dave Kunst, first person to walk around the earth
- George Harold Lommen, Minnesota state legislator and lawyer
- Maurice J. McCauley, Minnesota state representative
- Ken Nelson, Country Music Hall of Fame inductee
- Samuel A. Rask, Minnesota state senator and businessman
- Al Sheehan, American entertainment businessman and radio host
