= Eitzen, Minnesota =

City in Minnesota, United States

Eitzen
- City
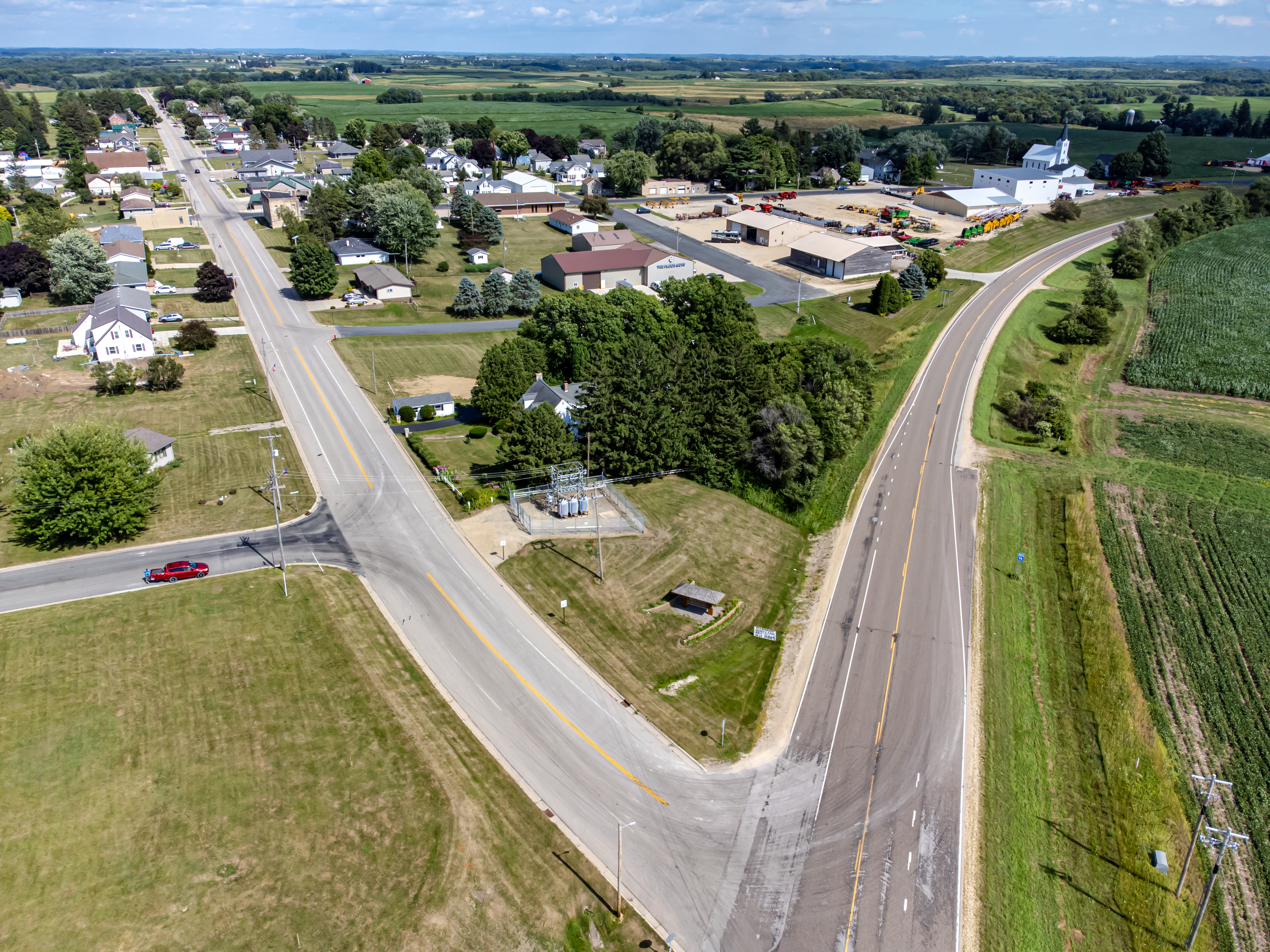
- Minnesota State Highway 76 and Main Street

- Location of Eitzen, Minnesota
- Coordinates: 43°30′29″N 91°27′49″W
- Country: United States
- State: Minnesota
- County: Houston

Area
  - Total: 0.61 sq mi (1.58 km^{2})
  - Land: 0.61 sq mi (1.58 km^{2})
  - Water: 0 sq mi (0.00 km^{2})
- Elevation: 1,165 ft (355 m)

Population (2020)
  - Total: 279
  - Density: 457.6/sq mi (176.69/km^{2})
- Time zone: UTC-6 (Central (CST))
  - Summer (DST): UTC-5 (CDT)
- ZIP code: 55931
- Area code: 507
- FIPS code: 27-18368
- GNIS feature ID: 2394630
- Website: www.eitzenmn.com

Eitzen is a city in Houston County, Minnesota, United States. As of the 2020 census, Eitzen had a population of 279.

== History ==
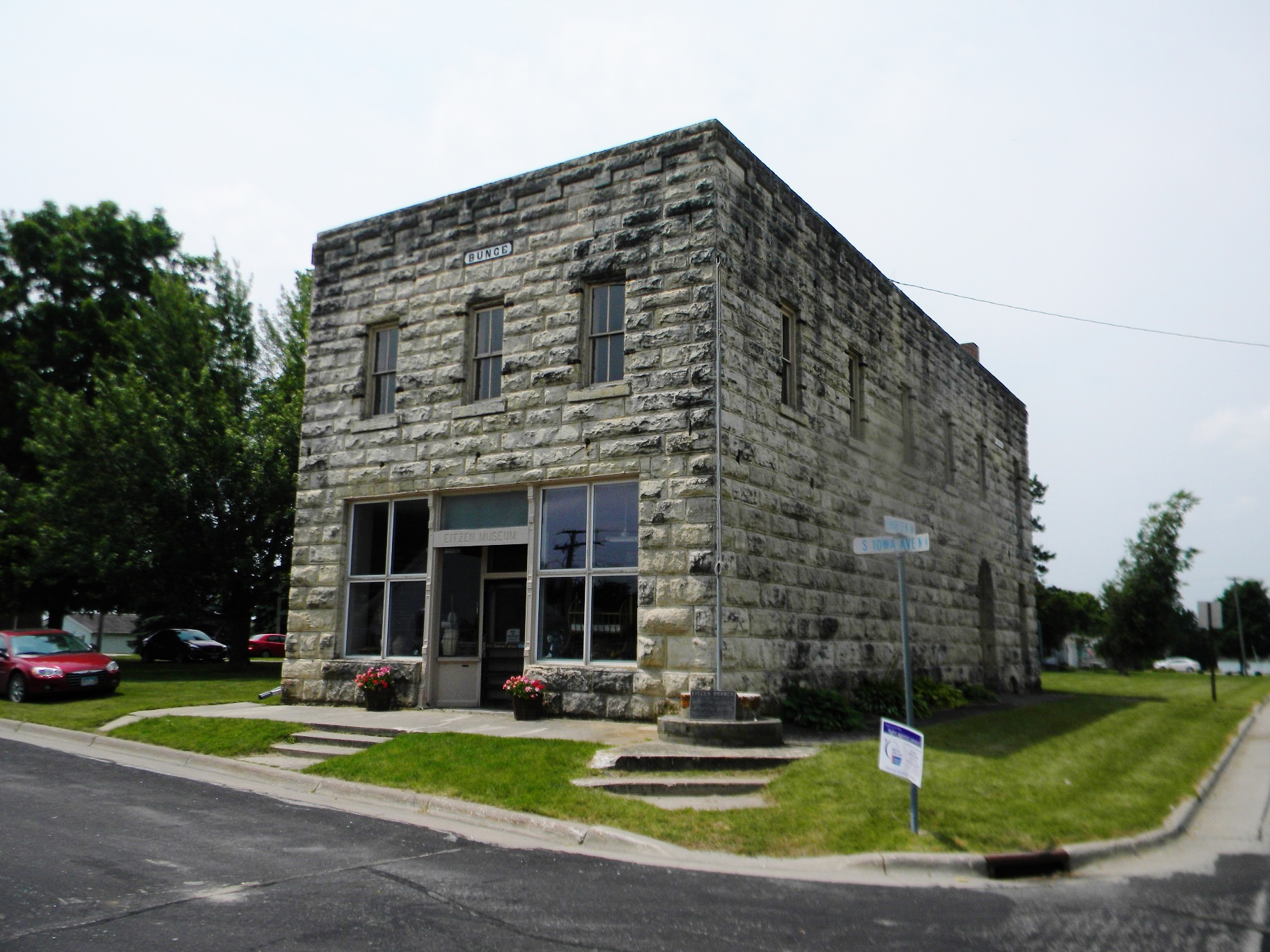
Eitzen Museum in the historic Bunge building

A post office called Eitzen has been in operation since 1868. A share of the early settlers being natives of Eitzen, Germany, caused the name to be selected.

In September 2020, while visiting randomly selected households in Eitzen, a group of CDC officials claimed to have been confronted, and to have had their cars surrounded, by residents of houses who did not believe they were who they claimed to be; the incident was one of several that led to the discontinuation of the program. This account was disputed by mayor Jeff Adamson, who claimed the city was never informed about the plan to approach random households, and said "I think they owe the city of Eitzen and its citizens an apology". He further said that "a city official and two other residents responded to concerns about people going door-to-door in an unmarked car with California plates [...] Two vehicles driven by the city official and residents were parked on either side of the COVID-19 team's vehicle, but it was never blocked."

== Geography ==
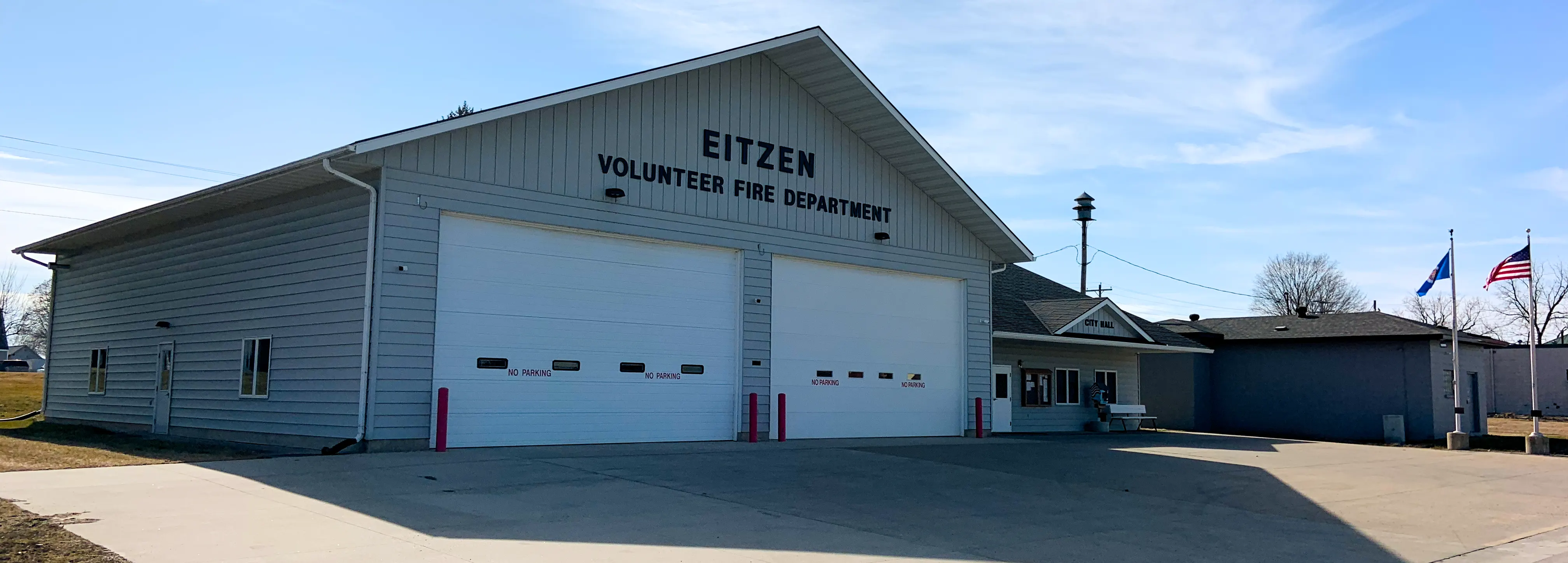
Eitzen, Minnesota city hall and fire department

According to the United States Census Bureau, the city has a total area of 0.58 square miles (1.50 km^{2}), all land.

== Demographics ==
Historical population
Census	Pop.	Note	%±
1950	151		—
1960	181		19.9%
1970	208		14.9%
1980	226		8.7%
1990	221		−2.2%
2000	229		3.6%
2010	243		6.1%
2020	279		14.8%
U.S. Decennial Census

=== 2010 census ===
As of the census of 2010, there were 243 people, 112 households, and 61 families living in the city. The population density was 419.0 inhabitants per square mile (161.8/km^{2}). There were 119 housing units at an average density of 205.2 per square mile (79.2/km^{2}). The racial makeup of the city was 100.0% White.

There were 112 households, of which 24.1% had children under the age of 18 living with them, 49.1% were married couples living together, 4.5% had a female householder with no husband present, 0.9% had a male householder with no wife present, and 45.5% were non-families. 33.0% of all households were made up of individuals, and 18.8% had someone living alone who was 65 years of age or older. The average household size was 2.17 and the average family size was 2.89.

The median age in the city was 44.5 years. 17.7% of residents were under the age of 18; 11% were between the ages of 18 and 24; 22.7% were from 25 to 44; 20.2% were from 45 to 64; and 28.4% were 65 years of age or older. The gender makeup of the city was 49.4% male and 50.6% female.

=== 2000 census ===
As of the census of 2000, there were 229 people, 108 households, and 60 families living in the city. The population density was 394.4 inhabitants per square mile (152.3/km^{2}). There were 111 housing units at an average density of 191.2 per square mile (73.8/km^{2}). The racial makeup of the city was 100.00% White.

There were 108 households, out of which 20.4% had children under the age of 18 living with them, 50.0% were married couples living together, 1.9% had a female householder with no husband present, and 44.4% were non-families. 39.8% of all households were made up of individuals, and 25.9% had someone living alone who was 65 years of age or older. The average household size was 2.12 and the average family size was 2.83.

In the city, the population was spread out, with 22.3% under the age of 18, 3.1% from 18 to 24, 26.6% from 25 to 44, 18.3% from 45 to 64, and 29.7% who were 65 years of age or older. The median age was 43 years. For every 100 females, there were 99.1 males. For every 100 females age 18 and over, there were 85.4 males.

The median income for a household in the city was $29,688, and the median income for a family was $36,607. Males had a median income of $26,250 versus $16,667 for females. The per capita income for the city was $16,440. About 3.0% of families and 3.5% of the population were below the poverty line, including none of those under the age of eighteen and 2.9% of those 65 or over.
