= Houston County, Minnesota =

County in Minnesota, United States

- County
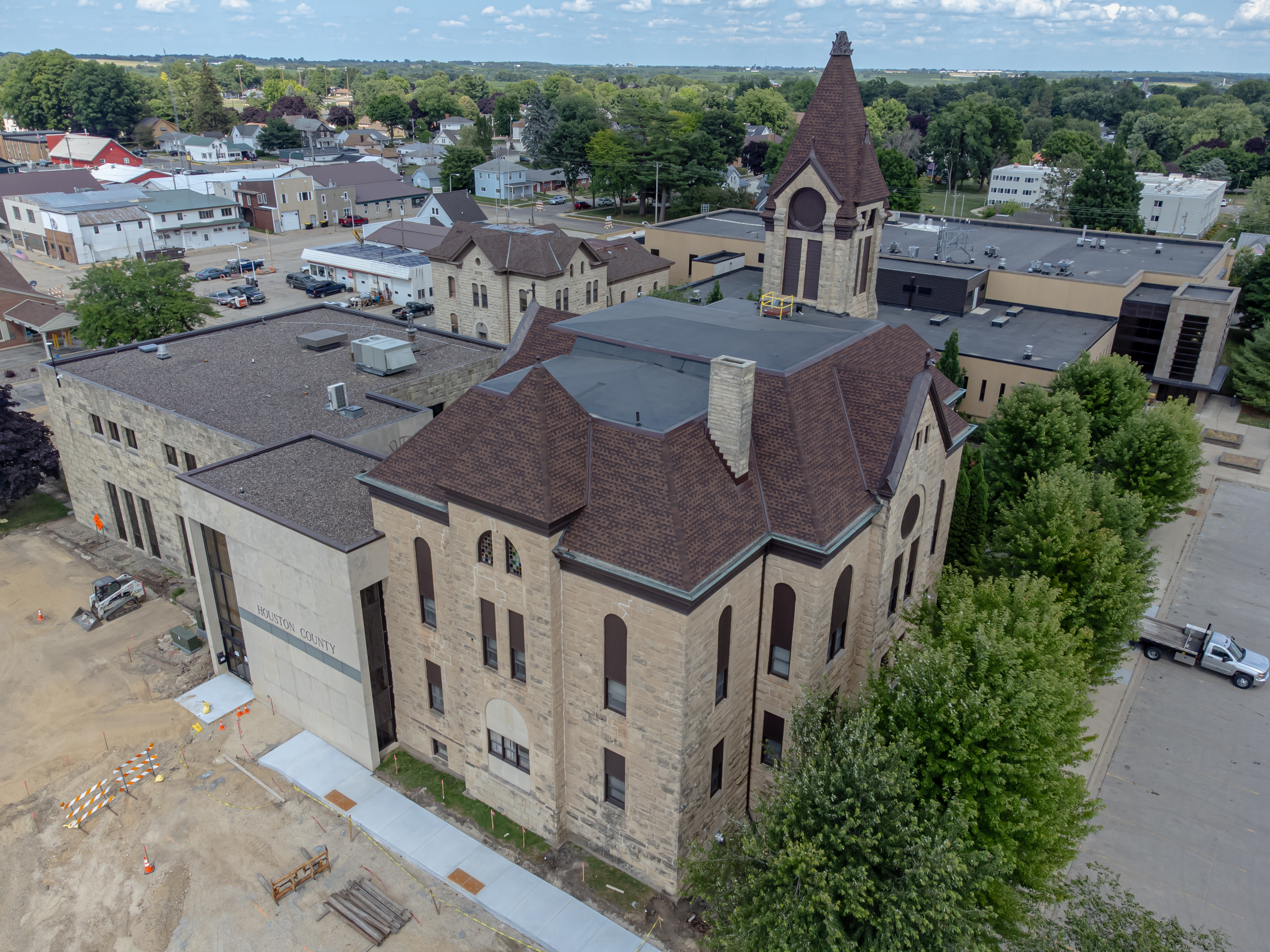
- Houston County Courthouse in Caledonia

- Location within the U.S. state of Minnesota
- Coordinates: 43°40′N 91°29′W
- Country: United States
- State: Minnesota
- Created: February 23, 1854
- Organized: April 4, 1854
- Named for: Sam Houston
- Seat: Caledonia
- Largest city: La Crescent

Area
  - Total: 569 sq mi (1,470 km^{2})
  - Land: 552 sq mi (1,430 km^{2})
  - Water: 17 sq mi (44 km^{2}) 2.9%

Population (2020)
  - Total: 18,843
  - Estimate (2025): 18,400 ▼
  - Density: 34.1/sq mi (13.2/km^{2})
- Time zone: UTC−6 (Central)
  - Summer (DST): UTC−5 (CDT)
- Congressional district: 1st
- Website: https://www.hocomn.gov/

Houston County (/ˈhjuːstən/ HEW-stən) is a county in the U.S. state of Minnesota. At the 2020 census, the population was 18,843. Its county seat is Caledonia. Houston County is included in the La Crosse–Onalaska Metropolitan Statistical Area.

== History ==
The area covered by today's Houston County was first organized as St. Croix County, of the Wisconsin Territory, in 1839. On October 27, 1849, part of that county was partitioned off to create Wabashaw County of the Minnesota Territory. On February 23, 1854, the territorial legislature authorized the partitioning of sections of Wabashaw to create Fillmore County and Houston County. An election on April 4, 1854, allowed the county government to be completed. The county was named for Sam Houston, who had been president of the Republic of Texas and a US senator from Texas. The village of Houston was the first county seat. Then a land speculator made an effort to move the seat to Caledonia, and in 1855 the county board moved the county records to Caledonia, which became the de facto seat, and eventually the legal seat after several county votes. In 1855 the records were stored in the cabin of Commissioner Samuel McPhail; the first court hearings were held in that cabin, and a one-story courthouse and jail was built in Caledonia in 1857. A two-story building was built in Caledonia in 1867, and several referendums made Caledonia the county seat by 1874. From that point on, Caledonia prospered and Houston slowly declined. The only other area of prominence was La Crescent, which benefited from its connection to La Crosse, Wisconsin.

== Geography ==
Houston County is at Minnesota's southeast corner. Its eastern border abuts Wisconsin (across the Mississippi River) and its southern border abuts Iowa. The Mississippi flows south-southeast along its eastern border. The Root River flows east through the northern part of the county, discharging into the Mississippi. Pine Creek flows east-southeast through the northeastern part of the county to discharge into the Mississippi, while Crooked Creek flows east across the southern part of the county to discharge into the Mississippi. The county's terrain consists of low rolling hills on its western end, transitioning to hills carved with drainages toward the east. The central and western portion of the county is a plateau with its highest point at 1,273 ft (388 m) ASL, near its southwest corner. The county has an area of 569 square miles (1,470 km^{2}), of which 552 square miles (1,430 km^{2}) is land and 17 square miles (44 km^{2}) (2.9%) is water.

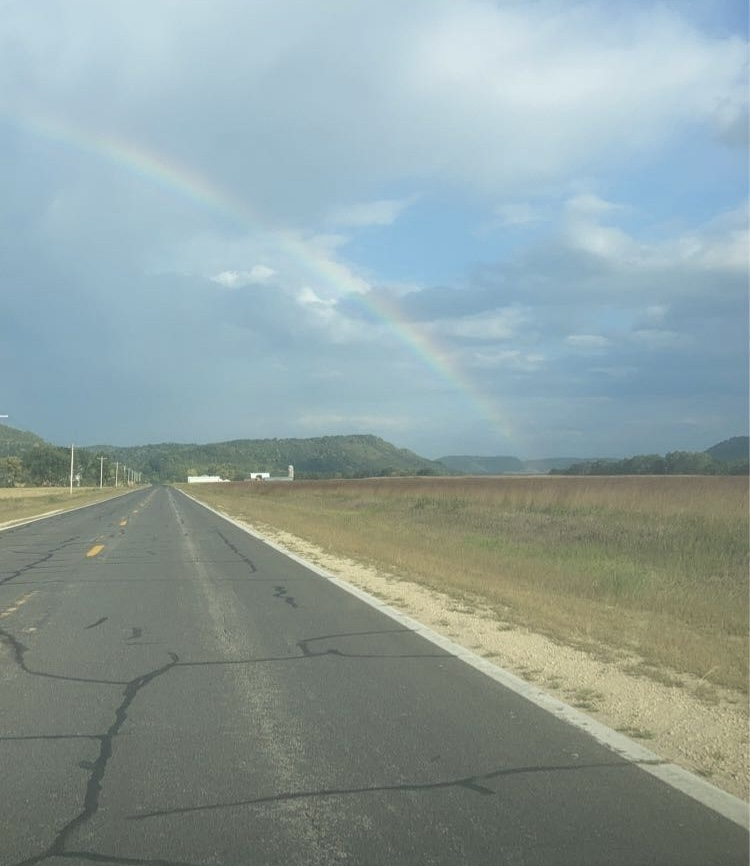
Driftless scenery in Houston County

The county is in the Driftless Zone, marked by the absence of glacial drift and presence of bedrock cut by streams into steep hills. The plateau that surrounds Caledonia includes flat, fertile farmland and hilly, verdant pasture land.

Soils of Houston County

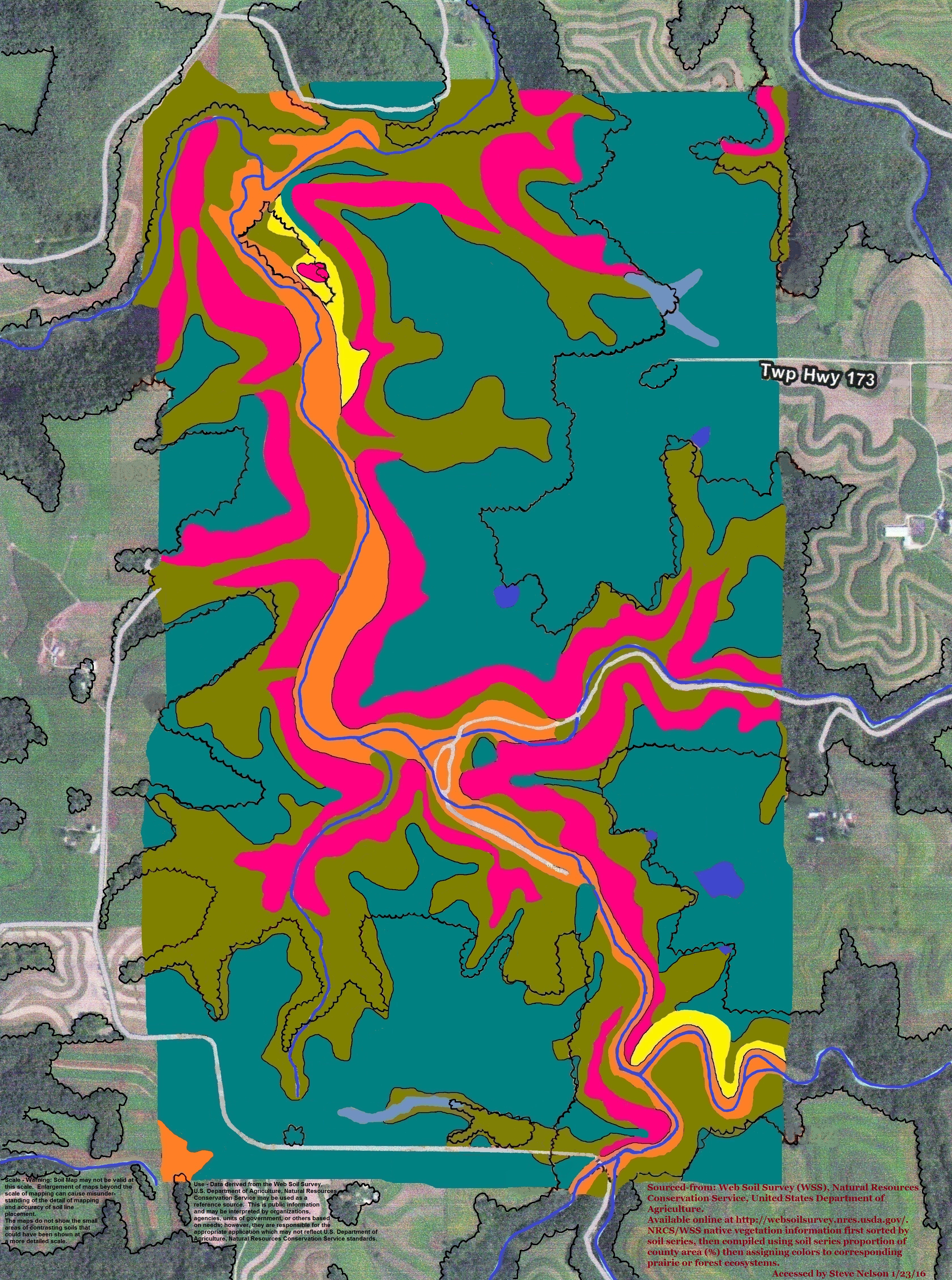
Soils of Beaver Creek Valley State Park neighborhood

=== Lakes ===
The Upper Mississippi River National Wildlife and Fish Refuge runs along the county's eastern border. Four lakes in the refuge fall within the county:

- Blue Lake
- Hayshore Lake
- Lawrence Lake
- Target Lake

=== Adjacent counties ===
- Winona County - north
- La Crosse County, Wisconsin - northeast
- Vernon County, Wisconsin - east
- Allamakee County, Iowa - south
- Winneshiek County, Iowa - southwest
- Fillmore County - west

=== Protected areas ===
- Beaver Creek Valley State Park
- Mound Prairie Scientific and Natural Area
- Upper Mississippi River National Wildlife and Fish Refuge (part)

== Demographics ==
Historical population
Census	Pop.	Note	%±
1860	6,645		—
1870	14,936		124.8%
1880	16,332		9.3%
1890	14,653		−10.3%
1900	15,400		5.1%
1910	14,297		−7.2%
1920	14,013		−2.0%
1930	13,845		−1.2%
1940	14,735		6.4%
1950	14,435		−2.0%
1960	16,588		14.9%
1970	17,556		5.8%
1980	18,382		4.7%
1990	18,497		0.6%
2000	19,718		6.6%
2010	19,027		−3.5%
2020	18,843		−1.0%
2025 (est.)	18,400	▼	−2.4%
U.S. Decennial Census; 1790–1960 1900–1990; 1990–2000 2010–2020

=== Racial and ethnic composition ===
Houston County, Minnesota – Racial and ethnic composition Note: the US Census treats Hispanic/Latino as an ethnic category. This table excludes Latinos from the racial categories and assigns them to a separate category. Hispanics/Latinos may be of any race.
Race / Ethnicity (NH = Non-Hispanic)	Pop 1980	Pop 1990	Pop 2000	Pop 2010	Pop 2020	% 1980	% 1990	% 2000	% 2010	% 2020
White alone (NH)	18,243	18,337	19,338	18,482	17,840	99.24%	99.13%	98.07%	97.14%	94.68%
Black or African American alone (NH)	8	24	58	98	90	0.04%	0.13%	0.29%	0.52%	0.48%
Native American or Alaska Native alone (NH)	26	48	32	31	42	0.14%	0.26%	0.16%	0.16%	0.22%
Asian alone (NH)	28	51	73	86	101	0.15%	0.28%	0.37%	0.45%	0.54%
Native Hawaiian or Pacific Islander alone (NH)	x	x	3	2	4	x	x	0.02%	0.01%	0.02%
Other race alone (NH)	31	0	4	5	31	0.17%	0.00%	0.02%	0.03%	0.16%
Mixed race or Multiracial (NH)	x	x	89	191	492	x	x	0.45%	1.00%	2.61%
Hispanic or Latino (any race)	46	37	121	132	243	0.25%	0.20%	0.61%	0.69%	1.29%
Total	18,382	18,497	19,718	19,027	18,843	100.00%	100.00%	100.00%	100.00%	100.00%

=== 2020 census ===
As of the 2020 census, the county had a population of 18,843. The median age was 44.9 years. 22.3% of residents were under the age of 18 and 22.6% of residents were 65 years of age or older. For every 100 females there were 99.2 males, and for every 100 females age 18 and over there were 96.8 males age 18 and over.

The racial makeup of the county was 95.0% White, 0.5% Black or African American, 0.3% American Indian and Alaska Native, 0.5% Asian, <0.1% Native Hawaiian and Pacific Islander, 0.5% from some other race, and 3.1% from two or more races. Hispanic or Latino residents of any race comprised 1.3% of the population.

29.0% of residents lived in urban areas, while 71.0% lived in rural areas.

There were 8,013 households in the county, of which 26.4% had children under the age of 18 living in them. Of all households, 52.6% were married-couple households, 17.8% were households with a male householder and no spouse or partner present, and 23.0% were households with a female householder and no spouse or partner present. About 30.4% of all households were made up of individuals and 15.1% had someone living alone who was 65 years of age or older.

There were 8,731 housing units, of which 8.2% were vacant. Among occupied housing units, 80.3% were owner-occupied and 19.7% were renter-occupied. The homeowner vacancy rate was 1.1% and the rental vacancy rate was 10.3%.

=== 2000 census ===
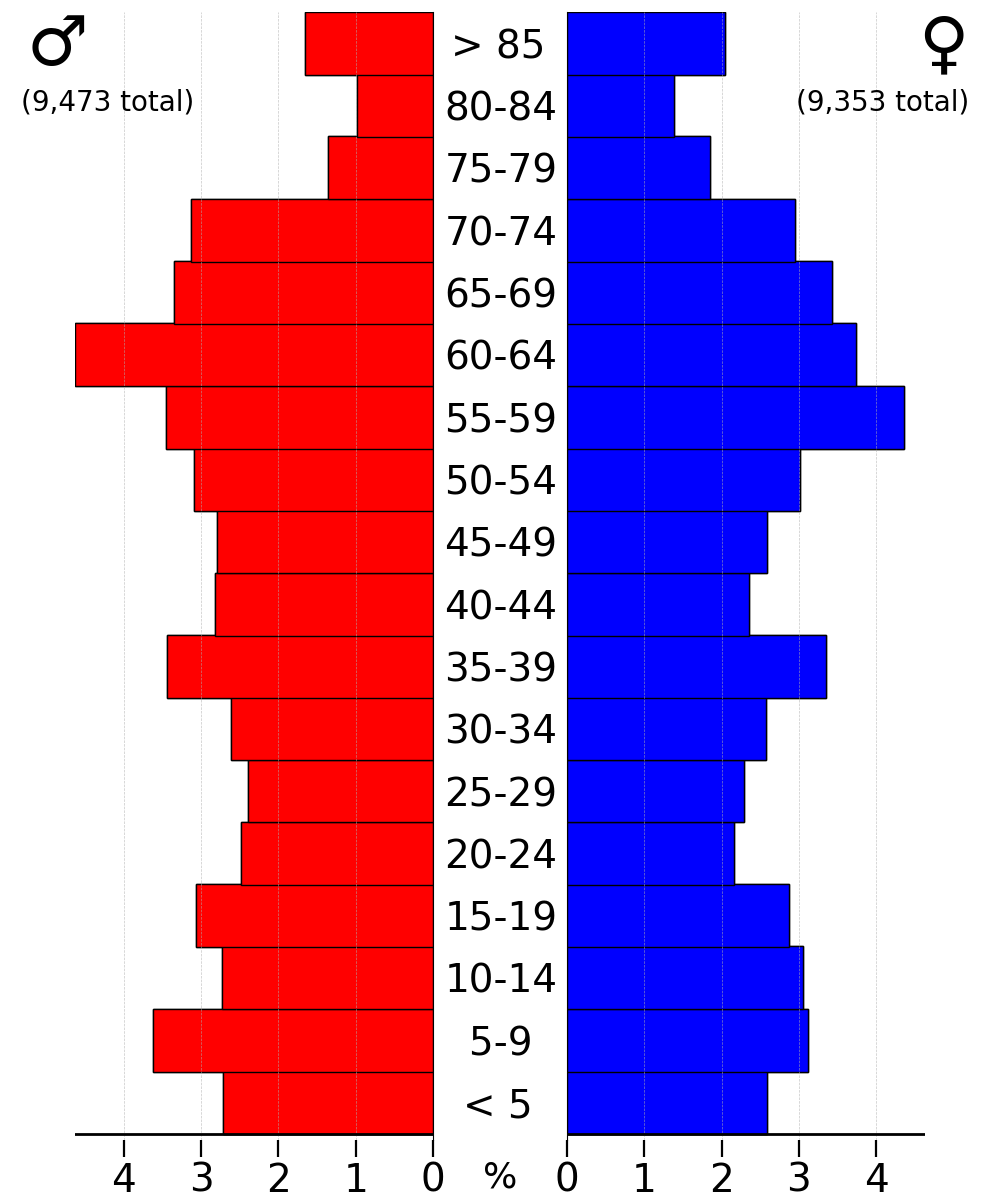
2022 US Census population pyramid for Houston County, from ACS 5-year estimates

As of the census of 2000, there were 19,718 people, 7,633 households and 5,411 families in the county. The population density was 35.7 per square mile (13.8/km^{2}). There were 8,168 housing units at an average density of 14.8 per square mile (5.7/km^{2}). The racial makeup of the county was 98.47% White, 0.31% Black or African American, 0.18% Native American, 0.37% Asian, 0.02% Pacific Islander, 0.14% from other races, and 0.51% from two or more races. 0.61% of the population were Hispanic or Latino of any race. 43.1% were of German, 29.6% Norwegian and 7.5% Irish ancestry.

There were 7,633 households, of which 34.4% had children under the age of 18 living with them, 60.0% were married couples living together, 7.4% had a female householder with no husband present, and 29.1% were non-families. 25.4% of all households were made up of individuals, and 12.0% had someone living alone who was 65 years of age or older. The average household size was 2.53 and the average family size was 3.05.

The county population contained 27.2% under the age of 18, 6.8% from 18 to 24, 26.8% from 25 to 44, 23.1% from 45 to 64, and 16.0% who were 65 years of age or older. The median age was 39 years. For every 100 females there were 97.5 males. For every 100 females age 18 and over, there were 95.1 males.

The median household income was $40,680 and the median family income was $49,196. Males had a median income of $32,557 and females $22,158. The per capita income was $18,826. About 4.2% of families and 6.5% of the population were below the poverty line, including 6.4% of those under age 18 and 11.2% of those age 65 or over.

== Transportation ==
=== Transit ===
- La Crosse MTU

=== Major highways ===
- U.S. Highway 14
- U.S. Highway 61
- Minnesota State Highway 16
- Minnesota State Highway 26
- Minnesota State Highway 44
- Minnesota State Highway 76

=== Airport ===
- Houston County Airport

== Communities ==
=== Cities ===
- Brownsville
- Caledonia (county seat)
- Eitzen
- Hokah
- Houston
- La Crescent (partly in Winona County)
- Spring Grove

=== Unincorporated communities ===
- Bee
- Black Hammer
- Freeburg
- Jefferson
- Mayville
- Money Creek
- Newhouse
- Pine Creek (partial)
- Reno
- River Junction
- Willington Grove
- Wilmington
- Yucatan
- Sheldon

=== Townships ===
- Black Hammer Township
- Brownsville Township
- Caledonia Township
- Crooked Creek Township
- Hokah Township
- Houston Township
- Jefferson Township
- La Crescent Township
- Mayville Township
- Money Creek Township
- Mound Prairie Township
- Sheldon Township
- Spring Grove Township
- Union Township
- Wilmington Township
- Winnebago Township
- Yucatan Township

== Government and politics ==
Houston County voters have tended to vote Republican in the 21st century. As of 2024 the county had selected the Republican candidate in 75% of presidential elections since 1980.

United States presidential election results for Houston County, Minnesota
Year	Republican		Democratic		Third party(ies)	
Year	No.	%	No.	%	No.	%
1892	1,509	50.13%	1,243	41.30%	258	8.57%
1896	2,087	65.92%	991	31.30%	88	2.78%
1900	1,765	64.58%	884	32.35%	84	3.07%
1904	1,546	76.12%	434	21.37%	51	2.51%
1908	1,700	67.35%	745	29.52%	79	3.13%
1912	659	23.75%	762	27.46%	1,354	48.79%
1916	1,783	69.08%	744	28.83%	54	2.09%
1920	4,101	85.67%	598	12.49%	88	1.84%
1924	2,782	53.58%	402	7.74%	2,008	38.67%
1928	3,615	64.87%	1,937	34.76%	21	0.38%
1932	2,335	42.63%	3,052	55.71%	91	1.66%
1936	2,701	44.28%	3,156	51.74%	243	3.98%
1940	4,825	69.48%	2,082	29.98%	37	0.53%
1944	4,036	68.31%	1,847	31.26%	25	0.42%
1948	3,540	56.81%	2,623	42.10%	68	1.09%
1952	5,365	74.28%	1,830	25.34%	28	0.39%
1956	4,538	67.93%	2,133	31.93%	9	0.13%
1960	4,807	60.93%	3,080	39.04%	3	0.04%
1964	3,433	46.86%	3,885	53.03%	8	0.11%
1968	4,450	57.94%	2,703	35.19%	528	6.87%
1972	5,186	66.57%	2,467	31.67%	137	1.76%
1976	4,853	54.37%	3,861	43.26%	212	2.38%
1980	5,582	58.88%	3,218	33.94%	681	7.18%
1984	5,645	61.06%	3,512	37.99%	88	0.95%
1988	4,777	54.13%	3,936	44.60%	112	1.27%
1992	3,853	36.87%	3,744	35.82%	2,854	27.31%
1996	3,674	38.88%	4,153	43.95%	1,623	17.17%
2000	5,077	49.94%	4,502	44.28%	588	5.78%
2004	5,631	50.81%	5,276	47.61%	175	1.58%
2008	4,743	43.58%	5,906	54.27%	234	2.15%
2012	4,951	47.40%	5,281	50.56%	214	2.05%
2016	5,616	52.96%	4,145	39.09%	843	7.95%
2020	6,334	55.37%	4,853	42.42%	253	2.21%
2024	6,547	57.29%	4,667	40.84%	214	1.87%

County Board of Commissioners
Position	Name	District	Next election
Commissioner	Dewey Severson	1	2024
Commissioner	Eric Johnson	2	2026
Commissioner	Bob Burns	3	2024
Commissioner	Bob Schuldt	4	2026
Commissioner	Greg Myhre	5	2024

State Legislature (2025–2027)
Position	Name	Affiliation	District
Senate	Jeremy Miller	Republican	District 26
House of Representatives	Greg Davids	Republican	District 26B

U.S Congress (2025–2027)
Position	Name	Affiliation	District
House of Representatives	Brad Finstad	Republican	1st
Senate	Amy Klobuchar	Democrat	N/A
Senate	Tina Smith	Democrat	N/A

== Education ==
School districts include:

- Caledonia Public School District
- Houston Public Schools
- La Crescent-Hokah School District
- Mabel-Canton Public Schools
- Rushford-Peterson Public Schools
- Spring Grove School District

== See also ==
- National Register of Historic Places listings in Houston County, Minnesota
- Upper Mississippi River National Wildlife and Fish Refuge
