= List of county roads in Houston County, Minnesota =

Highway names
- Interstates: Interstate X (I-X)
- US Highways: U.S. Highway X (US X)
- State: Trunk Highway X (MN X or TH X)
- County State-Aid Highways: County State-Aid Highway X (CSAH X)
- County Roads: County Road X (CR X)

System links
- County roads of Minnesota; Houston County

The following is a list of county-maintained roads in Houston County, Minnesota, United States. Some of the routes included in this list are also county-state-aid-highways (CSAH.)

== Route list ==
| Number | Length (mi) | Length (km) | Southern or western terminus | Northern or eastern terminus | Local names | Formed | Removed | Notes |
|---|---|---|---|---|---|---|---|---|
| CSAH 1 | 3.69 | 5.94 | Beaver Creek Valley State Park entrance in Caledonia Township | MN 76 in Caledonia | | — | — | |
| CSAH 2 | 3.41 | 5.49 | MN 76 in Eitzen | Iowa state line (County A11) | | — | — | Western Segment |
| CSAH 2 | 4.47 | 7.19 | Iowa state line (County A11) | Iowa state line (County A11) | | — | — | Eastern Segment |
| CSAH 3 | 14.16 | 22.79 | MN 44 and MN 76 in Caledonia | MN 26 in Brownsville | | — | — | |
| CSAH 4 | 23.7 | 38.1 | Iowa state line (128th Avenue) | MN 76 in Sheldon Township | | — | — | |
| CSAH 5 | 17.11 | 27.54 | Iowa state line (Winnebago Road) | CSAH 3 in Caledonia | | — | — | |
| CSAH 6 | 8.6 | 13.8 | Winona County line (County 5) | US 14, US 61, and MN 16 in La Crescent | | — | — | |
| CSAH 7 | 2.71 | 4.36 | MN 16 in Hokah | MN 26 in Hokah Township | | — | — | |
| CSAH 8 | 4.47 | 7.19 | Iowa state line (County W38) | Fillmore County line (County 29) | | — | — | Southern Segment |
| CSAH 8 | 3.83 | 6.16 | Fillmore County line (County 29) | Fillmore County line (County 29) | | — | — | Northern Segment |
| CSAH 9 | 7.11 | 11.44 | MN 76 in Houston Township | Winona County line (County 11) | | — | — | |
| CSAH 10 | 9.85 | 15.85 | MN 76 in Sheldon Township | MN 76 in Sheldon Township | | — | — | |
| CSAH 11 | 6.15 | 9.90 | CSAH 4 in Black Hammer Township | CSAH 10 in Sheldon Township | | — | — | |
| CSAH 12 | 9.05 | 14.56 | CSAH 11 in Black Hammer Township | MN 44 and MN 76 in Caledonia | | — | — | |
| CSAH 13 | 10.13 | 16.30 | Fillmore County line (County 10) | MN 16 and MN 76 in Houston | | — | — | |
| CSAH 14 | 11.82 | 19.02 | CSAH 5 in Mayville Township | MN 26 in Jefferson Township | | — | — | |
| CSAH 15 | 3.24 | 5.21 | Fillmore County line (County 13) | CSAH 4 in Yucatan Township | | — | — | |
| CSAH 16 | 4.69 | 7.55 | Iowa state line (County A16) | MN 44 in Spring Grove | | — | — | |
| CSAH 17 | 6.66 | 10.72 | MN 44 in Wilmington Township | MN 76 in Wilmington Township | | — | — | |
| CSAH 18 | 7.3 | 11.7 | CSAH 3 in Brownsville | MN 44 in Hokah | | — | — | |
| CSAH 19 | 3.95 | 6.36 | Fillmore County line (County 18) | CSAH 4 in Black Hammer Township | | — | — | |
| CSAH 20 | 10.59 | 17.04 | MN 76 in Sheldon Township | MN 44 in Union Township | | — | — | |
| CSAH 21 | 11.3 | 18.2 | CSAH 9 in Black Hammer Township | MN 16 in La Crescent Township | | — | — | |
| CSAH 22 | 7.65 | 12.31 | MN 76 in Sheldon Township | MN 16 in Houston Township | | — | — | |
| CSAH 23 | 4.01 | 6.45 | CSAH 2 in Eitzen | CSAH 5 in Winnebago Township | | — | — | |
| CSAH 24 | 4.79 | 7.71 | CR 249 in Crooked Creek Township | CSAH 3 in Brownsville Township | | — | — | |
| CSAH 25 | 12.44 | 20.02 | MN 16 in Mound Prairie Township | CSAH 6 in La Crescent | | — | — | |
| CSAH 26 | 10.02 | 16.13 | Fillmore County line (County 27) | Winona County line (County 13) | | — | — | |
| CSAH 27 | 9.48 | 15.26 | MN 44 in Spring Grove | MN 76 in Winnebago Township | | — | — | |
| CSAH 28 | 3.86 | 6.21 | CSAH 17 in Wilmington Township | MN 44 in Caledonia Township | | — | — | |
| CSAH 29 | 1.59 | 2.56 | CSAH 6 in La Crescent | Winona County line (County 1) | | — | — | |
| CSAH 30 | 0.14 | 0.23 | CSAH 6 in La Crescent Township | Winona County line (County 16) | | — | — | |
| CSAH 31 | 2.74 | 4.41 | CSAH 2 in Jefferson Township | CSAH 5 in Winnebago Township | | — | — | |
| CSAH 32 | 2.81 | 4.52 | CSAH 3 in MayvilleTownship | CR 249 in Mayville Township | | — | — | |
| CSAH 33 | 2.66 | 4.28 | CSAH 8 in Spring Grove Township | MN 44 in Spring Grove Township | | — | — | |
| CR 249 | 13.51 | 21.74 | CSAH 5 in Black Hammer Township | MN 26 in Crooked Creek Township | | — | — | |
