= La Crosse–Onalaska =

- Metropolitan Statistical Area
- La Crosse–Onalaska, WI–MN; Metropolitan Statistical Area
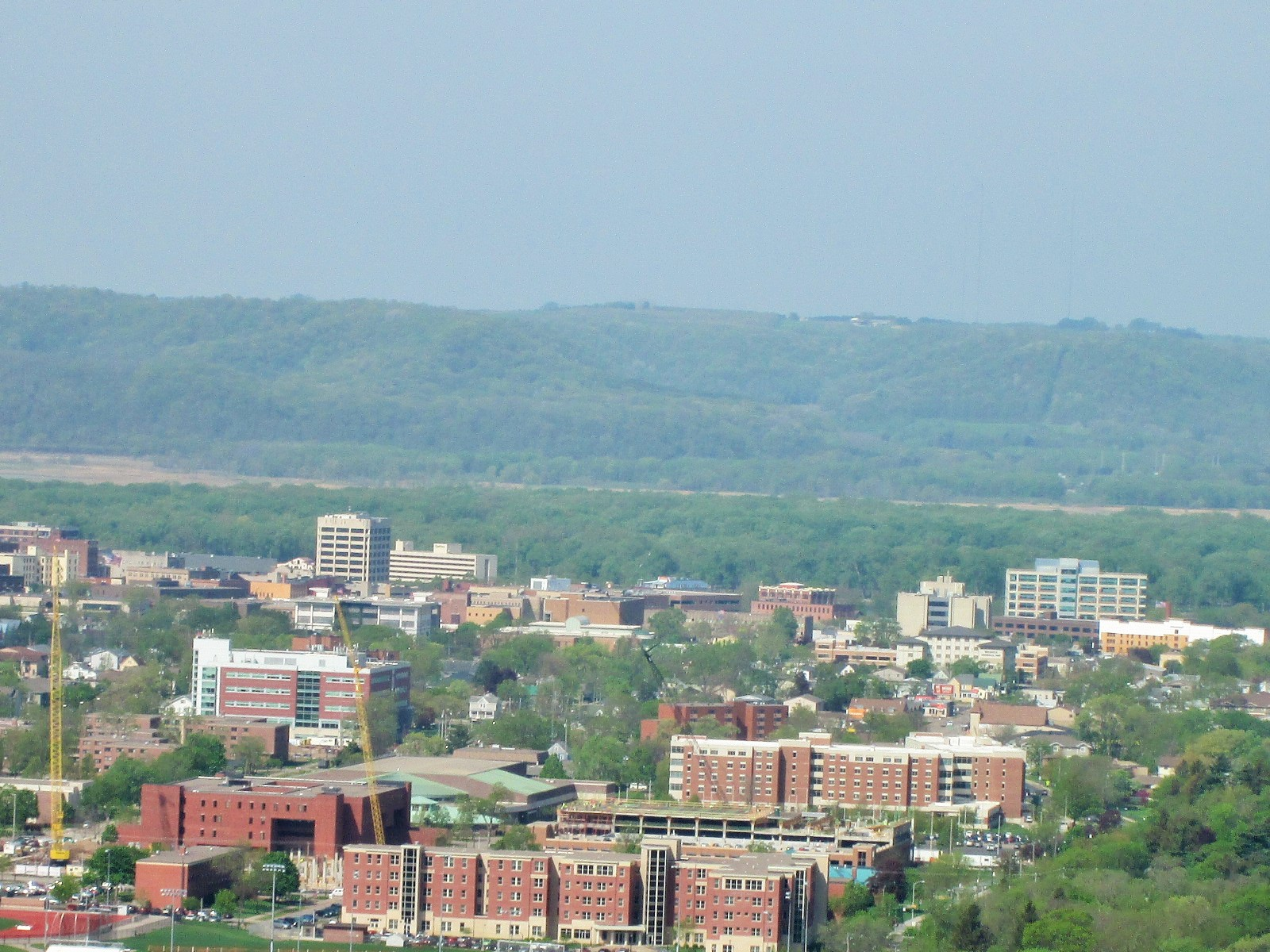
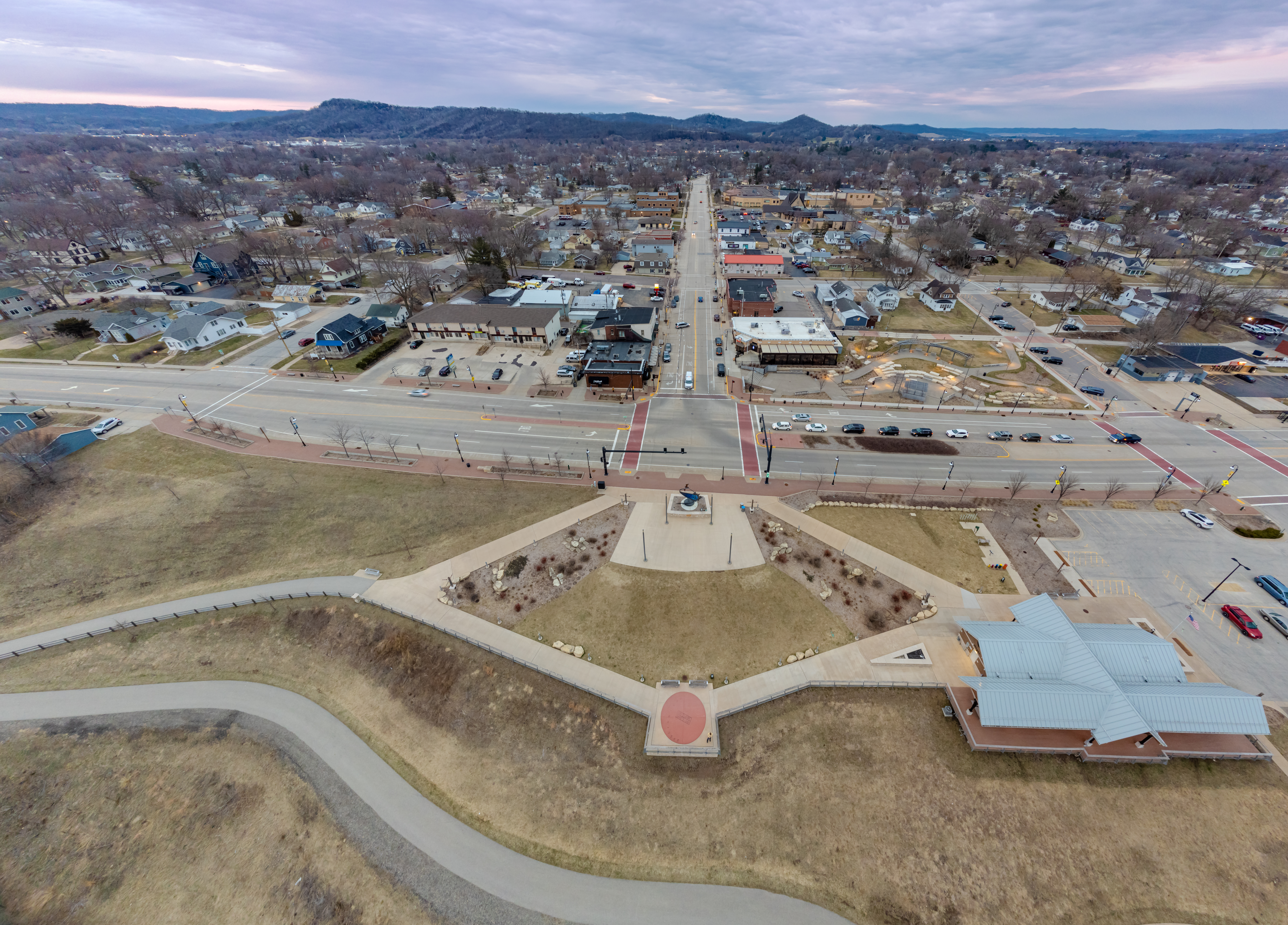
- La Crosse skyline Downtown Onalaska
Map of La Crosse–Onalaska–Sparta, WI–MN CSA
City of La Crosse
City of Onalaska
La Crosse–Onalaska, WI–MN MSA
Sparta, WI µSA
- Country: United States
- States: Wisconsin; Minnesota
- Largest city: La Crosse, WI
- Other cities: Onalaska, WI; Holmen, WI; La Crescent, MN; Sparta, WI

Area
  - Metropolitan Statistical Area: 1,003.8 sq mi (2,600 km^{2})
- Highest elevation: 1,410 ft (430 m)
- Lowest elevation: 627 ft (191 m)

Population (2020)
  - Urban: 98,872 (314th)
  - MSA: 170,341 (256th)
  - CSA: 216,389 (140th)
- Time zone: UTC-6 (CST)
  - Summer (DST): UTC-5 (CDT)
- Area codes: 608 and 507
- Public Transit: La Crosse MTU; SMRT
- Website: engagegreaterlacrosse.org

The La Crosse–Onalaska Metropolitan Statistical Area, as defined by the United States Census Bureau, is an area consisting of La Crosse County, Wisconsin, Vernon County, Wisconsin, and Houston County, Minnesota, anchored by the cities of La Crosse and Onalaska. The area is part of what is commonly referred to as the Coulee Region or 7 Rivers Region. As of the 2020 census, the MSA had a population of 170,341, and in 2023 estimates placed the total population at 170,238. The La Crosse–Onalaska-Sparta combined statistical area has a population of 216,389 as of 2023.

== Counties ==
- La Crosse County, Wisconsin
- Vernon County, Wisconsin
- Houston County, Minnesota

== Communities ==
=== Places with more than 50,000 inhabitants ===
- La Crosse, WI (Principal city)

=== Places with 5,000 to 20,000 inhabitants ===
- Holmen, WI
- La Crescent, MN
- Onalaska, WI
- West Salem, WI
- Sparta, WI

=== Places with 1,000 to 5,000 inhabitants ===
- Bangor, WI
- Caledonia, MN
- Hillsboro, WI
- Spring Grove, MN
- Viroqua, WI
- Westby, WI
- Holland, WI

=== Places with fewer than 1,000 inhabitants ===
- Brownsville, MN
- Chaseburg, WI
- Coon Valley, WI
- De Soto, WI
- Eitzen, MN
- Genoa, WI
- Hokah, MN
- Houston, MN
- La Farge, WI
- Ontario, WI
- Readstown, WI
- Rockland, WI
- Stoddard, WI
- Viola, WI

=== Unincorporated places ===
- Barre Mills, WI
- Burns, WI
- Campbell, WI
- Farmington, WI
- French Island, WI
- Greenfield, WI
- Hamilton, WI
- Holland, WI
- Medary, WI
- Mindoro, WI
- Shelby, WI
- Stevenstown, WI
- Washington, WI

== Population ==
Historical population
Census	Pop.	Note	%±
1860	29,838		—
1870	53,878		80.6%
1880	66,640		23.7%
1890	78,565		17.9%
1900	86,748		10.4%
1910	86,409		−0.4%
1920	87,620		1.4%
1930	96,837		10.5%
1940	104,328		7.7%
1950	109,928		5.4%
1960	114,716		4.4%
1970	122,581		6.9%
1980	135,080		10.2%
1990	142,018		5.1%
2000	154,894		9.1%
2010	163,438		5.5%
2020	170,341		4.2%
2023 (est.)	170,238		−0.1%
U.S. Decennial Census; 2020 Census

== Transportation ==
=== Highways ===
==== Interstate Highways ====
- Interstate 90

==== US Highways ====
- U.S. Route 14
- U.S. Highway 53
- U.S. Route 61

==== Minnesota State Highways ====
- Minnesota State Highway 16
- Minnesota State Highway 26
- Minnesota State Highway 44
- Minnesota State Highway 76

==== Wisconsin State Highways ====
- Highway 16 (Wisconsin)
- Highway 27 (Wisconsin)
- Highway 33 (Wisconsin)
- Highway 35 (Wisconsin)
- Highway 56 (Wisconsin)
- Highway 80 (Wisconsin)
- Highway 82 (Wisconsin)
- Highway 108 (Wisconsin)
- Highway 131 (Wisconsin)
- Highway 157 (Wisconsin)
- Highway 162 (Wisconsin)

=== Transit ===
- La Crosse MTU
- Scenic Mississippi Regional Transit

=== Railroads ===
- Amtrak
- BNSF
- Canadian Pacific
- La Crosse station

=== Public Airports ===
==== Commercial ====
- La Crosse Regional Airport

==== General Aviation ====
- Houston County Airport
- Viroqua Municipal Airport

== Cities ==
=== Primary ===
Onalaska was promoted as a principal city of the MSA when the Office of Management and Budget revised the definitions of metropolitan statistical areas in 2013.

== See also ==
- Wisconsin statistical areas
