= Minnesota State Highway 76 =

State highway in Minnesota, United States

Trunk Highway 76

- MN 76 highlighted in red

Route information
- Maintained by MnDOT
- Length: 36.767 mi (59.171 km)
- Existed: 1933–present

Major junctions
- South end: Iowa 76 at the Iowa state line in Eitzen
- MN 44 at Caledonia; MN 16 at Houston
- North end: I-90 / CR 12 at Pleasant Hill Township

Location
- Country: United States
- State: Minnesota
- Counties: Houston, Winona

Highway system
- Minnesota Trunk Highway System; Interstate; US; State; Legislative; Scenic
← US 75	→ MN 77

Minnesota State Highway 76 (MN 76) is a highway in southeast Minnesota, which runs from Iowa Highway 76 at the Iowa state line (near Eitzen), and continues north to its northern terminus at its interchange with Interstate Highway 90 in Pleasant Hill Township near Winona.

Highway 76 is 37 miles (60 km) in length.

== Route description ==
Highway 76 serves as a north–south route in southeast Minnesota between Caledonia, Houston, and Interstate 90.

The route passes through the Richard J. Dorer State Forest.

Beaver Creek Valley State Park is located 4 miles west of the junction of Highway 76 and Houston County Road 1 at Caledonia. The park entrance is located on County Road 1.

Highway 76 parallels State Highway 26 and State Highway 43 throughout its route.

The route is legally defined as Legislative Route 76 in the Minnesota Statutes.

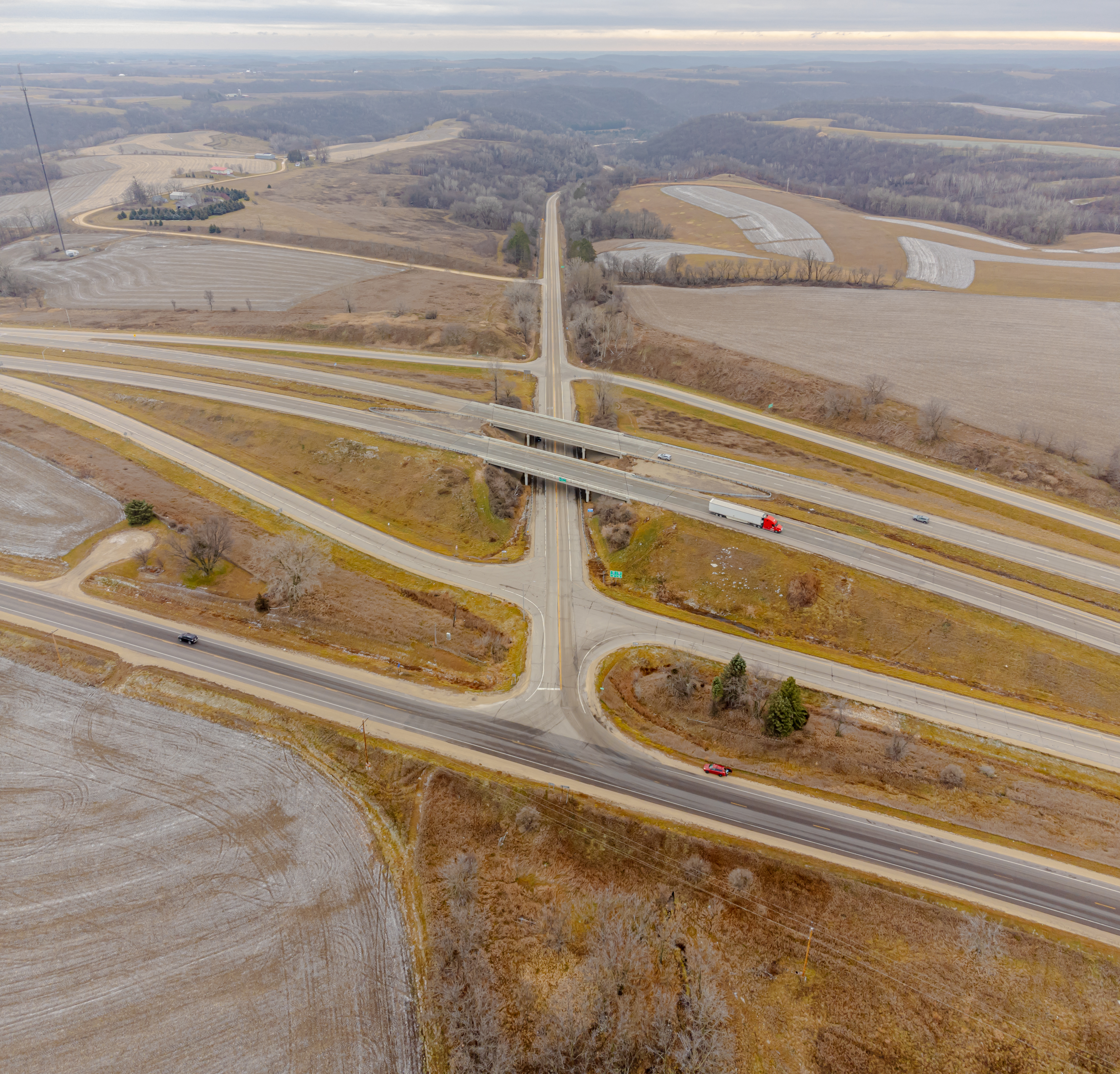
MN-76 & I-90 junction and northern terminus

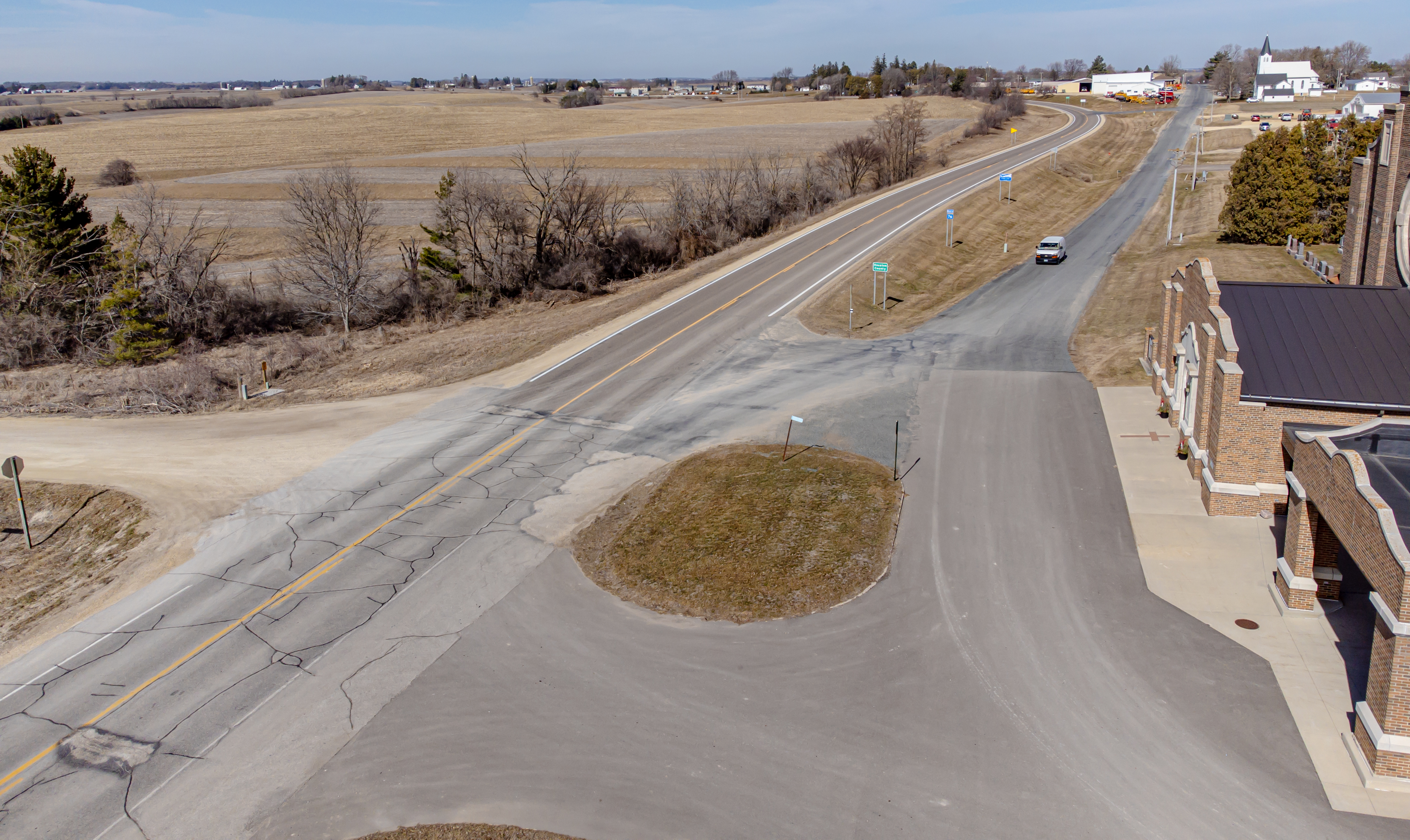
Southern terminus in Eitzen, Minnesota

== History ==
Highway 76 was authorized in 1933.

By 1953, only the section in Houston County was paved. All of Highway 76 was paved by 1963.

== Major intersections ==
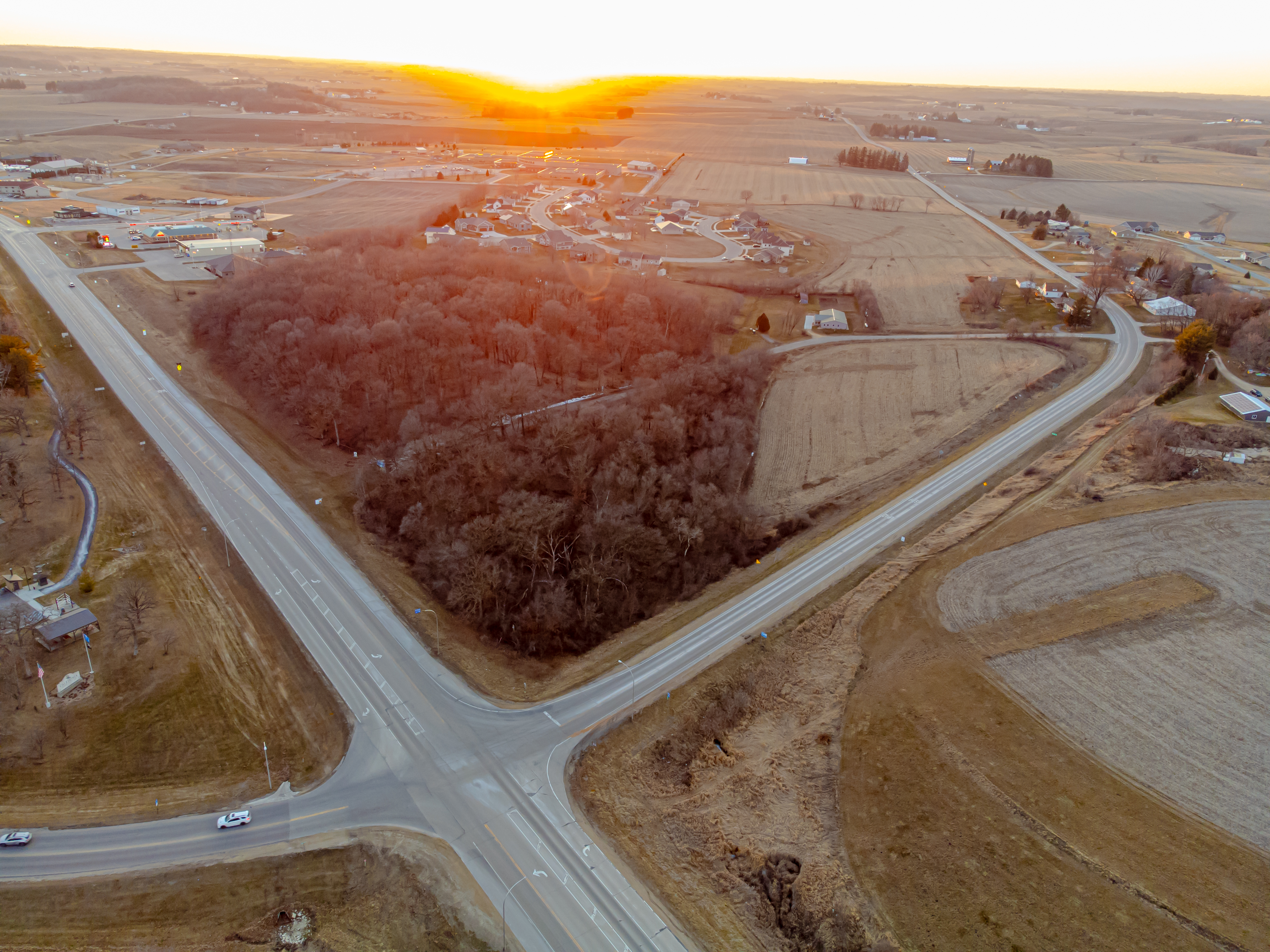
MN-76 junction with MN-44 north of Caledonia

County	Location	mi	km	Destinations	Notes
Houston	Winnebago Township	0.000	0.000	Iowa 76 south – Waukon	Continuation into Iowa
Houston	Caledonia Township	7.830	12.601	MN 44 west – Spring Grove	Southern end of MN 44 overlap
Houston	Caledonia	10.187	16.394	CSAH 3 – Brownsville	Former MN 249
Houston	Caledonia	10.949	17.621	MN 44 east – Hokah	Northern end of MN 44 overlap
Houston	Houston Township	22.170	35.679	MN 16 east – Hokah	Eastern end of MN 16 overlap
Houston	Houston	23.039	37.078	MN 16 west / CSAH 13 – Rushford	Western end of MN 16 overlap
Winona	Pleasant Hill Township	36.691	59.048	I-90 – La Crosse, Austin	Interchange; Exit 258 on I-90
Winona	Pleasant Hill Township	36.767	59.171	CSAH 12 – Witoka, Ridgeway	Northern terminus of MN-76
1.000 mi = 1.609 km; 1.000 km = 0.621 mi: Concurrency terminus
