= Minnesota State Highway 249 =

State highway in Minnesota, United States

Trunk Highway 249
- MN 249 highlighted in red

Route information
- Maintained by MnDOT
- Length: 15 mi (24 km)
- Existed: July 1, 1949–1989

Major junctions
- West end: MN 44 / MN 76 at Caledonia
- East end: MN 26 near Reno

Location
- Country: United States
- State: Minnesota
- Counties: Houston

Highway system
- Minnesota Trunk Highway System; Interstate; US; State; Legislative; Scenic
← MN 248	→ MN 250

Minnesota State Highway 249 was a highway in southeast Minnesota, which ran from its intersection with State Highways 44 and 76 in Caledonia and continued east to its eastern terminus at its intersection with State Highway 26 in Crooked Creek Township, south of Reno.

The route was a state marked route from 1949 to 1992. In the present day, nearly all of the route is known as Houston County Road 249.

The highway was also known as Main Street, Winnebago Street, and Adams Street in the city of Caledonia.

== Route description ==
Highway 249 had passed through the communities of Caledonia, Mayville Township, and Crooked Creek Township.

The highway was legally defined as Legislative Route 249 in the Minnesota Statutes § 161.115(180).

The roadway is unpaved from its intersection with Highway 26 to its intersection with Houston County Road 24.

== History ==
Highway 249 was authorized on July 1, 1949 and removed in 1989. Most of the road became County Road 249, except for two segments in Caledonia which became extensions of County Road 3 and County Road 5.

== Major intersections ==
The entire highway was in Houston County.

Location	mi	km	Destinations	Notes
Caledonia			MN 44 / MN 76	Western terminus
Caledonia			CSAH 3 (East Main Street)	
Caledonia			CSAH 5 (South Winnebago Street)	
Mayville Township			CSAH 32	
Crooked Creek Township			CSAH 24	
Crooked Creek Township			MN 26	Eastern terminus
1.000 mi = 1.609 km; 1.000 km = 0.621 mi
