= Black Hammer =

Black Hammer may refer to:

== Places ==
- Black Hammer, Minnesota, U.S.
- Black Hammer Township, Houston County, Minnesota, U.S.
- Black Hammer, a nickname by WWII Allied bomber crews for the Blechhammer, Nazi Germany camps and chemical plants

== Other uses ==
- Black Hammer (comics), a comics series
- Black Hammer, a 1951 novel by Gordon Landsborough
- The Black Hammer, a 1967 political work by Wes Andrews and Clyde Dalton
- Black Hammer Party, American political cult

== See also ==
- Svarthamaren Mountain, Antarctica, the name meaning 'Black Hammer' in Norwegian
