= Minnesota State Highway 16 =

State highway in Minnesota, United States

Trunk Highway 16
- MN 16 highlighted in red

Route information
- Maintained by MnDOT
- Length: 87.671 mi (141.093 km)
- Existed: 1980–present
- Tourist routes: Historic Bluff Country Scenic Byway; Great River Road

Major junctions
- West end: I-90 at Dexter
- US 63 at Spring Valley; MN 80 near Wykoff; US 52 at Preston; MN 250 at Lanesboro; MN 43 at Rushford; MN 76 at Houston; MN 44 at Hokah; MN 26 at La Crescent Township
- East end: US 14 / US 61 / WIS 16 at La Crescent

Location
- Country: United States
- State: Minnesota
- Counties: Mower, Fillmore, Houston

Highway system
- Minnesota Trunk Highway System; Interstate; US; State; Legislative; Scenic
← MN 15	→ MN 18

Minnesota State Highway 16 (MN 16) is an 87.671-mile-long (141.093 km) two-lane highway in southeast Minnesota, which runs from its interchange with Interstate Highway 90 in Dexter and continues east to its eastern terminus at the Wisconsin state line concurrent with U.S. Highways 14 and 61 outside La Crescent just west of La Crosse, Wisconsin.

The route was designated as a National Scenic Byway in 2003 as the Historic Bluff Country Scenic Byway. The roadway follows the route of old U.S. Highway 16.

== Route description ==
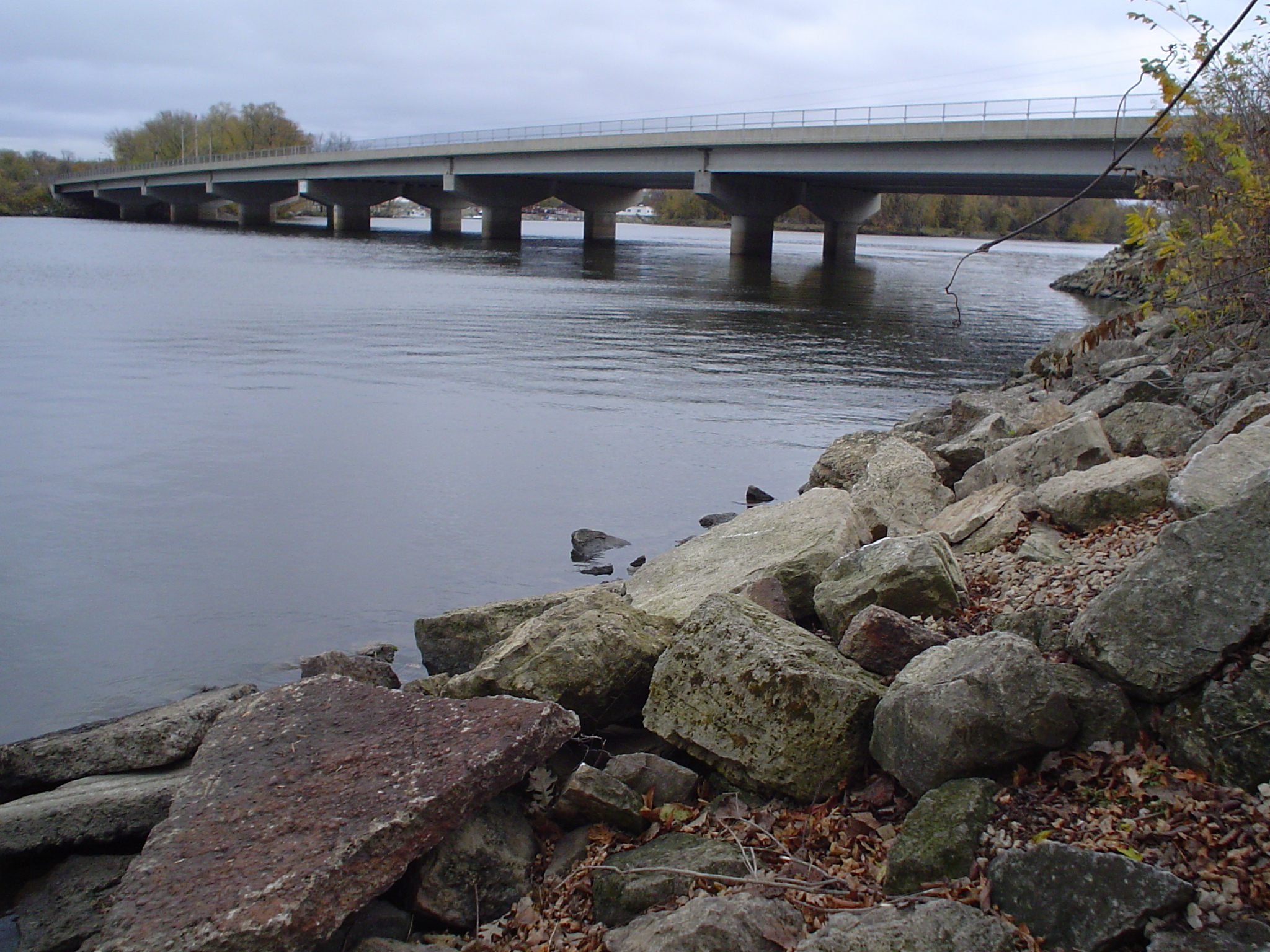
The La Crosse West Channel Bridge carrying US Route 14, US Route 61, Minnesota State Highway 16, and Wisconsin State Highway 16 across the Mississippi River between La Crescent, Minnesota, and La Crosse, Wisconsin. This is the river's West Channel.

Minnesota Trunk Highway 16 serves as the scenic east–west route in southeast Minnesota. The national scenic byway links together Dexter, Grand Meadow, Spring Valley, Preston, Lanesboro, Rushford Village, Peterson, Rushford, Houston, Hokah, and La Crescent. Highway 16 parallels Interstate 90 throughout its route and allows travelers the opportunity to experience Minnesota's Driftless Area.

The route passes through the Richard J. Dorer Memorial Hardwood State Forest in Fillmore and Houston counties.

Forestville Mystery Cave State Park is located near Highway 16 in Fillmore County. The park is located between Spring Valley and Preston. Further east, the Inspiration Point Wayside Rest is a rest stop outside Lanesboro that overlooks the Root River Valley.

The eastern terminus for Highway 16 is the Wisconsin state line at the Mississippi River outside La Crescent, concurrent with U.S. Highways 14 and 61.

The western terminus for the route is its interchange with Interstate 90 in Dexter.

== History ==
U.S. Highway 16
- Location: Manley–La Crescent
- Existed: 1926–1980
- History: Mostly replaced by Interstate 90

State Highway 16 was designated in 1980. The route was originally part of old U.S. Highway 16 from 1926 to 1980.

U.S. 16 was mostly replaced by Interstate Highway 90 within Minnesota.

State Highway 16 from Dexter to La Crescent is the only remaining section of this former U.S. route that exists as a trunk highway separate from Interstate 90.

After crossing the Mississippi River Bridge and the Wisconsin state line, old U.S. 16 continues on as Wisconsin Highway 16.

The only section of U.S. Highway 16 that remains in the present day is the east–west route between Rapid City, South Dakota and Yellowstone National Park in Wyoming.

== Major intersections ==
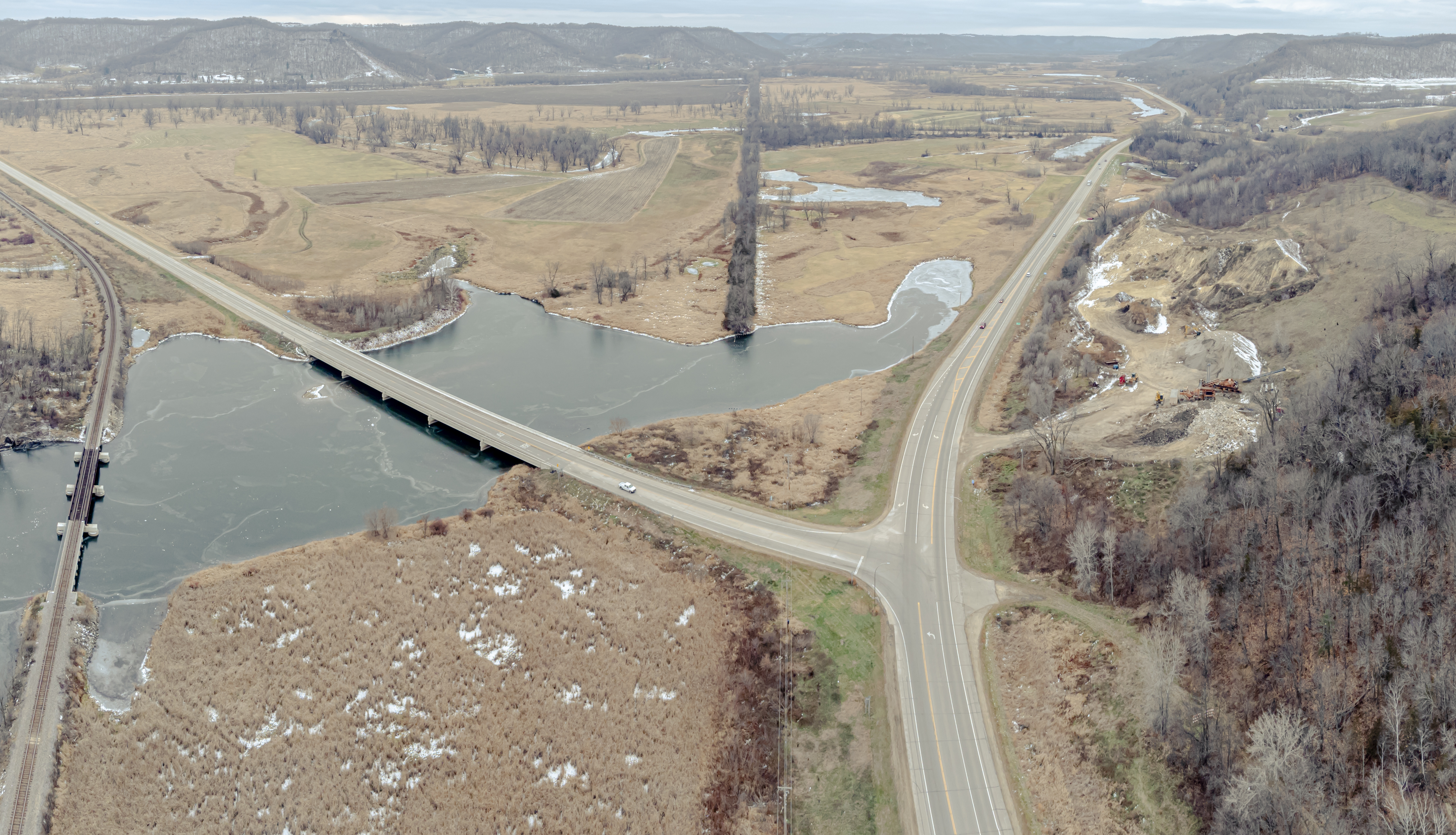
MN 16 & 26 Junction

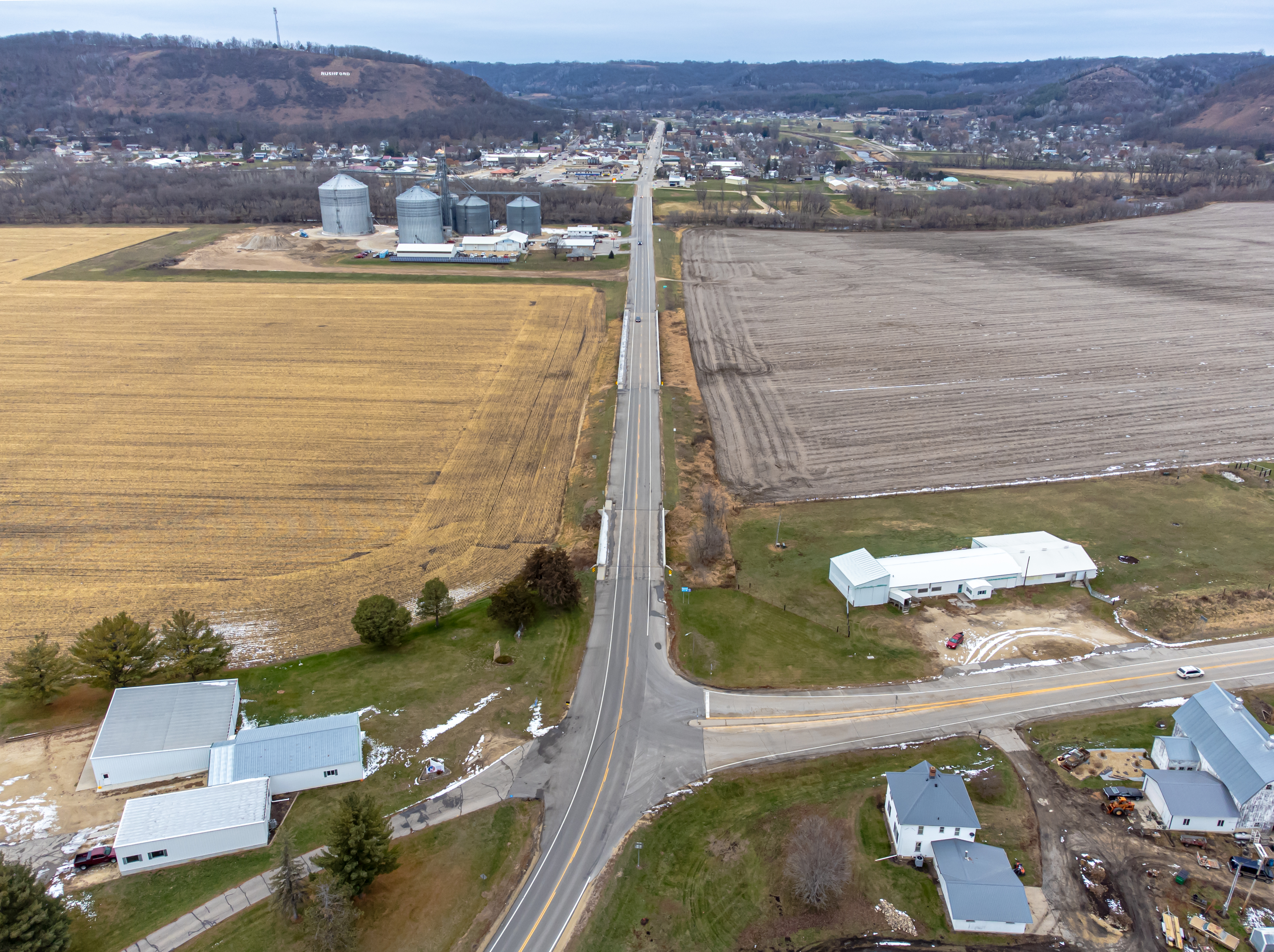
MN-43 and MN-16 junction in Rushford

County	Location	mi	km	Destinations	Notes
Mower	Dexter	0.000– 0.202	0.000– 0.325	CSAH 7 north / I-90 – Austin, Rochester	Western terminus; western end of CSAH 7 overlap; I-90 exit 193; road continues north as CSAH 7
Mower	Dexter	0.286	0.460	CSAH 7 south (670 Avenue) – Elkton	Eastern end of CSAH 7 overlap
Mower	Frankford Township	11.182	17.996	US 63 north (Laura Ingalls Wilder Historic Highway) – Stewartville	Western end of US 63 overlap
Fillmore	Spring Valley	16.327	26.276	US 63 south / CSAH 1 – Chester IA	Eastern end of US 63 overlap; CSAH 1 formerly MN 74
Fillmore	Fillmore Township	22.602	36.374	MN 80 north – Wykoff	
Fillmore	Fountain Township	31.675	50.976	US 52 north – Chatfield	Western end of US 52 overlap
Fillmore	Preston Township	35.210	56.665	US 52 south (Laura Ingalls Wilder Historic Highway) – Harmony	Eastern end of US 52 overlap
Fillmore	Lanesboro	40.534	65.233	MN 250 – Root River State Trail	
Fillmore	Rushford	58.544	94.217	MN 43 north – Root River State Trail	Western end of MN 43 overlap
Fillmore	Rushford Village	59.092	95.099	MN 43 south – Mabel	Eastern end of MN 43 overlap
Houston	Houston	70.112	112.834	MN 76 north (Grant Street)	Western end of MN 76 overlap
Houston	Houston Township	70.981	114.233	MN 76 south – Caledonia	Eastern end of MN 76 overlap
Houston	Hokah	82.024	132.005	MN 44 west – Caledonia	
Houston	La Crescent Township	85.222	137.152	MN 26 south / Great River Road – Brownsville	Western end of Great River Road overlap
Houston	La Crescent	87.671	141.093	US 14 west / US 61 north / I-90 Alt. west / Great River Road north / CSAH 6 – Winona	Western end of US 14/US 61/I-90 Alt. overlap; eastern end of Great River Road overlap
Mississippi River		89.451	143.957	La Crosse West Channel Bridge	
Mississippi River		89.451	143.957	Alt. I-90 / US 14 east / WIS 16 east / US 61 south – La Crosse	Continuation into La Crosse, Wisconsin
1.000 mi = 1.609 km; 1.000 km = 0.621 mi: Concurrency terminus
