= Schechs Mill, Minnesota =

Unincorporated community in Minnesota, United States

Schechs Mill
- Unincorporated community
- Location within Minnesota Location within the United States
- Coordinates: 43°40′03″N 91°34′52″W
- Country: United States
- State: Minnesota
- County: Houston
- Elevation: 748 ft (228 m)
- Time zone: UTC-6 (Central (CST))
  - Summer (DST): UTC-5 (CDT)
- Area code: 507
- GNIS feature ID: 654933

Schechs Mill is an unincorporated community in Caledonia Township, Houston County, Minnesota, United States.
