= Union Township, Houston County, Minnesota =

Union Township, Minnesota
- Township
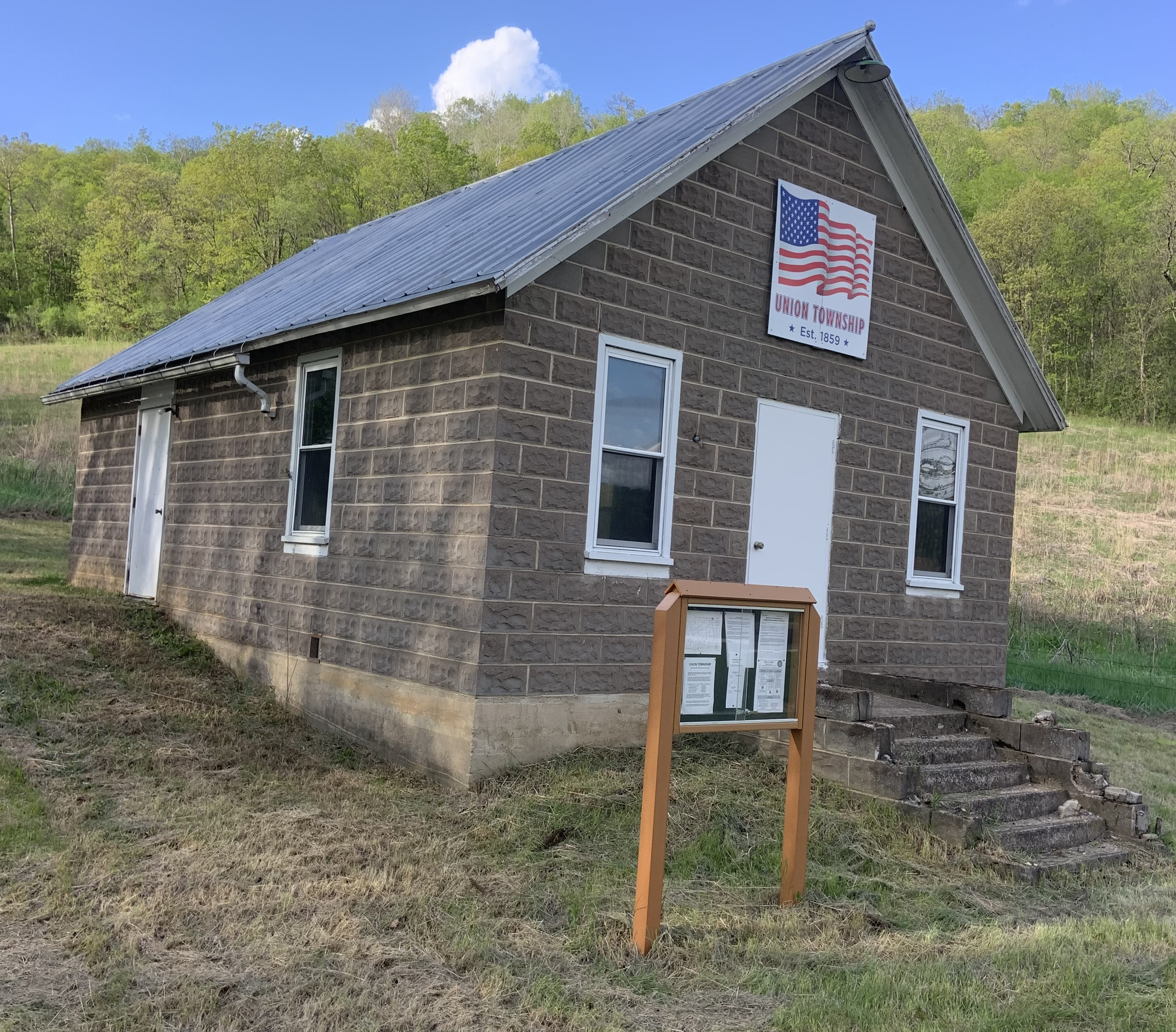
- Union Township Town Hall in Houston County, Minnesota, On MN-44.

- Location within the state of Minnesota Union Township, Minnesota (the United States)
- Coordinates: 43°43′25″N 91°24′15″W
- Country: United States
- State: Minnesota
- County: Houston

Area
  - Total: 26.3 sq mi (68.0 km^{2})
  - Land: 26.3 sq mi (68.0 km^{2})
  - Water: 0.039 sq mi (0.1 km^{2})
- Elevation: 820 ft (250 m)

Population (2000)
  - Total: 385
  - Density: 15/sq mi (5.7/km^{2})
- Time zone: UTC-6 (Central (CST))
  - Summer (DST): UTC-5 (CDT)
- FIPS code: 27-66208
- GNIS feature ID: 0665839

Union Township is a township in Houston County, Minnesota, United States. The population was 385 at the 2000 census.

Union Township was organized in 1859.

== Geography ==
According to the United States Census Bureau, the township has a total area of 26.3 square miles (68.0 km^{2}), of which 26.2 square miles (68.0 km^{2}) is land and 0.04 square mile (0.1 km^{2}) (0.08%) is water.

== Demographics ==
As of the census of 2000, there were 385 people, 134 households, and 105 families residing in the township. The population density was 14.7 people per square mile (5.7/km^{2}). There were 140 housing units at an average density of 5.3/sq mi (2.1/km^{2}). The racial makeup of the township was 98.18% White, 1.30% Native American and 0.52% Pacific Islander.

There were 134 households, out of which 41.8% had children under the age of 18 living with them, 72.4% were married couples living together, 5.2% had a female householder with no husband present, and 20.9% were non-families. 17.9% of all households were made up of individuals, and 5.2% had someone living alone who was 65 years of age or older. The average household size was 2.87 and the average family size was 3.30.

In the township the population was spread out, with 29.4% under the age of 18, 7.8% from 18 to 24, 31.7% from 25 to 44, 21.6% from 45 to 64, and 9.6% who were 65 years of age or older. The median age was 35 years. For every 100 females, there were 108.1 males. For every 100 females age 18 and over, there were 110.9 males.

The median income for a household in the township was $51,250, and the median income for a family was $54,531. Males had a median income of $34,063 versus $22,115 for females. The per capita income for the township was $19,573. About 0.9% of families and 0.7% of the population were below the poverty line, including none of those under age 18 and 9.4% of those age 65 or over.
