= Minnesota State Highway 44 =

State highway in Minnesota, United States

Trunk Highway 44

- MN 44 highlighted in red

Route information
- Maintained by MnDOT
- Length: 35.978 mi (57.901 km)
- Existed: 1920–present

Major junctions
- West end: US 52 in Canton Township
- MN 43 at Mabel; MN 76 at Caledonia
- East end: MN 16 in Hokah

Location
- Country: United States
- State: Minnesota
- Counties: Fillmore, Houston

Highway system
- Minnesota Trunk Highway System; Interstate; US; State; Legislative; Scenic
← MN 43	→ MN 45

Minnesota State Highway 44 (MN 44) is a highway in southeast Minnesota, which runs from its intersection with U.S. 52 in Canton Township, near Prosper, and continues east to its eastern terminus at its intersection with State Highway 16 in Hokah, near La Crescent.

Highway 44 is 36 miles (58 km) in length.

== Route description ==
Highway 44 serves as an east–west route between Mabel, Spring Grove, Caledonia, and Hokah in southeast Minnesota.

The section of Highway 44 between Caledonia and Hokah passes through the Richard J. Dorer State Forest.

Highway 44 runs concurrent with State Highway 76 for three miles at Caledonia.

Beaver Creek Valley State Park is located near the junction of Highways 44 and 76 at the north edge of Caledonia. The park entrance is located four miles west on County Road 1 via Highway 76.

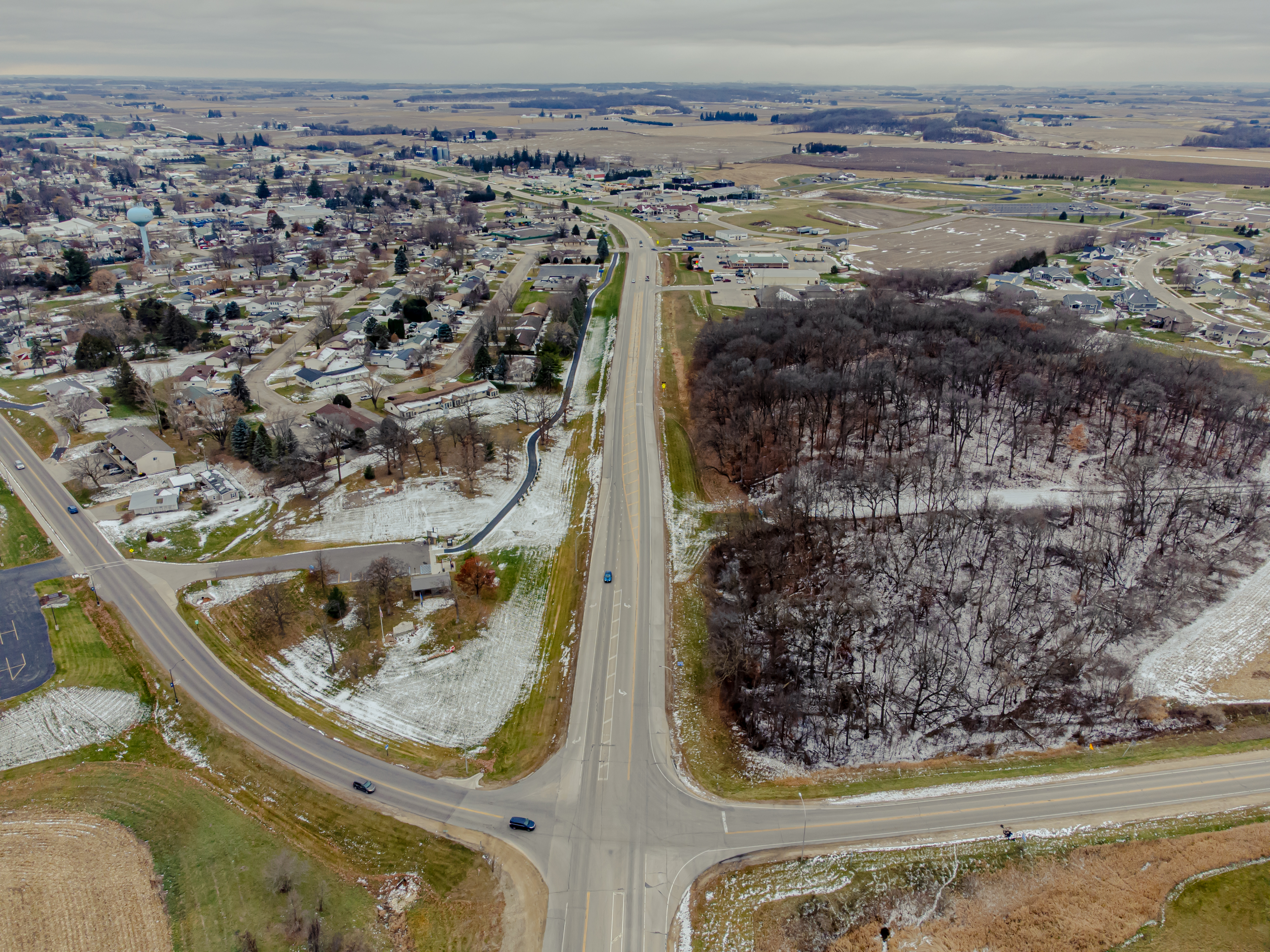
MN-44 through Caledonia

== History ==
Highway 44 was authorized in 1920. The route was paved in its entirety by 1940.

The route was originally designated as an auto trail named the Southern Minnesota Air Line in a 1919 application. The Southern Minnesota Air Line continued west from Preston to the South Dakota state line on a route that later followed old U.S. Highway 16.

At one time, Highway 44 had continued farther west, extending over what is now County Highway 44 in Fillmore County. The section of present-day County 44 between Harmony and U.S. Highway 63 (south of Spring Valley) was designated Highway 44 between 1972 and 1995.

== Major intersections ==
County	Location	mi	km	Destinations	Notes
Fillmore	Beaver Township	0.00	0.00	US 63 – Waterloo IA, Spring Valley	Programmed mile 0; former western terminus
Fillmore	Harmony	18.0	29.0	MN 139 south – Harmony, Cresco IA	Former west end of MN 139 overlap
Fillmore	Harmony	18.9	30.4	US 52 north / MN 139 ends – Preston, Canton	Former east end of MN 139 overlap; former west end of US 52 overlap
Fillmore	Canton Township	29.937	48.179	US 52 (Laura Ingalls Wilder Historic Highway) – Preston, Decorah IA	Current western terminus
Fillmore	Mabel	35.382	56.942	MN 43 – Rushford	
Houston	Caledonia Township	50.418	81.140	MN 76 south – Eitzen	West end of MN 76 overlap
Houston	Caledonia	52.833	85.026	CSAH 3 – Brownsville	Formerly MN 249
Houston	Caledonia	53.595	86.253	MN 76 north – Houston, Beaver Creek Valley State Park	East end of MN 76 overlap
Houston	Hokah	66.348	106.777	MN 16 (Historic Bluff Country Scenic Byway) – La Crescent, Houston	
1.000 mi = 1.609 km; 1.000 km = 0.621 mi: Closed/former; Concurrency terminus
