= Black Hammer, Minnesota =

Unincorporated community in Minnesota, United States

Black Hammer
- Unincorporated community
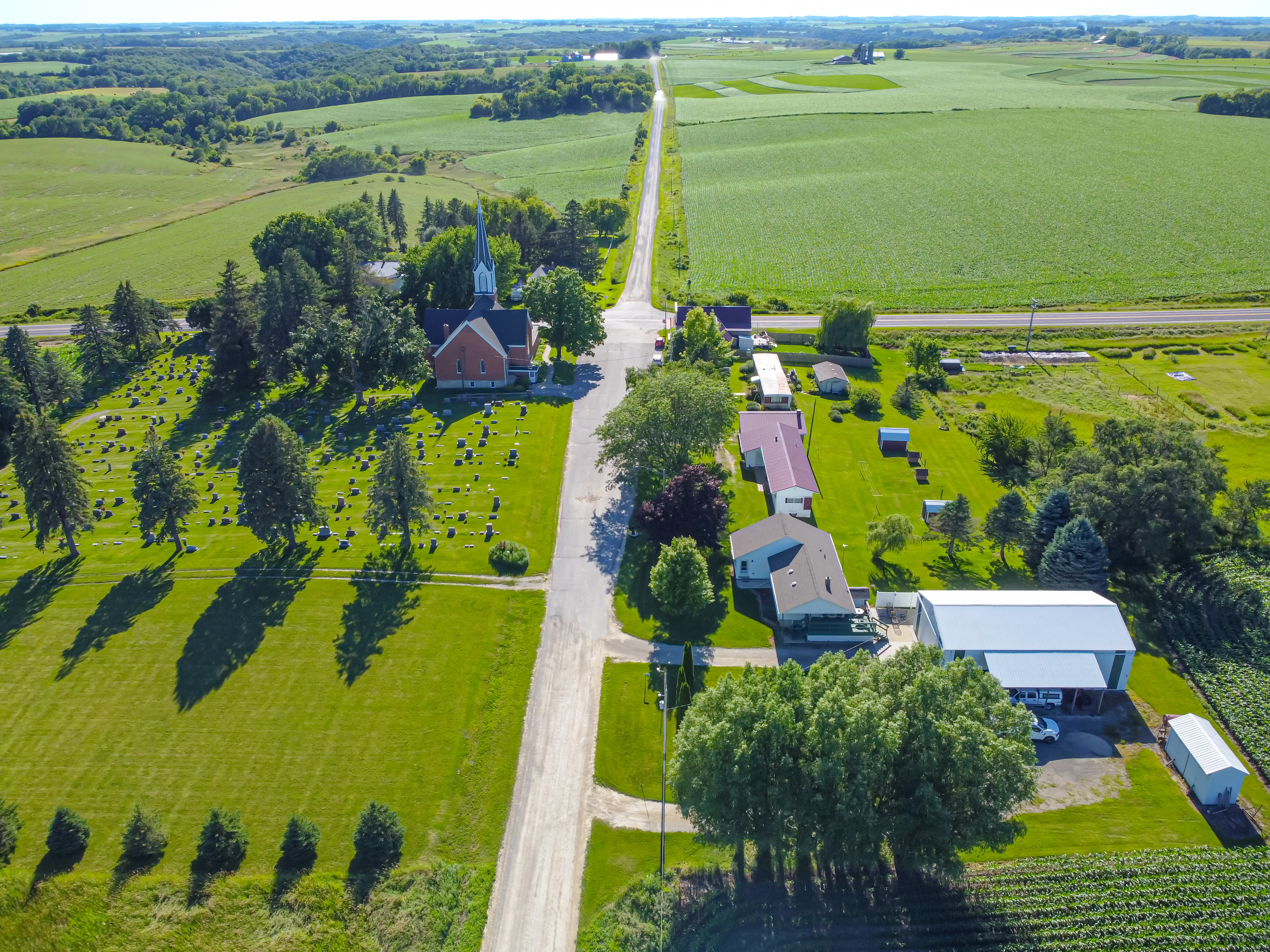
- Houston County Road 4 and Blackhammer Drive junction in town

- Location within Minnesota Location within the United States
- Coordinates: 43°36′59″N 91°39′40″W
- Country: United States
- State: Minnesota
- County: Houston
- Elevation: 1,175 ft (358 m)
- Time zone: UTC-6 (Central (CST))
  - Summer (DST): UTC-5 (CDT)
- Area code: 507
- GNIS feature ID: 654607

Black Hammer is an unincorporated community in Black Hammer Township, Houston County, Minnesota, United States.
