= La Crescent Township, Houston County, Minnesota =

La Crescent Township, Minnesota
- Township
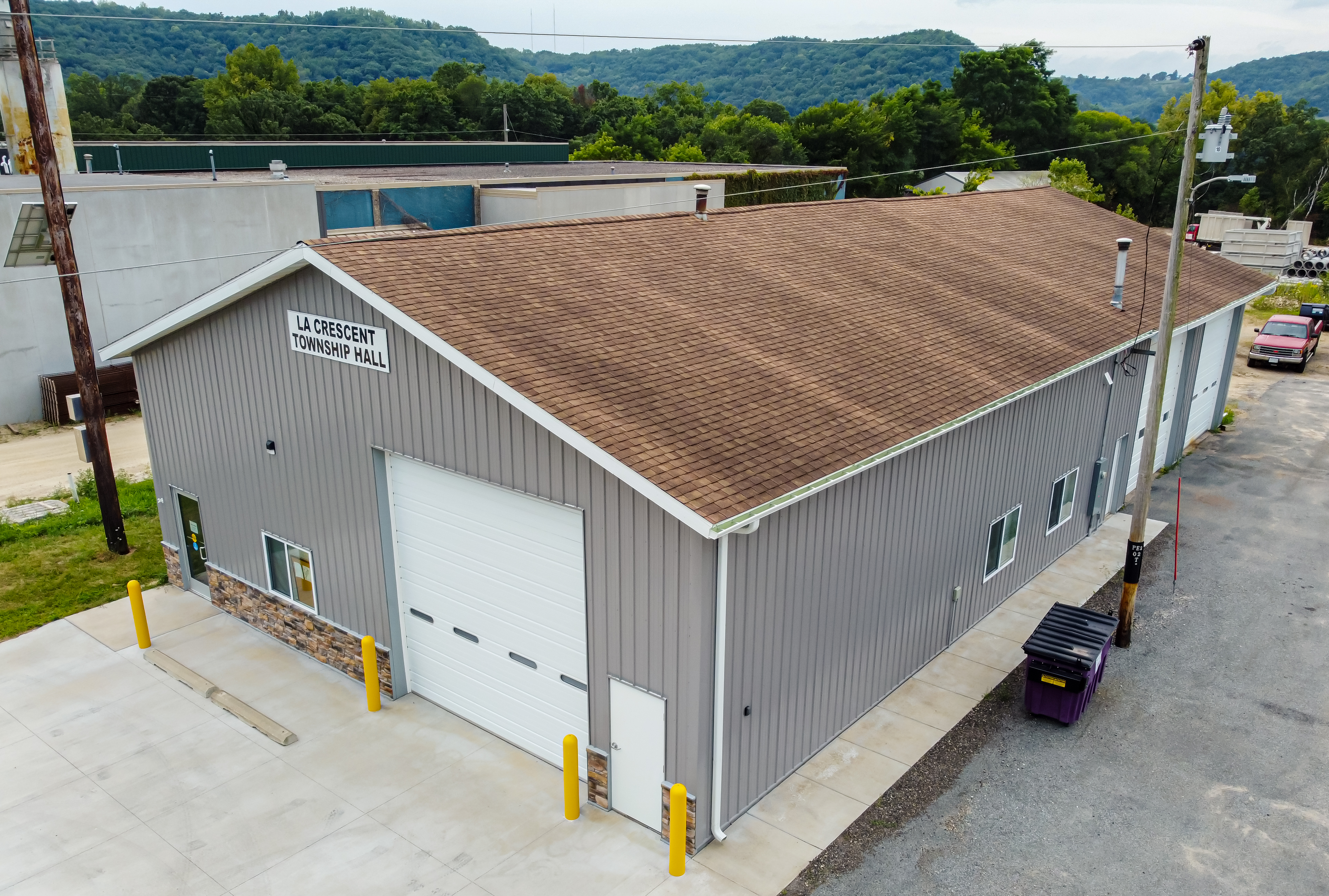
- Town hall

- Location within the state of Minnesota La Crescent Township, Minnesota (the United States)
- Coordinates: 43°49′25″N 91°19′47″W
- Country: United States
- State: Minnesota
- County: Houston

Area
  - Total: 22.7 sq mi (58.9 km^{2})
  - Land: 21.3 sq mi (55.1 km^{2})
  - Water: 1.5 sq mi (3.8 km^{2})
- Elevation: 1,120 ft (340 m)

Population (2000)
  - Total: 1,487
  - Density: 70/sq mi (27/km^{2})
- Time zone: UTC-6 (Central (CST))
  - Summer (DST): UTC-5 (CDT)
- ZIP code: 55947
- Area code: 507
- FIPS code: 27-33884
- GNIS feature ID: 0664652
- Website: https://www.lacrescenttownship.com/

La Crescent Township is an urban township in Houston County, Minnesota, United States. The population was 1,487 at the 2000 census.

La Crescent Township was organized in 1858.

== Geography ==
According to the United States Census Bureau, the township has a total area of 22.8 square miles (59 km^{2}), of which 21.3 square miles (55 km^{2}) is land and 1.5 square miles (3.9 km^{2}) (6.55%) is water.

== Demographics ==
As of the census of 2000, there were 1,487 people, 518 households, and 438 families residing in the township. The population density was 69.9 inhabitants per square mile (27.0/km^{2}). There were 531 housing units at an average density of 25.0 per square mile (9.7/km^{2}). The racial makeup of the township was 98.86% White, 0.27% African American, 0.13% Native American, 0.54% Asian, 0.07% from other races, and 0.13% from two or more races. Hispanic or Latino of any race were 0.27% of the population.

There were 518 households, out of which 40.7% had children under the age of 18 living with them, 78.8% were married couples living together, 3.9% had a female householder with no husband present, and 15.3% were non-families. 12.7% of all households were made up of individuals, and 4.6% had someone living alone who was 65 years of age or older. The average household size was 2.87 and the average family size was 3.13.

In the township the population was spread out, with 28.4% under the age of 18, 6.1% from 18 to 24, 26.8% from 25 to 44, 30.2% from 45 to 64, and 8.5% who were 65 years of age or older. The median age was 40 years. For every 100 females, there were 100.4 males. For every 100 females age 18 and over, there were 103.4 males.

The median income for a household in the township was $58,603, and the median income for a family was $64,886. Males had a median income of $41,071 versus $28,938 for females. The per capita income for the township was $22,298. About 1.6% of families and 2.7% of the population were below the poverty line, including 2.0% of those under age 18 and 2.1% of those age 65 or over.

== See also ==
- La Crescent, Minnesota
