= Black Hammer Township, Houston County, Minnesota =

Black Hammer Township, Minnesota
- Township
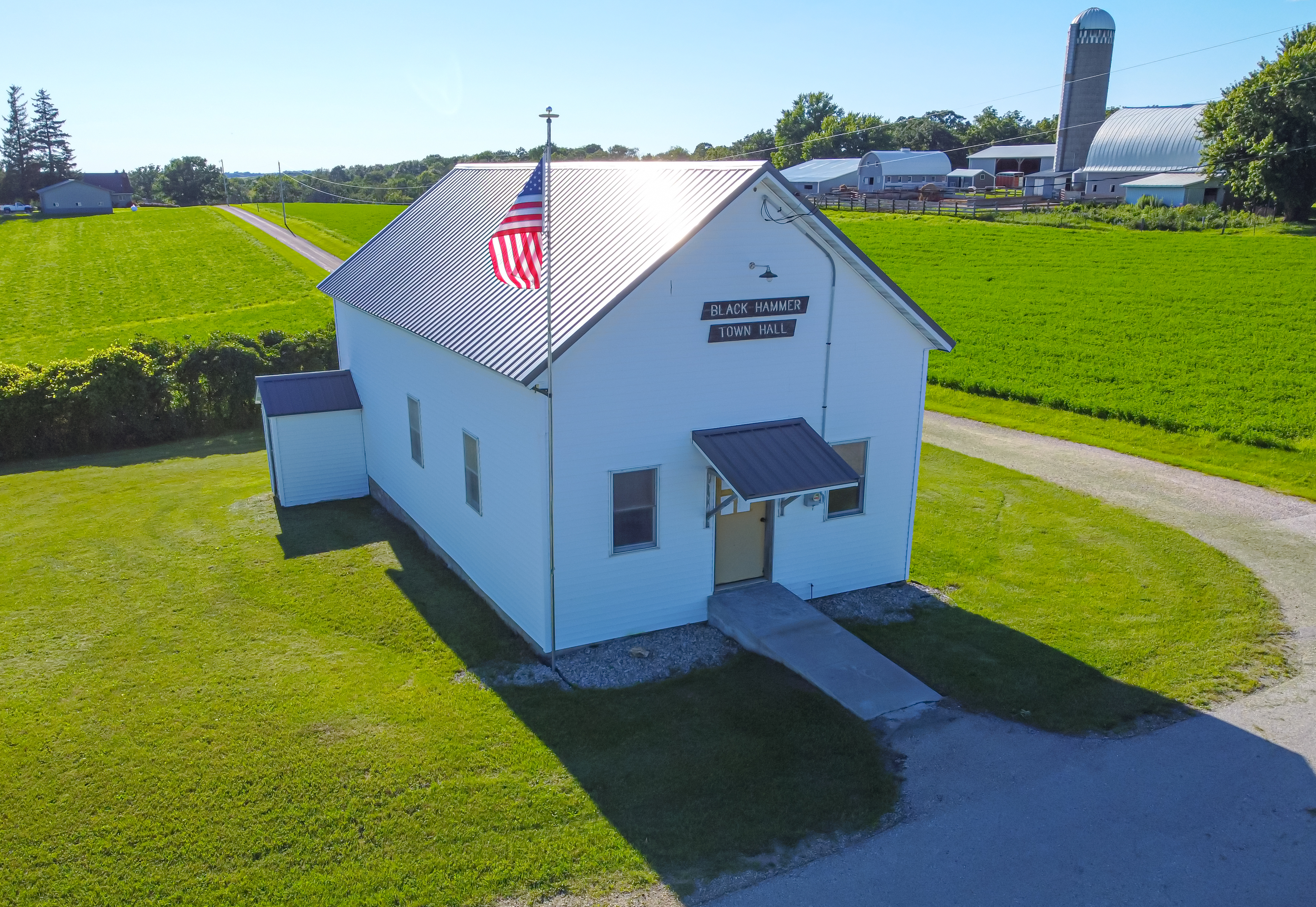
- Town Hall

- Location within the state of Minnesota Black Hammer Township, Minnesota (the United States)
- Coordinates: 43°39′7″N 91°40′22″W
- Country: United States
- State: Minnesota
- County: Houston

Area
  - Total: 35.7 sq mi (92.5 km^{2})
  - Land: 35.7 sq mi (92.5 km^{2})
  - Water: 0 sq mi (0.0 km^{2})
- Elevation: 1,053 ft (321 m)

Population (2000)
  - Total: 326
  - Density: 9.1/sq mi (3.5/km^{2})
- Time zone: UTC-6 (Central (CST))
  - Summer (DST): UTC-5 (CDT)
- FIPS code: 27-06292
- GNIS feature ID: 0663608

Black Hammer Township is a township in Houston County, Minnesota, United States. The population was 326 at the 2000 census. The unincorporated community of Black Hammer is located in the township.

== Geography ==
According to the United States Census Bureau, the township has a total area of 35.7 square miles (92 km^{2}), all land.

== Demographics ==
As of the census of 2000, there were 326 people, 111 households, and 91 families residing in the township. The population density was 9.1 inhabitants per square mile (3.5/km^{2}). There were 132 housing units at an average density of 3.7 per square mile (1.4/km^{2}). The racial makeup of the township was 99.99% White, 0.01% African American, 0.01% from other races, and 0.31% from two or more races. Hispanic or Latino of any race made up less than 0.02% of the population.

There were 111 households, out of which 40.5% had children under the age of 18 living with them, 68.5% were married couples living together, 4.5% had a female householder with no husband present, and 18.0% were non-families. 17.1% of all households were made up of individuals, and 5.4% had someone living alone who was 65 years of age or older. The average household size was 2.94 and the average family size was 3.26.

In the township the population was spread out, with 28.2% under the age of 18, 4.9% from 18 to 24, 27.9% from 25 to 44, 27.6% from 45 to 64, and 11.3% who were 65 years of age or older. The median age was 40 years. For every 100 females, there were 114.5 males. For every 100 females age 18 and over, there were 122.9 males.

The median income for a household in the township was $37,857, and the median income for a family was $39,464. Males had a median income of $21,806 versus $17,344 for females. The per capita income for the township was $14,673. About 5.6% of families and 9.3% of the population were below the poverty line, including none of those under age 18 and 11.8% of those age 65 or over.

== History ==
The first settlement at Black Hammer Township was made in 1852.

At the first town meeting on April 5, 1859, a motion was made to name the town "Clinton." The state government rejected the name because there was already a Clinton, Minnesota. At a later date the name Black Hammer was decided upon as a partial translation of the Norwegian phrase "Sort Hammer." A history of the county from 1882 tells the story of how the name came about:

Knud Olson Bergo, who was living just across the town line in Spring Grove, on getting up one morning, saw that a fire had swept over the prairie in the south part of the town...Its charred appearance at once suggested to his mind a certain bluff located in Slidre Valders, Norway, which was Mr. Bergo's birthplace, and so he exclaiming in Norwegian, "Sort Hammer," which signifies Black Bluff, and the people have had the good sense to retain the name to this day, which, it will be perceived, is composed of an English and a Norwegian word.
