= Winnebago Township, Houston County, Minnesota =

Winnebago Township, Minnesota
- Township
- Location within the state of Minnesota Winnebago Township, Minnesota (the United States)
- Coordinates: 43°32′14″N 91°26′7″W
- Country: United States
- State: Minnesota
- County: Houston

Area
  - Total: 35.2 sq mi (91.1 km^{2})
  - Land: 35.2 sq mi (91.1 km^{2})
  - Water: 0 sq mi (0.0 km^{2})
- Elevation: 750 ft (230 m)

Population (2000)
  - Total: 257
  - Density: 7.3/sq mi (2.8/km^{2})
- Time zone: UTC-6 (Central (CST))
  - Summer (DST): UTC-5 (CDT)
- FIPS code: 27-70960
- GNIS feature ID: 0666022

Winnebago Township is a township in Houston County, Minnesota, United States. The population was 257 at the 2000 census.

Winnebago Township was organized in 1858, and named after Winnebago Creek.

== Geography ==
According to the United States Census Bureau, the township has a total area of 35.2 square miles (91.1 km^{2}), all land.

== Demographics ==
As of the census of 2000, there were 257 people, 94 households, and 67 families residing in the township. The population density was 7.3 people per square mile (2.8/km^{2}). There were 108 housing units at an average density of 3.1/sq mi (1.2/km^{2}). The racial makeup of the township was 100.00% White. Hispanic or Latino of any race were 0.39% of the population.

There were 94 households, out of which 30.9% had children under the age of 18 living with them, 68.1% were married couples living together, and 28.7% were non-families. 26.6% of all households were made up of individuals, and 11.7% had someone living alone who was 65 years of age or older. The average household size was 2.73 and the average family size was 3.40.

In the township the population was spread out, with 29.6% under the age of 18, 7.0% from 18 to 24, 29.2% from 25 to 44, 23.3% from 45 to 64, and 10.9% who were 65 years of age or older. The median age was 37 years. For every 100 females, there were 123.5 males. For every 100 females age 18 and over, there were 118.1 males.

The median income for a household in the township was $38,750, and the median income for a family was $49,063. Males had a median income of $23,542 versus $19,250 for females. The per capita income for the township was $18,021. About 3.2% of families and 8.0% of the population were below the poverty line, including 13.9% of those under the age of eighteen and none of those 65 or over.
