= Crooked Creek Township, Houston County, Minnesota =

Crooked Creek Township, Minnesota
- Township
- Location within the state of Minnesota Crooked Creek Township, Minnesota (the United States)
- Coordinates: 43°36′21″N 91°18′38″W
- Country: United States
- State: Minnesota
- County: Houston

Area
  - Total: 33.8 sq mi (87.6 km^{2})
  - Land: 32.0 sq mi (83.0 km^{2})
  - Water: 1.7 sq mi (4.5 km^{2})
- Elevation: 1,073 ft (327 m)

Population (2000)
  - Total: 323
  - Density: 10/sq mi (3.9/km^{2})
- Time zone: UTC-6 (Central (CST))
  - Summer (DST): UTC-5 (CDT)
- FIPS code: 27-13816
- GNIS feature ID: 0663890

Crooked Creek Township is a township in Houston County, Minnesota, United States. The population was 285 at the 2010 census. The unincorporated community of Reno is located in the township.

Crooked Creek Township was organized in 1858, and named from Crooked Creek.

== Geography ==
According to the United States Census Bureau, the township has a total area of 33.8 square miles (88 km^{2}), of which 32.0 square miles (83 km^{2}) is land and 1.8 square miles (4.7 km^{2}) (5.3%) is water.

== Demographics ==
As of the census of 2000, there were 323 people, 115 households, and 89 families residing in the township. The population density was 10.1 inhabitants per square mile (3.9/km^{2}). There were 129 housing units at an average density of 4.0 per square mile (1.5/km^{2}). The racial makeup of the township was 97.83% White, 0.93% African American, 0.62% from other races, and 0.62% from two or more races. Hispanic or Latino of any race were 1.24% of the population.

There were 115 households, out of which 37.4% had children under the age of 18 living with them, 67.8% were married couples living together, 6.1% had a female householder with no husband present, and 22.6% were non-families. 20.0% of all households were made up of individuals, and 7.0% had someone living alone who was 65 years of age or older. The average household size was 2.81 and the average family size was 3.25.

In the township the population was spread out, with 31.3% under the age of 18, 6.2% from 18 to 24, 23.8% from 25 to 44, 26.3% from 45 to 64, and 12.4% who were 65 years of age or older. The median age was 40 years. For every 100 females, there were 118.2 males. For every 100 females age 18 and over, there were 124.2 males.

The median income for a household in the township was $38,929, and the median income for a family was $41,563. Males had a median income of $30,250 versus $17,083 for females. The per capita income for the township was $14,493. About 6.3% of families and 5.9% of the population were below the poverty line, including 4.0% of those under age 18 and 11.1% of those age 65 or over.
