= Mayville Township, Houston County, Minnesota =

Coordinates: 43°37′57″N 91°26′27″W

Mayville Township is a township in Houston County, Minnesota, United States. The population was 427 at the 2000 census.

Mayville Township was organized in 1858, and named after Mayville, New York, the native home of an early settler.

== Geography ==
According to the United States Census Bureau, the township has a total area of 30.6 square miles (79.3 km^{2}), of which 30.5 square miles (79.1 km^{2}) is land and 0.1 square mile (0.2 km^{2}) (0.23%) is water.

== Demographics ==
As of the census of 2000, there were 427 people, 134 households, and 112 families residing in the township. The population density was 14.0 people per square mile (5.4/km^{2}). There were 142 housing units at an average density of 4.6/sq mi (1.8/km^{2}). The racial makeup of the township was 99.30% White, 0.23% Native American, and 0.47% from two or more races. Hispanic or Latino of any race were 0.94% of the population.

There were 134 households, out of which 41.8% had children under the age of 18 living with them, 73.1% were married couples living together, 3.7% had a female householder with no husband present, and 16.4% were non-families. 14.2% of all households were made up of individuals, and 3.7% had someone living alone who was 65 years of age or older. The average household size was 3.19 and the average family size was 3.51.

In the township the population was spread out, with 35.8% under the age of 18, 8.2% from 18 to 24, 23.4% from 25 to 44, 23.4% from 45 to 64, and 9.1% who were 65 years of age or older. The median age was 33 years. For every 100 females, there were 116.8 males. For every 100 females age 18 and over, there were 126.4 males.

The median income for a household in the township was $41,979, and the median income for a family was $47,188. Males had a median income of $26,176 versus $19,375 for females. The per capita income for the township was $15,475. About 6.4% of families and 7.9% of the population were below the poverty line, including 9.8% of those under age 18 and 2.3% of those age 65 or over.
