= Hokah, Minnesota =

City in Minnesota, United States

Hokah
- City
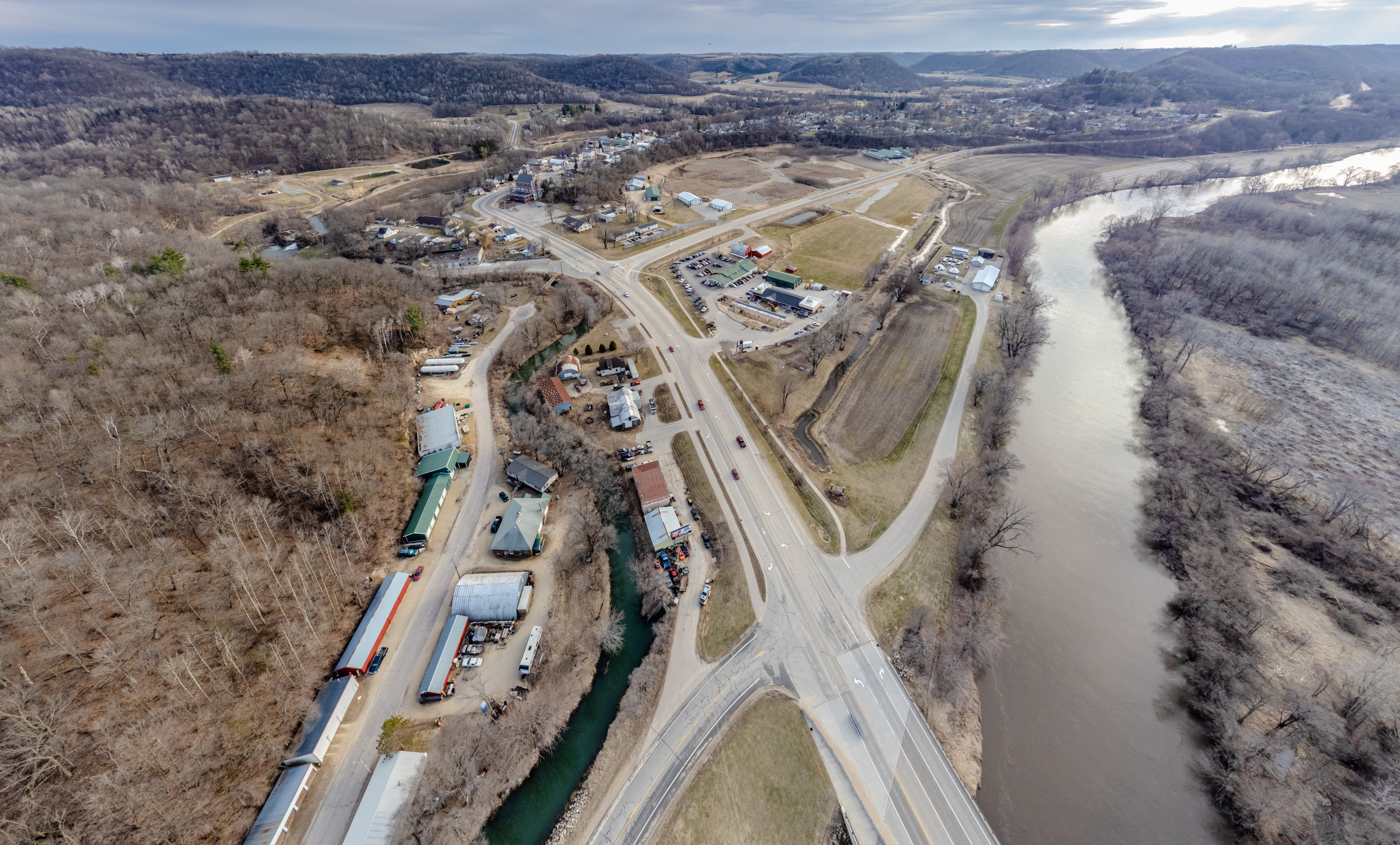
- Aerial view of Hokah, Minnesota

- Location of Hokah, Minnesota
- Coordinates: 43°45′36″N 91°21′00″W
- Country: United States
- State: Minnesota
- County: Houston
- Founded: 1851

Government
  - Mayor: Lee Tippery

Area
  - Total: 0.72 sq mi (1.86 km^{2})
  - Land: 0.70 sq mi (1.81 km^{2})
  - Water: 0.015 sq mi (0.04 km^{2})
- Elevation: 643 ft (196 m)

Population (2020)
  - Total: 553
  - Density: 790.9/sq mi (305.36/km^{2})
- Time zone: UTC-6 (Central (CST))
  - Summer (DST): UTC-5 (CDT)
- ZIP code: 55941
- Area code: 507
- FIPS code: 27-29510
- GNIS feature ID: 2394395
- Website: www.cityofhokah-mn.gov

Hokah (/ˈhoʊkə/ HOH-kə) is a city in Houston County, Minnesota, United States. As of the 2020 census, Hokah had a population of 553. Hokah is located near the confluence of the Root and Mississippi rivers, opposite La Crosse, Wisconsin.

== History ==
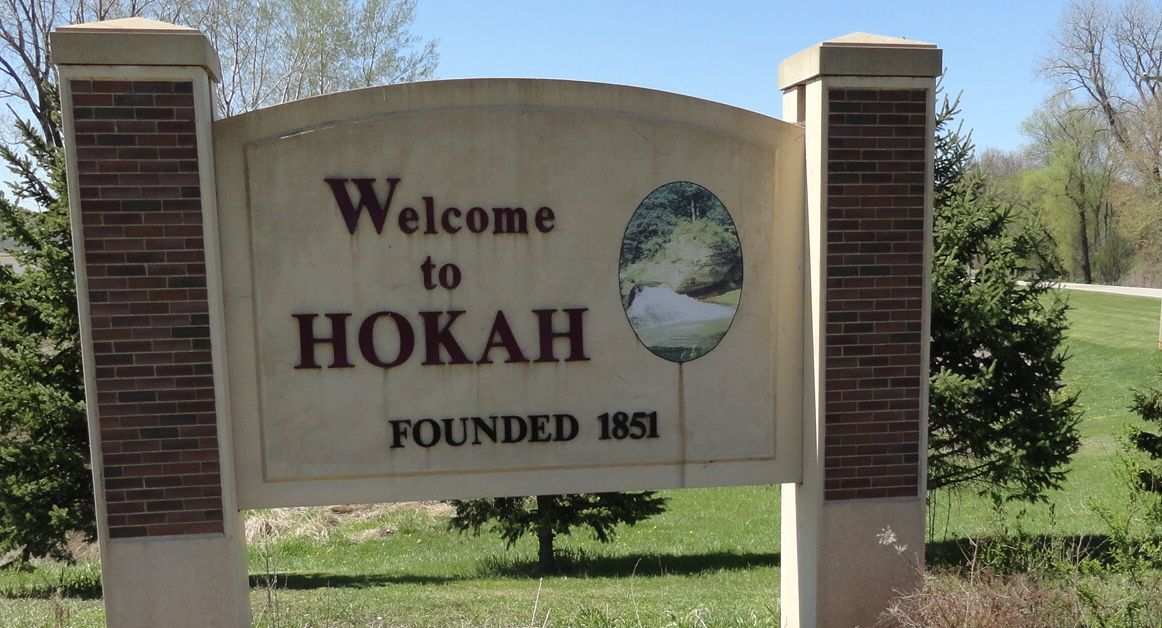
Welcome sign along state highway 16

Prior to the arrival of Europeans, the area that is now the city of Hokah was a Native American settlement of the Dakota people. The city's name, which is said to be a Native American word meaning gar fish or the Dakota name for the nearby Root River, derives from the chief of the settlement, Chief Wecheschatope Hokah. There were, at one time, more than thirty Indian mounds throughout the area including several effigy mounds, though most have been lost.

The first recorded European settler in Hokah was Edward Thompson, who arrived in 1851 with his wife and family and constructed a flour mill and dam on Thompson Creek, a tributary of the Root River that runs through the city and now bears his name. The first town meeting was held in 1858, and the town was officially incorporated into a village by the state of Minnesota on March 2, 1871.

By 1875, Hokah had several major industries including four flour mills, cooper shops and a railroad depot, driven by the city's location on the navigable Root River near where it empties into the Mississippi River as well as the Root River Valley Railroad which ran through the north end of the village from nearby La Crescent to Rochester, Minnesota. The railroad depot was equipped for all types of railroad work, including the construction of railroad locomotives and coaches. The depot employed as many as 500 workers and constructed as many as 300 coaches in one year. As of 1880, Hokah also had a plow factory, a furniture factory, three blacksmith shops, a shoe shop, two drug stores, and six general stores.

In 1876, a railroad bridge was constructed across the Mississippi River from La Crosse, connecting the Root River Valley Railroad to the railroads across the river in La Crosse. In 1880, the Root River Valley Railroad was purchased by the Chicago, Milwaukee, St. Paul and Pacific Railroad and the railroad depot in Hokah was razed in favor of other facilities elsewhere, leaving several hundred workers without employment and causing many people to leave the area. Hokah's other industries suffered from this loss of population and many of the other local businesses eventually closed.

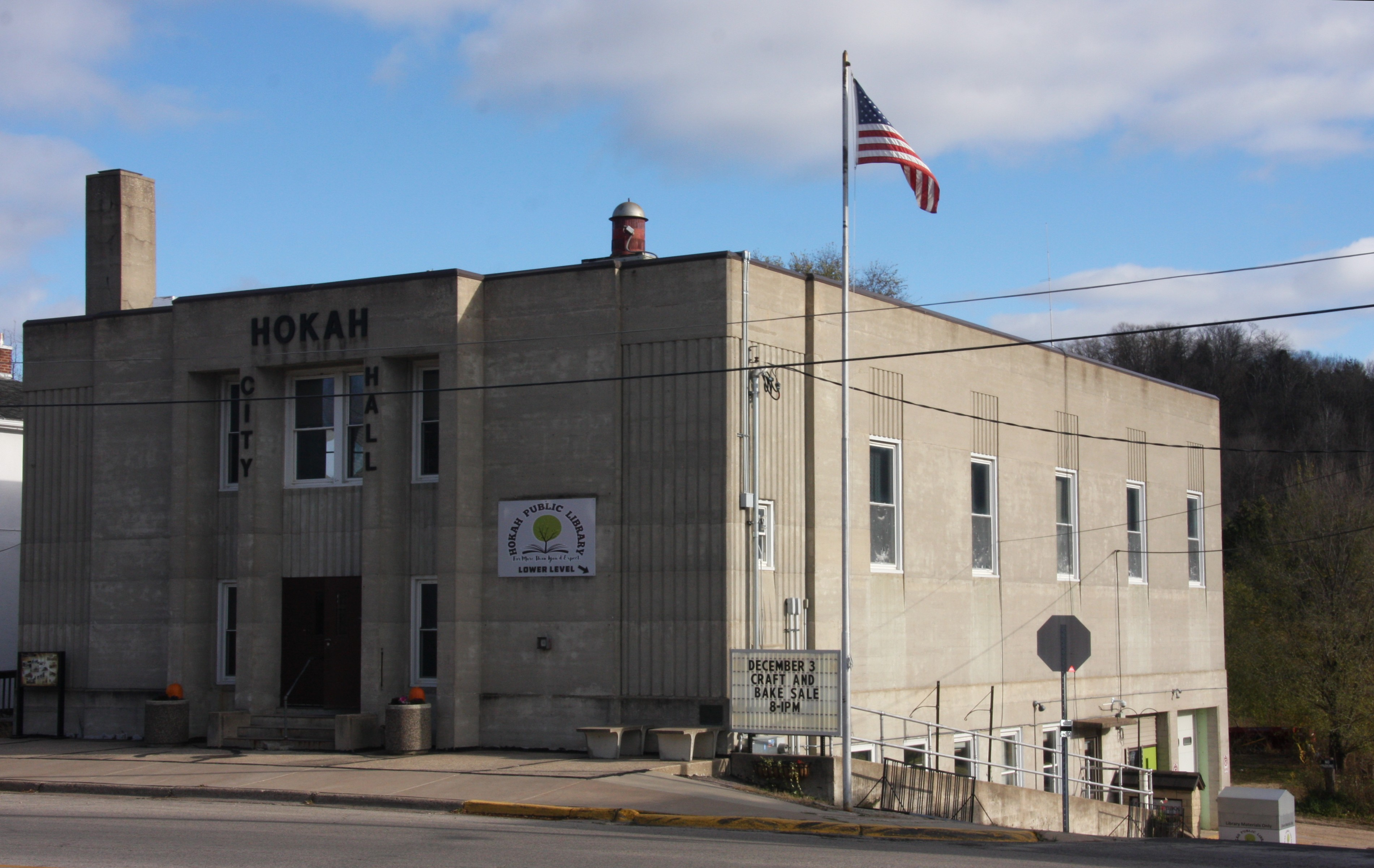
Former Hokah city hall, built in 1938 Now the Library

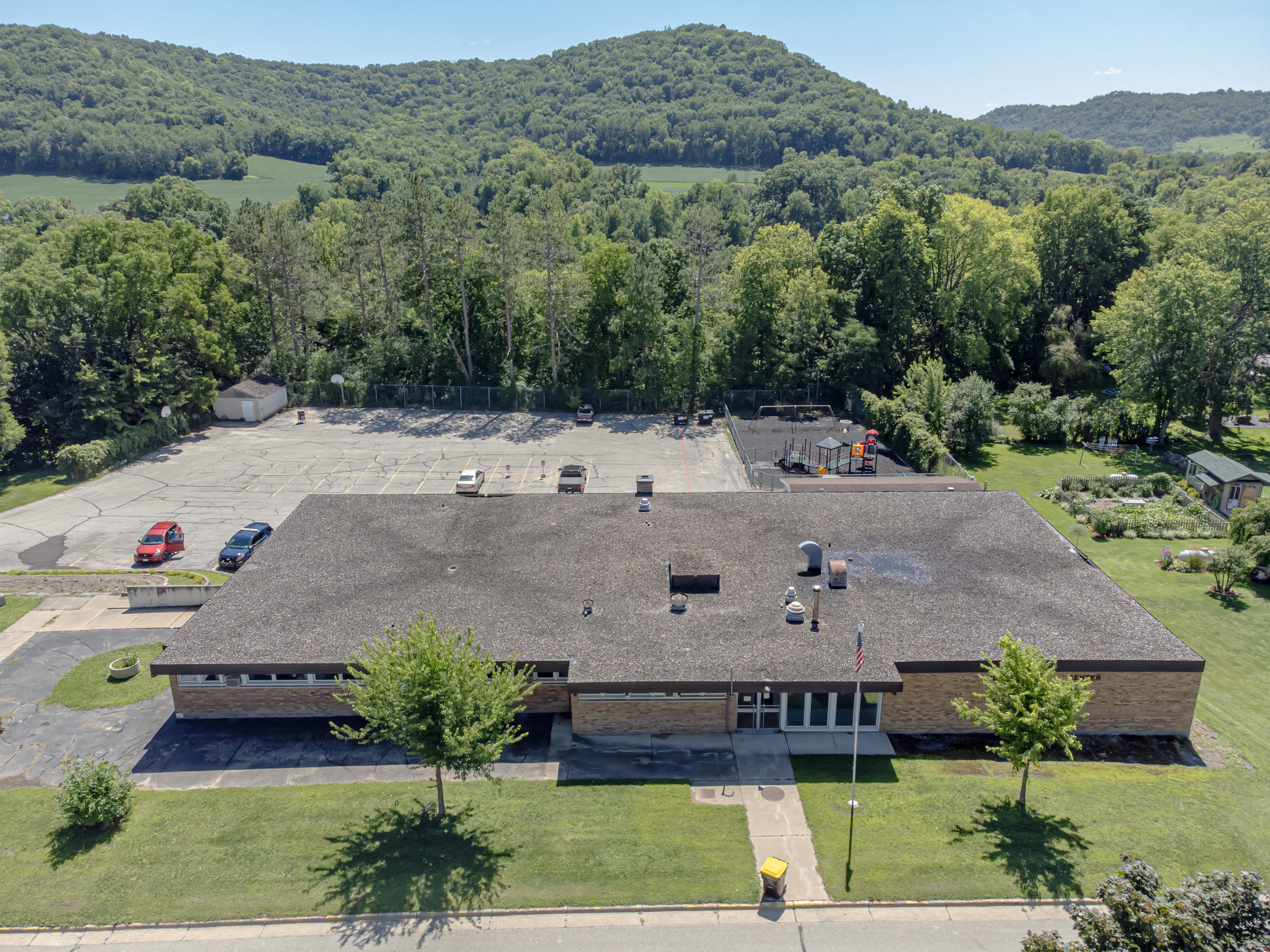
Hokah Administrative Center and police department

On April 23, 1923, the village was reincorporated as a city. Hokah City Hall, built by the Works Progress Administration in 1938, is listed on the National Register of Historic Places.

On August 19, 2007, 15.10 inches of rain fell in Hokah over a 24-hour period, breaking the previous 24-hour rainfall record for the state of Minnesota of 10.84 inches set on July 22, 1972 in Fort Ripley, Minnesota. This rainfall was part of the weather system that caused the 2007 Midwest flooding and caused widespread damage throughout Hokah and surrounding communities including landslides, damaged and destroyed homes, and washed-out roads. Hokah also holds the record for the most rainfall in any month for the state of Minnesota at 23.86 inches, also set in August, 2007.

== Geography ==
According to the United States Census Bureau, the city has a total area of 0.75 square miles (1.94 km^{2}), of which 0.73 square miles (1.89 km^{2}) is land and 0.02 square miles (0.05 km^{2}) is water.

Hokah's location in the Driftless Area of southeastern Minnesota gives it a hilly landscape dominated by high bluffs and low river valleys known as coulees. The city's downtown is set on a small bluff between the Root River valley and the Thompson Creek valley. At the east end of downtown is Thompson Bluff, also known as Mt. Tom, a bluff that rises more than 400 feet above downtown. Like Thompson Creek, Thompson Bluff is named for Edward Thompson.

=== Como Falls ===
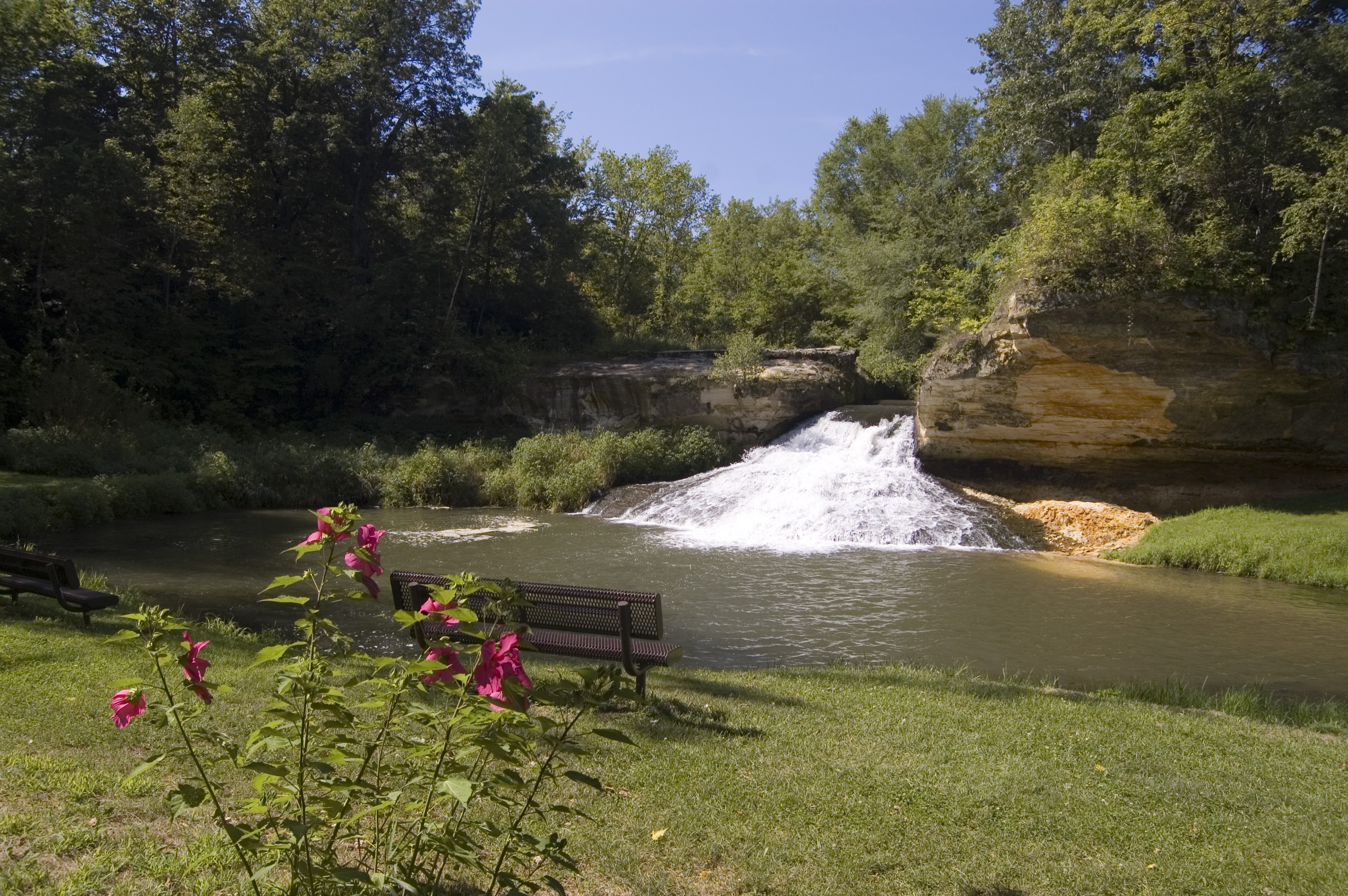
Modern-day Como Falls

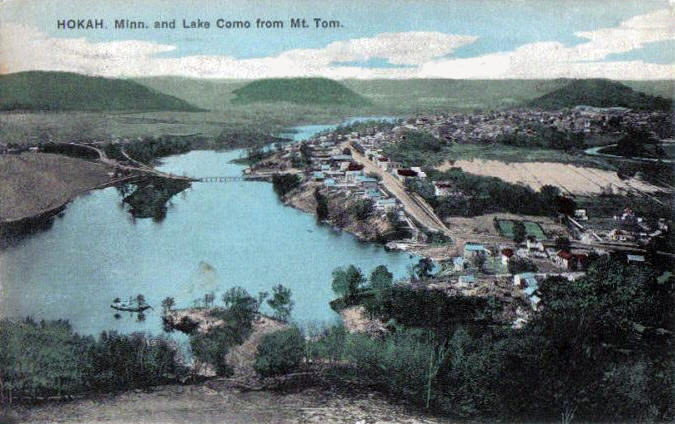
Postcard depicting Lake Como circa 1909

Como Falls in Hokah, Minnesota

Hokah was home to Como Falls, a waterfall on Thompson Creek. From 1858 until the 1930s Hokah was also home to Lake Como, a 90-acre, 20-foot deep man-made lake created by building a dam on Thompson Creek at Como Falls. Lake Como was a popular vacation spot in its heyday, drawing visitors from La Crosse and the surrounding area with lakeside cabins and boat rentals. The dam that created Lake Como failed during a flood in 1909 and allowed the lake to drain but was rebuilt in 1922. By the late 1930s, soil erosion from nearby farms prior to the widespread local use of contour plowing caused the lake bed to fill in, bringing about the end of Lake Como. Until August 2018, the site of Lake Como was used as a community park, pool, and baseball field. A severe storm in late August 2018 dumped almost eight inches of rain in the area in less than 24 hours, causing massive damage to the park and rerouting the path of water around the rock formation that made up Como Falls, basically destroying the falls. In the following months, local and state parties' funding was allocated to rebuilding the route for water that creates Como Falls.

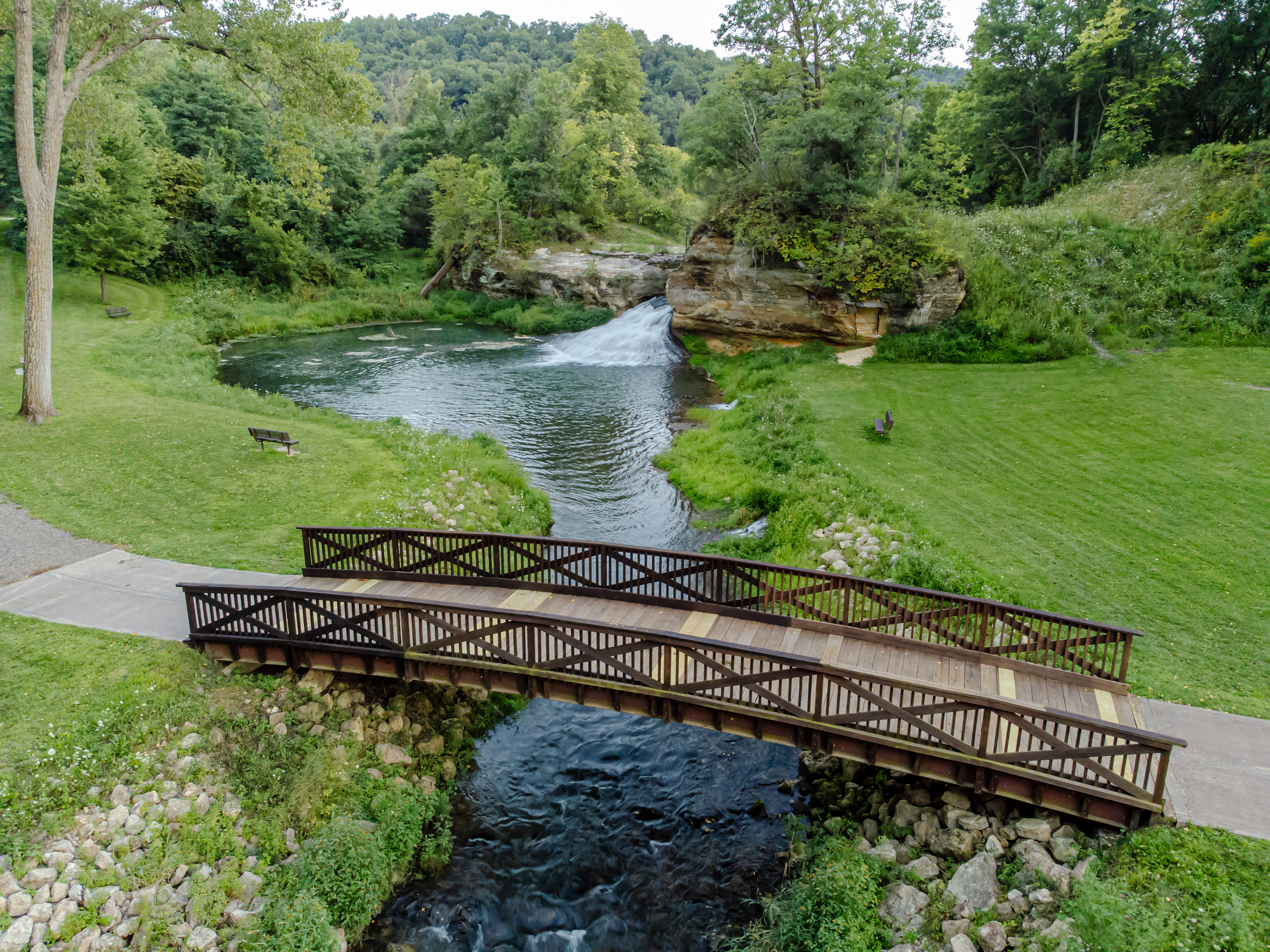
Como Falls in Hokah, Minnesota

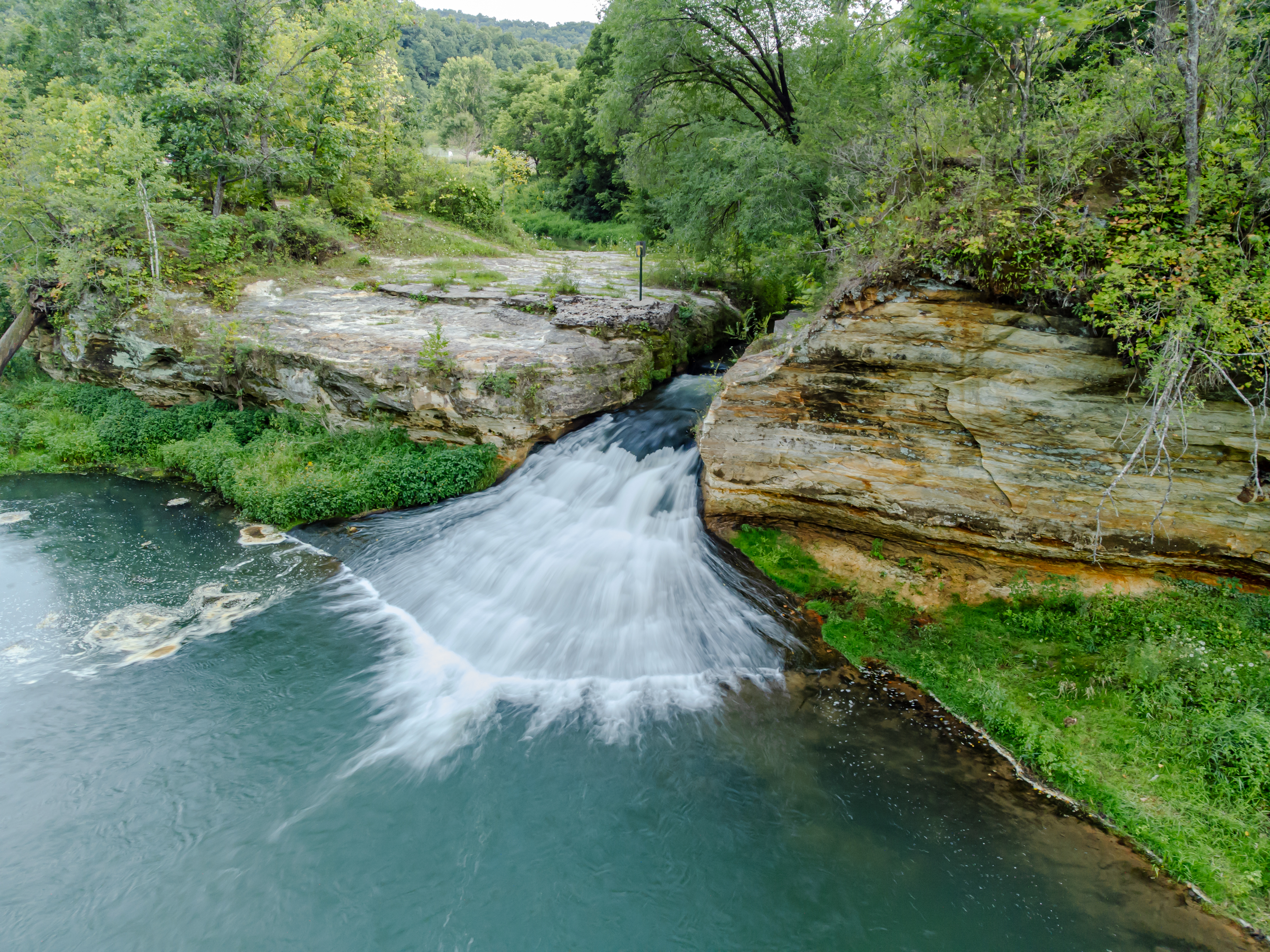
Como Falls

== Transportation ==
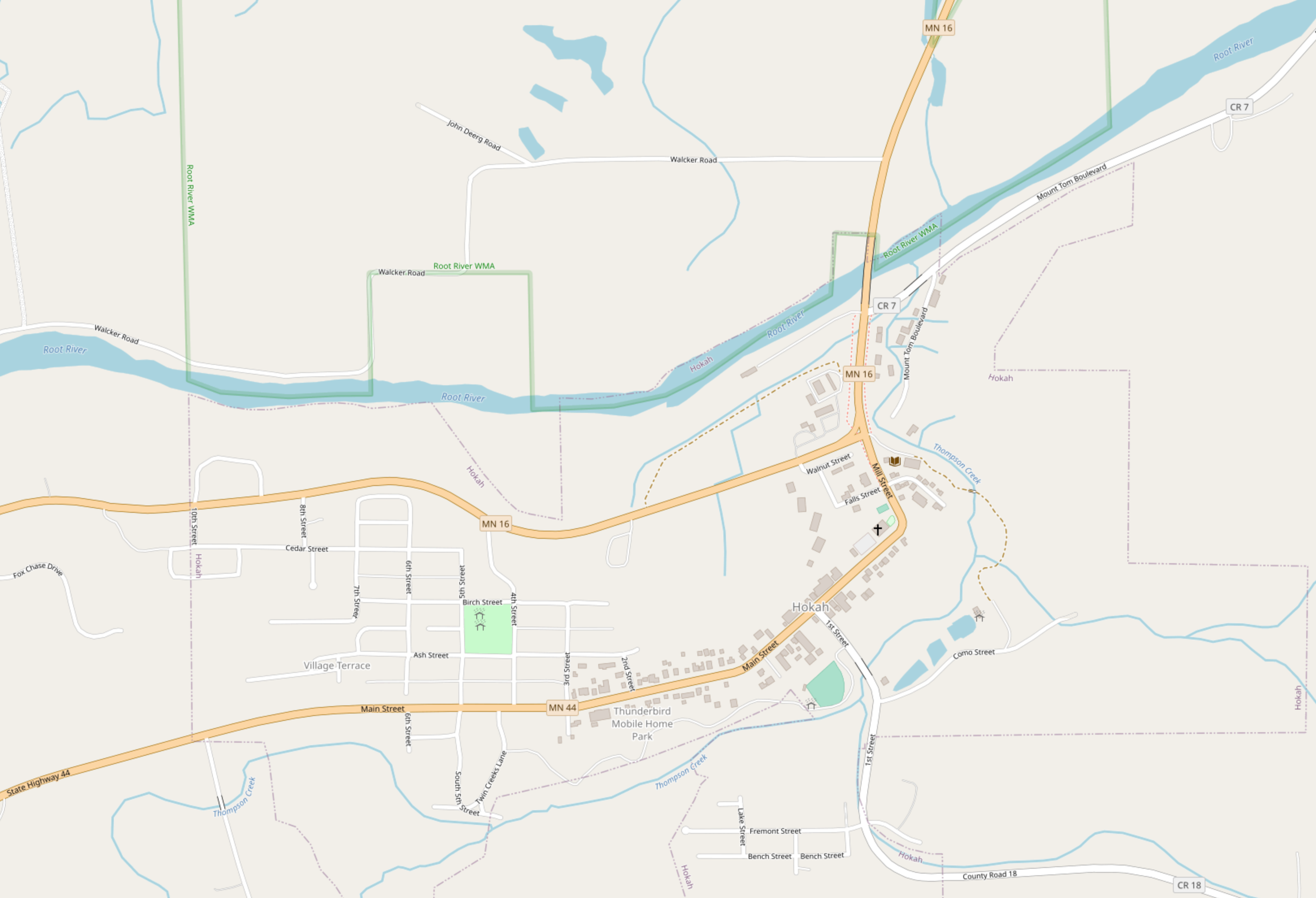
Hokah streets map

Hokah is located approximately six miles west-southwest of downtown La Crosse, Wisconsin, or about nine miles by automobile via the Mississippi River Bridge in La Crescent.

Minnesota State Highway 44 passes directly through downtown Hokah and has its northern terminus at an intersection with Minnesota State Highway 16 northeast of downtown. Minnesota State Highway 16 passes just north of downtown. Minnesota State Highway 26, which follows the Mississippi River and serves as part of the Great River Road, passes just to the east of Hokah.

Two nearby motor vehicle bridges span the Mississippi River and connect the southeastern corner of Minnesota to the La Crosse area in Wisconsin: six miles north of Hokah, the Mississippi River Bridge carries U.S. routes 14 and 61 and connects downtown La Crescent, Minnesota to downtown La Crosse, Wisconsin, and eight miles north of Hokah, the I-90 Mississippi River Bridge in Dresbach carries Interstate 90 across the Mississippi River to northern La Crosse and Onalaska, Wisconsin. South of Hokah, the nearest place for vehicles to cross the Mississippi River is at the Black Hawk Bridge, thirty miles away in Lansing, Iowa.

The nearby La Crosse Amtrak station provides daily service for the Empire Builder Amtrak route, and the La Crosse Regional Airport provides daily service to Chicago and Minneapolis via American Airlines and Delta Air Lines.

== Demographics ==
Historical population
Census	Pop.	Note	%±
1860	309		—
1870	525		69.9%
1880	961		83.0%
1890	582		−39.4%
1900	536		−7.9%
1910	400		−25.4%
1920	407		1.8%
1930	452		11.1%
1940	546		20.8%
1950	643		17.8%
1960	685		6.5%
1970	697		1.8%
1980	686		−1.6%
1990	687		0.1%
2000	614		−10.6%
2010	580		−5.5%
2020	553		−4.7%
U.S. Decennial Census

=== 2010 census ===
As of the census of 2010, there were 580 people, 275 households, and 152 families residing in the city. The population density was 794.5 inhabitants per square mile (306.8/km^{2}). There were 287 housing units at an average density of 393.2 per square mile (151.8/km^{2}). The racial makeup of the city was 96.6% White, 0.2% African American, 0.7% Native American, 0.3% from other races, and 2.2% from two or more races. Hispanic or Latino of any race were 1.4% of the population.

There were 275 households, of which 28.4% had children under the age of 18 living with them, 37.8% were married couples living together, 12.0% had a female householder with no husband present, 5.5% had a male householder with no wife present, and 44.7% were non-families. 38.5% of all households were made up of individuals, and 10.5% had someone living alone who was 65 years of age or older. The average household size was 2.11 and the average family size was 2.76.

The median age in the city was 39.4 years. 24% of residents were under the age of 18; 9% were between the ages of 18 and 24; 24.3% were from 25 to 44; 31.9% were from 45 to 64; and 11% were 65 years of age or older. The gender makeup of the city was 51.0% male and 49.0% female.

=== 2000 census ===
As of the census of 2000, there were 614 people, 271 households, and 159 families residing in the city. The population density was 860.1 inhabitants per square mile (332.1/km^{2}). There were 278 housing units at an average density of 389.4 per square mile (150.3/km^{2}). The racial makeup of the city was 98.37% White, 1.14% African American, 0.16% from other races, and 0.33% from two or more races. Hispanic or Latino of any race were 0.81% of the population.

There were 271 households, out of which 34.3% had children under the age of 18 living with them, 39.1% were married couples living together, 14.4% had a female householder with no husband present, and 41.3% were non-families. 35.1% of all households were made up of individuals, and 12.5% had someone living alone who was 65 years of age or older. The average household size was 2.27 and the average family size was 2.96.

In the city, the population was spread out, with 27.9% under the age of 18, 8.3% from 18 to 24, 31.1% from 25 to 44, 19.5% from 45 to 64, and 13.2% who were 65 years of age or older. The median age was 35 years. For every 100 females, there were 88.9 males. For every 100 females age 18 and over, there were 90.9 males.

The median income for a household in the city was $26,838, and the median income for a family was $36,000. Males had a median income of $32,212 versus $21,016 for females. The per capita income for the city was $15,630. About 16.5% of families and 15.5% of the population were below the poverty line, including 26.0% of those under age 18 and 8.3% of those age 65 or over.

== Notable people ==
- Herbert John Burgman, Nazi propagandist during World War II
- William H. Harries, U.S representative for Minnesota
- Clark W. Thompson, Minnesota state senator

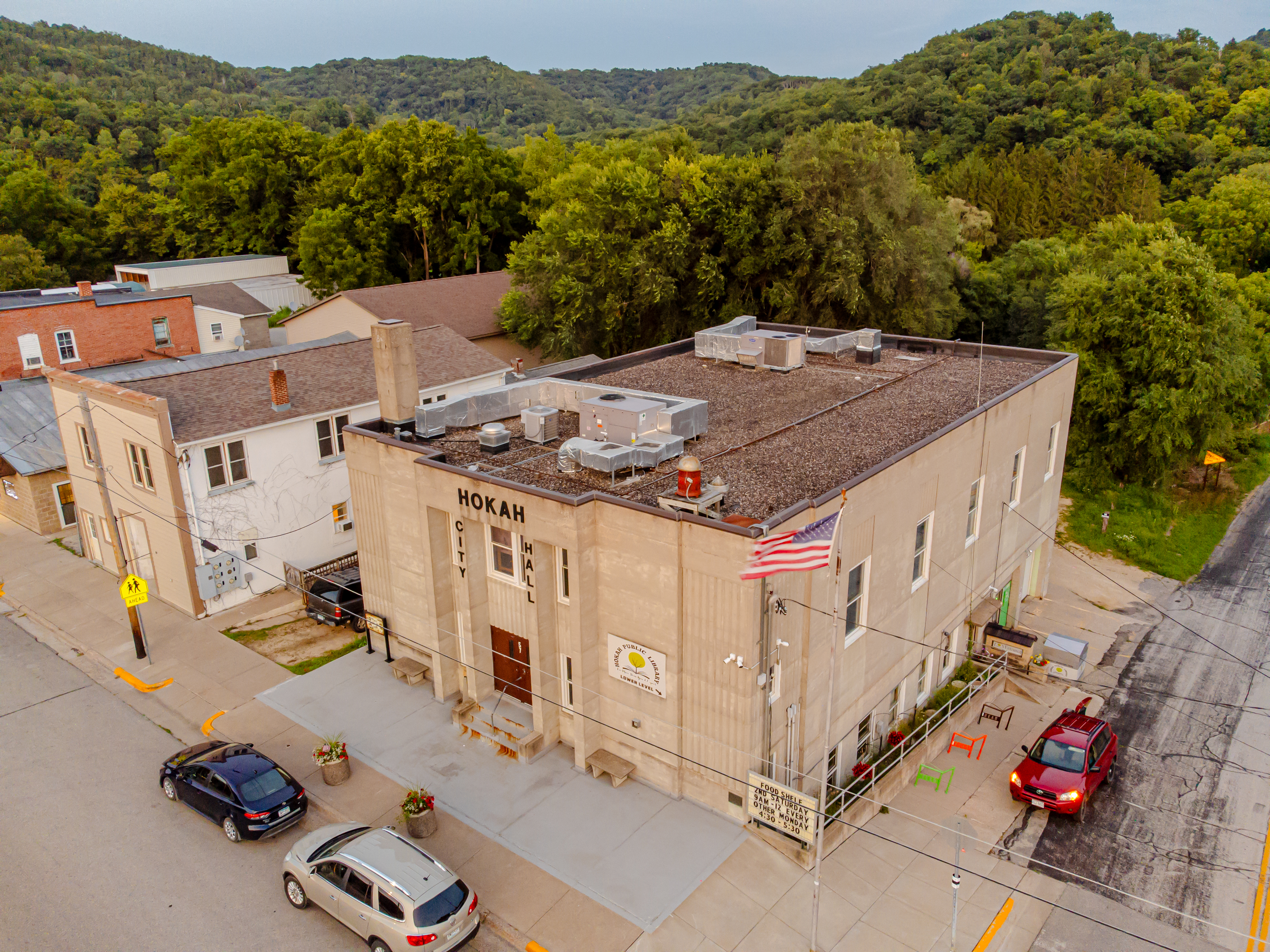
Former Hokah city hall Now the library

== Education ==
Hokah, the nearby community of La Crescent, and the surrounding area are served by the La Crescent-Hokah Public School District. St. Peter's School, a Catholic school serving pre-kindergarten through 8th grade, is also located in Hokah. Several universities, including the University of Wisconsin–La Crosse, Viterbo University, St. Mary's University of Minnesota, and Winona State University, are nearby.

The city's public library is the Hokah Public Library. The library is a member of Southeastern Libraries Cooperating (SELCO), one of Minnesota's twelve regional public library systems, which serves the southeastern portion of the state.

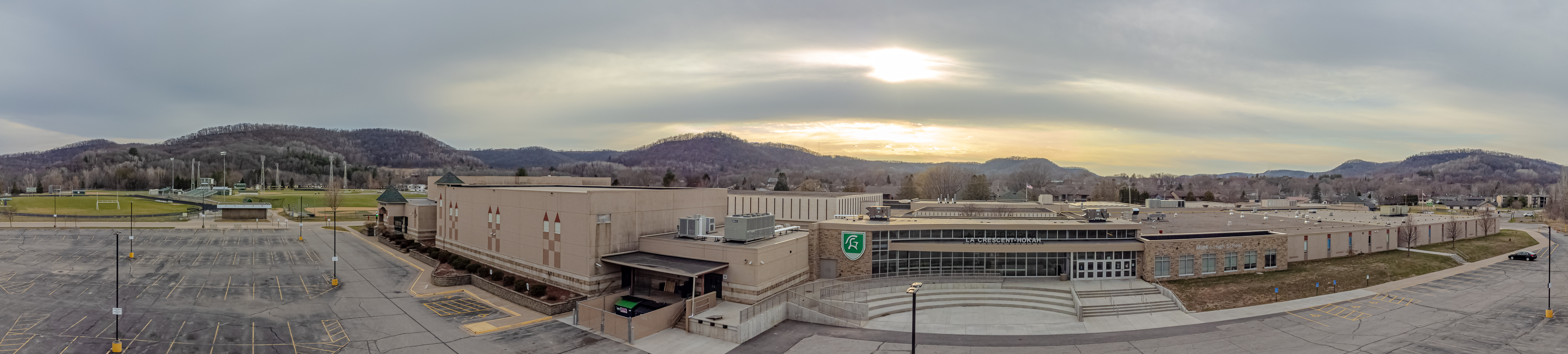
La Crescent-Hokah High School
