= Houston Township, Houston County, Minnesota =

Houston Township, Minnesota
- Township
- Location within the state of Minnesota Houston Township, Minnesota (the United States)
- Coordinates: 43°46′52″N 91°33′10″W
- Country: United States
- State: Minnesota
- County: Houston

Area
  - Total: 33.6 sq mi (86.9 km^{2})
  - Land: 33.3 sq mi (86.2 km^{2})
  - Water: 0.27 sq mi (0.7 km^{2})
- Elevation: 751 ft (229 m)

Population (2000)
  - Total: 438
  - Density: 13/sq mi (5.1/km^{2})
- Time zone: UTC-6 (Central (CST))
  - Summer (DST): UTC-5 (CDT)
- ZIP code: 55943
- Area code: 507
- FIPS code: 27-30248
- GNIS feature ID: 0664522

Houston Township is a township in Houston County, Minnesota, United States. The population was 438 at the 2000 census.

Houston Township was organized in 1858, and named for Samuel Houston, as was Houston County.

== Geography ==
According to the United States Census Bureau, the township has a total area of 33.5 square miles (87 km^{2}), of which 33.3 square miles (86 km^{2}) is land and 0.3 square miles (0.78 km^{2}) (0.81%) is water.

== Demographics ==
As of the census of 2000, there were 438 people, 162 households, and 127 families residing in the township. The population density was 13.2 inhabitants per square mile (5.1/km^{2}). There were 177 housing units at an average density of 5.3 per square mile (2.0/km^{2}). The racial makeup of the township was 98.17% White, 1.14% Native American, 0.23% Pacific Islander, and 0.46% from two or more races. Hispanic or Latino of any race were 0.23% of the population.

There were 162 households, out of which 40.1% had children under the age of 18 living with them, 69.8% were married couples living together, 4.3% had a female householder with no husband present, and 21.6% were non-families. 16.0% of all households were made up of individuals, and 5.6% had someone living alone who was 65 years of age or older. The average household size was 2.70 and the average family size was 3.01.

In the township the population was spread out, with 28.1% under the age of 18, 6.6% from 18 to 24, 28.3% from 25 to 44, 25.1% from 45 to 64, and 11.9% who were 65 years of age or older. The median age was 39 years. For every 100 females, there were 99.1 males. For every 100 females age 18 and over, there were 103.2 males.

The median income for a household in the township was $42,000, and the median income for a family was $48,594. Males had a median income of $27,500 versus $21,250 for females. The per capita income for the township was $18,933. About 7.4% of families and 7.3% of the population were below the poverty line, including 6.8% of those under age 18 and none of those age 65 or over.
