= Caledonia Township, Houston County, Minnesota =

Caledonia Township, Minnesota
- Township
- Location within the state of Minnesota Caledonia Township, Minnesota (the United States)
- Coordinates: 43°38′18″N 91°32′29″W
- Country: United States
- State: Minnesota
- County: Houston

Area
  - Total: 33.8 sq mi (87.6 km^{2})
  - Land: 33.8 sq mi (87.6 km^{2})
  - Water: 0 sq mi (0.0 km^{2})
- Elevation: 1,037 ft (316 m)

Population (2000)
  - Total: 625
  - Density: 18/sq mi (7.1/km^{2})
- Time zone: UTC-6 (Central (CST))
  - Summer (DST): UTC-5 (CDT)
- ZIP code: 55921
- Area code: 507
- FIPS code: 27-09244
- GNIS feature ID: 0663725

Caledonia Township is a township in Houston County, Minnesota, United States. The population was 625 at the 2000 census.

== History ==
Caledonia Township was organized in 1858, and named after its largest settlement, Caledonia.

== Geography ==
According to the United States Census Bureau, the township has a total area of 33.8 square miles (88 km^{2}), all but 0.03% of which is water.

== Demographics ==
As of the census of 2000, there were 625 people, 194 households, and 169 families residing in the township. The population density was 18.5 inhabitants per square mile (7.1/km^{2}). There were 205 housing units at an average density of 6.1 per square mile (2.4/km^{2}). The racial makeup of the township was 98.56% White, 1.44% from other races. Hispanic or Latino of any race were 1.76% of the population.

There were 194 households, out of which 46.4% had children under the age of 18 living with them, 79.9% were married couples living together, 4.1% had a female householder with no husband present, and 12.4% were non-families. 8.2% of all households were made up of individuals, and 3.6% had someone living alone who was 65 years of age or older. The average household size was 3.22 and the average family size was 3.45.

In the township the population was spread out, with 34.6% under the age of 18, 7.2% from 18 to 24, 22.9% from 25 to 44, 25.1% from 45 to 64, and 10.2% who were 65 years of age or older. The median age was 36 years. For every 100 females, there were 111.1 males. For every 100 females age 18 and over, there were 106.6 males.

The median income for a household in the township was $53,056, and the median income for a family was $59,167. Males had a median income of $36,442 versus $21,125 for females. The per capita income for the township was $18,372. About 4.7% of families and 7.6% of the population were below the poverty line, including 13.9% of those under age 18 and 4.4% of those age 65 or over.
