= Brownsville, Minnesota =

City in Minnesota, United States

Brownsville
- City
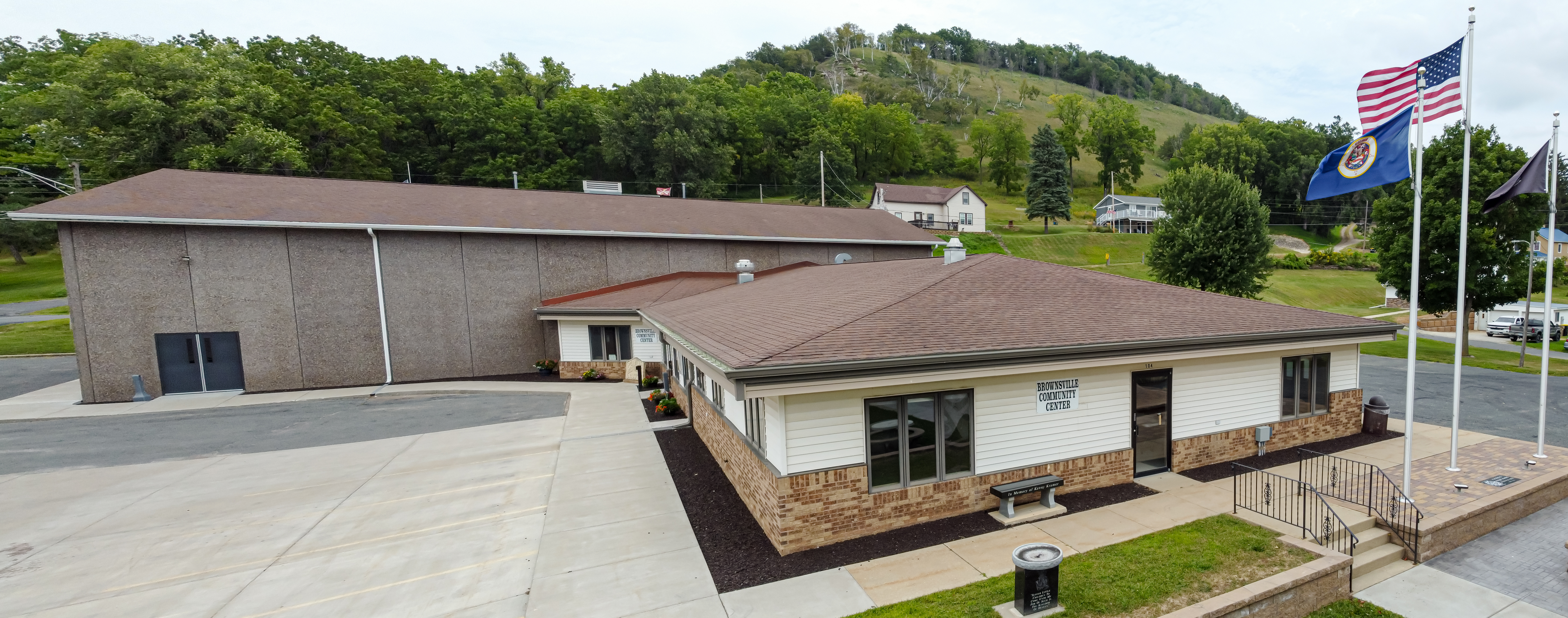
- City hall

- Location of Brownsville, Minnesota
- Coordinates: 43°41′57″N 91°16′56″W
- Country: United States
- State: Minnesota
- County: Houston

Area
  - Total: 1.85 sq mi (4.79 km^{2})
  - Land: 1.85 sq mi (4.79 km^{2})
  - Water: 0 sq mi (0.00 km^{2})
- Elevation: 712 ft (217 m)

Population (2020)
  - Total: 566
  - Density: 306.1/sq mi (118.19/km^{2})
- Time zone: UTC-6 (Central (CST))
  - Summer (DST): UTC-5 (CDT)
- ZIP code: 55919
- Area code: 507
- FIPS code: 27-08218
- GNIS feature ID: 2393441
- Website: www.brownsvillemn.gov

Brownsville is a city in Houston County, Minnesota, United States. The population was 566 at the 2020 census.

== History ==
A post office called Brownsville has been in operation since 1852. Brownsville was platted in 1854 by the brothers Job and Charles Brown, and named for them.

The village of Brownsville was destroyed by fire in October 1920. The loss was reported to be worth $75,000. The rail depot and eight other buildings were destroyed.

The weekly Brownsville News newspaper, established in June 1885, ceased publication in October 1920. It was issued with the Houston County Chief from November 1920 to April 1927 and with the Hokah Chief from April to July 1927.

== Geography ==
According to the United States Census Bureau, the city has a total area of 1.94 square miles (5.02 km^{2}), of which 1.75 square miles (4.53 km^{2}) is land and 0.19 square miles (0.49 km^{2}) is water.

Minnesota State Highway 26 and County Road 3 (Main Street) are two of the main routes in the community.

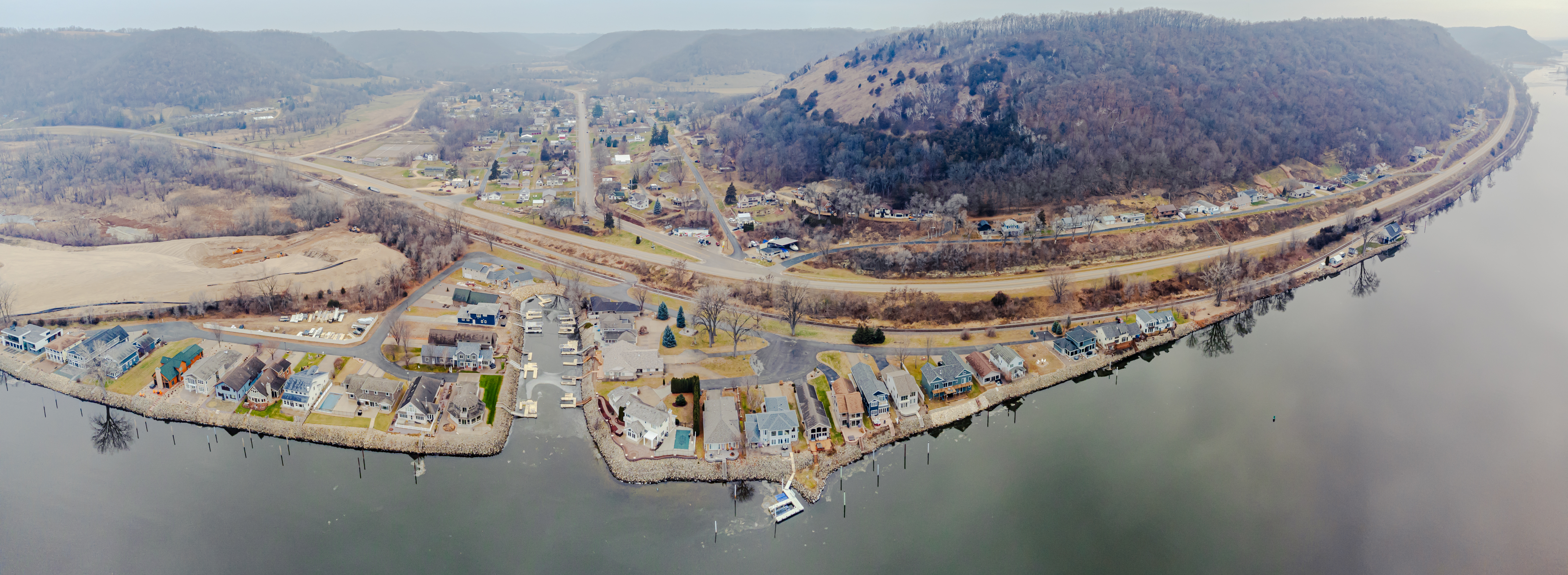

== Demographics ==
Historical population
Census	Pop.	Note	%±
1870	625		—
1880	607		−2.9%
1890	447		−26.4%
1900	453		1.3%
1910	361		−20.3%
1920	338		−6.4%
1930	274		−18.9%
1940	298		8.8%
1950	330		10.7%
1960	382		15.8%
1970	417		9.2%
1980	418		0.2%
1990	415		−0.7%
2000	517		24.6%
2010	466		−9.9%
2020	566		21.5%
U.S. Decennial Census

=== 2010 census ===
As of the census of 2010, there were 466 people, 213 households, and 137 families living in the city. The population density was 266.3 inhabitants per square mile (102.8/km^{2}). There were 280 housing units at an average density of 160.0 per square mile (61.8/km^{2}). The racial makeup of the city was 99.1% White and 0.9% from two or more races. Hispanic or Latino of any race were 0.9% of the population.

There were 213 households, of which 20.7% had children under the age of 18 living with them, 55.9% were married couples living together, 7.0% had a female householder with no husband present, 1.4% had a male householder with no wife present, and 35.7% were non-families. 27.2% of all households were made up of individuals, and 10.3% had someone living alone who was 65 years of age or older. The average household size was 2.19 and the average family size was 2.62.

The median age in the city was 47.6 years. 17% of residents were under the age of 18; 6.7% were between the ages of 18 and 24; 20.8% were from 25 to 44; 40.3% were from 45 to 64; and 15.2% were 65 years of age or older. The gender makeup of the city was 52.1% male and 47.9% female.

=== 2000 census ===
As of the census of 2000, there were 517 people, 216 households, and 149 families living in the city. The population density was 288.9 inhabitants per square mile (111.5/km^{2}). There were 273 housing units at an average density of 152.6 per square mile (58.9/km^{2}). The racial makeup of the city was 99.42% White, 0.39% Native American, and 0.19% from two or more races. Hispanic or Latino of any race were 0.58% of the population.

There were 216 households, out of which 31.5% had children under the age of 18 living with them, 59.3% were married couples living together, 5.6% had a female householder with no husband present, and 31.0% were non-families. 25.5% of all households were made up of individuals, and 12.0% had someone living alone who was 65 years of age or older. The average household size was 2.39 and the average family size was 2.91.

In the city, the population was spread out, with 23.2% under the age of 18, 6.6% from 18 to 24, 29.4% from 25 to 44, 27.1% from 45 to 64, and 13.7% who were 65 years of age or older. The median age was 41 years. For every 100 females, there were 112.8 males. For every 100 females age 18 and over, there were 100.5 males.

The median income for a household in the city was $46,250, and the median income for a family was $51,875. Males had a median income of $32,426 versus $26,429 for females. The per capita income for the city was $20,442. About 1.5% of families and 3.5% of the population were below the poverty line, including 4.7% of those under age 18 and 9.4% of those age 65 or over.

== Transportation ==
Passenger train service was provided to Brownsville throughout its early history. Trains ran from La Crosse along the west bank of the Mississippi River through Brownsville to Dubuque. This service gradually decreased in the first half of the twentieth century and was discontinued on June 8, 1951.

== Notable people ==
- The film actor William Hauber (1891–1929) was born in Brownsville.
- Peshtigo fire survivor and memoirist Peter Pernin was Catholic pastor in Brownsville 1886-94.
