= Greg Davids =

American politician (born 1958)

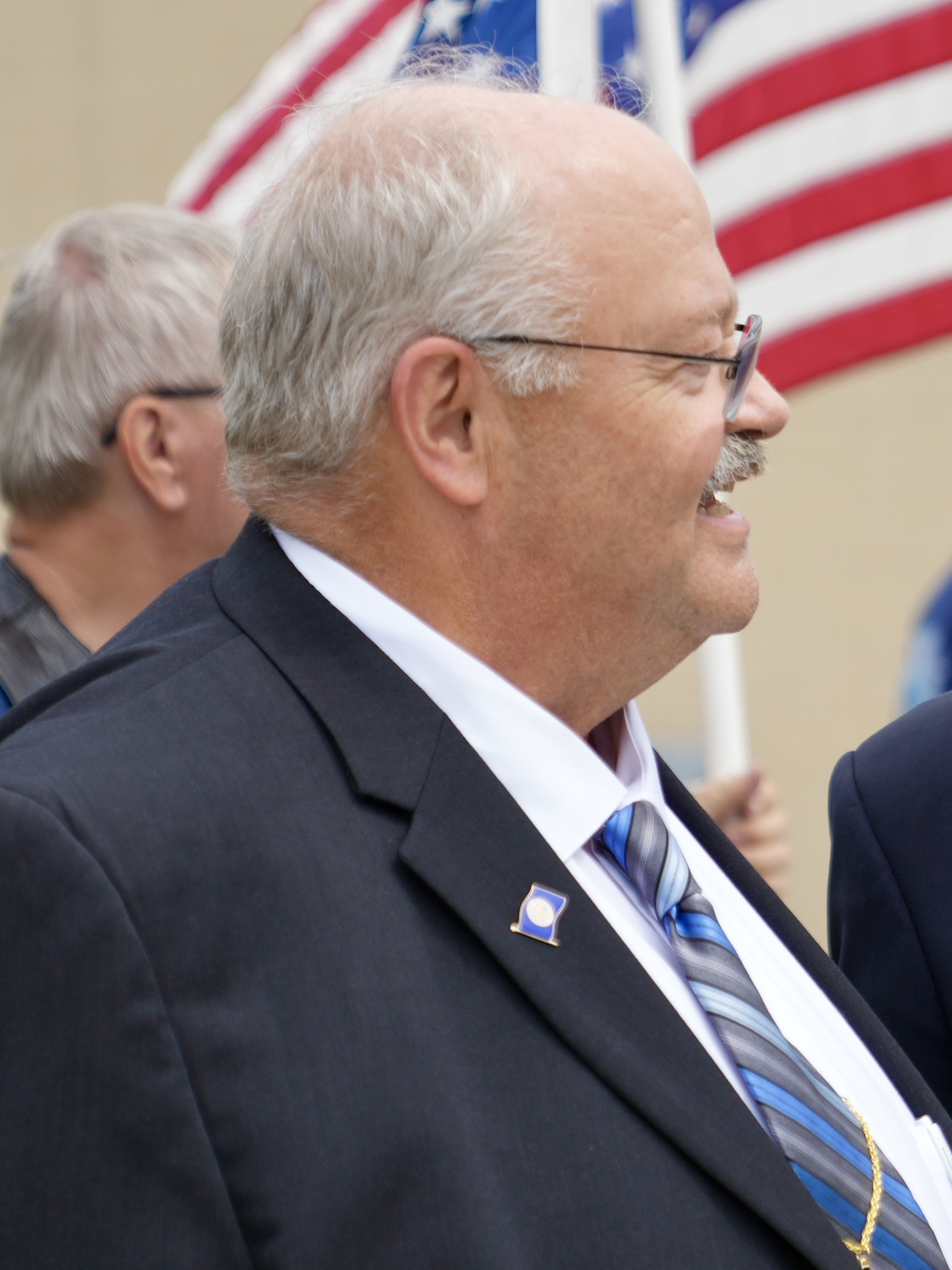
- Davids in 2024

Member of the Minnesota House of Representatives
- Incumbent
- Assumed office January 6, 2009
- Preceded by: Ken Tschumper
- Constituency: District 26B (2023–present); District 28B (2013–2023); District 31B (2009–2013)
- In office February 18, 1991 – January 2, 2007
- Preceded by: Elton Redalen
- Succeeded by: Ken Tschumper
- Constituency: District 31B (1993–2007); District 32B (1991–1993)

Personal details
- Born: August 28, 1958 (age 68)
- Party: Republican
- Spouse: Bonnie
- Children: 3
- Education: Waldorf College; Winona State University (B.S.); Minnesota State University, Mankato
- Occupation: Insurance agent; Business owner; Educator; Legislator
- Website: Government website

Gregory Michael Davids (born August 28, 1958) is an American politician serving in the Minnesota House of Representatives since 2009, and from 1991 to 2006. A member of the Republican Party of Minnesota, Davids represents District 26B in southeastern Minnesota, which includes the cities of La Crescent and Spring Valley, and parts of Fillmore, Houston, and Mower Counties.

== Early life, education, and career ==
Davids graduated from Spring Valley High School, then attended Waldorf College in Forest City, Iowa, and Winona State University in Winona, where he earned his B.S. in social science. He also attended graduate school at Mankato State University in Mankato.

Davids was appointed to the Preston City Council in 1986, and was elected mayor a year later, serving until his election to the state legislature in 1991.

== Minnesota House of Representatives ==
Davids was elected to the Minnesota House of Representatives in a special election on February 12, 1991. He won a full term in 1992 and was reelected every two years until 2006. Davids first ran after eight-term Republican incumbent Elton Redalen resigned to accept an appointment as Minnesota's Commissioner of Agriculture. In 2006, Davids was defeated by Ken Tschumper. Davids ran again and defeated Tschumper in 2008, and has been reelected every two years since then. He is the longest-serving Republican member of the Minnesota House, serving 16 non-consecutive terms.

Davids serves as the minority lead for the Taxes Committee, and sits on the Ethics and Higher Education Finance and Policy Committees. He chaired the Taxes Committee for six years of non-consecutive Republican control, from 2011 to 2012 and from 2015 to 2018. During the 2005-06 biennium, he chaired the Agriculture and Rural Development Committee. That session he also served as speaker pro tempore for the House, a position he also held during the 2011-12 biennium. From 1999 to 2004, Davids chaired the Commerce, Jobs and Economic Development Committee.

=== Taxes ===
Davids has consistently advocated for tax cuts for businesses and individuals, and called for Minnesota to make its tax code more competitive with other Midwestern states. He has supported a full repeal of the tax on Social Security, and an end to the estate tax.

From 2011 to 2012, Davids chaired the taxes committee during a budget stalemate between House and Senate Republicans and Governor Mark Dayton that resulted in a government shutdown. In 2014, during full DFL control of the legislature, he supported a tax bill providing $103 million in tax cuts.

Returning as tax chair in 2015, Davids authored bipartisan legislation in 2015 to align the state's tax code with federal law, delivering tax relief to filers. He opposed efforts by Dayton to increase the gas tax and taxes on top earners, and called for phasing out commercial property taxes. He supported bipartisan efforts to give tax credits to Minnesotans with student debt. In 2016, Davids sponsored a tax bill that would give $450 million in cuts to Social Security recipients, veterans, college students and parents, a compromise version was passed later in the session with bipartisan support but was not signed by Governor Dayton. The bill also contained a repeal of yearly tax increases on tobacco and cigarettes, which Davids supported but Dayton opposed.

Davids praised parts of Dayton's 2017 tax plan, but opposed a proposal to create a working family tax credit in favor of a child-care tax credit. Davids's 2017 tax bill, which passed the House, contained $1.35 billion in tax cuts, including many provisions from the 2016 bill, including cuts to estate taxes and a repeal of the tobacco tax. Dayton signed the bill but called for a special session to undo several of the cuts that he argued favored the wealthy and special interest groups. In 2018, Davids wrote another tax bill that offered tax cuts for over 2 million Minnesotans, which passed on a bipartisan vote, but was criticized by some DFLers for prioritizing corporate tax breaks.

=== Health care policy and MNsure ===
Davids has been critical of the Affordable Care Act as well as MNsure, a state-run health insurance marketplace. He supported efforts to eliminate MNsure, and praised President Donald Trump for his promise to repeal the ACA.

Davids co-chaired a legislative oversight committee on MNsure, and advocated for high-risk pools. He has said he does not want more people on public programs, instead saying "there should be a viable, vibrant private market". Davids authored a bill establishing a reinsurance program, but opposed funding it with tax increases on the health care industry. In 2017, he criticized House DFLers for holding up a Republican health insurance rebate proposal.

=== Other political positions ===
Davids wrote a letter opposing Dayton's southwest light rail plan, arguing it would take funds away from tax relief and other transportation projects in Greater Minnesota. He opposed Dayton's efforts to raise cabinet members' salaries. Davids opposed efforts to expand gambling through online ticket sales. He also opposed legislation lifting a state ban on Sunday liquor sales.

In 2017, Davids called then-minority leader Melissa Hortman racist for her calling out her "100 percent white male" colleagues for playing cards in the retiring room of the House during debate. He said Hortman should apologize or resign as DFL leader.

== Electoral history ==
1991 Minnesota State House - District 32B Special Election
Party	Candidate	Votes	%
Republican	Gregory Davids	3,369	62.66
Democratic (DFL)	Harlin Taylor	1,929	35.88
Write-in		42	0.07
Total votes		5,376	100
Republican hold			

1992 Minnesota State House - District 31B
Party	Candidate	Votes	%
Republican	Gregory Davids (incumbent)	14,174	98.38
Write-in		234	1.62
Total votes		14,408	100
Republican hold			

1994 Minnesota State House - District 31B
Party	Candidate	Votes	%
Republican	Gregory Davids (incumbent)	10,615	98.35
Write-in		179	1.65
Total votes		10,794	100
Republican hold			

1996 Minnesota State House - District 31B
Party	Candidate	Votes	%
Republican	Gregory Davids (incumbent)	9,152	60.61
Democratic (DFL)	Delbert Mandelko	5,929	39.27
Write-in		17	0.01
Total votes		15,098	100
Republican hold			

1998 Minnesota State House - District 31B
Party	Candidate	Votes	%
Republican	Gregory Davids (incumbent)	8,267	60.12
Democratic (DFL)	Delbert Mandelko	5,470	39.78
Write-in		13	0.01
Total votes		13,750	100
Republican hold			

2000 Minnesota State House - District 31B
Party	Candidate	Votes	%
Republican	Gregory Davids (incumbent)	9,586	59.47
Democratic (DFL)	Al Hein	6,533	40.53
Total votes		16,119	100
Republican hold			

2002 Minnesota State House - District 31B
Party	Candidate	Votes	%
Republican	Gregory Davids (incumbent)	8,475	53.45
Democratic (DFL)	Al Hein	7,363	46.43
Write-in		19	0.12
Total votes		15,857	100
Republican hold			

2004 Minnesota State House - District 31B
Party	Candidate	Votes	%
Republican	Gregory Davids (incumbent)	10,349	52.07
Democratic (DFL)	Peggy Hanson	9,435	47.47
Write-in		91	0.46
Total votes		19,875	100
Republican hold			

2006 Minnesota State House - District 31B
Party	Candidate	Votes	%
Democratic (DFL)	Ken Tschumper	8,063	50.02
Republican	Gregory Davids (incumbent)	8,011	49.69
Write-in		47	0.29
Total votes		16,121	100
Democratic (DFL) gain from Republican			

2008 Minnesota State House - District 31B
Party	Candidate	Votes	%
Republican	Gregory Davids	9,873	50.90
Democratic (DFL)	Ken Tschumper (incumbent)	9,466	48.81
Write-in		56	0.29
Total votes		19,395	100
Republican gain from Democratic (DFL)			

2010 Minnesota State House - District 31B
Party	Candidate	Votes	%
Republican	Gregory Davids (incumbent)	7,694	53.49
Democratic (DFL)	Steve Kemp	4,279	29.75
Independent	Al Hein	2,398	16.67
Write-in		13	0.09
Total votes		14,384	100
Republican hold			

2012 Minnesota State House - District 28B
Party	Candidate	Votes	%
Republican	Gregory Davids (incumbent)	12,006	58.22
Democratic (DFL)	Ken Tschumper	8,542	41.42
Write-in		74	0.36
Total votes		20,662	100
Republican hold			

2014 Minnesota State House - District 28B
Party	Candidate	Votes	%
Republican	Gregory Davids (incumbent)	9,013	55.88
Democratic (DFL)	Jon Pieper	7,090	43.96
Write-in		27	0.17
Total votes		16,130	100
Republican hold			

2016 Minnesota State House - District 28B
Party	Candidate	Votes	%
Republican	Gregory Davids (incumbent)	11,614	54.54
Democratic (DFL)	Thomas Trehus	9,651	45.32
Write-in		28	0.13
Total votes		21,293	100
Republican hold			

2018 Minnesota State House - District 28B
Party	Candidate	Votes	%
Republican	Gregory Davids (incumbent)	10,351	55.44
Democratic (DFL)	Thomas Trehus	8,308	44.49
Write-in		13	0.07
Total votes		18,672	100
Republican hold			

2020 Minnesota State House - District 28B
Party	Candidate	Votes	%
Republican	Gregory Davids (incumbent)	14,711	63.67
Democratic (DFL)	Jordan Fontenello	8,344	36.11
Write-in		49	0.21
Total votes		23,104	100
Republican hold			

2022 Minnesota State House - District 26B
Party	Candidate	Votes	%
Republican	Gregory Davids (incumbent)	15,037	94.67
Write-in		847	5.33
Total votes		15,884	100
Republican hold			

2024 Minnesota State House Republican Primary - District 26B
Party	Candidate	Votes	%
Republican	Greg Davids (Incumbent)	1,933	52.73
Republican	Gary Steuart	1,733	47.27
Total votes		3,666	100.0

2024 Minnesota State House - District 26B
Party	Candidate	Votes	%
Republican	Gregory Davids (incumbent)	15,714	63.32
Democratic (DFL)	Allie Wolf	9,044	36.44
Write-in		59	0.24
Total votes		24,817	100
Republican hold			

== Personal life ==
Davids lives in Preston Minnesota with his wife, Bonnie, and has three children.
