= Catherine Backus =

American sculptor (1863–1955)

Catherine F. Backus
- Born: Catherine Fallis; September 21, 1863; Attica, Indiana, U.S.
- Died: July 29, 1955 (aged 91); Miami, Florida, U.S.
- Resting place: Woodlawn Park North Cemetery and Mausoleum
- Known for: Sculpture
- Spouse: George J. Backus (1894–1944)

Catherine Fallis Backus (1863–1955) was an American sculptor. She created several commemorative bronze statues and busts from the 1890s through the first decade of the 20th century. She is perhaps most well known for creating a statue of William J. Colvill for the rotunda of the Minnesota State Capitol.

Backus was a student at the Minneapolis School of Fine Arts and studied under sculptor Lorado Taft at the School of the Art Institute of Chicago. During her career she created a statue of the ferryman Captain John Tapper, a tablet depicting horticulturalist John S. Harris, a bas-relief portrait of poet Arthur Upson, and busts of missionary Joseph W. Hancock and Reverend H. M. Simmons. After 1911, she moved to Florida with her family where she undertook large-scale flower gardening.

== Early life, family and education ==
Catherine R. Fallis was born on September 21, 1863, in Attica, Indiana, to Martha and John Fallis, a miller. Her family were said to be Quakers of English descent and she had four older siblings, Edward, Ida, James, and Harry.

Her parents moved to Minneapolis, Minnesota, in 1889, and died shortly thereafter. She married George Joseph Backus, a lumberman, on February 14, 1894. They lived in Minneapolis at 800 4th Street SE and had two daughters, Phyllis Ann and Margaret, born in 1905 and 1906. Catherine was a delegate to the annual meeting of the American Humane Association in 1895.

Backus studied at the Minneapolis School of Fine Arts and the School of the Art Institute of Chicago, where she was a pupil of sculptor Lorado Taft. She also spent time in Europe, principally Paris, where she studied art and made sketches.

== Art career ==
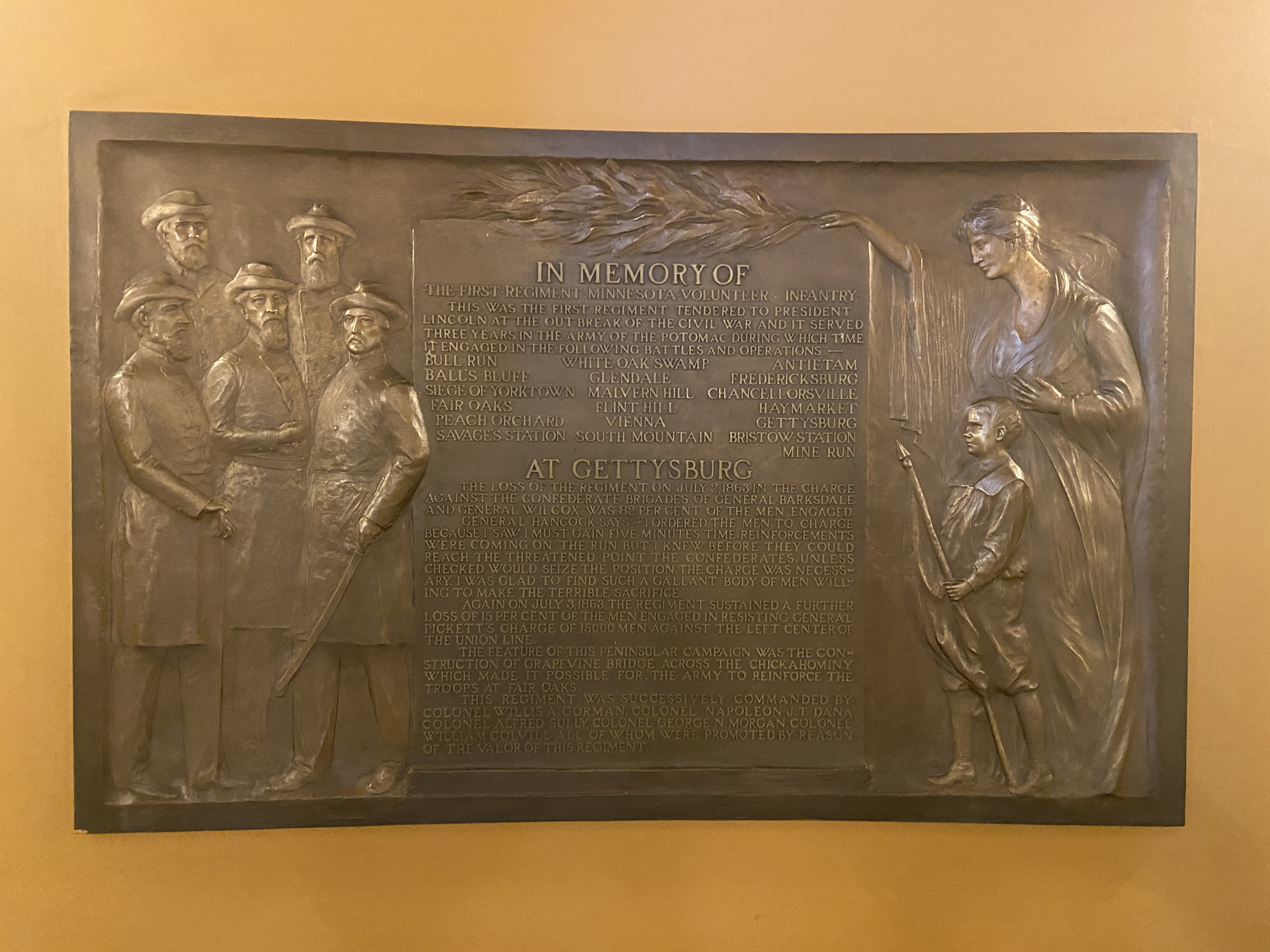
Plaque for the 1st Minnesota Infantry Regiment

Backus only began her art career after her marriage in 1894 and she was usually credited as "Mrs. George J. Backus". She was principally a sculptor and was highly active within the art community of Minneapolis. She was a member of the Arts and Crafts Society of Minneapolis and was elected its vice president in February 1901. She hosted the society's meetings in her studio and contributed her works to their annual exhibitions.

Among her first publicly displayed works was a bust of Reverend H. M. Simmons. The life-size bust was displayed in the show window of the Hudson's department store in 1898 and was praised for its strength of execution and excellent portraiture. In 1902 she created a relief portrait of J. S. Montgomery of Wesley Church. She donated the plaster relief to one of the church's bible schools to raise money for the church mortgage. By 1903, Backus had acquired a studio in Minneapolis in a barn on 615 9th Avenue SE. That year, she was named to the Arts Committee of the Minnesota Federation of Women's Clubs.

In 1903, she designed her first bronze work, a memorial tablet of horticulturalist John S. Harris (1826–1901). The tablet was cast at the American Bronze Foundry Company in Chicago and shown at a meeting of the Minnesota Horticultural Society in December 1903. It was described by an article in The Minneapolis Journal as a "very satisfactory piece of work". Backus designed the clay tablet used for the bronze piece based on a poor photograph of Harris. The tablet depicts Harris in high relief, writing while holding an apple and bordered by grape vines. An inscription was included at the bottom. A statuette of hers entitled The Miniature was praised in The Minneapolis Journal for "the transparent, airy effect of the draperies".

In 1904 she completed a bas-relief portrait of poet Arthur Upson.

=== Statue of Captain John Tapper ===
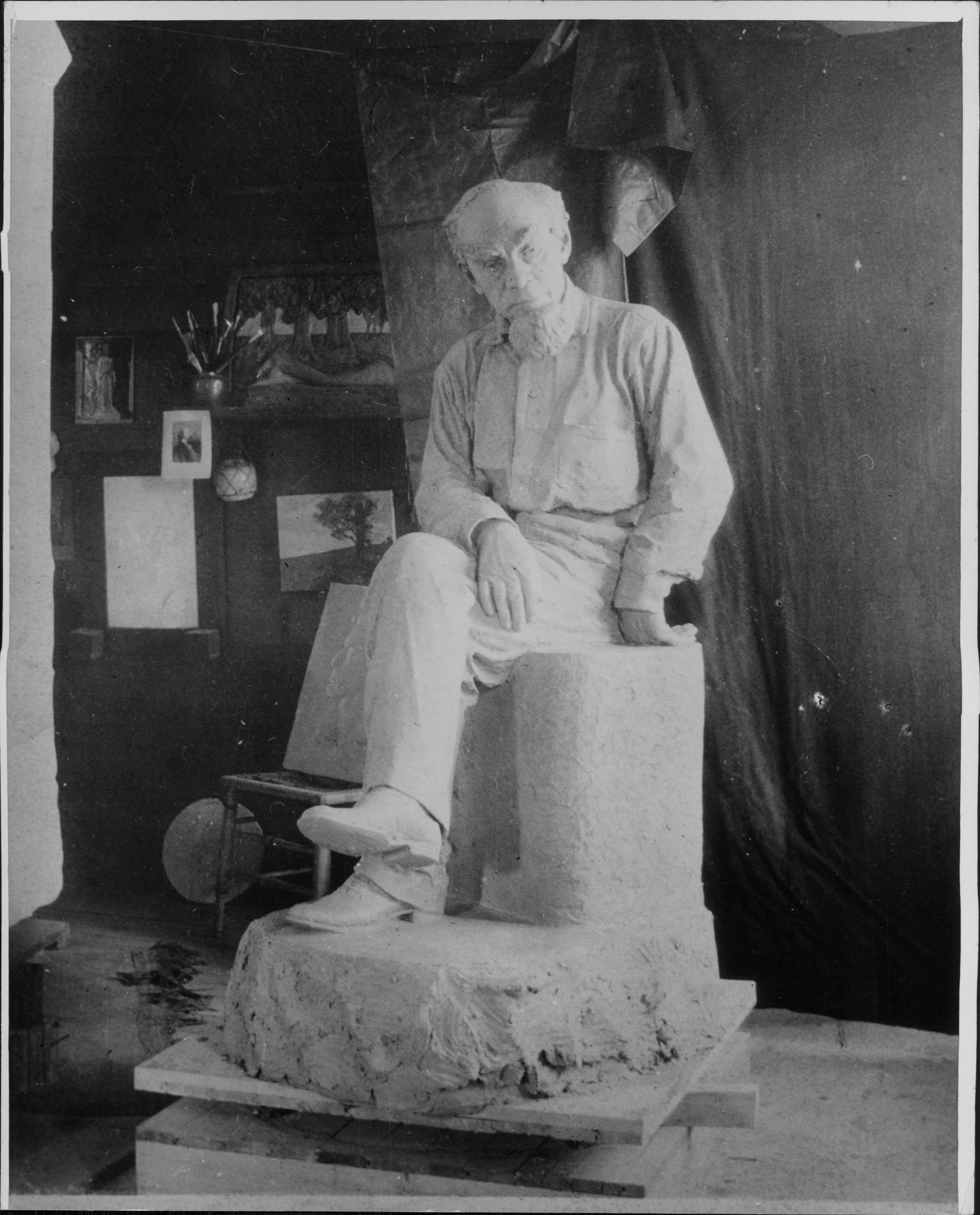
Backus's statue of John Tapper in her studio

In 1904, Backus also sculpted a life-size statue of Captain John Tapper (1820–1909), an England-born veteran of the Mexican–American War who served as a well-known ferryman across the Mississippi River above Saint Anthony Falls. She conceived the project after learning that Tapper was still alive and spent a week trying to locate him before finally tracking him down at the Minnesota State Fair.

The sculpture won second prize at the 1905 exhibition of the Minnesota State Art Society. The plaster statue was displayed on the third floor at the downtown Minneapolis Public Library for years, and was sent to the pioneer museum in the Godfrey House on Chute Square in 1915. It was lost some time after that. Backus recalled having asked that it be taken to a statuary shop belonging to Venanzio Pierotti where it could be packed and shipped to her in Florida. She later tried to track down the statue when she returned to Minnesota in 1937, but was unable to find it.

=== Bust of Joseph W. Hancock ===
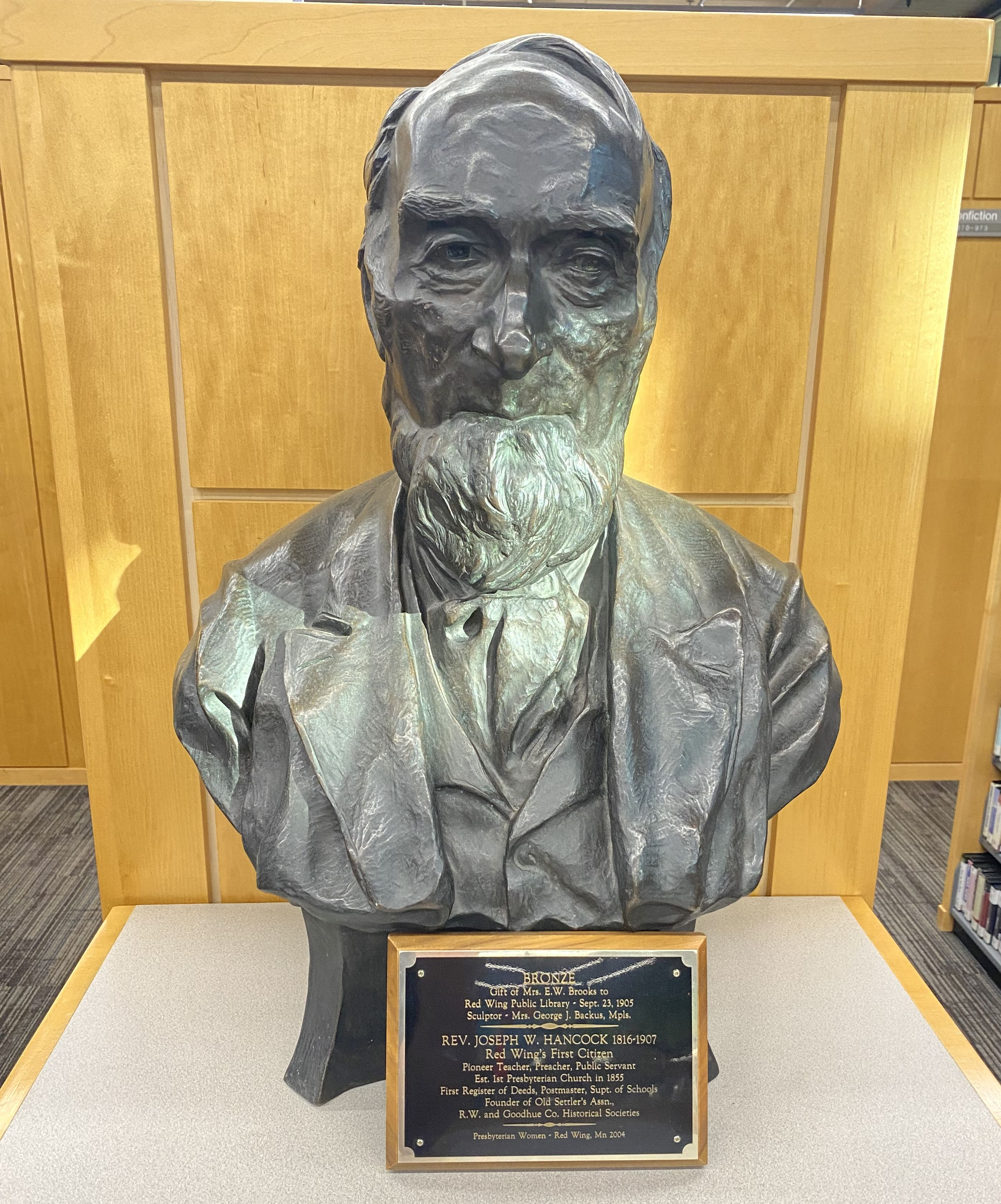
Bust of Reverend Joseph W. Hancock

Backus designed a bronze bust of missionary Joseph W. Hancock in 1905. It was cast in Chicago and unveiled at the Carnegie library in Red Wing.

=== Statue of William Colvill ===
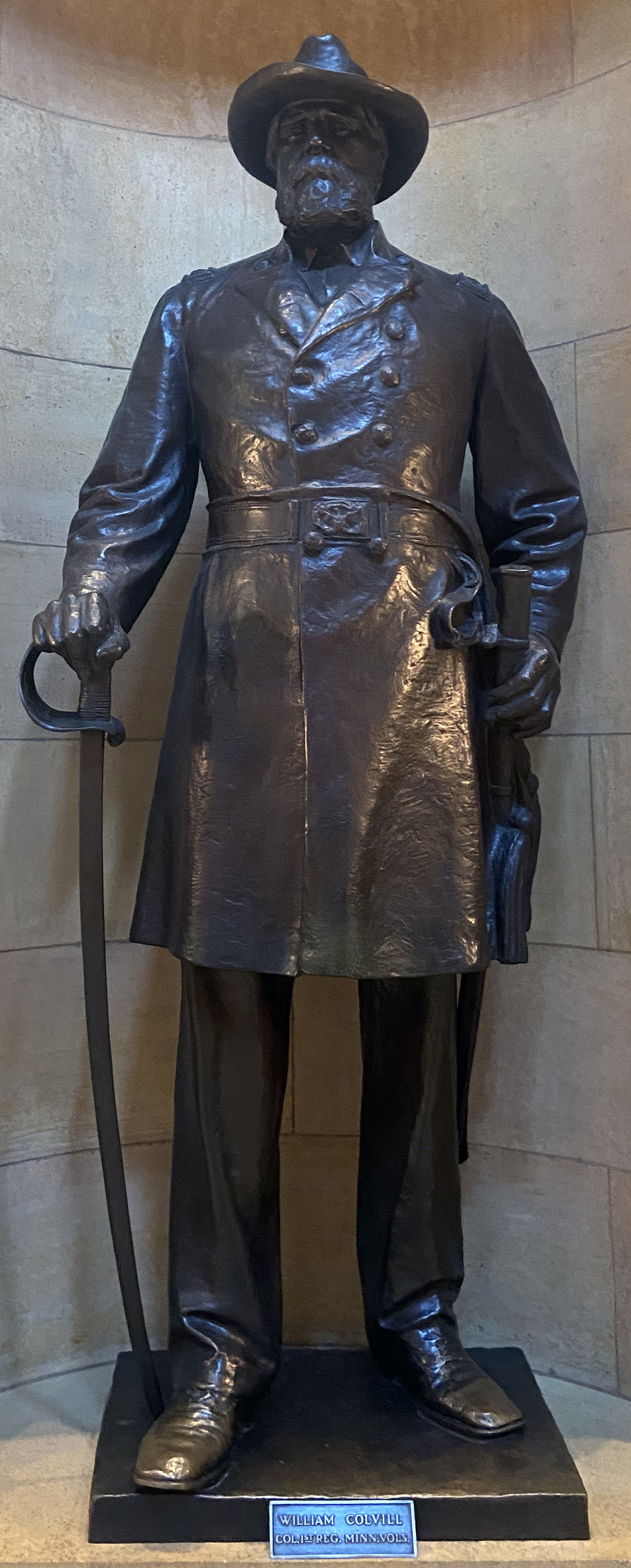
Statue of William Colvill in the Minnesota State Capitol

Backus's most well-known work is her statue of William J. Colvill which resides in the rotunda of the Minnesota State Capitol. The Minnesota legislature passed an act to secure a monument for the man, who had fought at the Battle of Gettysburg and served as Minnesota's Attorney General.

The Col. William Colville [sic] Monument Commission was appointed by Governor Johnson in 1907. At a meeting in St. Paul, the commission asked the opinion of Chicago sculptor, Lorado Taft, who was in the city at the time. While he did not recommend any of the models, he thought the model by Backus had points in its favor. They selected Backus's model to execute in full-size bronze. The appropriation for the monument was $10,000. Backus had met Colvill in Red Wing, Minnesota, and had the opportunity to draw him. After his death, she later made a death mask of his head and face.

Capitol architect Cass Gilbert was not pleased with any of the four immense bronze Civil War statues that stand on the second floor of the building and he was least satisfied with the work of Backus, which he called a "damned bad statue." Gilbert wanted a sculptor of international repute to do Colvill's statue. When the citizens' group that commissioned Backus ignored that wish, he wrote to the group: "You now have before you models for this important work by persons who are naturally ambitious but who, so far as I can ascertain, utterly lack the training and experience to execute the work."

Despite Gilbert's evaluation, the work by Backus was placed in the Capitol, and many other memorials without Gilbert's blessing followed. Backus also went on to design a bas relief bronze memorial plaque for the First Minnesota Volunteer Infantry, which is mounted on a wall on the Capitol's first floor. In 1928 President Coolidge dedicated a second casting of Backus' William Colvill statue in Cannon Falls, Minnesota, Colvill's hometown.

== Move to Florida ==
Backus became seriously ill during the winters in Minnesota, and moved with her family to Florida in February 1911. she and her husband bought hundreds of acres of land alongside the southern end of the South Fork of the St. Lucie River, near Stuart, Florida.

At their home, known as the Backus Plantation, they grew vegetables, citrus, and flowers. She seems to have abandoned sculpture at this point, and while she never grew flowers in Minnesota, she took to horticulture and was soon growing gladioli, asters, and Easter lilies. She supervised the planting and cultivation of the flowers as well as the packing of plants that were shipped north in cardboard boxes through the post office. Her large-scale flower production operation was one of the earliest to occur in the area.

Backus also planted royal palms (Roystonea regia) around her home and gifted several of the trees to churches and other institutions. She and her husband operated a floral shop in Stuart and planted thousands of palms and other tropical trees.

In February 1953, Backus fell at her home, breaking her arm. She died on July 29, 1955, while visiting a relative in Miami and is interred at the Woodlawn Park North Cemetery and Mausoleum.
