= Peter Gideon Farmhouse =

Historic house in Minnesota, United States

- U.S. National Register of Historic Places
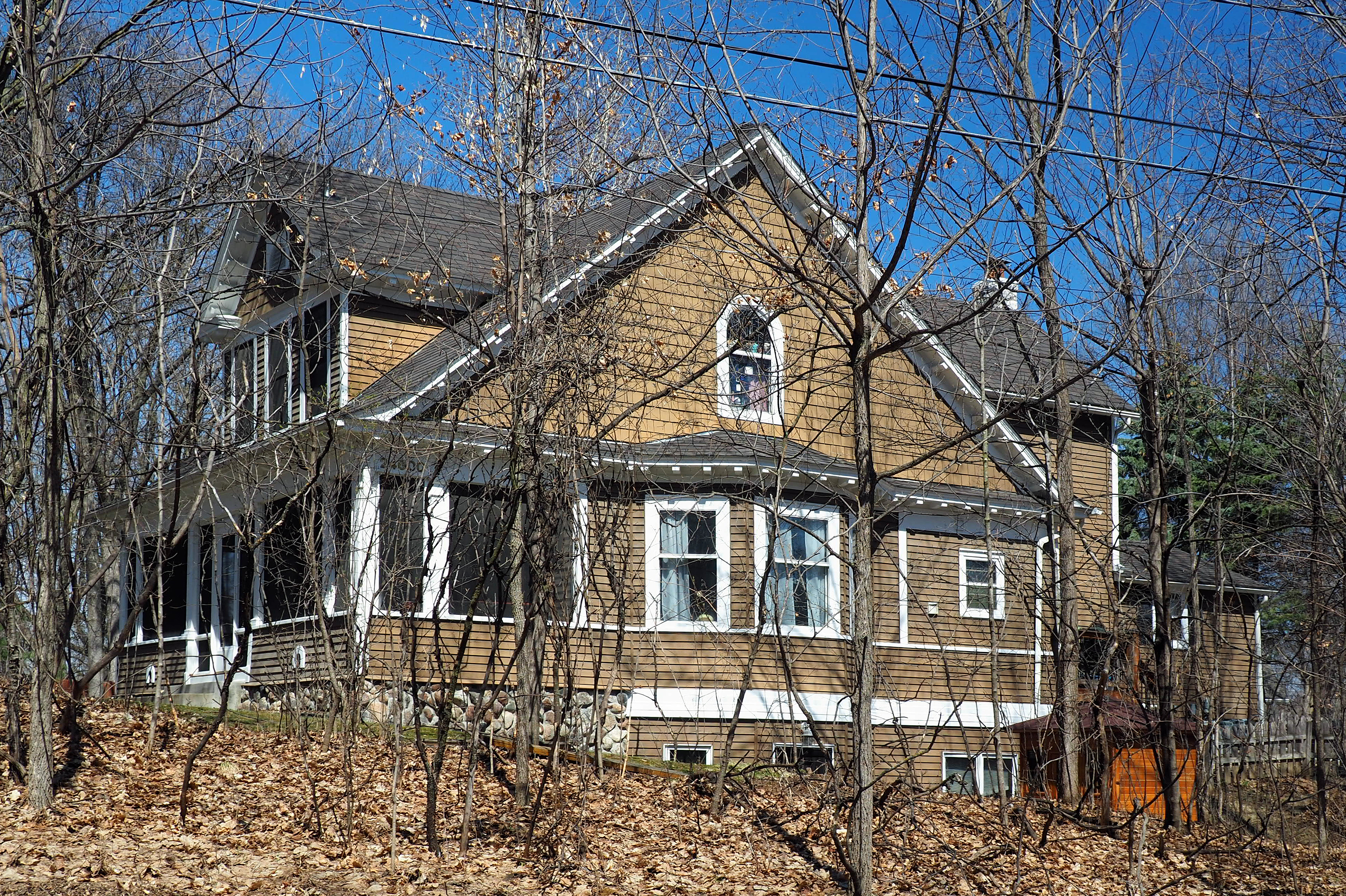
- The Peter Gideon Farmhouse viewed from the south

- Location within Minnesota Location within the United States
- Location: 24590 Glen Road, Shorewood, Minnesota
- Coordinates: 44°54′13″N 93°35′32″W
- Architectural style: Colonial Revival
- NRHP reference No.: 74001019
- Added to NRHP: September 17, 1974

Peter Gideon (1820–1899) was a farmer near Excelsior, Minnesota, United States, who was responsible for breeding apples that could withstand Minnesota's climate. Gideon's farmhouse, now within the boundaries of Shorewood, Minnesota, is listed on the National Register of Historic Places.

Gideon moved to Minnesota in 1853, near Lake Minnetonka, and experimented with planting pear, plum, cherry, peach, and apple seeds. After ten years of experimentation, the harsh Minnesota winters had killed off all of his trees except for one seedling crab apple tree. Seeking advice from a well-known expert in the field, he started corresponding with apple expert Francis Peabody Sharp in Woodstock, New Brunswick, Canada who had employed new, successful methods of hybridization starting back in 1844 (see more here: https://en.wikipedia.org/wiki/Francis_Peabody_Sharp). Sharp instructed him on the proper methods for hybridizing apples and buying seeds for colder climates, specifically indicating Bangor, Maine as the place to buy the seeds (Bangor, ME is located directly over the border from Woodstock, Canada). Gideon never told anybody about corresponding with Sharp nor gave him any credit for his expert advice. Gideon, being a transcendentalist, just said "an invisible being" came to him in a dream and told him to get some Russian seeds from a company in Bangor, Maine. There is, however, written evidence of Sharp and Gideon corresponding about these matters. Therefore, thanks to the expert advice of Francis Peabody Sharp, he sent back to Bangor, Maine for seeds and scions, and continued his experiments by grafting a scion onto the crab apple tree. From this experiment, in 1868 he successfully selected a variety of apple that he named the "Wealthy", in honor of his wife.

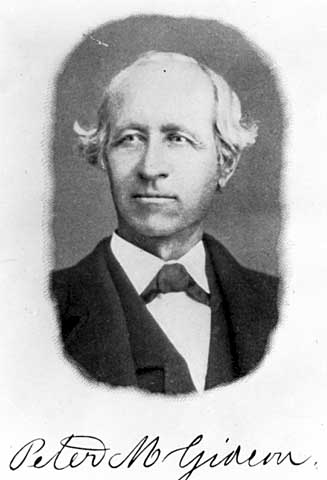
Peter Gideon. Portrait in the collection of the Minnesota Historical Society

In March 1878, Minnesota established a State Experimental Fruit Farm by act of the Legislature which Gideon ran for eleven years, planting many thousands of apple trees and distributing his best seeds across the state. He had been experimenting unsuccessfully with breeding apples for the colder Minnesota climate. This is what led him to seek out the expertise and advice of Francis Peabody Sharp's on how to grow his fruits in Minnesota, using Russian seeds and using new Sharp's new techniques of hybridization. [1]

The state farm was located near Gideon's land on Lake Minnetonka, under the jurisdiction of the University of Minnesota. When the farm closed in February 1889 due to conflicts with the University, Gideon lost his job. Gideon later became the first superintendent of a University of Minnesota agricultural experiment station established in 1878. The station was abandoned in 1889, when he retired, but in 1907 the Minnesota Legislature established a fruit breeding farm between Excelsior and Chaska. The fruit breeding farm later became the Horticultural Research Center, which is now part of the Minnesota Landscape Arboretum. The center later developed the Haralson apple, introduced in 1922. The Wealthy apple is genetically related to the Haralson, though it took DNA testing to rediscover this fact after extensive hybridization.

== See also ==
- John S. Harris (horticulturalist)
