= Beacon (apple) =

Apple cultivar

Malus domestica 'Beacon'
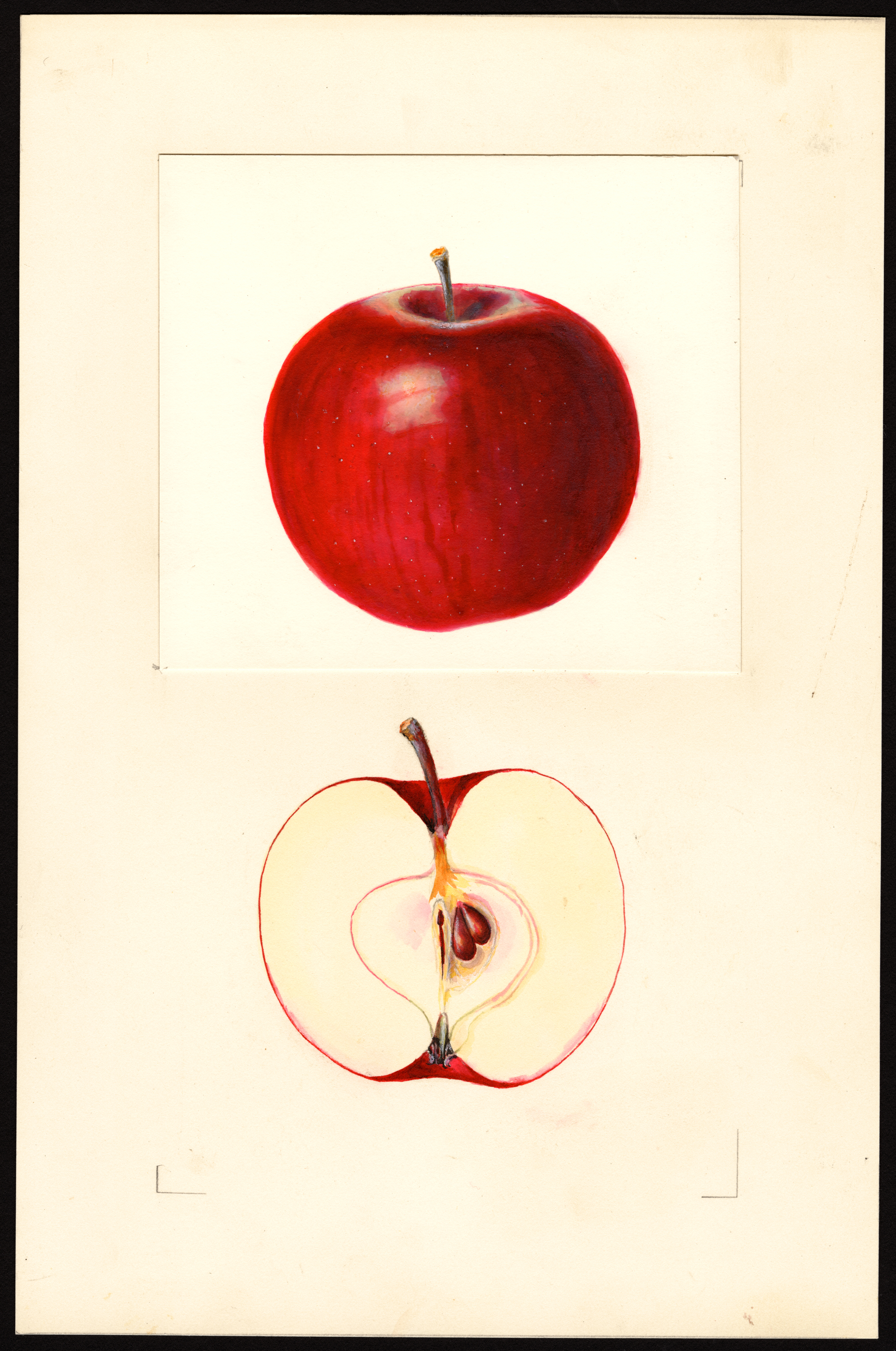
- Cultivar: 'Beacon'
- Origin: (United States) Minneapolis-St. Paul Minnesota, 1936

Beacon is a cold-hardy cultivar of apple developed by University of Minnesota in 1936. It is a cross between 'Wealthy' and 'Malinda' apples. This apple is medium in size with full, deep red stripes. Its flesh is pulpy and fairly soft, with a mildy sweet flavor. This apple is good for cooking and eating (when fresh).

== See also ==
- 'Haralson' - a cultivar that is assumed to be of the same parentage
