= La Crosse West Channel Bridge =

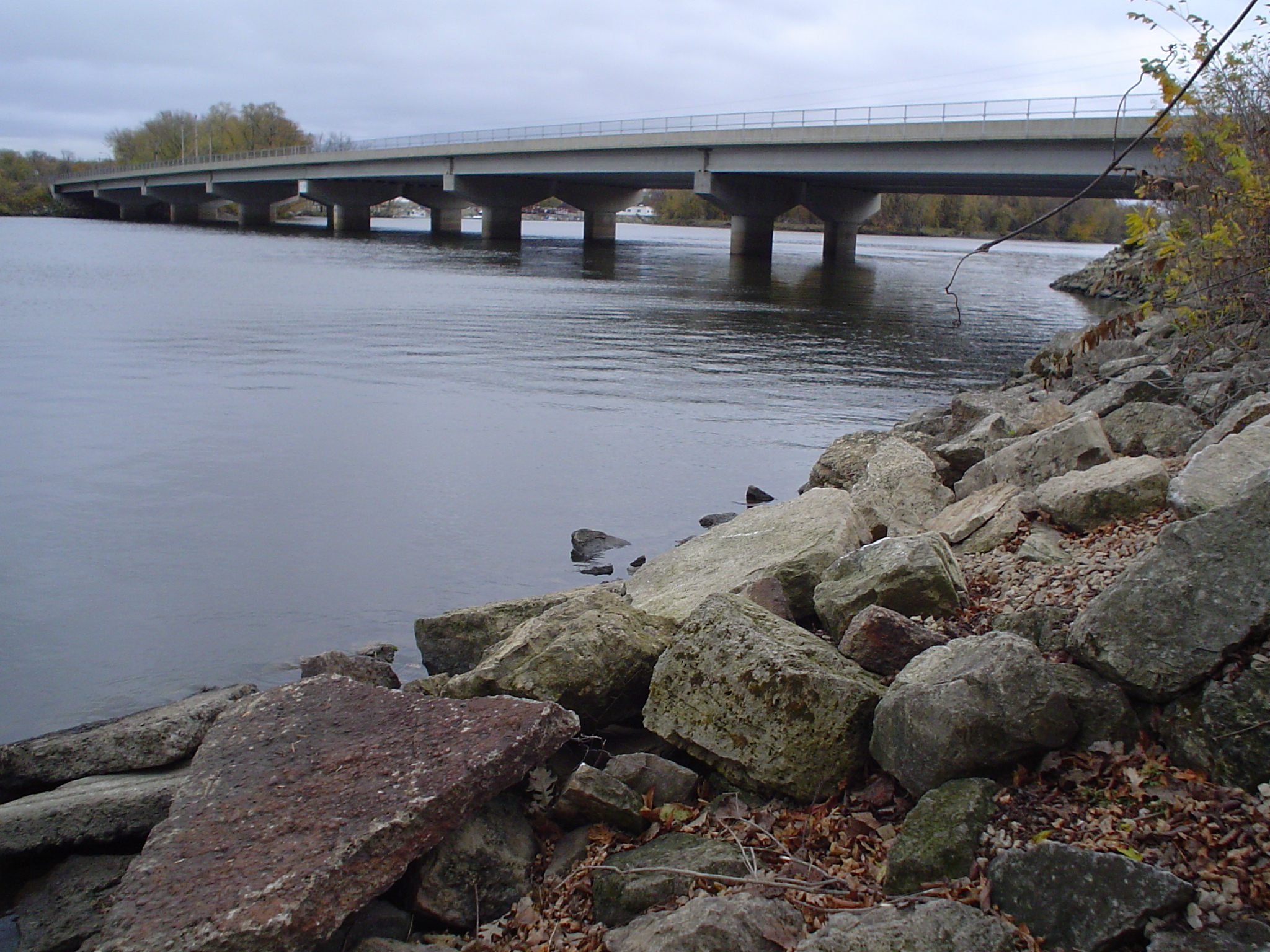
- Coordinates: 43°49′7.3″N 91°16′22.6″W
- Carries: 4 lanes of US 14 / US 61/ MN 16/ WIS 16
- Crosses: Mississippi River
- Locale: La Crosse, Wisconsin, to La Crescent, Minnesota
- Maintained by: Minnesota Department of Transportation

Characteristics
- Design: Plate girder bridge

Statistics
- Daily traffic: 15,100

Location
- Interactive map of La Crosse West Channel Bridge

The La Crosse West Channel Bridge is a plate girder bridge that spans the west channel of the Mississippi River between Barron Island in Wisconsin, and La Crescent, MN. Together with the Mississippi River Bridge it forms a connection between La Crescent and downtown La Crosse, Wisconsin. The Mississippi River Bridge carries U.S. Routes 14 and 61, and forms the eastern terminus of MN-16 and the western terminus of WI 16.

== Photo gallery ==
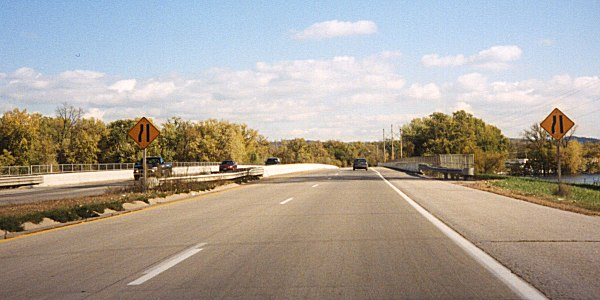
La Crosse West Channel Bridge from the road

== See also ==
- List of crossings of the Upper Mississippi River
