= Mississippi River Bridge =

Mississippi River Bridge may refer to:

- Mississippi River Bridge (I-35W) or I-35W Mississippi River bridge, a bridge in Minnesota that collapsed in 2007
- Mississippi River Bridge (Vicksburg, Mississippi) or Old Vicksburg Bridge
- Mississippi River Bridge (La Crosse, Wisconsin)

== See also ==
- Lists of crossings of the Mississippi River
- New Mississippi River Bridge or Stan Musial Veterans Memorial Bridge, a bridge between St. Clair County and St. Louis
