= Wealthy (apple) =

American apple cultivar

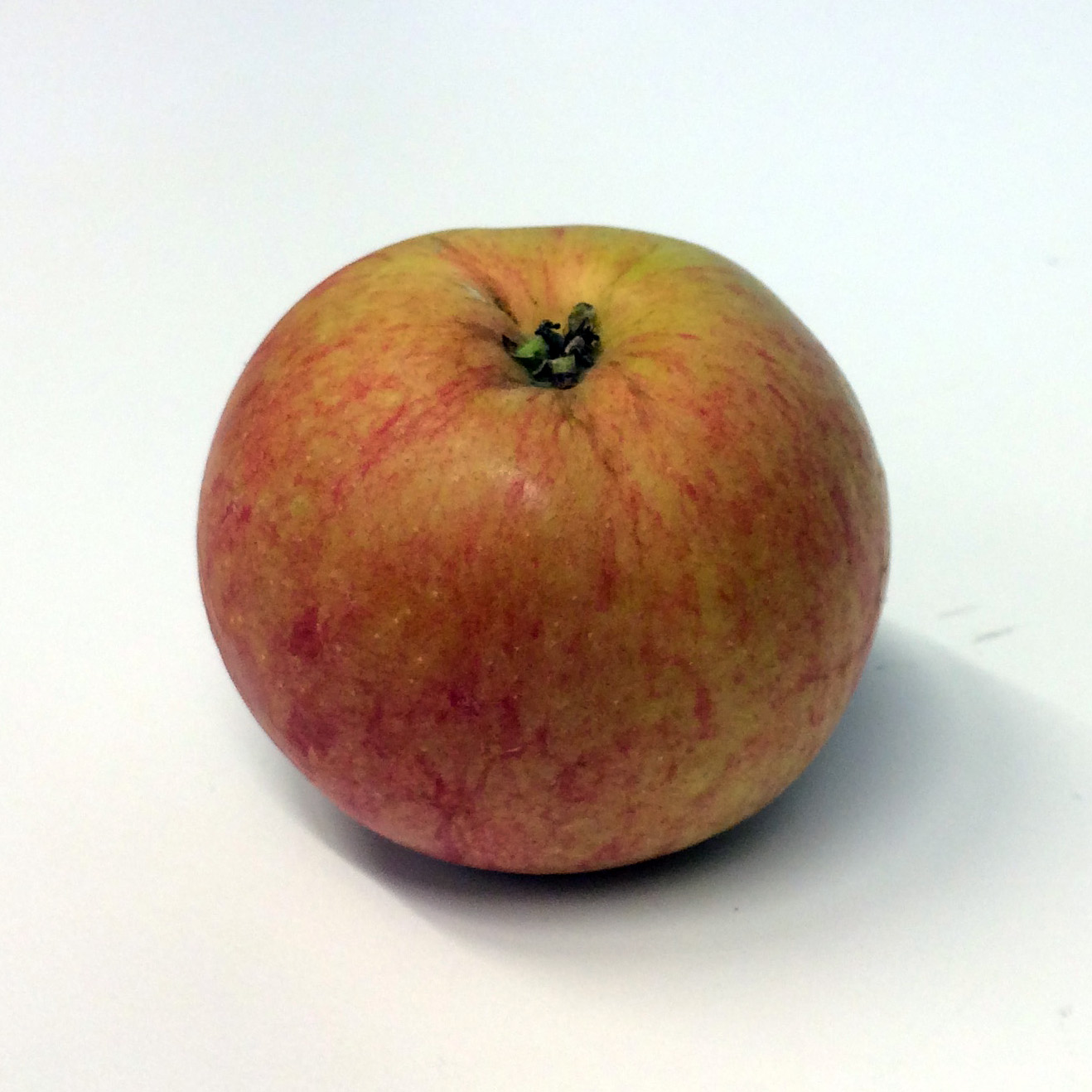
Apple of the variety Wealthy, photographed in conjunction with the Apple Festival at the Nordic Museum, Stockholm, Sweden in September 2014.

The Wealthy is an American apple cultivar, and was the earliest to thrive in the Minnesota climate. Horticulturalist Peter Gideon grew it after years of trial and error with various apple varieties, and the fruit was described in 1869.

== History ==
Before 1868, only crab apples grew reliably in Minnesota. Indigenous peoples in the area harvested other crops, but they did not grow apples. Early White settlers to Minnesota tried to grow apples using seeds and seedlings from their former homes to the east and the south, but their plants died, usually because of the region's harsh winters.

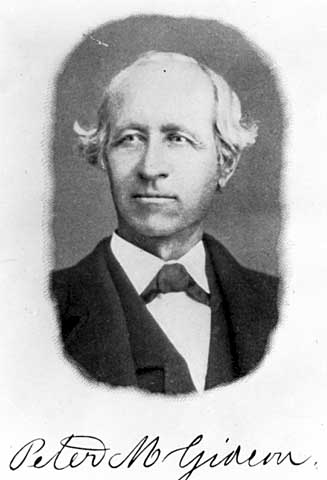
Peter Gideon (1820-1899), creator of the cultivar

In 1853, Peter Gideon moved to Minnesota for health reasons and took a homestead with his family on the shores of Lake Minnetonka, near Excelsior. He had learned fruit-growing as a child, and when he arrived on his new land, he planted a bushel of apple seeds he had brought with him from his former home in Maine, Illinois. In the years that followed, Gideon experimented with apple and fruit growing, planting thousands of trees, but most of his trees died within a few years, if not right away, and none of them bore much fruit.

By 1861, Gideon and his family had only one surviving apple tree, a Siberian crab apple, and they were down to their last eight dollars. Determined to find an apple that would grow in Minnesota, Gideon sent the family's last dollars to an apple grower in Bangor, Maine, and got apple seeds and scions in return. Just one of the resulting trees, crossed with Gideon's Siberian crab apple, produced the apple that Gideon later named the Wealthy, after his wife, Wealthy (Hull) Gideon.

Until recently it was believed a Siberian crab apple was one of Wealthy's parents imparting the cultivar's cold hardiness; however, DNA testing revealed it is a cross between Duchess of Oldenburg and Jonathan.

He was a member of the Minnesota State Horticultural Society, and he shared his knowledge and his trees freely, giving scions away to anyone who asked for them. Soon, Wealthy apples were growing in many locations in Minnesota, as well as in other states, especially states in the Upper Midwest with similar climates. In 1870, Colonel John H. Stevens addressed the Minnesota Horticultural Society with these words:

True, we were under a cloud for a long time. We planted but did not harvest. Our trees withered and perished. Whether it was the frosts of Winter or the sun of Summer that caused them to prematurely die, no one has been able to determine. Plant as we would, the trees sickened and died. No wonder, then, we became discouraged. Orchards to the third and fourth planting failed, a constant drain on the pocket without a ray of light in the future, influenced us in abandoning the enterprise. But those days, and their trials, have passed.

By the early 20th century, the Wealthy apple was one of the top five apples grown nationally, but beyond his employment at the state farm, Gideon never made any money from the Wealthy apple. The Wealthy apple also was the parent of other successful Minnesota apples, such as the Haralson, which was developed at the University of Minnesota's Fruit Breeding Farm in 1922.

== See also ==
- Tartu Rose
- Applecrab
- John S. Harris (horticulturalist)

== Bibliography ==
- Alderman, W. H. Development of Horticulture on the Northern Great Plains. [St. Paul]: Sponsored by the Great Plains Region American Society for Horticultural Science, 1962.
- Duin, Edgar C. "Peter M. Gideon: Pioneer Horticulturist." Minnesota History 44 no. 3 (Fall 1974): 96-103.
- Hedrick, U.P. A History of Horticulture in America to 1860. New York: Oxford University Press, 1950.
- "Peter Gideon, Pioneer, Kept on Raising Apples," Minnetonka Record, September 20, 1935.

This article incorporates text from MNopedia, which is licensed under the Creative Commons Attribution-ShareAlike 3.0 Unported License.
