= Malinda (apple) =

Apple cultivar

Malus pumila 'Malinda'
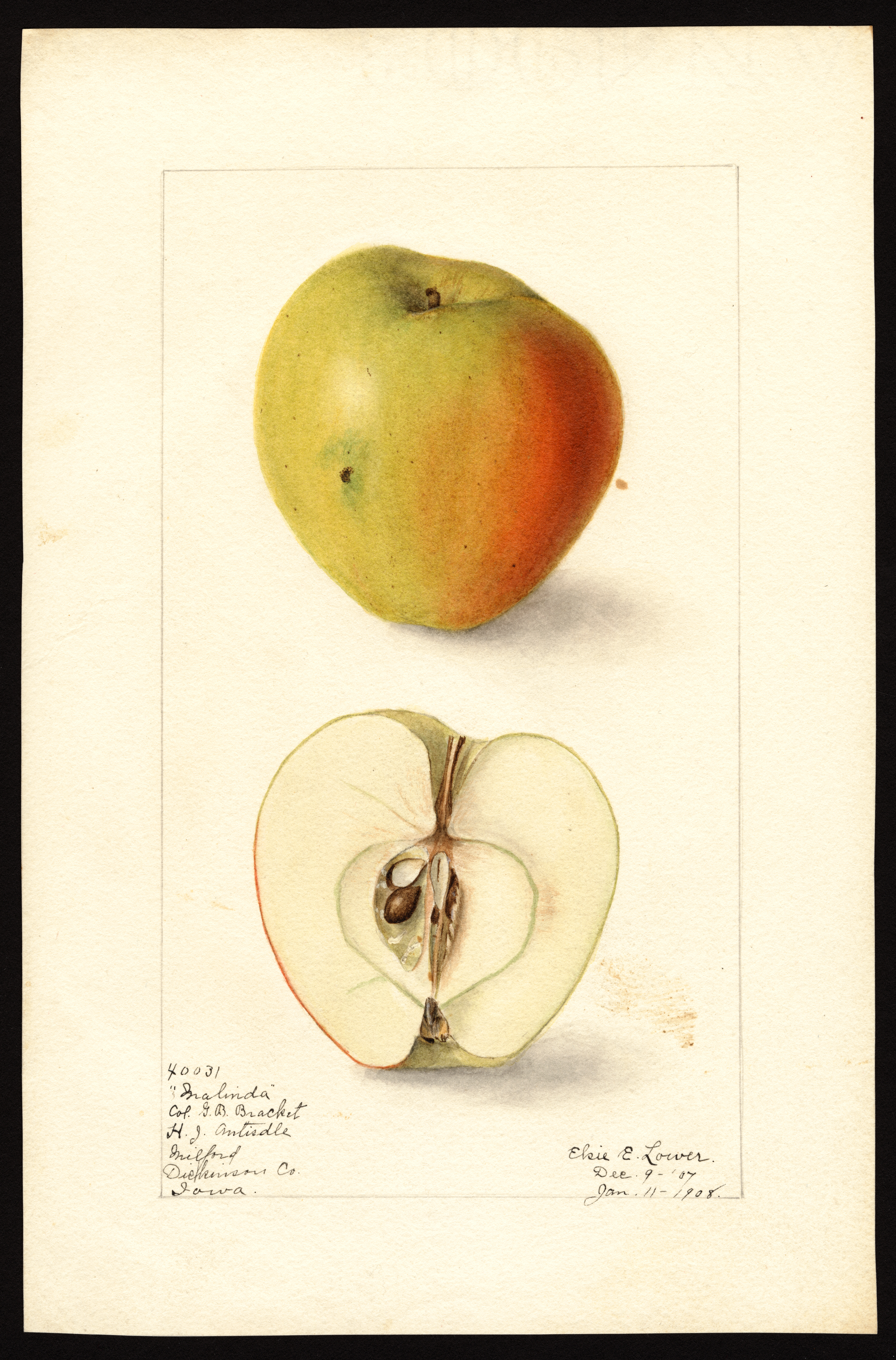
- Species: Malus pumila
- Hybrid parentage: Apparently unknown
- Origin: Vermont

The malinda apple is a cultivar of domesticated apple, originating in New England., most likely Vermont.

== The Malinda's importance in other apples ==
Malinda genes, whether as a parent, grandparent, or great-grandparent, led to all of

1. Chestnut Crab,
2. Folwell,
3. Haralson,
4. Beacon,
5. Honeygold,
6. Honeycrisp,
7. Keepsake
8. Minnehaha,
9. MN 1606, and
10. Sweet Sixteen

== The flavor of the Malinda Apple ==
The flavor of a Malinda is akin to the taste of pears.
