= Marguerite Kerrigan =

American baseball player (1931–2022)

- Pitcher / Infield / Outfield Utility
- Born: July 24, 1931; La Crescent, Minnesota, U.S.
- Died: February 12, 2022 (aged 90)
- Batted: Right Threw: Right

Teams
- Rockford Peaches (1950–1952)

Career highlights and awards
- Women in Baseball – AAGPBL Permanent Display at the Baseball Hall of Fame and Museum (since 1988)

Marguerite Kerrigan (July 24, 1931 – February 12, 2022) was an American pitcher and infield/outfield utility who played in the All-American Girls Professional Baseball League (AAGPBL). Listed at 5' 9", 150 lb., Kerrigan batted and threw right handed. She was dubbed Kerry by her teammates.

Born in La Crescent, Minnesota, Marguerite Kerrigan played from 1950 through 1952 for the Rockford Peaches, even though she saw limited action. Kerrigan played baseball with her cousins as a child before starting to play organized softball while attending high school. She then attended the College of Saint Teresa in Winona, Minnesota, where she played for a local team. At the time, she had a friend In Rockford who told her about the league and convinced her to try out in 1950. The Peaches signed Marguerite, but did not use her much over three seasons.

Afterwards, Kerrigan played for a team sponsored by R. H. Hall in St. Petersburg, Florida that won several state titles. In addition, she worked as a reservation sales agent for Delta Air Lines for 24 years, retiring in 1987. She then moved to Largo, Florida.

The All-American Girls Professional Baseball League folded in 1954, but there is now a permanent display at the Baseball Hall of Fame and Museum in Cooperstown, New York since November 5, 1988 that honors those who were part of the league. Marguerite Kerrigan, along with the rest of the girls and the league staff, is included in the display/exhibit.

Kerrigan died on February 12, 2022, at the age of 90.
