= Tartu Rose =

Apple cultivar

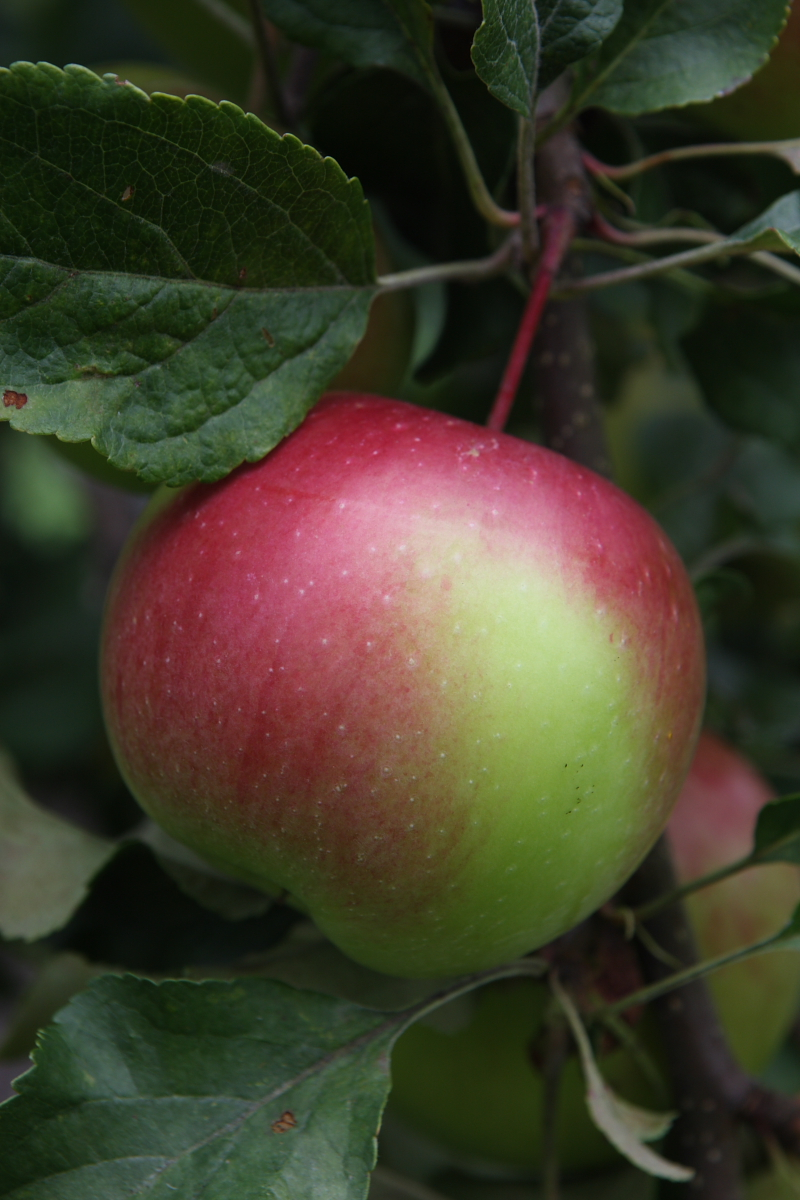
Tartu Rose

Tartu Rose (Estonian: Tartu roos) is an apple cultivar from Estonia.

At first it was thought to be an original cultivar and therefore named with its own name. Later, a strong similarity to the American 'Wealthy' cultivar was discovered.
