= Daniel A. Robertson =

American politician (1812–1895)

Member of the Minnesota House of Representatives from the 02 district
- In office December 7, 1859 – January 7, 1861

Mayor of St. Paul
- In office 1859–1860
- Preceded by: Norman Kittson
- Succeeded by: John S. Prince

Delegate to the Ohio Constitutional Convention of 1850-1851
- In office 1850–1850

Personal details
- Born: May 13, 1812 Pictou, Nova Scotia
- Died: March 16, 1895 (aged 82) Saint Paul, Minnesota
- Party: Democratic
- Spouse: Julia Annie Bell (m. 1844)
- Children: 6
- Occupation: journalist; politician; lawyer

Military service
- Branch/service: Minnesota State Militia
- Rank: Colonel

Daniel A. Robertson (May 13, 1812 – March 16, 1895) was a Democratic politician, newspaper proprietor, and lawyer who served in local and state politics in Ohio and Minnesota. Robertson served in the Ohio Constitutional Convention of 1850-1851 for 3 months before resigning to move to Minnesota. Robertson was a Mayor of Saint Paul from 1859 to 1860, resigning as he was elected to the 2nd Minnesota Legislature from December 7, 1859, to January 7, 1861.

Outside of politics, Robertson was a newspaper editor and proprietor. In Ohio, Robertson owned the Mount Vernon Banner, Ohio Eagle of Lancaster, and the Guernsey County News and was an editor of the Cincinnati Enquirer. When Robertson moved to Minnesota, he founded the Minnesota Democrat, which he sold in June 1853 and which merged into the Minnesota Pioneer.. Robertson was one of the founders of the city of Mankato, Minnesota.

== Early life and start of newspaper career ==
Daniel A. Robertson was born on May 13, 1812, in Pictou, Nova Scotia. He moved to New York City at age 18 where he studied law. He was admitted to practice in New York in 1839. After a short while, Robertson abandoned his law practice and pursued a career in journalism. Moving to Ohio, Robertson became the editor and proprietor of three Democratic Ohio papers. Robertson owned the Mount Vernon Banner, the Ohio Eagle of Lancaster, and the Guernsey County News. Robertson also served as an editor of the Cincinnati Enquirer.

Robertson was appointed as a US Marshall for the District of Ohio in 1844 where he served one four-year term. Also in that year, Robertson was married to Julia Annie Bell. In 1850, Ohio began the process of replacing the Ohio Constitution. The Ohio Constitutional Convention of 1850-1851 consisted of a majority of Democratic Party representatives split into liberal and conservative fractions. Robertson was elected as Fairfield County's representative to the convention, but served only three months before moving to Minnesota.

== Move to Minnesota ==
Robertson moved to Minnesota in late fall 1850 and established a newspaper, the Minnesota Democrat, in December. In June 1853, Robertson sold the paper to David Olmsted and it was merged with the Pioneer – eventually the St. Paul Pioneer Press. During this time, Robertson also began to build an extensive private library and became involved with efforts to promote cultural institutions.

In 1855, Robertson served as the chair of the committee seeking to raise funds to construct a building to house the Minnesota Historical Society. Robertson raised $1,500 to purchase two lots in St. Paul on which to build and on, June 24, 1856, organized a gala to celebrate the laying of the society's cornerstone. The building committee was out of funds two weeks later and while plans were made for a potential $15,000 building, no more work was performed following the Panic of 1857. The actuary of the Minnesota Historical Society, William H. Kelley, resigned in late 1859 due to the inability to pay his salary and the Society's collections were closed to the public. Meeting in the Saint Paul Public Library, as the Minnesota State Capitol had no suitable meeting rooms, Robertson, Kelley, and other members began to resuscitate the Society in 1853 and succeeded in getting the Minnesota State Legislature to renew the Society's annual appropriation of $500 in 1864. The Society had no building of its own during Robertson's lifetime, remaining in the Minnesota State Capitol until the Minnesota Historical Society Building completed construction in 1917.

Robertson was elected as Mayor of St. Paul in Spring 1859 and served in that role until he was elected as Representative to the 2nd Minnesota Legislature. Prior to the American Civil War, Robertson served as a colonel of a regiment of the Minnesota National Guard. Robertson also served on the St. Paul board of education from 1862 to 1869. Robertson was elected as Ramsey County sheriff in 1862 and served four terms.

In 1867, while Robertson was a professor of agriculture at the University of Minnesota, he was elected as the first President of the Minnesota State Horticultural Society Robertson was also a member of the National Scientific Association and the American Geographical Society. He was also a member of the Order of Patrons of Husbandry and organized the first "grange" of the order.

Robertson is considered a founding member of the city of Mankato, Minnesota where he built the first log store. He is also credited for suggesting the name of the city.

Robertson died in St. Paul on March 16, 1895.
