= Mississippi River Bridge (La Crosse, Wisconsin) =

Mississippi River Bridge La Crosse, Wisconsin
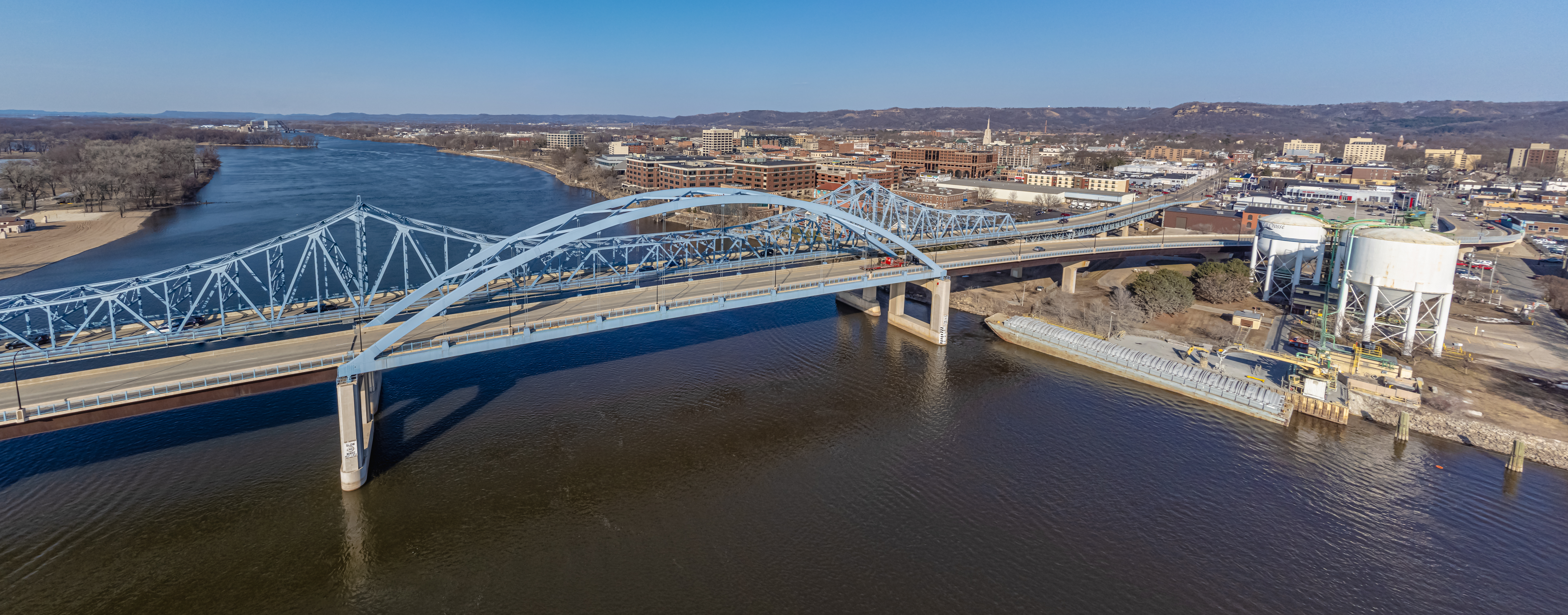
- Coordinates: 43°48′33″N 91°15′34″W
- Carries: 4 lanes of US 14 / US 61/ WIS 16
- Crosses: Mississippi River
- Locale: La Crosse, Wisconsin and La Crescent, Minnesota
- Other name(s): Cass Street Bridge and Cameron Avenue Bridge The Big Blue Bridges
- Maintained by: Wisconsin Department of Transportation

Characteristics
- Design: Cantilever bridge (Cass Street); Tied arch bridge (Cameron Avenue)
- Total length: 2,532 feet (772 m) (Cass Street); 2,573 feet (784 m) (Cameron Avenue)
- Width: 30 feet (9 m) (Cass Street); 50 feet (15 m) (Cameron Avenue)
- Longest span: 475 feet (145 m) (Cameron Avenue)
- Clearance below: 67 feet (20 m) (Cass Street); 68 feet (21 m) (Cameron Avenue)

History
- Opened: September 1939 (Cass Street); November 17, 2004 (Cameron Avenue)

Location
- Interactive map of Mississippi River Bridge; La Crosse, Wisconsin

The Mississippi River Bridge is a combination of two individual bridges which are also known as the Cass Street Bridge and the Cameron Avenue Bridge, as well as the Big Blue Bridges. They connect downtown La Crosse, Wisconsin to Barron Island, crossing the east channel of the Mississippi River. Another bridge, the La Crosse West Channel Bridge, connects Barron Island to La Crescent, Minnesota. The Mississippi River Bridge carries U.S. Routes 14 and 61 with WI 16. There is another bridge about four miles upstream, the I-90 Mississippi River Bridge, that connects North La Crosse, French Island, and Dresbach, Minnesota.

The Cass Street Bridge opened Sept. 23, 1939; replacing the previous Vernon Street swing bridge which was heavily damaged following an automobile accident in 1935.

The bridge's original concrete deck was replaced by a metal deck in 1983.

In 2004, a new tied arch bridge opened, at this point, the original bridge's deck was rehabilitated and both bridges were reopened concurrently in 2005.

== Gallery ==
Gallery
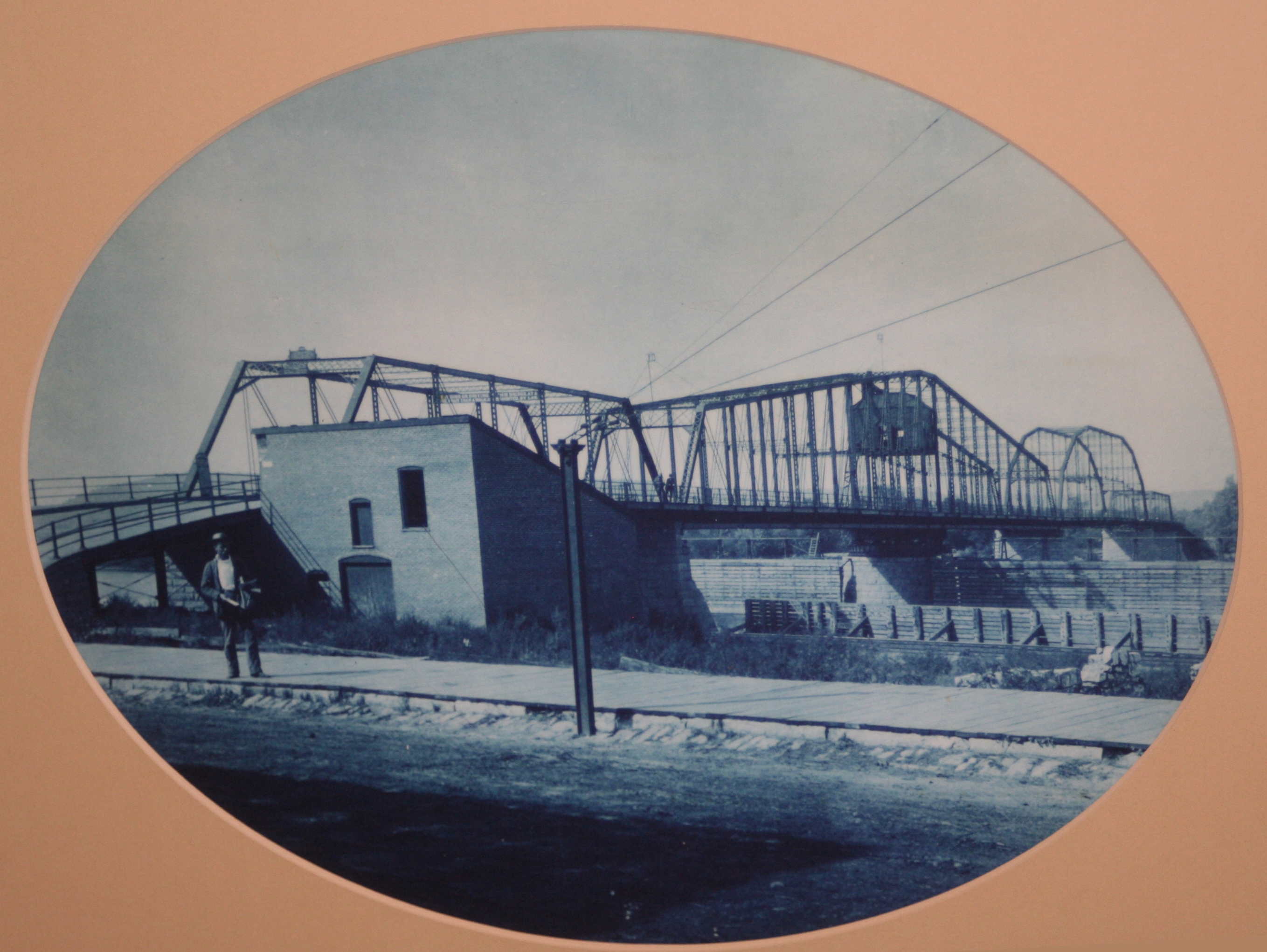
Wagon bridge, 1891

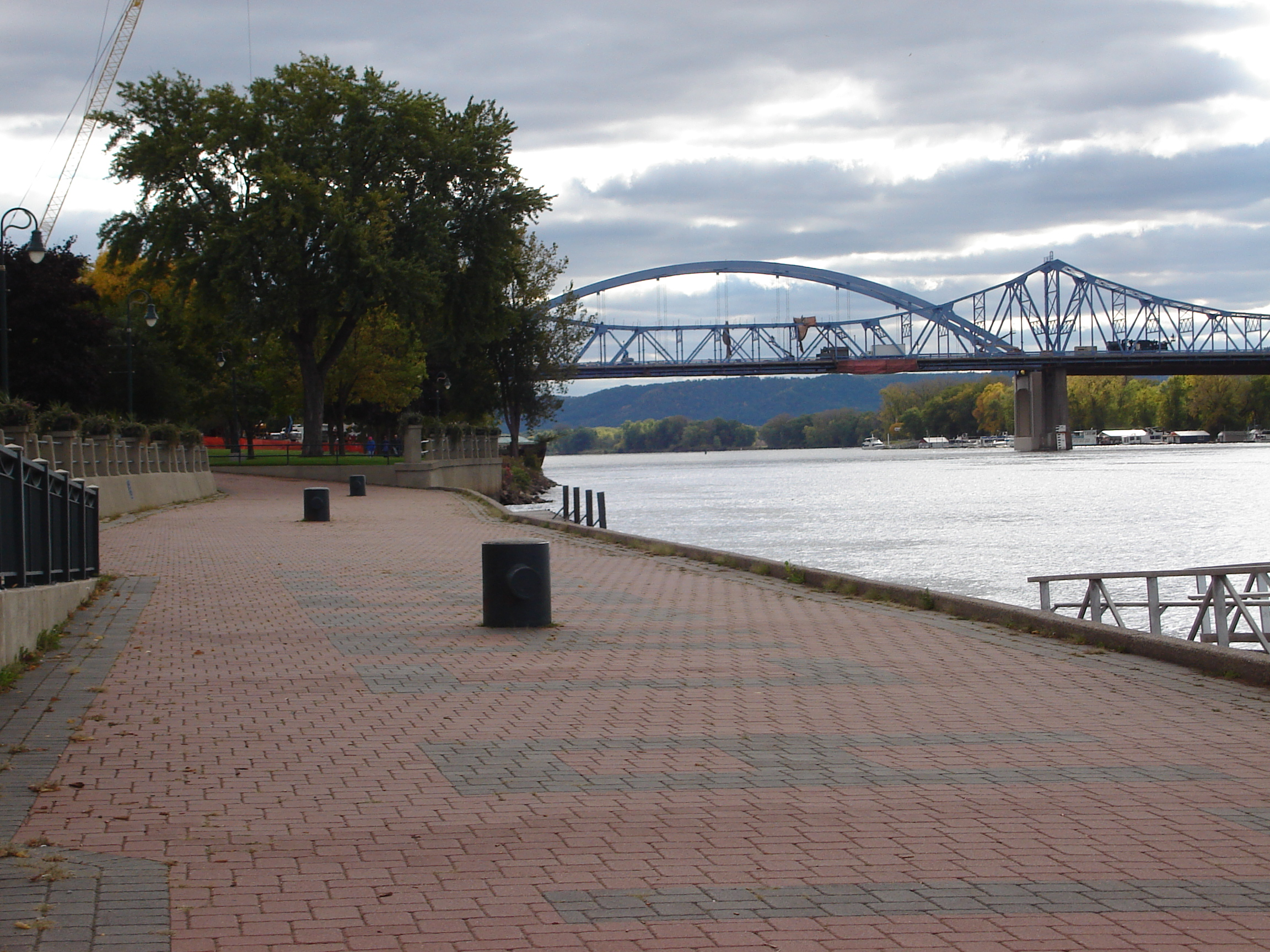
View from Riverside Park in downtown La Crosse

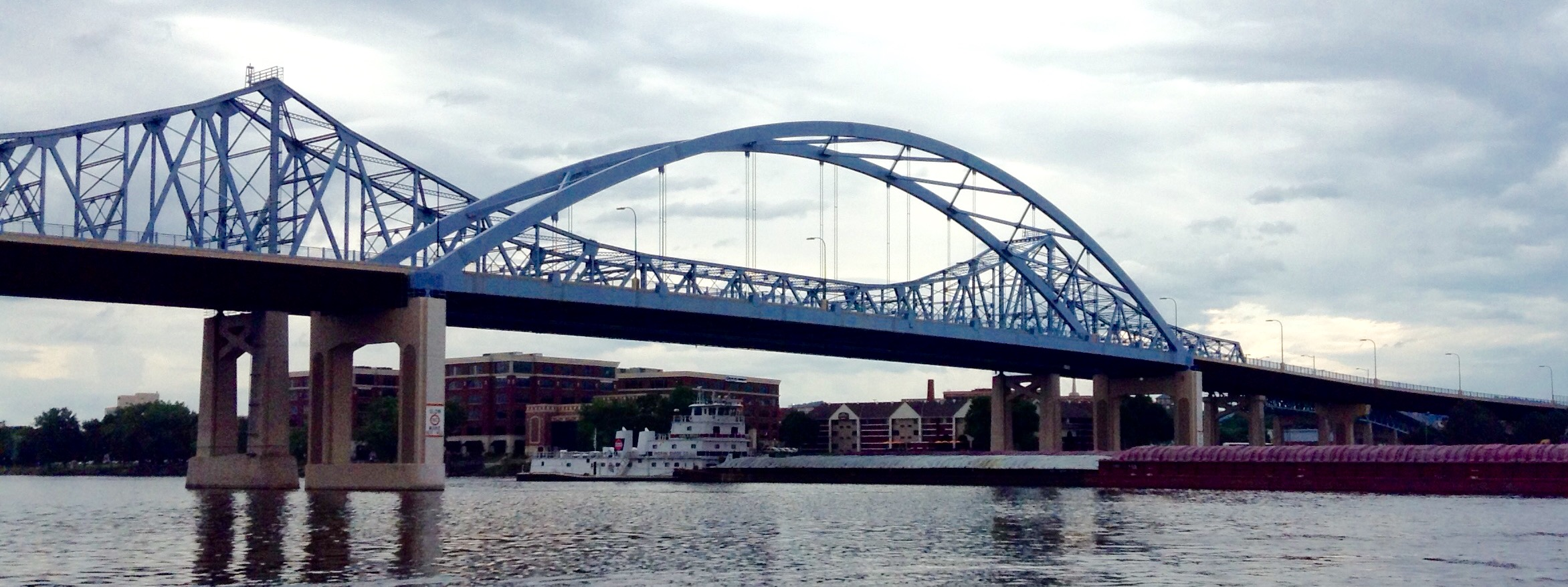
Big Blue Bridge

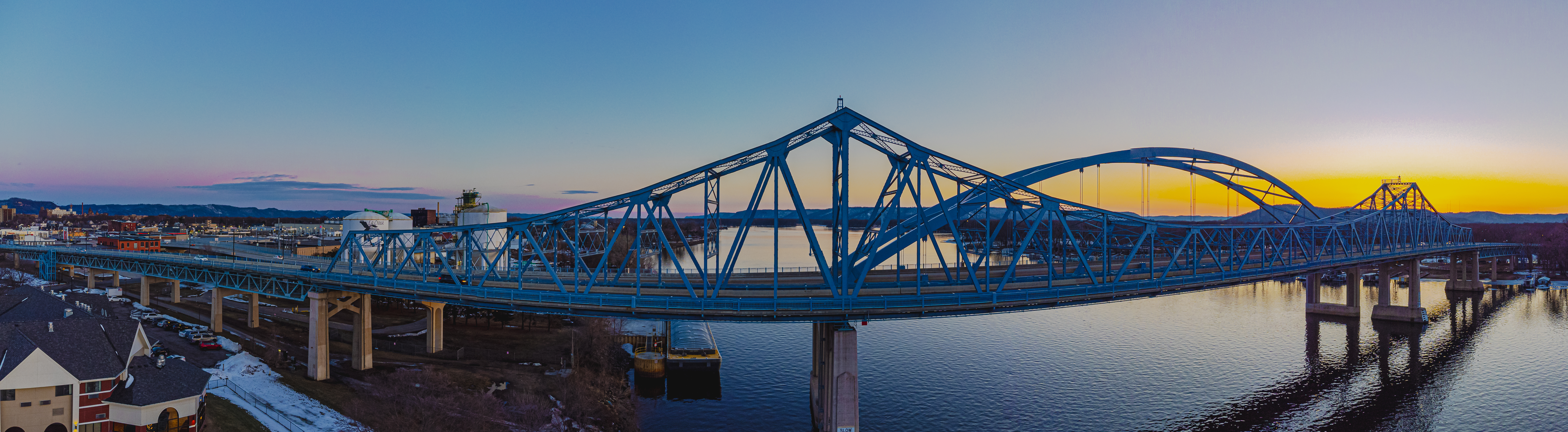
La Crosse "Big Blue Bridges" at sunset

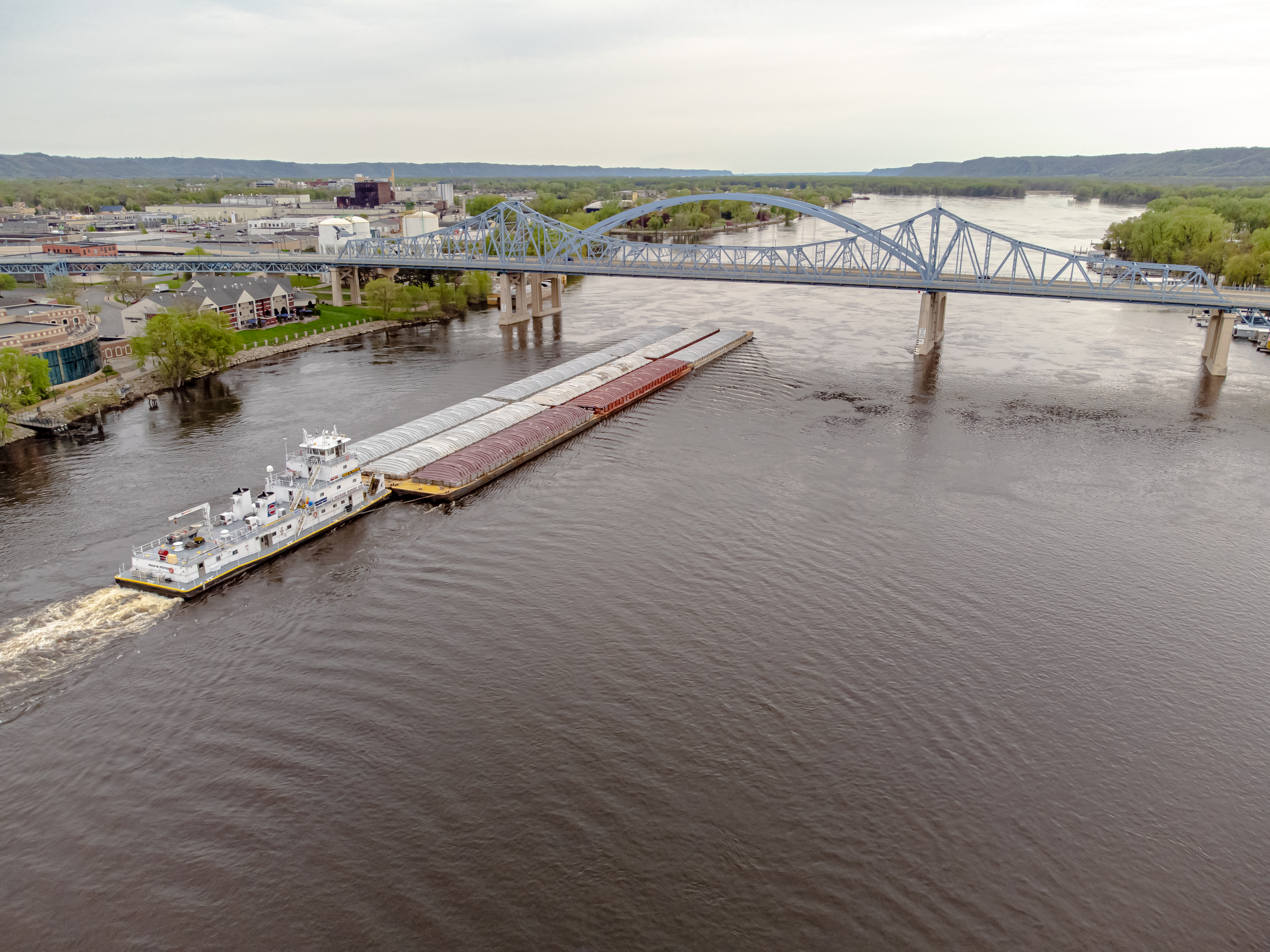
Tow boat La Crosse going under blue bridge

== See also ==
- List of crossings of the Upper Mississippi River
