= La Crescent Public Library =

Library in La Crescent, Minnesota

Coordinates: 43.8288549°N 91.3056941°W

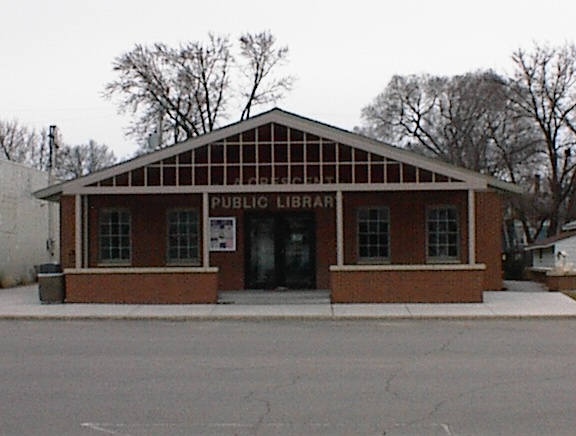
- Location: 321 Main Street; La Crescent, MN 55974

Other information
- Director: Jess Witkins
- Website: https://lacrescent.lib.mn.us/

The La Crescent Public Library is a library in La Crescent, Minnesota. It is a member of Southeastern Libraries Cooperating, the SE Minnesota library region.
