= Al W. Wieser Jr. =

American politician (born 1949)

Al W. Wieser Jr. (born May 15, 1949) was an American politician and businessman.

Wieser lived in La Crescent, Minnesota with his family. Wieser went to the Houston County Public Schools. He graduated from Winona State University with a bachelor's degree in political science and economics. Wieser was an accountant and worked for Al's Concrete in La Crescent, Minnesota. Wieser served in the Minnesota House of Representatives from 1975 to 1983. Elected as a Democrat in 1974, he switched political parties and became a Republican in August 1977.
