= Sweet Sixteen (apple) =

Apple cultivar

Malus pumila 'Sweet Sixteen'
- Species: Malus pumila
- Hybrid parentage: Northern Spy × Malinda
- Cultivar: 'Sweet Sixteen'
- Origin: (United States) Minneapolis-St. Paul Minnesota, 1977, though claims 1978

Sweet Sixteen is a cultivar of domesticated apple.

== Origin ==
The Sweet Sixteen apple was developed at the University of Minnesota in 1977.

== Growing ==
=== Characteristics ===
The Sweet Sixteen is crisp and juicy, has an exotic yellow flesh, mixed with red. It is very sweet, with an unusual flavor of sugar cane, or spicy cherry candy. The fruit can store for 5 to 8 weeks. The Sweet Sixteen is quite vigorous. The fruit may have premature drops. Sweet Sixteen usually ripens, mid- to late September.

The Sweet Sixteen is resistant to fire blight and scab. Sweet Sixteen has fragrant, and long-lasting white flowers

=== Fruit ===
The fruit is medium size, the apple red striped. Sweet Sixteen has medium storage.

=== Tolerance of cold climates ===
The Sweet Sixteen is one of the best apples to endure cold climates.

=== USDA Hardiness Zone ===
Sweet Sixteen has USDA Hardiness Zone of Zones 4 to 7, so can withstand cold winters.

=== General disease resistance ===
The Sweet Sixteen has good disease resistance.

=== Soil ===
The Sweet Sixteen thrives in sandy loam to clay loam soil.

=== Tolerances ===
Sweet Sixteen is moderately drought tolerant.

=== Light range ===
Sweet Sixteen prefers full sun.

=== Preferred soil pH ===
Sweet Sixteen prefers a pH of 6.0—7.0.

=== Pollination ===
The Sweet Sixteen is not self-fertile, and may be pollinated by a variety of other apple cultivars.

=== Ripeness ===
The Sweet Sixteen ripens mid- to late September.

== External links and references ==
- On growing Sweet Sixteen apples
