= Haralson (apple) =

Apple cultivar

'Haralson' apple
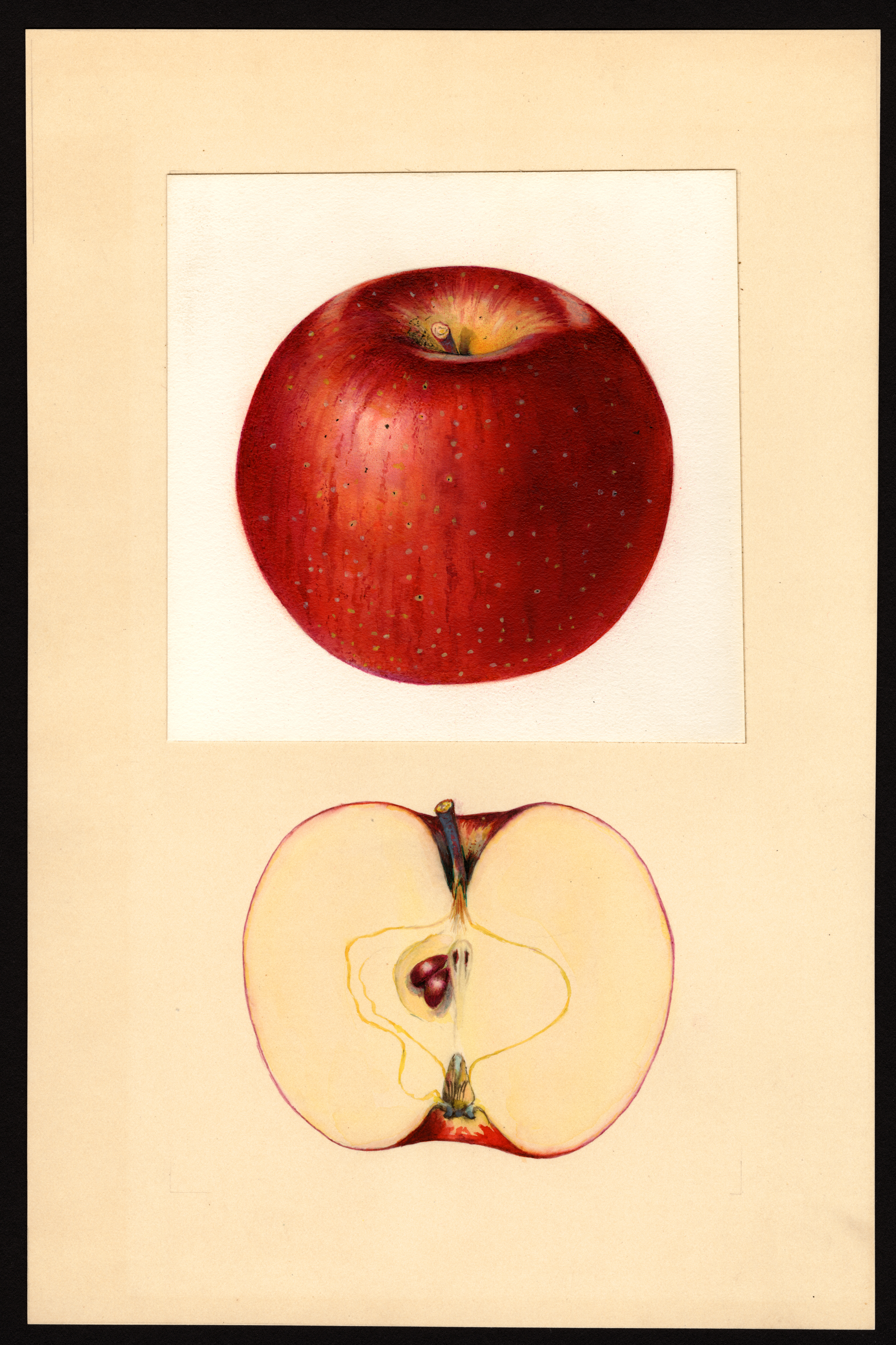
- Genus: Malus
- Species: Malus domestica
- Hybrid parentage: 'Malinda' & most likely Wealthy
- Cultivar: 'Haralson'
- Origin: USA, University of Minnesota, 1913

The Haralson is a cultivar of apple that is medium-sized and has a round-conic shape.

== Characteristics ==
It has a red color and large, moderately conspicuous lenticels. Haralson apples are crisp and juicy, having a tart flavor. They are good for eating, cooking, and are an excellent choice for pies. Haralson apples take longer to break down under heat compared to other apples. The skin is medium-tough, and the stem is medium.

== Background ==
The Haralson apple was introduced by the Minnesota Horticulture Research Center in 1922. It is named after Charles Haralson, superintendent of the University of Minnesota Fruit Breeding Farm.

== Pollination ==
The Haralson's parentage is Malinda open pollinated. DNA testing has shown that Wealthy is the likely pollen parent. The tree is hardy and vigorous, but relatively small. It has a strongly developed central leader and wide-angled lateral branches. The flowers bloom late, and the fruit ripens in early October.

== Information ==
The species of the Haralson apple is the Malus domestica. The origin of the apple was in Minnesota, United States in 1913.

== Details ==
The best planting season is in the Spring. The time that the tree produces fruit is between September and October. The foliage color is green. There are state restrictions in the states of California, Hawaii, Arizona, and Arkansas.

== See also ==
- Beacon (apple) - a cultivar of the same parentage
