= Ken Tschumper =

American politician (1950–2024)

Kenneth P. Tschumper (April 24, 1950 – December 19, 2024) was an American farmer and politician.

== Life and career ==
Born in La Crescent, Minnesota, Tschumper received his bachelor's degree from Winona State University and went to graduate school at Saint Mary's University of Minnesota. He was a dairy farmer. He served as a Democrat in the Minnesota House of Representatives from 2007 to 2009. Tschumper was a 2012 Democratic candidate for District 28B of the Minnesota House of Representatives. In 2014, he ran for Houston County commissioner. One of his main points is to ban frac sand. He owned a farm in LaCrescent, Minnesota, with 320 acres and 35 cows.

Tschumper died from cancer on December 19, 2024, at the age of 74.
