= John S. Harris (horticulturalist) =

American horticulturalist (1826-1901)

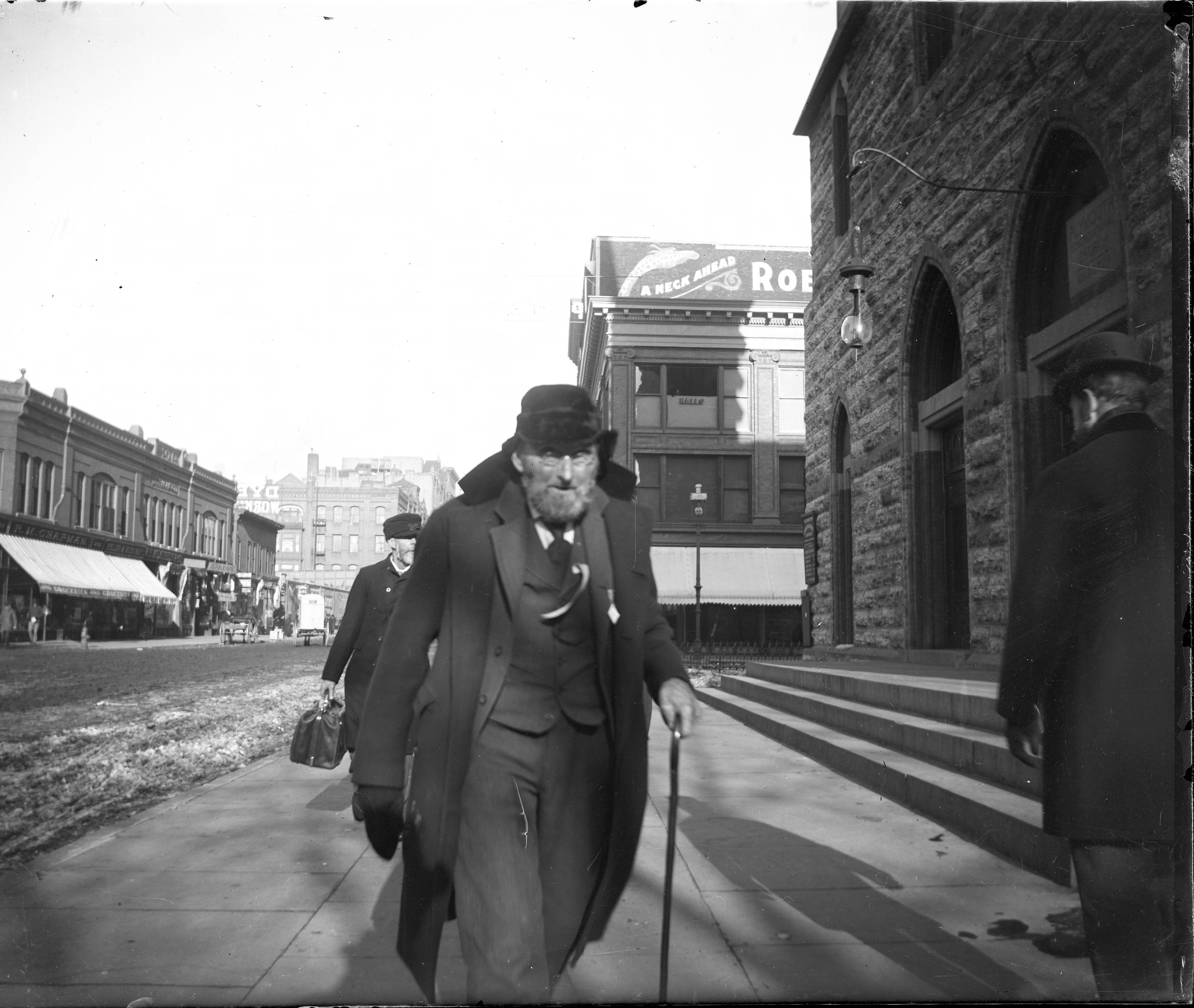
John S. Harris

John Samuel Harris (August 17, 1826 – March 24, 1901) was an early American horticulturist, the first person to successfully plant and propagate apple trees in Minnesota, a climate in which it was previously thought that the fruit could not survive the harsh northern U.S. winters.

Harris was born on a farm in Seville, Ohio. His father died in 1844, and 18-year-old John was apprenticed to a cabinetmaker. At age 21 Harris enlisted in the Army infantry, and participated in the war with Mexico.

Harris' health was poor in 1848 when the war ended, so he traveled to Wisconsin in hopes of finding a healthy climate. Still in poor health in 1851, Harris settled in La Crosse, Wisconsin, and in 1856 moved across the Mississippi River to La Crescent, Minnesota.

In La Crescent, Harris established Sunny Side Garden orchard, a 40-acre (16.2 ha) plot with apple, pear, plum, and cherry trees, along with other small fruits. Harris planted thousands of apple trees and hundreds of varieties. “A full half of which were complete and total failures,” he said. Harris was almost wiped out of the apple propagating business twice, in the winters of 1872-73 and 1884–85.

Harris planted apple tree starts sent from other states and then planted the seeds of apples which those trees bore before cold Minnesota winters set in. When the trees bore apples, Harris took the hardiest and replanted. He continued this selective planting to produce apple trees that could survive the Minnesota winter climate. His technique relied on the fact that trees grown from seed live longer than grafted trees or cutting grown trees; they are more vigorous and grow slightly larger. They are also stronger and hardier, and more likely to survive frosts.

Harris was a founding member of the Minnesota State Horticultural Society, in 1866. He displayed an exhibit on apple propagation at the 1893 Chicago World's Fair.

Harris died of influenza and typhoid fever at age 74, in 1901, in La Crescent, after a long illness. He is buried in Prospect Hill Cemetery in La Crescent.
