= La Crescent, Minnesota =

City in Minnesota, US

La Crescent
- City
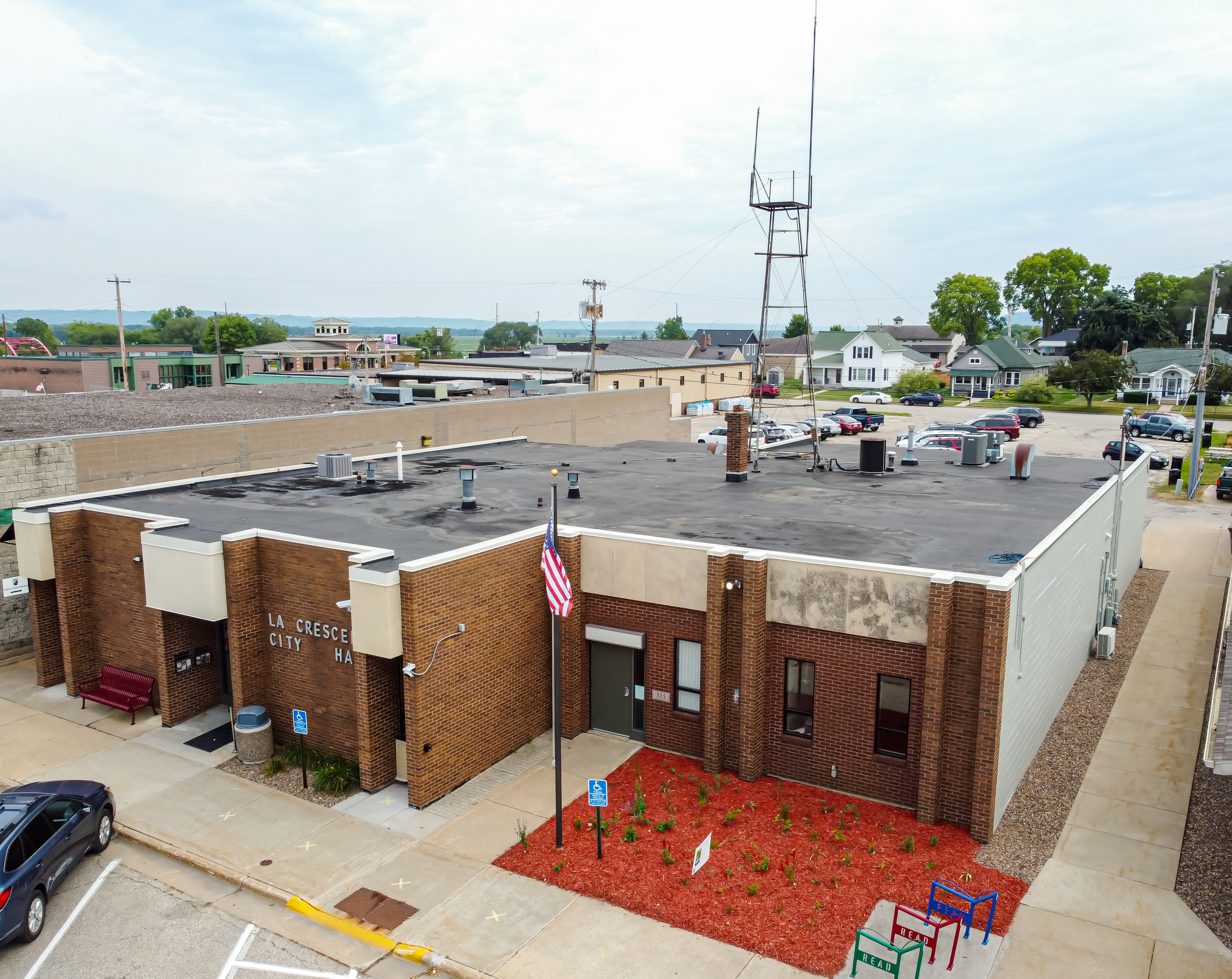
- City hall
- Nickname: "Apple Capital of Minnesota"
- Location of La Crescent within Houston and Winona Counties in the state of Minnesota
- Coordinates: 43°49′48″N 91°18′16″W
- Country: United States
- State: Minnesota
- Counties: Houston, Winona
- Founded: 1851

Government
  - Type: Mayor – Council
  - Mayor: Mike Poellinger

Area
  - City: 3.82 sq mi (9.90 km^{2})
  - Land: 3.32 sq mi (8.61 km^{2})
  - Water: 0.50 sq mi (1.29 km^{2})
- Elevation: 682 ft (208 m)

Population (2020)
  - City: 5,276
  - Estimate (2021): 5,274
  - Density: 1,586.7/sq mi (612.64/km^{2})
  - Metro: 170,341 (La Crosse-Onalaska WI-MN)
- Time zone: UTC-6 (CST)
  - Summer (DST): UTC-5 (CDT)
- ZIP code: 55947
- Area code: 507
- FIPS code: 27-33866
- GNIS feature ID: 2395562
- Website: cityoflacrescent-mn.gov

La Crescent (/lə ˈkrɛsənt/ lə KRESS-ənt) is a city in Houston and Winona counties in the U.S. state of Minnesota. The population was 5,276 at the 2020 census.

La Crescent is located in the northeast portion of Houston County; the northern edge of the city falls into Winona County. The city is known as the "Apple Capital of Minnesota" because John S. Harris planted apple trees here, resulting in many orchards in the present-day city. It is recognized as a 'Tree City' by the Arbor Day Foundation, and a 'Minnesota GreenStep City' by the Minnesota Pollution Control Agency.

== History ==
Lying on the west bank of the Mississippi River, the city is surrounded by bluffs with views of the river and abundant wildlife. Humans have inhabited this area for thousands of years. The most recent inhabitants before the arrival of white settlers were the Dakota people, a branch of the Sioux, and the Ho-Chunk, or Winnebago.

Following the 1803 Louisiana Purchase, Nathan Boone, youngest son of Daniel Boone, was among the early surveyors of this area. The various Indian tribes who had lived here were forced out and relocated in the 1840s to accommodate white settlement.

La Crescent was founded in 1851 by Peter and Emma Cameron, who called it "Camerons". The Camerons were two of the town's most colorful characters; he tried to dig a canal to change the flow of the Mississippi River so it would flow closer to La Crescent and bypass La Crosse, Wisconsin across the river. He died 10 weeks before its scheduled completion in 1857, and the canal was never finished, although the canal can still be seen in aerial photographs of the city. The Presbyterian missionary Sheldon Jackson lived in La Crescent prior to 1872, when he moved westward to Denver and later Alaska.

The second name of La Crescent was "Manton", named by William and Harvey Gillett, after they cleared the downtown area for settlement for Peter Cameron. In quick succession, the town's name was changed again by a somewhat unscrupulous land speculation venture, the Kentucky Land Company. They wanted a more romantic-sounding name for the town to attract settlers and came up with "La Crescent", after the bend or "crescent" shape of the Mississippi River around the town. La Crescent incorporated in 1857.

Horticulturalist John S. Harris arrived in La Crescent in 1856, who helped give the town its identity of "Apple Capital of Minnesota", a title that the city copyrighted in 2002. Despite the belief of "99 out of 100 people that apples could not grow in Minnesota", Harris planted the area's first apple trees in 1857, experimenting until he grew trees hardy enough to withstand Minnesota winters. He planted thousands of apple trees and hundreds of varieties, a full half of which he said were total failures. Harris became known as "Father of the Orchardists" in Minnesota, and was a founding member of the Minnesota State Horticultural Society.

== Geography ==
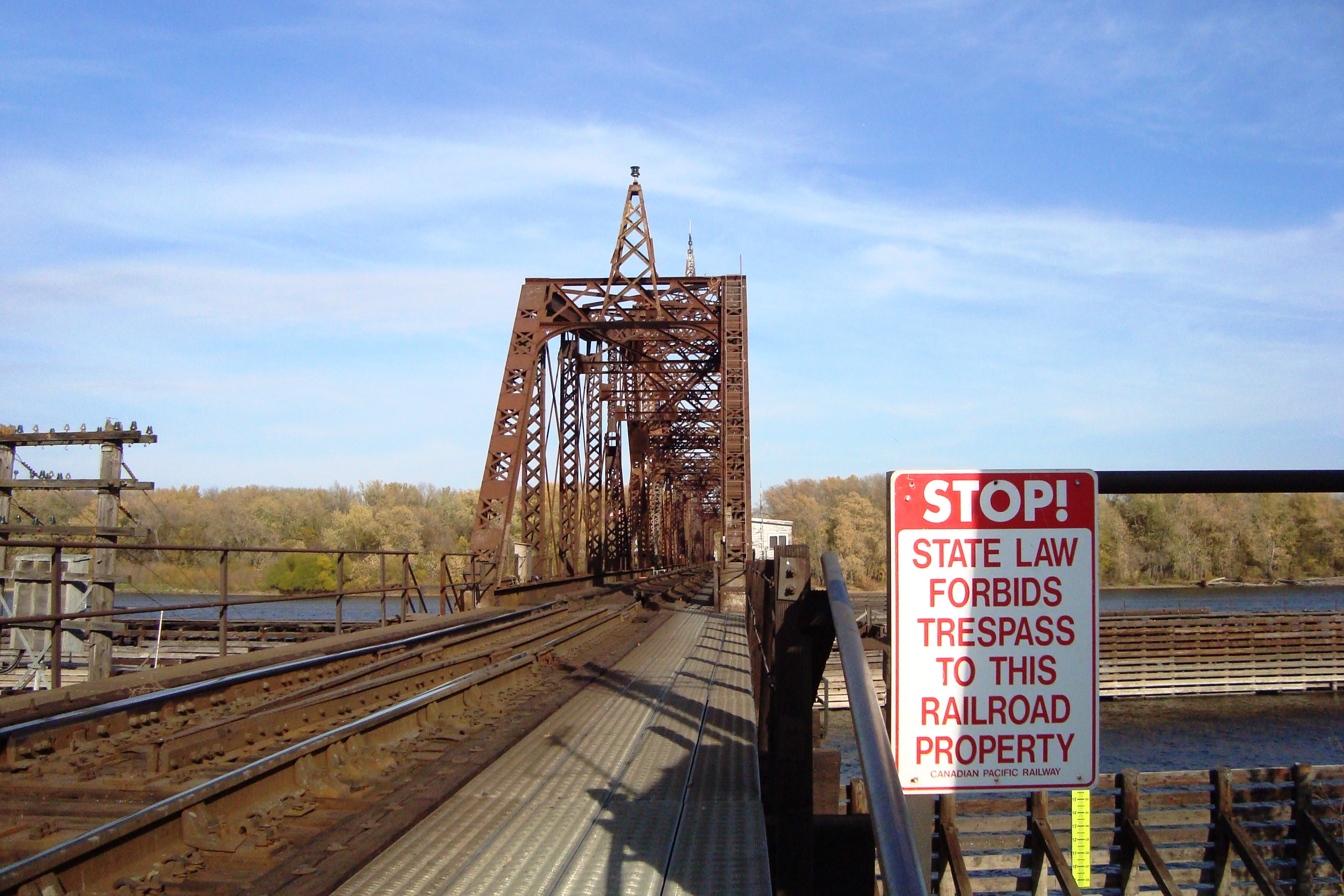
La Crescent MN swing bridge opened to river traffic

According to the United States Census Bureau, the city has a total area of 3.47 square miles (8.99 km^{2}); 2.94 square miles (7.61 km^{2}) is land and 0.53 square miles (1.37 km^{2}) is water.

La Crescent sits three miles southwest across the Mississippi River from Onalaska, Wisconsin and west of the northern part of La Crosse. Winona, Minnesota is 21 miles to the northwest of La Crescent. It is the largest city in Houston County and the second largest in Winona County.

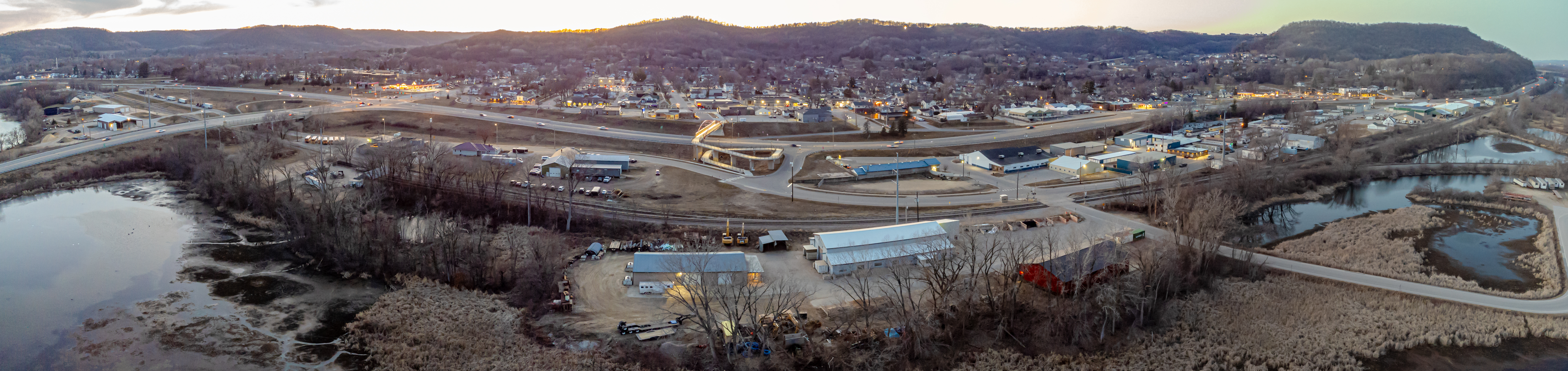

=== Bluffs ===
La Crescent is known for having more bluffs than most Minnesota cities. It lies on the side of a large bluff, with other large hills within the city. Since La Crescent is below the normal level of the rest of the area, the bluffside provides some protection from winds.

=== Lake ===
La Crescent sits next to Blue Lake, which the US Fish and Wildlife Service lists as a high quality wetland, due to its diverse species, with year-round fishing. Most visible around the lake are migratory bird species such as Wood Ducks, Ruddy Ducks, Hooded Mergansers, Least and American Bitterns, Common Morrhends, Night Herons, Sandhill Cranes, and Tundra Swans. In the early spring, the water appears clear, before natural aquatic vegetation grows over.

== Demographics ==
Historical population
Census	Pop.	Note	%±
1870	380		—
1880	326		−14.2%
1910	372		—
1920	373		0.3%
1930	520		39.4%
1940	815		56.7%
1950	1,229		50.8%
1960	2,624		113.5%
1970	3,296		25.6%
1980	3,674		11.5%
1990	4,311		17.3%
2000	4,923		14.2%
2010	4,830		−1.9%
2020	5,276		9.2%
2021 (est.)	5,274		0.0%
U.S. Decennial Census; 2020 Census

=== 2020 census ===
As of the 2020 census, La Crescent had a population of 5,276. The median age was 43.6 years. 22.1% of residents were under the age of 18 and 21.6% of residents were 65 years of age or older. For every 100 females there were 95.6 males, and for every 100 females age 18 and over there were 91.4 males age 18 and over.

98.6% of residents lived in urban areas, while 1.4% lived in rural areas.

There were 2,303 households in La Crescent, of which 26.8% had children under the age of 18 living in them. Of all households, 50.4% were married-couple households, 15.8% were households with a male householder and no spouse or partner present, and 27.0% were households with a female householder and no spouse or partner present. About 30.6% of all households were made up of individuals and 15.9% had someone living alone who was 65 years of age or older.

There were 2,459 housing units, of which 6.3% were vacant. The homeowner vacancy rate was 0.9% and the rental vacancy rate was 10.1%.

Racial composition as of the 2020 census
Race	Number	Percent
White	4,884	92.6%
Black or African American	37	0.7%
American Indian and Alaska Native	20	0.4%
Asian	64	1.2%
Native Hawaiian and Other Pacific Islander	4	0.1%
Some other race	29	0.5%
Two or more races	238	4.5%
Hispanic or Latino (of any race)	92	1.7%

=== 2010 census ===
As of the census of 2010, there were 4,830 people, 2,012 households, and 1,370 families in the city. The population density was 1,642.9 inhabitants per square mile (634.3/km^{2}). There were 2,126 housing units at an average density of 723.1 per square mile (279.2/km^{2}). The racial makeup of the city was 96.5% White, 0.8% African American, 0.1% Native American, 0.6% Asian, 0.1% from other races, and 1.8% from two or more races. Hispanic or Latino of any race were 1.1% of the population.

There were 2,012 households, of which 30.7% had children under the age of 18 living with them, 55.2% were married couples living together, 10.0% had a female householder with no husband present, 2.9% had a male householder with no wife present, and 31.9% were non-families. 27.1% of all households were made up of individuals, and 12% had someone living alone who was 65 years of age or older. The average household size was 2.37 and the average family size was 2.86.

The median age in the city was 42.8 years. 23.5% of residents were under the age of 18; 6.8% were between the ages of 18 and 24; 22.7% were from 25 to 44; 30.4% were from 45 to 64; and 16.6% were 65 years of age or older. The gender makeup of the city was 47.7% male and 52.3% female.

=== 2000 census ===
As of the census of 2000, there were 4,923 people, 1,940 households, and 1,367 families in the city. The population density was 1,634.4 inhabitants per square mile (631.0/km^{2}). There were 2,014 housing units at an average density of 668.6 per square mile (258.1/km^{2}). The racial makeup of the city was 97.60% White, 0.43% African American, 0.08% Native American, 0.87% Asian, 0.08% from other races, and 0.93% from two or more races. Hispanic or Latino of any race were 0.73% of the population.

There were 1,940 households, out of which 35.0% had children under the age of 18 living with them, 59.1% were married couples living together, 8.8% had a female householder with no husband present, and 29.5% were non-families. 26.0% of all households were made up of individuals, and 11.3% had someone living alone who was 65 years of age or older. The average household size was 2.49 and the average family size was 3.02.

The city population contained 27.3% under the age of 18, 7.1% from 18 to 24, 28.6% from 25 to 44, 21.2% from 45 to 64, and 15.8% above age 64. The median age was 38 years. For every 100 females, there were 92.9 males. For every 100 females over age 17, there were 89.1 males.

The median income for a household in the city was $45,433, and the median income for a family was $54,708. Males had a median income of $40,316 versus $24,308 for females. The per capita income for the city was $21,361. About 0.8% of families and 3.9% of the population were below the poverty line, including 1.9% of those under age 18 and 12.8% of those above age 64.

== Education ==
The La Crescent–Hokah Public Schools is the city's largest public school district, and Melinda Crowley is superintendent (February 2023). It includes La Crescent–Hokah Elementary School and La Crescent–Hokah Secondary School. The other public school district, La Crescent Montessori Academy & STEM school, serves grades pre-k through 12th grade under Head of School, Thomas Pollreis. Other educational opportunities include the private school Crucifixion Catholic Elementary. The La Crescent Public Library serves the local community.

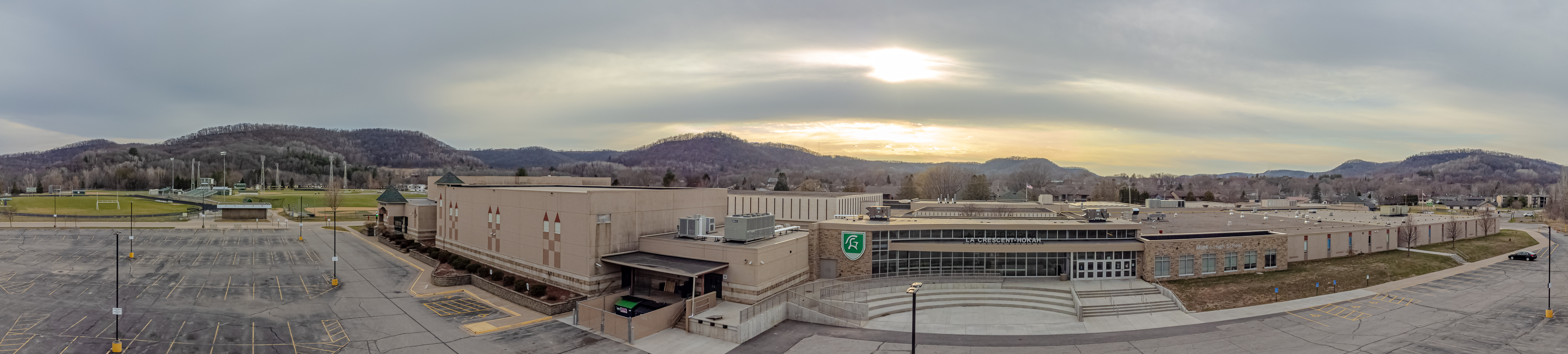
La Crescent - Hokah High School

== Notable people ==
- Siri Carpenter (born 1971), science journalist, editor
- Eriah Hayes (born 1988), professional hockey player, current boys hockey coach at LCHS
- Sheldon Jackson (1834–1909), Presbyterian minister, missionary, political leader
- Marguerite Kerrigan (1931–2022), All-American Girls Professional Baseball League player
- Peter Pernin Pastor (1822–1909), survivor and memoirist of the Peshtigo fire
- Michelle Rifenberg (born 1957), Minnesota politician
- Ken Tschumper (1950–2024), Minnesota politician and farmer
- Al W. Wieser, Jr. (born 1949), Minnesota state legislator and businessman

== Infrastructure ==
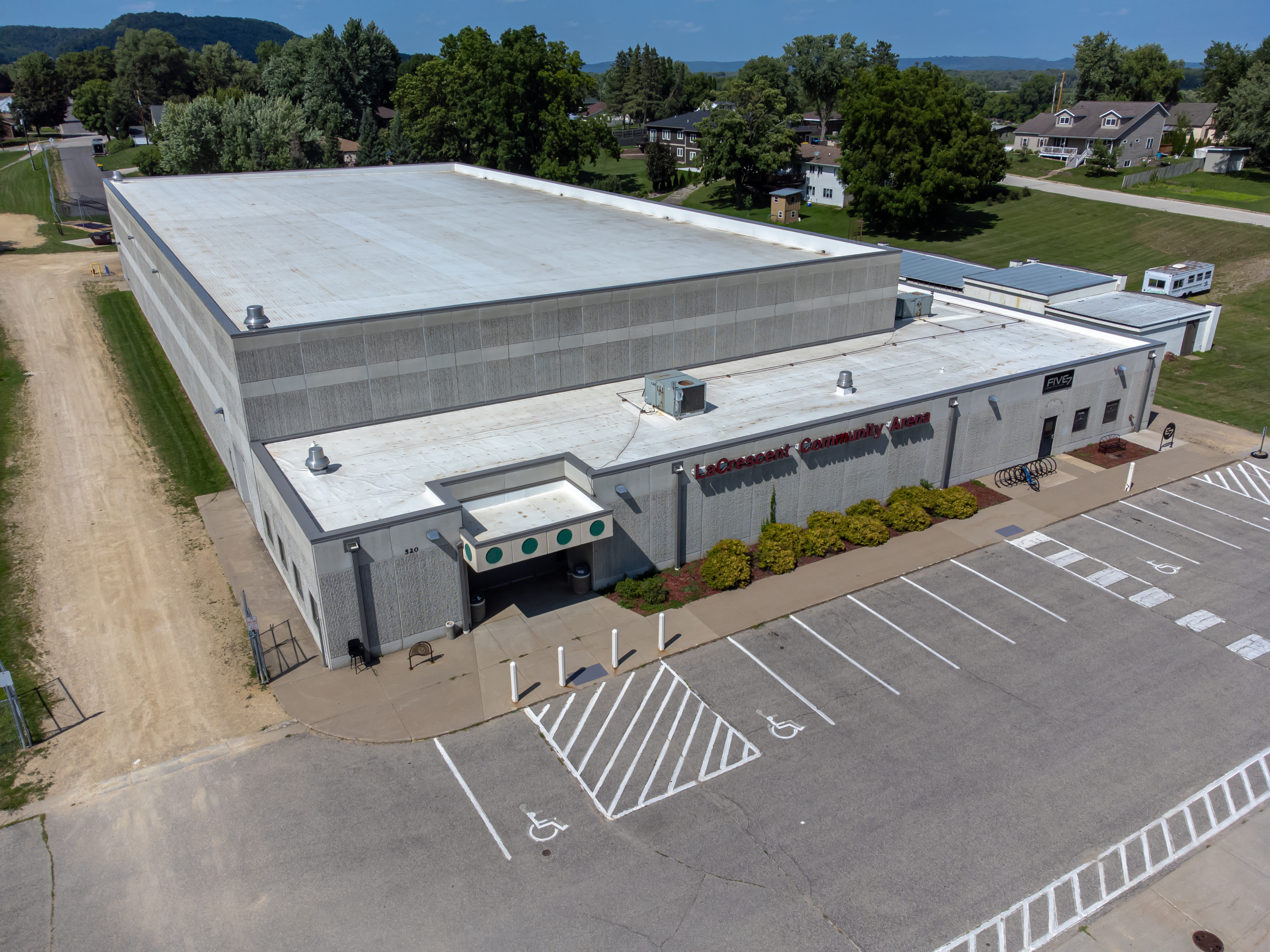
La Crescent Community Arena

=== Transportation ===
U.S. Highways 14 and 61; and Minnesota State Highway 16 serve as main routes in the community. The northern edge of La Crescent is skirted by Interstate 90 and I-90 Mississippi River Bridge. The Great River Road, a collection of state and local roads that follow the course of the Mississippi River, passes through La Crescent via US 61 and a short piece of MN 16.

Bus service to La Crosse is operated by La Crosse MTU and has 13 trips daily through La Crescent.

A pedestrian pathway known as the Wagon Wheel Trail connects La Crescent and most notably Mississippi River Trail to La Crosse and several trails in the Wisconsin bike trail system, notably the Great River Trail.

== See also ==
- La Crescent Township
