= Minnesota State Horticultural Society =

Horticultural society

The Minnesota State Horticultural Society (MSHS), with headquarters in Roseville, Minnesota, is a nonprofit membership organization that provides education and resources to northern gardeners in the United States. It publishes Northern Gardener, a bi-monthly magazine that is the only U.S. publication devoted exclusively to gardening in Hardiness Zones 3-5. Its "Garden-in-a-Box" program provides raised bed garden boxes, along with soil and vegetable plants, to low-income families and schoolchildren in the greater Minneapolis and St. Paul, Minnesota area and elsewhere in Minnesota. "Minnesota Green" is a MSHS program that coordinates donations of plant material from growers, garden centers, and individuals to public space and community gardens. MSHS offers classes year-round on gardening subjects. MSHS currently has 10,000 members and subscribers to its publication.

== History ==
MSHS was founded in 1866 as the Minnesota Fruit Growers Association during a meeting of orchard owners at the Minnesota State Fair held in Rochester, Minnesota. The original purpose of this group was to share information on how to successfully grow apples and other fruit in Minnesota. Daniel A. Robertson helped found the society and was elected as their first President. In 1868, the name of the organization was changed to the Minnesota Horticultural Society, and in 1872 the Society took over management of the horticulture department at the Minnesota State Fair. In 1873, the Society incorporated under the general statutes of the state of Minnesota as the Minnesota State Horticultural Society. That same year, the Minnesota legislature approved an act that provided funds to produce and distribute 2000 copies of the MSHS annual reports from 1866-1873, and further provided an appropriation for distribution of future annual reports to members. In 1894, the Society began publishing its transactions in a monthly magazine called The Minnesota Horticulturist.

In 1878, MSHS secured passage of a legislative act establishing the Minnesota Fruit Farm, an experiment station in Minnetonka, MN designed for breeding new varieties of hardy fruits adapted to Minnesota’s climate. This was the first tax-supported fruit breeding station in the U.S. The station’s superintendent was Peter Gideon, creator of the Wealthy apple. In 1883, the Society established its own system of experiment stations for growing seedlings and testing new varieties of fruit trees, with various stations created throughout Minnesota. In 1919 the Society moved its headquarters from Minneapolis to the St. Paul campus of the University of Minnesota.

In 1955 MSHS began a cooperative relationship with the University of Minnesota and formed a committee to study the need for an arboretum and for increased research in the field of hardy, woody perennials. A "Landscape Arboretum Project" was authorized, and the committee began a public campaign to raise funds for tf a 160-acre tract of land near Excelsior, Minnesota where the arboretum was to be built. The finance campaign was successful, and on February 6. 1958, the University accepted a deed to the property that became the location of the Minnesota Landscape Arboretum.

In 1993, MSHS relocated from the University of Minnesota campus to a facility in Falcon Heights, Minnesota, and in December, 2009 moved to its current location at 2705 Lincoln Dr. Roseville, Minnesota. In 2000 the name of the MSHS publication was changed from Minnesota Horticulturist to Northern Gardener.
