= List of county roads in Winona County, Minnesota =

Highway names
- Interstates: Interstate X (I-X)
- US Highways: U.S. Highway X (US X)
- State: Trunk Highway X (MN X or TH X)
- County State-Aid Highways: County State-Aid Highway X (CSAH X)
- County Roads: County Road X (CR X)

System links
- County roads of Minnesota; Winona County

The following is a list of county-maintained roads in Winona County, Minnesota, United States. Some of the routes included in this list are also county-state-aid-highways (CSAH.)

== Route list ==
Number	Length (mi)	Length (km)	Southern or western terminus	Northern or eastern terminus	Local names	Formed	Removed	Notes
CSAH 1	—	—	Houston County line (County 29)	CSAH 12 in New Hartford Township		—	—	
CSAH 2	—	—	CSAH 29 in Fremont Township	Fillmore County line (County 27)		—	—	
CSAH 3	—	—	CSAH 12 in New Hartford Township	US 14 and US 61 in Richmond Township		—	—	
CSAH 4	—	—	MN 43 in Hart Township	CSAH 17 in Wiscoy Township		—	—	
CSAH 5	—	—	Houston County line (County 6)	CSAH 12 in New Hartford Township		—	—	
CSAH 6	—	—	MN 74 in Saratoga Township	CSAH 29 in Fremont Township		—	—	
CSAH 7	—	—	CSAH 12 in Pleasant Hill Township	US 14 and US 61 in Richmond Township		—	—	
CSAH 8	—	—	CSAH 11 in Pleasant Hill Township	CSAH 5 in New Hartford Township		—	—	
CSAH 9	—	—	CSAH 12 and CSAH 17 in Wilson Township	US 14 and US 61 in Homer Township		—	—	
CSAH 10	—	—	Olmsted County line (County 30)	MN 74 in Saratoga Township		—	—	
CSAH 11	—	—	Houston County line (County 9)	CSAH 12 in Pleasant Hill Township		—	—	
CSAH 12	—	—	CSAH 25 in Warren Township	CSAH 12 in Dakota		—	—	Western segment
CSAH 12	—	—	US 14 and US 61 in Dakota	I-90, US 14, and US 61 in Dresbach Township		—	—	Eastern segment
CSAH 13	—	—	Houston County line (County 26)	CSAH 11 in Pleasant Hill Township		—	—	
CSAH 14	—	—	CSAH 33 in Utica Township	CSAH 29 in Utica Township		—	—	
CSAH 15	—	—	CSAH 17 in Wilson Township	CSAH 17 in Winona		—	—	
CSAH 16	—	—	Houston County line (County 30)	CSAH 12 in New Hartford Township		—	—	
CSAH 17	—	—	MN 76 in Wiscoy Township	MN 43 in Winona		—	—	
CSAH 18	—	—	US 14 in Utica	CSAH 29 in Utica Township		—	—	
CSAH 19	—	—	CSAH 17 in Wiscoy Township	I-90 and MN 43 in Wilson Township		—	—	
CSAH 20	—	—	CSAH 27 in Norton Township	US 14 in Stockton		—	—	
CSAH 21	—	—	MN 43 in Wilson Township	US 14 in Winona		—	—	
CSAH 22	—	—	Olmsted County line (County 9)	MN 74 in Elba Township		—	—	
CSAH 23	—	—	CSAH 25 in Warren Township	US 61 in Minnesota City		—	—	
CSAH 24	—	—	CSAH 39 in Elba Township	CSAH 37 in Elba Township		—	—	
CSAH 25	—	—	Fillmore County line (County 27)	CSAH 25 in Minneiska		—	—	Southern segment
CSAH 25	—	—	Wabasha County line	US 61 in Minneiska		—	—	Northern segment
CSAH 26	—	—	Wabasha County line (County 25)	MN 248 in Altura		—	—	
CSAH 27	—	—	CSAH 33 in Altura	MN 248 in Norton Township		—	—	
CSAH 28	—	—	CSAH 31 in Mount Vernon Township	CSAH 25 in Mount Vernon Township		—	—	
CSAH 29	—	—	Fillmore County line (County 25)	CSAH 25 in Lewiston		—	—	
CSAH 30	—	—	Wabasha County line (County 8)	CSAH 31 in Whitewater Township		—	—	
CSAH 31	—	—	MN 248 in Norton Township	Wabasha County line (County 29)		—	—	
CSAH 32	—	—	US 61 in Goodview	MN 43 in Winona		—	—	
CSAH 33	—	—	Filmore County line (County 32)	MN 248 in Altura		—	—	
CSAH 35	—	—	Olmsted County line (County 29)	CSAH 6 in Saratoga Township		—	—	
CSAH 37	—	—	CSAH 35 in St. Charles Township	CSAH 26 in Elba Township		—	—	
CSAH 39	—	—	MN 74 in St. Charles Township	Olmsted County line (County 2)		—	—	
CSAH 41	—	—	Wabasha County line (County 27)	Wabasha County line (County 26)		—	—	
CSAH 43	—	—	Fillmore County line (County 11)	CSAH 6 in Saratoga Township		—	—	
CSAH 44	—	—	CSAH 21 in Wilson Township	US 14 and US 61 in Winona		—	—	
CSAH 54	—	—	US 61 in Goodview	CSAH 32 in Goodview		—	—	
CR 101	—	—	Dakota Valley Drive in New Hartford Township	CSAH 12 in Dakota		—	—	
CR 102	—	—	CSAH 25 in Hart Township	MN 43 in Hart Township		—	—	
CR 103	—	—	Houston County line	CSAH 11 in Pleasant Hill Township		—	—	
CR 104	—	—	CSAH 11 in Pleasant Hill Township	CSAH 12 in New Hartford Township		—	—	
CR 105	—	—	CSAH 12 in Wilson Township	MN 43 in Winona		—	—	
CR 106	—	—	CSAH 29 in Utica Township	CSAH 25 in Lewiston		—	—	
CR 108	—	—	CSAH 39 in Elba Township	CSAH 37 in Elba Township		—	—	
CR 109	—	—	CSAH 25 in Hart Township	CSAH 29 in Fremont Township		—	—	
CR 110	—	—	CSAH 25 in St. Charles Township	CSAH 23 in Hillsdale Township		—	—	
CR 111	—	—	CSAH 6 in Fremont Township	CSAH 29 in Fremont Township		—	—	
CR 112	—	—	CSAH 37 in Elba Township	Dead End in Elba Township		—	—	Western segment
CR 112	—	—	Township Road in Elba Township	MN 248 in Altura		—	—	Eastern segment
CR 113	—	—	CSAH 33 in Saratoga Township	CSAH 6 in Saratoga Township		—	—	
CR 114	—	—	CSAH 26 in Elba Township	CSAH 25 in Mount Vernon Township		—	—	
CR 115	—	—	US 14 in St. Charles Township	CSAH 37 in St. Charles Township		—	—	
CR 116	—	—	CSAH 41 in Whitewater Township	CSAH 30 in Whitewater Township		—	—	
CR 117	—	—	CSAH 6 in Saratoga Township	CSAH 35 in St. Charles Township		—	—	
CR 119	—	—	US 14 in St. Charles	CSAH 39 in St. Charles Township		—	—	
CR 120	—	—	US 14 in Warren Township	US 14 in Warren Township		—	—	
CR 122	—	—	CSAH 15 in Homer Township	Dead End in Homer Township		—	—	
CR 123	—	—	CSAH 6 in Saratoga Township	CSAH 35 in Saratoga Township		—	—	
CR 124	—	—	Fillmore County line	CR 113 in Saratoga Township		—	—	
CR 125	—	—	CSAH 5 in New Hartford Township	CR 104 in New Hartford Township		—	—	
CR 129	—	—	US 61 in Goodview	US 61 in Goodview		—	—	
