= Clyde, Minnesota =

Unincorporated community in Minnesota, United States

Clyde
- Unincorporated community
- Location within Minnesota Location within the United States
- Coordinates: 43°53′41″N 91°58′46″W
- Country: United States
- State: Minnesota
- County: Winona County
- Township: Saratoga Township
- Elevation: 1,168 ft (356 m)
- Time zone: UTC-6 (Central (CST))
  - Summer (DST): UTC-5 (CDT)
- ZIP code: 55979
- Area code: 507
- GNIS feature ID: 654647

Clyde is an unincorporated community in Saratoga Township, Winona County, Minnesota, United States.

The community is located southeast of St. Charles, at the junction of Winona County Roads 6 and 35.

Nearby places include Utica, St. Charles, Lewiston, Fremont, Saratoga, Troy, and Lanesboro.

The former hall for Evergreen Masonic Lodge No. 46 was located at Clyde. The remains of the country school house are also nearby.
