= List of ghost towns in Minnesota =

This is an incomplete list of ghost towns in Minnesota, a northern state in the United States of America.

- Ashton
- Belden
- Betcher
- Bodum
- Bruce
- Carnegie
- Cazenovia
- Chengwatana
- Chippewa City
- Cisco
- Clayton
- Clear Grit
- Colvill
- Constance
- Coopers Corner
- Costin Village
- Cuba
- Dale
- Dickinson
- Elcor
- Elliota
- Enterprise
- Fairland
- Fairpoint
- Fermoy
- Finland
- Florence, Goodhue County
- Forestville (see also Forestville Mystery Cave State Park)
- Frankford Village
- Garen
- Grover
- Harlis
- Hereford
- Homedahl
- Lake Addie
- Leaf River
- Lewiston
- London
- Lude
- Mallard
- Manganese
- Muskoda
- New Prairie
- Nininger
- Oak Lake
- Old Crow Wing
- Old Wadena
- Parkton
- Pelan
- Pitt
- Point Douglas
- Pomme de Terre
- Rice Lake
- San Francisco
- Shell City
- Spina
- Splitrock
- Thorsborg
- Topelius
- Vicksburg
- West Newton
- Whitewater Falls
- Williamsburg
- Winner
- Winnipeg Junction
- Withrow
