= Enterprise, Minnesota =

Ghost town in Utica Township, Minnesota, US

Coordinates: 43°56′5″N 91°51′40″W

Enterprise is an abandoned townsite in section 36 of Utica Township, in Winona County, Minnesota, United States.

== History ==
Enterprise was founded by Alexander Whittier, who established three inns at the roadside in the 1850s. A mill and dam were built by Nathan B. Ufford in 1854, and a post office was opened in Luther C. Rice's general store in 1858. The town and post office were known as Neoca (Neoca is believed to be the name of a young Winnebago Indian woman), until 1860, when the name Enterprise was adopted. Enterprise's Post Office was then relocated to new Postmaster Nathan B. Ufford's mill. A number of businesses operated in Enterprise, most notably the mill, a match factory, and a lime kiln, but with the development of nearby Lewiston four miles to the north, the town dwindled, and eventually the post office was discontinued in 1901. Luther Rice's general store exists to this day, although it was relocated approximately 1/2 mile west from its original location, and is now called the Fremont Store. A Masonic Lodge was also chartered in Enterprise. Harmony Lodge #43 was chartered in 1863, but moved to Lewiston in 1868.

A rest area on Interstate 90 took its name from the former town.
