= Bethany, Minnesota =

Unincorporated community in Minnesota, United States

Bethany
- Unincorporated community
- Location within Minnesota Location within the United States
- Coordinates: 44°01′27″N 91°54′42″W
- Country: United States
- State: Minnesota
- County: Winona County
- Township: Norton Township
- Elevation: 1,217 ft (371 m)
- Time zone: UTC-6 (Central (CST))
  - Summer (DST): UTC-5 (CDT)
- ZIP code: 55910
- Area code: 507
- GNIS feature ID: 639991

Bethany is an unincorporated community in Norton Township, Winona County, Minnesota, United States.

The community is located along Winona County Road 20, near its junction with County Road 27.

County Road 33 is also in the immediate area. Nearby places include Altura, Utica, Lewiston, and Rollingstone.

Bethany was organized in 1867, and developed when the former Chicago Great Western Railroad came in 1889; it was platted in 1891 for the Winona Southwestern Improvement Company. Bethany had a post office from 1890 to 1920. It is named for the former Bethanian Moravian Church in the community.
