= Oakridge, Minnesota =

Unincorporated community in Minnesota, United States

Oakridge
- Unincorporated community
- Location within Minnesota Location within the United States
- Coordinates: 44°07′15″N 91°55′12″W
- Country: United States
- State: Minnesota
- County: Winona
- Elevation: 1,224 ft (373 m)
- Time zone: UTC-6 (Central (CST))
  - Summer (DST): UTC-5 (CDT)
- Area code: 507
- GNIS feature ID: 654856

Oakridge (also Oak Ridge) is an unincorporated community in Mount Vernon Township, Winona County, Minnesota, United States.
