= Elmer Eric Schattschneider =

American political scientist (1892-1971)

- Born: Elmer Eric Schattschneider; August 11, 1892; Bethany, Minnesota, U.S.
- Died: March 4, 1971 (aged 78); Old Saybrook, Connecticut, U.S.
- Education: University of Wisconsin; University of Pittsburgh; Columbia University
- Known for: The Semisovereign People; Research on political parties in the United States
- Awards: Freedoms Foundation Award; James L. McConaughy Memorial Award
- Scientific career
- Fields: Political science
- Workplaces: Wesleyan University

Elmer Eric Schattschneider (August 11, 1892 – March 4, 1971) was an American political scientist.

== Life and career ==
Schattschneider was born in Bethany, Minnesota. He received his AB at the University of Wisconsin, MA at the University of Pittsburgh, and his PhD at Columbia University. He taught at Columbia, the New Jersey College for Women (now a section of Rutgers University), and Wesleyan University (1930–1960). Schattschneider was president of the American Political Science Association between 1956 and 1957 and is the namesake of its award for the best dissertation in the field of American politics. He died in Old Saybrook, Connecticut.

== Publications ==
Schattschneider's books include Politics, Pressures and the Tariff (1935), Party Government (1942), The Struggle for Party Government, (1948), Equilibrium and Change in American Politics (1958), The Semisovereign People: A Realist's View of Democracy in America (1960) (for a discussion see: Mair, 1997), and Two Hundred Million Americans in Search of a Government (1969).

== Critique of pluralism ==
Along with the political scientist Theodore J. Lowi, Schattschneider offered perhaps "the most devastating" critique of the American political theory of pluralism: Rather than an essentially democratic system in which the many competing interests of citizens are amply represented, if not advanced, by equally many competing interest groups, Schattschneider argued the pressure system is biased in favor of "the most educated and highest-income members of society", and showed that "the difference between those who participate in interest group activity and those who stand at the sidelines is much greater than that between voters and nonvoters."

In The Semisovereign People, Schattschneider argued the scope of the pressure system is really quite small: The "range of organized, identifiable, known groups is amazingly narrow; there is nothing remotely universal about it" and the "business or upper-class bias of the pressure system shows up everywhere." He says the "notion that the pressure system is automatically representative of the whole community is a myth" and, instead, the "system is skewed, loaded and unbalanced in favor of a fraction of a minority." And "the flaw in the pluralist heaven is that the heavenly chorus sings with a strong upper-class accent."
