= Whitman, Minnesota =

Unincorporated community in Minnesota, United States

Whitman
- Unincorporated community
- Location within Minnesota Location within the United States
- Coordinates: 44°09′12″N 91°48′22″W
- Country: United States
- State: Minnesota
- County: Winona
- Elevation: 673 ft (205 m)
- Time zone: UTC-6 (Central (CST))
  - Summer (DST): UTC-5 (CDT)
- Area code: 507
- GNIS feature ID: 655009

Whitman is an unincorporated community in Rollingstone Township, Winona County, Minnesota, United States.

== Transportation ==
Amtrak’s Empire Builder, which operates between Seattle/Portland and Chicago, passes through the town on BNSF tracks, but makes no stop. The nearest station is located in Winona, 11 miles (18 km) to the south.
