= Fremont, Minnesota =

Unincorporated community in Minnesota, United States

Fremont
- Unincorporated community
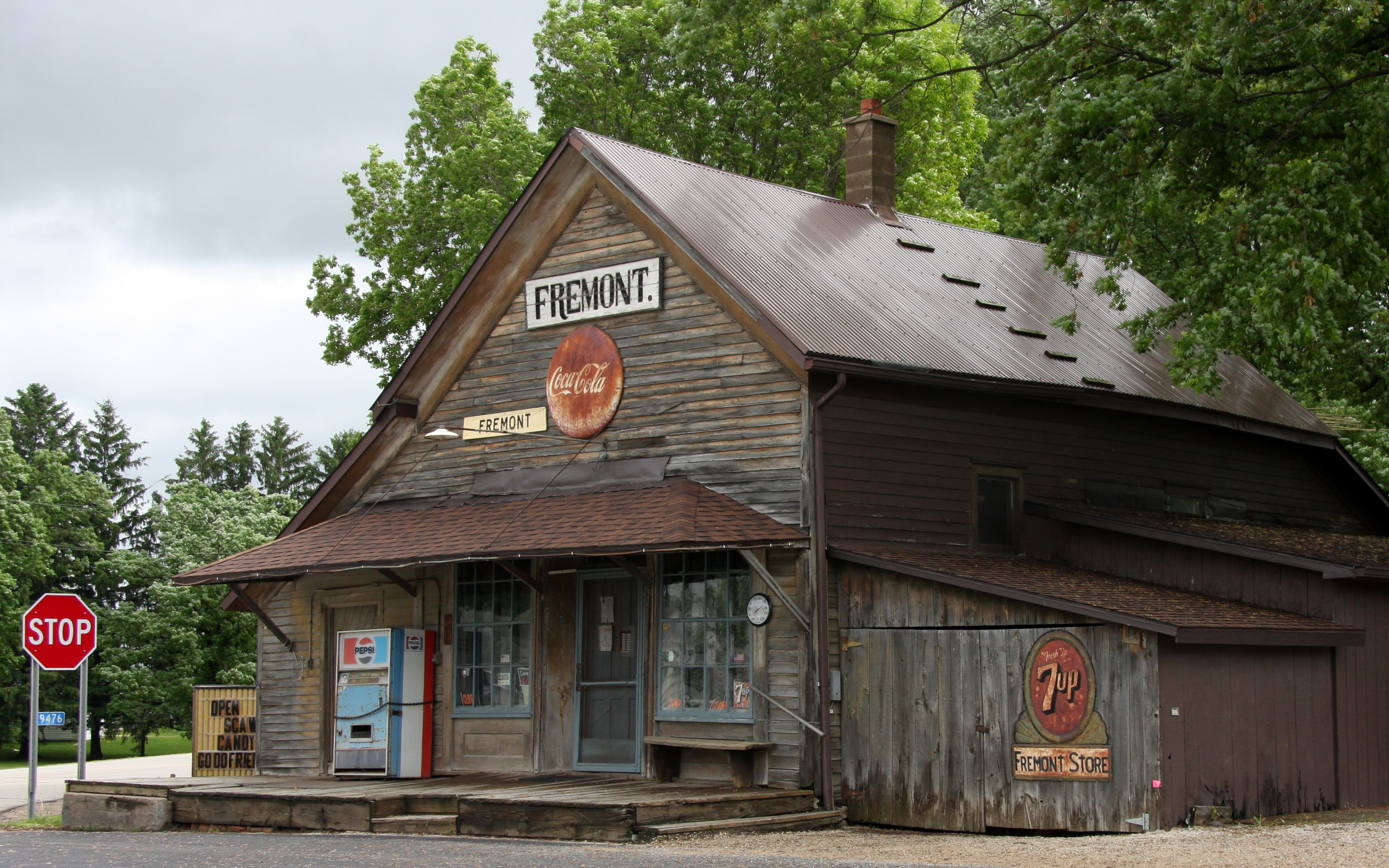
- Historic Fremont Store

- Location within Minnesota Location within the United States
- Coordinates: 43°54′50″N 91°53′57″W
- Country: United States
- State: Minnesota
- County: Winona County
- Township: Fremont Township
- Elevation: 1,188 ft (362 m)
- Time zone: UTC-6 (Central (CST))
  - Summer (DST): UTC-5 (CDT)
- ZIP code: 55979
- Area code: 507
- GNIS feature ID: 643929

Fremont is an unincorporated community in Fremont Township, Winona County, Minnesota, United States.

The community is located along Winona County Road 29, near its junction with County Road 6, two miles south-southwest of Interstate 90. Nearby places include Utica, Lewiston, St. Charles, Peterson, and Troy.

Fremont contains the town hall for Fremont Township, and a general store which appears much as it did when it was built in 1856. It also has an old creamery building and a historic school.

Fremont had a post office from 1876 to 1910. It is named for John C. Fremont, who stayed in the community for a short time while campaigning for President of the United States.

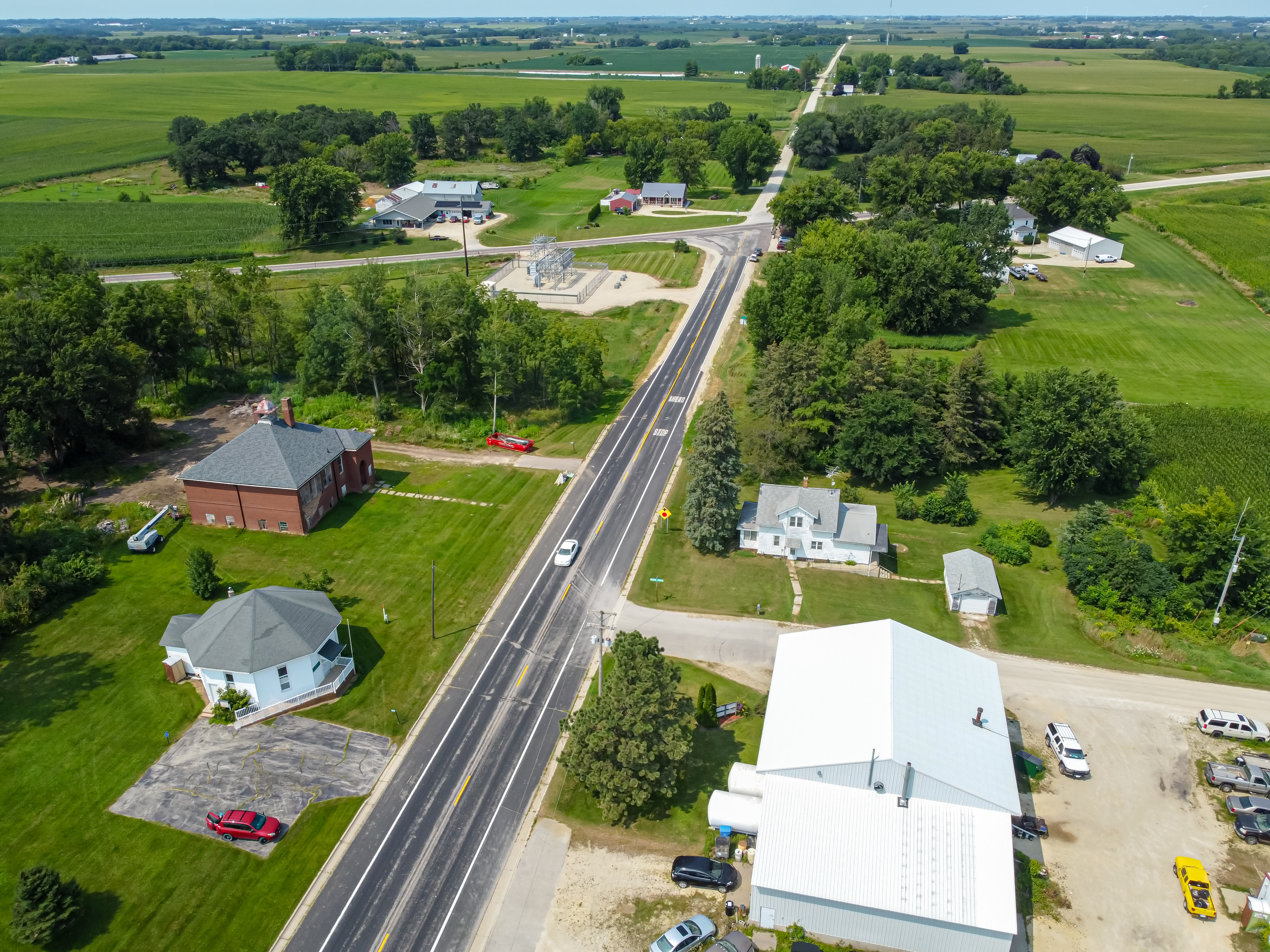
