= Clark William Trisler =

American politician (1840–1921)

Member of the Minnesota House of Representatives from the 7th district
- In office January 7, 1873 – January 5, 1874

Personal details
- Born: November 8, 1840 Ohio, U.S.
- Died: February 26, 1921 (aged 80)
- Resting place: Whitewater Falls Cemetery, Whitewater Falls, Minnesota, U.S.
- Party: Republican
- Spouse: Mary M. Sargent (m. 1864)
- Children: 6
- Occupation: Politician, farmer

Clark William "C.W." Trisler (November 8, 1840 – February 26, 1921) was an American politician and farmer who served in the Minnesota House of Representatives from 1873 to 1874, representing the 7th legislative district of Minnesota as a Republican in the 15th Minnesota Legislature.

== Early life and education ==
Trisler was born on November 8, 1840, in Ohio, where he attended higher schools. He came to Minnesota in 1868 and settled in Whitewater Falls, Minnesota, where he engaged in farming.

== Career ==
Trisler served in the Minnesota House of Representatives from 1873 to 1874, representing the 7th legislative district of Minnesota as a Republican in the 15th Minnesota Legislature.

During his time in office, Trisler served on the following committees:

- Agriculture and Manufactures
- Enrollment

Trisler's tenure began on January 7, 1873, and concluded on January 5, 1874. His district included representation for Winona County.

Outside of the Minnesota Legislature, Trisler was a farmer.

== Personal life and death ==
In 1864, Trisler married Mary M. Sargent, with whom he had six children.

Trisler resided in Whitewater Falls, Minnesota.

Trisler died at the age of 80 on February 26, 1921. He was buried at Whitewater Falls Cemetery.

Minnesota House of Representatives
Preceded by —	Member of the Minnesota House of Representatives from the 7th district 1873–1874	Succeeded by —
