= Troy, Minnesota =

Unincorporated community in Minnesota, United States

Troy
- Unincorporated community
- Location within Minnesota Location within the United States
- Coordinates: 43°52′15″N 92°04′05″W
- Country: United States
- State: Minnesota
- County: Winona County
- Township: Saratoga Township
- Elevation: 1,030 ft (310 m)
- Time zone: UTC-6 (Central (CST))
  - Summer (DST): UTC-5 (CDT)
- ZIP code: 55972
- Area code: 507
- GNIS feature ID: 654980

Troy is an unincorporated community in Saratoga Township, Winona County, Minnesota, United States.

== Geography ==
The small community is located near the junction of State Highway 74 and Winona County Road 6. Trout Run Creek flows through it. Nearby places include St. Charles, Saratoga, Clyde, and Chatfield.

== History ==
Troy had a post office from 1858 to 1905. The community was named after Troy, New York. The village was the initial home of Evergreen Masonic Lodge # 46. The lodge was chartered in 1864. It shared space with a local chapter of the Grange. In 1898 the lodge moved five miles to the east, to Clyde.
