= Benjamin Ellsworth House =

Historic house in Utica, Minnesota, United States

- U.S. National Register of Historic Places
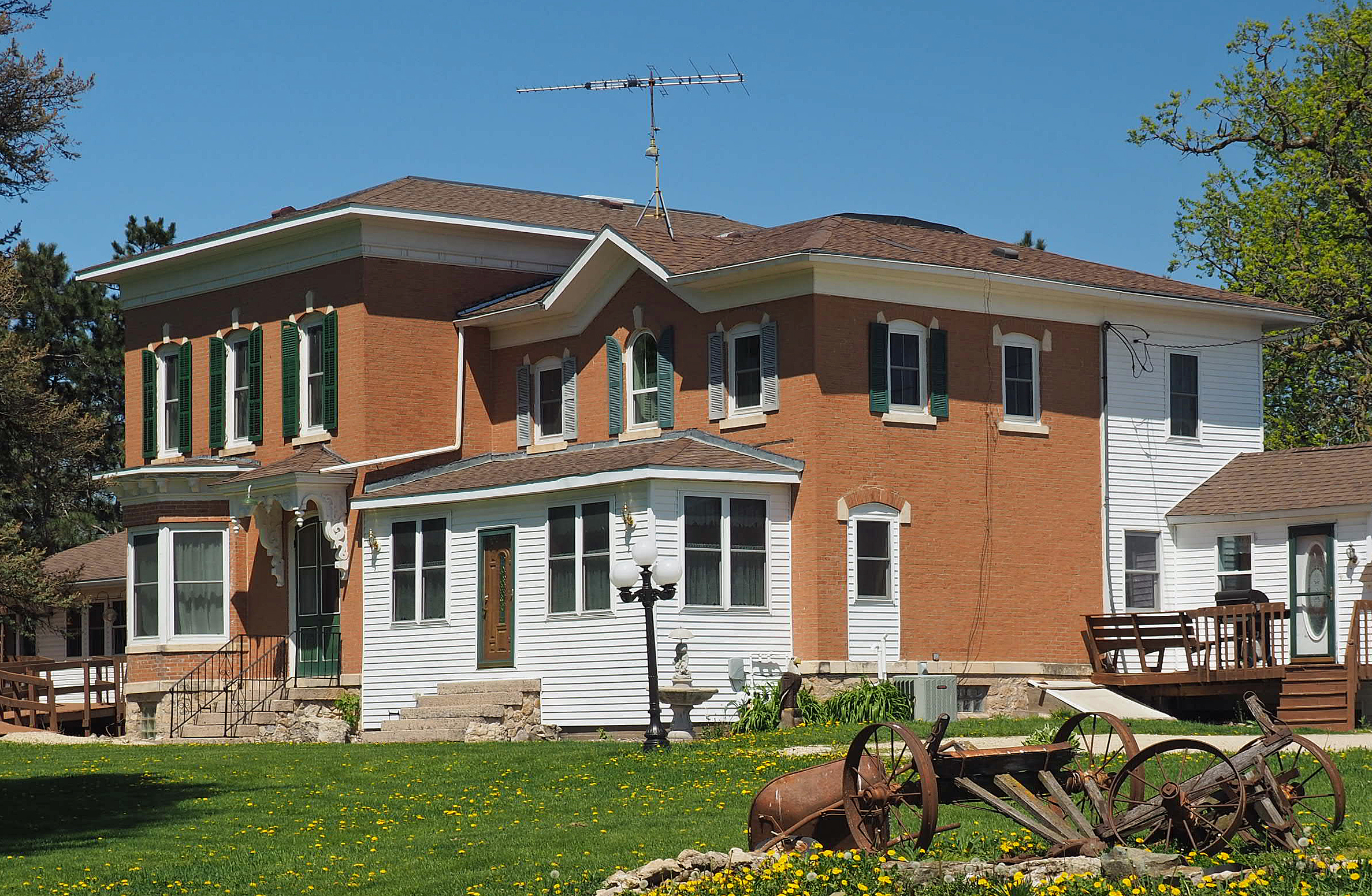
- The Benjamin Ellsworth House viewed from the southeast

- Location within Minnesota Location within the United States
- Location: 100 U.S. Route 14, Utica, Minnesota
- Coordinates: 43°58′43″N 91°57′23″W
- Area: 1 acre (0.40 ha)
- Built: 1873
- Architect: Benjamin Ellsworth
- Architectural style: Italianate
- NRHP reference No.: 84001718
- Designated: August 9, 1984

The Benjamin Ellsworth House is a historic house in Utica, Minnesota, United States. It was built in 1873 for Benjamin Ellsworth (1826–1890), the founder of Utica. The building was listed on the National Register of Historic Places in 1984 for its local significance in the themes of architecture and exploration/settlement. It was nominated for its associations with Ellsworth and for the degree of preservation of its original design.

== See also ==
- National Register of Historic Places listings in Winona County, Minnesota
