= Minnesota State Highway 248 =

State highway in Minnesota, United States

Trunk Highway 248
- MN 248 highlighted in red

Route information
- Maintained by MnDOT
- Length: 11.219 mi (18.055 km)
- Existed: July 1, 1949–present

Major junctions
- West end: CSAH 33 at Altura
- East end: US 61 near Minnesota City

Location
- Country: United States
- State: Minnesota
- Counties: Winona

Highway system
- Minnesota Trunk Highway System; Interstate; US; State; Legislative; Scenic
← MN 247	→ MN 249

Minnesota State Highway 248 (MN 248) is a 11.219-mile-long (18.055 km) highway in southeast Minnesota, which runs from its intersection with Winona County Road 33 in Altura east to its terminus at its intersection with U.S. Highway 61 just north of Minnesota City, near Winona.

== Route description ==
Highway 248 serves as an east–west route in southeast Minnesota between Altura, Rollingstone, and Minnesota City.

Highway 248 is also known as Main Street in Altura.

The route passes through the Richard J. Dorer State Forest.

The route is legally defined as Route 248 in the Minnesota Statutes.

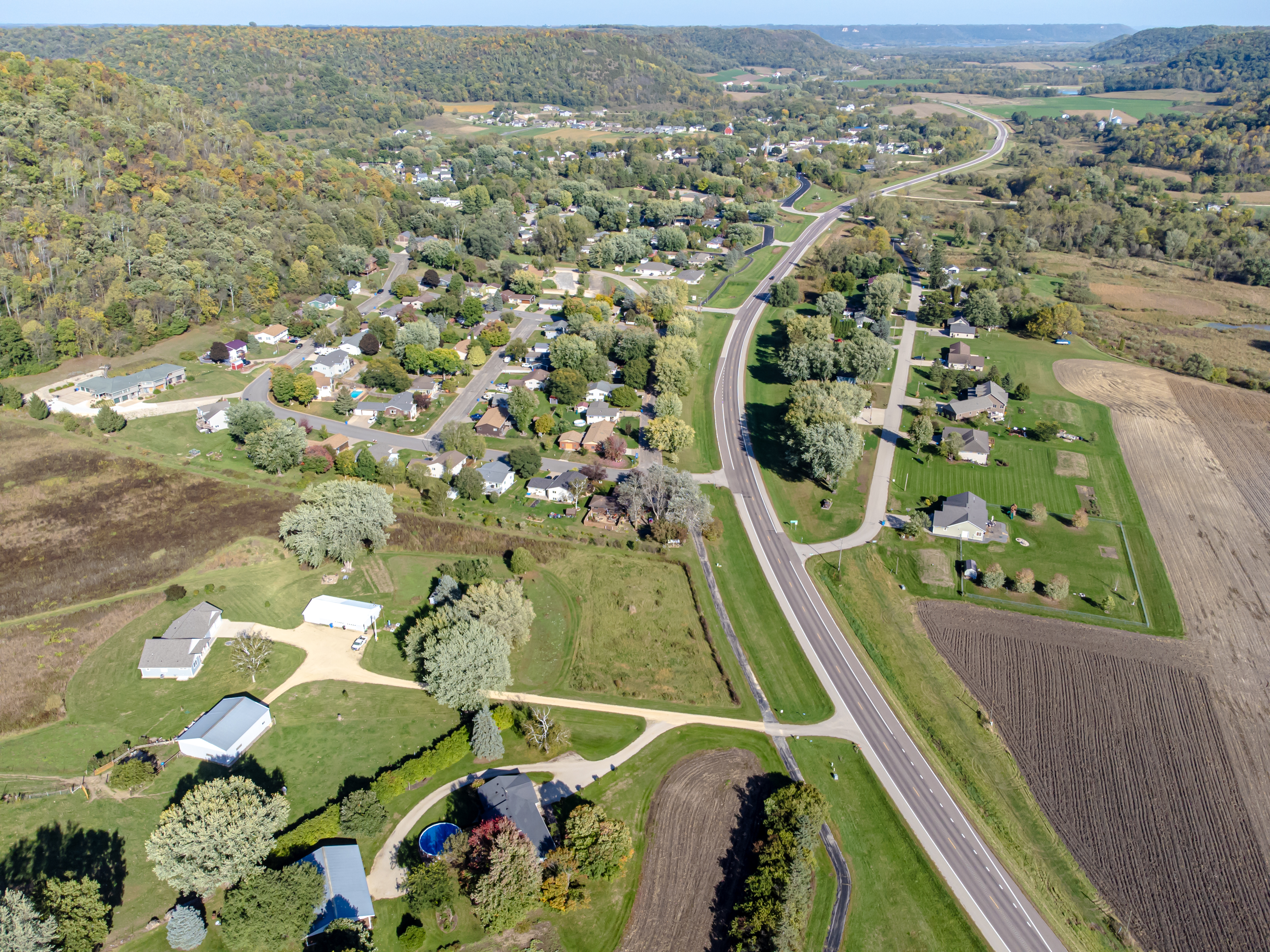
MN 248 through Rollingstone, Minnesota

== History ==
Highway 248 was authorized on July 1, 1949.

The route was paved when it was marked.

== Major intersections ==
The entire route is in Winona County.

Location	mi	km	Destinations	Notes
Altura	0.000	0.000	CSAH 33 (Main Street) – US 14	
Rollingstone Township	11.222	18.060	US 61 – Winona, Wabasha	
1.000 mi = 1.609 km; 1.000 km = 0.621 mi
