= Grover, Minnesota =

Ghost town in Winona County, Minnesota, US

Coordinates: 43.8688°N 91.9292°W

Grover is an abandoned townsite in section 29 of Fremont Township in Winona County, Minnesota, United States.

== History ==
Grover had a post office from 1886 until 1902.
