= Saratoga, Minnesota =

Unincorporated community in Minnesota, United States

Saratoga
- Unincorporated community
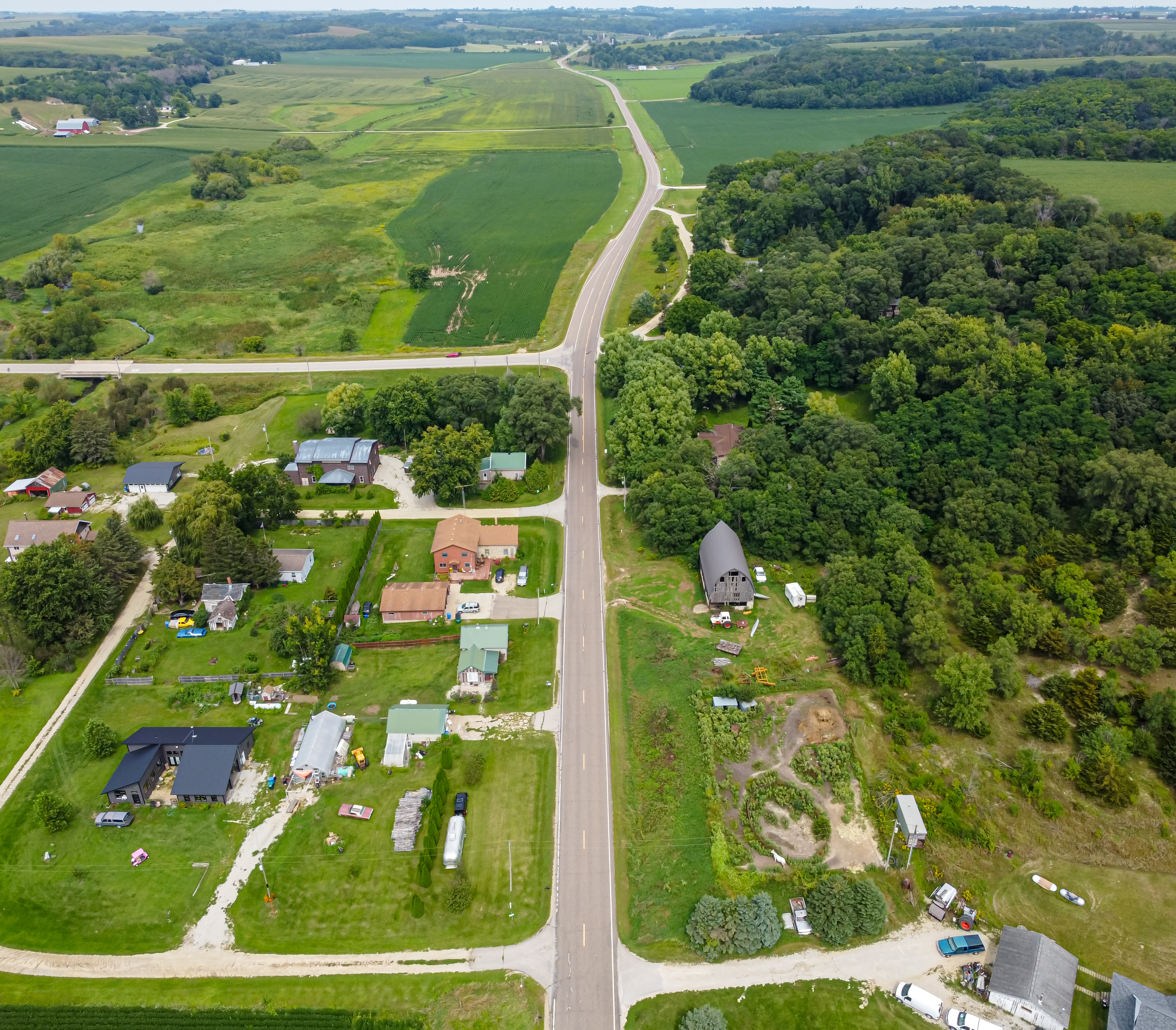

- Location within Minnesota Location within the United States
- Coordinates: 43°53′31″N 92°04′12″W
- Country: United States
- State: Minnesota
- County: Winona County
- Township: Saratoga Township
- Elevation: 1,073 ft (327 m)
- Time zone: UTC-6 (Central (CST))
  - Summer (DST): UTC-5 (CDT)
- ZIP code: 55972
- Area code: 507
- GNIS feature ID: 651213

Saratoga is an unincorporated community in Saratoga Township, Winona County, Minnesota, United States.

The community is located south of St. Charles; near the junction of State Highway 74 (MN 74) and Winona County Road 10.

Nearby places include St. Charles, Troy, Clyde, Dover, and Chatfield. Trout Run Creek flows through the community.
