= Mount Vernon Township, Winona County, Minnesota =

Mount Vernon Township, Minnesota
- Township
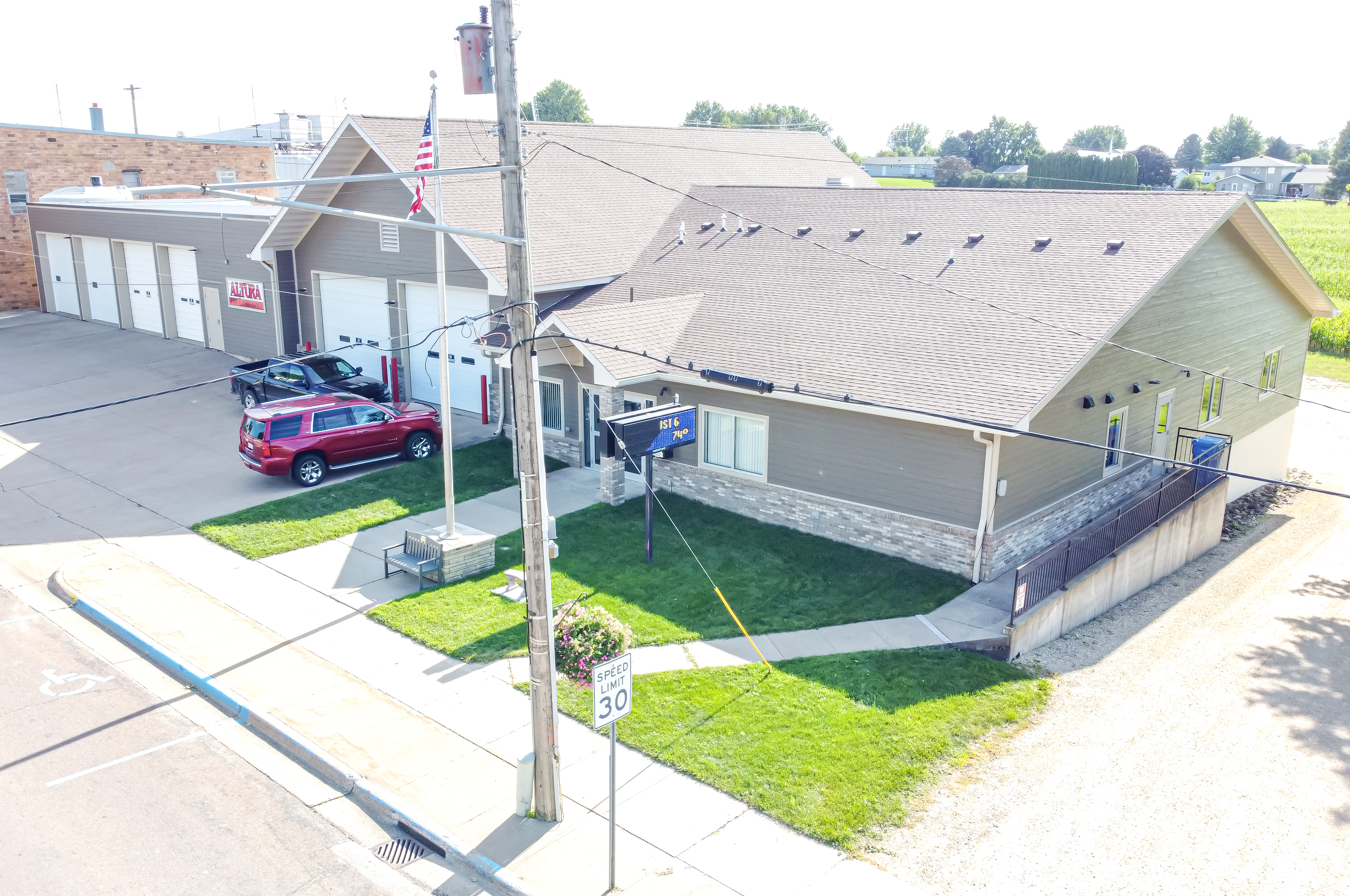
- Mount Vernon Township shares the Altura City Hall building in Altura

- Location within the state of Minnesota Mount Vernon Township, Minnesota (the United States)
- Coordinates: 44°9′26″N 91°53′55″W
- Country: United States
- State: Minnesota
- County: Winona

Area
  - Total: 35.4 sq mi (91.6 km^{2})
  - Land: 35.1 sq mi (91.0 km^{2})
  - Water: 0.23 sq mi (0.6 km^{2})
- Elevation: 1,204 ft (367 m)

Population (2010)
  - Total: 273
  - Density: 7.77/sq mi (3.00/km^{2})
- Time zone: UTC-6 (Central (CST))
  - Summer (DST): UTC-5 (CDT)
- FIPS code: 27-44656
- GNIS feature ID: 0665058

Mount Vernon Township is a township in Winona County, Minnesota, United States. The population was 273 at the 2010 census.

Mount Vernon Township was organized in 1858, and named after Mount Vernon, the Virginia estate of George Washington.

== Geography ==
According to the United States Census Bureau, the township has a total area of 35.4 square miles (92 km^{2}); 35.1 square miles (91 km^{2}) is land and 0.2 square miles (0.52 km^{2}), or 0.65%, is water.

== Demographics ==
As of the census of 2000, there were 297 people, 106 households, and 76 families residing in the township. The population density was 8.5 people per square mile (3.3/km^{2}). There were 111 housing units at an average density of 3.2/sq mi (1.2/km^{2}). The racial makeup of the township was 96.97% White, 0.34% African American, 0.34% Asian, 0.34% from other races, and 2.02% from two or more races. Hispanic or Latino of any race were 1.01% of the population.

There were 106 households, out of which 30.2% had children under the age of 18 living with them, 65.1% were married couples living together, 4.7% had a female householder with no husband present, and 27.4% were non-families. 17.0% of all households were made up of individuals, and 7.5% had someone living alone who was 65 years of age or older. The average household size was 2.80 and the average family size was 3.27.

In the township the population was spread out, with 24.6% under the age of 18, 9.8% from 18 to 24, 25.6% from 25 to 44, 27.3% from 45 to 64, and 12.8% who were 65 years of age or older. The median age was 39 years. For every 100 females, there were 112.1 males. For every 100 females age 18 and over, there were 117.5 males.

The median income for a household in the township was $45,781, and the median income for a family was $46,719. Males had a median income of $28,125 versus $22,083 for females. The per capita income for the township was $17,914. About 7.2% of families and 12.8% of the population were below the poverty line, including 20.5% of those under the age of eighteen and 6.3% of those 65 or over.
