= Hart Township, Winona County, Minnesota =

Hart Township, Minnesota
- Township
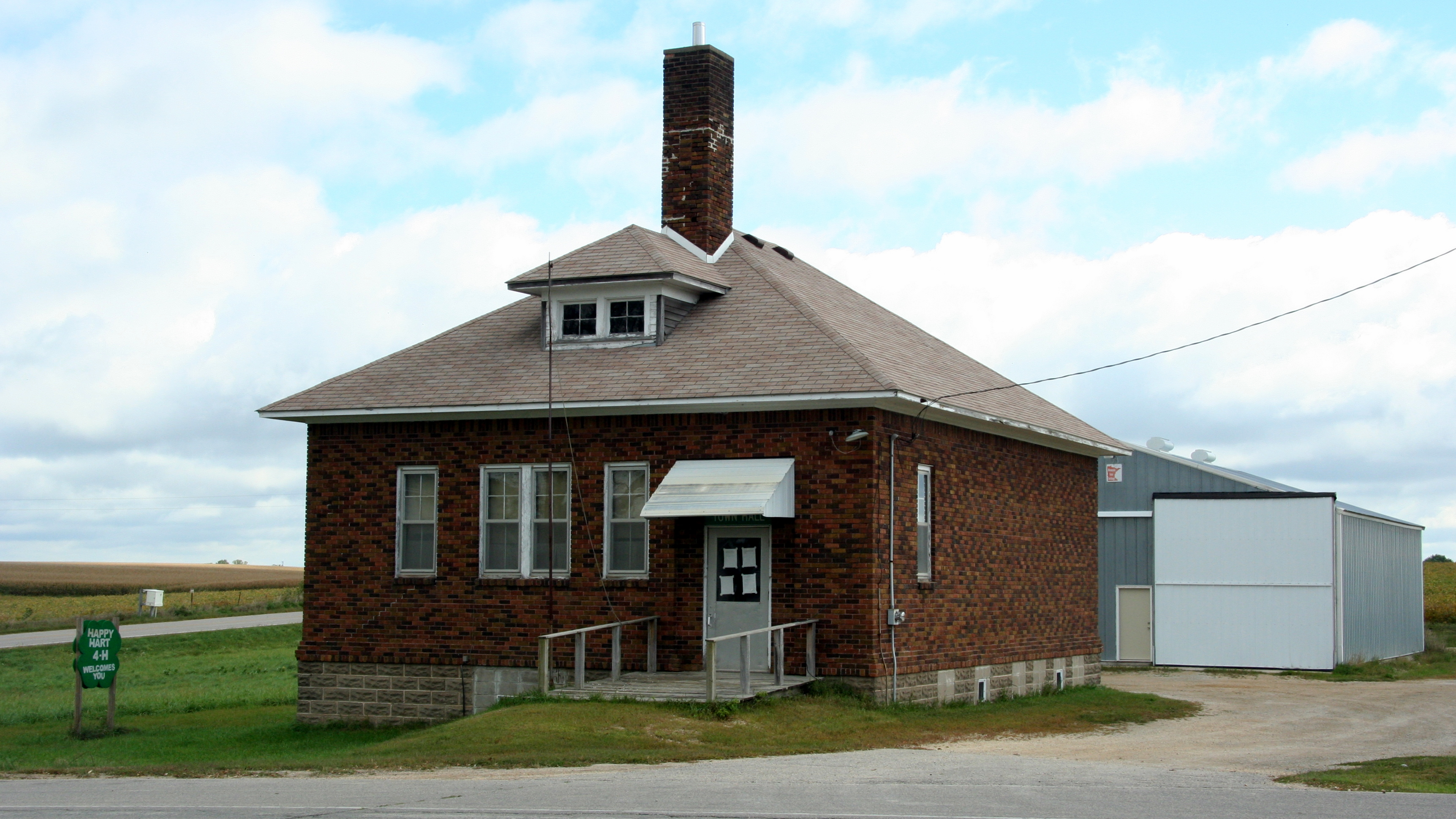

- Location within the state of Minnesota Hart Township, Minnesota (the United States)
- Coordinates: 43°53′32″N 91°47′19″W
- Country: United States
- State: Minnesota
- County: Winona

Area
  - Total: 35.6 sq mi (92.2 km^{2})
  - Land: 35.6 sq mi (92.2 km^{2})
  - Water: 0 sq mi (0.0 km^{2})
- Elevation: 1,152 ft (351 m)

Population (2010)
  - Total: 357
  - Density: 10.0/sq mi (3.87/km^{2})
- Time zone: UTC-6 (Central (CST))
  - Summer (DST): UTC-5 (CDT)
- FIPS code: 27-27350
- GNIS feature ID: 0664403

Hart Township is a township in Winona County, Minnesota, United States. The population was 357 at the 2010 census.

== History ==
Hart Township was organized in 1858.

== Geography ==
According to the United States Census Bureau, the township has a total area of 35.6 square miles (92 km^{2}), all land.

== Demographics ==
As of the census of 2000, there were 301 people, 109 households, and 89 families residing in the township. The population density was 8.5 inhabitants per square mile (3.3/km^{2}). There were 116 housing units at an average density of 3.3 per square mile (1.3/km^{2}). The racial makeup of the township was 99.34% White, 0.33% Native American, 0.33% from other races. Hispanic or Latino of any race were 1.00% of the population.

There were 109 households, out of which 39.4% had children under the age of 18 living with them, 75.2% were married couples living together, 2.8% had a female householder with no husband present, and 18.3% were non-families. 14.7% of all households were made up of individuals, and 9.2% had someone living alone who was 65 years of age or older. The average household size was 2.76 and the average family size was 3.11.

In the township the population was spread out, with 25.2% under the age of 18, 7.0% from 18 to 24, 28.9% from 25 to 44, 24.3% from 45 to 64, and 14.6% who were 65 years of age or older. The median age was 39 years. For every 100 females, there were 103.4 males. For every 100 females age 18 and over, there were 112.3 males.

The median income for a household in the township was $41,250, and the median income for a family was $47,625. Males had a median income of $29,583 versus $16,346 for females. The per capita income for the township was $17,258. About 2.4% of families and 4.7% of the population were below the poverty line, including 5.6% of those under the age of eighteen and 2.1% of those 65 or over.
