= Ashton, Minnesota =

Ghost town in Winona County, Minnesota, US

Coordinates: 43°55′N 91°30′W

Ashton is an abandoned townsite in sections 11 and 12 of Pleasant Hill Township in Winona County, Minnesota, United States.

== History ==
It was reportedly on or near present-day County Road 12 about 1.5 miles east-north-east of Ridgeway, Minnesota, but it is unclear whether any vestiges of the settlement survived highway construction in the area. A post office operated in Ashton between April 28, 1891, and November 29, 1902.
