= Whitewater Falls, Minnesota =

Ghost town in Winona County, US

Coordinates: 44°07′14″N 92°00′13″W

Whitewater Falls is an abandoned townsite in sections 27 and 34 of Whitewater Township in Winona County, Minnesota.

== History ==
Whitewater Falls had a post office from 1856 until 1899. The town took its name from the Whitewater River. Clark William Trisler (1840–1921), farmer and Minnesota state legislator, lived in Whitewater Falls with his wife and family.
