= Utica Township, Winona County, Minnesota =

Utica Township, Minnesota
- Township
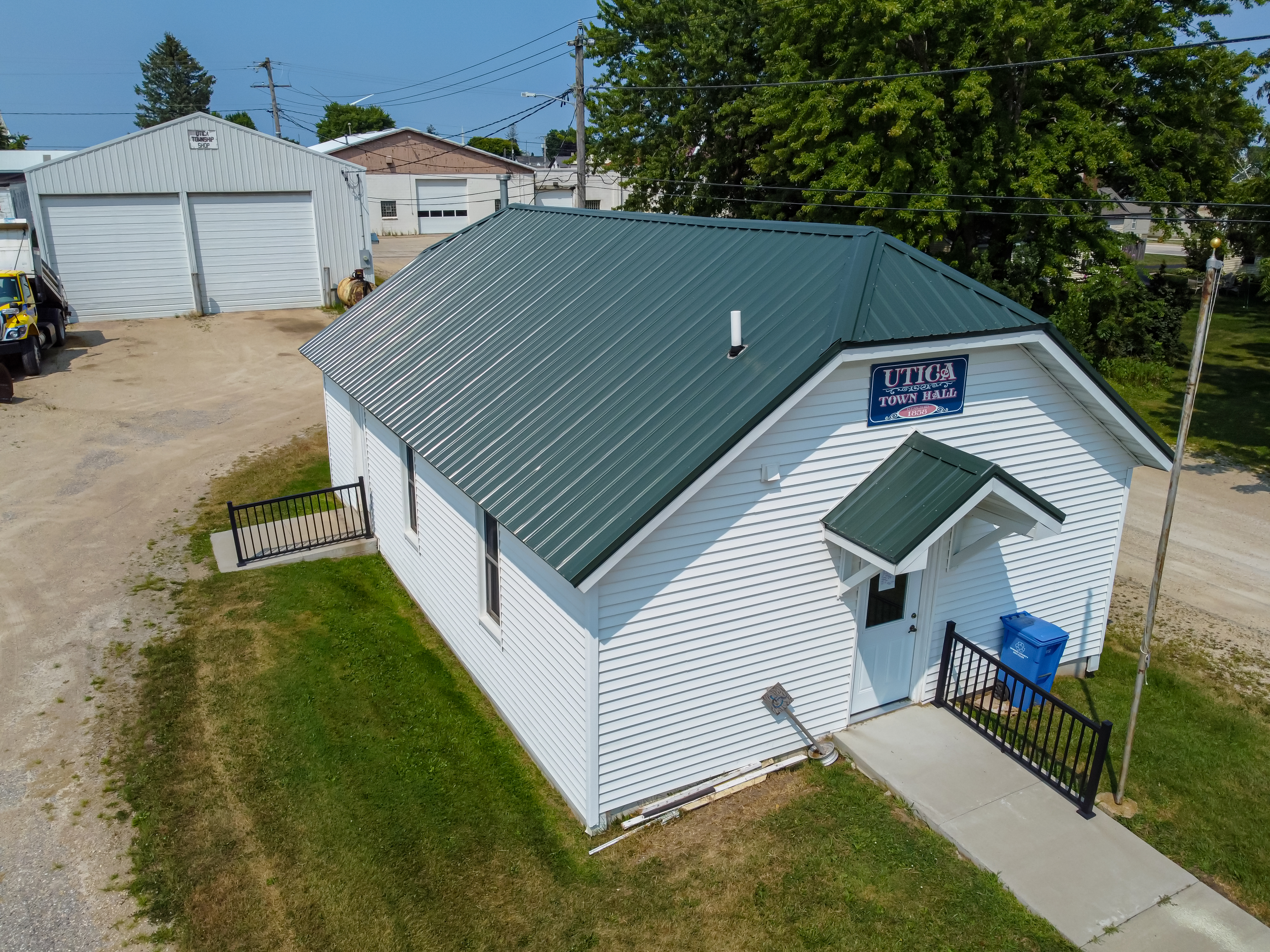
- Town hall in Lewiston

- Location within the state of Minnesota Utica Township, Minnesota (the United States)
- Coordinates: 43°58′51″N 91°53′36″W
- Country: United States
- State: Minnesota
- County: Winona

Area
  - Total: 33.9 sq mi (87.7 km^{2})
  - Land: 33.9 sq mi (87.7 km^{2})
  - Water: 0 sq mi (0.0 km^{2})
- Elevation: 1,188 ft (362 m)

Population (2010)
  - Total: 639
  - Density: 18.9/sq mi (7.29/km^{2})
- Time zone: UTC-6 (Central (CST))
  - Summer (DST): UTC-5 (CDT)
- ZIP code: 55979
- Area code: 507
- FIPS code: 27-66442
- GNIS feature ID: 0665846

Utica Township is a township in Winona County, Minnesota, United States. The population was 639 at the 2010 census.

Utica Township was organized in 1858, and named after Utica, New York.

== Geography ==
According to the United States Census Bureau, the township has a total area of 33.9 square miles (87.7 km^{2}), all land.

== Demographics ==
As of the census of 2000, there were 649 people, 201 households, and 174 families residing in the township. The population density was 19.2 people per square mile (7.4/km^{2}). There were 209 housing units at an average density of 6.2/sq mi (2.4/km^{2}). The racial makeup of the township was 99.38% White, 0.15% African American, and 0.46% from two or more races.

There were 201 households, out of which 42.3% had children under the age of 18 living with them, 78.1% were married couples living together, 3.5% had a female householder with no husband present, and 13.4% were non-families. 10.0% of all households were made up of individuals, and 2.0% had someone living alone who was 65 years of age or older. The average household size was 3.23 and the average family size was 3.49.

In the township the population was spread out, with 34.8% under the age of 18, 8.2% from 18 to 24, 25.7% from 25 to 44, 19.6% from 45 to 64, and 11.7% who were 65 years of age or older. The median age was 32 years. For every 100 females, there were 108.0 males. For every 100 females age 18 and over, there were 104.3 males.

The median income for a household in the township was $49,844, and the median income for a family was $51,071. Males had a median income of $31,023 versus $21,607 for females. The per capita income for the township was $17,576. About 5.6% of families and 8.4% of the population were below the poverty line, including 13.3% of those under age 18 and 6.0% of those age 65 or over.

== See also ==
- Utica, Minnesota - City of Utica is within boundaries of the Utica Township
