= Rollingstone Township, Winona County, Minnesota =

Rollingstone Township, Minnesota
- Township
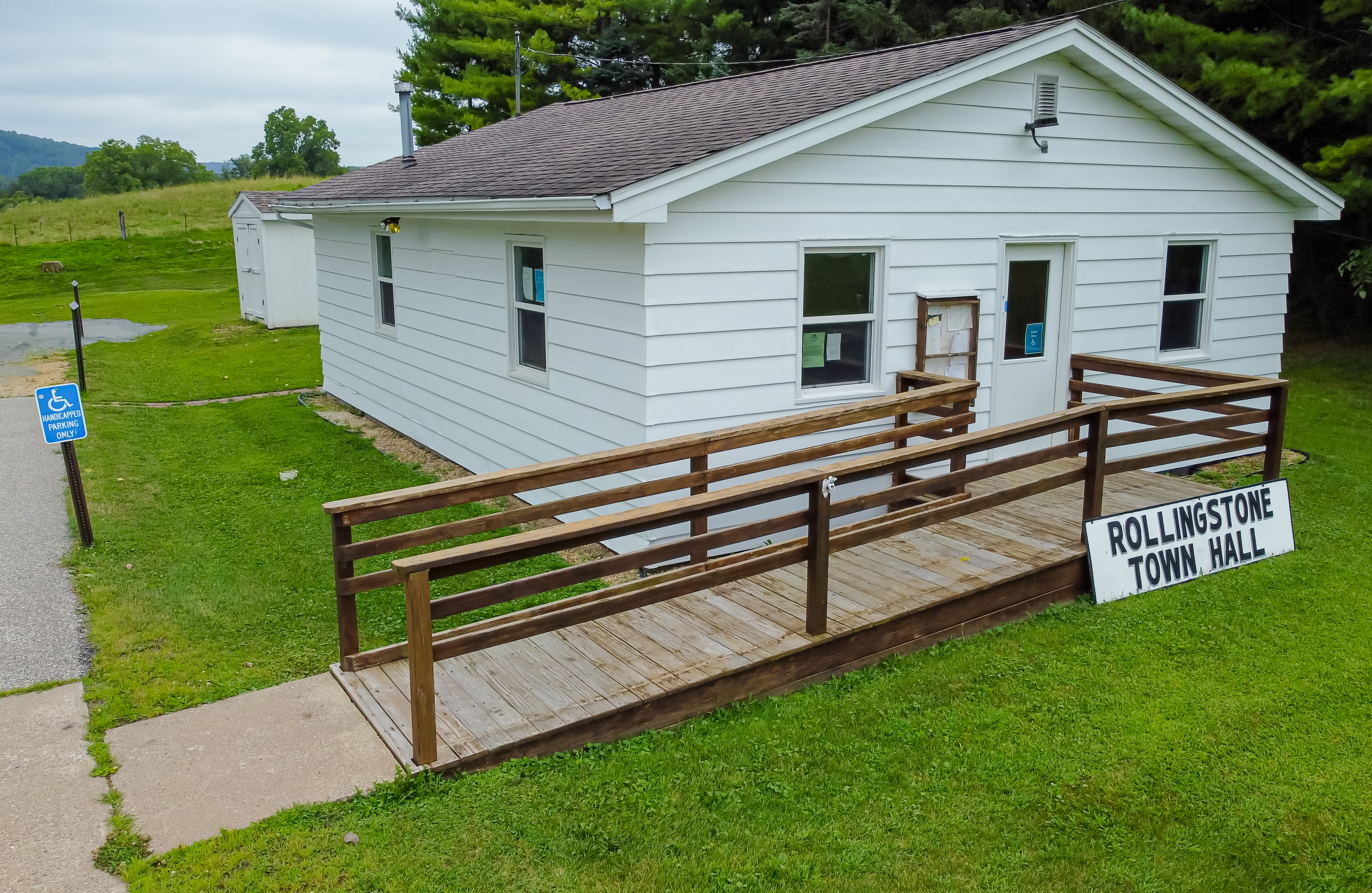
- Town hall at 24643 Highway 248 in Winona County

- Location within the state of Minnesota Rollingstone Township, Minnesota (the United States)
- Coordinates: 44°5′50″N 91°45′34″W
- Country: United States
- State: Minnesota
- County: Winona

Area
  - Total: 34.4 sq mi (89.1 km^{2})
  - Land: 30.3 sq mi (78.4 km^{2})
  - Water: 4.1 sq mi (10.7 km^{2})
- Elevation: 690 ft (210 m)

Population (2010)
  - Total: 701
  - Density: 23.2/sq mi (8.94/km^{2})
- Time zone: UTC-6 (Central (CST))
  - Summer (DST): UTC-5 (CDT)
- ZIP code: 55969
- Area code: 507
- FIPS code: 27-55294
- GNIS feature ID: 0665449

Rollingstone Township is a township in Winona County, Minnesota, United States. The population was 701 at the 2010 census.

== History ==
The area now known as Rollingstone Township, saw the first permanent settlement by European immigrants, a group of Luxembourgers, in 1852. A few years later, on March 6, 1855, the Township was officially organized by an act of the Minnesota Territorial Legislature.

Rollingstone Township took its name from Rollingstone Creek.

== Geography ==
According to the United States Census Bureau, the township has a total area of 34.4 square miles (89 km^{2}); 30.3 square miles (78 km^{2}) is land and 4.1 square miles (11 km^{2}), or 12.03%, is water.

== Demographics ==
As of the census of 2000, there were 1,087 people, 434 households, and 336 families residing in the township. The population density was 35.9 inhabitants per square mile (13.9/km^{2}). There were 461 housing units at an average density of 15.2/sq mi (5.9/km^{2}). The racial makeup of the township was 97.70% White, 0.64% African American, 0.09% Native American, 0.92% Asian, and 0.64% from two or more races. Hispanic or Latino of any race were 0.55% of the population.

There were 434 households, out of which 28.8% had children under the age of 18 living with them, 71.2% were married couples living together, 3.9% had a female householder with no husband present, and 22.4% were non-families. 20.3% of all households were made up of individuals, and 6.2% had someone living alone who was 65 years of age or older. The average household size was 2.50 and the average family size was 2.88.

In the township the population was spread out, with 21.8% under the age of 18, 6.3% from 18 to 24, 24.7% from 25 to 44, 33.1% from 45 to 64, and 14.1% who were 65 years of age or older. The median age was 43 years. For every 100 females, there were 104.3 males. For every 100 females age 18 and over, there were 107.8 males.

The median income for a household in the township was $54,250, and the median income for a family was $60,909. Males had a median income of $38,403 versus $25,000 for females. The per capita income for the township was $22,310. About 2.0% of families and 2.5% of the population were below the poverty line, including 0.8% of those under age 18 and 4.2% of those age 65 or over.
