= Fremont Township, Winona County, Minnesota =

Fremont Township, Minnesota
- Township
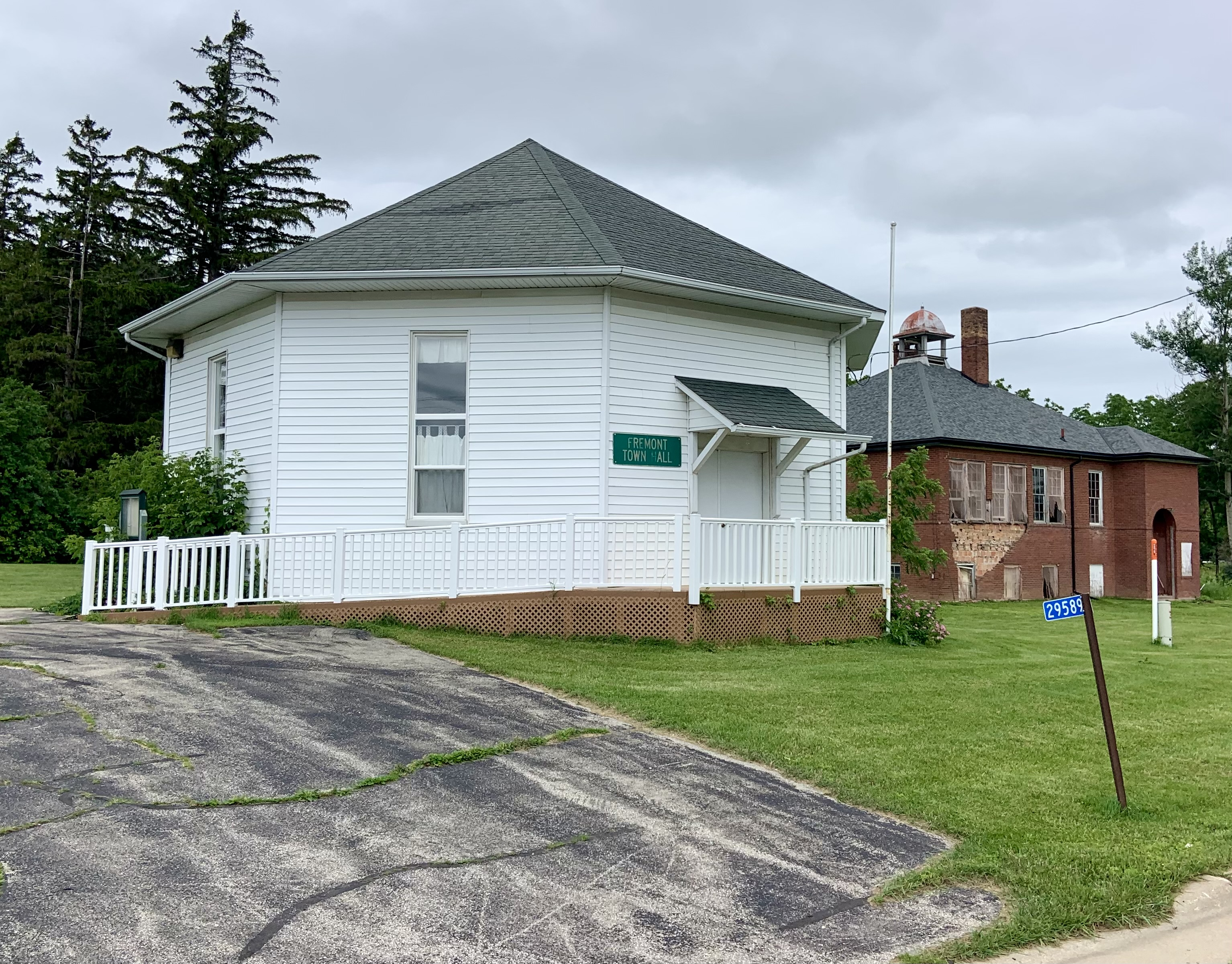
- Fremont Town Hall in Fremont

- Location within the state of Minnesota Fremont Township, Minnesota (the United States)
- Coordinates: 43°54′24″N 91°54′47″W
- Country: United States
- State: Minnesota
- County: Winona

Area
  - Total: 35.9 sq mi (93.0 km^{2})
  - Land: 35.9 sq mi (93.0 km^{2})
  - Water: 0 sq mi (0.0 km^{2})
- Elevation: 1,178 ft (359 m)

Population (2010)
  - Total: 355
  - Density: 9.89/sq mi (3.82/km^{2})
- Time zone: UTC-6 (Central (CST))
  - Summer (DST): UTC-5 (CDT)
- ZIP code: 55979
- Area code: 507
- FIPS code: 27-22688
- GNIS feature ID: 0664229

Fremont Township is a township in Winona County, Minnesota, United States. The population was 355 at the 2010 census.

== History ==
Fremont Township was organized in 1858, and named for John C. Frémont (1813–1890), an American explorer.

== Geography ==
According to the United States Census Bureau, the township has a total area of 35.9 square miles (93 km^{2}), all land.

== Demographics ==
As of the census of 2000, there were 360 people, 124 households, and 97 families residing in the township. The population density was 10.0 inhabitants per square mile (3.9/km^{2}). There were 139 housing units at an average density of 3.9 per square mile (1.5/km^{2}). The racial makeup of the township was 98.61% White, 0.28% Native American, 0.28% Asian, and 0.83% from two or more races.

There were 124 households, out of which 41.9% had children under the age of 18 living with them, 71.8% were married couples living together, 2.4% had a female householder with no husband present, and 21.0% were non-families. 18.5% of all households were made up of individuals, and 10.5% had someone living alone who was 65 years of age or older. The average household size was 2.90 and the average family size was 3.36.

In the township the population was spread out, with 30.8% under the age of 18, 6.9% from 18 to 24, 25.3% from 25 to 44, 22.5% from 45 to 64, and 14.4% who were 65 years of age or older. The median age was 38 years. For every 100 females, there were 108.1 males. For every 100 females age 18 and over, there were 109.2 males.

The median income for a household in the township was $44,583, and the median income for a family was $48,281. Males had a median income of $27,500 versus $24,375 for females. The per capita income for the township was $17,365. About 6.8% of families and 7.4% of the population were below the poverty line, including 7.1% of those under age 18 and 20.4% of those age 65 or over.
