= Minnesota City, Minnesota =

City in Minnesota, United States

- City
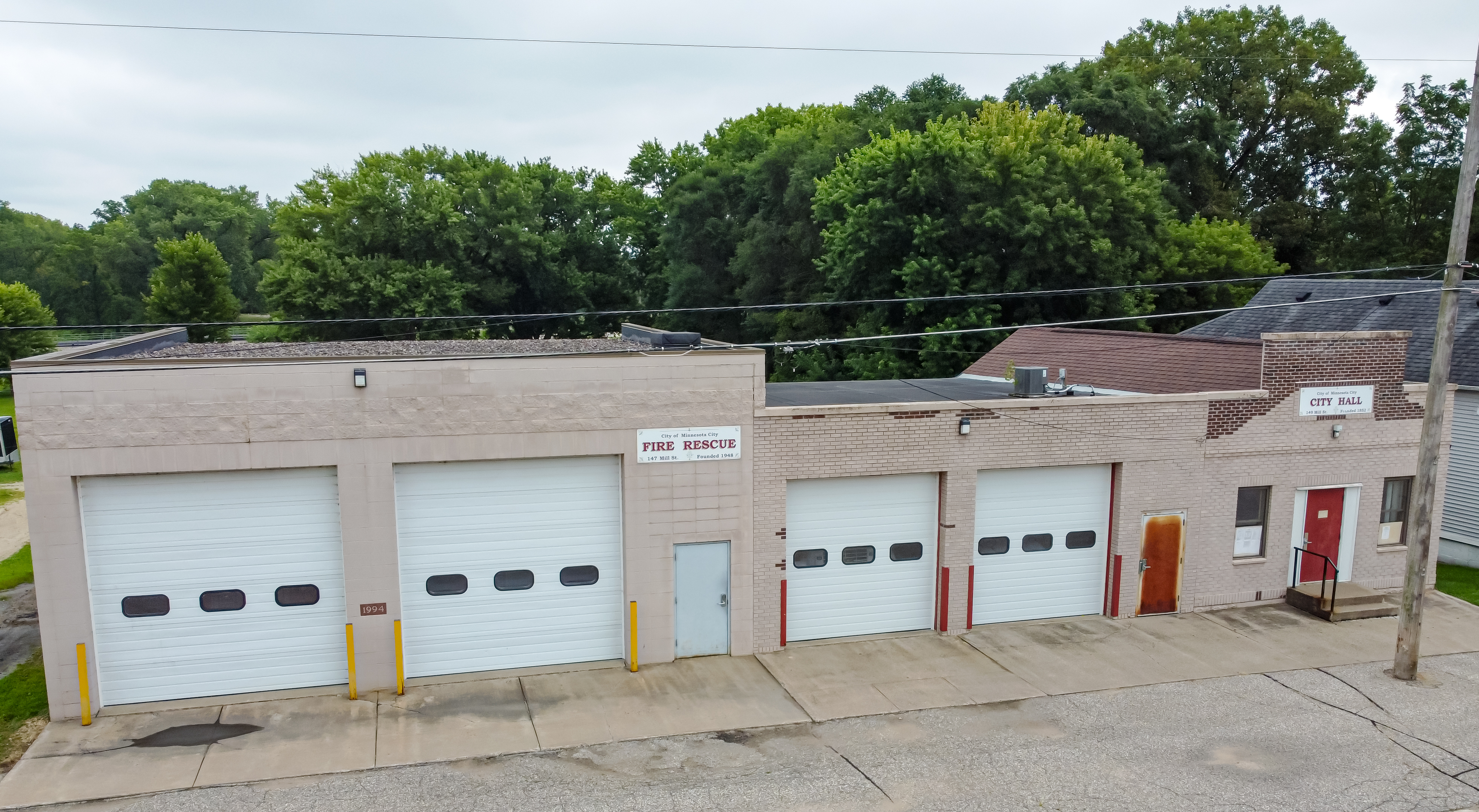
- City hall
- Motto: "A Past That We Honor A Present That We Give Meaning A Future That We Build Together"
- Location of Minnesota City, Minnesota
- Coordinates: 44°05′32″N 91°45′00″W
- Country: United States
- State: Minnesota
- County: Winona
- Platted: March 1852
- Incorporated: April 12, 1895

Government
  - Mayor: Donald J. O'Neil

Area
  - Total: 0.249 sq mi (0.644 km^{2})
  - Land: 0.249 sq mi (0.644 km^{2})
  - Water: 0 sq mi (0.000 km^{2})
- Elevation: 686 ft (209 m)

Population (2020)
  - Total: 202
  - Estimate (2022): 189
  - Density: 812.1/sq mi (313.54/km^{2})
- Time zone: UTC–6 (Central (CST))
  - Summer (DST): UTC–5 (CDT)
- ZIP Code: 55959
- Area code: 507
- FIPS code: 27-43144
- GNIS feature ID: 664992
- Sales tax: 7.375%
- Website: minnesotacitymn.gov

Minnesota City is a city in Winona County, Minnesota, United States. The population was 202 at the 2020 census.

== History ==
Minnesota City was platted in March 1852. The city took its name from the Minnesota Territory. A post office has been in operation in Minnesota City since 1852. The city was founded with hopes that it would be a useful port for steamboats. These hopes were dashed when it was discovered that the city was not built in the main channel of the Mississippi River, but rather on the Straight Slough, which was too shallow and sandy to be navigable for ships of that size. The city continued to prosper without river traffic, establishing the first public school, church, sawmill, and wheat farm in Winona county. The city was incorporated in 1896. The city was initially log cabins, and weathered winters well due to an abundance of firewood. Despite no issues with food or cold, disease took a toll on the first settlers, specifically cholera and typhus. The city hall had building materials purchased, but was not built due to illness among the would-be workers. The city enjoyed an economic boom following the end of the Civil War in 1865.

== Geography ==
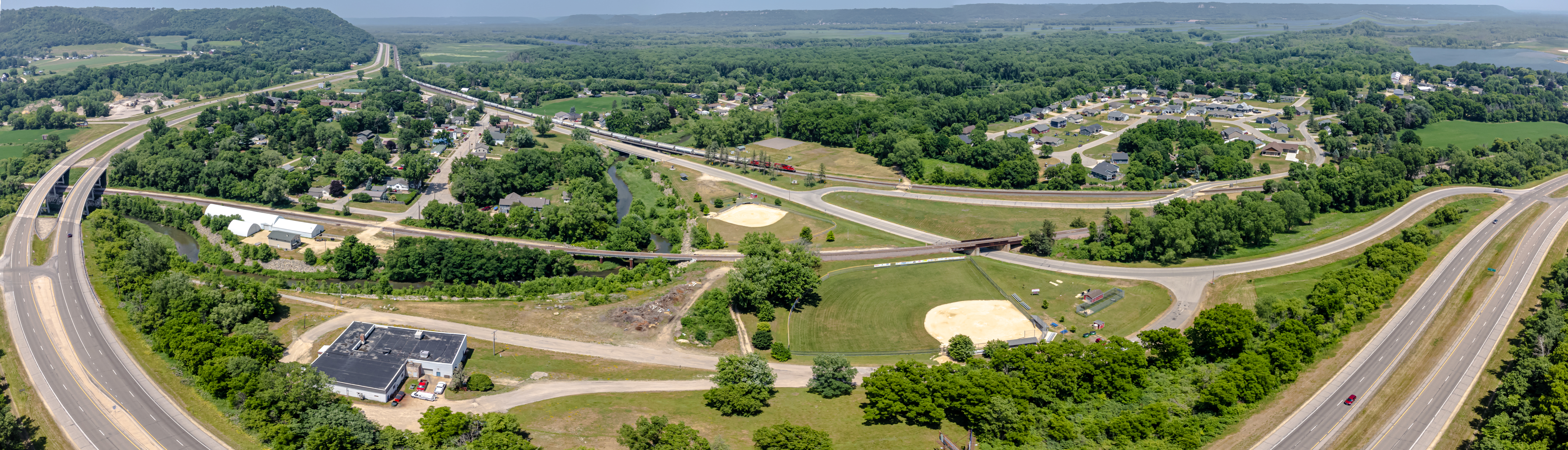
Minnesota City, Minnesota

According to the United States Census Bureau, the city has a total area of 0.248 square miles (0.64 km^{2}), all land.

== Demographics ==
Historical population
Census	Pop.	Note	%±
1880	273		—
1900	242		—
1910	211		−12.8%
1920	141		−33.2%
1930	151		7.1%
1940	211		39.7%
1950	201		−4.7%
1960	190		−5.5%
1970	301		58.4%
1980	265		−12.0%
1990	258		−2.6%
2000	235		−8.9%
2010	204		−13.2%
2020	202		−1.0%
2022 (est.)	189		−6.4%
U.S. Decennial Census; 2020 Census

=== 2010 census ===
As of the 2010 census, there were 204 people, 81 households, and 60 families living in the city. The population density was 784.6 inhabitants per square mile (302.9/km^{2}). There were 89 housing units at an average density of 342.3 per square mile (132.2/km^{2}). The racial makeup of the city was 99.5% White and 0.5% Native American. Hispanic or Latino of any race were 0.5% of the population.

There were 81 households, of which 39.5% had children under the age of 18 living with them, 54.3% were married couples living together, 9.9% had a female householder with no husband present, 9.9% had a male householder with no wife present, and 25.9% were non-families. 16.0% of all households were made up of individuals, and 2.4% had someone living alone who was 65 years of age or older. The average household size was 2.52 and the average family size was 2.77.

The median age in the city was 36 years. 25.5% of residents were under the age of 18; 6.8% were between the ages of 18 and 24; 29% were from 25 to 44; 26.4% were from 45 to 64; and 12.3% were 65 years of age or older. The gender makeup of the city was 52.9% male and 47.1% female.

=== 2000 census ===
As of the 2000 census, there were 235 people, 84 households, and 64 families living in the city. The population density was 912.0 inhabitants per square mile (352.1/km^{2}). There were 85 housing units at an average density of 329.9 per square mile (127.4/km^{2}). The racial makeup of the city was 99.57% White, 0.43% from other races. Hispanic or Latino of any race were 0.43% of the population.

There were 84 households, out of which 34.5% had children under the age of 18 living with them, 65.5% were married couples living together, 7.1% had a female householder with no husband present, and 23.8% were non-families. 16.7% of all households were made up of individuals, and 4.8% had someone living alone who was 65 years of age or older. The average household size was 2.80 and the average family size was 3.05.

In the city, the population was spread out, with 27.7% under the age of 18, 7.7% from 18 to 24, 29.8% from 25 to 44, 25.1% from 45 to 64, and 9.8% who were 65 years of age or older. The median age was 35 years. For every 100 females, there were 113.6 males. For every 100 females age 18 and over, there were 104.8 males.

The median income for a household in the city was $46,458, and the median income for a family was $47,708. Males had a median income of $30,000 versus $22,500 for females. The per capita income for the city was $18,430. None of the families and 2.5% of the population were living below the poverty line, including no under eighteens and 10.0% of those over 64.

== Transportation ==
Amtrak’s Empire Builder, which operates between Seattle/Portland and Chicago, passes through the town on CP tracks, but makes no stop. The nearest station is located in Winona, 6 miles (9.7 km) to the southeast.
