= Winona County, Minnesota =

County in Minnesota, United States

- County
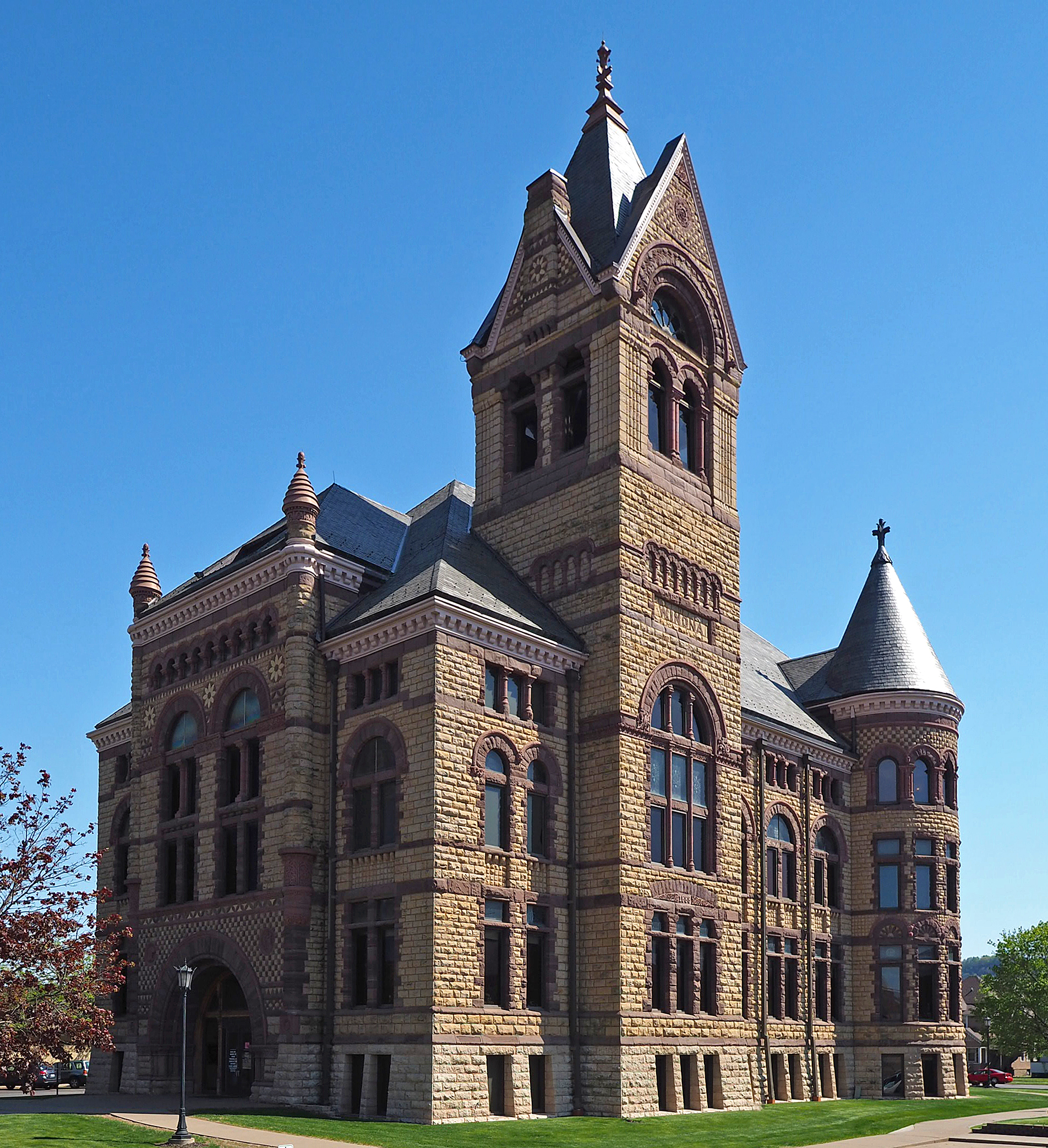
- Winona County Courthouse

- Location within the U.S. state of Minnesota
- Coordinates: 43°59′N 91°46′W
- Country: United States
- State: Minnesota
- Founded: February 23, 1854
- Named for: Winona (Native American)
- Seat: Winona
- Largest city: Winona

Area
  - Total: 642 sq mi (1,660 km^{2})
  - Land: 626 sq mi (1,620 km^{2})
  - Water: 15 sq mi (39 km^{2}) 2.4%

Population (2020)
  - Total: 49,671
  - Estimate (2025): 50,523 ▲
  - Density: 79.3/sq mi (30.6/km^{2})
- Time zone: UTC−6 (Central)
  - Summer (DST): UTC−5 (CDT)
- Congressional district: 1st
- Website: www.winonacounty.gov

Winona County is a county in the U.S. state of Minnesota. As of the 2020 census, its population was 49,671. Its county seat is Winona. Winona County comprises the Winona Micropolitan Statistical Area.

== History ==
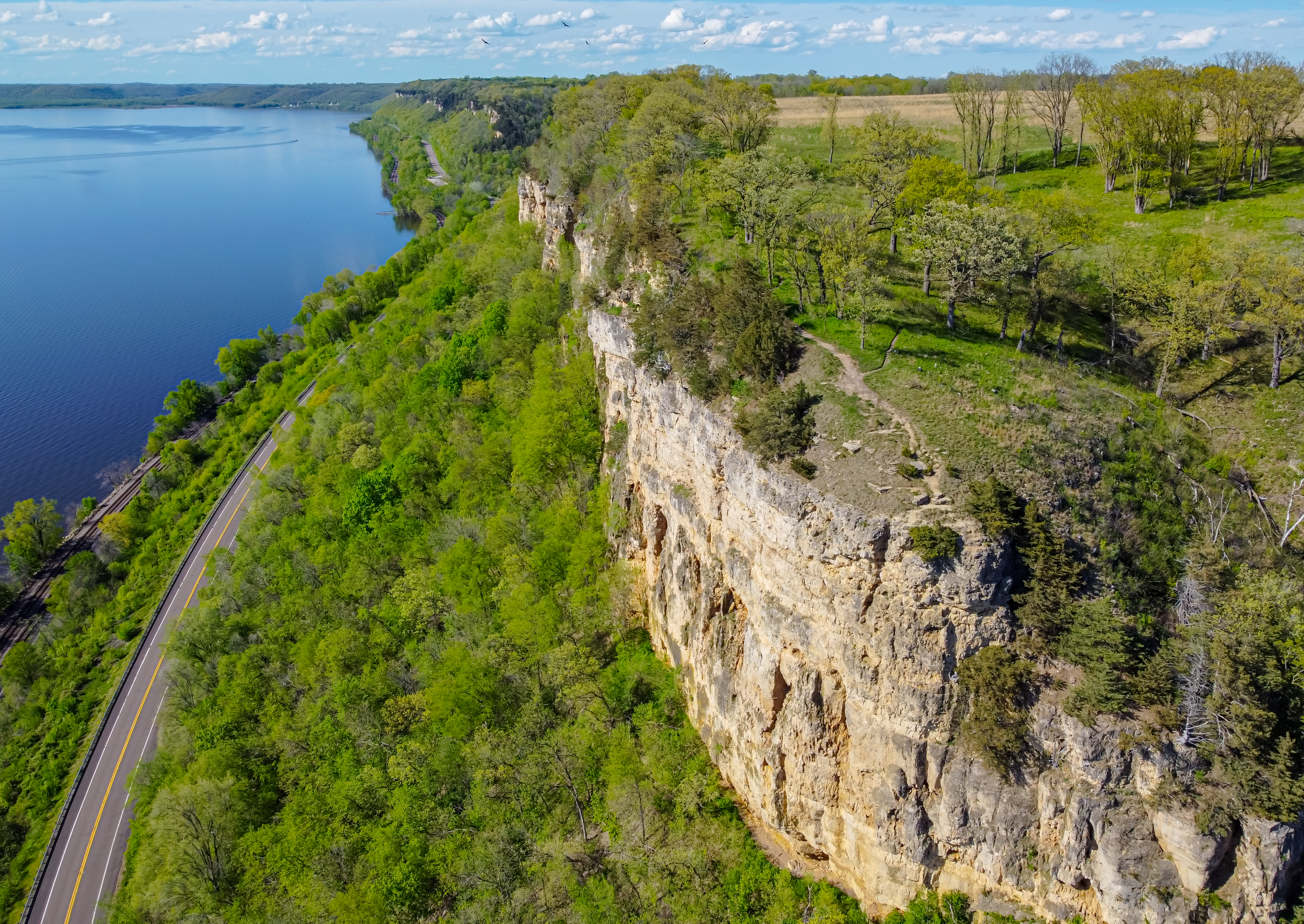
Maiden's Rock, from which legend has it the Dakota maiden named Winona leapt to her death

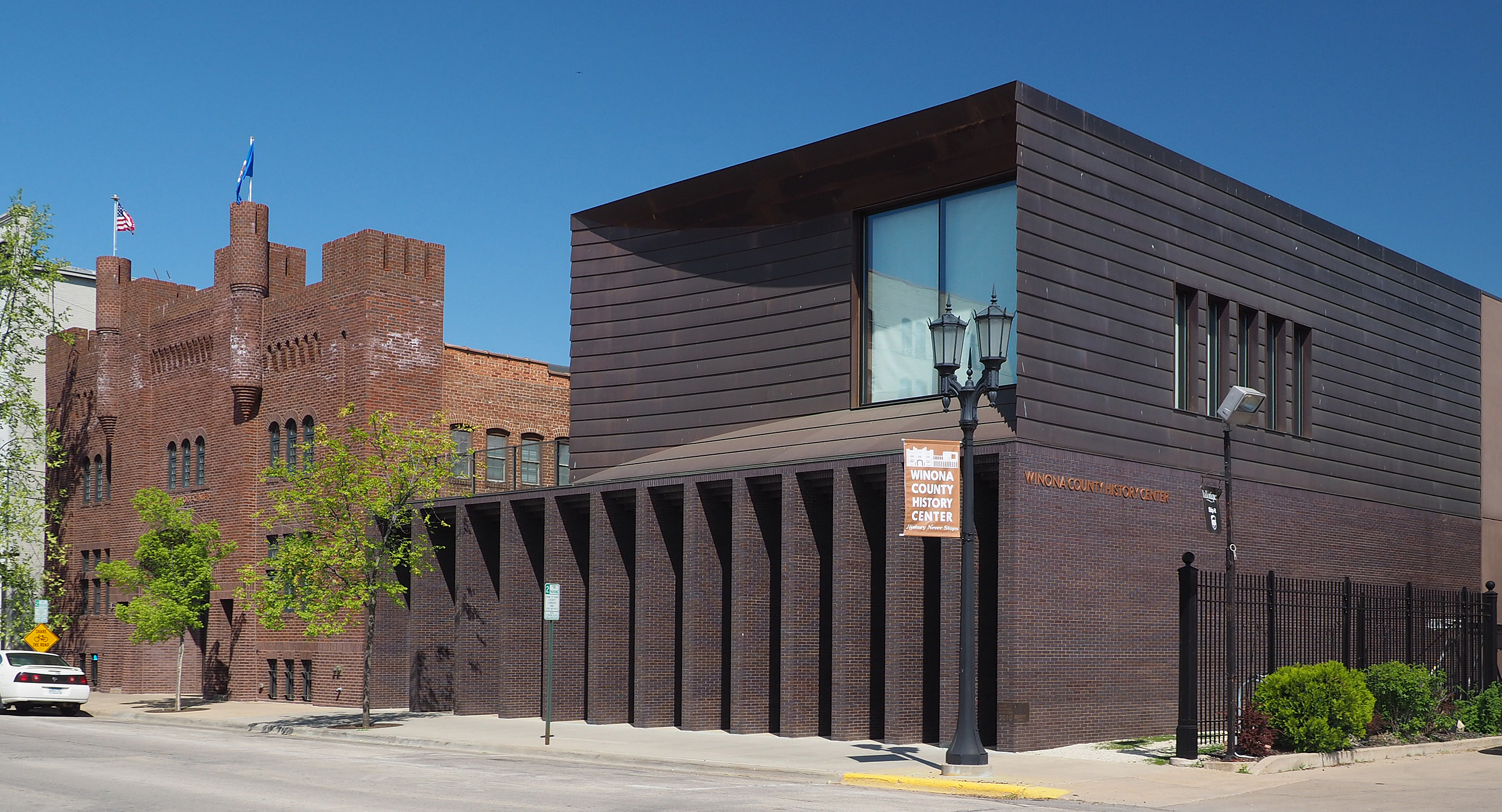
Winona County History Center

The Wisconsin Territory was established by the federal government effective July 3, 1836, and existed until its eastern portion was granted statehood (as Wisconsin) in 1848. The federal government set up the Minnesota Territory effective March 3, 1849. The newly organized territorial legislature created nine counties across the territory in October of that year. One of those counties, Wabasha, had its southern section partitioned off on March 5, 1853, into a new county, Fillmore. On February 23, 1854, the legislature partitioned the northern part of Fillmore County, plus a small section of Wabasha, to create Winona County, with the village of Winona as county seat. The county name was taken from the village name, which is said to derive from a Dakota legend about a woman, Winona (a relative of Chief Wabasha), who was betrothed to a warrior she did not love. Rather than marry him, she jumped to her death from a rock on Lake Pepin now called "Maiden's Rock". This is known as the Winona legend.

The county boundaries have not changed since 1854.

== Geography ==
Soils of Winona County

Winona County lies on Minnesota's border with Wisconsin and is part of the driftless area that defines southeastern Minnesota, northeastern Iowa, southwestern Wisconsin and northwestern Illinois. The Mississippi, flowing south-southeast, defines the county's eastern border. The U.S. Army Corps of Engineers (St. Paul District) maintains the region's lock-and-dam system.

The terrain slopes to the south and east, with its highest point at 1,365 ft (416 m) ASL on a hill two miles (3.2 km) east of Wilson. The county has an area of 642 square miles (1,660 km^{2}), of which 626 square miles (1,620 km^{2}) is land and 15 square miles (39 km^{2}) (2.4%) is water.

Winona County borders Wabasha County, Olmsted County, Fillmore County and Houston County.

=== Transit ===
- Winona Transit Service
- Jefferson Lines
- Amtrak (Empire Builder)

=== Major highways ===
- Interstate 90
- U.S. Highway 14
- U.S. Highway 61
- Minnesota State Highway 43
- Minnesota State Highway 74
- Minnesota State Highway 76
- Minnesota State Highway 248

=== Public airports ===
- Winona Municipal Airport (ONA) (Max Conrad Field), NW of Winona

=== Adjacent counties ===
- Wabasha County - northwest
- Buffalo County, Wisconsin - north
- Trempealeau County, Wisconsin - northeast
- La Crosse County, Wisconsin - east
- Houston County - south
- Fillmore County - southwest
- Olmsted County - west

== Demographics ==
Historical population
Census	Pop.	Note	%±
1860	9,208		—
1870	22,319		142.4%
1880	27,107		21.5%
1890	33,797		24.7%
1900	35,686		5.6%
1910	33,398		−6.4%
1920	33,653		0.8%
1930	35,144		4.4%
1940	37,795		7.5%
1950	39,841		5.4%
1960	40,937		2.8%
1970	44,409		8.5%
1980	46,256		4.2%
1990	47,828		3.4%
2000	49,985		4.5%
2010	51,461		3.0%
2020	49,671		−3.5%
2025 (est.)	50,523	▲	1.7%
U.S. Decennial Census; 1790-1960 1900-1990; 1990-2000 2010-2020

=== Racial and ethnic composition ===
Winona County, Minnesota – Racial and ethnic composition Note: the US Census treats Hispanic/Latino as an ethnic category. This table excludes Latinos from the racial categories and assigns them to a separate category. Hispanics/Latinos may be of any race.
Race / Ethnicity (NH = Non-Hispanic)	Pop 1980	Pop 1990	Pop 2000	Pop 2010	Pop 2020	% 1980	% 1990	% 2000	% 2010	% 2020
White alone (NH)	45,626	46,655	47,522	47,828	44,178	98.64%	97.55%	95.07%	92.94%	88.94%
Black or African American alone (NH)	105	183	384	642	892	0.23%	0.38%	0.77%	1.25%	1.80%
Native American or Alaska Native alone (NH)	73	111	83	116	84	0.16%	0.23%	0.17%	0.23%	0.17%
Asian alone (NH)	163	524	931	1,097	933	0.35%	1.10%	1.86%	2.13%	1.88%
Native Hawaiian or Pacific Islander alone (NH)	x	x	9	2	0	x	x	0.02%	0.00%	0.00%
Other race alone (NH)	93	5	27	27	124	0.20%	0.01%	0.05%	0.05%	0.25%
Mixed race or Multiracial (NH)	x	x	343	505	1,571	x	x	0.69%	0.98%	3.16%
Hispanic or Latino (any race)	196	350	686	1,244	1,889	0.42%	0.73%	1.37%	2.42%	3.80%
Total	46,256	47,828	49,985	51,461	49,671	100.00%	100.00%	100.00%	100.00%	100.00%

=== 2020 census ===
As of the 2020 census, the county had a population of 49,671. The median age was 37.2 years. 18.7% of residents were under the age of 18 and 18.6% of residents were 65 years of age or older. For every 100 females there were 95.8 males, and for every 100 females age 18 and over there were 93.8 males age 18 and over.

The racial makeup of the county was 89.9% White, 1.8% Black or African American, 0.2% American Indian and Alaska Native, 1.9% Asian, <0.1% Native Hawaiian and Pacific Islander, 1.8% from some other race, and 4.3% from two or more races. Hispanic or Latino residents of any race comprised 3.8% of the population.

59.7% of residents lived in urban areas, while 40.3% lived in rural areas.

There were 20,111 households in the county, of which 23.7% had children under the age of 18 living in them. Of all households, 45.4% were married-couple households, 21.2% were households with a male householder and no spouse or partner present, and 25.5% were households with a female householder and no spouse or partner present. About 31.9% of all households were made up of individuals and 12.9% had someone living alone who was 65 years of age or older.

There were 21,716 housing units, of which 7.4% were vacant. Among occupied housing units, 68.1% were owner-occupied and 31.9% were renter-occupied. The homeowner vacancy rate was 1.0% and the rental vacancy rate was 8.0%.

=== 2000 census ===
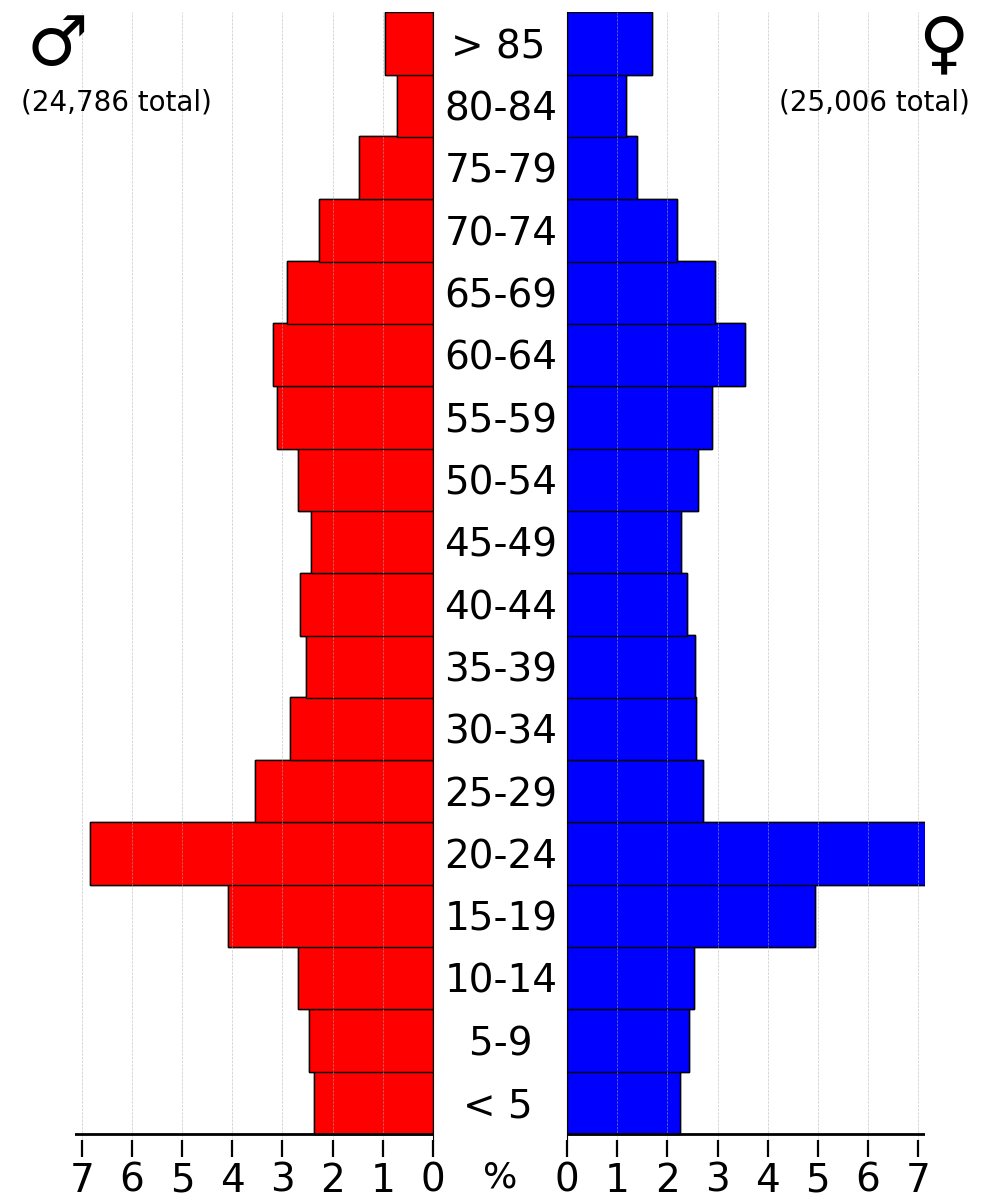
2022 US Census population pyramid for Winona County, from ACS 5-year estimates

As of the census of 2000, there were 49,985 people, 18,744 households, and 11,696 families in the county. The population density was 79.8 per square mile (30.8/km^{2}). There were 19,551 housing units at an average density of 31.2 per square mile (12.0/km^{2}). The racial makeup of the county was 95.80% White, 0.77% Black or African American, 0.19% Native American, 1.87% Asian, 0.02% Pacific Islander, 0.53% from other races, and 0.81% from two or more races. 1.37% of the population were Hispanic or Latino of any race. 41.8% were of German, 13.9% Norwegian, 9.9% Polish and 7.4% Irish ancestry.

There were 18,744 households, out of which 30.20% had children under the age of 18 living with them, 51.30% were married couples living together, 7.80% had a female householder with no husband present, and 37.60% were non-families. 28.20% of all households were made up of individuals, and 10.50% had someone living alone who was 65 years of age or older. The average household size was 2.46 and the average family size was 3.04.

The county population contained 22.80% under the age of 18, 18.60% from 18 to 24, 25.10% from 25 to 44, 20.50% from 45 to 64, and 13.10% who were 65 years of age or older. The median age was 33. For every 100 females there were 95.20 males. For every 100 females age 18 and over, there were 91.8 males.

The median income for a household in the county was $38,700, and the median income for a family was $49,845. Males had a median income of $31,926 versus $23,406 for females. The per capita income for the county was $18,077. About 5.60% of families and 12.00% of the population were below the poverty line, including 9.8% of those under 18 and 9.3% of those age 65 or over.

In 2016, Winona County planning commissioners voted to approve new permits for existing commercial dog breeding operations, also known as "puppy mills", despite overwhelming evidence of animal cruelty and neglect. Due to the high number of kennels in the county, Winona county has earned the dubious title "Puppy Mill Capital of Minnesota".

== Micropolitan Statistical Area ==
The United States Office of Management and Budget (OMB) has designated Winona County as the Winona, MN Micropolitan Statistical Area (μSA), with Winona as its principal city. The US Census Bureau ranked this μSA as the 591st most populous Core Based Statistical Area of the United States as of April 1, 2020.

== Politics ==
Winona County has historically been a swing county at the federal level, but in the 21st century leans Democratic. Winona County's seat is considered a college town due to the presence of Winona State University and Saint Mary's University of Minnesota. In 2016, the county backed Donald Trump, the first time a Republican presidential nominee carried the county since 1988. In 2020, the county backed Joe Biden with a plurality. Trump won the county again in 2024, this time with 51% of the vote. In the 2022 elections, Winona County voted for the Republican nominee for all statewide offices.

United States presidential election results for Winona County, Minnesota
Year	Republican		Democratic		Third party(ies)	
Year	No.	%	No.	%	No.	%
1892	2,734	39.95%	3,701	54.08%	409	5.98%
1896	3,935	51.51%	3,528	46.18%	176	2.30%
1900	3,305	47.35%	3,436	49.23%	239	3.42%
1904	3,734	61.22%	2,063	33.83%	302	4.95%
1908	3,014	48.23%	3,072	49.16%	163	2.61%
1912	1,042	16.54%	3,004	47.68%	2,254	35.78%
1916	2,916	47.94%	2,907	47.80%	259	4.26%
1920	7,888	69.81%	2,896	25.63%	516	4.57%
1924	5,670	43.53%	1,111	8.53%	6,245	47.94%
1928	7,459	53.16%	6,484	46.21%	88	0.63%
1932	4,751	35.70%	8,305	62.41%	252	1.89%
1936	5,353	34.42%	9,268	59.60%	930	5.98%
1940	9,599	56.83%	7,187	42.55%	105	0.62%
1944	8,296	57.19%	6,117	42.17%	93	0.64%
1948	6,880	44.93%	8,281	54.08%	152	0.99%
1952	10,723	64.51%	5,834	35.10%	64	0.39%
1956	9,743	61.30%	6,048	38.05%	102	0.64%
1960	9,271	52.14%	8,484	47.72%	25	0.14%
1964	6,345	35.71%	11,397	64.14%	28	0.16%
1968	7,998	45.85%	8,627	49.46%	818	4.69%
1972	10,910	56.45%	8,080	41.81%	337	1.74%
1976	10,436	47.62%	10,939	49.92%	539	2.46%
1980	10,332	45.11%	9,814	42.85%	2,757	12.04%
1984	11,981	55.03%	9,577	43.99%	212	0.97%
1988	11,012	50.92%	10,310	47.68%	302	1.40%
1992	8,585	35.02%	9,707	39.59%	6,226	25.39%
1996	7,955	36.80%	10,272	47.52%	3,389	15.68%
2000	10,773	45.04%	11,069	46.28%	2,076	8.68%
2004	12,686	46.26%	14,231	51.90%	505	1.84%
2008	10,975	39.29%	16,308	58.38%	652	2.33%
2012	11,480	42.16%	14,980	55.01%	772	2.83%
2016	12,122	46.49%	11,366	43.59%	2,586	9.92%
2020	13,227	48.68%	13,333	49.07%	613	2.26%
2024	14,288	51.40%	12,929	46.51%	580	2.09%

Winona County is represented in the Minnesota House of Representatives by Steve Jacob (R) and Aaron Repinski (R). Jeremy Miller (R) and Steve Drazkowski (R) represent it in the Minnesota Senate. Winona County is in Minnesota's 1st Congressional District, which is represented by Brad Finstad (R).

== Communities ==
=== Cities ===
- Altura
- Dakota
- Elba
- Goodview
- La Crescent (mostly in Houston County)
- Lewiston
- Minneiska (partly in Wabasha County)
- Minnesota City
- Rollingstone
- St. Charles
- Stockton
- Utica
- Winona (county seat)

=== Census-designated place ===
- Dresbach
- Homer
- Pickwick

=== Unincorporated communities ===
- Bethany
- Centerville
- Clyde
- Donehower
- Fremont
- Lamoille
- Nodine
- Oakridge
- Pine Creek
- Ridgeway
- Saratoga
- Troy
- Whitman
- Wilson
- Witoka
- Wyattville

=== Ghost towns ===
- Ashton
- Beaver
- Enterprise
- Grover
- Whitewater Falls
- Clyde

=== Townships ===
- Dresbach
- Elba
- Fremont
- Hart
- Hillsdale
- Homer
- Mount Vernon
- New Hartford
- Norton
- Pleasant Hill
- Richmond
- Rollingstone
- Saint Charles
- Saratoga
- Utica
- Warren
- Whitewater
- Wilson
- Wiscoy

== See also ==
- National Register of Historic Places listings in Winona County, Minnesota
