= Saratoga Township, Winona County, Minnesota =

Saratoga Township, Minnesota
- Township
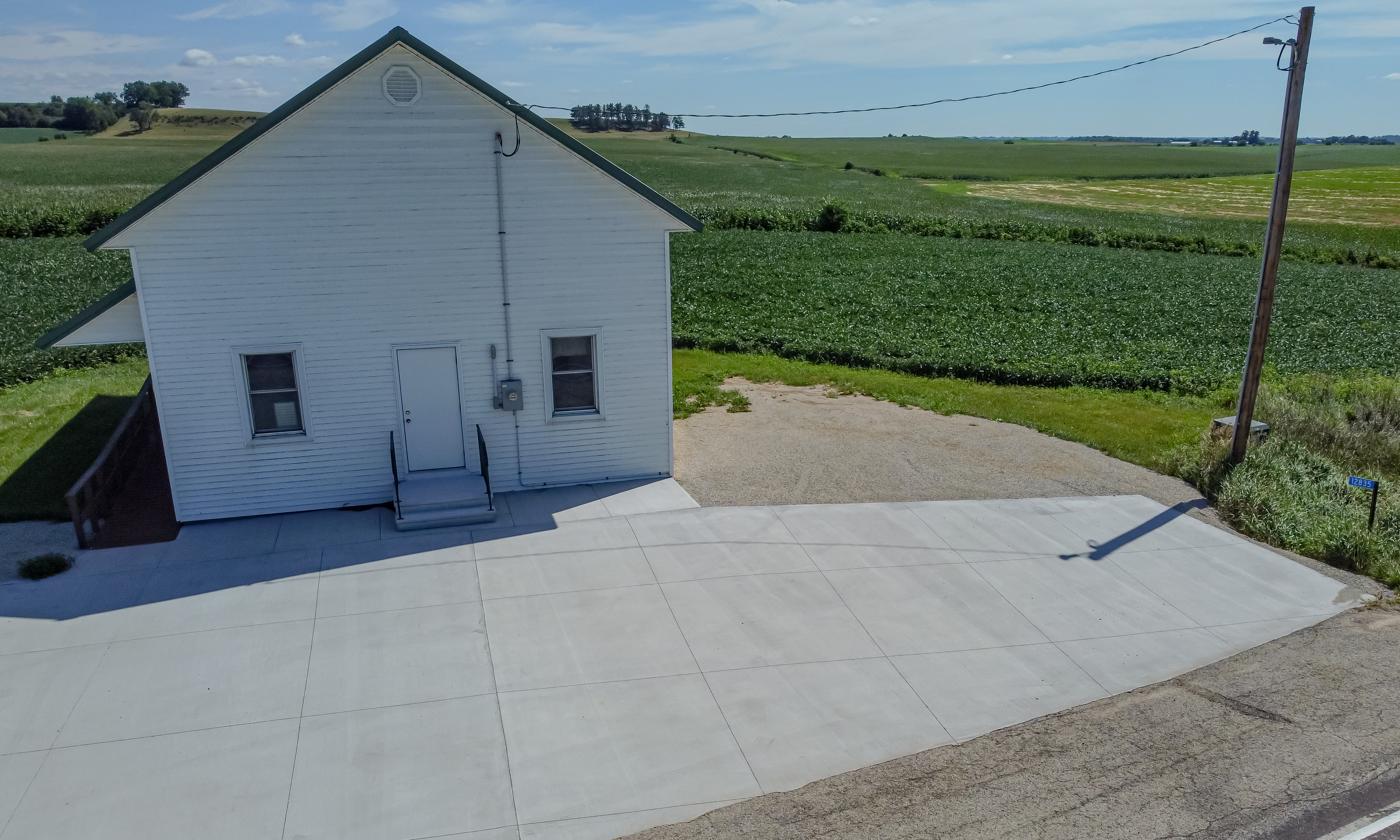
- Town hall at 12835 County Road 6 in Winona County

- Location within the state of Minnesota Saratoga Township, Minnesota (the United States)
- Coordinates: 43°52′30″N 92°1′18″W
- Country: United States
- State: Minnesota
- County: Winona

Area
  - Total: 35.7 sq mi (92.4 km^{2})
  - Land: 35.7 sq mi (92.4 km^{2})
  - Water: 0 sq mi (0.0 km^{2})
- Elevation: 1,138 ft (347 m)

Population (2010)
  - Total: 618
  - Density: 17.3/sq mi (6.69/km^{2})
- Time zone: UTC-6 (Central (CST))
  - Summer (DST): UTC-5 (CDT)
- ZIP code: 55972
- Area code: 507
- FIPS code: 27-58558
- GNIS feature ID: 0665553

Saratoga Township is a township in Winona County, Minnesota. The population was 618 at the time of the 2010 census.

Saratoga Township was organized in 1858.

== Geography ==
According to the United States Census Bureau, the township has a total area of 35.7 square miles (92.4 km^{2}), all land.

== Demographics ==
As of the census of 2000, there were 573 people, 174 households, and 148 families residing in the township. The population density was 16.1 people per square mile (6.2/km^{2}). There were 184 housing units at an average density of 5.2/sq mi (2.0/km^{2}). The racial makeup of the township was 98.78% White, 0.35% Native American, 0.35% Asian, 0.52% from other races. Hispanic or Latino of any race were 0.70% of the population.

There were 174 households, out of which 45.4% had children under the age of 18 living with them, 75.9% were married couples living together, 5.2% had a female householder with no husband present, and 14.9% were non-families. 12.6% of all households were made up of individuals, and 5.2% had someone living alone who was 65 years of age or older. The average household size was 3.29 and the average family size was 3.64.

In the township the population was spread out, with 38.2% under the age of 18, 6.6% from 18 to 24, 26.0% from 25 to 44, 20.1% from 45 to 64, and 9.1% who were 65 years of age or older. The median age was 31 years. For every 100 females, there were 116.2 males. For every 100 females age 18 and over, there were 112.0 males.

The median income for a household in the township was $44,219, and the median income for a family was $47,500. Males had a median income of $35,833 versus $23,438 for females. The per capita income for the township was $16,518. About 10.1% of families and 18.7% of the population were below the poverty line, including 31.1% of those under age 18 and 11.8% of those age 65 or over.

== See also ==
- Saratoga, Minnesota - unincorporated community
