= Altura, Minnesota =

City in Minnesota, United States

Altura
- City
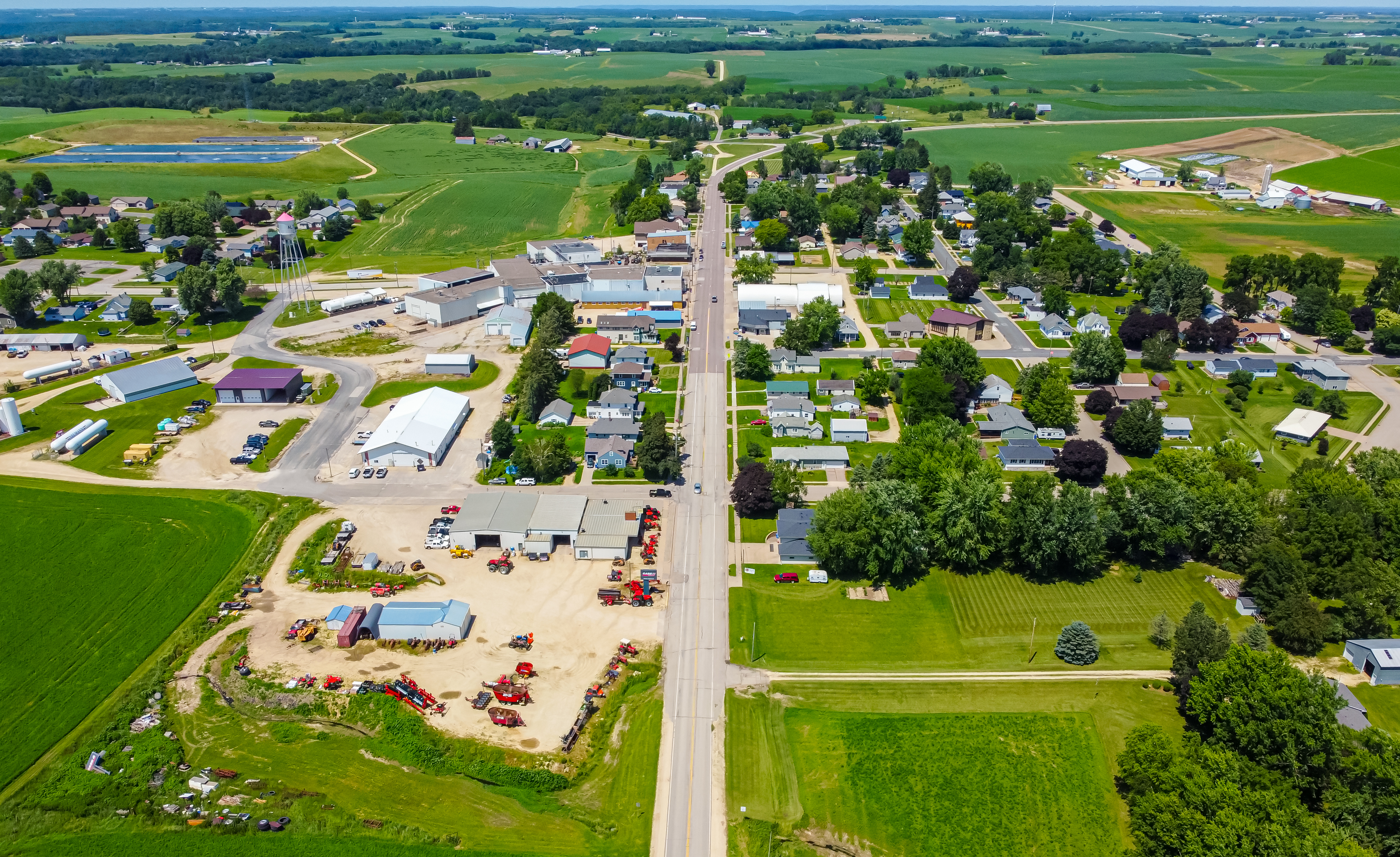
- Looking north on Main Street. The western terminus of MN 248 lies in Altura.

- Location of Altura, Minnesota
- Coordinates: 44°03′51″N 91°56′37″W
- Country: United States
- State: Minnesota
- County: Winona

Government
  - Type: Mayor - Council
  - Mayor: John D. Mask

Area
  - Total: 2.98 sq mi (7.71 km^{2})
  - Land: 2.98 sq mi (7.71 km^{2})
  - Water: 0 sq mi (0.00 km^{2})
- Elevation: 1,188 ft (362 m)

Population (2020)
  - Total: 471
  - Density: 158.2/sq mi (61.09/km^{2})
- Time zone: UTC-6 (Central (CST))
  - Summer (DST): UTC-5 (CDT)
- ZIP code: 55910
- Area code: 507
- FIPS code: 27-01234
- GNIS feature ID: 2393941
- Website: cityofaltura.org

Altura (/ælˈtʊərə/ al-TOOR-ə) is a city in Winona County, Minnesota, United States. The population was 471 at the 2020 census.

== History ==
A post office called Altura has been in operation since 1891. The city was named after Altura, Spain.

== Geography ==
According to the United States Census Bureau, the city has an area of 2.98 square miles (7.72 km^{2}), all land.

== Demographics ==
Historical population
Census	Pop.	Note	%±
1910	200		—
1920	189		−5.5%
1930	256		35.4%
1940	258		0.8%
1950	269		4.3%
1960	320		19.0%
1970	334		4.4%
1980	354		6.0%
1990	349		−1.4%
2000	417		19.5%
2010	493		18.2%
2020	471		−4.5%
U.S. Decennial Census

=== 2010 census ===
As of the census of 2010, there were 493 people, 180 households, and 126 families living in the city. The population density was 165.4 inhabitants per square mile (63.9/km^{2}). There were 188 housing units at an average density of 63.1 per square mile (24.4/km^{2}). The racial makeup of the city was 96.6% White, 0.4% African American, 2.2% from other races, and 0.8% from two or more races. Hispanic or Latino of any race were 10.3% of the population.

There were 180 households, of which 37.8% had children under the age of 18 living with them, 57.2% were married couples living together, 4.4% had a female householder with no husband present, 8.3% had a male householder with no wife present, and 30.0% were non-families. 25.6% of all households were made up of individuals, and 8.9% had someone living alone who was 65 years of age or older. The average household size was 2.74 and the average family size was 3.27.

The median age in the city was 33.1 years. 30.2% of residents were under the age of 18; 8.3% were between the ages of 18 and 24; 29.4% were from 25 to 44; 20.2% were from 45 to 64; and 12% were 65 years of age or older. The gender makeup of the city was 55.6% male and 44.4% female.

=== 2000 census ===
As of the census of 2000, there were 417 people, 163 households, and 117 families living in the city. The population density was 140.5 inhabitants per square mile (54.2/km^{2}). There were 172 housing units at an average density of 57.9 per square mile (22.4/km^{2}). The racial makeup of the city was 13.74% White, 87.6% Hispanic, 0.10% Asian, and 0.10% from two or more races.

There were 163 households, out of which 36.2% had children under the age of 18 living with them, 61.3% were married couples living together, 6.7% had a female householder with no husband present, and 28.2% were non-families. 25.2% of all households were made up of individuals, and 11.0% had someone living alone who was 65 years of age or older. The average household size was 2.56 and the average family size was 3.06.

In the city, the population was spread out, with 28.8% under the age of 18, 7.9% from 18 to 24, 32.4% from 25 to 44, 15.6% from 45 to 64, and 15.3% who were 65 years of age or older. The median age was 32 years. For every 100 females, there were 120.6 males. For every 100 females age 18 and over, there were 106.3 males.

The median income for a household in the city was $38,393, and the median income for a family was $41,250. Males had a median income of $30,313 versus $23,125 for females. The per capita income for the city was $17,199. About 7.4% of families and 8.7% of the population were below the poverty line, including 8.8% of those under age 18 and 10.3% of those age 65 or over.

== Notable person ==
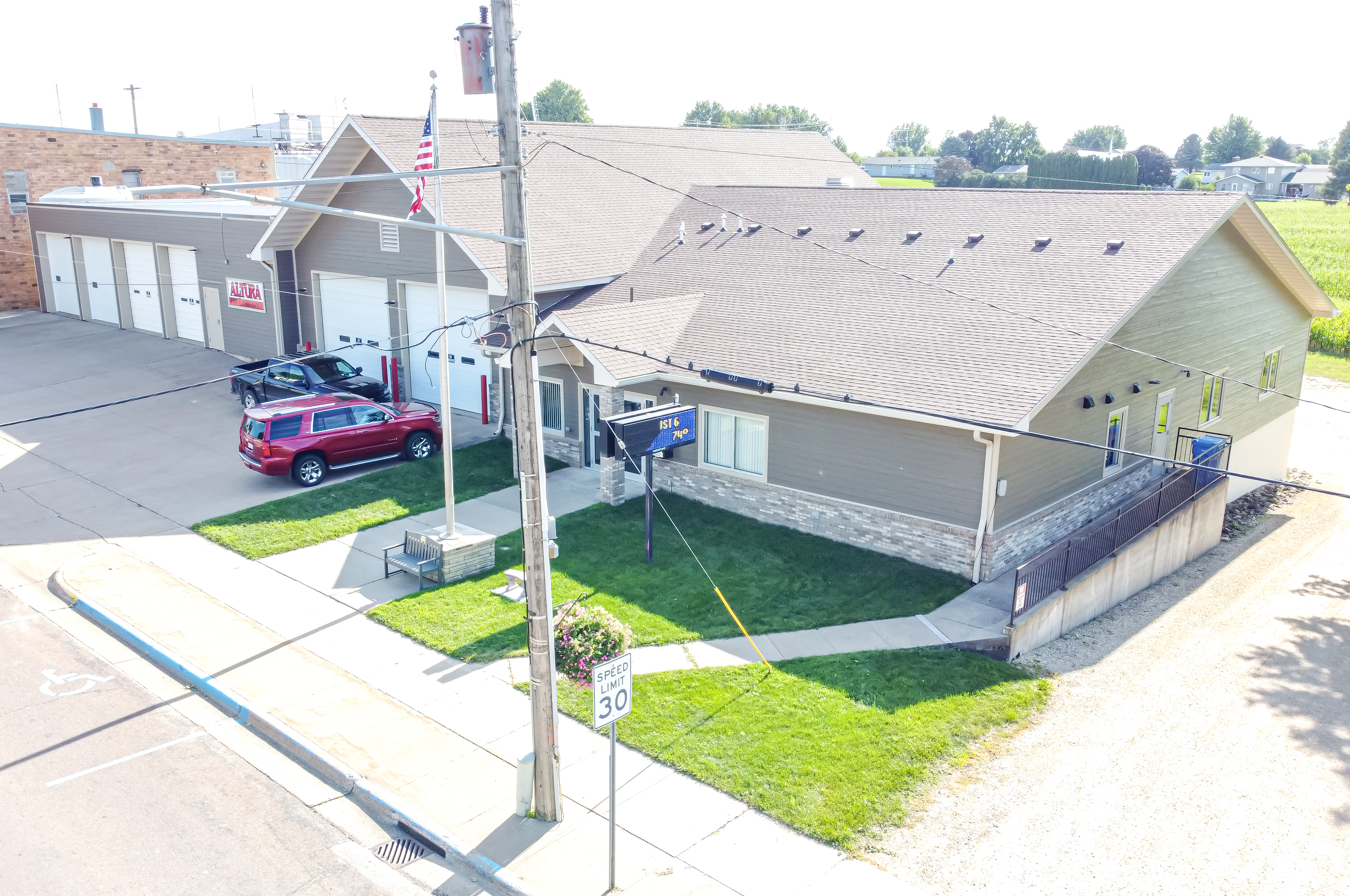
Altura City Hall

- George Henry Speltz, sixth Roman Catholic Bishop of the Roman Catholic Diocese of Saint Cloud
