= Utica, Minnesota =

City in Minnesota, United States

Utica
- City
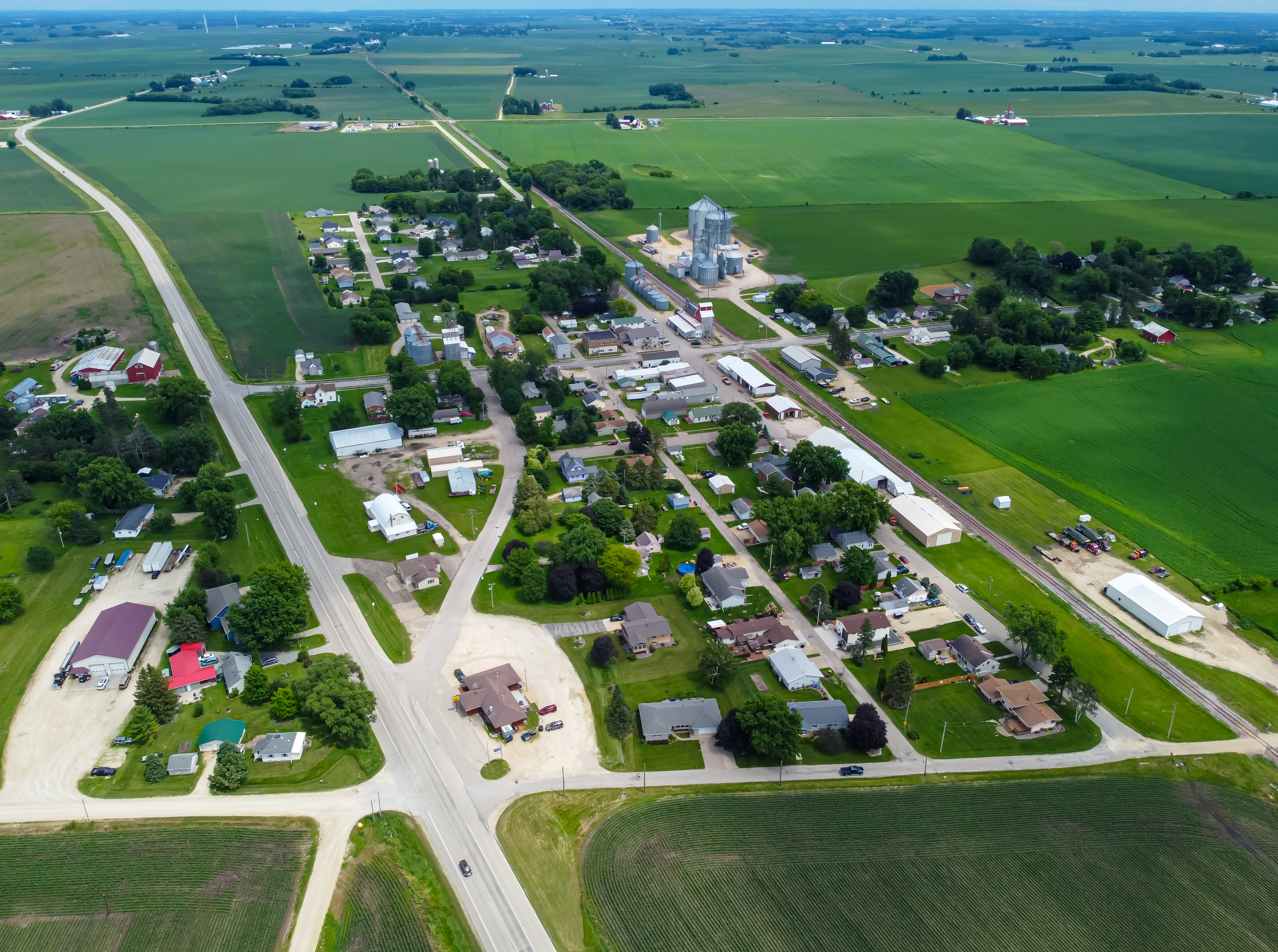
- US-14 runs through town

- Location of Utica, Minnesota
- Coordinates: 43°58′38″N 91°56′58″W
- Country: United States
- State: Minnesota
- County: Winona
- Founded: 1866

Government
  - Type: Mayor - Council

Area
  - Total: 0.99 sq mi (2.56 km^{2})
  - Land: 0.99 sq mi (2.56 km^{2})
  - Water: 0 sq mi (0.00 km^{2})
- Elevation: 1,171 ft (357 m)

Population (2020)
  - Total: 266
  - Estimate (2021): 265
  - Density: 269.4/sq mi (104.02/km^{2})
- Time zone: UTC-6 (CST)
  - Summer (DST): UTC-5 (CDT)
- ZIP code: 55979
- Area code: 507
- FIPS code: 27-66424
- GNIS feature ID: 2397104
- Website: https://www.cityofuticamn.gov/

Utica is a city in Winona County, Minnesota, United States. The population was 266 at the 2020 census.

== History ==
Utica was platted in 1866. The city was named after Utica, New York. The Benjamin Ellsworth House, built in 1873 by the town's founder, is listed on the National Register of Historic Places.

== Geography ==
According to the United States Census Bureau, the city has a total area of 0.93 square miles (2.41 km^{2}), all land.

== Demographics ==
Historical population
Census	Pop.	Note	%±
1900	204		—
1910	172		−15.7%
1920	189		9.9%
1930	181		−4.2%
1940	179		−1.1%
1950	194		8.4%
1960	218		12.4%
1970	240		10.1%
1980	249		3.8%
1990	220		−11.6%
2000	230		4.5%
2010	291		26.5%
2020	266		−8.6%
2021 (est.)	265		−0.4%
U.S. Decennial Census; 2020 Census

=== 2010 census ===
As of the census of 2010, there were 291 people, 105 households, and 71 families living in the city. The population density was 312.9 inhabitants per square mile (120.8/km^{2}). There were 109 housing units at an average density of 117.2 per square mile (45.3/km^{2}). The racial makeup of the city was 95.9% White, 1.7% Native American, and 2.4% from two or more races. Hispanic or Latino of any race were 3.4% of the population.

There were 105 households, of which 33.3% had children under the age of 18 living with them, 58.1% were married couples living together, 5.7% had a female householder with no husband present, 3.8% had a male householder with no wife present, and 32.4% were non-families. 21.0% of all households were made up of individuals, and 7.7% had someone living alone who was 65 years of age or older. The average household size was 2.77 and the average family size was 3.31.

The median age in the city was 34.4 years. 27.8% of residents were under the age of 18; 7.9% were between the ages of 18 and 24; 27.5% were from 25 to 44; 27.8% were from 45 to 64; and 8.9% were 65 years of age or older. The gender makeup of the city was 53.6% male and 46.4% female.

=== 2000 census ===
As of the census of 2000, there were 230 people, 82 households, and 62 families living in the city. The population density was 250.1 inhabitants per square mile (96.6/km^{2}). There were 85 housing units at an average density of 92.4 per square mile (35.7/km^{2}). The racial makeup of the city was 96.96% White, 0.87% Asian, 1.30% from other races, and 0.87% from two or more races. Hispanic or Latino of any race were 7.83% of the population.

There were 82 households, out of which 41.5% had children under the age of 18 living with them, 63.4% were married couples living together, 11.0% had a female householder with no husband present, and 23.2% were non-families. 19.5% of all households were made up of individuals, and 4.9% had someone living alone who was 65 years of age or older. The average household size was 2.76 and the average family size was 3.17.

In the city, the population was spread out, with 29.6% under the age of 18, 10.0% from 18 to 24, 31.3% from 25 to 44, 18.3% from 45 to 64, and 10.9% who were 65 years of age or older. The median age was 32 years. For every 100 females, there were 101.8 males. For every 100 females age 18 and over, there were 102.5 males.

The median income for a household in the city was $43,250, and the median income for a family was $44,286. Males had a median income of $30,500 versus $20,625 for females. The per capita income for the city was $19,185. About 3.3% of families and 3.8% of the population were below the poverty line, including none of those under the age of eighteen and 10.3% of those 65 or over.

== Education ==
Utica is part of the Lewiston-Altura Public School District.

== Notable person ==
- Utica Queen, American drag queen best known for competing on the thirteenth season of RuPaul's Drag Race and the twenty-first season of "Project Runway", was raised in Utica and named her drag persona after the town.

== See also ==
- Utica Township
