= Lewiston, Minnesota =

City in Minnesota, United States

Lewiston
- City
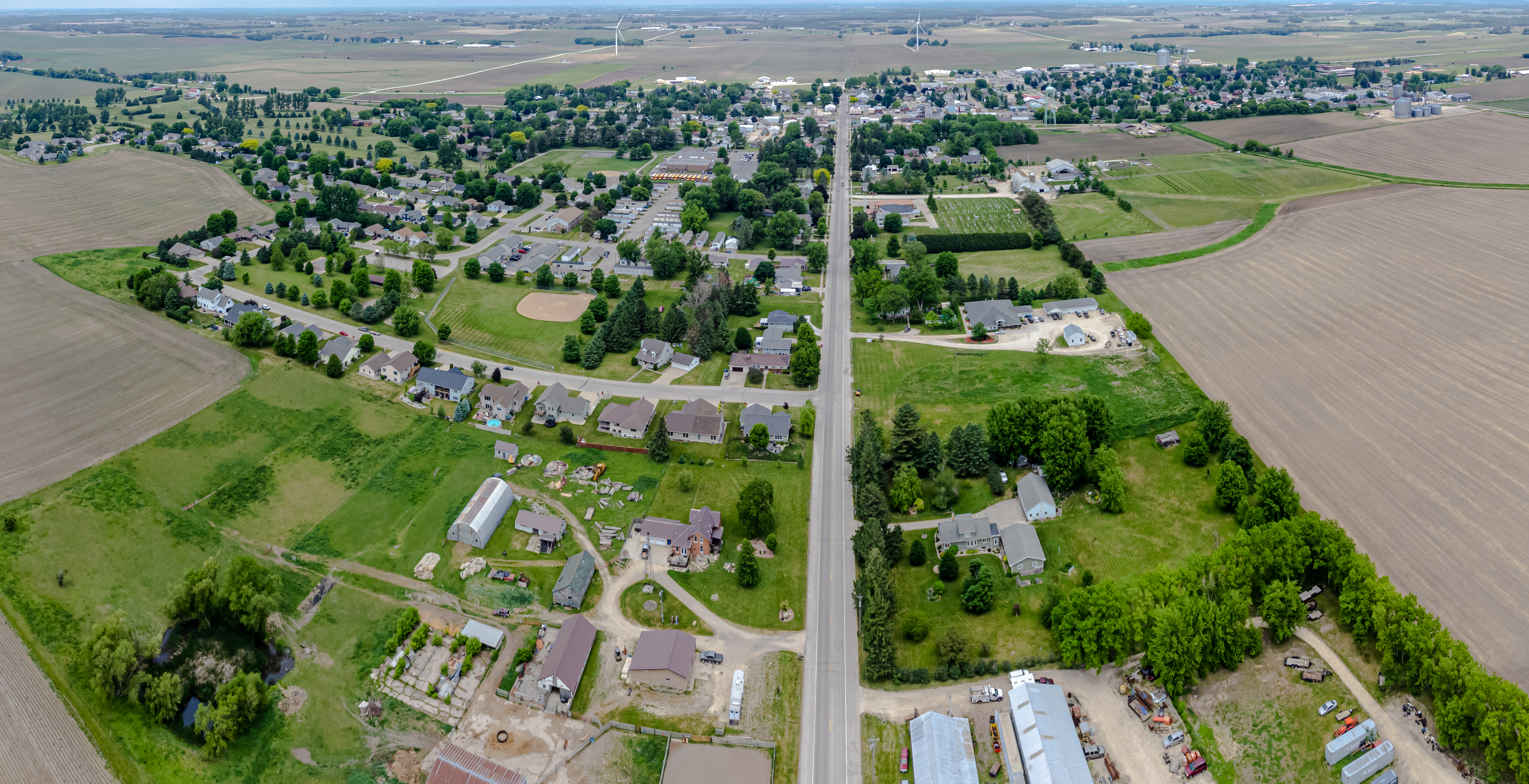

- Location of Lewiston, Minnesota
- Coordinates: 43°58′57″N 91°52′20″W
- Country: United States
- State: Minnesota
- County: Winona

Government
  - Type: Mayor - Council
  - Mayor: Beth Carlson

Area
  - Total: 1.27 sq mi (3.28 km^{2})
  - Land: 1.27 sq mi (3.28 km^{2})
  - Water: 0 sq mi (0.00 km^{2})
- Elevation: 1,214 ft (370 m)

Population (2020)
  - Total: 1,533
  - Density: 1,211.4/sq mi (467.72/km^{2})
- Time zone: UTC-6 (Central (CST))
  - Summer (DST): UTC-5 (CDT)
- ZIP code: 55952
- Area code: 507
- FIPS code: 27-36800
- GNIS feature ID: 2395692
- Website: City of Lewiston

Lewiston is a city in Winona County, Minnesota, United States. The population was 1,533 at the 2020 census.

== History ==
A post office called Lewiston has been in operation since 1872. The city was named for Jonathan Smith Lewis, a pioneer settler. Lewiston was incorporated in 1873. Lewiston - the first stop on the Winona-Rochester stagecoach line - was an important source of support for those travelers.

== Geography ==
According to the United States Census Bureau, the city has a total area of 1.15 square miles (2.98 km^{2}), all land.

== Demographics ==
Historical population
Census	Pop.	Note	%±
1880	241		—
1890	324		34.4%
1900	371		14.5%
1910	473		27.5%
1920	758		60.3%
1930	656		−13.5%
1940	761		16.0%
1950	786		3.3%
1960	890		13.2%
1970	1,000		12.4%
1980	1,226		22.6%
1990	1,298		5.9%
2000	1,484		14.3%
2010	1,620		9.2%
2020	1,533		−5.4%
U.S. Decennial Census

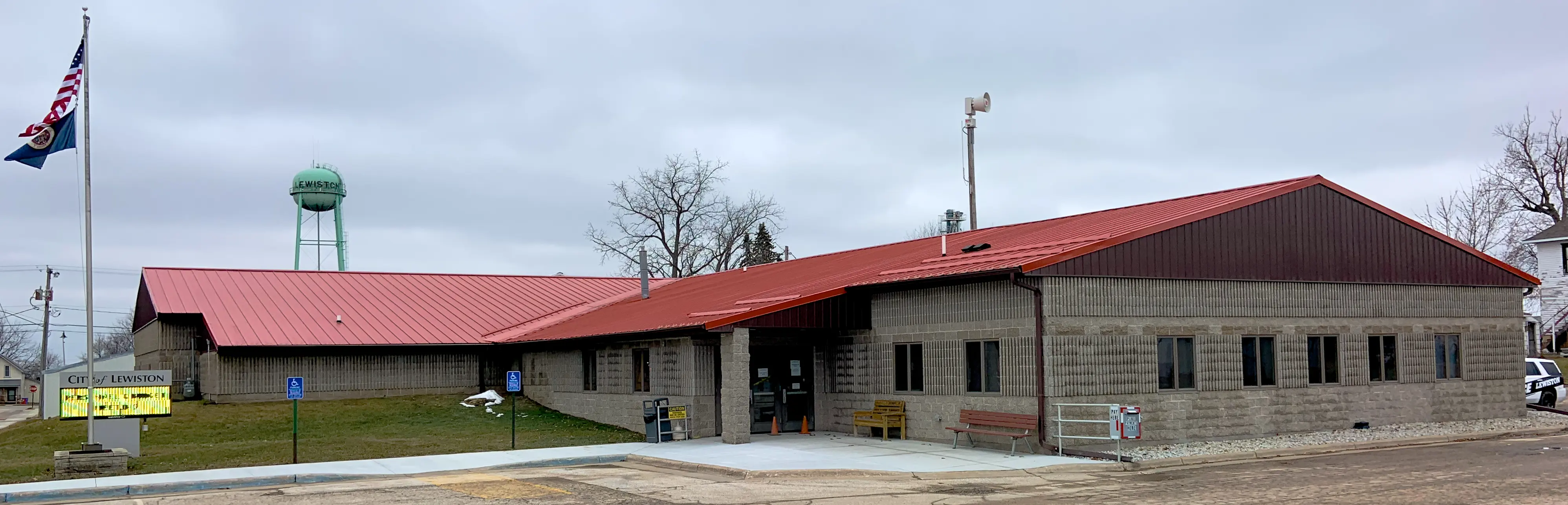
City of Lewiston City hall

=== 2020 census ===
As of the 2020 census, Lewiston had a population of 1,533. The median age was 39.8 years. 25.9% of residents were under the age of 18 and 14.7% of residents were 65 years of age or older. For every 100 females there were 106.0 males, and for every 100 females age 18 and over there were 107.7 males age 18 and over.

0.0% of residents lived in urban areas, while 100.0% lived in rural areas.

There were 572 households in Lewiston, of which 34.6% had children under the age of 18 living in them. Of all households, 54.0% were married-couple households, 18.0% were households with a male householder and no spouse or partner present, and 20.5% were households with a female householder and no spouse or partner present. About 25.7% of all households were made up of individuals and 9.7% had someone living alone who was 65 years of age or older.

There were 606 housing units, of which 5.6% were vacant. The homeowner vacancy rate was 0.9% and the rental vacancy rate was 8.7%.

Racial composition as of the 2020 census
Race	Number	Percent
White	1,365	89.0%
Black or African American	28	1.8%
American Indian and Alaska Native	1	0.1%
Asian	14	0.9%
Native Hawaiian and Other Pacific Islander	0	0.0%
Some other race	58	3.8%
Two or more races	67	4.4%
Hispanic or Latino (of any race)	108	7.0%

=== 2010 census ===
As of the census of 2010, there were 1,622 people, 600 households, and 428 families living in the city. The population density was 1,408.7 inhabitants per square mile (543.9/km^{2}). There were 634 housing units at an average density of 551.3 per square mile (212.9/km^{2}). The racial makeup of the city was 97.0% White, 1.2% African American, 0.1% Native American, 0.7% Asian, 0.4% from other races, and 0.6% from two or more races. Hispanic or Latino of any race were 1.3% of the population.

There were 600 households, of which 38.5% had children under the age of 18 living with them, 59.0% were married couples living together, 8.3% had a female householder with no husband present, 4.0% had a male householder with no wife present, and 28.7% were non-families. 25.0% of all households were made up of individuals, and 11% had someone living alone who was 65 years of age or older. The average household size was 2.62 and the average family size was 3.15.

The median age in the city was 36.2 years. 29.9% of residents were under the age of 18; 5.8% were between the ages of 18 and 24; 26.7% were from 25 to 44; 24.5% were from 45 to 64; and 13.2% were 65 years of age or older. The gender makeup of the city was 50.9% male and 49.1% female.

=== 2000 census ===
As of the census of 2000, there were 1,484 people, 538 households, and 392 families living in the city. The population density was 1,355.9 inhabitants per square mile (523.5/km^{2}). There were 563 housing units at an average density of 514.4 per square mile (198.6/km^{2}). The racial makeup of the city was 98.72% White, 0.61% African American, 0.34% Native American, 0.07% Asian, 0.07% from other races, and 0.20% from two or more races. Hispanic or Latino of any race were 0.88% of the population.

There were 538 households, out of which 40.3% had children under the age of 18 living with them, 60.6% were married couples living together, 7.8% had a female householder with no husband present, and 27.1% were non-families. 24.2% of all households were made up of individuals, and 12.6% had someone living alone who was 65 years of age or older. The average household size was 2.67 and the average family size was 3.19.

In the city, the population was spread out, with 29.7% under the age of 18, 8.0% from 18 to 24, 29.0% from 25 to 44, 18.5% from 45 to 64, and 14.9% who were 65 years of age or older. The median age was 35 years. For every 100 females, there were 96.6 males. For every 100 females age 18 and over, there were 94.2 males.

The median income for a household in the city was $43,220, and the median income for a family was $48,631. Males had a median income of $32,037 versus $22,083 for females. The per capita income for the city was $17,666. About 4.7% of families and 5.7% of the population were below the poverty line, including 7.0% of those under age 18 and 7.5% of those age 65 or over.

== Religion ==
St. John's Lutheran Church is a member of the Wisconsin Evangelical Lutheran Synod (WELS) in Lewiston.

Immanuel Lutheran Church is a member of the Lutheran Church Missouri Synod (LCMS) in Lewiston.

== Education ==
Lewiston-Altura public school is mainly located in Lewiston.

St. John's Lutheran School is a preschool and K-8 school operated by the Wisconsin Evangelical Lutheran Synod (WELS) in Lewiston.

Immanuel Lutheran School (Silo) is a K-8 school operated by the Lutheran Church Missouri Synod (LCMS) in Lewiston.
