= Dresbach =

Dresbach may refer to:

== People ==
- August Dresbach (1894–1968), German politician
- Edward E. Dresbach (born 1863), American politician from Ohio
- George B. Dresbach (1827–1887), American politician from Missouri

== Places ==
- Dresbach–Hunt–Boyer House, house in Davis, California
- Dresbach Formation, geologic formation in Wisconsin
- Dresbach Township, Winona County, Minnesota, township in Minnesota, United States
  - Dresbach, Minnesota, unincorporated community of Dresbach Township

== Other ==
- Dresbach Bridge, bridge over the Mississippi River
