= Lamoille, Minnesota =

Unincorporated community in Minnesota, United States

Lamoille
- Unincorporated community
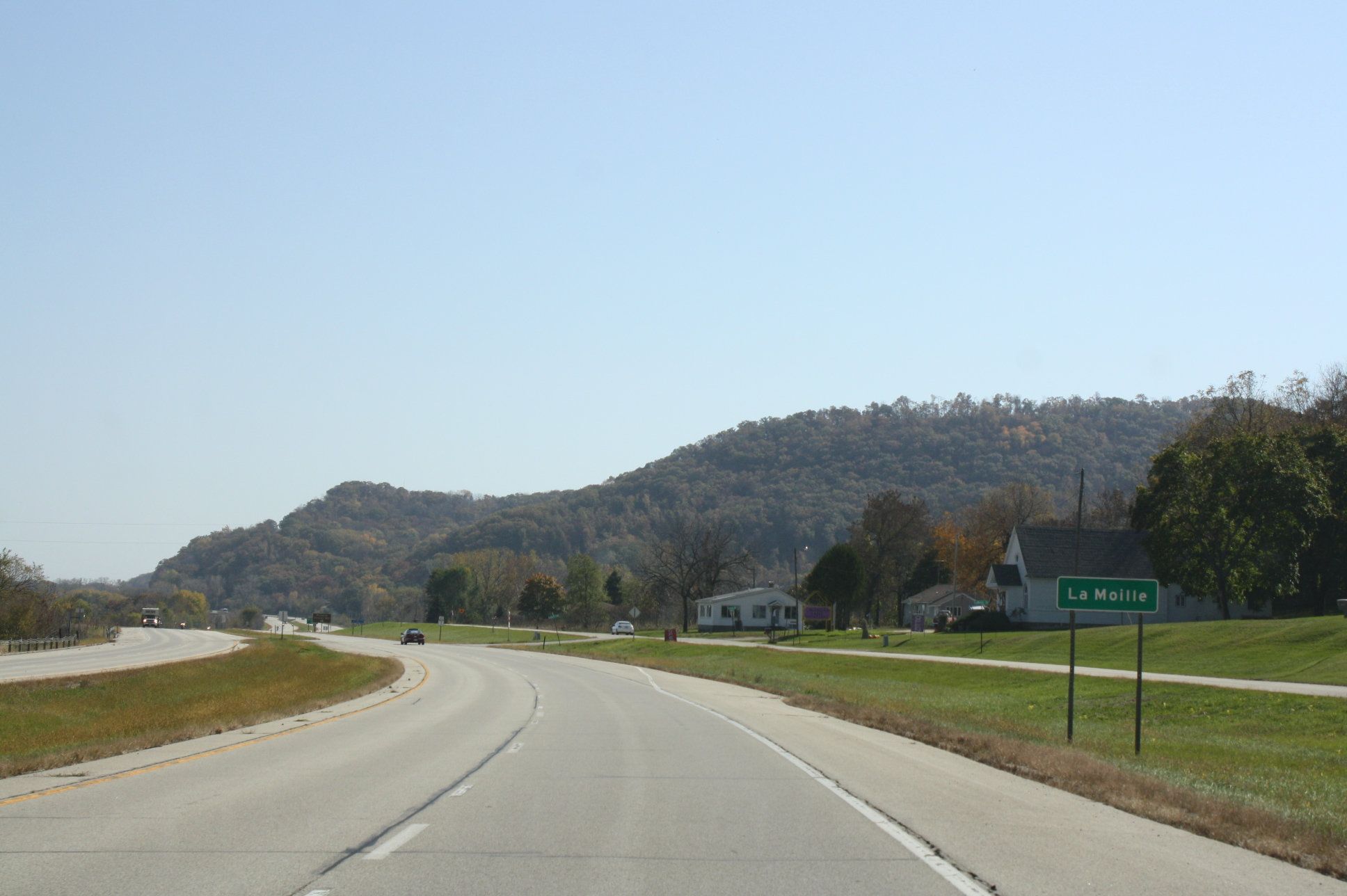
- Signpost for La Moille

- Location within Minnesota Location within the United States
- Coordinates: 44°00′08″N 91°28′21″W
- Country: United States
- State: Minnesota
- County: Winona County
- Township: Richmond Township
- Elevation: 679 ft (207 m)
- Time zone: UTC-6 (Central (CST))
  - Summer (DST): UTC-5 (CDT)
- ZIP code: 55987
- Area code: 507
- GNIS feature ID: 646461

Lamoille (also spelled La Moille) is an unincorporated community in Richmond Township, Winona County, Minnesota, United States. Big Trout Creek and the Mississippi River meet at Lamoille.

== Geography ==
The community is located 9 miles southeast of Winona along Highways 61 and 14, at the junction with Winona County Road 7. Great River Bluffs State Park and Interstate 90 are also nearby. Other nearby places include Winona, Homer, Pickwick, Donehower, Dakota, and Dresbach.

== History ==
Lamoille took its name from the Lamoille River and Lamoille County in Vermont. It developed at a point where a stagecoach route crossed the Mississippi River and the community was platted in 1860. Lamoille had a post office from 1858 to 1975.

== Transportation ==
Amtrak’s Empire Builder, which operates between Seattle/Portland and Chicago, passes through the town on BNSF tracks, but makes no stop. The nearest station is located in Winona, 10 miles (16 km) to the west.
