= Homer, Minnesota =

Unincorporated community in Minnesota, US

Homer
- Census-designated place (CDP) and Unincorporated community
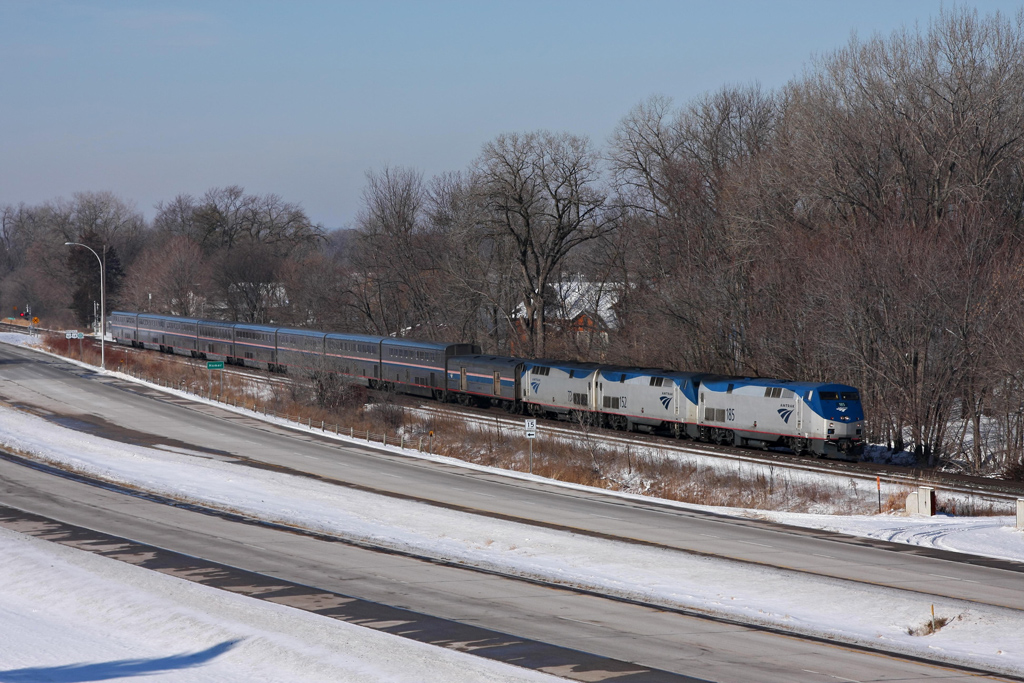
- The Empire Builder passing through Homer in 2012

- Location within Minnesota
- Coordinates: 44°00′30″N 91°33′36″W
- Country: United States
- State: Minnesota
- County: Winona County
- Township: Homer Township

Area
  - Total: 1.23 sq mi (3.18 km^{2})
  - Land: 1.19 sq mi (3.07 km^{2})
  - Water: 0.042 sq mi (0.11 km^{2})
- Elevation: 1,112 ft (339 m)

Population (2020)
  - Total: 189
  - Density: 159.4/sq mi (61.55/km^{2})
- Time zone: UTC-6 (Central (CST))
  - Summer (DST): UTC-5 (CDT)
- ZIP code: 55987
- Area code: 507
- GNIS feature ID: 2628681

Homer is an unincorporated community and census-designated place (CDP) in Homer Township, Winona County, Minnesota, United States, on the south bank of the Mississippi River. As of the 2020 census, Homer had a population of 189.

== Geography ==
The community is located to the immediate southeast of the city of Winona along Highways 61 and 14, near the junction with Winona County Road 15. Pleasant Valley Creek and Homer Creek both flow nearby. Nearby places include Winona, Lamoille, Pickwick, Donehower, Dakota, and Dresbach.

== History ==
Homer was platted in 1855, and named after Homer, New York. The community contained a post office from 1855 until 1965. The Willard Bunnell House, built in the 1850s by Homer's founder, is listed on the National Register of Historic Places and is managed as a historic house museum.

Historical population
Census	Pop.	Note	%±
1860	96		—
1870	91		−5.2%
1880	64		−29.7%
2010	181		—
2020	189		4.4%
U.S. Decennial Census

== Transportation ==
Amtrak’s Empire Builder, which operates between Seattle/Portland and Chicago, passes through the town on BNSF tracks, but makes no stop. The nearest station is located in Winona, 6 miles (9.7 km) to the west.
