= Homer Township, Winona County, Minnesota =

Homer Township, Minnesota
- Township
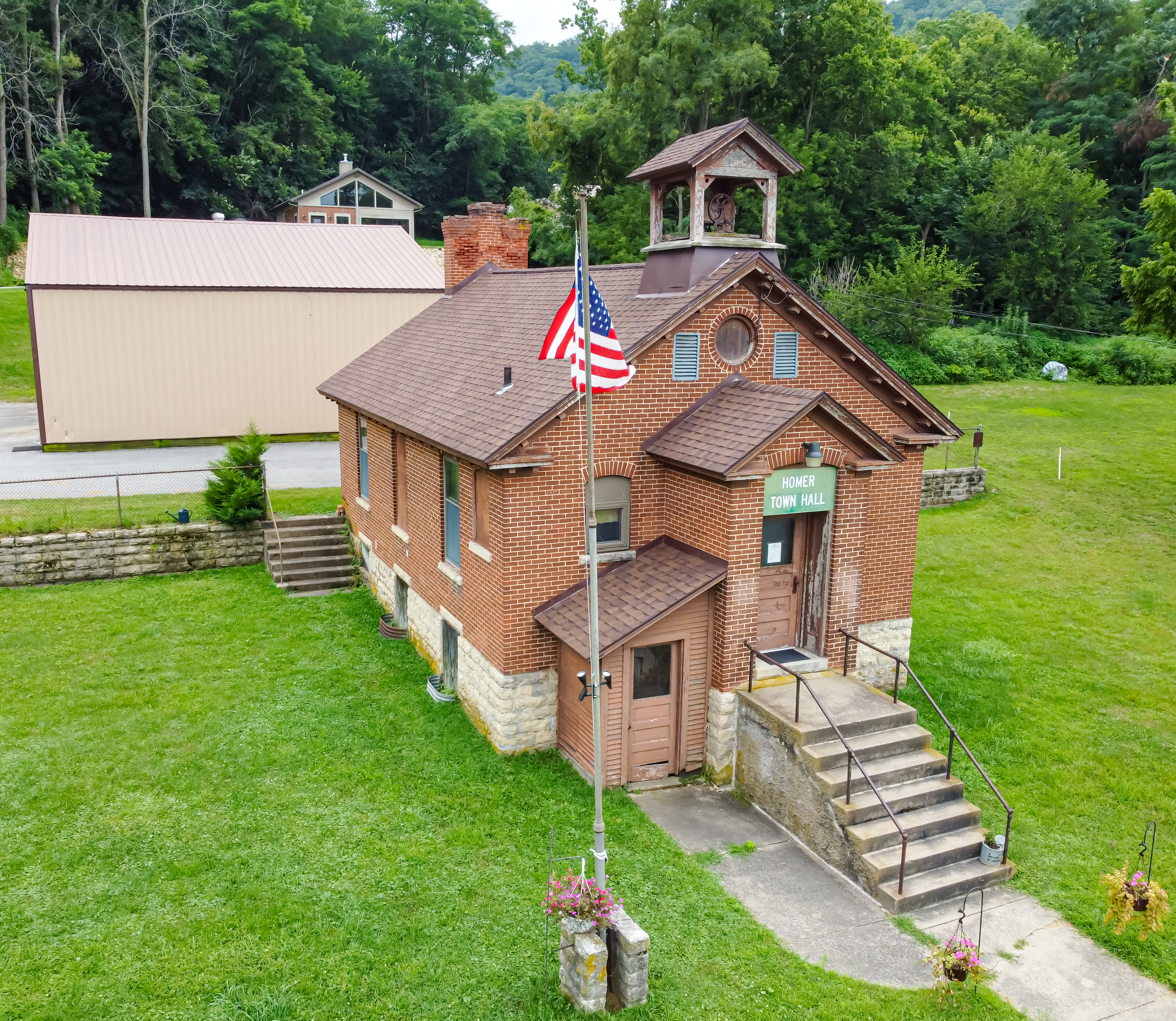
- Town hall at 36087 Old Homer Road in Winona County

- Location within the state of Minnesota Homer Township, Minnesota (the United States)
- Coordinates: 44°0′13″N 91°34′7″W
- Country: United States
- State: Minnesota
- County: Winona

Area
  - Total: 36.5 sq mi (94.5 km^{2})
  - Land: 35.5 sq mi (91.9 km^{2})
  - Water: 1.0 sq mi (2.6 km^{2})
- Elevation: 790 ft (240 m)

Population (2010)
  - Total: 1,356
  - Density: 38.2/sq mi (14.8/km^{2})
- Time zone: UTC-6 (Central (CST))
  - Summer (DST): UTC-5 (CDT)
- ZIP code: 55987
- Area code: 507
- FIPS code: 27-30032
- GNIS feature ID: 0664514
- Website: https://www.homertownshipmn.us/

Homer Township is a township in Winona County, Minnesota, United States. The population was 1,356 at the 2010 census. It contains the census-designated places of Homer and Pickwick.

Homer Township was organized in 1858, and named after Homer, New York.

== Geography ==
According to the United States Census Bureau, the township has a total area of 36.5 square miles (95 km^{2}); 35.5 square miles (92 km^{2}) is land and 1.0 square mile (2.6 km^{2}), or 2.79%, is water. The township contains two properties listed on the National Register of Historic Places: the Willard Bunnell House and the Pickwick Mill, both dating to the 1850s.

== Demographics ==
As of the census of 2000, there were 1,472 people, 534 households, and 440 families residing in the township. The population density was 41.5 inhabitants per square mile (16.0/km^{2}). There were 571 housing units at an average density of 16.1 per square mile (6.2/km^{2}). The racial makeup of the township was 98.71% White, 0.27% African American, 0.14% Native American, 0.48% Asian, 0.07% from other races, and 0.34% from two or more races. Hispanic or Latino of any race were 0.41% of the population.

There were 534 households, out of which 37.8% had children under the age of 18 living with them, 74.9% were married couples living together, 3.9% had a female householder with no husband present, and 17.6% were non-families. 12.2% of all households were made up of individuals, and 4.1% had someone living alone who was 65 years of age or older. The average household size was 2.76 and the average family size was 3.00.

In the township the population was spread out, with 25.6% under the age of 18, 6.4% from 18 to 24, 27.2% from 25 to 44, 31.4% from 45 to 64, and 9.4% who were 65 years of age or older. The median age was 40 years. For every 100 females, there were 111.8 males. For every 100 females age 18 and over, there were 106.6 males.

The median income for a household in the township was $53,693, and the median income for a family was $57,500. Males had a median income of $37,917 versus $26,364 for females. The per capita income for the township was $22,864. About 1.6% of families and 2.1% of the population were below the poverty line, including 1.1% of those under age 18 and 3.8% of those age 65 or over.

== See also ==
- Great River Bluffs State Park
