= Pine Creek, Minnesota =

Unincorporated community in Minnesota, United States

Pine Creek
- Unincorporated community
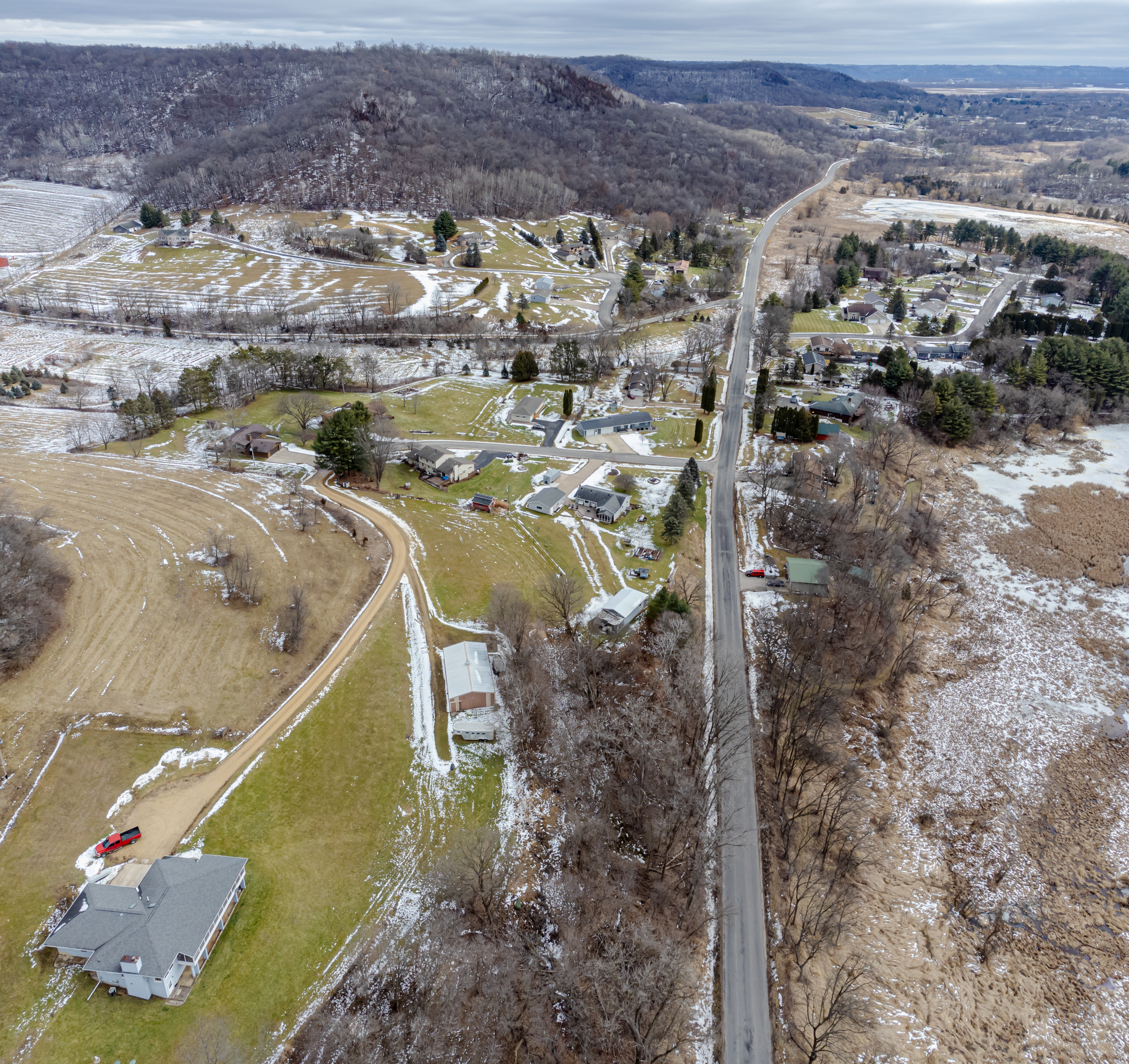

- Location within Minnesota Location within the United States
- Coordinates: 43°50′43″N 91°24′13″W
- Country: United States
- State: Minnesota
- County: Houston and Winona
- Township: La Crescent Township and New Hartford Township
- Elevation: 709 ft (216 m)
- Time zone: UTC-6 (Central (CST))
  - Summer (DST): UTC-5 (CDT)
- ZIP code: 55947
- Area code: 507
- GNIS feature ID: 654881

Pine Creek is an unincorporated community in Houston and Winona counties in the U.S. state of Minnesota.

The community is located along Houston County Road 6 near its junction with Creamery Road. Pine Creek flows through the community.

Nearby places include La Crescent, Dresbach, Dakota, Nodine, Pleasant Hill Township, and Mound Prairie Township.

Pine Creek is located within La Crescent Township in Houston County; and also located within New Hartford Township in Winona County. The community is located in section 2 of La Crescent Township, and also located in section 35 of New Hartford Township.

The community is located within ZIP code 55947, based in La Crescent.
