= Donehower, Minnesota =

Unincorporated community in Minnesota, United States

Donehower
- Unincorporated community
- Location within Minnesota Location within the United States
- Coordinates: 43°57′40″N 91°24′24″W
- Country: United States
- State: Minnesota
- County: Winona County
- Township: Richmond Township
- Elevation: 676 ft (206 m)
- Time zone: UTC-6 (Central (CST))
  - Summer (DST): UTC-5 (CDT)
- ZIP code: 55987
- Area code: 507
- GNIS feature ID: 654675

Donehower is an unincorporated community in Richmond Township, Winona County, Minnesota, United States.

The community is located southeast of Winona along Highways 61 and 14, near the junction with Winona County Road 3. Richmond Creek flows through the community, with the Mississippi River located nearby.

Nearby places include Winona, Lamoille, Dakota, Dresbach, Nodine, and La Crescent.

Great River Bluffs State Park and Interstate 90 are also nearby.
