= Pickwick, Minnesota =

Unincorporated community in Minnesota, United States

Pickwick
- Unincorporated community and Census designated place
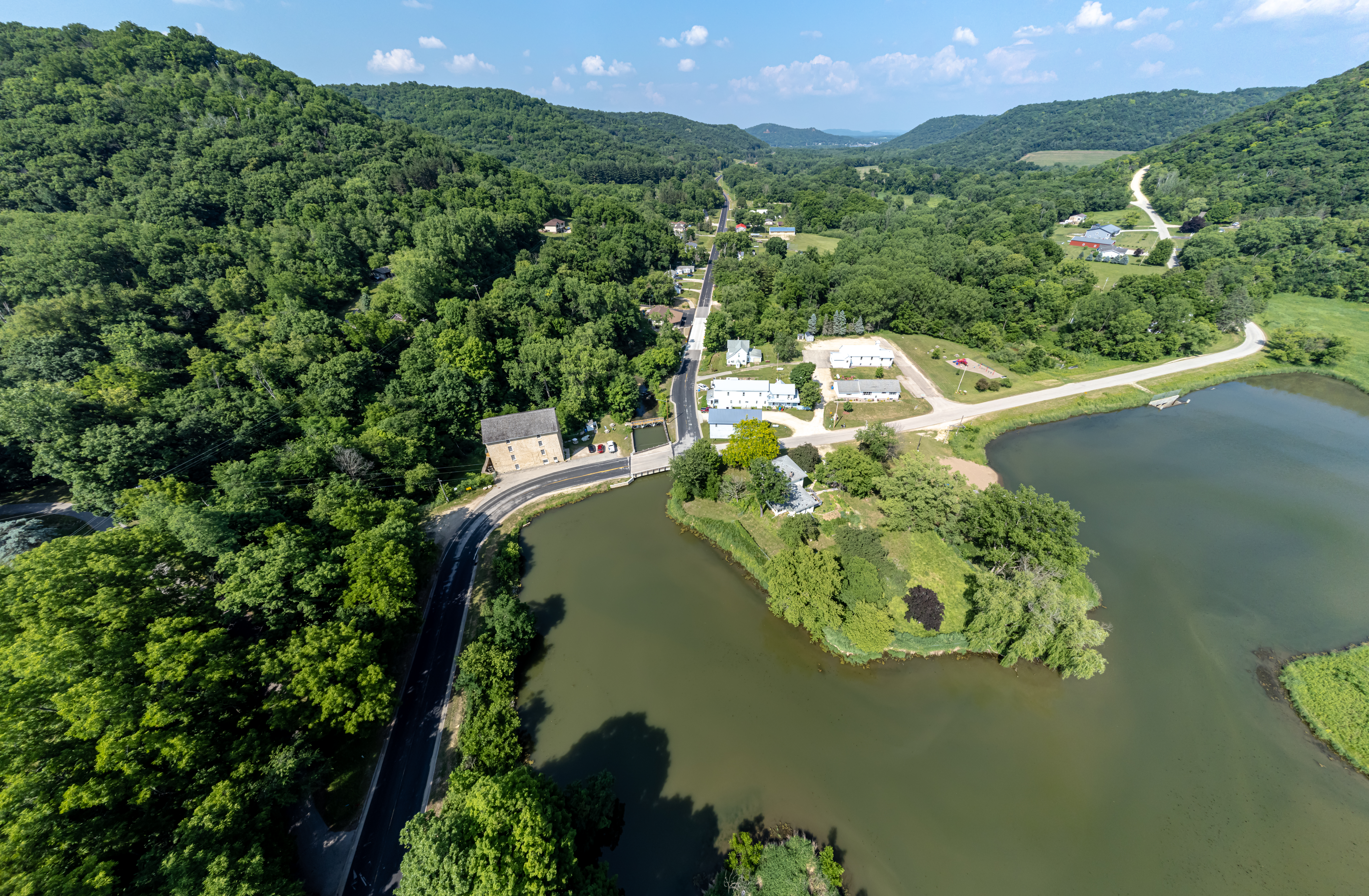
- Pickwick, with the 1850s Pickwick Mill and millpond

- Location within Minnesota Location within the United States
- Coordinates: 43°58′50″N 91°29′42″W
- Country: United States
- State: Minnesota
- County: Winona County
- Township: Homer Township

Area
  - Total: 0.64 sq mi (1.66 km^{2})
  - Land: 0.64 sq mi (1.66 km^{2})
  - Water: 0 sq mi (0.00 km^{2})
- Elevation: 702 ft (214 m)

Population (2020)
  - Total: 157
  - Density: 244.6/sq mi (94.45/km^{2})
- Time zone: UTC-6 (Central (CST))
  - Summer (DST): UTC-5 (CDT)
- ZIP code: 55987
- Area code: 507
- GNIS feature ID: 2806366

Pickwick is an unincorporated community in Homer Township, Winona County, Minnesota, United States. As of the 2020 census, Pickwick had a population of 157.

== Geography ==
The community is located along Winona County Road 7 near its junction with Little Trout Valley Road. Highways 61 and 14 (co-signed) are nearby. Big Trout Creek and Little Trout Creek meet near Pickwick. Nearby places include Winona, Homer, Lamoille, Donehower, and Dakota.

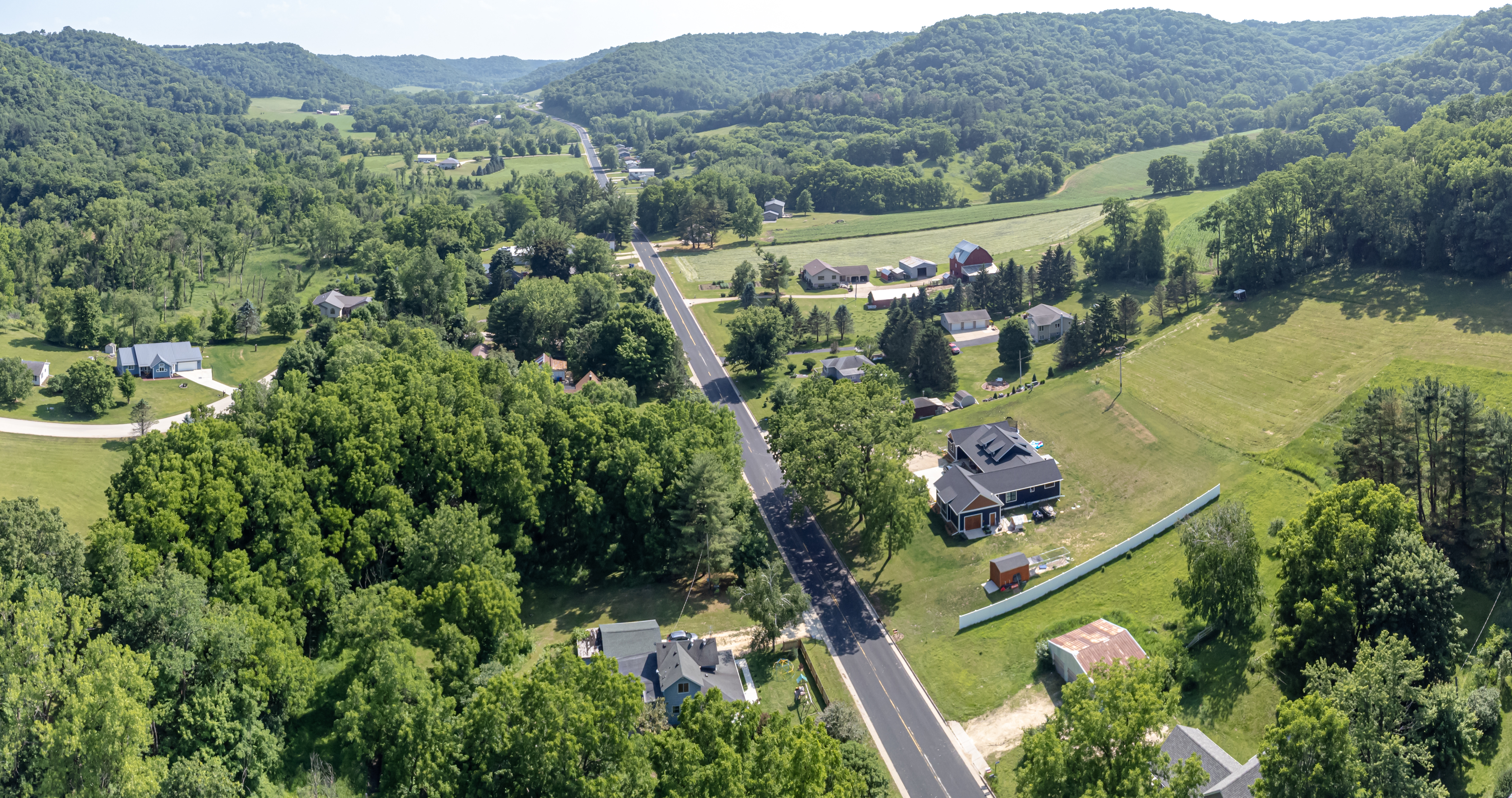
Looking south

== Demographics ==
Historical population
Census	Pop.	Note	%±
2020	157		—
U.S. Decennial Census

== History ==
In 1854, G. W. T. Grant held a land claim for the area that now holds the Pickwick Mill. His family lived in a cabin owned by an Ira Hammond, which was situated on 1,200 acres near La Moille. and modern day Highway 3. On June 19 of that year, Jason E. Rutherford, his wife (sister of G. W. T. Grant's wife, Cynthia Higley McNaughton), their family, and Jason's brother B. W. Rutherford traveled from Ohio through Little Trout Valley in a covered wagon, where they camped at the site that eventually became Pickwick. The next day, they met with the Grant family at Ira Hammond's cabin.

The Rutherfords and Grants traveled up Pickwick Valley where the Rutherfords established a land claim and began cutting logs for a cabin that would be erected that Summer by the Rutherford brothers, Grant, Edward Huttenhower, Jamies Halligan, O.B. Dodge, and Charles Howe, which became the first building built in the valley. The Rutherford family lived in their covered wagon for six weeks until the cabin was complete, then the Grants moved in with them, making 14 people living in a small log cabin for the summer.

As the summer bore on, the Grants built a cabin (Where O. Sistad's property was in 1904) and moved in. In July, B. W. Rutherford returned to Ohio, then in September the Grants and Rutherfords traveled to Delaware County, Iowa.

On April 25, 1855, the Rutherfords and Grants returned, accompanied by the families of M. G. Stedman, Alexander Stedman, Calvin Grant, Andrew Finch, J. L. Finch, and Eli Branch, all with covered wagons and livestock consisting of hogs and cattle. The Stedmans, Calvin Grant, and the Finches broke off to stake claims in Pleasant Hill.

== The Pickwick Mill ==
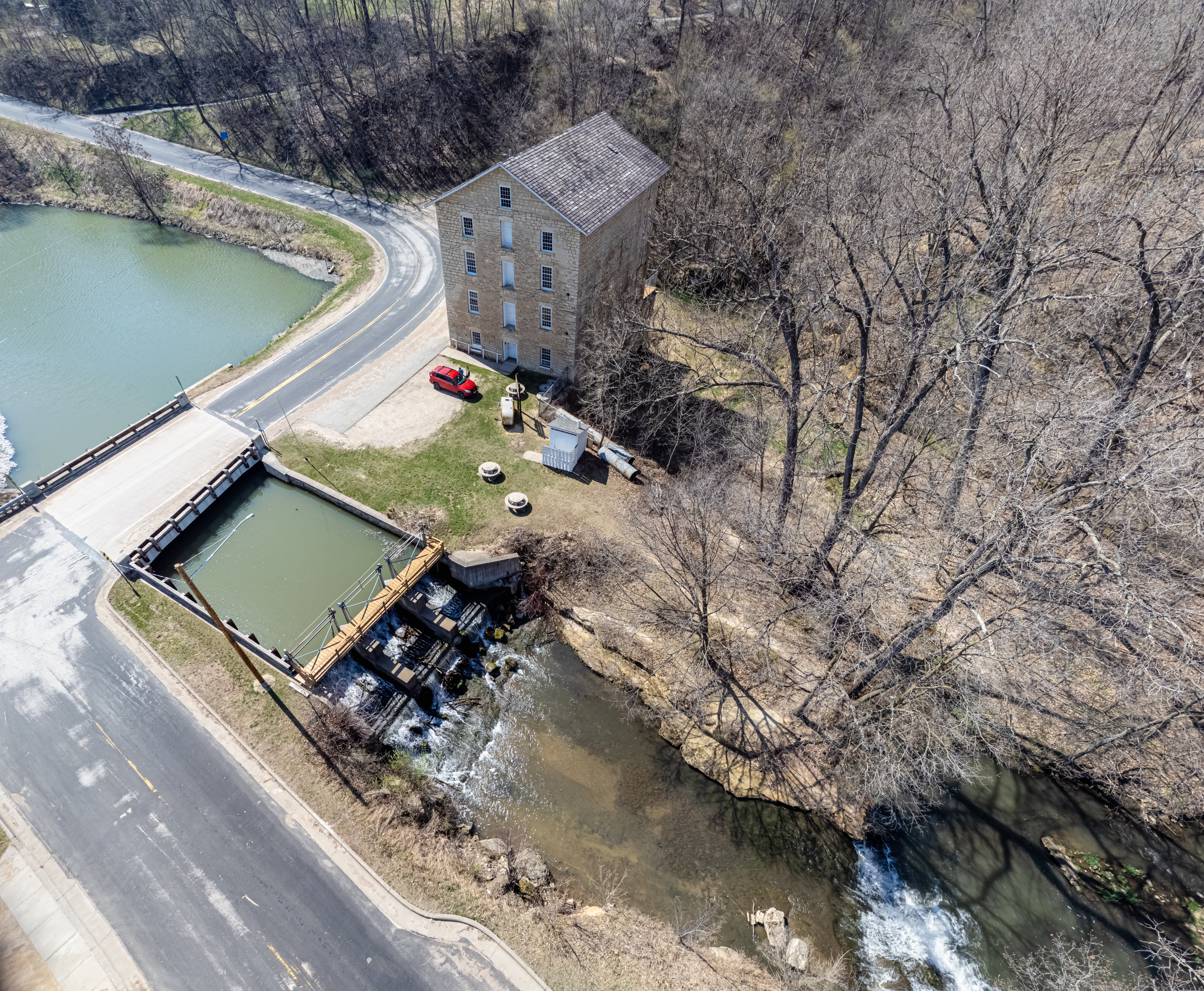
Pickwick Mill aerial photo

G. W. T. Grant built another cabin, this time across from the site of the modern Pickwick Mill. He built a dam made of either dirt or clay, only to have it washed out that winter. Grant rebuilt the dam as a crib dam with wooden supports to withstand stronger water pressure. He included a saw mill to continue expansion as well as a set of burrs for grinding flour.

This expansion continued until 1858 when the stone building that constitutes the Pickwick Mill was completed. Soon after, Grant sold his interest in the Mill to Wilson Davis. In spring 1856, Timothy sold his interest to his son, Wilson Davis, who built a small store and ran the mill.

== Pickwick Village ==
Pickwick was platted in 1857, and named by Cynthia Grant, G. W. T. Grant's wife, after The Pickwick Papers, a novel by Charles Dickens.

Pickwick experienced reasonable growth with the establishment of the mill in 1858, by which time the town had the small store established by Timothy Davis but bought by Ferdinand Cox, a blacksmith shop, and a wagon shop. A small building owned by the mill was established as a school, and a post office was kept by Charles Sufferins. In 1861, Charles Sufferins was appointed postmaster of the Pickwick post office and purchased an interest in the local store. A new school building was erected by the district in either 1861 or 1863.

During the Civil War, business boomed for the Pickwick Mill, which ran constantly to create flour for the Union Army at approximately 100 barrels a day.

On November 11, 1873, the Freemasons established a chapter in the upstairs section of Sufferins' store. The masons resided there until 1919 when convened with the Order of the Eastern Star and purchased a "Gates Store." (Currently the building used by the Pickwick Mill Historical Society to show their introductory tour film.)

The 1850s Pickwick Mill is listed on the National Register of Historic Places and operates as a museum.
