= Nodine, Minnesota =

Unincorporated community in Minnesota, United States

Nodine
- Unincorporated community
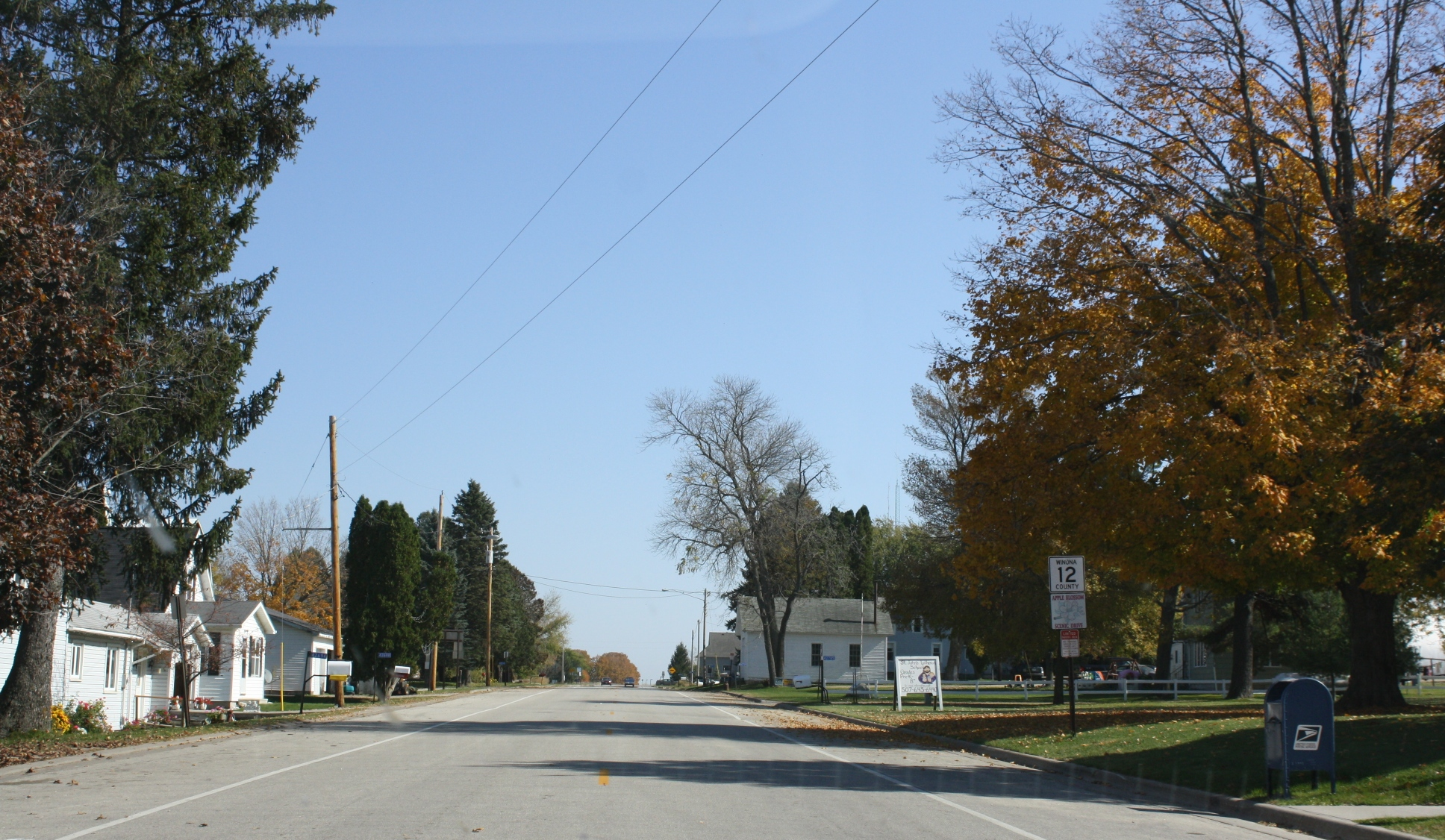
- Nodine along County Road 12

- Location within Minnesota Location within the United States
- Coordinates: 43°54′18″N 91°26′11″W
- Country: United States
- State: Minnesota
- County: Winona County
- Township: New Hartford Township
- Elevation: 1,276 ft (389 m)
- Time zone: UTC-6 (Central (CST))
  - Summer (DST): UTC-5 (CDT)
- ZIP code: 55925
- Area code: 507
- GNIS feature ID: 648566

Nodine is an unincorporated community in New Hartford Township, Winona County, Minnesota, United States.

The community is located along Winona County Road 12 and the Apple Blossom Scenic Drive, one mile south of Interstate 90. County Roads 5 and 16 are also in the immediate area.

Nearby places include Winona, Dakota, Dresbach, Donehower, Ridgeway, Pine Creek, and La Crescent.

Nodine is located within the Richard J. Dorer Memorial Hardwood State Forest, and the driftless area of southeast Minnesota. Great River Bluffs State Park is nearby.

The Nodine Culvert Man, a business attraction for Nodine Culvert Company, stands in the community, approximately 30 feet tall. Nodine, Minnesota.jpg

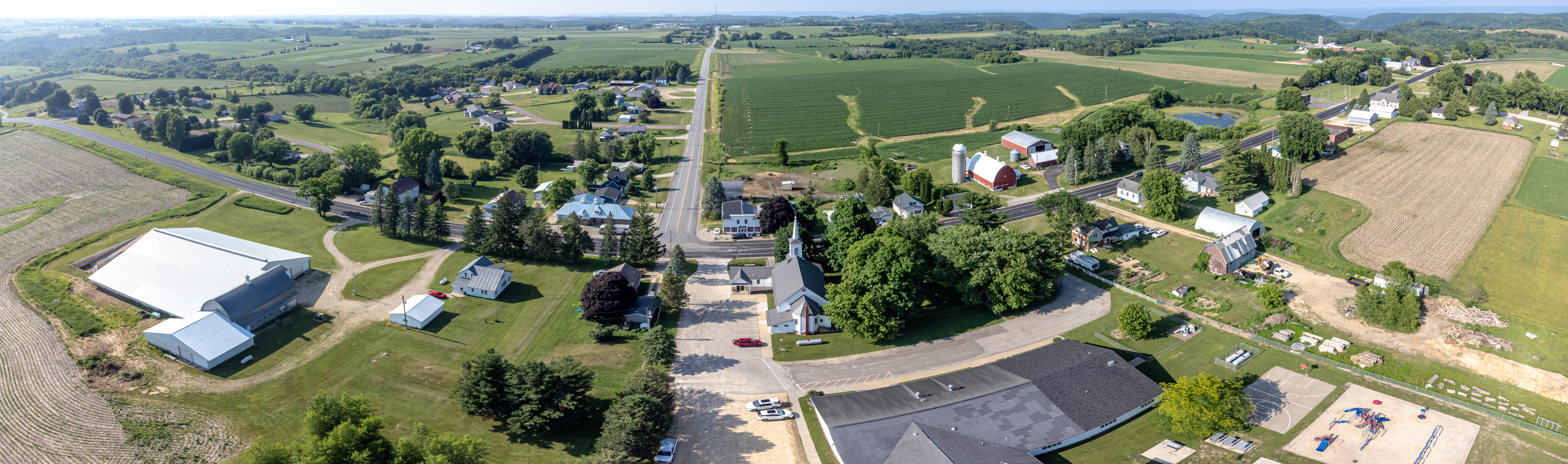

== Education ==
St. John’s Lutheran School is a Pre-K-8 Christian school of the Wisconsin Evangelical Lutheran Synod in Nodine.

== Images ==
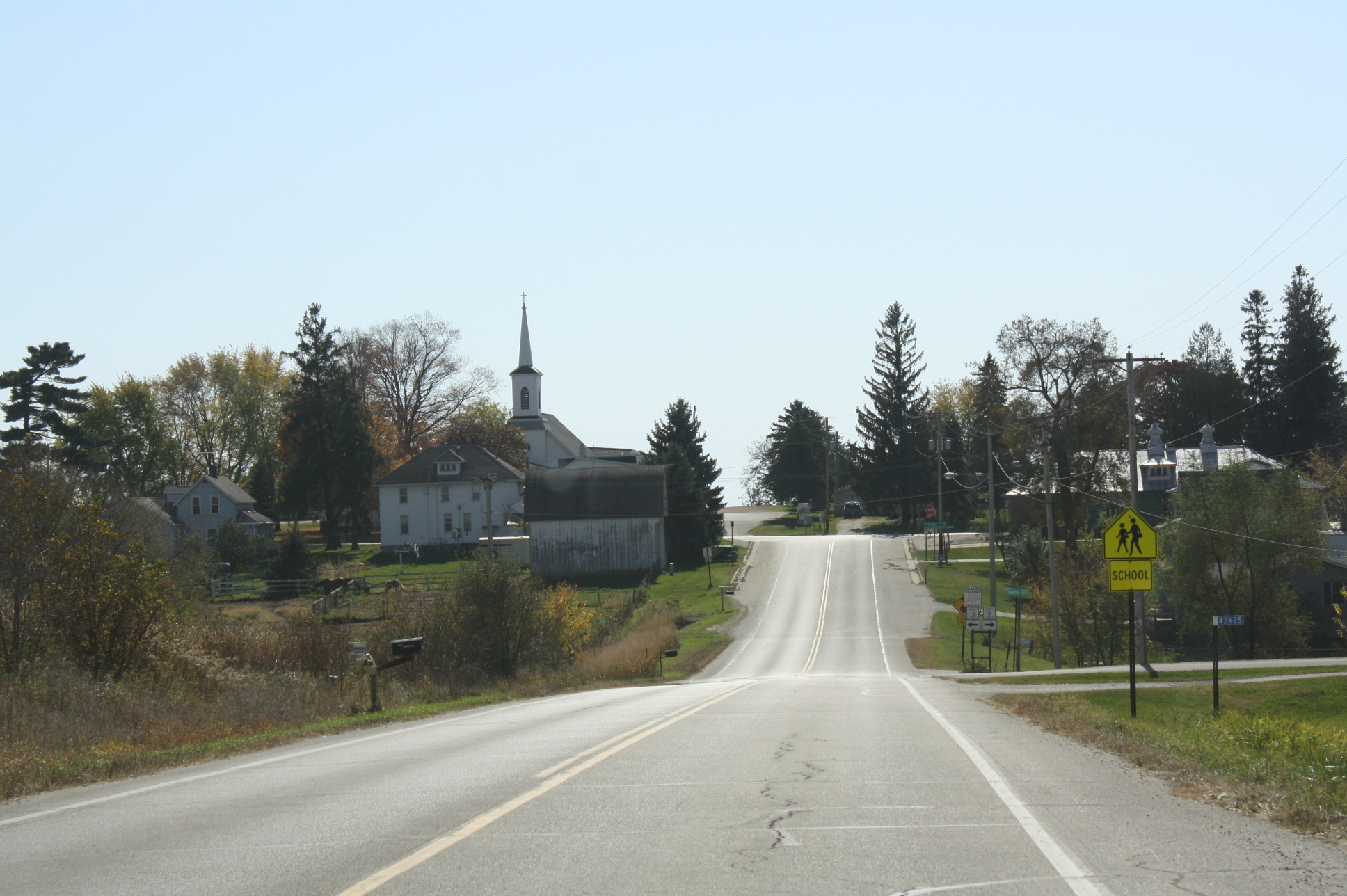
Panorama

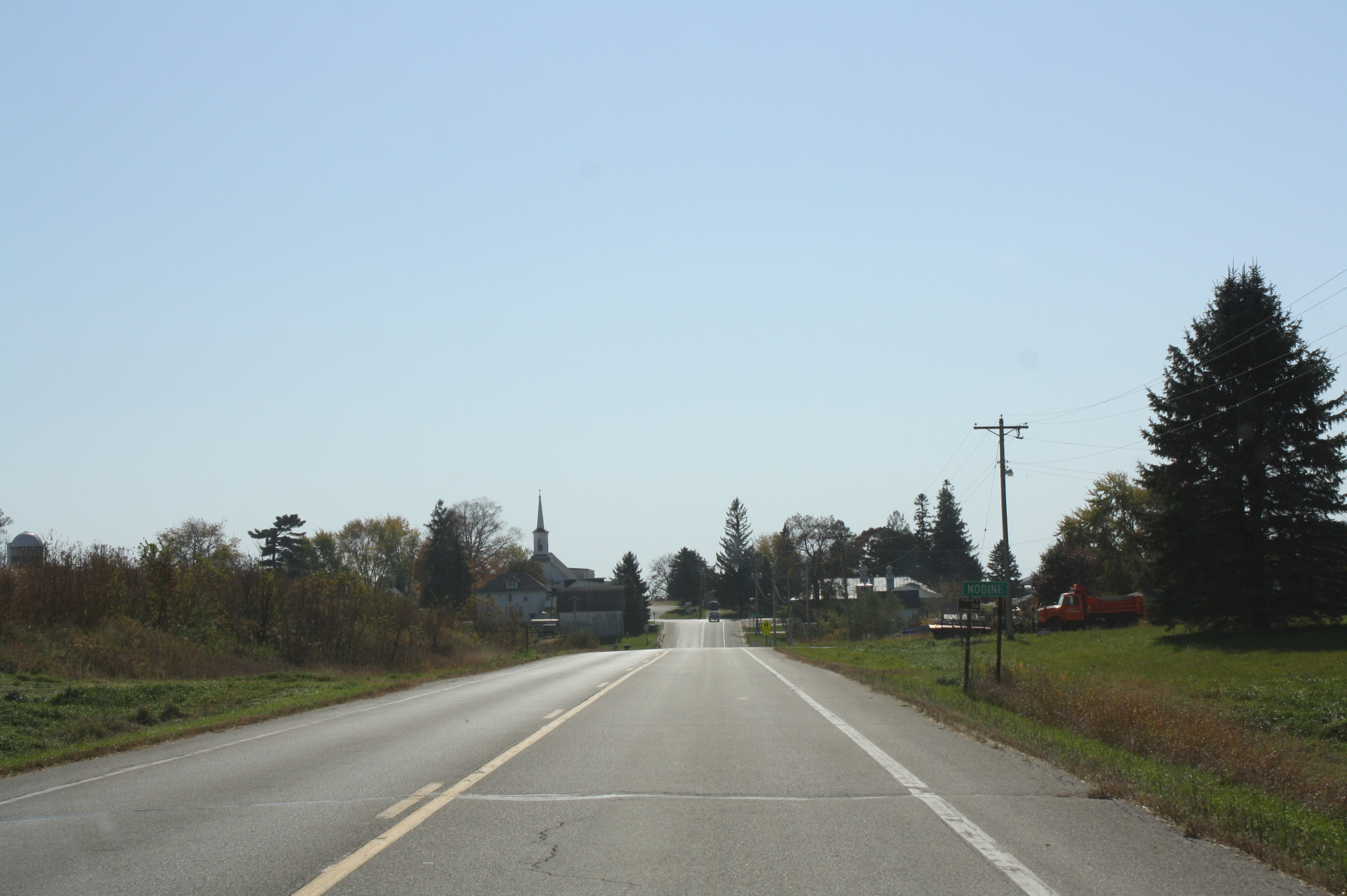
Signpost
