= Rincon (meadow) =

Grass meadow

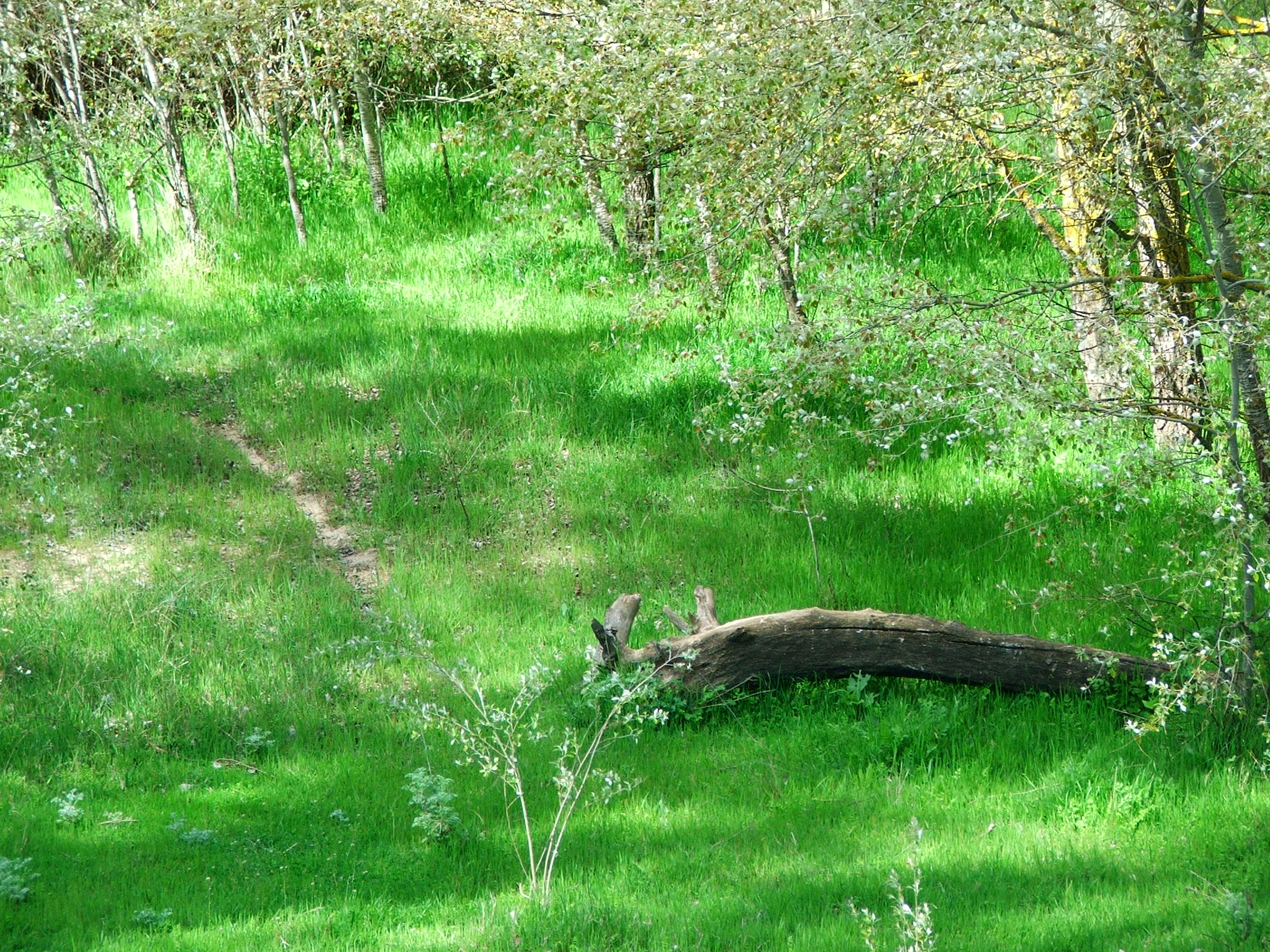
Small meadow, called a rincón by the photographer

A rincón is a grass meadow. The term is in wide use in English in the southwest United States, where it refers specifically to a sloping (usually steep) meadow on the south facing upper slopes of a forested mountain. These characteristic high meadows are formed by the repeated freezing and thawing of snow accumulations on south facing slopes, creating a habitat not conducive to forest. They are further maintained by a high frequency of low-intensity wildfire. A notable example of a wildfire begun in a rincon, with catastrophic consequences, was the 2000 Cerro Grande Fire in New Mexico, United States.

== See also ==
- Goat prairie
- Potrero
