= Goat prairie =

Type of grassland

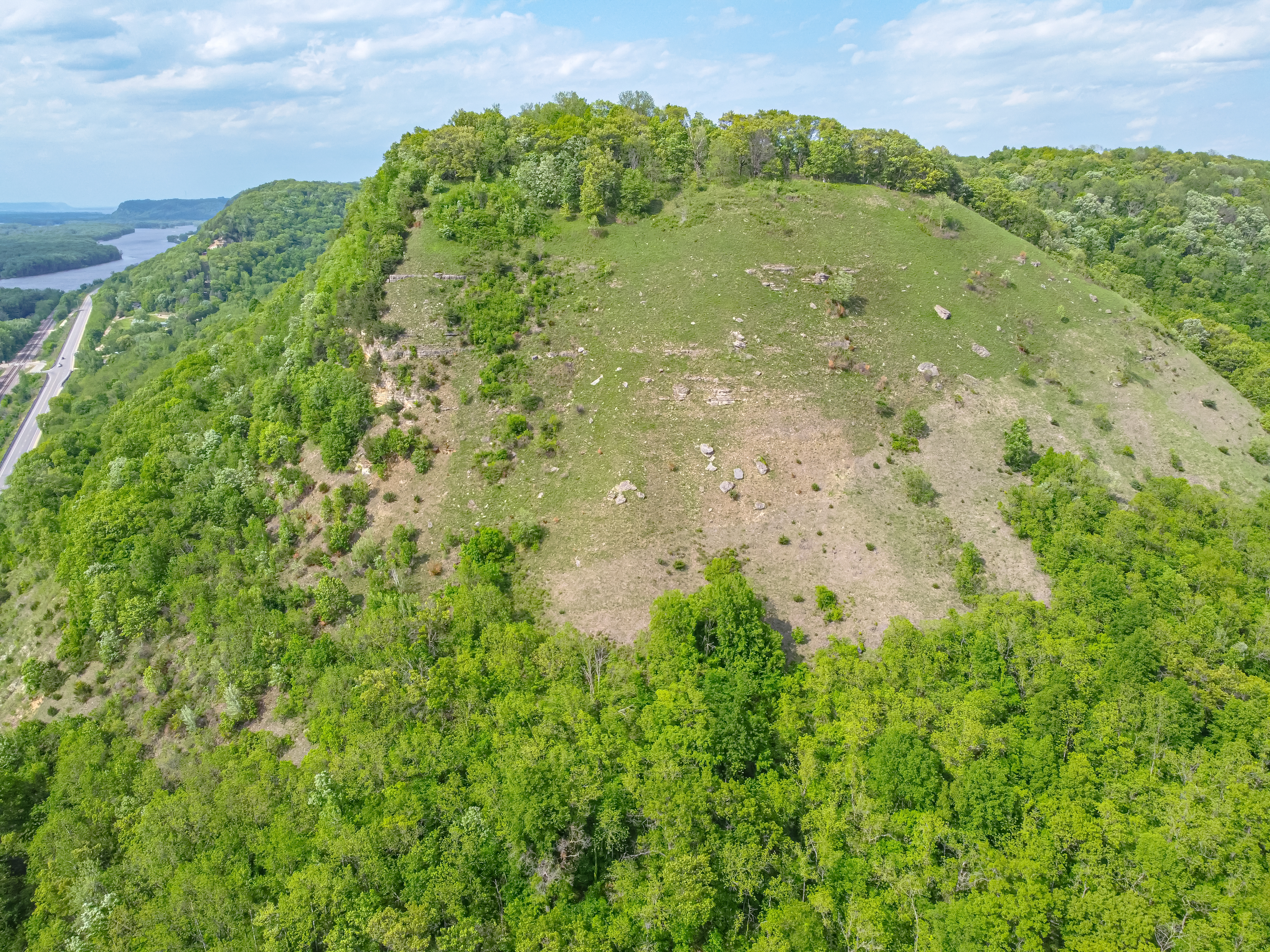
Goat prairie in Wisconsin along the Mississippi River

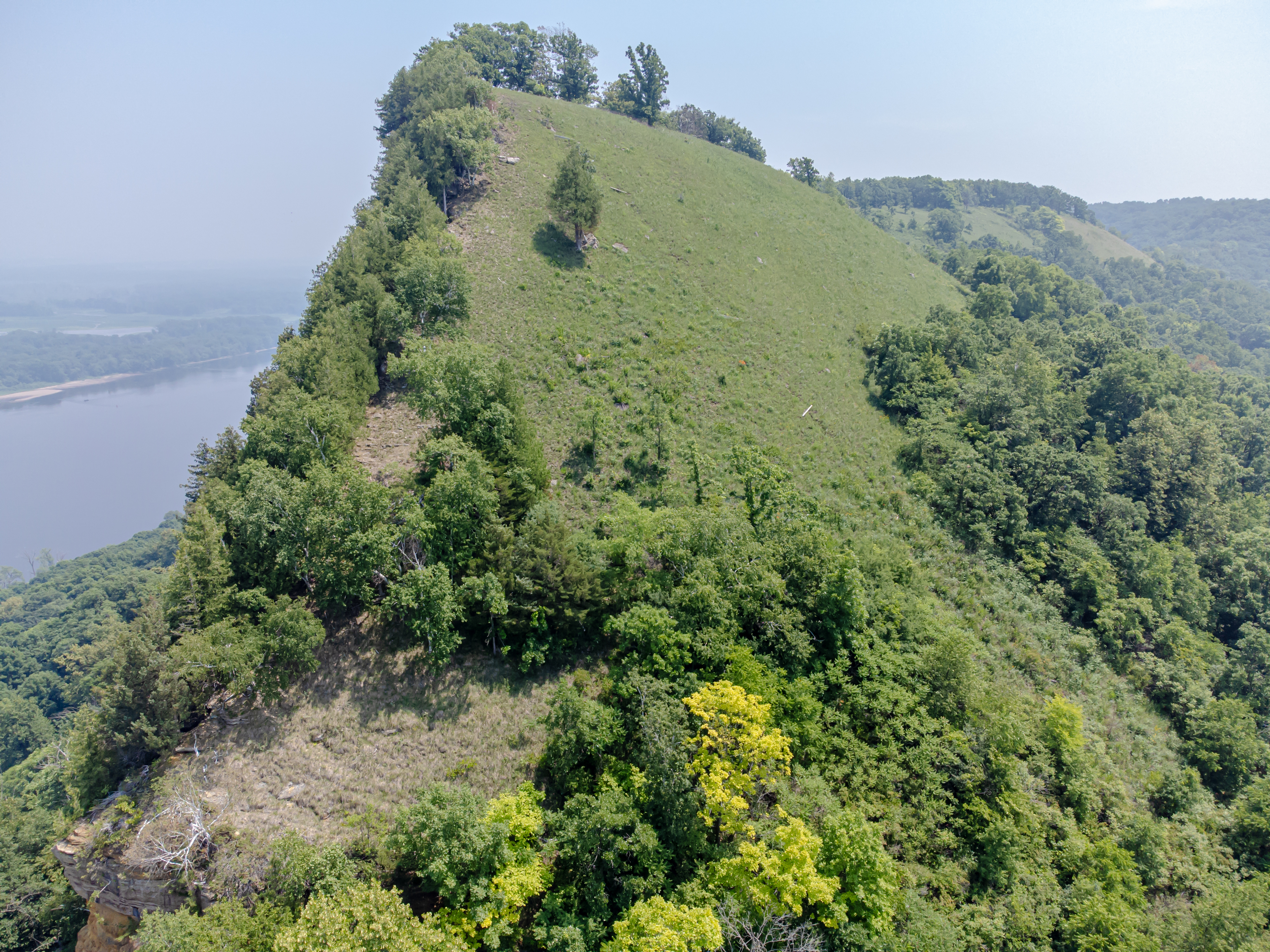
Queens bluff

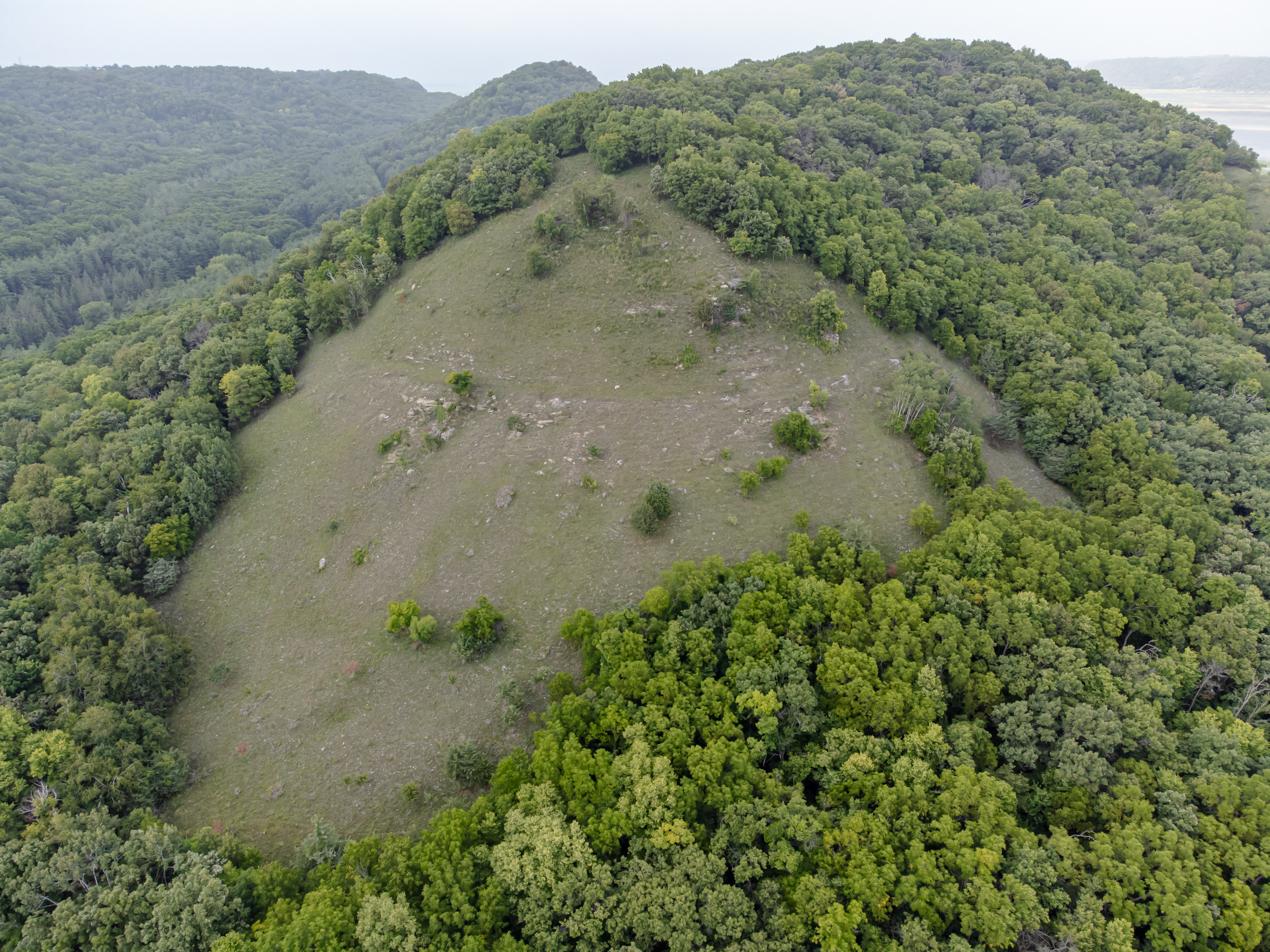
Goats prairie in Reno, Minnesota

Goat prairies, sometimes termed hill prairies, or dry prairies are found mainly along the valley of the Upper Mississippi River in the Driftless Area, but can occur elsewhere. Normally a variant of tallgrass prairie, they are found on south-southwest-facing slopes, which receive considerable winter sun, causing a frequent freeze-thaw cycle. Bedrock generally lies not too far below. Left to themselves, they are subject to natural fire which rejuvenates the ecosystem.

Open grasslands along this stretch of the Mississippi are rapidly colonized by mixed forests. However, the low moisture content of the slopes, the winter freeze-thaw cycle, and the thin layer of soil help to keep goat prairies free of trees. Human suppression of natural fire has greatly reduced their numbers. For publicly owned goat prairies, fire has been carefully set and contained. Eastern Red-cedar tend to be the invading species of tree.

== See also ==
- rincon

== Sources ==
- "Prairie grasslands description", Minnesota Department of Natural Resources, Retrieved July 23, 2007
- "Community and Landform Descriptions", The Nature Conservancy in Iowa, Retrieved July 23, 2007
