= Dresbach Township, Winona County, Minnesota =

Dresbach Township, Minnesota
- Township
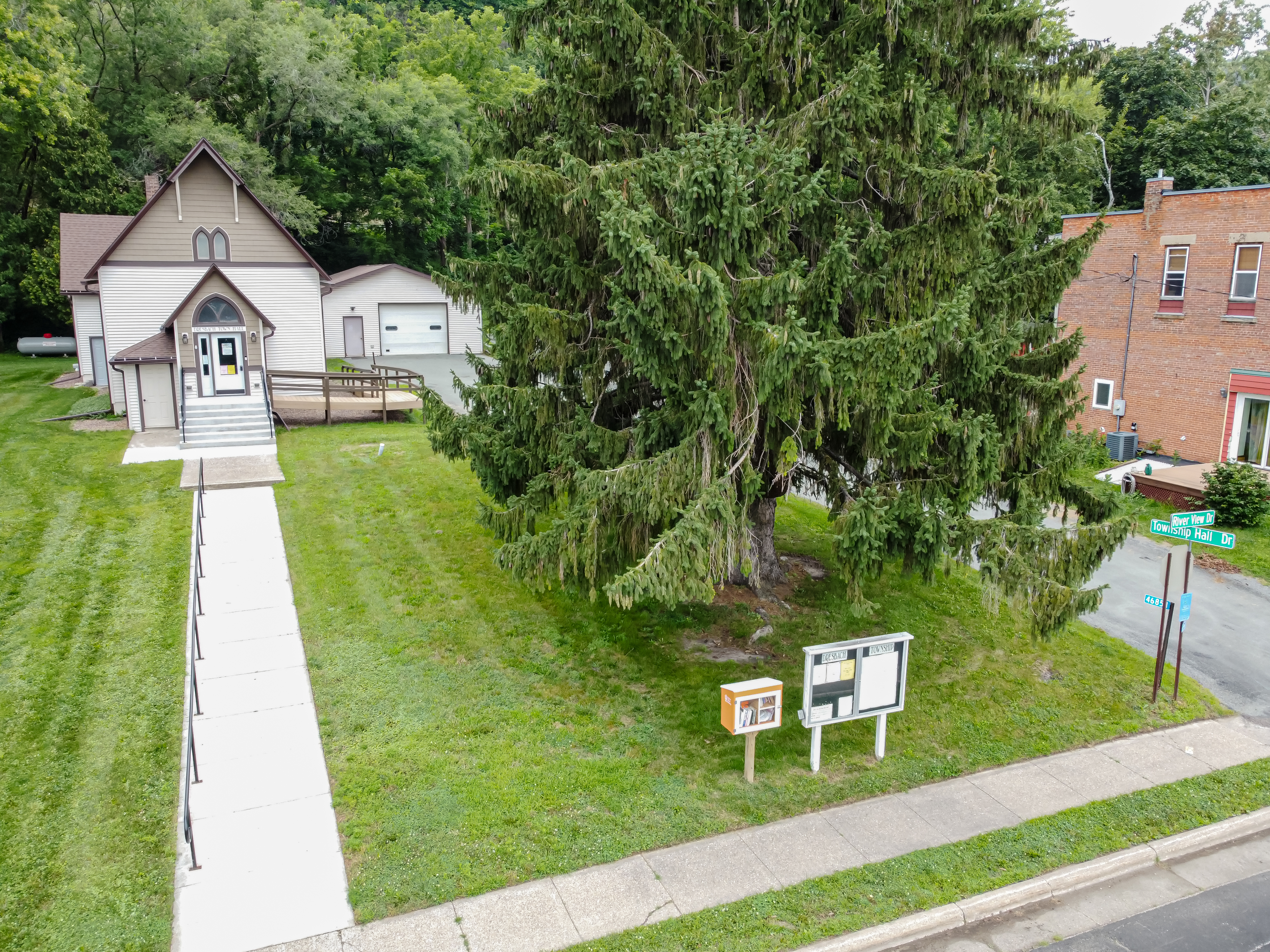
- Town hall in Dresbach

- Location within the state of Minnesota Dresbach Township, Minnesota (the United States)
- Coordinates: 43°52′35″N 91°19′54″W
- Country: United States
- State: Minnesota
- County: Winona

Area
  - Total: 9.3 sq mi (24.0 km^{2})
  - Land: 8.0 sq mi (20.6 km^{2})
  - Water: 1.3 sq mi (3.4 km^{2})
- Elevation: 801 ft (244 m)

Population (2010)
  - Total: 456
  - Density: 57.3/sq mi (22.1/km^{2})
- Time zone: UTC-6 (Central (CST))
  - Summer (DST): UTC-5 (CDT)
- FIPS code: 27-16408
- GNIS feature ID: 0664001
- Website: https://dresbachmn.org/

Dresbach Township is a township in Winona County, Minnesota, United States. The population was 456 at the 2010 census.

== Geography ==
According to the United States Census Bureau, the township has a total area of 9.3 square miles (24 km^{2}); 8.0 square miles (21 km^{2}) is land and 1.3 square miles (3.4 km^{2}), or 14.02%, is water.

=== Community of Dresbach ===
In section 18, an unincorporated community of the same name Dresbach exists. Both the community and township were named after George B. Dresbach, who founded the community and was a representative in the state legislature. The post office was established in 1858 as Dresbach City, then changed to Sherwood in 1864, then back to Dresbach in 1866. The town once had a station on the Chicago, Milwaukee, St. Paul and Pacific Railroad, a sawmill, and several brickyards, lead mines, and limestone and sandstone quarries.

The community of Dresbach today has several businesses near Interstate 90, including the Dresbach travel information center and Lock and Dam No. 7 on the Mississippi River.

== Demographics ==
As of the census of 2000, there were 413 people, 156 households, and 117 families residing in the township. The population density was 51.8 inhabitants per square mile (20.0/km^{2}). There were 175 housing units at an average density of 22.0 per square mile (8.5/km^{2}). The racial makeup of the township was 99.27% White, 0.24% Asian, and 0.48% from two or more races. Hispanic or Latino of any race were 1.21% of the population.

There were 156 households, out of which 32.7% had children under the age of 18 living with them, 68.6% were married couples living together, 5.1% had a female householder with no husband present, and 24.4% were non-families. 19.9% of all households were made up of individuals, and 8.3% had someone living alone who was 65 years of age or older. The average household size was 2.48 and the average family size was 2.87.

In the township the population was spread out, with 21.8% under the age of 18, 5.8% from 18 to 24, 25.2% from 25 to 44, 35.4% from 45 to 64, and 11.9% who were 65 years of age or older. The median age was 44 years. For every 100 females, there were 115.1 males. For every 100 females age 18 and over, there were 121.2 males.

The median income for a household in the township was $47,813, and the median income for a family was $58,750. Males had a median income of $39,500 versus $26,607 for females. The per capita income for the township was $25,648. About 7.0% of families and 8.6% of the population were below the poverty line, including 9.1% of those under age 18 and 4.3% of those age 65 or over.
