= Pickwick Mill =

- U.S. National Register of Historic Places
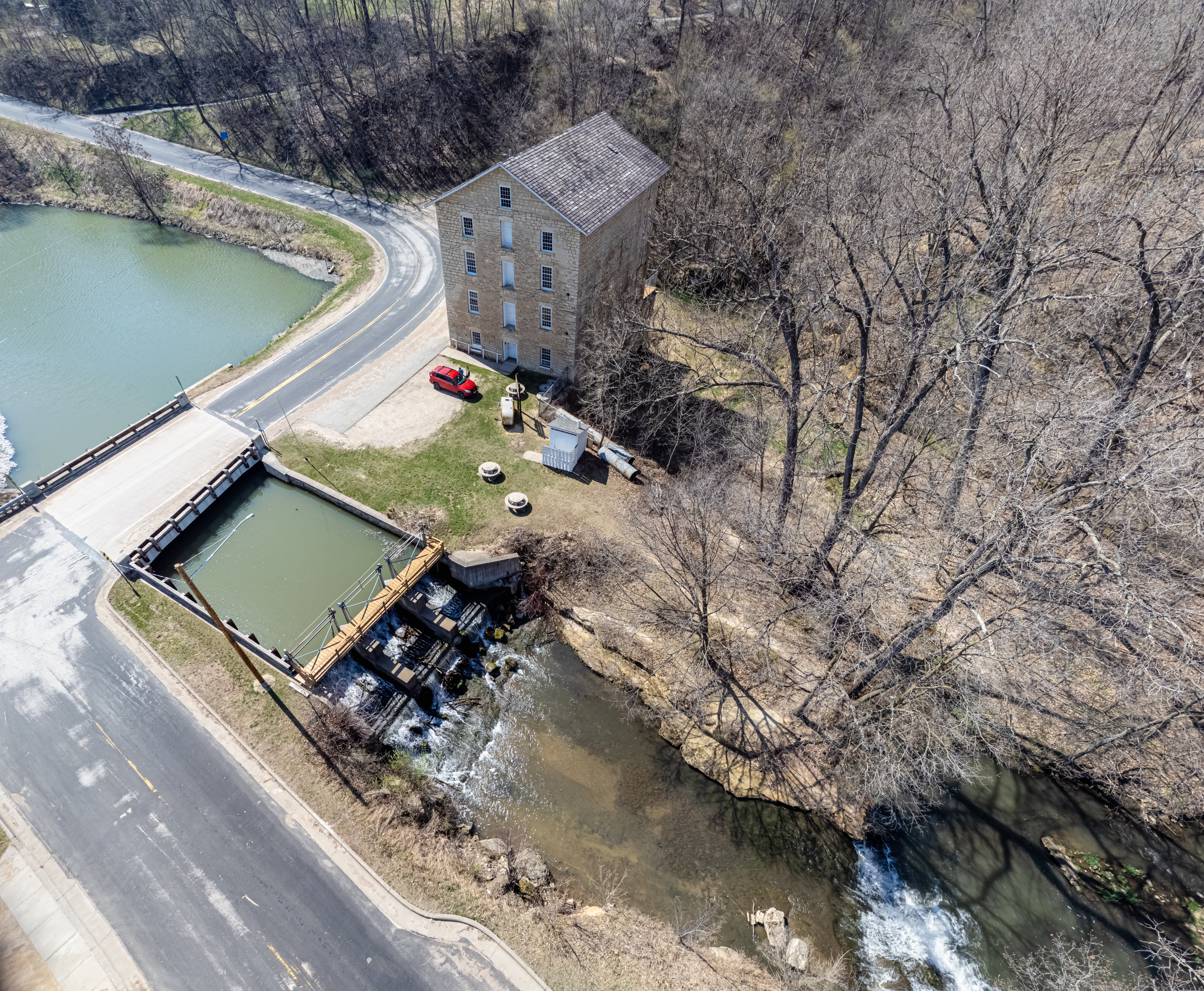

- Location within Minnesota Location within the United States
- Location: 24813 County Road 7, Pickwick, Minnesota
- Coordinates: 43°58′49.4″N 91°29′48.2″W
- Area: 1 acre (0.40 ha)
- Built: 1854
- NRHP reference No.: 70000314
- Added to NRHP: September 22, 1970

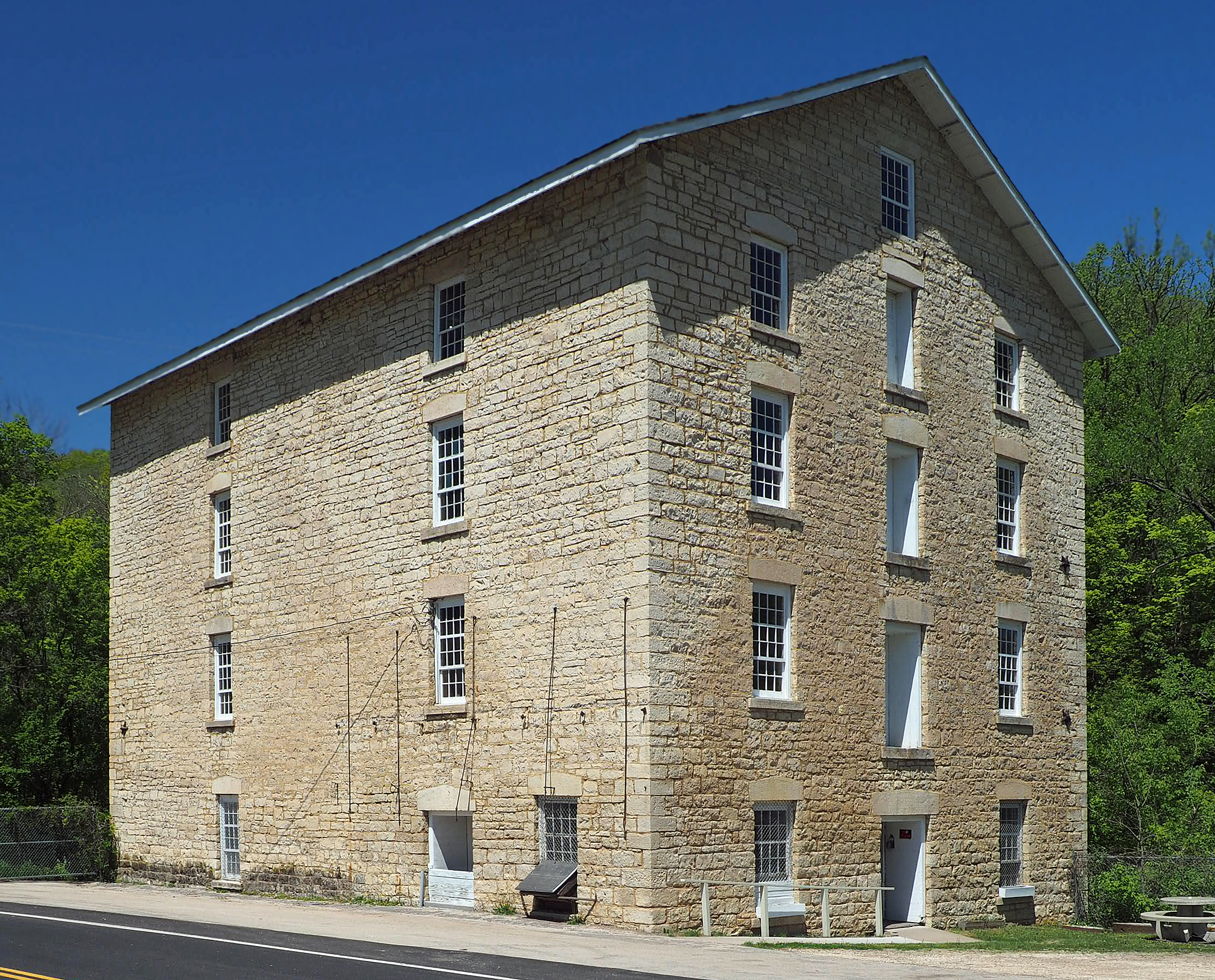

Pickwick Mill is a historic gristmill in the unincorporated community of Pickwick, Minnesota, United States, near the city of Winona. It was constructed in the mid-1850s and is now operated as a milling museum. Pickwick Mill was listed on the National Register of Historic Places in 1970 for having state-level significance in the themes of agriculture, architecture, and industry. It was nominated for being one of southeast Minnesota's oldest surviving water-powered mills, serving as a key local industry in its day and a Winona County landmark to the present.

== Description ==
The six-story building was constructed from local limestone with a nail-less timber frame and a pitched roof. In 1907 a tornado ripped up the roof and top story, which the operators replaced with a flat plank roof. A more classically accurate pitched roof was restored in recent years. The mill is powered by a 20-foot (6 m) water wheel. Most of the mill's original machinery is still intact and operable.

== History ==
Pickwick Mill was built on the banks of Big Trout Creek by Thomas Grant and Wilson Davis. The mill's official website says it was constructed 1856–58, though other sources give a construction date of 1854. The property's National Register nomination says it was built in 1854 as a grist- and lumber mill and converted to flour production in 1856.

Pickwick Mill is one of the largest mills in Minnesota and was one of the first community businesses in the state. During the American Civil War the mill ran non-stop, churning out 100 barrels of flour a day for the Union Army.

== Historic attraction ==
Pickwick Mill is now managed by Pickwick Mill Inc., a non-profit organization largely funded by grants. It is open for tours from May to October.

== See also ==
- List of museums in Minnesota
- List of watermills in the United States
- National Register of Historic Places listings in Winona County, Minnesota
