= Dresbach Formation =

Geologic formation in Wisconsin

- Stratigraphic range: Cambrian
- Type: Formation

Location
- Region: Wisconsin, Minnesota
- Country: United States

The Dresbach Formation is a geologic formation in Wisconsin and Minnesota. It preserves fossils dating back to the Cambrian period.

== See also ==
- List of fossiliferous stratigraphic units in Wisconsin
- Paleontology in Wisconsin
