= Dresbach–Hunt–Boyer House =

Historic house in California, United States

- U.S. National Register of Historic Places
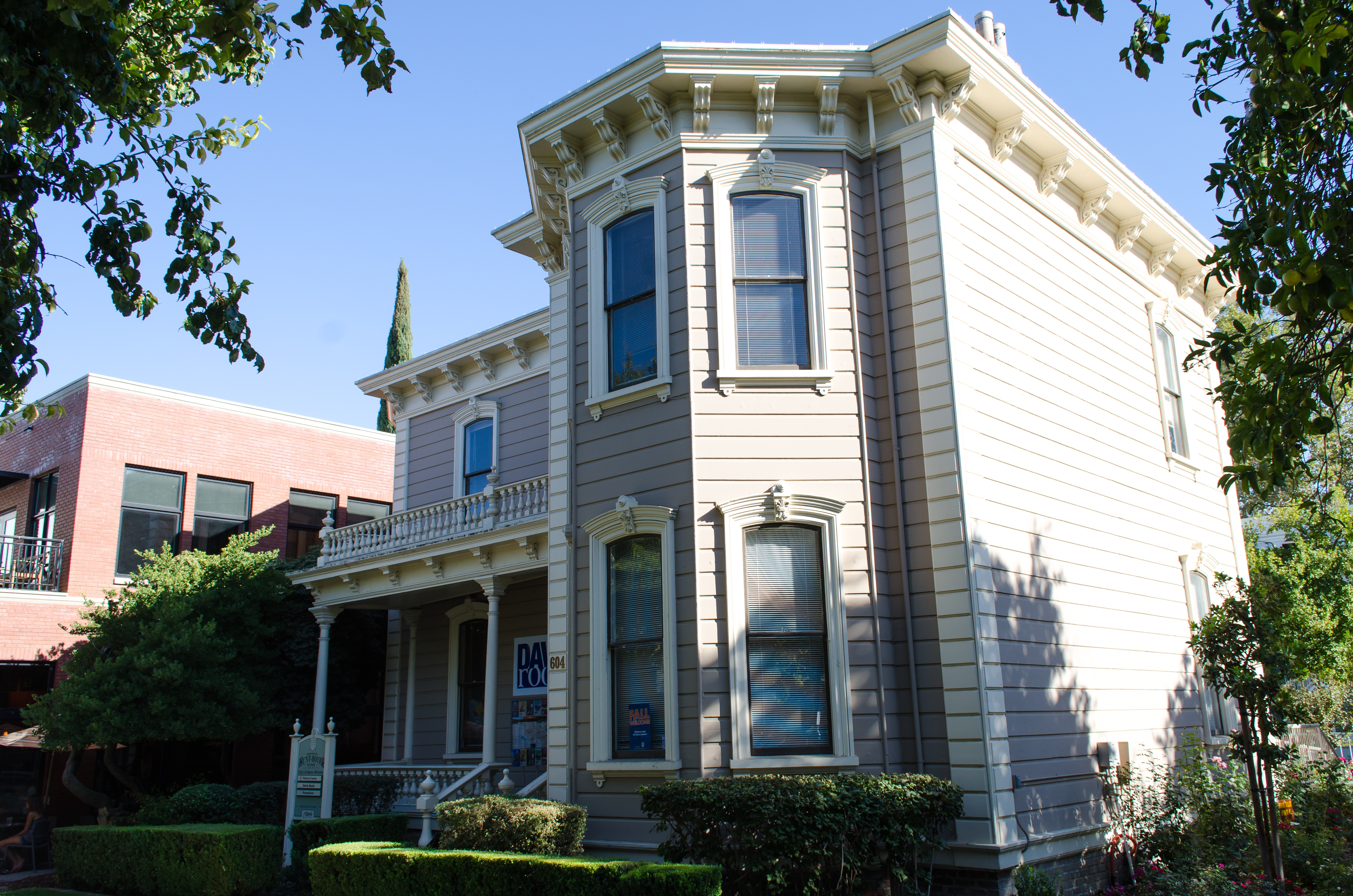

- Location within California Location within the United States
- Location: 604 2nd Street, Davis, California
- Coordinates: 38°32′36″N 121°44′22″W
- Area: 0.6 acres (0.24 ha)
- Built: early 1870s
- Architectural style: Stick Italianate
- NRHP reference No.: 76000540
- Added to NRHP: September 13, 1976

The Dresbach–Hunt–Boyer House is a historic house located at 604 2nd Street in Davis, California. Built in the early 1870s, the house is the only extant example of a Stick style Italianate house in Davis. The house's design features wood siding, a cornice with decorative brackets, a front porch topped by a balustrade, and a three-sided bay on the right side of the front facade. William Dresbach, the home's first owner, was a wealthy local merchant who served as Davis' first postmaster. Dresbach lost the house to bankruptcy in 1879, and the house passed through two owners before Frank Hunt purchased it in 1899. Hunt's brother John moved into the home in 1902; after 1920, his daughter Mary Boyer owned the home until her death in 1973.

The house was added to the National Register of Historic Places on September 13, 1976.
