= Willard Bunnell House =

Historic house in Minnesota, United States

- U.S. National Register of Historic Places
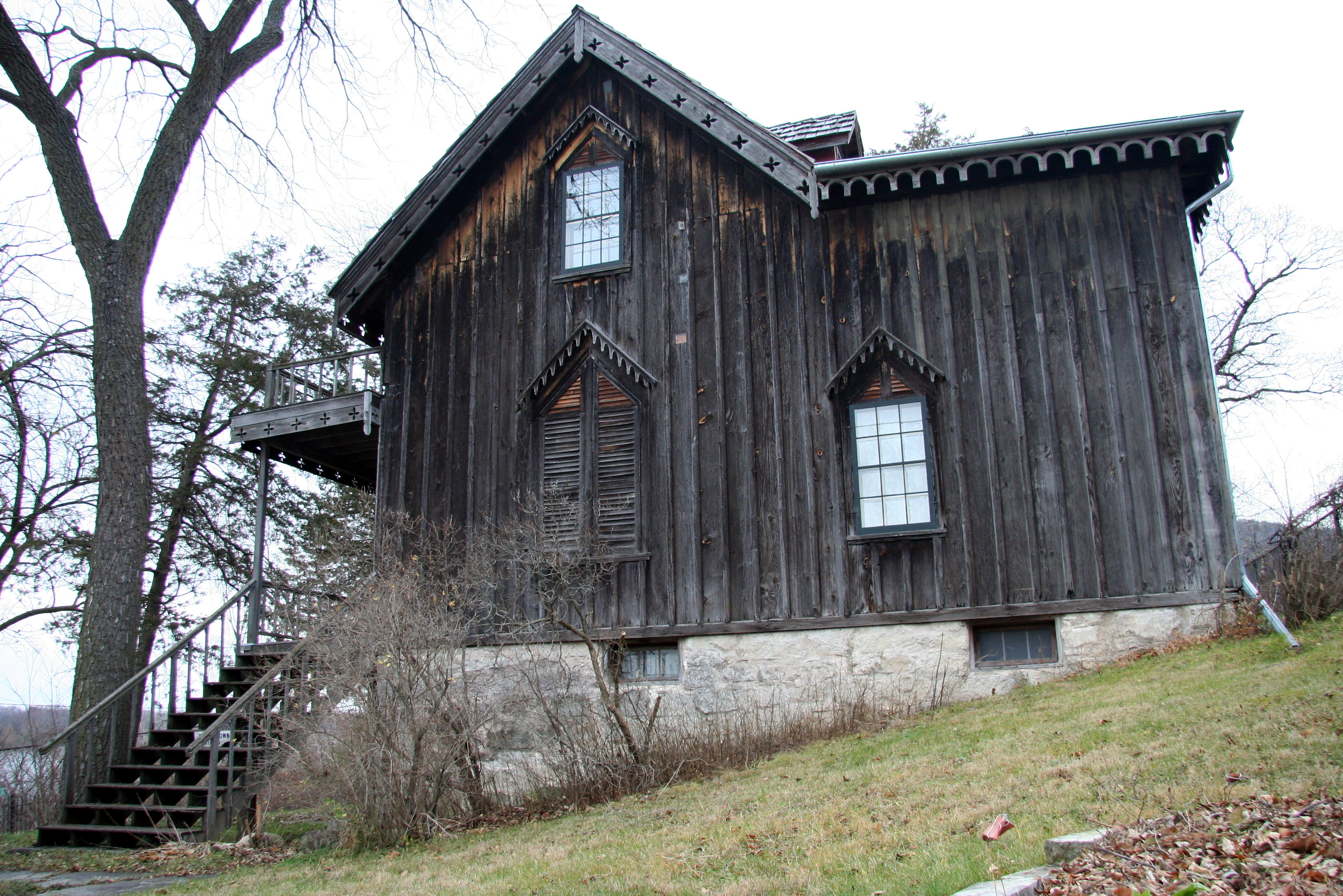
- The Willard Bunnell House from the west

- Location within Minnesota Location within the United States
- Location: 36106 Old Homer Road, Homer, Minnesota
- Coordinates: 44°1′20.3″N 91°33′34.7″W
- Area: 1 acre (0.40 ha)
- Built: c. 1850s
- Architect: Willard Bunnell
- Architectural style: Carpenter Gothic
- NRHP reference No.: 73000998
- Added to NRHP: April 23, 1973

The Willard Bunnell House is a historic house museum in Homer, Minnesota, United States. The house was listed on the National Register of Historic Places in 1973 for having state-level significance in the themes of architecture, commerce, and exploration/settlement. It was nominated for being Minnesota's first permanent house south of Saint Paul, as well as for its Gothic Revival architecture and association with brothers Willard (1814–1861) and Lafayette Bunnell (1824–1903), who helped develop the area during its frontier days. It is now managed by the Winona County Historical Society.

== Description ==
The Willard Bunnell House is located three miles (4.8 km) east of Winona, Minnesota, overlooking U.S. Route 61 and the Mississippi River. It is a simple board-and-batten structure of unpainted eastern white pine. It is in the Carpenter Gothic style, with triangle-peaked windows and shutters, and carved bargeboards. However the house also has unusual features more typical of architecture in the Ohio and Lower Mississippi River Valleys, such as a two-story veranda and a flat-roofed rear wing.

== History ==
Willard Bunnell was born in 1814 and rose from cabin boy to captain in the Great Lakes steamboat trade. He married Matilda Desnoyer in 1837 in Detroit, and became involved in efforts to open up the American frontier. He helped survey a military road from Detroit to Mackinaw, then began trading with the Ojibwe people around the Escanaba River.

In 1841 Willard and Matilda Bunnell, along with his younger brother Lafayette, traveled to the Upper Mississippi River, ultimately settling in Trempealeau, Wisconsin. From 1845 to 1846 Lafayette Bunnell was involved in logging and timber rafting on the Chippewa River, a short-lived effort that nevertheless presaged what would become the founding industry of the region. The brothers also helped build the first sawmill on the Eau Claire River, which would give rise to the city of Eau Claire, Wisconsin.

In the late 1840s Lafayette returned east and entered military service, while Willard remained on the Upper Mississippi. The land across the river was still the territory of the Dakota people and was closed to Euro-American settlement, but Willard anticipated a change and gained permission from Chief Wabasha III to build a log cabin on the west bank of the Mississippi.

In 1852, following the Treaty of Traverse des Sioux, much of Minnesota Territory opened to white settlement. Over the next few years Willard Bunnell helped found three new towns—Minneowah, Chatfield, and Homer—largely out of the expectation that Winona would fail because he judged the site prone to flooding. However floods did not trouble Winona and the community prospered, while Bunnell's alternatives remained small.

Sometime during this period Williard also built a new, grander home beside his and Matilda's original log cabin—the house that is still standing today. The house may have been unfinished when Willard died in 1861. His brother Lafayette, having served as a surgeon in the Mexican–American War, the Mariposa War, and the Civil War, and been involved in the first Euro-American exploration of the Yosemite Valley, took up residence in the house in 1865 and lived there until his own death in 1903.

== See also ==
- List of museums in Minnesota
- National Register of Historic Places listings in Winona County, Minnesota
