= New Hartford Township, Winona County, Minnesota =

New Hartford Township, Minnesota
- Township
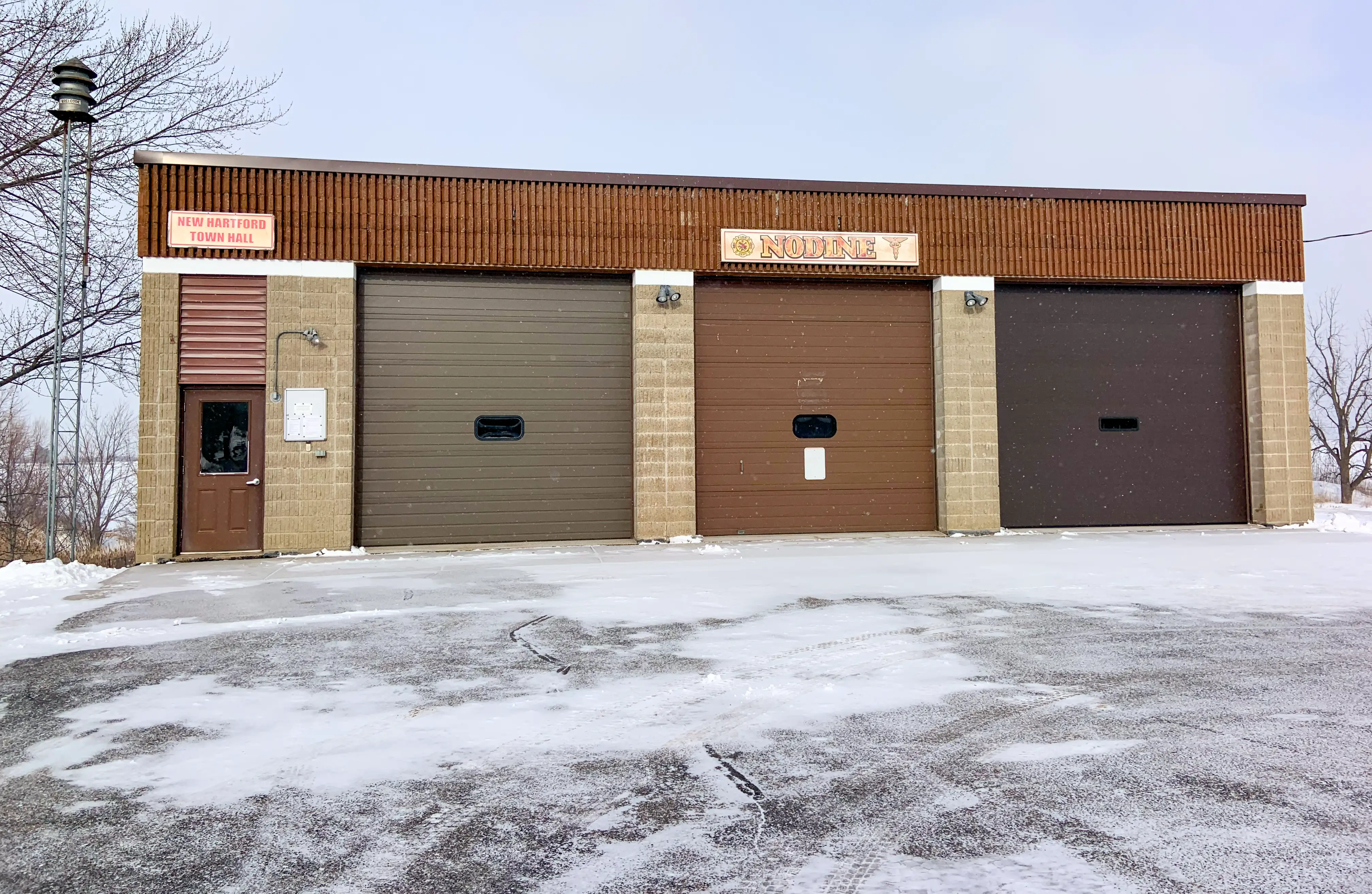
- New Hartford Town Hall in Nodine, Minnesota

- Location within the state of Minnesota New Hartford Township, Minnesota (the United States)
- Coordinates: 43°53′9″N 91°24′59″W
- Country: United States
- State: Minnesota
- County: Winona

Area
  - Total: 35.2 sq mi (91.1 km^{2})
  - Land: 35.1 sq mi (90.9 km^{2})
  - Water: 0.077 sq mi (0.2 km^{2})
- Elevation: 1,299 ft (396 m)

Population (2010)
  - Total: 890
  - Density: 25/sq mi (9.8/km^{2})
- Time zone: Central (CST)
  - Summer (DST): UTC-5
- ZIP code: 55925
- Area code: 507
- FIPS code: 27-45592
- GNIS feature ID: 0665096
- Website: https://townshipnewhartford.org/

New Hartford Township is a township in Winona County, Minnesota, United States. The population was 890 at the 2010 census. Its town hall is located in the unincorporated community of Nodine.

== History ==
New Hartford Township was organized in 1858, and named after Hartford, Connecticut, the former home of a share of the early settlers.

== Geography ==
According to the United States Census Bureau, the township has a total area of 35.2 square miles (91 km^{2}); 35.1 square miles (91 km^{2}) is land and 0.1 square miles (0.26 km^{2}), or 0.20%, is water.

== Demographics ==
As of the census of 2000, there were 820 people, 278 households, and 232 families residing in the township. The population density was 23.4 people per square mile (9.0/km^{2}). There were 298 housing units at an average density of 8.5/sq mi (3.3/km^{2}). The racial makeup of the township was 97.93% White, 0.12% African American, 1.34% from other races, and 0.61% from two or more races. Hispanic or Latino of any race were 1.46% of the population.

There were 278 households, out of which 41.4% had children under the age of 18 living with them, 74.5% were married couples living together, 3.6% had a female householder with no husband present, and 16.2% were non-families. 11.9% of all households were made up of individuals, and 2.5% had someone living alone who was 65 years of age or older. The average household size was 2.95 and the average family size was 3.24.

In the township the population was spread out, with 30.1% under the age of 18, 8.8% from 18 to 24, 27.9% from 25 to 44, 22.3% from 45 to 64, and 10.9% who were 65 years of age or older. The median age was 36 years. For every 100 females, there were 121.6 males. For every 100 females age 18 and over, there were 118.7 males.

The median income for a household in the township was $45,938, and the median income for a family was $48,750. Males had a median income of $32,059 versus $24,000 for females. The per capita income for the township was $18,738. About 6.4% of families and 7.6% of the population were below the poverty line, including 9.9% of those under age 18 and 8.1% of those age 65 or over.
