= George B. Dresbach =

American politician (1827–1887)

George Betz Dresbach

Member of the Minnesota House of Representatives
- In office 1868–1868
- In office 1878–1878

Personal details
- Born: August 27, 1827 Saltcreek, Pickaway County, Ohio, U.S.
- Died: April 11, 1887 (aged 59) Minnesota, U.S.
- Party: Democratic
- Spouse: Mary Casey Nichols
- Children: George Betz Dresbach Jr.
- Occupation: Politician, farmer
- Known for: Founder of Dresbach, Minnesota

George Betz Dresbach (August 27, 1827 – April 11, 1887) was an American politician from Minnesota.

Born in Pickaway County, Ohio, Dresbach served in the Minnesota House of Representatives in 1868 and 1878 as a Democrat. He founded the unincorporated community of Dresbach, Minnesota and was a farmer.

== Early life ==
George Betz Dresbach was born in Saltcreek in Pickaway County to George Dresbach and his wife Catherine Betz. He was the seventh child and third son (of those who lived to adulthood). He was born on August 18, 1827.

At the age of 20, he attended the Greenfield Academy. He moved to Wisconsin in the year 1855 where it is believed he met and married Mary Casey Nichols. Their first son, George Betz Jr was born there on April 27, 1857.

Shortly after he removed to Minnesota and in 1858 established the township of Dresbach under the Minnesota Township Authorization Act.
