= Richmond Township, Winona County, Minnesota =

Richmond Township, Minnesota
- Township
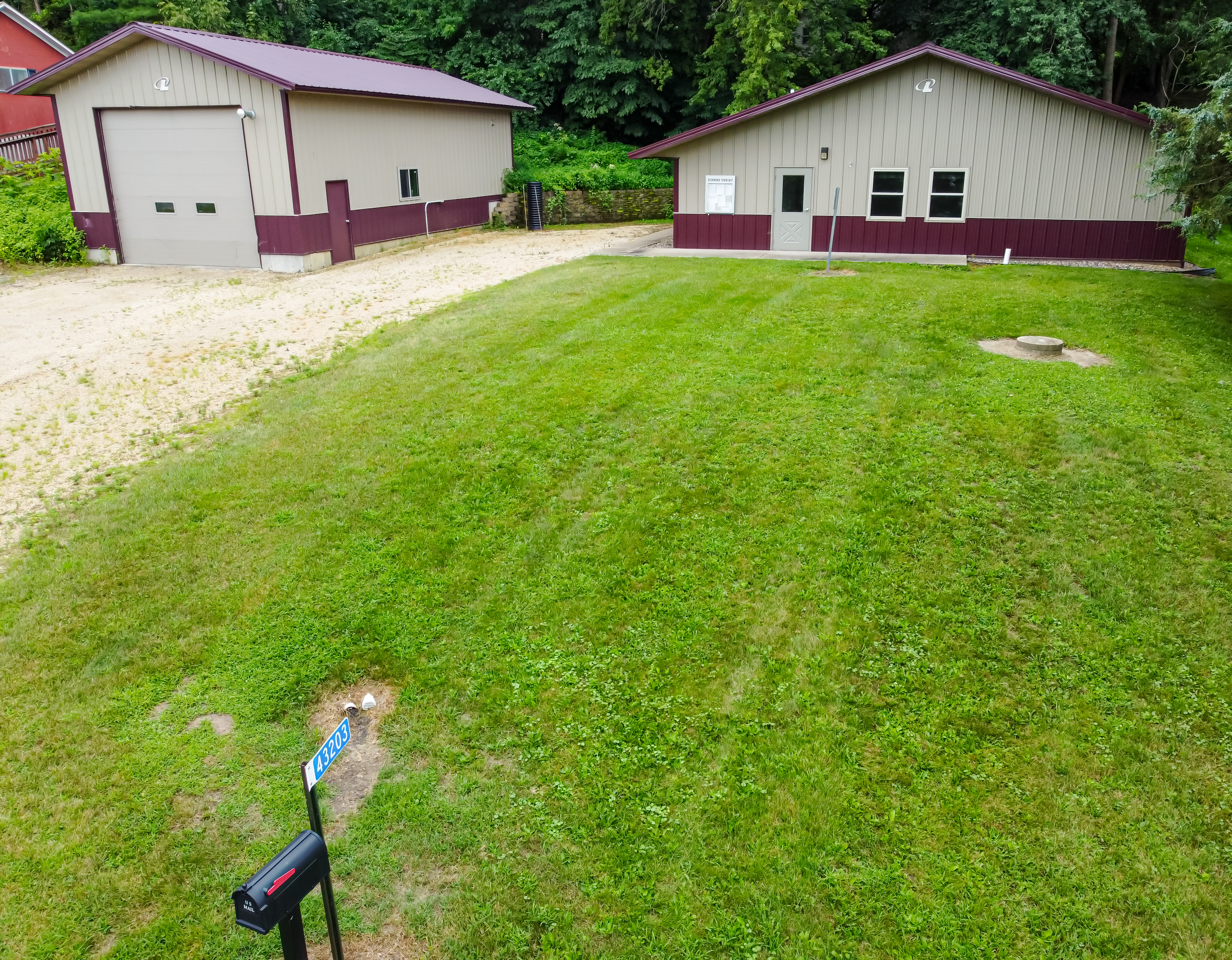
- Town hall at 43203 Bell Dr in Winona County

- Location within the state of Minnesota Richmond Township, Minnesota (the United States)
- Coordinates: 43°58′44″N 91°25′44″W
- Country: United States
- State: Minnesota
- County: Winona

Area
  - Total: 18.6 sq mi (48.3 km^{2})
  - Land: 16.2 sq mi (42.0 km^{2})
  - Water: 2.4 sq mi (6.3 km^{2})
- Elevation: 741 ft (226 m)

Population (2010)
  - Total: 699
  - Density: 43.1/sq mi (16.6/km^{2})
- Time zone: UTC-6 (Central (CST))
  - Summer (DST): UTC-5 (CDT)
- FIPS code: 27-54286
- GNIS feature ID: 0665416

Richmond Township is a township in Winona County, Minnesota, United States. The population was 699 at the 2010 census.

Richmond Township was organized in 1858, and named for a French settler.

== Geography ==
According to the United States Census Bureau, the township has a total area of 18.6 square miles (48 km^{2}); 16.2 square miles (42 km^{2}) is land and 2.4 square miles (6.2 km^{2}), or 13.04%, is water.

== Demographics ==
At the 2000 census, there were 729 people, 278 households and 207 families residing in the township. The population density was 45.0 inhabitants per square mile (17.4/km^{2}). There were 314 housing units at an average density of 21.4/sq mi (7.5/km^{2}). The racial makeup of the township was 98.77% White, 0.41% Asian, 0.27% from other races, and 0.55% from two or more races. Hispanic or Latino of any race were 0.27% of the population.

There were 278 households, of which 36.3% had children under the age of 18 living with them, 68.0% were married couples living together, 3.6% had a female householder with no husband present, and 25.5% were non-families. 19.1% of all households were made up of individuals, and 5.0% had someone living alone who was 65 years of age or older. The average household size was 2.62 and the average family size was 3.05.

26.1% of the population were under the age of 18, 7.0% from 18 to 24, 29.2% from 25 to 44, 28.5% from 45 to 64, and 9.2% who were 65 years of age or older. The median age was 39 years. For every 100 females, there were 98.6 males. For every 100 females age 18 and over, there were 104.2 males.

The median household income was $52,386 and the median family income was $57,596. Males had a median income of $36,094 compared with $24,464 for females. The per capita income was $24,862. About 2.9% of families and 4.4% of the population were below the poverty line, including 4.5% of those under age 18 and 11.1% of those age 65 or over.
