= Dresbach, Minnesota =

Unincorporated community in Minnesota, United States

Dresbach
- Unincorporated community and Census designated place
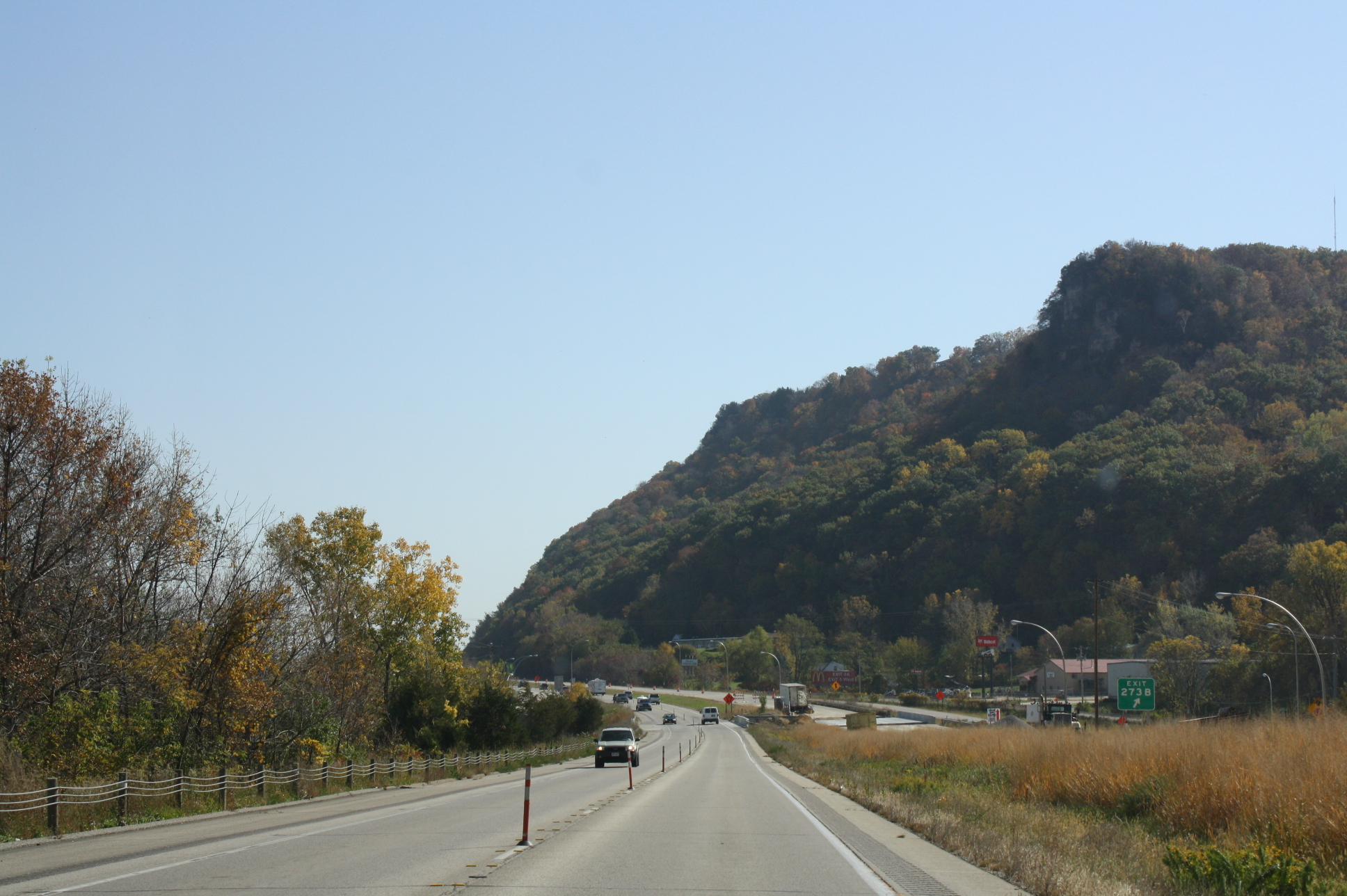
- Dresbach along Interstate 90 looking south

- Location within Minnesota Location within the United States
- Coordinates: 43°53′22″N 91°20′38″W
- Country: United States
- State: Minnesota
- County: Winona County
- Township: Dresbach Township

Area
  - Total: 1.09 sq mi (2.82 km^{2})
  - Land: 0.95 sq mi (2.45 km^{2})
  - Water: 0.15 sq mi (0.38 km^{2})
- Elevation: 866 ft (264 m)

Population (2020)
  - Total: 272
  - Density: 287.8/sq mi (111.12/km^{2})
- Time zone: UTC-6 (Central (CST))
  - Summer (DST): UTC-5 (CDT)
- ZIP code: 55947 and 55925
- Area code: 507
- GNIS feature ID: 2806365

Dresbach (/ˈdʒrɛsbɑːk/ DRESS-bahk) is an unincorporated community in Dresbach Township, Winona County, Minnesota, United States.

As of the 2020 census, Dresbach had a population of 272.

The community is located on the west side of the Mississippi River along Interstate 90 between Winona and La Crosse. U.S. Highways 61 and 14 are briefly co-signed with Interstate 90 at this point.

Dresbach is located along the Mississippi River. Nearby places include Winona, Dakota, Nodine, La Crescent, La Crosse, Onalaska, and Great River Bluffs State Park. Local businesses include the Dresbach travel information center, and Lock and Dam No. 7 on the Mississippi River.

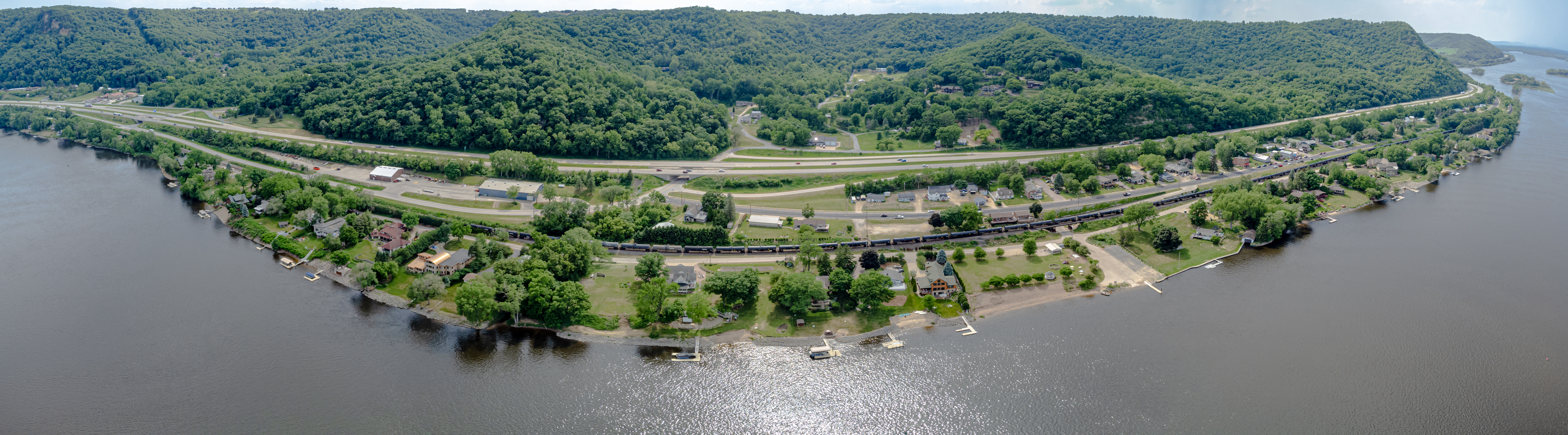
Dresbach, Minnesota

== History ==
Both the community and township were named after George B. Dresbach, who founded the community and was a representative in the state legislature. The post office was established in 1858 as Dresbach City, then changed to Sherwood in 1864, then back to Dresbach in 1866. The community once had a station on the former Chicago, Milwaukee and St. Paul Railroad, a sawmill, and several brickyards, lead mines, and limestone and sandstone quarries.

Historical population
Census	Pop.	Note	%±
1880	185		—
1900	285		—
1910	174		−38.9%
1920	176		1.1%
2020	272		—
U.S. Decennial Census

== Transportation ==
Amtrak’s Empire Builder (which operates between Seattle/Portland and Chicago) and Borealis (which operates between Saint Paul and Chicago) pass through the town on CPKC tracks, but make no stop. The nearest station is located in La Crosse, 8 miles (13 km) to the southeast.
