= Dakota, Minnesota =

City in Minnesota, United States

Dakota
- City
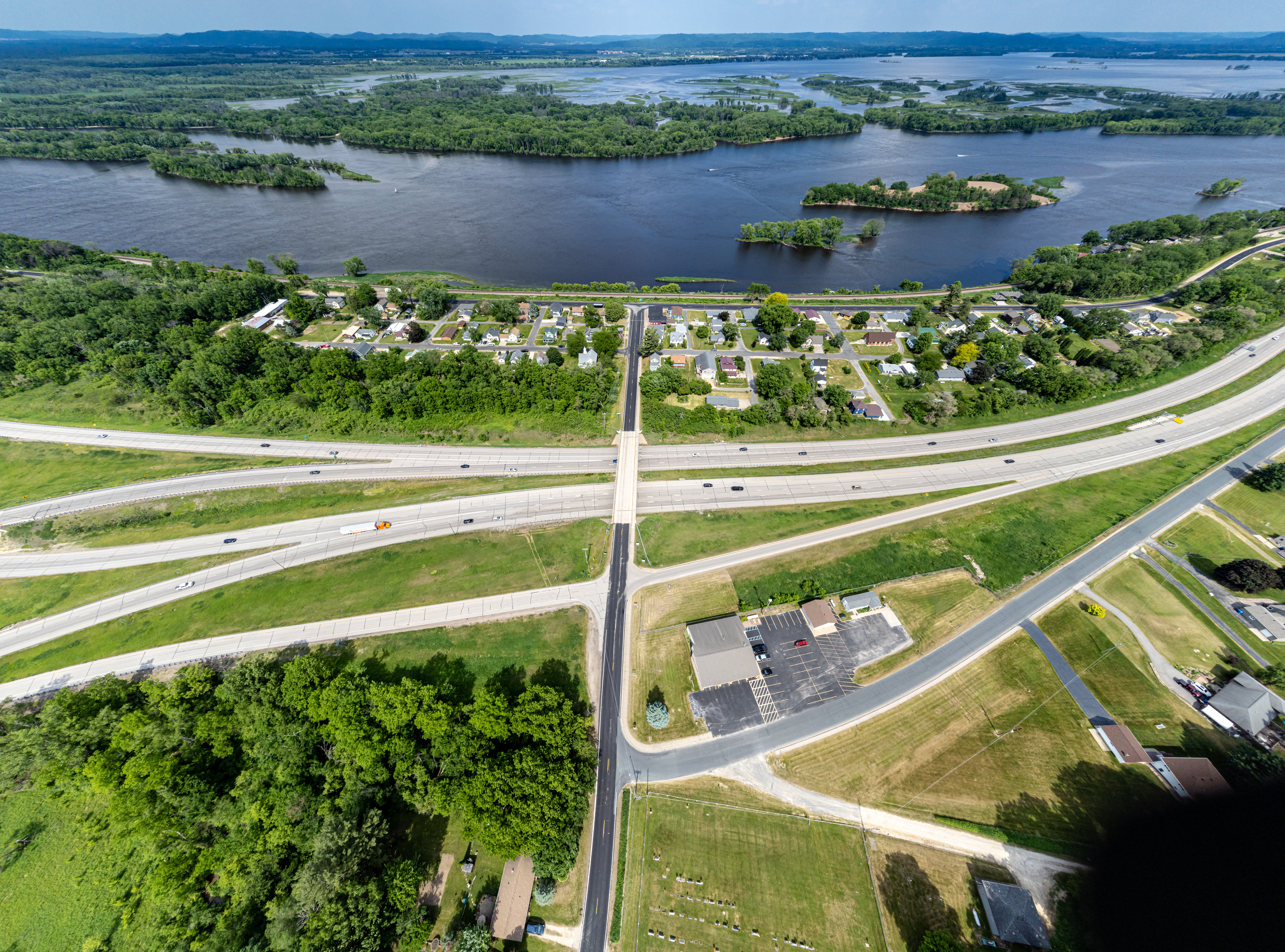

- Location of Dakota within Winona County and state of Minnesota
- Coordinates: 43°54′38″N 91°21′38″W
- Country: United States
- State: Minnesota
- County: Winona
- Founded: May 23, 1951

Government
  - Type: Mayor – Council
  - Mayor: Matthew Nelson

Area
  - Total: 0.55 sq mi (1.43 km^{2})
  - Land: 0.55 sq mi (1.43 km^{2})
  - Water: 0 sq mi (0.00 km^{2})
- Elevation: 689 ft (210 m)

Population (2020)
  - Total: 295
  - Estimate (2021): 291
  - Density: 532.7/sq mi (205.68/km^{2})
- Time zone: UTC-6 (CST)
  - Summer (DST): UTC-5 (CDT)
- ZIP code: 55925
- Area code: 507
- FIPS code: 27-14518
- GNIS feature ID: 2393705
- Website: cityofdakotamn.com

Dakota is a city in Winona County, Minnesota, United States. The population was 295 at the 2020 census.

It is located between Winona and La Crosse along Interstate 90. U.S. Highways 61 and 14 are briefly co-signed with Interstate 90 at this point. Other routes include Winona County Road 12, the Apple Blossom Scenic Drive.

== Geography ==
According to the United States Census Bureau, the city has a total area of 0.98 square miles (2.54 km^{2}); 0.65 square miles (1.68 km^{2}) is land and 0.33 square miles (0.85 km^{2}) is water.

Dakota is located along the Mississippi River. Dakota Creek and the Mississippi River meet at Dakota. Nearby places include Winona, Dresbach, Nodine, La Crescent, La Crosse, Onalaska, and Great River Bluffs State Park.

Dakota is located 18 miles south of the city of Winona, and 11 miles north of the city of La Crosse.

== History ==
Dakota was incorporated on May 23, 1951. It was laid out in 1855 and developed in 1859 by Nathan Brown, who came to Minnesota in 1847, had a stockyard, and ran a ferry service to Wisconsin. Once the center of berry growing, the main industry is now apple growing.

== Demographics ==
Historical population
Census	Pop.	Note	%±
1880	81		—
1960	339		—
1970	369		8.8%
1980	350		−5.1%
1990	360		2.9%
2000	329		−8.6%
2010	323		−1.8%
2020	295		−8.7%
2021 (est.)	291		−1.4%
U.S. Decennial Census; 2020 Census

=== 2010 census ===
As of the census of 2010, there were 323 people, 137 households, and 91 families living in the city. The population density was 496.9 inhabitants per square mile (191.9/km^{2}). There were 151 housing units at an average density of 232.3 per square mile (89.7/km^{2}). The racial makeup of the city was 99.4% White and 0.6% from two or more races.

There were 137 households, of which 28.5% had children under the age of 18 living with them, 58.4% were married couples living together, 5.1% had a female householder with no husband present, 2.9% had a male householder with no wife present, and 33.6% were non-families. 29.2% of all households were made up of individuals, and 8% had someone living alone who was 65 years of age or older. The average household size was 2.36 and the average family size was 2.92.

The median age in the city was 42.6 years. 22.6% of residents were under the age of 18; 4.4% were between the ages of 18 and 24; 26.6% were from 25 to 44; 34.1% were from 45 to 64; and 12.4% were 65 years of age or older. The gender makeup of the city was 53.3% male and 46.7% female.

=== 2000 census ===
As of the census of 2000, there were 329 people, 130 households, and 92 families living in the city. The population density was 493.1 inhabitants per square mile (190.4/km^{2}). There were 145 housing units at an average density of 217.3 per square mile (83.9/km^{2}). The racial makeup of the city was 99.70% White, 0.30% from other races. Hispanic or Latino of any race were 0.30% of the population.

There were 130 households, out of which 31.5% had children under the age of 18 living with them, 63.8% were married couples living together, 5.4% had a female householder with no husband present, and 28.5% were non-families. 27.7% of all households were made up of individuals, and 16.9% had someone living alone who was 65 years of age or older. The average household size was 2.53 and the average family size was 3.13.

In the city, the population was spread out, with 28.9% under the age of 18, 5.5% from 18 to 24, 28.3% from 25 to 44, 19.5% from 45 to 64, and 17.9% who were 65 years of age or older. The median age was 37 years. For every 100 females, there were 93.5 males. For every 100 females age 18 and over, there were 91.8 males.

The median income for a household in the city was $50,156, and the median income for a family was $53,929. Males had a median income of $38,333 versus $24,375 for females. The per capita income for the city was $17,700. About 3.6% of families and 4.7% of the population were below the poverty line, including 2.7% of those under age 18 and 3.3% of those age 65 or over.

== Transportation ==
Amtrak’s Empire Builder, which operates between Seattle/Portland and Chicago, passes through the town on CPKC tracks, but makes no stop. The nearest station is located in La Crosse, 10 miles (16 km) to the southeast.
