= Great River Bluffs State Park =

State park in Minnesota, United States

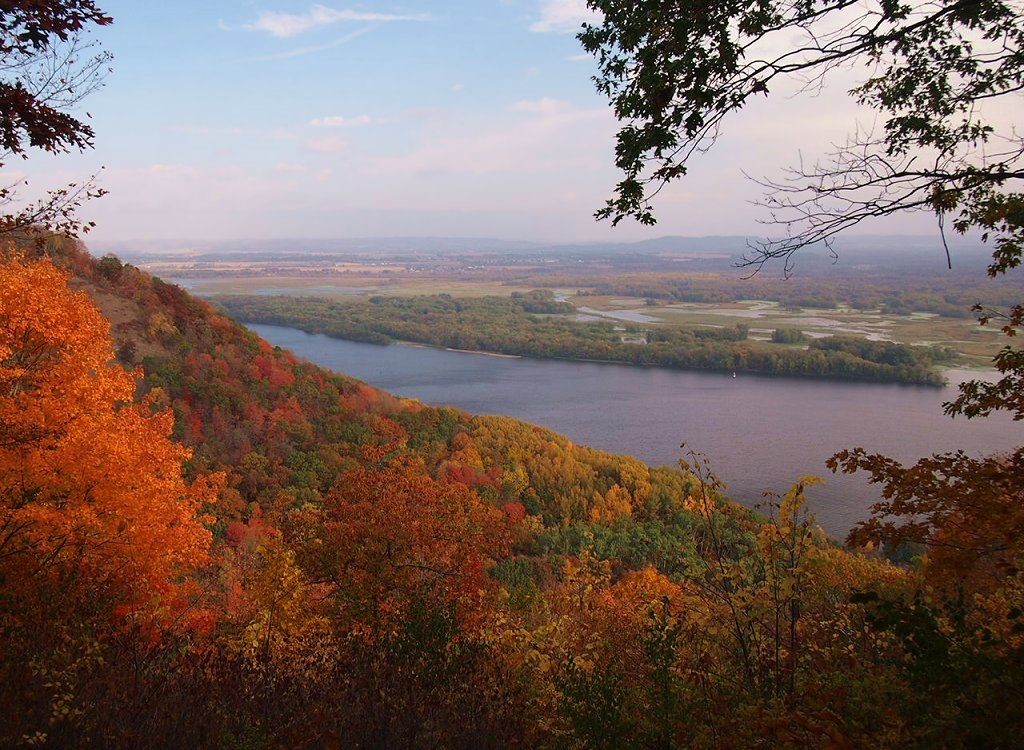
- The Mississippi River from Great River Bluffs State Park

- Location within Minnesota Location within the United States
- Location: Winona, Minnesota, United States
- Coordinates: 43°56′47″N 91°23′58″W
- Area: 3,067 acres (12.41 km^{2})
- Elevation: 1,270 ft (390 m)
- Established: 1971
- Governing body: Minnesota Department of Natural Resources

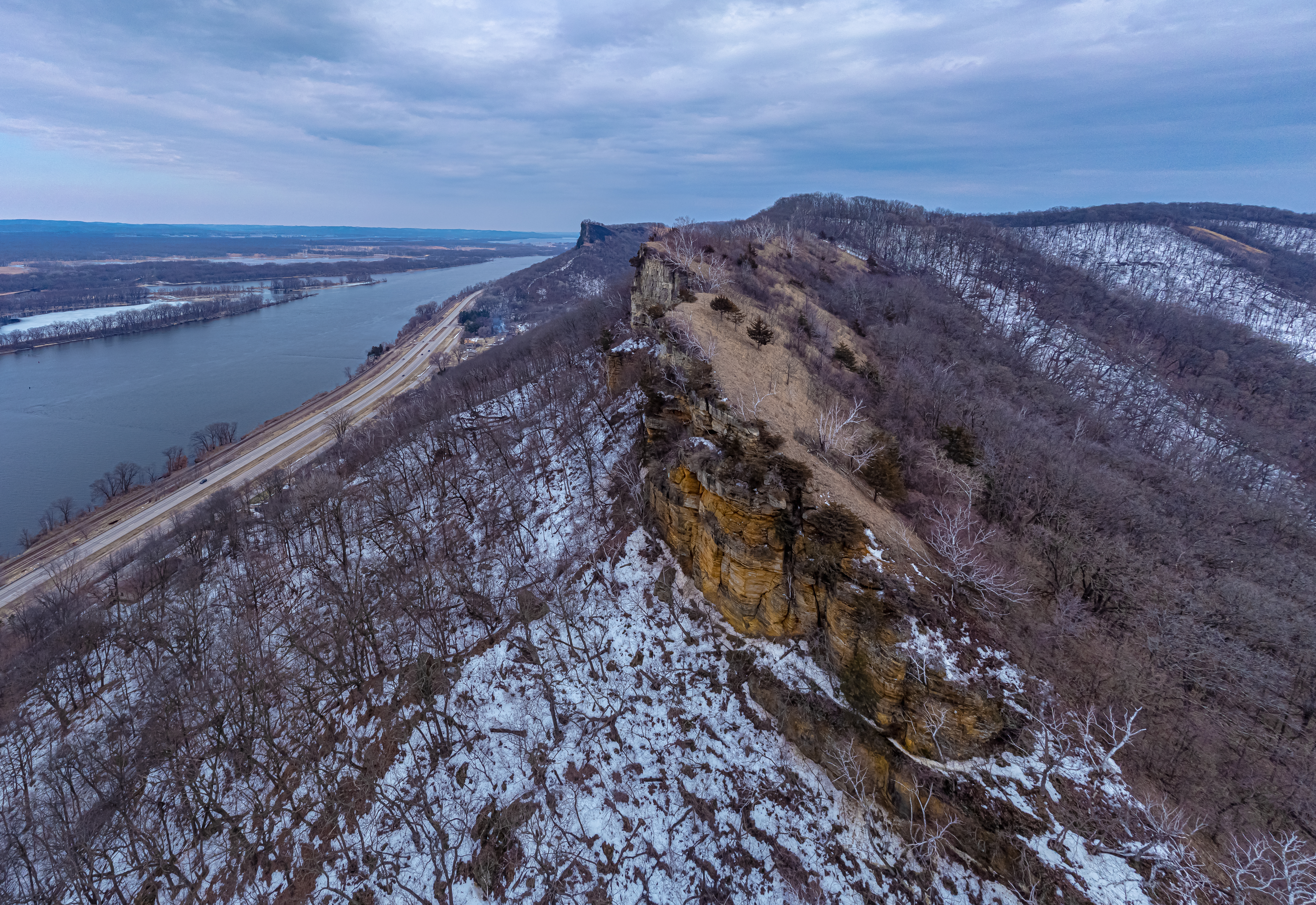
Kings bluff with Queens bluff in the background

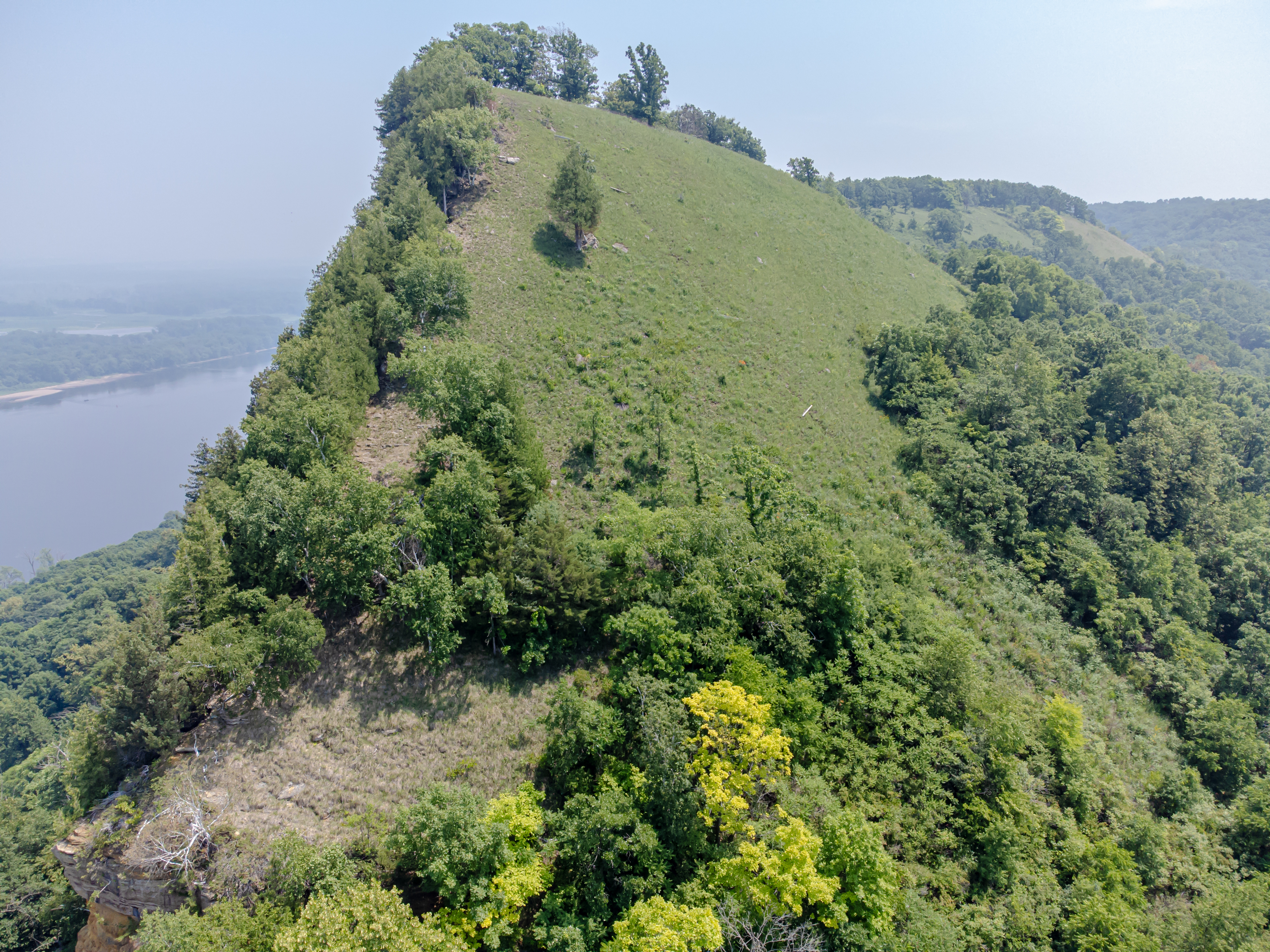
Goat prairie side

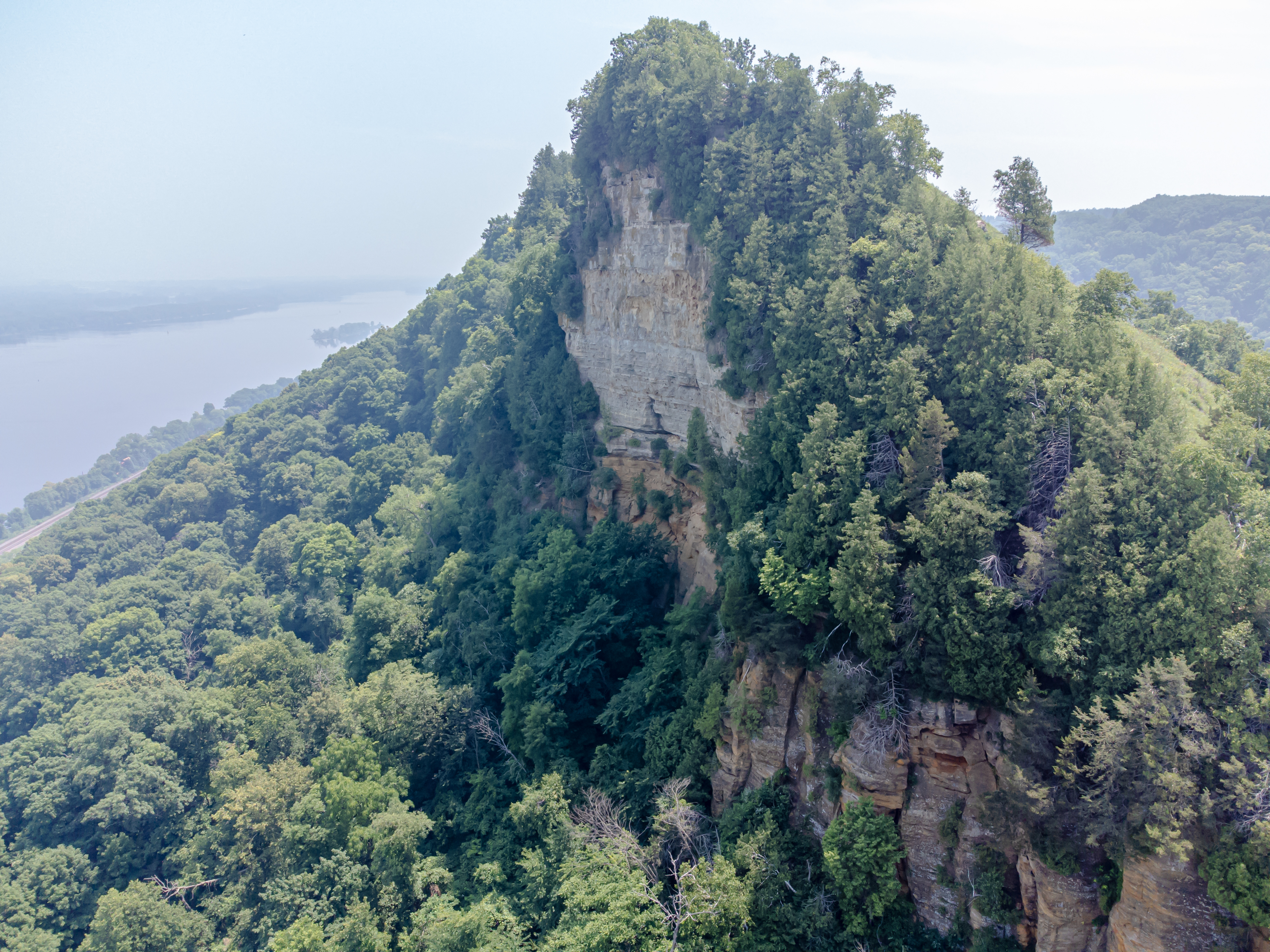
sheer side

Queens bluff

Great River Bluffs State Park is a state park of Minnesota, United States, on the Mississippi River southeast of Winona. Originally known as O. L. Kipp State Park, it was renamed in the late 1990s to describe better its resources. The park preserves steep-sided bluffs rising 500 feet (150 m) above the river and the narrow valleys between them, which support rare and fragile plant communities. Two of the bluffs have received further protection under the Minnesota Scientific and Natural Areas program, which are known as King's and Queen's Bluff Scientific and Natural Area.

== Geology ==
The region lies on sedimentary rock layers deposited on the floor of a shallow sea 500 million years ago. The lower, older layer is sandstone overlain by more recent dolomite rock. Much later a deep channel was carved into this stone by the ancient Mississippi River, which 10,000 years ago was greatly swollen from the melting glaciers to the north. The softer sandstone was eroded more easily, undercutting the dolomite on both banks of the river. The dolomite fractured off along vertical joints, leaving sheer rock faces still visible today. Side streams flowing into the Mississippi cut gullies into the river banks, creating a series of bluffs capped with erosion-resistant dolomite. Located in the Driftless Region of southeast Minnesota, the area was missed by the most recent Wisconsonian glaciation, and therefore is a region of deep river valleys dissecting the upland plains.

== Park creation ==
In the 1960s a state park was envisioned on the Mississippi river bluffs in the proximity of a highway bridge which carried many westbound travelers into Minnesota. Legislation authorizing a 1,350-acre (546 ha) park was passed in 1963. The layout was a long, narrow strip along the blufftops between La Crescent and Dresbach, sandwiched between U.S. Route 61 at the foot of the bluffs and a county road atop them. To befit a roadside park, the state highway department was asked to provide a name. They suggested O. L. Kipp State Park after Orin Lansing Kipp, who had worked for them from 1916 to 1955 and helped establish the Minnesota state highway system. However, when the state contacted the current private owners of the designated land, they proved unwilling to sell their river views, and none of the property was ever acquired.

However an alternative property to the north appeared which was both better shaped and already owned by the state. The Minnesota Department of Natural Resources' Division of Forestry had been buying up lots in the region since 1962 for what was to become the Richard J. Dorer Memorial Hardwood State Forest. Legislation in 1971 transferred 1,073 acres (434 ha) from the forestry division to the parks division, and O. L. Kipp State Park finally came into being. Development of the modest recreational facilities was slow, and the park officially opened to the public in 1976.

== Flora and fauna ==
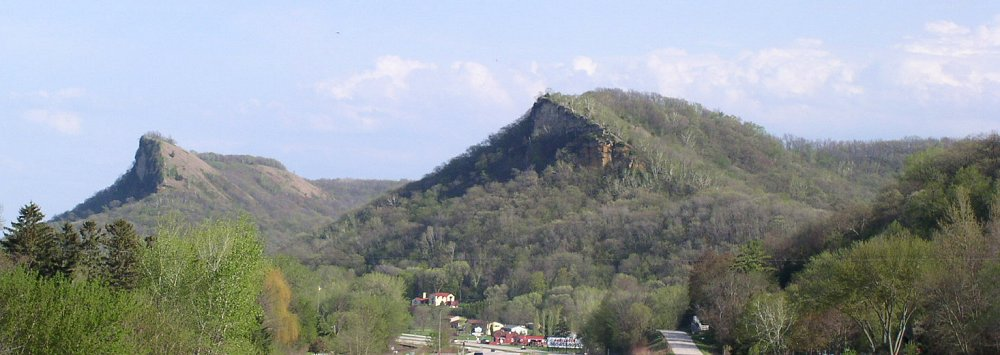
King's and Queen's Bluffs, with sheer sides facing the Mississippi River and "goat prairies" facing the southwest

European settlers had cleared much of the land for farming, but this led to significant erosion on the steep slopes. The state forestry division had been planting nonnative as well as native trees to curtail the erosion and produce harvestable timber. Under the Division of Parks and Recreation, the plantations of nonnatives like red pine went against the policy of restoring a natural habitat. As a compromise, the nonnative trees are being harvested as they reach maturity and are being replaced with more appropriate vegetation.

High up on the sides of several bluffs are rare habitats called goat prairies by locals, because they are so steep it would seem only goats could graze on them. These patches of prairie grow only on slopes between 40 and 50 degrees which face south to southwest. This orientation catches prodigious amounts of sunlight, which in winter means the ground thaws daily and freezes nightly, retarding the establishment of any woody plants.

The park also contains a relict stand of northern white cedar on Queen's Bluff, well south of its normal distribution. It arose during glacial periods and survived the subsequent warming of the local climate.

== Recreation ==
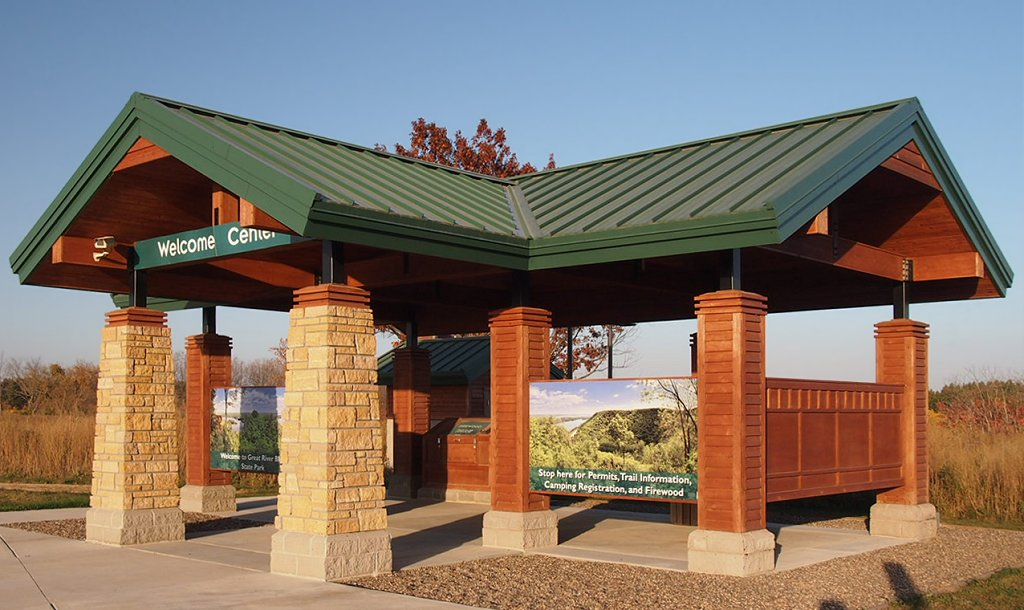
The park's unstaffed welcome center

Development in the park was limited by the steep terrain and fragile habitats. Thus the roads and trails snake along the ridgetops and are fairly level despite the varied topography. The King's Bluff Nature Trail leads out onto King's Bluff (although the far tip is still privately owned). Other short trails lead out to viewpoints, some of the Mississippi River and Wisconsin shore, and some to goat prairies overlooking a narrow valley. Queen's Bluff and certain other areas of the park are off-limits except for research, due to the rare plants and treacherous slopes (in 1976 an early visitor fell to her death from Queen's Bluff). There is a picnic area whose tables are screened from each other by trees. The main campground features 31 sites and a restroom with showers and flush toilets. A separate four-site cart-in campground is available for tents. There is also a five-site campground at the base of the bluffs for bicyclists traveling the Great River Road.
