= Minneiska =

Minneiska may refer to:

- Minneiska, Minnesota, a city in the United States
- Minneiska Township, Wabasha County, Minnesota, a township in the United States
- Minneiska apple, a variety of apple sometimes sold under the brand SweeTango
