= Minnesota State Highway 74 =

State highway in Minnesota, United States

Trunk Highway 74
- MN 74 highlighted in red

Route information
- Maintained by MnDOT
- Length: 34.956 mi (56.256 km)
- Existed: 1933–present

Major junctions
- South end: US 52 / MN 30 at Chatfield
- I-90 near St. Charles; US 14 at St. Charles
- North end: US 61 at Weaver

Location
- Country: United States
- State: Minnesota
- Counties: Fillmore, Olmsted, Winona, Wabasha

Highway system
- Minnesota Trunk Highway System; Interstate; US; State; Legislative; Scenic
← MN 73	→ US 75

Minnesota State Highway 74 (MN 74) is a 34.956-mile-long (56.256 km) highway in southeast Minnesota that runs from its intersection with U.S. Highway 52 and State Highway 30 in Chatfield and continues north to its northern terminus at its intersection with U.S. Highway 61 at Weaver along the Mississippi River. It is the only remaining road in the state highway system that is still partially unpaved.

== Route description ==
State Highway 74 serves as a north–south route in southeast Minnesota between Chatfield, St. Charles, Elba, and Weaver. It is legally defined as Legislative Route 74 in the Minnesota Statutes.

Highway 74 begins at its intersection with U.S. 52 and State Highway 30 in Chatfield and continues north through the unincorporated communities of Troy and Saratoga. Highway 74 has a junction with Interstate 90 just south of St. Charles. In St. Charles, Highway 74 becomes Main Street, also known as Whitewater Avenue, until it joins U.S. Highway 14 briefly. Highway 74 runs concurrent west with Highway 14 for less than a mile. The route continues north again, passing through Whitewater State Park and the town of Elba. The highway ends at its junction with U.S. Highway 61 in Weaver, Minnesota. About 11 miles (18 km) of the northern end of the route through the Whitewater Wildlife Management Area from Beaver to Weaver, in what is known as the Weaver Bottoms, are unpaved gravel.

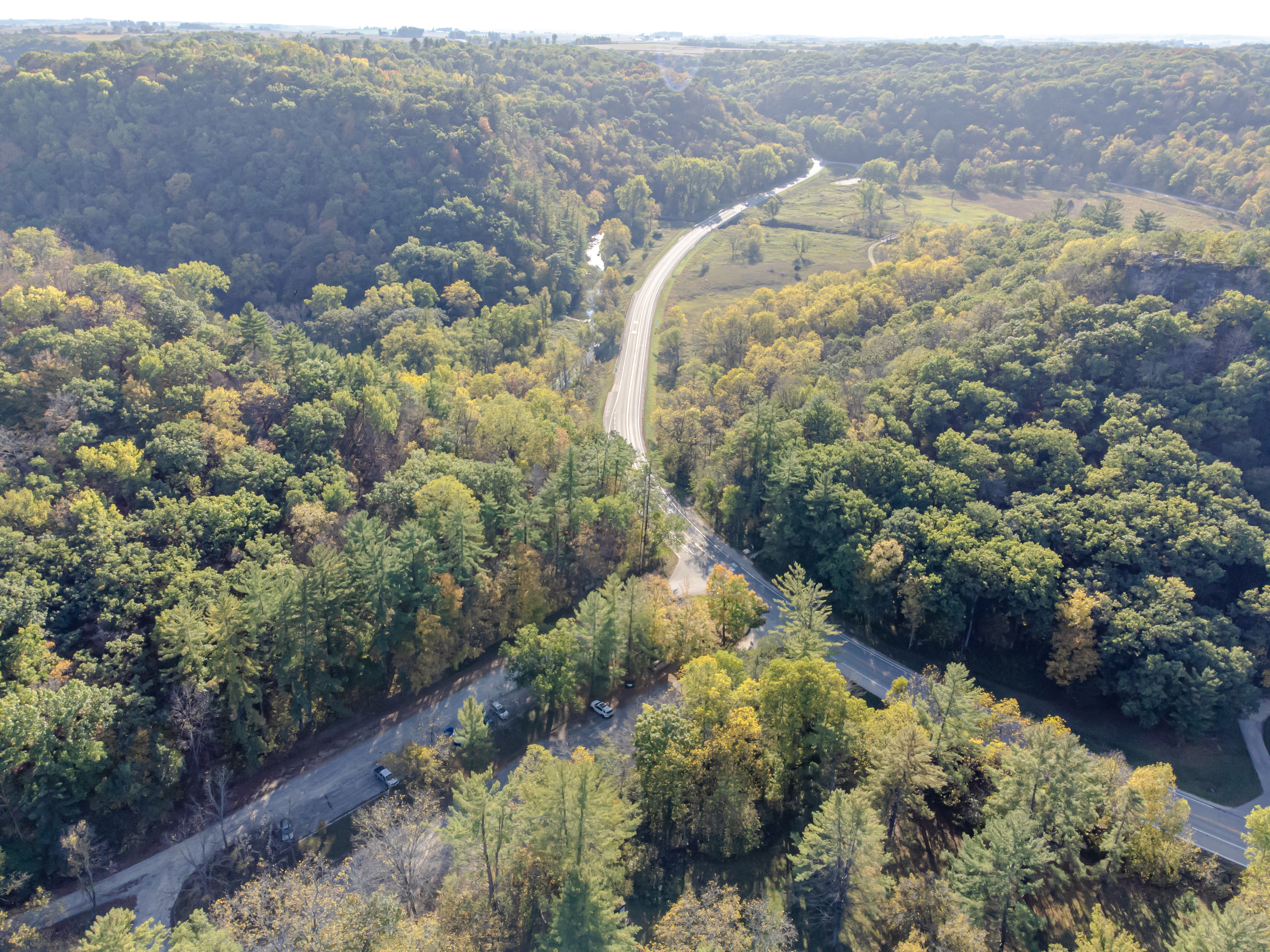
MN 74 by Whitewater State Park

== History ==
Highway 74 was authorized in 1933. The south end of Highway 74 previously extended south of Chatfield to old U.S. Highway 16 at Spring Valley until 1974. As a result of this, the present day mile markers begin at mile 20. Highway 74 follows, in part, an old route that was one of the first public roads in the Minnesota Territory.

In 1953, the route was still gravel south of U.S. Highway 14. Highway 74 was paved by 1960, except for the northernmost 7 miles (11 km). Then in summer of 2021, additional 4 miles (6.4 km) had its paving removed, extending the total unpaved portion of the route to 11 miles (18 km).

=== Flood ===
The 2007 Midwest flooding caused much damage to Highway 74. On August 18 and 19, 2007, the flooded Whitewater River destroyed bridges and washed out the roadway in several places. By 2008, repairs were complete.

== Images ==
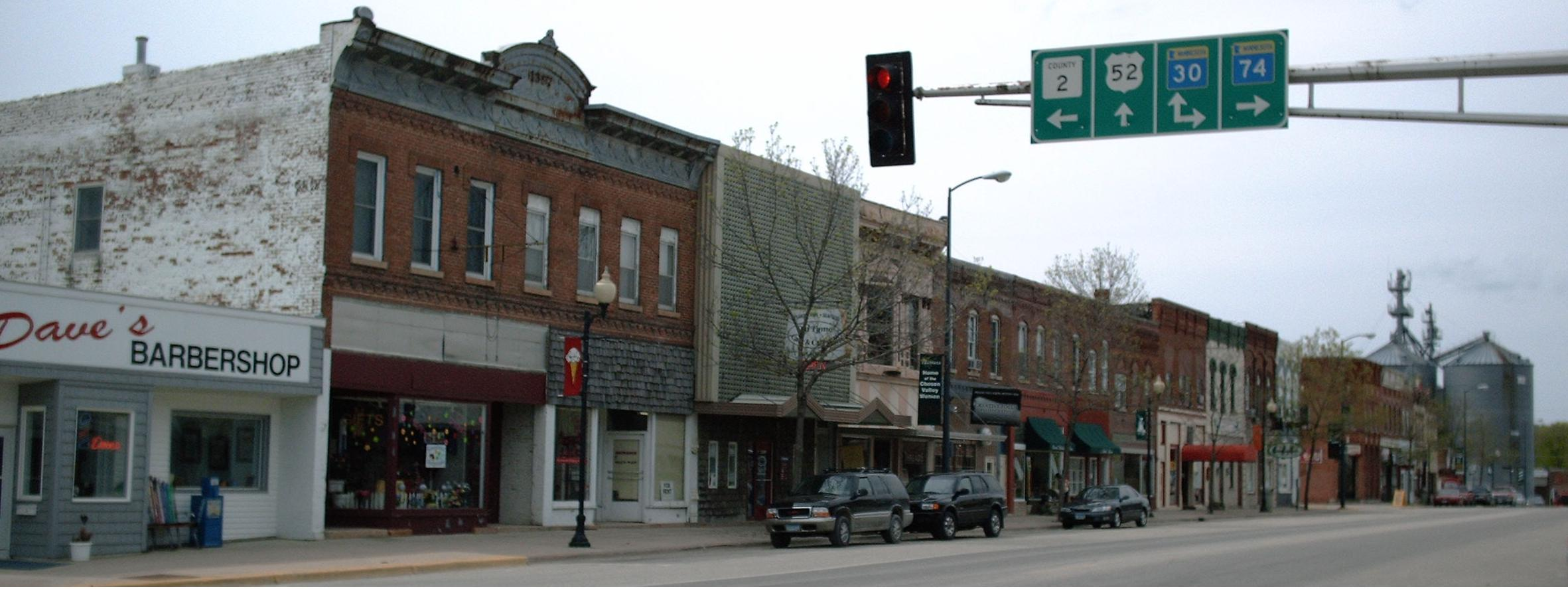
The southern terminus of MN 74 in Chatfield

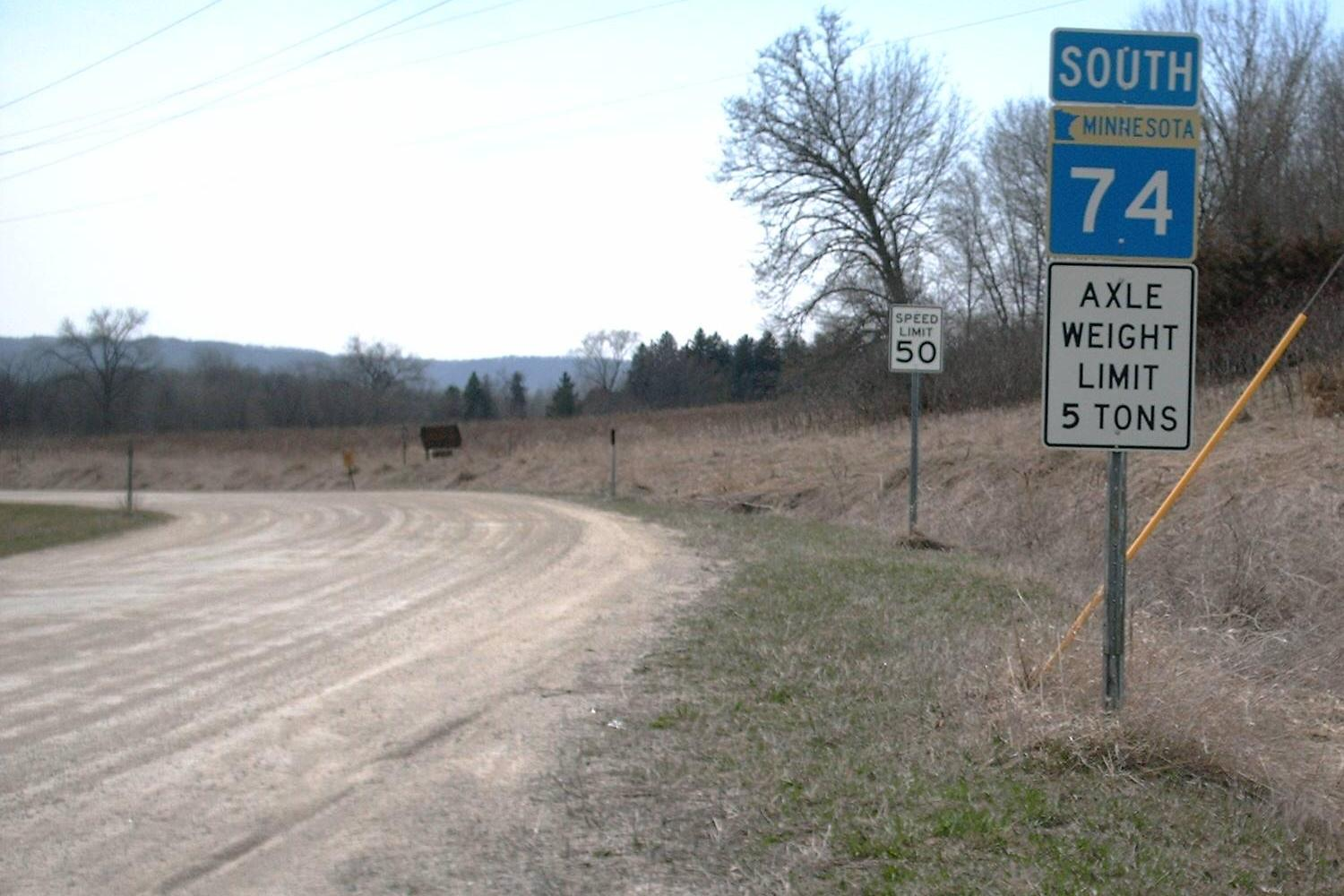
At the northern end of the unpaved portion of MN 74, near Weaver

== Major intersections ==
County	Location	mi	km	Destinations	Notes
Fillmore	Spring Valley	0.000	0.000	US 63 / US 16 – Chester IA, Preston, Austin	Programmed mile 0; former southern terminus; now MN 16
Fillmore	Chatfield	20.040	32.251	US 52 / MN 30 west / CSAH 2 – Preston, Rochester	Southern end of MN 30 overlap
Olmsted	Elmira Township	24.178	38.911	MN 30 east – Rushford	Northern end of MN 30 overlap
Winona	St. Charles Township	32.348	52.059	I-90 – Austin, La Crosse	I-90 exit 233; interchange.
Winona	St. Charles	33.719	54.265	US 14 east – Winona	Southern end of US 14 overlap
Winona	St. Charles	33.945	54.629	US 14 west – Rochester	Northern end of US 14 overlap
Wabasha	Weaver	54.996	88.507	US 61 – Wabasha, Winona	
1.000 mi = 1.609 km; 1.000 km = 0.621 mi: Closed/former; Concurrency terminus
