= Weaver, Minnesota =

Unincorporated community in Minnesota, United States

Weaver
- Unincorporated community
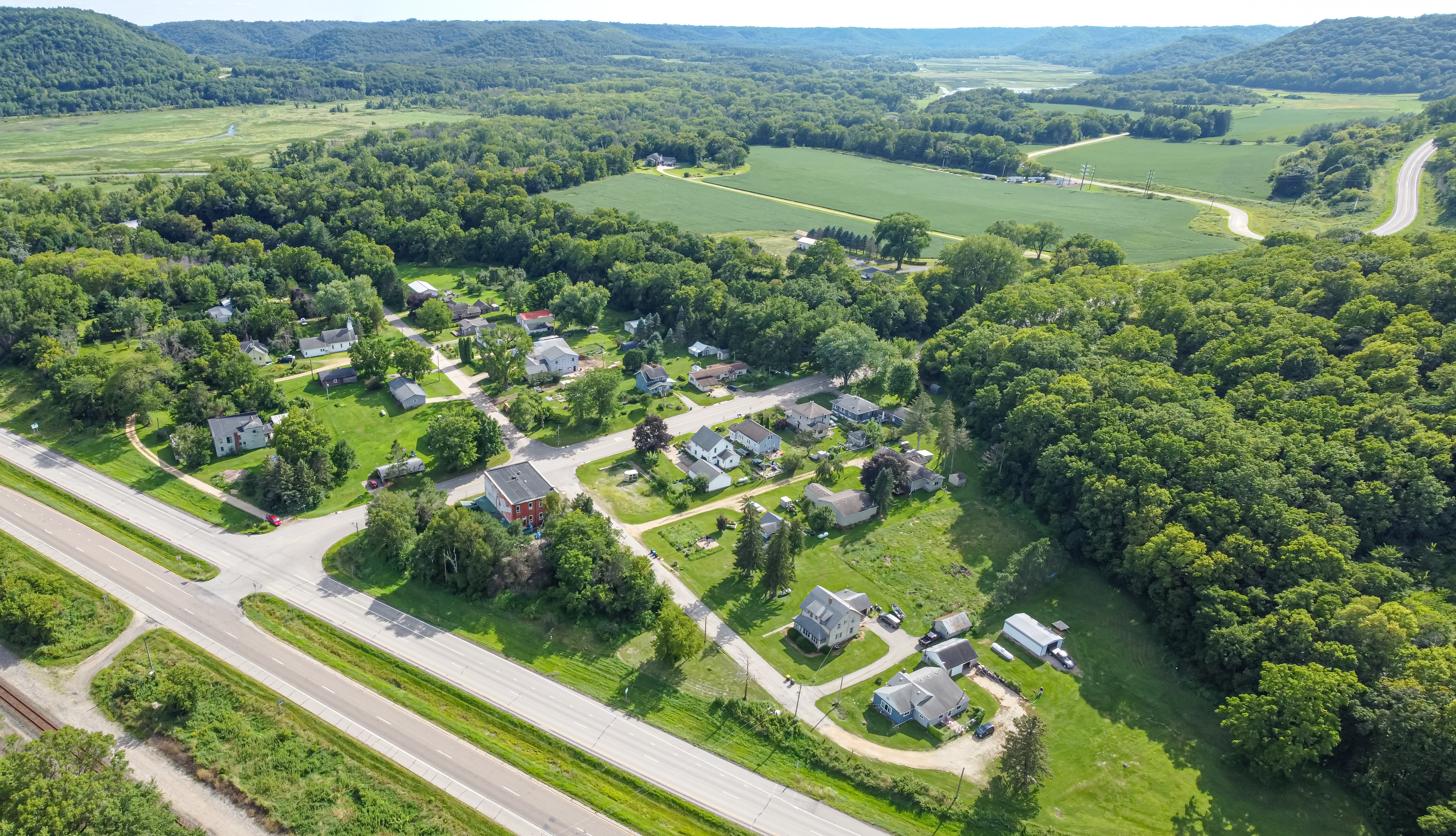
- US-61 and MN-74 junction in town

- Location within Minnesota Location within the United States
- Coordinates: 44°12′54″N 91°55′44″W
- Country: United States
- State: Minnesota
- County: Wabasha County
- Township: Minneiska Township
- Elevation: 689 ft (210 m)
- Time zone: UTC-6 (Central (CST))
  - Summer (DST): UTC-5 (CDT)
- ZIP code: 55910
- Area code: 507
- GNIS feature ID: 653873

Weaver is an unincorporated community in Minneiska Township, Wabasha County, Minnesota, United States. The Whitewater River and the Mississippi River meet at Weaver.

== Geography ==
The community is located 13 miles southeast of Wabasha along U.S. Highway 61 at the junction with State Highway 74 (MN 74). Nearby places include Wabasha, Kellogg, Minneiska, Altura, Elba, and Beaver. Other nearby places include John A. Latsch State Park, the Kellogg–Weaver Dunes Scientific Natural Area (SNA), and the Weaver Bottoms area. Wabasha County Roads 26 and 84 are also in the immediate area.

== History ==
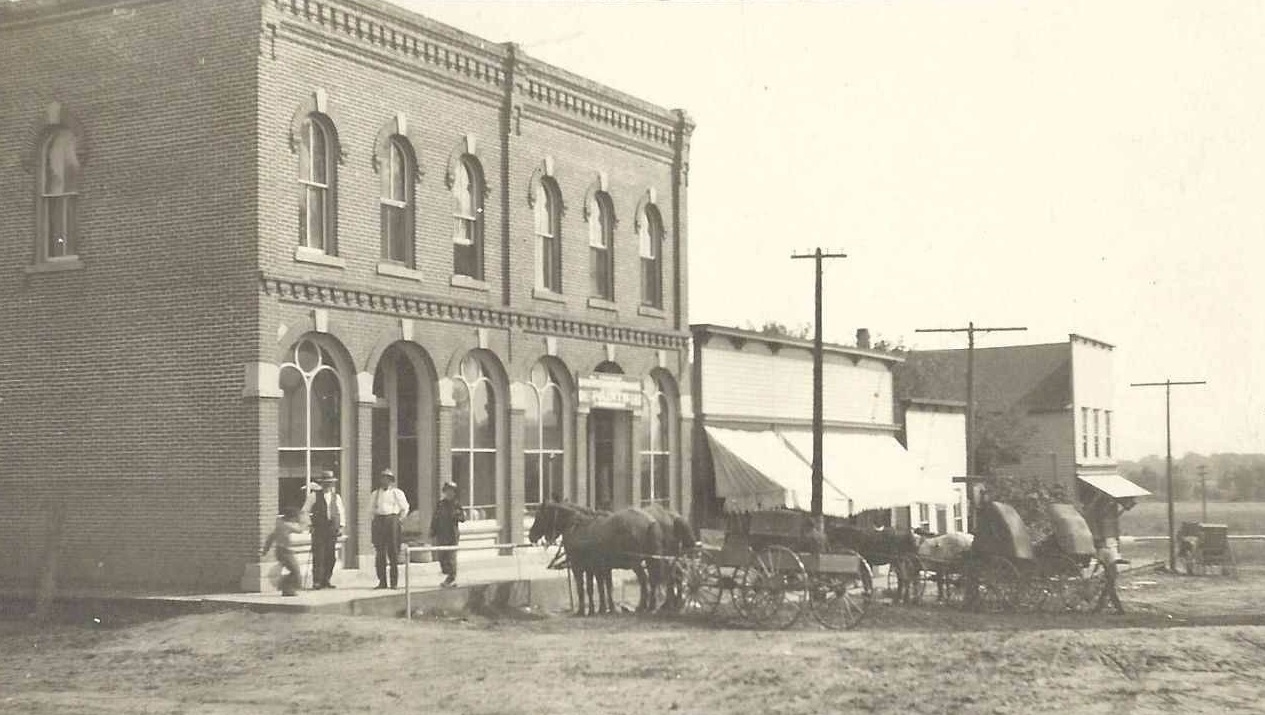
Weaver in 1912

Weaver was platted in 1871, and named for William Weaver, an early settler. A post office was established at Weaver in 1871, and remained in operation until 1971.

The community contains one property listed on the National Register of Historic Places: the 1875 Weaver Mercantile Building.

== Transportation ==
Amtrak’s Empire Builder, which operates between Seattle/Portland and Chicago, passes through the town on BNSF tracks, but makes no stop. The nearest station is located in Winona, 19 miles (31 km) to the southeast.
