= Beaver, Minnesota =

Unincorporated community in Minnesota, United States

Beaver
- Unincorporated community
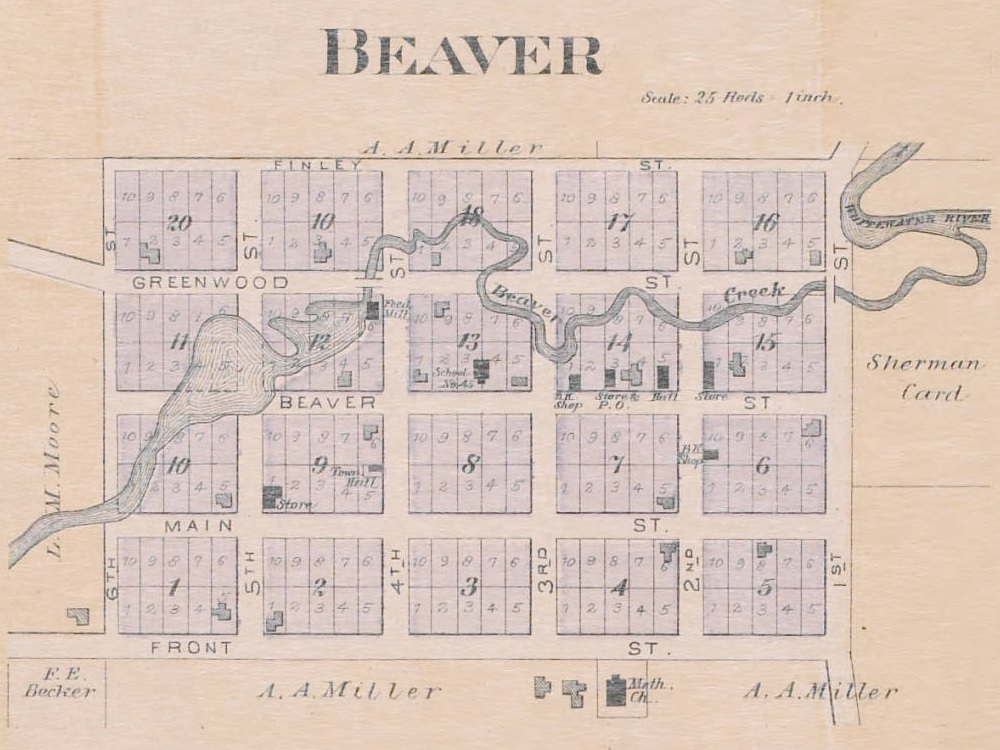
- 1894 plat map of Beaver

- Location within Minnesota Location within the United States
- Coordinates: 44°09′10.5″N 92°01′12″W
- Country: United States
- State: Minnesota
- County: Winona County
- Township: Whitewater Township
- Elevation: 709 ft (216 m)
- Time zone: UTC-6 (Central (CST))
  - Summer (DST): UTC-5 (CDT)
- ZIP code: 55910
- Area code: 507
- GNIS feature ID: 654592

Beaver is an unincorporated community in Whitewater Township, Winona County, Minnesota, United States, located near the junction of State Highway 74 and Winona County Road 30. Nearby places include Altura, Elba, Plainview, St. Charles, Weaver, and Whitewater State Park. The Whitewater River and Beaver Creek both flow through the area.

== History ==
Beaver was settled in 1854, by people from New England. It was the first community established in the Whitewater valley. The name came from observing beavers building dams on the creek that travels through the site to join with the Whitewater River. Following the example of the beavers, the early settlers decided to dam the creek to furnish power for a mill. The community was platted in 1856 by Albert Hopson, Dr. Sheldon Brooks, and William J. Duley, as 20 blocks on 40 acres (160,000 m^{2}). Beaver had a post office from 1857 to 1906. At one time, the community also had a flour mill, hardware store, general store, Methodist church, blacksmith, wagon shop, saloon (maybe two), hotel, school, and cheese factory. However, the farming practices up the hillsides encouraged erosion, and the high hills produced frequent flooding. At first rich soil came down the hillsides when rains came. Then sand from the underlying sandstone was washed down year after year covering everything. Some years because of the flooding the farmers had to plant three times. The flood deposits devastated the area, and today, most of the site is overgrown and much is swampy. In 1932, the state purchased most of the land, buildings were torn down and the Beaver area became a nature reserve.

Eleanor Putnam, age 89 in 2009, a former resident of Beaver during her childhood in the 1920s and 1930s, recalled climbing the hills around Beaver, and how her family farmed the rugged land. She recalled her uncle struggling to climb the hills to farm the top of a plateau, which can be seen in aerial photos. The Beaver Cemetery, just west of the old community center, is where many of the original settlers of Beaver were laid to rest.

Historical population
| Census | Pop. | Note | %± |
|---|---|---|---|
| 1880 | 86 | | — |
U.S. Decennial Census
