= Elba Township, Winona County, Minnesota =

Elba Township, Minnesota
- Township
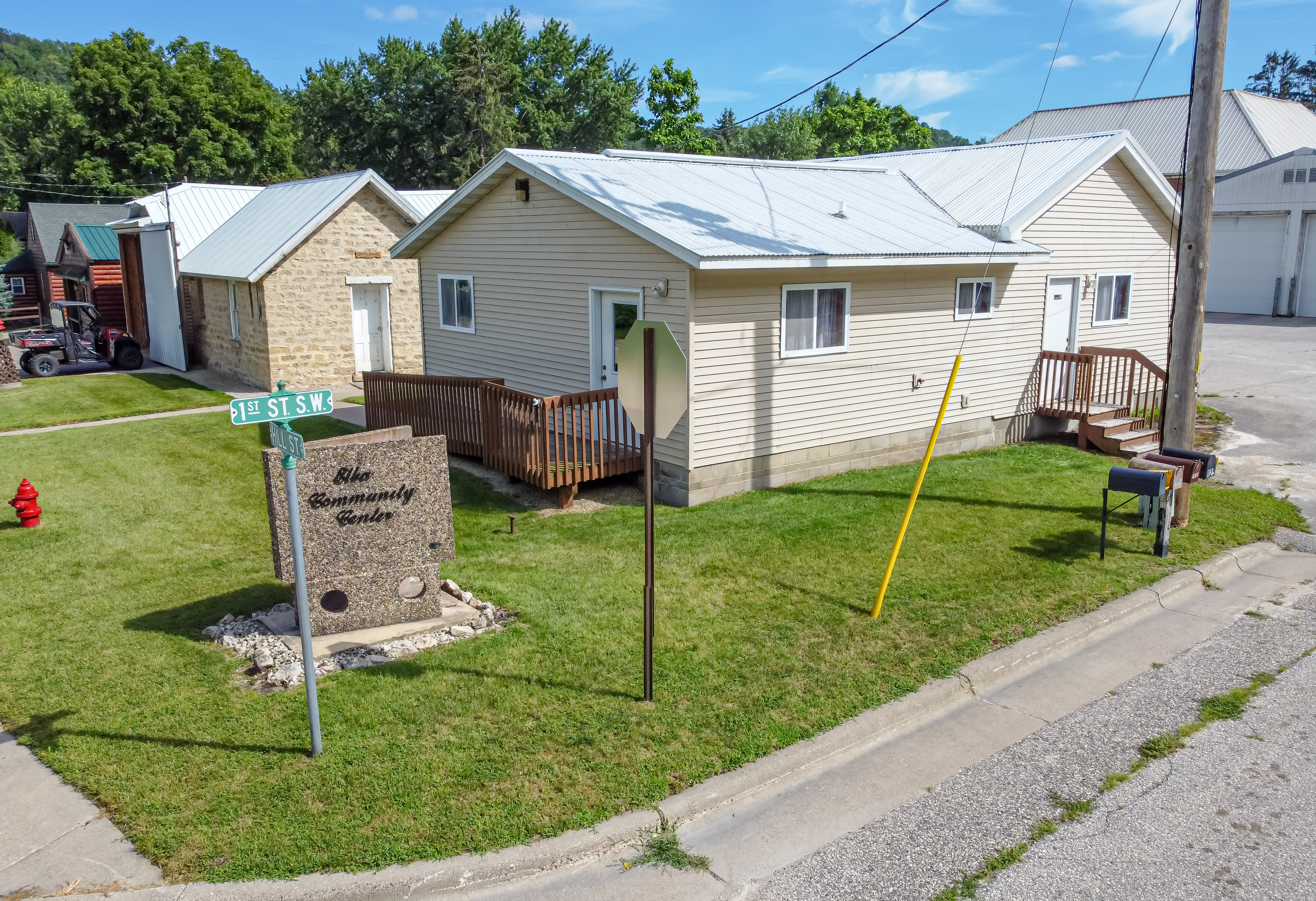
- Elba City Hall and Elba Town Hall

- Location within the state of Minnesota Elba Township, Minnesota (the United States)
- Coordinates: 44°4′16″N 92°1′16″W
- Country: United States
- State: Minnesota
- County: Winona

Area
  - Total: 33.4 sq mi (86.4 km^{2})
  - Land: 33.4 sq mi (86.4 km^{2})
  - Water: 0 sq mi (0.0 km^{2})
- Elevation: 1,096 ft (334 m)

Population (2010)
  - Total: 311
  - Density: 9.32/sq mi (3.60/km^{2})
- Time zone: UTC-6 (Central (CST))
  - Summer (DST): UTC-5 (CDT)
- ZIP code: 55910
- Area code: 507
- FIPS code: 27-18404
- GNIS feature ID: 0664059

Elba Township is a township in Winona County, Minnesota, United States. The population was 311 at the 2010 census.

== History ==
Elba Township was organized in 1858, and named after Elba, in Italy. Two properties in the township are listed on the National Register of Historic Places: the circa-1858 William Hemmelberg House and the New Deal structures of Whitewater State Park, built 1934–1941.

== Geography ==
According to the United States Census Bureau, the township has a total area of 33.4 square miles (87 km^{2}); 33.3 square miles (86 km^{2}) is land and 0.03% is water.

== Demographics ==
As of the census of 2000, there were 263 people, 91 households, and 74 families residing in the township. The population density was 7.9 inhabitants per square mile (3.1/km^{2}). There were 108 housing units at an average density of 3.2 per square mile (1.2/km^{2}). The racial makeup of the township was 98.10% White and 1.90% African American.

There were 91 households, out of which 39.6% had children under the age of 18 living with them, 80.2% were married couples living together, 1.1% had a female householder with no husband present, and 17.6% were non-families. 17.6% of all households were made up of individuals, and 7.7% had someone living alone who was 65 years of age or older. The average household size was 2.89 and the average family size was 3.27.

In the township the population was spread out, with 30.0% under the age of 18, 8.0% from 18 to 24, 24.0% from 25 to 44, 29.7% from 45 to 64, and 8.4% who were 65 years of age or older. The median age was 40 years. For every 100 females, there were 113.8 males. For every 100 females age 18 and over, there were 106.7 males.

The median income for a household in the township was $43,750, and the median income for a family was $60,000. Males had a median income of $37,000 versus $23,750 for females. The per capita income for the township was $18,246. About 2.8% of families and 3.7% of the population were below the poverty line, including 3.5% of those under the age of 18 and 8.3% of those 65 and older.
