= William Hemmelberg House =

Historic house in Minnesota, United States

- U.S. National Register of Historic Places
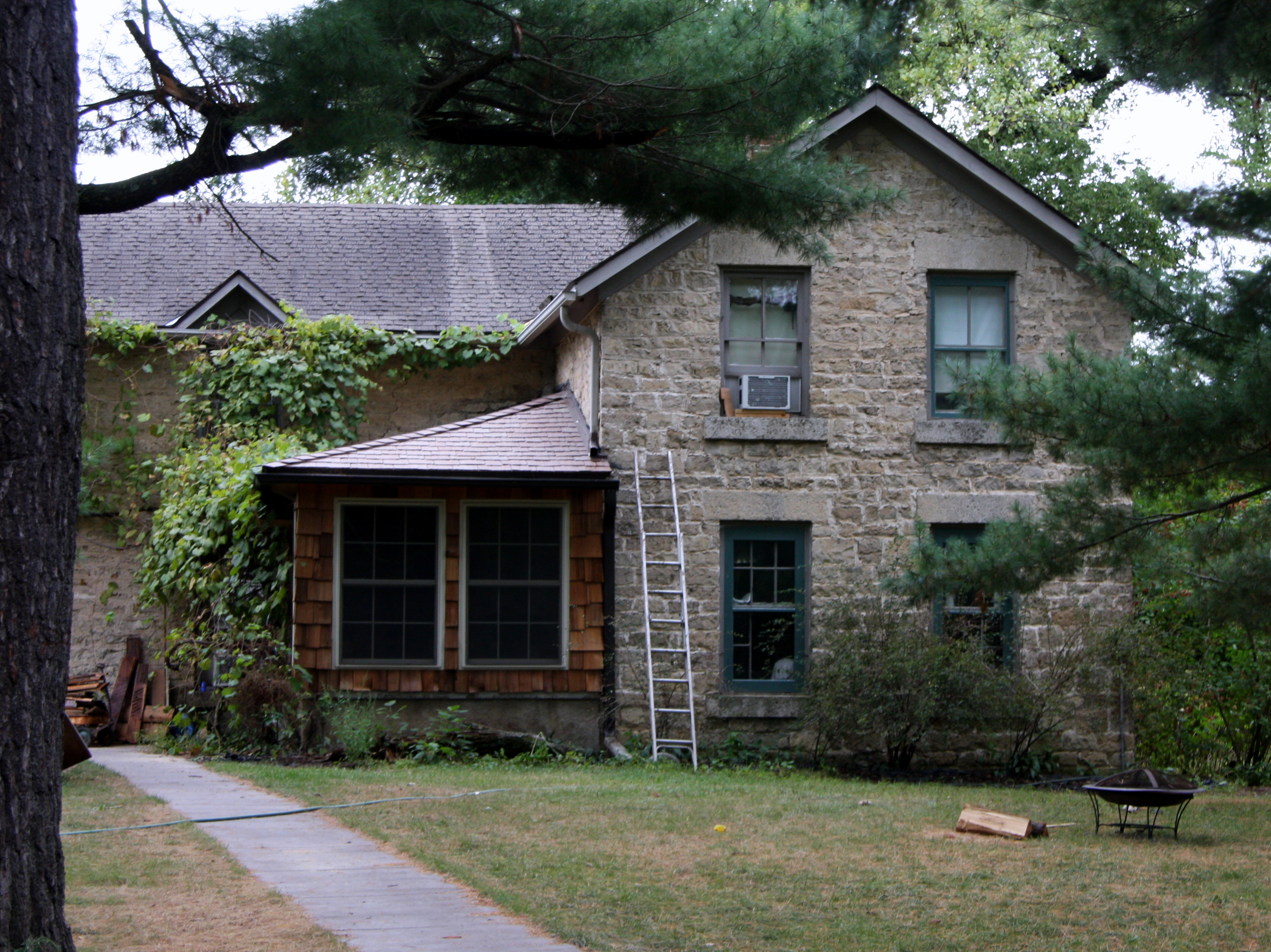
- The William Hemmelberg House viewed from the east

- Location within Minnesota Location within the United States
- Location: County Highways 26 and 37, Elba Township, Minnesota
- Coordinates: 44°5′19.5″N 91°59′30″W
- Area: 2.8 acres (1.1 ha)
- Built: c. 1858, c. 1870
- Architect: William Hemmelberg
- NRHP reference No.: 86002916
- Designated: October 23, 1986

The William Hemmelberg House is a historic stone farmhouse in Elba Township, Minnesota, United States. The original section was built around 1858 and the house was doubled in size with a circa-1870 addition. The house was listed on the National Register of Historic Places in 1986 for its local significance in the theme of exploration/settlement. It was nominated for being a rare surviving vestige of the Whitewater Valley's early pioneers.

== See also ==
- National Register of Historic Places listings in Winona County, Minnesota
