= Sheldon Brooks =

American physician and politician

Sheldon Brooks (May 20, 1811 – May 19, 1883) was an American medical doctor and politician.

Brooks was born in Redfield, Oswego County, New York. He was a farmer and a medical doctor. In 1856, Brooks moved to Minnesota and helped platt the community of Beaver, Winona County, Minnesota. He continued to farm and practiced medicine. Brooks served in the Winona County Commission and then in the Minnesota House of Representatives in 1859 and 1860. In 1862, he started a grain warehouse in Minneiska, Minnesota and was involved with the lumber business. Brooks died in Winona, Minnesota and was in failing health.
