= Minneiska Township, Wabasha County, Minnesota =

Minneiska Township, Minnesota
- Township
- Location within the state of Minnesota Minneiska Township, Minnesota (the United States)
- Coordinates: 44°13′53″N 91°55′49″W
- Country: United States
- State: Minnesota
- County: Wabasha

Area
  - Total: 17.9 sq mi (46.4 km^{2})
  - Land: 10.7 sq mi (27.7 km^{2})
  - Water: 7.2 sq mi (18.7 km^{2})
- Elevation: 666 ft (203 m)

Population (2000)
  - Total: 205
  - Density: 19/sq mi (7.4/km^{2})
- Time zone: UTC-6 (Central (CST))
  - Summer (DST): UTC-5 (CDT)
- FIPS code: 27-43054
- GNIS feature ID: 0664988

Minneiska Township is a township in Wabasha County, Minnesota, in the United States. The population was 205 at the 2000 census. The unincorporated community of Weaver is located within the township.

== History ==
Minneiska Township was organized in 1859, and given the native Dakota-language name of the Whitewater River.

The township contains one property listed on the National Register of Historic Places: the 1875 Weaver Mercantile Building.

== Geography ==
According to the United States Census Bureau, the township has a total area of 17.9 square miles (46.4 km^{2}); 10.7 square miles (27.7 km^{2}) of it is land and 7.2 square miles (18.8 km^{2}) of it (40.40%) is water.

== Demographics ==
As of the census of 2000, there were 205 people, 93 households, and 62 families residing in the township. The population density was 19.2 people per square mile (7.4/km^{2}). There were 174 housing units at an average density of 16.3/sq mi (6.3/km^{2}). The racial makeup of the township was 96.59% White, 0.49% Asian, 0.98% from other races, and 1.95% from two or more races. Hispanic or Latino of any race were 1.46% of the population.

There were 93 households, out of which 21.5% had children under the age of 18 living with them, 57.0% were married couples living together, 5.4% had a female householder with no husband present, and 32.3% were non-families. 26.9% of all households were made up of individuals, and 9.7% had someone living alone who was 65 years of age or older. The average household size was 2.20 and the average family size was 2.59.

In the township the population was spread out, with 17.1% under the age of 18, 5.4% from 18 to 24, 17.6% from 25 to 44, 39.5% from 45 to 64, and 20.5% who were 65 years of age or older. The median age was 49 years. For every 100 females, there were 115.8 males. For every 100 females age 18 and over, there were 117.9 males.

The median income for a household in the township was $35,313, and the median income for a family was $38,750. Males had a median income of $25,750 versus $25,625 for females. The per capita income for the township was $19,001. None of the families and 3.5% of the population were living below the poverty line.
