= Weaver Mercantile Building =

- U.S. National Register of Historic Places
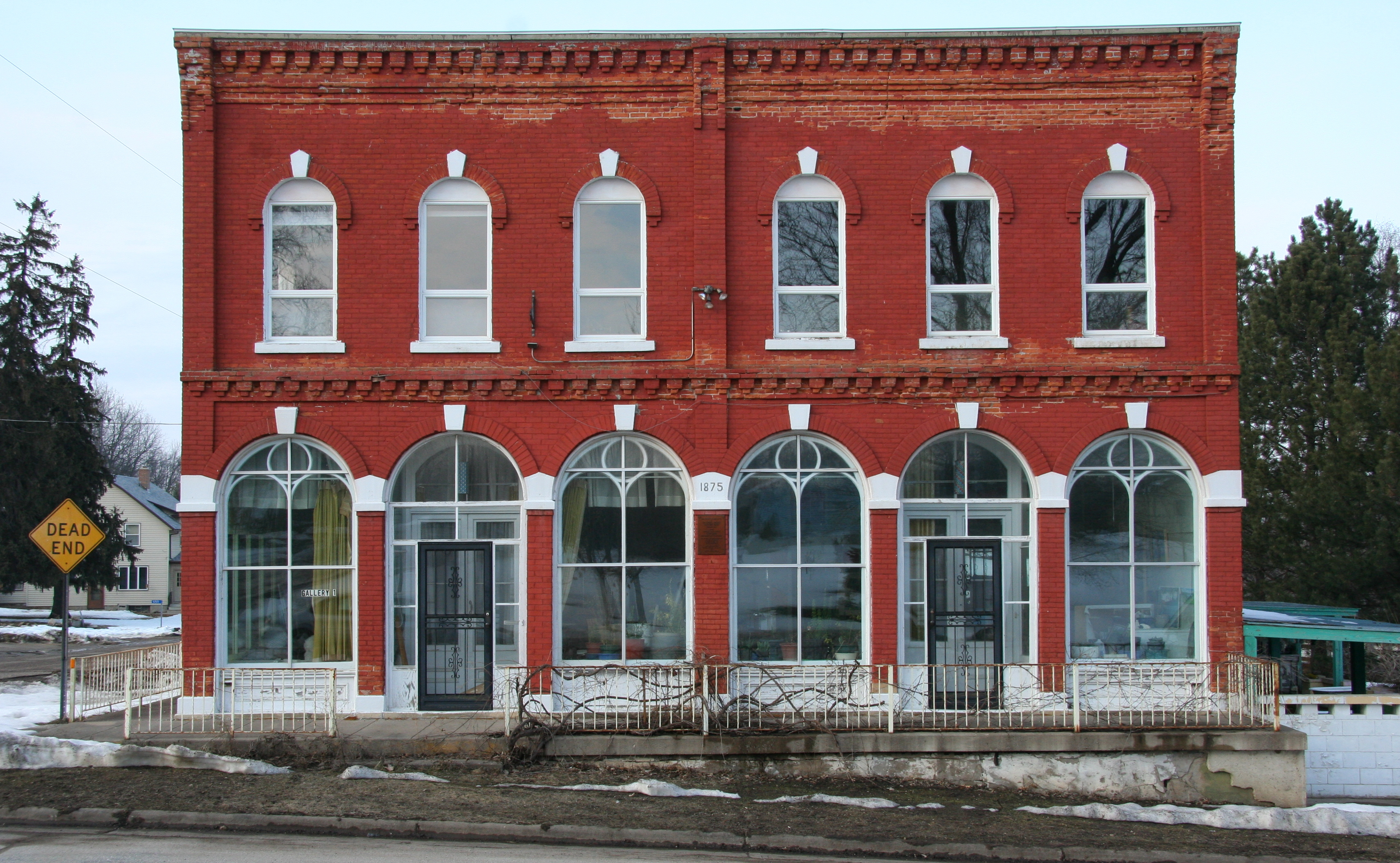
- The Weaver Mercantile Building from the south

- Location within Minnesota Location within the United States
- Location: U.S. 61 and Minnesota 74, Weaver, Minnesota
- Coordinates: 44°12′55″N 91°55′43″W
- Area: Less than one acre
- Built: 1875
- Architectural style: Italianate
- NRHP reference No.: 78001567
- Designated: September 21, 1978

The Weaver Mercantile Building is a historic building in the unincorporated community of Weaver, Minnesota, United States, built in 1875. It was listed on the National Register of Historic Places in 1978 for having local significance in the themes of architecture and commerce. It was nominated for being one of the few surviving commercial buildings in the once-thriving Mississippi River community, and a well-preserved example of a form of commercial Italianate architecture popular along the river valley.

== See also ==
- National Register of Historic Places listings in Wabasha County, Minnesota
