= St. Charles Township, Winona County, Minnesota =

St. Charles Township, Minnesota
- Township
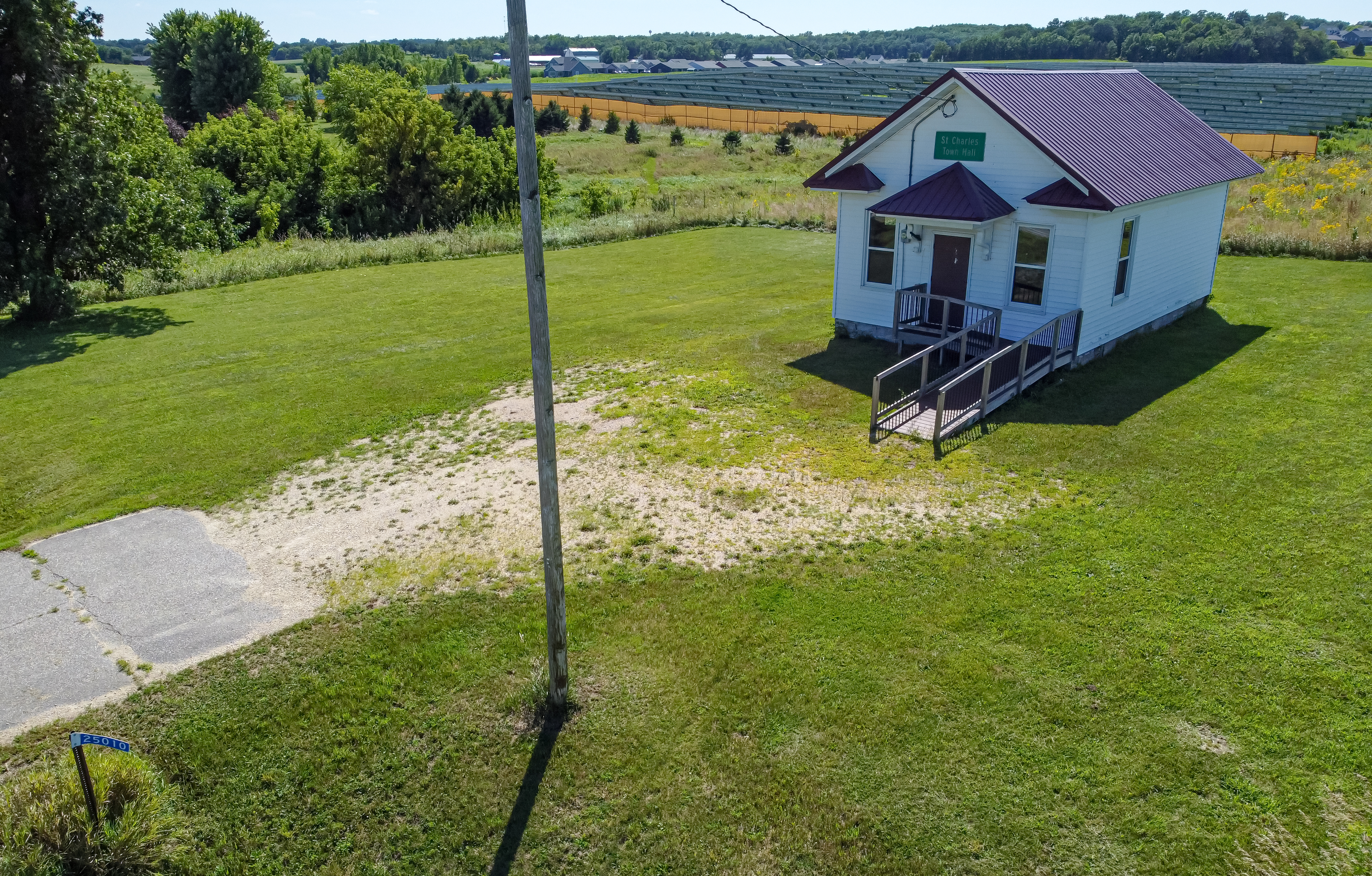
- Town hall on County Road 119 northwest of St. Charles

- Location within Minnesota Location within the United States
- Coordinates: 43°58′7″N 92°1′11″W
- Country: United States
- State: Minnesota
- County: Winona

Area
  - Total: 32.3 sq mi (83.7 km^{2})
  - Land: 32.3 sq mi (83.7 km^{2})
  - Water: 0 sq mi (0.0 km^{2})
- Elevation: 1,122 ft (342 m)

Population (2010)
  - Total: 629
  - Density: 19.5/sq mi (7.51/km^{2})
- Time zone: UTC-6 (Central (CST))
  - Summer (DST): UTC-5 (CDT)
- FIPS code: 27-56806
- GNIS feature ID: 0665506

St. Charles Township is a township in Winona County, Minnesota, United States. The population was 629 at the 2010 census. The township was organized in 1858, and named for Saint Charles Borromeo (1538–1584), an Italian saint and cardinal.

== Geography ==
According to the United States Census Bureau, the township has a total area of 32.3 square miles (83.7 km^{2}), all land.

== Demographics ==
At the 2000 census, there were 610 people, 191 households and 158 families residing in the township. The population density was 18.9 per square mile (7.3/km^{2}). There were 198 housing units at an average density of 6.1/sq mi (2.4/km^{2}). The racial makeup of the township was 98.52% White, 0.33% Native American, 0.16% Asian, 0.33% from other races, and 0.66% from two or more races. Hispanic or Latino of any race were 1.31% of the population.

There were 191 households, of which 46.6% had children under the age of 18 living with them, 76.4% were married couples living together, 4.7% had a female householder with no husband present, and 16.8% were non-families. 13.6% of all households were made up of individuals, and 5.2% had someone living alone who was 65 years of age or older. The average household size was 3.19 and the average family size was 3.57.

35.6% of the population were under the age of 18, 8.2% from 18 to 24, 24.9% from 25 to 44, 23.8% from 45 to 64, and 7.5% who were 65 years of age or older. The median age was 33 years. For every 100 females, there were 100.7 males. For every 100 females age 18 and over, there were 97.5 males.

The median household income was $51,250 and the median family income was $60,000. Males had a median income of $30,982 versus $26,023 for females. The per capita income for the township was $16,209. About 9.9% of families and 14.8% of the population were below the poverty line, including 22.8% of those under age 18 and 9.3% of those age 65 or over.
