= 2007 Midwest flooding =

Natural disaster in the United States

Meteorological history
- Duration: August 17–24, 2007

Overall effects
- Fatalities: 18
- Damage: > $549 million
- Areas affected: Illinois, Indiana, Iowa, Minnesota, Ohio, and Wisconsin

The 2007 Midwest flooding was a major flooding event that occurred in the Midwestern United States in the third week of August 2007. While Hurricane Dean was affecting the Yucatán Peninsula and the Gulf of Mexico, and Tropical Storm Erin was affecting Oklahoma and Texas, a persistent storm system hung over the Midwest for several days, causing repeated flash flooding in the US states of Illinois, Indiana, Iowa, Minnesota, Ohio, and Wisconsin. Cool Canadian air clashed with large quantities of warm moist air from the Gulf, producing torrential rains along a stationary front. 5 deaths across the central United States were attributed to the resulting flooding. Seven Minnesota counties, eight Ohio counties, fourteen counties in Wisconsin, and seven counties in Illinois were declared Federal Disaster Areas.

== Meteorological synopsis ==
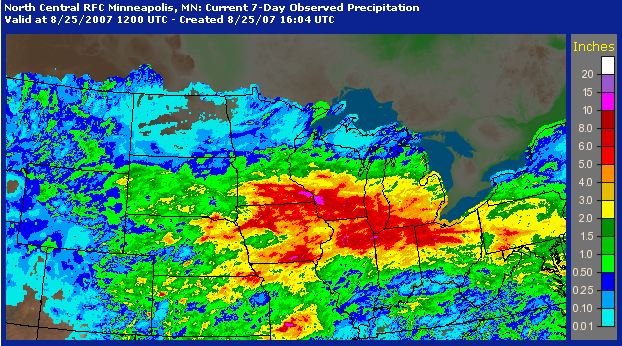
Radar estimated rainfall totals from August 18–25, 2007.

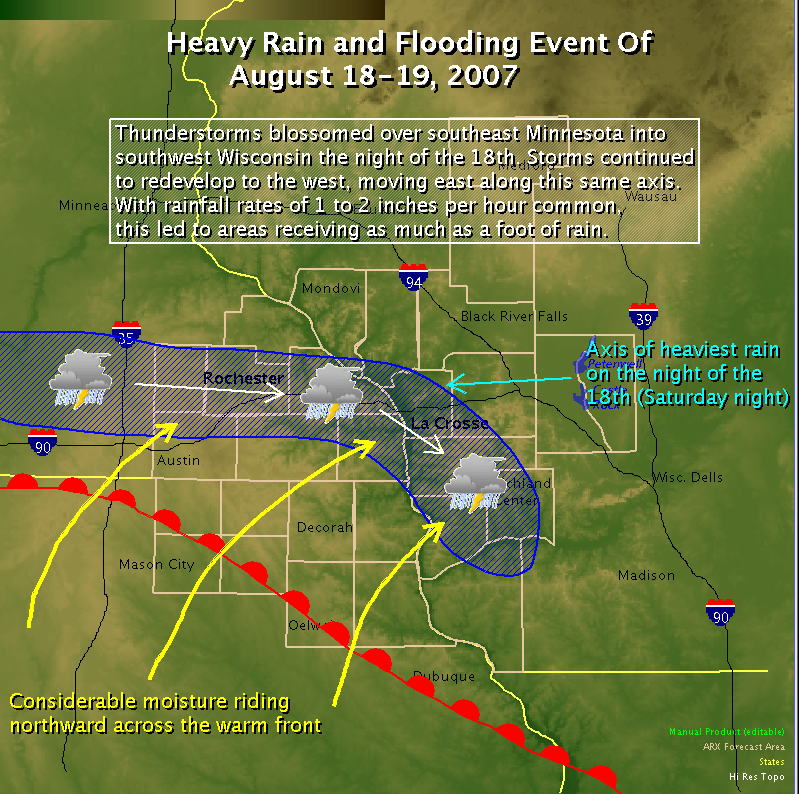
Weather map from National Weather Service

On Saturday, August 18, a warm front pushed northward into Iowa and Illinois, where it became stationary. Warm, moist air pushing over the frontal boundary fueled showers and thunderstorms that moved in a west-to-east fashion, training over the same areas for hours at a time. Some parts of Minnesota, Wisconsin and Iowa saw moderate to heavy rain for nearly a full day before the activity finally cleared out. Additional thunderstorms formed over these areas on Sunday, August 19, exacerbating the flooding problems. Tropical Storm Erin had pushed into the coast of Texas on August 15, and by August 18 had stalled over Oklahoma. Though the remnants of Erin did not directly impact the flooding in these areas, moisture from Erin streamed northward, enhancing the thunderstorm activity for two to three days.

The stationary front and associated energy then extended eastward through Illinois, Indiana and Ohio on August 19 and 20. Similarly, the front was the focus for thunderstorm development, and the precipitation continued moving over the same areas, leading to extended periods of heavy rainfall. Approximately 1,000,000 homes lost electricity due to the storms.

Runoff from the heavy rain also caused river flooding to the south of the affected areas. The Rock River near Joslin, Illinois peaked at 17.11 feet, 5.11 feet (1.56 m) above flood stage. Moderate flooding was also reported on the Mississippi River from the Quad Cities to St. Louis, Missouri.

Summary of Casualties and Damage
State	Counties affected	Fatalities	Estimated Damage
Illinois	7	2	$22.8 million
Indiana	1	0	$5 million
Iowa		1	$8 million
Minnesota	7	7	$179 million
Ohio	6	1	$241 million
Wisconsin	5	3	$93 million

== Illinois ==
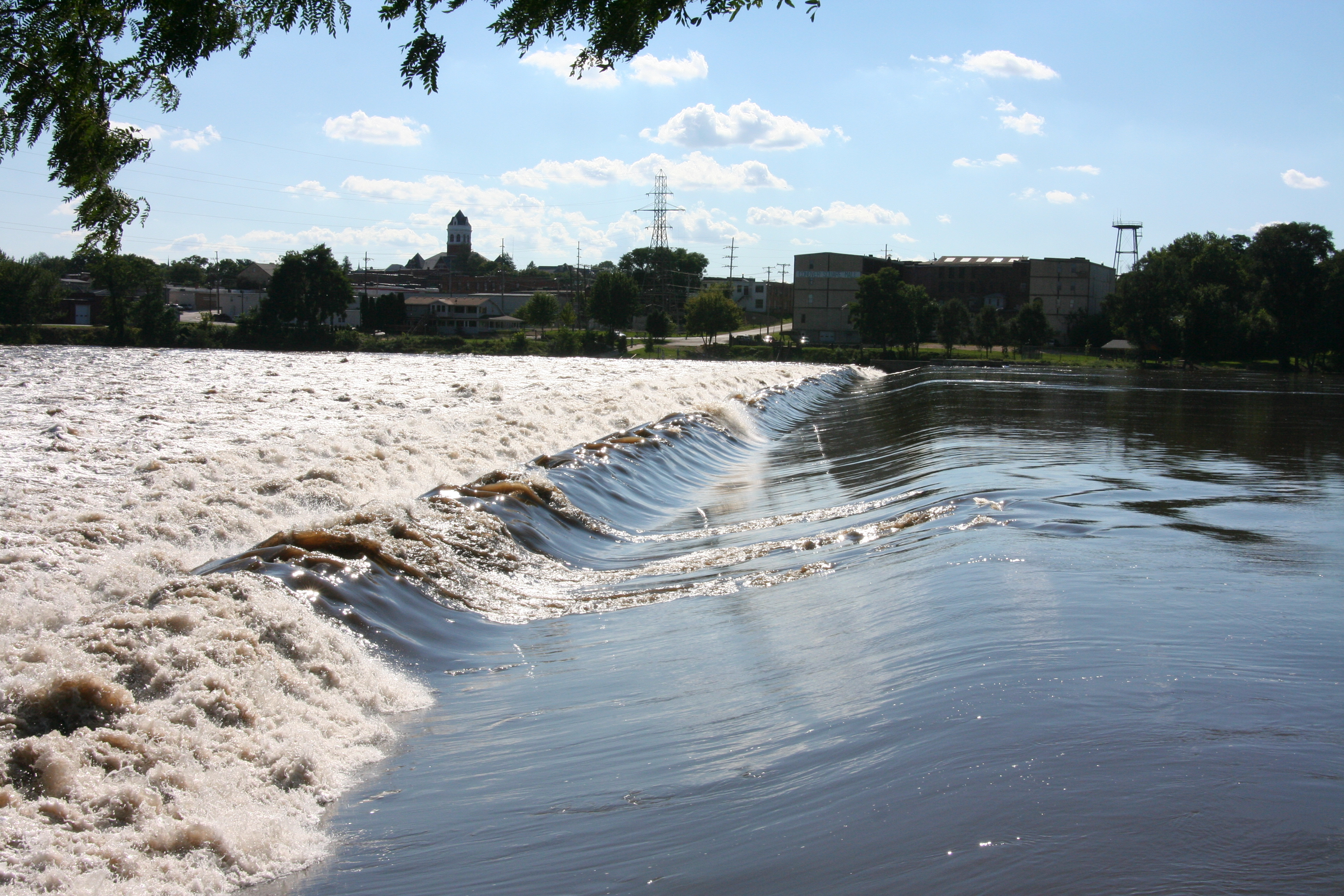
The Rock River cascading over the Oregon Dam on August 25, between Dixon and Byron, Illinois. See comparison photo.

The city of Rockford, Illinois was deluged in the weeks preceding the major flooding during the third week of August. On August 7, Rockford was hit by five to seven inches (127–178 mm) of rain. Many streets, including main thoroughfares, were flooded. There was also fear that the Alpine Dam might break. The following day, Governor Rod Blagojevich declared both Rockford and Winnebago County a state disaster area. With this declaration, he dispatched both the Illinois Emergency Management Agency and the Illinois Department of Natural Resources to assist the city. Debris removal, law enforcement, damage assessment, and other physical assistance were offered by the governor.

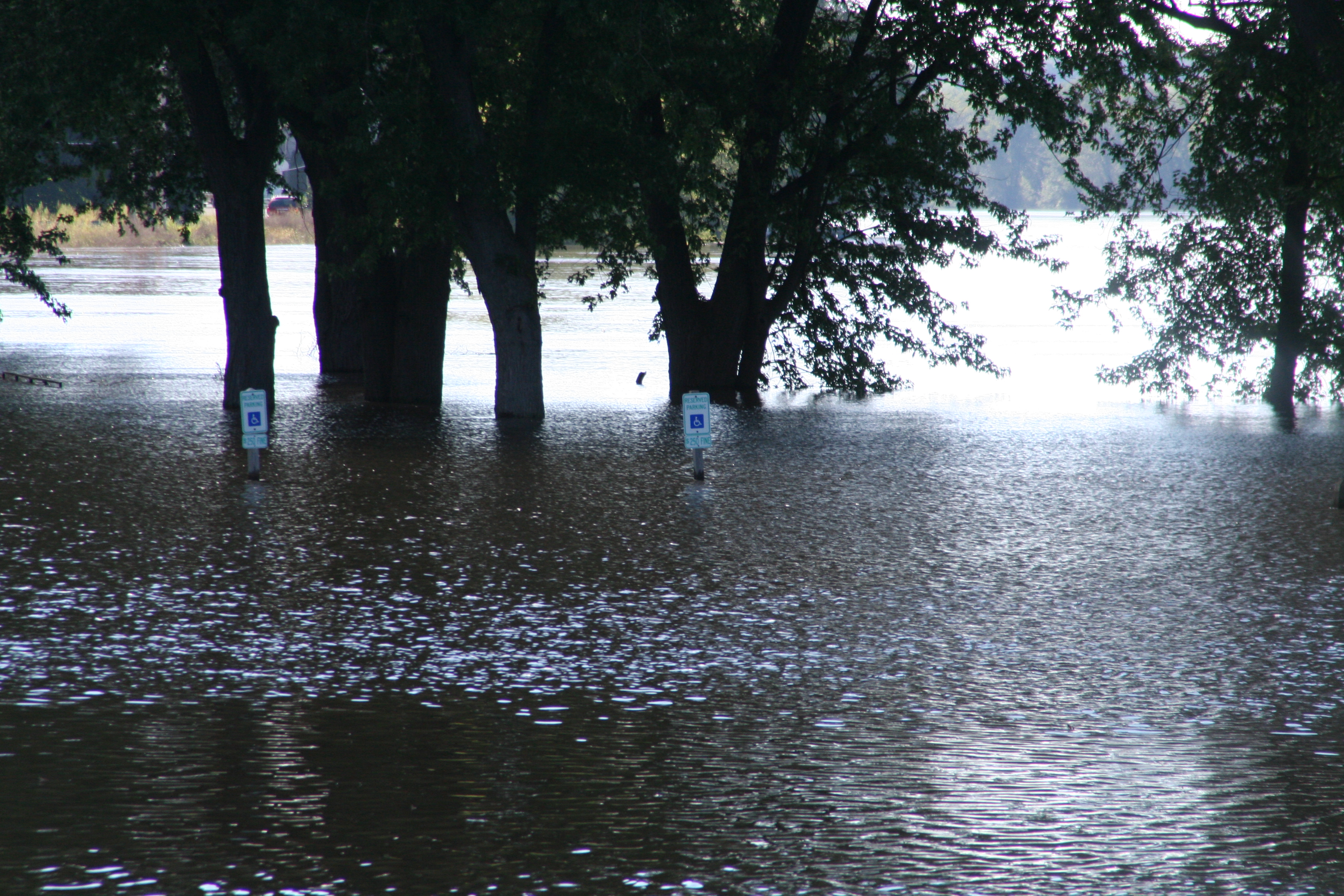
The Rock River poured into this riverside park in Byron, Illinois on August 24–25.

Two weeks later on August 23, violent storms rolled through most of the Chicago metropolitan area. Tornado warnings were issued during the first round of storms, which produced wind gusts as high as 80 miles per hour (130 km/h); the highest being reported in Manhattan. A small tornado was reported in Bolingbrook in a DuPage County Forest Preserve. The storms shut down airports (including O'Hare International Airport and Midway International Airport), uprooted trees and left over 600,000 residents in northern Illinois without power, some for several days. The storms also caused flooding on streets and major expressways such as the Bishop Ford Freeway. Rainfall totals in Boone and LaSalle Counties topped 1987 records. Governor Rod Blagojevich declared McHenry, Lake, Cook (including Chicago), DuPage, and Kane counties to be disaster areas after the storm. Flooding across northern Illinois was widespread in the aftermath of the storms. Along the Rock River in Byron, the river reached moderate flood stage on August 24; moderate stage is above 14 feet (4 m). Officials in Ogle County recommended that people in low-lying areas along the Rock River, and along Killbuck Creek near Lindenwood, evacuate to higher ground. Downstream, in Lee County at Dixon, the river had not reached flood stage as off August 25, though it continued to rise. Though not affected by flooding as it was on August 7, the city of Rockford received 1.23 inches (31 mm) of rain, setting an all-time record for Rockford's wettest month in recorded climate data history, with a total of 13.82 inches (351 mm) of rain.

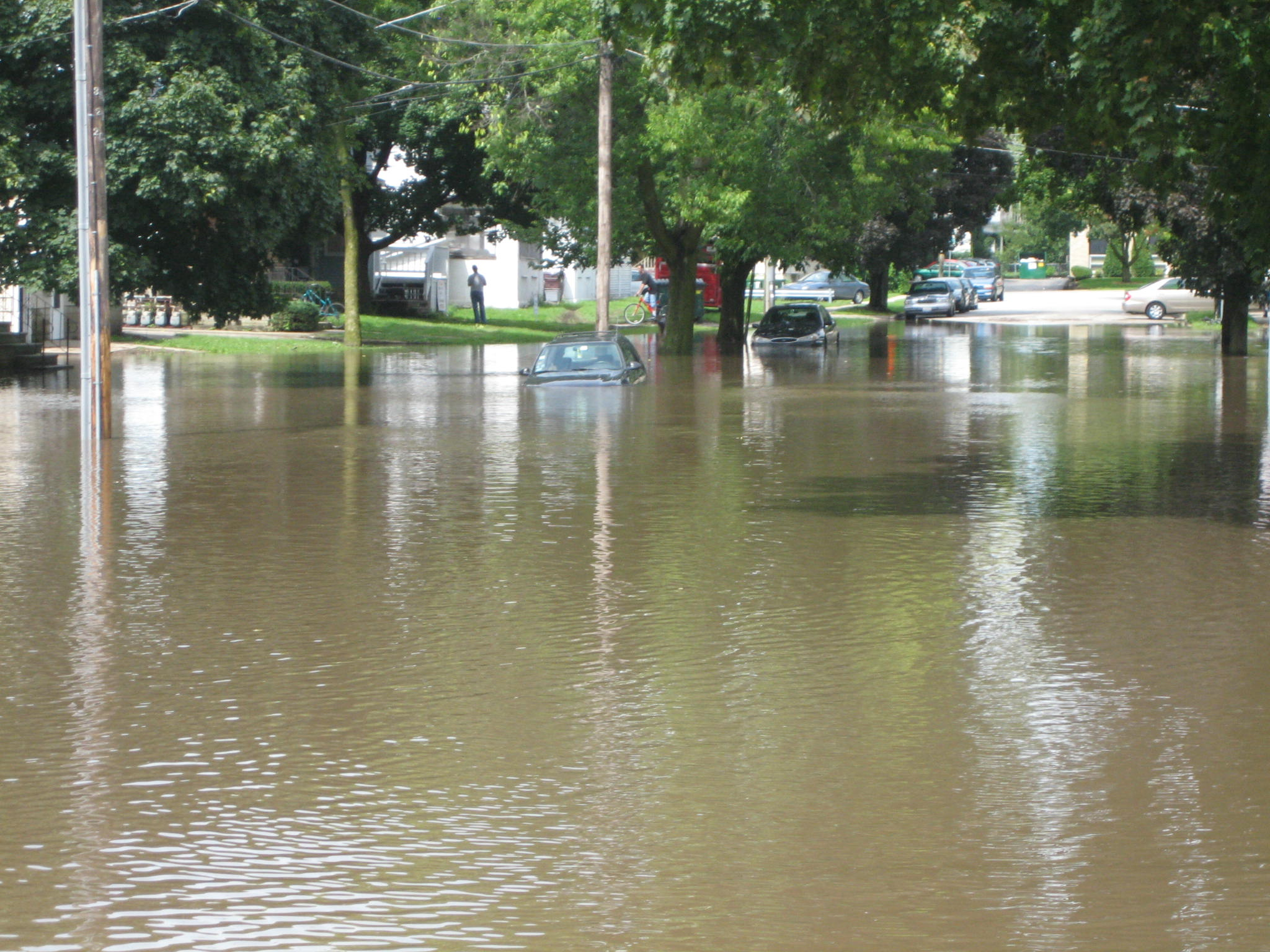
The South Branch Kishwaukee River crested above 15 feet on August 24 submerging parts of DeKalb, Illinois.

Other rivers and streams in the Rock River valley experienced moderate to major flooding as well. The Kishwaukee River at Perryville crested at 17.57 feet (5.36 m), more than five feet above flood stage. The same river also rose above flood stage in Belvidere. After 4.85 inches (123 mm) of rain fell on August 23 and 24 in DeKalb County, at DeKalb, the South Branch Kishwaukee River rose to its highest level since 1983 and its second highest level in recorded history. Numerous roads and bridges were closed, and the cities of DeKalb and Sycamore declared local emergencies, though DeKalb County was not included in Blagojevich's initial disaster declaration. DeKalb County received state disaster area designation from Blagojevich on August 26. In DeKalb and Sycamore, about 600 residents were displaced from their homes, and the DeKalb campus of Northern Illinois University was closed because of the flood.

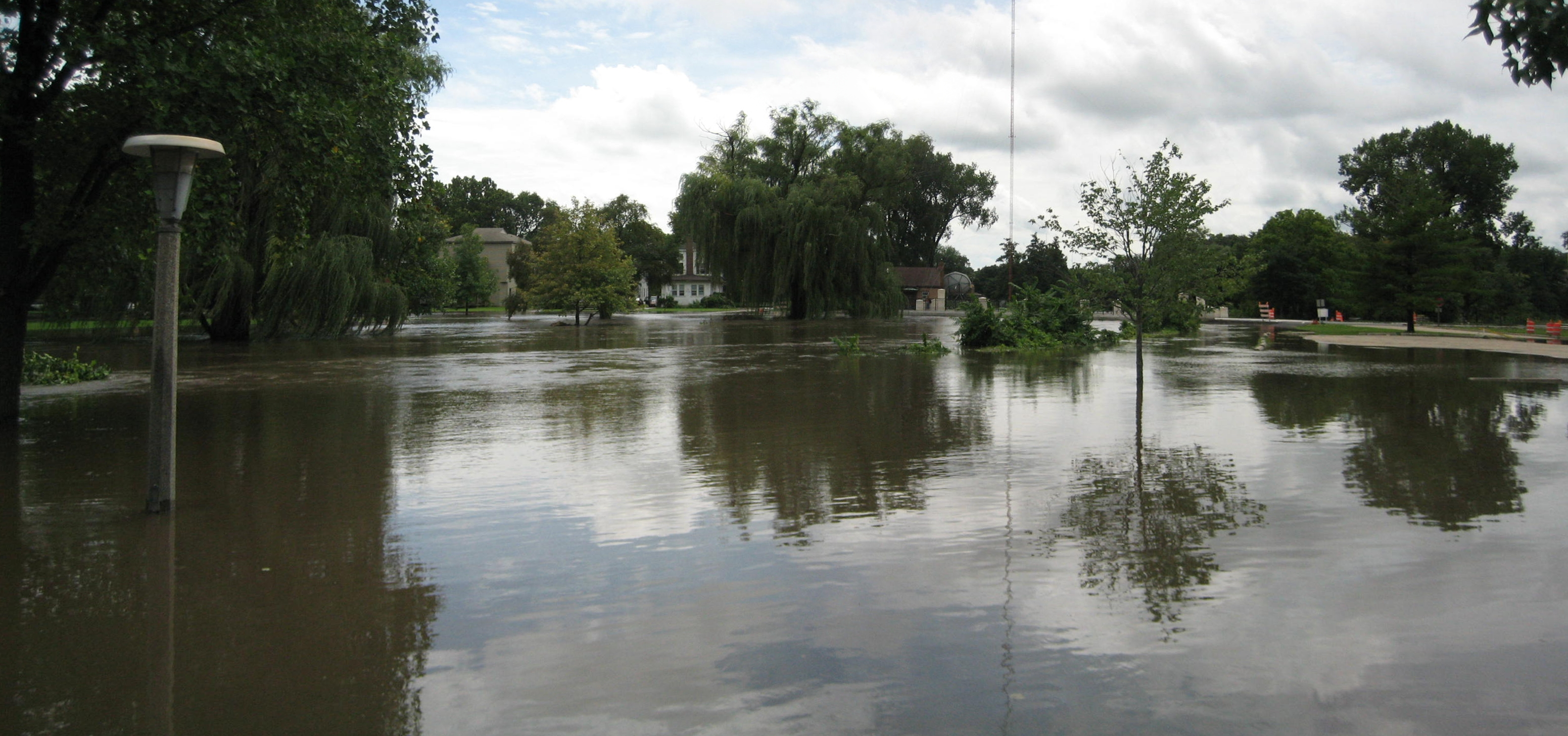
The Kishwaukee River near the Northern Illinois University Art Building, August 24, 2007, DeKalb.

The Fox River at Dayton crested after it rose to more than 17 feet (5 m), over five feet above the river's flood stage. In Plano, Illinois the Fox rose up around the historic Farnsworth House, a modern architecture masterpiece designed by Ludwig Mies van der Rohe. Preservationists used a boat to save the home and its furnishings, which previously had been devastated by high water in 1996. With the boat, preservationists were able to enter the house and move vulnerable furnishings to higher locations within the home. Water rose to within a foot of the Farnsworth House's raised platform, covering the terrace in front of the home, but the river crested before any damage occurred. At Starved Rock State Park, parking lots were closed due to the level of the Illinois River, which stood at 26.5 feet on August 25, 6.5 feet (2 m) above its flood stage.

Governor Blagojevich estimated total flood damages could cost nine Illinois counties and the state more than $22.8 million, and the state requested federal assistance. On September 25, the Federal Emergency Management Agency (FEMA) announced that federal disaster aid was available for the state of Illinois to assist with recovery from the August storms. The disaster aid was made available when President George W. Bush declared DeKalb, Grundy, Kane, LaSalle, Lake, and Will Counties, in northern Illinois, "major disaster" areas. The federal funding made individual assistance available to flood victims in Lake, Will and Grundy Counties, and individual and public assistance available to those in DeKalb, Kane and LaSalle Counties.

== Indiana ==
In Dyer, Indiana, southeast of Chicago, authorities evacuated 70 patients from St. Margaret Mercy Hospital after a waters from a nearby creek started seeping into the hospital. Also in northwest Indiana, a section of Interstate 80/94 (Borman Expressway) was closed on August 24 due to flooding on the roadway. It was reopened on August 27.

== Iowa ==
The Des Moines River near Fort Dodge crested at 4 feet (1.2 m) above flood stage, necessitating the evacuation of three subdivisions. In Ottumwa, storm sewers backed up into the city's water treatment plant, shutting four pumps down and leaving the entire town without adequate drinking water. This was caused by rainfall of over 12 inches (304.8 mm) that fell in southeast Iowa during the night of August 23–24. August 24 damage estimates in nearby Boone County, Iowa reached $150,000 in road damage and an additional $1 million damage to a scenic railroad.

== Minnesota ==
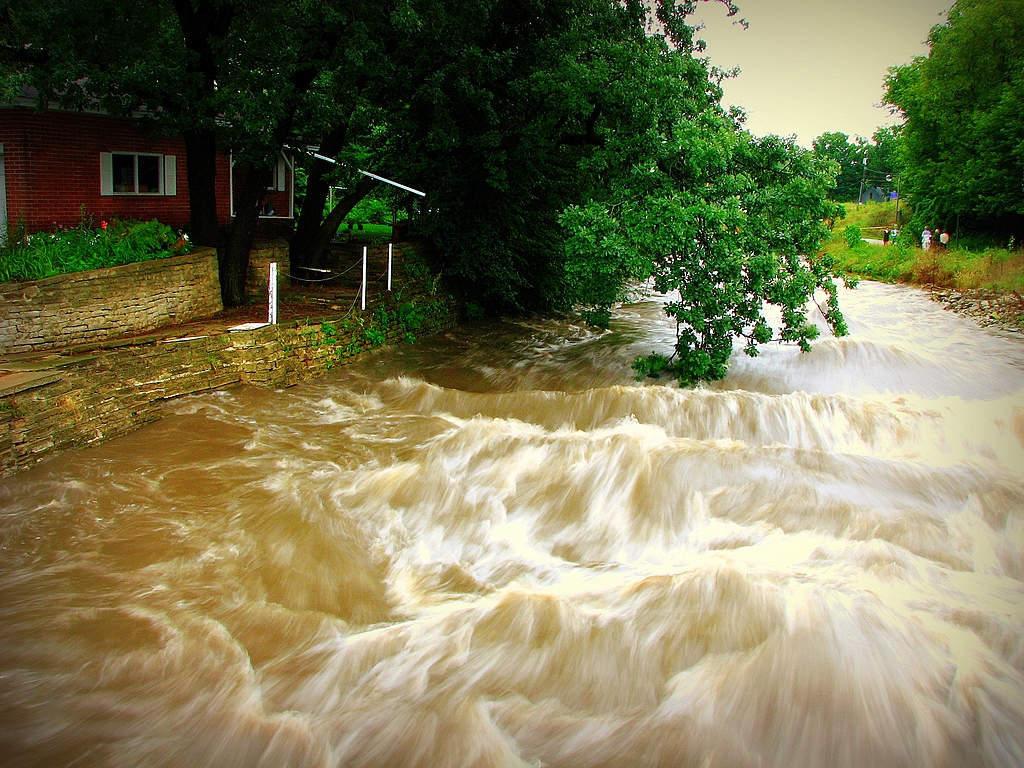
Flash flood in Rochester

A large swath of heavy rain fell across most of southern Minnesota during Saturday, August 18, and Sunday, August 19, with the highest totals in the far southeast counties of the state. Twenty-four-hour rainfall totals of 15.10 inches (384 mm) were recorded in Hokah, which easily broke the old state record of 10.84 inches (275 mm). An unofficial twenty-four-hour total of over 17 inches (432 mm) was recorded near Caledonia. During the entire weekend rainfall event, parts or all of 28 counties in Minnesota received at least 4 inches (102 mm) of rain. The highest total for the entire event was 18.17 inches (462 mm) near La Crescent.

Southeast Minnesota and southwestern Wisconsin are in the Driftless Area, which was not covered by the last glaciation, and therefore is not covered by deep layers of glacial till. The soils therefore are thin and less able to retain water; they lie atop porous rock into and through which surface waters can rapidly drain into the water table. The highly dissected topography, characterized by steep hills and bluffs and deep coulees, gives steep gradients to the drainage and makes streams highly erosive. As the rains far exceeded the absorption rate of 1.5 inches (3.8 cm) in six hours, flash floods rapidly overflowed the water courses and spread across the valley floors. The towns of Stockton, Houston, Elba, Minnesota City, and portions of Winona, on the Mississippi River, were evacuated. Citizens were moved to Saint Mary's University in Winona, Lewiston, and Caledonia, Minnesota. Massive bluffs gave way in Brownsville and several homes were completely washed away. Governor Tim Pawlenty ordered 240 National Guard soldiers to help and declared a state of emergency in six counties. The Minnesota Army National Guard soldiers guarded communities that were cleared out after the flooding early August 19. The Army Corps of Engineers opened up the floodgates on the rising Root River to release some of the water creating pressure on the dike in Houston.

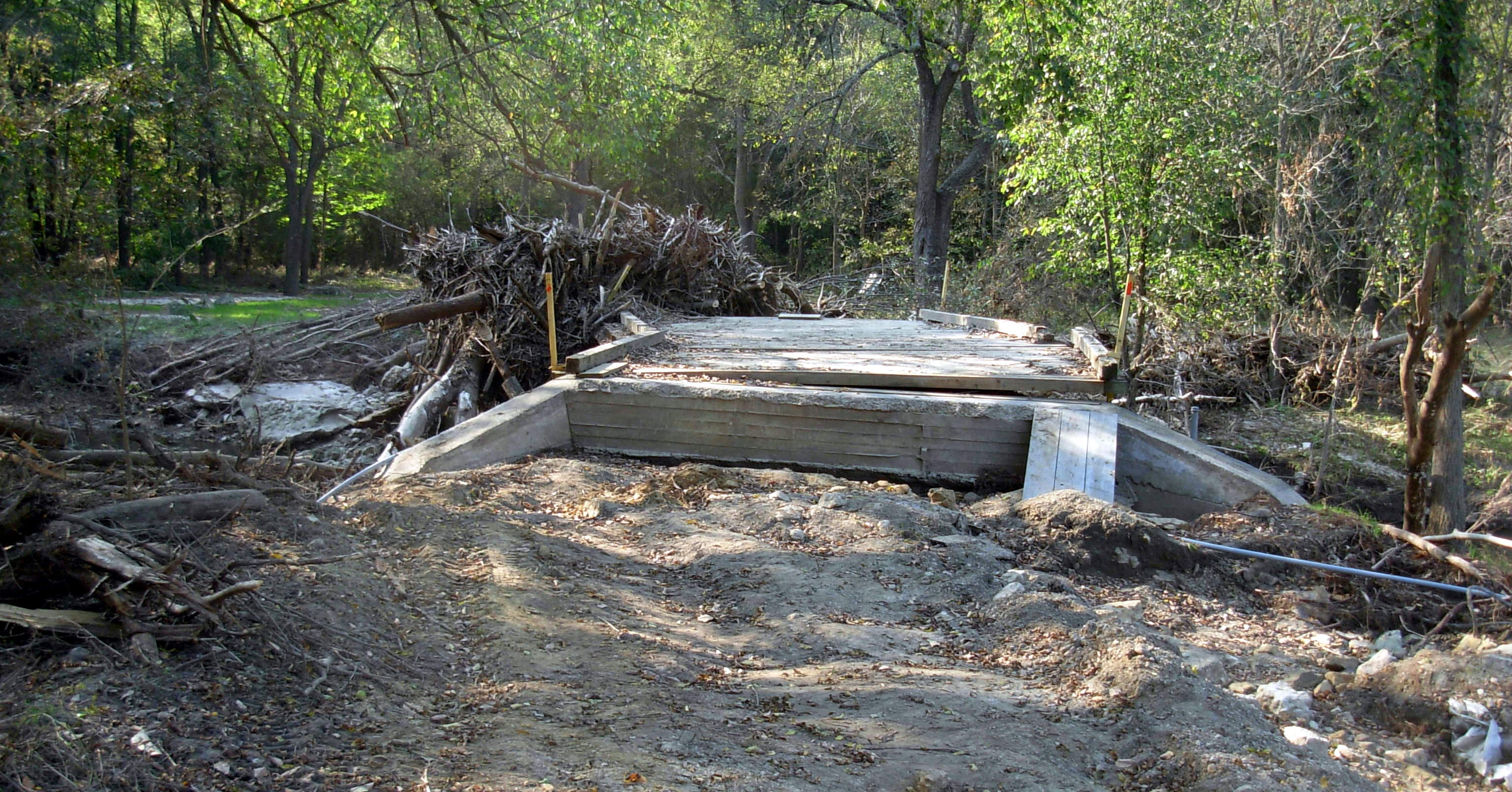
Damaged Whitewater State Park bridge

High flood waters on the Middle Branch of the Whitewater River, which runs through Whitewater State Park, destroyed three bridges and damaged campgrounds, bathhouses, a group dining hall, and water and sewer systems in the park. About 500 campers were staying in Whitewater State Park at the time. The park was closed to the public on August 20, 2007, for an indefinite period of time. E. coli bacteria were found in the Rushford's water supply, and residents were urged not to use it until the city's water system could be flushed.

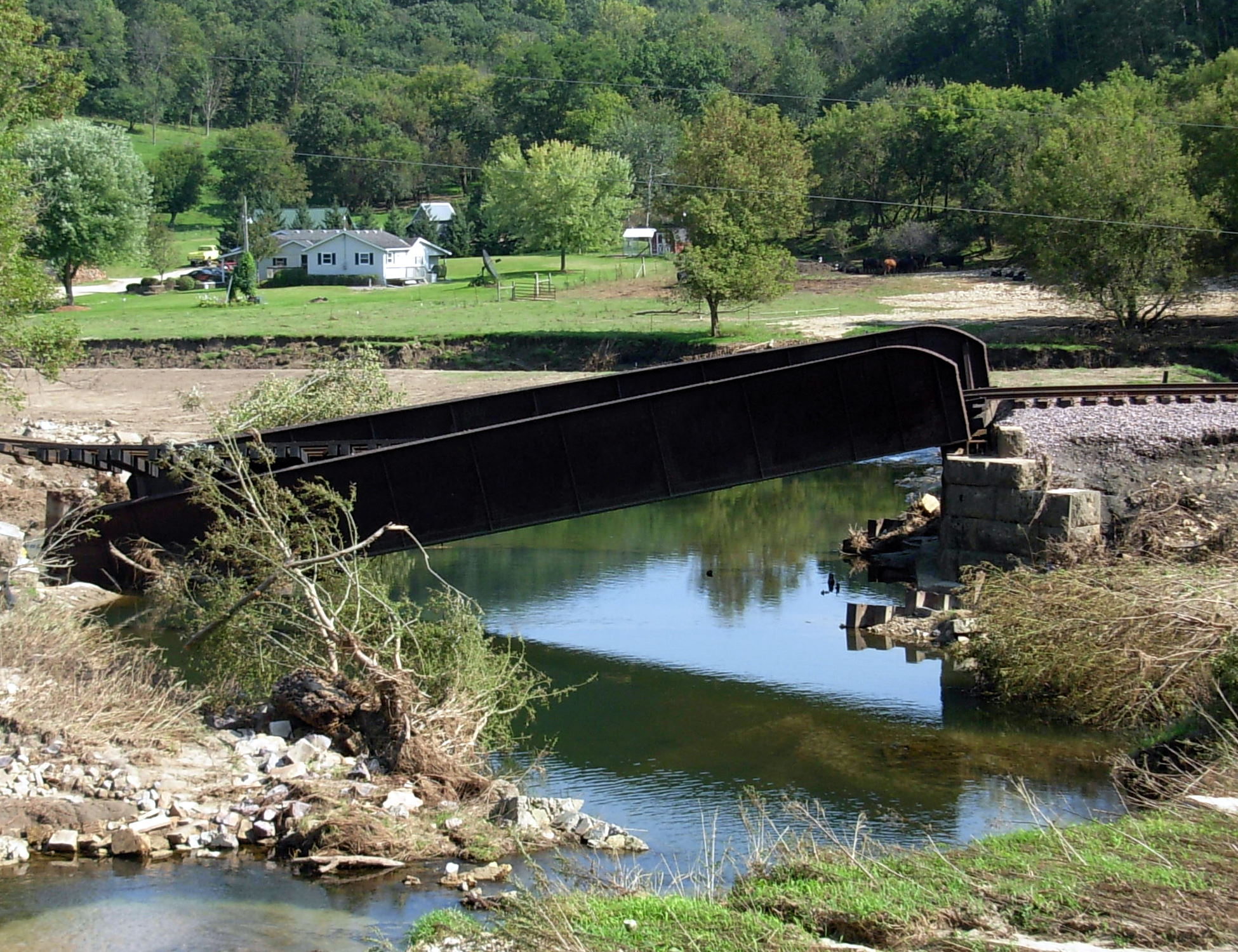
DM&E railroad bridge in Winona County

Amtrak train service between Minneapolis and La Crosse, Wisconsin was shut down for a week because of damage to the tracks. Passengers were bussed between the two until repairs could be made. The passenger rail line resumed service on August 27.

State Senator Sharon Erickson Ropes stated after initial flooding, "This is the worst disaster that's hit southeast Minnesota in a lifetime." Four thousand two hundred homes were damaged or destroyed in the state, and seven deaths were reported. It is estimated that there has been $67 million in damage. Dodge, Fillmore, Houston, Olmsted, Steele, Wabasha, and Winona counties were declared federal disaster areas.

== Ohio ==
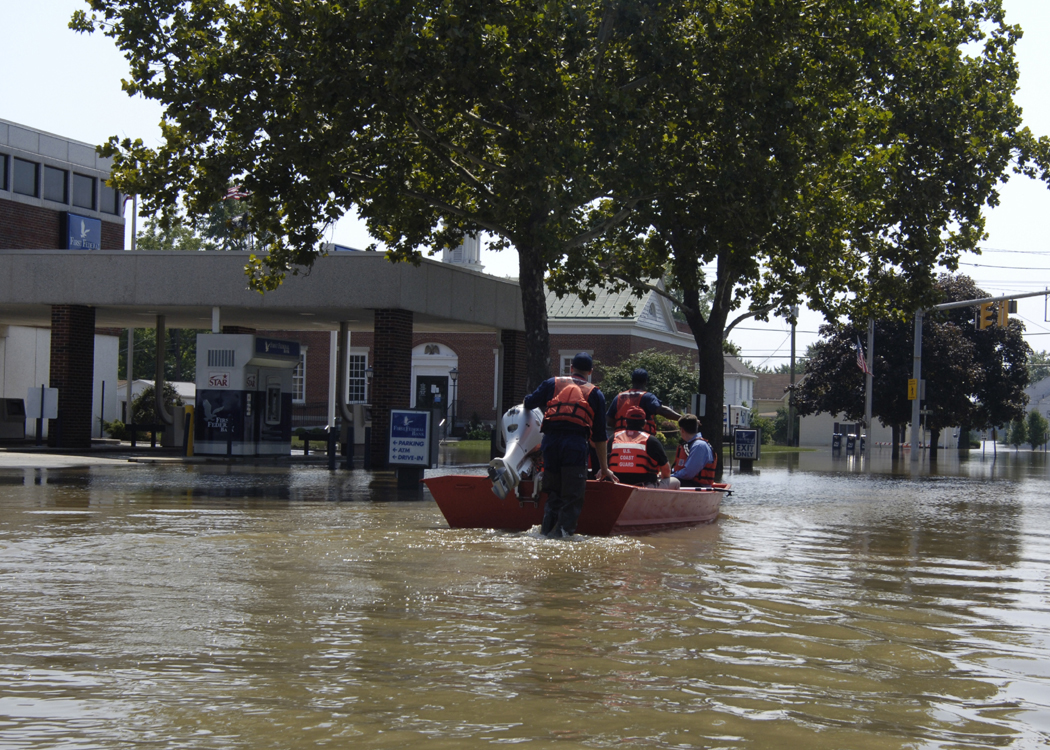
A U.S. Coast Guard boat crew searches for flood victims in need of help in Ottawa, Ohio.

The Blanchard River was 7.5 feet (2 m) above flood level in Findlay, the highest level since 1913. A 92-year-old man drowned trying to get to safety after his car became trapped in floodwater near Findlay, where water poured into the downtown area from the Blanchard and its tributary creeks. One hundred thirty inmates were moved from a Hancock County jail. Bucyrus received 9 inches (229 mm) of rain, and several hundred people were evacuated from their homes in Crawford County. The river also reached 8.7 feet (3 m) above flood level in Ottawa, Ohio. Ottawa's Main Street (U.S Route 224) was fully flooded, as were homes and churches for blocks around. Between Findlay and Ottawa, Route 224 was washed out in several spots. The fire department in Ottawa rescued dozens of people from their deluged homes by boat.

Northwest Ohio's most serious flooding was along the Blanchard, though other rivers, including the Auglaize, Tiffin, Portage, and Sandusky, all experienced some level of flooding. The cities of Bellevue and Shelby also had severe flooding that forced residents from their homes. Allen, Crawford, Hancock, Hardin, Putnam, Richland, Seneca, and Wyandot counties were declared federal disaster areas.

== Wisconsin ==
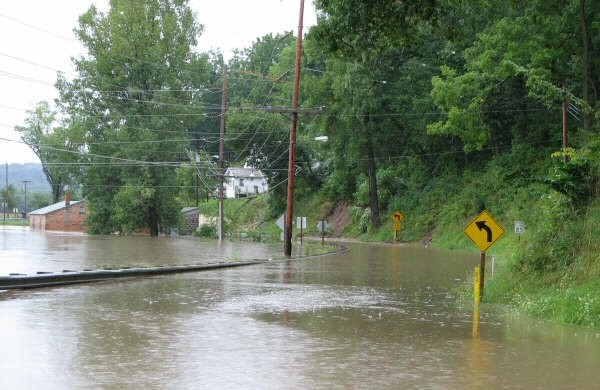
A road is submerged by the Kickapoo River in southwest Wisconsin.

In Wisconsin, Governor Jim Doyle declared a state of emergency on August 20 in three counties in the southwest corner of his state after weekend rains of ten to twelve inches fell. (254–305 mm). More than 200 homes were flooded in the Crawford County communities of Gays Mills and Soldiers Grove, each with about 600 to 640 residents. A mudslide pushed one house onto state Highway 35 in Vernon County. Approximately $48 million in damage was reported in 12 Wisconsin counties. Columbia, Crawford, Dane, Grant, Green, Iowa, Jefferson, Kenosha, La Crosse, Racine, Richland, Rock, Sauk, and Vernon counties were declared federal disaster areas.

In Madison, a mother and daughter waiting for a Madison Metro bus were electrocuted when lightning struck a power line and caused it to fall onto a flooded street on which they were standing, while another child was injured. A passenger on the bus was killed, and the driver was injured, both having been shocked after coming out of the bus to help.

Before this torrential rain and flooding event, much of the state was in a moderate to severe drought that had persisted until mid-August. Although the southern half of the state received abundant precipitation, an upper-level high pressure ridge centered in Quebec caused a cut-off of precipitation to the north, leaving much of northern Wisconsin and Upper Michigan with continued drought conditions.

== See also ==
- Floods in the United States: 2001-present
- List of Minnesota weather records
- Tropical Storm Erin
