= Whitewater State Park =

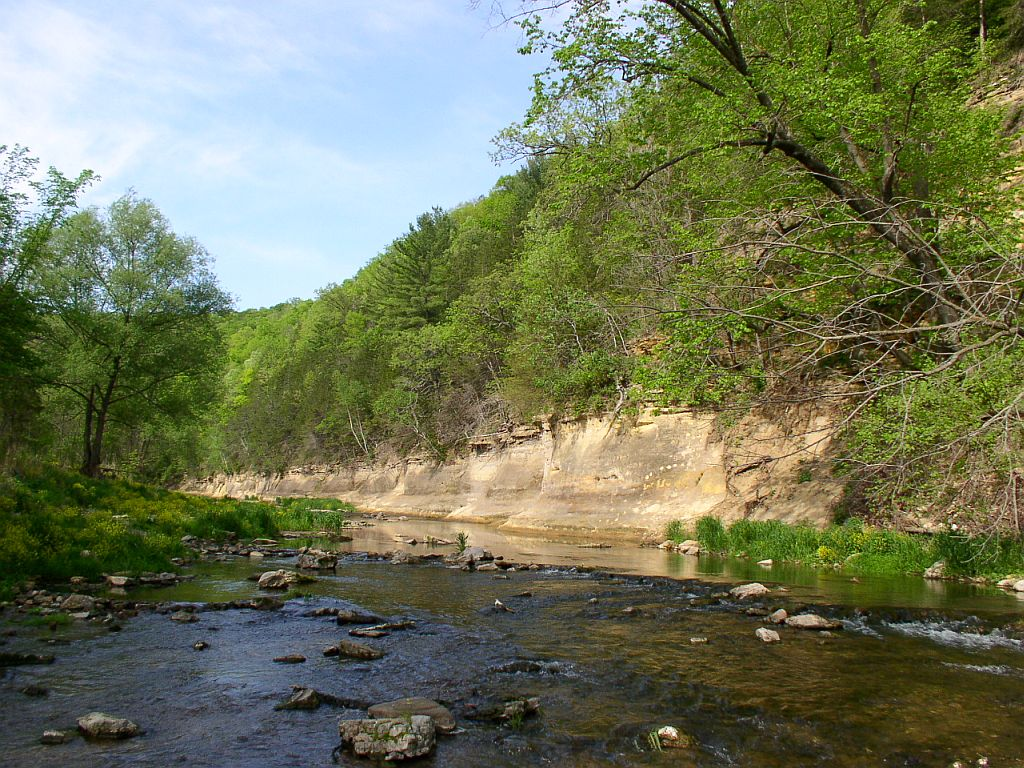
- The Whitewater River in Whitewater State Park

- Location within Minnesota Location within the United States
- Location: Winona, Minnesota, United States
- Coordinates: 44°3′N 92°3′W
- Area: 1,672 acres (6.77 km^{2})
- Elevation: 899 ft (274 m)
- Established: 1919
- Governing body: Minnesota Department of Natural Resources

- Whitewater State Park CCC/WPA/Rustic Style Historic Resources
- U.S. National Register of Historic Places
- U.S. Historic district
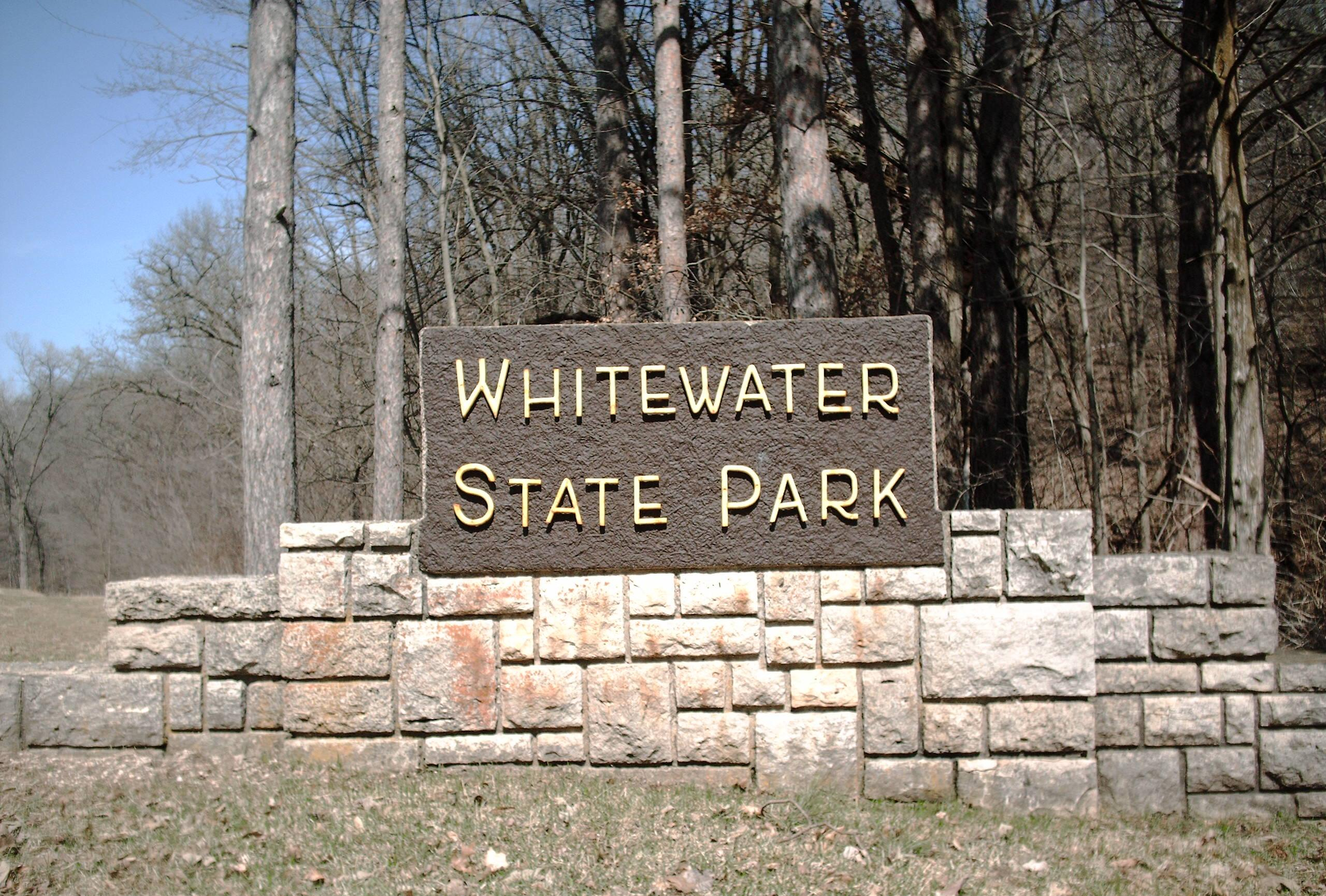
- Sign at the south entrance to the park
- Location: Off Minnesota State Highway 74, Elba Township, Minnesota
- Coordinates: 44°3′15″N 92°2′45″W
- Area: 563 acres (228 ha)
- Built: 1934–41
- Architects: National Park Service, Civilian Conservation Corps, Works Progress Administration
- Architectural style: National Park Service rustic
- MPS: Minnesota State Park CCC/WPA/Rustic Style MPS
- NRHP reference No.: 89001661
- Added to NRHP: October 25, 1989

Whitewater State Park is a state park of Minnesota, United States, preserving a stretch of the Whitewater River surrounded by rocky bluffs. It is located in Winona County in the southeastern blufflands area of the state. The 2,700-acre (11 km^{2}) park features scenic overlooks and trout fishing in the spring-fed Whitewater River and Trout Run Creek. It has about 300,000 visitors annually, and is located 7 miles (11 km) north of St. Charles on Minnesota State Highway 74, which runs through the park.

== Historic structures ==
The park's 1930s facilities are listed on the National Register of Historic Places as the Whitewater State Park CCC/WPA/Rustic Style Historic Resources. The 536-acre (217 ha) historic district includes 29 contributing properties. The district was listed for having state-level significance in the themes of architecture, entertainment/recreation, landscape architecture, and politics/government. It was nominated for its examples of New Deal federal work relief, diverse National Park Service rustic design, and landscape architecture on a challenging site.

== Landforms ==
The park's bedrock is lower Paleozoic sedimentary rocks, with limestone and dolomite especially prevalent near the surface. It is highly dissected, and the Whitewater River has cut deep valleys into the bedrock. It is an area of karst topography.

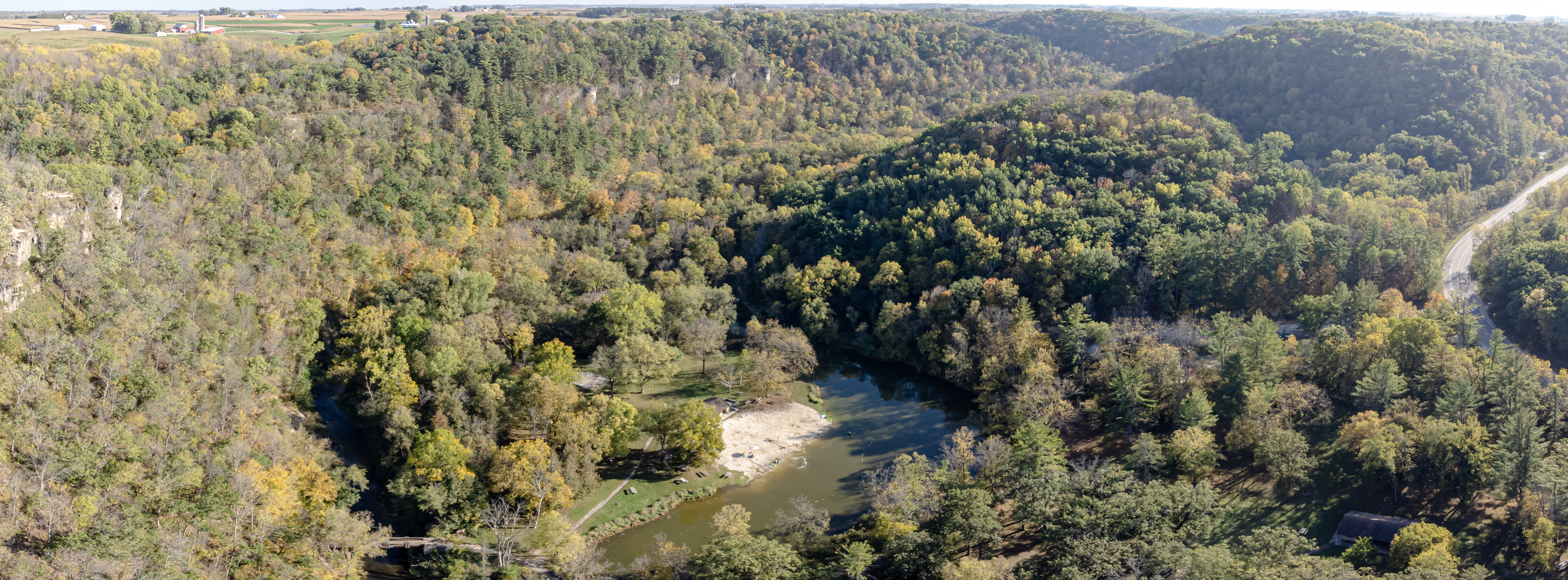
Whitewater State Park

== Lifeforms ==
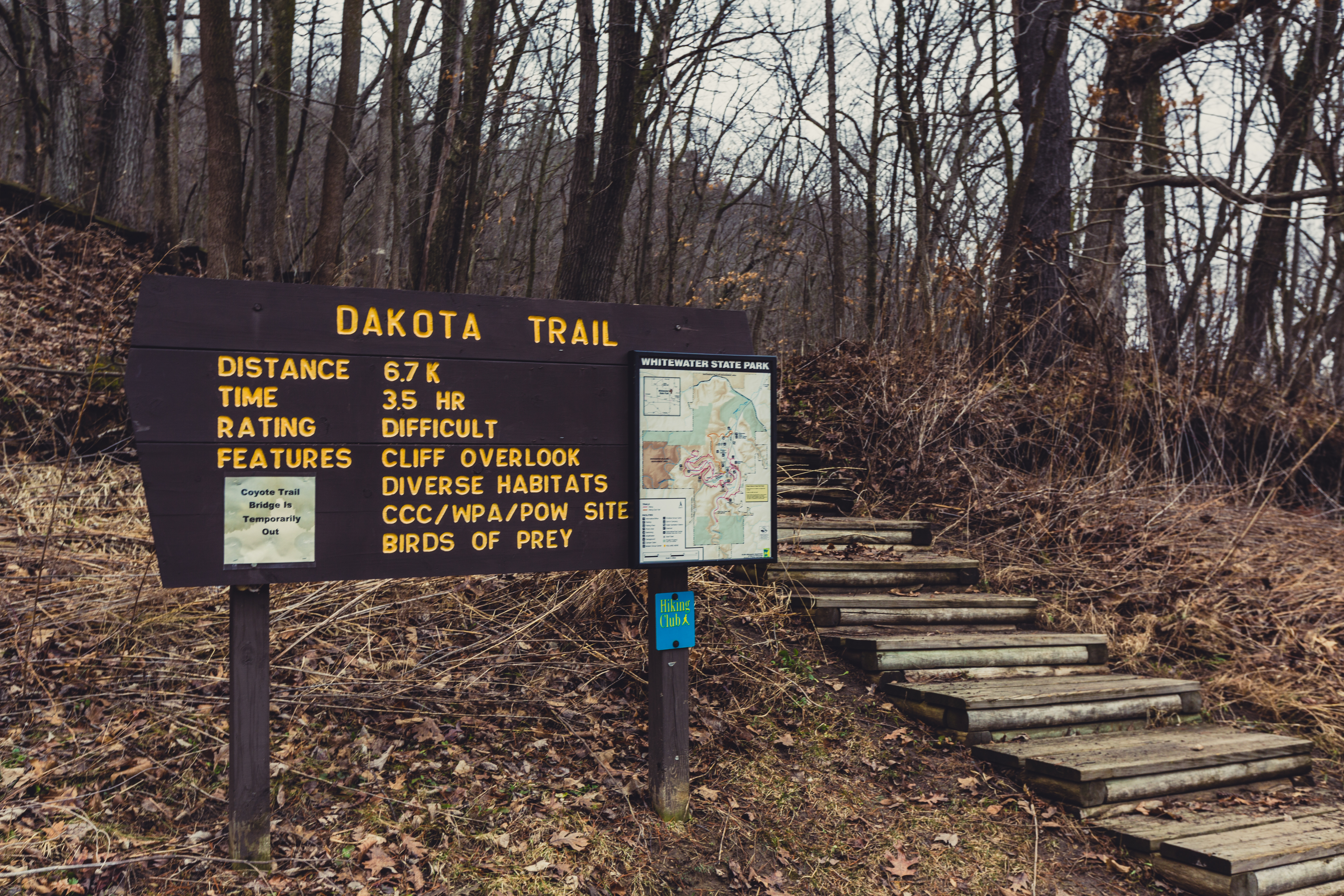
Trail Sign, Whitewater State Park

The park is located where the Rochester Plateau Subsection and the Blufflands Subsection meet, both of which are part of the Paleozoic Plateau section of the Eastern Broadleaf Forest Province.

== 2007 flood ==
The August 18 and 19, 2007 Midwest flooding caused extensive damage to the park. The park is in the Driftless Area, where soils are thin and less able to retain water; they lie atop porous rock into and through which surface waters can rapidly drain into the water table. The steep hills and bluffs and deep coulees give steep gradients to the drainage and makes streams highly erosive. As the rains far exceeded the absorption rate of the soils, flash floods rapidly overflowed the river and spread across the valley floors.

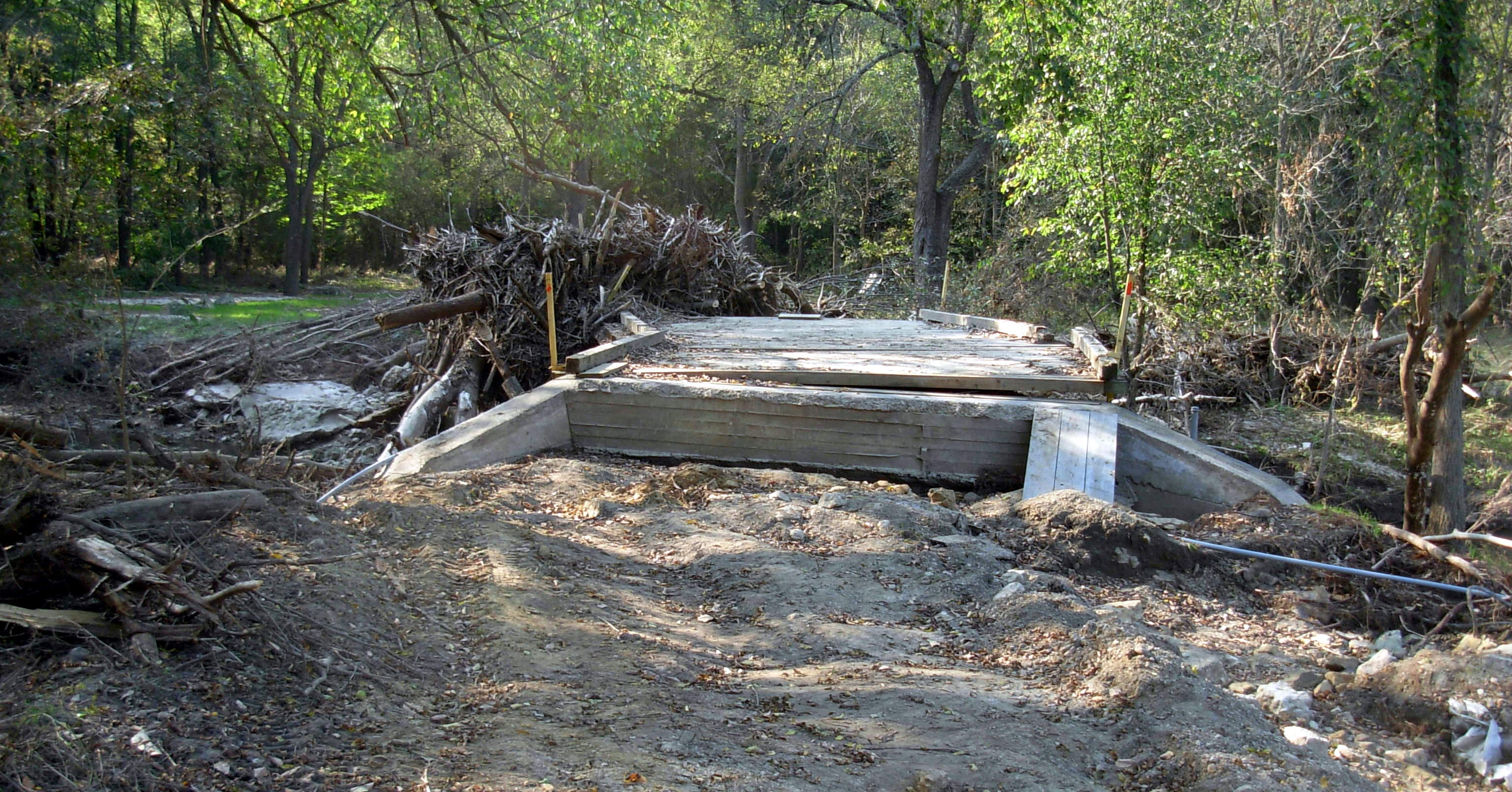
A damaged bridge in 2007

About 500 campers were staying in the park at the time. Three bridges were destroyed, and campgrounds, bathhouses, a group dining hall, and water and sewer systems suffered extensive damage. Damage was in excess of four million dollars, and the park was closed to the public on August 20, 2007, and remained closed the balance of the year. On March 1, 2008 it partially reopened, but many of its amenities still had unrepaired damage.
