= Elba, Minnesota =

City in Minnesota, United States

Elba
- City
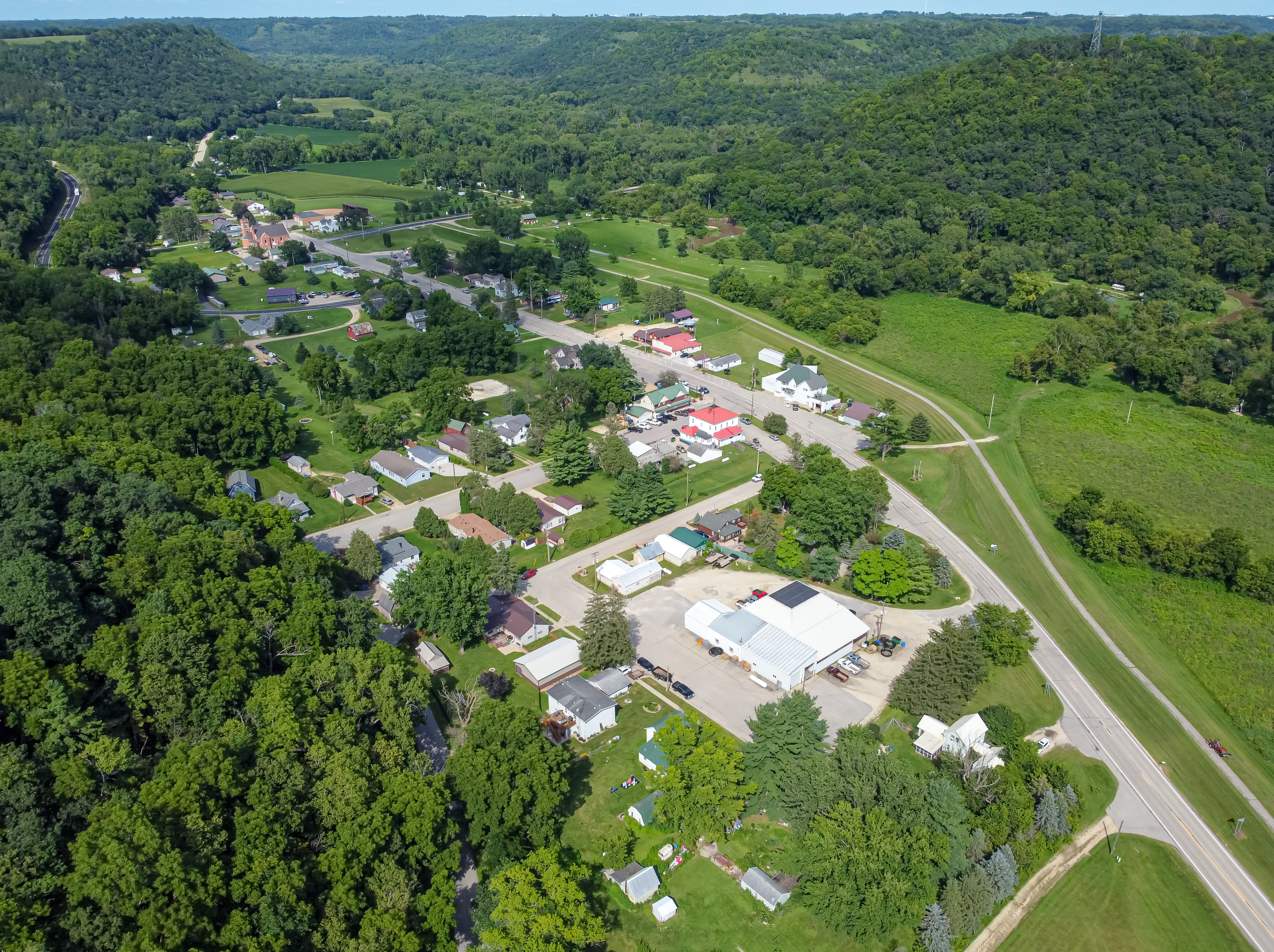
- MN-74 runs through town

- Location of Elba, Minnesota
- Coordinates: 44°05′12″N 92°01′01″W
- Country: United States
- State: Minnesota
- County: Winona

Government
  - Type: Mayor - Council
  - Mayor: Jay Mollert

Area
  - Total: 1.93 sq mi (5.01 km^{2})
  - Land: 1.93 sq mi (5.01 km^{2})
  - Water: 0 sq mi (0.00 km^{2})
- Elevation: 738 ft (225 m)

Population (2020)
  - Total: 129
  - Density: 66.7/sq mi (25.75/km^{2})
- Time zone: UTC-6 (Central (CST))
  - Summer (DST): UTC-5 (CDT)
- ZIP code: 55910
- Area code: 507
- FIPS code: 27-18386
- GNIS feature ID: 2394633

Elba is a city in Winona County, Minnesota, United States. The population was 129 at the 2020 census. It is on Minnesota State Highway 74 just north of Whitewater State Park.

== History ==
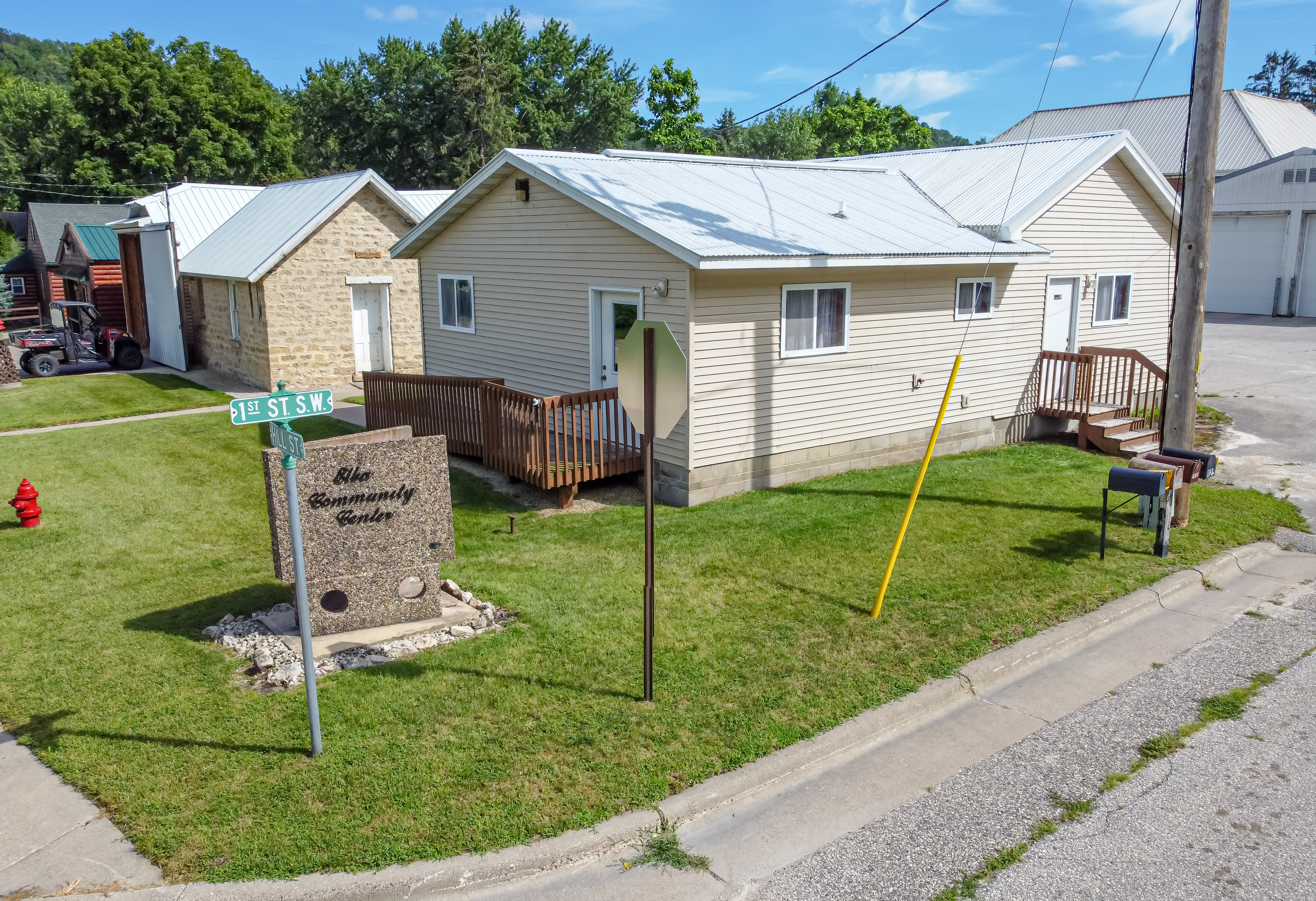
Elba City Hall

Elba was laid out in 1856, and named after the island of Elba. The city was originally built up chiefly by ethnic Germans from Luxembourg. A post office was in operation at Elba from 1858 until 1965.

As a result of the 2007 Midwest flooding, the town was flooded when the dikes holding back the Whitewater River failed on August 18, 2007.

== Geography ==
According to the United States Census Bureau, the city has a total area of 2.04 square miles (5.28 km^{2}), all land.

== Demographics ==
Historical population
Census	Pop.	Note	%±
1880	98		—
1900	198		—
1910	151		−23.7%
1920	172		13.9%
1930	152		−11.6%
1940	159		4.6%
1950	147		−7.5%
1960	152		3.4%
1970	158		3.9%
1980	198		25.3%
1990	220		11.1%
2000	214		−2.7%
2010	152		−29.0%
2020	129		−15.1%
U.S. Decennial Census

=== 2010 census ===
As of the census of 2010, there were 152 people, 70 households, and 44 families living in the city. The population density was 74.5 inhabitants per square mile (28.8/km^{2}). There were 76 housing units at an average density of 37.3 per square mile (14.4/km^{2}). The racial makeup of the city was 98.7% White and 1.3% from other races. Hispanic or Latino of any race were 3.3% of the population.

There were 70 households, of which 25.7% had children under the age of 18 living with them, 45.7% were married couples living together, 11.4% had a female householder with no husband present, 5.7% had a male householder with no wife present, and 37.1% were non-families. 32.9% of all households were made up of individuals, and 11.5% had someone living alone who was 65 years of age or older. The average household size was 2.17 and the average family size was 2.64.

The median age in the city was 45.3 years. 19.1% of residents were under the age of 18; 8.4% were between the ages of 18 and 24; 21.7% were from 25 to 44; 34.3% were from 45 to 64; and 16.4% were 65 years of age or older. The gender makeup of the city was 57.9% male and 42.1% female.

=== 2000 census ===
As of the census of 2000, there were 214 people, 72 households, and 58 families living in the city. The population density was 105.0 inhabitants per square mile (40.5/km^{2}). There were 77 housing units at an average density of 37.8 per square mile (14.6/km^{2}). The racial makeup of the city was 100.00% White. Hispanic or Latino of any race were 1.40% of the population.

There were 72 households, out of which 51.4% had children under the age of 18 living with them, 58.3% were married couples living together, 6.9% had a female householder with no husband present, and 19.4% were non-families. 16.7% of all households were made up of individuals, and 12.5% had someone living alone who was 65 years of age or older. The average household size was 2.97 and the average family size was 3.28.

In the city, the population was spread out, with 35.5% under the age of 18, 7.0% from 18 to 24, 30.4% from 25 to 44, 18.2% from 45 to 64, and 8.9% who were 65 years of age or older. The median age was 31 years. For every 100 females, there were 107.8 males. For every 100 females age 18 and over, there were 102.9 males.

The median income for a household in the city was $38,750, and the median income for a family was $41,042. Males had a median income of $30,156 versus $22,500 for females. The per capita income for the city was $14,398. About 3.5% of families and 6.2% of the population were below the poverty line, including 5.9% of those under the age of eighteen and 8.7% of those 65 or over.

== Education ==
Elba is part of the St. Charles Public Schools.
