= Minneiska, Minnesota =

City in Minnesota, United States

- City
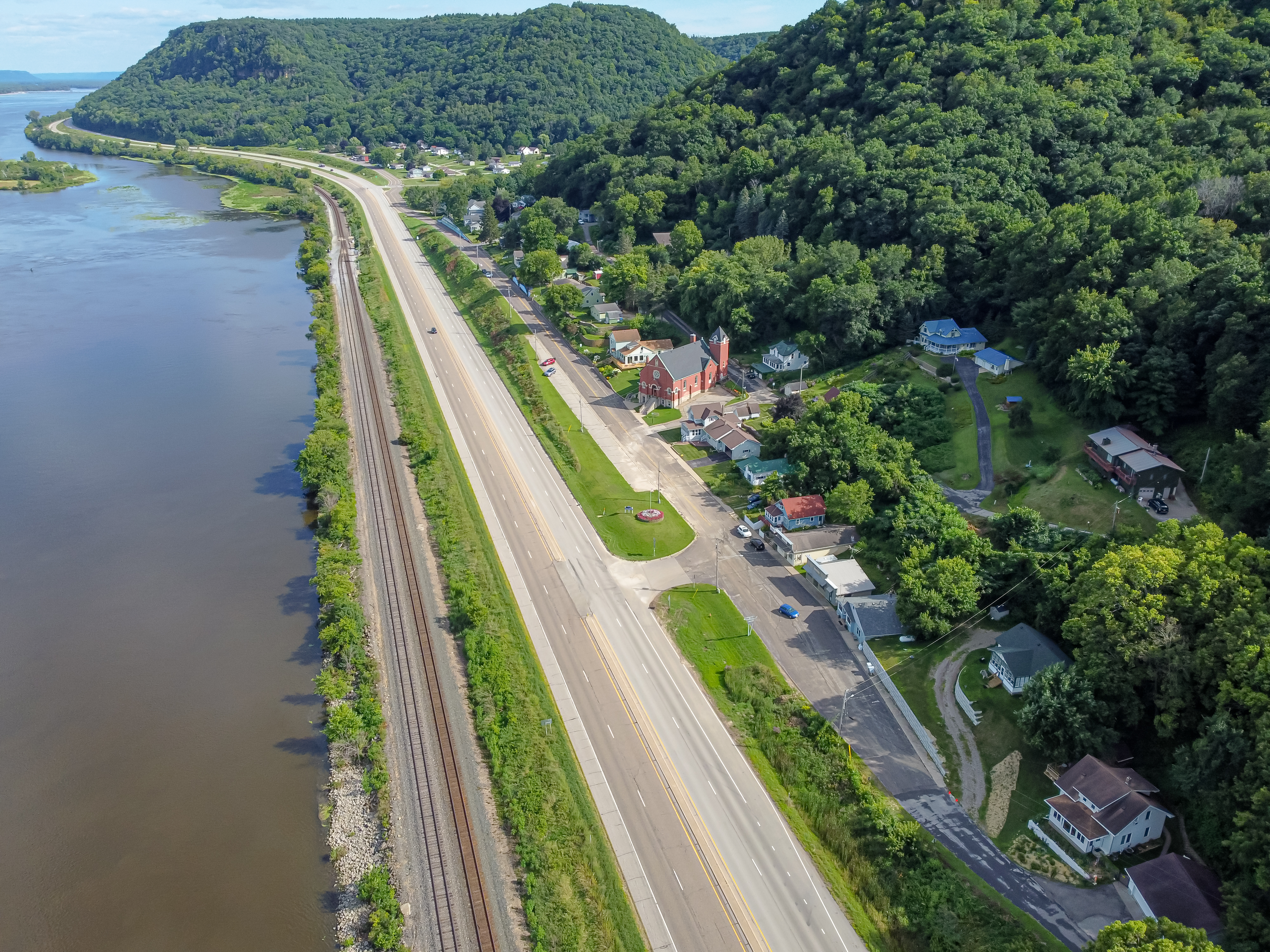
- Minneiska is along U.S. Highway 61

- Location of Minneiska, Minnesota
- Coordinates: 44°11′40″N 91°52′12″W
- Country: United States
- State: Minnesota
- Counties: Winona, Wabasha
- Platted: 1854
- Incorporated: March 4, 1857

Government
  - Mayor: Mark Tibor

Area
  - Total: 0.985 sq mi (2.550 km^{2})
  - Land: 0.515 sq mi (1.333 km^{2})
  - Water: 0.470 sq mi (1.218 km^{2})
- Elevation: 741 ft (226 m)

Population (2020)
  - Total: 97
  - Estimate (2022): 97
  - Density: 188.4/sq mi (72.76/km^{2})
- Time zone: UTC–6 (Central (CST))
  - Summer (DST): UTC–5 (CDT)
- ZIP Code: 55910
- Area code: 507
- FIPS code: 27-43036
- GNIS feature ID: 2395346
- Sales tax: 7.375%
- Website: minneiska-mn.com

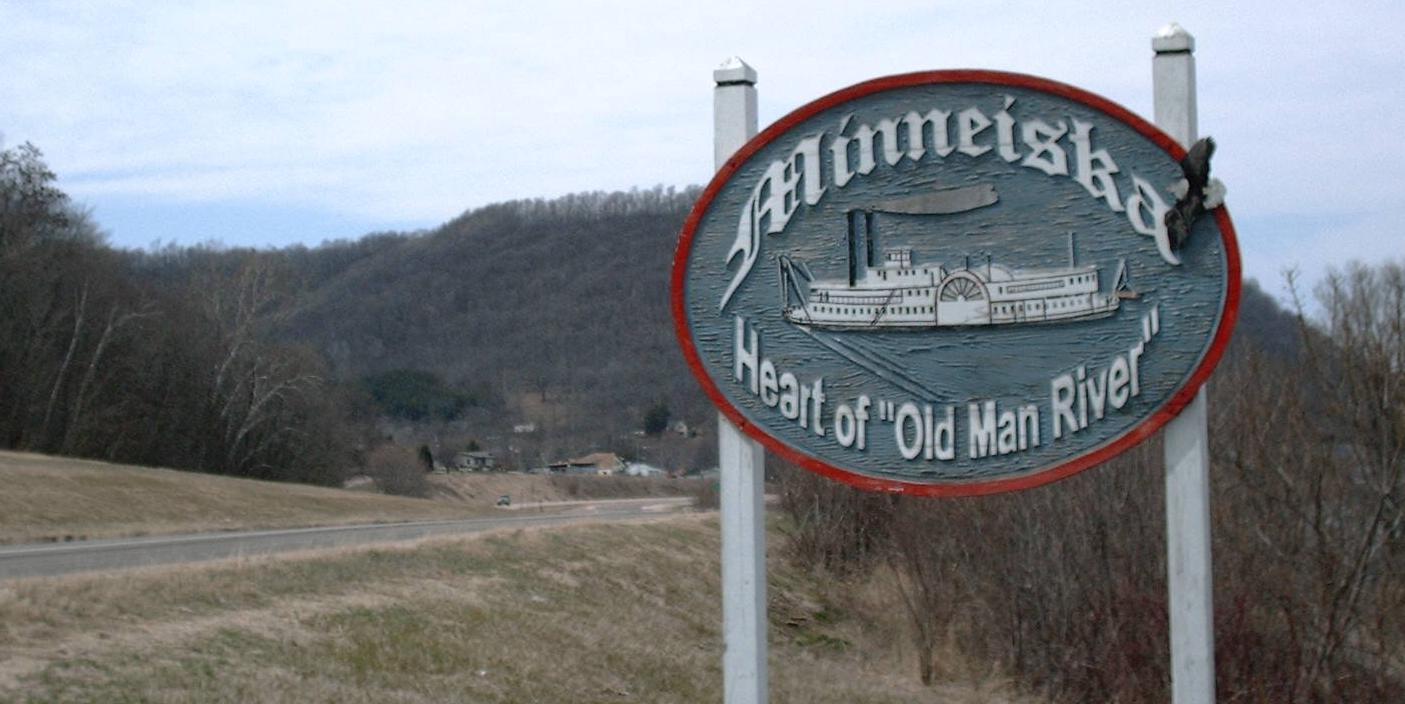
Minneiska, Minnesota welcome sign

Minneiska is a city in Wabasha and Winona counties in the U.S. state of Minnesota. The population was 97 at the 2020 census.

== History ==
Minneiska was platted in 1854, and given the native Dakota-language name for the Whitewater River. A post office was established at Minneiska in 1856, and remained in operation until 1985.

== Geography ==
According to the United States Census Bureau, the city has a total area of 0.980 square miles (2.54 km^{2}); 0.515 square miles (1.33 km^{2}) is land and 0.470 square miles (1.22 km^{2}) is water.

U.S. Highway 61 and Winona County Road 25 are main routes in the community.

== Demographics ==
Historical population
| Census | Pop. | Note | %± |
|---|---|---|---|
| 1870 | 217 | | — |
| 1890 | 325 | | — |
| 1900 | 372 | | 14.5% |
| 1910 | 395 | | 6.2% |
| 1920 | 208 | | −47.3% |
| 1930 | 192 | | −7.7% |
| 1940 | 187 | | −2.6% |
| 1950 | 134 | | −28.3% |
| 1960 | 110 | | −17.9% |
| 1970 | 80 | | −27.3% |
| 1980 | 132 | | 65.0% |
| 1990 | 127 | | −3.8% |
| 2000 | 116 | | −8.7% |
| 2010 | 111 | | −4.3% |
| 2020 | 97 | | −12.6% |
| 2022 (est.) | 97 | | 0.0% |
U.S. Decennial Census; 2020 Census

=== 2010 census ===
As of the 2010 census, there were 111 people, 57 households, and 39 families living in the city. The population density was 213.5 inhabitants per square mile (82.4/km^{2}). There were 62 housing units at an average density of 119.2 per square mile (46.0/km^{2}). The racial makeup of the city was 98.2% White, 0.9% Asian, and 0.9% from two or more races. Hispanic or Latino of any race were 0.9% of the population.

There were 57 households, of which 14.0% had children under the age of 18 living with them, 59.6% were married couples living together, 3.5% had a female householder with no husband present, 5.3% had a male householder with no wife present, and 31.6% were non-families. 26.3% of all households were made up of individuals, and 3.6% had someone living alone who was 65 years of age or older. The average household size was 1.95 and the average family size was 2.26.

The median age in the city was 53.9 years. 9.9% of residents were under the age of 18; 1.8% were between the ages of 18 and 24; 15.3% were from 25 to 44; 54% were from 45 to 64; and 18.9% were 65 years of age or older. The gender makeup of the city was 55.9% male and 44.1% female.

=== 2000 census ===
As of the 2000 census, there were 116 people, 51 households, and 42 families living in the city. The population density was 204.6 inhabitants per square mile (79.0/km^{2}). There were 55 housing units at an average density of 97.0 per square mile (37.5/km^{2}). The racial makeup of the city was 98.28% White, 0.86% Asian, 0.86% from other races.

There were 51 households, out of which 21.6% had children under the age of 18 living with them, 74.5% were married couples living together, and 17.6% were non-families. 15.7% of all households were made up of individuals, and 5.9% had someone living alone who was 65 years of age or older. The average household size was 2.27 and the average family size was 2.50.

In the city, the population was spread out, with 15.5% under the age of 18, 5.2% from 18 to 24, 23.3% from 25 to 44, 37.1% from 45 to 64, and 19.0% who were 65 years of age or older. The median age was 48 years. For every 100 females, there were 114.8 males. For every 100 females age 18 and over, there were 117.8 males.

The median income for a household in the city was $43,750, and the median income for a family was $53,750. Males had a median income of $31,875 versus $19,583 for females. The per capita income for the city was $39,223. There were no families and 1.8% of the population living below the poverty line, including no under eighteens and none of those over 64.

== Transportation ==
Amtrak’s Empire Builder, which operates between Seattle/Portland and Chicago, passes through the town on CPKC tracks, but makes no stop. The nearest station is located in Winona, 16 miles (26 km) to the south.
