= Whitewater River (Minnesota) =

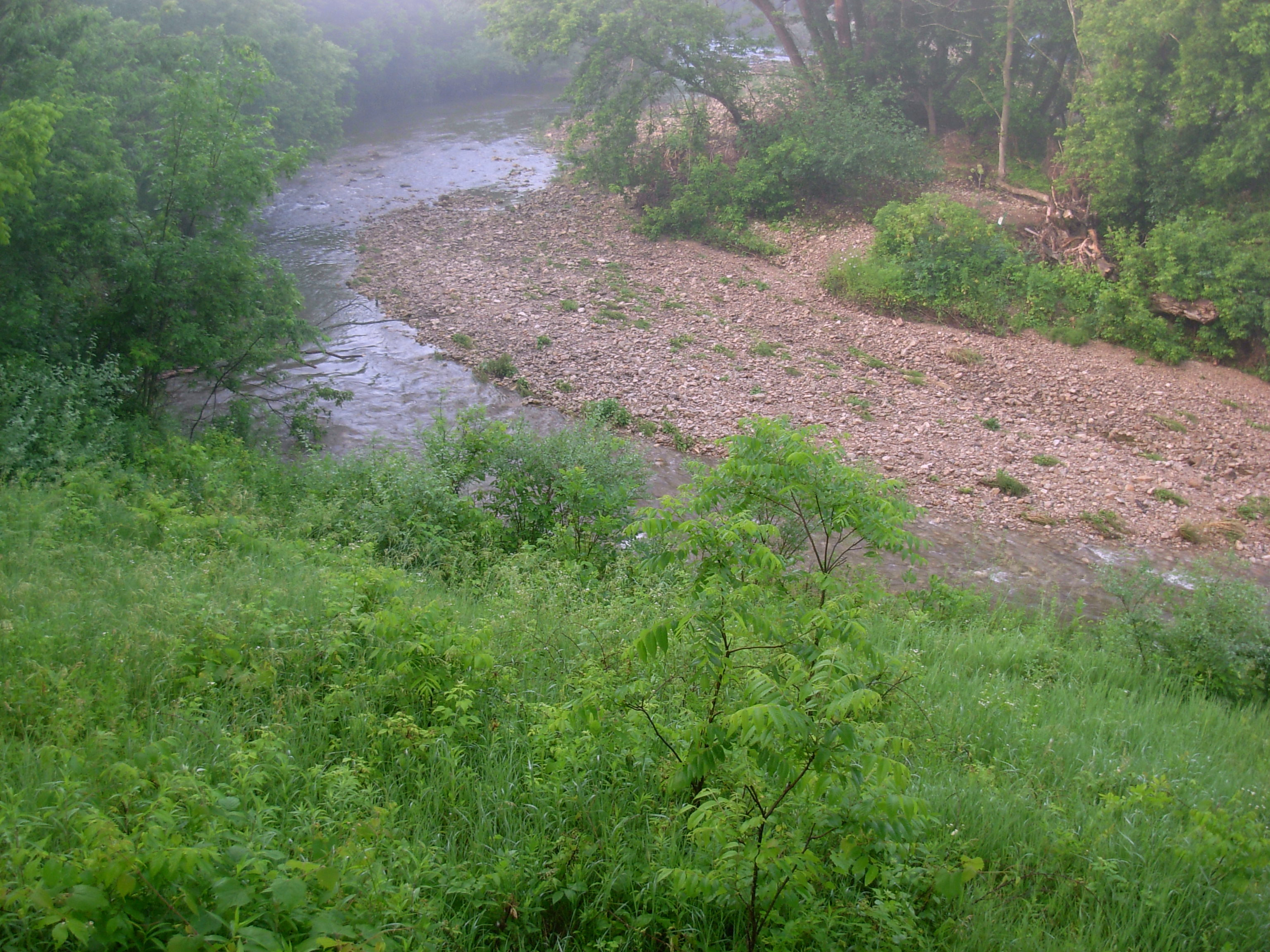
- The Whitewater River in Whitewater State Park

- Mouth of the Whitewater River

Location
- Country: United States
- State: Minnesota
- County: Wabasha, Olmsted, Winona

Physical characteristics
- Source
  - location: Elba, Minnesota
  - coordinates: 44.0846859°N 92.0218277°W
- Mouth
  - location: Weaver, Minnesota
  - coordinates: 44.2091°N 91.9032°W
- Length: 16.6 m (54 ft)
- Discharge
  - location: Beaver, Minnesota
  - average: 133 cu/ft. per sec

Basin features
- River system: Upper Mississippi River
- Tributaries
  - left: Beaver Creek, North Fork Whitewater River
  - right: Middle Fork Whitewater River, South Fork Whitewater River, Trout Valley Creek

The Whitewater River is a 16.6-mile-long (26.7 km) tributary of the Upper Mississippi River which flows through the Driftless Area of Minnesota, reaching its mouth in Wabasha County at the community of Weaver opposite Buffalo, Wisconsin. The nearest towns are Altura, Saint Charles, and Elba. The region hosts endangered native dry oak savannas, semiforested areas that seem to have been dependent on fire for their well-being.

The main stem of the Whitewater River is formed by the confluence of the North Fork Whitewater River and Middle Fork Whitewater River at Elba, and is joined by the South Fork Whitewater River, just downstream. The North Fork flows through Wabasha, Olmsted, and Winona counties, with a "channel length of 47 km" (c. 30 miles). The upper branches of the Whitewater River system including the portion that flows through Whitewater State Park are designated trout streams. Native brook, wild brown and occasionally stocked rainbow trout populate the streams.

The state maintains Whitewater State Park on the upper reach of the main stem, on the Middle Fork and on Trout Run Creek. Crystal Springs Fish Hatchery is located on the lower portion of the South Fork.

Whitewater River is the English translation of the native Sioux language name.

At Beaver, Minnesota, the river had an average discharge of 133 cubic feet per second between 1940 and 1957.

== Conservation and restoration ==
In the 1990s the Minnesota Department of Natural Resources restored nearly 5 miles (8 km) of the river (including a straight channel dug in the 1950s) to a more natural, meandering form. Designed to allow the river to access its floodplain, the restored section is supposed to disperse high water levels over a relatively wide area and reduce shoreline erosion.

== Floods ==
The year 1938 saw major flooding and sediment deposition along the river.

As a result of the 2007 Midwest flooding, the river overtopped its dikes, flooding the town of Elba on August 18, 2007.
