= Centerville, Winona County, Minnesota =

Unincorporated community in Minnesota, United States

Centerville
- Unincorporated community
- Location within Minnesota Location within the United States
- Coordinates: 43°56′35″N 91°38′09″W
- Country: United States
- State: Minnesota
- County: Winona County
- Township: Wilson Township
- Elevation: 1,316 ft (401 m)
- Time zone: UTC-6 (Central (CST))
  - Summer (DST): UTC-5 (CDT)
- ZIP code: 55987
- Area code: 507
- GNIS feature ID: 641052

Centerville is an unincorporated community in Wilson Township, Winona County, Minnesota, United States.

The community is located along Winona County Road 12, near its junction with Blackberry Road.

State Highways 43 (MN 43) and 76 (MN 76); and Interstate 90 are also nearby.

Centerville is located within ZIP code 55987, based in Winona. Nearby places include Winona, Wilson, Witoka, and Ridgeway.
