= Wyattville, Minnesota =

Unincorporated community in Minnesota, United States

Wyattville
- Unincorporated community
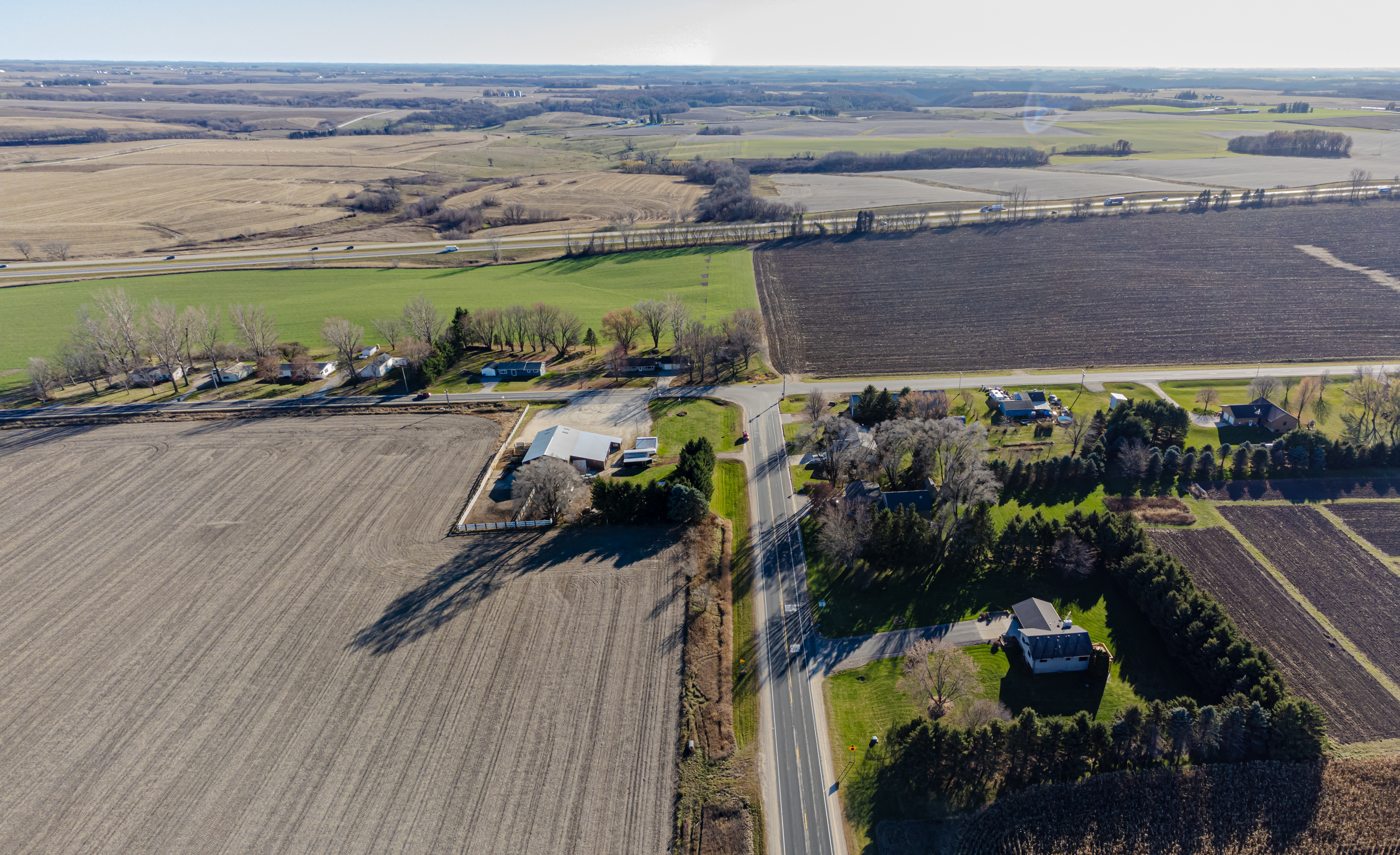
- I-90 in the background

- Location within Minnesota Location within the United States
- Coordinates: 43°56′27″N 91°47′25″W
- Country: United States
- State: Minnesota
- County: Winona County
- Township: Warren Township
- Elevation: 1,247 ft (380 m)
- Time zone: UTC-6 (Central (CST))
  - Summer (DST): UTC-5 (CDT)
- ZIP code: 55952
- Area code: 507
- GNIS feature ID: 655024

Wyattville is an unincorporated community in Warren Township, Winona County, Minnesota, United States.

The community is located near the junction of Winona County Roads 12 and 25.

Interstate 90 and State Highway 43 (MN 43) are both nearby. Wyattville had a post office from 1858 to 1902.

Nearby places include Lewiston, Wilson, Winona, and Rushford.
