= Latsch Island =

Island of the Mississippi River

Nickname: Wolf Spider Island
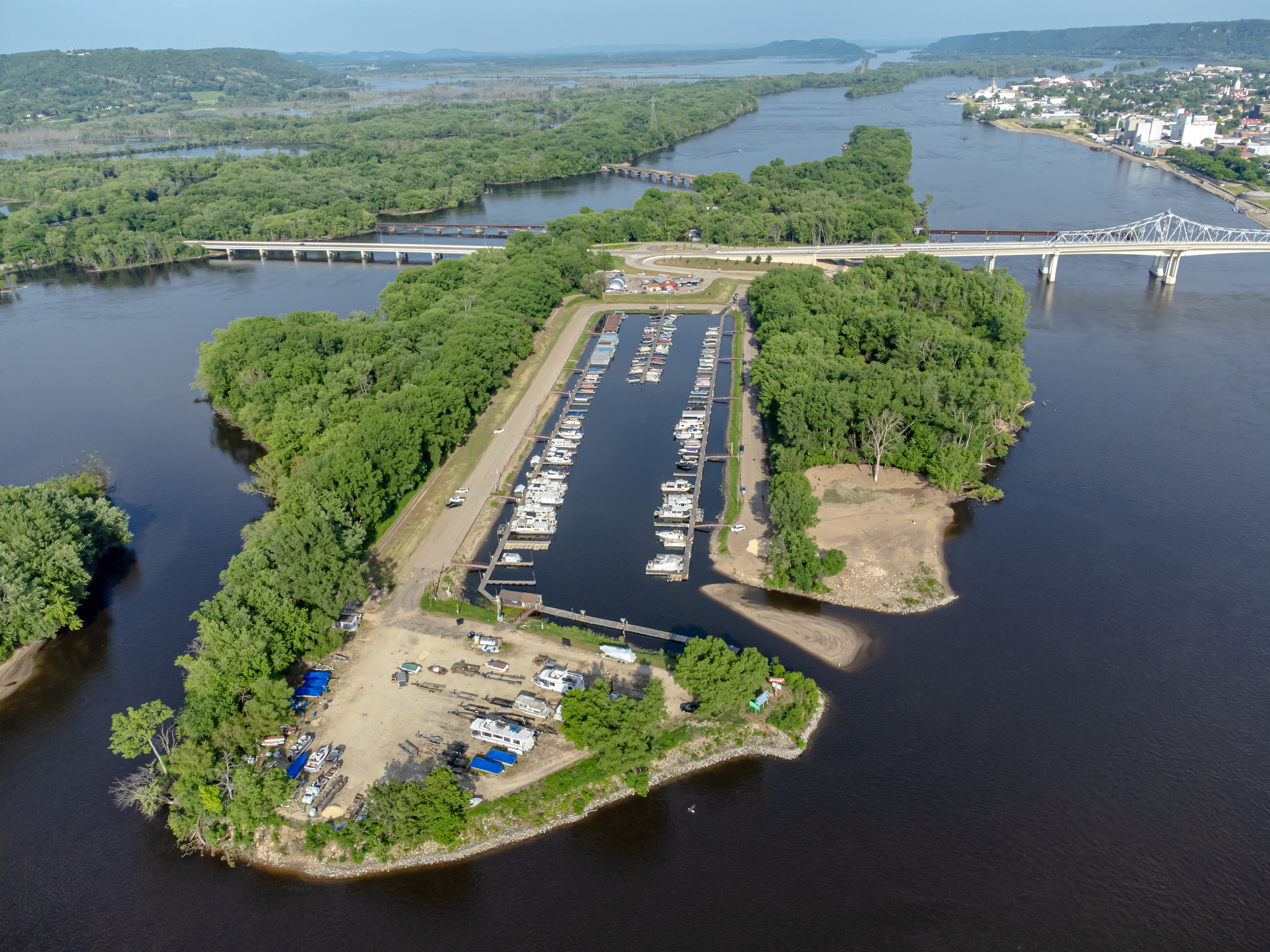
- Etymology: Official: John A. Latsch, local 20th century Businessman; Nickname: Wolf Spider

Geography
- Adjacent to: Mississippi River

Administration
- United States
- State: Minnesota
- City: Winona

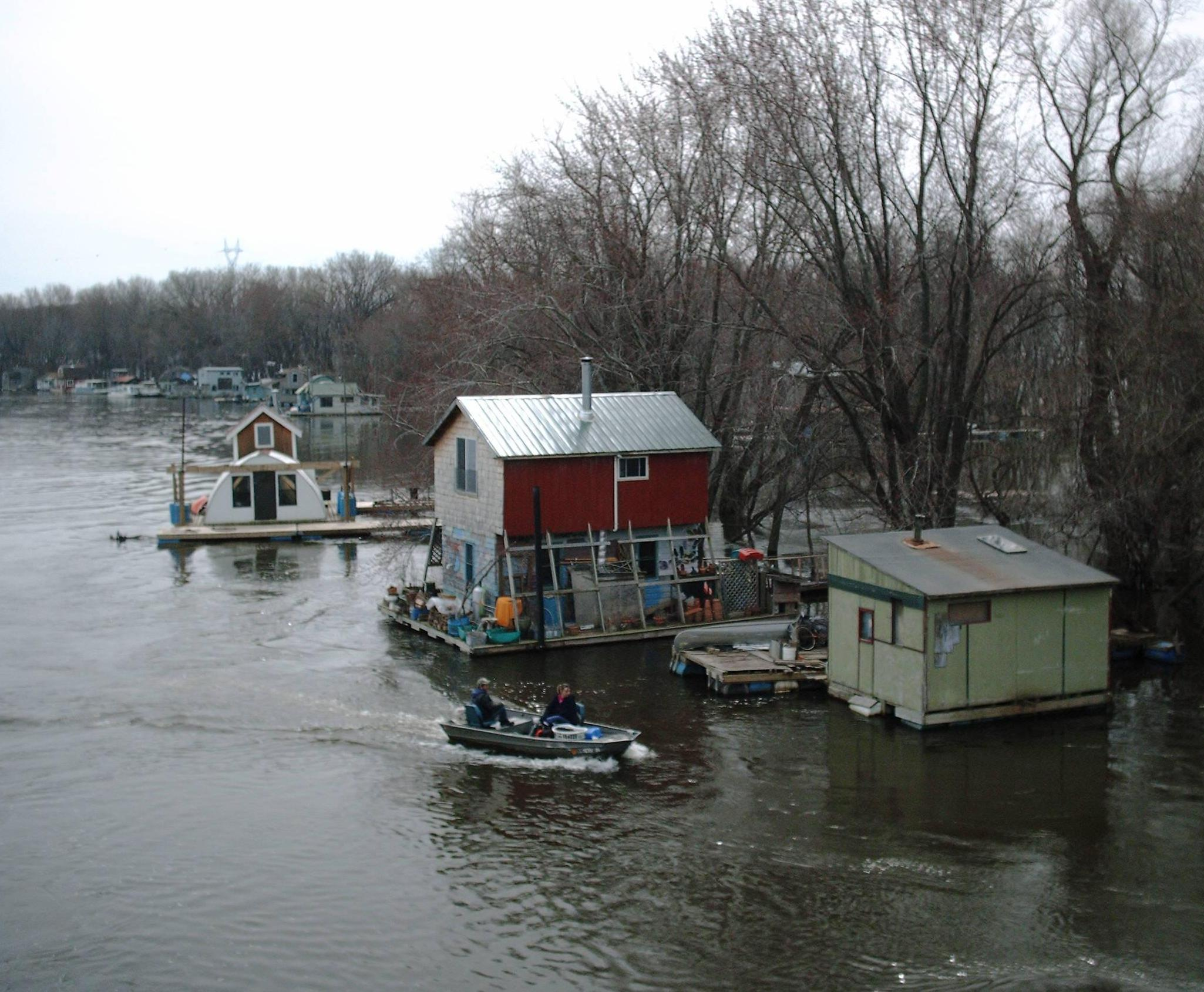
Some Latsch Island Boathouses, seen here in 2006

Latsch Island is an island located on the Mississippi River, and is part of the city of Winona, Minnesota. Latsch Island is best known for its off-the-grid counterculture houseboat ("boathouse") community, who occupy the eastern coastline of the island. During periods of flooding or high water levels, the island sometimes becomes two islands, with the eastern section referred to as Wolf Spider Island.

== Etymology ==
Similarly to nearby John A. Latsch State Park, Latsch Island is named after local 20th century Winona businessman John A. Latsch, who bought much of the area surrounding Winona and donated it so that it could be used as part of the national parks system. During periods of high water levels sometimes the Island is split in two, and some local residents use the name "Wolf Spider Island" to refer to the breakaway eastern portion. It has been suggested the name was derived from the Wolf Spider, to sound frightening and intimidating, with the intention of scaring non-residents away from the area. The name Wolf Spider Island has been in use since at least the early 2000s.

== History ==
=== Bridges ===
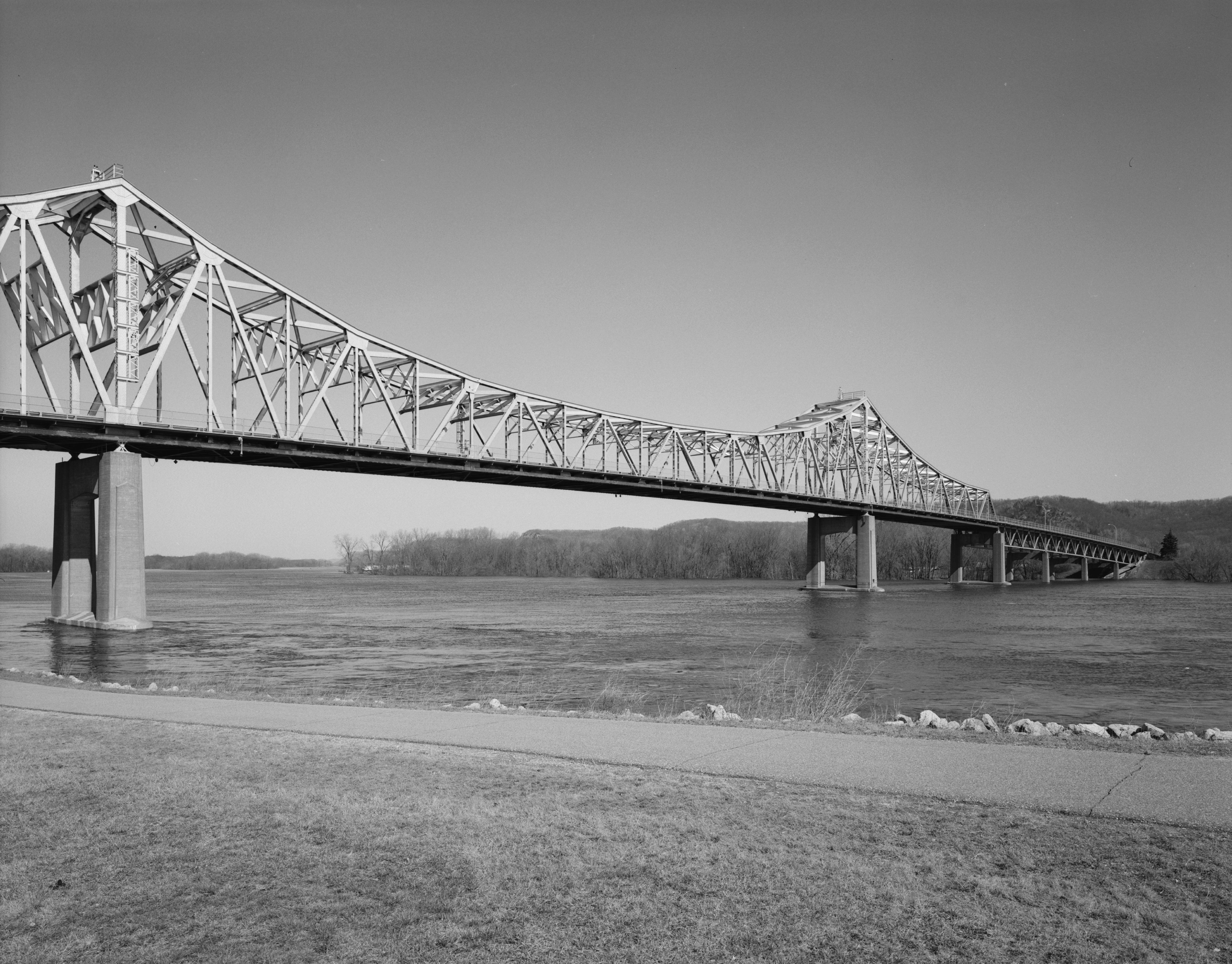
Main Channel Bridge, which bridges Winona to Wisconsin over Latsch Island, seen here in 1997

During the 1860s, the island (still not formally named) was used by the Winona and St. Peter Railroad, who constructed a railway bridge spanning the island into Winona. The "swing" bridge was completed in May 1871 but it partially collapsed when the bridge tender failed to secure the swing span on the first day of operation. The bridge was repaired and remained in service until it was abandoned and the swing span removed in 1977.

In 1887 a wooden bridge crossing the Mississippi over Latsch Island was created to join Winona to Wisconsin. In 1890 Congress authorised Winona to construct a new bridge over the Mississippi; the result was that in 1892 the Chicago Bridge and Iron Company created the steel and iron "Wagon Bridge" which spanned over the river and the island into Winona's main street. In 1917 the old wooden bridge was replaced by a concrete bridge.

In 1935, a bridge in nearby La Crosse, Wisconsin similar in design and materials as the "Wagon Bridge" collapsed, resulting in the deaths of two motorists. Seeking to avoid a similar disaster in Winona, a new bridge was authorised in 1938 and in 1941 the Main Channel Bridge was completed. It remains in operation to this day and is the main bridge between Latsch and the mainland, carrying Minnesota State Highway 43 between Wisconsin and Winona. The iron and steel "Wagon Bridge" was torn down and scrapped, as its materials were in high demand due to the outbreak of World War II. The concrete bridge was also due to be scrapped and destroyed, however, this was postponed until after the war. But in 1945 Winona asked the federal government to return control of the concrete bridge to the city, and their request was granted. The concrete bridge remains in operation to this day.

=== Boathouse Community ===
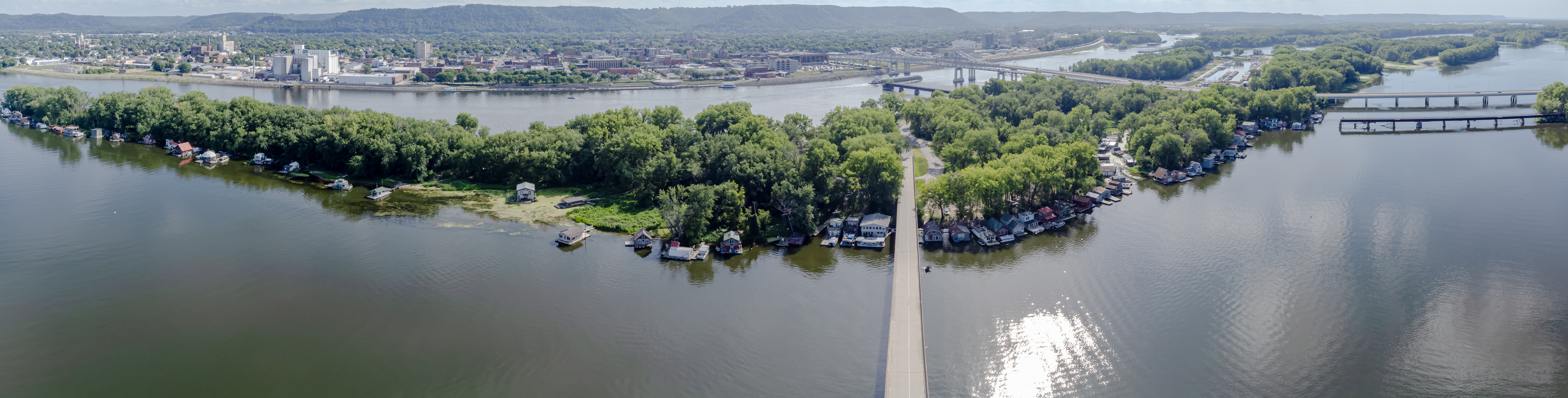
Latsch Island boathouse community

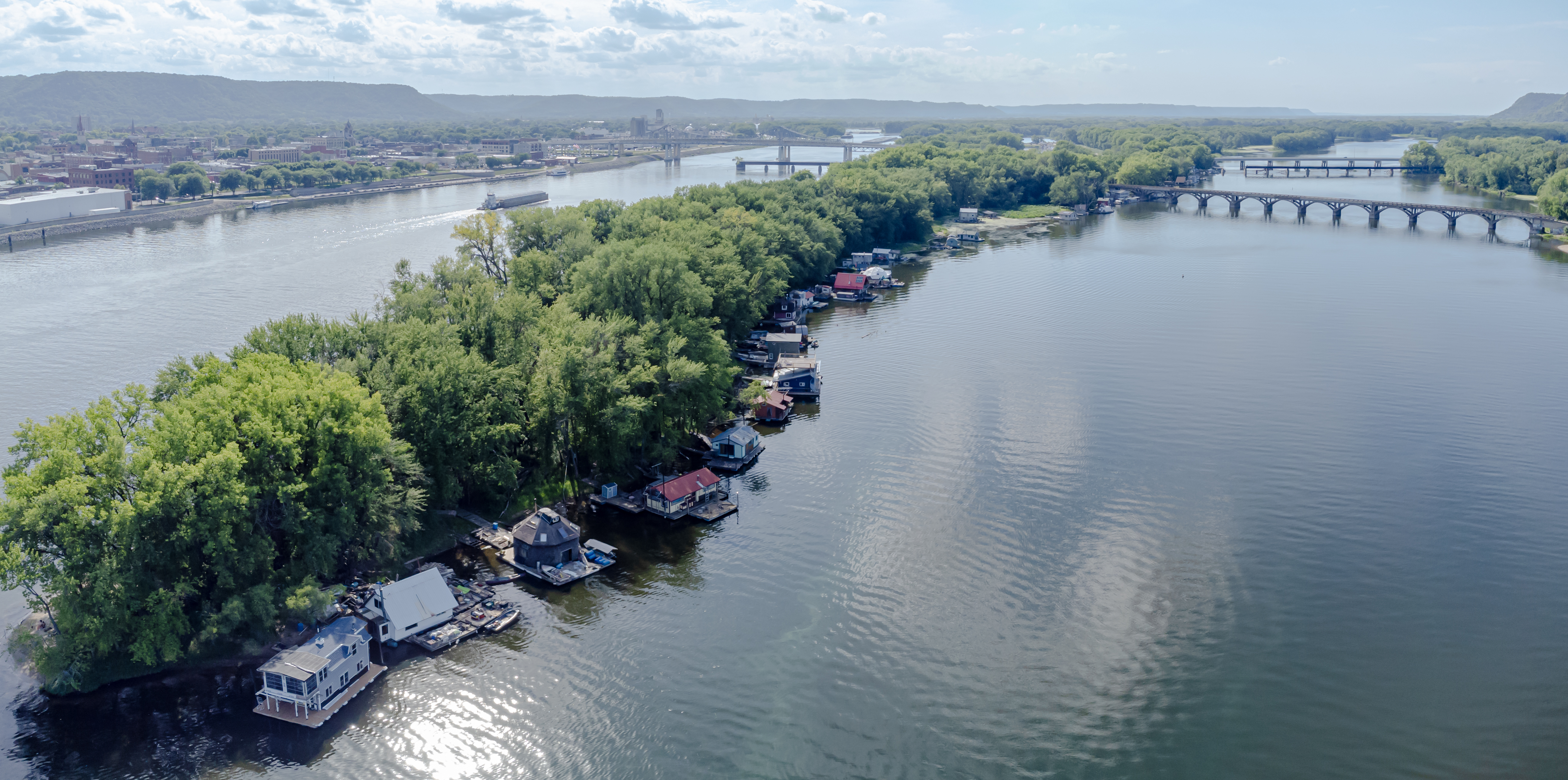
Bike path to the Island

By the 1930s Latsch Island, like many other islands near Winona, was simply being used unofficially as a place to dump waste and little more. It was roughly during this same era, the interwar period and the Great Depression, that squatters also began to take up residence on the island. Following the sinking of a barge on the north side of the island, almost all river traffic travelling past Winona began to choose to pass via the south side of the island. In turn, the squatters began mooring houseboats on the now trafficless north side of the island, safe in the knowledge they would not be disturbed there.

The houseboat settlement saw a resurgence of residents during the 1960s and 1970s, as the Hippie counterculture took an interest in the community. However, in July 1974 the city of Winona passed an ordinance requiring that all boathouses be licensed. Tensions flared between residents of Winona and Latsch, with complaints being made that the Latsch Islanders were taking unfair advantage of the municipal boat harbor's garbage, toilet and parking facilities. By March 1975 it had been decided that no further licenses for boathouses would be issued after 1 July. In 1980, all phone lines to the island were shut down after Winona officials alleged that they had discovered wires slung from trees and running through water on the island. They also suggested that many of the boathouses had hazardous structural issues, such as loose flotation barrels and dangerous wiring. In August 1980 Boathouses were formally sanctioned by the Winona City Council.

By 1979, the Minnesota Department of Natural Resources, the United States Army Corps of Engineers and Winona city officials were all seeking to outlaw the building of houseboats along the Mississippi in Minnesota. In response, an island council was created to represent the inhabitants of the island. The right to own and build houseboats in the area was brought to trial in this period, and the Judge, Dennis Challeen, himself a member of the Latsch island council, ruled in favour of the residents.

The 1980s saw increased regulations introduced over boathouses; Standards were set for buoyancy, roofing, external appearance, lavatories and preservation of adjacent property. However, simultaneously, the Department of Natural Resources began to prohibit owners from expanding or renovating their boathouses. This placed owners in a catch 22 where they could not comply with one authority without violating the directive of the other. Being unable to make improvements to their homes meant that owners were now faced with possible eviction.

In response, the frustrated Latsch Islanders created the Winona Boathouses Association in 1981, a non-profit organisation to formally represent the needs of the Latsch Island residents. All licensed owners were automatically made members of the organisation and were given a vote in its decisions. The Boathouses Association was successfully able to prevent city officials from phasing the boathouse community out of existence.

In 1998 Latsch island was officially made a part of the city of Winona. The number of houseboats on the island was strictly limited to 101, and a rule was put in place that houseboats could not be repaired beyond 50% of their original value. The intention of this law was to gradually displace the houseboats on the island, however, the law against the repairing of the houseboats is routinely ignored. Residents pay an annual mooring fee to the city in exchange for their right to dock on the island. As of 2021, this fee was $350 per annum.

== Demographics ==
Although the law declares that there should be only 101 houseboats on the island, some estimates place the amount higher, as high as 120. The population of the island is not static, as harsh winters can often force many residents off the island for the season. Flooding is another issue that can and has displaced portions of the population in the past.

It has been estimated that roughly 10% to 20% of the residents remain on the island all year long, regardless of climate conditions.

== Government ==
In 1981 the Island council, which informally worked as the democratic representation of the island, formalized itself by becoming the Winona Boathouse Association, a non-profit organization that works with the city on legal protection for the islanders. It also works to provide dumpsters and portable toilets for waste removal, as well as a boat dock. The Boathouse Association is fully recognized by the local government of Winona.

In line with its policy of discouraging occupation of the island, local authorities have placed no signs on the island denoting the presence of the houseboat settlement.

== Community ==
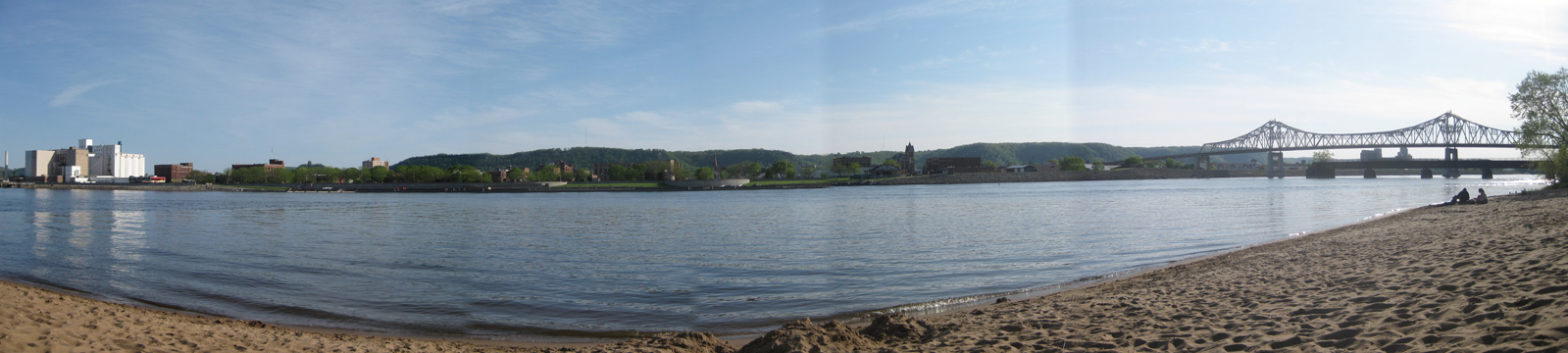
Winona, as seen from the southern shore of Latsch Island

The 1960s island community on Latsch Island has been described as a collection of "flower children, impoverished college students and other non-conformists", while some of the 1990s residents were referred to as being made up of "Third-generation boathouse people and 10th-generation boathouse cats". Despite its aura and reputation as a fringe bohemian community, Latsch Island has been home to residents from all walks of life. Former and current residents have included judges, professors, artists, and local politicians in addition to members of the Winona working class and homeless.

In spite of its proximity to Winona, which is connected to the island via a bridge, life on Latsch Island is described as "off-the-grid" and secluded. There is no plumbing on the island, and those who possess electricity typically do so from solar panels or small generators. Houseboats are typically heated by wood-fueled stoves. Freshwater cannot be drawn from the river itself, and instead many residents choose to either collect rainwater or haul water to the island from Winona.

The self describer "river rat" is used by the community to refer to anyone on the Mississippi River who partakes in their houseboat lifestyle. The river rats prefer to use the term "boathouse" rather than "houseboat" for a number of reasons; one reason is due to the legal restraints placed on the use of "houseboats" in the area. Another is the sentiment that because their residences are designed to be houses permanently docked at one location, the term "boathouse" is a better describer than "houseboat", which are usually designed to be boats first and residences second.
