= Wilson, Minnesota =

Unincorporated community in Minnesota, United States

Wilson
- Unincorporated community
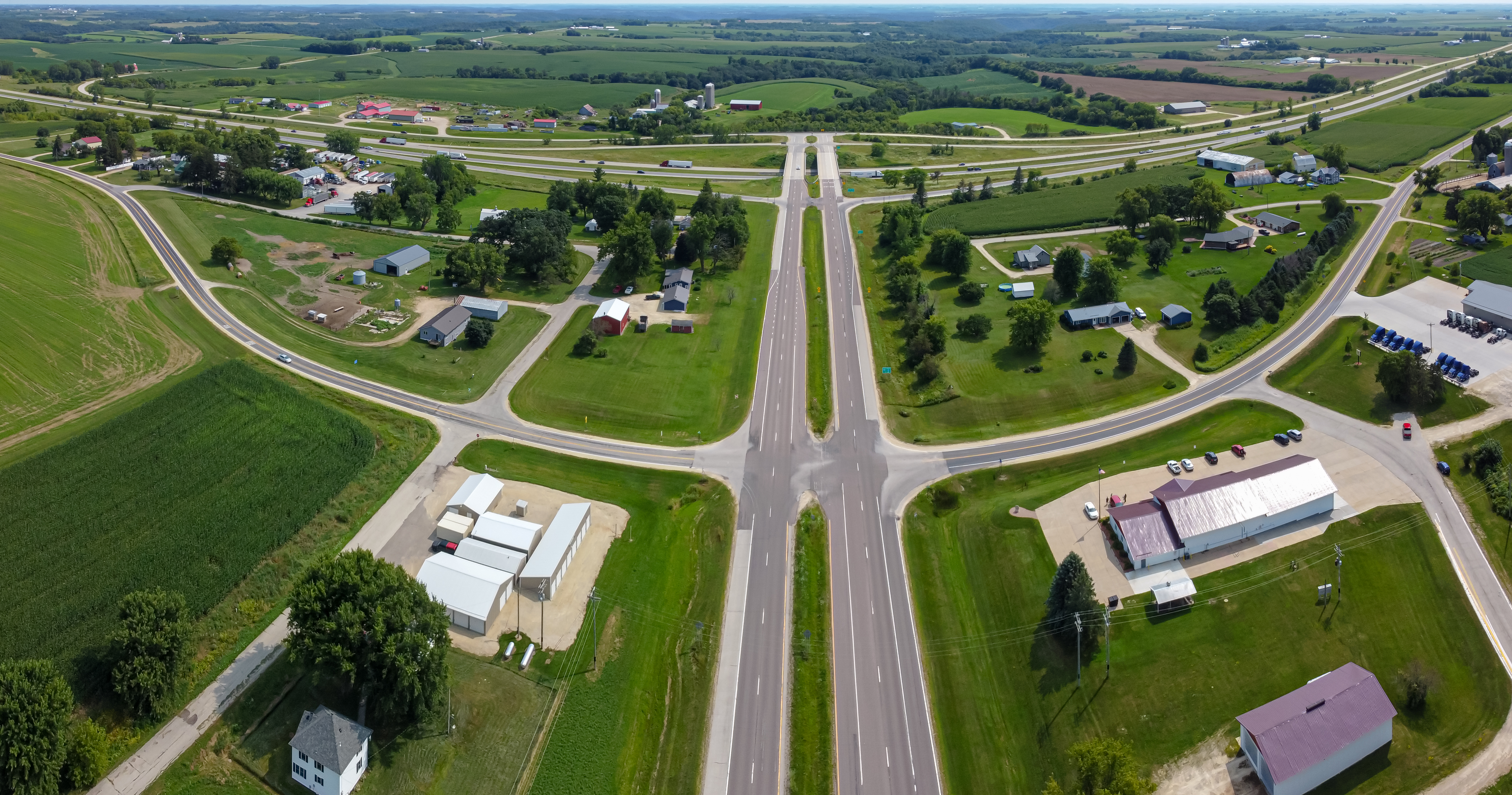
- MN-43 junction with I-90 in the background

- Location within Minnesota Location within the United States
- Coordinates: 43°57′36″N 91°41′05″W
- Country: United States
- State: Minnesota
- County: Winona County
- Township: Wilson Township
- Elevation: 1,335 ft (407 m)
- Time zone: UTC-6 (Central (CST))
  - Summer (DST): UTC-5 (CDT)
- ZIP code: 55987
- Area code: 507
- GNIS feature ID: 655015

Wilson is an unincorporated community in Wilson Township, Winona County, Minnesota, United States.

The community is located at the junction of Interstate 90 and State Highway 43 (MN 43).

Winona County Roads 12, 21, and 44 are also in the immediate area. Wilson had a post office from 1872 to 1928.

Nearby places include Winona, Wyattville, Centerville, and Witoka.

Gilmore Creek, West Burns Valley Creek, and East Burns Valley Creek all flow nearby.
