= Witoka, Minnesota =

Unincorporated community in Minnesota, United States

Witoka
- Unincorporated community
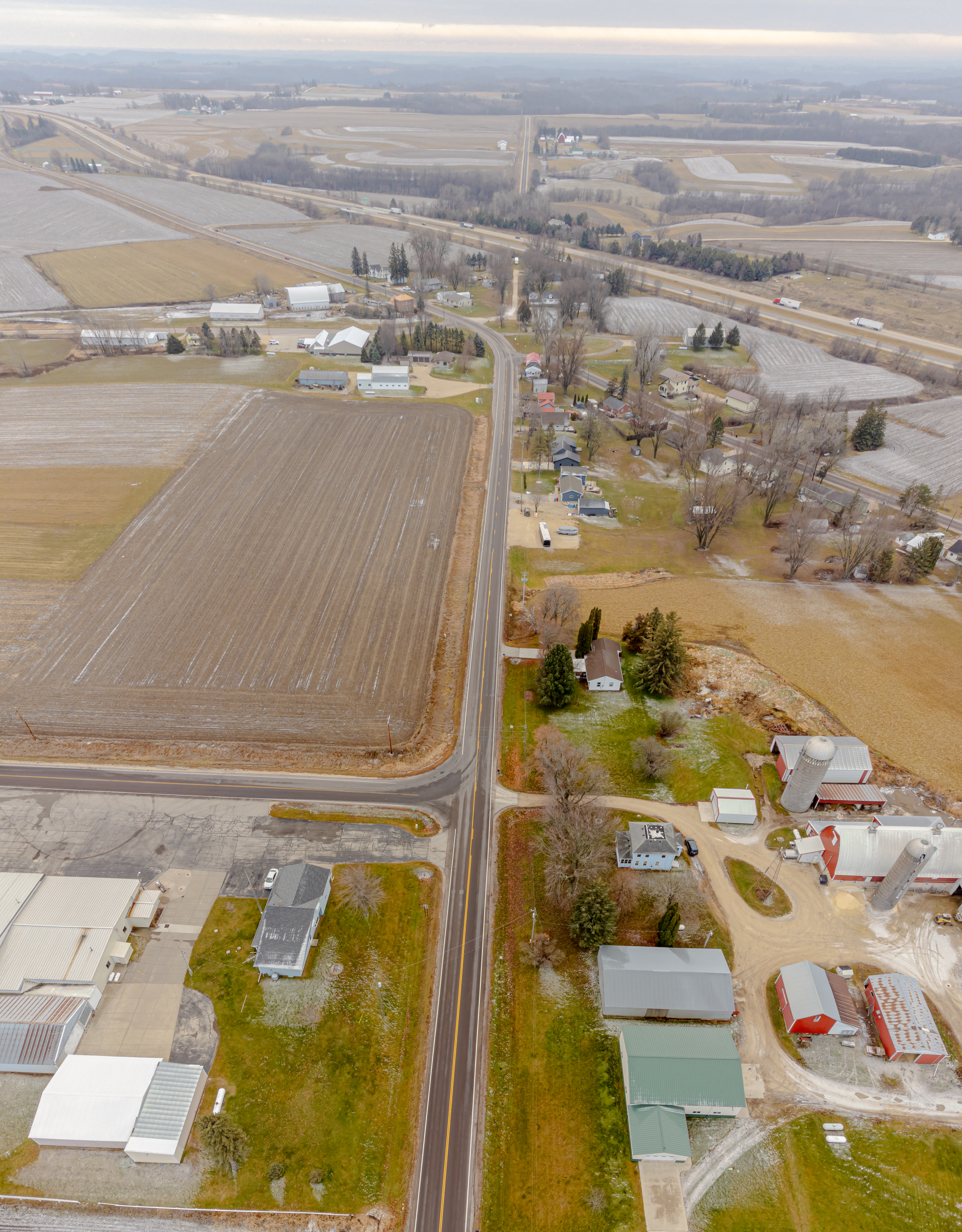
- County Road 12 goes through town and County Road 17 goes under I-90

- Location within Minnesota Location within the United States
- Coordinates: 43°56′00″N 91°37′13″W
- Country: United States
- State: Minnesota
- County: Winona County
- Township: Wilson Township and Wiscoy Township
- Elevation: 1,335 ft (407 m)
- Time zone: UTC-6 (Central (CST))
  - Summer (DST): UTC-5 (CDT)
- ZIP code: 55987
- Area code: 507
- GNIS feature ID: 654296

Witoka is an unincorporated community in Winona County, Minnesota, United States.

== Geography ==
The community is located near the junction of Winona County Roads 9, 12, 15, and 17. Interstate 90 and State Highway 76 (MN 76) are nearby. Witoka is located within Wilson Township and Wiscoy Township. Nearby places include Winona, Wilson, Centerville, and Ridgeway. Cedar Creek, Money Creek, and Pleasant Valley Creek all flow nearby.

== History ==
Witoka was platted in 1855, and named for the daughter of an Indian chief. A post office was established at Witoka in 1857, and remained in operation until 1918.
