= Wolf spider (disambiguation) =

Wolf spider can refer to:

== Biology ==
- Wolf spider, a species of spider

== Comics ==
- Wolf Spider (comics), a Marvel Comics character
- Wolf Spider (DC Comics), a DC Comics character

== Location ==
- Latsch Island, its eastern section is referred to as Wolf Spider Island
