= Wiscoy Township, Winona County, Minnesota =

Wiscoy Township, Minnesota
- Township
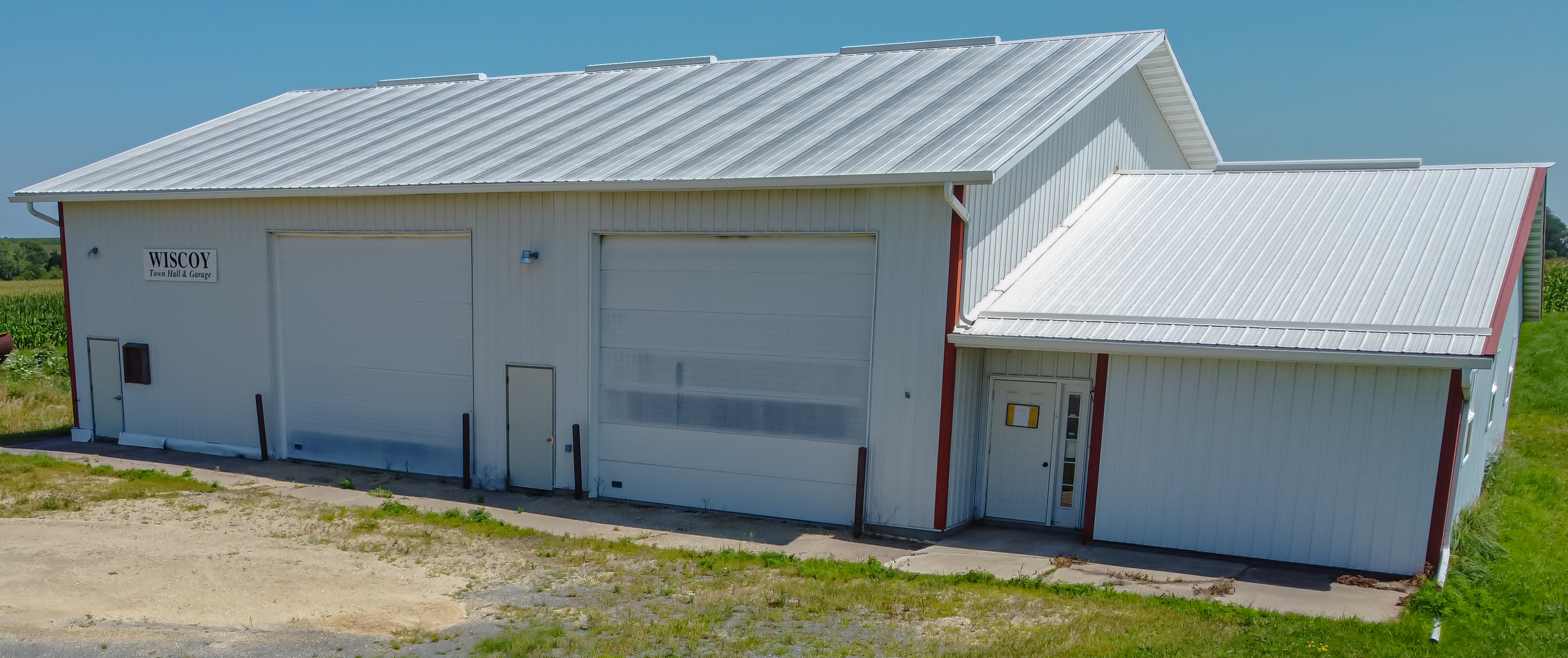
- Wiscoy Town Hall south of Witoka

- Location within the state of Minnesota Wiscoy Township, Minnesota (the United States)
- Coordinates: 43°54′6″N 91°39′15″W
- Country: United States
- State: Minnesota
- County: Winona

Area
  - Total: 35.7 sq mi (92.5 km^{2})
  - Land: 35.7 sq mi (92.5 km^{2})
  - Water: 0 sq mi (0.0 km^{2})
- Elevation: 873 ft (266 m)

Population (2010)
  - Total: 361
  - Density: 10.1/sq mi (3.90/km^{2})
- Time zone: UTC-6 (Central (CST))
  - Summer (DST): UTC-5 (CDT)
- ZIP code: 55987
- Area code: 507
- FIPS code: 27-71230
- GNIS feature ID: 0666033

Wiscoy Township is a township in Winona County, Minnesota, United States. The population was 361 at the 2010 census.

== Geography ==
According to the US Census Bureau, the township has a total area of 35.7 square miles (92.5 km^{2}), all land.

== Demographics ==
As of the census of 2000, there were 336 people, 133 households, and 102 families residing in the township. The population density was 9.4 people per square mile (3.6/km^{2}). There were 145 housing units at an average density of 4.1/sq mi (1.6/km^{2}). The racial makeup of the township was 98.81% White, 0.60% Asian, 0.60% from other races.

There were 133 households, out of which 37.6% had children under the age of 18 living with them, 61.7% were married couples living together, 7.5% had a female householder with no husband present, and 23.3% were non-families. 20.3% of all households were made up of individuals, and 3.0% had someone living alone who was 65 years of age or older. The average household size was 2.53 and the average family size was 2.86.

In the township the population was spread out, with 26.5% under the age of 18, 6.3% from 18 to 24, 31.5% from 25 to 44, 30.4% from 45 to 64, and 5.4% who were 65 years of age or older. The median age was 39 years. For every 100 females, there were 108.7 males. For every 100 females age 18 and over, there were 114.8 males.

The median income for a household in the township was $36,607, and the median income for a family was $42,083. Males had a median income of $27,750 versus $25,000 for females. The per capita income for the township was $15,814. About 6.1% of families and 8.1% of the population were below the poverty line, including 6.3% of those under age 18 and none of those age 65 or over.
