= North Channel Bridge =

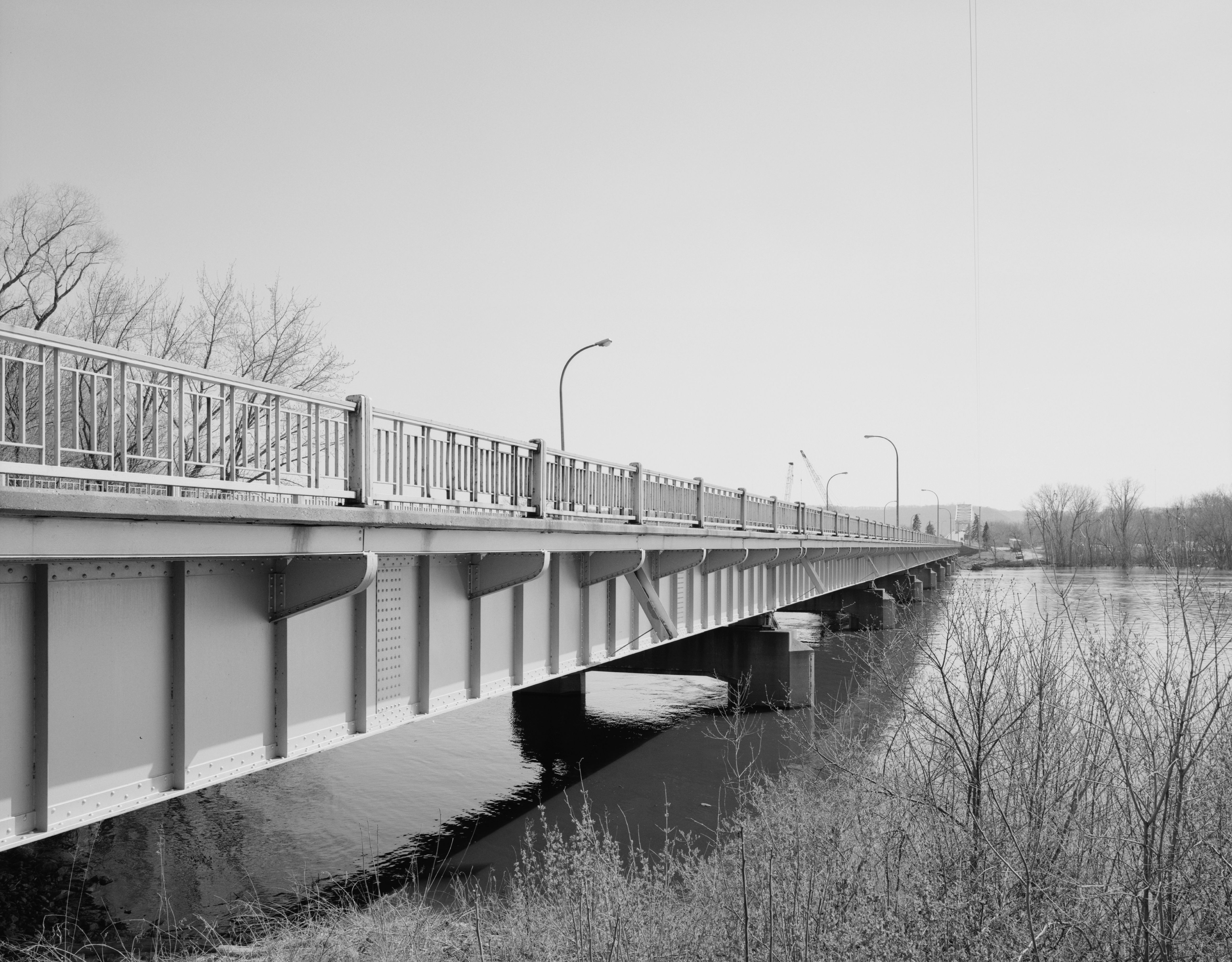
- North Channel Bridge, looking south from the north approach.
- Coordinates: 44°03′44″N 91°38′15″W
- Carries: Two lanes of MN 43 and WIS 54
- Crosses: Mississippi River
- Locale: Winona, Minnesota
- Maintained by: Wisconsin Department of Transportation
- ID number: B-06-0752 (Wisconsin), 5930 (Minnesota)

Characteristics
- Design: Concrete girder bridge
- Total length: 1,008 feet (307 m)
- Width: 61 feet (19 m)
- Longest span: 101 feet (31 m)
- Clearance below: 20 feet (6.1 m)

History
- Opened: 1997

Location
- Interactive map of North Channel Bridge

The North Channel Bridge crosses the north channel of the Mississippi River between Latsch Island (part of Winona, Minnesota) and Buffalo County, Wisconsin.

The bridge has a street setup, with one lane in either direction. It carries Minnesota State Highway 43 and WI 54 in either direction. Immediately to the south is the Main Channel Bridge.

== Images ==
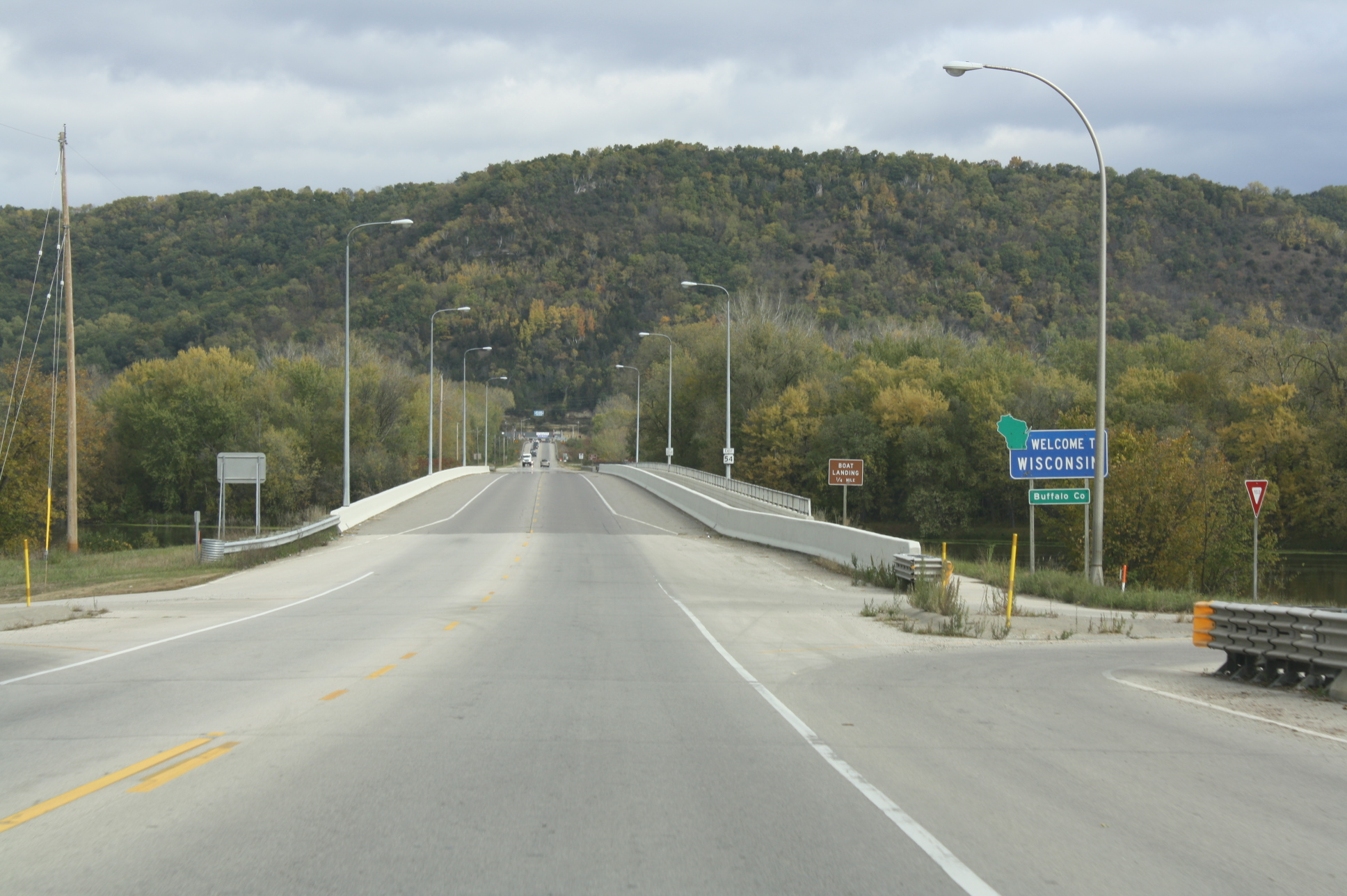
Looking south along the center line

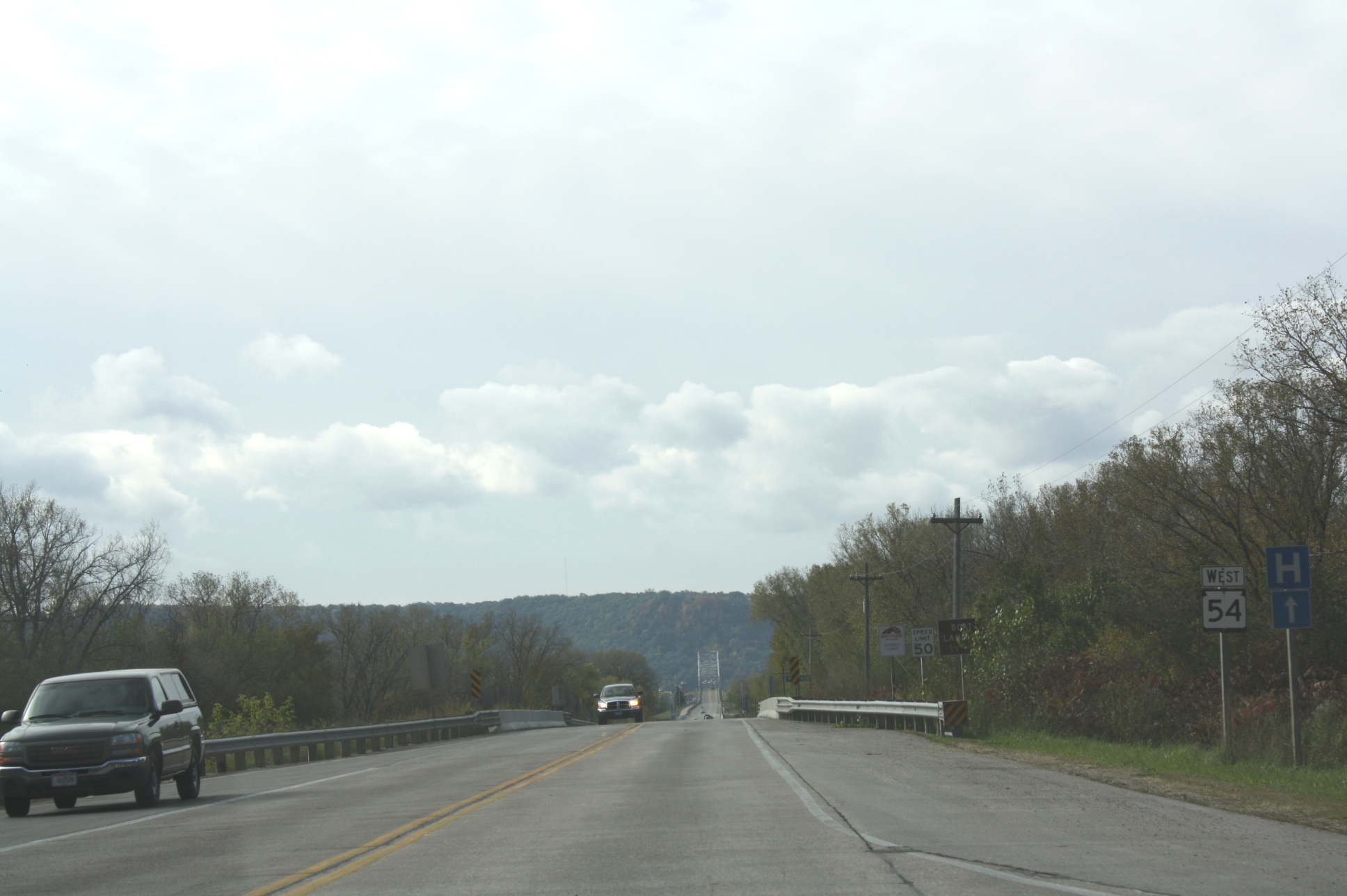
Looking north along the centerline

== See also ==
- List of bridges documented by the Historic American Engineering Record in Minnesota
- List of crossings of the Upper Mississippi River
