= Pleasant Hill Township, Winona County, Minnesota =

Pleasant Hill Township, Minnesota
- Township
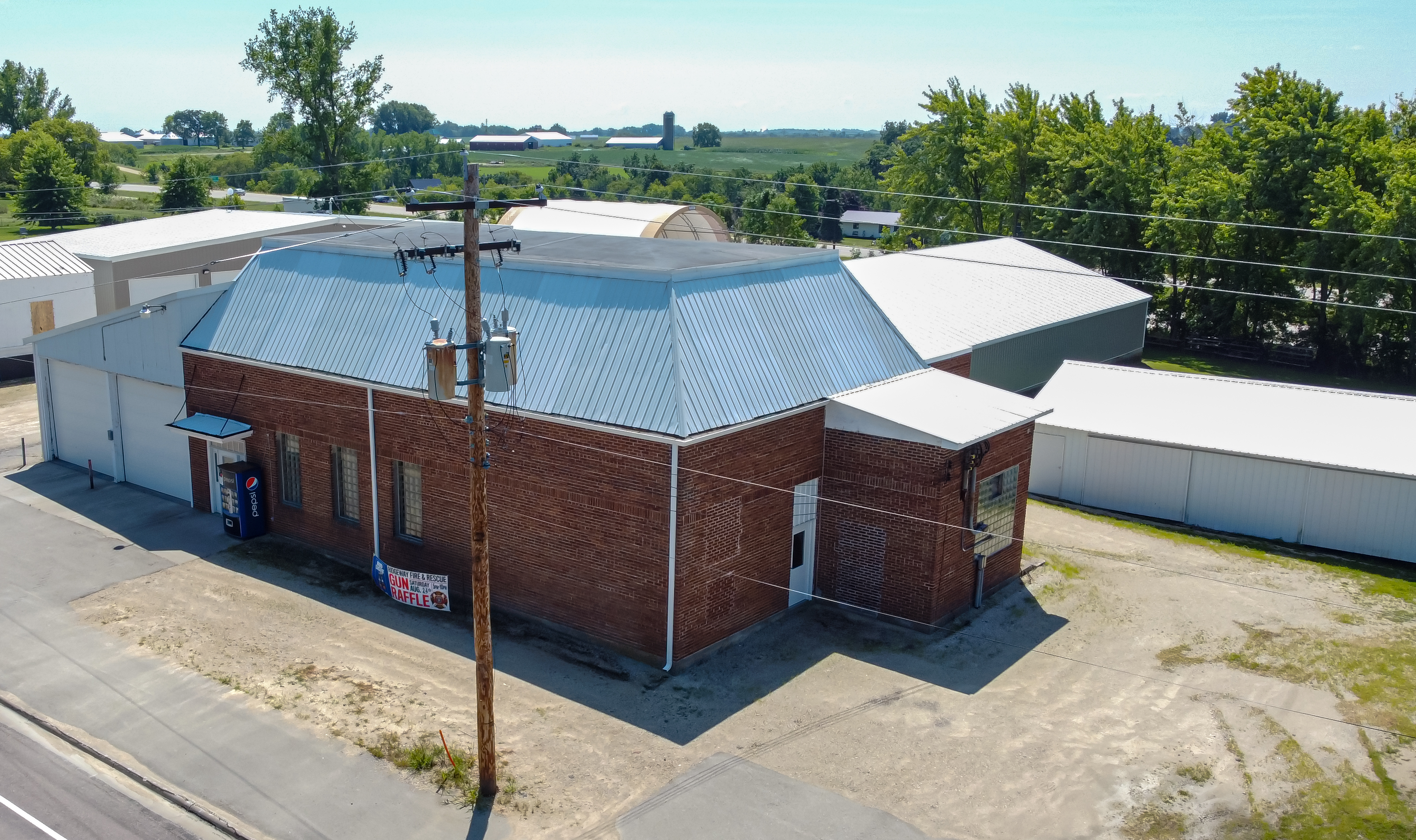
- Pleasant Hill Town Hall in Ridgeway

- Location within the state of Minnesota Pleasant Hill Township, Minnesota (the United States)
- Coordinates: 43°52′59″N 91°32′34″W
- Country: United States
- State: Minnesota
- County: Winona

Area
  - Total: 35.7 sq mi (92.5 km^{2})
  - Land: 35.7 sq mi (92.5 km^{2})
  - Water: 0 sq mi (0.0 km^{2})
- Elevation: 1,302 ft (397 m)

Population (2010)
  - Total: 531
  - Density: 14.9/sq mi (5.74/km^{2})
- Time zone: UTC-6 (Central (CST))
  - Summer (DST): UTC-5 (CDT)
- FIPS code: 27-51568
- GNIS feature ID: 0665320

Pleasant Hill Township is a township in Winona County, Minnesota, United States. The population was 531 at the 2010 census.

Pleasant Hill Township was so named for its scenic hills, a pioneer settler having said "What a pleasant hill!" upon his first visit.

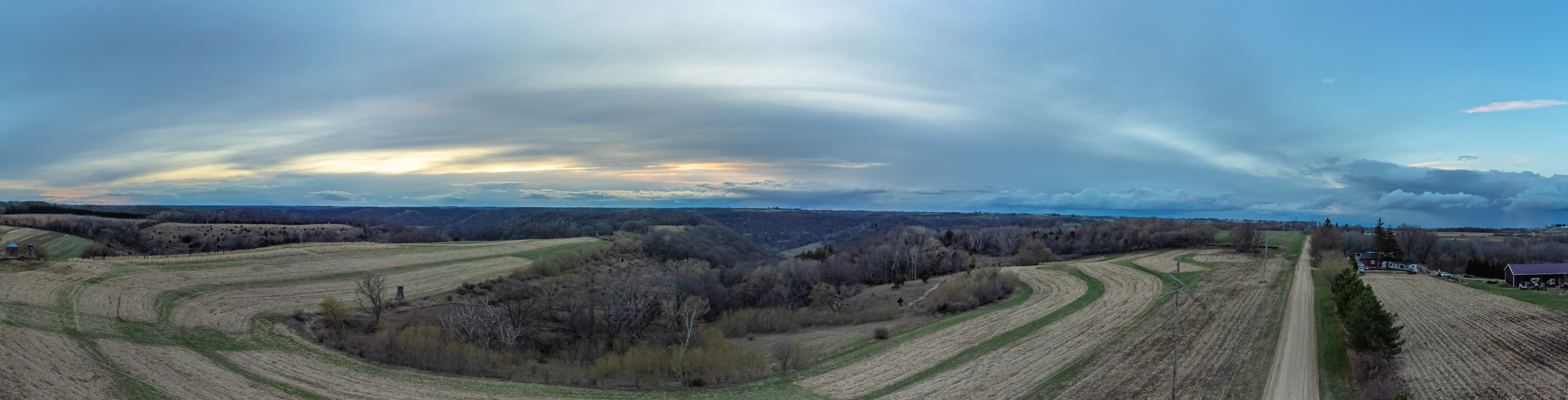

== Geography ==
According to the United States Census Bureau, the township has a total area of 35.7 square miles (92.5 km^{2}), all land.

== Demographics ==
As of the census of 2000, there were 535 people, 185 households, and 148 families residing in the township. The population density was 15.0 people per square mile (5.8/km^{2}). There were 193 housing units at an average density of 5.4/sq mi (2.1/km^{2}). The racial makeup of the township was 98.13% White, 1.12% Asian, 0.56% Pacific Islander, 0.19% from other races. Hispanic or Latino of any race were 0.93% of the population.

There were 185 households, out of which 38.4% had children under the age of 18 living with them, 68.6% were married couples living together, 2.7% had a female householder with no husband present, and 20.0% were non-families. 18.4% of all households were made up of individuals, and 7.6% had someone living alone who was 65 years of age or older. The average household size was 2.87 and the average family size was 3.23.

In the township the population was spread out, with 28.2% under the age of 18, 9.0% from 18 to 24, 26.0% from 25 to 44, 26.2% from 45 to 64, and 10.7% who were 65 years of age or older. The median age was 38 years. For every 100 females, there were 114.0 males. For every 100 females age 18 and over, there were 109.8 males.

The median income for a household in the township was $40,000, and the median income for a family was $44,583. Males had a median income of $29,286 versus $21,838 for females. The per capita income for the township was $17,447. About 4.5% of families and 4.7% of the population were below the poverty line, including 2.1% of those under age 18 and none of those age 65 or over.
