= Ridgeway, Minnesota =

Unincorporated community in Minnesota, United States

Ridgeway
- Unincorporated community
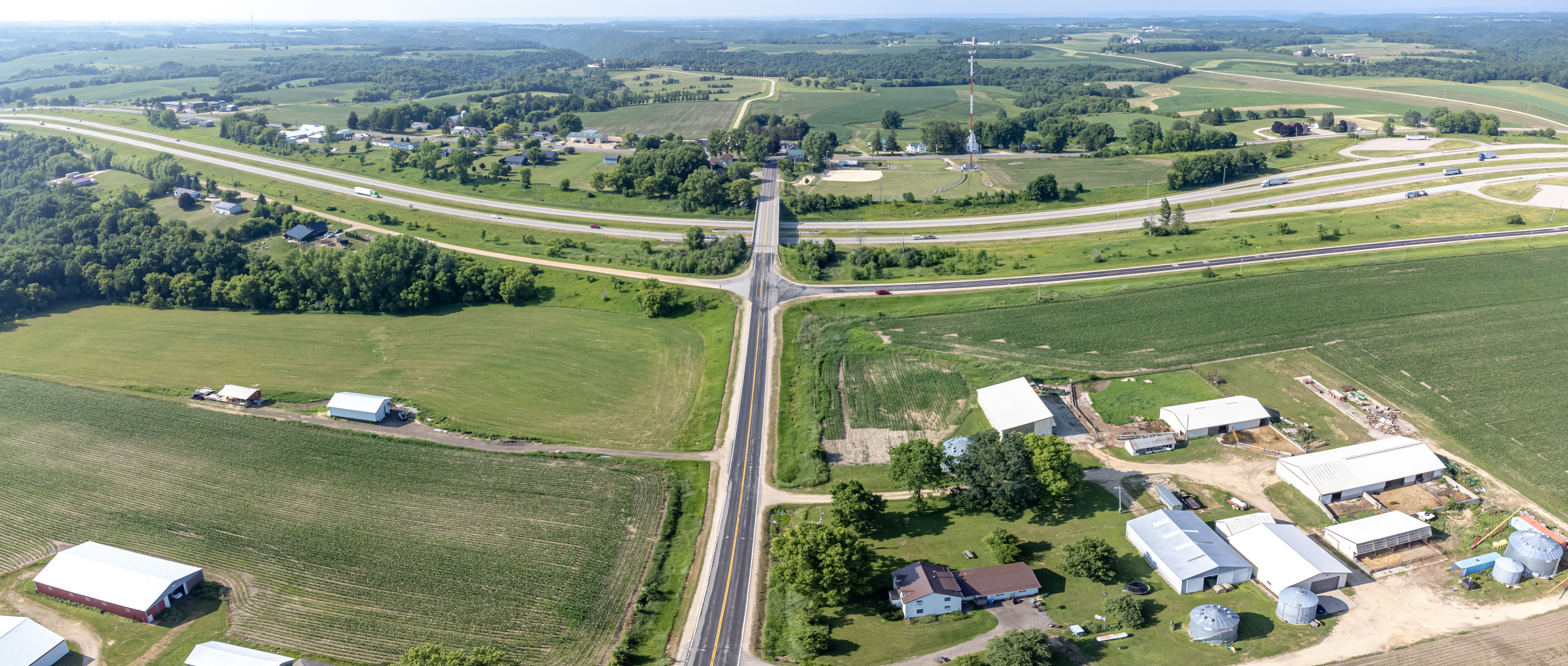
- Looking North

- Location within Minnesota Location within the United States
- Coordinates: 43°54′43″N 91°33′37″W
- Country: United States
- State: Minnesota
- County: Winona County
- Township: Pleasant Hill Township
- Elevation: 1,342 ft (409 m)
- Time zone: UTC-6 (Central (CST))
  - Summer (DST): UTC-5 (CDT)
- ZIP code: 55987, 55943, 55925
- Area code: 507
- GNIS feature ID: 650076

Ridgeway is an unincorporated community in Pleasant Hill Township, Winona County, Minnesota, United States.

The community is located near the junction of Winona County Roads 11, 12, and 104.

Interstate 90 and State Highway 76 (MN 76) are nearby. ZIP codes 55987 (Winona), 55943 (Houston), and 55925 (Dakota) all meet near Ridgeway.

Nearby places include Winona, Houston, Dakota, Witoka, Lamoille, Nodine, and New Hartford Township.

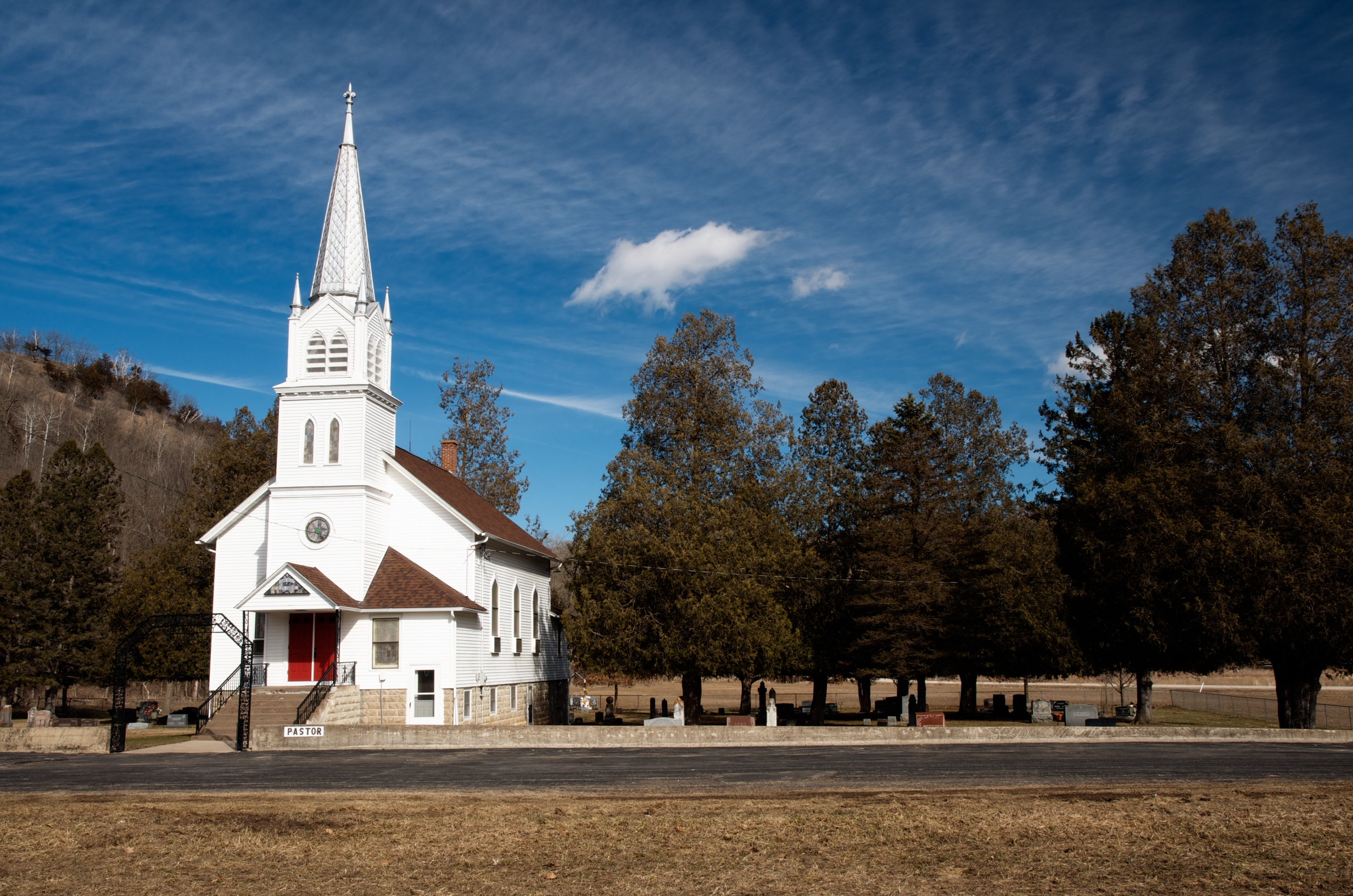
Church near Ridgeway, MN
