= Warren Township, Winona County, Minnesota =

Warren Township, Minnesota
- Township
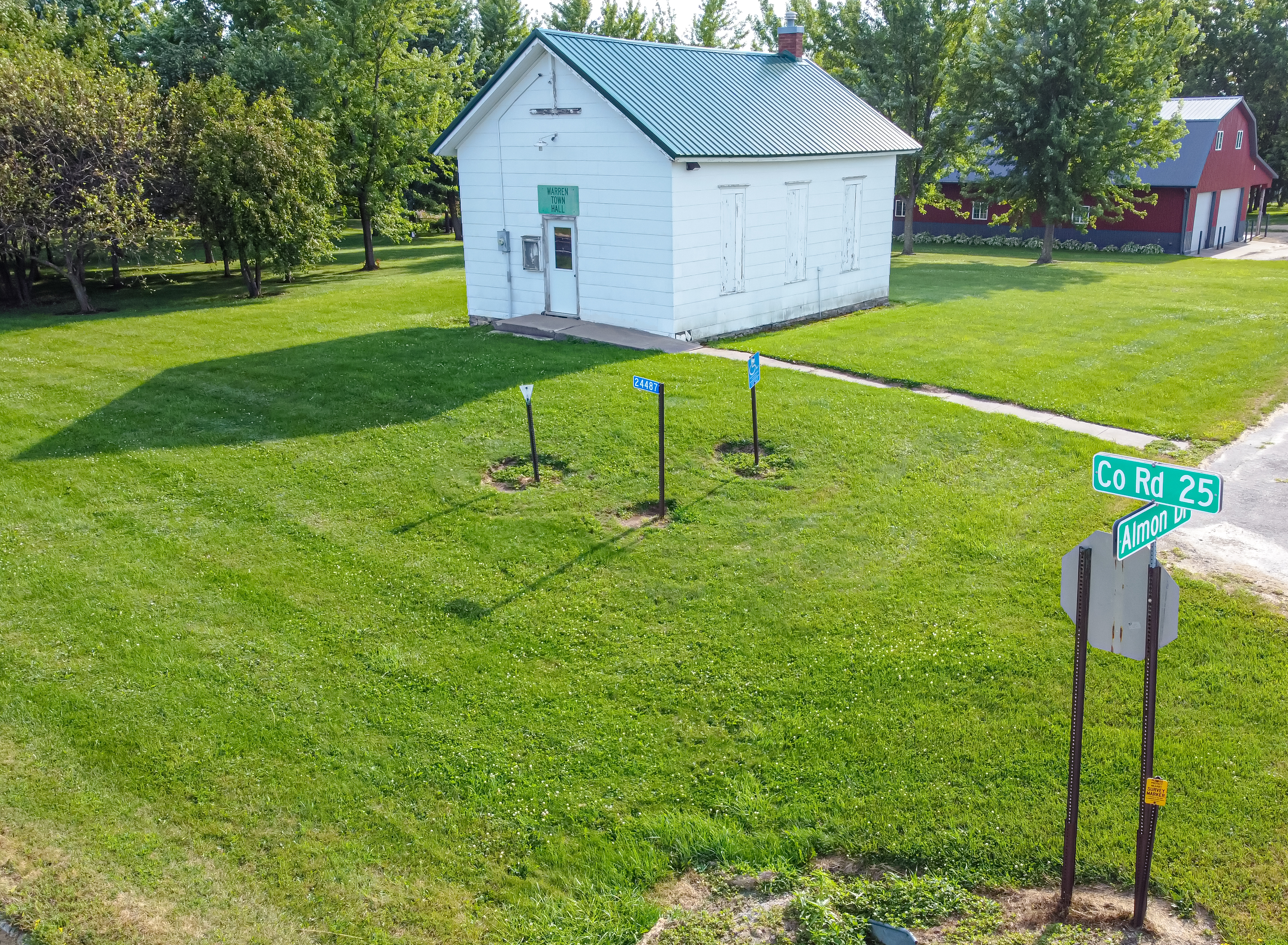
- Town hall

- Location within the state of Minnesota Warren Township, Minnesota (the United States)
- Coordinates: 43°58′59″N 91°47′16″W
- Country: United States
- State: Minnesota
- County: Winona

Area
  - Total: 35.5 sq mi (92.0 km^{2})
  - Land: 35.5 sq mi (92.0 km^{2})
  - Water: 0 sq mi (0.0 km^{2})
- Elevation: 1,230 ft (375 m)

Population (2010)
  - Total: 651
  - Density: 18.3/sq mi (7.08/km^{2})
- Time zone: UTC-6 (Central (CST))
  - Summer (DST): UTC-5 (CDT)
- FIPS code: 27-68188
- GNIS feature ID: 0665917

Warren Township is a township in Winona County, Minnesota, United States. The population was 651 at the 2010 census.

Warren Township was organized in 1858, and probably named for Warren Wilson, a pioneer settler.

== Geography ==
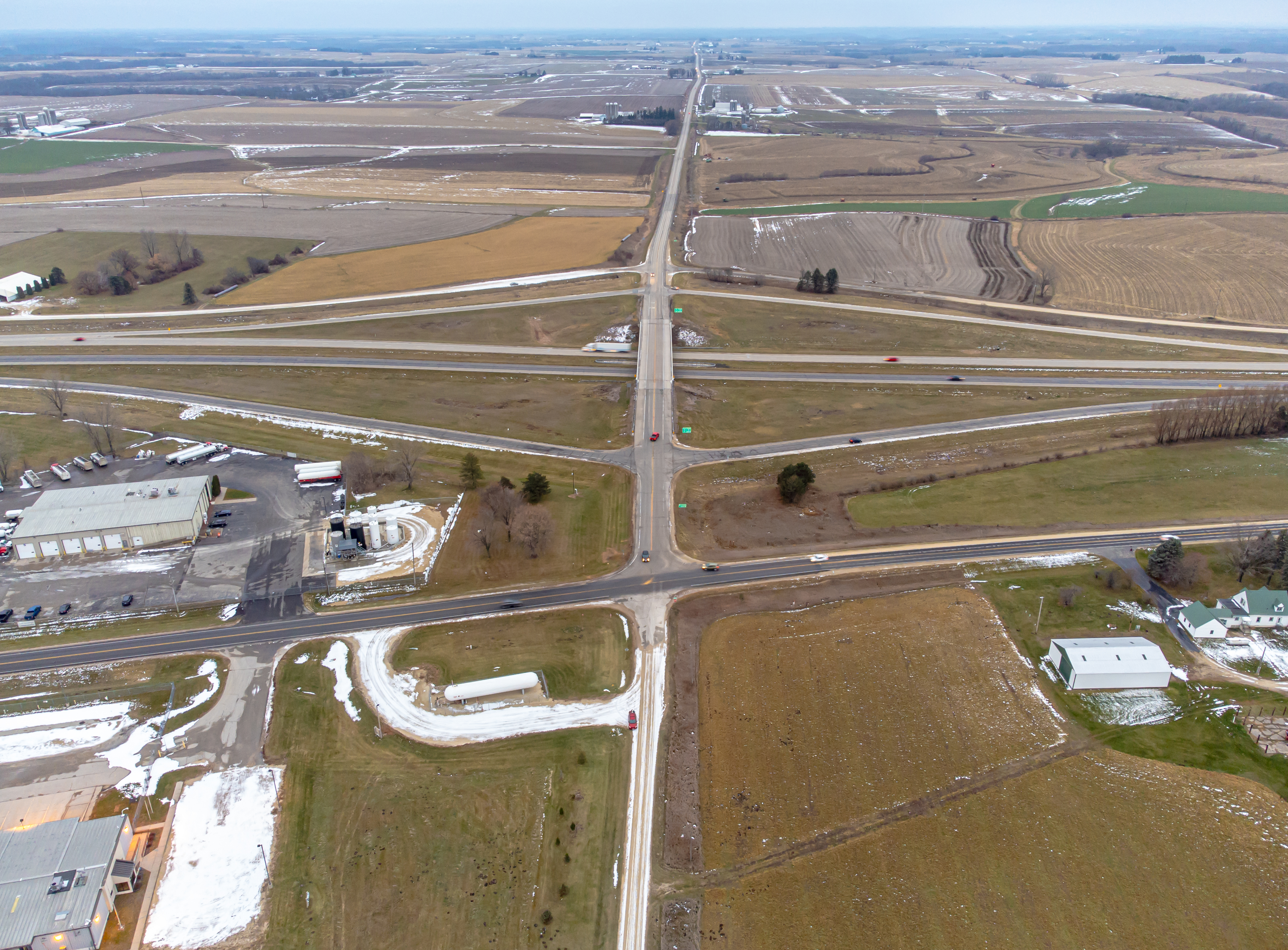
MN-43 and I-90 junction in Warren Township, Winona County

According to the United States Census Bureau, the township has a total area of 35.5 square miles (92.0 km^{2}), all land.

== Demographics ==
As of the census of 2000, there were 629 people, 216 households, and 171 families residing in the township. The population density was 17.7 people per square mile (6.8/km^{2}). There were 225 housing units at an average density of 6.3/sq mi (2.4/km^{2}). The racial makeup of the township was 98.73% White, 0.48% Native American, 0.16% Asian, 0.16% from other races, and 0.48% from two or more races. Hispanic or Latino of any race were 0.79% of the population.

There were 216 households, out of which 44.9% had children under the age of 18 living with them, 70.8% were married couples living together, 3.2% had a female householder with no husband present, and 20.4% were non-families. 17.1% of all households were made up of individuals, and 4.6% had someone living alone who was 65 years of age or older. The average household size was 2.91 and the average family size was 3.29.

In the township the population was spread out, with 31.6% under the age of 18, 7.5% from 18 to 24, 27.8% from 25 to 44, 23.4% from 45 to 64, and 9.7% who were 65 years of age or older. The median age was 35 years. For every 100 females, there were 112.5 males. For every 100 females age 18 and over, there were 106.7 males.

The median income for a household in the township was $37,167, and the median income for a family was $42,917. Males had a median income of $31,339 versus $28,125 for females. The per capita income for the township was $15,372. About 8.9% of families and 7.3% of the population were below the poverty line, including 3.8% of those under age 18 and 14.9% of those age 65 or over.
