= Main Channel Bridge (Winona) =

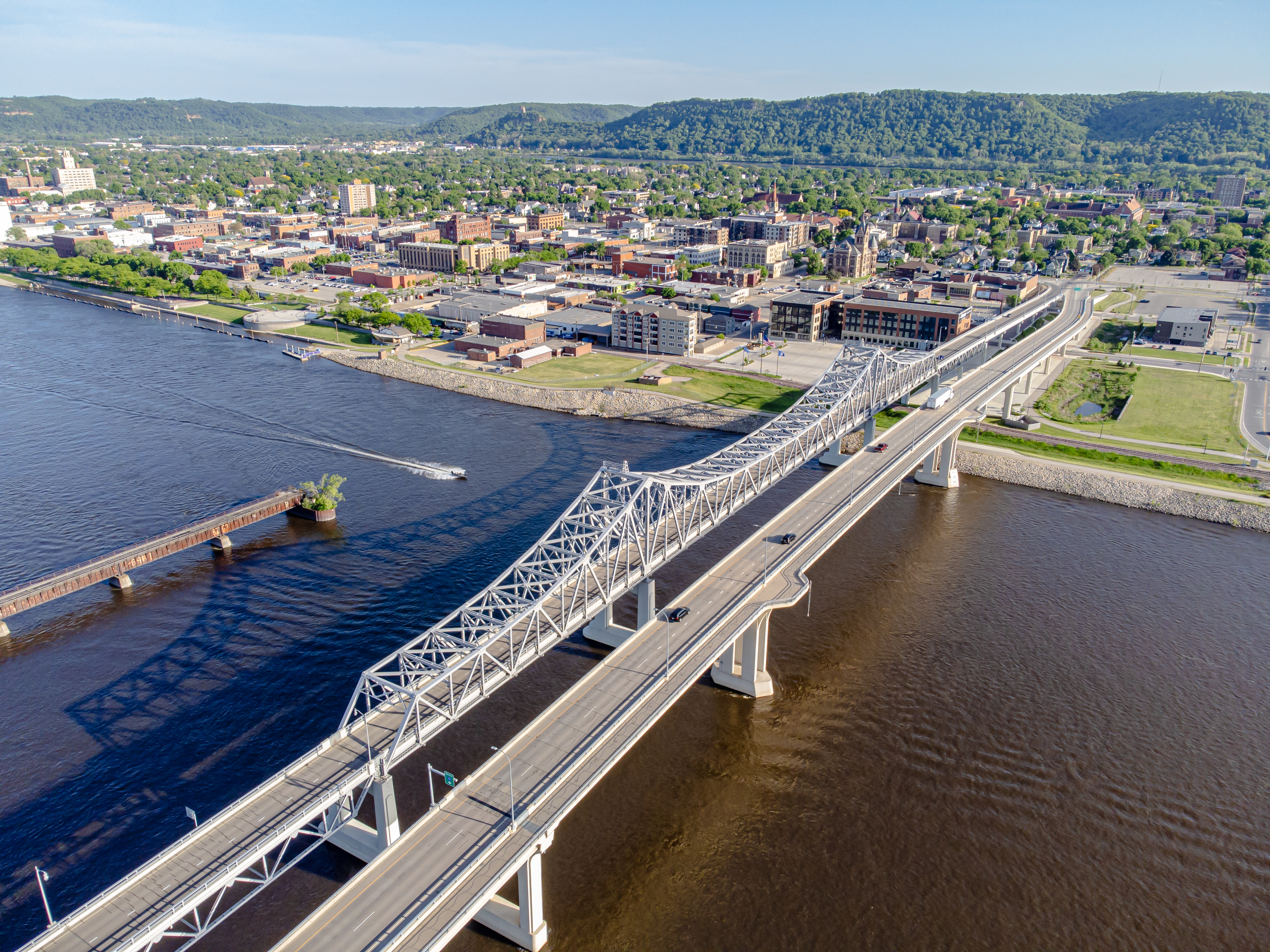
- Coordinates: 44°3′27.0″N 91°38′23.5″W
- Carries: Four lanes of MN 43
- Crosses: Mississippi River
- Maintained by: Minnesota Department of Transportation

Characteristics
- Design: Steel cantilever bridge / Concrete box girder
- Total length: 2,288 feet (697 m)
- Width: 31 feet (9.4 m): 2 automobile lanes (cantilever span) / 50 feet 4 inches (15.34 m): 2 automobile lanes plus pedestrian/bicycle path (concrete box girder span)
- Longest span: 450 feet (140 m)

History
- Construction start: 1941 (cantilever span) / July 2014 (concrete box girder span)
- Construction end: November 1942 (cantilever span) / August 2016 (concrete box girder span)
- Opened: November 21, 1942 (original cantilever bridge) / August 27, 2016 (new concrete box girder bridge) / July 1, 2019 (rehabilitated cantilever bridge)

Location
- Interactive map of Main Channel Bridge

Main Channel Bridge (Winona) consists of a pair of bridges, the original cantilever bridge, and a concrete box girder bridge completed in 2016, that span the main channel of the Mississippi River in the United States between Winona, Minnesota, and Latsch Island. Another bridge, the North Channel Bridge, connects the island to rural Buffalo County, Wisconsin. The bridge carries Minnesota State Highway 43, which continues as Wisconsin Highway 54 at the Minnesota/Wisconsin state line on the nearby North Channel Bridge; in Winona, it connects to Winona Street.

Construction on the original cantilever bridge was started just before the U.S. entered World War II, and the construction was hastened to finish in November 1942, despite labor shortages, difficulty obtaining materials, and high water. It was built in 1941–1942 by the Minnesota Department of Transportation (MnDOT).

On May 17, 2008, the United States Postal Service announced that the bridge would be on the Minnesota sesquicentennial commemorative stamp.

Following an inspection of the bridge's gusset plates, the Minnesota Department of Transportation closed the bridge on June 3, 2008, with over 60-mile-long (97 km) detours as an alternative. The bridge reopened on June 14, 2008.

After considering a number of alternatives, including rehabilitation of only the original bridge, or construction of a new bridge and demolition of the original bridge, on August 23, 2012, the Minnesota Department of Transportation announced approval for plans to build a new two-lane concrete box girder bridge, prior to rehabilitating the original bridge. Construction of the new bridge began immediately upstream of the cantilever bridge in July 2014, and opened for traffic in August 2016. Following the opening of the new bridge, the original cantilever bridge closed for rehabilitation. The rehabilitated cantilever bridge opened July 1, 2019, allowing 2 lanes in each direction.

== Gallery ==
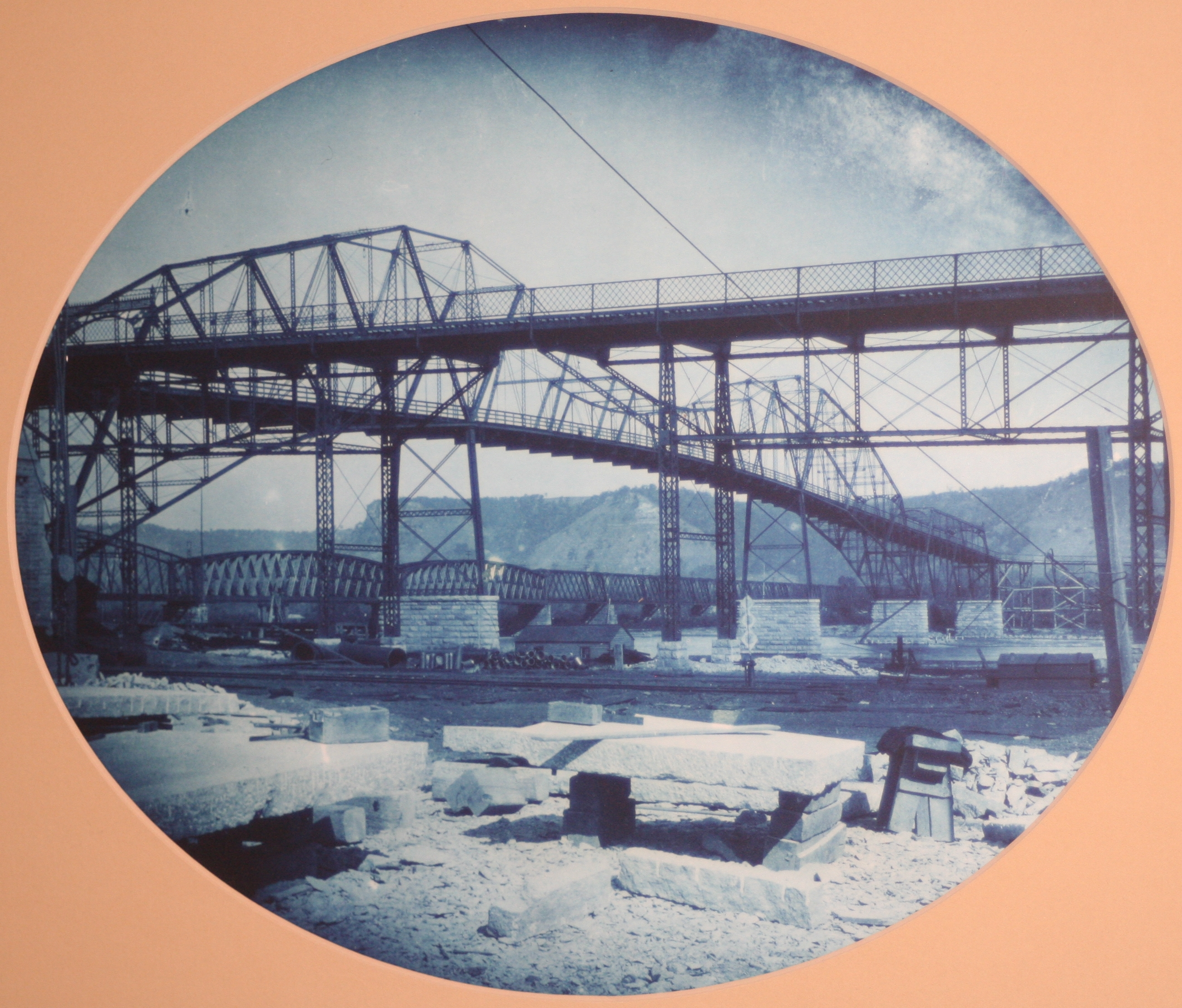
Historical "wagon bridge" at Winona, 1892

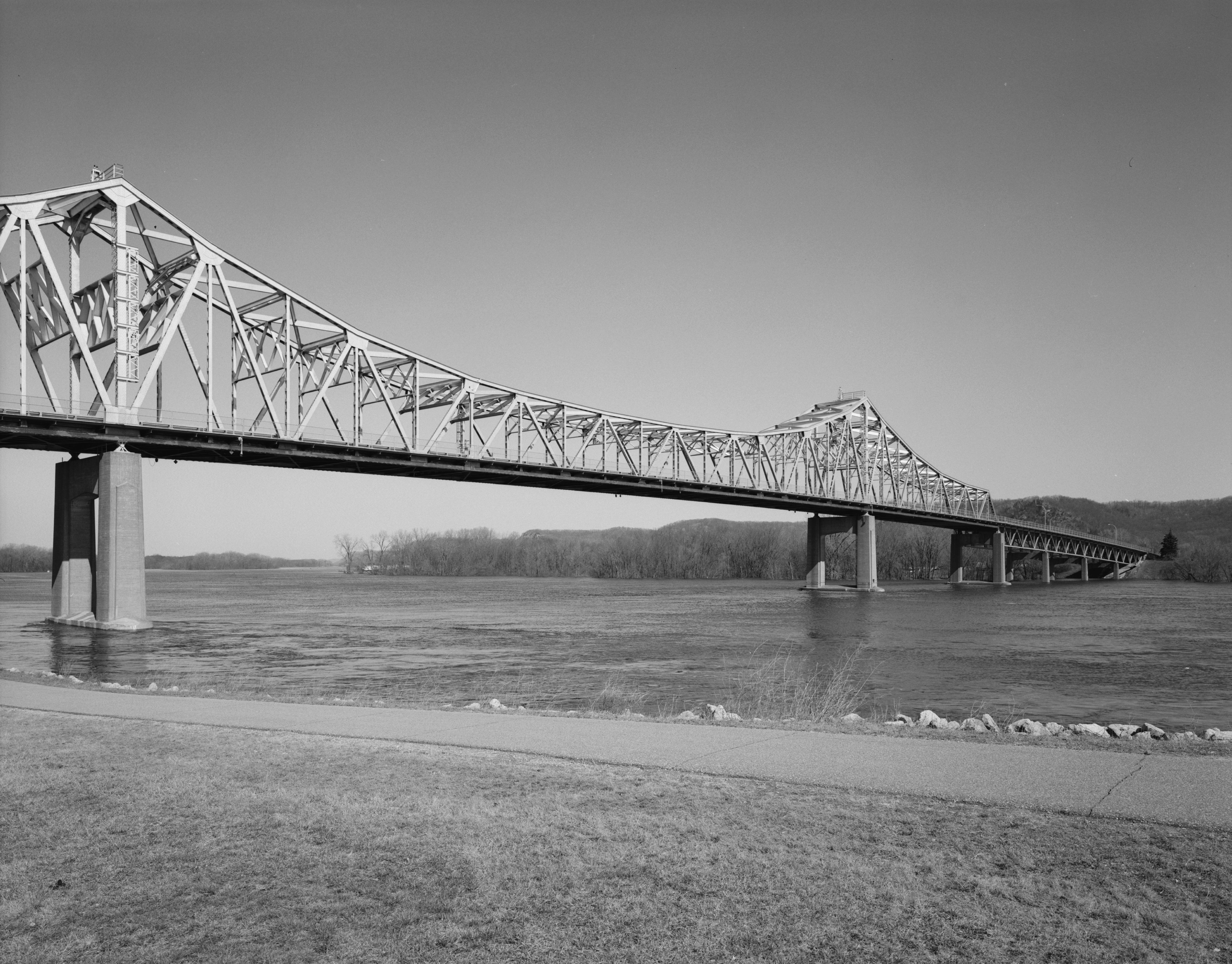
Image from when there was just one bridge

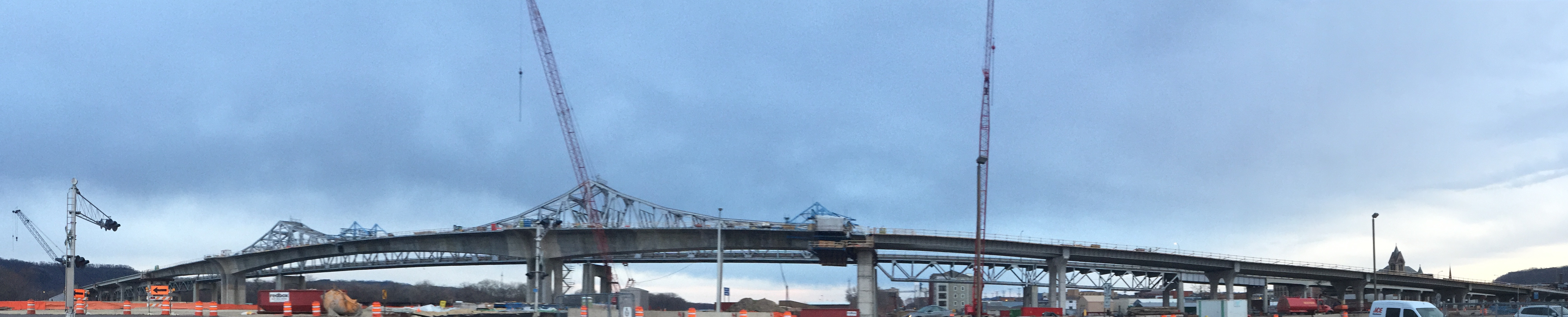
New Winona Bridge under construction
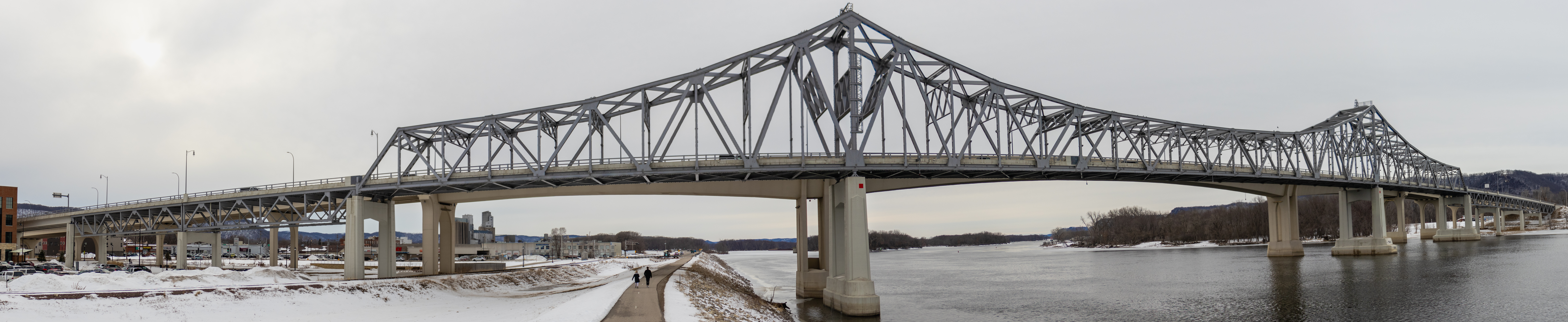

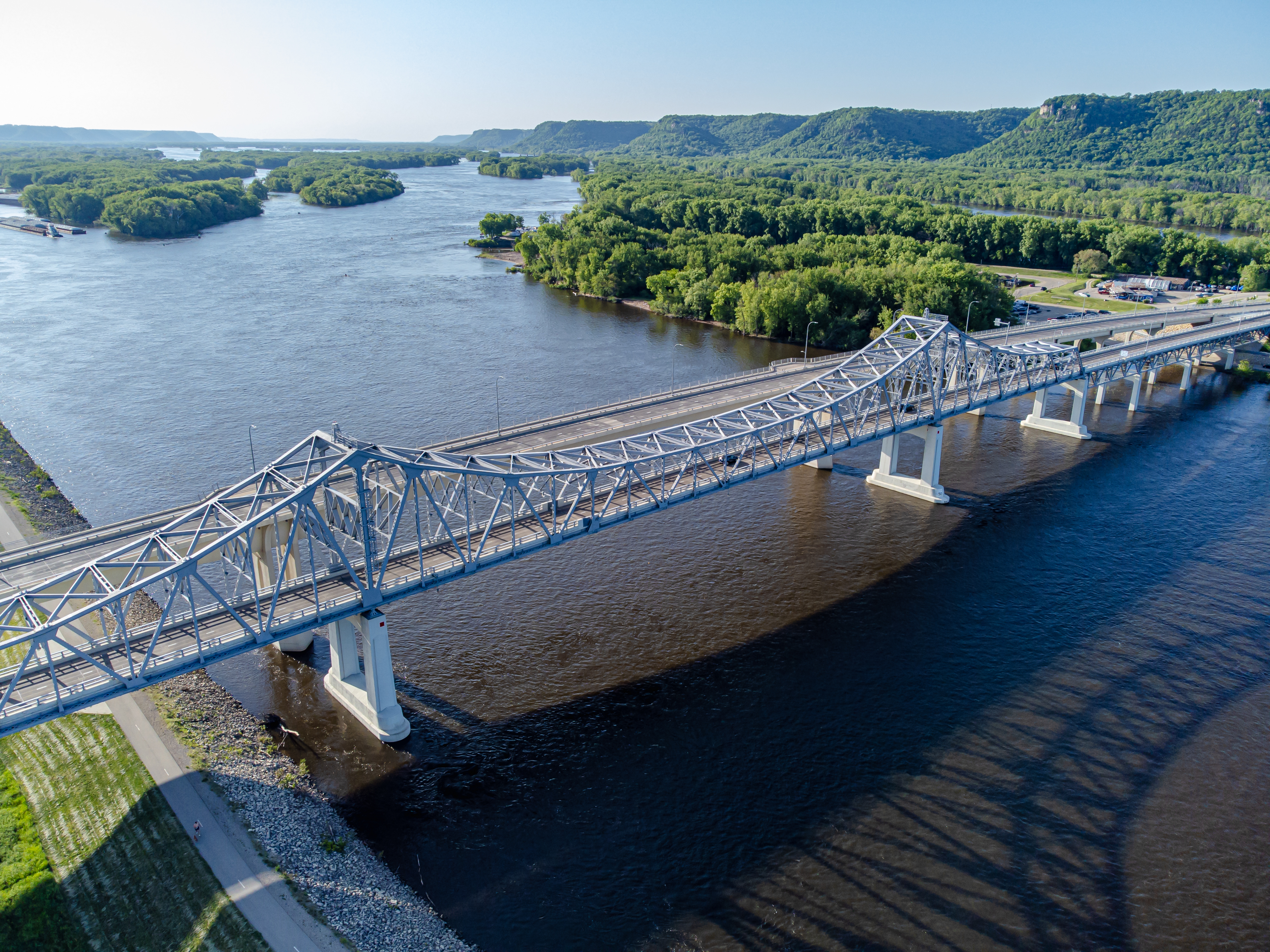
Winona, Minnesota bridge

== See also ==
- List of bridges documented by the Historic American Engineering Record in Minnesota
- List of bridges documented by the Historic American Engineering Record in Wisconsin
- List of crossings of the Upper Mississippi River
