= Minnesota State Highway 43 =

State highway in Minnesota, United States

Trunk Highway 43

- MN 43 highlighted in red

Route information
- Maintained by MnDOT
- Length: 44.952 mi (72.343 km)
- Existed: 1920–present

Major junctions
- South end: MN 44 at Mabel
- MN 16 at Rushford; MN 30 at Rushford; I-90 at Wilson Township; US 14 / US 61 at Winona
- North end: WIS 54 at the Mississippi River, at Winona, MN

Location
- Country: United States
- State: Minnesota
- Counties: Fillmore, Winona

Highway system
- Minnesota Trunk Highway System; Interstate; US; State; Legislative; Scenic
| ← MN 42 | → MN 44 |

Minnesota State Highway 43 (MN 43) is a highway in southeast Minnesota, which runs from its intersection with State Highway 44 in Mabel and continues north to its northern terminus at the Wisconsin state line at Winona, where it becomes Wisconsin Highway 54 upon crossing the Mississippi River.

Highway 43 is 45 miles (72 km) in length.

== Route description ==
State Highway 43 serves as a north–south route between Mabel, Rushford, and Winona in southeast Minnesota.

The route crosses the Root River in Fillmore County.

Highway 43 passes through the Richard J. Dorer State Forest.

The northern terminus of Highway 43 is at the Mississippi River at Winona, where the route becomes Wisconsin Highway 54 upon crossing the Main Channel and North Channel bridges over the river to Wisconsin.

== History ==
State Highway 43 was authorized in 1920 between Rushford and Winona. The remainder of the route between Rushford and Mabel was authorized in 1933.

Highway 43 was paved from Wilson to Winona by 1929. The only gravel section remaining by 1940 was south of Rushford. The route was completely paved by 1953.

A major project in the 1980s to rebuild Highway 43 from Interstate 90 to Winona as an expressway ran out of money. Only one carriageway was actually paved. There is still visible road bed and bridges east of the roadway in this section.

In response to the I-35W Bridge collapse in Minneapolis on August 1, 2007, all Minnesota bridges were ordered to be inspected. During an inspection, "gusset plate corrosion issues" were discovered in the Main Channel Bridge (Highway 43 / Highway 54), which crosses the Mississippi River between Winona, MN and nearby Fountain City, WI. The Main Channel Bridge (Bridge #5900) was closed to traffic on June 3, 2008. MnDOT stated that this was due to gusset plate corrosion issues similar to those that caused the I-35W Bridge to collapse. The Main Channel Bridge reopened to car traffic on June 14, 2008. Commercial vehicles were still directed to find alternate routes across the river. The bridge was scheduled for replacement in 2017, which was moved up to 2014. Both bridges were opened on July 1, 2019 and now are fully accessible.

== Major intersections ==
| County | Location | mi | km | Destinations | Notes |
|---|---|---|---|---|---|
| Fillmore | Newburg Township | 0.000 | 0.000 | MN 44 – Caledonia, US 52 | Southern terminus |
| Fillmore | Rushford Village | 21.677 | 34.886 | MN 16 east (Historic Bluff Country Scenic Byway) – Houston | South end of MN 16 overlap |
| Fillmore | Rushford | 22.211 | 35.745 | MN 16 west (Historic Bluff Country Scenic Byway) – Preston, Root River State Trail | North end of MN 16 overlap |
| Fillmore | Rushford | 22.401 | 36.051 | MN 30 west | |
| Winona | Warren Township | 32.381 | 52.112 | I-90 west – Austin | West end of I-90 overlap |
| Winona | Wilson Township | 35.186 | 56.626 | I-90 east – La Crosse | East end of I-90 overlap |
| Winona | Winona | 42.100 | 67.753 | US 14 / US 61 / Great River Road | Formal traffic/stop light; made into a roundabout in 2022 |
| Mississippi River | | 45.334 | 72.958 | Main Channel Bridge and North Channel Bridge; Minnesota–Wisconsin state line | |
| Buffalo | Town of Buffalo | | | WIS 54 east – Galesville | Continuation into Wisconsin |
1.000 mi = 1.609 km; 1.000 km = 0.621 mi: Concurrency terminus

== Gallery ==
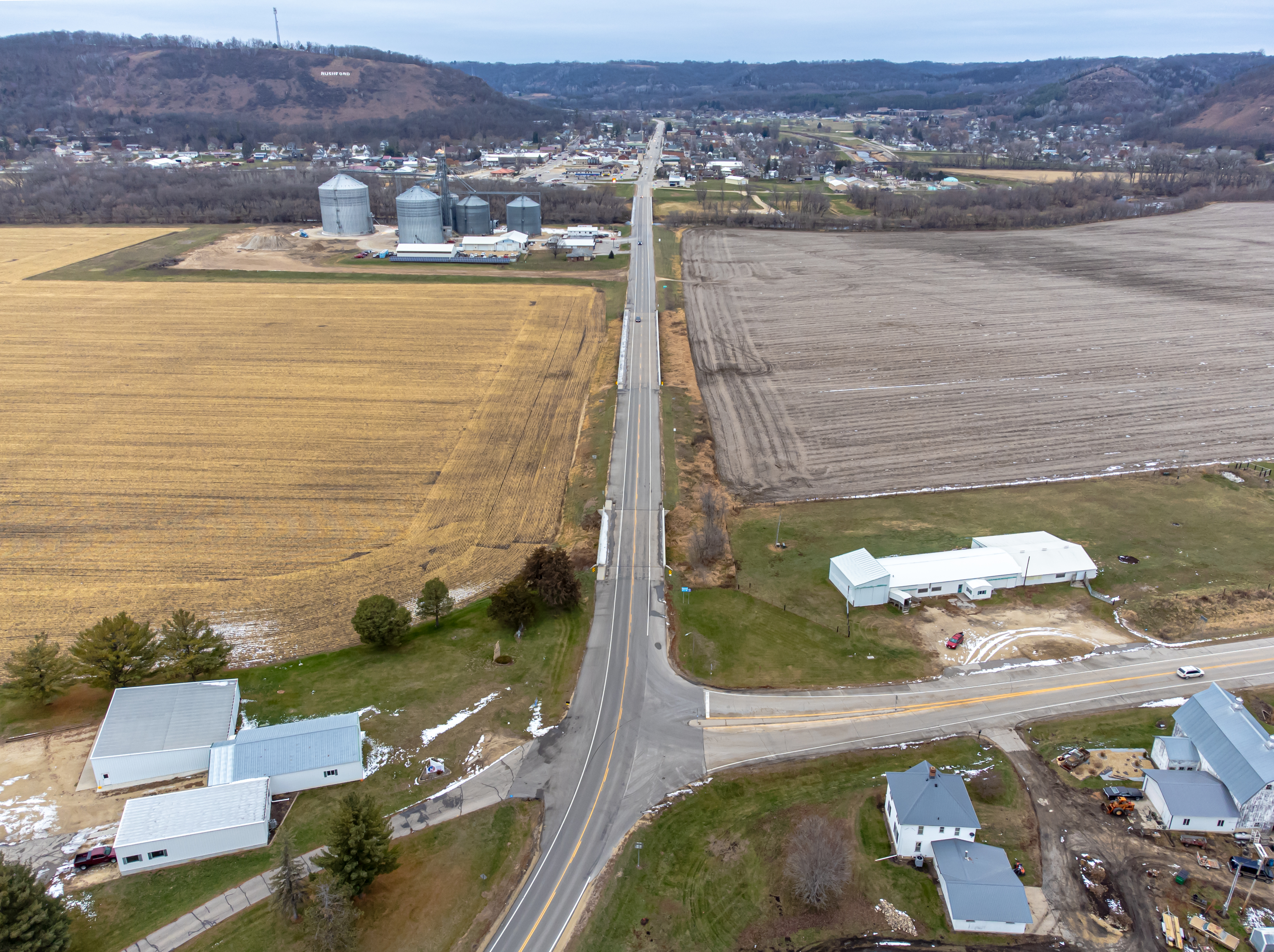
MN-43 and MN-16 junction in Rushford

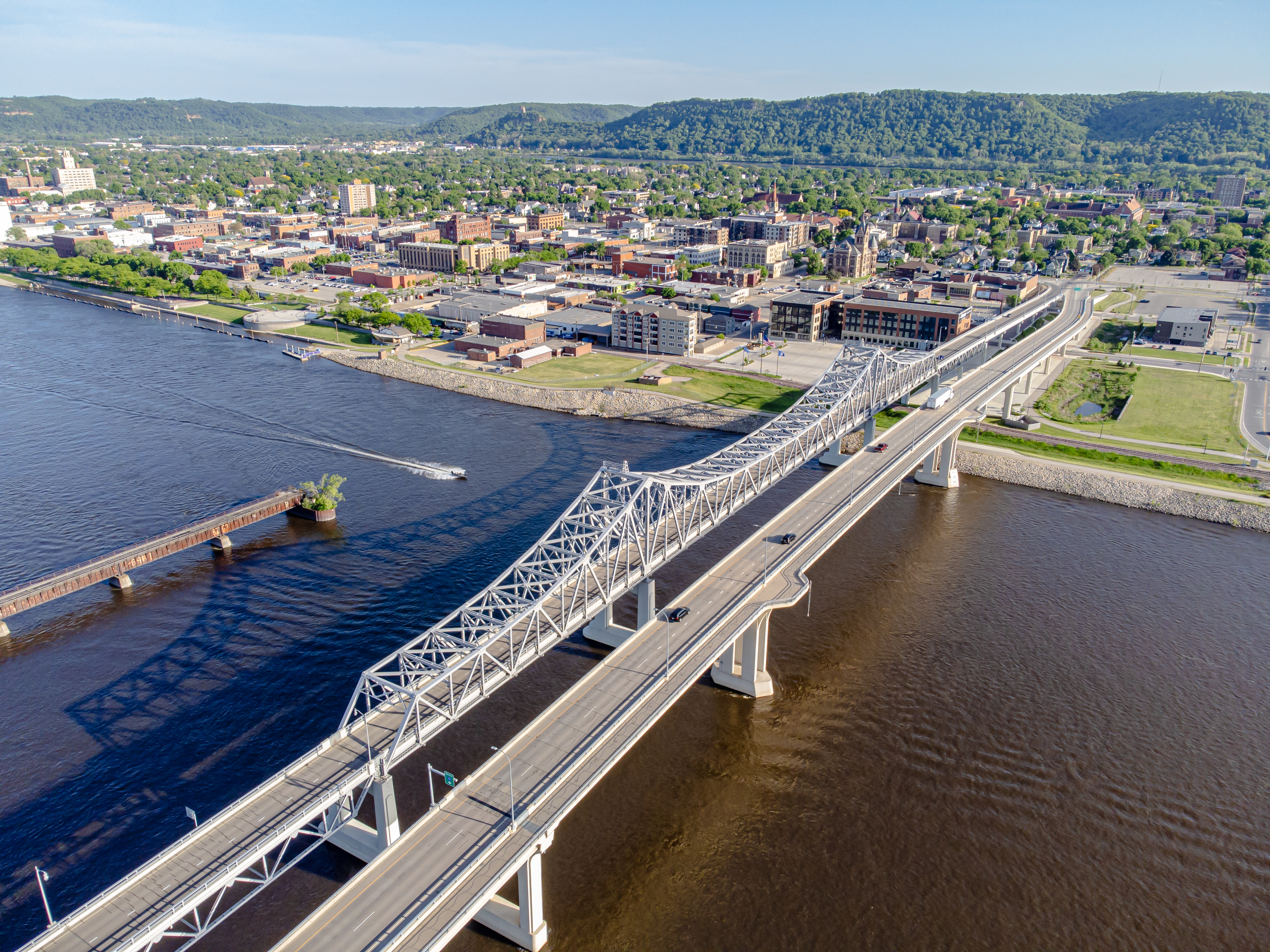
Northern terminus in Winona at the Main Channel Bridge

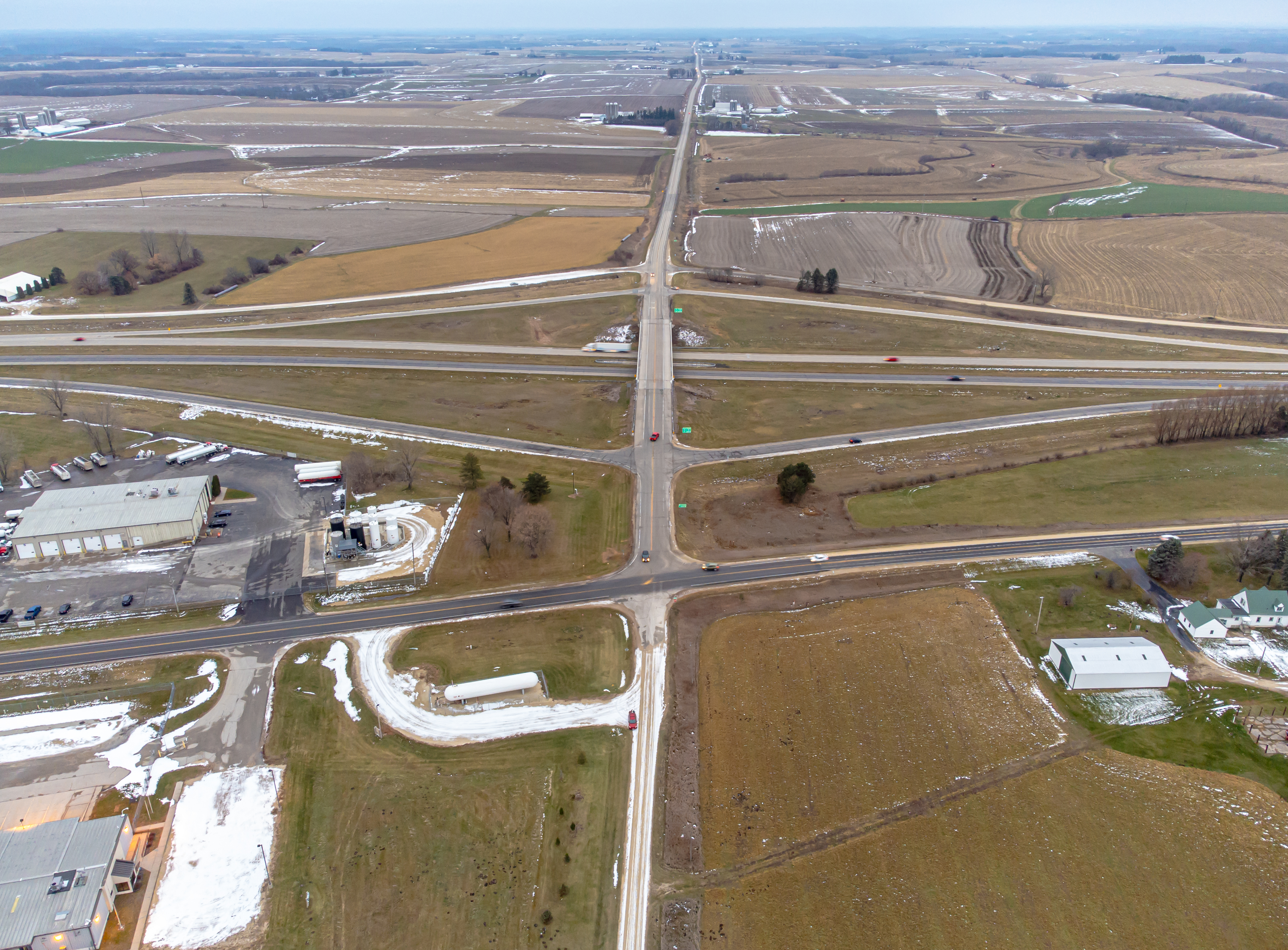
MN-43 and I-90 junction in Winona County
