= Wilson Township, Winona County, Minnesota =

Wilson Township, Minnesota
- Township
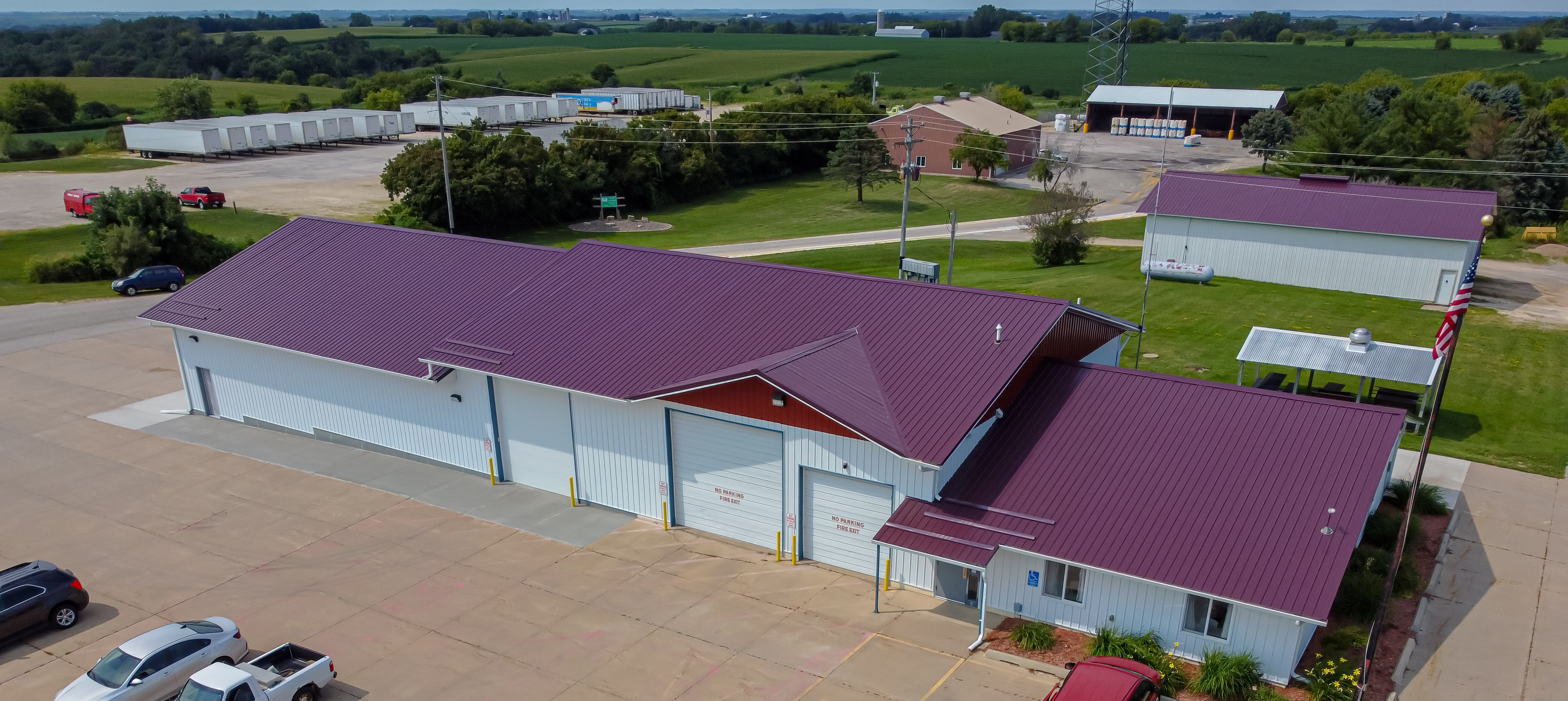
- Town hall in Wilson

- Location within the state of Minnesota Wilson Township, Minnesota (the United States)
- Coordinates: 43°59′40″N 91°38′4″W
- Country: United States
- State: Minnesota
- County: Winona

Area
  - Total: 35.0 sq mi (90.6 km^{2})
  - Land: 35.0 sq mi (90.6 km^{2})
  - Water: 0 sq mi (0.0 km^{2})
- Elevation: 902 ft (275 m)

Population (2010)
  - Total: 1,177
  - Density: 33.6/sq mi (13.0/km^{2})
- Time zone: UTC-6 (Central (CST))
  - Summer (DST): UTC-5 (CDT)
- ZIP code: 55987
- Area code: 507
- FIPS code: 27-70690
- GNIS feature ID: 0666009
- Website: Township website

Wilson Township is a township in Winona County, Minnesota, United States. The population was 1,177 at the 2010 census.

Wilson Township was organized in 1858, and probably named for Warren Wilson, a pioneer settler.

== Geography ==
According to the United States Census Bureau, the township has a total area of 35.0 square miles (90.6 km^{2}), all land.

== Demographics ==
As of the census of 2000, there were 1,152 people, 429 households, and 328 families residing in the township. The population density was 32.9 inhabitants per square mile (12.7/km^{2}). There were 446 housing units at an average density of 12.8/sq mi (4.9/km^{2}). The racial makeup of the township was 99.05% White, 0.09% Native American, 0.35% Asian, 0.35% from other races, and 0.17% from two or more races. Hispanic or Latino of any race were 0.52% of the population.

There were 429 households, out of which 32.6% had children under the age of 18 living with them, 69.2% were married couples living together, 3.3% had a female householder with no husband present, and 23.5% were non-families. 18.2% of all households were made up of individuals, and 7.2% had someone living alone who was 65 years of age or older. The average household size was 2.68 and the average family size was 3.08.

In the township the population was spread out, with 23.9% under the age of 18, 8.0% from 18 to 24, 24.1% from 25 to 44, 31.1% from 45 to 64, and 12.9% who were 65 years of age or older. The median age was 42 years. For every 100 females, there were 106.8 males. For every 100 females age 18 and over, there were 114.4 males.

The median income for a household in the township was $52,422, and the median income for a family was $56,750. Males had a median income of $35,000 versus $23,239 for females. The per capita income for the township was $25,832. About 0.9% of families and 2.0% of the population were below the poverty line, including none of those under the age of eighteen or sixty-five or over.
