= 1898 Minnesota lieutenant gubernatorial election =

- November 8, 1898
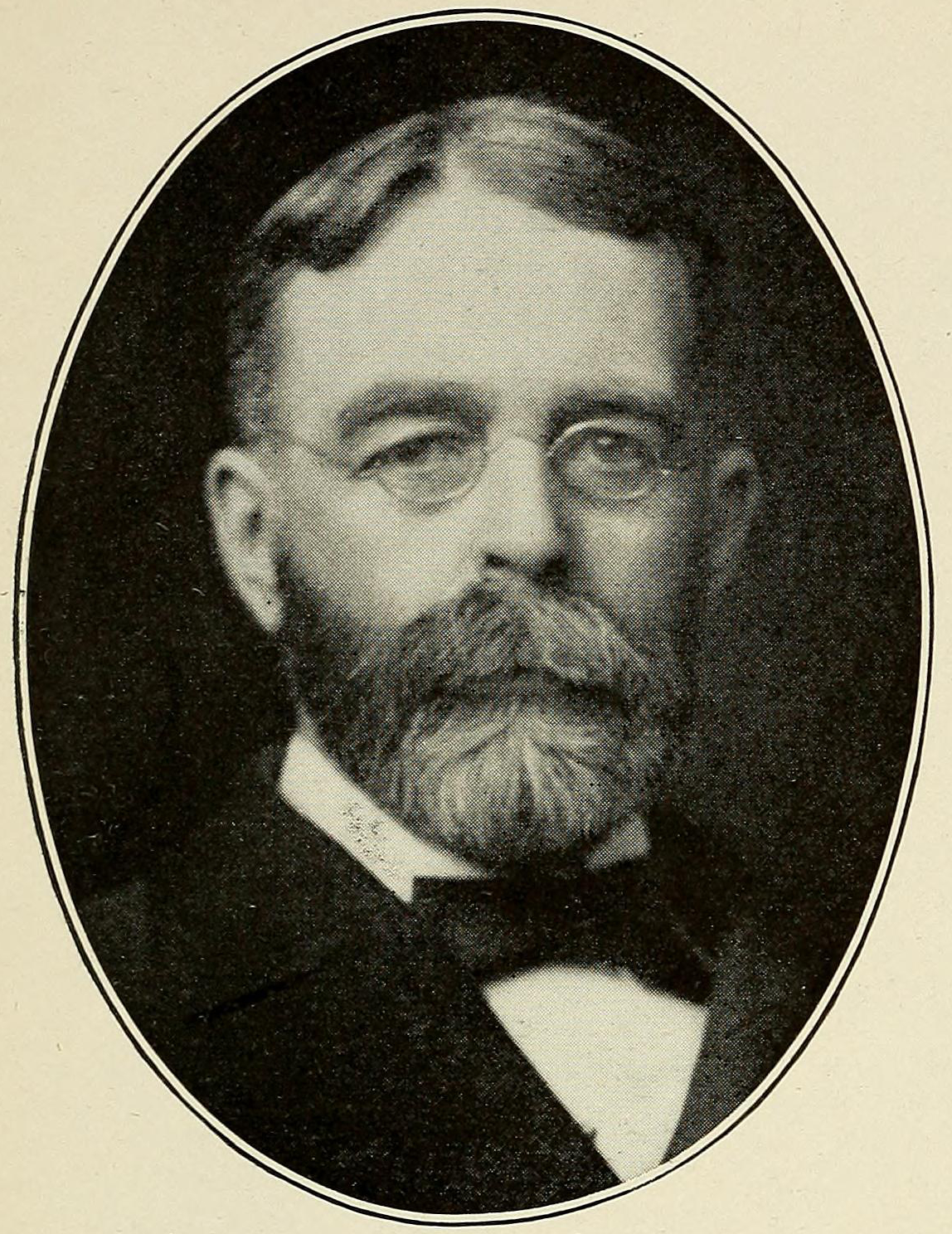

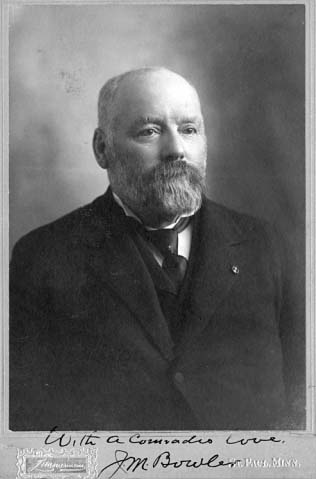
Nominee	Lyndon A. Smith	James Madison Bowler
Party	Republican	Democratic
Alliance		Populist
Popular vote	129,226	104,483
Percentage	52.23%	42.23%
Lieutenant Governor before election
John L. Gibbs
Republican
Elected Lieutenant Governor
Lyndon A. Smith
Republican

The 1898 Minnesota lieutenant gubernatorial election was held on November 8, 1898, to elect the lieutenant governor of Minnesota. Republican nominee Lyndon A. Smith defeated Democratic-People's nominee and candidate for lieutenant governor in the 1896 election James Madison Bowler, Prohibition nominee Addison H. Gilmore, and Midroad Populist nominee and former member of the United States House of Representatives from Minnesota's 5th district Kittel Halvorson.

== General election ==
On election day, November 8, 1898, Republican nominee Lyndon A. Smith won the election by a margin of 24,743 votes against his foremost opponent, Democratic-People's nominee James Madison Bowler, thereby retaining Republican control over the office of lieutenant governor. Smith was sworn in as the 15th lieutenant governor of Minnesota on January 3, 1899.

=== Results ===
Minnesota lieutenant gubernatorial election, 1898
Party	Candidate	Votes	%
Republican	Lyndon A. Smith	129,226	52.23
Democratic-People's	James Madison Bowler	104,483	42.23
Prohibition	Addison H. Gilmore	7,942	3.21
Midroad Populist	Kittel Halvorson	5,764	2.33
Total votes		247,415	100.00
Republican hold			
