= 1886 Minnesota lieutenant gubernatorial election =

- November 2, 1886
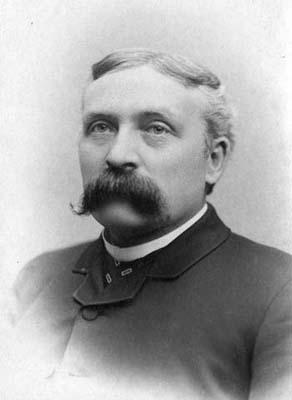

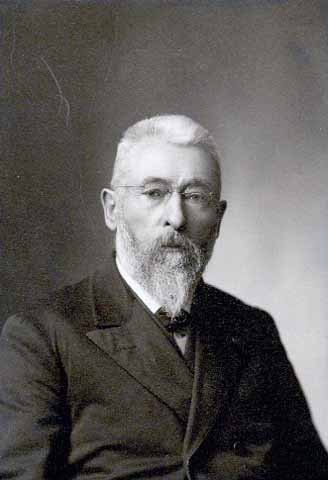
Nominee	Albert E. Rice	John Frank
Party	Republican	Democratic
Popular vote	114,038	97,028
Percentage	51.75%	44.03%
Lieutenant Governor before election
Charles A. Gilman
Republican
Elected Lieutenant Governor
Albert E. Rice
Republican

The 1886 Minnesota lieutenant gubernatorial election was held on November 2, 1886, to elect the lieutenant governor of Minnesota. Republican nominee and incumbent member of the Minnesota Senate Albert E. Rice defeated Democratic nominee and former member of the Minnesota House of Representatives John Frank and Prohibition nominee James P. Pinkham.

== General election ==
On election day, November 2, 1886, Republican nominee Albert E. Rice won the election by a margin of 17,010 votes against his foremost opponent, Democratic nominee John Frank, thereby retaining Republican control over the office of lieutenant governor. Rice was sworn in as the 10th lieutenant governor of Minnesota on January 4, 1887.

=== Results ===
Minnesota lieutenant gubernatorial election, 1886
Party	Candidate	Votes	%
Republican	Albert E. Rice	114,038	51.75
Democratic	John Frank	97,028	44.03
Prohibition	James P. Pinkham	9,271	4.20
	Scattering	38	0.02
Total votes		220,375	100.00
Republican hold			
