= Senator Durant =

Senator Durant may refer to:

- Edward W. Durant (1829–1918), Minnesota State Senate
- Isabelle Durant (born 1954), Senate of Belgium
- Peter Durant (born 1964/65), Massachusetts State Senate
- Tara Durant (born 1972), Virginia State Senate

== See also ==
- Senator Durand (disambiguation)
