= 1890 Minnesota lieutenant gubernatorial election =

- November 4, 1890
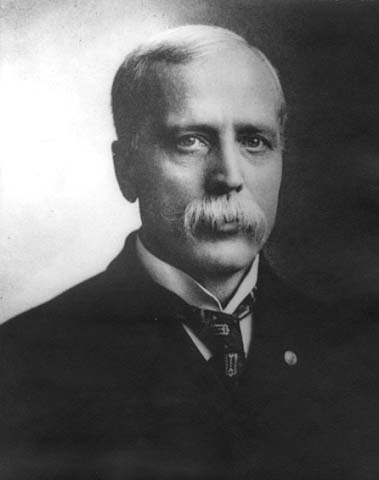

Nominee	Gideon S. Ives	Eggert G. Pahl	J.O. Barrett
Party	Republican	Democratic	Prohibition
Popular vote	96,515	85,337	57,003
Percentage	40.41%	35.73%	23.86%
Lieutenant Governor before election
Albert E. Rice
Republican
Elected Lieutenant Governor
Gideon S. Ives
Republican

The 1890 Minnesota lieutenant gubernatorial election was held on November 4, 1890, in order to elect the lieutenant governor of Minnesota. Republican nominee and incumbent member of the Minnesota Senate from the 27th district Gideon S. Ives defeated Democratic nominee Eggert G. Pahl and Prohibition nominee J.O. Barrett.

== General election ==
On election day, November 4, 1890, Republican nominee Gideon S. Ives won the election by a margin of 11,178 votes against his foremost opponent Democratic nominee Eggert G. Pahl, thereby retaining Republican control over the office of lieutenant governor. Ives was sworn in as the 11th lieutenant governor of Minnesota on January 5, 1891.

=== Results ===
Minnesota lieutenant gubernatorial election, 1890
Party	Candidate	Votes	%
Republican	Gideon S. Ives	96,515	40.41
Democratic	Eggert G. Pahl	85,337	35.73
Prohibition	J.O. Barrett	57,003	23.86
Total votes		238,855	100.00
Republican hold			
