= 1875 Minnesota lieutenant gubernatorial election =

- November 2, 1875
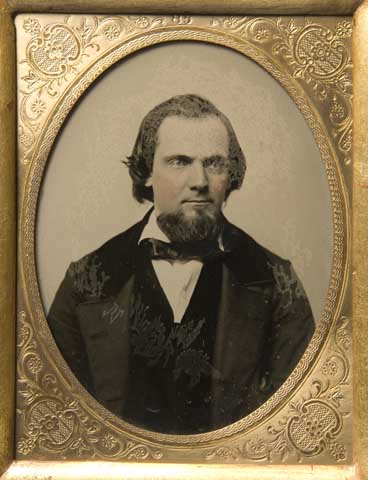

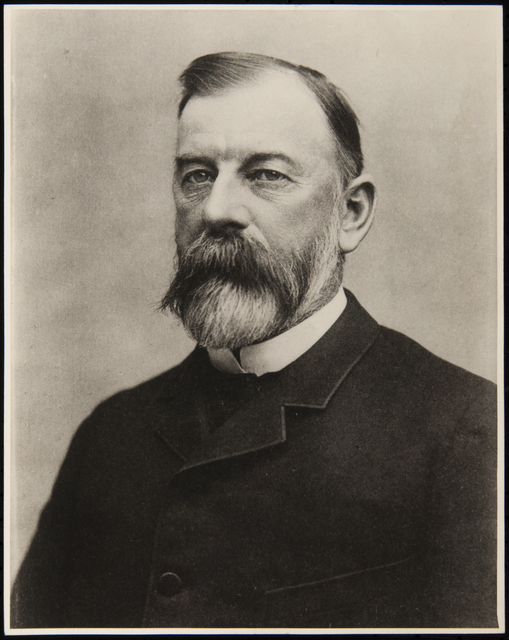
Nominee	James Wakefield	Edward W. Durant
Party	Republican	Democratic
Popular vote	43,874	34,090
Percentage	54.73%	42.52%
Lieutenant Governor before election
Alphonso Barto
Republican
Elected Lieutenant Governor
James Wakefield
Republican

The 1875 Minnesota lieutenant gubernatorial election was held on November 2, 1875, in order to elect the lieutenant governor of Minnesota. Republican nominee and former member of the Minnesota Senate James Wakefield defeated Democratic nominee and incumbent member of the Minnesota House of Representatives Edward W. Durant and Temperance nominee Jonah B. Tuttle.

== General election ==
On election day, November 2, 1875, Republican nominee James Wakefield won the election by a margin of 9,784 votes against his foremost opponent Democratic nominee Edward W. Durant, thereby retaining Republican control over the office of lieutenant governor. Wakefield was sworn in as the 8th lieutenant governor of Minnesota on January 7, 1876.

=== Candidates ===
- Edward W. Durant, member of the Minnesota House of Representatives (Democratic)
- James Wakefield, incumbent (Republican)
- Jonah B. Tuttle, Baptist clergyman (Prohibition, Anti-Monopoly)

=== Results ===
Minnesota lieutenant gubernatorial election, 1875
Party	Candidate	Votes	%
Republican	James Wakefield	43,874	54.73
Democratic	Edward W. Durant	34,090	42.52
Prohibition	Jonah B. Tuttle	2,205	2.75
Total votes		80,169	100.00
Republican hold			
