= 1892 Minnesota lieutenant gubernatorial election =

- November 8, 1892
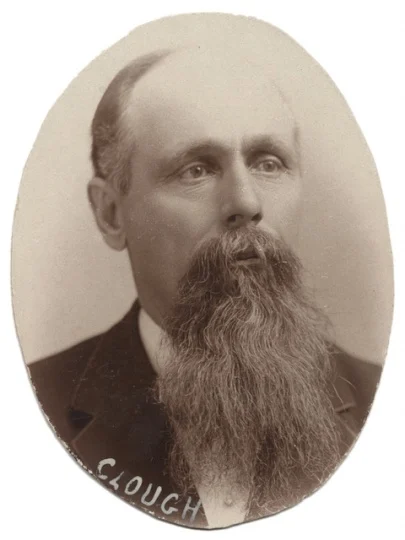

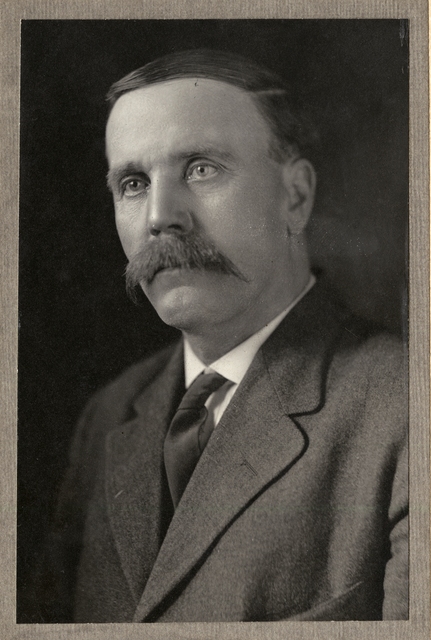

Nominee	David Marston Clough	Henry H. Hawkins
Party	Republican	Democratic
Popular vote	104,466	90,992
Percentage	42.30%	36.84%
Nominee	Swan Nelson	Ole Kron
Party	Populist	Prohibition
Popular vote	37,691	13,828
Percentage	15.26%	5.60%
Lieutenant Governor before election
Gideon S. Ives
Republican
Elected Lieutenant Governor
David Marston Clough
Republican

The 1892 Minnesota lieutenant gubernatorial election was held on November 8, 1892, in order to elect the lieutenant governor of Minnesota. Republican nominee and incumbent member of the Minnesota Senate David Marston Clough defeated Democratic nominee Henry H. Hawkins, People's nominee Swan Nelson and Prohibition nominee Ole Kron.

== General election ==
On election day, November 8, 1892, Republican nominee David Marston Clough won the election by a margin of 13,474 votes against his foremost opponent Democratic nominee Henry H. Hawkins, thereby retaining Republican control over the office of lieutenant governor. Clough was sworn in as the 12th lieutenant governor of Minnesota on January 3, 1893.

=== Results ===
Minnesota lieutenant gubernatorial election, 1892
Party	Candidate	Votes	%
Republican	David Marston Clough	104,466	42.30
Democratic	Henry H. Hawkins	90,992	36.84
Populist	Swan Nelson	37,691	15.26
Prohibition	Ole Kron	13,828	5.60
Total votes		246,977	100.00
Republican hold			
