= 1873 Minnesota lieutenant gubernatorial election =

- November 4, 1873
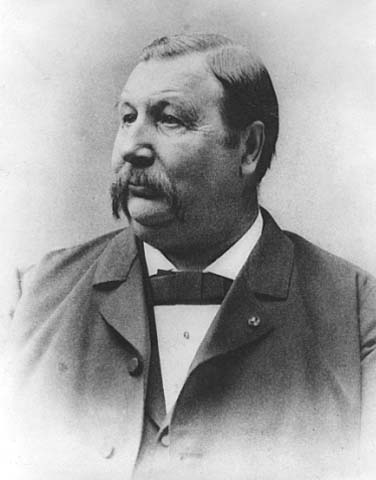

Nominee	Alphonso Barto	Ebenezer Ayres
Party	Republican	Democratic
Popular vote	41,352	35,639
Percentage	53.71%	46.29%
Lieutenant Governor before election
William H. Yale
Republican
Elected Lieutenant Governor
Alphonso Barto
Republican

The 1873 Minnesota lieutenant gubernatorial election was held on November 4, 1873, in order to elect the lieutenant governor of Minnesota. Republican nominee and incumbent member of the Minnesota House of Representatives from the 31st district Alphonso Barto defeated Democratic nominee Ebenezer Ayres.

== General election ==
On election day, November 4, 1873, Republican nominee Alphonso Barto won the election by a margin of 5,713 votes against his opponent Democratic nominee Ebenezer Ayres, thereby retaining Republican control over the office of lieutenant governor. Barto was sworn in as the 7th lieutenant governor of Minnesota on January 9, 1874.

=== Candidates ===
- Ebenezer Ayres, member of the Minnesota State House of Representatives (Democratic)
- Alphonso Barto, member of the Minnesota State House of Representatives (Republican)

=== Results ===
Minnesota lieutenant gubernatorial election, 1873
Party	Candidate	Votes	%
Republican	Alphonso Barto	41,352	53.71
Democratic	Ebenezer Ayres	35,639	46.29
	Scattering	4	0.01
Total votes		76,995	100.00
Republican hold			
