= 1869 Minnesota lieutenant gubernatorial election =

- November 2, 1869
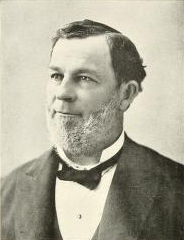

| Nominee | William H. Yale | James A. Wiswell |
| Party | Republican | Democratic |
| Popular vote | 29,456 | 21,745 |
| Percentage | 55.94% | 41.29% |
Lieutenant Governor before election
Thomas H. Armstrong
Republican
Elected Lieutenant Governor
William H. Yale
Republican

The 1869 Minnesota lieutenant gubernatorial election was held on November 2, 1869, to elect the lieutenant governor of Minnesota. Republican nominee and former member of the Minnesota State Senate from the 11th district William H. Yale defeated Democratic nominee James A. Wiswell and Temperance nominee and former member of the Minnesota State Senate John H. Stevens.

== General election ==
On election day, November 2, 1869, Republican nominee William H. Yale won the election by a margin of 7,711 votes against his foremost opponent, Democratic nominee James A. Wiswell, thereby retaining Republican control over the office of lieutenant governor. Yale was sworn in as the 6th lieutenant governor of Minnesota on January 7, 1870.

=== Candidates ===
- John H. Stevens, member of the Minnesota House of Representatives (Prohibition)
- James A. Wiswell, member of the Minnesota House of Representatives (Democratic)
- William H. Yale, member of the Minnesota State Senate (Republican)

=== Results ===
Minnesota lieutenant gubernatorial election, 1869
| Party | Candidate | Votes | % |
|---|---|---|---|
| Republican | William H. Yale | 29,456 | 55.94 |
| Democratic | James A. Wiswell | 21,745 | 41.29 |
| Prohibition | John H. Stevens | 1,428 | 2.71 |
| | Scattering | 30 | 0.06 |
| Total votes | | 52,659 | 100.00 |
| Republican hold | | | |
