= 1879 Minnesota lieutenant gubernatorial election =

- November 4, 1879
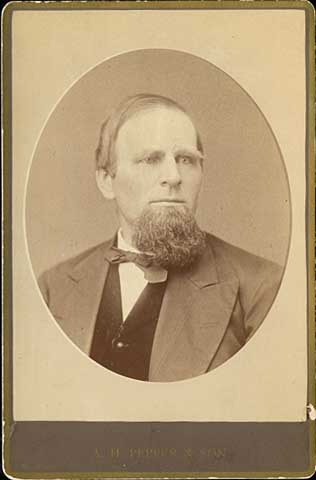

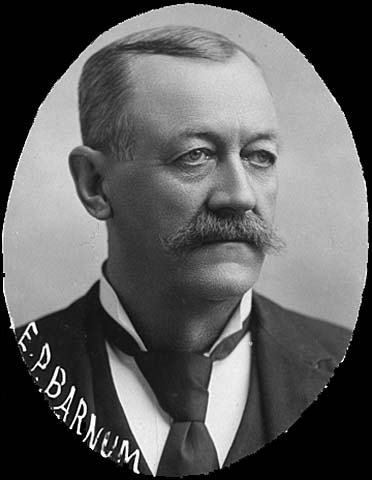
Nominee	Charles A. Gilman	Edward P. Barnum
Party	Republican	Democratic
Popular vote	59,763	38,736
Percentage	56.23%	36.44%
Lieutenant Governor before election
James Wakefield
Republican
Elected Lieutenant Governor
Charles A. Gilman
Republican

The 1879 Minnesota lieutenant gubernatorial election was held on November 4, 1879, in order to elect the lieutenant governor of Minnesota. Republican nominee and incumbent member of the Minnesota House of Representatives from the 31st district Charles A. Gilman defeated Democratic nominee Edward P. Barnum, Greenback Labor nominee Isaac M. Westfall and Prohibition nominee S.B. Williams.

== General election ==
On election day, November 4, 1879, Republican nominee Charles A. Gilman won the election by a margin of 21,027 votes against his foremost opponent, Democratic nominee Edward P. Barnum, thereby retaining Republican control over the office of lieutenant governor. Gilman was sworn in as the 9th lieutenant governor of Minnesota on January 10, 1880.

=== Candidates ===
- Edward P. Barnum, Stearns County commissioner (Democratic)
- Charles A. Gilman, speaker of the Minnesota House of Representatives (Republican)
- Isaac M. Westfall, former member of the Minnesota Senate (Greenback)
- Samuel B. Williams, farmer (Prohibition)

=== Results ===
Minnesota lieutenant gubernatorial election, 1879
Party	Candidate	Votes	%
Republican	Charles A. Gilman	59,763	56.23
Democratic	Edward P. Barnum	38,736	36.44
Greenback	Isaac M. Westfall	4,148	3.90
Prohibition	S.B. Williams	3,642	3.43
Total votes		106,289	100.00
Republican hold			
