= 1857 Minnesota lieutenant gubernatorial election =

- October 13, 1857
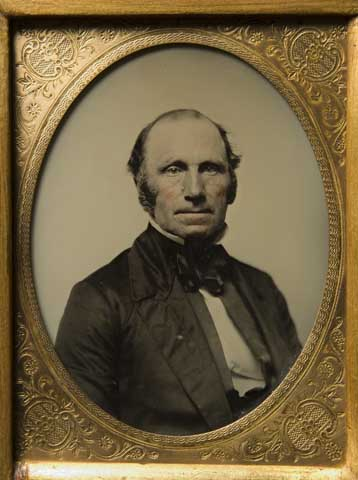

Nominee	William Holcombe	John Ide
Party	Democratic	Republican
Popular vote	18,210	17,055
Percentage	51.64%	48.36%
Lieutenant Governor before election
Office established
Elected Lieutenant Governor
William Holcombe
Democratic

The 1857 Minnesota lieutenant gubernatorial election was held on October 13, 1857, in order to elect the first lieutenant governor of Minnesota upon Minnesotan statehood on May 11, 1858. Democratic nominee William Holcombe defeated Republican nominee John Ide. This election's results were likely fraudulent, due to manipulation by the Dakota Land Company.

== General election ==
On election day, October 13, 1857, Democratic nominee William Holcombe won the election by a margin of 1,155 votes against his opponent, Republican nominee John Ide, thereby gaining Democratic control over the office of lieutenant governor. Holcombe was sworn in as the first lieutenant governor of Minnesota on May 24, 1858.

=== Candidates ===
- William Holcombe, steamboat captain (Democrat)
- John Ide, member of the Minnesota Territorial Legislature (Republican)

=== Results ===
Minnesota lieutenant gubernatorial election, 1857
Party	Candidate	Votes	%
Democratic	William Holcombe	18,210	51.64
Republican	John Ide	17,055	48.36
Total votes		35,265	100.00
Democratic gain from			
