= 1883 Minnesota lieutenant gubernatorial election =

- November 6, 1883
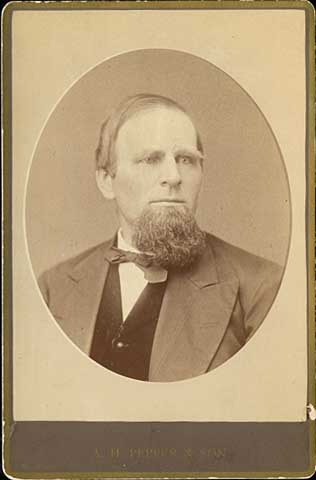

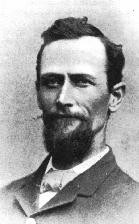
| Nominee | Charles A. Gilman | Randolph L. Frazee |
| Party | Republican | Democratic |
| Popular vote | 75,021 | 55,561 |
| Percentage | 55.26% | 40.93% |
Lieutenant Governor before election
Charles A. Gilman
Republican
Elected Lieutenant Governor
Charles A. Gilman
Republican

The 1883 Minnesota lieutenant gubernatorial election was held on November 6, 1883, to elect the lieutenant governor of Minnesota. Republican incumbent Charles A. Gilman defeated Democratic nominee Randolph L. Frazee and Prohibition Party nominee Cornelius B. Shove.

== General election ==
On election day, November 6, 1883, Republican nominee Charles A. Gilman won re-election by a margin of 19,460 votes against his foremost opponent, Democratic nominee Randolph L. Frazee, thereby retaining Republican control over the office of lieutenant governor. Gilman was sworn in for his third term on January 10, 1884.

=== Results ===
Minnesota lieutenant gubernatorial election, 1883
| Party | Candidate | Votes | % |
|---|---|---|---|
| Republican | Charles A. Gilman (incumbent) | 75,021 | 55.26 |
| Democratic | Randolph L. Frazee | 55,561 | 40.93 |
| Prohibition | Cornelius B. Shove | 5,001 | 3.68 |
| | Thomas A. Clark (write-in) | 90 | 0.07 |
| | Scattering | 79 | 0.06 |
| Total votes | | 135,552 | 100.00 |
| Republican hold | | | |
