= 1896 Minnesota lieutenant gubernatorial election =

1896 election in Minnesota

- November 3, 1896
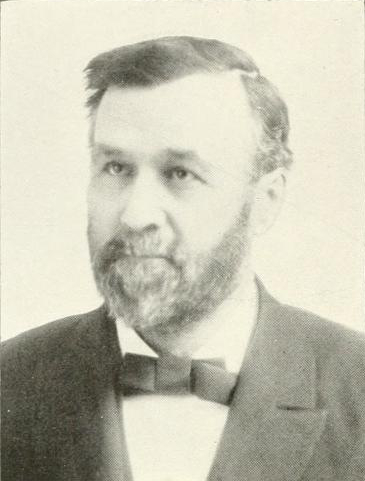

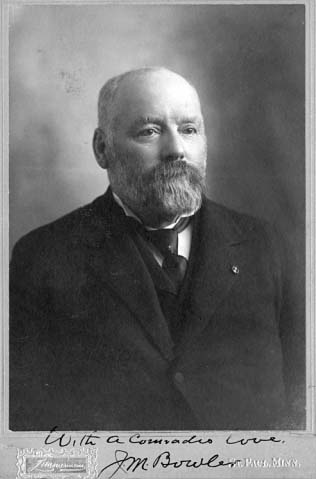
Nominee	John L. Gibbs	James Madison Bowler
Party	Republican	Democratic-People's
Popular vote	178,381	141,240
Percentage	54.63%	43.25%
Lieutenant Governor before election
Frank A. Day
Republican
Elected Lieutenant Governor
John L. Gibbs
Republican

The 1896 Minnesota lieutenant gubernatorial election was held on November 3, 1896, to elect the lieutenant governor of Minnesota. Republican nominee and incumbent member of the Minnesota House of Representatives John L. Gibbs defeated Democratic-People's nominee James Madison Bowler and Prohibition nominee Clarence Wedge.

== General election ==
On election day, November 3, 1896, Republican nominee John L. Gibbs won the election by a margin of 37,141 votes against his foremost opponent, Democratic-People's nominee James Madison Bowler, thereby retaining Republican control over the office of lieutenant governor. Gibbs was sworn in as the 14th lieutenant governor of Minnesota on January 5, 1897.

=== Results ===
Minnesota lieutenant gubernatorial election, 1896
Party	Candidate	Votes	%
Republican	John L. Gibbs	178,381	54.63
Democratic-People's	James Madison Bowler	141,240	43.25
Prohibition	Clarence Wedge	6,917	2.12
Total votes		326,538	100.00
Republican hold			
