= 1900 Minnesota lieutenant gubernatorial election =

- November 6, 1900
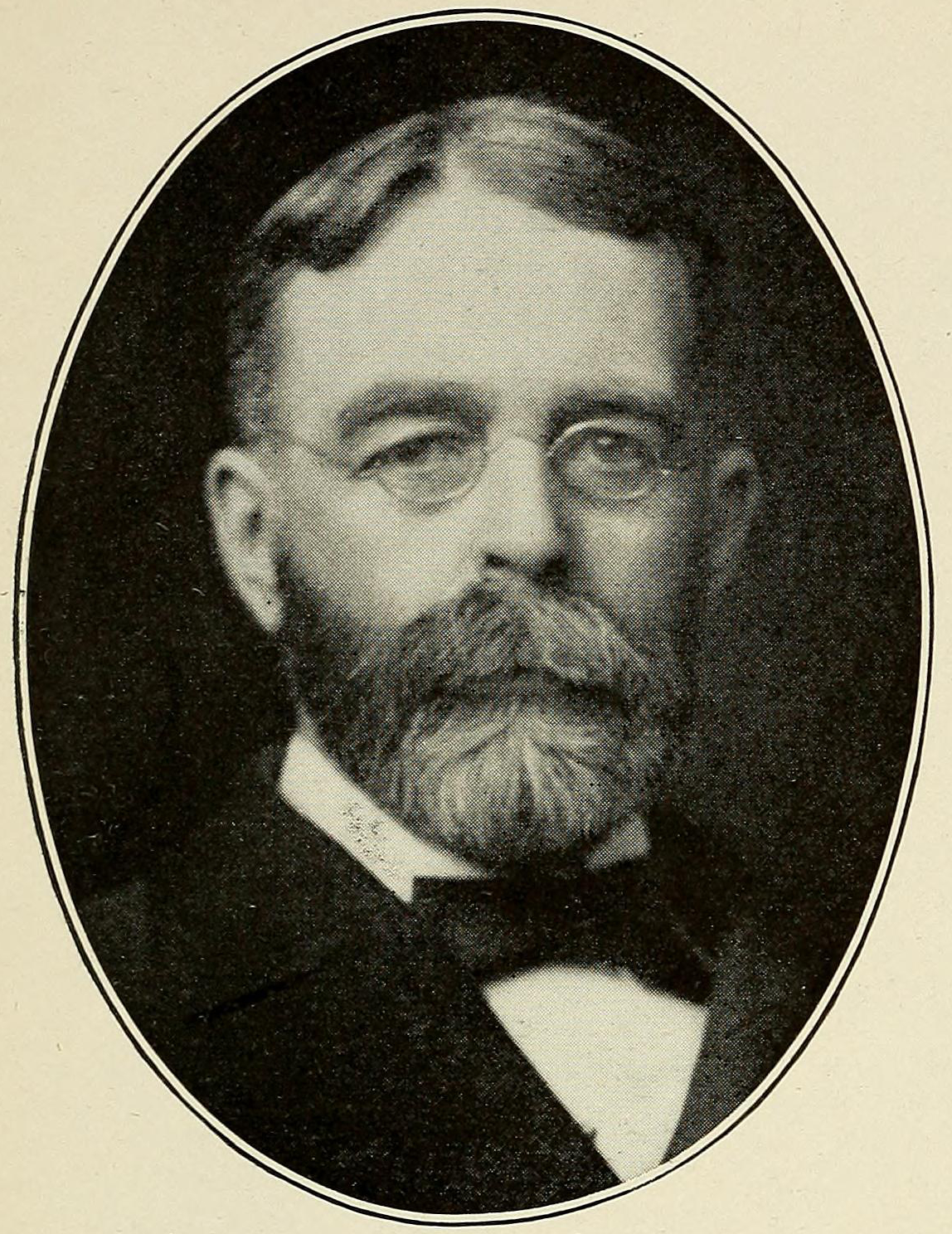

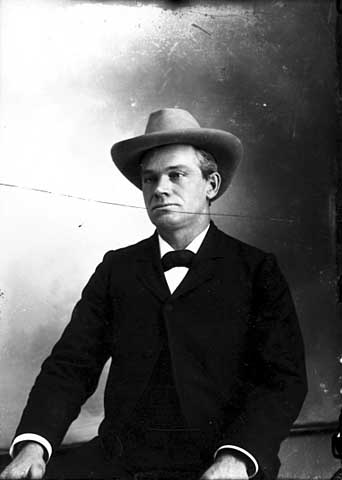
Nominee	Lyndon A. Smith	Thomas J. Meighen
Party	Republican	Populist
Alliance		Democratic
Popular vote	169,503	126,419
Percentage	55.34%	41.27%
Lieutenant Governor before election
Lyndon A. Smith
Republican
Elected Lieutenant Governor
Lyndon A. Smith
Republican

The 1900 Minnesota lieutenant gubernatorial election was held on November 6, 1900, to elect the lieutenant governor of Minnesota. Incumbent Republican Lieutenant Governor Lyndon A. Smith defeated Democratic-People's nominee Thomas J. Meighen, Prohibition nominee C.B. Wilkinson and Midroad Populist nominee Erick G. Wallinder.

== General election ==
On election day, November 6, 1900, Republican nominee Lyndon A. Smith won re-election by a margin of 43,084 votes against his foremost opponent, Democratic-People's nominee Thomas J. Meighen, thereby retaining Republican control over the office of lieutenant governor. Smith was sworn in for his second term on January 7, 1901.

=== Results ===
Minnesota lieutenant gubernatorial election, 1900
Party	Candidate	Votes	%
Republican	Lyndon A. Smith (incumbent)	169,503	55.34
Populist	Thomas J. Meighen	126,419	41.27
Prohibition	C.B. Wilkinson	8,364	2.73
Midroad Populist	Erick G. Wallinder	2,008	0.66
	Scattering	2	0.00
Total votes		306,296	100.00
Republican hold			
