= 1871 Minnesota lieutenant gubernatorial election =

- November 7, 1871
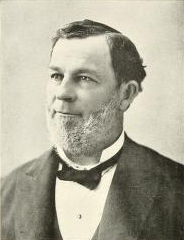

Nominee	William H. Yale	David L. Buell
Party	Republican	Democratic
Popular vote	47,039	30,169
Percentage	60.82%	39.01%
Lieutenant Governor before election
William H. Yale
Republican
Elected Lieutenant Governor
William H. Yale
Republican

The 1871 Minnesota lieutenant gubernatorial election was held on November 7, 1871, to elect the lieutenant governor of Minnesota. Republican nominee and incumbent lieutenant governor William H. Yale defeated Democratic nominee David L. Buell and Temperance nominee William A. Bentley.

== General election ==
On election day, November 7, 1871, Republican nominee William H. Yale won re-election by a margin of 16,870 votes against his foremost opponent, Democratic nominee David L. Buell, thereby retaining Republican control over the office of lieutenant governor. Yale was sworn in for his second term on January 7, 1872.

=== Candidates ===
- William A. Bentley, surgeon (Prohibition)
- David L. Buell, member of the Minnesota Senate (Democratic)
- William H. Yale, incumbent (Republican)

=== Results ===
Minnesota lieutenant gubernatorial election, 1871
Party	Candidate	Votes	%
Republican	William H. Yale (incumbent)	47,039	60.82
Democratic	David L. Buell	30,169	39.01
Prohibition	William A. Bentley	132	0.17
Total votes		77,340	100.00
Republican hold			
