= 1881 Minnesota lieutenant gubernatorial election =

- November 8, 1881
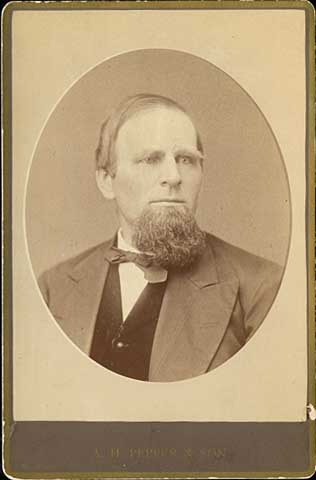

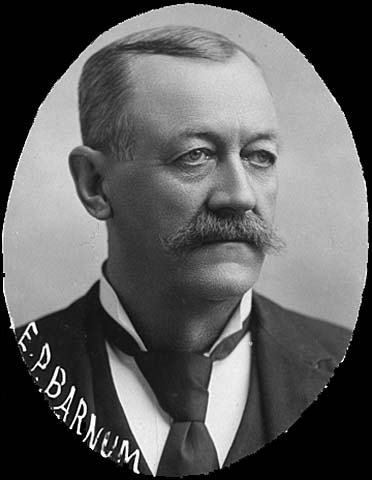
| Nominee | Charles A. Gilman | Edward P. Barnum |
| Party | Republican | Democratic |
| Popular vote | 66,677 | 35,990 |
| Percentage | 62.89% | 33.95% |
Lieutenant Governor before election
Charles A. Gilman
Minnesota Republican Party
Elected Lieutenant Governor
Charles A. Gilman
Minnesota Republican Party

The 1881 Minnesota lieutenant gubernatorial election was held on November 8, 1881, to elect the lieutenant governor of Minnesota. It was a rematch between Republican nominee Charles A. Gilman, now the incumbent, who defeated Democratic nominee Edward P. Barnum, Greenback Labor nominee Alexander P. Lane and Prohibition nominee George B. Kingsley.

== General election ==
On election day, November 8, 1881, Republican nominee Charles A. Gilman won re-election by a margin of 30,687 votes over Barnum, thereby retaining Republican control over the office of lieutenant governor. Gilman was sworn in for his second term on January 10, 1882.

=== Candidates ===
- Edward P. Barnum, Stearns County commissioner (Democratic)
- Charles A. Gilman, incumbent, former speaker of the Minnesota House of Representatives (Republican)
- George B. Kingsley, former member of the Minnesota House of Representatives (Prohibition)
- Alexander P. Lane, farmer (Greenback)

=== Results ===
Minnesota lieutenant gubernatorial election, 1881
| Party | Candidate | Votes | % |
|---|---|---|---|
| Republican | Charles A. Gilman (incumbent) | 66,677 | 62.89 |
| Democratic | Edward P. Barnum | 35,990 | 33.95 |
| Greenback | Alexander P. Lane | 2,591 | 2.44 |
| Prohibition | George B. Kingsley | 768 | 0.72 |
| Total votes | | 106,026 | 100.00 |
| Republican hold | | | |
