= 1877 Minnesota lieutenant gubernatorial election =

- November 6, 1877
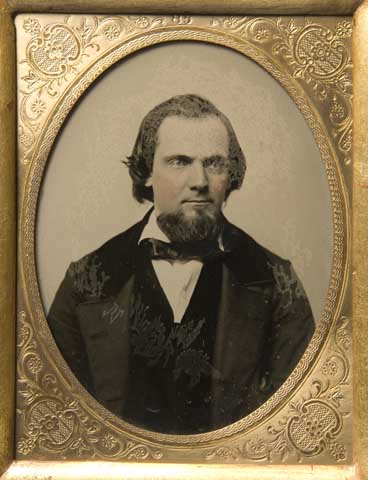

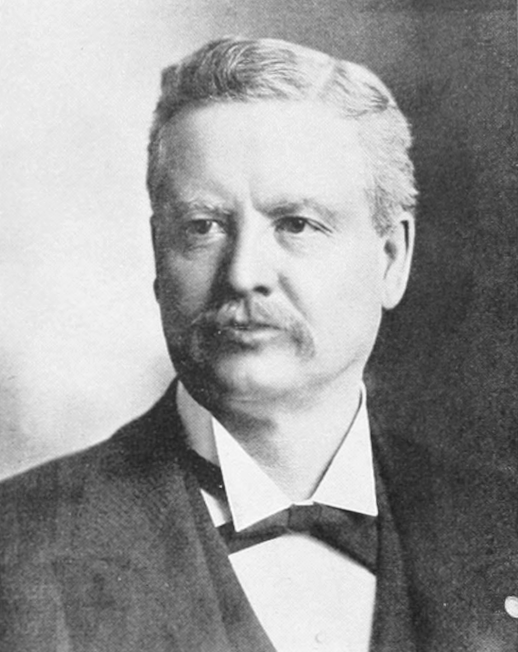
Nominee	James Wakefield	Albert Alonzo Ames
Party	Republican	Democratic
Popular vote	55,346	37,245
Percentage	58.92%	39.65%
Lieutenant Governor before election
James Wakefield
Republican
Elected Lieutenant Governor
James Wakefield
Republican

The 1877 Minnesota lieutenant gubernatorial election was held on November 6, 1877,to elect the lieutenant governor of Minnesota. Republican nominee and incumbent lieutenant governor James Wakefield defeated Democratic nominee and former Mayor of Minneapolis Albert Alonzo Ames and Prohibition nominee Phineas A. Jewell.

== General election ==
On election day, November 6, 1877, Republican nominee James Wakefield won re-election by a margin of 18,101 votes against his foremost opponent Democratic nominee Albert Alonzo Ames, thereby retaining Republican control over the office of lieutenant governor. Wakefield was sworn in for his second term on January 7, 1878.

=== Candidates ===
- Albert Alonzo Ames, mayor of Minneapolis (Democratic)
- Phineas A. Jewell, horticulturist (Prohibition)
- James Wakefield, incumbent (Republican)

=== Results ===
Minnesota lieutenant gubernatorial election, 1877
Party	Candidate	Votes	%
Republican	James Wakefield (incumbent)	55,346	58.92
Democratic	Albert Alonzo Ames	37,245	39.65
Prohibition	Phineas A. Jewell	1,346	1.43
	Scattering	2	0.00
Total votes		93,939	100.00
Republican hold			
