= 1859 Minnesota lieutenant gubernatorial election =

- October 11, 1859
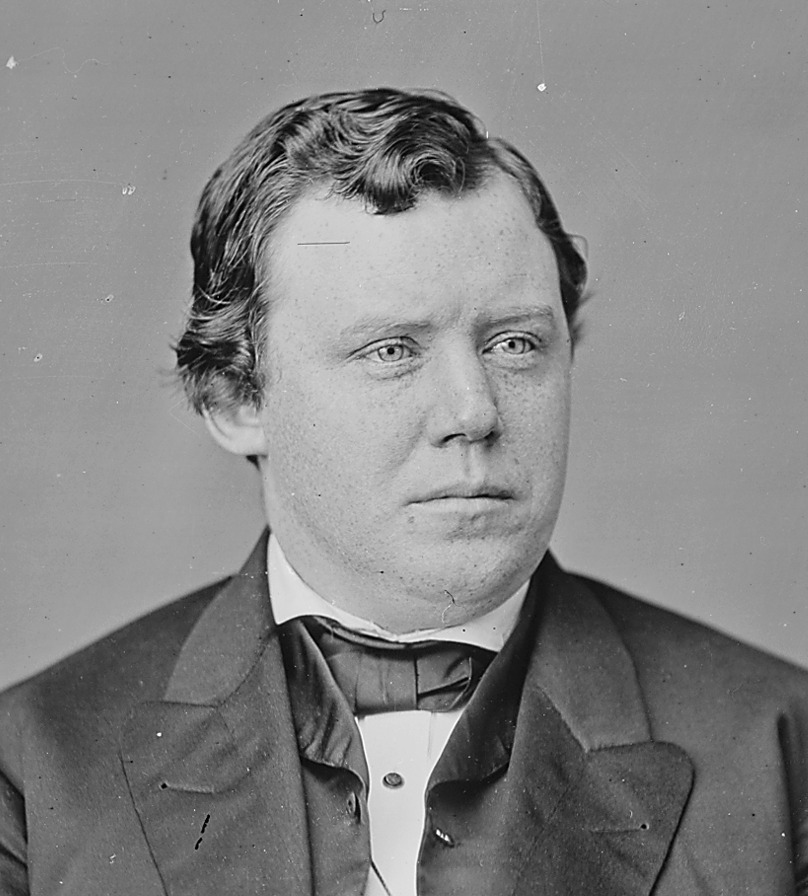

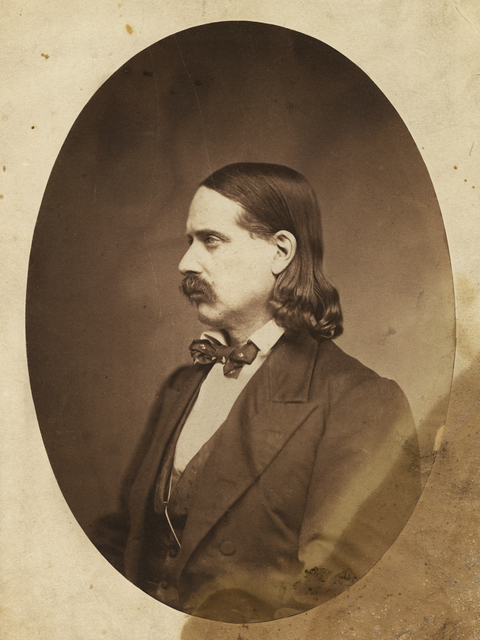
Nominee	Ignatius L. Donnelly	Sylvanus Lowry
Party	Republican	Democratic
Popular vote	20,917	17,670
Percentage	54.21%	45.79%
Lieutenant Governor before election
William Holcombe
Democratic
Elected Lieutenant Governor
Ignatius L. Donnelly
Republican

The 1859 Minnesota lieutenant gubernatorial election was held on October 11, 1859, in order to elect the lieutenant governor of Minnesota. Republican nominee Ignatius L. Donnelly defeated Democratic nominee Sylvanus Lowry.

== General election ==
On election day, October 11, 1859, Republican nominee Ignatius L. Donnelly won the election by a margin of 3,247 votes against his opponent Democratic nominee Sylvanus Lowry, thereby gaining Republican control over the office of lieutenant governor. Donnelly was sworn in as the 2nd lieutenant governor of Minnesota on January 2, 1860.

=== Candidates ===
- Ignatius Donnelly, attorney (Republican)
- Sylvanus Lowry, former territorial councilor, former mayor of St. Cloud, Minnesota (Democratic)

=== Results ===
Minnesota lieutenant gubernatorial election, 1859
Party	Candidate	Votes	%
Republican	Ignatius L. Donnelly	20,917	54.21
Democratic	Sylvanus Lowry	17,670	45.79
Total votes		38,587	100.00
Republican gain from Democratic			
