= 1894 Minnesota lieutenant gubernatorial election =

- November 6, 1894
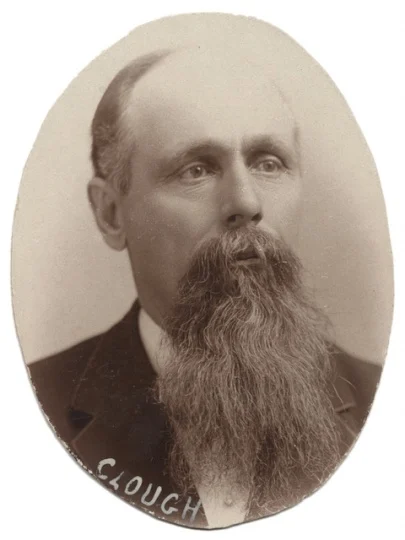

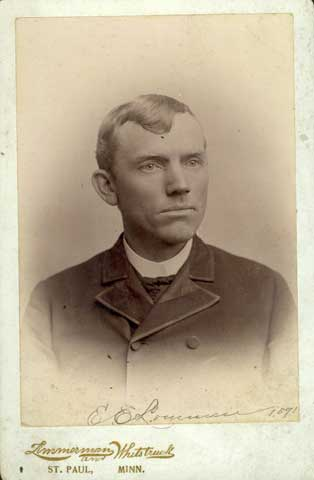

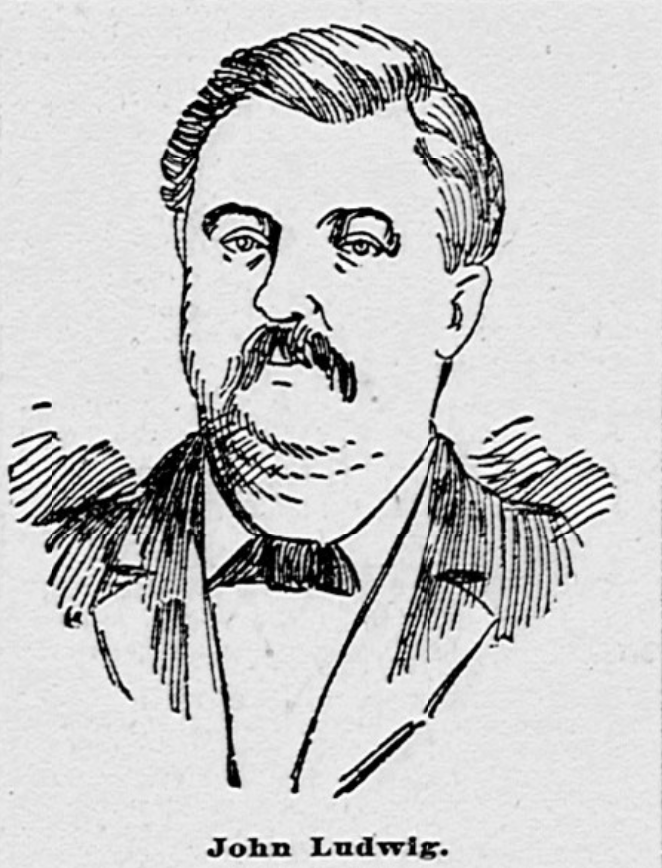
Nominee	David Marston Clough	Edwin E. Lommen	John Ludwig
Party	Republican	Populist	Democratic
Popular vote	148,914	66,026	65,025
Percentage	51.47%	22.82%	22.48%
Lieutenant Governor before election
David Marston Clough
Republican
Elected Lieutenant Governor
David Marston Clough
Republican

The 1894 Minnesota lieutenant gubernatorial election was held on November 6, 1894, to elect the lieutenant governor of Minnesota. Republican nominee and incumbent lieutenant governor David Marston Clough defeated People's nominee Edwin E. Lommen, Democratic nominee John Ludwig and Prohibition nominee Charles M. Way.

== General election ==
On election day, November 6, 1894, Republican nominee David Marston Clough won re-election by a margin of 82,888 votes against his foremost opponent, People's nominee Edwin E. Lommen, thereby retaining Republican control over the office of lieutenant governor. Clough was sworn in for his second term on January 3, 1895.

=== Results ===
Minnesota lieutenant gubernatorial election, 1894
Party	Candidate	Votes	%
Republican	David Marston Clough (incumbent)	148,914	51.47
Populist	Edwin E. Lommen	66,026	22.82
Democratic	John Ludwig	65,025	22.48
Prohibition	Charles M. Way	9,347	3.23
Total votes		289,312	100.00
Republican hold			
