= 1867 Minnesota lieutenant gubernatorial election =

- November 5, 1867
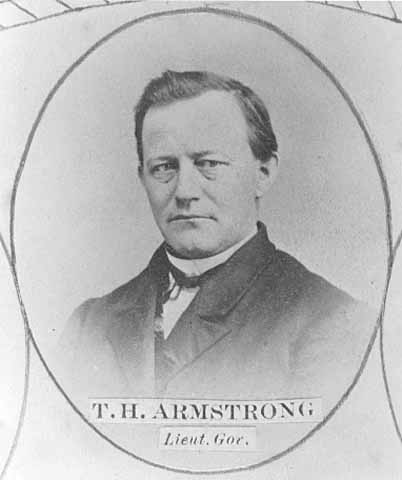

Nominee	Thomas H. Armstrong	Arba Maynard
Party	Republican	Democratic
Popular vote	35,056	29,283
Percentage	54.48%	45.51%
Lieutenant Governor before election
Thomas H. Armstrong
Republican
Elected Lieutenant Governor
Thomas H. Armstrong
Republican

The 1867 Minnesota lieutenant gubernatorial election was held on November 5, 1867, to elect the lieutenant governor of Minnesota. Republican nominee and incumbent lieutenant governor Thomas H. Armstrong defeated Democratic nominee Arba Maynard.

== General election ==
On election day, November 5, 1867, Republican nominee Thomas H. Armstrong won re-election by a margin of 5,773 votes against his opponent, Democratic nominee Arba Maynard, thereby retaining Republican control over the office of lieutenant governor. Armstrong was sworn in for his second term on January 8, 1868.

=== Candidates ===
- Thomas H. Armstrong, incumbent (Republican)
- Arba Maynard, member of the Minnesota House of Representatives (Democratic)

=== Results ===
Minnesota lieutenant gubernatorial election, 1867
Party	Candidate	Votes	%
Republican	Thomas H. Armstrong (incumbent)	35,056	54.48
Democratic	Arba Maynard	29,283	45.51
	Scattering	8	0.01
Total votes		64,347	100.00
Republican hold			
