= Thomas Cowan (Minnesota politician) =

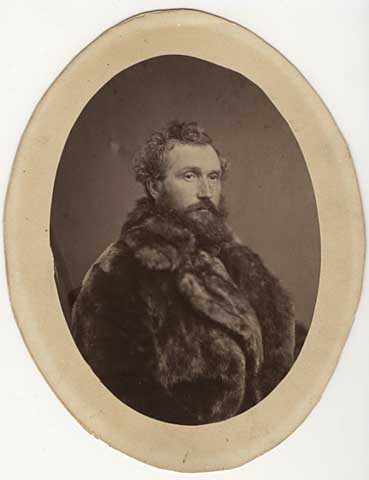
- Cowan c. 1860

Member of the Minnesota Senate from the 17th district
- In office December 2, 1857 – January 7, 1861

Personal details
- Born: 1821 Fife, Scotland
- Died: August 1, 1863 (aged 41–42) Traverse des Sioux
- Party: Democratic

Thomas Cowan (1821 – August 1, 1863) was a politician from the U.S. state of Minnesota.

Cowan was born in Scotland and immigrated to Minnesota in 1854, and would begin work as an attorney. He elected to the Minnesota Senate and served there from 1857 to 1861. In 1861, he ran for lieutenant governor of Minnesota. He was defeated by Republican incumbent Ignatius Donnelly. Like other Democratic candidates that year, such as gubernatorial nominee Edward O. Hamlin, Cowan had his loyalty to the Union questioned due to the ongoing American Civil War.

He died at Traverse des Sioux in 1863.

Cowan was an opponent of a law banning the sale of alcohol to Native Americans off of reservations.
