= 1865 Minnesota lieutenant gubernatorial election =

- November 7, 1865
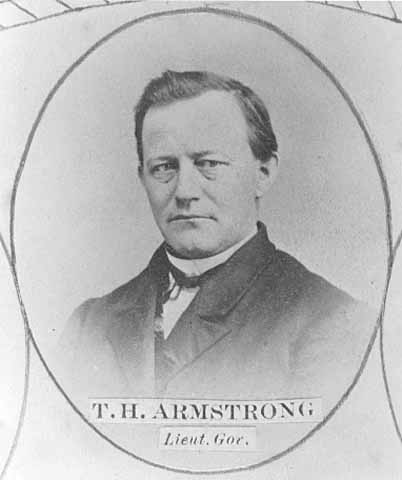

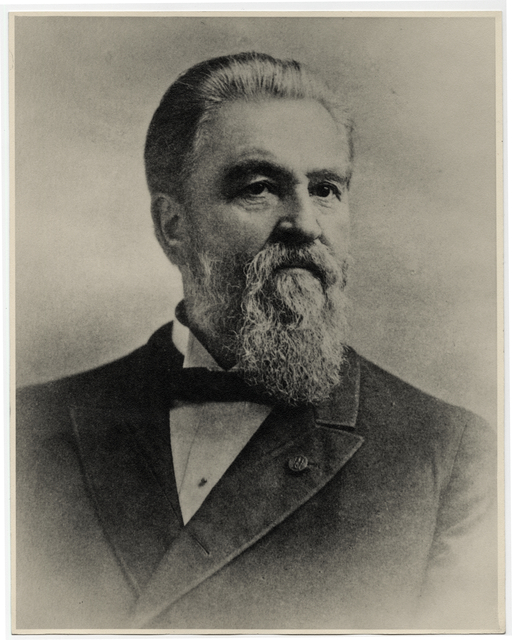
Nominee	Thomas H. Armstrong	Charles W. Nash
Party	Republican	Democratic
Popular vote	17,502	13,677
Percentage	56.13%	43.87%
Lieutenant Governor before election
Charles D. Sherwood
Republican
Elected Lieutenant Governor
Thomas H. Armstrong
Republican

The 1865 Minnesota lieutenant gubernatorial election was held on November 7, 1865, to elect the lieutenant governor of Minnesota. Republican nominee and former Speaker of the Minnesota House of Representatives Thomas H. Armstrong defeated Democratic nominee Charles W. Nash.

== General election ==
On election day, November 7, 1865, Republican nominee Thomas H. Armstrong won the election by a margin of 3,825 votes against his opponent, Democratic nominee Charles W. Nash, thereby retaining Republican control over the office of lieutenant governor. Armstrong was sworn in as the 5th lieutenant governor of Minnesota on January 8, 1866.

=== Candidates ===
- Thomas H. Armstrong, speaker of the Minnesota House (Republican)
- Charles Whippo Nash, attorney

=== Results ===
Minnesota lieutenant gubernatorial election, 1865
Party	Candidate	Votes	%
Republican	Thomas H. Armstrong	17,502	56.13
Democratic	Charles W. Nash	13,677	43.87
Total votes		31,179	100.00
Republican hold			
