= 1888 Minnesota lieutenant gubernatorial election =

- November 6, 1888
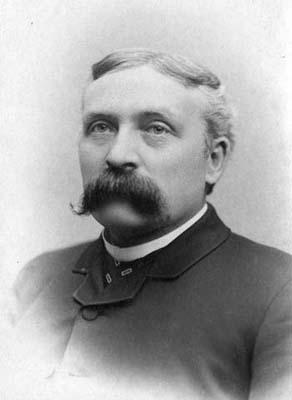

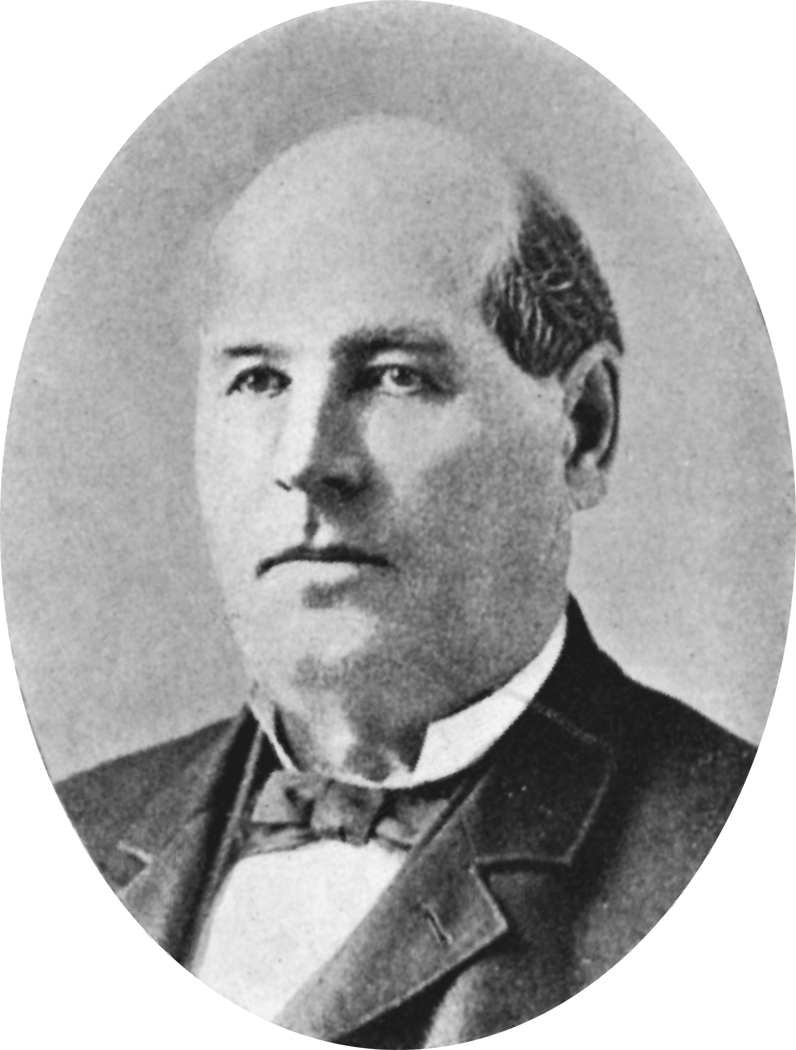

Nominee	Albert E. Rice	Daniel Buck	Theodore S. Reimstad
Party	Republican	Democratic	Prohibition
Popular vote	139,774	104,708	15,565
Percentage	53.65%	40.19%	5.97%
Lieutenant Governor before election
Albert E. Rice
Republican
Elected Lieutenant Governor
Albert E. Rice
Republican

The 1888 Minnesota lieutenant gubernatorial election was held on November 6, 1888, to elect the lieutenant governor of Minnesota. Republican nominee and incumbent lieutenant governor Albert E. Rice defeated Democratic nominee and former member of the Minnesota Senate Daniel Buck, Prohibition nominee Theodore S. Reimstad and Union Labor nominee Milan N. Pond.

== General election ==
On election day, November 6, 1888, Republican nominee Albert E. Rice won re-election by a margin of 35,066 votes against his foremost opponent, Democratic nominee Daniel Buck, thereby retaining Republican control over the office of lieutenant governor. Rice was sworn in for his second term on January 9, 1889.

=== Results ===
Minnesota lieutenant gubernatorial election, 1888
Party	Candidate	Votes	%
Republican	Albert E. Rice (incumbent)	139,774	53.65
Democratic	Daniel Buck	104,708	40.19
Prohibition	Theodore S. Reimstad	15,565	5.97
Union Labor	Milan N. Pond	497	0.19
Total votes		260,544	100.00
Republican hold			
