= George B. Kingsley =

George Bradford Kingsley
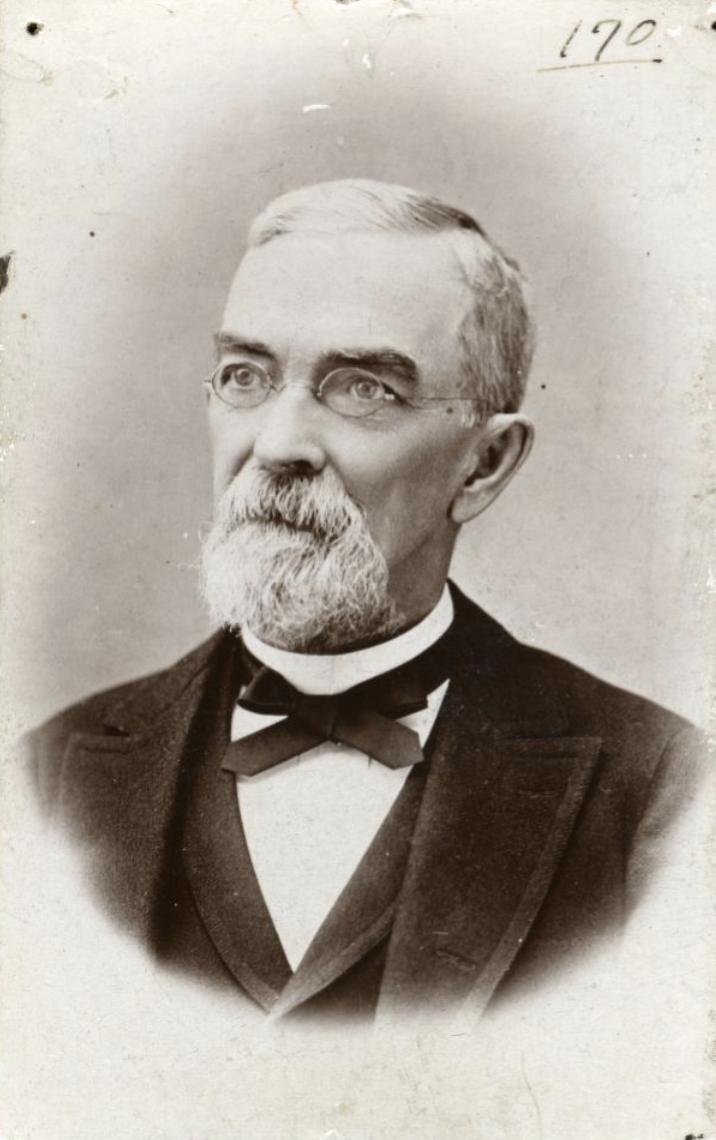
- Undated portrait of Kingsley

Member of the Minnesota House of Representatives from the 14th district
- In office January 12, 1858 – December 6, 1859

Personal details
- Born: March 21, 1832 Deposit, New York
- Died: January 8, 1894 (aged 61) Blue Earth, Minnesota
- Party: Prohibition; Democratic

George B. Kingsley (March 21, 1832 – January 8, 1894) was a U.S. politician from the state of Minnesota.

Kingsley was born in Deposit, New York in 1832, and moved to Blue Earth, Minnesota in 1854. He then became an attorney. Originally a Democrat, he began his time in the Minnesota House of Representatives in 1858. In 1881, he ran for lieutenant governor for the Prohibition Party.
