= Loren Fletcher =

American politician

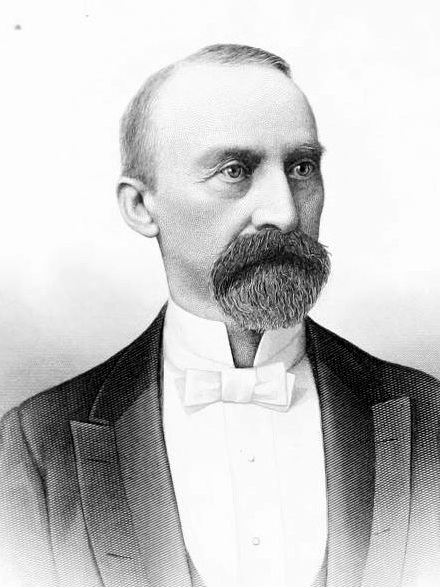

Member of the U.S. House of Representatives from Minnesota's 5th district
- In office March 4, 1893 – March 3, 1903
- Preceded by: Kittel Halvorson
- Succeeded by: John Lind
- In office March 4, 1905 – March 3, 1907
- Preceded by: John Lind
- Succeeded by: Frank Nye

16th Speaker of the Minnesota House of Representatives
- In office 1881–1885
- Preceded by: Charles A. Gilman
- Succeeded by: John L. Gibbs

Member of the Minnesota House of Representatives
- In office 1872–1886

Personal details
- Born: April 10, 1833 Mount Vernon, Maine, U.S.
- Died: April 15, 1919 (aged 86) Atlanta, Georgia, U.S.
- Resting place: Lakewood Cemetery
- Party: Republican
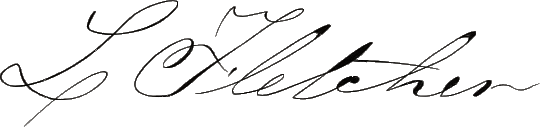
- Signature

Loren Fletcher (April 10, 1833 – April 15, 1919) was a U.S. representative from Minnesota.

== Biography ==
He was born in Mount Vernon, Kennebec County, Maine and attended the public schools and Maine Wesleyan Seminary, Kents Hill, Maine. Fletcher moved to Bangor in 1853, where he was a stonecutter, clerk in a store, and an employee of a lumber company.

In 1856, he moved to Minneapolis, Minnesota, and engaged in manufacturing and mercantile pursuits, largely in the manufacture of lumber and flour. He became a member of the board of directors of the First National Bank upon its establishment in 1864.

In 1873, Fletcher was involved in the abduction of Lord Gordon Gordon at the behest of Jay Gould from Canada. He was arrested together with Gould, John Gilfillan and Eugene McLanahan Wilson. They were released on bail after diplomatic pressure by Minnesota Governor Horace Austin.

Fletcher was elected a member of the Minnesota House of Representatives 1872 – 1886, and served as speaker from 1880 to 1885. Beginning with the 1892 election, he was elected as a Republican to the 53rd, 54th, 55th, 56th, and 57th congresses (March 4, 1893 – March 3, 1903). Fletcher served as chairman of the Committee on Expenditures on Public Buildings (57th congress. He was defeated in the 1902 election to the 58th congress, but was elected to the 59th congress, (March 4, 1905 – March 3, 1907). He declined to be a candidate for reelection and retired from active business.

Fletcher died in Atlanta, Georgia, April 15, 1919, aged 86; he is interred in Lakewood Cemetery, Minneapolis, Minnesota.

Fletcher was married to Amerette J. Thomas from 1855 until she died in 1892. The couple had one child, a daughter.

== Sources ==
- Loren Fletcher Memorial. Minnesota Journal of the House, April 22, 1919, p. 1857.
- Shutter, Marion Daniel. "Loren Fletcher." Progressive Men of Minnesota, Minneapolis: The Minneapolis Journal, 1897, p. 38-39.
- "Fletcher, L." The Fifteenth Legislature of Minnesota. St. Paul: Press Printing Company, 1873, p. 27.
- "Hon. L. Fletcher." Memoirs of the State Officers; and of the Nineteenth Legislature of Minnesota, by C.L. Hall. Minneapolis: Johnson & Smith, p. 36.

U.S. House of Representatives
| Preceded by Kittel Halvorson | U.S. Representative from Minnesota's 5th congressional district 1893–1903 | Succeeded by John Lind |
| Preceded by John Lind | U.S. Representative from Minnesota's 5th congressional district 1905–1907 | Succeeded by Frank Nye |
Political offices
| Preceded by Charles A. Gilman | Speaker of the Minnesota House of Representatives; 1881–1885 | Succeeded by John L. Gibbs |
