= 1861 Minnesota lieutenant gubernatorial election =

- November 5, 1861
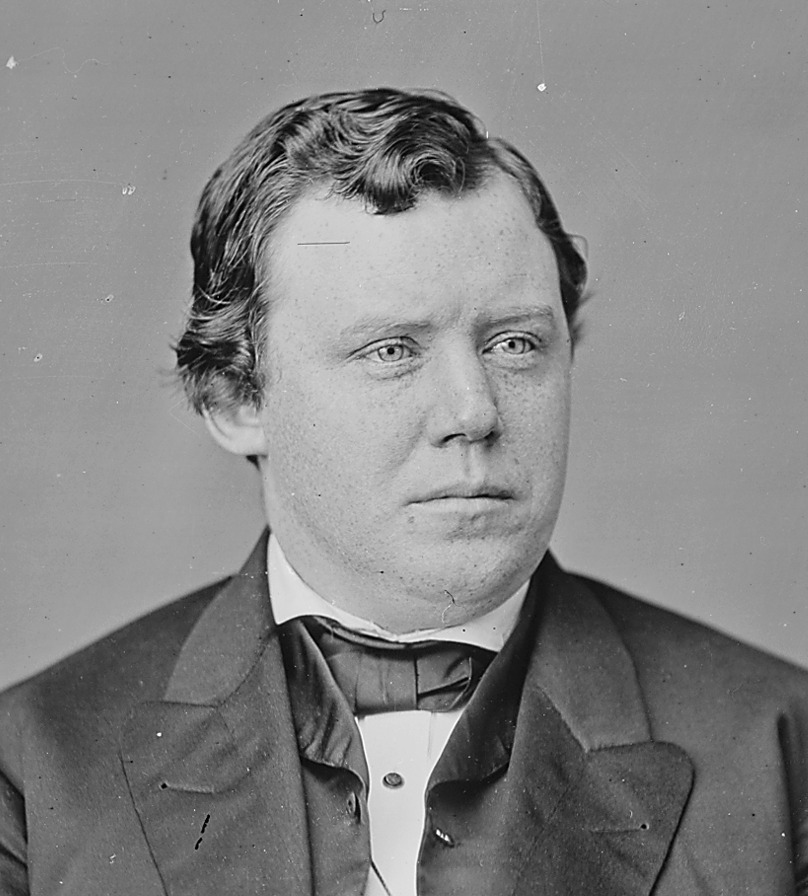

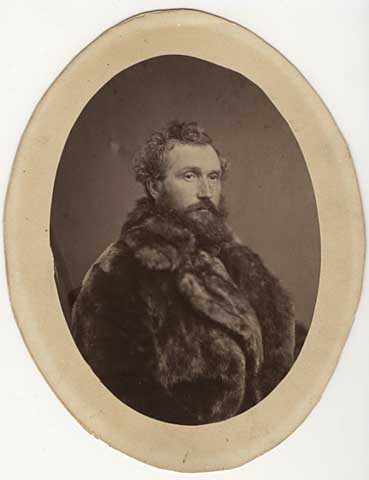
Nominee	Ignatius L. Donnelly	Thomas Cowan
Party	Republican	Democratic
Popular vote	16,089	10,500
Percentage	60.45%	39.45%
Lieutenant Governor before election
Ignatius L. Donnelly
Republican
Elected Lieutenant Governor
Ignatius L. Donnelly
Republican

The 1861 Minnesota lieutenant gubernatorial election was held on November 5, 1861, to elect the lieutenant governor of Minnesota. Republican nominee and incumbent lieutenant governor Ignatius L. Donnelly defeated Democratic nominee Thomas Cowan.

== General election ==
On election day, November 5, 1861, Republican nominee Ignatius L. Donnelly won re-election by a margin of 5,589 votes against his opponent, Democratic nominee Thomas Cowan, thereby retaining Republican control over the office of lieutenant governor. Donnelly was sworn in for his second term on January 2, 1862.

=== Candidates ===
- Thomas Cowan, attorney (Democrat)
- Ignatius Donnelly, incumbent (Republican)

=== Results ===
Minnesota lieutenant gubernatorial election, 1861
Party	Candidate	Votes	%
Republican	Ignatius L. Donnelly (incumbent)	16,089	60.45
Democratic	Thomas Cowan	10,500	39.45
	Scattering	21	0.08
	Christopher Columbus Andrews (write-in)	4	0.02
	N. V. Bennett	1	0.00
Total votes		26,615	100.00
Republican hold			
