= Frank A. Day =

American politician (1855–1928)

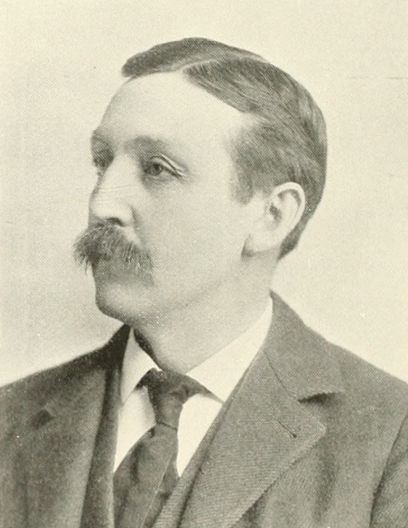

13th Lieutenant Governor of Minnesota
- In office January 31, 1895 – January 5, 1897
- Governor: David Marston Clough
- Preceded by: David Marston Clough
- Succeeded by: John L. Gibbs

Member of the Minnesota Senate from the 9th district
- In office January 4, 1927 – December 27, 1928
- Preceded by: John M. Gemmill
- Succeeded by: Henry August Saggau

Member of the Minnesota House of Representatives
- In office 1878

Personal details
- Born: September 30, 1855 Attica, Wisconsin
- Died: December 27, 1928 (aged 73) Winona, Minnesota
- Party: Republican
- Spouse(s): Lucia Howland, Helen Mills
- Profession: newspaper man, legislator

Frank Arah Day (September 30, 1855 – December 27, 1928) was a Minnesota legislator and the 13th lieutenant governor of Minnesota.

== Life and career ==
Day was born in Attica, Wisconsin. He moved to Minnesota in 1874, settling in Fairmont, Minnesota. He was founder and publisher of the Martin County (later Fairmont) Sentinel newspaper, and later became involved in local Republican politics. He also served in both houses of the Minnesota State Legislature: he was elected to the Minnesota State House of Representatives in 1878 (the youngest serving member at the time) and to the Minnesota State Senate from 1886 to 1895. He became Lieutenant Governor under Governor from January 31, 1895 to January 5, 1897 after Knute Nelson was elected to the U.S. Senate and his lieutenant governor David Marston Clough replaced him. In the 1890s he became involved with the Silver Republican Party.

Day was re-elected to the Minnesota State Senate in 1926 as an independent. He died following a paralytic stroke while in office in 1928 in Winona, Minnesota. He is buried in Fairmont, Minnesota.

Political offices
| Preceded by David Marston Clough | Lieutenant Governor of Minnesota; January 31, 1895 – January 5, 1897 | Succeeded by John L. Gibbs |
