= Kittel Halvorson =

American politician

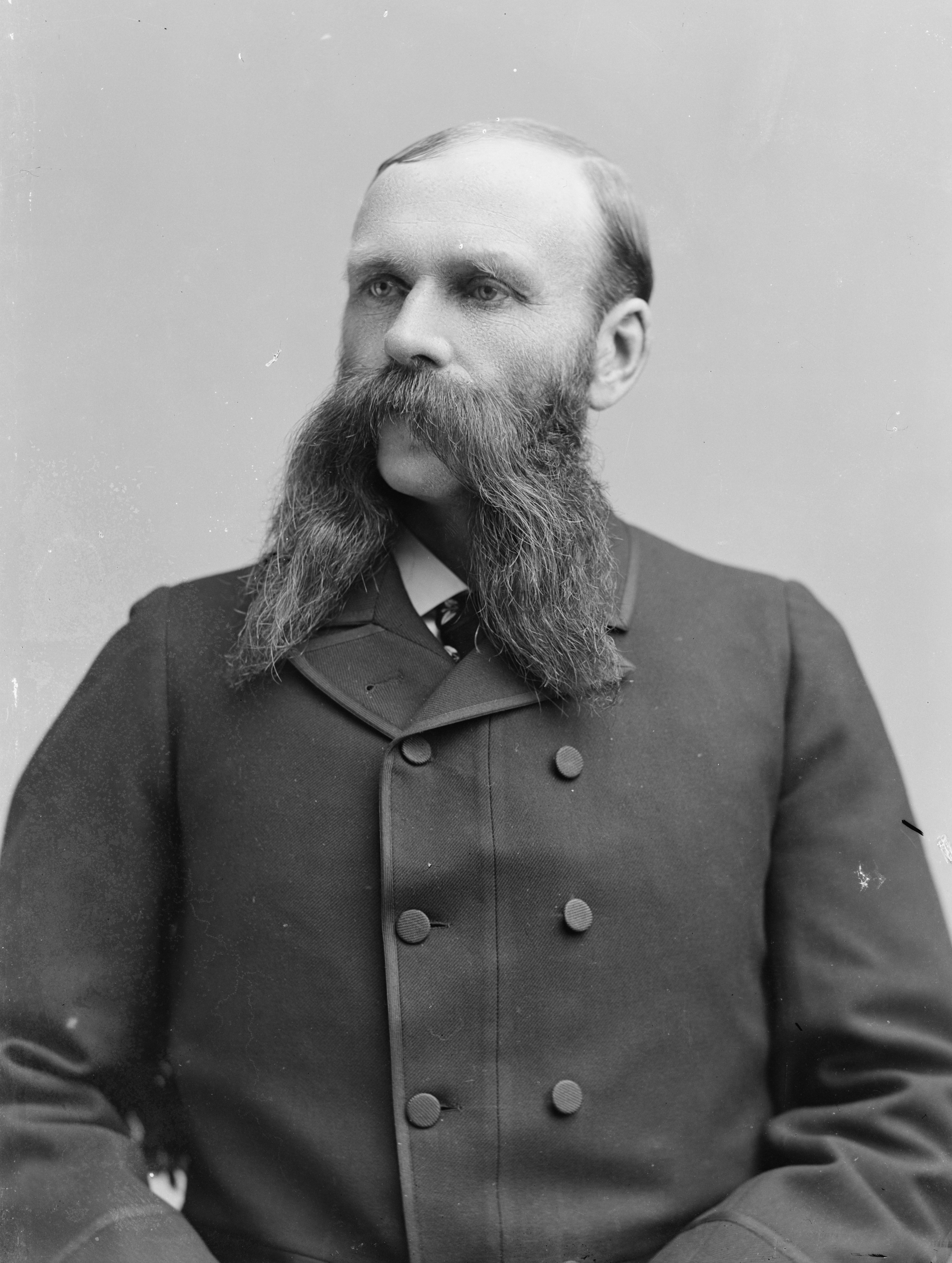
- Portrait by C. M. Bell c. 1891–1893

Member of the U.S. House of Representatives from Minnesota's 5th district
- In office March 4, 1891 – March 3, 1893
- Preceded by: Solomon Comstock
- Succeeded by: Loren Fletcher

Personal details
- Born: December 15, 1846 Tuddal, Hjartdal, Telemark, Norway
- Died: July 12, 1936 (aged 89) Havana, North Dakota, U.S.
- Party: Populist
- Other political affiliations: Socialist (1906)

Kittel Halvorson (December 15, 1846 – July 12, 1936) was a was a Norwegian-born American U.S. representative from state of Minnesota.

== Biography ==
Kittil Halvorsen was born on December 15, 1847 at the Kjelldalen farm in Tuddal parish, Hjartdal Municipality, Telemark, Norway, according to local baptismal records. In 1848, he immigrated to the United States with his parents, who settled near Whitewater, Walworth County, Wisconsin. They subsequently moved to Columbia County and then to Winnebago County. He attended the public schools in Winchester, Wisconsin. In 1863, Halvorson enlisted in Company C, First Regiment, Wisconsin Heavy Artillery, and served until the close of the Civil War. His service record included participation in the Battle of Missionary Ridge and the Battle of Chattanooga.

Halvorson moved to Minnesota in November 1865 and homesteaded near Belgrade, Stearns County where he engaged in agricultural pursuits and stock raising. He served as justice of the peace 1870 – 1875; chairman of the board of supervisors 1870–1880; township assessor in 1880; town clerk 1880 – 1891 and member of the Minnesota House of Representatives 1886–1888. He was elected as a Populist to the 52nd United States Congress, (March 4, 1891 – March 3, 1893). He was an unsuccessful candidate for reelection in 1892 to the 53rd Congress. He resumed agricultural pursuits near Brooten, Stearns County, Minnesota. He served as an alternate delegate to the Populist Party National Convention in 1896. He moved to Tewaukon Township, Sargent County, North Dakota in 1900 and engaged in agricultural pursuits. He was an unsuccessful candidate for representative from North Dakota for the Socialist Party of America in 1906. He returned to Minnesota in 1910 and resuming farming in North Fork until 1924, when he retired.

Halvorson died in Havana, North Dakota, on July 12, 1936.

== Note ==
- United States Congress. "Kittel Halvorson (id: H000094)". Biographical Directory of the United States Congress.

U.S. House of Representatives
Preceded by Solomon Comstock	U.S. Representative from Minnesota's 5th congressional district 1891 – 1893	Succeeded by Loren Fletcher
