= Senator Durand =

Senator Durand may refer to:

- Frank Durand (1895–1978), New Jersey State Senate
- Robert Durand (born 1953), Massachusetts State Senate

== See also ==
- Senator Durant (disambiguation)
