= Edward W. Durant =

American politician (1829–1918)

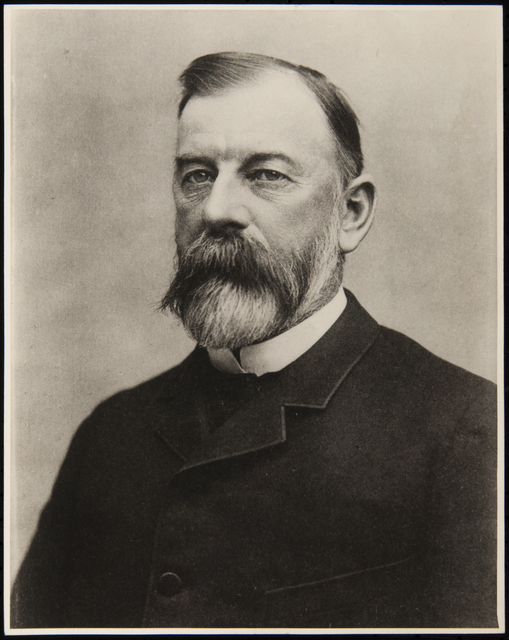
- Durant in 1878

Member of the Minnesota Senate from the 31st district
- In office January 5, 1903 – January 6, 1907

Member of the Minnesota Senate from the 24th district
- In office January 3, 1887 – January 4, 1891

Member of the Minnesota House of Representatives from the 24th district
- In office January 6, 1885 – January 3, 1887

Member of the Minnesota House of Representatives from the 22nd district
- In office January 7, 1873 – January 3, 1876

Personal details
- Born: April 8, 1829 Roxbury, Massachusetts
- Died: December 9, 1918 (aged 89)
- Party: Democratic

Edward W. Durant (Note: sometimes spelled 'Durand') (April 8, 1829 – December 9, 1918) was a U.S. politician from the state of Minnesota.

== Life ==
Durant was born in Roxbury, Massachusetts (now part of Boston) in 1829. His family moved to Cincinnati, Ohio in ~1831, and then to Illinois in 1839. He moved to Stillwater, Minnesota in April 1848, 1849, or 1858. He worked there as a steamboat pilot. In 1861, he become mayor of Stillwater after previously serving on the city council. He was a Grand Master in the Masonic Fraternity and a Grand Chancellor in the Knights of Pythias.

In 1875, he unsuccessfully ran for lieutenant governor. He was elected to both chambers of the Minnesota legislature, serving in the House for three terms, and the Senate for four terms.
