= Lieutenant Governor of Minnesota =

Elected political office in Minnesota, United States

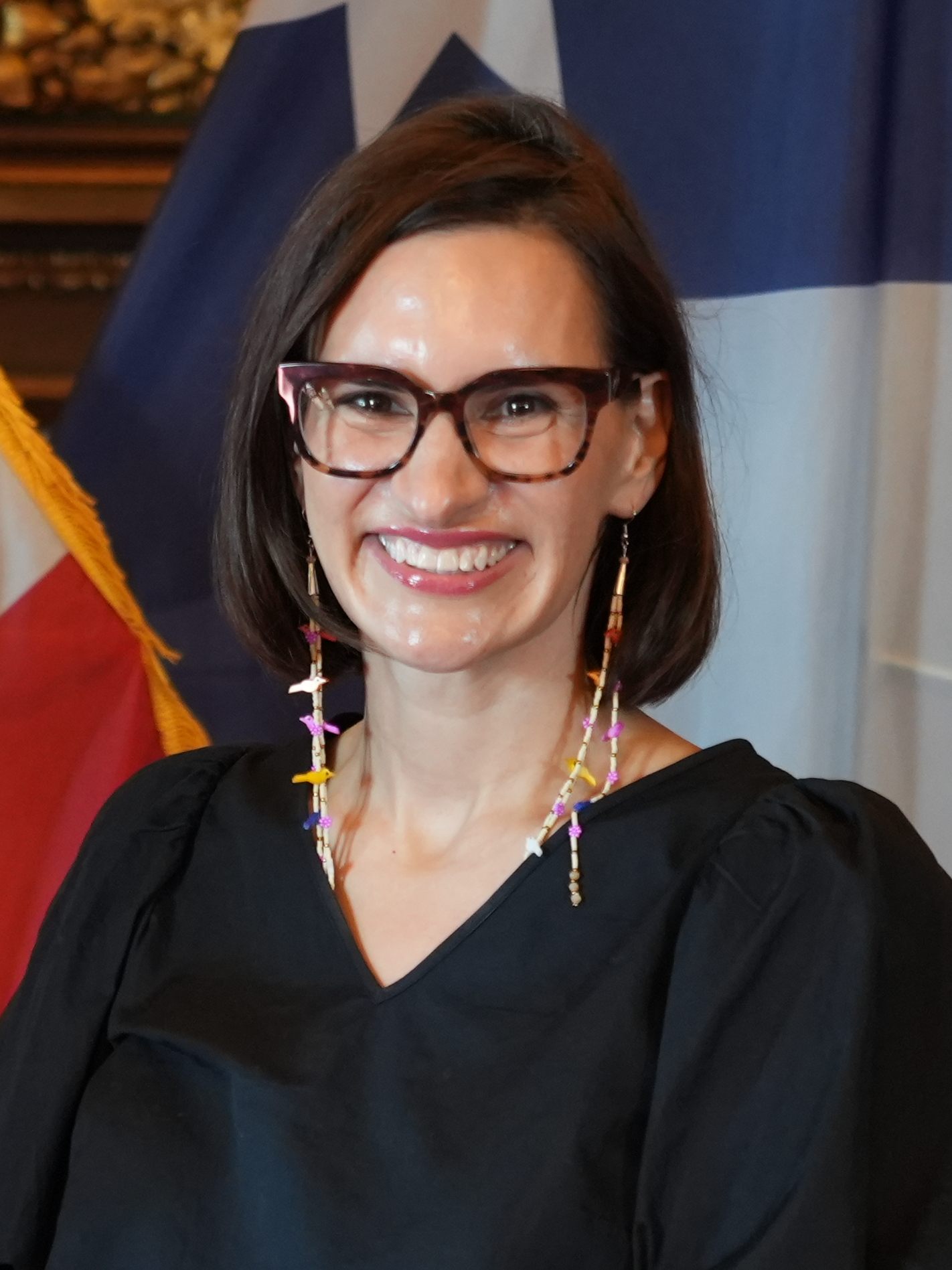
- Incumbent; Peggy Flanagan since January 7, 2019
- Style: Mister or Madam Lieutenant Governor (informal); The Honorable (formal)
- Seat: Minnesota State Capitol; Saint Paul, Minnesota
- Appointer: General election
- Term length: Four years, no term limits
- Constituting instrument: Minnesota Constitution of 1858, Article V
- Inaugural holder: William Holcombe
- Formation: May 11, 1858 (168 years ago)
- Succession: First
- Salary: $105,038
- Website: Official page

The lieutenant governor of Minnesota is a constitutional officer in the executive branch of the U.S. state of Minnesota. Fifty individuals have held the office of lieutenant governor since statehood. The incumbent is Peggy Flanagan, a DFLer and the first Native American elected to a statewide executive office in Minnesota's history.

== Powers and duties ==
The lieutenant governor assists the governor in carrying out the functions of the executive branch, as well as serving in the governor's place in the event of his or her absence or disability. The governor, as prescribed by law, may file a written order with the secretary of state to delegate to the lieutenant governor any powers, duties, responsibilities, or functions otherwise performed by the governor. As a key member of the governor's cabinet, the lieutenant governor is consulted on all major policy and budgetary decisions. Moreover, the lieutenant governor is a statutory member of the Executive Council and chairs the Advisory Committee on Capitol Area Security, the Capitol Area Architectural Planning Board, and the State Capitol Preservation Commission.

== History ==
In 1886, elections were moved from odd-numbered years to even-numbered years. Beginning with the 1962 election, the term of the lieutenant governor increased from two to four years. Prior to the 1974 election, governors and lieutenant governors were elected on separate ballots, with the lieutenant governor having independent legislative authority as president of the senate. Since 1974, the lieutenant governor has been relieved of the duty to preside over the state senate and is elected on a joint ticket with the governor. Marlene Johnson, elected in 1982 as the running mate of Rudy Perpich, was the first female lieutenant governor of Minnesota. All nine of her successors in that office have also been women.

== List ==
Parties

Democratic Democratic–Farmer–Labor Farmer–Labor Republican/Independent Republican Reform/Independence

No.	Image	Lieutenant Governor	Term	Party	Election	Governor
1		William Holcombe	May 24, 1858 – January 2, 1860	Democratic	1857	Henry Sibley
2		Ignatius Donnelly	January 2, 1860 – March 4, 1863	Republican	1859; 1861	Alexander Ramsey
3		Henry Adoniram Swift	March 4, 1863 – July 10, 1863	Republican		Alexander Ramsey
Office vacant from July 10, 1863 – January 11, 1864
4		Charles D. Sherwood	January 11, 1864 – January 8, 1866	Republican	1863	Stephen Miller
5		Thomas H. Armstrong	January 8, 1866 – January 7, 1870	Republican	1865; 1867	William R. Marshall
6		William H. Yale	January 7, 1870 – January 9, 1874	Republican	1869; 1871	Horace Austin
7		Alphonso Barto	January 9, 1874 – January 7, 1876	Republican	1873	Cushman K. Davis
8		James Wakefield	January 7, 1876 – January 10, 1880	Republican	1875; 1877	John S. Pillsbury; Lucius F. Hubbard
9		Charles A. Gilman	January 10, 1880 – January 4, 1887	Republican	1879; 1881; 1883	John S. Pillsbury; Lucius F. Hubbard
10		Albert E. Rice	January 4, 1887 – January 5, 1891	Republican	1886; 1888	Andrew R. McGill; William R. Merriam
11		Gideon S. Ives	January 5, 1891 – January 3, 1893	Republican	1890	William R. Merriam; Knute Nelson
12		David Marston Clough	January 3, 1893 – January 31, 1895	Republican	1892; 1894	Knute Nelson
13		Frank A. Day	January 31, 1895 – January 5, 1897	Republican		David Marston Clough
14		John L. Gibbs	January 5, 1897 – January 3, 1899	Republican	1896	David Marston Clough
15		Lyndon A. Smith	January 3, 1899 – January 5, 1903	Republican	1898; 1900	John Lind; Samuel R. Van Sant
16		Ray W. Jones	January 5, 1903 – January 7, 1907	Republican	1902; 1904	Samuel R. Van Sant; John A. Johnson
17		Adolph Olson Eberhart	January 7, 1907 – September 21, 1909	Republican	1906; 1908	John A. Johnson
18		Edward Everett Smith	September 25, 1909 – January 3, 1911	Republican		Adolph Olson Eberhart
19		Samuel Y. Gordon	January 3, 1911 – January 7, 1913	Republican	1910	Adolph Olson Eberhart
20		Joseph A. A. Burnquist	January 7, 1913 – December 30, 1915	Republican	1912; 1914	Adolph Olson Eberhart; Winfield S. Hammond
Office vacant from December 30, 1915 – October 28, 1916
21		George H. Sullivan	October 28, 1916 – January 2, 1917	Republican		Joseph A. A. Burnquist
22		Thomas Frankson	January 2, 1917 – January 4, 1921	Republican	1916; 1918	Joseph A. A. Burnquist
23		Louis L. Collins	January 4, 1921 – January 6, 1925	Republican	1920; 1922	J. A. O. Preus
24		William I. Nolan	January 6, 1925 – June 25, 1929	Republican	1924; 1926	Theodore Christianson
25		Charles Edward Adams	June 25, 1929 – January 6, 1931	Republican	1928	Theodore Christianson
26		Henry M. Arens	January 6, 1931 – January 3, 1933	Farmer-Labor	1930	Floyd B. Olson
27		Konrad K. Solberg	January 3, 1933 – January 8, 1935	Farmer-Labor	1932	Floyd B. Olson
28		Hjalmar Petersen	January 8, 1935 – August 24, 1936	Farmer-Labor	1934	Floyd B. Olson
--		William B. Richardson^{1}	August 24, 1936 – January 1, 1937	Republican		Hjalmar Petersen
29		Gottfrid Lindsten	January 5, 1937 – January 2, 1939	Farmer-Labor	1936	Elmer Benson
30		C. Elmer Anderson	January 2, 1939 – January 4, 1943	Republican	1938; 1940	Harold Stassen
31		Edward John Thye	January 4, 1943 – April 27, 1943	Republican	1942	Harold Stassen
33		Archie H. Miller	May 6, 1943 – January 2, 1945	Republican		Edward John Thye
33		C. Elmer Anderson	January 2, 1945 – September 27, 1951	Republican	1944; 1946; 1948; 1950	Edward John Thye; Luther Youngdahl
Office vacant from September 27, 1951 – January 5, 1953
34		Ancher Nelsen	January 5, 1953 – May 1, 1953	Republican	1952	C. Elmer Anderson
Office vacant from May 1, 1953 – September 3, 1954
35		Donald O. Wright^{2}	September 3, 1954 – January 3, 1955	Republican		C. Elmer Anderson
36		Karl Rolvaag	January 3, 1955 – January 8, 1963	Democratic-Farmer-Labor (DFL)	1954; 1956; 1958; 1960	Orville Freeman; Elmer L. Andersen
37		Alexander M. Keith	January 8, 1963 – January 2, 1967	DFL	1962	Karl Rolvaag
38		James B. Goetz	January 2, 1967 – January 4, 1971	Republican	1966	Harold LeVander
39		Rudy Perpich	January 4, 1971 – December 29, 1976	DFL	1970; 1974	Wendell Anderson
40		Alec G. Olson^{3}	December 29, 1976 – January 4, 1979	DFL		Rudy Perpich
41		Lou Wangberg	January 4, 1979 – January 3, 1983	Independent-Republican	1978	Al Quie
42		Marlene Johnson	January 3, 1983 – January 7, 1991	DFL	1982; 1986	Rudy Perpich
43		Joanell Dyrstad	January 7, 1991 – January 3, 1995	Independent-Republican	1990	Arne Carlson
44		Joanne Benson	January 3, 1995 – January 4, 1999	Republican	1994	Arne Carlson
45		Mae Schunk	January 4, 1999 – January 6, 2003	Reform/Independence	1998	Jesse Ventura
46		Carol Molnau	January 6, 2003 – January 3, 2011	Republican	2002; 2006	Tim Pawlenty
47		Yvonne Prettner Solon	January 3, 2011 – January 5, 2015	DFL	2010	Mark Dayton
48		Tina Smith	January 5, 2015 – January 2, 2018	DFL	2014	Mark Dayton
49		Michelle Fischbach^{4}	January 2, 2018 – January 7, 2019	Republican		Mark Dayton
50		Peggy Flanagan	January 7, 2019 – Incumbent	DFL	2018; 2022	Tim Walz
51		Ben Schierer	Elect, takes office January 4 2027	DFL	2026	Amy Klobuchar

1 Richardson was actually president pro tem of the Minnesota Senate; became acting lieutenant governor when lieutenant governor Hjalmar Petersen became governor on the death of Floyd B. Olson, but Richardson was never sworn in.

2 Wright was president pro tem of the Minnesota Senate and assumed the office of lieutenant governor in 1954 after Lieutenant Governor Ancher Nelsen resigned to become administrator of the Rural Electric Administration.

3 As president of the Minnesota Senate, Olson assumed office of lieutenant governor when Rudy Perpich, then lieutenant governor, became governor on the resignation of Wendell Anderson; Anderson arranged with Perpich to be appointed to the United States Senate after the resignation of Walter Mondale, who had been elected vice president.

4 As president of the Minnesota Senate, Fischbach became lieutenant governor following the resignation of Tina Smith. Smith was appointed by Governor Mark Dayton to fill the United States Senate seat vacated by Al Franken. Fischbach resigned from the state Senate and took the oath of office for lieutenant governor on May 25, 2018.

== Note on Minnesota political parties names ==
- Minnesota Democratic–Farmer–Labor Party: On April 15, 1944, the Minnesota Democratic Party and the Minnesota Farmer–Labor Party merged and created the Minnesota Democratic–Farmer–Labor Party (DFL). It is affiliated with the national Democratic Party.
- Republican Party of Minnesota: From November 15, 1975, to September 23, 1995, the name of the state Republican party was the Independent Republican party (IR). The party has always been affiliated with the national Republican Party.
- Independence Party of Minnesota: The party was founded under this name in 1992. In 1995 the IPM affiliated with the national Reform Party and renamed itself the Reform Party of Minnesota. In 2000 the Reform Party of Minnesota disaffiliated with the national Reform party and returned to the name Independence party.

== See also ==
- Governor of Minnesota
- List of governors of Minnesota
