= Alphonso Barto =

American politician (1834–1899)

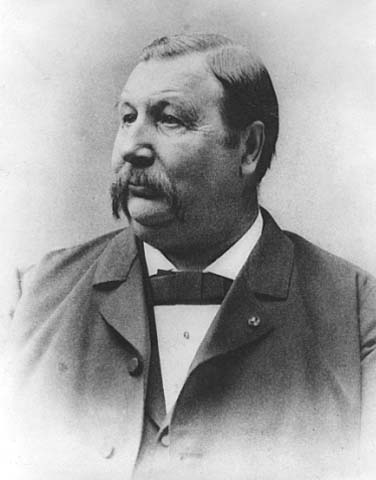
- Barto in 1891

Member of the Minnesota House of Representatives from the 31st district
- In office January 2, 1872 – January 5, 1874

7th Lieutenant Governor of Minnesota
- In office January 9, 1874 – January 7, 1876
- Governor: Cushman K. Davis
- Preceded by: William H. Yale
- Succeeded by: James Wakefield

Personal details
- Born: May 24, 1834 Hinesburg, Vermont
- Died: November 4, 1899 (aged 65) Saint Cloud, Minnesota
- Party: Republican
- Spouse(s): Harriet E. Hitchcock (1854), Charlotte "Lottie" A. Allen (1866)
- Profession: lawyer, legislator

Alphonso Barto (May 24, 1834 – November 4, 1899) was a Minnesota legislator and the seventh lieutenant governor of Minnesota.

== Life and career ==
Barto was born in Hinesburg, Vermont, in 1834. His father William Barto was from a French family which had emigrated to the United States before the American Revolution (their surname was originally spelled "Barteau"). His mother Mary Barto (née Gage) was a descendant of English settlers. Barto moved to Ferrisburgh, Vermont, to attend school. In 1854 he married Harriet E. Hitchcock. Shortly thereafter the two moved west, settling in Elgin, Illinois, where he ran a farm and later read law.

During the American Civil War Barto enlisted in the 52nd Illinois Volunteer Infantry Regiment, serving for three years and mustering out with the rank of captain in October 1865. His first wife Harriet died shortly before Barto returned from his service. Barto resumed his life in Elgin, winning election as treasurer of Kane County, Illinois, for one term and remarrying in 1866 to Charlotte "Lottie" A. Allen.

In 1869 Barto moved to Sauk Centre, Minnesota, to pursue his law career. In 1871 he was elected to the Minnesota House of Representatives, serving a term of two years. In 1873 he won election as lieutenant governor under Cushman K. Davis. While he did not hold a state office again, Barto served in various local offices in and near Saint Cloud, Minnesota, and was appointed as a regent of the University of Minnesota by Governor David Marston Clough. He also remained active with the Republican Party as an organizer and delegate to the 1884 Republican National Convention. Barto died on November 4, 1899, in Saint Cloud, Minnesota.

Political offices
Preceded by William H. Yale	Lieutenant Governor of Minnesota; 1874 – 1876	Succeeded by James Wakefield
