= William Holcombe =

American politician (1804–1870)

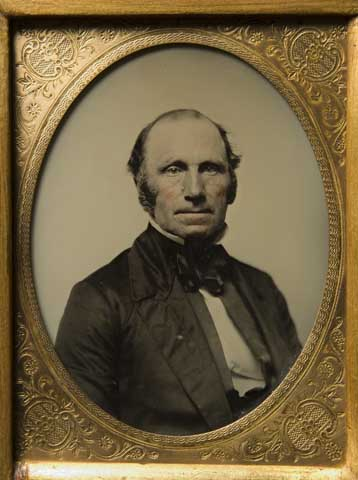
- William Holcombe, 1858

1st Lieutenant Governor of Minnesota
- In office May 24, 1858 – January 2, 1860
- Governor: Henry Hastings Sibley
- Preceded by: Position established
- Succeeded by: Ignatius L. Donnelly

Personal details
- Born: July 22, 1804 Lambertville, New Jersey, U.S.
- Died: September 5, 1870 (aged 66) Stillwater, Minnesota, U.S.
- Party: Democratic
- Spouse(s): Martha Wilson (1826), Henrietta King Clendenin (1847)
- Profession: carriage maker, steamboat captain, public official

William Holcombe (July 22, 1804 – September 5, 1870) was a United States Democratic politician and the first lieutenant governor of Minnesota. He was born in Lambertville, New Jersey and died in Stillwater, Minnesota; Holcombe was mayor of Stillwater, when he died.

== Biography ==
Born in New Jersey, Holcombe moved to Utica, New York in 1822 where he learned the wheelwright trade. There, he married Martha Wilson. Together, the couple moved to Ohio. In 1835, Holcombe became the captain of the steamboat Olive Branch which travelled between St. Louis, Missouri and Galena, Illinois. After the death of his wife, he moved to Galena, and soon after to the St. Croix Valley in 1839, working for the St. Croix Falls Lumber company.

In the fall of 1846, Holcomb moved to Stillwater. He was elected to serve at the Wisconsin Constitutional Convention in 1846, representing the St. Croix Valley and the land north of Crawford County. At the convention, his goal was "obtaining such a boundary as would place the St. Croix Valley without the limits of Wisconsin." In 1847, he appeared as a witness in the trial of "No Tin" for the murder of Henry Rust.

In 1848, Holcombe served as the secretary for the Stillwater Convention which petitioned Congress to form a new Minnesota territory. He helped to establish the First and Second Presbyterian Churches in Stillwater. He served as the receiver of the U.S land office in Stillwater from 1849 to 1853 and became the president of the Minnesota Bible Society and the State Sunday School Association. He also helped to plat and develop the Holcombe neighborhood of Stillwater, including donating his own land for Washington Square Park and developing and selling a number of houses.

After Minnesota became a state, Holcombe ran as the Lt. Governor Candidate with Henry Sibley. They were elected and Holcombe therefore was the first Lt. Governor and a member of the first Minnesota Legislature. His term as Lieutenant Governor did not expire until a few weeks after the 2nd Minnesota State Legislative Session began. Although the Republican Party had a majority in the Minnesota Senate, Holcombe, a Democrat, presided over them until January 2, 1860 when the state officials were sworn in. Some of his rulings so frustrated the Republican majority that they asked the House to impeach him. The House responded that they had no right to interfere with the workings of the Senate and suggested they change their rules. The issue was resolved when Republican Ignatius Donnelly was finally sworn in as Lieutenant Governor.

After serving as Lt. Governor, Holcombe was elected Mayor of Stillwater in 1869 and 1870. He worked on the development of streets and roads. He also served as the Superintendent of Stillwater Schools.

Holcombe died on Monday, September 5, 1870 after discovering a cow loose in his yard. He suffered a heart attack trying to shoo away the cow.

== Legacy ==
There is a Holcombe Street in Stillwater.

Nicole Helget's Civil War-era novel "Stillwater" includes a character based on William Holcombe.

== Notes ==
Political offices
Preceded by None	Lieutenant Governor of Minnesota; 1858 – 1860	Succeeded by Ignatius L. Donnelly
