= Lyndon A. Smith =

American politician (1854–1918)

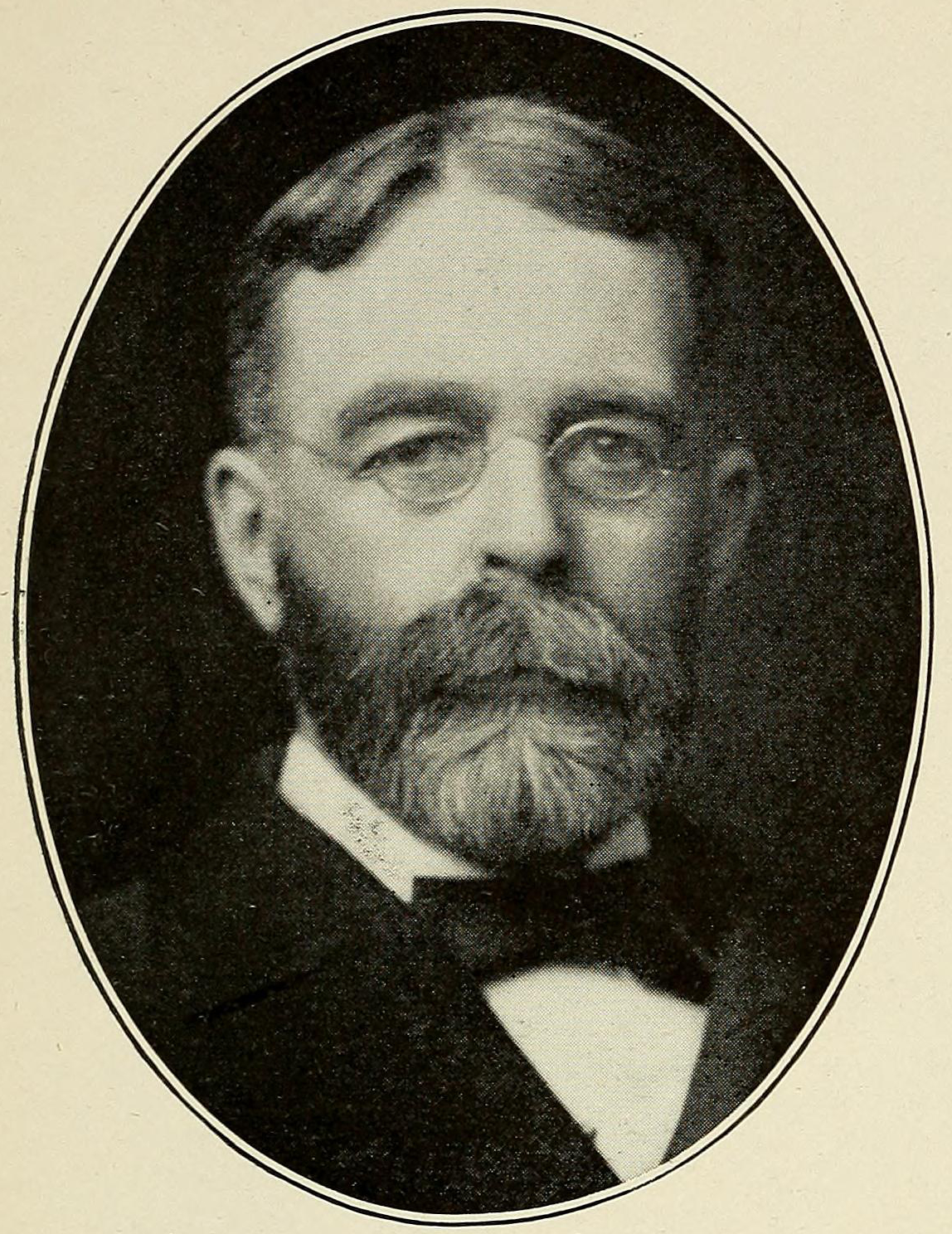

15th Lieutenant Governor of Minnesota
- In office January 3, 1899 – January 5, 1903
- Governor: John Lind; Samuel Van Sant
- Preceded by: John L. Gibbs
- Succeeded by: Ray W. Jones

14th Minnesota Attorney General
- In office 1912–1918
- Governor: Adolph O. Eberhart; Winfield S. Hammond; J. A. A. Burnquist
- Preceded by: George T. Simpson
- Succeeded by: Clifford L. Hilton

Personal details
- Born: July 15, 1854 Boscawen, New Hampshire, U.S.
- Died: March 5, 1918 (aged 63) Saint Paul, Minnesota, U.S.
- Party: Republican
- Spouse: Dora Rogers
- Profession: educator, lawyer, state attorney general

Lyndon Ambrose Smith (July 15, 1854 – March 5, 1918) was an American educator, lawyer and Republican politician who served as the 14th attorney general of Minnesota and the 15th lieutenant governor of Minnesota.

== Life and career ==
Smith was born in Boscawen, New Hampshire in 1854. His father Ambrose Smith was a clergyman and congregational pastor; his mother Cynthia Maria Egerton was a descendant of Mayflower passenger and Plymouth colony governor William Bradford. Smith attended Dartmouth College and served as the superintendent of schools in Norwich, Vermont while in school. He graduated as valedictorian in 1880. He later worked with the National Commissioner of Education and as the superintendent of the World Cotton Centennial's educational department. He also earned a law degree at Georgetown University Law Center.

In 1885, Smith moved to Minnesota, settling in Montevideo, Minnesota and establishing a law practice. In 1886, he married Dora Rogers, a teacher originally from Maine. Together they had a daughter Charlotte (b. 1888).

Smith's political career began in 1889 when he was elected attorney for Chippewa County, Minnesota. He served only one term but was later elected Lieutenant Governor under Republican John Lind in 1899 and re-elected under his successor Samuel Van Sant in 1901. He returned to the position of Chippewa County attorney from 1903 to 1909 when he was appointed as assistant state Attorney General. Smith later ran for the office of Attorney General as a Republican, winning his first term in 1912 and re-election in 1914 and 1916.

Smith died while in office on March 5, 1918. He is buried in Orchard Grove Cemetery in Kittery, Maine.

== Electoral history ==
- 1912 Race for Attorney General (Republican Primary)
  - Lyndon A. Smith 84,816
  - Thomas Fraser 56,137
- 1912 Race for Attorney General (General Election)
  - Lyndon A. Smith (Republican) 166,950
  - William F. Donohue (Democrat) 83,997
  - J. H. Morse (Prohibition) 27,140
- 1914 Race for Attorney General (Republican Primary)
  - Lyndon A. Smith 104,653
  - James Manahan 76,110
- 1914 Race for Attorney General (General Election)
  - Lyndon A. Smith (Republican) 195,372
  - Neil M. Cronin (Democrat) 94,025
  - August V. Rieke (Progressive) 16,736
- 1916 Race for Attorney General (General Election)
  - Lyndon A. Smith (Republican) 263,285 (unopposed)

Party political offices
Preceded by George T. Simpson	Republican nominee for Attorney General of Minnesota; 1912, 1914, 1916	Succeeded by Clifford L. Hilton
Political offices
Preceded by John L. Gibbs	Lieutenant Governor of Minnesota; 1899 – 1903	Succeeded by Ray W. Jones
Legal offices
Preceded by George T. Simpson	Minnesota Attorney General; 1912 – 1918	Succeeded by Clifford L. Hilton
