= John L. Gibbs =

American politician (1838–1908)

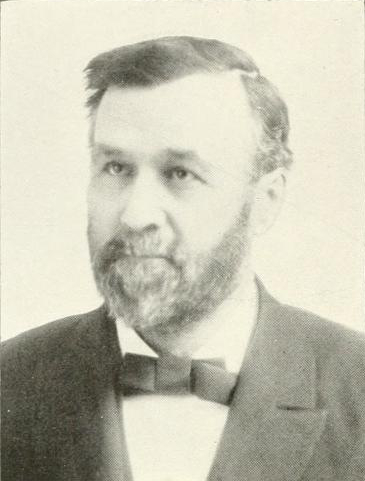

14th Lieutenant Governor of Minnesota
- In office January 5, 1897 – January 3, 1899
- Governor: David Marston Clough
- Preceded by: Frank A. Day
- Succeeded by: Lyndon A. Smith

14th Speaker of the Minnesota House of Representatives
- In office 1877–1877
- Preceded by: William R. Kinyon
- Succeeded by: Charles A. Gilman

17th Speaker of the Minnesota House of Representatives
- In office 1885–1885
- Preceded by: Loren Fletcher
- Succeeded by: William Rush Merriam

Member of the Minnesota House of Representatives
- In office 1864-1866; 1876-1878; 1885-1887; 1895-1897

Personal details
- Born: May 3, 1838 Bradford County, Pennsylvania, U.S.
- Died: November 28, 1928 (aged 90) Owatonna, Minnesota, U.S.
- Party: Republican
- Spouse: Martha Partridge Robson
- Profession: farmer, lawyer, county attorney, legislator, railroad commissioner

John La Porte Gibbs (May 3, 1838 – November 28, 1908) was a Minnesota legislator, two-time speaker of the Minnesota House of Representatives and the 14th lieutenant governor of Minnesota.

== Life and career ==
Gibbs was born in Bradford County, Pennsylvania, in 1838 to Eli and Caroline Gibbs (née Atwood), both of whom were descendants of early settlers of Massachusetts and Connecticut (respectively). He was raised on his parents farm and attended schools in Le Raysville, Pennsylvania and at the Susquehanna Collegiate Institute in Towanda, Pennsylvania, before attending the University of Michigan Law School, graduating in 1861.

Gibbs moved west, traveling through Illinois and Iowa before settling in Albert Lea, Minnesota, and working as a teacher. In 1862 he was elected attorney for Freeborn County, Minnesota. In 1863 he was elected to his first of five terms in the Minnesota House of Representatives as a Republican, serving from 1864 to 1866, 1876–1878, 1885–1887 and 1895–1897. He also twice served as speaker, in 1877 and 1885. He had previously ran for governor of Minnesota in 1886, but was defeated in the primary. Due to vote-splitting among various candidates, the convention was won by Andrew Ryan McGill. He would run for governor a second time in 1896, once again losing the primary. Following his gubernatorial defeat, Gibbs would instead seek the office of Lieutenant Governor, a position he would succeed in being elected to. He would serve under Governor David Marston Clough from January 5, 1897, to January 3, 1899.

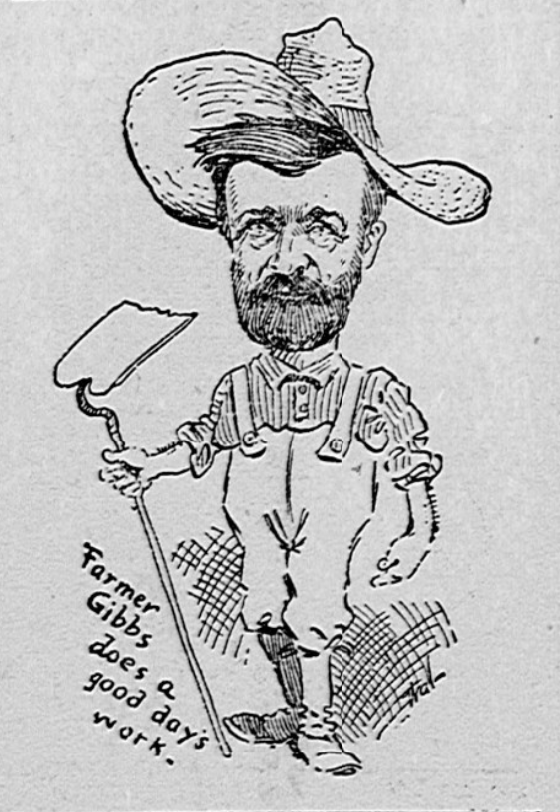
Caricature of John L. Gibbs

While he had studied law, Gibbs earned his living as a farmer and owned property outside Geneva, Minnesota. He occasionally lectured on agricultural topics and was particularly well known as a dairy farmer, even winning election as president of the Minnesota Dairymen's Association in 1893. For this, he would sometimes be nicknamed 'Farmer Gibbs'.

Gibbs died on November 28, 1908, in Owatonna, Minnesota.

Political offices
Preceded by Frank A. Day	Lieutenant Governor of Minnesota; 1897 – 1899	Succeeded by Lyndon A. Smith
Preceded by William R. Kinyon	Speaker of the Minnesota House of Representatives; 1877	Succeeded by Charles A. Gilman
Preceded by Loren Fletcher	Speaker of the Minnesota House of Representatives; 1885	Succeeded by William Rush Merriam
