= Gideon S. Ives =

American politician (1846–1927)

Gideon Sprague Ives
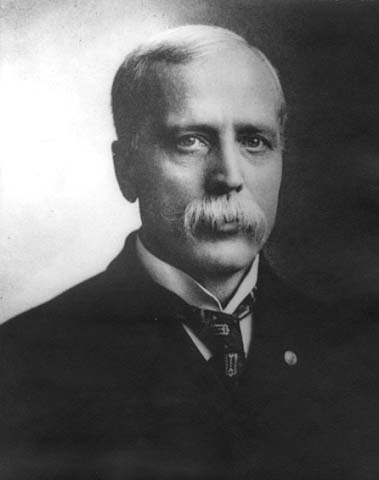

Member of the Minnesota Senate from the 27th district
- In office January 4, 1887 – January 5, 1891

11th Lieutenant Governor of Minnesota
- In office January 5, 1891 – January 3, 1893
- Governor: William Rush Merriam
- Preceded by: Albert E. Rice
- Succeeded by: David Marston Clough

Personal details
- Born: January 19, 1846 Dickinson, New York
- Died: December 20, 1927 (aged 81) Saint Paul, Minnesota
- Party: Republican
- Spouse: Mary Elizabeth Swift
- Education: University of Michigan Law School
- Profession: lawyer, politician, president of Minnesota Historical Society

Gideon Sprague Ives (January 19, 1846 – December 20, 1927) was an American politician who served as Mayor of St. Peter, Minnesota, Minnesota State Senator and as the 11th lieutenant governor of Minnesota.

== Life and career ==
Ives was born in Dickinson, New York in 1846. His parents Warren and Elizabeth Ives (née Ladd) were descendants of early American settlers with roots going as far back as the 1630s. Ives later moved to Potsdam, New York and, in 1864, enlisted in the 50th New York Volunteer Infantry Regiment taking part in the American Civil War. He was later transferred to the 15th New York Volunteer Infantry Regiment (with whom he served for the majority of the war) and was discharged from service in June 1865.

After the war Ives returned to Potsdam to continue his schooling. He later attended the University of Michigan Law School and, after graduating in 1871, relocated to St. Peter, Minnesota. He served in several local offices there including city attorney, mayor and Nicollet County attorney. In 1878 he married Mary Elizabeth Swift, daughter of Governor Henry A. Swift. He later won election to state office as a Republican, first to the Minnesota Senate in 1886 then as Lieutenant Governor under Governor William Rush Merriam in 1890. Ives was a candidate for the Republican nomination for governor in 1892 but was defeated by Knute Nelson.

While he did not hold another elected office, Ives remained active in state politics and later moved to St. Paul, Minnesota in 1902 to continue his law practice. Later in life he became an important figure to the Minnesota Historical Society, leading efforts to build a home for the organization's collections and library (now the Minnesota Judicial Center) and serving as its president from 1918 to 1921.

Ives died on December 20, 1927. He is buried in Oakland Cemetery in St. Paul, Minnesota.

== Publications ==
- Ives, Gideon S. 1919. "William Gates Le Duc". Minnesota History Bulletin. 3.

Political offices
Preceded by Albert E. Rice	Lieutenant Governor of Minnesota; 1891 – 1893	Succeeded by David Marston Clough
