= William H. Yale =

American politician (1831–1917)

William Hall Yale
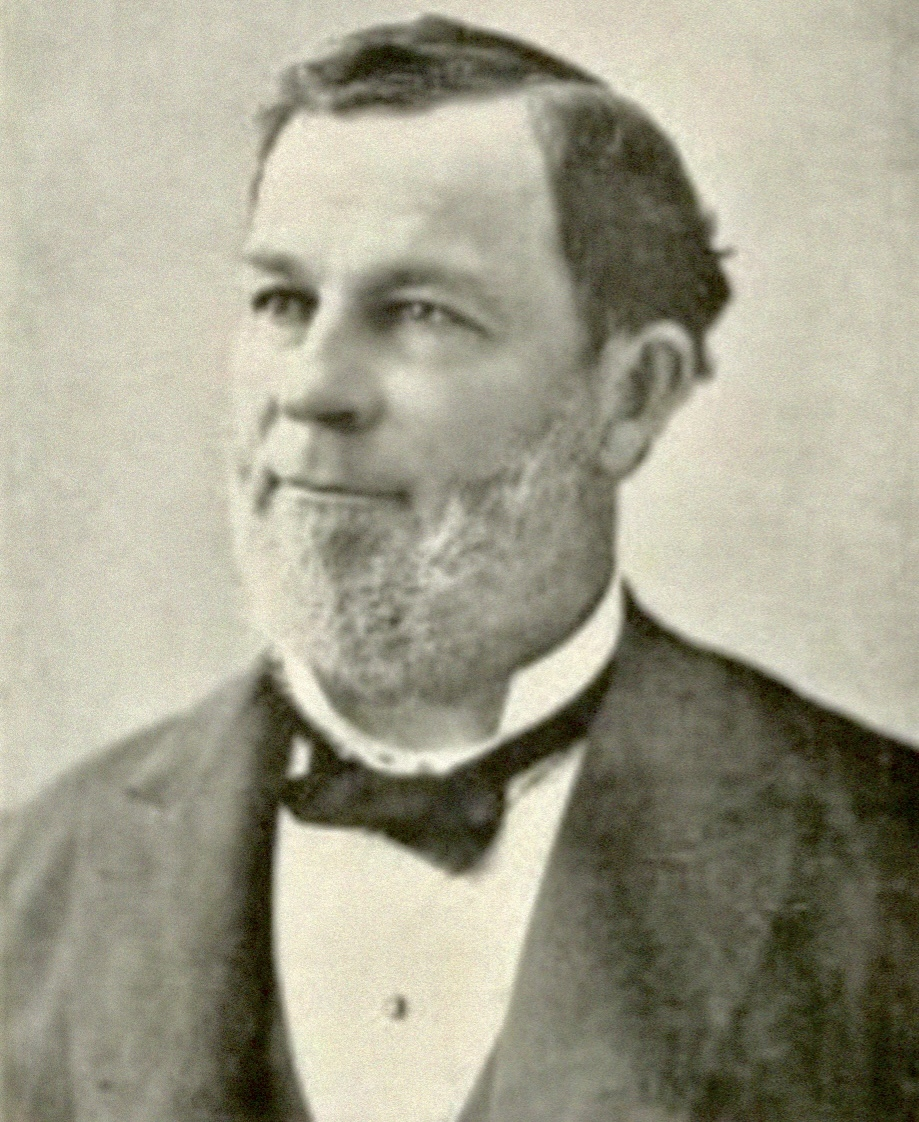

Member of the Minnesota House of Representatives from the 2nd district
- In office January 3, 1899 – January 7, 1901

Member of the Minnesota State Senate from the 15th district
- In office January 8, 1895 – January 2, 1899

Member of the Minnesota State Senate from the 8th district
- In office January 4, 1876 – January 7, 1878

6th Lieutenant Governor of Minnesota
- In office January 7, 1870 – January 9, 1874
- Governor: Horace Austin
- Preceded by: Thomas H. Armstrong
- Succeeded by: Alphonso Barto

5th President of the Minnesota Senate
- In office 1870–1874
- Governor: Horace Austin
- Preceded by: Thomas H. Armstrong
- Succeeded by: Alphonso Barto

Member of the Minnesota State Senate from the 11th district
- In office January 8, 1867 – January 6, 1868

Personal details
- Born: November 12, 1831 New Haven, Connecticut
- Died: January 25, 1917 (aged 85) Saint Paul, Minnesota
- Party: Republican
- Spouse(s): Sarah E. Banks (1851), Mary L. Hoyt (1872)
- Profession: lawyer

William Hall Yale (November 12, 1831 – January 25, 1917) was a Minnesota lawyer and Republican politician who served as Senator and the sixth lieutenant governor of Minnesota. He was made regent of the University of Minnesota in 1894 by Governor Nelson, and was a member of the Episcopal Church.

== Biography ==
=== Early life ===
Yale was born on November 12, 1831, in New Haven, Connecticut, to Wooster Yale and Lucy Yale (née Hall), members of the Yale family. His father was the great-great-grandson of Capt. Theophilus Yale, and a descendant of Capt. Thomas Yale, uncle of Elihu Yale of Yale University. He was an extensive shoe manufacturer, and later Sheriff's deputy of New Haven County, and lived on the ancestral estate of Capt. Thomas Yale who settled in that place in 1670.

After attending school in Wallingford, Connecticut, and at Suffield Academy he worked as a teacher in Norwalk, Connecticut, for 5 years. One of his school mates was Gen. Joseph Roswell Hawley, later United States Senator and Governor of Connecticut. In 1854 he changed careers and worked as a bookkeeper for the Sharps Rifle Manufacturing Company. In 1857, he decided to move west to Minnesota.

=== Career ===
Yale settled in Winona, Minnesota. Shortly after arriving Yale was admitted to the bar (he had been studying law in his spare time for several years) and began practicing. He initially was a partner of Judge William B. Mitchell, then formed a law practice under Yale & Webber. His early associates were Senator Daniel Sheldon Norton, Secretary of the Treasury and Senator William Windom, Congressman Thomas Wilson, and attorney general Charles H. Berry.

He was quickly elected to local office in Winona as city justice, probate judge, and prosecutor. In 1867 he was elected to the Minnesota State Senate. In 1869 he was elected Lieutenant Governor under Governor Horace Austin, serving from January 7, 1870, to January 9, 1874, succeeding banker Thomas H. Armstrong. Yale became the 5th President of the Minnesota Senate from 1870 to 1874, and was elected to the Minnesota State Senate again in 1875.

An active member of the Republican party, Yale was a delegate to 2 different national conventions: the 1876 Republican National Convention (which he was unable to attend due to illness) and the 1892 Republican National Convention in Minneapolis. He also led the Minnesota Republican conventions in 1872, 1873 and 1880.

In 1894 Governor Knute Nelson named Yale as a regent of the University of Minnesota. After he was once again elected to the Minnesota State Senate in 1895 the Minnesota Supreme Court ruled he could not serve as a regent until his term expired. In 1899 he was elected to his final term as a member of the Minnesota House of Representatives.

In his legal career Yale worked with many other legal and political figures in the state including Daniel Sheldon Norton, William Windom and Thomas Wilson.

=== Personal life ===
Yale was a member of the Episcopal Church. In 1851 he married Sarah E. Banks of Norwalk, Connecticut. They had one son (Charles B. Yale). Sarah died in 1871. In 1872 he remarried to Mary Louisa Hoyt. They had one son (William Hoyt Yale).

Charles was general claim agent of the Great Northern Railway, owned by Canadians Lord Stephen and Lord Smith, and American John Kennedy. His son William was a member and stockholder of the American Philatelic Society, with members including President Franklin D. Roosevelt and his Secretary Harold L. Ickes.

=== Death ===
Yale died in 1917 and is buried in Oakland Cemetery in St. Paul, Minnesota.

Political offices
Preceded by Thomas H. Armstrong	Lieutenant Governor of Minnesota; 1870 – 1874	Succeeded by Alphonso Barto
