= Thomas H. Armstrong =

American politician (1829–1891)

Thomas Henry Armstrong
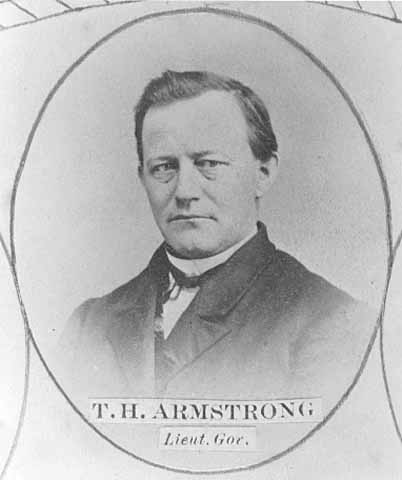
- Armstrong in ~1867

5th Lieutenant Governor of Minnesota
- In office January 8, 1866 – January 7, 1870
- Governor: William Rainey Marshall
- Preceded by: Charles D. Sherwood
- Succeeded by: William H. Yale

7th Speaker of the Minnesota House of Representatives
- In office 1864?–1865
- Preceded by: Jared Benson
- Succeeded by: James B. Wakefield

Personal details
- Born: February 6, 1829 Milan, Ohio
- Died: December 29, 1891 (aged 62) Albert Lea, Minnesota
- Party: Republican
- Spouse: Elizabeth M. Burgess Butman
- Profession: banker, lawyer, legislator

Thomas Henry Armstrong (February 6, 1829 – December 29, 1891) was a Minnesota banker, lawyer, legislator, and the fifth lieutenant governor of Minnesota. He became Lieutenant Governor under Governor William Rainey Marshall from January 8, 1866, to January 7, 1870. Armstrong served in the Minnesota Constitutional Convention and both houses of the Minnesota State Legislature. He died in 1891 in Albert Lea, Minnesota.

== Biography ==
Thomas Henry Armstrong was born in Milan, Ohio, on February 6, 1829, the son of Augustus Armstrong (1790-1862) and Phebe Higby (1805-1864).

His father was born in Rhode Island but later moved to Milan, Ohio, where he married Phebe Higby. Following this, he settled down and became a farmer.

Thomas studied in Milan, Ohio for a couple of years before moving to Minnesota in 1855, where he settled in High Forest, Minnesota. Before the outbreak of the Civil war, he was originally a Douglas Democrat, but when the war broke out, he became a staunch Republican He stayed in High Forest until he moved to Albert Lea in April 1875.

== Political career ==
In 1873, he ran for Governor of Minnesota. He dropped out during the Republican primary, after the second ballot.

In the autumn of 1874, he ran as an independent for the State Senate, an endeavor in which he was successful.

== Notes ==
Political offices
Preceded by Charles D. Sherwood	Lieutenant Governor of Minnesota; 1866 – 1870	Succeeded by William H. Yale
Preceded by Jared Benson	Speaker of the Minnesota House of Representatives; 1864? – 1865	Succeeded by James B. Wakefield
