= David Marston Clough =

American politician

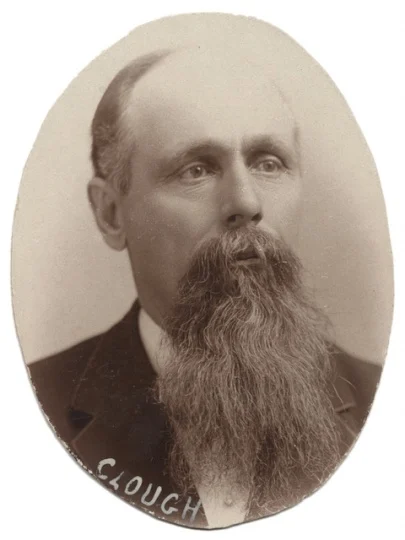
- Clough in 1895

13th Governor of Minnesota
- In office January 31, 1895 – January 2, 1899
- Lieutenant: Frank A. Day; John L. Gibbs
- Preceded by: Knute Nelson
- Succeeded by: John Lind

12th Lieutenant Governor of Minnesota
- In office January 9, 1893 – January 31, 1895
- Governor: Knute Nelson
- Preceded by: Gideon S. Ives
- Succeeded by: Frank A. Day

Member of the Minnesota Senate
- In office 1887-1893

Personal details
- Born: December 27, 1846 Lyme, New Hampshire, U.S.
- Died: August 28, 1924 (aged 77) Everett, Washington
- Resting place: Evergreen Cemetery
- Party: Republican
- Spouse: Addie Barton
- Profession: lumberman
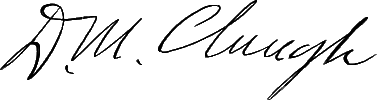
- Signature

David Marston Clough (December 27, 1846 – August 28, 1924) was an American lumberman and politician. He served in the Minnesota State Senate from January 1887 to January 1893. He served as the state's 12th lieutenant governor, January 9, 1893 to January 31, 1895. He was the 13th governor of Minnesota from January 31, 1895 to January 2, 1899. He was a Republican.

== Life and career ==
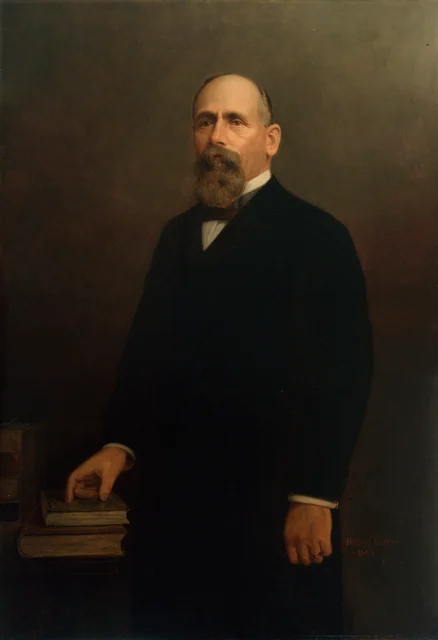
David M. Clough Official Portrait

Clough was born in 1846 in Lyme, New Hampshire, the fourth of fourteen children of Sarah C. (Brown) and Elbridge G. Clough, New England farmers who resettled near the Rum River. Clough helped his family eke out a scanty living from the land by raising crops and cutting timber. His boyhood experiences would serve him well as both an entrepreneur and public servant in a state where agriculture and lumber dominated the economy.

Clough's first business venture, a logging operation he founded at 20, lifted him from poverty and launched him on a path toward wealth and political prominence. He moved to Minneapolis in 1872 and was elected to the city council eleven years later and then to the Minnesota Senate. From the Senate, he advanced to the office of lieutenant governor under Republican Knute Nelson, whose election to the U.S. Senate moved Clough into the governor's office.

Clough's first administration was notable for the ratification of significant amendments to the state constitution, including those establishing the Minnesota Board of Pardons, withdrawing the right of aliens to vote, and authorizing municipalities to frame "home rule" charters. During his second term, narrowly won in 1896, the legislature raised taxes on several private industries and enacted child-labor laws.

In 1900 the redoubtable railroad magnate James J. Hill urged Clough to establish a lumber operation near Puget Sound. Until his death on August 28, 1924, at age 77, the logger-turned-lumber baron lived in Everett, Washington, where he championed the interests of the mill owners against their employees' unionization efforts. He was buried at Evergreen Cemetery in Everett.

Clough is the namesake of Culdrum Township, Morrison County, Minnesota.

Party political offices
Preceded by Knute Nelson	Republican nominee for Governor of Minnesota; 1896	Succeeded by William Henry Eustis
Political offices
Preceded by Gideon S. Ives	Lieutenant Governor of Minnesota; 1893–1895	Succeeded by Frank A. Day
Preceded by Knute Nelson	Governor of Minnesota; 1895–1899	Succeeded by John Lind
