= James Wakefield =

American politician (1825–1910)

James Beach Wakefield
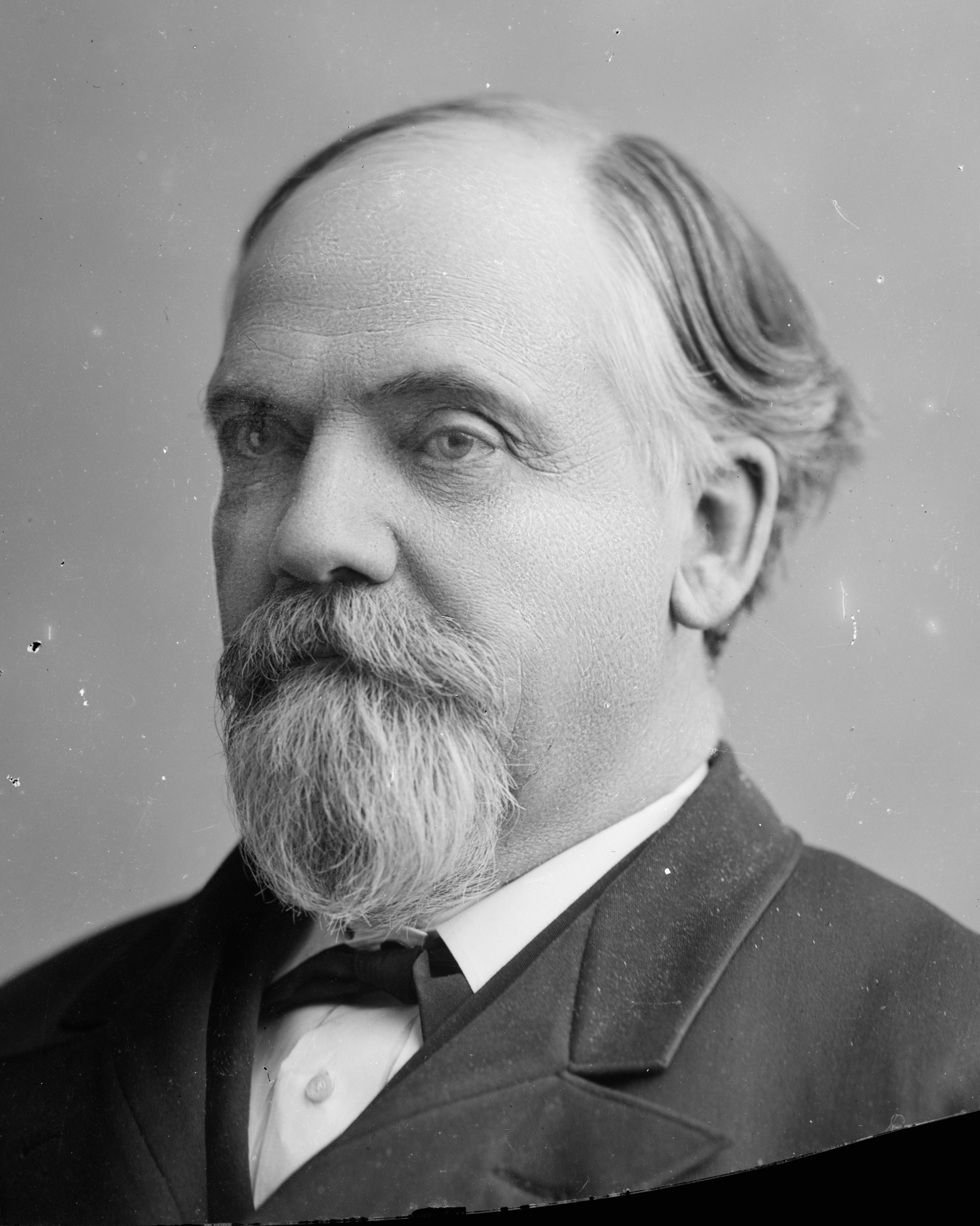

8th Lieutenant Governor of Minnesota
- In office January 7, 1876 – January 10, 1880
- Governor: Cushman Davis; John S. Pillsbury
- Preceded by: Alphonso Barto
- Succeeded by: Charles A. Gilman

Member of the U.S. House of Representatives from Minnesota's 2nd district
- In office March 4, 1883 – March 3, 1887
- Preceded by: Horace B. Strait
- Succeeded by: John Lind

8th Speaker of the Minnesota House of Representatives
- In office 1866–1866
- Preceded by: Jared Benson
- Succeeded by: John Q. Farmer

Member of the Minnesota Senate
- In office 1867-1869

Member of the Minnesota House of Representatives
- In office 1858; 1863; 1866

Personal details
- Born: March 21, 1825 Winsted, Connecticut, U.S.
- Died: August 25, 1910 (aged 85) Blue Earth, Minnesota, U.S.
- Party: Republican
- Spouse: Nannette Reinhart
- Profession: lawyer, judge, politician

James Beach Wakefield (March 21, 1825 – August 25, 1910) was a United States representative from Minnesota. He was also the eighth lieutenant governor of Minnesota.

Wakefield was born in Winsted, Connecticut, to Dr. Luman Wakefield and Betsey Rockwell. His father was a Connecticut politician, and his brother was a doctor from Yale University, who married Sarah F. Wakefield. His niece was Helen Wakefield Yale, member of the Yale family and wife of Judge John H. Kennard. His sister, Lucy Clarissa, married to the son of Congressman Lancelot Phelps, and brother of Congressman James Phelps, whose father-in-law, Samuel Ingham, was also a congressman and senator from Connecticut.

James attended the public schools at Westfield, Massachusetts, and Jonesville, New York, graduated from Trinity College, Hartford, Connecticut, in 1846 and studied law in Painesville, Lake County, Ohio. He was admitted to the bar and commenced practice in Delphi, Indiana, in 1852. He moved to Shakopee, Minnesota, in 1854. He was first judge of the probate court of Faribault County, Minnesota.

He was elected as a member of the Minnesota House of Representatives in 1858, 1863, and 1866, serving as speaker in the session of 1866. He was elected as a member of the Minnesota State Senate 1867–1869. He was appointed receiver of the United States Land Office at Winnebago City Township, Minnesota, June 1, 1869, and served until January 15, 1875, when he resigned. He was the eighth lieutenant governor of Minnesota 1875–1877. In 1879, he was expected to be the Republican nominee for Governor that year, until incumbent John S. Pillsbury announced he was running for a third term. Wakefield was defeated in the primary. He was elected as a Republican to the 48th and 49th congresses, (March 4, 1883 – March 3, 1887).

He retired from public life and died at Blue Earth, Faribault County, Minnesota, with interment in Evergreen Cemetery, Painesville, Ohio.

Political offices
Preceded by Thomas H. Armstrong	Speaker of the Minnesota House of Representatives; 1866	Succeeded by John Q. Farmer
Preceded by Alphonso Barto	Lieutenant Governor of Minnesota; 1875–1877	Succeeded by Charles A. Gilman
U.S. House of Representatives
Preceded by Horace B. Strait	U.S. Representative from Minnesota's 2nd congressional district 1883–1887	Succeeded by John Lind
