= Albert E. Rice =

American politician

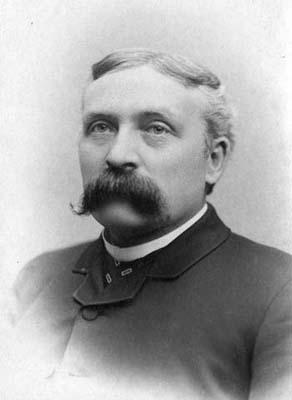
- Albert E. Rice

10th Lieutenant Governor of Minnesota
- In office January 4, 1887 – January 5, 1891
- Governor: Andrew Ryan McGill; William Rush Merriam
- Preceded by: Charles A. Gilman
- Succeeded by: Gideon S. Ives

Personal details
- Born: September 24, 1845 Vinje, Telemarken, Sweden-Norway
- Died: September 11, 1921 (aged 75) Rochester, Minnesota, U.S.
- Party: Republican
- Spouse: Sophia L. Rice
- Profession: banker, newspaperman, legislator, University of Minnesota regent

Albert E. Rice (September 24, 1845 – September 11, 1921) was an American banker, newspaperman, legislator, University of Minnesota regent, politician and the tenth lieutenant governor of Minnesota from Willmar. He served as a Republican from January 4, 1887, to January 5, 1891, under Governors Andrew Ryan McGill and William Rush Merriam.

He was in the Minnesota Senate for several terms, representing District 40 from 1874 to 1875, and again from 1878 to 1882, and District 36 from 1883 to 1886.

Rice gives his name to Rice Memorial Hospital in Willmar, a level 3 trauma center and the largest municipally owned hospital in Minnesota.

The Rice Mansion, Rice's former home, is located on the northern shore of Green Lake in Spicer and is a local landmark.

Political offices
Preceded by Charles A. Gilman	Lieutenant Governor of Minnesota; 1887–1891	Succeeded by Gideon S. Ives
