= Charles A. Gilman =

American politician (1833–1927)

Charles Gilman
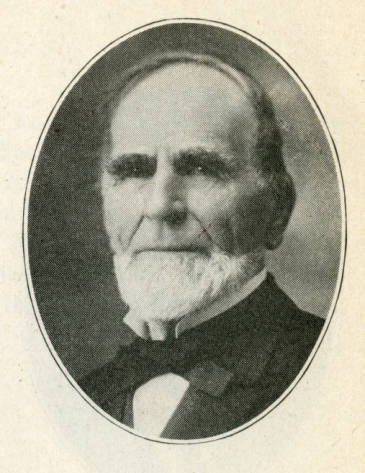
- Portrait of Charles Andrew Gilman in 1915

Member of the Minnesota House of Representatives from the 45th district
- In office January 5, 1915 – January 1, 1917

9th Lieutenant Governor of Minnesota
- In office January 10, 1880 – January 4, 1887
- Governor: John S. Pillsbury; Lucius Hubbard
- Preceded by: James Wakefield
- Succeeded by: Albert E. Rice

15th Speaker of the Minnesota House of Representatives
- In office 1878–1879
- Preceded by: John L. Gibbs
- Succeeded by: Loren Fletcher

Member of the Minnesota House of Representatives from the 31st district
- In office January 5, 1875 – January 9, 1880

Member of the Minnesota Senate for the 3rd District
- In office January 7, 1868 – January 3, 1870

Personal details
- Born: February 9, 1833 Gilmanton, New Hampshire, U.S.
- Died: June 7, 1927 (aged 94) St. Cloud, Minnesota, U.S.
- Party: Republican
- Spouse: Hester Cronk
- Profession: farmer, lawyer, legislator

Charles Andrew Gilman (February 9, 1833 – June 7, 1927) was a Republican legislator, Speaker of the Minnesota House of Representatives, and the ninth lieutenant governor of Minnesota.

== Life and career ==
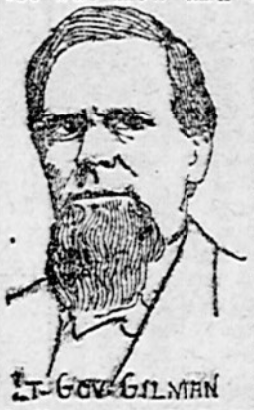
Newspaper Portrait, 1886

Gilman was born in 1833 in Gilmanton, New Hampshire, to Charles Gilman and Eliza Gilman (née Page). The Gilman family was a well established one in New England, with roots dating back to the 1630s. He attended school at Gilmanton Academy and later in East Andover, New Hampshire. After a brief career teaching in several different New Hampshire towns, he relocated to Sauk Rapids, Minnesota, in 1855.

Gilman quickly became involved in local politics and became register of deeds and county auditor for Benton County, Minnesota. On January 1, 1857, he married Hester Cronk, a native of Belleville, Ontario. In 1861 he was named the head of the United States General Land Office in St. Cloud, Minnesota, and relocated there. He was later reappointed to the same office in 1866 and again in 1869. During this time Gilman also explored the timber and mining industries, pursuing interests in Minnesota as well as Ontario and further west.

In 1867 Gilman was elected to the Minnesota Senate, serving until 1871. He was later elected to the Minnesota House in 1875 and served until 1880 (including as Speaker of the Minnesota House from 1878 to 1879). During both terms, Gilman was heavily involved in legislation surrounding railroads and supported the development of the Great Northern Railway (U.S.). He also won election as a Republican despite his district leaning heavily Democratic.

After serving in the legislature Gilman became Lieutenant Governor under Governors John S. Pillsbury and Lucius Hubbard from January 10, 1880, to January 4, 1887. He unsuccessfully ran for the Republican nomination for governor in 1886 and 1888. From 1894 to 1899 he was the Minnesota State Librarian.

Gilman later served one more term in the House, from 1915 to 1917. He died on June 7, 1927, in Saint Cloud, Minnesota.

Political offices
| Preceded by James Wakefield | Lieutenant Governor of Minnesota; 1880–1887 | Succeeded by Albert E. Rice |
| Preceded by John L. Gibbs | Speaker of the Minnesota House of Representatives; 1878–1879 | Succeeded by Loren Fletcher |
