= Senator Perpich =

Senator Perpich may refer to:

- Anthony J. Perpich (1932–2017), Minnesota State Senate
- George F. Perpich (1933–2018), Minnesota State Senate
- Rudy Perpich (1928–1995), Minnesota State Senate
