= Perpich =

Perpich is a surname, an anglicization of Prpić. Notable people with the surname include:

- Anthony J. Perpich (1932–2017), American politician
- George Perpich (American football) (1920–1993), American football player
- George F. Perpich (1933–2018), American politician
- Rudy Perpich (1928–1995), American politician
