= 1982 Minnesota gubernatorial election =

- November 2, 1982
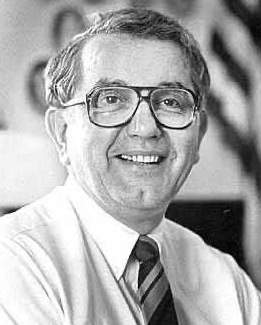

Nominee	Rudy Perpich	Wheelock Whitney, Jr.
Party	Democratic (DFL)	Ind.-Republican
Running mate	Marlene Johnson	Lauris Krenik
Popular vote	1,049,104	711,796
Percentage	58.76%	39.86%
- County results Perpich: 40–50% 50–60% 60–70% 70–80% 80–90% Whitney: 40–50% 50–60%
Governor before election
Al Quie
Ind.-Republican
Elected Governor
Rudy Perpich
Democratic (DFL)

The 1982 Minnesota gubernatorial election took place on November 2, 1982. Incumbent Governor Al Quie did not seek a second term. Minnesota Democratic–Farmer–Labor Party candidate Rudy Perpich defeated Independent-Republican Party challenger Wheelock Whitney, Jr. Warren Spannaus unsuccessfully ran for the Democratic nomination, while Lou Wangberg and Harold Stassen unsuccessfully ran for the Republican nomination. Perpich became the first candidate to receive over a million votes in a gubernatorial election in Minnesota.

== Independent-Republican primary ==
=== Candidates ===
- Harold Stassen, former governor of Minnesota (1939–43), president of the University of Pennsylvania, and perennial candidate
  - Running mate: Rollin Crawford, former mayor of West St. Paul
- Lou Wangberg, incumbent lieutenant governor of Minnesota since 1979
  - Running mate: James Lindau, mayor of Bloomington
- Wheelock Whitney Jr., investment banker, nominee for U.S. Senate in 1964, and former mayor of Wayzata
  - Running mate: Lauris Krenik, Madison Lake farmer and regent of the University of Minnesota

=== Results ===
1986 Independent-Republican gubernatorial primary
Party	Candidate	Votes	%
Ind.-Republican	Wheelock Whitney Jr.	185,801	60.07%
Ind.-Republican	Lou Wangberg	105,696	34.17%
Ind.-Republican	Harold Stassen	17,795	5.75%
Total votes		309,292	100.00%

== DFL primary ==
=== Candidates ===
- Rudy Perpich, former governor of Minnesota (1976–79)
  - Running mate: Marlene Johnson, St. Paul advertising and public relations executive
- Ellsworth W. Peterson, Tonka Bay aircraft mechanic
  - Running mate: Christine Peterson, Bloomington waitress and daughter of Ellsworth Peterson
- Warren Spannaus, former attorney general of Minnesota
  - Running mate: Carl M. Johnson, state representative from St. Peter

=== Endorsements ===
Rudy Perpich

Newspapers

- Faribault Daily News
- Swift County Monitor

=== Results ===
1982 DFL gubernatorial primary
Party	Candidate	Votes	%
Democratic (DFL)	Rudy Perpich	275,920	51.23%
Democratic (DFL)	Warren Spannaus	248,218	46.09%
Democratic (DFL)	Ellsworth W. Peterson	14,465	2.69%
Total votes		538,603	100.00%

== General election ==
=== Candidates ===
- Franklin Haws, St. Anthony physician and candidate for U.S. House in 1976 (Libertarian)
  - Running mate: Charles W. Bates, systems analyst for General Mills from Plymouth
- Tom McDonald, perennial candidate from Minneapolis (Honest Government 87)
  - Running mate: Earl Dettman, Minneapolis truck driver and perennial candidate
- Rudy Perpich, former governor of Minnesota (1976–79) (DFL)
  - Running mate: Marlene Johnson, St. Paul advertising and public relations executive
- Kathy Wheeler, unemployed iron miner (Socialist Workers)
  - Running mate: Carole Lesnick, member of the United Paper Workers union from Minneapolis
- Wheelock Whitney Jr., investment banker, nominee for U.S. Senate in 1964, and former mayor of Wayzata (Independent-Republican)
  - Running mate: Lauris Krenik, Madison Lake farmer and Regent of the University of Minnesota

The Wheeler-Lesnick ticket was the first all-woman gubernatorial ticket in Minnesota history.

=== Results ===
1982 gubernatorial election, Minnesota
Party	Candidate	Votes	%	±%
Democratic (DFL)	Rudy Perpich	1,049,104	58.76%	+13.46%
Ind.-Republican	Wheelock Whitney, Jr.	711,796	39.86%	−12.48%
Socialist Workers	Kathy Wheeler	10,332	0.58%	+0.18%
Honest Government 87	Tom McDonald	7,984	0.45%	+0.18%
Libertarian	Franklin Haws	6,323	0.35%	+0.12%
Majority		337,308	18.89%	
Turnout		1,785,539		
Democratic (DFL) gain from Ind.-Republican		Swing		
