= 1978 Minnesota gubernatorial election =

- November 7, 1978
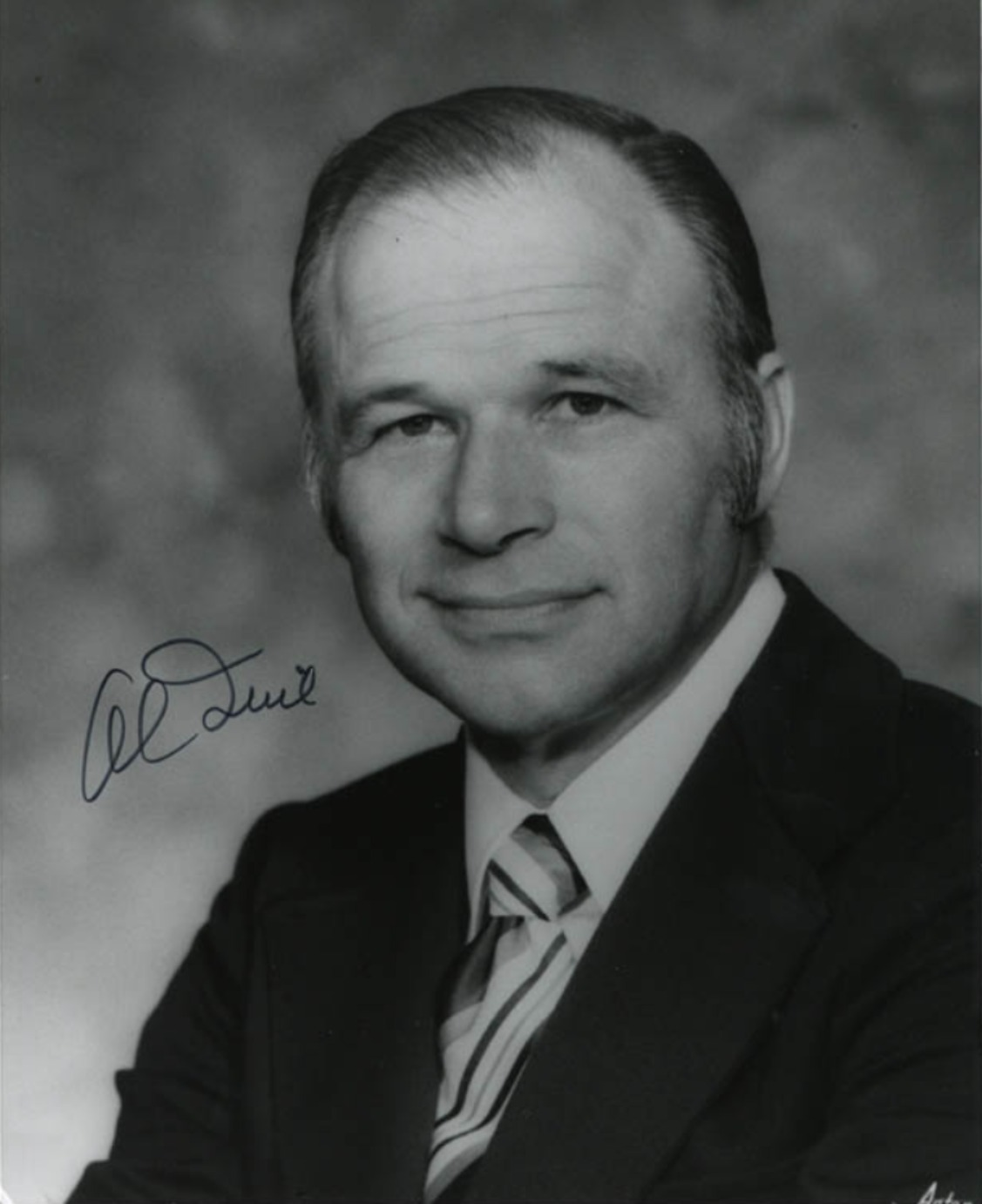

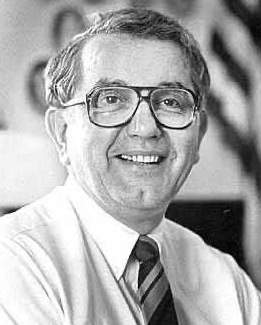
Nominee	Al Quie	Rudy Perpich
Party	Ind.-Republican	Democratic (DFL)
Running mate	Lou Wangberg	Alec Olson
Popular vote	830,019	718,244
Percentage	52.35%	45.30%
- County results Quie: 40–50% 50–60% 60–70% 70–80% Perpich: 40–50% 50–60% 60–70%
Governor before election
Rudy Perpich
Democratic (DFL)
Elected Governor
Al Quie
Ind.-Republican

The 1978 Minnesota gubernatorial election took place on November 7, 1978. Independent-Republican Party candidate U.S. House Rep Al Quie defeated Minnesota Democratic–Farmer–Labor Party incumbent Rudy Perpich.

Primary elections were held on September 12. Perpich and Quie each won their party's nomination easily over Alice Tripp and Robert W. Johnson, respectively. Richard Pedersen was unopposed for the minor American Party nomination.

Known as the "Minnesota Massacre", DFL candidates drew criticism when Wendell R. Anderson resigned so that Perpich could appoint him to fill Walter Mondale's vacant senate seat after Mondale was elected vice president. Anderson and Perpich were both defeated in their respective races.

This was the last election where a male was elected Lieutenant Governor of Minnesota until 2026.

== DFL primary ==
=== Candidates ===
- Rudy Perpich, incumbent governor of Minnesota since 1976
  - Running mate: Alec G. Olson, incumbent lieutenant governor since 1976
- Alice Tripp, Belgrade farmer and anti-power line activist
  - Running mate: Mike Casper, professor of physics

=== Results ===
1978 DFL gubernatorial primary
Party	Candidate	Votes	%
Democratic (DFL)	Rudy Perpich (incumbent)	390,069	80.04%
Democratic (DFL)	Alice Tripp	97,247	19.96%
Total votes		487,316	100.00%

== Independent-Republican primary ==
=== Candidates ===
- Bob Johnson, former state representative from St. Paul
  - Running mate: Roger Hanson, former state senator from Vergas
- Al Quie, U.S. representative from Dennison
  - Running mate: Lou Wangberg, Bemidji school superintendent

=== Results ===
1978 Ind.-Republican gubernatorial primary
Party	Candidate	Votes	%
Ind.-Republican	Al Quie	174,799	83.55%
Ind.-Republican	Bob Johnson	34,406	16.45%
Total votes		209,205	100.00%

== American primary ==
=== Candidates ===
- Richard Pedersen, New Brighton electronics engineer
  - Running mate: Joyce M. Baier, Minneapolis resident

=== Results ===
1978 American gubernatorial primary
Party	Candidate	Votes	%
American	Richard Pedersen	4,277	100.00%
Total votes		4,277	100.00%

== General election ==
=== Candidates ===
- Jill Lakowske, Minneapolis resident (Socialist Workers)
  - Marc Shaver, St. Paul steelworker
- Tom McDonald, perennial candidate from Minneapolis (Honest Government)
  - Running mate: Russ Payzant, Minneapolis resident
- Robin E. Miller, Anoka computer analyst (Libertarian)
  - Mary Rosenbauer, Bloomington resident
- Richard Pedersen, New Brighton electronics engineer (American)
  - Running mate: Joyce M. Baier, Minneapolis resident
- Rudy Perpich, incumbent governor of Minnesota since 1976 (DFL)
  - Running mate: Alec G. Olson, incumbent lieutenant governor since 1976
- Edwin Pommerening, Randolph farmer (Savings Account)
  - Robert m. Stegmaier, Lakeville resident
- Al Quie, U.S. representative from Dennison (Independent-Republican)
  - Running mate: Lou Wangberg, Bemidji school superintendent

=== Results ===
1978 gubernatorial election, Minnesota
Party	Candidate	Votes	%	±%
Ind.-Republican	Al Quie	830,019	52.35%	+22.99%
Democratic (DFL)	Rudy Perpich (incumbent)	718,244	45.30%	−17.51%
American	Richard Pedersen	21,058	1.33%	N/A
Socialist Workers	Jill Lakowske	6,287	0.40%	−0.34%
Independent	Tom McDonald	4,254	0.27%	n/a
Libertarian	Robin E. Miller	3,689	0.23%	+0.06%
Independent	Edwin Pommerening	2,043	0.13%	n/a
Majority		111,775	7.05%	
Turnout		1,585,594		
Ind.-Republican gain from Democratic (DFL)		Swing		
