= Prpić =

Prpić is a Croatian surname.

It is the second most common surname in the Lika-Senj County of Croatia.

People with the name include:

- Dominik Prpić (born 2004), Croatian footballer
- Filip Prpic (born 1982), Swedish tennis player of Croatian descent
- Goran Prpić (born 1964), Croatian tennis coach and player
- Ivan Prpić (disambiguation), multiple people
- Joel Prpic (born 1974), Canadian-born Croatian ice hockey player
- Marin Prpić (born 1976), Croatian footballer

In the English-speaking world, it can be found as anglicized Perpich.
