= Alice Tripp =

- Born: Alice Raattama Tripp; August 22, 1918; Nashwauk, Minnesota, U.S
- Died: September 11, 2014 (aged 96); Belgrade, Minnesota, U.S
- Education: Lawrence University
- Political party: DFL
- Movement: Anti-power line

Alice Raatama Tripp (August 22, 1918 - September 11, 2014) was an American anti-power line activist, English teacher, and farmer who ran for President of the United States in the 1980 Democratic party presidential primary, receiving two delegates at the convention. Tripp also ran for Governor of Minnesota in the 1978 election as a primary challenger to incumbent governor Rudy Perpich but was defeated.

== Early life and career ==
Alice Raattama Tripp was born on August 22, 1918, in Nashwauk, Minnesota to Finnish and Swedish immigrant, Republican parents. She attended Hibbing Junior College where she fell in love with her chemistry lab partner, John Tripp. The couple married in 1942 after Tripp graduated from Lawrence College. The couple briefly lived in Detroit and Chicago before moving back to Minnesota and buying a 250-acre farm in 1957. She taught English in Belgrade, Minnesota for over ten years.

=== Anti-power line movement ===
In the early 1970s, the proposed CU Powerline would have cut across 8,000 acres of farmland in North Dakota and Minnesota, which caused much controversy in rural areas. In an April 1978 poll, the Minneapolis Tribune asked Minnesotans whether they sided with the farmers or the utilities. Sixty-three percent said they sided with the farmers. Among rural Minnesotans, support for the farmers ran at 70 percent.

Tripp led opposition to the power line and campaigned against it, supported by Karen Clark. In order to gain publicity, she performed stunts such as presenting an armed state trooper with flowers and throwing snow into a cement truck to delay construction. While campaigning against the power line, she was arrested three times, being known to resist arrest. Tripp was a member of the National People's Action group. The CU Powerline became fully operational in August 1979.

=== Personal life ===
Tripp died on September 11, 2014. She was married to her husband until he died of a heart-irregularity in 2005.

== Political campaigns ==
=== 1978 gubernatorial campaign ===
A leftist, Tripp ran for Governor of Minnesota in the 1978 election as a primary challenger to incumbent governor Rudy Perpich as part of her anti-power line activism, she received a total of 19.96%, performing well in rural areas and winning over 97,000 thousand votes despite spending only $5,000 on her campaign. Her running mate was Carleton College physics professor, Mike Casper. The Democratic Party of Pope County had encouraged her to run and endorsed her campaign, she finished with nearly 44% in the county. She campaigned on anti-war sentiment, abortion rights, and women's rights.

=== 1980 presidential campaign ===
In 1980, Tripp ran for President of the United States in the Democratic Party primary in order to garner support for the anti-power line movement. She was unable to gain the required number of delegate signatures and endorsed Ron Dellums and spoke in his support at the 1980 Democratic National Convention in New York City. She received votes of two delegates at the convention.
