= 1974 Minnesota gubernatorial election =

- November 5, 1974
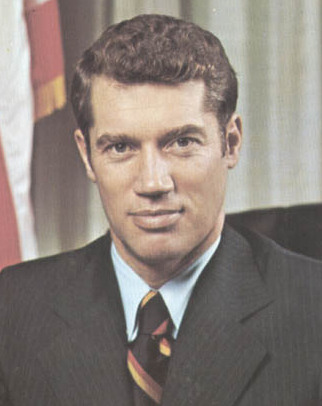

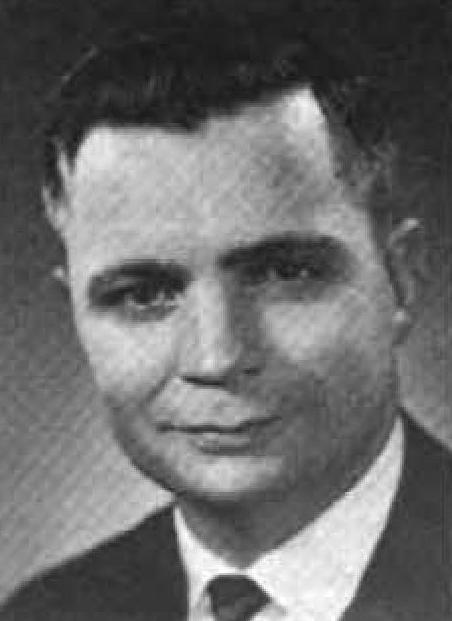
Nominee	Wendell Anderson	John W. Johnson
Party	Democratic (DFL)	Republican
Running mate	Rudy Perpich	Dwaine Hoberg
Popular vote	786,787	376,722
Percentage	62.80%	29.35%
- County results Anderson: 40–50% 50–60% 60–70% 70–80%
Governor before election
Wendell Anderson
Democratic (DFL)
Elected Governor
Wendell Anderson
Democratic (DFL)

The 1974 Minnesota gubernatorial election took place on November 5, 1974. This was the first election in which the governor and lieutenant governor ran on the same ticket. Minnesota Democratic–Farmer–Labor Party candidate Wendell Anderson defeated Republican Party of Minnesota challenger John W. Johnson.

Anderson won every county in the state, becoming the first person to do so in a gubernatorial election since Joseph Burnquist in 1916, and is to date the last gubernatorial candidate to do so, although Attorney General Skip Humphrey won every county in 1994.

This was the first gubernatorial election with eight candidates on the ballot, as well as the first election to feature a Libertarian Party ticket on a Minnesota ballot.

== DFL primary ==
=== Candidates ===
- Wendell Anderson, incumbent governor since 1971
  - Running mate: Rudy Perpich, incumbent lieutenant governor since 1971
- Tom McDonald, perennial candidate from Minneapolis
  - Running mate: Marvin Eakman, perennial candidate from Minneapolis

=== Results ===
1974 DFL gubernatorial primary
Party	Candidate	Votes	%
Democratic (DFL)	Wendell Anderson (incumbent)	254,671	78.23%
Democratic (DFL)	Tom McDonald	70,871	21.77%
Total votes		325,542	100.00%

== Republican primary ==
=== Candidates ===
- John W. Johnson, state representative from Minneapolis
  - Running mate: Dwaine Hoberg, mayor of Moorhead and former Moorhead State University football coach

=== Results ===
1974 Republican gubernatorial primary
Party	Candidate	Votes	%
Republican	John Warren Johnson	136,395	100.00%
Total votes		136,395	100.00%

== General election ==
=== Candidates ===
- Wendell Anderson, incumbent governor since 1971 (DFL)
  - Running mate: Rudy Perpich, incumbent lieutenant governor since 1971
- John W. Johnson, state representative from Minneapolis (Republican)
  - Running mate: Dwaine Hoberg, mayor of Moorhead and former Moorhead State University football coach
- Richard Kleinow, North Oaks resident (Libertarian)
  - Running mate: Claudia Jensen, Apple Valley resident
- Erwin Marquist, University of Minnesota physics professor (Communist)
  - Running mate: James Flower, retired Minneapolis building tradesman
- Jim Miles, electrical engineer (Independent)
  - Running mate: Laura Miles, non-practicing attorney and wife of James Miles
- Harry Pool, mayor of Independence (American)
  - Running mate: Elvera Jaspersen, state campaign director for John Schmitz in 1972
- Jane Van Deusen, Minneapolis registered nurse (Socialist Workers)
  - Running mate: Ralph Schwartz, Minneapolis junior high science teacher

=== Results ===
1974 Minnesota gubernatorial election
Party	Candidate	Votes	%	±%
Democratic (DFL)	Wendell Anderson (incumbent)	786,787	62.80%	+8.76%
Republican	John W. Johnson	376,722	29.35%	−16.18%
Independent	James Miles	60,150	4.80%	n/a
American	Harry Pool	20,454	1.63%	n/a
Socialist Workers	Jane VanDeusen	9,232	0.74%	n/a
Communist	Erwin Marquit	3,570	0.28%	n/a
Industrial Government	Genevieve Gunderson	2,720	0.22%	−0.13%
Libertarian	Richard Kleinow	2,115	0.17%	n/a
Majority		419,065	33.45%	
Turnout		1,252,750		
Democratic (DFL) hold		Swing		
