= George Perpich =

George Perpich may refer to:

- George Perpich (American football), American football player
- George F. Perpich, American dentist and politician
