= Lou Wangberg =

American politician and former lieutenant governor of Minnesota

Louis Wangberg
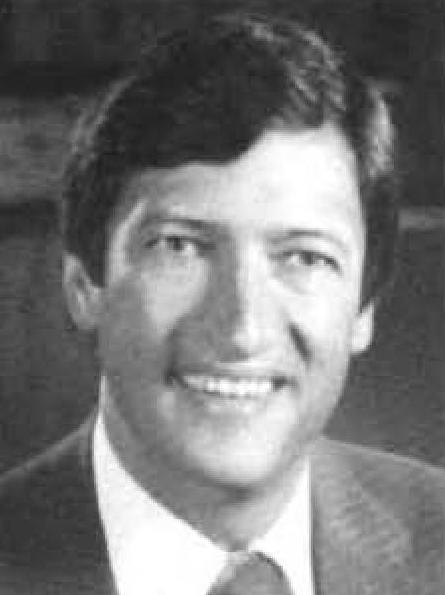
- Wangberg in 1981

41st Lieutenant Governor of Minnesota
- In office January 1, 1979 – January 3, 1983
- Governor: Al Quie
- Preceded by: Alec G. Olson
- Succeeded by: Marlene Johnson

Personal details
- Born: March 27, 1941 (age 85) Bemidji, Minnesota, U.S.
- Party: Republican
- Spouse: Jane Ormiston (until 1988)
- Children: 3
- Profession: School superintendent, educator

Louis Wangberg (born March 27, 1941) is an American educator who was the 41st lieutenant governor of Minnesota. He was elected on the Independent-Republican ticket with Governor Al Quie and served from January 1, 1979, to January 3, 1983. He also served as Quie's chief of staff for part of the term until he sought the governor's office on his own. In 1982, when Quie chose not to run for reelection, Wangberg was the Independent-Republican endorsed candidate for governor, but lost the primary to Wheelock Whitney. (DFL nominee Rudy Perpich won the election.)

Wangberg first sought the congressional nomination for the Seventh District when Bob Bergland vacated the office to become Jimmy Carter's Secretary of Agriculture. He lost the primary to Arlan Stangeland. Before becoming lieutenant governor, Wangberg served as a school superintendent in Bemidji. After his term of office he was an executive with the Jostens Corporation, a management consultant, professional speaker, and the president of Flagler Career Institute.

Until Ben Schierer, Wangberg was the last male to serve as Minnesota's lieutenant governor.

Wangberg lives in Oakland Park, Florida. He taught Advanced Placement American history and government/economics at Pembroke Pines Charter High School, the largest charter high school in the United States (1,700 students). He also served as a professor in the doctoral program at Northcentral University and the Keller Graduate School of Management.

Party political offices
Preceded by Dwaine Hoberg	Republican nominee for Lieutenant Governor of Minnesota; 1978	Succeeded by Lauris Krenik
Political offices
Preceded by Alec G. Olson	Lieutenant Governor of Minnesota; 1979–1983	Succeeded by Marlene Johnson
