= John Warren Johnson =

American politician (1929–2023)

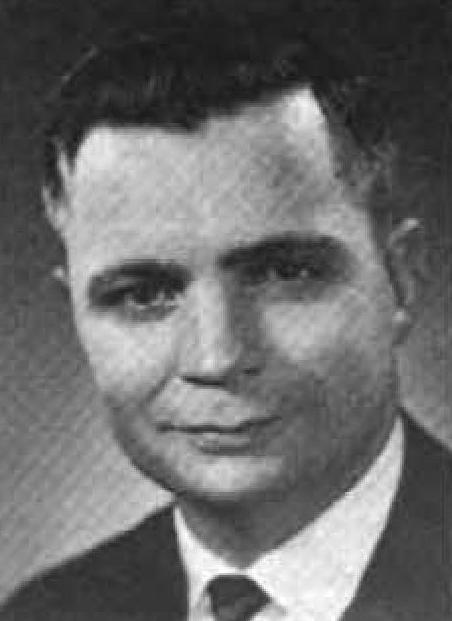
Johnson in the 1967 Minnesota Legislative Manual

John Warren Johnson (January 29, 1929 – January 6, 2023) was an American businessman and politician.

Born in Minneapolis, Minnesota, Johnson went to Southwest High School in Minneapolis. He then received his bachelor's degree in economics and political science from University of Minnesota in 1951. He then served in the United States Navy. He was the vice-president for the American Collectors Association. From 1963 to 1967, Johnson served on the Minneapolis City Council. Then, from 1966 to 1974, Johnson served in the Minnesota House of Representatives and was a Republican. In the 1974 election, Johnson was the Republican nominee for Governor of Minnesota and lost the election. Johnson died on January 6, 2023, at the age of 93.

== Notes ==
Party political offices
Preceded by Douglas M. Head	Republican nominee for Governor of Minnesota; 1974	Succeeded by Al Quie
