= Marlene Johnson =

American politician

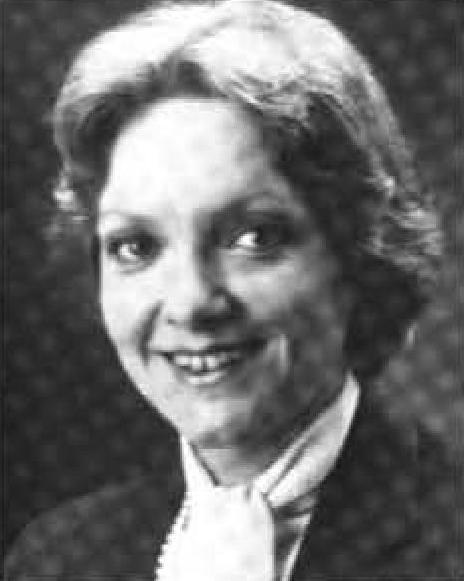
- Johnson in 1985

42nd Lieutenant Governor of Minnesota
- In office January 3, 1983 – January 7, 1991
- Governor: Rudy Perpich
- Preceded by: Lou Wangberg
- Succeeded by: Joanell Dyrstad

Personal details
- Born: January 11, 1946 (age 80) Braham, Minnesota, U.S.
- Party: Democratic (DFL)
- Profession: Advertising and public relations

Marlene Johnson (born January 11, 1946) is an American politician and businesswoman who served as the 42nd lieutenant governor of Minnesota, the first woman to hold the office. Since then, every lieutenant governor of Minnesota has been a woman. Johnson was elected as Governor Rudy Perpich's running mate and served from 1983 to 1991.

== Early life ==
Johnson was born and raised in Braham, Minnesota.

== Career ==
=== Politics ===
As lieutenant governor of Minnesota, Johnson focused on strengthening and expanding the state's connections with the world in trade, tourism, education, and the arts. She was a particularly outspoken advocate of international educational exchange at the secondary and post-secondary level. In 1988, Sweden awarded Johnson the Order of the Polar Star.

After leaving office in 1991, Johnson ran for mayor of Saint Paul, Minnesota, but lost the primary election to Norm Coleman. Later that year, President Bill Clinton appointed her associate administrator for management services and human resources in the General Services Administration.

=== Later career ===
Johnson served as the executive director of NAFSA: Association of International Educators, the world's largest nonprofit association dedicated to international education. NAFSA's nearly 10,000 members enable international education opportunities for thousands of students each year.

Johnson also serves on the board of the Communications Consortium Media Center in Washington, D.C., the advisory council of the US-China Education Trust, the Senior Advisory Council of Business for Diplomatic Action, and the advisory board of the Center for Women's Intercultural Leadership at Saint Mary's College. She is a former board member of the Alliance for International Educational and Cultural Exchange at AFS Intercultural Programs, the World Press Institute, and the National Association of Women Business Owners.

== See also ==
- List of female governors in the United States
- List of female lieutenant governors in the United States

Party political offices
Preceded by Alec G. Olson	DFL nominee for Lieutenant Governor of Minnesota; 1982, 1986, 1990	Succeeded by Nancy Larson
Political offices
Preceded by Lou Wangberg	Lieutenant Governor of Minnesota; 1983–1991	Succeeded by Joanell Dyrstad
