= Fred Marshall (American politician) =

American politician

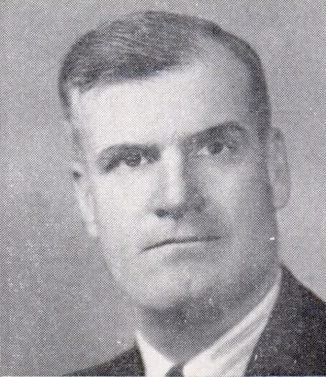

Member of the U.S. House of Representatives from Minnesota's 6th district
- In office January 3, 1949 – January 3, 1963
- Preceded by: Harold Knutson
- Succeeded by: Alec G. Olson

Personal details
- Born: March 13, 1906 Union Grove Township, U.S.
- Died: June 5, 1985 (aged 79) Litchfield, Minnesota, U.S.
- Party: Minnesota Democratic-Farmer-Labor Party

Fred Marshall (March 13, 1906 – June 5, 1985), was an American farmer and politician from Minnesota. A member of the Democratic–Farmer–Labor Party (DFL), he served seven terms as a member of the United States House of Representatives from 1949 to 1963.

== Early life and career ==
Marshall was born in Union Grove Township, near Grove City, Minnesota, and graduated from high school in Paynesville.

He engaged in farming and became a member of the Minnesota Agriculture Administration Committee, serving from 1937 to 1941. He then served as state director of the Farm Security Administration (later the Farmers Home Administration) from 1941 to 1948.

== Political career ==
He was a delegate to the Minnesota Democratic-Farmer-Labor Party (DFL) convention in 1966.

=== Congress ===
Marshall ran to represent Minnesota's 6th congressional district in the United States House of Representatives in 1948, defeating longtime incumbent Republican Harold Knutson by a margin of 52%–48%. He was reelected every two years until 1962, when he declined to seek reelection, and was succeeded by fellow DFLer Alec G. Olson.

== After Congress ==
After leaving Congress, Marshall resumed agriculture pursuits. He also became a member of the National Commission on Food Marketing and the United States Department of Agriculture Forest Appeals Board.

=== Death and burial ===
Marshall was a resident of Grove City, Minnesota, until his death in Litchfield, Minnesota, on June 5, 1985 and was interred in Burr Oak Cemetery on the family farm in Union Grove Township, Meeker County.

U.S. House of Representatives
Preceded by Harold Knutson	U.S. Representative from Minnesota's 6th congressional district 1949 – 1963	Succeeded by Alec G. Olson
