= Alec G. Olson =

American politician (born 1930)

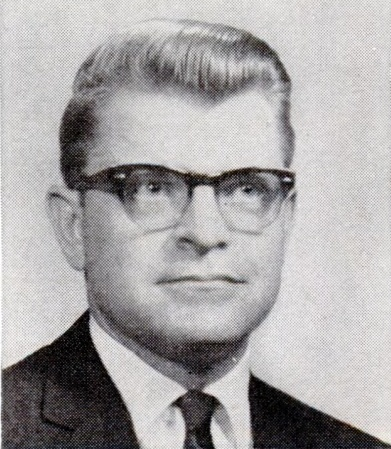
- Olson c. 1965

40th Lieutenant Governor of Minnesota
- In office December 29, 1976 – January 3, 1979
- Governor: Rudy Perpich
- Preceded by: Rudy Perpich
- Succeeded by: Lou Wangberg

President of the Minnesota Senate
- In office January 1973 – December 29, 1976
- Preceded by: Rudy Perpich (Lieutenant Governor)
- Succeeded by: Edward J. Gearty

Member of the Minnesota Senate
- In office May 14, 1969 – December 29, 1976
- Preceded by: Robert Johnson
- Succeeded by: Alvin Setzepfandt
- Constituency: 23rd district (1969–1973); 21st district (1973–1976)

Member of the U.S. House of Representatives from Minnesota's 6th district
- In office January 3, 1963 – January 3, 1967
- Preceded by: Fred Marshall
- Succeeded by: John M. Zwach

Personal details
- Born: Alec Gehard Olson; September 11, 1930 (age 95) Mamre Township, Minnesota, U.S.
- Party: Democratic
- Spouse: Janice Albrecht (m. 1957)
- Children: 4

Alec Gehard Olson (born September 11, 1930) is an American politician from the U.S. state of Minnesota who served as a member of the United States House of Representatives for two terms representing Minnesota's 6th congressional district from 1963 to 1967, a member of the Minnesota Senate from 1969 to 1976, and served as the 40th lieutenant governor of Minnesota from 1976 to 1979.

== Biography ==
Olson was born in Mamre Township, Kandiyohi County, Minnesota. Olson attended public schools and graduated from Willmar High School in 1948. He farmed between 1948 and 1955, and was an insurance representative from 1955 to 1962. He was active in the Minnesota Democratic-Farmer-Labor Party from 1952 to 1962, serving as a district chairman for four years. He was a delegate to the Democratic National Convention in the years 1960, 1964 and 1968.

Olson served in the United States House of Representatives from January 3, 1963, to January 3, 1967, during the 88th United States Congress and 89th United States Congress. During his time in the Congress, he voted for the Civil Rights Act of 1964. He was defeated for re-election in 1966 after two terms. Olson served in the Minnesota Senate from 1969 to 1976 and was President of the Minnesota Senate from 1973 to 1976. When Wendell R. Anderson resigned from the governorship to become a U.S. senator in 1976 and was succeeded by Lieutenant Governor Rudy Perpich, Olson became the new lieutenant governor; he served from December 29, 1976 to January 3, 1979, and was Perpich's running mate in their unsuccessful ticket for the Minnesota's 1978 gubernatorial race.

U.S. House of Representatives
Preceded by Fred Marshall	Member of the U.S. House of Representatives from Minnesota's 6th congressional district 1963–1967	Succeeded by John M. Zwach
Political offices
Preceded by Rudy Perpich as Lieutenant Governor of Minnesota	President of the Minnesota Senate; 1973–1976	Succeeded by Edward J. Gearty
Preceded by Rudy Perpich	Lieutenant Governor of Minnesota; 1976–1979	Succeeded by Lou Wangberg
Party political offices
Preceded by Rudy Perpich	Democratic nominee for Lieutenant Governor of Minnesota; 1978	Succeeded by Marlene Johnson
Honorary titles
Preceded by Merwin Coad	Most Senior Living U.S. Representative; Sitting or Former; 2025–present Served alongside: Don Fuqua	Current holder
U.S. order of precedence (ceremonial)
Preceded by Michelle Steel as Former U.S. Representative	Order of precedence of the United States as Former U.S. Representative	Succeeded by Mike Kopetski as Former U.S. Representative
