= Esther Tomljanovich =

American judge (1931–2026)

Associate Justice of the Minnesota Supreme Court
- In office 1990–1998
- Appointed by: Rudy Perpich

Personal details
- Born: Esther Jeanne Moellering; November 1, 1931 Galt, Iowa, U.S.
- Died: July 26, 2026 (aged 94) Lake Elmo, Minnesota, U.S.
- Spouse: Bill Tomljanovich (m. 1957; died 2025)
- Children: 1
- Education: St. Paul College of Law (LLB)

Esther Jeanne Tomljanovich (née Moellering; November 1, 1931 – July 26, 2026) was an American lawyer and judge who served as an associate justice of the Minnesota Supreme Court.

== Early life and education ==
Tomljanovich was born in Galt, Iowa, on November 1, 1931. She moved with her parents to Buck Lake in Itasca County, Minnesota. Thanks to a school teacher who boarded with the Moellering family during the depression, Tomljanovich had access to outside of school tutoring where she discovered her love for reading. She was inspired by the radio show Portia Moot, starring a woman lawyer of the same name who represented a very small minority of educated working women. Justice Tomljanovich explained that it was her desire to emulate Portia Moot that was at least partially responsible for her becoming a lawyer and a justice on the Minnesota Supreme Court.

She then attended Itasca Junior College for two years before moving to St. Paul for law school at age 19. Although she was the only woman in her class, she was treated well by the professors and her classmates and was never frightened of the experience. She explained that she never realized she had anything to fear, a state of mind passed down to her from her father. She worked at Minnesota Mutual Life Insurance Company while attending classes at the St. Paul College of Law (now Mitchell Hamline). She earned her degree in 1955, and shortly thereafter married her husband Bill Tomljanovich in 1957.

== Career ==
From 1957 to 1966, Tomljanovich served as the Assistant Revisor of Statutes for the State of Minnesota. Originally hired to do editorial work, she began to gradually take on the role of drafting bills and working with legislators.

In May 1966 Tomljanovich gave birth to her son William Tomljanovich and decided to be a stay at home mother to raise him. She continued working during this time, doing indexing work for West Publishing, editing practice manuals for Minnesota Continuing Legal Education, and bill drafting for some lobbying organizations. She also worked for the County Attorney's Association drafting proposed rules of Criminal Procedure. Tomljanovich served on the Lake Elmo Planning Commission and on North St. Paul-Maplewood School Board.

In 1971, she went to work for the Minnesota House of Representatives Research Division with her eye on replacing the retiring Revisor of Statutes. Tomljanovich was appointed Revisor of Statutes by the legislature in 1974 and worked in that capacity until 1977. Governor Rudy Perpich appointed her to the trial court bench for the 10th district on August 30, 1977. Tomljanovich was only the second woman in the state to achieve this position. She was then reelected in 1978 and 1984.

Tomljanovich served as a state district court judge in Washington County from 1977 to 1990, when Governor Rudy Perpich appointed her to the Minnesota Supreme Court. Tomljanovich served on the Minnesota Supreme Court until her retirement in 1998. She joined the Medica Board of Directors in 2002 and retired in 2020.

== Personal life and death ==
Tomljanovich married her husband, Bill Tomljanovich, in 1957. She lived ever since in Lake Elmo, Minnesota, with her husband and family. On May 13, 2025, her husband died at the age of 98.

Esther Tomljanovich died from complications of heart failure in Lake Elmo on July 26, 2026, at the age of 94.
