= University of Minnesota Duluth =

Public university in Duluth, Minnesota, U.S.

- Former names: Duluth Normal School (1902–1921); Duluth State Teachers College (1921–1947)
- Motto: Real Connections
- Type: Public university
- Established: 1947
- Parent institution: University of Minnesota system
- Academic affiliations: Sea-grant
- Endowment: $283 million (2022)
- Budget: $279 million (FY 2023)
- Chancellor: Charles Nies
- Faculty: 577 (fall 2022)
- Students: 9,529 (fall 2025)
- Undergraduates: 7,367 (fall 2025)
- Postgraduates: 820 (fall 2025)
- Other students: 1,342 (fall 2025)
- Location: Duluth, Minnesota, U.S.
- Campus: Urban, 244 acres (99 ha)
- Colors: Maroon and gold
- Nickname: Bulldogs
- Sporting affiliations: NCAA Division II – NSIC; D-I – NCHC, WCHA (ice hockey)
- Mascot: Champ the Bulldog
- Website: d.umn.edu

The University of Minnesota Duluth (UMD) is a public university in Duluth, Minnesota, United States. It is part of the University of Minnesota System. UMD offers 17 bachelor's degrees in 87 majors, graduate programs in 24 different fields, a four-year program at the School of Medicine, and a four-year College of Pharmacy program.

== History ==
=== Early history and plans for Duluth Normal School ===
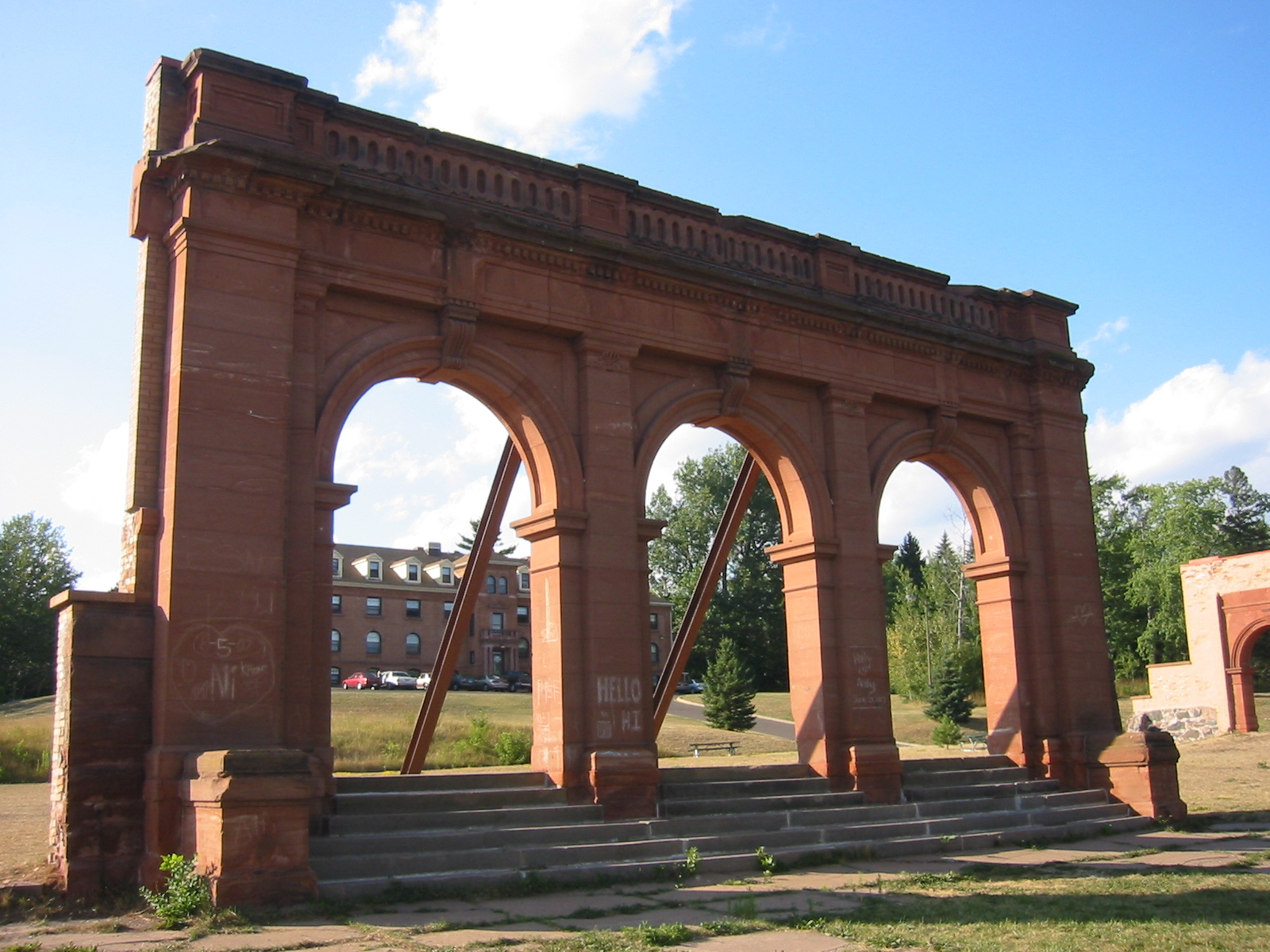
The preserved facade of the Duluth Normal School. Three extant buildings of this campus are now part of the University of Minnesota Duluth

Although the University of Minnesota Duluth did not officially make its appearance until 1947, plans for a college in the Duluth area were first made in the 1890s. The state legislature planned for a teaching school for women (then referred to as a normal school) and in 1895 they passed a bill authorizing the "State Normal School at Duluth".

In 1896, the City of Duluth donated 6 acres (2.4 ha) of land to serve as a foundation for the school, and the state legislature provided additional funds for the construction costs for the main building in 1899, which was built in 1900.

In February 1901, a fire caused extensive damage to the school and the following year, the school was rebuilt.

=== Opening of Duluth State Teachers College ===
In April 1901, Eugene W. Bohannon was appointed president of the Duluth Normal School. In 1902 the school first opened for enrollment. The first students, all women, came to the school to be trained for a degree in education. By 1903, the first seven women received their diplomas from the State Normal School at Duluth. The institution changed names to the Duluth State Normal School or Duluth Normal School in 1905. In 1906, the first dormitories were opened, costing the school around $35,000 to build. Room and board were offered at cost, between fourteen and fifteen dollars a month. Throughout the next few years, more dormitories, two new wings, and an auditorium were added to the school. Requirements, such as having a high school diploma, were instituted. Students who signed a pledge to teach after graduation attended for free; others were required to pay $30 per year.

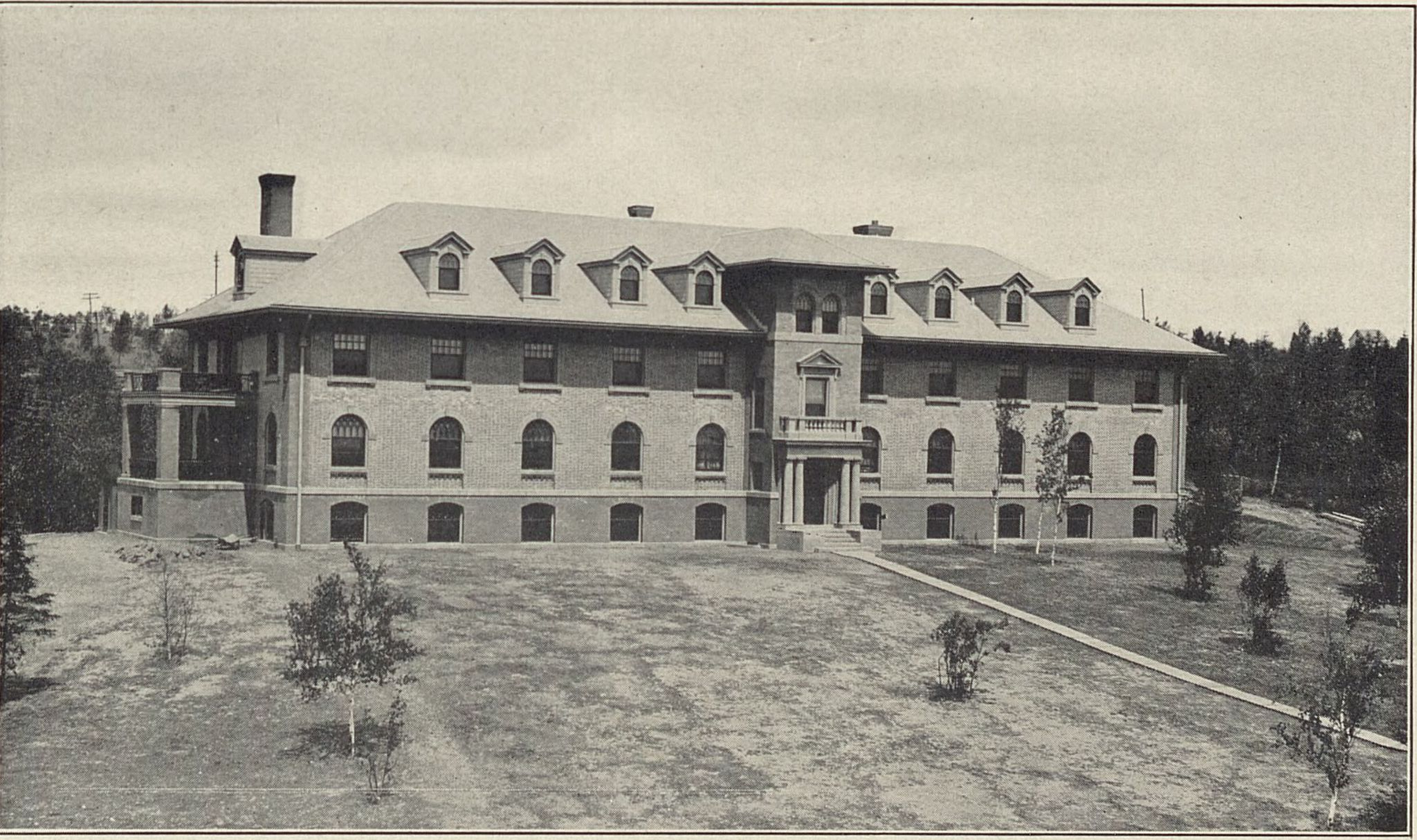
Torrance Hall, August 1910.

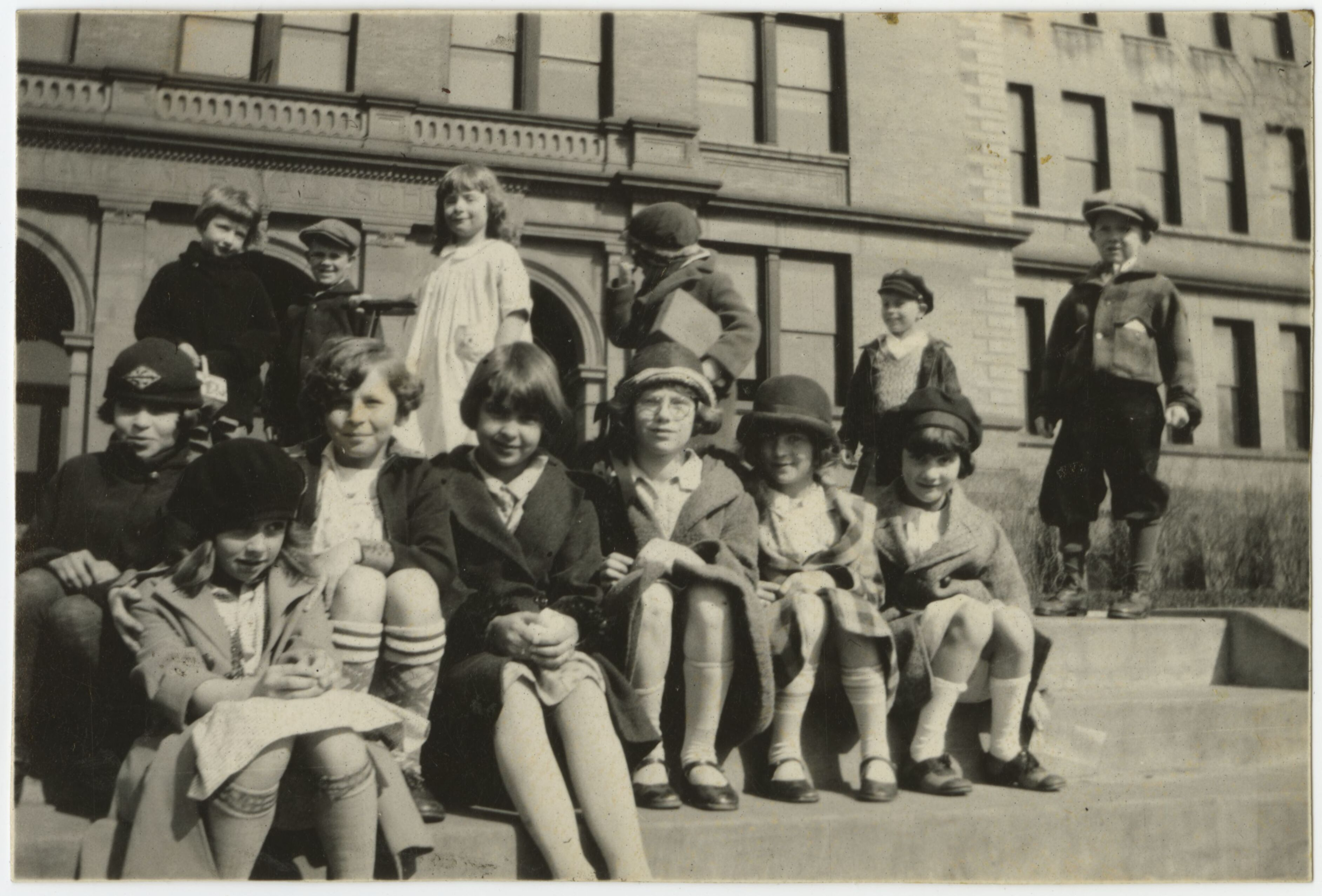
Students taught at the Duluth Normal School model elementary school, c. 1920

The 1906 Bulletin of the State Normal School describes the school at that time as "thoroughly modern in construction and equipment." Enrollment for 1903 was 127 and by 1906 it had increased to 202. A Model School with kindergarten through grade eight was maintained for "practice teaching". Many of the normal school graduates would be the sole instructor in rural areas with one-room schools for children through the eighth grade. The 1906 Bulletin lists the subjects the students were expected to complete in the two-year course:

School Bionomy, Social Science, Psychology and Pedagogy, History and Civics, Physics, Chemistry, Algebra, Geometry, Zoology, Biology, Geography, Domestic Science, Music, English, Latin, Drawing, Manual Training, and others. The subjects were very detailed, for example English included Reviews in Grammar, Rhetoric, Theme Writing, Literary Interpretation, English Composition, Cicero, Caesar, and other subjects. Manual training included simple basketry with the suggestion that the baskets that the children were taught to make could be used as sewing baskets in the sewing classes of Home Economics training. Weaving was taught using simple looms that the children had been taught to make. The use of both hand and electric carpentry tools was taught with the children completing a simple wooden project.

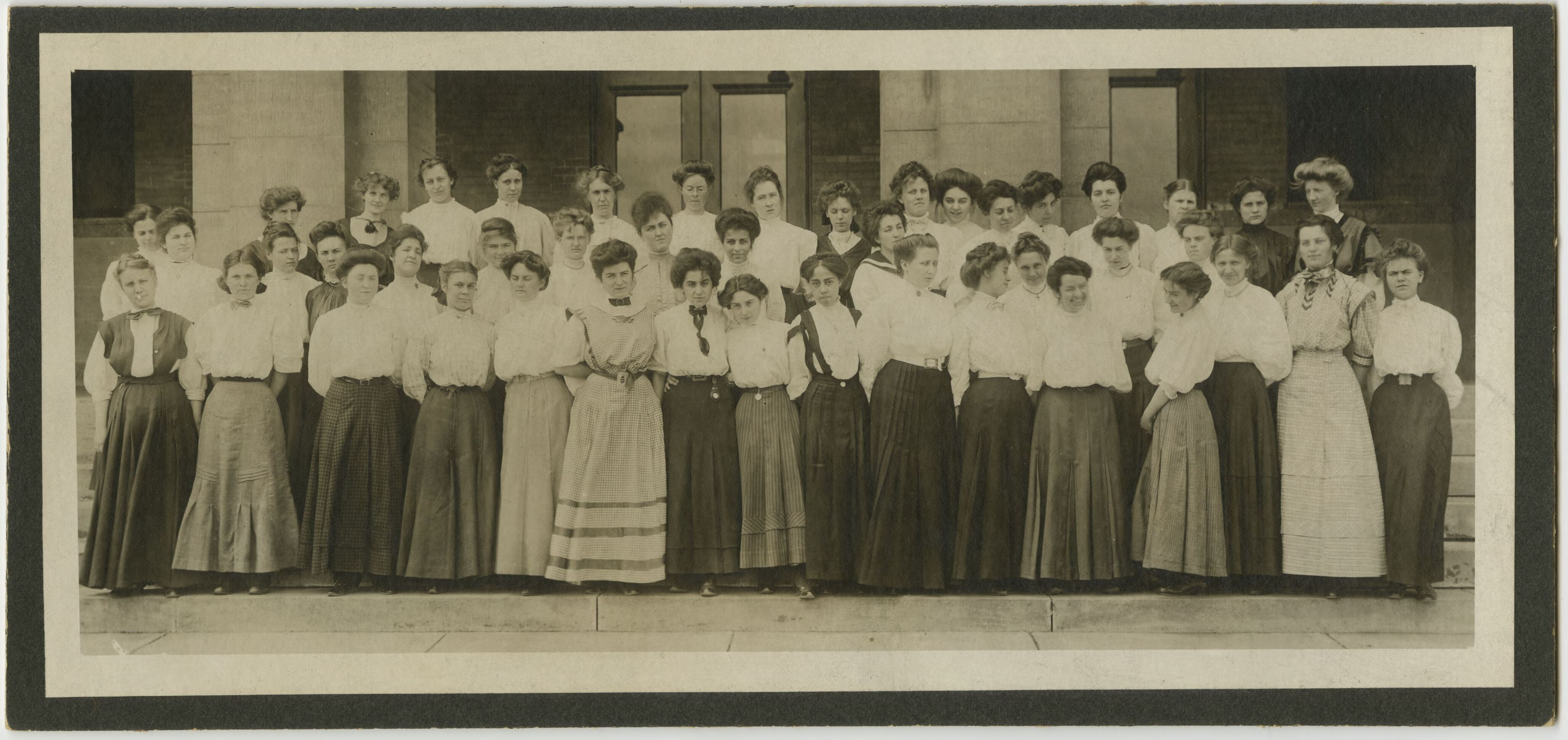
Women students of Duluth Normal School, c. 1920

In 1921, the State Normal School at Duluth was renamed "Duluth State Teachers College" or DSTC. The change in status allowed bachelor's degrees and four-year degree programs to be added to the school. The college published a yearbook, The Chronicle, and looking through the publication the many pages devoted to extracurricular events and student's photos of campus life suggests that the students enjoyed many activities outside of their everyday classroom work. The 1926–1927 Chronicle features a photo of the Spring 1927 graduates. The school was celebrating its 25th year anniversary and the yearbook lists 102 graduates. The class photo is taken with the women sitting on the steps of the Main Building; at present the steps and a small portion of the facade are the only portion of the building left standing following a fire in 1993.

In 1929 the school became co-ed, and the first sports teams were instituted, including hockey, football, and basketball. By 1937, the community supported elevating DSTC to a branch campus of the University of Minnesota.

In 1985 the four surviving buildings of the State Normal School at Duluth, consisting of the Main Building, Washburn Hall, Torrance Hall, and the Model School, were listed on the National Register of Historic Places. The "Duluth State Normal School Historic District" was listed for its state-level significance in the themes of architecture and education. It was nominated as Minnesota's most intact state normal school campus, and for the Beaux-Arts architecture of the Main Building. However a fire in 1993 reduced the Main Building to freestanding remnants.

=== Founding of University of Minnesota Duluth ===
As enrollment increased on the University of Minnesota campus in the Twin Cities in the 1940s, higher education leaders began to debate how to address overcrowding on the state's land grant university campus. During this time City leaders and area state legislators formed a plan to advocate for establishing a branch campus of the University of Minnesota in the City of Duluth. After significant lobbying efforts a bill was drafted and submitted to the legislature that would instead take the Duluth State Teachers College, remove it from the Minnesota State Teachers College system and establish a branch of the University of Minnesota in 1947. The Legislature narrowly passed the bill and the marriage of the University of Minnesota to Duluth State Teachers College began. It is at this time that the University of Minnesota Duluth was established.

These events were significant statewide as the Duluth State Teachers College was given preference above all of the other state teachers college in 6 other regions of the state to be upgraded to "university" status. These events later led to discord, with Southern Minnesota organizing to request its own university in 1963-1967 as part of efforts to make Mankato State Teachers College into a research university called the University of Southern Minnesota or Minnesota State University. It wouldn't be until 1975-1976 that the others would be allowed to develop comprehensive curriculum and expand as full universities. During these initial years the University of Minnesota Duluth was considered directly a part of the University of Minnesota, not an independent institution.

=== Modern history ===
The University of Minnesota Duluth has established itself in a number of research areas including ocean, sea and freshwater sciences. It is the primary sea-grant university for the state of Minnesota and operates the Minnesota Sea Grant Program offices on campus. In addition, in 1972 a two-year school of medicine was founded at the university to provide the first two years of medical education in a small urban and rural setting. The medical school was reorganized in 2000 to be a direct component of the University of Minnesota Medical School from the Twin Cities campus and now operates semi-independently from the University of Minnesota Duluth.

Today, the University now educates around 9,500 students each year. The University colors are maroon and gold which are the same colors of one of the two public high schools in the city of Duluth.

== Campus ==
The UMD campus consists of more than 50 buildings on 244 acres (99 ha) overlooking Lake Superior. All UMD buildings are connected by concourses or hallways and is one of the only universities in the United States with this type of design. UMD is also home to the Tweed Museum of Art, the Marshall W. Alworth Planetarium, Weber Music Hall, and the Marshall Performing Arts Center. Other UMD facilities include Glensheen Historic Estate, Chester Park School which houses Minnesota Sea Grant and the Speech-Language-Hearing Clinic, the Natural Resources Research Institute, the Research and Field Studies Center, and the Lower Campus which houses the Large Lakes Observatory.

UMD has substantially expanded its facilities beginning in 2000 with the completion of the Kathryn A. Martin library. Additional recent buildings include the Weber Music Hall (2002), Kirby Plaza (2004), James I. Swenson Science Building (2005), Sports and Health Center addition (2006), Life Science Renovation (2006), Labovitz School of Business & Economics (2008), Bagley Environmental Classroom (2009), the Civil Engineering Building (2010), and the Heikkila Chemistry and Advanced Materials Science (HCAMS) building (2019).

New art on campus came along with the construction of the new buildings. All new public building projects in Minnesota must comply with the state's “One Percent for Art” law, passed by the State Legislature in 1984, which mandates that all such projects in Minnesota costing over $500,000 must devote at least 1% of their total construction budget towards incorporating public art into these building's public spaces. A little over 1% of the library's $28 million construction costs went toward the purchase and installation of a glass sculpture by Dale Chihuly that hangs from the ceiling of the two-story library lobby. An 89-foot (27 m) outdoor sculpture adjacent to the Swenson Science Building makes reference to elements of Duluth's surrounding Native American Ojibwe culture. The sculpture, "Wild Ricing Moon," was designed by John David Mooney and represents the traditional wild rice harvest.

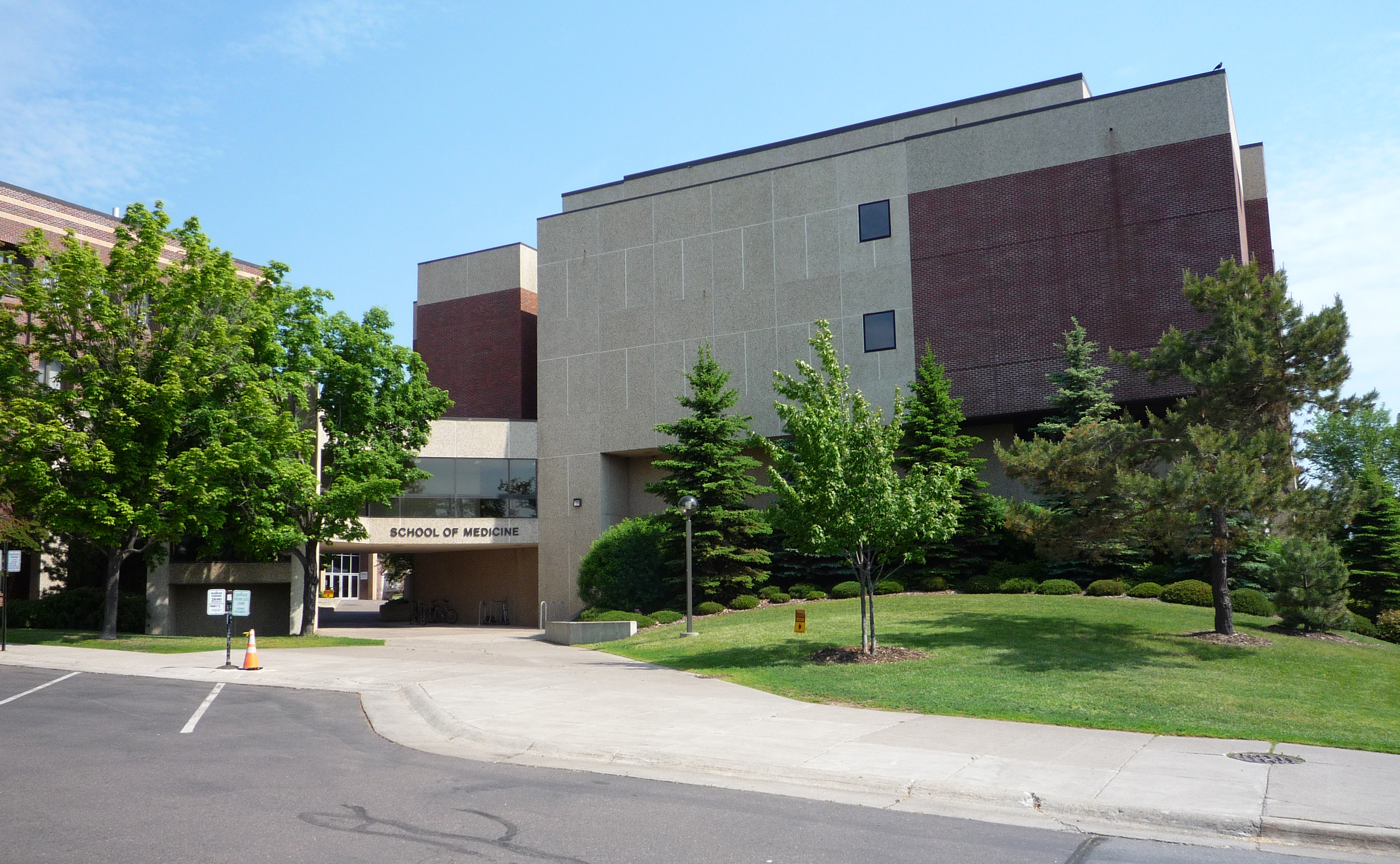
School of Medicine

The colleges and schools at the University of Minnesota Duluth are:

- College of Education & Human Service Professions
- College of Arts, Humanities, & Social Sciences
- Labovitz School of Business and Economics
- Swenson College of Science and Engineering
- Graduate School
- Medical School
- College of Pharmacy

=== Buildings ===
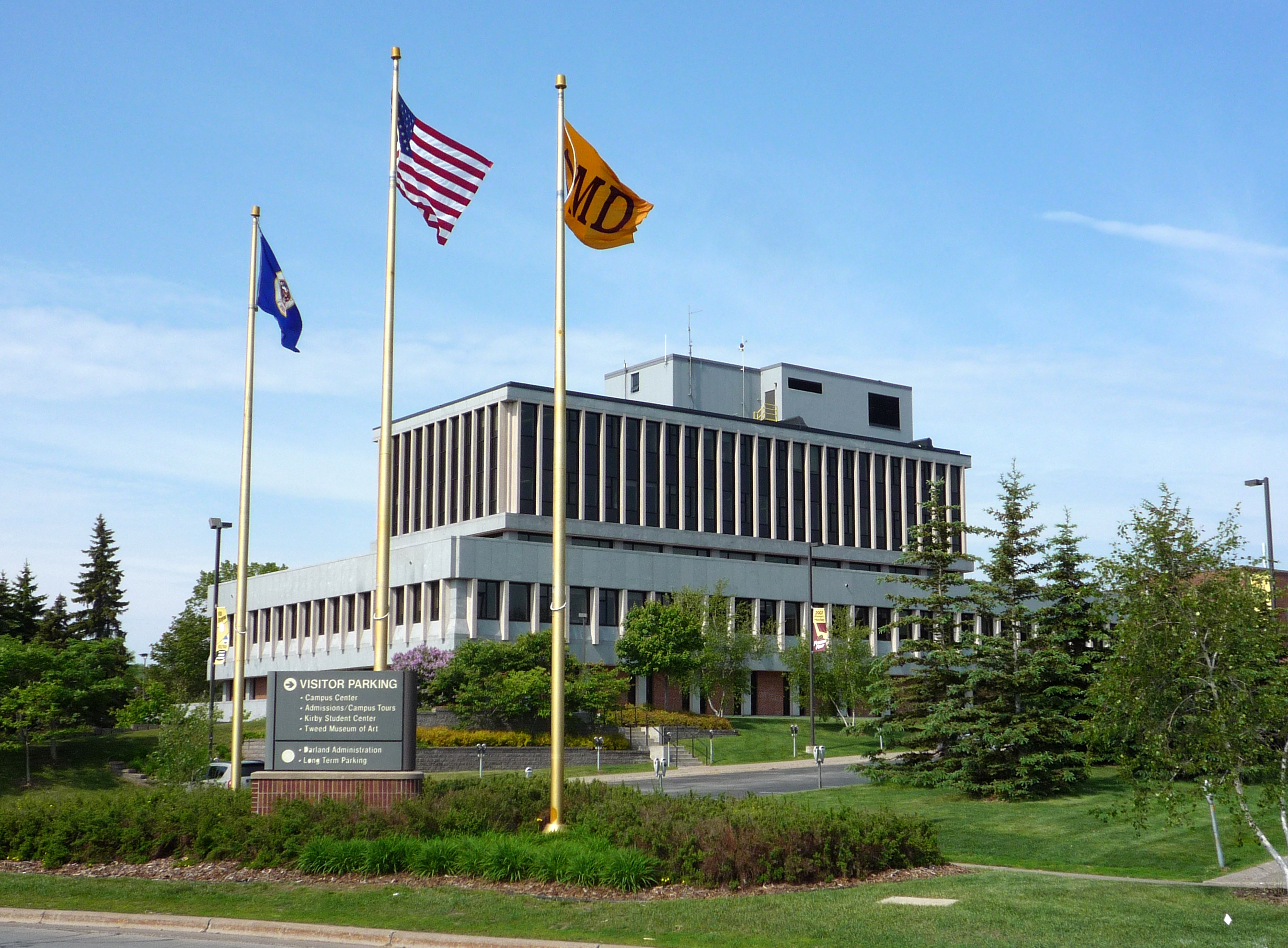
Darland Administration Building

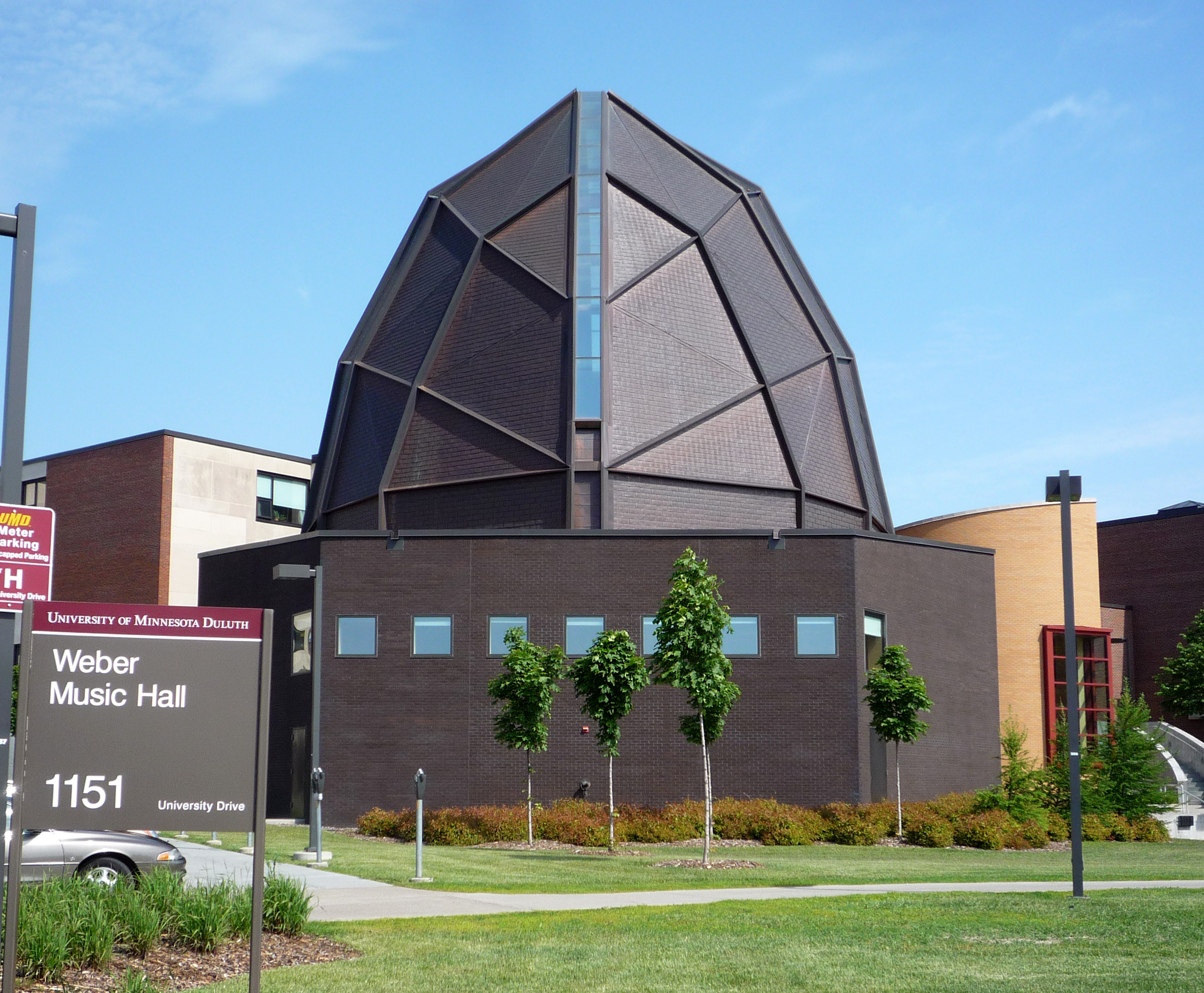
Weber Music Hall

==== Heikkila Chemistry and Advanced Materials Science Building ====
The three-story, 56,000 sq. ft. Heikkila Chemistry and Advanced Materials Science (HCAMS) building opened in 2019. It is named for benefactors Kurt and Beth Heikkila. The HCAMS building is the home of the Advanced Materials Center.

==== James I Swenson Civil Engineering Building ====
Completed in 2010, the 35,300 square foot, $12,100,000 building was designed by Ross Barney Architects of Chicago, Illinois. The new building for the Civil Engineering program is designed to teach students about materials, how they go together, how they age, and how they express the forces inherent in any structure. The exterior expresses the traits of a place where students design, construct, and test structures to withstand stresses and strains. The facade is distinguished by cor-ten steel, precast and poured in place concrete, concrete block, and scuppers clad in reclaimed wood. On a rainy day, the building is a demonstration of hydraulics and kinetic energy, as water pours from the scuppers and splashes into the cor-ten steel catch basins. The design has received many accolades, including the 2013 American Institute of Architects Cote Top Ten Green Project Award.

The jury stated "This is an example of wedding together buildings that perform well but also are aesthetically rich, and culturally useful, beneficial, and beautiful in their own way. The project has a very honest expression of the materials—it's very clear what this building is made of. It's creative in its architectural expression in a way that's sculptural and sort of bold and solid like the sciences that are studied within. Seventy-seven percent energy reduction below the baseline in Duluth’s severe climate also is impressive."

==== Marshall Performing Arts Center ====
Marshall Performing Arts Center was built in the 1970s and is a 715-seat flexible thrust/proscenium theatre presenting an array of theatre and dance events. It was named after the parents of Julia and Caroline Marshall and Jessica Marshall Spencer (Albert and Julia N. Marshall) who were donors to the university. The Dudley Experimental Theatre (a black-box theatre within MPAC) was named for another donor, Marjorie Congdon Dudley.

==== Marshall W. Alworth Planetarium ====
The construction of the Marshall W. Alworth Planetarium was supported by Marshall W. Alworth. Alworth grew up in Duluth and attended Duluth Central High School and later Dartmouth College. He also donated funds towards scholarships which today are valued at over $35 million.

The Marshall W. Alworth Planetarium has a 30 ft (9.1 m) dome, which seats 65. Astronomical programs are delivered with an optomechanical Spitz A3P star machine, a full-dome digital projection system running UniView® software, surround sound, and programmable LRGB LED lighting. The planetarium is home to the Darling telescope, a 9-inch refracting telescope that belonged to John H. Darling.

==== Swenson Science Building ====
Completed in 2006, the building is situated on the main corridor into the 244-acre campus and contains 108,000 gross square feet of inter disciplinary research and teaching laboratories for Chemistry, Fresh Water Ecology and Biology and creates a link between the academic and residential areas of the campus. Designed by Ross Barney Architects of Chicago, Illinois, the new building provides 16 undergraduate instructional laboratories for 2100 students, 16 research laboratories for faculty and postdoctoral researchers, offices for faculty, graduate and postgraduate students, and the Biology departments administration. One unique feature is the wild rice research laboratory built into the watershed creating a front yard and an outdoor learning space.

The outdoor area of the Swenson Science Building was designed by landscape architecture firm oslund.and.assoc. with the concept of "Science on Display", playing upon the idea that seeing is the ideal way to understand scientific concepts. The landscape features an experimental stormwater wetland garden, outdoor classrooms, experimental garden pool, and outdoor laboratories. The native plantings pay homage to the native peoples of Minnesota, with the water garden showcasing the cultivation of wild rice, a cultural staple of some of the Native Americans of the area. In 2007, this landscape won a 2007 ASLA General Design Honor Award.

==== Tweed Museum of Art ====
The Tweed Museum of Art's history began in the 1920s when George and Alice Tweed first began collecting pieces of 19th and 20th American and European art including examples of the French Barbizon School and Impressionist influenced American Landscape painting. After the death of Mr. Tweed in 1946, Mrs. Tweed saw the potential of the Tweed collection as a resource for the community. She generously developed the funding for the present building which was dedicated in 1958.

Today the museum holds over 10,000 works of art. The collection features artists including David Ericson, Gilbert Munger, Eastman Johnson, William Hart, John Twachtman, Homer Dodge Martin, and Childe Hassam. The Hudson River Valley School collection, the Potlatch Company Royal Canadian Mounted Police painting collection, the Glenn C. Nelson pottery collection and an extensive American Indian artifacts and artworks collection are especially noteworthy. Besides the museum's permanent collection the Tweed hosts exhibitions that feature both international and local artists.

==== Weber Music Hall ====
The Weber Music Hall, built in 2002 and designed by architect César Pelli, is considered the "gem" of UMD. The hall has state-of-the-art acoustics and can seat 350 people.

== Centers, institutes, and research labs ==
UMD is home to several research centers and institutes. Below is a list of some of the University's most well-known or most unique organizations.

- Bureau of Business and Economic Research (BBER): an applied research unit within the Labovitz School of Business and Economics
- Center for Regional & Tribal Child Welfare Studies: a program within the College of Education and Human Service Professions that focuses on improving the American Indian child welfare system and knowledge of ICWA.
- Natural Resources Research Institute:
- Great Lakes Maritime Research Institute (GLMRI):
- Large Lakes Observatory (LLO):
- Minnesota Sea Grant Program:
- Natural Resources Research Institute:
- The Northland Advanced Transportation Systems Research Laboratory:
- Royal D. Alworth Institute for International Studies:
- MMAD Lab & Viz Lab:

== Academics ==
Academic rankings

Master's
- Washington Monthly: 192

Regional
- U.S. News & World Report: 45

National
- Forbes: 472

The University of Minnesota Duluth has 17 bachelor's degree programs with 89 majors and 76 minors and graduate programs in 24 fields.

== Athletics ==
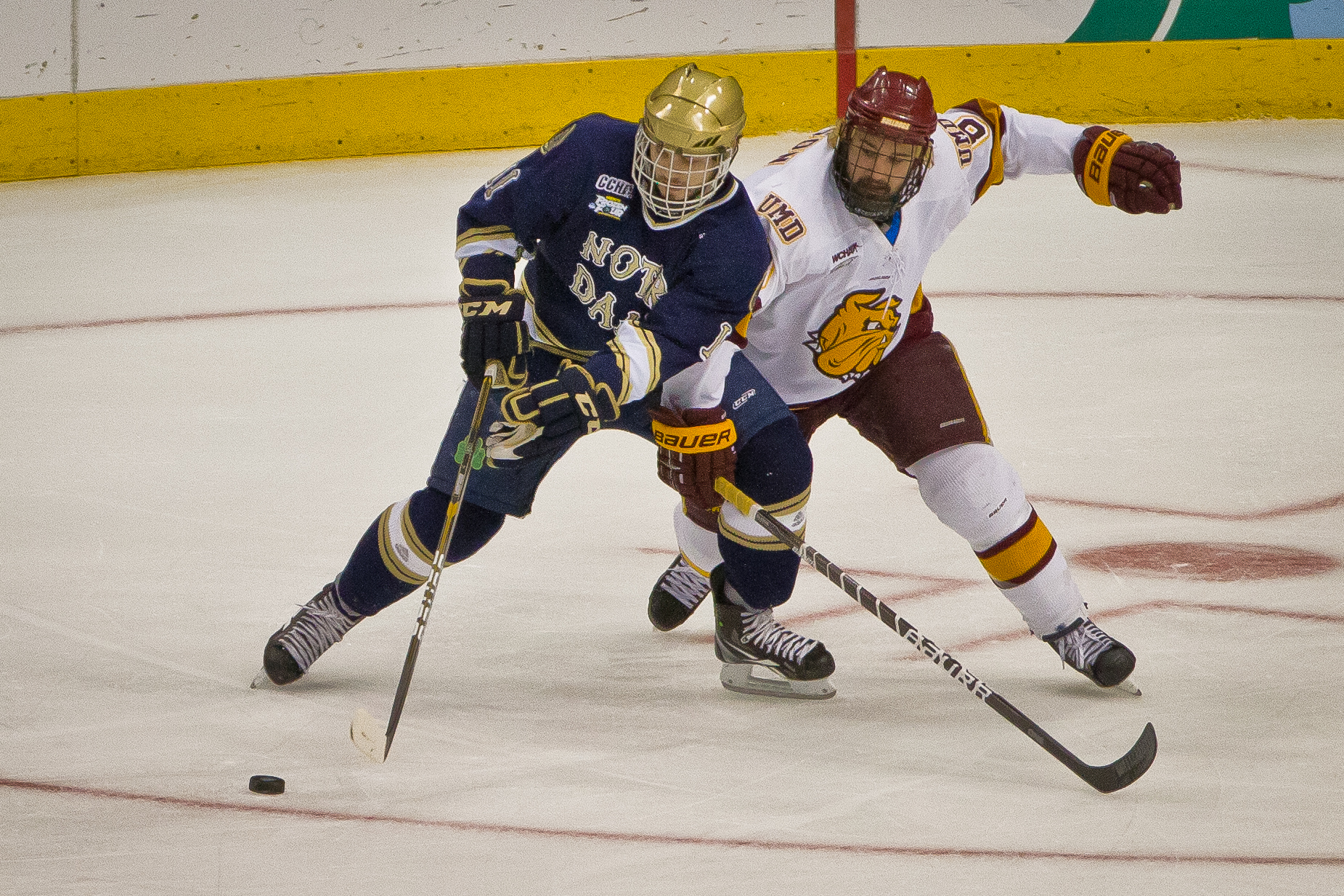
A Bulldogs men's ice hockey player competes with a Notre Dame player during the 2011 Frozen Four.

Minnesota–Duluth (UMD) athletic teams are the Bulldogs (which they have been named since 1933). Their colors are maroon and gold. The university is a member of the Division II level of the National Collegiate Athletic Association (NCAA), primarily competing in the Northern Sun Intercollegiate Conference (NSIC) in all sports except ice hockey since the 2008–09 academic year; which they were a member on two previous stint from 1932–33 to 1950–51, and from 1975–76 to 2003–04. For their ice hockey programs, men's ice hockey competes in the National Collegiate Hockey Conference (NCHC), while women's ice hockey still competes in the Western Collegiate Hockey Association (WCHA; which the men's team previously competed in). The Bulldogs previously competed in the D-II North Central Conference (NCC) from 2004–05 to 2007–08; and in the Minnesota Intercollegiate Athletic Conference (MIAC) at the NCAA Division III ranks from 1951–52 to 1974–75.

Minnesota–Duluth competes in 16 intercollegiate varsity sports: Men's sports include baseball, basketball, cross country, football, ice hockey, and indoor and outdoor track & field; while women's sports include basketball, cross country, ice hockey, soccer, softball, tennis, indoor and outdoor track & field, and volleyball.

=== Accomplishments ===
In 2008, the undefeated Bulldogs won the NCAA Division II National Football Championship—the first Division II championship in any sport at the school. In 2010, the Bulldogs won their second NCAA Division II National Football Championship in a 3-year span and their second in school history beating Delta State University.

In 2011, the Minnesota Duluth Bulldogs men's ice hockey team defeated the University of Michigan 3–2 in overtime for the NCAA Division I men's hockey national title, their first. In 2018, after the Bulldogs were the last team to receive an at-large bid in the tournament, the Minnesota Duluth Bulldogs men's ice hockey team defeated Notre Dame 2-1 for their second NCAA Division I men's hockey national championship. The team won its second consecutive championship (and third overall) the following year.

The Minnesota Duluth Bulldogs women's ice hockey team has won five NCAA Division I national titles: 2001, 2002, 2003, 2008, and 2010.

=== Facilities ===
UMD's Football, Soccer and Track and Field teams compete at Griggs Field in James S. Malosky Stadium. Hockey is played off campus at Amsoil Arena in the DECC. Basketball and Volleyball teams play in Romano Gymnasium on campus. Baseball is played in Bulldog Park and softball is played in Junction Avenue Field

== Student life ==
Undergraduate demographics as of Fall 2023
Race and ethnicity	Total
White	84%
Hispanic	4%
Two or more races	4%
Asian	3%
Black	2%
American Indian/Alaska Native	1%
International student	1%
Unknown	1%
Economic diversity
Low-income (Note: The percentage of students who received an income-based federal Pell grant intended for low-income students.)	21%
Affluent (Note: The percentage of students who are a part of the American middle class at the bare minimum.)	79%

=== Fraternities and sororities ===
There are several fraternities and sororities that UMD students can join.

=== Recreational Sports Outdoor Program (RSOP) ===
Intramural Sports
Soccer, Softball, Volleyball, Flag Football, Ultimate Frisbee, Bowling, Inner Tube Water Polo, Broomball, Hockey (4 on 4), Basketball (Co-Rec., 3 on 3), Curling, Volleyball (4 on 4)

UMD Sport Clubs
There are many UMD organized sports clubs that both men and women may join. Some of the clubs include: Alpine Skiing, Cycling, Badminton, Dance Team, Cheer Team, Figure Skating, Nordic Skiing, NS Climbing, Kayak & Canoe, Water Polo, and Wrestling. Men's Sport Clubs include: Lacrosse, Hockey, Rugby, Soccer, Ultimate Frisbee, and Volleyball. Women's Sport Clubs include: Lacrosse, Hockey, Rugby, Soccer, Ultimate Frisbee, and Volleyball.

Outdoor Programs
Examples of past trips include: Paddling the Boundary Waters Canoe Area Wilderness, Climbing the Devil’s Tower National Monument in Wyoming, backpacking the Porcupine Mountains in Michigan. Events and races on campus in UMD's Bagley Nature Area have included the Rock Hill Adventure where participants run, canoe or kayak and the Homecoming 5K Trail Run.

Fitness
There are a variety of group fitness programs at UMD. These programs are open to students, faculty, staff, and community members. Fitness passes grant entry to classes including; Butts & Gutts, Cardio Mix, Circuit City, Hip Hop, Kardio Kick, Pilates, Piloga, Pump & Tone, Power Yoga, Spin & Core, Step, Step & Sculpt, Vinyasa Yoga, and Yoga Inspired Stretch. Massage therapy, personal training, tri teams, and kinesis are also available at UMD.

== Notable donations ==
=== Joel Labovitz ===
Joel Labovitz is founder of Labovitz Enterprises, a diversified investment firm based in Duluth with a focus on the hospitality industry. Previously, Joel Labovitz was president and CEO of Maurices, the retail clothing company that was founded in 1931 in Duluth by his father, Maurice Labovitz.

=== James Swenson ===
James Swenson, a University of Minnesota Duluth Alumnus, donated more than $21 million to the school, with his most recent donation of $10.7 million toward the College of Science and Engineering. $3 million of this was dedicated to the new civil engineering building and the remaining $7.7 million was given as scholarships for students in science and research programs. This donation helps to continue to support the scholarship programs the Swenson family started in 1994. Since the program began, UMD has awarded scholarships to over 200 students. Because of his generous donations over the years, the school renamed the College of Science and Engineering to be the Swenson College of Science and Engineering. "It's nice to have our names on buildings, but there's a lot of gratification in helping these young people," said Swenson. The Swensons are natives of Superior, Wisconsin, and have since relocated to California. James completed his bachelor's degree in chemistry in 1959 at UMD. He then worked in the computer industry with his circuit shop, Details Inc., which he sold in 1997. James died in October 2018.
