= Anthony J. Perpich =

American dentist and politician

Anthony J. "A. J." Perpich
- Born: February 10, 1932; Carson Lake, Minnesota, U.S.
- Died: January 28, 2017 (aged 84); Shoreview, Minnesota, U.S.
- Education: D.D.S. from Marquette University
- Occupations: Dentist, Politician
- Known for: Service in the Minnesota Senate and State Departments

Anthony J. "A. J." Perpich (February 10, 1932 – January 28, 2017) was an American dentist and politician.

Born in Carson Lake, Minnesota, Perpich graduated from Hibbing High School in 1949. He served in the United States Air Force. In 1951, Perpich graduated from Hibbing Community College. Then in 1955, Perpich received his degree in dentistry from Marquette University. He was a dentist in Eveleth, Minnesota. From 1967 to 1976, Perpich served in the Minnesota Senate and was a Democrat. He also served as a commissioner in the Minnesota Department of Energy and Economic Development and in the Minnesota Department of Public Service. His brothers George F. Perpich and Rudy Perpich also served in the Minnesota Senate. His brother Joseph Perpich is married to Cathy Sulzberger, daughter of Arthur Ochs Sulzberger. Perpich died at his home in Shoreview, Minnesota.
