= Erwin Marquit =

American physicist

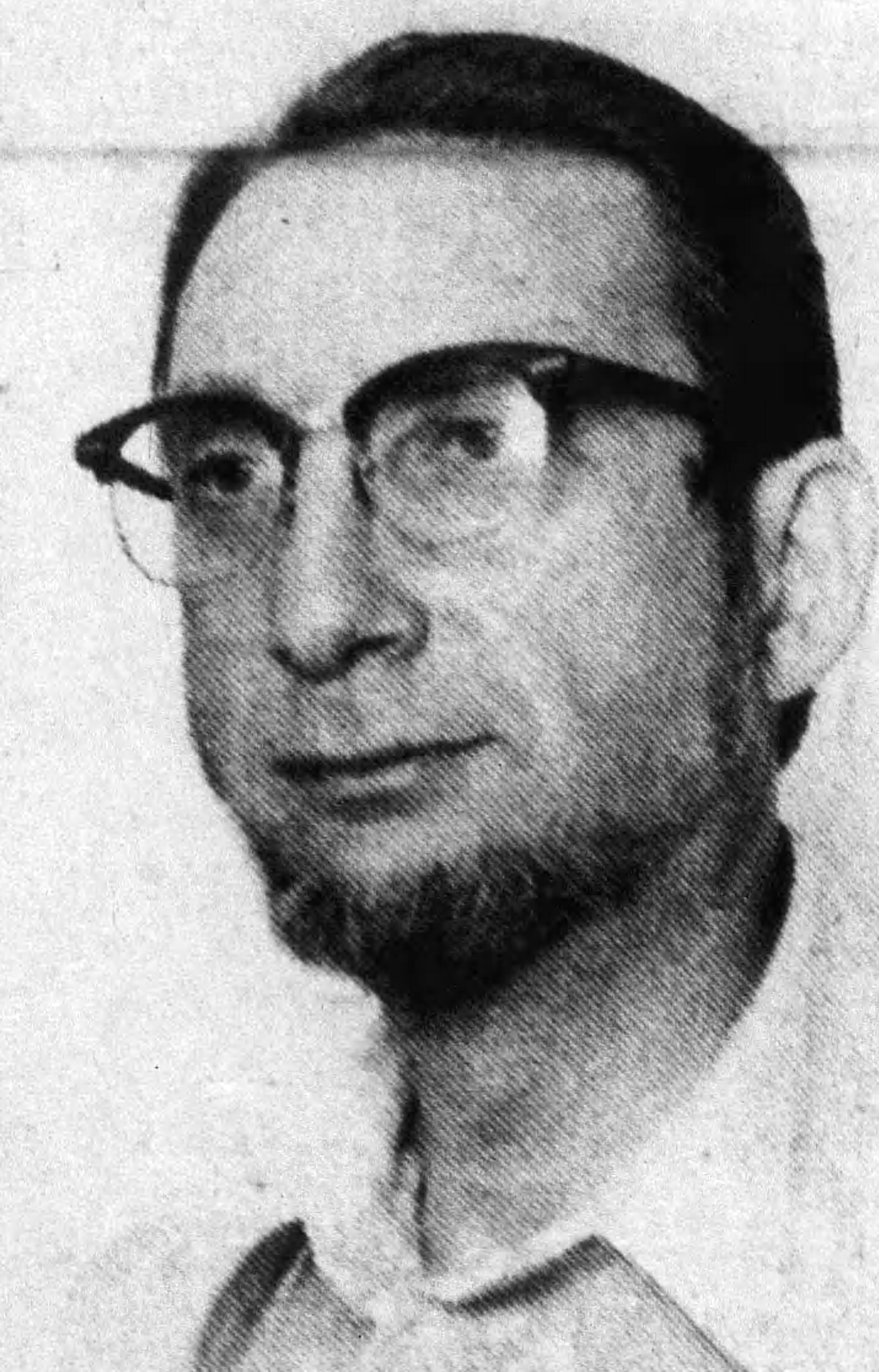
- Marquit c. 1974
- Born: August 21, 1926; New York City, U.S.
- Died: February 19, 2015 (aged 88); Minneapolis, Minnesota, U.S.
- Education: City College of New York; University of Warsaw
- Employer: University of Minnesota
- Known for: Physics, Marxist Educational Press
- Political party: Communist Party USA
- Spouse: Doris Greiser
- Children: Carl
- Website: imid.ltd/index-1.html

Erwin Marquit (August 21, 1926 – February 19, 2015) was an American physicist and Marxist philosopher. He was the principal founder of the Marxist Education Press and was editor of the Marxist studies journal Nature, Society, and Thought (1987–2007), making available works of Marxist scholarship, including contributions from European, African, Chinese, Vietnamese, and Cuban scholars.

== Career ==
Erwin Marquit was born in 1926 in New York City. In 1931, his family moved to the United Workers Cooperative Colony in the East Bronx.

Marquit studied electrical engineering at the College of the City of New York (1942-48—interrupted by 22 months in the United States Navy (1944–46). He was blacklisted as an engineer and barred from completing a master's degree dissertation in physics at New York University in 1950 due to his Communist Party affiliation and he emigrated to Poland. He returned to the United States in 1963 upon completing the degree of Doctor of Mathematical and Physical Sciences at the University of Warsaw. After a research appointment at the University of Michigan (1963–65) in particle physics and an assistant professorship at the University of Colorado (1965–66), he was appointed Associate Professor of Physics at the University of Minnesota in 1966.

In 1974, he was the Communist Party candidate for Governor of Minnesota, coming in sixth with 3,570 votes. That same year, he changed his research interests from experimental particle physics to application of dialectical materialism to the study of the conceptual foundations of physics. Also that year, he initiated a course entitled Introduction to Marxism, while continuing to teach courses in physics.

The combination of a nationwide campaign against a Communist Party member teaching a course on Marxism and the change in the direction of his research from government- funded research to unfunded research with a Marxist orientation, led to an eight-year effort by the University of Minnesota administration to force his removal from the university despite his having tenure. With support from colleagues in the United States and abroad, he was able to defend his position and win promotion in 1983, but with the unusual title Professor without Disciplinary Designation. In 1994, Marquit was finally awarded the title Professor of Physics after the Encyclopedia of Applied Physics commissioned him to write a 13-page entry on Philosophy of Technology. He was awarded the title Professor Emeritus of Physics in 1999.

In the Communist Party, Marquit strongly opposed what he saw as undemocratic and Stalinist tendencies by its leader Gus Hall. In 1992, Marquit briefly led the Minnesota chapter of the Committees of Correspondence for Democracy and Socialism. The chapter dissolved after a few months because of conflict caused by the chapter's Marxist orientation. Marquit later reconciled with the party and as a member of its Economics Commission, initiated discussions on the socialist market economies in China and Vietnam. He died at the age of 88 in 2015.

== Writings ==
Marquit continued his association with the Marxist Educational Press until its dissolution in 2011, and contributed articles to Political Affairs and People's World on past and present problems of socialist political and economic development in light of economic globalization. A selection of his papers on dialectical materialism and philosophy of the natural sciences can be found on his website.
