= Ivan Prpić =

Ivan Prpić may refer to:

- Ivan Prpić (soldier) (1887–1967), infantry general of the Croatian Home Guard
- Ivan Prpić (physician) (1927–2019), Croatian physician
