= Robert W. Johnson (Minnesota politician) =

American politician

Robert W. Johnson (May 4, 1924 – March 20, 2013) was an American politician, lawyer, and tax accountant.

Born in Saint Paul, Minnesota, Johnson served in the United States Navy during World War II. Johnson received his bachelor and law degrees from the University of Minnesota. He practiced law and was a tax accountant. He served in the Minnesota House of Representatives as a Republican.

He died in Fountain Hills, Arizona.
