= Al Quie =

American politician (1923–2023)

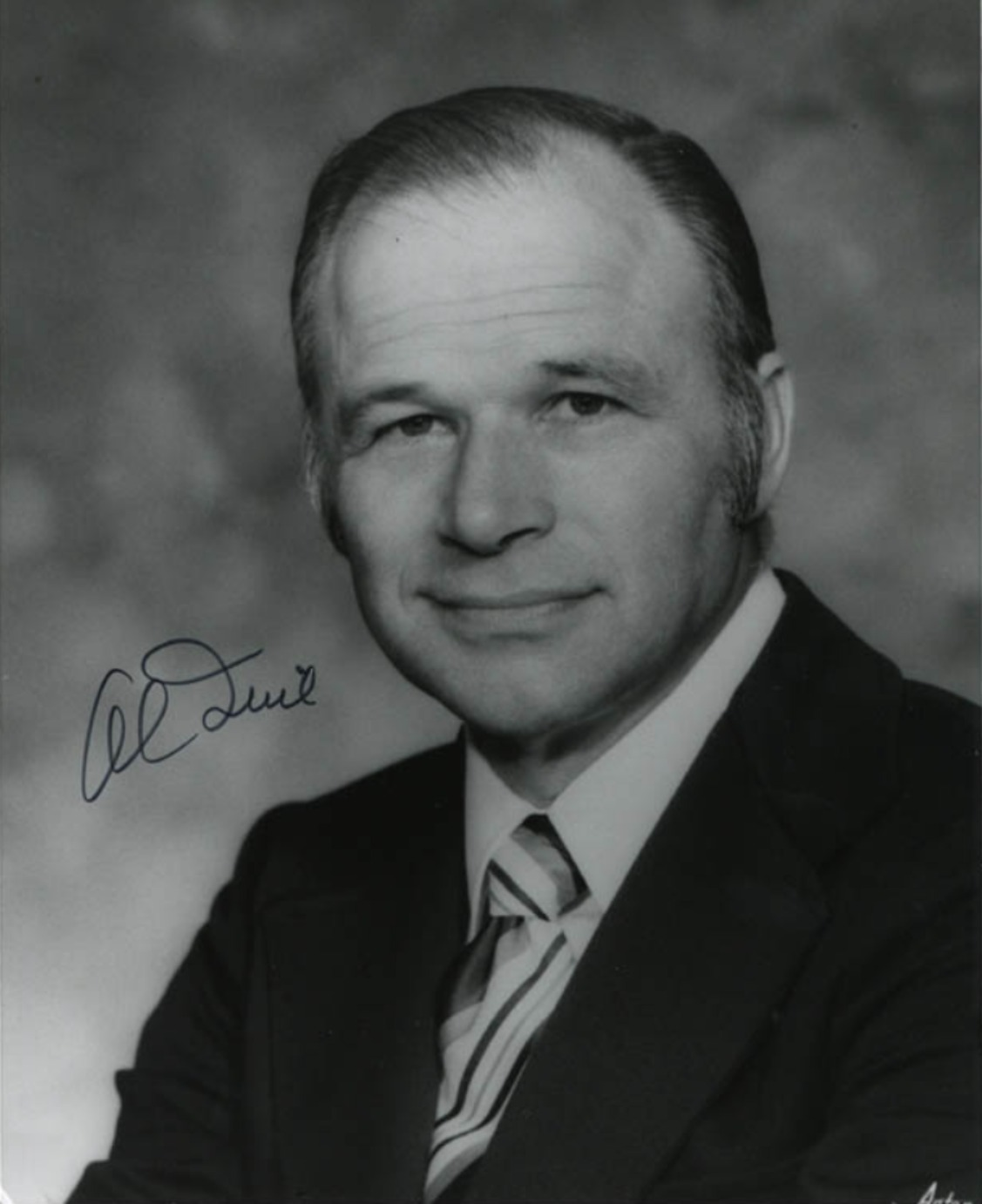
- Congressional portrait, 1977

35th Governor of Minnesota
- In office January 4, 1979 – January 3, 1983
- Lieutenant: Lou Wangberg
- Preceded by: Rudy Perpich
- Succeeded by: Rudy Perpich

Member of the U.S. House of Representatives from Minnesota's 1st district
- In office February 18, 1958 – January 3, 1979
- Preceded by: August H. Andresen
- Succeeded by: Arlen Erdahl

Member of the Minnesota Senate from the 18th district
- In office January 3, 1955 – January 3, 1958
- Preceded by: Homer Covert
- Succeeded by: Arnin Sundet

Personal details
- Born: Albert Harold Quie; September 18, 1923 Wheeling Township, Minnesota, U.S.
- Died: August 18, 2023 (aged 99) Wayzata, Minnesota, U.S.
- Resting place: Valley Grove Cemetery
- Party: Republican
- Spouse: Gretchen Quie (m. 1948; died 2015)
- Children: 5
- Education: St. Olaf College (BA)

Military service
- Branch/service: United States Navy
- Years of service: 1943–1945
- Unit: Naval Air Force Atlantic
- Battles/wars: World War II
- Awards: World War II Victory Medal

Albert Harold Quie (/kwiː/ KWEE; September 18, 1923 – August 18, 2023) was an American politician and farmer from Minnesota. Quie served as a member of the United States House of Representatives representing Minnesota's 1st congressional district from 1958 to 1979 and as the 35th governor of Minnesota from 1979 to 1983.

Regarded as a moderate Republican, Quie was considered by Ronald Reagan for his choice of a running mate for the office of Vice President of the United States during the 1980 presidential election. He was also on Gerald Ford's list for possible vice presidents following the resignation of Richard Nixon in 1974.

== Early life ==
The third of four children, Quie was born on September 18, 1923, on his family's farm in Wheeling Township, Rice County, Minnesota near Dennison, Minnesota, in Rice County, Minnesota. Three of his grandparents were Norwegian immigrants. The farm on which he was born and grew up on had been purchased by his grandfather upon returning to Minnesota from fighting in the American Civil War. A third-generation farmer, Quie grew up on the farm learning to ride horses and milk cows.

Quie graduated from Northfield High School in Northfield, Minnesota, in 1942. He served in the United States Navy during World War II as a fighter pilot, finishing flight school just as the war ended. Quie never saw active combat. Following his military service, he graduated from St. Olaf College in 1950, with a degree in political science. It was during this time that he met his future wife Gretchen Hansen.

== State and national government service ==
Like his great-grandfather, grandfather, and father before him, Quie became a dairy farmer. A Republican, Quie ran a campaign as a write-in candidate to the Minnesota House of Representatives in 1952, but lost. He served in the Minnesota State Senate from 1955 to 1958, representing the old 18th District.

=== Congress ===
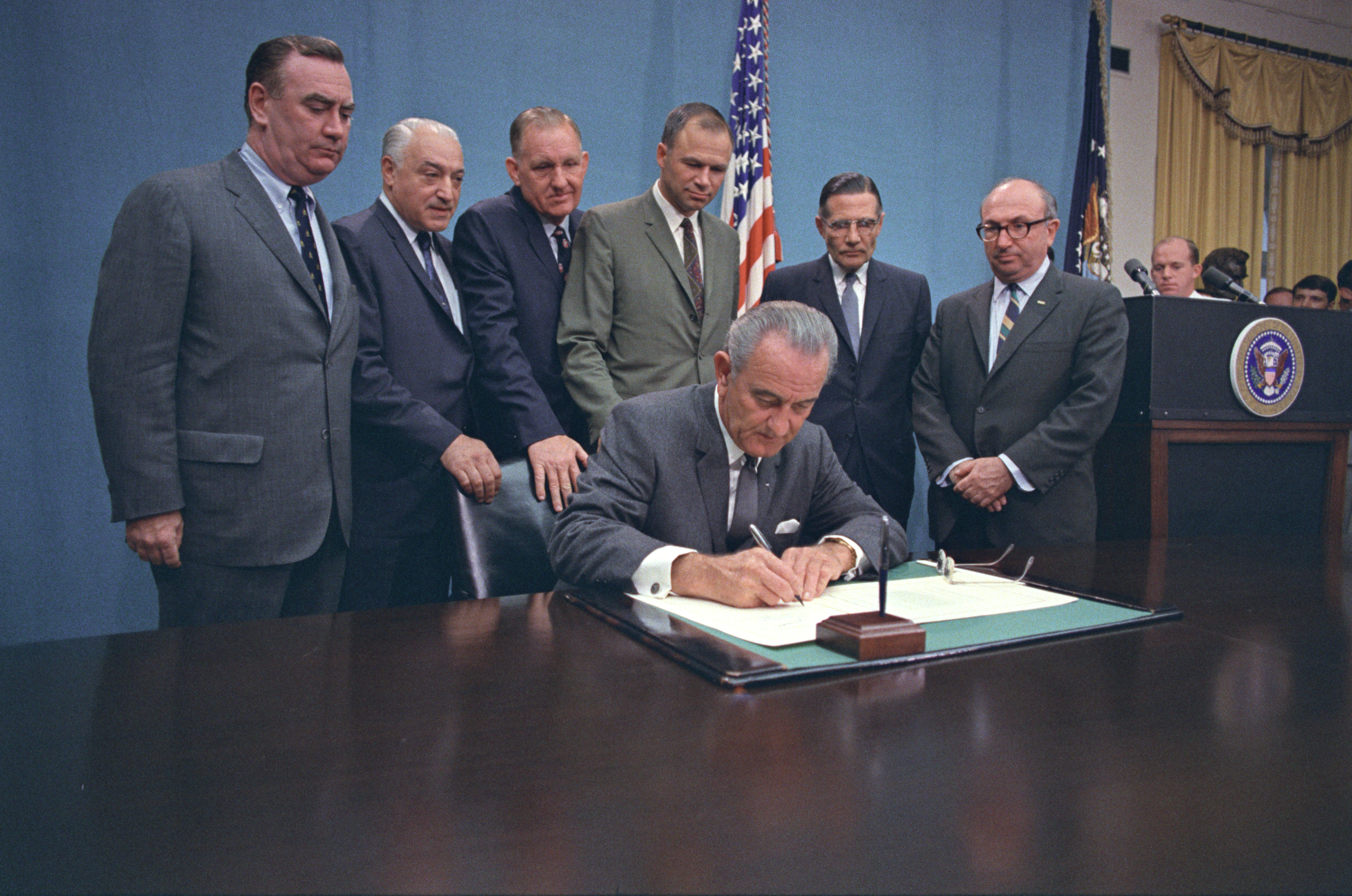
Quie and other members of Congress attend the signing of the Handicapped Children's Early Education Assistance Act on September 30, 1968, by President Lyndon B. Johnson

United States House of Representatives member August H. Andresen died in January 1958 and Quie ran in the by-election to succeed him as the representative for Minnesota's 1st congressional district. Quie won the Republican nomination at a party convention and then defeated Minnesota Democratic–Farmer–Labor Party nominee Eugene Foley by 655 votes in the February special election. He defeated Foley in the November 1958 general election to win a full term. Quie was a member of the U.S. House of Representatives in the 85th United States Congress up to the 95th United States Congress. He served on the United States House Committee on Agriculture and the United States House Committee on Education and Workforce.

Quie voted in favor of the Civil Rights Acts of 1960, the Civil Rights Act of 1964, and the Civil Rights Act of 1968, as well as the Twenty-fourth Amendment to the U.S. Constitution and the Voting Rights Act of 1965.

Quie was briefly considered for Vice President of the United States in 1974 after Gerald Ford became president upon the resignation of Richard Nixon. The position was eventually taken by Nelson Rockefeller.

=== Governor of Minnesota ===
Quie ran for governor of Minnesota in 1978 against incumbent Rudy Perpich, Quie won the election by 111,775 votes. During his term, he grappled with a budget crisis. Cash-flow problems soon overtook the state government. The old surplus turned into a deficit, estimated at between $600 million and $700 million. A strike by state employees that year symbolized Minnesota’s newfound economic woes. The state had not previously run a deficit since World War II.

In November 1979, five foreign students were arrested for allegedly plotting to kidnap Quie, they were later released due to a lack of evidence.

In 1982, Quie signed the Minnesota Acid Deposition Control Act, the first acid rain regulation in the United States.

Minnesota’s fiscal troubles gave James Florio, a Democratic politician running for governor in New Jersey, ammunition for attacking supply-side economics, the theory, then growing in popularity among Republicans, which holds that cutting taxes, spending and regulations fosters economic growth. After having promised not to raise taxes, Quie was finally forced to do so, “causing much of his political support to evaporate.” He did not run for re-election in 1982.

== Later years ==
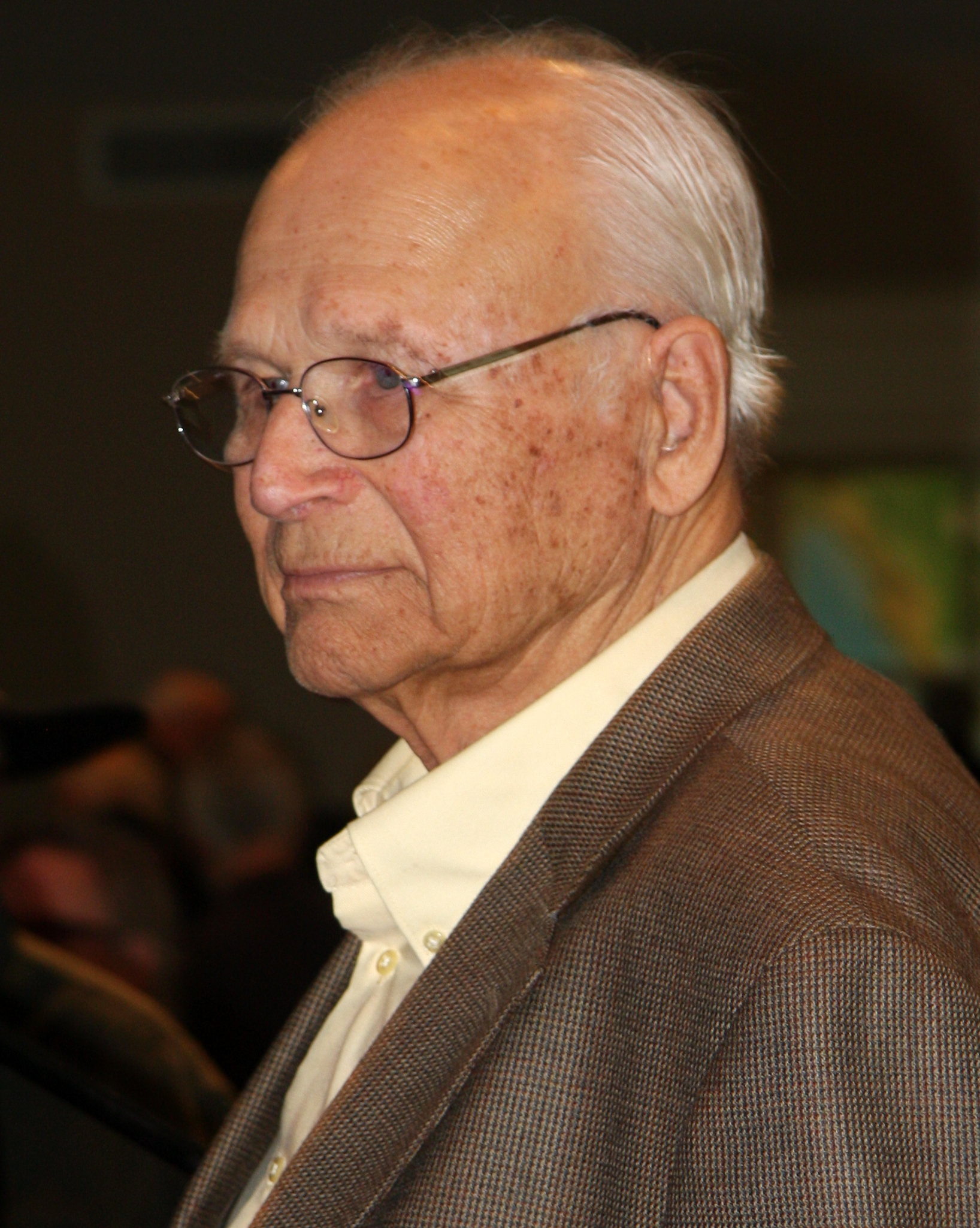
Quie in 2014

After leaving politics, Quie became involved with a nonprofit prison ministry. He sold the family farm and traveled extensively, including horseback riding excursions.

== Personal life and death ==
Quie's grandfather joined the newly founded Republican Party and supported Abraham Lincoln for president in the 1860 United States presidential election.

Quie was a devout Lutheran. He married artist Gretchen Quie, who was born Gretchen Hansen, whom he met at St. Olaf, on June 5, 1948. She died of Parkinson's disease on December 13, 2015, at age 88.

Quie lived in a senior living community in Wayzata, Minnesota for the last decade of his life. Although his health had been declining for months into 2023, he was reportedly healthy in his last few days. He died from natural causes on August 18, 2023 in Wayzata at the age of 99, one month before his 100th birthday.

At the time of his death, he was both the oldest living former American governor and the oldest living former U.S. representative. Quie lay in state in the Rotunda of the Minnesota State Capitol on Saturday, September 9, and was buried at Valley Grove Cemetery in Nerstrand, Minnesota later that day, next to his late wife Gretchen.

== In popular culture ==
In Garrison Keillor's Lake Wobegon Days, Quie is said to be the first governor ever to set foot in the mythical town of Lake Wobegon, "slipping quietly away from his duties to attend a ceremony dedicating a plaque attached to the Statue of the Unknown Norwegian" and making a few remarks.

== Electoral history ==
District	Incumbent			This race		Notes
District	Year	Member	Party	Results	Candidates	Notes
Minnesota 1	1958 Special Election	August H. Andresen	Republican	Incumbent died January 14, 1958. New member elected February 18, 1958. Republican hold.	✓ Al Quie (Republican) 50.3%; Eugene P. Foley (Democratic) 49.7%	
Minnesota 1	1958	Al Quie	Republican	Incumbent re-elected.	✓ Al Quie (Republican) 56.9%; Eugene P. Foley (Democratic) 43.1%	
Minnesota 1	1960	Al Quie	Republican	Incumbent re-elected.	✓ Al Quie (Republican) 60.5%; George Shepherd (DFL) 39.5%	
Minnesota 1	1962	Al Quie	Republican	Incumbent re-elected.	✓ Al Quie (Republican) 57.5%; George Shepherd (DFL) 42.5%	
Minnesota 1	1964	Al Quie	Republican	Incumbent re-elected.	✓ Al Quie (Republican) 55.3%; George Daley (Democratic–Farmer–Labor) 44.7%	
Minnesota 1	1966	Al Quie	Republican	Incumbent re-elected.	✓ Al Quie (Republican) 65.9%; George Daley (DFL) 34.1%	
Minnesota 1	1968	Al Quie	Republican	Incumbent re-elected.	✓ Al Quie (Republican) 68.7%; George Daley (DFL) 31.3%	
Minnesota 1	1970	Al Quie	Republican	Incumbent re-elected.	✓ Al Quie (Republican) 69.3%; B. A. Lundeen (Democratic (DFL)) 30.7%	
Minnesota 1	1972	Al Quie	Republican	Incumbent re-elected.	✓ Al Quie (Republican) 70.7%; Charles S. Thompson (Democratic (DFL)) 29.3%	
Minnesota 1	1974	Al Quie	Republican	Incumbent re-elected.	✓ Al Quie (Republican) 62.6%; Ulric Scott (Democratic (DFL)) 37.4%	
Minnesota 1	1976	Al Quie	Republican	Incumbent re-elected.	✓ Al Quie (Republican) 68.2%; Robert C. Olson Jr. (DFL) 30.5%; Lloyd Duwe (American) 1.3%	

1978 gubernatorial election
Party	Candidate	Votes	%	±%
Ind.-Republican	Al Quie	830,019	52.35%	+22.99%
Democratic (DFL)	Rudy Perpich (incumbent)	718,244	45.30%	−17.51%
American	Richard Pedersen	21,058	1.33%	n/a
Socialist Workers	Jill Lakowske	6,287	0.40%	−0.34%
Honest Government 87	Tom McDonald	4,254	0.27%	n/a
Libertarian	Robin E. Miller	3,689	0.23%	+0.06%
Savings Account	Edwin Pommerening	2,043	0.13%	n/a
Majority		111,775	7.05%	
Turnout		1,585,594		
Ind.-Republican gain from Democratic (DFL)		Swing		

U.S. House of Representatives
Preceded by August Andresen	Member of the U.S. House of Representatives from Minnesota's 1st congressional district 1958–1979	Succeeded by Arlen Erdahl
Preceded by William Hanes Ayres	Ranking Member of the House Education and Labor Committee; 1971–1977	Succeeded by Charles W. Whalen Jr.
Party political offices
Preceded by Everett Dirksen; Gerald Ford	Response to the State of the Union address 1968; Served alongside: Howard Baker, George H. W. Bush, Peter Dominick, Gerald Ford, Robert Griffin, Thomas Kuchel, Mel Laird, Bob Mathias, George Murphy, Dick Poff, Chuck Percy, Charlotte Reid, Hugh Scott, Bill Steiger, John Tower	Vacant Title next held by Donald Fraser, Scoop Jackson, Mike Mansfield, John McCormack, Patsy Mink, Ed Muskie, Bill Proxmire
Preceded by John Johnson	Republican nominee for Governor of Minnesota; 1978	Succeeded by Wheelock Whitney
Political offices
Preceded by Rudy Perpich	Governor of Minnesota; 1979–1983	Succeeded by Rudy Perpich
Honorary titles
Preceded by John M. Patterson	Oldest Living American Governor; 2021–2023	Succeeded by Jimmy Carter
Preceded by Bob Dole	Oldest Living United States Representative; Sitting or Former; 2021–2023	Succeeded by Frank J. Guarini
