= George F. Perpich =

American dentist and politician

Personal details
- Born: September 2, 1933 Carson Lake, Minnesota, U.S. (now Hibbing, Minnesota, U.S.)
- Died: September 26, 2018 (aged 85) Arden Hills, Minnesota, U.S.
- Spouse: Constance "Connie" Perpich (m. 1980)
- Children: 2
- Relatives: Rudy Perpich (brother); Anthony J. Perpich (brother)
- Occupation: Dentist and politician

George F. Perpich (September 2, 1933 – September 26, 2018) was an American dentist and politician.

Born in Carson Lake, Minnesota, Perpich graduated from Hibbing High School in 1951 and from University of Minnesota Duluth in 1955. He served in the United States Navy from 1955 to 1957. In 1961, Perpich received his degree in dentistry from University of Minnesota. He was a dentist in Chisholm, Minnesota. From 1971 to 1980, Perpich served in the Minnesota State Senate and was a Democrat. His brothers Anthony "Tony" J. Perpich and Rudy Perpich also served in the Minnesota Senate. Rudy served as governor of Minnesota from 1976 to 1978 and from 1983 to 1990. His brother Joseph Perpich is married to Cathy Sulzberger, daughter of Arthur Ochs Sulzberger. Perpich died at Johanna Shores Long Term Facility in Arden Hills, Minnesota from Parkinson's disease.
