= Natural Resources Research Institute =

US research organization

Coordinates: 46°50′10″N 92°12′26″W

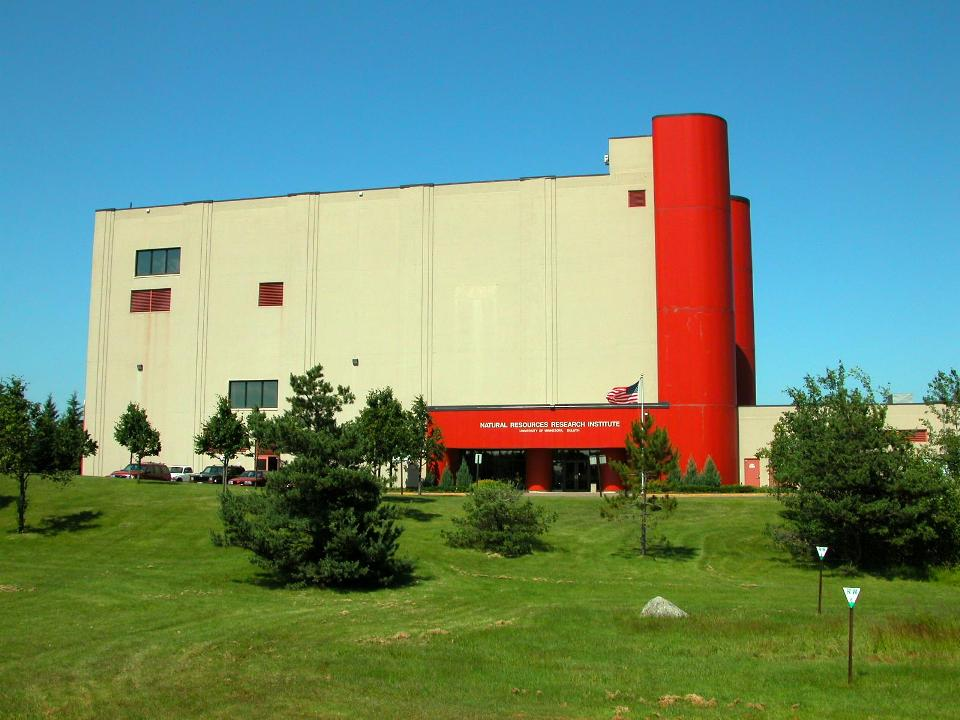
Natural Resources Research Institute, Duluth Minn.

The Natural Resources Research Institute (NRRI) is an applied research organization established in 1983 by the Minnesota Legislature within the University of Minnesota (UMN). The institute conducts research on natural resource utilization, environmental stewardship, and economic development in Minnesota.

NRRI operates primary research facilities in Duluth and Coleraine, Minnesota, working across forestry, mining, water resources, and bioeconomy sectors.

NRRI conducts applied research to inform resource management and industrial technology development. Although not a degree-granting academic department, NRRI employs research scientists and staff, collaborates with University of Minnesota faculty, and provides research assistantships and internships for undergraduate and graduate students.

== History ==
In the late 1970s and early 1980s, the economy of Northeastern Minnesota experienced significant decline due to downturns in the domestic steel and forest product industries. Shipments from the region's taconite plants decreased substantially, leading to job reductions across the Iron Range and surrounding supply networks.

In response to the economic downturn, civic, educational, and government leaders—including Eighth Circuit Court of Appeals Judge Gerald Heaney and Minnesota Governor Rudy Perpich—advocated for the creation of an applied research center focused on regional natural resources such as peat, biomass, minerals, and water.

In 1983, the Board of Regents of the University of Minnesota submitted a formal proposal to the Minnesota State Legislature to establish the institute at the UMD campus, separate from the existing Minerals Resources Research Center. The legislature established NRRI in 1983 (Chapter 258, Laws of Minnesota) with initial appropriations totaling $3.9 million over two fiscal years.

Legislative Charter

"To foster the economic development of Minnesota’s natural resources in an environmentally sound manner to promote private sector employment."

- Minnesota State Legislature, 1983

The institute was initially structured into four main divisions:

- Minerals
- Biomass
- Water
- Energy

Dr. Michael Lalich served as NRRI's inaugural permanent director from 1984 until his retirement in 2013. Dr. Rolf Weberg assumed executive leadership in 2014.

== Restructuring and Operations, 1989–2014 ==
In 1989, NRRI reorganized its original four divisions into three core operating units:

1. Center for Water and the Environment: Focuses on aquatic and terrestrial ecosystem research, environmental management tools, and ecological impact studies.
2. Center for Applied Research and Technology Development: Incorporates the minerals, forest products, and biomass research divisions.
3. UMD Center for Economic Development: A joint initiative between NRRI, the UMD Labovitz School of Business and Economics, and the Swenson College of Science and Engineering.

== Organization and Strategic Initiatives 2014-Present ==
Under Dr. Weberg's leadership NRRI evolved into an integrated research facility. Individual research centers were dismantled and replaced with cross-functional research groups composed of scientists, engineers and technicians.

=== Strategic Focus Areas ===
The institute structures its portfolio around three core strategic initiatives:

- Iron and Minerals of the Future: Focuses on value-added iron and mineral processing, low-grade ore processing, direct reduced iron (DRI) technologies, non-ferrous mineral extraction, and the industrial use of mining byproducts (such as taconite tailings).
- Ecosystem Resilience: Focuses on aquatic and terrestrial ecology, watershed management, forest ecosystem health, wildlife monitoring, biological indicators of water quality, and climate change response models.
- Forest Products and Bioeconomy: Focuses on bio-based materials, wood product manufacturing, silvicultural management, and the conversion of biomass and industrial waste streams into engineered carbon products and bioenergy.

=== Industrial and Regional Programs ===
NRRI leads and participates in several regional and national deployment programs:

- Midwest Industrial Transformation Initiative (MITI): An initiative aimed at supporting decarbonization, climate technology adoption, and modernization in regional manufacturing and heavy industry.
- IMPACT Alliance: A multi-institutional collaboration focused on accelerating the pilot testing and commercial deployment of industrial research applications.

== Decision Support Tools and Applied Projects ==
NRRI develops public datasets, web-based tools, and applied technologies for resource managers, policymakers, and industry partners:

- Minnesota Resource Atlas: A public online geographic mapping and decision-support platform providing multi-layered spatial data on Minnesota's land, water, natural resources, and infrastructure.
- Aquatic and Forest Ecosystem Monitoring: Long-term studies on Great Lakes nearshore habitats, stream biological health, aquatic invasive species risk assessment, and songbird population dynamics to guide forest management practices.
- Materials and Process Development: Applied research into road construction materials derived from taconite rock byproducts, biochar applications, hybrid poplar cultivation, and high-purity iron production methods.

== Facilities and Research Infrastructure ==
NRRI operates specialized research sites and laboratories across Minnesota:

- NRRI Duluth Facility (Duluth, MN): The main administrative and research facility, housing analytical laboratories, geographic information systems (GIS) laboratory, forest product testing, and water resource ecology labs.
- NRRI Coleraine Laboratory (Coleraine, MN): Acquired from the United States Steel Corporation in 1989, this site contains pilot-scale mineral processing and pyrometallurgical facilities. Features include a pilot-scale Direct Reduced Iron (DRI) Simulator, flotation units, and a biomass conversion facility equipped with industrial kilns.
- Fens Research Site (Zim, MN): A 525-acre (212 ha) former drained peatland acquired in 1986, utilized for long-term ecological restoration studies and wetland mitigation crediting.
- Ely Field Station (Ely, MN): Operated from 1999 to 2006 for paleolimnology and water quality research before operations were integrated into the Duluth center.
