= Rudy Perpich =

American politician

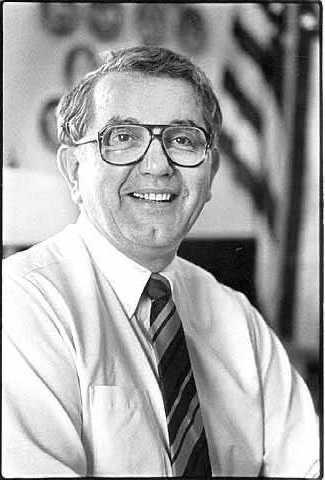
- Perpich in 1985

34th & 36th Governor of Minnesota
- In office January 3, 1983 – January 7, 1991
- Lieutenant: Marlene Johnson
- Preceded by: Al Quie
- Succeeded by: Arne Carlson
- In office December 29, 1976 – January 4, 1979
- Lieutenant: Alec G. Olson
- Preceded by: Wendell R. Anderson
- Succeeded by: Al Quie

39th Lieutenant Governor of Minnesota
- In office January 4, 1971 – December 29, 1976
- Governor: Wendell R. Anderson
- Preceded by: James B. Goetz
- Succeeded by: Alec G. Olson

Member of the Minnesota Senate from the 63rd district
- In office January 8, 1963 – January 4, 1971
- Preceded by: Elmer Peter Peterson
- Succeeded by: George F. Perpich

Personal details
- Born: Rudolph George Prpić; June 27, 1928 Carson Lake, Minnesota, U.S.
- Died: September 21, 1995 (aged 67) Minnetonka, Minnesota, U.S.
- Party: Democratic (DFL)
- Spouse: Delores "Lola" Perpich
- Children: 2
- Education: Hibbing Junior College; Marquette University (DDS)
- Profession: Dentist

Military service
- Allegiance: United States
- Branch/service: United States Army
- Years of service: 1946–1948

Rudolph George Perpich Sr. (born Rudolph George Prpić; June 27, 1928 – September 21, 1995) was an American politician who served as the 34th and 36th governor of Minnesota from 1976 to 1979 and from 1983 to 1991. He was a member of the Democratic-Farmer-Labor Party. To date, he is the only governor elected to serve non-consecutive terms in the history of Minnesota.

Perpich was born to Croatian American parents in Carson Lake, Minnesota, and graduated from Hibbing High School in 1946. He served in the United States Army for two years before attending Marquette University in Milwaukee as an undergraduate and then a dental student. He graduated in 1954 and returned to Hibbing to practice dentistry.

Perpich was elected a state senator in St. Louis County in 1962. He served there until 1970, when he was elected lieutenant governor under Governor Wendell R. Anderson. He was reelected in 1974. In 1976, Perpich was appointed governor of Minnesota after Anderson resigned to fill a seat in the U.S. Senate. In the 1978 gubernatorial election, dubbed the "Minnesota Massacre", Perpich lost reelection. He then traveled to Vienna, Austria, to work for supercomputer company Control Data Corporation. Perpich returned to Minnesota in 1982 to run for governor against the DFL-endorsed candidate Warren Spannaus. Perpich won the election and served until 1991.

As governor, Perpich sought to strengthen Minnesota's international trade opportunities, job markets, and corporations. He nominated the first women justices to the Minnesota Supreme Court and Minnesota Court of Appeals and relied on local support through canvassing. Perpich backed multiple Minnesota institutions as governor, including the Mall of America, Natural Resources Research Institute, Wells Fargo Place, the Center for Victims of Torture, and the Perpich Center for Arts Education. He was criticized for using the Minnesota National Guard to protect Hormel Foods during the 1985–1986 Hormel strike, but refused to send the force to Nicaragua to train with the Contra rebels.

== Early life and education ==
Rudolph George Prpić was born in Carson Lake, Minnesota, which is now part of Hibbing. His father, Anton Prpić, was a miner and union organizer who had immigrated to Minnesota's Mesabi Iron Range from Croatia, and his mother, Mary (Vukelich), was an American of Croatian descent. Perpich's parents were married in an arranged marriage when Mary was 16 years old. Perpich's father was involved in organizing iron miners with the Trade Union Unity League and the Trade Union Educational League and was eventually blacklisted from the industry for it. Perpich did not learn to speak English until at least the first grade of elementary school. At 14, he began working for the Great Northern Railway. He graduated from Hibbing High School in 1946 and served two years in the United States Army. He then attended Marquette University in Milwaukee, Wisconsin and graduated from Marquette University Dental School in 1954, and returned to Hibbing to practice dentistry.

== Entry into politics ==
Perpich first entered politics by serving on the Hibbing school board in 1955–1956. The board gained notability for instituting equal pay for male and female workers. In 1962, he was elected to the Minnesota Senate, representing the old 63rd District, which included portions of Saint Louis County in the northeastern part of the state. In 1964, Perpich came out against the Vietnam War, one of the first elected officials nationwide to do so. He was reelected in 1966.

In 1970, Perpich was elected the 39th lieutenant governor of Minnesota. He was reelected in 1974 on a ticket with Governor Wendell R. Anderson. (Before 1974, the governor and lieutenant governor were elected separately in Minnesota.) In 1972, Perpich endorsed a protest against the Vietnam War.He became governor when Anderson resigned in 1976 to accept appointment to the United States Senate seat vacated by Walter Mondale, who had been elected Vice President of the United States. Perpich was the first Iron Range resident to hold the office. In 1977, he nominated Rosalie Wahl, the first woman to serve on the Minnesota Supreme Court. Lawyers including Esther Tomljanovich, Diana E. Murphy, and Roberta Levy were also considered.

== Gubernatorial campaigns ==
Most of the statewide DFL Party ticket was defeated in 1978, termed the "Minnesota Massacre"; the defeated candidates included Perpich, the candidates for both U.S. Senate seats, and Auditor Robert Mattson. Anderson's arrangement to have himself appointed to the Senate and Perpich's role in that appointment were deemed major factors in those defeats. Perpich's support of gun control and abortion rights may also have contributed to his defeat. Before the 1978 election, Minnesota Citizens Concerned for Life, an anti-abortion group, covered Twin Cities area church parking lots with leaflets saying "Rudy Perpich Is a Baby Killer". According to historian Hy Berman, this series of events caused Perpich to adopt a born again Catholic anti-abortion stance.

Perpich worked at Control Data Corporation in New York and Austria for several years, after CEO Bill Norris recruited him as vice president for international affairs. In 1981, his friends and family, Iron Range politicians like Dougie Johnson, and union leaders including Baldy Cortish and Joe Samargia, began meeting in Chisholm, Minnesota. to plan for his return. Perpich supporters put signs in stores across the state asking "Where is Rudy?", and sent flyers to drum up support for him. Eventually reporters began asking Perpich's supporters about the campaign, and in 1982 Lori Sturdevant of the Minneapolis Star and Tribune interviewed him on his return. In 1982, he ran for governor against the DFL Party's endorsed candidate, Warren Spannaus. Perpich was shunned at the party convention in Duluth, and DFL party activists removed his campaign signs to try to prevent him from winning.

Perpich sought to advance Minnesota's status in international trade, use of natural resources, economic diversification, and alternative energy availability. He introduced executives from St. Jude Medical, Telex Communications, and other Minnesota corporations to companies in former Yugoslavia to support business ties. Perpich opposed tax relief during the early 1980s recession, and advocated for partnership between students and the private sector through the Minnesota Job Skills Partnership. He also advocated for Iron Range mineworkers who were suffering unemployment, and headquartered his campaign in Minnesota's 8th congressional district. The campaign team's main tactic was canvassing; Perpich visited small towns and engaged in public events like polka dances to win support. His first choice for running mate was Joan Growe, who preemptively turned down the offer of running on an unendorsed ticket. Perpich also asked Lori Sturdevant and Emily Anne Staples before choosing businessowner Marlene Johnson, who had strong support in Saint Paul.

Perpich won the 1982 DFL primary by 28,000 votes, thanks in part to support from Rochester and the Iron Range. Attempting to reunite the DFL, he met with Mark Dayton, who later gave a speech in favor of Perpich. He then defeated Independent-Republican nominee Wheelock Whitney, Jr. in the general election. Upon his victory, he became the state's first Roman Catholic governor. As of 2025, he remains the only Catholic elected governor of Minnesota.

In 1983, Perpich appointed Harriet Lansing to be the first female judge on the Minnesota Court of Appeals. He chaired the Midwestern Governors Association in 1984. Perpich is known for having sent the Minnesota National Guard out during the 1985–1986 Hormel strike, to keep the plant open while it hired scabs. The strike occurred because Hormel, despite record profits, insisted on concessions from the unionized workers, including wage reductions, reductions in benefits, and other changes that made life more difficult and more dangerous for meat packers at the Hormel plant in Austin. According to historian Hy Berman, Perpich's father, a former union organizer, called him a strikebreaker. The strike was not authorized by the United Food and Commercial Workers international organization or supported by the local labor movement. After the Hormel strike was broken and over the next four decades the meat industry increasingly consolidated into four companies that dominate the industry in the U.S.: JBS, Tyson, Cargill, and National Beef. Those four have colluded to depress worker wages, depress the price paid to ranchers, and raise the price of meat, especially beef.

Perpich was reelected in 1986, but lost to Arne Carlson in 1990, in a bizarre campaign in which Carlson replaced the Independent-Republican Party nominee Jon Grunseth, who had beaten Carlson in the primary. (After Carlson's surprise primary defeat, a bipartisan, grassroots group, Minnesotans for the WRITE Choice, launched a noisy, media-intensive campaign urging Carlson to re-challenge Grunseth.) Grunseth was forced to withdraw amid allegations of a sex scandal just two weeks before the election. Perpich was Minnesota's last DFL governor until Mark Dayton took office in 2011.

== Colorful behavior and international goals ==
Perpich had a reputation for colorful behavior. At one point while governor, he donated his $25,000 pay raise to help promote bocce. He also pitched an idea for a chopstick factory to be built in northern Minnesota, and proposed selling the governor's mansion in Saint Paul as a cost-saving measure.

Newsweek brought Perpich national attention by bestowing on him the nickname "Governor Goofy", crystallizing the combination of affection and resentment his habits elicited. During his last years in office, commentators wondered whether he would shoot to stardom as a presidential hopeful or, as governor, sour Minnesota voters on the DFL party with questionable public relations. But Perpich's activist vision of the governor's role was later cited as an important contribution to the Minnesota economy, even by such unlikely admirers as his 1990 rival and successor Arne Carlson, who said in 2005 that Perpich "was the first person that I was aware of to focus on the international role that states are going to have to play."

Perpich's legacy of projects in Minnesota include the University of Minnesota Duluth Natural Resources Research Institute, established in 1983; the Center for Victims of Torture, founded in 1985; the Minnesota World Trade Center, opened in 1987; and the Perpich Center for Arts Education, opened in 1989. He worked with James H. Lindau to approve the Mall of America. Perpich was the first governor to promote Minnesota on the international stage by traveling to a record 17 countries in 1984 and bringing Mikhail Gorbachev of the USSR and Franjo Tuđman of Croatia to the state in 1990.

Perpich opposed the Reagan proxy war against Nicaragua in the 1980s and was one of several governors who objected to sending their National Guard units to train in U.S. bases in Honduras, where the U.S.-backed Contras were based. The Contras carried out atrocities in Nicaragua to topple the leftist government there. Perpich was the plaintiff in the 1990 U.S. Supreme Court case Perpich v. Department of Defense, which established that the U.S. Department of Defense could send state National Guard units overseas over the governor's objection.

== Post-political life ==
After leaving office in 1991, Perpich went to Zagreb, Croatia, to assist its post-communist government. In 1992 he moved to Paris, France, for a business consulting position. That year, he was diagnosed with colorectal cancer, and underwent surgery; he never disclosed his illness publicly. He returned to Minnesota in 1993. In 1995, his cancer returned. On September 21, 1995, Perpich died at his home in Minnetonka at the age of 67. He is buried in Lakewood Cemetery in Minneapolis.

Perpich's wife, former Minnesota First Lady Lola Perpich, died on May 6, 2025.

== Personal life ==
Perpich owned a cabin on Esquagama Lake near McKinley, Minnesota.

== See also ==
- Perpich Center for Arts Education
- Saint Louis County Road 4 – Governor Rudy Perpich Memorial Drive

Political offices
Preceded by James B. Goetz	Lieutenant Governor of Minnesota; 1971–1976	Succeeded by Alec G. Olson
Preceded by Wendell R. Anderson	Governor of Minnesota; 1976–1979	Succeeded by Al Quie
Preceded by Al Quie	Governor of Minnesota; 1983–1991	Succeeded by Arne Carlson
Party political offices
Preceded by Bob Short	Democratic nominee for Lieutenant Governor of Minnesota; 1970, 1974	Succeeded by Alec G. Olson
Preceded by Wendell R. Anderson	Endorsed Gubernatorial Candidate, Minnesota DFL State Convention; 1978	Succeeded by Warren Spannaus
Preceded by Wendell R. Anderson	DFL nominee for Governor of Minnesota; 1978, 1982, 1986, 1990	Succeeded by John Marty
Preceded by Warren Spannaus	Endorsed Gubernatorial Candidate, Minnesota DFL State Convention; 1986, 1990	Succeeded by John Marty
