= Major J. Foster =

American businessman and politician

- Ambrotype of Foster c. 1858

Member of the Minnesota House of Representatives from the 14th District
- In office January 5, 1864 – January 2, 1865 Serving with S. A. Hunt and Reuben Whittemore

Member of the Minnesota House of Representatives from the 9th District
- In office December 2, 1857 – December 6, 1859 Serving with Isaac DeCow, Theodore J. Eames, Tollef Fladeland, and James M. Graham

Personal details
- Born: 1823 Ohio, U.S.
- Died: December 12, 1886 (aged 62–63) Forestville, Minnesota, U.S.
- Resting place: Zumbro Hill Cemetery

Major James Foster (1823 – December 12, 1886), also known as M.J. Foster, was an American businessman, politician, and early settler of Fillmore County, Minnesota who served two nonconsecutive terms in the Minnesota House of Representatives.

== Early life and education ==
Foster was born in 1823 in Ohio and was educated in common school.^{:717}

== Career ==
Foster moved to Minnesota Territory in 1854 and settled in Forestville, Minnesota.^{:717} While in Forestville, Foster built the Fremont House hotel with the help of his childhood friend William Meighen, which he opened in 1856.^{:717}^{:334} Foster was the proprietor of the hotel for fifteen years.^{:717}

== Political career ==
Foster was elected on October 13, 1857, to serve in the Minnesota House of Representatives, representing Minnesota's 9th House district (Fillmore County). Foster served during the 1st Minnesota Legislature, during his first term he was the chairman of the Minnesota State Prison committee.

Foster was again elected on November 3, 1863, to serve in the Minnesota House representing Minnesota's 14th House district (Fillmore County). Foster served during the 6th Minnesota Legislature, during his second term Foster was the chairman of the roads and bridges committee and was a member of both the railroads committee and the towns counties committees.

== Later life and death ==
In 1871 Foster moved to a farm in Forestville.^{:717} Foster died on December 12, 1886, in Forestville.^{:717} Foster is buried in Zumbro Hill cemetery, which is now part of the Forestville Mystery Cave State Park.
