= Etna, Minnesota =

Unincorporated community in Minnesota, United States

Etna
- Unincorporated community
- Location within Minnesota Location within the United States
- Coordinates: 43°36′08″N 92°20′49″W
- Country: United States
- State: Minnesota
- County: Fillmore
- Township: Bloomfield Township
- Elevation: 1,283 ft (391 m)
- Time zone: UTC-6 (Central (CST))
  - Summer (DST): UTC-5 (CDT)
- ZIP codes: 55975
- Area code: 507
- GNIS feature ID: 654698

Etna is an unincorporated community in Bloomfield Township, Fillmore County, Minnesota, United States. Etna is located within ZIP code 55975 based in Spring Valley.

== History ==
A post office previously operated within the community of Etna from 1856 to 1901. The community was named for Mount Etna, on Sicily.

== Geography ==
The community is located eight miles southeast of Spring Valley, at the junction of Fillmore County 14 and 153rd Avenue. U.S. Highway 63 is nearby.

Etna Creek and the South Branch Root River both flow through the community.

Nearby places in Minnesota include Spring Valley, Ostrander, Le Roy, Cherry Grove, and Greenleafton. Nearby places in Iowa include Chester and Lime Springs.

Etna is located five miles east of Ostrander; and four miles west of Cherry Grove. Forestville Mystery Cave State Park is also nearby.
