= Cherry Grove, Minnesota =

Unincorporated community in Minnesota, United States

Cherry Grove
- Unincorporated community
- Location within Minnesota Location within the United States
- Coordinates: 43°35′15″N 92°17′20″W
- Country: United States
- State: Minnesota
- County: Fillmore
- Elevation: 1,326 ft (404 m)

Population
  - Total: 100
- Time zone: UTC-6 (Central (CST))
  - Summer (DST): UTC-5 (CDT)
- ZIP codes: 55975 and 55965
- Area code: 507
- GNIS feature ID: 641144

Cherry Grove is an unincorporated community in Fillmore County, Minnesota, United States.

The community is located 9 miles south of Wykoff, at the junction of Fillmore County 5 and 160th Street, near Forestville Mystery Cave State Park. U.S. Highway 63 and Fillmore County 14 are both in the vicinity.

Cherry Grove is located along the boundary line between York Township and Forestville Township.

Nearby places include Spring Valley, Ostrander, Etna, Wykoff, Greenleafton, Preston, and Harmony.

Cherry Grove is located 12 miles southeast of Spring Valley; and 15 miles southwest of Preston. Cherry Grove is 17 miles west-northwest of Harmony.

ZIP codes 55975 (Spring Valley) and 55965 (Preston) meet at Cherry Grove. A post office previously operated in the community of Cherry Grove from 1857 to 1893, and again from 1894 to 1903.

The South Branch Root River is nearby.
