= Thomas Meighen =

Thomas J. Meighen
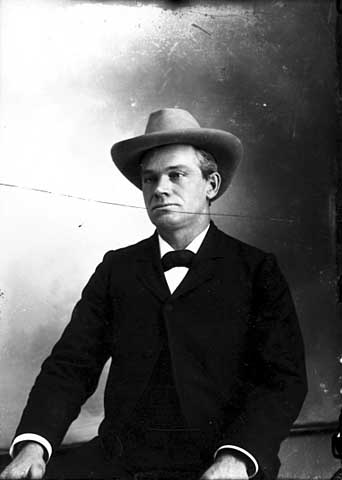
- Meighen in 1897
- Born: August 21, 1855; Forestville, Minnesota
- Died: February 12, 1936 (aged 80); Preston, Minnesota
- Occupations: Banker, Politician
- Political party: Greenback Party (1870s-1881); Farmer's Alliance (1892-1894); Populist (1894-1902); Democratic (1902-1922); Farmer-Labor (from 1922)
- Spouse: Mary Broderick (m. 1897)

Thomas J. Meighen (August 21, 1855 – February 12, 1936) was a U.S. politician from the state of Minnesota. His father was Felix Meighen, and his uncle was William Meighen.

== Early life ==
Meighen was born in Forestville, Minnesota. In the 1870s, a young Meighen became involved in politics, being quickly involved in the Greenback Party. He would encourage his uncle, William Meighen, to run for governor in 1877 and again in 1879. Following the dissolution of the Greenback Party, Meighen and his uncle would become aligned with the Farmer's Alliance.

== Political Career ==
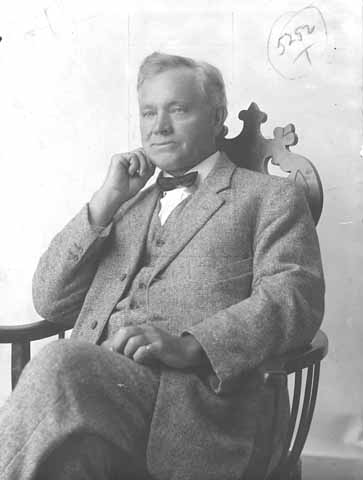
Thomas Meighen in 1920

Meighen's political career began when he became a major organizing member of the Farmer's Alliance in 1892. The Alliance had existed as a labor union prior to 1892, however 1892 was when the Alliance organized into a political party. Meighen was Vice President of the Alliance, and following its merger into the Populist Party, Meighen would serve as State Chair of the Party.

In 1894, Meighen would launch his first political campaign, running for Minnesota's 1st Congressional District as a Populist. Meighen finished third against incumbent James A. Tawney. In 1898, Populist and Democratic Fusion candidate John Lind would be elected governor. Lind appointed Meighen to the State Board of Equalization, and Meighen would serve from 1899 until 1900. Later in 1900, he ran for Lieutenant Governor of Minnesota, intended to serve alongside John Lind. Both Meighen and Lind would be defeated.

In 1902, Meighen would become the president of the First National Bank in Preston. With this job, Meighen and his family would move out of Forestville, being some of the last residents to leave the now-ghost town. Meighen would campaign for the townsite to be made a State Park, a wish that would be granted posthumously in 1963. In the 1902 Minnesota gubernatorial election, the Democratic Party nominated Leonard A. Rosing, causing the Populist-Democrat Fusion to collapse. Meighen was nominated by the Populists, however Meighen came in a distant third with only 1.78%.

Meighen would run twice for state offices as a Democrat, both times unsuccessfully. For Minnesota State Auditor in 1910, and for Senate in 1922. Meighen would find his permanent political home in the Farmer-Labor Party by 1926. In 1926, he ran for Minnesota State Treasurer, unsuccessfully. His final political campaign would be a second run for Lieutenant Governor in 1928, losing with 24.96% to Republican incumbent William I. Nolan.

Meighen would die in a hospital in Preston on February 12, 1936, shortly after returning from a visit to his daughter's house in Boston.

Party political offices
| Preceded by John Lind | Populist Party nominee for Governor of Minnesota; 1902 | Succeeded by Last |
