= Richard W. Johnson =

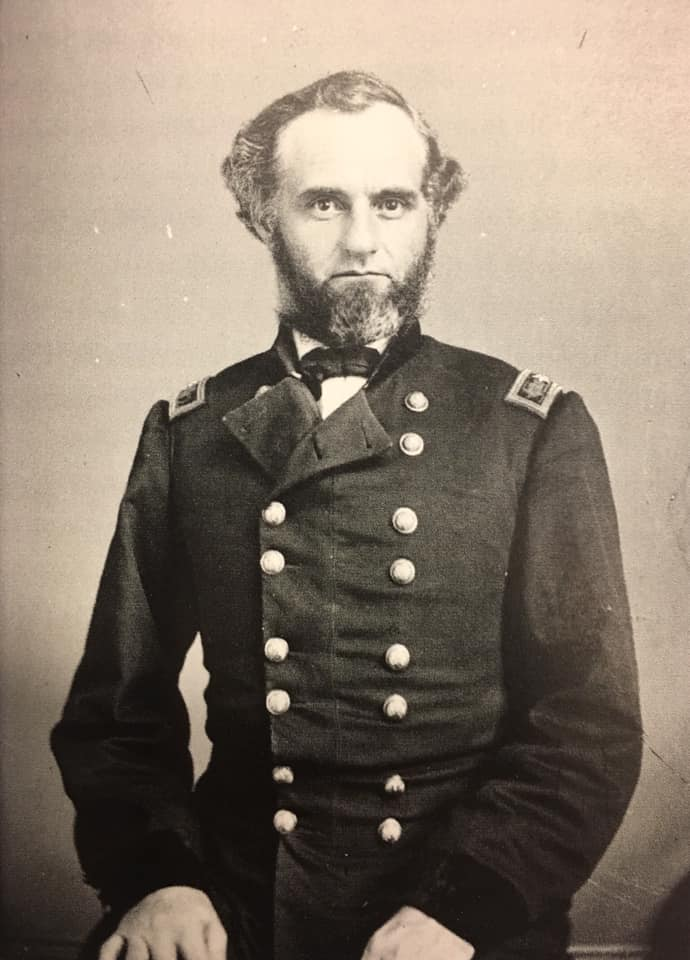
- Brigadier General Richard W. Johnson, c. 1864
- Born: February 27, 1827; Smithland, Kentucky
- Died: April 21, 1897 (aged 70); Saint Paul, Minnesota
- Burial place: Oakland Cemetery, Saint Paul, Minnesota
- Military career
- Allegiance: United States
- Branch: United States Army; Union Army
- Service years: 1849–1866
- Rank: Brigadier General; Brevet Major General
- Commands: 3rd Kentucky Cavalry Regiment; Second Division, XX Corps; Sixth Division, Cavalry Corps; First Division, XIV Corps; Cavalry Corps, Military Division of the Mississippi
- Conflicts: American Civil War; Battle of Chickamauga; Battle of Chattanooga; Battle of Missionary Ridge; Battle of New Hope Church; Battle of Utoy Creek; Battle of Nashville
- Other work: Soldier, author

Richard Woodhouse Johnson (February 27, 1827 – April 21, 1897) was an officer in the Union Army during the American Civil War.

== Life ==
=== Personal life ===
Richard Woodhouse Johnson was born on February 27, 1827, in Smithland, to James Johnson and Louisa Harmon Johnson. Johnson married Rachael Elizabeth Steele; they had two sons.

=== Early career ===
Johnson graduated from the United States Military Academy in 1849 and appointed a brevet second lieutenant in the 6th U.S. Infantry. Johnson's early career was uneventful during tours on the Canadian and Mexican borders. Johnson secured a branch transfer to the 2nd Cavalry in 1855, where he saw action in expeditions against Comanche and Washita warriors. Johnson was at the Cavalry School at Carlisle Barracks at the outbreak of the Civil War. The War Department appointed Johnson lieutenant colonel of the 3rd Kentucky Cavalry Regiment and soon after was promoted to brigadier general, United States Volunteers. As a cavalry commander he took part in the western campaigns of 1861 and 1862. On August 21, 1862, he was defeated and captured by Colonel John Hunt Morgan, whom he had been sent to drive out of Tennessee.

=== In the Army of the Cumberland ===
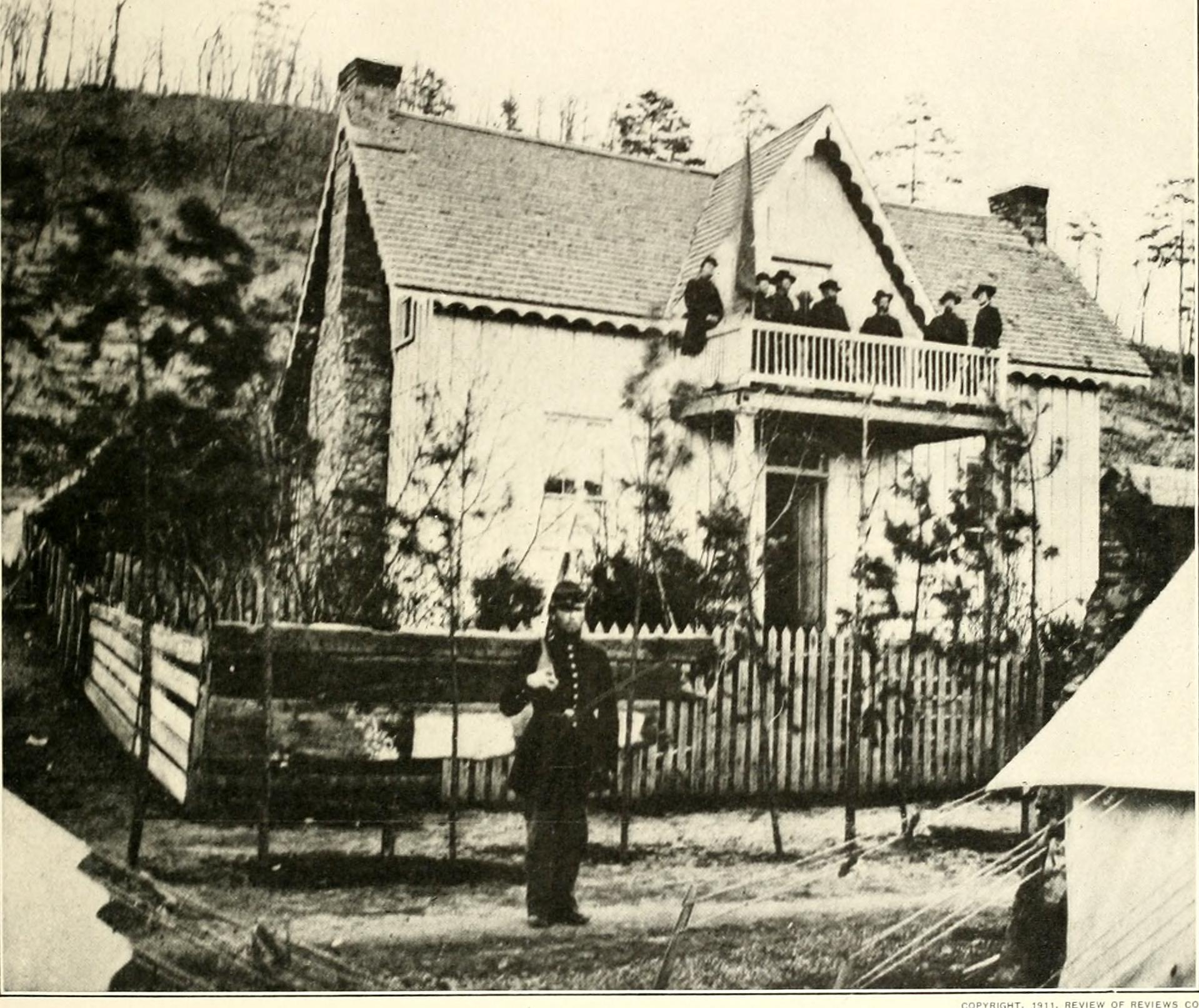
In Graysville, northern Georgia

Johnson was exchanged in December 1862 and took command of a division in the Army of the Cumberland. Johnson led his division at the Battle of Stones River. Johnson continued in division command during the middle Tennessee campaign of 1863. At the Battle of Chickamauga, his division was attached to Maj. Gen. Alexander M. McCook's XX Corps. On the second day of the battle, Johnston's division fell in with Maj. Gen. George Henry Thomas on the Union left. During the Battle of Chattanooga, Johnson's division was one of the several that charged up Missionary Ridge. Johnson remained in division command attached to the XIV Corps (Union Army) commanded by MG John M. Palmer, of the Army of the Cumberland during the Atlanta campaign of 1864. Johnson's division performed creditably at all of the major engagements of the campaign until he was severely wounded at the Battle of New Hope Church on May 28, 1864.

=== Later service ===
Johnson briefly served as Chief of Cavalry for the Military Division of the Mississippi before stepping down to command a division in General James H. Wilson's cavalry corps – where he fought at the Battle of Nashville. Johnson received a total of five brevet promotions for his battlefield performance, culminating with a major general's brevet in the Regular Army. Johnson was mustered out of the volunteer service on January 15, 1866. Johnson served as the Provost-Marshal and acting Judge Advocate of the Military Division of the Tennessee 1865-66 and had brief stints in the Department of the Tennessee and the Department of the Cumberland. Johnson retired from active service on 12 October 1867 as "Major-General (changed to Brig.-General, By Law of March 3, 1875) for disability from wounds received in battle."

After his retirement, Johnson served as the Professor of Military Science at the Missouri State University from July 1868 to January 1869 and published military treatises and articles.

He published A Soldier's Reminiscences in Peace and War (1866) and a Memoir of Major General George H. Thomas (1881).

On December 6, 1865, Johnson was elected as a Veteran Companion of the Pennsylvania Commandery of the Military Order of the Loyal Legion of the United States (MOLLUS), a military society of officers who had served in the Union armed forces during the Civil War. He was assigned MOLLUS insignia number 99.

Johnson's first entry into politics was in 1879, when he was a primary contender for the Democratic nomination for governor. He withdrew after the first ballot. Johnson ran for Governor of Minnesota in 1881 as a Democrat, but lost to Republican Lucius Frederick Hubbard; he received about 35% of the vote.

Johnson died on April 21, 1897, in Saint Paul, Minnesota, and is buried there in Oakland Cemetery.

== See also ==
- List of American Civil War Generals (Union)

== Footnotes ==
Party political offices
Preceded by Edmund Rice	Democratic nominee for Governor of Minnesota; 1881	Succeeded by Adolph Biermann
