= 1881 Minnesota gubernatorial election =

- November 8, 1881
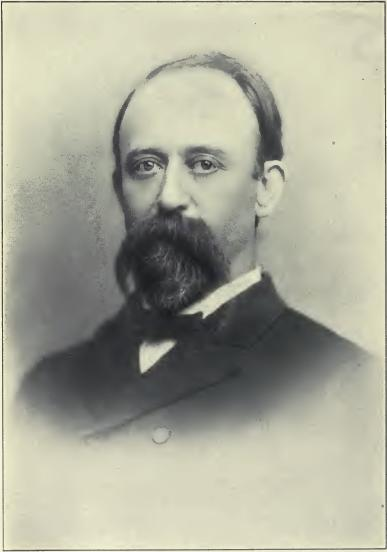

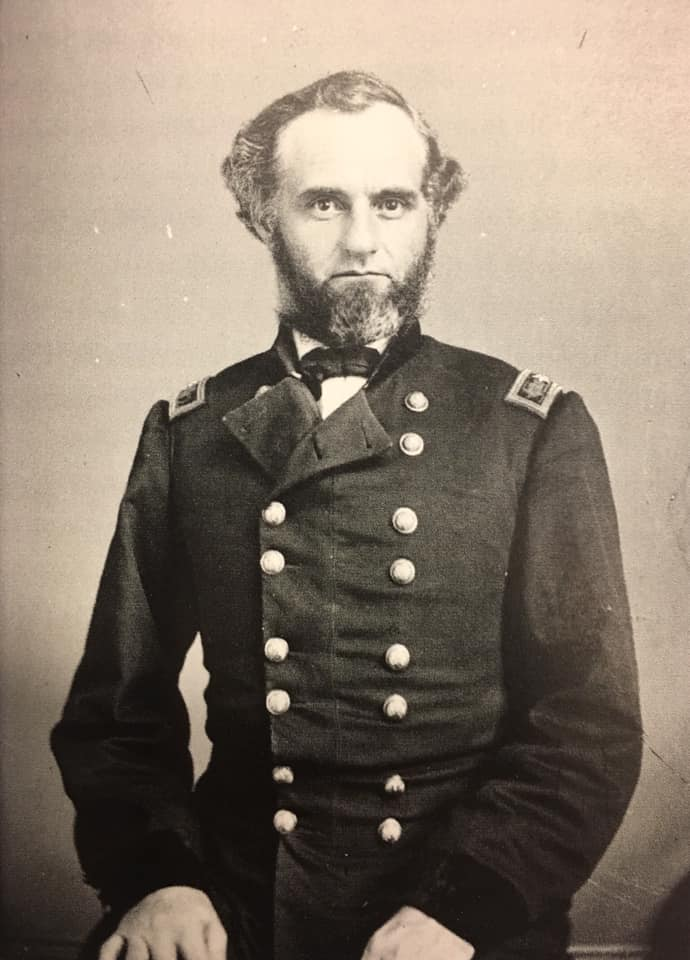
Nominee	Lucius Frederick Hubbard	Richard W. Johnson
Party	Republican	Democratic
Popular vote	65,025	37,168
Percentage	61.53%	35.17%
- County results Hubbard: 50–60% 60–70% 70–80% 80–90% 90–100% Johnson: 50–60% 60–70% 70–80% No data/vote
Governor before election
John S. Pillsbury
Republican
Elected Governor
Lucius Frederick Hubbard
Republican

The 1881 Minnesota gubernatorial election was held on November 8, 1881, to elect the governor of Minnesota. Incumbent governor John S. Pillsbury was not nominated for a fourth term, in favor of Lucius Frederick Hubbard, who was elected.

== Candidates ==
- Lucius Frederick Hubbard, Civil War veteran (Republican)
- Richard W. Johnson, Civil War veteran (Democrat)
- Charles H. Roberts, professor (Greenback)
- Isaac C. Stearns, former member of the Minnesota House of Representatives (Prohibition)

== Campaigns ==
On September 28, 1881, the Republican State Convention was held. Despite Hubbard being the overwhelming favorite, multiple other candidates contested in the primary, notably incumbent John S. Pillsbury. Other primary candidates were Andrew Ryan McGill, Thomas Burr Clement, Clark W. Thompson, and J.C. Stover. Stover dropped out after the first informal ballot. In the first formal ballot, Hubbard had an overwhelming victory with 160 votes to runner-up Pillsbury's 51. A delegate opposed to Hubbard said, "Ye love darkness rather than light because your deeds are evil". Passed by acclamation, it was agreed to unanimously nominate Hubbard as the final result. The scene following his nomination was one of 'wild enthusiasm".

On October 6, 1881, the Democratic State Convention was held. The only primary candidate was Richard W. Johnson, who was voted unanimously by acclamation.

== Results ==
Minnesota gubernatorial election, 1881
Party	Candidate	Votes	%
Republican	Lucius Frederick Hubbard	65,025	61.53
Democratic	Richard W. Johnson	37,168	35.17
Greenback	C. H. Roberts	2,676	2.53
Prohibition	Isaac C. Stearns	708	0.67
	Write-Ins	109	0.10
Total votes		105,686	100
Republican hold			
