= William Meighen =

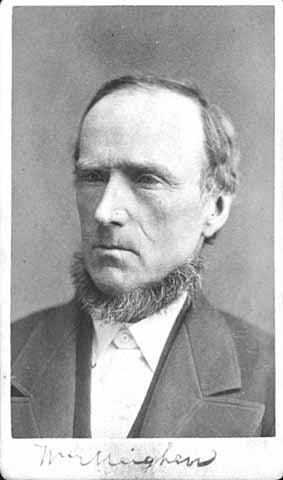

Member of the Minnesota Senate from the 3rd district
- In office 1873–1877
- Preceded by: John Q. Farmer
- Succeeded by: Charles G. Edwards

Member of the Minnesota House of Representatives from the 9th district
- In office 1859–1861

Member of the Minnesota House of Representatives from the 14th district
- In office 1868–1870

Personal details
- Born: December 5, 1816 Waynesburg, Pennsylvania
- Died: March 22, 1899 (aged 82) Forestville, Minnesota
- Party: Democrat (to 1870), Greenback Party (from 1870s); Populist
- Spouse: Catherine Foster Meighen

William Meighen (December 5, 1816 – March 22, 1899) was a politician from the U.S. State of Minnesota. He was the younger brother of Felix Meighen, and the uncle of Thomas Meighen.

== Biography ==
He was born to Irish-American immigrants in Waynesburg, Pennsylvania. After he fell into bankruptcy in Pennsylvania, he moved to Galena, Illinois in 1843. In 1849, due to the California Gold Rush, Meighen moved briefly to California, successfully earning enough money in gold to return to Pennsylvania and settle his debts. He then returned to his house in Galena.

William's older brother, Felix Meighen's brother-in-law Robert Foster, would buy land in Fillmore County, Minnesota in 1853. Robert would gift land to Felix and William. In October of 1853, both of them would move to the new land. The town that developed in the land would become Forestville, Minnesota.

== Political career ==
Meighen began his political career shortly after moving to Forestville. He would represent his area in the Minnesota House of Representatives twice, first from 1859 – 1861, and again from 1868 – 1870. He would also be elected to the Minnesota Senate from 1873 – 1877. While in office, he was a Democrat.

In the 1870s, his nephew, Thomas Meighen, would become involved in the Greenback Party. His nephew would convince him to run for Governor in 1877. Initially, Meighen ran for the Democratic nomination, but lost to William L. Banning. He then ran on a separate Greenback ticket. Despite coming in a distant third, he would run a second time in 1879. The Greenback party would cease to exist in Minnesota by 1882. Most of its voters went back to major parties. Meighen gravitated towards the Farmer's Alliance, as did his nephew. Meighen was opposed to the issuance of state bonds for railroad construction, and was instrumental in passing a Constitutional Amendment mandating all state bonds just be approved by popular referendum. Governor John S. Pillsbury had to reconstruct the Supreme Court of Minnesota to have the amendment overruled.

Meighen became unpopular in his community, being called by the newspaper Broadside as "money-mongerers, userers, and land pirates."

As a Greenback, Meighen would run to retake his position in the State Senate twice, in 1882 and 1888. Despite his lack of success, he would come to know other politicians of the day, notably Ignatius Donnelly, and later Governor John Lind.
