= Edmund Rice (politician) =

American politician and entrepreneur (1819–1889)

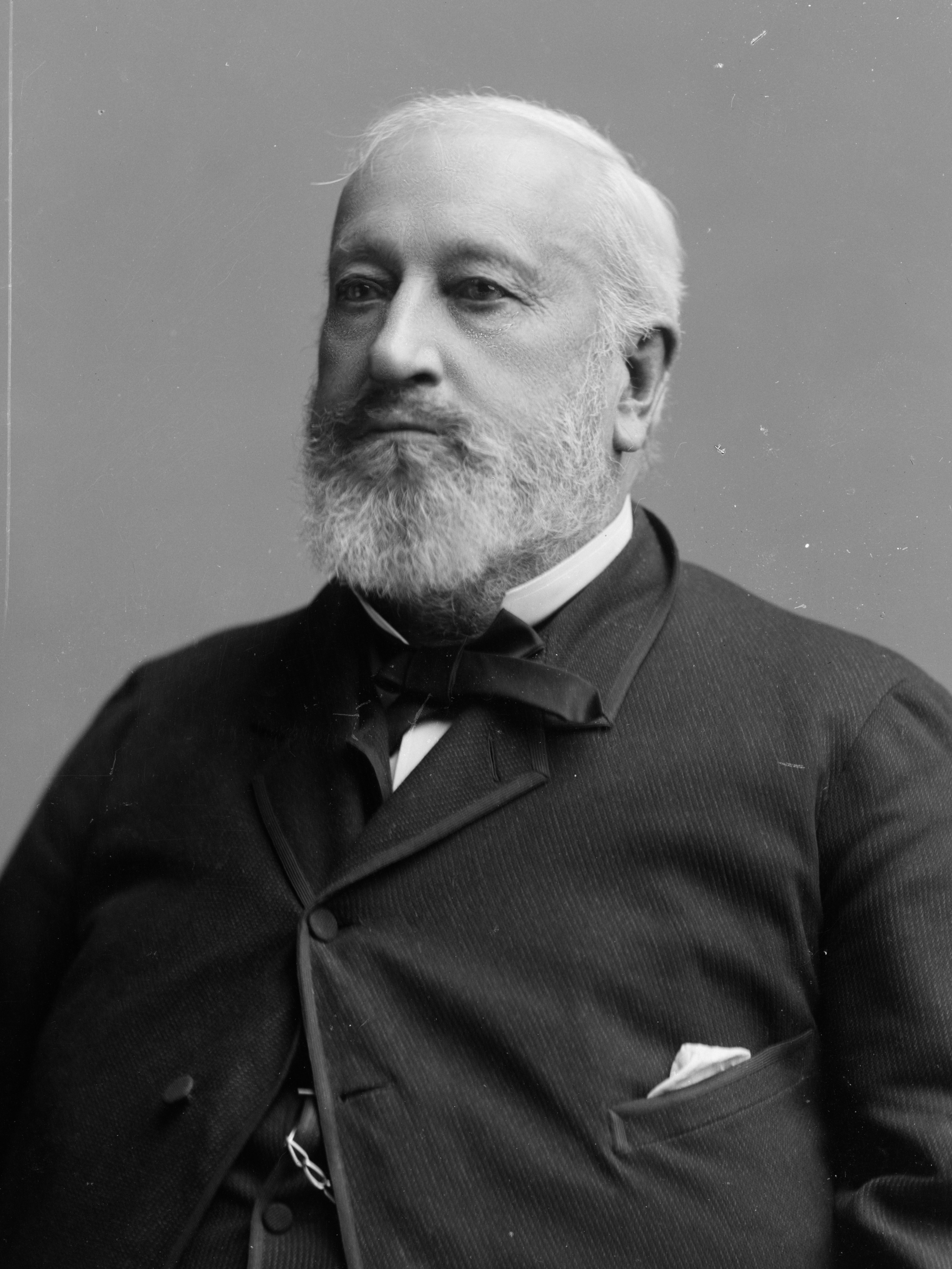
- Rice c. 1873 – c. 1889

Member of the U.S. House of Representatives from Minnesota's 4th district
- In office March 4, 1887 – March 3, 1889
- Preceded by: John Gilfillan
- Succeeded by: Samuel Snider

Member of the Minnesota House of Representatives
- In office January 2, 1877 – January 6, 1879
- In office January 2, 1872 – January 6, 1873
- In office January 8, 1867 – January 6, 1868

Member of the Minnesota Senate
- In office January 7, 1873 – January 4, 1875
- In office January 5, 1864 – January 1, 1866
- Preceded by: James K. Smith
- Succeeded by: William Pitt Murray

Personal details
- Born: February 14, 1819 Waitsfield, Vermont
- Died: July 11, 1889 (aged 70) White Bear Lake, Minnesota
- Resting place: Oakland Cemetery, Saint Paul, Minnesota
- Party: Democratic
- Spouse: Anna Maria Acker
- Children: 11

Edmund Rice (February 14, 1819 – July 11, 1889) was an American politician. A member of the Democratic Party, he represented Minnesota's 4th congressional district in the United States House of Representatives from 1887 to 1889.

== Early life ==
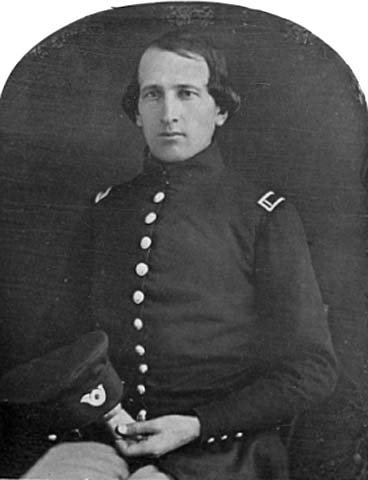
Lt. Edmund Rice, 1847

Edmund Rice Jr. was born in Waitsfield, Vermont on February 14, 1819, to Edmund Rice and Ellen (Durkee) Rice, ethnic English whose ancestors had been in New England since the 17th century. His father--of the same name--died when he was young and his mother and some siblings moved to Kalamazoo, Michigan. His brother Henry Mower Rice left Kalamazoo for the West about the time Edmund began to study law in November 1838. Edmund was appointed registrar of the court of chancery in 1841. The next year he was admitted to the bar association and commenced to practice law in Kalamazoo. He was appointed master in chancery in 1845. Rice enlisted to serve in the Mexican–American War in 1847 and was commissioned first lieutenant of Company A, First Regiment, Michigan Volunteers. He married Anna Maria Acker in Kalamazoo on November 28, 1848.

== Legal, Business, and Political careers ==
In July 1849, shortly after the creation of the Minnesota Territory, the Rices moved to Saint Paul, Minnesota, where Henry M. Rice and his new wife had also begun residence. Their sister Ellen and brothers Charles R. Rice and Orrin Rice also moved to Minnesota Territory from Kalamazoo during the Territorial period. Edmund became clerk of the Minnesota Supreme Court's third circuit in 1849. He was elected as a member of the Territorial House of Representatives in 1851.

Initially Edmund Rice practiced law in St. Paul, Minnesota Territory in partnership with George Becker and Henry's brother-in-law Ellis Whitall. Among their prestigious clients was financier Hercules L. Dousman of Prairie du Chien, a sometime partner of Henry Rice. Whitall left the practice for the South and Ellen Rice's husband William Hollinshead joined the partnership which continued until Edmund Rice left in 1856 when he was elected commissioner of Ramsey County.

Edmund Rice was involved in the early plans for railroads to connect Minnesota with the West and with Lake Superior. In 1854 his first "paper railroad" was the Minnesota and Northwestern Railroad. It was implicated in a quid pro quo scheme in Congress in 1854 in which text of bill submitted by Henry M. Rice as Minnesota Delegate to the House of Representative's bill for a railroad land grant was altered, a notorious event in Territorial history. The bill passed but then was recalled when the altered text was discovered. In 1857 he became president of the Minnesota & Pacific Railroad Co. (which became the St. Paul and Pacific), a position he held until 1863, when he became president of both the St. Paul & Pacific Railroad and the St. Paul & Chicago Railroad. He served as SP&P president until 1872 and as SP&C president until 1877. In December 1858 Edmund Rice and his Minnesota and Pacific were embroiled in a case at the U.S. Supreme Court. In 1879, Edmund Rice became a trustee of the SP&P.

Rice was a director in a syndicate of investors in the young town of Superior, Wisconsin, and held leadership roles for many years. He also speculatively bought lands for himself and for his businesses in St. Paul and elsewhere. The area north of St. Paul that included White Bear and French Canadian communities interested him. His home was in the "Trout Brook" area just north of St. Paul, a waterway now almost entirely routed underground. His name can be found on many early maps of landholdings in Ramsey County as well as the St. Paul railroad hub. When Rice's railroad dream finally became a reality, his companies contributed to St. Paul's rise as a railroad town. He hired workers of many nationalities who often resided in the vicinity of St. Paul's East Side near Swede Hollow on Phalen Creek. Many generations would say that someone in their family "worked for the Railroad."

Rice served in the Minnesota State Senate (1864–66) and (1874–76), and was a member of the Minnesota House of Representatives in 1867, 1872, 1877, and 1878. He was elected mayor of St. Paul and served from 1881 to 1883, was again elected mayor in 1885, and served until February 1887 when he resigned to take an office in the 50th United States Congress (March 4, 1887, to March 3, 1889).

In 1877, he ran for Governor, but was defeated by William L. Banning in the primary, despite being an early favorite. In the 1879 Minnesota gubernatorial election, he successfully won the primary and became the Democratic nominee for Governor of Minnesota. Incumbent Governor John Pillsbury defeated him and was elected to a third term.

After being defeated in 1888, Rice retired from public and political activities. He died in White Bear Lake, Minnesota, on July 11, 1889. His body is interred in Oakland Cemetery in Saint Paul.

== Ancestry ==
Rice was a descendant of Edmund Rice, an early immigrant to Massachusetts Bay Colony, as follows:

- Edmund Rice, son of
  - Edmund Rice (March 26, 1784 – May 27, 1829), son of
  - Jedediah Rice (b. April 2, 1755), son of

  - Ashur Rice (July 6, 1694 – August 20, 1773), son of
  - Thomas Rice (June 30, 1654 – 1747), son of
  - Thomas Rice (January 26, 1626 – 1682), son of

      - Edmund Rice (1594 – May 3, 1663)

He had 11 children. Ellen Rice, Jessie Rice, Annie Rice, Rachel Rice, Edmund Rice III, Stuart Rice, Sedgwick Rice, William Acker Rice, Maria Rice, Virginia Rice, and Philip Durkee Rice.

His daughter Jessi married Frank Hamilton Clark, a president of the Lake Superior and Mississippi Railroad and a member of the Clark banking family of Philadelphia, Pennsylvania.

Party political offices
| Preceded by William L. Banning | Democratic nominee for Governor of Minnesota; 1879 | Succeeded by Richard W. Johnson |
U.S. House of Representatives
| Preceded by John Gilfillan | U.S. Representative from Minnesota's 4th congressional district 1887–1889 | Succeeded by Samuel Snider |
