= Theodore J. Eames =

American businessman and politician

- Ambrotype of Eames c. 1858

Postmaster of Preston, Minnesota
- In office July 11, 1859 – March 29, 1860
- Preceded by: Luther Preston
- Succeeded by: Decatur B. Colman

Member of the Minnesota House of Representatives from the 9th District
- In office December 2, 1857 – December 6, 1859 Serving with Isaac DeCow, Tollef Fladeland, Major J. Foster, James M. Graham, and Henry Kibler
- Governor: Samuel Medary; Henry Hastings Sibley

Personal details
- Born: Theodore Jackson Eames; October 11, 1828 Oneida County, New York, U.S.
- Died: October 14, 1871 (aged 43) Lewisville, Texas, U.S.

Theodore Jackson Eames (October 11, 1828 – October 14, 1871), also known as T.J. Eames or J.T. Eames, was an American businessman, politician, and early citizen of Canton Township in Fillmore County, Minnesota. Eames served a single term in the Minnesota House of Representatives.

== Early life and career ==
Eames was born on October 11, 1828, in Oneida County, New York. Eames moved to Minnesota Territory in 1854 and settled in Canton Township in Fillmore County. Eames was a merchant, in 1857 he moved his business to Preston, Minnesota and engaged in the mercantile trade, however, due to poor sales Eames was forced to close his business.

== Political career ==
Eames was elected on October 13, 1857, to serve in the Minnesota House of Representatives, representing Minnesota's 9th House district. At the time the district consisted of Fillmore County. Eames served during the 1st Minnesota Legislature. During his term Eames was the chairman of the federal relations committee and was a member of the Minnesota House's judiciary committee.

Eames later served as the postmaster of Preston, Minnesota from July 11, 1859, to March 29, 1860. He was preceded by Luther Preston and succeeded by Decatur B. "D.B." Colman.

== Later life ==
Eames was later the proprietor of the Stanwix Hotel, later named the Tibbetts House, in Preston which he operated for a year. Eames later moved back to his farm near Lenora, Minnesota where he farmed until moving to Lewisville, Texas in 1869. Eames died on October 14, 1871, in Lewisville.

== Personal life ==
Eames was married to Emeline E. Ostine on November 15, 1849, in Amherst, Ohio. Together they had seven children.
