= Senator Snyder =

Senator Snyder may refer to:

- Adam W. Snyder (1799–1842), Illinois State Senate
- Bert B. Snyder (1886–1955), California State Senate
- Charles A. Snyder (1867–1931), Pennsylvania State Senate
- Cooper Snyder (1928–2019), Ohio State Senate
- Duke Snyder (Nebraska politician) (born 1941), Nebraska State Senate
- Frederic Beal Snyder (1859–1951), Minnesota State Senate
- George Snyder (politician) (1929–2017), Maryland State Senate
- H. Diane Snyder (fl. 2000s–2010s), New Mexico State Senate
- Herb Snyder (1953–2026), West Virginia State Senate
- Mark Snyder (politician) (1946–2020), Oklahoma State Senate
- Oliver P. Snyder (1833–1882), Arkansas State Senate
- Richard A. Snyder (1910–1978), Pennsylvania State Senate
- Sid Snyder (1926–2012), Washington State Senate
- Simon Snyder (1759–1819), Pennsylvania State Senate (died before taking office)
- Thomas C. Snyder (1843–1906), Ohio State Senate
- Vic Snyder (born 1947), Arkansas State Senate
- William Preston Snyder (1851–1920), Pennsylvania State Senate
