= James M. Graham (Minnesota politician) =

American politician

- Ambrotype of Graham c. 1858

Member of the Minnesota House of Representatives from the 9th district
- In office December 2, 1857 – December 6, 1859 Serving with Isaac DeCow, Theodore J. Eames, Tollef Fladeland, Major J. Foster, James C. Frost, and Henry Kibler
- Governor: Samuel Medary

Personal details
- Born: December 19, 1816 Madison County, Ohio, U.S.
- Died: March 31, 1866 (aged 49) Minnesota, U.S.
- Resting place: Lenora Cemetery; Lenora, Minnesota, U.S.

James Monroe Graham (December 19, 1816 – March 31, 1866) was an American politician and early citizen of Canton, Minnesota who served a single term in the Minnesota Legislature.

== Early life ==
Graham was born on December 19, 1816, in Madison County, Ohio.^{:423} Graham moved to Minnesota Territory in 1854 and settled in Canton, Minnesota.^{:423}^{:619}^{:290}

== Political career ==
Graham was elected to serve in the Minnesota House of Representatives on October 13, 1857, as a representative of the 9th House district (Fillmore County).^{:106} Graham served in the 1st Minnesota Legislature, during his term he was a member of the enrolled bills committee.

== Death ==
Graham died on March 31, 1866.^{:423}^{:620}
