= Isaac DeCow =

American politician

- Ambrotype of DeCow c. 1858

Member of the Minnesota House of Representatives from the 9th district
- In office December 2, 1857 – December 6, 1859 Serving with Tollef Fladeland, Theodore J. Eames, Major J. Foster, Henry Kibler, and James M. Graham
- Governor: Samuel Medary; Henry Hastings Sibley

Isaac DeCow, also spelled as Isaac DeCou, was an American politician, businessman, and early citizen of Fillmore County, Minnesota who served a single term in the Minnesota House of Representatives.

== Early life and career ==
DeCow's origins are relatively unknown. DeCow moved to Minnesota Territory in 1856 from the state of New York alongside settler D.J. Mosher and settled in the village of Fillmore, Minnesota. While in Fillmore, DeCow built a store which was the first store in the village.

DeCow was later elected to serve in the Minnesota House of Representatives on October 13, 1857, representing Minnesota's 9th House district in the 1st Minnesota Legislature. The 9th Minnesota House district was represented by DeCow alongside Tollef Fladeland, Theodore J. Eames, Major J. Foster, Henry Kibler, and James M. Graham. During his term in the legislature DeCow was a member of the education and science committee.

== Later life ==
According to the first volume of the book History of Fillmore County, Minnesota by Franklyn Curitss-Wedge, DeCow remained in Fillmore for only three years before moving to Michigan and later settling in Kansas.
