= Isaac C. Stearns =

American politician

Member of the Minnesota House of Representatives
- In office December 7, 1859 – January 7, 1861
- Governor: Henry Hastings Sibley; Alexander Ramsey
- Preceded by: Hans Holtan
- Succeeded by: Horace B. Strait

Personal details
- Born: February 28, 1820 New Ipswich, New Hampshire, U.S.
- Died: September 7, 1910 (aged 90) Zumbrota, Minnesota, U.S.
- Party: Prohibition Party

Isaac C. Stearns (February 28, 1820 – September 7, 1910), sometimes written as I.C. Stearns, was an American printer, farmer, and politician.

== Early life ==
Stearns was born on February 28, 1820 in New Ipswich, New Hampshire. Stearns moved to Brooklyn in 1853 where he worked in the field of printing and publication, specifically in printing various editions of The Mothers' Magazine and Merry's Museum. Stearns first moved to Minnesota Territory in 1857 to Zumbrota in Goodhue County where he worked as a farmer.

== Politics ==
On October 11, 1859 Stearns was successfully elected to serve a term in the Minnesota House of Representatives and served during the 2nd Minnesota Legislature from December 7, 1859 to January 7, 1861, while in office he worked on the Committee for Internal Improvements. Following his term in the Minnesota House Stearns would run several unsuccessful political campaigns for various state and national offices.

In 1878 Stearns campaigned as a Prohibition Party candidate for a seat in the United States House of Representatives from Minnesota's 2nd House District, Stearns lost to Minnesota Democrat Henry Poehler. In 1879 Stearns campaigned for the office of Minnesota Secretary of State during the 1879 Minnesota Secretary of State election, he lost to Minnesota Republican Frederick von Baumbach. In 1880 Stearns attempted to again run for the same 2nd House District for the United States House of Representatives as a Prohibition candidate, he lost to Minnesota Republican Horace B. Strait. In 1880 Stearns ran for the office of Governor of Minnesota winning only 0.67% of the vote, he lost to Lucius Frederick Hubbard. Stearns' final political campaign as a Prohibition candidate occurred in 1884 during the 1884 General election for a position in the United States House of Representatives, representing Minnesota's 3rd House District. Stearns won 1.77% of the vote he lost to Horace B. Strait.

== Later life ==
Stearns continued to work as a farmer in Zumbrota, primarily in farming wheat. Stearns served as the town clerk for Zumbrota in 1859, the city assessor in 1860, and the city treasurer in 1861. Stearns died on September 7, 1910 in Zumbrota.

== Personal life ==
Stearns had three different wives throughout his life. Stearns was first married to Lucy T. Wheeler, also of New Ipswich, in November of 1845, together they had two daughters. Stearns was married to his second wife, Amanda P. Eames, in August of 1860. Stearns was married to his third wife, Arvilla L. Grover in November of 1873.

Party political offices
Preceded by William W. Satterlee	Prohibition nominee for Governor of Minnesota; 1881	Succeeded by Charles E. Holt
