= Austin Willey =

American abolitionist (1806–1896)

Rev. Austin Willey
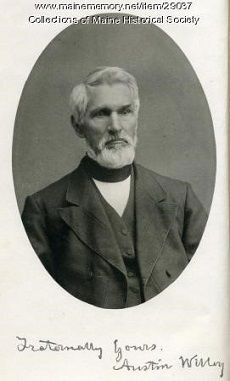
- Born: June 24, 1806; Campton, New Hampshire
- Died: March 28, 1896 (aged 89); Northfield, Minnesota
- Years active: 1839-C.1886
- Parents: Darius Willey Jr. (father); Mary Willey (mother)

Rev. Austin Willey (June 24, 1806– March 28, 1896) was a 19th-century American Congregationalist preacher, abolitionist, author, and editor.

== Early life ==
Willey was born in Campton, New Hampshire, on June 24, 1806. Due to the advanced age of his parents, he spent his time mostly at home, educated not at school but through reading and studying at home. While studying in theology at Bangor he became involved with the abolitionist movement. In 1839, he became the editor of the antislavery newspaper Advocate of Freedom. The paper went through multiple name changes, including Liberty Standard, Free Soil Republican, and finally Portland Enquirer. Due to ill health, he retired in 1858 and moved to Northfield, Minnesota the following year.

== In Minnesota ==
Once in Minnesota, Willey worked part-time for the Northfield Standard and the St. Paul Daily. In Minnesota, he also became active in the Temperance Movement. In 1871, he was a public supporter of Governor Horace Austin's re-election campaign. In 1877, he was the Prohibition Party candidate for Governor of Minnesota. In 1886, he published the book 'history of the anti-slavery cause', which was used as a textbook in Minnesota at the time of his death, in 1896.

== Excerpts ==
Excerpts from Austin Willey’s The History of the Antislavery Cause in State and Nation:

“The class of men who first enlisted [in antislavery in Maine] was not exceeded, if equaled, by any other of the same number in the state for intelligence, ability, moral and Christian worth. They laid reputation, fortune, and life if need be, on the altar of liberty and dared the conflict…. [They] gave the cause moral power at the outset; and left the allies of slavery no arguments but detraction and mobs.” (p.43)

“A call dated August 16, 1834, for a state convention to form a Maine Antislavery Society, to be held on the third Wednesday of October in Augusta, was sent over the state for signatures…

“George Thompson had come over from England. The work being accomplished there, for Britain emancipation had now become law, though with the apprenticeship provision, which was soon struck out. He was appealed to by Mr. Garrison and others to come to this country and aid in the great work in which he had been so influential at home. He was persuaded and came in the fall of 1834. He was a young man of remarkable powers....

“Mr. Thompson lectured in Brunswick with persuasive effect upon the students of Bowdoin, and others who heard him. From there he went to Waterville where the students of another college shared the thrilling power of his eloquence. Then he was invited back again to Brunswick where students and a dense crowd felt again his power. Then he returned to Portland and lectured six times in as many churches. He went from there to New Hampshire, then to many other states, east and west, and did great, timely work for the cause of the oppressed. But mobs followed him in this land of liberty simply for appealing to us to be honest and stand by our profession of equal rights.”(pp. 45–46). Source: Rev. Austin Willey, The History of the Antislavery Cause in State and Nation (Portland, Maine, 1886). See review by George H. Baker, Political Science Quarterly, Vol. 1, No. 3 (Sep., 1886), pp. 493–494. Also published by New York: Negro University Press, 1969.

The 1852 Democratic National Convention:

Austin Willey of Maine asserted that the compromise proposal was ambiguous enough to allow anyone to interpret it as he wished, but he believed this was no recommendation and urged its rejection. Source: William Goodell’s Dictionary of American Biography (N. Y., 1928) Source: cip.cornell.edu/DPubS/Repository/1.0/Disseminate/psu.ph/1133212435/body/pdf

About the antislavery speeches of Austin Willey, William Lloyd Garrison and Rev. David Thurston:

“There was little in the culture or society of Portland to discourage the Gordon’s – or any other seamen – from pursuing careers as slavers. New England's sea captains had sailed to Africa for generations in search of native cargoes. And of all the Northern states, Maine was known as the "least likely to burn with the fires of abolition." By virtue of its geography, as well as a minuscule African American population, it was literally the farthest removed from the heat of the slavery issue. In 1840, when Gordon was 14 years of age, Portland counted only 402 African Americans, out of 15,218 residents; by 1860, the year of his final voyage, the number of residents had grown to 26,342, while the African American population had dropped to 318. There was a small but fiercely dedicated core of men, though, who kept the antislavery issue "before an unappreciative public" from the early 1830s until the Civil War. Their impact was minimal, however. Throughout the state, the speeches of such abolitionist luminaries as William Lloyd Garrison, Austin Willey, and Reverend David Thurston were disrupted by mobs throwing eggs and wielding hoses, with the featured speaker exiting ignominiously through the rear door.” Source: Soodalter, Ron. Main Title: Hanging Captain Gordon : the life and trial of an American slave trader / Ron Soodalter. Edition Information: 1st Atria Books hardcover ed. Published/Created: New York : Atria Books, 2006. Description: xiii, 318 p. : ill.; 25 cm. ISBN 0-7432-6727-3, ISBN 978-0-7432-6727-4 Notes: Includes bibliographical references (p. [291]-300) and index.
