= Felix Meighen =

Felix J. Meighen
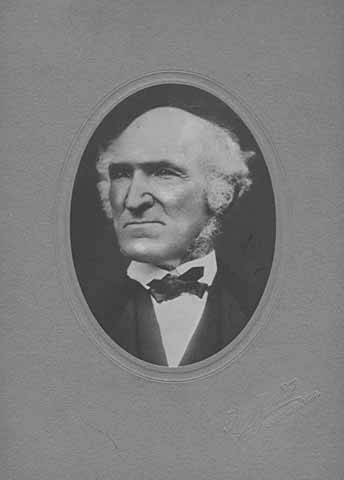
- Meighen in 1865
- Born: January 16, 1812; Greene County, Pennsylvania
- Died: January 21, 1896 (aged 84); Forestville, Minnesota
- Occupation: Businessman
- Years active: 1853 – 1896
- Spouse: Eliza Jane Meighen
- Children: 8, including Thomas

Felix Meighen (January 16, 1812 – January 21, 1896) was a businessman from the U.S. state of Minnesota. He was the younger brother of William Meighen and father to Thomas Meighen.

He was born to Irish-American immigrants in Greene County, Pennsylvania. Felix Meighen married Eliza Jane Foster in 1845. The couple moved to join Felix's younger brother, William, in Galena, Illinois. Eliza's two brothers, Major and Robert Foster, joined them shortly after. Robert Foster would buy land in Fillmore County, Minnesota, in 1853. Robert would gift land to Felix and William Meighen.

== Career ==
In October of 1853, both of them would move to the new land. The town that developed in the land would become Forestville, Minnesota. Meighen and Robert Foster founded the Forestville Store in 1853, originally as a log cabin. Meighen would build the current historical building in 1856-57.

In 1868, after the railroad bypassed the town, Foster withdrew his holdings in the store, leaving total control to Meighen. As the Meighen Store was the only place to buy most goods, Meighen now held complete control over the town. Meighen began to buy up land and turned Forestville into a company town, owned by himself. The last land not owned by Meighen was sold to him in 1889. The remaining residents worked on his land in exchange for continued residency in the town and store credit.

== Death and legacy ==
Meighen died on January 21, 1896. His son, Thomas Meighen, inherited the store. However, he was busy with his own career and had had little time for it. Forestville itself became a ghost town in 1902. Thomas Meighen closed the store in 1910, which by that time was the only remaining occupied structure.
