= 1869 Minnesota Secretary of State election =

- November 2, 1869
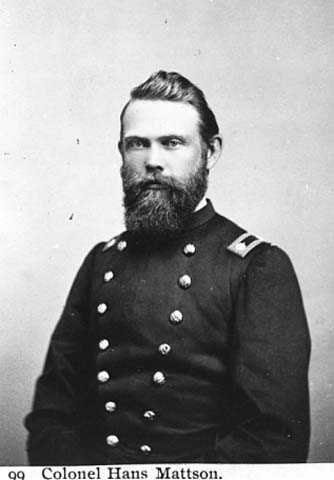

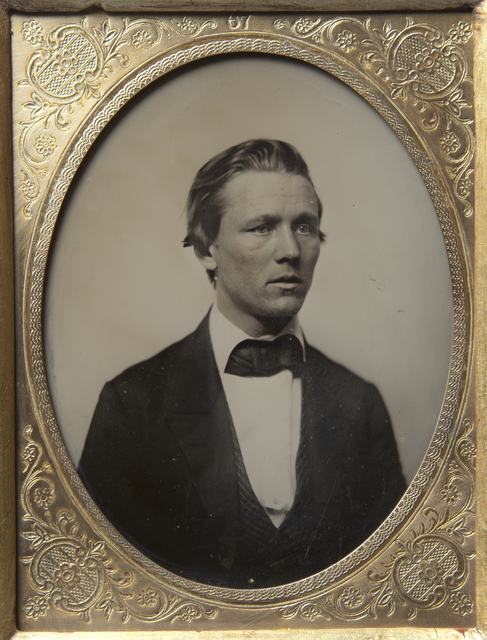
Nominee	Hans Mattson	Tollef Fladeland
Party	Republican	Democratic
Popular vote	29,287	24,188
Percentage	53.63%	44.29%
Secretary of State before election
Henry C. Rogers
Republican
Elected Secretary of State
Hans Mattson
Republican

The 1869 Minnesota Secretary of State election was held on November 2, 1869, in order to elect the Secretary of State of Minnesota. Republican nominee Hans Mattson defeated Democratic nominee Tollef G. Fladeland and Temperance nominee E.J. Thompson.

== General election ==
On election day, November 2, 1869, Republican nominee Hans Mattson won the election by a margin of 5,099 votes against his foremost opponent Democratic nominee Tollef G. Fladeland, thereby retaining Republican control over the office of Secretary of State. Mattson was sworn in as the 5th Minnesota Secretary of State on January 9, 1870.

=== Results ===
Minnesota Secretary of State election, 1869
Party	Candidate	Votes	%
Republican	Hans Mattson	29,287	53.63
Democratic	Tollef Fladeland	24,188	44.29
Prohibition	E.J. Thompson	1,133	2.08
Total votes		54,608	100.00
Republican hold			
