= William L. Banning =

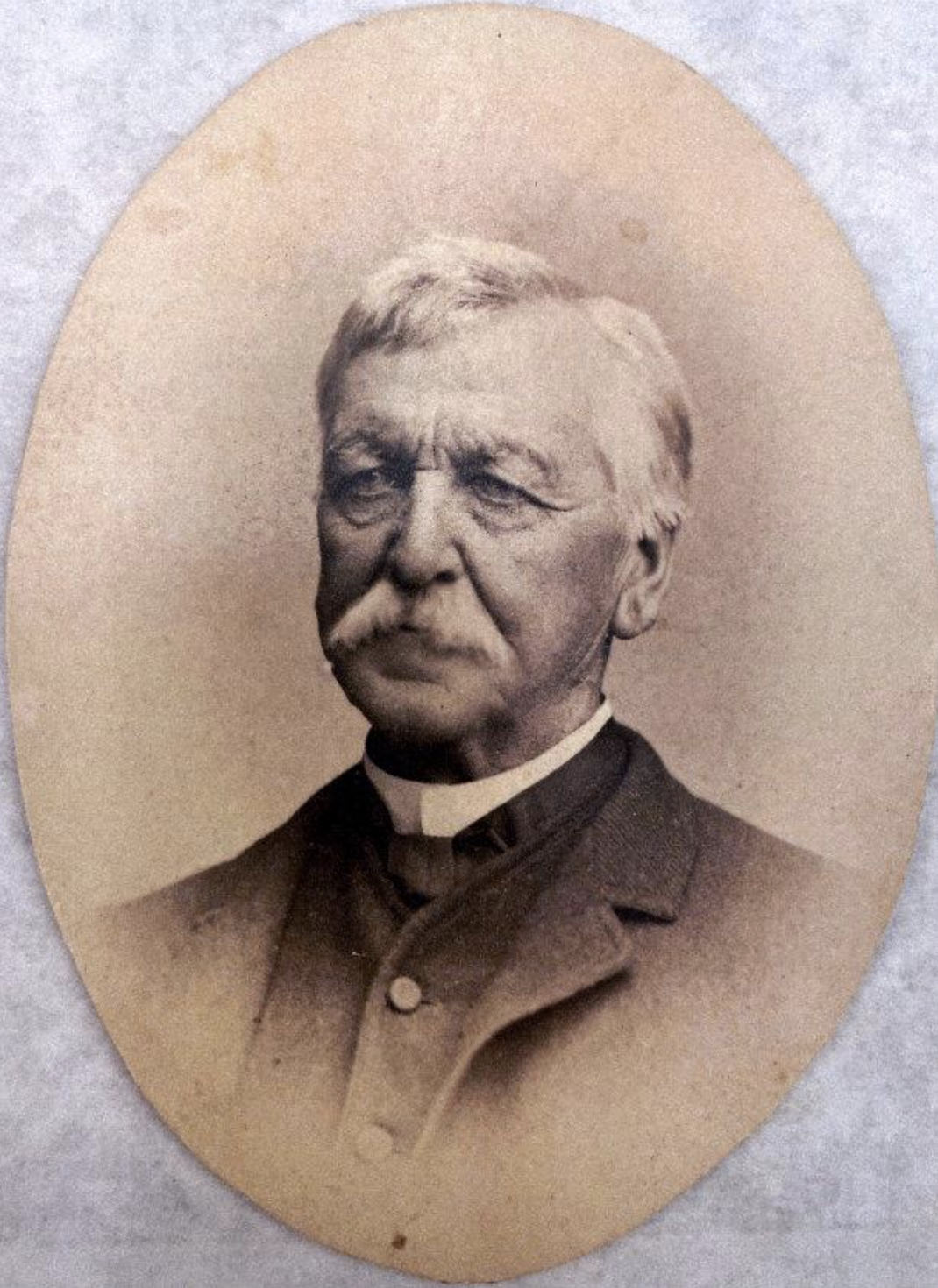
- Born: January 1814; Wilmington, Delaware
- Died: November 26, 1893 (aged 79); St. Paul, Minnesota
- Political party: Democratic (from C. 1877)
- Other political affiliations: Native American Party (C. 1840s), Republican (C.1860s)

William Lowber Banning (January 1814 – November 26, 1893) was a politician active in the U.S. State of Minnesota.

Banning was born in Wilmington, Delaware, and later moved to Pennsylvania. He served in the Pennsylvania House of Representatives representing Philadelphia in 1845. He was then a member of the Native American Party. He moved to Minnesota in 1854. In 1860, he was elected as a Republican to the Minnesota House of Representatives. He served one term.

In 1864, he became President of the Lake Superior and Mississippi River Railroad Company, a position he served in until 1871.

In 1877, he ran for Governor of Minnesota for the Democrats. He lost to incumbent John S. Pillsbury.

== Personal life ==
William Lowber Banning married Mary Alicia Sweeney. They had six children: William Lowber Banning, Jr., Ellen Barrows Banning Ayer, Evans Banning, May Alice Banning, Frederick Donlevy Banning, and Katharine Stewart Banning. William Lowber Banning died in 1893 and was interred in Oakland Cemetery in Saint Paul, Minnesota.

Until after his death, the Banning family resided in a mansion at 75 Wilkin Street in Saint Paul, Minnesota, which was later sold to the Jewish Home for the Aged of the Northwest. The home was razed after being condemned by a fire marshal in 1916 and is now the site of a multi-tenant dwelling.

== Banning, Minnesota ==
The town of Banning, Minnesota was named after him and served as a sandstone quarry for the St. Paul and Duluth Railroad. The town became a ghost town after fires in 1912. The land surrounding the ghost town was purchased by the state after the ratification of the Omnibus Natural Resources and Recreation Act of 1963, which now constitutes Banning State Park.

Party political offices
Preceded by David L. Buell	Democratic nominee for Governor of Minnesota; 1877	Succeeded by Edmund Rice
