= Bloomfield Township, Fillmore County, Minnesota =

Bloomfield Township, Minnesota
- Township
- Location within the state of Minnesota Bloomfield Township, Minnesota (the United States)
- Coordinates: 43°37′25″N 92°23′58″W
- Country: United States
- State: Minnesota
- County: Fillmore

Area
  - Total: 35.7 sq mi (92.5 km^{2})
  - Land: 35.7 sq mi (92.4 km^{2})
  - Water: 0.039 sq mi (0.1 km^{2})
- Elevation: 1,293 ft (394 m)

Population (2000)
  - Total: 414
  - Density: 12/sq mi (4.5/km^{2})
- Time zone: UTC-6 (Central (CST))
  - Summer (DST): UTC-5 (CDT)
- FIPS code: 27-06544
- GNIS feature ID: 0663617

Bloomfield Township is a township in Fillmore County, Minnesota, United States. The population was 414 at the 2000 census. Bloomfield Township borders Beaver Township, Forestville Township, and Spring Valley Township.

Bloomfield Township was organized in 1858.

== Geography ==
According to the United States Census Bureau, the township has a total area of 35.7 square miles (92 km^{2}), of which 35.7 square miles (92 km^{2}) is land and 0.04 square miles (0.10 km^{2}) (0.08%) is water.

== Demographics ==
As of the census of 2000, there were 414 people, 146 households, and 122 families residing in the township. The population density was 11.6 inhabitants per square mile (4.5/km^{2}). There were 157 housing units at an average density of 4.4 per square mile (1.7/km^{2}). The racial makeup of the township was 99.03% White, 0.24% African American, 0.48% Asian, and 0.24% from two or more races.

There were 146 households, out of which 39.7% had children under the age of 18 living with them, 79.5% were married couples living together, 2.1% had a female householder with no husband present, and 16.4% were non-families. 15.1% of all households were made up of individuals, and 6.2% had someone living alone who was 65 years of age or older. The average household size was 2.84 and the average family size was 3.17.

In the township the population was 28.7% under the age of 18, 5.8% from 18 to 24, 28.3% from 25 to 44, 21.7% from 45 to 64, and 15.5% who were 65 years of age or older. The median age was 37 years. For every 100 females, there were 110.2 males. For every 100 females age 18 and over, there were 110.7 males.

The median income for a household in the township was $47,813, and the median income for a family was $51,750. Males had a median income of $30,000 versus $29,107 for females. The per capita income for the township was $20,577. About 2.4% of families and 5.4% of the population were below the poverty line, including 8.8% of those under age 18 and none of those age 65 or over.
