= Greenleafton, Minnesota =

Unincorporated community in Minnesota, United States

Greenleafton
- Unincorporated community
- Location within Minnesota Location within the United States
- Coordinates: 43°34′39″N 92°12′34″W
- Country: United States
- State: Minnesota
- County: Fillmore
- Township: York Township
- Elevation: 1,355 ft (413 m)

Population
  - Total: 140
- Time zone: UTC-6 (Central (CST))
  - Summer (DST): UTC-5 (CDT)
- ZIP codes: 55965
- Area code: 507
- GNIS feature ID: 644449

Greenleafton is an unincorporated community in York Township, Fillmore County, Minnesota, United States.

The community is located southwest of Preston, at the junction of Fillmore County Roads 9 and 20. County Road 14 is also nearby. Greenleafton is located in the northeast corner of York Township.

Nearby places include Cherry Grove, Preston, Spring Valley, and Harmony.

Greenleafton is located 11 miles southwest of Preston, and 16 miles southeast of Spring Valley. Greenleafton is 13 miles west-northwest of Harmony. Canfield Creek flows through the area.

Greenleafton is located within ZIP code 55965 based in Preston. A post office previously operated in the community from 1874 to 1905.

== Geography ==
The area features a Karst topography. Nearby Forestville Mystery Cave State Park features the state's longest publicly accessible cave system. Caves even closer to the town have been discovered and are opening up for exploration.

== History ==
Greenleafton was first settled by Dutch immigrants, including Arend Jan Nagel, who moved westward from Alto, Wisconsin, seeking inexpensive land. Like him, many of the first settlers had originally come from the Achterhoek in the eastern Netherlands and from neighboring areas in Germany. These settlers established the Greenleafton Reformed Church in 1867. Norwegians and other groups also settled the area.

The name Greenleafton is in honor of Mary Greenleaf, a benefactor of the former Dutch Reformed Church, now the Reformed Church in America, established there.
