= 1928 Minnesota lieutenant gubernatorial election =

Minnesota lieutenant gubernatorial election, 1928
- November 6, 1928
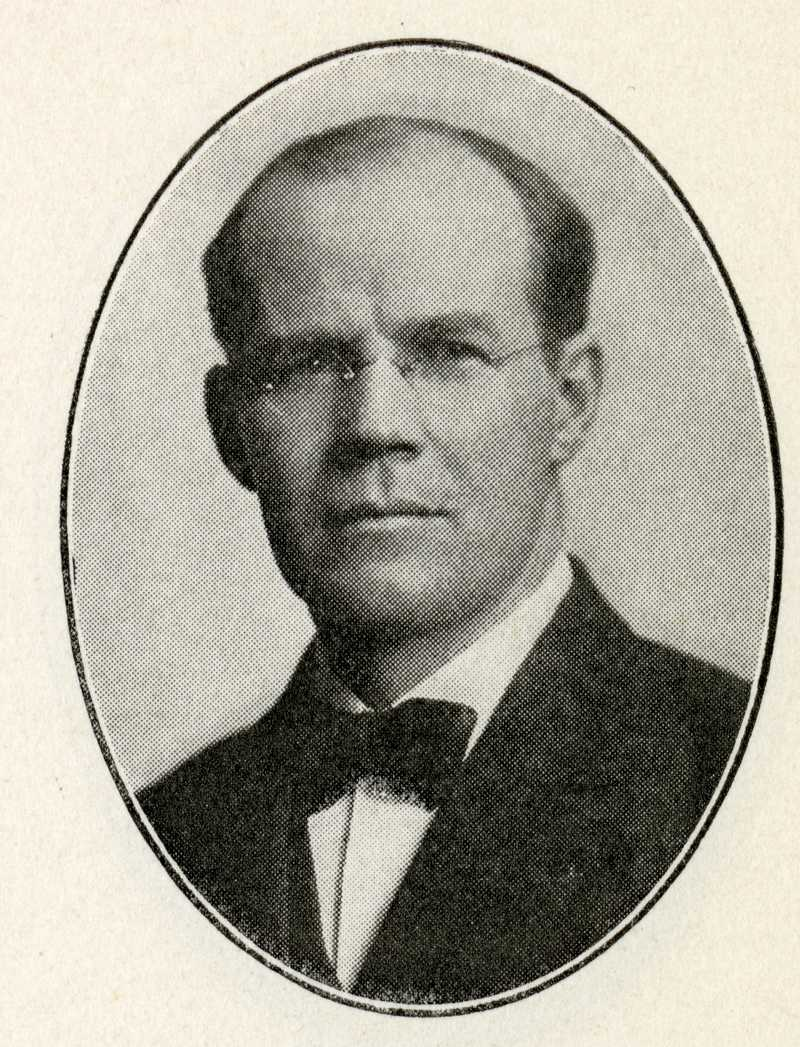

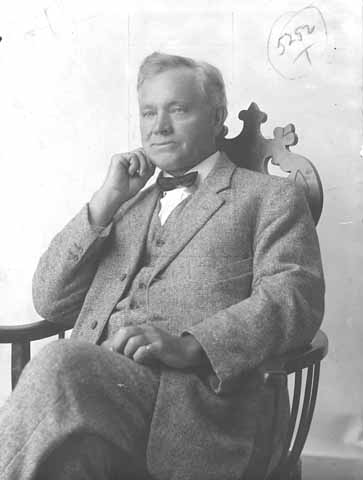

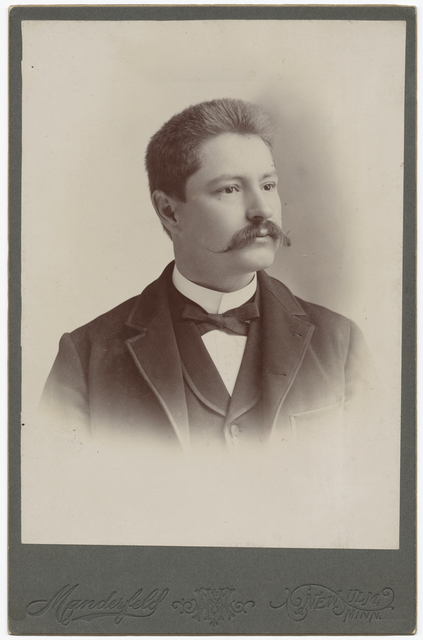
| Nominee | William I. Nolan | Thomas J. Meighen | Fred Pfaender |
| Party | Republican | Farmer–Labor | Democratic |
| Popular vote | 526,413 | 235,133 | 180,449 |
| Percentage | 55.88% | 24.96% | 19.16% |
Lieutenant Governor before election
William I. Nolan
Republican
Elected Lieutenant Governor
William I. Nolan
Republican

The 1928 Minnesota lieutenant gubernatorial election took place on November 6, 1928. Incumbent Lieutenant Governor William I. Nolan of the Republican Party of Minnesota defeated Minnesota Farmer–Labor Party challenger Thomas J. Meighen and Minnesota Democratic Party candidate Fred Pfaender.

== Results ==
1928 lieutenant gubernatorial election, Minnesota
| Party | Candidate | Votes | % | ±% |
|---|---|---|---|---|
| Republican | William I. Nolan (incumbent) | 526,413 | 55.88% | −0.48% |
| Farmer–Labor | Thomas J. Meighen | 235,133 | 24.96% | −10.66% |
| Democratic | Fred Pfaender | 180,449 | 19.16% | +11.14% |
| Majority | | 291,280 | 30.92% | |
| Turnout | | 941,995 | | |
| Republican hold | | Swing | | |
