= John Pillsbury Snyder =

American businessman and politician

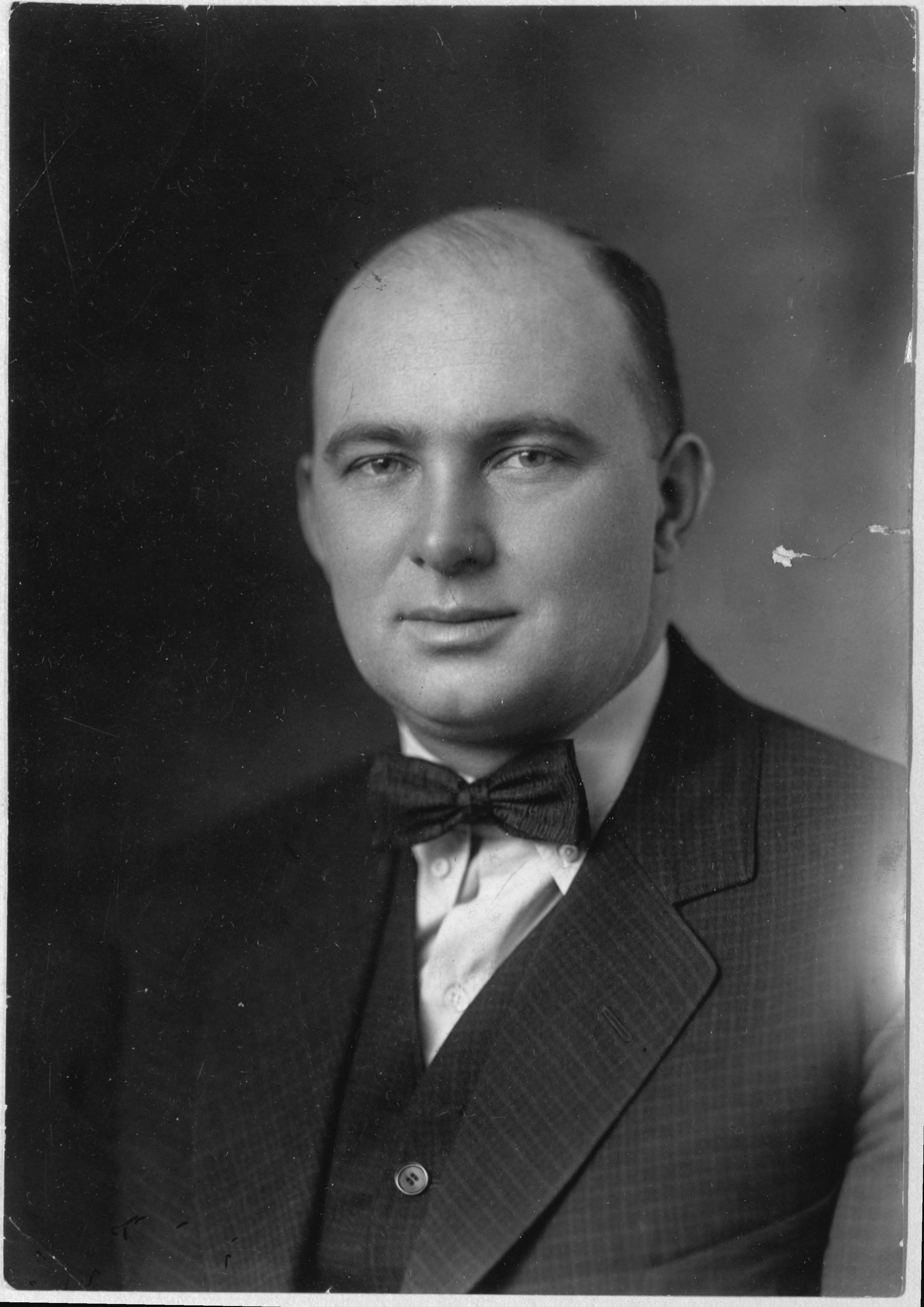
John P. Snyder

John Pillsbury Snyder (January 8, 1888 – July 22, 1959) was an American businessman and politician.

Snyder was born in Minneapolis, Minnesota. His grandfather was John S. Pillsbury. He went to the public schools and to the University of Minnesota. Snyder married Nelle Stevenson Snyder. Returning from their honeymoon, Snyder and his wife were two of the survivors of the sinking of the RMS Titanic in 1912. He served in the United States Army and was commissioned major. Snyder was involved with the banking and automobile businesses. Snyder served in the Minnesota House of Representatives in 1927 and 1928. Snyder died suddenly from a heart attack while playing golf at the Woodhill Golf Course in Orono, Minnesota. His father was Frederic Beal Snyder who also served in the Minnesota Legislature.
