= Frederic Beal Snyder =

American politician

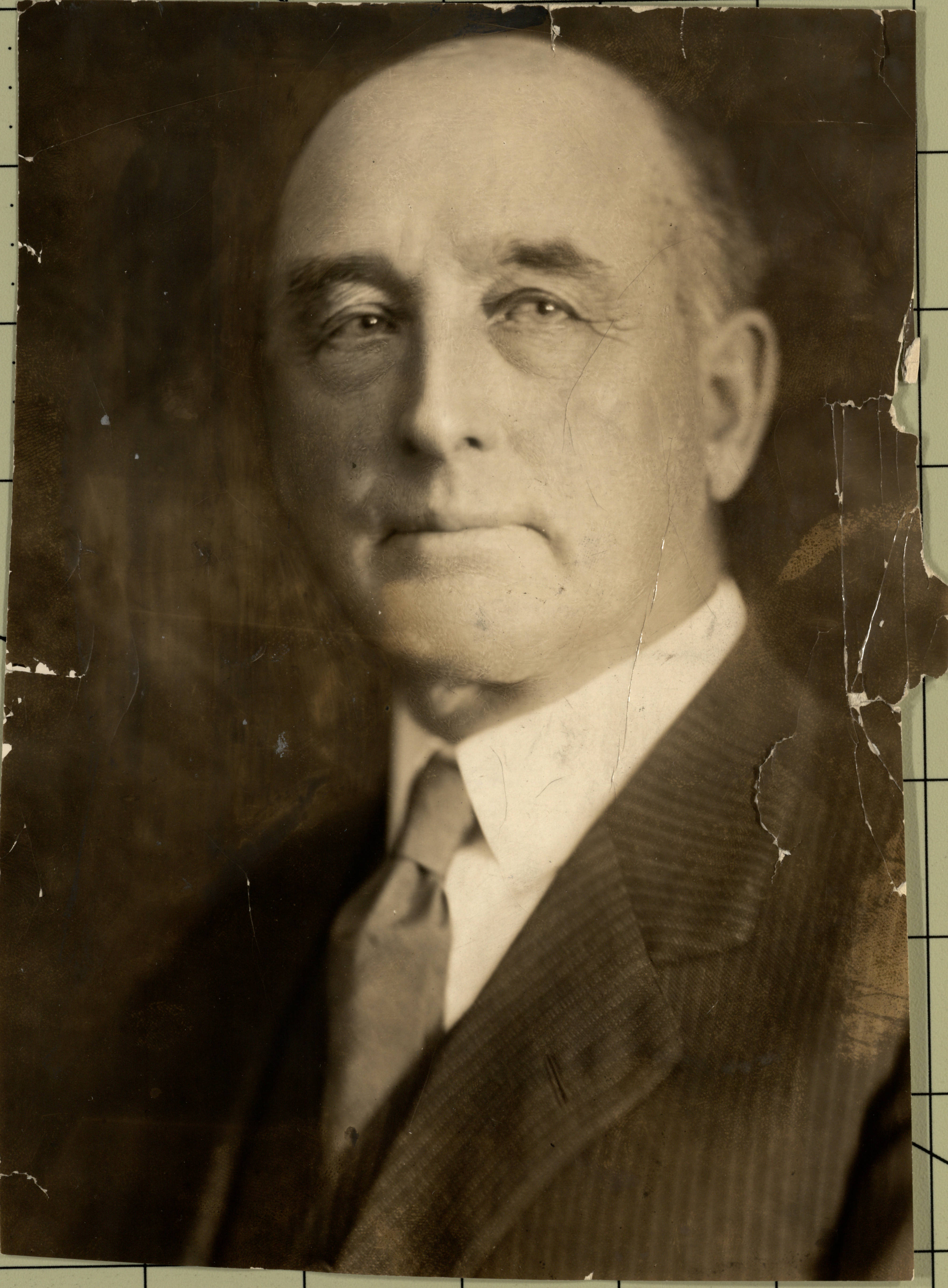
Frederic Beal Snyder

Frederic Beal Snyder (February 21, 1859 – February 14, 1951) was an American politician and lawyer.

Snyder was born in Minneapolis, Minnesota. He went to the Minneapolis public schools. In 1881, Snyder graduated from the University of Minnesota. He was admitted to the Minnesota bar in 1882 and practices law in Minneapolis. His wife Susan Pillsbury Snyder was the daughter of Minnesota Governor John S. Pillsbury and their son was John Pillsbury Snyder. Susan Snyder died in 1891 and Snyder later remarried. Snyder served on the Minneapolis City Council from 1892 to 1896 and was president of the city council. He served in the Minnesota House of Representatives in 1897 and 1898. He also served in the Minnesota Senate from 1899 to 1902 and was a Republican. He served on the University of Minnesota Board of Regents from 1912 to 1951 and was president of the board of regents. Snyder died from pneumonia in Minneapolis, Minnesota.
