= 1879 Minnesota gubernatorial election =

- November 4, 1879
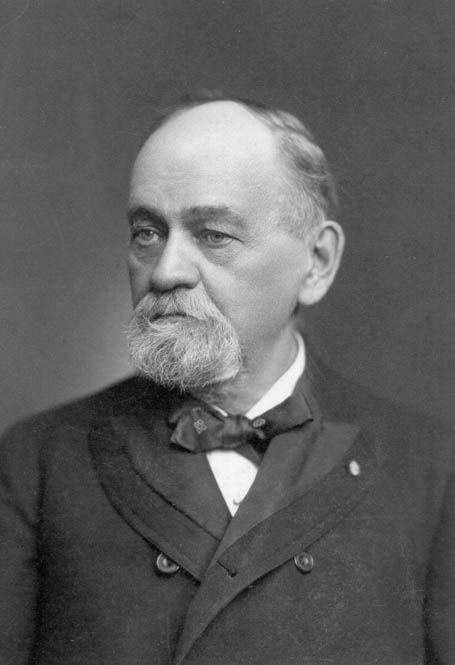

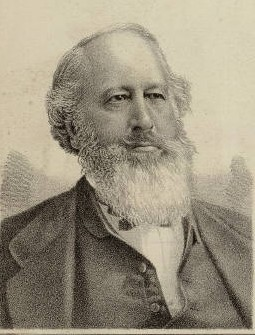
| Nominee | John S. Pillsbury | Edmund Rice |
| Party | Republican | Democratic |
| Popular vote | 57,524 | 41,524 |
| Percentage | 54.18% | 39.11% |
- County results Pillsbury: 50–60% 60–70% 70–80% 80–90% 90–100% Rice: 40–50% 50–60% 60–70% 70–80% No data/vote
Governor before election
John S. Pillsbury
Republican
Elected Governor
John S. Pillsbury
Republican

The 1879 Minnesota gubernatorial election was held on November 4, 1879, to elect the governor of Minnesota. Incumbent John S. Pillsbury was reelected to a third term.

Ara Barton was the initial Greenback nominee, but he declined the nomination and was replaced by William Meighen.

== Candidates ==
- William Meighen, former state senator, candidate in 1877 (Greenback)
- John S. Pillsbury, incumbent (Republican)
- Edmund Rice, member of the Minnesota House of Representatives (Democrat)
- Rev. Dr. William W. Satterlee, pastor (Prohibition)

== Campaigns ==
The Republican State Convention was held on September 2, 1879. Pillsbury was re-nominated on the first, technically informal, ballot. He became the first governor of Minnesota nominated for a third term. Other primary candidates were James Wakefield, Lucius Frederick Hubbard, Gordon E. Cole, and William W. Billson. Before the convention, it was generally believed that Wakefield would be nominated.

On September 25, 1879, the Democratic State Convention was held. On the first ballot, Edmund Rice was nominated, with 212 votes to runner-up William W. McNair's 202. Other votes were cast for Richard W. Johnson, Eugene M. Wilson, and Henry R. Wells. All opposition dropped out following Rice's first place position, making his nomination, if only on a technicality, unanimous.

== Results ==
Minnesota gubernatorial election, 1879
| Party | Candidate | Votes | % |
|---|---|---|---|
| Republican | John S. Pillsbury (incumbent) | 57,524 | 54.18 |
| Democratic | Edmund Rice | 41,524 | 39.11 |
| Greenback | William Meighen | 4,264 | 4.02 |
| Prohibition | William W. Satterlee | 2,868 | 2.70 |
| Total votes | | 106,180 | 100.00 |
| Republican hold | | | |
