= Forestville Township, Fillmore County, Minnesota =

Forestville Township, Minnesota
- Township
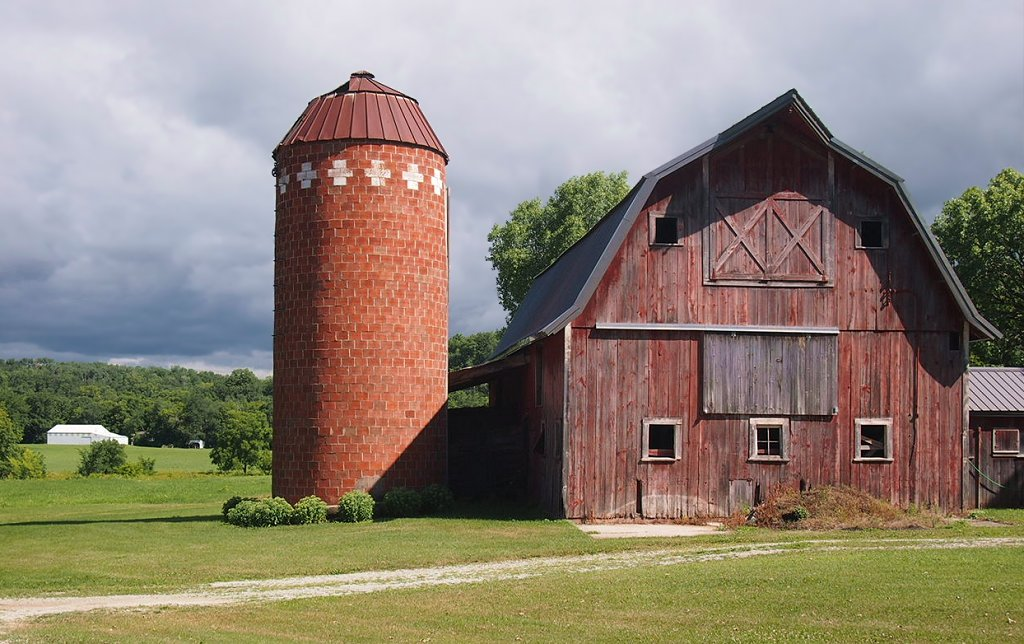
- Farms in Forestville Township

- Location within the state of Minnesota
- Coordinates: 43°37′18″N 92°16′58″W
- Country: United States
- State: Minnesota
- County: Fillmore

Area
  - Total: 36.1 sq mi (93.6 km^{2})
  - Land: 36.1 sq mi (93.6 km^{2})
  - Water: 0 sq mi (0.0 km^{2})
- Elevation: 1,250 ft (381 m)

Population (2000)
  - Total: 386
  - Density: 11/sq mi (4.1/km^{2})
- Time zone: UTC-6 (Central (CST))
  - Summer (DST): UTC-5 (CDT)
- FIPS code: 27-21860
- GNIS feature ID: 0664197

Forestville Township is a township in Fillmore County, Minnesota, United States. The population was 356 as of the 2010 census. It contains historic Forestville, which is now a living history museum within Forestville/Mystery Cave State Park.

Forestville Township was organized in 1855, and named for Forest Henry, an early settler.

== Geography ==
According to the United States Census Bureau, the township has a total area of 36.2 square miles (94 km^{2}), all land.

== Demographics ==
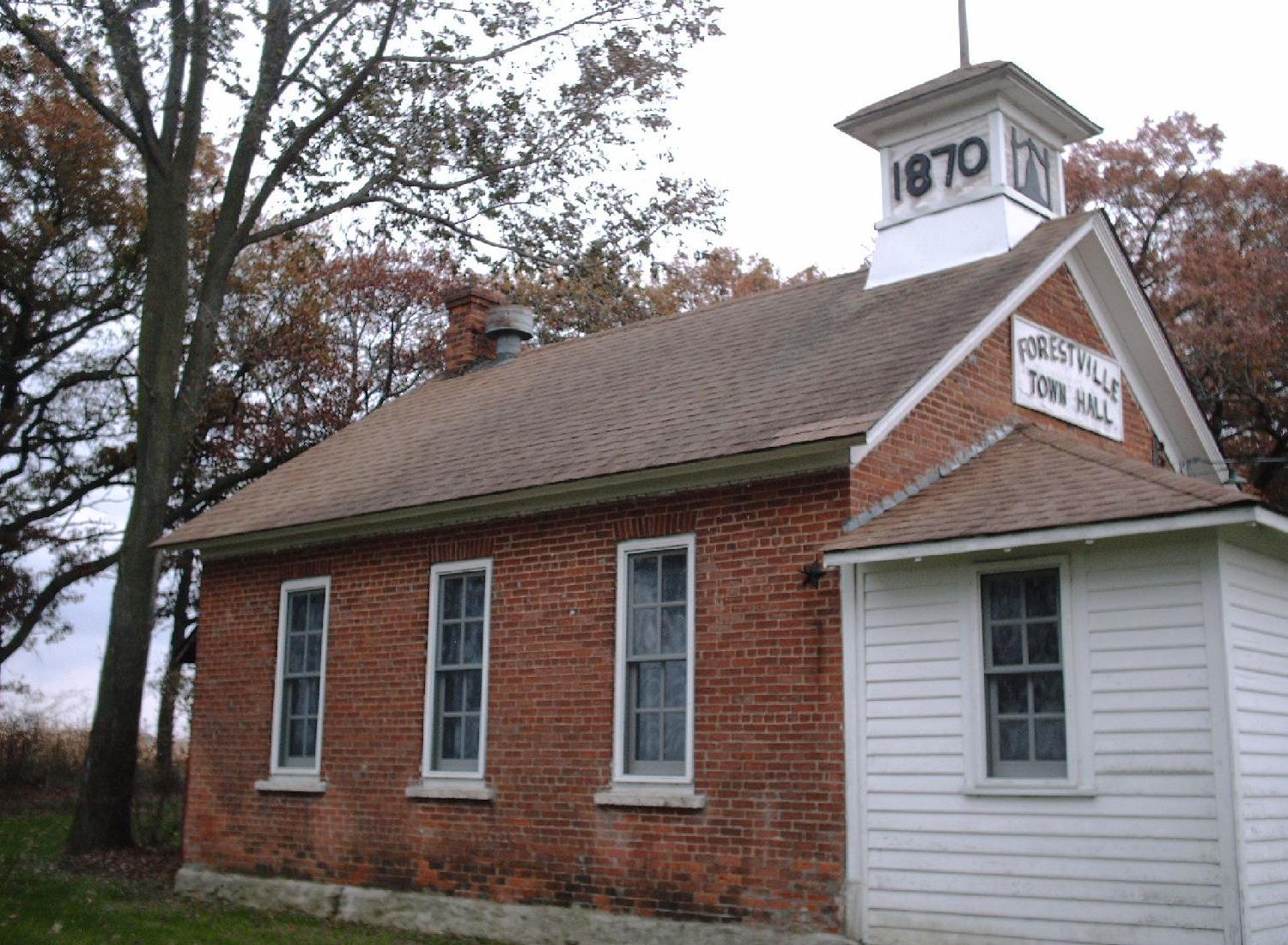
Forestville Town Hall

As of the census of 2000, there were 386 people, 150 households, and 115 families residing in the township. The population density was 10.7 inhabitants per square mile (4.1/km^{2}). There were 164 housing units at an average density of 4.5 per square mile (1.7/km^{2}). The racial makeup of the township was 99.48% White, and 0.52% from two or more races. Hispanic or Latino of any race were 1.30% of the population.

There were 150 households, out of which 29.3% had children under the age of 18 living with them, 71.3% were married couples living together, 3.3% had a female householder with no husband present, and 22.7% were non-families. 20.7% of all households were made up of individuals, and 6.0% had someone living alone who was 65 years of age or older. The average household size was 2.57 and the average family size was 2.98.

In the township the population was spread out, with 26.2% under the age of 18, 7.0% from 18 to 24, 25.9% from 25 to 44, 25.4% from 45 to 64, and 15.5% who were 65 years of age or older. The median age was 40 years. For every 100 females, there were 114.4 males. For every 100 females age 18 and over, there were 115.9 males.

The median income for a household in the township was $38,125, and the median income for a family was $50,500. Males had a median income of $27,333 versus $25,750 for females. The per capita income for the township was $17,559. About 10.3% of families and 12.6% of the population were below the poverty line, including 17.9% of those under age 18 and none of those age 65 or over.
