= 1877 Minnesota gubernatorial election =

- November 6, 1877
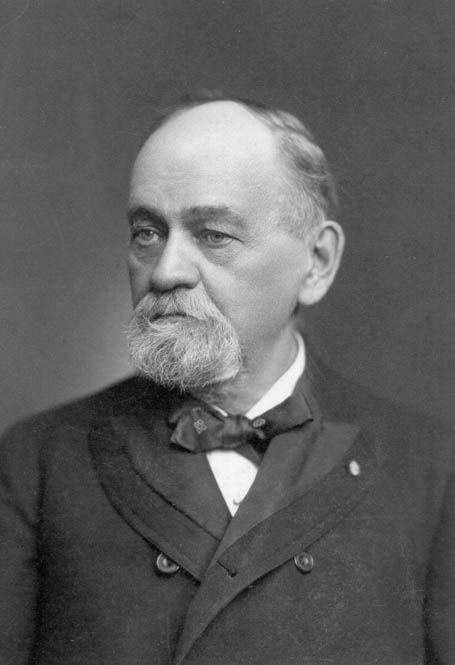

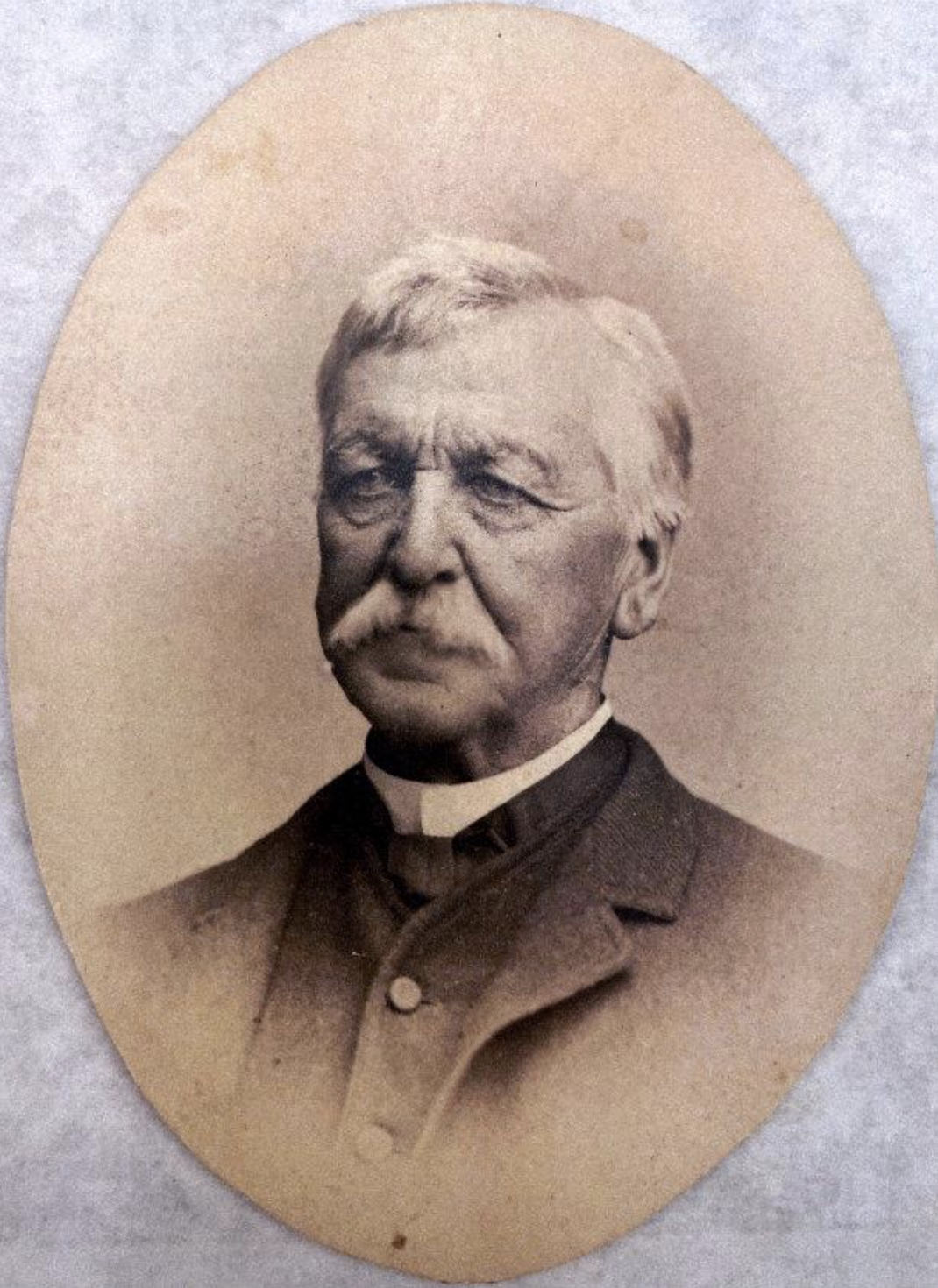
Nominee	John S. Pillsbury	William L. Banning
Party	Republican	Democratic
Popular vote	57,071	39,147
Percentage	57.05%	39.13%
- County results Pillsbury: 50–60% 60–70% 70–80% 80–90% 90–100% Banning: 50–60% 60–70% 70–80% Unknown/no vote
Governor before election
John S. Pillsbury
Republican
Elected Governor
John S. Pillsbury
Republican

The 1877 Minnesota gubernatorial election was held on November 6, 1877, to elect the governor of Minnesota. Incumbent John S. Pillsbury was reelected to a second term.

== Candidates ==
- William L. Banning, former member of the Minnesota House of Representatives (Democrat)
- William Meighen, state senator (Greenback)
- John S. Pillsbury, incumbent (Republican)
- Rev. Austin Willey, pastor (Prohibition)

== Campaigns ==
The Democratic State Convention began on October 2, 1877. Edmund Rice was originally thought to be the nominee. However, by the end of the convention it was considered "several hours of wrangling and confusion". One dividing issue in the party was hard money and soft money factions. The eventual nominee, William L. Banning, was in favor of a soft-money policy. Banning was elected in a landslide against Rice and William Meighen, who then ran for the Greenback Party.

Also on September 29, the Republican State Convention was held. Pillsbury was renominated without issue.

== Results ==
Minnesota gubernatorial election, 1877
Party	Candidate	Votes	%
Republican	John S. Pillsbury (incumbent)	57,071	57.05
Democratic	William L. Banning	39,147	39.13
Greenback	William Meighen	2,396	2.40
Prohibition	Austin Willey	1,421	1.42
Total votes		100,035	100
Republican hold			
