= Ostrander, Minnesota =

City in Minnesota, United States

Ostrander
- City
- Location of Ostrander, Minnesota
- Coordinates: 43°36′49″N 92°25′35″W
- Country: United States
- State: Minnesota
- County: Fillmore

Area
  - Total: 0.47 sq mi (1.23 km^{2})
  - Land: 0.47 sq mi (1.23 km^{2})
  - Water: 0 sq mi (0.00 km^{2})
- Elevation: 1,345 ft (410 m)

Population (2020)
  - Total: 231
  - Density: 486.4/sq mi (187.81/km^{2})
- Time zone: UTC-6 (Central (CST))
  - Summer (DST): UTC-5 (CDT)
- ZIP code: 55961
- Area code: 507
- FIPS code: 27-49030
- GNIS feature ID: 2396101
- Website: https://www.cityofostrander.com/

Ostrander (/oʊstˈrændɜːr/ ohst-RAND-ər) is a city in Fillmore County, Minnesota, United States. As of the 2020 census, Ostrander had a population of 231.

== History ==
Ostrander was platted in 1890. A post office has been in operation at Ostrander since 1891. The city was named after William and Charles Ostrander

== Geography ==
According to the United States Census Bureau, the city has a total area of 0.48 square miles (1.24 km^{2}), all land.

== Demographics ==
Historical population
Census	Pop.	Note	%±
1920	206		—
1930	151		−26.7%
1940	163		7.9%
1950	191		17.2%
1960	216		13.1%
1970	268		24.1%
1980	293		9.3%
1990	276		−5.8%
2000	212		−23.2%
2010	254		19.8%
2020	231		−9.1%
U.S. Decennial Census

=== 2010 census ===
As of the census of 2010, there were 254 people, 111 households, and 59 families living in the city. The population density was 529.2 inhabitants per square mile (204.3/km^{2}). There were 117 housing units at an average density of 243.8 per square mile (94.1/km^{2}). The racial makeup of the city was 98.0% White and 2.0% from two or more races. Hispanic or Latino of any race were 0.8% of the population.

There were 111 households, of which 26.1% had children under the age of 18 living with them, 44.1% were married couples living together, 8.1% had a female householder with no husband present, 0.9% had a male householder with no wife present, and 46.8% were non-families. 41.4% of all households were made up of individuals, and 15.3% had someone living alone who was 65 years of age or older. The average household size was 2.06 and the average family size was 2.83.

The median age in the city was 46.8 years. 20.9% of residents were under the age of 18; 3.9% were between the ages of 18 and 24; 23.6% were from 25 to 44; 25.6% were from 45 to 64; and 26% were 65 years of age or older. The gender makeup of the city was 48.8% male and 51.2% female.

=== 2000 census ===
As of the census of 2000, there were 212 people, 100 households, and 65 families living in the city. The population density was 604.1 inhabitants per square mile (233.2/km^{2}). There were 109 housing units at an average density of 310.6 per square mile (119.9/km^{2}). The racial makeup of the city was 100.00% White. Hispanic or Latino of any race were 0.47% of the population.

There were 100 households, out of which 23.0% had children under the age of 18 living with them, 55.0% were married couples living together, 5.0% had a female householder with no husband present, and 35.0% were non-families. 32.0% of all households were made up of individuals, and 26.0% had someone living alone who was 65 years of age or older. The average household size was 2.12 and the average family size was 2.63.

In the city, the population was spread out, with 18.9% under the age of 18, 4.7% from 18 to 24, 20.3% from 25 to 44, 23.1% from 45 to 64, and 33.0% who were 65 years of age or older. The median age was 48 years. For every 100 females, there were 98.1 males. For every 100 females age 18 and over, there were 87.0 males.

The median income for a household in the city was $41,875, and the median income for a family was $57,500. Males had a median income of $40,893 versus $23,750 for females. The per capita income for the city was $20,214. None of the families and 5.0% of the population were living below the poverty line, including no under eighteens and 14.7% of those over 64.
