= Lucius Frederick Hubbard =

American politician (1836–1913)

Brigadier General Lucius Frederick Hubbard
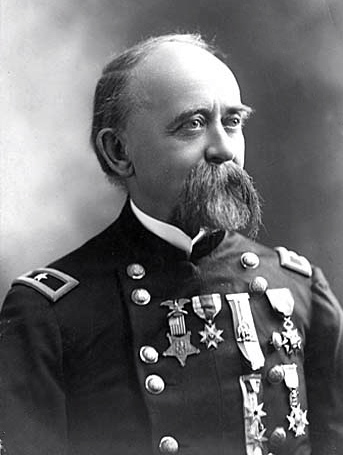

9th Governor of Minnesota
- In office January 10, 1882 – January 5, 1887
- Lieutenant: Charles A. Gilman
- Preceded by: John S. Pillsbury
- Succeeded by: Andrew Ryan McGill

Personal details
- Born: January 26, 1836 Troy, New York, U.S.
- Died: February 5, 1913 (aged 77) Minneapolis, Minnesota, U.S.
- Resting place: Oakwood Cemetery, Red Wing, Minnesota, U.S.
- Party: Republican
- Spouse: Amelia Thomas

Military service
- Allegiance: United States of America
- Branch/service: Union Army
- Years of service: 1861 - 1865
- Rank: Colonel; Brevet Brigadier General
- Unit: 5th Minnesota Infantry Regiment
- Commands: 5th Minnesota Infantry Regiment

Lucius Frederick Hubbard (January 26, 1836 – February 5, 1913) was an American politician. As a Republican Hubbard served as the ninth governor of Minnesota from January 10, 1882, to January 5, 1887. He also served as an officer in the Union Army during the American Civil War.

== Early life ==
Born in 1836 in Troy, New York, and orphaned at ten, Hubbard first worked as a tinsmith in the east and then in Chicago. At age 21 he moved to Red Wing, Minnesota with an old hand-operated printing press and some type; within two months, he was publisher and editor of the Red Wing Republican, in which he promoted his strong political views. His local rival was William J. Colvill, editor of the Democrat-leaning Red Wing Sentinel.

== Career ==
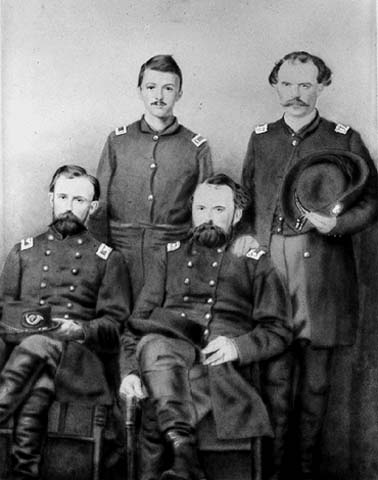
Hubbard (front left) with members of the 5th Minnesota Regiment in 1862

During the American Civil War, Hubbard joined the Union Army in 1861 and enlisted as a private in the 5th Minnesota Volunteer Infantry. Hubbard took part in the siege of Corinth, the siege of Vicksburg, the battle of Nashville and the battle of Fort Blakeley. Hubbard eventually rose to the rank of Colonel of the 5th Minnesota Regiment and, for his services at Nashville, was made a brevet brigadier general on December 16, 1864.

After the war's end Hubbard returned to Red Wing, where he simultaneously engaged in milling and railroading. He would become a wealthy grain merchant, and would be a buyer of the failing Midland Railroad in 1878. The line itself would be bought from Hubbard, increasing his fortune.

He won election to the Minnesota State Senate, completing his second term in 1875. A partner in the Midland Railroad, he also presided over operations of the Cannon Valley Railway until his gubernatorial election in 1881. In 1879, he was a primary contender for the Republican nomination. He lost to incumbent John S. Pillsbury. He would run a second time in 1881. After coming in first place in the first informal ballot, and then the first formal ballot by an even larger margin, a motion was passed to declare him the unanimous winner of the Republican primary. His nomination was met with wild enthusiasm. He would win the gubernatorial election with 61.59% of the vote.

== As governor ==
Hubbard would win a landslide victory in the 1881 Minnesota gubernatorial election.

Hubbard forcefully urged government intervention in public health, corrections, charities, railroads, agriculture, and commerce, and the legislature complied by increasing the state's regulatory and licensing powers. In 1885, he championed an act to build the Minnesota State Public School for Dependent and Neglected Children in the city of Owatonna. His second term lasted three years, in accordance with a state constitutional amendment to have state, county, and federal biennial elections all coincide.

As governor, Hubbard had the power of the pardon. He would grant 215 pardons in his two terms, and received many appeals from convicts to be pardoned. Uniquely, he would sometimes pardon convicts for mostly serious crimes, including violent ones. He was also known to sometimes investigate cases himself.

== Later life ==
He was a member of the Military Order of Foreign Wars, Military Order of the Loyal Legion of the United States and the Sons of the American Revolution.

In 1887 Hubbard took over operations of yet another railroad. When America declared war against Spain in 1898, President William McKinley appointed the 62-year-old as a brigadier general of volunteers and asked him to oversee a military post in Florida. Two years later, Hubbard moved to St. Paul and then to Minneapolis, where he died at 77. He is buried in Oakwood Cemetery in Red Wing.

Hubbard County, Minnesota is named after him.

== See also ==
- List of American Civil War brevet generals (Union)

Party political offices
Preceded by John S. Pillsbury	Republican nominee for Governor of Minnesota; 1881, 1883	Succeeded by Andrew Ryan McGill
Political offices
Preceded by John S. Pillsbury	Governor of Minnesota; 1882–1887	Succeeded by Andrew Ryan McGill
