= Forestville Mystery Cave State Park =

State park in Minnesota, United States

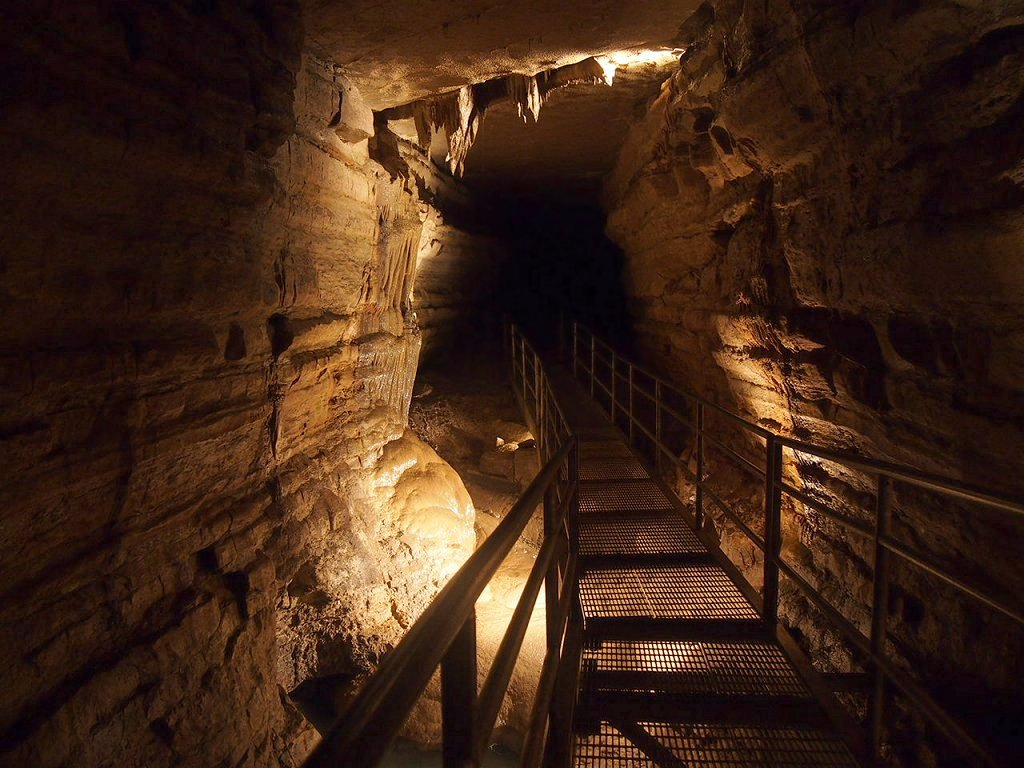
- A passage in Mystery Cave

- Location within Minnesota Location within the United States
- Location: Fillmore, Minnesota, United States
- Coordinates: 43°38′23″N 92°12′43″W
- Area: 3,170 acres (12.8 km^{2})
- Elevation: 1,266 ft (386 m)
- Established: 1941
- Governing body: Minnesota Department of Natural Resources

- Forestville Townsite--Meighan Store
- U.S. National Register of Historic Places
- U.S. Historic district
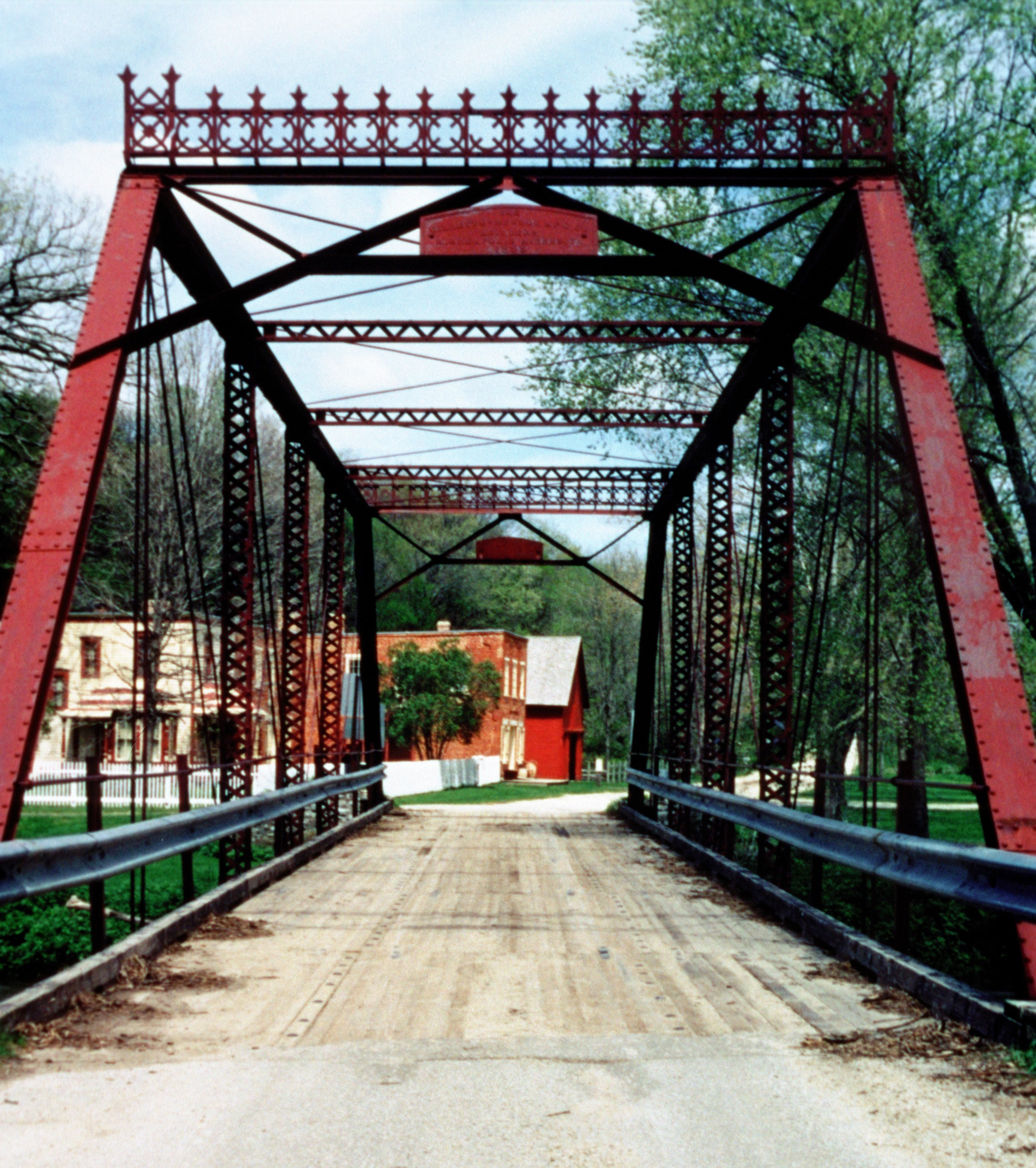
- Historic bridge to Forestville

- Location within Minnesota Location within the United States
- Coordinates: 43°38′34″N 92°12′53″W
- Architect: Robert Foster; Felix Meighen
- NRHP reference No.: 73000976
- Added to NRHP: April 13, 1973

Forestville Mystery Cave State Park is a state park in Minnesota. It contains the village of Forestville, which has been restored to a 19th-century appearance. The Minnesota Historical Society operates it as a historic site. Below ground the park contains Mystery Cave, the state's longest cave, which is open to the public. The park is between Spring Valley and Preston, Minnesota.

== Mystery Cave ==
The park is in the Driftless Area, noted for its karst topography, which includes sinkholes and caves. The park is about 5 miles (8.0 km) from Mystery Cave and occupies approximately 3,170 acres (12.8 km^{2}), with camping, interpretive programs, and hiking, horseback, cross-country skiing trails, cold water streams and excellent trout fishing. The cave includes stalactites, stalagmites, and underground pools, and is a constant 48 °F (9 °C). It has over 13 miles (21 km) of passages in two rock layers and is being resurveyed and remapped by volunteers.

== Geologic history ==
About 450 million years ago sedimentary rocks were deposited as the land was intermittently covered by shallow seas that transgressed and regressed. Over the eons the alternating deposits of mud and oceanic debris were compressed to form limestone, shale and sandstone layers. Today these layers are 1,300 feet (400 m) above sea level. Within the last 500,000 to 1,000,000 years, flood waters dissolved along fractures in the limestone bedrock to create most of the cave. Acidic rainwater also sculpted the land above and around the cave, creating thousands of sinkholes and other karst features in the surrounding county.

== Wildlife ==
The park contains a range of wildlife, from relatively rare species such as glacial snails and timber rattlesnakes to common species such as deer, raccoon, beaver, two species of fox, mink, opossum, woodchuck, and four species of squirrels. Coyotes howl at dusk. Numerous reptiles and amphibians are present. At least 175 species of birds have also been recorded. The South Branch of the Root River contains brown trout, brook trout, and rainbow trout.

== Historic Forestville ==
The Minnesota Historical Society operates Historic Forestville as a living museum set in 1899. Costumed interpreters portray Forestville residents and go about daily activities in the general store, house, kitchen, farm, and barn.

Forestville was a rural trade center in the 1800s that declined after the railroad was built elsewhere in 1868. Felix Meighen, son of one of the town's founders, owned the entire village by 1889, including the general store, and the local residents worked on his property for housing and credit in the store. The land was inherited by his son, Thomas Meighen, who wished for the land to be turned into a state park after his death in 1936.

Admission to Historic Forestville is separate from the caves. Historic Forestville is open from May through October.

The historic bridge to Forestville has been closed in 2023 due to structural failure.
