= Forestville, Minnesota =

Ghost town in Minnesota

- Forestville Townsite--Meighan Store
- U.S. National Register of Historic Places
- U.S. Historic district
- Minnesota State Register of Historic Places
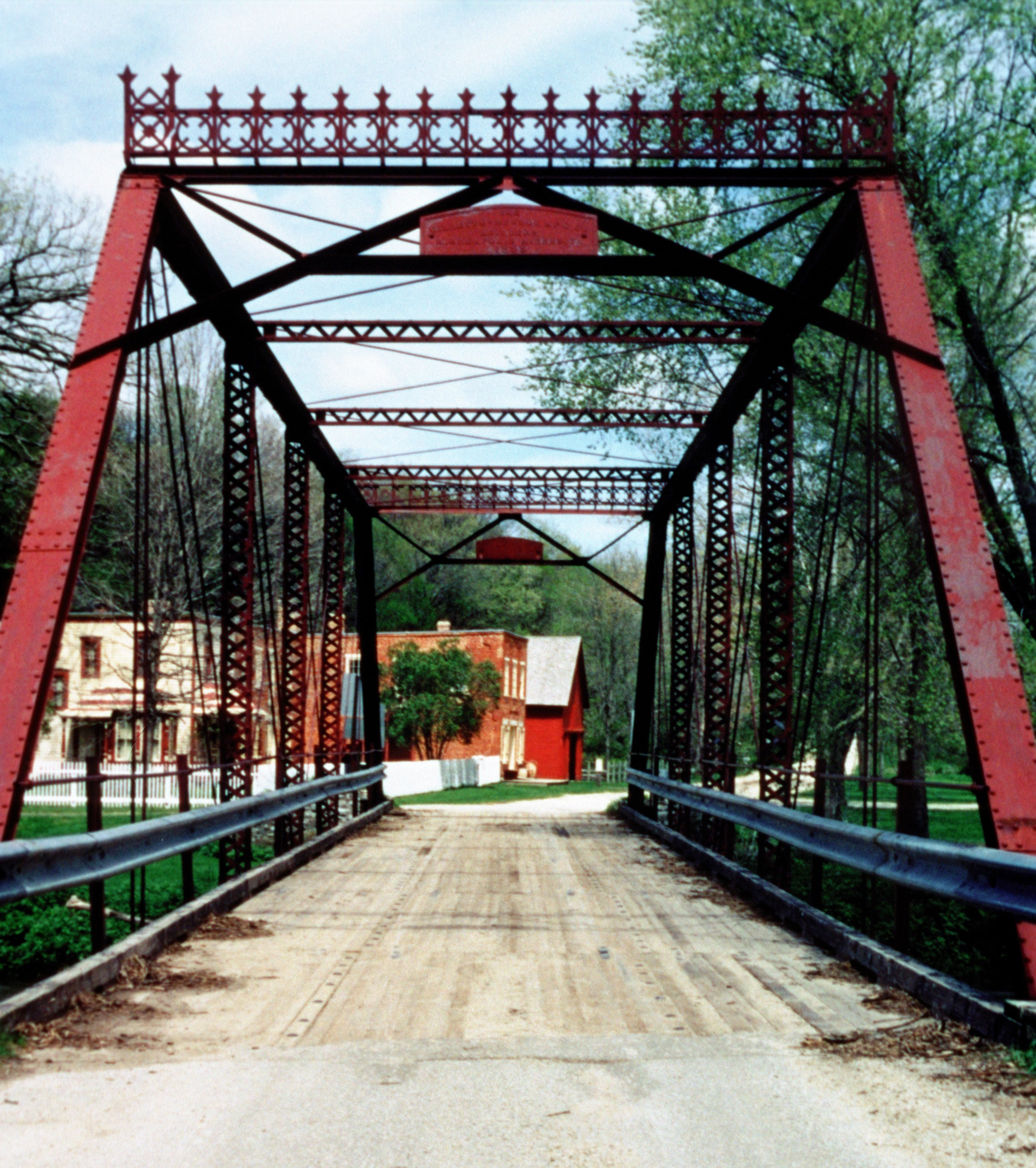
- Bridge to historic Forestville, Minnesota

- Location within Minnesota Location within the United States
- Nearest city: Preston, Minnesota
- Coordinates: 43°38′34.23″N 92°12′53.37″W
- Area: 425 acres (172 ha)
- Architect: Foster, Robert; Meighen, Felix
- Architectural style: Federal
- NRHP reference No.: 73000976
- Added to NRHP: April 13, 1973

Forestville is a ghost town in section 13 of Forestville Township in Fillmore County, Minnesota, United States. The nearest communities are Wykoff, to the northwest, and Preston, to the northeast.

== History ==
The town of Forestville was settled in 1852 and organized in 1855, named in honor of Forest Henry, the first probate judge of Fillmore County, who had settled there in 1854. The town was incorporated in 1891 and had a post office from 1855 until 1902.

Brothers-in-law William and Felix Meighen were some of the first settlers. Felix saw the need for a general store and stocked it with $700 worth of goods from Galena in October 1853. As more people arrived in Minnesota territory, the town gained a blacksmith shop, a cabinet shop, saw mills, farms, stores, grist mills, and hotels.

The town's population began to drop after the railroad bypassed Forestville in 1868; many families began leaving for more prosperous areas. By 1880, the town's population was only 55 and most businesses had closed. As families left town, the Meighen family began buying up cheap property, and by 1889, they owned the entire town and its surrounding area. By the early 1900s, even the Meighen family had left Forestville, and their general store's doors were closed in 1910, marking the end of the town's life.

== State Park ==
In 1949 the Minnesota State Legislature authorized the creation of Forestville State Park, with the intent to preserve what remained of the abandoned townsite. Mystery Cave was added to the state park in 1987.

Today Historic Forestville is operated as a historic site of the Minnesota Historical Society.

Historical population
Census	Pop.	Note	%±
1880	55		—
U.S. Decennial Census
