= Tollef Fladeland =

American politician (1829 – 1904)

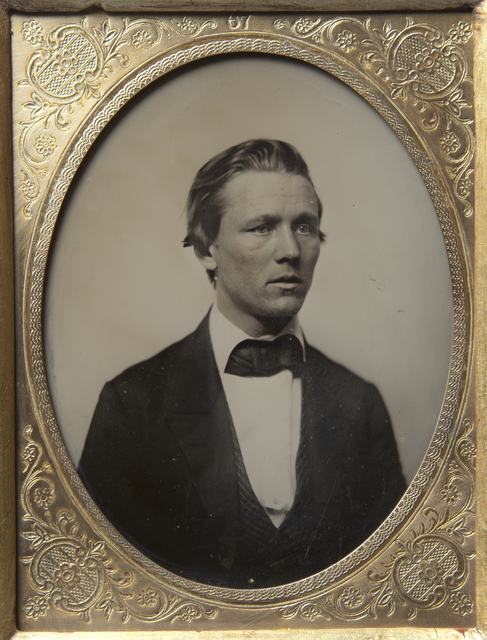
- Fladeland c. 1858

Member of the 9th District of the Minnesota House of Representatives
- In office December 2, 1857 – December 6, 1859
- Governor: Samuel Medary; Charles L. Chase

Register of Deeds of Fillmore County, Minnesota
- In office 1872–1879

Personal details
- Born: January 9, 1829 Kviteseid, Norway
- Died: October 27, 1904 (aged 75) Jamestown, North Dakota, U.S.
- Resting place: North Dakota State Hospital Cemetery; Jamestown, North Dakota, U.S.
- Other political affiliations: Democrat

Military service
- Allegiance: United States of America
- Branch/service: Union Army
- Years of service: 1865 – 1865
- Rank: Private
- Unit: 7th Minnesota Infantry Regiment
- Battles/wars: American Civil War

Tollef Gunderson Fladeland (January 9, 1829 – October 27, 1904), sometimes abbreviated as T.G. Fladeland or T.J. Fladeland, was a Norwegian American merchant, lawyer, soldier, and politician who assisted in the early settlement of Rushford, Minnesota. During his political career Fladeland served as single term in the Minnesota House of Representatives from December 2, 1857, to December 6, 1859, he later served as the Register of Deeds of Fillmore County, Minnesota. Fladeland ran an unsuccessful campaign for the office of Minnesota Secretary of State during the 1869 Minnesota Secretary of State election where he ultimately lost to Swedish-American politician Hans Mattson.

== Early life and career ==
Fladeland was born on January 9, 1829, in Kviteseid, Norway. Some sources sometimes mistranslate Tollef's name as Thorbjoren. In 1843 Fladeland emigrated to the United States and settled in Dane County, Wisconsin at the Koshkonong Settlement near Lake Koshkonong. Fladeland would work in Hannibal, Missouri and Cleveland, Ohio as a merchant before moving to New York City where he worked as an immigration agent for Ole Bull, a Norwegian musician and the founder of Oleona, Pennsylvania, a Norwegian utopian colony. Fladeland eventually moved to Minnesota Territory in 1856 where he helped establish the city of Rushford, Minnesota. Fladeland was one of several merchants in Rushford where he establish a small dry goods store.

=== Political career ===
Fladeland began his political career in 1857 when he ran for a seat in the Minnesota House of Representatives as a representative of Fillmore County. Fladeland won the election on October 13, 1857, and served a single term in the Minnesota House from December 2, 1857, to December 6, 1859. Fillmore County at the time was part of Minnesota's 9th Senate district which was represented by Samuel Hull and John R. Jones in the Minnesota Senate while Fladeland, Theodore Jackson Eames, Isaac DeCow, Major J. Foster, Henry Kibler, and James M. Graham represented the 9th District in the Minnesota House.

Beginning in 1869 Fladeland ran as a Democrat in the 1869 Minnesota Secretary of State election and won 44.10% of the vote or 24,188 votes. Fladeland ultimately lost to Republican candidate Hans Mattson. Following his political campaigning Fladeland served as the Register of Deeds of Fillmore County from 1872 to 1879.

=== Military service ===
During the American Civil War Fladeland served in the 7th Minnesota Infantry Regiment as a Private.

== Later life ==
Following his political career Fladeland moved to Fargo, North Dakota where he opened a land settlement office for Norwegian emigrants. Fladeland died on October 27, 1904 in Jamestown, North Dakota.
