= John S. Pillsbury =

American politician (1827–1901)

John Sargent Pillsbury
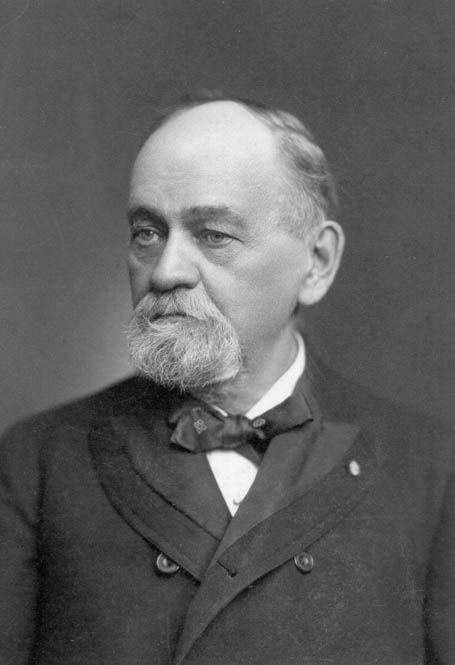

8th Governor of Minnesota
- In office January 7, 1876 – January 10, 1882
- Lieutenant: James Wakefield; Charles A. Gilman
- Preceded by: Cushman Davis
- Succeeded by: Lucius Frederick Hubbard

Personal details
- Born: July 29, 1827 Sutton, New Hampshire, U.S.
- Died: October 18, 1901 (aged 74) Minneapolis, Minnesota, U.S.
- Resting place: Lakewood Cemetery in Minneapolis, Minnesota.
- Party: Republican
- Spouse: Mahala Fisk (m. 1856)
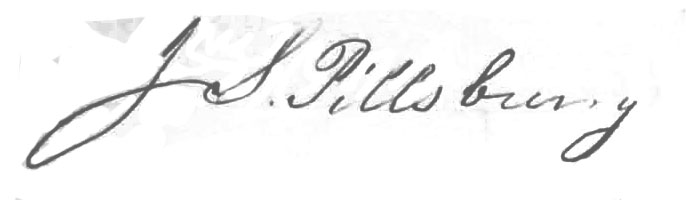
- Signature

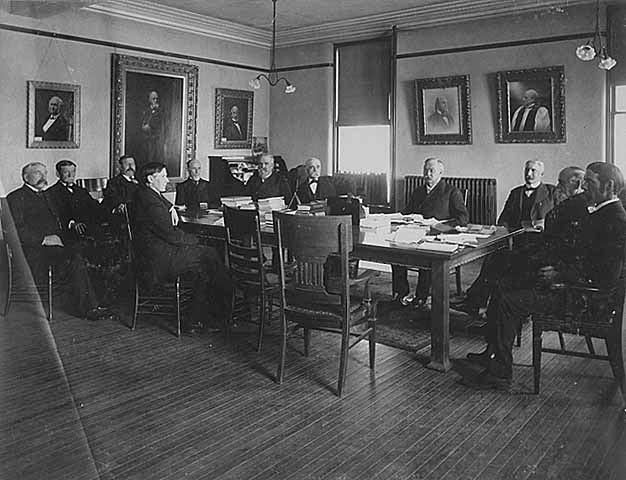
Pillsbury at a Board of Regents meeting at the University of Minnesota.

John Sargent Pillsbury (July 29, 1827 – October 18, 1901) was an American politician, businessman, and philanthropist. A Republican, he served as the eighth governor of Minnesota from 1876 to 1882. He was a co-founder of the Pillsbury Company.

== Early life ==
Pillsbury was born in Sutton, New Hampshire, the son of John and Susan (Wadleigh) Pillsbury. He was a descendant of William Pillsbury, who emigrated from England to Newburyport, Massachusetts, in 1640. In 1851, he opened a store in Warner, New Hampshire, partnering with Walter Harriman, a future governor of New Hampshire and Civil War general.

== Career ==
=== Pillsbury Company ===
Pillsbury underwent a tour of the West in 1855, and decided to make St. Anthony, Minnesota, now part of Minneapolis his home. Shortly after settling in Minnesota, he would marry Mahala Fisk. Pillsbury began a diverse entrepreneurial career including ventures in hardware, real estate and lumber before he would found his most successful business, C. A. Pillsbury and Company, along with his nephew Charles Alfred Pillsbury, for whom the company was named.

=== Political career ===
Although Pillsbury did not serve in the Union Army, he was instrumental in the organization of the 1st Minnesota Infantry Regiment, the 2nd Minnesota Infantry Regiment, the 3rd Minnesota Infantry Regiment, and the 1st Minnesota Cavalry Regiment during the American Civil War and the Dakota War of 1862 from 1861 to 1865.

In 1888, Pillsbury was elected as a 3rd Class (honorary) Companion of the Military Order of the Loyal Legion of the United States in recognition of his contributions to the Union cause.

Pillsbury served in the Minnesota Senate for several years before becoming the eighth Governor of Minnesota. He served as governor from January 7, 1876, until January 10, 1882. During the Grasshopper Plague of 1877, Governor Pillsbury called for a day of prayer on April 26, 1877. A subsequent sleet storm killed all the grasshoppers. In Cold Spring, Minnesota, a chapel was built to honor the miracle.

He is notable as the first governor of Minnesota to serve for three terms. In 1881, he ran for a fourth but was defeated in the primary by Lucius Frederick Hubbard.

=== Philanthropist ===
Pillsbury was a noted philanthropist and often anonymously donated funds to causes he favored. In particular, he helped the University of Minnesota recover from debt in its early years, and later served as a regent. Since then, he has become known as "The Father of the University." Pillsbury Hall at the University of Minnesota is named in his honor.

== Personal life ==
Pillsbury married Mahala Fisk on November 3, 1856. He and Mahala had four children, daughters Addie, Susan May, and Sarah Belle, and then son Alfred. Addie married Charles M. Webster, but died at the age of 25; Susan married Frederic Beal Snyder and died at the age of 28; Sarah Belle married Edward C. Gale, an area lawyer and son of the area's first real estate developer, Samuel Chester Gale. Edward Gale was also an art collector and contributed to the Minneapolis Institute of Arts (MIA) as well. Alfred did not go into business, but instead became an art collector. When he died in 1950, the works were donated to MIA.

His daughter's Susan's only son, John Pillsbury Snyder (1888 –1959), was a survivor of the RMS Titanic in 1912. John and his wife, Nelle, returning from their European honeymoon, are said to have been the first people to have entered the very first lifeboat, No. 7.

Pillsbury died on October 18, 1901, and is interred in Lakewood Cemetery in Minneapolis, Minnesota. He is featured on a New Hampshire historical marker (number 44) along New Hampshire Route 114 in Sutton.

== Quote ==
A 1901 magazine article described him as follows:

[Pillsbury's] impulse always was: "Act; act now; act effectively; act for the greatest good." He belonged to the type of man who "does things."

— Horace B. Hudson, The American Monthly Review of Reviews

Party political offices
Preceded by Cushman Kellogg Davis	Republican nominee for Governor of Minnesota; 1875, 1877, 1879	Succeeded by Lucius Frederick Hubbard
Political offices
Preceded by Cushman Davis	Governor of Minnesota; 1876–1882	Succeeded by Lucius Frederick Hubbard
