= List of elections in 1875 =

The following elections occurred in the year 1875.

- 1875–76 Colombian presidential election
- May 1875 Ecuadorian presidential election
- October 1875 Ecuadorian presidential election
- 1875 Faroese general election
- 1875 Greek parliamentary election
- 1875 Hungarian parliamentary election
- 1875 Liberian general election
- 1875 Liechtenstein general election
- 1875 Luxembourg general election
- 1875–1876 New Zealand general election
- 1875 Serbian parliamentary election
- 1875 Swedish general election
- 1875 Swiss federal election

== North America ==
=== Canada ===
- 1875 British Columbia general election
- 1875 Ontario general election
- 1875 Quebec general election

=== United States ===
- 1875 New York state election

==== United States Senate ====
- 1874 and 1875 United States Senate elections
- United States Senate election in New York, 1875
- 1875 United States Senate election in Pennsylvania
- 1875 United States Senate election in Wisconsin

==== United States House of Representatives ====
- 1874 and 1875 United States House of Representatives elections
- 1875 United States House of Representatives elections in California

==== United States lieutenant gubernatorial ====
- 1875 California lieutenant gubernatorial election
- 1875 Connecticut lieutenant gubernatorial election
- 1875 Minnesota lieutenant gubernatorial election
- 1875 Wisconsin lieutenant gubernatorial election

==== United States gubernatorial ====
- 1875 California gubernatorial election
- 1875 Connecticut gubernatorial election
- 1875 Iowa gubernatorial election
- 1875 Kentucky gubernatorial election
- 1875 Maine gubernatorial election
- 1875 Maryland gubernatorial election
- 1875 Minnesota gubernatorial election
- 1875 Massachusetts gubernatorial election
- 1875 New Hampshire gubernatorial election
- 1875 Ohio gubernatorial election
- 1875 Pennsylvania gubernatorial election
- 1875 Rhode Island gubernatorial election
- 1875 Wisconsin gubernatorial election

==== United States mayoral elections ====
- 1875 Boston mayoral election
- 1875 Manchester, New Hampshire mayoral election

== See also ==
- Category:1875 elections
