= 1878 United States elections =

- ← 1876 1877 1878 1879 1880 → Midterm elections
- Election day: November 5
- Incumbent president: ▌Rutherford B. Hayes (R)
- Next Congress: 46th

Senate elections
- Overall control: Democratic gain
- Seats contested: 26 of 76 seats
- Net seat change: Democratic +6
- Results: Democratic gain Democratic hold Republican gain Republican hold Legislature failed to elect

House elections
- Overall control: Democratic hold
- Seats contested: All 293 voting seats
- Net seat change: Democratic -14
- Results; Democratic gain Democratic hold Republican gain Republican hold Independent gain Independent hold Greenback gain

Elections occurred in the middle of Republican President Rutherford B. Hayes's term, during the Third Party System. It was the first election following the end of the Reconstruction Era, and the Redeemers had gained back control of most Southern governments following the Compromise of 1877. Members of the 46th United States Congress were chosen in this election. The Democrats won control of the Senate for the first time since the start of the Civil War.

In the House, both the Democrats and the Republicans lost seats to the Greenback Party and a group of independent Democrats, with the Democrats retaining only a plurality. Democrat Samuel J. Randall won re-election as Speaker of the House through a coalition of Democrats and smaller parties.

In the Senate, Democrats picked up several seats, taking control of the chamber for the first time since 1861.

== See also ==
- 1878–79 United States House of Representatives elections
- 1878–79 United States Senate elections
