= 1880 United States elections =

- ← 1878 1879 1880 1881 1882 → Presidential election year
- Election day: November 2
- Incumbent president: ▌Rutherford B. Hayes (R)
- Next Congress: 47th

Presidential election
- Partisan control: Republican hold
- Popular vote margin: Republican +0.1%
- Electoral vote
- James A. Garfield (R): 214
- Winfield Scott Hancock (D): 155
- 1880 presidential election results. Red denotes states won by Garfield, blue denotes states won by Hancock. Numbers indicate the electoral votes won by each candidate.

Senate elections
- Overall control: Republican gain
- Seats contested: 25 of 76 seats
- Net seat change: Republican +5
- Results: Democratic gain Democratic hold Republican gain Republican hold Readjuster gain

House elections
- Overall control: Republican gain
- Seats contested: All 293 voting members
- Net seat change: Republican +19
- Results; Democratic gain Democratic hold Republican gain Republican hold Independent gain Independent hold Greenback gain Greenback hold Readjuster gain

Elections occurred during the Third Party System, and elected the members of the 47th United States Congress. The Republicans retained the presidency and took control of the House. An unclear partisan situation prevailed in the Senate. As the first presidential election after the end of the Reconstruction Era, this election saw the first occurrence of the Democratic Party sweeping the Southern United States; the party would carry an overwhelming majority of Southern states well into the 20th century.

In the presidential election, the Republican Representative James Garfield from Ohio defeated the Democratic General Winfield Hancock. Though Garfield won a clear majority of electoral votes, he won the popular vote by the smallest margin in history. Incumbent one-term Republican president Rutherford B. Hayes declined to seek re-election. Garfield emerged as the dark horse Republican nominee following the 1880 Republican National Convention, prevailing on the 36th ballot over former president Ulysses S. Grant, Maine senator James G. Blaine, and Ohio senator John Sherman. Hancock took the nomination at the 1880 Democratic National Convention on the second ballot, defeating Delaware senator Thomas F. Bayard and several other candidates. Garfield was the first sitting member of Congress to be elected president, and remains the only sitting member of the House to win a presidential election.

Republicans picked up several seats in the House, taking a majority of the chamber for the first time since the 1874 elections.

In the Senate, Republicans made small gains at the expense of the Democrats, but neither party had a majority due to the presence of an independent senator and a Readjuster senator. The Republicans and Readjusters ultimately agreed to share power, along with the Republican vice president.

== See also ==
- 1880 United States presidential election
- 1880 United States House of Representatives elections
- 1880–81 United States Senate elections
