= 1876 United States elections =

1876 general United States election

- ← 1874 1875 1876 1877 1878 → Presidential election year
- Election day: November 7
- Incumbent president: ▌Ulysses S. Grant (R)
- Next Congress: 45th

Presidential election
- Partisan control: Republican hold
- Popular vote margin: Democratic +3.0%
- Electoral vote
- Rutherford B. Hayes (R): 185
- Samuel J. Tilden (D): 184
- 1876 presidential election results. Red denotes states won by Hayes, blue denotes states won by Tilden. Numbers indicate the electoral votes won by each candidate.

Senate elections
- Overall control: Republican hold
- Seats contested: 25 of 76 seats
- Net seat change: Democratic +5
- Results: Democratic gain Democratic hold Republican gain Republican hold Independent gain

House elections
- Overall control: Democratic hold
- Seats contested: All 293 voting members
- Net seat change: Republican +33
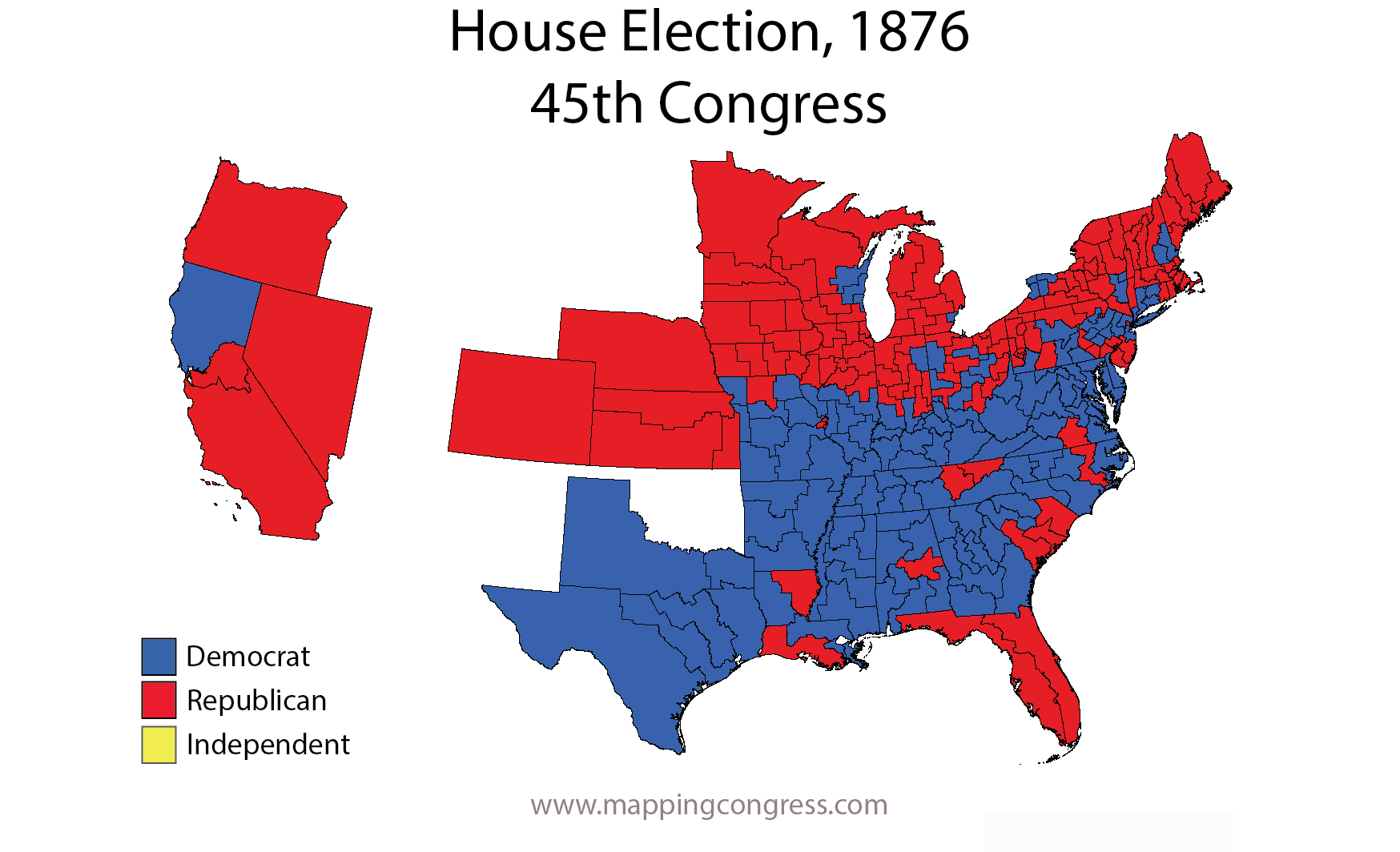
- 1876 House of Representatives election results Democratic seat Republican seat Independent seat

Elections were held on November 7, 1876. In one of the most disputed presidential elections in American history, the Republican Governor Rutherford B. Hayes of Ohio ended up winning despite the Democratic Governor Samuel J. Tilden of New York earning a majority of the popular vote. The Republicans maintained their Senate majority and cut into the Democratic majority in the House.

This marks one of four occasions where a newly elected president entered office with a divided legislature. This situation occurred again in 1860, 1884, and 1980. 1980 is the only other occasion where the president's party held the Senate, but not the House. A divided Congress also occurred after the 1984 and 2012 elections.

== President ==
The 1876 presidential election was heavily contested, and saw the highest turnout of voting age population in American history, 81.8%. Democratic Governor Samuel J. Tilden of New York won the Democratic nomination on the second ballot of the 1876 Democratic National Convention, defeating Indiana Governor Thomas A. Hendricks and a handful of other candidates. Republicans chose Ohio Governor Rutherford B. Hayes on the seventh ballot over Maine Senator James G. Blaine, Senator Oliver P. Morton of Indiana, Secretary of the Treasury Benjamin H. Bristow, and several other candidates.

While Tilden outpolled Hayes in the popular vote by a margin of three percent, he had 184 electoral votes to Hayes' 165, with 20 electoral votes in dispute. In Florida, Louisiana, and South Carolina, each party reported its candidate had won the state amid various allegations of electoral fraud and intimidation of voters. At the same time, in Oregon, one elector was declared illegal (as an "elected or appointed official") and replaced.

To resolve this dispute, Congress formed the Electoral Commission to investigate these electoral votes: this commission awarded all 20 electoral votes to Hayes after a bitter legal and political battle, giving him the victory with 185 electoral votes to 184. While many Democrats felt that Tilden had been cheated out of victory, the informal "Compromise of 1877" saw Democrats recognize Hayes as President in return for the end of Reconstruction.

Excluding the four-candidate 1824 election, Hayes' margin of victory of one electoral vote has never been matched as of 2024. This was the second of five elections where the winning candidate lost the popular vote, and the only one where the popular vote loser lost by more than one point until the 2016 election.

== United States House of Representatives ==
While the Republicans picked up 33 seats in the House, it was not enough to regain a majority from the Democrats, who had 155 seats to the Republicans 136 (two seats being held by independents).

== United States Senate ==
The Democrats gained three net seats in the Senate, but the Republicans held onto their majority. Since this election was held prior to ratification of the Seventeenth Amendment, these seats were chosen by the state legislatures.
