= 1877 Wisconsin lieutenant gubernatorial election =

- November 6, 1877
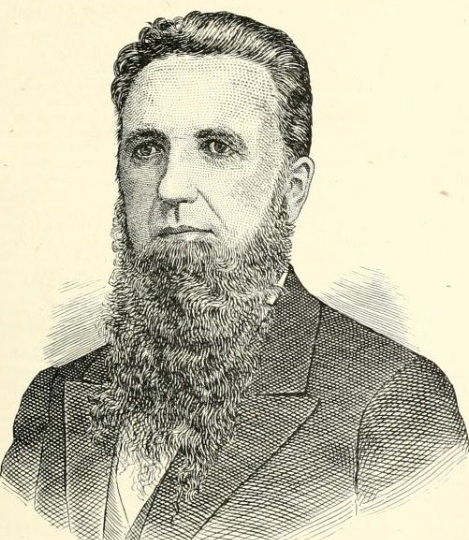

Nominee	James M. Bingham	Romanzo E. Davis	Henry L. Eaton
Party	Republican	Democratic	Greenback
Popular vote	77,926	71,656	25,745
Percentage	43.78%	40.25%	14.46%
Lieutenant Governor before election
Charles D. Parker
Democratic
Elected Lieutenant Governor
James M. Bingham
Republican

The 1877 Wisconsin lieutenant gubernatorial election was held on November 6, 1877, in order to elect the lieutenant governor of Wisconsin. Republican nominee and former Speaker of the Wisconsin State Assembly James M. Bingham defeated Democratic nominee and incumbent member of the Wisconsin Senate Romanzo E. Davis, Greenback nominee E. H. Benton and Independent candidate B. H. Brown.

== General election ==
On election day, November 6, 1877, Republican nominee James M. Bingham won the election by a margin of 6,270 votes against his foremost opponent Democratic nominee Romanzo E. Davis, thereby gaining Republican control over the office of lieutenant governor. Bingham was sworn in as the 13th lieutenant governor of Wisconsin on January 7, 1878.

=== Results ===
Wisconsin lieutenant gubernatorial election, 1877
Party	Candidate	Votes	%
Republican	James M. Bingham	77,926	43.78
Democratic	Romanzo E. Davis	71,656	40.25
Greenback	E. H. Benton	25,745	14.46
Independent	B. H. Brown	2,165	1.22
	Scattering	515	0.29
Total votes		178,007	100.00
Republican gain from Democratic			
