= 1875 Wisconsin lieutenant gubernatorial election =

- November 2, 1875
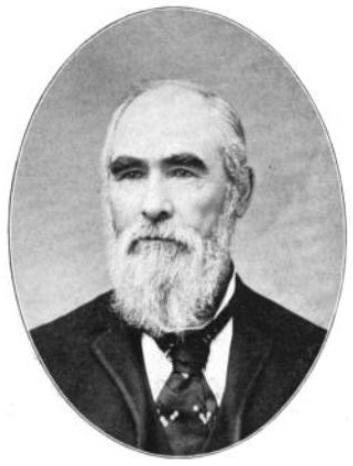

Nominee	Charles D. Parker	Henry L. Eaton
Party	Democratic	Republican
Popular vote	85,437	84,238
Percentage	50.18%	49.48%
Lieutenant Governor before election
Charles D. Parker
Democratic
Elected Lieutenant Governor
Charles D. Parker
Democratic

The 1875 Wisconsin lieutenant gubernatorial election was held on November 2, 1875, in order to elect the lieutenant governor of Wisconsin. Incumbent Democratic lieutenant governor Charles D. Parker defeated Republican nominee and former member of the Wisconsin Senate Henry L. Eaton. This election marked the first time in the state's history a Democratic lieutenant governor was re-elected.

== General election ==
On election day, November 2, 1875, incumbent Democratic lieutenant governor Charles D. Parker won re-election by a margin of 1,199 votes against his opponent Republican nominee Henry L. Eaton, thereby retaining Democratic control over the office of lieutenant governor. Parker was sworn in for his second term on January 3, 1876.

=== Results ===
Wisconsin lieutenant gubernatorial election, 1875
Party	Candidate	Votes	%
Democratic	Charles D. Parker (incumbent)	85,437	50.18
Republican	Henry L. Eaton	84,238	49.48
	Scattering	587	0.34
Total votes		170,262	100.00
Democratic hold			
