= List of elections in 1879 =

The following elections occurred in the year 1879.

== Africa ==
- 1879 Liberian general election

== Europe ==
- Cisleithania (part of Austria-Hungary): election of the Imperial Council (details here)
- 1879 Danish Folketing election
- 1879 Faroese general election
- 1879 Greek parliamentary election
- 1879 Norwegian parliamentary election
- 1879 Portuguese legislative election
- Prussian House of Representatives
- 1879 Spanish general election
- United Kingdom local elections (see here)

=== Bulgaria ===
- 1879 Bulgarian Constituent Assembly election
- 1879 Bulgarian parliamentary election

== North America ==
=== Canada ===
- 1879 Manitoba general election
- 1879 Ontario general election
- 1879 Prince Edward Island general election

=== United States ===
- 1879 New York state election

==== United States Senate ====
- 1878 and 1879 United States Senate elections
- United States Senate election in New York, 1879
- 1879 United States Senate election in Pennsylvania
- 1879 United States Senate election in Wisconsin

==== United States House of Representatives ====
- 1878 and 1879 United States House of Representatives elections
- 1879 United States House of Representatives elections in California

==== United States lieutenant gubernatorial ====
- 1879 California lieutenant gubernatorial election
- 1879 Minnesota lieutenant gubernatorial election
- 1879 Wisconsin lieutenant gubernatorial election

==== United States gubernatorial ====
- 1879 California gubernatorial election
- 1879 Iowa gubernatorial election
- 1879 Kentucky gubernatorial election
- 1879 Louisiana gubernatorial election
- 1879 Maine gubernatorial election
- 1879 Maryland gubernatorial election
- 1879 Massachusetts gubernatorial election
- 1879 Minnesota gubernatorial election
- 1879 New York gubernatorial special election
- 1879 Ohio gubernatorial election
- 1879 Rhode Island gubernatorial election
- 1879 Wisconsin gubernatorial election

==== United States mayoral elections ====
- 1879 Boston mayoral election
- 1879 Chicago mayoral election

== Oceania ==
- 1879 New Zealand general election

== See also ==
- Category:1879 elections
