= 1882 United States elections =

- ← 1880 1881 1882 1883 1884 → Midterm elections
- Election day: November 7
- Incumbent president: ▌Chester A. Arthur (R)
- Next Congress: 48th

Senate elections
- Overall control: Republican hold
- Seats contested: 26 of 76 seats
- Net seat change: Readjuster +1
- Results: Democratic gain Democratic hold Republican gain Republican hold Readjuster gain Legislature failed to elect

House elections
- Overall control: Democratic gain
- Seats contested: All 325 voting seats
- Net seat change: Democratic +68
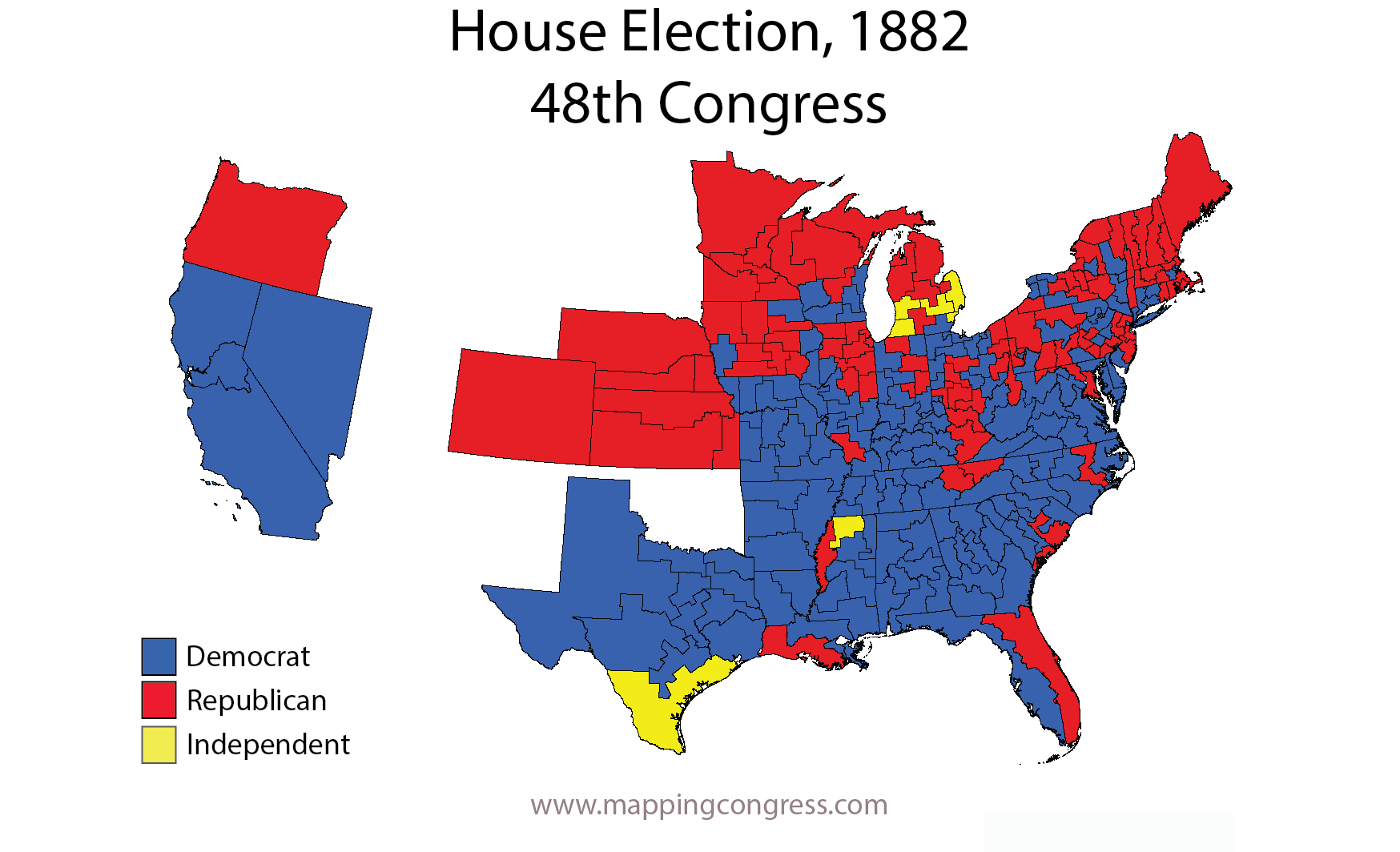
- 1882 House of Representatives election results Democratic seat Republican seat Independent seat

Elections occurred in the middle of Republican President Chester A. Arthur's term, during the Third Party System. Arthur had become president on September 19, 1881, upon the death of his predecessor, James Garfield. Members of the 48th United States Congress were chosen in this election. Democrats won control of the House, while Republicans won control of the Senate.

Following the 1880 census, the size of the House increased by 32 seats. Democrats won major gains, taking control of the chamber.

In the Senate, the Readjusters picked up one seat allowing Senate Republicans to hold a majority in a coalition with them.

== See also ==
- 1882 United States House of Representatives elections
- 1882–83 United States Senate elections
