= May 1875 Ecuadorian presidential election =

- 1875
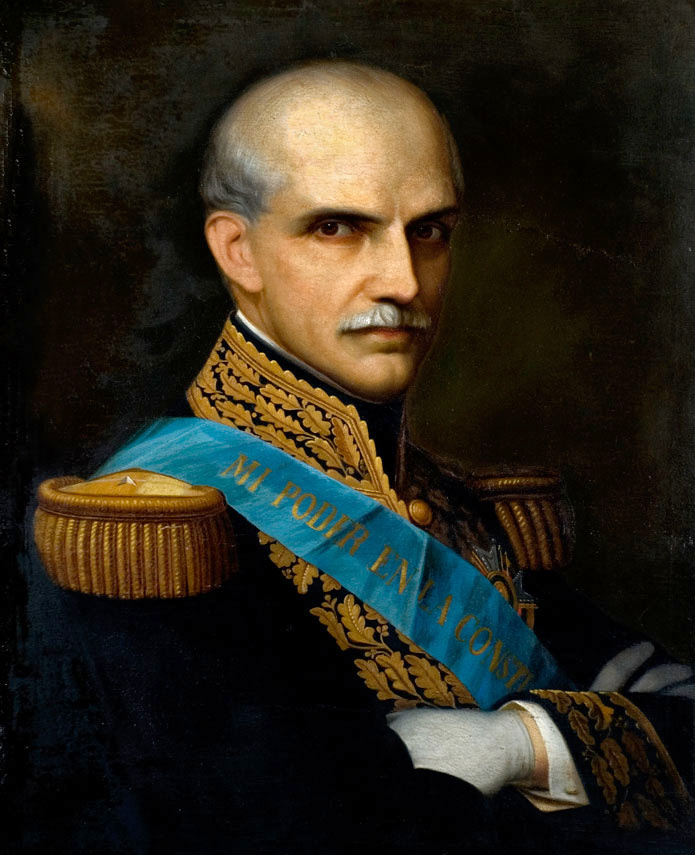

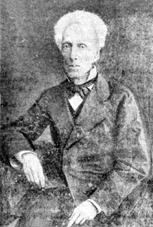
Nominee	Gabriel García Moreno	José Javier Eguiguren
Popular vote	22,529	79
Percentage	99.16%	0.35%
President before election
Gabriel García Moreno
Elected President
Gabriel García Moreno

Presidential elections were held in Ecuador in May 1975. The result was a victory for incumbent president Gabriel García Moreno, who received over 99% of the vote. García was assassinated in August and fresh elections were held in October.

== Results ==
Candidate	Votes	%
Gabriel García Moreno	22,529	99.16
José Javier Eguiguren	79	0.35
Antonio Borrero	59	0.26
Vicente Piedrahíta	12	0.05
Luis Amador	7	0.03
Pedro Moncayo	7	0.03
Francisco Javier Aguirre	3	0.01
Pedro Carbo	3	0.01
Ignacio Veintemilla	3	0.01
Manuel Gómez de la Torre	2	0.01
Luis Antonio Salazar	2	0.01
Juan Montalvo	2	0.01
Manuel Uraga	2	0.01
Francisco Javier Salazar	2	0.01
Angel Tola	1	0.00
Carlos Icaza	1	0.00
José Maria Icaza	1	0.00
Concepcion Barros	1	0.00
Sixto Santos	1	0.00
Eloy González	1	0.00
Manuel Vega	1	0.00
Total	22,719	100.00
Valid votes	22,719	99.97
Invalid/blank votes	7	0.03
Total votes	22,726	100.00
Source: El Nactional
