= Bookwalter =

Bookwalter is a surname. Notable people with the surname include:

- Brent Bookwalter (born 1984), American cyclist
- DeVeren Bookwalter (1939–1987), American actor and theatre director
- John W. Bookwalter (fl. 1880s), Democratic Party nominee in the 1881 Ohio gubernatorial election
