= Senator Stebbins =

Senator Stebbins may refer to:

- Charles Stebbins (1789–1873), New York State Senate
- De Wayne Stebbins (1835–1901), Wisconsin State Senate
- Solomon B. Stebbins (1830–1910), Massachusetts State Senate
