= 1881 United States Senate election in Wisconsin =

- January 26, 1881
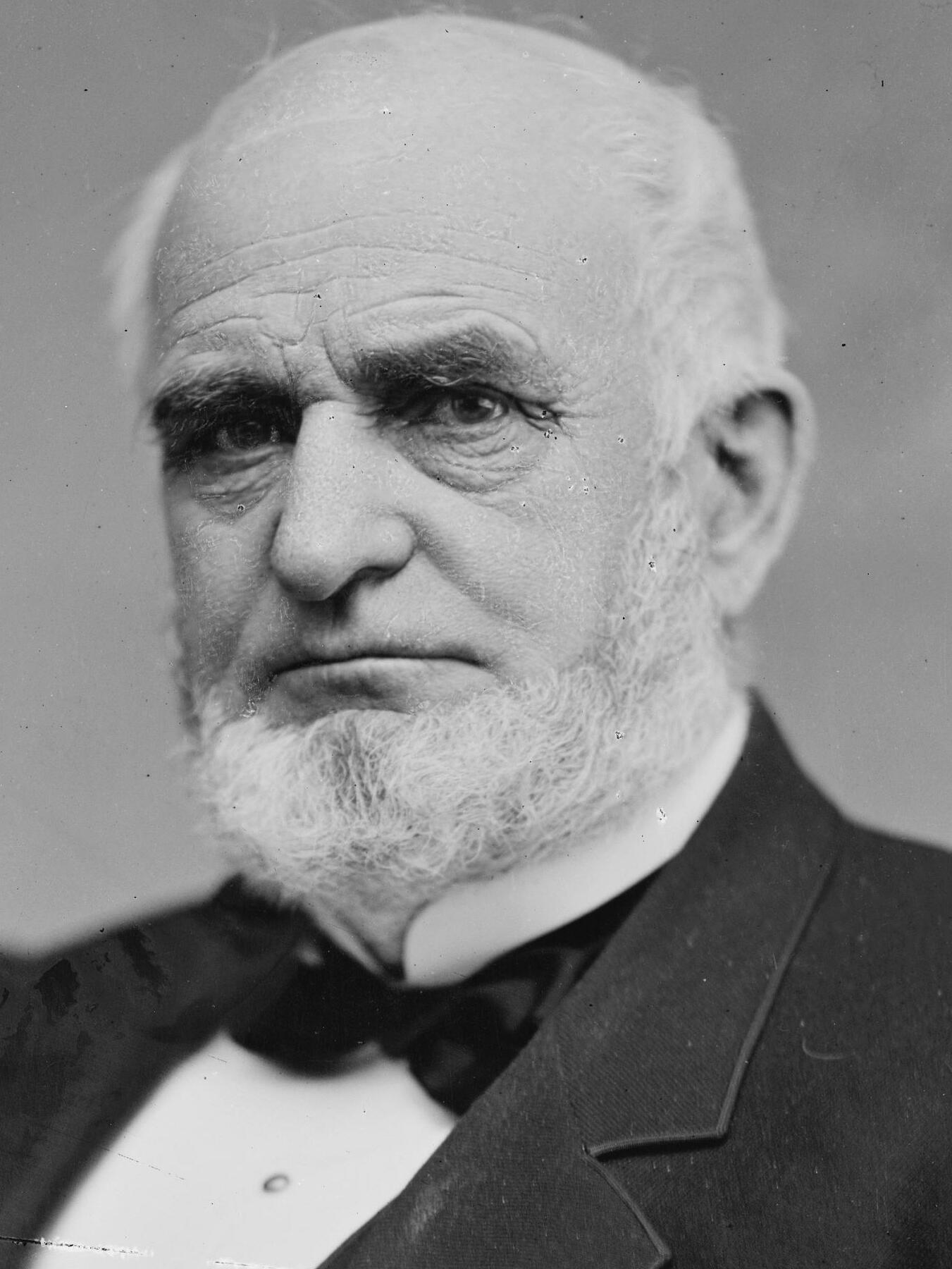

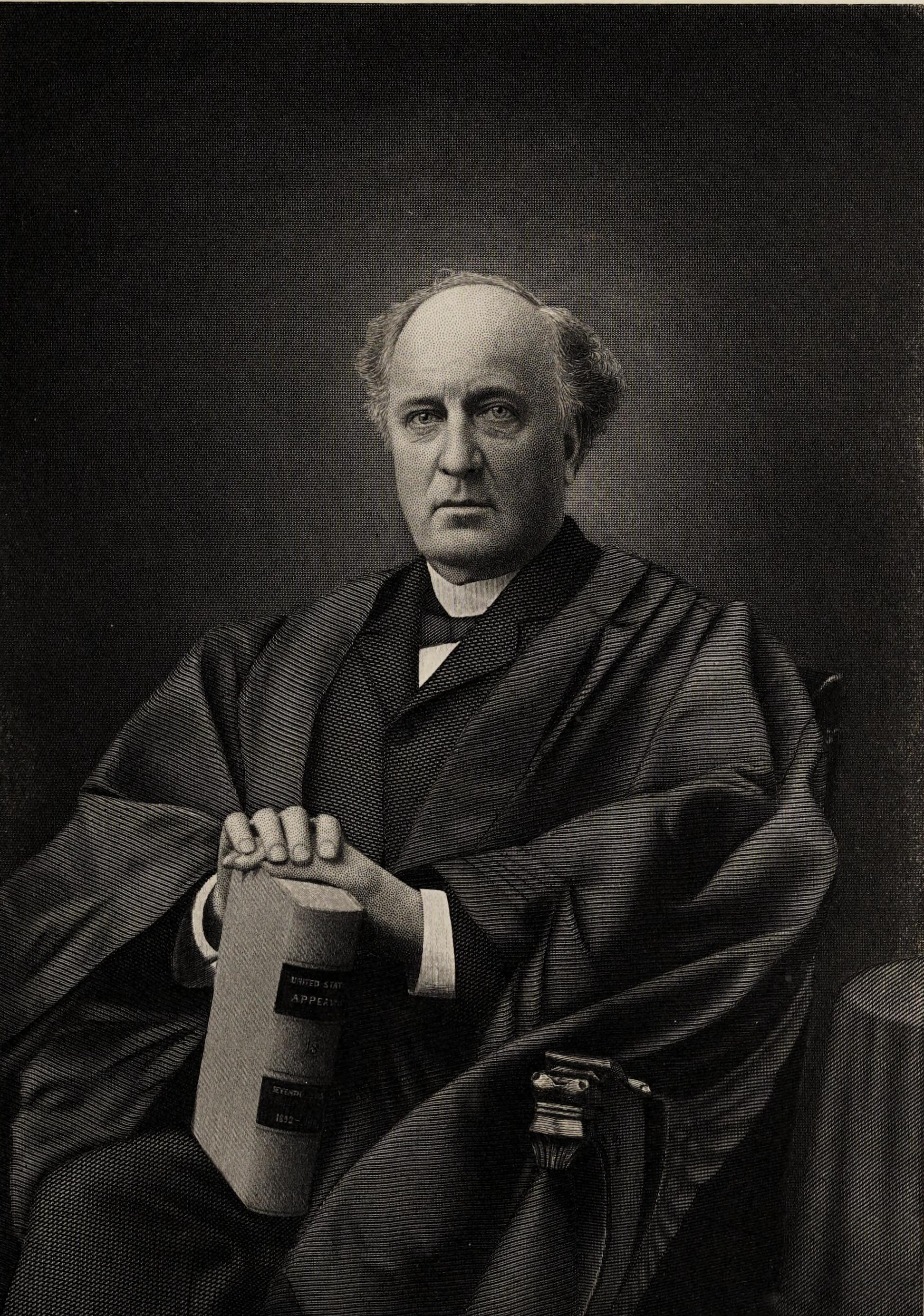
Nominee	Philetus Sawyer	James Graham Jenkins	others
Party	Republican	Democratic
Legislative vote	98	29	3
Percentage	75.38%	22.31%	2.31%
U.S. senator before election
Angus Cameron
Republican
Elected U.S. Senator
Philetus Sawyer
Republican

The 1881 United States Senate election in Wisconsin was held in the 34th Wisconsin Legislature January 26, 1881. Incumbent Republican U.S. senator Angus Cameron did not run for re-election. Republican former U.S. representative Philetus Sawyer was elected United States senator on the first ballot.

In the 1881 term, Republicans held overwhelming majorities in both chambers of the Wisconsin Legislature, so had more than enough votes to elect a Republican United States senator. The main contest was in the Republican legislative caucus, but the former U.S. representative, Sawyer, was quickly nominated after demonstrating a clear majority of support.

== Major candidates ==
=== Democratic ===
- James Graham Jenkins, prominent attorney from Milwaukee.

=== Republican ===
- Elisha W. Keyes, head of the "Madison Regency" political machine and de-facto head of the Republican Party of Wisconsin throughout this era, former mayor of Madison.
- Philetus Sawyer, former U.S representative and former mayor of Oshkosh, Wisconsin.

== Results ==
=== Republican nomination ===
Prior to the 1880 legislative elections, Sawyer made it clear that he was seeking to succeed Angus Cameron as United States senator, supporting allies in legislative nominating contests throughout the state. After the election, Sawyer was projected to easily achieve a majority of the caucus on the first ballot. Those predictions were confirmed when the Republican caucus met on January 19, 1881. An informal poll found a clear majority for Sawyer's nomination, and the caucus then chose to formally recognize him as their nominee by acclamation.

=== Official vote ===
The 34th Wisconsin Legislature met in joint session on January 26, 1881, to elect a U.S. senator. The voting went almost exactly along party lines, with three members absent. Of the members present and voting, Philetus Sawyer received the votes of all but two Republican legislators, winning the election.

1st Vote of the 34th Wisconsin Legislature, January 26, 1881
Party	Candidate	Votes	%
Republican	Philetus Sawyer	98 (Note: Sawyer received the votes of all Republicans except representatives Albert O. Chamberlain, Henry B. Howe, Walter Maxwell (who were all absent), and representatives John H. Case and Thomas M. Corbett (who voted for Washburn).)	75.38%
Democratic	James Graham Jenkins	29	22.31%
Republican	Cadwallader C. Washburn	2 (Note: Republican representatives John H. Case and Thomas M. Corbett voted for Cadwallader C. Washburn.)	1.54%
Democratic	Charles D. Parker	1 (Note: Democratic senator Matthew Anderson voted for Charles D. Parker.)	0.77%
	Absent or not voting	3	
Majority		66	50.77%
Total votes		130	97.74%
Republican hold			
