= Senator Case =

Senator Case may refer to:

== Members of the United States Senate ==
- Clifford P. Case (1904–1982), U.S. Senator from New Jersey from 1955 to 1979
- Francis H. Case (1896–1962), U.S. Senator from South Dakota from 1951 to 1962

== United States state senate members ==
- Cale Case (born 1958), Wyoming State Senate
- Clarence E. Case (1877–1961), New Jersey State Senate
- Jerome Case (1819–1891), Wisconsin State Senate
- John Higley Case (1832–1890), Minnesota State Senate
- Leon D. Case (1877–1939), Michigan State Senate
