= List of elections in 1881 =

The following elections occurred in the year 1881.

== Africa ==
- 1881 Liberian general election

== Europe ==
- 1881 Bulgarian Constitutional Assembly election
- May 1881 Danish Folketing election
- July 1881 Danish Folketing election
- 1881 Faroese general election
- 1881 French legislative election
- 1881 German federal election
- 1881 Greek parliamentary election
- 1881 Hungarian parliamentary election
- 1881 Luxembourg general election
- 1881 Portuguese legislative election
- 1881 Spanish general election
- 1881 Swedish general election
- 1881 Swiss federal election

== North America ==
=== Canada ===
- 1881 Quebec general election

=== United States ===
- 1881 New York state election

==== United States Senate ====
- 1880 and 1881 United States Senate elections
- 1881 United States Senate election in California
- 1881 United States Senate election in New York
- 1881 United States Senate election in Pennsylvania
- 1881 United States Senate election in Wisconsin
- 1881 United States Senate special election in Wisconsin

==== United States House of Representatives ====
- 1881 United States House of Representatives elections

==== United States lieutenant gubernatorial ====
- 1881 Minnesota lieutenant gubernatorial election

==== United States gubernatorial ====
- 1881 Iowa gubernatorial election
- 1881 Massachusetts gubernatorial election
- 1881 Minnesota gubernatorial election
- 1881 Mississippi gubernatorial election
- 1881 Ohio gubernatorial election
- 1881 Rhode Island gubernatorial election
- 1881 Virginia gubernatorial election
- 1881 Wisconsin gubernatorial election

==== United States mayoral elections ====
- 1881 Boston mayoral election
- 1881 Buffalo mayoral election
- 1881 Chicago mayoral election
- 1881 Philadelphia mayoral election

== Oceania ==
- 1881 New Zealand general election

== South America ==
- 1881 Brazilian parliamentary election
- 1881 Chilean presidential election

== See also ==
- Category:1881 elections
