= Marieta de Veintemilla =

Ecuadorian writer, feminist and politician, first lady of Ecuador

Marieta de Veintimilla
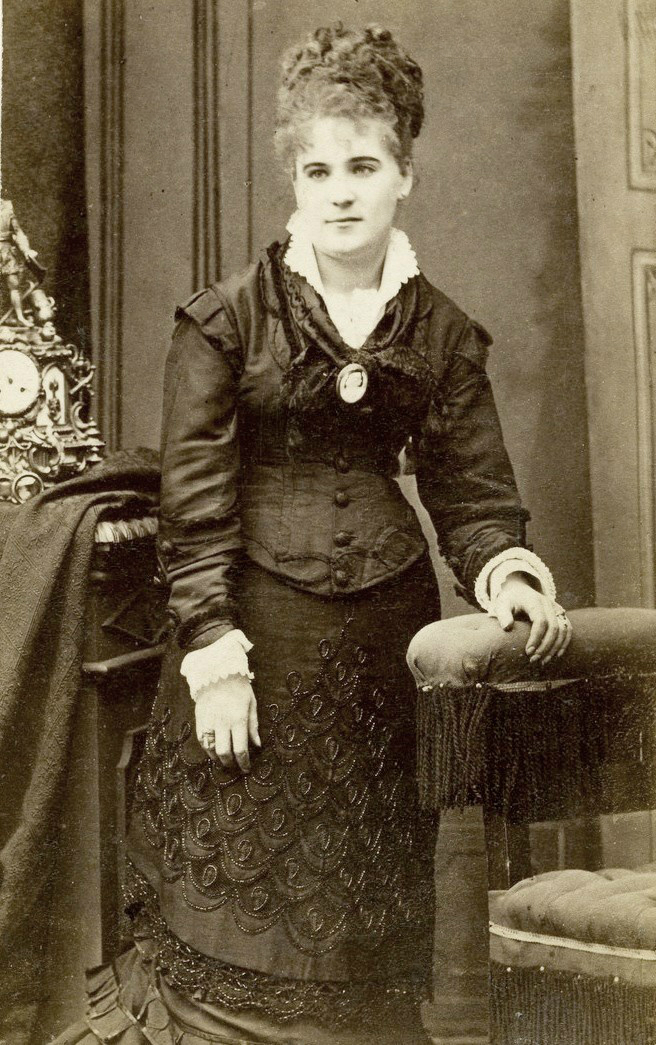

First Lady of Ecuador
- In role 8 September 1876 – 10 January 1883
- President: Ignacio de Veintemilla
- Preceded by: Rosa Lucía Moscoso Cardenas
- Succeeded by: Jesús Dávila Heredia

Personal details
- Born: 1855 Guayaquil, Ecuador
- Died: 1907 (aged 51–52) Quito, Ecuador
- Spouse: Antonio de Lapierre y Cucalón (m. 1881; died 1882)

Marieta de Veintimilla Marconi (1855-1907) was an Ecuadorian writer, feminist and politician. She served as the first lady of Ecuador during the presidency of her unmarried uncle, president Ignacio de Veintemilla 1876-1883.

== Biography ==
As first lady, she introduced many changes in dress and social attitude in gender roles: she made the upper class women of Ecuador cast off the black costumes they dressed in at the time and adopt European fashion in bright colors, and she also liberated women's space of movement by making it acceptable for women to walk in the streets without a male guardian as company, after setting an example by doing so herself in her position as first lady, walking about in the streets in public alone or in the company of a female friend.

In 1882, her uncle was absent from the capital of Quito in another part of the country. When civil war broke out during his absence, she took control of the capital, the government and its military forces in the name of her uncle's office and commanded the defense of Quite when it was attacked by the rebels in 1883. She was a such referred to as Generalita. She was the first female in Ecuador to have wielded such power. After the defeat, she was imprisoned. She was released in 1884 and forced into exile.

After her return to Ecuador in 1898, she became a leading figure in the newly founded women's movement in Ecuador as a writer and by making speeches in feminist issues.
