= Ignacio de Veintemilla =

President of Ecuador (1876–1883)

Mario Ignacio Francisco Tomás Antonio de Veintemilla y Villacís
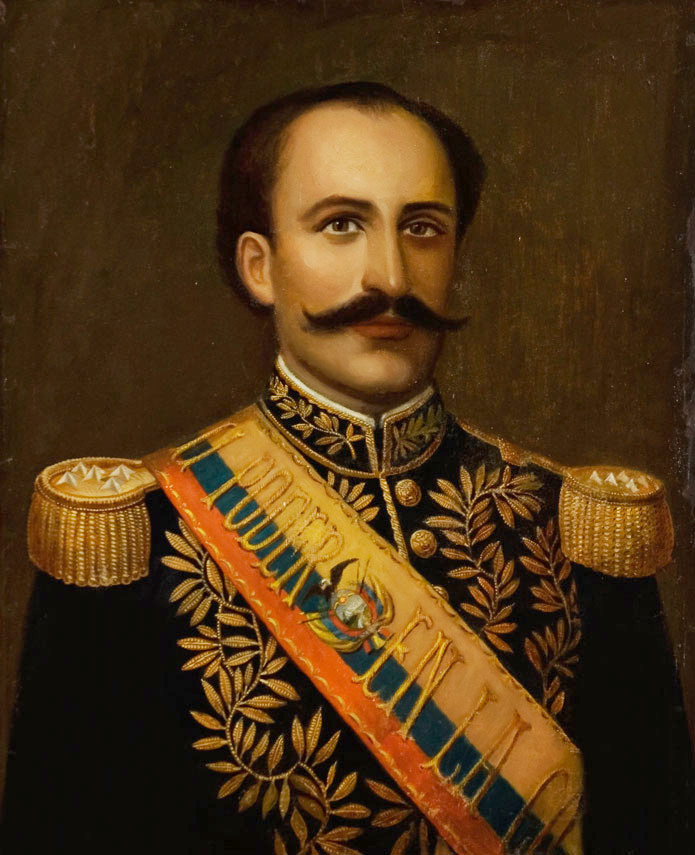

11th President of Ecuador
- In office 18 December 1876 – 9 July 1883
- Preceded by: Antonio Borrero; Himself (as President of Ecuador(opposition government))
- Succeeded by: Provisional government Members: José María Sarasti; Pedro Ignacio Lizarzaburu; Agustín Guerrero; Luis Cordero Crespo (from February 14); Pablo Herrera (to February 14); Rafael Pérez Pareja; Eloy Alfaro (as Supreme Chief of Manabí & Esmeraldas, in rebellion)

President of Ecuador (opposition government)
- In office 8 September 1876 – 19 December 1876
- Preceded by: Antonio Borrero
- Succeeded by: Himself (as official President of Ecuador)

Personal details
- Born: 31 July 1828 Quito, Gran Colombia
- Died: July 19, 1908 (aged 79) Quito, Ecuador
- Other political affiliations: Affiliated with the Ecuadorian Radical Liberal Party

Mario Ignacio Francisco Tomás Antonio de Veintemilla y Villacís (31 July 1828 – 19 July 1908) was President of Ecuador 18 December 1876 to 9 July 1883. During his presidency, his niece Marieta de Veintemilla acted as his first lady.

He came to power in a military coup in 1876 which overthrew President Antonio Borrero. After declaring himself dictator, De Veintemilla was overthrown in the 1882-1883 War of the Restoration.

Political offices
Preceded by Antonio Borrero	President of Ecuador; 1876–1883	Succeeded by Provisional government
