= List of elections in 1877 =

The following elections occurred in the year 1877.

== Africa ==
- 1877 Liberian general election

== Europe ==
- 1877 Dutch general election
- 1877 Faroese general election
- 1877 French legislative election
- 1877 German federal election
- 1877 Liechtenstein general election
- First 1877 Ottoman general election
- Second 1877 Ottoman general election
- 1877 Serbian parliamentary election

== North America ==
=== Mexico ===
- 1877 Mexico extraordinary presidential election

=== United States ===
- 1877 New York state election
- 1877 New Jersey Senate election

==== United States Senate ====
- 1876 and 1877 United States Senate elections
- 1877 United States Senate election in California
- 1877 United States Senate election in Massachusetts
- 1877 United States Senate special election in Pennsylvania

==== United States House of Representatives ====
- 1876 and 1877 United States House of Representatives elections

==== United States lieutenant gubernatorial ====
- 1877 Minnesota lieutenant gubernatorial election
- 1877 Wisconsin lieutenant gubernatorial election

==== United States gubernatorial ====
- 1877 Iowa gubernatorial election
- 1877 Maine gubernatorial election
- 1877 Massachusetts gubernatorial election
- 1877 Minnesota gubernatorial election
- 1877 Mississippi gubernatorial election
- 1877 New Hampshire gubernatorial election
- 1877 New Jersey gubernatorial election
- 1877 Ohio gubernatorial election
- 1877 Rhode Island gubernatorial election
- 1877 Virginia gubernatorial election
- 1877 Wisconsin gubernatorial election

==== United States mayoral elections ====
- 1877 Boston mayoral election
- 1877 Chicago mayoral election
- 1877 Manchester, New Hampshire mayoral election
- 1877 Philadelphia mayoral election

== See also ==
- Category:1877 elections
