= Francisco León Franco =

Acting president of Ecuador (1875)

Francisco Javier Jeón
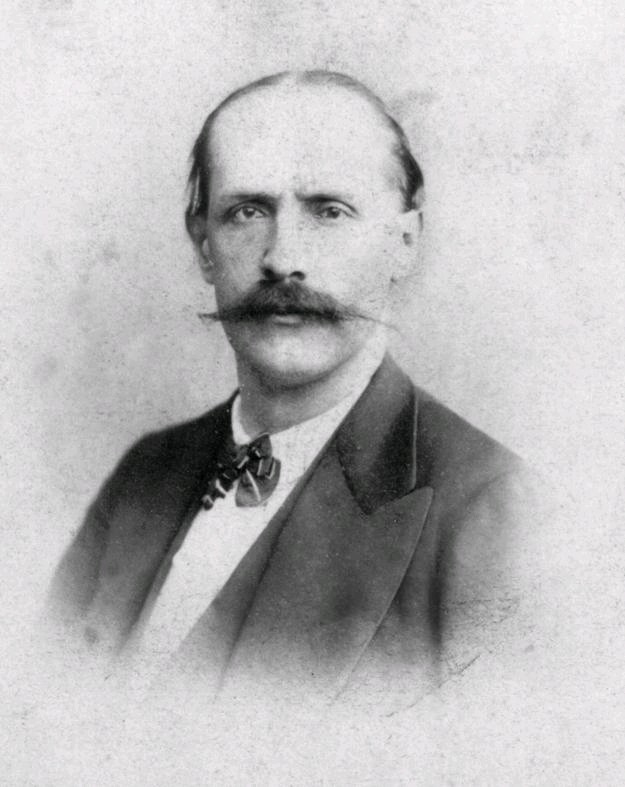

Interim President of Ecuador
- In office 6 August 1875 – 15 September 1875
- Preceded by: Gabriel García Moreno
- Succeeded by: José Javier Eguiguren

Vice President of Ecuador
- In office 1869–1875
- President: Gabriel García Moreno
- Preceded by: Pedro José de Arteta
- Succeeded by: Position vacant

Personal details
- Born: Francisco Javier Tomás León y Chiriboga; 13 October 1832
- Died: 10 August 1880 (aged 47)
- Political party: Conservative Party

Francisco Javier León Franco (13 October 1832 – 10 August 1880) was Vice President of Ecuador in the administration of Gabriel García Moreno from 1869 to 1875, and acting President of Ecuador 6 August 1875 to 6 October 1875. He was President of the Chamber of Deputies in 1865.

Political offices
| Preceded by Pedro José de Arteta | Vice President of Ecuador; 1869–1875 | Succeeded by Vacant |
| Preceded by Gabriel García Moreno | President of Ecuador; 1875 | Succeeded by José Javier Eguiguren |
