= 1880 Boston mayoral election =

Election in Massachusetts, United States

- December 14, 1880
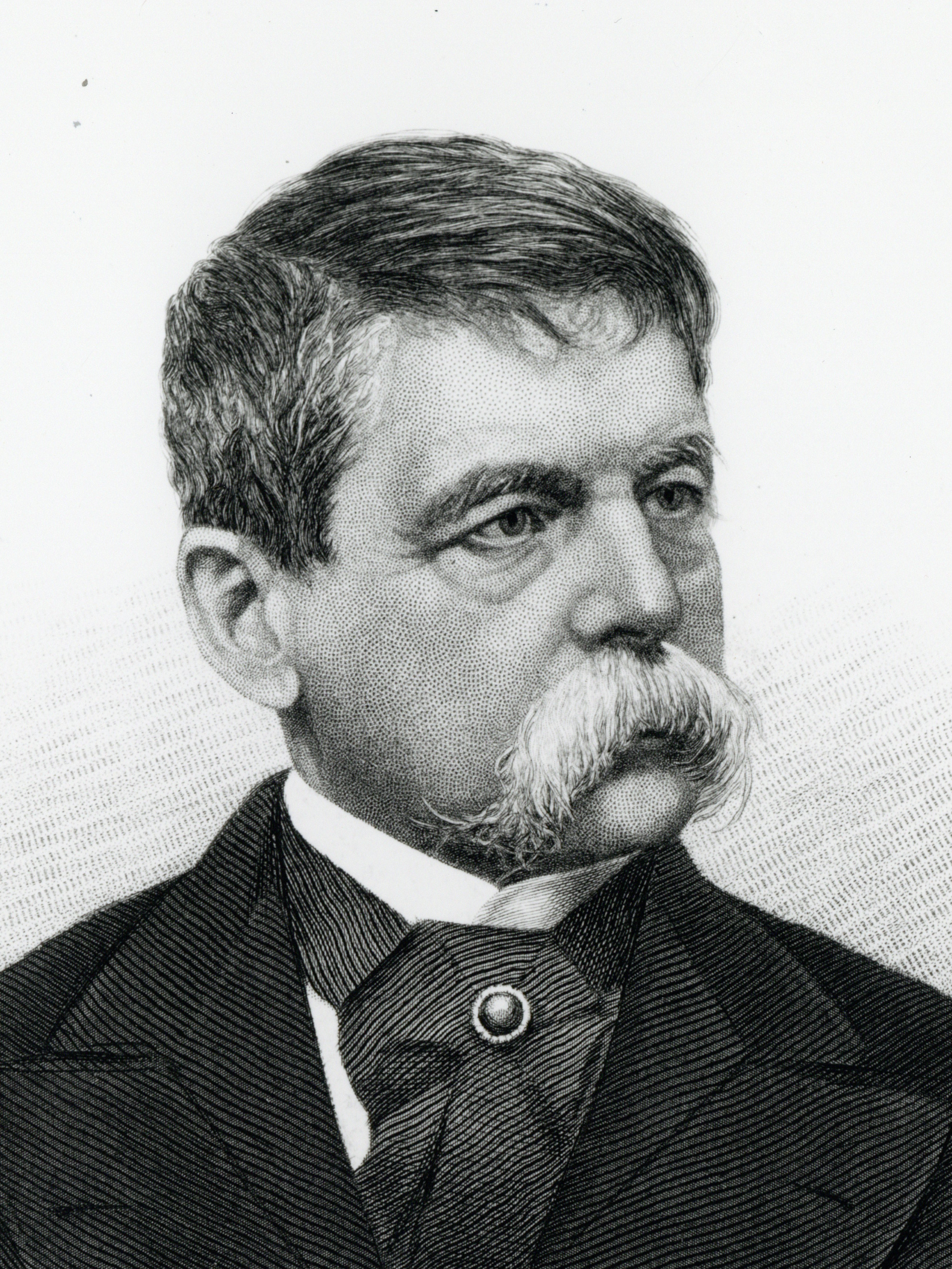

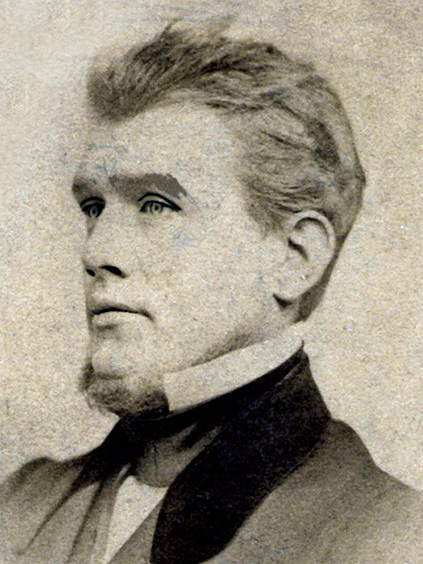
Candidate	Frederick O. Prince	Solomon B. Stebbins
Party	Democratic	Republican
Popular vote	21,112	20,531
Percentage	50.68%	49.29%
Mayor before election
Frederick O. Prince
Democratic
Elected mayor
Frederick O. Prince
Democratic

The Boston mayoral election of 1880 saw incumbent mayor Frederick O. Prince (a Democrat) reelected to his fourth overall term, defeating Republican nominee Solomon B. Stebbins.

== Nominations ==
The Democratic Party renominated incumbent mayor Frederick O. Prince. The Republican Party nominated Solomon B. Stebbins. The two had both been their party's nominees in the previous election.

== Results ==
1880 Boston mayoral election
Party	Candidate	Votes	%
Democratic	Frederick O. Prince (incumbent)	21,112	50.68
Republican	Solomon B. Stebbins	20,531	49.29
Others	Scattering	11	0.03
Turnout		41,654	

== See also ==
- List of mayors of Boston, Massachusetts
