= 1879 Wisconsin lieutenant gubernatorial election =

- November 4, 1879
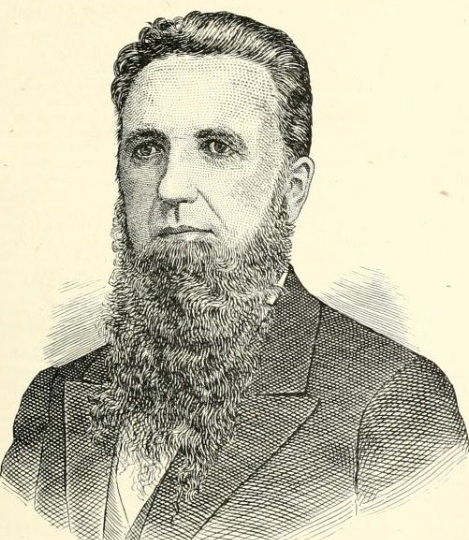

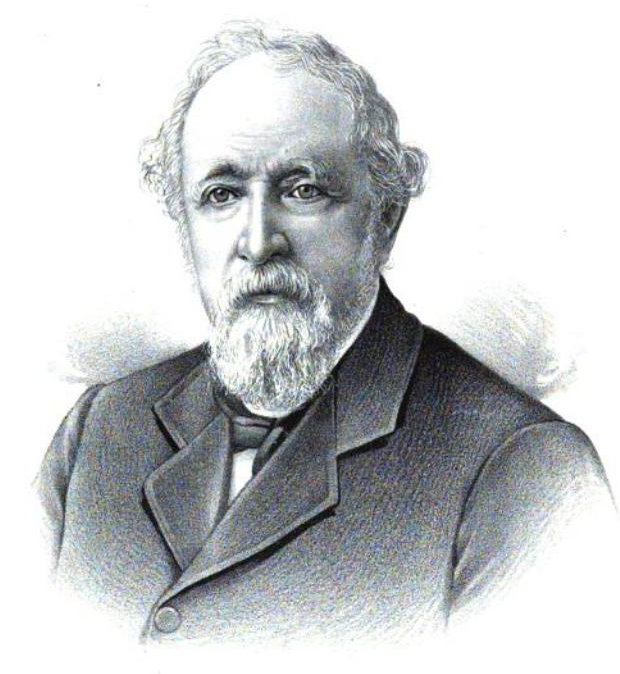
Nominee	James M. Bingham	George H. King	William L. Utley
Party	Republican	Democratic	Greenback
Popular vote	101,097	74,437	12,976
Percentage	53.50%	39.39%	6.87%
Lieutenant Governor before election
James M. Bingham
Republican
Elected Lieutenant Governor
James M. Bingham
Republican

The 1879 Wisconsin lieutenant gubernatorial election was held on November 4, 1879, in order to elect the lieutenant governor of Wisconsin. Incumbent Republican lieutenant governor James M. Bingham defeated Democratic nominee George H. King and Greenback nominee and former Adjutant General of Wisconsin William L. Utley.

== General election ==
On election day, November 4, 1879, incumbent Republican lieutenant governor James M. Bingham won re-election by a margin of 26,660 votes against his foremost opponent Democratic nominee George H. King, thereby retaining Republican control over the office of lieutenant governor. Bingham was sworn in for his second term on January 5, 1880.

=== Results ===
Wisconsin lieutenant gubernatorial election, 1879
Party	Candidate	Votes	%
Republican	James M. Bingham (incumbent)	101,097	53.50
Democratic	George H. King	74,437	39.39
Greenback	William L. Utley	12,976	6.87
	Scattering	448	0.24
Total votes		188,958	100.00
Republican hold			
