= 1881 Brazilian parliamentary election =

- 31 October 1881

122 members of the Chamber of Deputies
	First party	Second party
Party	Liberal	Conservative
Seats won	74	48
- Results by Electoral District

Parliamentary elections were held in the Empire of Brazil on 31 October 1881 to elect members of the 18th legislature of the Chamber of Deputies. These were the first direct elections held in the country after the Saraiva Law was enacted (Law No. 3,029 of 9 January 1881). The Liberal Party won 74 seats while the Conservative Party won 48. The chamber was later dissolved on 3 September 1884.

== Background ==
On 15 December 1875 emperor Pedro II of Brazil called the liberal João Lins Cansanção, the Viscount of Sinimbu, to head a new cabinet with the goal of establishing direct voting in the country. The expected reform was amidst the country's electoral, military, religious, and slavery crises. Sinimbu's bill proposed raising the minimum yearly income threshold to vote from 200 to 400 thousand réis and also prohibiting illiterates to vote. The bill, a constitutional reform, was approved in the Chamber of Deputies on 9 June 1879, but was rejected in the Senate on 12 November, and thus Sinimbu's cabinet fell. The new prime minister who followed, also a liberal, José Antônio Saraiva, took over on 28 March 1880 and managed to approve his own bill, the Saraiva Law, on 9 January 1881. The law introduced direct voting in the country, but prohibited the illiterate to vote, and so the number of electors in the country fell from over a million, or about 13% of the country's free adult population, to just over 100,000, less than 1% of the same group.

== Results ==
Party	Seats
Liberal Party	74
Conservative Party	48
Total	122
Source: Câmara dos Deputados

=== Results by province ===
Province or neutral municipality	Districts	Liberals	Conservatives	Elected votes	Total votes
Alagoas	5	4	1	1,813	3,343
Amazonas	2	1	1	399	664
Bahia	14	11	3	8,322	14,449
Ceará	8	5	3	3,592	6,777
Espírito Santo	2	2	–	739	1,426
Goiás	2	2	–	1,010	2,256
Maranhão	6	4	2	2,202	3,747
Mato Grosso	2	2	–	676	1,230
Minas Gerais	20	14	6	10,641	17,912
Neutral Municipality and Rio de Janeiro	12	2	10	7,652	13,916
Pará	3	–	3	2,321	4,304
Paraíba	5	2	3	1,691	3,067
Paraná	2	2	–	1,093	1,775
Pernambuco	13	5	8	5,344	9,757
Piauí	3	3	–	1,745	2,894
Rio Grande do Norte	2	1	1	1,324	2,423
Rio Grande do Sul	6	6	–	5,607	10,313
Santa Catarina	2	1	1	1,127	2,243
São Paulo	9	6	3	5,765	11,126
Sergipe	4	1	3	1,564	2,649
Source: Câmara dos Deputados

=== Elected members by province ===
Alagoas

District	Member	Party	Votes
1st	Tomás do Bonfim Espindola	Liberal	455
2nd	Manuel Joaquim de Mendonça Castelo Branco	Conservative	347
3rd	Francisco Ildefonso Ribeiro de Menezes	Liberal	276
4th	Lourenço Cavalcanti de Albuquerque	Liberal	339
5th	Teófilo Fernandes dos Santos	Liberal	396
Source: Câmara dos Deputados 1889, p. 374

Amazonas

District	Member	Party	Votes
1st	Antônio dos Passos Miranda	Conservative	110
2nd	Adriano Xavier de Olivera Pimentel	Liberal	289
Source: Câmara dos Deputados 1889, p. 373

Bahia

District	Member	Party	Votes
1st	Joaquim Elísio Pereira Marinho	Conservative	763
2nd	Ruy Barbosa	Liberal	443
3rd	Francisco Prisco de Sousa Paraíso	Liberal	688
4th	Francisco Maria Sodré Pereira	Liberal	649
5th	Ildefonso José de Araújo	Liberal	631
6th	Antônio Carneiro da Rocha	Liberal	853
7th	João Ferreira de Araújo Pinho	Conservative	667
8th	João Ferreira de Moura	Liberal	527
9th	Rodolfo Epifanio de Sousa Dantas	Liberal	523
10th	Aristides Cesar Spinola Zama	Liberal	629
11th	Antônio Rodrigues Lima	Liberal	660
12th	Juvencio Alves de Sousa	Liberal	607
13th	Aristides de Sousa Spinola	Liberal	241
14th	Francisco Bonifácio de Abreu	Conservative	441
Source: Câmara dos Deputados 1889, p. 375

Ceará

District	Member	Party	Votes
1st	Meton da Franca Alencar	Liberal	560
2nd	Antônio Pinto de Mendonça	Conservative	522
3rd	José Pompeu de Albuquerque Cavalcanti	Liberal	483
4th	Antônio Joaquim Rodrigues Junior	Liberal	417
5th	Paulino Franklin do Amaral	Conservative	413
6th	Leandro de Chaves Mello Ratisbona	Liberal	410
7th	Tomás Pompeu de Sousa Brasil	Liberal	368
8th	Alvaro Caminha Tavares da Silva	Conservative	391
Source: Câmara dos Deputados 1889, p. 373

Espírito Santo

District	Member	Party	Votes
1st	Daniel Accioli de Azevedo	Liberal	381
2nd	Leopoldo Augusto Deocleciano de Mello e Cunha	Liberal	358
Source: Câmara dos Deputados 1889, p. 375

Goiás

District	Member	Party	Votes
1st	André Augusto de Padua Fleury	Liberal	332
2nd	José Leopoldo de Bulhões Jardim	Liberal	678
Source: Câmara dos Deputados 1889, p. 377

Maranhão

District	Member	Party	Votes
1st	José da Silva Maia	Conservative	599
2nd	Felippe Franco de Sá	Liberal	334
3rd	Augusto Olympio Gomes de Castro	Conservative	476
4th	Salustiano Ferreira de Moraes Rego	Liberal	205
5th	Sinval Odorico de Moura	Liberal	264
6th	José Vianna Vaz	Liberal	321
Source: Câmara dos Deputados 1889, p. 373

Mato Grosso

District	Member	Party	Votes
1st	Antônio Gonçalves de Carvalho	Liberal	277
2nd	Augusto César de Pádua Fleury	Liberal	399
Source: Câmara dos Deputados 1889, p. 377

Minas Gerais

District	Member	Party	Votes
1st	Carlos Afonso de Assis Figueiredo	Liberal	460
2nd	Candido Luiz Maria de Oliveira	Liberal	472
3rd	Afonso Augusto Moreira Pena	Liberal	499
4th	Ignacio Antônio de Assis Martins	Liberal	544
5th	Martinho Álvares da Silva Campos	Liberal	481
6th	Francisco Ignacio de Carvalho Rezende	Conservative	700
7th	José Rodrigues de Lima Duarte	Liberal	678
8th	Carlos Vaz de Melo	Liberal	613
9th	José de Resende Monteiro	Conservative	753
10th	João Nogueira Penido	Liberal	587
11th	José Manoel Pereira Cabral	Conservative	705
12th	Francisco Silviano de Almeida Brandão	Liberal	750
13th	Olympio Oscar de Vilhena Valadão	Conservative	703
14th	Manoel José Soares	Conservative	561
15th	João Caetano de Oliveira e Sousa	Conservative	403
16th	Eduardo Augusto Montandon	Liberal	364
17th	João da Matta Machado	Liberal	326
18th	Joaquim Vieira de Andrade	Liberal	296
19th	Antônio Felicio dos Santos	Liberal	254
20th	Afonso Celso de Assis Figueiredo Junior	Liberal	449
Source: Câmara dos Deputados 1889, p. 377

Neutral Municipality and Rio de Janeiro

District	Member	Party	Votes
1st	Luiz Joaquim Duque Estrada Teixeira	Conservative	958
2nd	Joaquim Antônio Fernandes de Oliveira	Conservative	757
3rd	Adolfo Bezerra de Menezes	Liberal	859
4th	Paulino José Soares de Sousa	Conservative	802
5th	Francisco Belisario Soares de Sousa	Conservative	550
6th	Manoel Rodrigues Peixoto	Liberal	647
7th	João de Almeida Pereira	Conservative	621
8th	Alfredo Rodrigues Fernandes Chaves	Conservative	397
9th	João Manoel Pereira da Silva	Conservative	546
10th	Manoel Peixoto de Lacerda Werneck	Conservative	484
11th	Domingos de Andrade Figueira	Conservative	581
12th	Antônio Ferreira Vianna	Conservative	450
Source: Câmara dos Deputados 1889, p. 375

Pará

District	Member	Party	Votes
1st	José Ferreira Cantão	Conservative	1,008
2nd	Guilherme Francisco da Cruz	Conservative	588
3rd	Samuel Wallace MacDowell III	Conservative	725
Source: Câmara dos Deputados 1889, p. 373

Paraíba

District	Member	Party	Votes
1st	Anisio Salathiel Carneiro da Cunha	Conservative	456
2nd	Manoel Tertuliano Tomás Henrique	Conservative	316
3rd	José Evaristo da Cruz Gouveia	Conservative	265
4th	Manoel Carlos de Gouveia	Liberal	299
5th	Antônio Alves de Sousa Carvalho	Liberal	355
Source: Câmara dos Deputados 1889, p. 374

Paraná

District	Member	Party	Votes
1st	Generoso Marques dos Santos	Liberal	492
2nd	Manoel Alves de Araújo	Liberal	601
Source: Câmara dos Deputados 1889, p. 376

Pernambuco

District	Member	Party	Votes
1st	Manoel do Nascimento Machado Portella	Conservative	725
2nd	José Mariano Carneiro da Cunha	Liberal	715
3rd	Manoel da Trindade Peretti	Conservative	395
4th	Joaquim Tavares de Mello Barreto	Liberal	302
5th	Francisco do Rego Barros de Lacerda	Conservative	331
6th	Henrique Marques de Holanda Cavalcanti	Conservative	304
7th	Ignacio Joaquim de Sousa Leão	Conservative	362
8th	Francisco de Caldas Lins	Conservative	480
9th	José Bernardo Galvão Alcoforado Junior	Conservative	237
10th	Ulysses Machado Pereira Vianna	Liberal	313
11th	Francisco Seraphico de Assis Carvalho	Liberal	275
12th	Antônio Gonçalves Ferreira	Conservative	328
13th	Antônio Manoel de Siqueira Cavalcanti	Liberal	531
Source: Câmara dos Deputados 1889, p. 374

Piauí

District	Member	Party	Votes
1st	Candido Gil Castelo Branco	Liberal	544
2nd	José Basson de Miranda Osório	Liberal	405
3rd	Franklin Américo de Menezes Dória	Liberal	796
Source: Câmara dos Deputados 1889, p. 373

Rio Grande do Norte

District	Member	Party	Votes
1st	Amaro Carneiro Bezerra Cavalcanti	Liberal	521
2nd	Tarquínio Bráulio de Sousa Amaranto	Conservative	803
Source: Câmara dos Deputados 1889, p. 374

Rio Grande do Sul

District	Member	Party	Votes
1st	Antônio Eleutério de Camargo	Liberal	1,319
2nd	Antônio Antunes Ribas	Liberal	711
3rd	Henrique Francisco de Ávila	Liberal	758
4th	Francisco Antunes Maciel	Liberal	947
5th	José Francisco Diana	Liberal	1,085
6th	Felisberto Pereira da Silva	Liberal	807
Source: Câmara dos Deputados 1889, p. 376

Santa Catarina

District	Member	Party	Votes
1st	Alfredo de Escragnolle Taunay	Conservative	648
2nd	Manoel da Silva Mafra	Liberal	479
Source: Câmara dos Deputados 1889, p. 376

São Paulo

District	Member	Party	Votes
1st	Laurindo Abelardo de Brito	Liberal	656
2nd	Antônio Moreira de Barros	Liberal	676
3rd	José Luiz de Almeida Nogueira	Conservative	789
4th	Bento Francisco de Paula e Sousa	Liberal	551
5th	Martim Francisco Ribeiro de Andrada Filho	Liberal	575
6th	Martim Francisco Ribeiro de Andrade	Liberal	351
7th	Francisco Antônio de Sousa Queiroz Filho	Liberal	667
8th	Antônio da Costa Pinto e Silva	Conservative	572
9th	Antônio Pinheiro de Ulhôa Cintra	Conservative	748
Source: Câmara dos Deputados 1889, p. 376

Sergipe

District	Member	Party	Votes
1st	Graciliano Arístides do Prado Pimentel	Liberal	519
2nd	Antônio Dias Coelho e Melo	Liberal	393
3rd	Geminiano Brasil de Oliveira Góis	Conservative	273
4th	José Luiz Coelho e Campos	Conservative	379
Source: Câmara dos Deputados 1889, p. 374
