= 1879 Boston mayoral election =

Election in Massachusetts, United States

- December 9, 1879
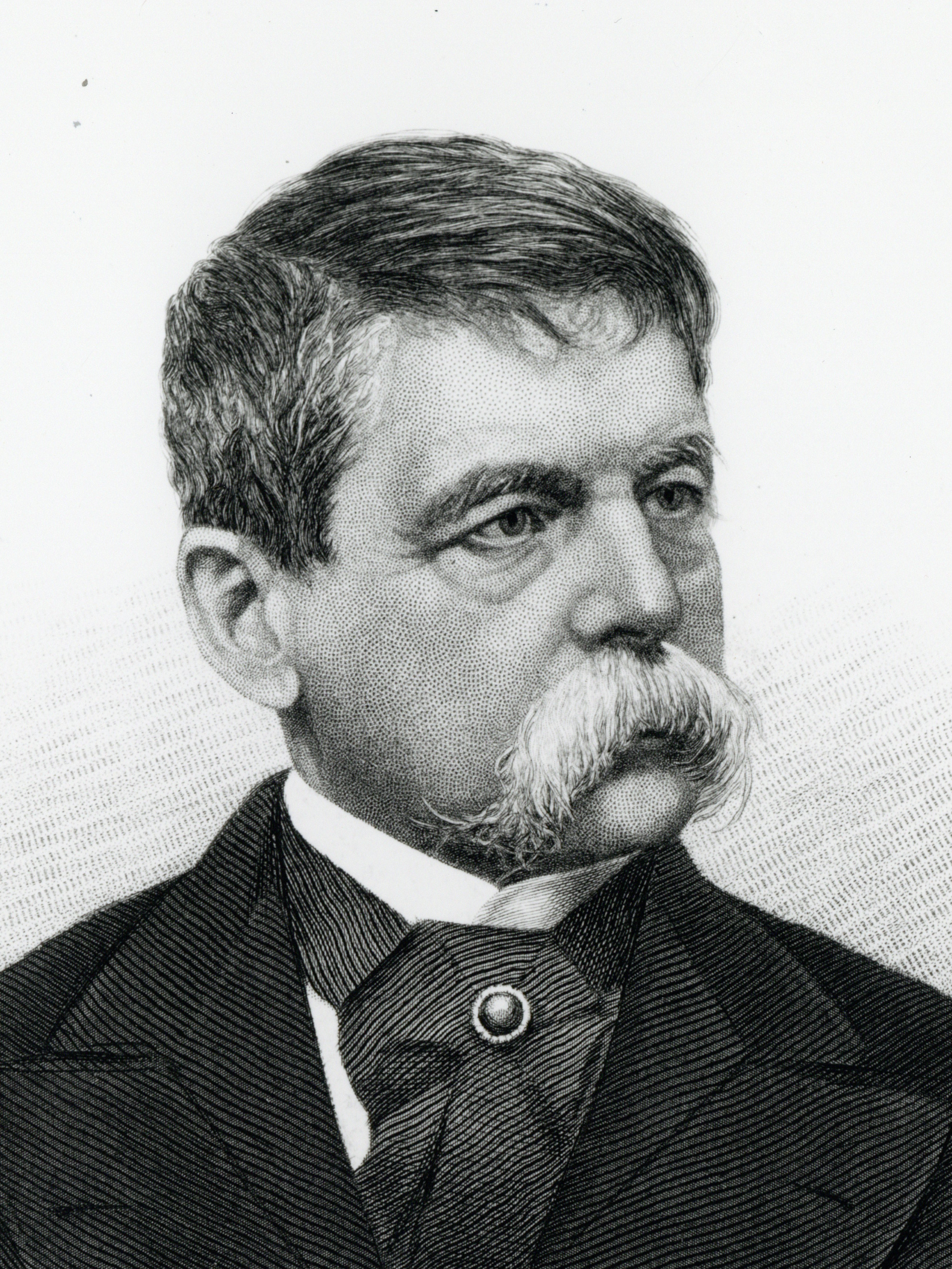

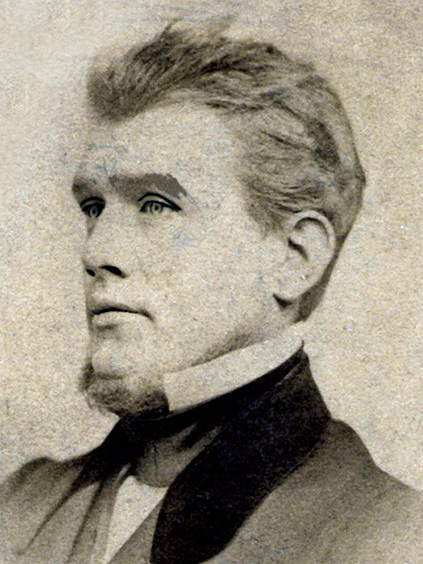
Candidate	Frederick O. Prince	Solomon B. Stebbins
Party	Democratic	Republican
Popular vote	18,697	16,083
Percentage	52.59%	45.23%
Mayor before election
Frederick O. Prince
Democratic
Elected mayor
Frederick O. Prince
Democratic

The 1879 Boston mayoral election saw Frederick O. Prince reelected to his third overall term.

== Results ==
1879 Boston mayoral election
Party	Candidate	Votes	%
Democratic	Frederick O. Prince (incumbent)	18,697	52.59%
Republican	Solomon B. Stebbins	16,083	45.23%
Greenback	Davis J. King	399	1.12%
Independent Democrat	John J. McDavitt	355	1.00%
Others	Scattering	21	0.06%
Turnout		35,555	

== See also ==
- List of mayors of Boston, Massachusetts
