= October 1875 Ecuadorian presidential election =

- October 1875
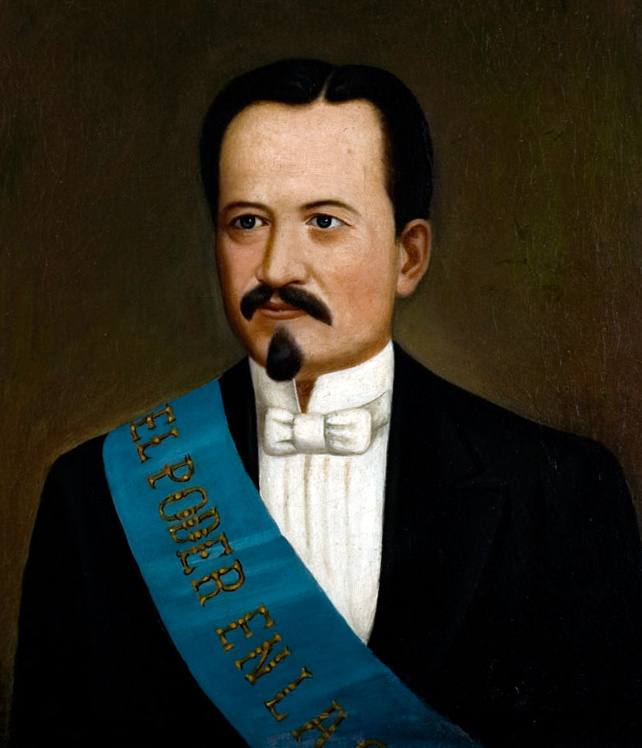

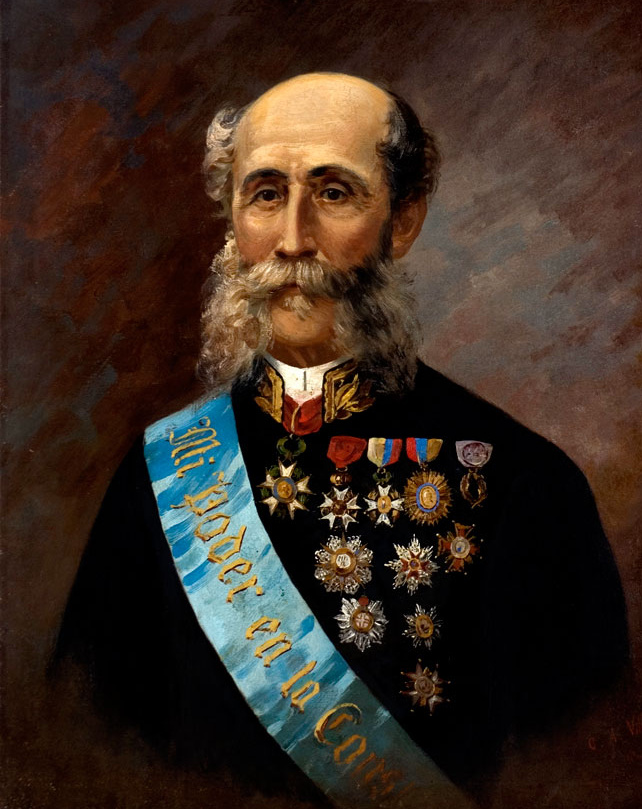
Nominee	Antonio Borrero	Julio Sáenz	Antonio Flores Jijón
Party	Anti-García	PC	PC
Popular vote	38,637	3,583	2,836
Percentage	85.75%	7.95%	6.29%
President before election
Manuel de Ascásubi
Elected President
Antonio Borrero

Presidential elections were held in Ecuador on 10 October 1875, following the assassination of Gabriel García Moreno, who had been elected president in May. The result was a victory for Antonio Borrero, who received 86% of the vote. He took office on 9 December.

The elections were the first free and fair presidential elections in Ecuador history.

== Results ==
Candidate	Party	Votes	%
Antonio Borrero	Anti-García Liberals and Conservatives	38,637	85.75
Julio Sáenz	Conservative Party	3,583	7.95
Antonio Flores Jijón	Conservative Party	2,836	6.29
Total		45,056	100.00
Source: TSE
