= Antonio Borrero =

President of Ecuador (1875–1876)

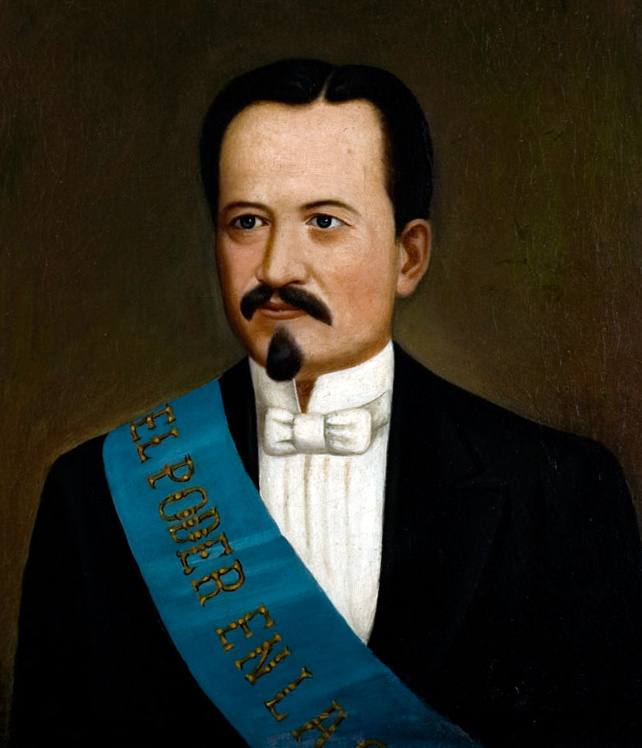

10th President of Ecuador
- In office 9 December 1875 – 18 December 1876
- Preceded by: José Javier Eguiguren
- Succeeded by: Ignacio de Veintemilla

Personal details
- Born: 29 October 1827 Cuenca, Gran Colombia
- Died: 9 October 1911 (aged 83) Quito, Ecuador

Antonio María Vicente Narciso Borrero y Cortázar (29 October 1827 – 9 October 1911) was Vice President of Ecuador from 1863 to 1864, and President from 9 December 1875 to 18 December 1876.

Antonio Borrero was born in Cuenca, Ecuador and completed much of his education in his home town. He received his law license in Quito.

He was elected President in the October 1875 Ecuadorian presidential election, the first free and fair presidential elections in Ecuador history. He served as President of Ecuador for little over a year before being overthrown by General Ignacio Veintemilla in the Revolution of Veintemilla. He was exiled by Jefe Supremo (Supreme Chief) Ignacio de Veintemilla and lived for a number of years in Peru and Chile. After the overthrow of Veintemilla in 1883, he was allowed to return to Ecuador where he practiced law and worked as a journalist and writer until his death in Quito in 1911.

His administration supported free suffrage, press freedom and guarantees of individual rights. He was urged to by liberals to hold a national assembly to amend the Garciana Constitution and establish the Republic on more modern lines.

Political offices
| Preceded by Mariano Cueva | Vice President of Ecuador; 1863–1864 | Succeeded by Rafael Carvajal |
| Preceded by José Javier Eguiguren | President of Ecuador; 1875–1876 | Succeeded by Ignacio de Veintemilla |
