= Solomon B. Stebbins =

American politician

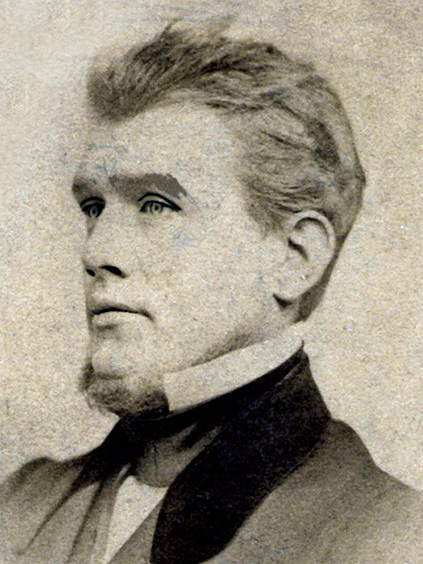

Chairman of the Boston Board of Aldermen
- In office 1882
- Preceded by: Hugh O'Brien
- Succeeded by: Hugh O'Brien
- In office 1878
- Preceded by: John Taylor Clark
- Succeeded by: Hugh O'Brien

Member of the Boston Board of Aldermen
- In office 1873–1879

Member of the Massachusetts Senate
- In office 1866

Member of the Boston Common Council
- In office 1864–1865

Member of the Massachusetts House of Representatives
- In office 1861

Personal details
- Born: January 18, 1830 Warren, Massachusetts
- Died: June 8, 1910 (aged 80) Boston
- Party: Republican

Solomon Bliss Stebbins (January 18, 1830 – June 8, 1910) was an American politician from Boston.

== Early life ==
Stebbins was born on January 18, 1830, in Warren, Massachusetts. At the age of 18 he was put in charge of the post office in Ludlow, Massachusetts. He moved to Boston in 1850 and in 1858 he and Mitchell F. Andrews established the city's first combined grain elevator and warehouse.

== Politics ==
Stebbins was a member of the Massachusetts House of Representatives in 1861. In 1864 and 1865 he was a member of the Boston Common Council. He was a delegate to the 1864 Republican National Convention. In 1866 he was a member of the Massachusetts Senate. From 1873 to 1879 he was a member of the Boston Board of Aldermen. He was chairman of the board in 1879. Stebbins was the Republican nominee in the 1879 and 1880 Boston mayoral elections. He lost the latter election by 581 votes. He returned to the board of aldermen in 1882 and once again served as chairman. He was one of the commissioners responsible for overseeing the construction of the Suffolk County Courthouse and served as custodian of that building from 1890 until his death on June 8, 1910.
