= 1879 Faroese general election =

Danish territorial election

Partial general elections were held in the Faroe Islands in 1879 to elect nine of the eighteen elected members of the Løgting. The Danish administrator (Amtmaður) and the local dean (Próstur) were also members, with the administrator serving as the speaker.

== Electoral system ==
Members of the Løgting were elected by first-past-the-post voting, with voters having as many votes as there were seats available in their constituency. Nine of the 18 seats were elected every two years. Voting was restricted to men aged 25 or over who met certain tax-paying criteria.

== Results ==
Constituency	Elected members	Notes
Eysturoy	Peter Jacobsen	
Eysturoy	Gregers Joensen	Re-elected
Eysturoy	Gregorius Johannesen	
Eysturoy	Johannes Petersen	Re-elected
Norðurstreymoy	Hans Emil Emanuel Madsen-Hoff	
Norðurstreymoy	Jacob Petersen	
Suðurstreymoy	Lütje Lützen	Re-elected
Vágar	Mikkjal Danielsen	Re-elected
Vágar	Zacharias Nielsen	Re-elected
Source: Løgting

=== By constituency ===
Norðurstreymoy
Candidate	Votes	%
Hans Emil Emanuel Madsen-Hoff	14	28.00
Jacob Petersen	14	28.00
Ole Jacobsen	13	26.00
Samuel Peter Samuelsen	4	8.00
Johan Olsen	3	6.00
Andreas Sigvald Reinert	2	4.00
Total	50	100.00
Total votes	25	–
Source: Løgting

== Aftermath ==
In 1880 Lütje Lützen left the country and was replaced by Lorentz Højer Buchwaldt, while Peter Jacobsen was replaced by Samuel Jacob Rasmussen in the same year. Hans Emil Emanuel Madsen-Hoff was replaced by Ole Jacobsen in 1881. Buchwaldt was replaced by Jacob Jacobsen in 1882.
