= José Javier Eguiguren =

Acting president of Ecuador (1875)

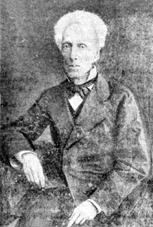

Interim President of Ecuador
- In office 6 October 1875 – 9 December 1875
- Preceded by: Francisco León Franco
- Succeeded by: Antonio Borrero

Personal details
- Born: 16 December 1816
- Died: 1884 (aged 67–68)
- Party: Conservative Party

José Javier Eguiguren Ríofrío (3 December 1816 – 1884) was acting President of Ecuador from 6 October 1875 to 9 December 1875.

He was Minister of Finance from 1870 to 1871 and from 1874 to 1875.

Political offices
Preceded by Francisco León Franco	President of Ecuador; 1875	Succeeded by Antonio Borrero
