= Henry L. Eaton =

American politician

Henry L. Eaton (October 17, 1834 – January 4, 1890) was an American farmer, Republican politician, and Wisconsin pioneer. He served two years in the Wisconsin Senate (1872, 1873) and also served two years in the Wisconsin State Assembly (1864, 1865), representing Richland County. He was the Republican nominee for lieutenant governor of Wisconsin in 1875.

== Biography ==
Henry Eaton was born in Columbia, New York, and received a common school education. He came to Wisconsin in 1857 and settled near Lone Rock, Wisconsin, in Richland County.

Eaton was elected to the Assembly in 1864 and 1865. He later represented the 28th District in the Senate from 1872 to 1873. He was the Republican nominee for lieutenant governor of Wisconsin in the 1875 election, but lost the general election to incumbent Democrat Charles D. Parker.

Party political offices
| Preceded by Robert Hall Baker | Republican nominee for Lieutenant Governor of Wisconsin; 1875 | Succeeded by James M. Bingham |
