= 1875 Rhode Island gubernatorial election =

- April 7, 1875
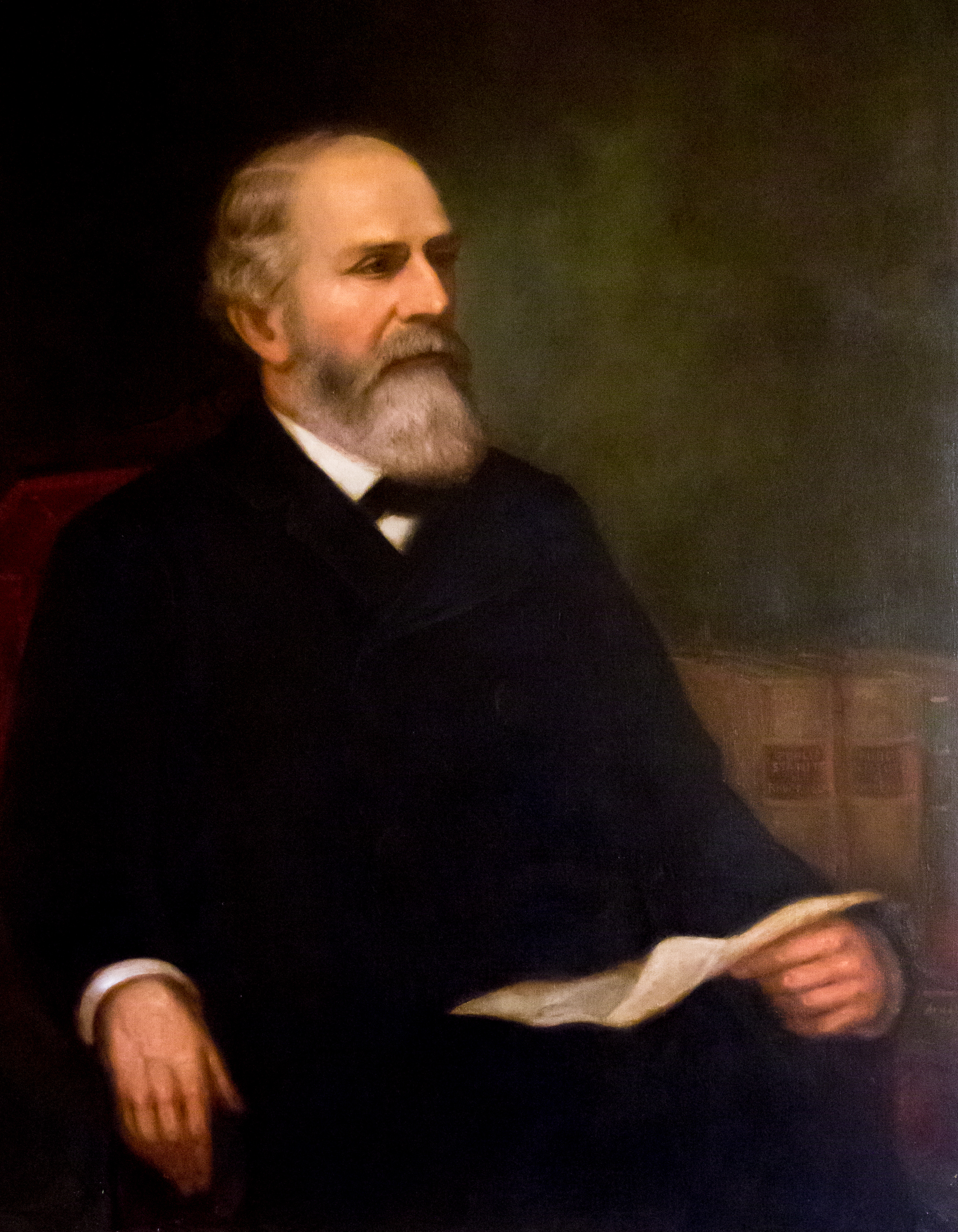

Nominee	Henry Lippitt	Rowland Hazard	Charles R. Cutler
Party	Republican	Independent Republican	Democratic
Alliance		Prohibition
Electoral vote	70	36	eliminated
Popular vote	8,368	8,724	5,166
Percentage	37.60%	39.19%	23.21%
- County results Lippitt: 30–40% Hazard: 40–50% Cutler: 30–40% 40–50%
Governor before election
Henry Howard
Republican
Elected Governor
Henry Lippitt
Republican

The 1875 Rhode Island gubernatorial election took place on April 7, 1875, to elect the governor of Rhode Island. No candidate won a majority of the votes cast, sending the election to the Rhode Island General Assembly, where Henry Lippitt defeated fellow Republican Rowland Hazard II and Democrat Charles R. Cutler.

== General election ==
The temperance movement divided Rhode Island Republicans ahead of the 1875 state elections. Lippitt was nominated by the "regular" Republican organization, but faced opposition from supporters of the state's temperance law. Pro-temperance independent Republicans and members of the Prohibition Party supported Hazard. On election day, Hazard received more votes than either of his rivals, but less than a majority. As stipulated by the Rhode Island Constitution, the election went to the General Assembly, which met on May 25 and elected Lippitt with 70 votes to 36 for Hazard.

=== Results ===
Rhode Island gubernatorial election, 1875
Party	Candidate	Votes	%
Republican	Henry Lippitt	8,368	37.60
Independent Republican	Rowland Hazard II	8,724	39.19
Democratic	Charles R. Cutler	5,166	23.21
Total votes		22,258	100.00
Republican hold			
