= James M. Bingham =

19th century American politician

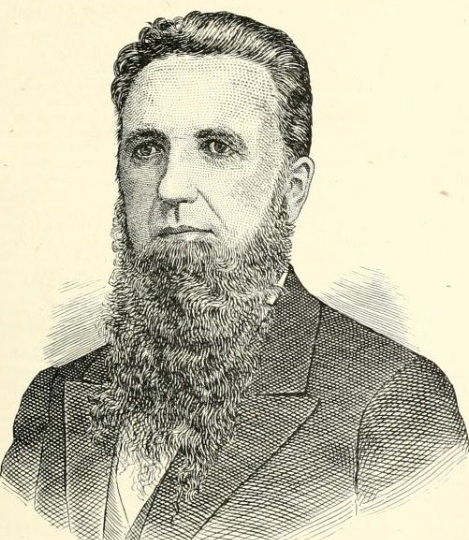

13th Lieutenant Governor of Wisconsin
- In office January 7, 1878 – January 2, 1882
- Governor: William E. Smith
- Preceded by: Charles D. Parker
- Succeeded by: Sam Fifield

20th Speaker of the Wisconsin State Assembly
- In office January 1870 – January 1871
- Preceded by: Alexander McDonald Thomson
- Succeeded by: William E. Smith

13th Mayor of Chippewa Falls, Wisconsin
- In office April 1883 – April 1884
- Preceded by: Ambrose Hoffman
- Succeeded by: Jacob Leinenkugel

Member of the Wisconsin State Assembly
- In office January 5, 1874 – January 4, 1875
- Preceded by: Albert Pound
- Succeeded by: Thomas L. Halbert
- Constituency: Chippewa district
- In office January 4, 1869 – January 2, 1871
- Preceded by: Samuel W. Hunt
- Succeeded by: James A. Bate
- Constituency: Chippewa–Dunn district
- In office January 5, 1863 – January 2, 1865
- Preceded by: John B. Crosby
- Succeeded by: William P. Forsyth
- Constituency: Jefferson 4th district

Personal details
- Born: February 3, 1828 Perry, New York, U.S.
- Died: January 8, 1885 (aged 56) Chippewa Falls, Wisconsin, U.S.
- Resting place: Forest Hill Cemetery, Chippewa Falls, Wisconsin
- Party: Republican
- Spouse: Justina Madelaine Wright (m. 1856–1885)
- Children: Clifford Dwight Bingham^{(b. 1857; died 1939)}; Walter Vance Bingham^{(b. 1860; died 1946)}

Military service
- Allegiance: United States
- Branch/service: United States Volunteers; Union Army
- Years of service: 1864
- Rank: Major, USV
- Unit: 40th Reg. Wis. Vol. Infantry
- Battles/wars: American Civil War

James M. Bingham (February 3, 1828 – January 8, 1885) was an American lawyer and Republican politician. He served as the 13th lieutenant governor of Wisconsin, the 20th speaker of the Wisconsin State Assembly, and the 13th mayor of Chippewa Falls, Wisconsin.

== Biography ==
He was born in Perry, New York, in 1828, and moved to Palmyra, Wisconsin, in 1854, where he practiced law. Bingham served in the 40th Wisconsin Infantry Regiment as a major. A Republican, he served terms in the Wisconsin State Assembly in 1863, 1864, 1869, 1870, and 1874 and was elected its speaker in 1870. He moved to Chippewa Falls, Wisconsin in 1870. In 1878, he was elected the 13th Lieutenant Governor of Wisconsin under Governor William E. Smith, an office he held for two terms until 1882. He died in 1885 in Chippewa Falls, Wisconsin.

== Legacy ==
His former home, now known as the Cook-Rutledge House, is listed on the National Register of Historic Places.

== Notes ==
Party political offices
| Preceded by Henry L. Eaton | Republican nominee for Lieutenant Governor of Wisconsin; 1877, 1879 | Succeeded by Sam Fifield |
Wisconsin State Assembly
| Preceded by John B. Crosby | Member of the Wisconsin State Assembly from the Jefferson 4th district January 5, 1863 – January 2, 1865 | Succeeded by William P. Forsyth |
| Preceded by Samuel W. Hunt | Member of the Wisconsin State Assembly from the Chippewa–Dunn district January 4, 1869 – January 2, 1871 | Succeeded by James A. Bate |
| Preceded by Albert Pound | Member of the Wisconsin State Assembly from the Chippewa district January 5, 1874 – January 4, 1875 | Succeeded by Thomas L. Halbert |
| Preceded by Alexander McDonald Thomson | Speaker of the Wisconsin State Assembly; January 12, 1870 – January 11, 1871 | Succeeded by William E. Smith |
Political offices
| Preceded by Charles D. Parker | Lieutenant Governor of Wisconsin; January 7, 1878 – January 2, 1882 | Succeeded by Sam Fifield |
| Preceded by Ambrose Hoffman | Mayor of Chippewa Falls, Wisconsin; April 1883 – April 1884 | Succeeded by Jacob Leinenkugel |
