= John Higley Case =

American politician (1832–1890)

Member of the Minnesota Senate from the 8th district
- In office January 3, 1871 – January 1, 1872
- Preceded by: George Washington Batchelder
- Succeeded by: William H. Stevens

Personal details
- Born: April 15, 1832 Torrington, Connecticut, U.S.
- Died: March 3, 1890 (aged 57) Faribault, Minnesota, U.S.
- Party: Republican
- Spouse: Anna Buike (m. 1875)
- Education: Yale College; Yale Law School
- Occupation: Politician; lawyer

John Higley Case (April 15, 1832 – March 3, 1890) was an American politician and lawyer from Minnesota.

== Early life ==
John Higley Case was born on April 15, 1832, in Torrington, Connecticut, to Jarrus Case. He later moved to Granby. He graduated from Yale College in 1855. From September 1855 to September 1856, he was engaged in agriculture and studying law. In September 1856, he entered Yale Law School and studied there until July 1857.

== Career ==
In 1858, Case started a law practice in Faribault, Minnesota, with Gordon E. Cole. Their partnership later dissolved and he continued practicing law in Faribault throughout his life. He was district attorney from 1864 to 1867. Case was a Republican. In 1870, he served as a member of the Minnesota Senate, representing district 18, which represented Rice County. Following his year of service, his district was redistricted.

== Personal life ==
Case married Anna Buike of Faribault on December 1, 1875. He died on March 3, 1890, at his home in Faribault.
