= 1881 Ohio gubernatorial election =

- October 11, 1881
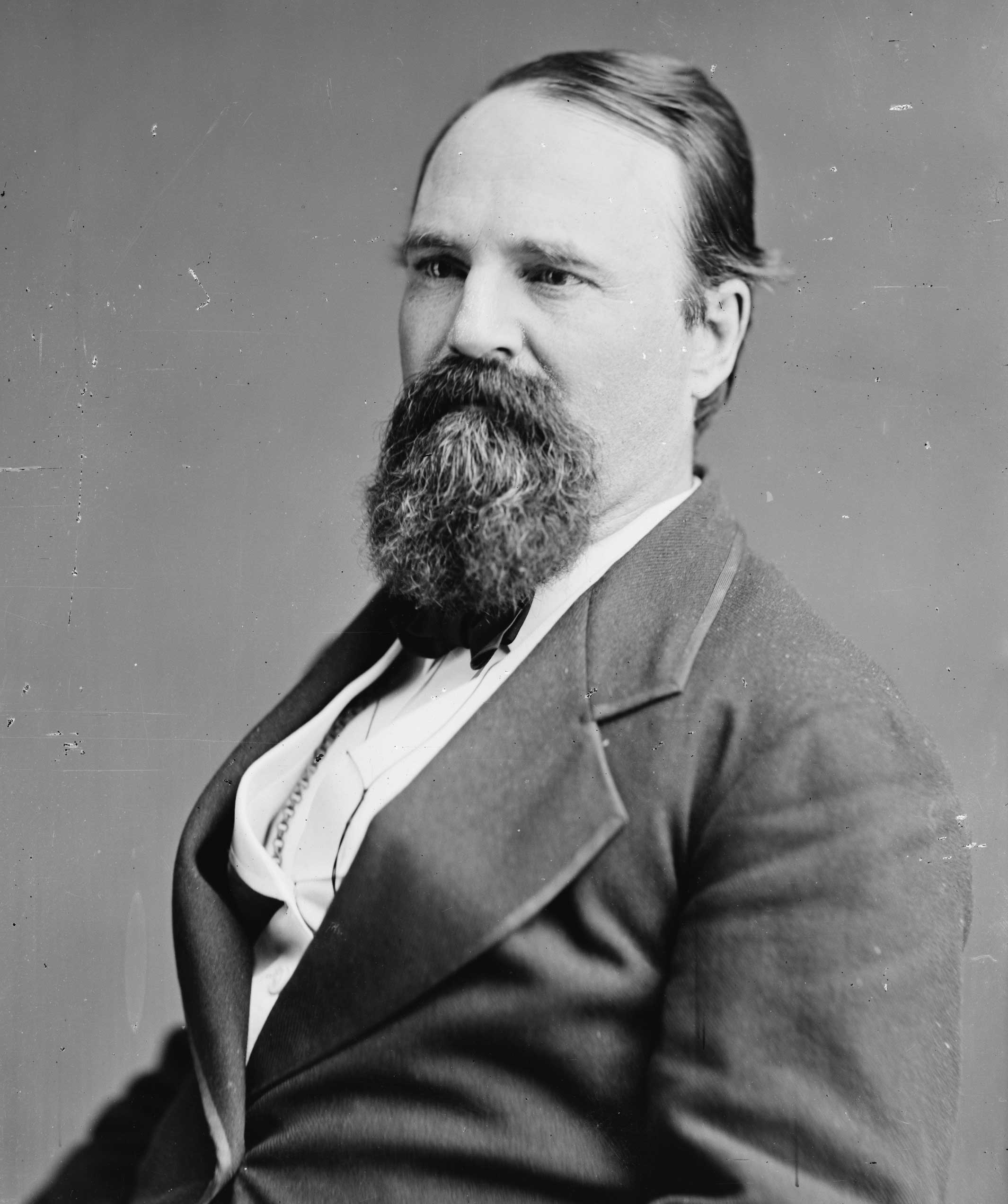

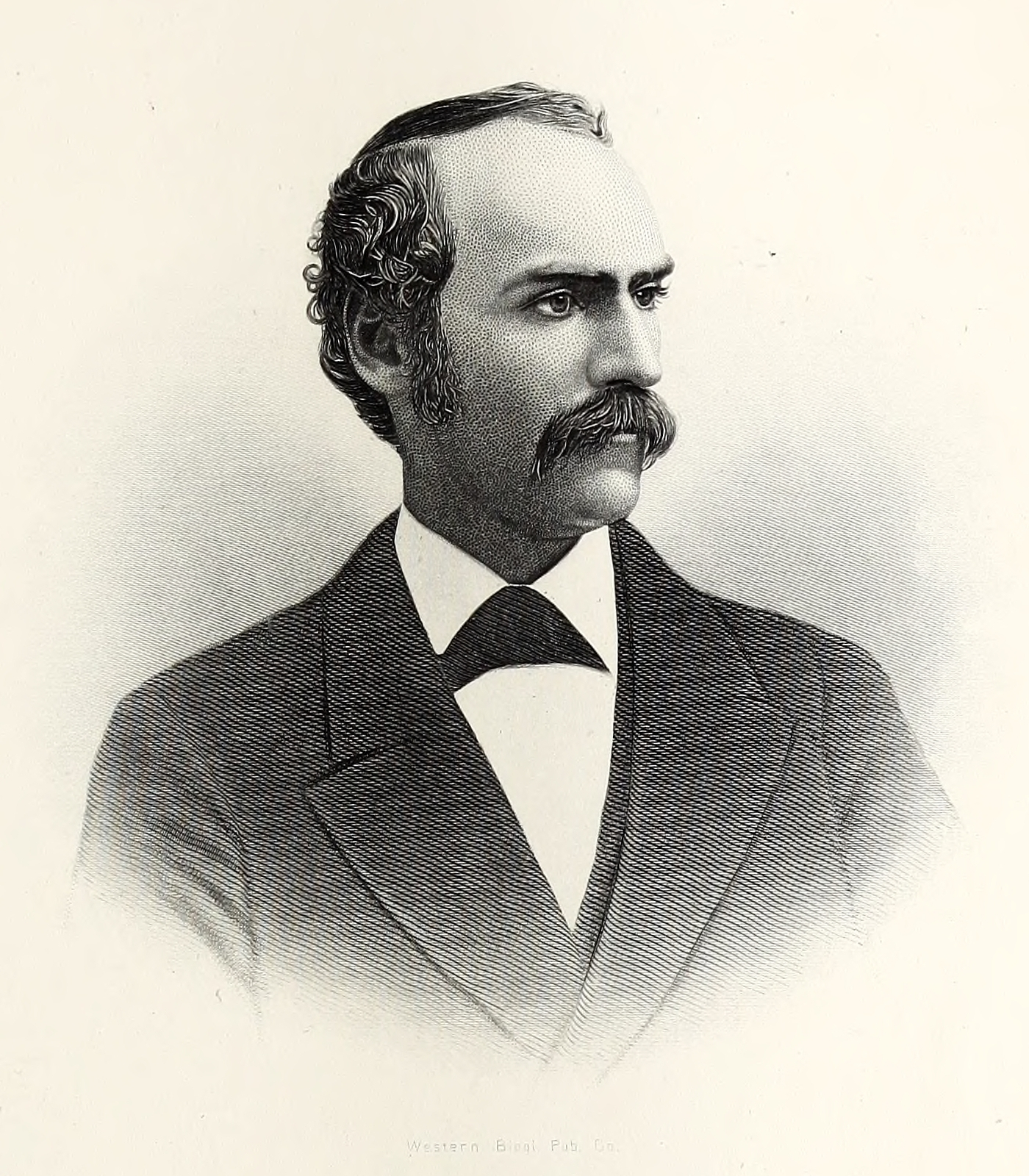
Nominee	Charles Foster	John W. Bookwalter
Party	Republican	Democratic
Popular vote	312,735	288,426
Percentage	50.10%	46.21%
- County results Foster: 40–50% 50–60% 60–70% 70–80% Bookwalter: 40–50% 50–60% 60–70%
Governor before election
Charles Foster
Republican
Elected Governor
Charles Foster
Republican

The 1881 Ohio gubernatorial election was held on October 11, 1881. Incumbent Republican Charles Foster defeated Democratic nominee John W. Bookwalter with 50.10% of the vote.

== General election ==
=== Candidates ===
Major party candidates

- Charles Foster, Republican
- John W. Bookwalter, Democratic

Other candidates

- Abraham R. Ludlow, Prohibition
- John J. Seitz, People's

=== Results ===
1881 Ohio gubernatorial election
Party	Candidate	Votes	%	±%
Republican	Charles Foster (incumbent)	312,735	50.10%	
Democratic	John W. Bookwalter	288,426	46.21%	
Prohibition	Abraham R. Ludlow	16,597	2.66%	
Populist	John J. Seitz	6,330	1.01%	
Majority		24,309		
Turnout				
Republican hold		Swing		
