= Charles D. Parker =

19th century American politician

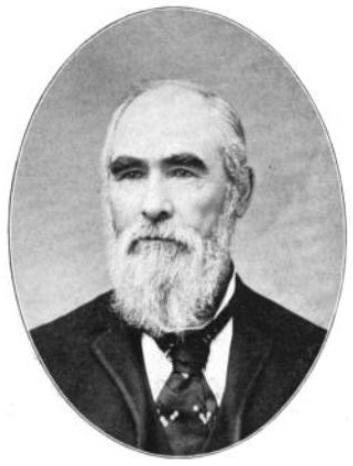
- From 1901's Freemasonry In Wisconsin

12th Lieutenant Governor of Wisconsin
- In office January 5, 1874 – January 7, 1878
- Governor: William Robert Taylor; Harrison Ludington
- Preceded by: Milton Pettit
- Succeeded by: James M. Bingham

Member of the Wisconsin State Assembly from the St. Croix district
- In office January 4, 1869 – January 2, 1871
- Preceded by: Marcus Fulton
- Succeeded by: Revel K. Fay

Personal details
- Born: December 27, 1827 Coos County, New Hampshire, U.S.
- Died: December 27, 1925 (aged 98) River Falls, Wisconsin, U.S.
- Resting place: Greenwood Cemetery, River Falls, Wisconsin
- Party: Democratic; Republican (before 1873)
- Spouse: Angeline Flora Southworth (m. 1853–1925)
- Children: Evangeline A. (White)^{(b. 1854; died 1888)}; Charles S. Parker^{(b. 1855; died 1880)}; Marco Luther Parker^{(b. 1858; died 1935)}; Lincoln H. Parker^{(b. 1860; died 1954)}; Elmer Hiram Parker^{(b. 1863; died 1948)}; Ava Willis Parker^{(b. 1865; died 1866)}; Esmer Geralda Parker^{(b. 1868; died 1875)}; Rupert Merrill Parker^{(b. 1870; died 1958)}

Charles Durwin Parker (December 27, 1827 – December 27, 1925) was an American farmer, politician, and Wisconsin pioneer. He served as the 12th lieutenant governor of Wisconsin, and represented St. Croix in the Wisconsin State Assembly in 1869 and 1870.

== Career ==
Parker was born in Coos County, New Hampshire, in 1827; his family moved to Waukesha County, Wisconsin Territory, in 1836. Parker then moved to the town of Pleasant Valley, St. Croix County, Wisconsin. Parker served as chairman of the Pleasant Valley Town Board and on the St. Croix County Board of Supervisors. He served as a Democrat in the Wisconsin State Assembly from 1869 to 1870 and served two terms as the 12th Lieutenant Governor of Wisconsin, from 1874 until 1878 under Governors William Taylor and Harrison Ludington. From 1880 until 1888 he was a regent of the University of Wisconsin, and from 1880 until 1895 a member of the Wisconsin Board of Control. He died on his 98th birthday, December 27, 1925, in River Falls, Wisconsin.

== Family ==
Parker was the son of Luther Parker, the justice of the peace of the Republic of Indian Stream.

Political offices
Preceded by Milton Pettit	Lieutenant Governor of Wisconsin; 1874–1878	Succeeded by James M. Bingham
